= 2017 San Jose State Spartans football team =

American college football season

2017 San Jose State Spartans football
- Conference: Mountain West Conference
- West Division
- Record: 2–11 (1–7 MW)
- Head coach: Brent Brennan (1st season)
- Offensive coordinator: Andrew Sowder (1st season)
- Offensive scheme: Spread
- Defensive coordinator: Derrick Odum (1st season)
- Base defense: 3–4
- Home stadium: CEFCU Stadium

2017 Mountain West Conference football standings
	Conf.			Overall
Team	W		L	W		L
Mountain Division
No. 22 Boise State xy$	7	–	1	11	–	3
Colorado State	5	–	3	7	–	6
Wyoming	5	–	3	8	–	5
Utah State	4	–	4	6	–	7
Air Force	4	–	4	5	–	7
New Mexico	1	–	7	3	–	9
West Division
Fresno State xy	7	–	1	10	–	4
San Diego State	6	–	2	10	–	3
UNLV	4	–	4	5	–	7
Nevada	3	–	5	3	–	9
Hawaii	1	–	7	3	–	9
San Jose State	1	–	7	2	–	11
Championship: Boise State 17, Fresno State 14
$ – Conference champion; x – Division champion/co-champions; y – Championship game participant; Rankings from AP Poll

The 2017 San Jose State Spartans football team represented San Jose State University in the 2017 NCAA Division I FBS football season. The Spartans were led by first-year head coach Brent Brennan and played their home games at CEFCU Stadium. SJSU was a member of the Mountain West Conference in the West Division. They finished the season 2–11, 1–7 in Mountain West play to finish in a tie for fifth place in the West Division.

== Coaching staff ==
Name	Position	SJSU Years^{†}	Alma mater
Brent Brennan	Head coach	1st	UCLA (1996)
Ben Thienes	Director of football operations	1st	Boise State (2008)
Derrick Odum	Defensive coordinator	1st	Utah (1993)
Andrew Sowder	Offensive coordinator & tight ends coach	1st	Baylor (2011)
Joe Bernardi	Offensive line coach	1st	Fresno State (2010)
Alonzo Carter	Running backs coach	1st	CSU East Bay (2016)
Kevin Cummings	Wide receivers coach	1st	Oregon State (2014)
Bojay Filimoeatu	Linebackers coach	1st	Utah State (2012)
Ryan Gunderson	Quarterbacks coach	1st	Oregon State (2007)
Will Harris	Defensive backs coach	2nd	USC (2010)
Joe Seumalo	Defensive line coach	1st	Hawai'i (1995)
Fred Guidici	Quality control coach	1st	San José State (1989)
Matt Adkins	Graduate assistant – offense	1st	Southern Oregon (2012)
Josh Irvin	Graduate assistant – defense	1st	Chapman (2014)
Jamar Johnson	Graduate assistant – offense	1st	La Verne (2014)
Korey Geist	Coordinator of player personnel	2nd	San Francisco State (2015)
Cameron Radford	Director of football digital communications	1st	Oregon State (2010)
Gary Uribe	Head athletic performance coach	5th	La Verne (1996)
Melanie Hein	Learning specialist	3rd	San José State (1996)
Levi Moore	Football equipment manager	1st	San José State (in progress)
† – Number of consistent years at SJSU and position

== Personnel ==
=== Position key ===
Back	B	Center	C	Cornerback	CB	Defensive back	DB
Defensive end	DE	Defensive lineman	DL	Defensive tackle	DT	End	E
Fullback	FB	Guard	G	Halfback	HB	Kicker	K
Kickoff returner	KR	Offensive tackle	OT	Offensive lineman	OL	Linebacker	LB
Long snapper	LS	Punter	P	Punt returner	PR	Quarterback	QB
Running back	RB	Safety	S	Tight end	TE	Wide receiver	WR

=== Recruiting class ===
The Spartans signed a total of 23 recruits.

College recruiting information (2017)
Name	Hometown	School	Height	Weight	Commit date
Jerrell Alberty; RB	Oakland, California	McClymonds HS	5 ft 11 in (1.80 m)	200 lb (91 kg)	Jan 15, 2017
Jerrell Alberty; RB	Recruit ratings: Scout: Rivals: 247Sports:				
Sinjun Astani; DE	Malibu, California	Loyola HS	6 ft 4 in (1.93 m)	255 lb (116 kg)	Jan 30, 2017
Sinjun Astani; DE	Recruit ratings: Scout: Rivals: 247Sports:				
Antwaun Ayres; WR	West Covina, California	Northview HS	6 ft 0 in (1.83 m)	180 lb (82 kg)	Jan 22, 2017
Antwaun Ayres; WR	Recruit ratings: Scout: Rivals: 247Sports:				
Johnny Balderas; DB	Shafter, California	Liberty HS	6 ft 1 in (1.85 m)	175 lb (79 kg)	Jan 23, 2017
Johnny Balderas; DB	Recruit ratings: Scout: Rivals: 247Sports:				
Terrell Carter; QB	San Diego, California	Madison HS	6 ft 2 in (1.88 m)	185 lb (84 kg)	Jan 18, 2017
Terrell Carter; QB	Recruit ratings: Scout: Rivals: 247Sports:				
Jesse Chamberlain; OL	Burbank, California	Burroughs HS	6 ft 3 in (1.91 m)	280 lb (130 kg)	Jan 23, 2017
Jesse Chamberlain; OL	Recruit ratings: Scout: Rivals: 247Sports:				
Jake Colman; OL	Ventura, California	Ventura CC	6 ft 3 in (1.91 m)	310 lb (140 kg)	Jan 15, 2017
Jake Colman; OL	Recruit ratings: Scout: Rivals: 247Sports:				
Brandon Ezell; DB	Los Alamitos, California	Cerritos CC	6 ft 0 in (1.83 m)	190 lb (86 kg)	Jan 18, 2017
Brandon Ezell; DB	Recruit ratings: Scout: Rivals: 247Sports:				
Jamaar Hardy; DL	Antioch, California	Deer Valley HS	6 ft 3 in (1.91 m)	260 lb (120 kg)	Jan 24, 2017
Jamaar Hardy; DL	Recruit ratings: Scout: Rivals: 247Sports:				
Christian Johnson; DE	Olivehurst, California	Wheatland HS	6 ft 6 in (1.98 m)	260 lb (120 kg)	Jun 26, 2016
Christian Johnson; DE	Recruit ratings: Scout: Rivals: 247Sports:				
Ryan Johnson; QB	Hanford, California	Hanford HS	6 ft 4 in (1.93 m)	190 lb (86 kg)	Jul 25, 2016
Ryan Johnson; QB	Recruit ratings: Scout: Rivals: 247Sports:				
Austin Liles; WR	Anaheim, California	Orange Lutheran HS	6 ft 3 in (1.91 m)	190 lb (86 kg)	Aug 14, 2016
Austin Liles; WR	Recruit ratings: Scout: Rivals: 247Sports:				
Tyler Nevens; RB	Hacienda Heights, California	Los Altos HS	5 ft 11 in (1.80 m)	185 lb (84 kg)	Jan 30, 2017
Tyler Nevens; RB	Recruit ratings: Scout: Rivals: 247Sports:				
Justin Parcells; LB	Cypress, California	Fullerton CC	5 ft 11 in (1.80 m)	215 lb (98 kg)	Jan 17, 2017
Justin Parcells; LB	Recruit ratings: Scout: Rivals: 247Sports:				
Tysyn Parker; LB	Gardena, California	Serra HS	6 ft 1 in (1.85 m)	215 lb (98 kg)	Jan 28, 2017
Tysyn Parker; LB	Recruit ratings: Scout: Rivals: 247Sports:				
Jackson Parks; TE	Agoura Hills, California	Chaminade HS	6 ft 3 in (1.91 m)	235 lb (107 kg)	Jan 15, 2017
Jackson Parks; TE	Recruit ratings: Scout: Rivals: 247Sports:				
Brando Phillips; LB	Valencia, California	Butte CC	6 ft 3 in (1.91 m)	240 lb (110 kg)	Jan 16, 2017
Brando Phillips; LB	Recruit ratings: Scout: Rivals: 247Sports:				
Jamal Scott; LB	Anaheim, California	Fullerton CC	6 ft 2 in (1.88 m)	230 lb (100 kg)	Jan 16, 2017
Jamal Scott; LB	Recruit ratings: Scout: Rivals: 247Sports:				
Tyler Stevens; OG	Chandler, Arizona	Hamilton HS	6 ft 4 in (1.93 m)	285 lb (129 kg)	Nov 25, 2016
Tyler Stevens; OG	Recruit ratings: Scout: Rivals: 247Sports:				
Rico Tolefree; LB	Richmond, California	De Anza HS	6 ft 1 in (1.85 m)	223 lb (101 kg)	Jan 28, 2017
Rico Tolefree; LB	Recruit ratings: Scout: Rivals: 247Sports:				
John Toussaint; DB	Miami, Florida	Merced CC	6 ft 0 in (1.83 m)	190 lb (86 kg)	Jul 19, 2016
John Toussaint; DB	Recruit ratings: Scout: Rivals: 247Sports:				
Tre Walker; WR	Inglewood, California	Narbonne HS	5 ft 11 in (1.80 m)	160 lb (73 kg)	Feb 1, 2017
Tre Walker; WR	Recruit ratings: Scout: Rivals: 247Sports:				
Tre White; DB	Benicia, California	De La Salle HS	6 ft 0 in (1.83 m)	175 lb (79 kg)	Jan 24, 2017
Tre White; DB	Recruit ratings: Scout: Rivals: 247Sports:				
Overall recruit ranking:
Note: In many cases, Scout, Rivals, 247Sports, On3, and ESPN may conflict in their listings of height and weight.; In these cases, the average was taken. ESPN grades are on a 100-point scale.; Sources: "2017 Team Ranking". Rivals.com.

=== Roster ===
2017 San Jose State Spartans Football
Quarterback: 2 Terrell Carter – freshman (6'2, 185); 7 Montel Aaron – freshman (6'5, 210); 12 Josh Love – sophomore (6'2, 205); 13 Sam Allen – sophomore (6'2, 210); 14 Michael Carrillo – junior (5'11, 195); 16 Ryan Johnson – freshman (6'4, 190); Running back: 20 Malike Roberson – junior (5'8, 189); 23 Tyler Nevens – freshman (6'0, 218); 24 Jerrell Alberty – freshman (6'0, 205); 32 Brandon Monroe – senior (6'1, 243); 33 Jamar Williams – freshman (6'2, 225); 34 Zamore Zigler – sophomore (6'0, 171); 35 DeJon Packer – junior (5'11, 220); 39 Francoise Sims, II – freshman (6'0, 240); 40 Sage Ritchie – junior (5'10, 195); 46 Sean Pinson – junior (5'10, 190); 48 Brendan Manigo – freshman (5'10, 185); Wide receiver: 1 Jeremy Kelly – junior (6'2, 185); 4 Antwaun Ayers – freshman (6'0, 180); 8 Rahshead Johnson – junior (5'10, 178); 9 Justin Holmes – junior (6'2, 211); 10 Tre Walker – freshman (5'11, 160); 11 JaQuan Blackwell – freshman (6'0, 198); 15 Tre Hartley – junior (6'0, 196); 18 Austin Liles – freshman (6'3, 190); 22 Thai Cottrell – junior (5'7, 175); 37 David Martinez – junior (6'0, 180); 41 Steven Houston – freshman (6'4, 176); 80 Ray Surry – sophomore (6'2, 195); 82 Brandon Mitchell – senior (6'5, 210); 84 Bailey Gaither – sophomore (6'1, 183); Tight end: 81 Billy Humphreys – freshman (6'5, 241); 88 Jackson Parks – freshman (6'3, 235); 89 Josh Oliver – junior (6'5, 253)	Offensive lineman: 54 Charles Nelson – junior – (6'4, 306); 55 Jack Snyder – freshman – (6'5, 292); 56 Kyle Hoppe – freshman – (6'1, 296); 57 Trevor Robbins – freshman – (6'4, 296); 60 Chris Galleta – freshman – (6'0, 290); 62 Jeremiah Kolone – senior – (6'3, 308); 64 Chris Bradberry – freshman – (6'6, 290); 65 Robert Crandall – freshman – (6'3, 300); 66 Dominic Fredrickson – sophomore – (6'4, 297); 68 Keoni Taylor – senior – (6'3, 303); 70 Tyler Stevens – freshman – (6'4, 285); 72 Jake Colman – junior – (6'3, 290); 74 Chris Gonzalez – senior – (6'3, 310); 75 Nate Velichko – senior – (6'7, 305); 78 Jesse Chamberlain – freshman – (6'3, 280); 79 Troy Kowalski – sophomore – (6'5, 295); Defensive lineman: 8 Owen Roberts – junior – (6'2, 290); 9 Bryson Bridges – junior – (6'2, 291); 46 Cameron Woodard – freshman – (6'4, 275); 48 Gurdeep Chopra – freshman – (6'4, 255); 55 Brett Foley – sophomore – (6'3, 234); 67 Nico Aimonetti – senior – (6'5, 278); 77 Jamaar Hardy – freshman – (6'3, 260); 78 Deano Motes – sophomore – (6'5, 290); 90 Je'Von Taylor – freshman – (6'1, 231); 91 Ricky Leung-Wai – freshman – (6'2, 255); 93 Sinjun Astani – freshman – (6'4, 255); 95 Cameron Alexander – freshman – (6'4, 280); 96 Sailosi Latu – junior – (6'3, 310); 97 Christian Johnson – freshman – (6'6, 260); 98 Terrell Townsend – sophomore – (6'4, 270); Long snappers: 50 Harrison Hoffman – junior – (6'4, 225)	Linebacker: 5 Frank Ginda – junior – (6'0, 245); 11 William Ossai – senior – (6'2, 235); 16 Rico Tolefree – freshman – (6'1, 223); 28 Tysyn Parker – freshman – (6'1, 215); 30 Jackson Burrill – freshman – (6'2, 230); 33 Jesse Osuna – sophomore – (6'0, 225); 36 Malik Hayes – sophomore – (6'4, 232); 41 Hadari Darden – junior – (6'3, 213); 42 Jamal Scott – junior – (6'2, 237); 44 Justin Parcells – sophomore – (5'11, 226); 45 Noah Failuaga – sophomore – (6'1, 232); 51 Devon Calloway – freshman – (6'0, 220); 53 Alii Matau – freshman – (6'1, 214); Defensive back: 2 John Toussaint – junior – (6'0, 190); 3 Jermaine Kelly – senior – (6'1, 195); 6 Johnny Balderas – freshman (6'1, 175); 7 David Williams – junior – (6'0, 207); 10 Maurice McKnight – senior – (6'0, 200); 12 Brandon Ezell – junior – (6'0, 190); 15 Chad Miller – junior – (6'0, 190); 19 Dakari Monroe – junior – (5'11, 190); 20 Tre White – freshman – (6'0, 175); 21 Andre Chachere – senior – (6'0, 200); 22 Ryan Jenkins – freshman – (5'10, 174); 23 Trevon Bierria – sophomore – (6'0, 193); 25 Chandler Hawkins – junior – (5'11, 203); 26 Tre Webb – freshman – (6'0, 189); 27 Jonathan Lenard, Jr. – freshman – (6'1, 192); 29 Cameron Smith – freshman – (6'0, 182); 31 Ethan Aguayo – sophomore – (6'2, 220); 34 Jalend Dinwiddie – freshman – (5'11, 175); 38 Mato Pacheco – freshman (6'0, 176); Placekicker: 35 Jake Lanski – junior – (5'10, 195); 38 Bryce Crawford – junior – (6'3, 223); Punter: 17 Michael Carrizosa – senior – (5'10, 225); 49 Brian Papazian – freshman – (6'1, 190)

== Schedule and results ==
Date	Time	Opponent	Site	TV	Result	Attendance
August 26	4:30 p.m.	No. 19 South Florida*	CEFCU Stadium; San Jose, CA	CBSSN	L 22–42	13,377
September 2	4:30 p.m.	No. 23 (FCS) Cal Poly*	CEFCU Stadium; San Jose, CA		W 34–13	10,667
September 9	12:30 p.m.	at Texas*	Darrell K Royal–Texas Memorial Stadium; Austin, TX	LHN	L 0–56	88,117
September 16	7:00 p.m.	at Utah*	Rice-Eccles Stadium; Salt Lake City, UT	ESPN2	L 16–54	45,881
September 23	4:30 p.m.	Utah State	CEFCU Stadium; San Jose, CA	Stadium	L 10–61	12,426
September 30	7:30 p.m.	at UNLV	Sam Boyd Stadium; Whitney, NV	ESPNU	L 13–41	15,009
October 7	4:30 p.m.	Fresno State^{†}	CEFCU Stadium; San Jose, CA (Valley Cup)	ESPN3	L 10–27	18,483
October 14	9:00 p.m.	at Hawaii	Aloha Stadium; Honolulu, HI (Dick Tomey Legacy Game)	SPECTSN	L 26–37	25,019
October 28	12:00 p.m.	at BYU*	LaVell Edwards Stadium; Provo, UT	BYUtv/ESPN3	L 20–41	46,451
November 4	7:30 p.m.	San Diego State	CEFCU Stadium; San Jose, CA	ESPNU	L 7–52	17,629
November 11	1:00 p.m.	at Nevada	Mackay Stadium; Reno, NV	ESPN3	L 14–59	14,604
November 18	12:30 p.m.	at Colorado State	Colorado State Stadium; Fort Collins, CO	CBSSN	L 14–42	25,743
November 25	2:00 p.m.	Wyoming	CEFCU Stadium; San Jose, CA	ESPN3	W 20–17	12,653
*Non-conference game; ^{†}Homecoming; Rankings from AP Poll released prior to game; All times are in Pacific time

Schedule Source: 2017 San Jose State Spartans football schedule

== Game summaries ==
=== South Florida ===
No. 19 South Florida Bulls at San Jose State Spartans

Quarter	1	2	3	4	Total
No. 19 Bulls	0	28	7	7	42
Spartans	16	0	0	6	22

at CEFCU Stadium, San Jose, California

- Date: August 26, 2017
- Game time: 4:30 p.m. PDT
- Game weather: 94 °F (34 °C), sunny
- Game attendance: 13,377
- Referee: David Alvarez
- TV announcers (CBSSN): Randy Cross, Ben Holden, and John Schriffen
- ESPN Box Score

Game information

First Quarter

- (11:22) SJSU FG: Bryce Crawford 25-yard field goal.
- (8:28) SJSU TD: Josh Love 12-yard pass to Bailey Gaither (Bryce Crawford PAT).
- (3:11) SJSU TD: Josh Love 6-yard pass to Bailey Gaither (PAT missed).

Second Quarter

- (13:41) USF TD: Quinton Flowers 25-yard pass to Darnell Salomon (Emilio Nadelman PAT).
- (9:25) USF TD: D'Ernest Johnson 2-yard rush (Emilio Nadelman PAT).
- (7:13) USF TD: Quinton Flowers 48-yard pass to Temi Alaka (Emilio Nadelman PAT).
- (2:10) USF TD: D'Ernest Johnson 50-yard rush (Emilio Nadelman PAT).

Third Quarter

- (7:35) USF TD: Darius Tice 1-yard rush (Emilio Nadelman PAT).

Fourth Quarter

- (9:57) USF TD: Quinton Flowers 1-yard rush (Emilio Nadelman PAT).
- (8:09) SJSU TD: Montel Aaron 29-yard pass to Justin Holmes (PAT missed).

Passing

- USF – Quinton Flowers: 11/22, 222 yds, 2 TD
- SJSU – Josh Love: 18/36, 192 yds, 2 TD, 3 INT

Rushing

- USF – D'Ernest Johnson: 22 att, 99 yds, 2 TD
- SJSU – Malike Roberson: 19 att, 52 yds

Receiving

- USF – Marquez Valdes-Scantling: 6 rec, 91 yds
- SJSU – Bailey Gaither: 6 rec, 100 yds, 2 TD

=== Cal Poly ===
No. 23 (FCS) Cal Poly Mustangs at San Jose State Spartans

Quarter	1	2	3	4	Total
No. 23 (FCS) Mustangs	3	3	0	7	13
Spartans	0	7	13	14	34

at CEFCU Stadium, San Jose, California

- Date: September 2, 2017
- Game time: 4:30 p.m. PDT
- Game weather: 108 °F (42 °C), partly cloudy
- Game attendance: 10,667
- Referee: Stephen Baron
- ESPN Box Score

Game information

First Quarter

- (6:58) CP FG: Casey Sublette 35-yard field goal.

Second Quarter

- (12:33) CP FG: Casey Sublette 35-yard field goal.
- (9:18) SJSU TD: Montel Aaron 18-yard pass to JaQuan Blackwell (Bryce Crawford PAT).

Third Quarter

- (10:55) SJSU TD: Montel Aaron 13-yard pass to Tre Hartley (Bryce Crawford PAT).
- (2:24) SJSU TD: Montel Aaron 49-yard pass to Bailey Gaither (Bryce Crawford PAT missed).

Fourth Quarter

- (13:37) CP TD: Khaleel Jenkins 1-yard rush (Casey Sublette PAT).
- (7:50) SJSU TD: Zamore Zigler 17-yard rush (Bryce Crawford PAT).
- (7:41) SJSU TD: Jamal Scott 22-yard fumble return (Bryce Crawford PAT).

Passing

- CP – Khaleel Jenkins: 4/10, 37 yds
- SJSU – Montel Aaron: 11/17, 183 yds, 3 TD

Rushing

- CP – Jared Mohamed: 22 att, 97 yds
- SJSU – Zamore Zigler: 12 att, 121 yards, 1 TD

Receiving

- CP – J. J. Koski: 3 rec, 31 yds
- SJSU – JaQuan Blackwell: 4 rec, 84 yds, 1 TD

=== at Texas ===
San Jose State Spartans at Texas Longhorns

Quarter	1	2	3	4	Total
Spartans	0	0	0	0	0
Longhorns	7	14	14	21	56

at Darrell K Royal–Texas Memorial Stadium, Austin, Texas

- Date: September 9, 2017
- Game time: 2:30 p.m. CDT
- Game weather: 84 °F (29 °C), sunny
- Game attendance: 88,117
- Referee: Brad Van Vark
- TV announcers (LHN): Ahmad Brooks, Kris Budden, and Lowell Galindo
- ESPN Box Score

Game information

First Quarter

- (2:56) TEX TD: Jerrod Heard 9-yard rush (Joshua Rowland PAT).

Second Quarter

- (12:28) TEX TD: Chris Warren III 41-yard rush (Joshua Rowland PAT).
- (0:16) TEX TD: Jerrod Heard 3-yard rush (Joshua Rowland PAT).

Third Quarter

- (6:48) TEX TD: Kyle Porter 3-yard rush (Joshua Rowland PAT).
- (0:48) TEX TD: Holton Hill 45-yard interception return (Joshua Rowland PAT).

Fourth Quarter

- (13:10) TEX TD: Chris Warren III 9-yard rush (Joshua Rowland PAT).
- (12:08) TEX TD: Sam Ehlinger 1-yard pass to Armanti Foreman (Joshua Rowland PAT).
- (2:46) TEX TD: Toneil Carter 4-yard rush (Joshua Rowland PAT).

Passing

- SJSU – Montel Aaron: 12/23, 104 yds, 1 INT
- TEX – Sam Ehlinger: 15/27, 222 yds, 1 TD

Rushing

- SJSU – DeJon Packer: 5 att, 22 yds
- TEX – Chris Warren III: 16 att, 166 yds, 2 TD

Receiving

- SJSU – Josh Oliver: 3 rec, 21 yds
- TEX – Armanti Foreman: 5 rec, 51 yds, 1 TD

=== at Utah ===
San Jose State Spartans at Utah Utes

Quarter	1	2	3	4	Total
Spartans	3	10	0	3	16
Utes	9	21	7	17	54

at Rice-Eccles Stadium, Salt Lake City

- Date: September 16, 2017
- Game time: 8:00 p.m. MDT
- Game weather: 57 °F (14 °C), partly cloudy
- Game attendance: 45,881
- Referee: Kevin Hassell
- TV announcers (ESPN2): Alex Corddry, Ray Bentley, and Mark Neely
- ESPN Box Score

Game information

First Quarter

- (11:35) UTAH FG: Matt Gay 21-yard field goal.
- (8:05) UTAH FG: Matt Gay 56-yard field goal.
- (5:07) SJSU FG: Bryce Crawford 24-yard field goal.
- (1:36) UTAH FG: Matt Gay 50-yard field goal.

Second Quarter

- (13:44) UTAH TD: Tyler Huntley 7-yard pass to Darren Carrington II (Matt Gay PAT).
- (6:34) UTAH TD: Tyler Huntley 26-yard pass to Darren Carrington II (Matt Gay PAT).
- (3:32) UTAH TD: Zack Moss 5-yard rush (Matt Gay PAT).
- (1:08) SJSU FG: Bryce Crawford 51-yard field goal.
- (0:46) SJSU TD: Josh Love 47-yard pass to Bailey Gaither (Bryce Crawford PAT).

Third Quarter

- (2:36) UTAH TD: Tyler Huntley 13-yard pass to Raelon Singleton (Matt Gay PAT).

Fourth Quarter

- (14:20) SJSU FG: Bryce Crawford 38-yard field goal.
- (11:21) UTAH TD: Tyler Huntley 15-yard pass to Darren Carrington II (Matt Gay PAT).
- (3:48) UTAH FG: Matt Gay 20-yard field goal.
- (0:58) UTAH TD: Devonta'e Henry-Cole 10-yard rush (Matt Gay PAT).

Passing

- SJSU – Josh Love: 13/25, 183 yds, 1 TD
- UTAH – Tyler Huntley: 30/43, 341 yds, 4 TD, 1 INT

Rushing

- SJSU – DeJon Packer: 6 att, 28 yds
- UTAH – Tyler Huntley: 14 att, 53 yds

Receiving

- SJSU – Bailey Gaither: 8 rec, 125 yds, 1 TD
- UTAH – Darren Carrington II: 9 rec, 153 yds, 3 TD

=== Utah State ===
Utah State Aggies at San Jose State Spartans

Quarter	1	2	3	4	Total
Aggies	14	24	17	6	61
Spartans	0	0	7	3	10

at CEFCU Stadium, San Jose, California

- Date: September 23, 2017
- Game time: 4:30 p.m. PDT
- Game weather: 79 °F (26 °C), sunny
- Game attendance: 12,426
- Referee: Kevin Boitmann
- TV announcers (Stadium): Dan Hellie and Daniel Jeremiah
- ESPN Box Score

Game information

First Quarter

- (9:26) USU TD: LaJuan Hunt 29-yard rush (Dominik Eberle PAT).
- (2:15) USU TD: Kent Myers 19-yard pass to Braelon Roberts (Dominik Eberle PAT).

Second Quarter

- (12:44) USU TD: Kent Myers 43-yard pass to Gerold Bright (Dominik Eberle PAT).
- (10:26) USU TD: Maika Magalei 38-yard fumble return (Dominik Eberle PAT).
- (8:04) USU TD: Jordan Love 23-yard pass to Ron'quavion Tarver (Dominik Eberle PAT).
- (6:00) USU FG: Dominik Eberle 23-yard field goal.

Third Quarter

- (11:35) USU TD: Kent Myers 1-yard rush (Dominik Eberle PAT).
- (9:07) USU FG: Dominik Eberle 52-yard field goal.
- (4:38) USU TD: Kent Myers 68-yard rush (Dominik Eberle PAT).
- (0:51) SJSU TD: Jermaine Kelly 68-yard interception return (Bryce Crawford PAT).

Fourth Quarter

- (14:15) SJSU FG: Bryce Crawford 53-yard field goal.
- (3:50) USU FG: Dominik Eberle 20-yard field goal.
- (1:24) USU FG: Dominik Eberle 27-yard field goal.

Passing

- USU – Kent Myers: 18/24, 181 yds, 2 TD, 1 INT
- SJSU – Josh Love: 8/20, 54 yds, 1 INT

Rushing

- USU – Eltoro Allen: 18 att, 89 yds
- SJSU – Zamore Zigler: 8 att, 46 yds

Receiving

- USU – Dax Raymond: 3 rec, 47 yds
- SJSU – Bailey Gaither: 3 rec, 24 yds

=== at UNLV ===
San Jose State Spartans at UNLV Rebels

Quarter	1	2	3	4	Total
Spartans	3	10	0	0	13
Rebels	14	21	6	0	41

at Sam Boyd Stadium, Whitney, Nevada

- Date: September 30, 2017
- Game time: 7:30 p.m.
- Game weather: 86 °F (30 °C), sunny
- Game attendance: 15,009
- Referee: Kevin Hassell
- TV announcers (ESPNU): Roy Philpott and Tom Ramsey
- ESPN Box Score

Game information

First Quarter

- (11:28) UNLV TD: Armani Rogers 7-yard rush (Evan Pantels PAT).
- (9:16) SJSU FG: Bryce Crawford 28-yard field goal.
- (3:50) UNLV TD: Armani Rogers 7-yard rush (Evan Pantels PAT).

Second Quarter

- (8:53) SJSU FG: Bryce Crawford 23-yard field goal.
- (7:50) UNLV TD: Lexington Thomas 56-yard rush (Evan Pantels PAT).
- (3:36) UNLV TD: Armani Rogers 44-yard pass to Brandon Presley (Daniel Guiterrez PAT).
- (2:20) UNLV TD: Lexington Thomas 1-yard rush (Daniel Guiterrez PAT).
- (0:09) SJSU TD: Josh Love 11-yard pass to JaQuan Blackwell (Bryce Crawford PAT).

Third Quarter

- (3:29) UNLV TD: Armani Rogers 1-yard pass to Trevor Kanterman (Daniel Guiterrez PAT missed).

Passing

- SJSU – Josh Love: 30/48, 315 yds, 1 TD, 2 INT
- UNLV – Armani Rogers: 11/16, 203 yds, 2 TD

Rushing

- SJSU – Tyler Nevens: 17 att, 94 yds
- UNLV – Lexington Thomas: 18 att, 146 yds, 2 TD

Receiving

- SJSU – Tre Walker: 8 rec, 104 yds
- UNLV – Devonte Boyd: 5 rec, 105 yds

=== Fresno State ===
81st Valley Cup: Fresno State Bulldogs at San Jose State Spartans

Quarter	1	2	3	4	Total
Bulldogs	14	7	0	6	27
Spartans	0	0	7	3	10

at CEFCU Stadium, San Jose, California

- Date: October 7, 2017
- Game time: 4:30 p.m. PDT
- Game weather: 82 °F (28 °C), sunny
- Game attendance: 18,483
- Referee: Scott Campbell
- TV announcers (ESPN3): Forrest Conoly and Drew Fellios
- ESPN Box Score

Game information

First Quarter

- (6:06) FRES TD: Ronnie Rivers 15-yard rush (Jimmy Camacho PAT).
- (2:24) FRES TD: Ronnie Rivers 3-yard rush (Jimmy Camacho PAT).

Second Quarter

- (0:35) FRES TD: Josh Hokit 1-yard rush (Jimmy Camacho PAT).

Third Quarter

- (6:24) SJSU TD: Josh Love 6-yard pass to Josh Oliver (Bryce Crawford PAT).

Fourth Quarter

- (13:40) FRES FG: Jimmy Camacho 38-yard field goal.
- (8:36) SJSU FG: Bryce Crawford 51-yard field goal.
- (6:14) FRES FG: Jimmy Camacho 50-yard field goal.

Passing

- FRES – Marcus McMaryion: 15/26, 136 yds
- SJSU – Josh Love: 15/25, 97 yds, 1 TD, 1 INT

Rushing

- FRES – Ronnie Rivers: 19 att, 105 yds, 2 TD
- SJSU – Tyler Nevens: 21 att, 99 yds

Receiving

- FRES – KeeSean Johnson: 2 rec, 52 yds
- SJSU – JaQuan Blackwell: 5 rec, 41 yds

=== at Hawaii ===
San Jose State Spartans at Hawaii Rainbow Warriors

Quarter	1	2	3	4	Total
Spartans	10	3	7	6	26
Rainbow Warriors	0	14	7	16	37

at Aloha Stadium, Honolulu

- Date: October 14, 2017
- Game time: 6:00 p.m. HST
- Game weather: 81 °F (27 °C), partly cloudy
- Game attendance: 25,019
- Referee: Stephen Baron
- TV announcers (SS): Robert Kekaula, Rich Miano, and Scott Robbs
- ESPN Box Score

Game information

First Quarter

- (9:14) SJSU FG: Bryce Crawford 28-yard field goal.
- (4:31) SJSU TD: Montel Aaron 15-yard pass to Rahshead Johnson (Bryce Crawford PAT).

Second Quarter

- (13:02) HAW TD: Diocemy Saint Juste 1-yard rush (Alex Trifonovitch PAT).
- (0:34) HAW TD: Cole McDonald 4-yard pass to Dakota Torres (Alex Trifonovitch PAT).
- (0:00) SJSU FG: Bryce Crawford 52-yard field goal.

Third Quarter

- (12:43) HAW TD: Dru Brown 22-yard pass to Dylan Collie (Alex Trifonovitch PAT).
- (1:47) SJSU TD: Montel Aaron 59-yard pass to Rahshead Johnson (Bryce Crawford PAT).

Fourth Quarter

- (9:00) HAW TD: Diocemy Saint Juste 1-yard rush (Alex Trifonovitch PAT).
- (8:44) SJSU TD: Rahshead Johnson 96-yard rush kickoff return (Bryce Crawford PAT missed).
- (8:44) HAW D2P: Rojesterman Farris II defensive PAT conversion.
- (6:09) HAW TD: Ryan Tuiasoa 3-yard rush (Alex Trifonovitch PAT).

Passing

- SJSU – Montel Aaron: 17/27, 322 yds, 2 TD, 1 INT
- HAW – Dru Brown: 12/23, 173 yds, 1 TD

Rushing

- SJSU – Tyler Nevens: 22 att, 84 yds
- HAW – Dicoemy Saint Juste: 39 att, 202 yds, 2 TD

Receiving

- SJSU – JaQuan Blackwell: 2 rec, 99 yds
- HAW – Keelan Ewaliko: 3 rec, 82 yds

=== at BYU ===
San Jose State Spartans at BYU Cougars

Quarter	1	2	3	4	Total
Spartans	3	3	0	14	20
Cougars	14	10	7	10	41

at LaVell Edwards Stadium, Provo, Utah

- Date: October 28, 2017
- Game time: 1:00 p.m. MDT
- Game weather: 57 °F (14 °C), sunny
- Game attendance: 46,451
- Referee: Scott Campbell
- TV announcers (BYUtv/ESPN3): Blaine Fowler and Dave McCann
- ESPN Box Score

Game information

First Quarter

- (10:43) BYU TD: Tanner Mangum 23-yard pass to Micah Simon (Rhett Almond PAT).
- (9:34) BYU TD: Tanner Mangum 11-yard pass to Matt Bushman (Rhett Almond PAT).
- (6:18) SJSU FG: Bryce Crawford 48-yard field goal.

Second Quarter

- (10:45) SJSU FG: Bryce Crawford 25-yard field goal.
- (10:27) BYU TD: KJ Hall 75-yard rush (Rhett Almond PAT).
- (5:09) BYU FG: Rhett Almond 36-yard field goal.

Third Quarter

- (5:30) BYU TD: Squally Canada 9-yard rush (Rhett Almond PAT).

Fourth Quarter

- (14:52) BYU TD: Tanner Mangum 41-yard pass to Micah Simon (Rhett Almond PAT).
- (12:12) BYU FG: Rhett Almond 30-yard field goal.
- (7:24) SJSU TD: Montel Aaron 30-yard pass to Tre Walker (Bryce Crawford PAT).
- (0:42) SJSU TD: Montel Aaron 9-yard pass to Tre Hartley (Bryce Crawford PAT).

Passing

- SJSU – Montel Aaron: 25/39, 198 yds, 2 TD, 1 INT
- BYU – Tanner Mangum: 18/34, 283 yds, 3 TD, 1 INT

Rushing

- SJSU – Tyler Nevens: 26 att, 112 yds
- BYU – KJ Hall: 10 att, 112 yds, 1 TD

Receiving

- SJSU – Tre Walker: 6 rec, 58 yds, 1 TD
- BYU – Micah Simon: 3 rec, 67 yds, 2 TD

=== San Diego State ===
San Diego State Aztecs at San Jose State Spartans

Quarter	1	2	3	4	Total
Aztecs	21	14	14	3	52
Spartans	0	0	7	0	7

at CEFCU Stadium, San Jose, California

- Date: November 4, 2017
- Game time: 7:30 p.m. PST
- Game weather: 55 °F (13 °C), cloudy
- Game attendance: 17,629
- Referee: Michael VanderVelde
- TV announcers (ESPNU): Kevin Brown and Rene Ingoglia
- ESPN Box Score

Game information

First Quarter

- (9:32) SDSU TD: Rashaad Penny 13-yard rush (John Baron II PAT).
- (8:29) SDSU TD: Rashaad Penny 82-yard rush (John Baron II PAT).
- (3:29) SDSU TD: Juwan Washington 1-yard rush (John Baron II PAT).

Second Quarter

- (12:26) SDSU TD: Christian Chapman 8-yard pass to Nick Bawden (John Baron II PAT).
- (5:03) SDSU TD: Juwan Washington 1-yard rush (John Baron II PAT).

Third Quarter

- (12:40) SJSU TD: Tre Walker 54-yard pass to Justin Holmes (Bryce Crawford PAT).
- (12:27) SDSU TD: Rashaad Penny 64-yard rush (John Baron II PAT).
- (0:55) SDSU TD: Chase Jasmin 9-yard rush (John Baron II PAT).

Fourth Quarter

- (10:18) SDSU FG: John Baron II 30-yard field goal.

Passing

- SDSU – Christian Chapman: 4/5, 77 yds, 1 TD
- SJSU – Montel Aaron: 11/21, 113 yds, 2 INT

Rushing

- SDSU – Rashaad Penny: 20 att, 234 yds, 3 TD
- SJSU – Tyler Nevens: 15 att, 46 yds

Receiving

- SDSU – Fred Trevillion: 1 rec, 40 yds
- SJSU – Justin Holmes: 3 rec, 80 yds, 1 TD

=== at Nevada ===
San Jose State Spartans at Nevada Wolf Pack

Quarter	1	2	3	4	Total
Spartans	7	0	0	7	14
Wolf Pack	14	24	14	7	59

at Mackay Stadium, Reno, Nevada

- Date: November 11, 2017
- Game time: 1:00 p.m. PST
- Game weather: 55 °F (13 °C), sunny
- Game attendance: 14,604
- Referee: Daniel Romeo
- TV announcers (ESPN3): Al Groh and Shawn Kenney
- ESPN Box Score

Game information

First Quarter

- (5:51) SJSU TD: Tyler Nevens 12-yard rush (Bryce Crawford PAT).
- (3:02) NEV TD: Ty Gangi 39-yard pass to Wyatt Demps (Spencer Pettit PAT).
- (1:06) NEV TD: Dameon Barber 6-yard return of blocked punt (Spencer Pettit PAT).

Second Quarter

- (11:55) NEV TD: Ty Gangi 1-yard rush (Spencer Pettit PAT).
- (7:51) NEV TD: Dameon Barber 100-yard interception return (Spencer Pettit PAT).
- (4:28) NEV TD: Ty Gangi 3-yard pass to Wyatt Demps (Spencer Pettit PAT).
- (0:06) NEV FG: Spencer Pettit 20-yard field goal.

Third Quarter

- (10:35) NEV TD: Ty Gangi 6-yard pass to Jaxon Kincaide (Spencer Pettit PAT).
- (1:17) NEV TD: Dameon Barber 39-yard interception return (Spencer Pettit PAT).

Fourth Quarter

- (6:54) NEV TD: Blake Wright 7-yard rush (Spencer Pettit PAT).
- (0:17) SJSU TD: Michael Carrillo 12-yard pass to Sean Pinson (Bryce Crawford PAT).

Passing

- SJSU – Montel Aaron: 9/18, 108 yds, 3 INT
- NEV – Ty Gangi: 16/23, 232 yds, 3 TD

Rushing

- SJSU – Tyler Nevens: 21 att, 118 yds, 1 TD
- NEV – Kelton Moore: 20 att, 79 yds

Receiving

- SJSU – Tre Hartley: 2 rec, 50 yds
- NEV – Wyatt Demps: 7 rec, 115 yds, 2 TD

=== at Colorado State ===
San Jose State Spartans at Colorado State Rams

Quarter	1	2	3	4	Total
Spartans	7	0	0	7	14
Rams	14	14	7	7	42

at Colorado State Stadium, Fort Collins, Colorado

- Date: November 18, 2017
- Game time: 1:30 p.m. MST
- Game weather: 45 °F (7 °C), sunny
- Game attendance: 25,743
- Referee: Michael VanderVelde
- TV announcers (CBSSN): Randy Cross, Jordan Daigle, and John Sadak
- ESPN Box Score

Game information

First Quarter

- (9:58) SJSU TD: DeJon Packer 14-yard rush (Bryce Crawford PAT).
- (7:51) CSU TD: Rashaad Boddie 4-yard rush (Wyatt Bryan PAT).
- (3:53) CSU TD: Rashaad Boddie 6-yard rush (Wyatt Bryan PAT).

Second Quarter

- (9:32) CSU TD: Nick Stevens 50-yard pass to Cameron Butler (Wyatt Bryan PAT).
- (1:18) CSU TD: Nick Stevens 24-yard pass to Bisi Johnson (Wyatt Bryan PAT).

Third Quarter

- (0:24) CSU TD: Nick Stevens 9-yard pass to Dalton Fackrell (Wyatt Bryan PAT).

Fourth Quarter

- (6:47) SJSU TD: Malike Roberson 54-yard rush (Bryce Crawford PAT).
- (4:47) CSU TD: Dalyn Dawkins 4-yard rush (Wyatt Bryan PAT).

Passing

- SJSU – Montel Aaron: 17/33, 208 yds, 1 INT
- CSU – Nick Stevens: 26/32, 305 yds, 3 TD

Rushing

- SJSU – Malike Roberson: 10 att, 72 yds, 1 TD
- CSU – Dalyn Dawkins: 24 att, 138 yds, 1 TD

Receiving

- SJSU – Tre Hartley: 5 rec, 109 yds
- CSU – Cameron Butler: 3 rec, 79 yds, 1 TD

=== Wyoming ===
Wyoming Cowboys at San Jose State Spartans

Quarter	1	2	3	4	Total
Cowboys	0	7	3	7	17
Spartans	7	6	0	7	20

at CEFCU Stadium, San Jose, California

- Date: November 25, 2017
- Game time: 2:00 p.m. PST
- Game weather: 45 °F (7 °C), mostly cloudy
- Game attendance: 12,653
- Referee: Keith Boitmann
- TV announcers (ESPN3): Wayne Randazzo and Jay Taylor
- ESPN Box Score

Game information

First Quarter

- (7:45) SJSU TD: Montel Aaron 5-yard rush (Bryce Crawford PAT).

Second Quarter

- (10:39) SJSU FG: Bryce Crawford 44-yard field goal.
- (4:28) WYO TD: Nick Smith 1-yard rush (Cooper Rothe PAT).
- (0:47) SJSU FG: Bryce Crawford 52-yard field goal.

Third Quarter

- (10:24) WYO FG: Cooper Rothe 28-yard field goal.

Fourth Quarter

- (2:09) SJSU TD: DeJon Packer 44-yard rush (Bryce Crawford PAT).
- (1:07) WYO TD: Nick Smith 53-yard pass to C. J. Johnson (Cooper Rothe PAT).

Passing

- WYO – Nick Smith: 17/37, 171 yds, 1 TD, 2 INT
- SJSU – Montel Aaron: 15/29, 174 yds, 1 INT

Rushing

- WYO – Kellen Overstreet: 17 att, 139 yds
- SJSU – DeJon Packer: 8 att, 75 yds, 1 TD

Receiving

- WYO – C. J. Johnson: 4 rec, 106 yds, 1 TD
- SJSU – Tre Hartley: 7 rec, 109 yds

== Nominations and awards ==
Nominations

- Bronko Nagurski Trophy – Sr. DB Andre Chachere
- Jim Thorpe Award – Sr. DB Andre Chachere
- Lou Groza Award – Jr. K Bryce Crawford
- Rimington Trophy – Sr. C Keoni Taylor
- Wuerffel Trophy – Sr. OT Nate Velichko

Awards

- 2017 Mountain West Football Preseason All-Conference Team – Sr. DB Andre Chachere, Jr. LB Frank Ginda, & Sr. P Michael Carrizosa

== Players in the 2018 NFL draft ==
Player	Position	Round	Pick	NFL club
Jermaine Kelly	CB	7	222	Houston Texans
