= 2016 Idaho Vandals football team =

American college football season

2016 Idaho Vandals football

Famous Idaho Potato Bowl champion

Famous Idaho Potato Bowl, W 61–50 vs. Colorado State
- Conference: Sun Belt Conference
- Record: 9–4 (6–2 Sun Belt)
- Head coach: Paul Petrino (4th season)
- Offensive coordinator: Kris Cinkovich (4th season)
- Offensive scheme: Multiple
- Defensive coordinator: Mike Breske (2nd season)
- Base defense: Multiple 3–4
- Home stadium: Kibbie Dome

2016 Sun Belt Conference football standings
	Conf.			Overall
Team	W		L	W		L
Appalachian State +	7	–	1	10	–	3
Arkansas State +	7	–	1	8	–	5
Troy	6	–	2	10	–	3
Idaho	6	–	2	9	–	4
Louisiana–Lafayette	5	–	3	6	–	7
Georgia Southern	4	–	4	5	–	7
Louisiana–Monroe	3	–	5	4	–	8
South Alabama	2	–	6	6	–	7
Georgia State	2	–	6	3	–	9
New Mexico State	2	–	6	3	–	9
Texas State	0	–	8	2	–	10
+ – Conference co-champions

The 2016 Idaho Vandals football team represented the University of Idaho in the Sun Belt Conference during the 2016 NCAA Division I FBS football season. Led by fourth-year head coach Paul Petrino, the Vandals played their home games on campus at the Kibbie Dome in Moscow, Idaho. A football-only member of the Sun Belt, Idaho finished the regular season at 8–4 (6–2 in Sun Belt, third).

The Vandals were invited to the Famous Idaho Potato Bowl in Boise and defeated Colorado State 61–50 to finish at 9–4. It was the program's final bowl game as an FBS team and last winning season for six years.

== Preseason ==
=== Sun Belt coaches poll ===
The Sun Belt coaches preseason prediction poll was released on July 21, 2016. The Vandals were predicted to finish eighth in the conference.

Sun Belt coaches poll
Predicted finish	Team	Votes (1st place)
1	Appalachian State	114 (5)
2	Arkansas State	110 (5)
3	Georgia Southern	98 (1)
4	Georgia State	73
5	Louisiana–Lafayette	70
5	Troy	70
7	South Alabama	62
8	Idaho	48
9	New Mexico State	37
10	Texas State	30
11	Louisiana–Monroe	14

== Schedule ==
Idaho announced their 2016 football schedule on March 3, with five of the twelve games at home.

Date	Time	Opponent	Site	TV	Result	Attendance
September 1	6:00 pm	Montana State*	Kibbie Dome; Moscow, ID	SWX	W 20–17	11,987
September 10	2:00 pm	at No. 8 Washington*	Husky Stadium; Seattle, WA	P12N	L 14–59	60,678
September 17	11:00 am	at Washington State*	Martin Stadium; Pullman, WA (Battle of the Palouse)	P12N	L 6–56	28,477
September 24	6:00 pm	at UNLV*	Sam Boyd Stadium; Whitney, NV	CI	W 33–30 ^{OT}	17,229
October 1	2:00 pm	Troy^{†}	Kibbie Dome; Moscow, ID	ESPN3	L 13–34	13,392
October 8	4:00 pm	at Louisiana–Monroe	Malone Stadium; Monroe, LA	ESPN3	W 34–31	9,524
October 15	2:00 pm	New Mexico State	Kibbie Dome; Moscow, ID	SWX	W 55–23	10,278
October 22	12:30 pm	at Appalachian State	Kidd Brewer Stadium; Boone, NC	ESPN3	L 19–37	26,931
November 5	2:00 pm	at Louisiana–Lafayette	Cajun Field; Lafayette, LA	ESPN3	W 23–13	21,367
November 12	1:00 pm	at Texas State	Bobcat Stadium; San Marcos, TX	ESPN3	W 47–14	15,314
November 26	12:30 pm	South Alabama	Kibbie Dome; Moscow, ID	ASN	W 38–31	9,049
December 3	2:00 pm	Georgia State	Kibbie Dome; Moscow, ID	ESPN3	W 37–12	11,242
December 22	4:00 pm	vs. Colorado State*	Albertsons Stadium; Boise, ID (Famous Idaho Potato Bowl)	ESPN	W 61–50	24,975
*Non-conference game; ^{†}Homecoming; Rankings from AP Poll released prior to game; All times are in Pacific time

== Personnel ==
2016 Idaho Vandals football team roster
Players
Coaches
Offense

Pos.	#	Name	Class
WR	1	Alfonso Onunwor	Jr
WR	2	David Ungerer	So
TE	3	Deon Watson	Sr
QB	4	Mason Petrino	Fr
WR	6	Callen Hightower	Sr
WR	7	Jante Boston	Fr
WR	8	Jacob Sannon	Jr
QB	10	Matt Linehan	Jr
QB	12	A. J. Woodin	So
TE	13	Trent Cowan	Sr
WR	14	Brandon Luckett	Fr
QB	15	Gunnar Amos	Fr
RB	21	Isaiah Saunders	So
RB	22	Doug Coman	Jr
RB	23	Aaron Duckworth	Jr
RB	24	Denzal Brantley	Fr
WR	26	Reuben Mwehla	Jr
WR	27	Jordan Frysinger	Sr
RB	28	Dylan Thigpen	Fr
RB	30	Zach Bafus	Fr
RB	36	Andrew Sibley	Fr
FB	38	Brady Strodtbeck	Jr
FB	45	Josh Herman	Jr
FB	47	Luke Hyde	Fr
FB	49	Luke Johnson	Fr
OL	58	Austin Phillips	So
OL	59	Koa Wilkins	Fr
OL	60	D. J. Luby	Fr
OL	61	Steven Matlock	Sr
OL	63	Calvin White	Sr
OL	66	Conner Vrba	Fr
OL	67	Mason Woods	Sr
OL	69	Kato Fawkes	GS
OL	70	Zion Dixon	Fr
OL	71	Brett Carter	Fr
OL	72	Patrick Johnson	So
OL	74	Noah Johnson	Fr
OL	75	Darius Peterson	Sr
OL	76	Jordan Rose	Jr
OL	77	Tanner Mauseth	Fr
TE	80	Eric Lemke	GS
WR	81	Josh Ellingson	Fr
WR	83	Elijah Sapico	Fr
WR	84	Micah Hamilton	Fr
TE	85	Joseph Wysocki	Fr
WR	87	Cade Smith	Fr
WR	88	Michael Garner	Fr

Defense

Pos.	#	Name	Class
S	1	D. J. Olmstead	Jr
S	2	D. J. Hampton	Sr
LB	3	Kaden Elliss	So
CB	4	Jayshawn Jordan	Sr
DB	5	Lloyd Hightower	Fr
CB	6	Kendrick Trotter	GS
Buck	7	Khalin Smith	Sr
CB	8	Armond Hawkins	Jr
S	10	Ty Graham	Fr
S	11	Russell Siavii	Sr
DL	13	Kevin Shelton	Sr
LB	14	Jaden Gardner	Fr
DL	15	Glen Antoine	Sr
LB	16	Tarik Littlejohn	Fr
DB	18	Kasheen Greene	Jr
DB	20	Dorian Clark	Jr
DB	21	Jordan Grabski	Jr
LB	22	Leonard Hazewood IV	Jr
DB	23	Calvary Pugh	So
S	24	Alec Nordsieck	Fr
S	25	Desmond Banks	Jr
DB	29	Sedrick Thomas	Fr
DB	31	Qendarrion Barnett	Fr
LB	32	Aaron Pue	Fr
LB	33	Tony Lashley	So
Buck	34	Jack Bamis	Fr
S	35	Jack Tate	Jr
LB	39	Vaughn Daggs	Fr
LB	40	Mike Linehan	Fr
LB	41	Dylan Beeler	Fr
LB	43	Charles Akanno	Fr
DL	44	Tueni Lupeamanu	Sr
LB	50	Ed Hall	So
DE	51	Wayne Eades II	Fr
LB	54	Mason Ulrich	Fr
DT	55	Rahsaan Crawford	Fr
DL	62	Colton Thrasher	So
DE	82	Will Schmidt	Jr
DL	90	Zach Cable	Jr
DL	91	Eric Hale	Fr
DL	92	Mytreal Denson	Fr
DL	93	Arie Anderson	Jr
DE	96	Gavin Whitesitt	Fr
DE	97	Aikeem Coleman	Jr

Special teams

Pos.	#	Name	Class
K, P	5	Austin Rehkow	Sr
K	15	Cade Coffey	Fr
LS	37	Alex Boatman	So
K	52	Sam Fenlason	Fr
LS	95	Brett Ballard	GS
LS	98	Garrett Wideen	Fr

Head coach

- Paul Petrino

Coordinators/assistant coaches

- Kris Cinkovich
  Associate head coach/Offensive coordinator/
  Offensive line
- Mike Breske
  Defensive coordinator/Safeties
- Eric Brown
  Linebackers
- Kenny Holmes
  Defensive line
- Charley Molnar
  Quarterbacks
- Troy Purcell
  Inside linebackers
- Al Pupunu
  Tight ends
- Jason Shumaker
  Running backs/Recruiting coordinator/
  Special teams coordinator
- Aric Williams
  Cornerbacks

Legend

- (C) Team captain
- (S) Suspended
- (I) Ineligible
- Injured
- Redshirt

Roster

== Game summaries ==
=== Montana State ===
Montana State Bobcats at Idaho Vandals – Game summary

Quarter	1	2	3	4	Total
Bobcats	7	3	7	0	17
Vandals	17	3	0	0	20

at Kibbie Dome, Moscow, Idaho

- Date: September 1
- Game time: 6:00 p.m. PDT
- Game weather: None (played indoors)
- Game attendance: 11,987
- Referee: Charles Lewis
- TV: SWX
- Box score, Recap

Game information
First quarter
- IDHO – Austin Rehkow 44-yard field goal, 13:38. Vandals 3–0. Drive: 5 plays, 39 yards, 1:22.
- MTST – Justin Paige 12-yard pass from Tyler Bruggman (Devon Tandberg kick), 8:17. Bobcats 7–3. Drive: 12 plays, 75 yards, 5:21.
- IDHO – Aaron Duckworth 43-yard run (Austin Rehkow kick), 7:38. Vandals 10–7. Drive: 3 plays, 74 yards, 0:39.
- IDHO – Aaron Duckworth 1-yard run (Austin Rehkow kick), 4:04. Vandals 17–7. Drive: 4 plays, 24 yards, 1:24.

Second quarter

- IDHO – Austin Rehkow 34-yard field goal, 8:09. Vandals 20–7. Drive: 11 plays, 59 yards, 4:58.
- MTST – Devon Tandberg 33-yard field goal, 1:40. Vandals 20–10. Drive: 5 plays, 15 yards, 2:15.

Third quarter

- MTST – Chad Newell 3-yard run (Devon Tandberg kick), 9:22. Vandals 20–17. Drive: 13 plays, 81 yards, 5:38.

Fourth quarter

- No scoring plays

Statistics	MTST	IDHO
First downs	19	15
Total yards	305	357
Rushing yards	110	229
Passing yards	195	128
Turnovers	1	2
Time of possession	36:14	23:46

Team	Category	Player	Statistics
Montana State	Passing	Tyler Bruggman	19/35, 191 yards, TD, INT
Montana State	Rushing	Chad Newell	25 rushes, 105 yards, TD
Montana State	Receiving	Mitchell Herbert	4 receptions, 62 yards
Idaho	Passing	Matt Linehan	8/22, 128 yards, INT
Idaho	Rushing	Aaron Duckworth	15 rushes, 112 yards, 2 TD
Idaho	Receiving	Deon Watson	2 receptions, 67 yards

=== At No. 8 Washington ===
Idaho Vandals at No. 8 Washington Huskies – Game summary

Quarter	1	2	3	4	Total
Vandals	0	0	7	7	14
No. 8 Huskies	7	28	14	10	59

at Husky Stadium, Seattle, Washington

- Date: September 10
- Game time: 2:00 p.m. PDT
- Game weather: Clear, 71 °F (22 °C)
- Game attendance: 60,678
- Referee: Terry Leyden
- TV announcers (P12N): J. B. Long, Glenn Parker, and Jill Savage
- Box score, Recap

Game information
First quarter
- WASH – Dante Pettis 21-yard pass from Jake Browning (Cameron Van Winkle kick), 14:44. Huskies 7–0. Drive: 1 play, 21 yards, 0:10.

Second quarter

- WASH – Dante Pettis 7-yard pass from Jake Browning (Cameron Van Winkle kick), 12:09. Huskies 14–0. Drive: 5 plays, 41 yards, 1:25.
- WASH – Chico McClatcher 30-yard pass from Jake Browning (Cameron Van Winkle kick), 7:37. Huskies 21–0. Drive: 6 plays, 85 yards, 2:20.
- WASH – Myles Gaskin 7-yard run (Cameron Van Winkle kick), 3:25. Huskies 28–0. Drive: 6 plays, 45 yards, 2:11.
- WASH – John Ross III 9-yard pass from Jake Browning (Cameron Van Winkle kick), 1:00. Huskies 35–0. Drive: 7 plays, 72 yards, 1:02.

Third quarter

- WASH – John Ross III 8-yard pass from Jake Browning (Cameron Van Winkle kick), 12:05. Huskies 42–0. Drive: 6 plays, 65 yards, 2:55.
- IDHO – Trent Cowan 20-yard pass from Matt Linehan (Austin Rehkow kick), 4:44. Huskies 42–7. Drive: 8 plays, 80 yards, 3:09.
- WASH – Quinten Pounds 26-yard pass from K. J. Carta-Samuels (Cameron Van Winkle kick), 2:13. Huskies 49–7. Drive: 5 plays, 49 yards, 2:24.

Fourth quarter

- IDHO – Gunnar Amos 6-yard run (Austin Rehkow kick), 10:41. Huskies 49–14. Drive: 15 plays, 75 yards, 6:32.
- WASH – Cameron Van Winkle 34-yard field goal, 5:21. Huskies 52–14. Drive: 10 plays, 47 yards, 5:11.
- WASH – Connor O'Brien 46-yard interception return (Cameron Van Winkle kick), 3:05. Huskies 59–14.

Statistics	IDHO	WASH
First downs	17	27
Total yards	322	482
Rushing yards	104	126
Passing yards	218	356
Turnovers	3	1
Time of possession	33:15	26:45

Team	Category	Player	Statistics
Idaho	Passing	Matt Linehan	19/29, 187 yards, TD
Idaho	Rushing	Mason Petrino	9 rushes, 48 yards
Idaho	Receiving	Isaiah Saunders	2 receptions, 54 yards
Washington	Passing	Jake Browning	23/28, 294 yards, 5 TD
Washington	Rushing	Myles Gaskin	12 rushes, 67 yards, TD
Washington	Receiving	Dante Pettis	6 receptions, 88 yards, 2 TD

=== At Washington State ===
Idaho Vandals at Washington State Cougars – Game summary

Quarter	1	2	3	4	Total
Vandals	3	0	3	0	6
Cougars	7	14	7	28	56

at Martin Stadium, Pullman, Washington

- Date: September 17
- Game time: 11:00 a.m. PDT
- Game weather: Overcast, 64 °F (18 °C)
- Game attendance: 28,477
- Referee: Mark Duddy
- TV: P12N
- Box score, Recap

Game information
First quarter
- IDHO – Austin Rehkow 42-yard field goal, 9:47. Vandals 3–0. Drive: 9 plays, 29 yards, 3:40.
- WSU – James Williams 2-yard run (Erik Powell kick), 0:22. Cougars 7–3. Drive: 9 plays, 82 yards, 3:07.

Second quarter

- WSU – Marcellus Pippins 72-yard blocked kick return (Erik Powell kick), 7:35. Cougars 14–3.
- WSU – Gabe Marks 8-yard pass from Luke Falk (Erik Powell kick), 4:02. Cougars 21–3. Drive: 6 plays, 36 yards, 1:36.

Third quarter

- IDHO – Austin Rehkow 18-yard field goal, 8:47. Cougars 21–6. Drive: 9 plays, 61 yards, 3:30.
- WSU – Gerard Wicks 2-yard run (Erik Powell kick), 2:50. Cougars 28–6. Drive: 14 plays, 90 yards, 5:49.

Fourth quarter

- WSU – Robert Lewis 10-yard pass from Luke Falk (Erik Powell kick), 13:05. Cougars 35–6. Drive: 9 plays, 63 yards, 3:36.
- WSU – Kyle Sweet 9-yard pass from Luke Falk (Erik Powell kick), 8:52. Cougars 42–6. Drive: 5 plays, 32 yards, 2:18.
- WSU – Gerard Wicks 11-yard fumble return (Erik Powell kick), 8:43. Cougars 49–6.
- WSU – Alijah Lee 6-yard run (Erik Powell kick), 1:02. Cougars 56–6. Drive: 4 plays, 55 yards, 1:09.

Statistics	IDHO	WSU
First downs	15	26
Total yards	257	509
Rushing yards	78	228
Passing yards	179	281
Turnovers	2	1
Time of possession	30:40	29:20

Team	Category	Player	Statistics
Idaho	Passing	Matt Linehan	19/33, 172 yards
Idaho	Rushing	Aaron Duckworth	13 rushes, 43 yards
Idaho	Receiving	Deon Watson	5 receptions, 62 yards
Washington State	Passing	Luke Falk	21/36, 226 yards, 3 TD
Washington State	Rushing	James Williams	14 rushes, 126 yards, TD
Washington State	Receiving	Kyle Sweet	4 receptions, 77 yards, TD

=== At UNLV ===
Idaho Vandals at UNLV Rebels – Game summary

Quarter	1	2	3	4	OT	Total
Vandals	7	10	3	7	6	33
Rebels	0	14	3	10	3	30

at Sam Boyd Stadium, Whitney, Nevada

- Date: September 24
- Game time: 6:00 p.m. PDT
- Game weather: Clear, 86 °F (30 °C)
- Game attendance: 17,229
- Referee: Ted Pitts
- TV announcers (CI): Tony Cordasco and Caleb Herring
- Box score, Recap

Game information
First quarter
- IDHO – Kaden Elliss 31-yard interception return (Austin Kehdow kick), 10:30. Vandals 7–0.

Second quarter

- IDHO – Austin Rehkow 40-yard field goal, 11:48. Vandals 10–0. Drive: 8 plays, 43 yards, 3:07.
- UNLV – Lexington Thomas 3-yard run (Evan Pantels kick), 9:04. Vandals 10–7. Drive: 6 plays, 60 yards, 2:44.
- IDHO – Aaron Duckworth 4-yard run (Austin Rehkow kick), 4:58. Vandals 17–7. Drive: 9 plays, 75 yards, 4:06.
- UNLV – Marc Philippi 4-yard pass from Johnny Stanton (Evan Pantels kick), 0:59. Vandals 17–14. Drive: 8 plays, 54 yards, 3:48.

Third quarter

- IDHO – Austin Rehkow 33-yard field goal, 11:45. Vandals 20–14. Drive: 8 plays, 58 yards, 3:10.
- UNLV – Evan Pantels 32-yard field goal, 6:05. Vandals 20–17. Drive: 11 plays, 63 yards, 5:36.

Fourth quarter

- UNLV – Evan Pantels 24-yard field goal, 8:29. Tied 20–20. Drive: 13 plays, 85 yards, 6:31.
- IDHO – Matt Linehan 7-yard run (Austin Rehkow kick), 6:14. Vandals 27–20. Drive: 5 plays, 70 yards, 2:09.
- UNLV – Lexington Thomas 55-yard run (Evan Pantels kick), 5:09. Tied 27–27. Drive: 3 plays, 83 yards, 1:01.

Overtime

- UNLV – Evan Pantels 23-yard field goal. Rebels 30–27. Drive: 5 plays, 20 yards.
- IDHO – Callen Hightower 11-yard pass from Matt Linehan. Vandals 33–30. Drive: 5 plays, 25 yards.

Statistics	IDHO	UNLV
First downs	21	26
Total yards	378	539
Rushing yards	129	364
Passing yards	249	175
Turnovers	1	2
Time of possession	26:47	33:13

Team	Category	Player	Statistics
Idaho	Passing	Matt Linehan	17/35, 249 yards, TD
Idaho	Rushing	Aaron Duckworth	20 rushes, 90 yards, TD
Idaho	Receiving	Callen Hightower	4 receptions, 67 yards, TD
UNLV	Passing	Johnny Stanton	14/26, 175 yards, TD, 2 INT
UNLV	Rushing	Lexington Thomas	19 rushes, 160 yards, 2 TD
UNLV	Receiving	Darren Woods Jr.	4 receptions, 66 yards

=== Troy ===
Troy Trojans at Idaho Vandals – Game summary

Quarter	1	2	3	4	Total
Trojans	14	7	13	0	34
Vandals	6	0	0	7	13

at Kibbie Dome, Moscow, Idaho

- Date: October 1
- Game time: 2:00 p.m. PDT
- Game weather: None (played indoors)
- Game attendance: 13,392
- Referee: Kevin Stine
- TV: ESPN3
- Box score, Recap

Game information
First quarter
- IDHO – Austin Rehkow 21-yard field goal, 8:49. Vandals 3–0. Drive: 14 plays, 71 yards, 6:11.
- IDHO – Austin Rehkow 42-yard field goal, 6:20. Vandals 6–0. Drive: 4 plays, -4 yards, 2:01.
- TROY – Tevaris McCormick 36-yard pass from Brandon Silvers (Ryan Kay kick), 5:27. Trojans 7–6. Drive: 4 plays, 75 yards, 0:53.
- TROY – Emanuel Thompson 14-yard pass from Brandon Silvers (Ryan Kay kick), 0:20. Trojans 14–6. Drive: 7 plays, 54 yards, 3:11.

Second quarter

- TROY – Jordan Chunn 12-yard run (Ryan Kay kick), 3:39. Trojans 21–6. Drive: 10 plays, 74 yards, 3:56.

Third quarter

- TROY – John Johnson 60-yard pass from Brandon Silvers (Ryan Kay kick), 14:46. Trojans 28–6. Drive: 1 play, 60 yards, 0:14.
- TROY – Ryan Kay 25-yard field goal, 7:43. Trojans 31–6. Drive: 12 plays, 64 yards, 4:32.
- TROY – Ryan Kay 31-yard field goal, 3:45. Trojans 34–6. Drive: 5 plays, 16 yards, 1:28.

Fourth quarter

- IDHO – Trent Cowan 22-yard pass from Matt Linehan (Austin Rehkow kick), 14:09. Trojans 34–13. Drive: 11 plays, 75 yards, 4:36.

Statistics	TROY	IDHO
First downs	27	19
Total yards	530	255
Rushing yards	157	89
Passing yards	373	166
Turnovers	3	2
Time of possession	29:39	30:21

Team	Category	Player	Statistics
Troy	Passing	Brandon Silvers	31/42, 373 yards, 3 TD, 2 INT
Troy	Rushing	Jordan Chunn	22 rushes, 137 yards, TD
Troy	Receiving	John Johnson	7 receptions, 128 yards, TD
Idaho	Passing	Matt Linehan	19/34, 166 yards, TD, 2 INT
Idaho	Rushing	Aaron Duckworth	15 rushes, 50 yards
Idaho	Receiving	Trent Cowan	5 receptions, 58 yards, TD

=== At Louisiana–Monroe ===
Idaho Vandals at Louisiana–Monroe Warhawks – Game summary

Quarter	1	2	3	4	Total
Vandals	16	8	7	3	34
Warhawks	0	21	3	7	31

at Malone Stadium, Monroe, Louisiana

- Date: October 8
- Game time: 4:00 p.m. PDT/6:00 p.m. CDT
- Game weather: Clear, 77 °F (25 °C)
- Game attendance: 9,524
- Referee: Jason McArthur
- TV: ESPN3
- Box score, Recap

Game information
First quarter
- IDHO – Austin Rehkow 28-yard field goal, 9:01. Vandals 3–0. Drive: 15 plays, 64 yards, 5:59.
- IDHO – Austin Rehkow 34-yard field goal, 6:56. Vandals 6–0. Drive: 4 plays, 1 yard, 1:03.
- IDHO – Austin Rehkow 32-yard field goal, 2:36. Vandals 9–0. Drive: 9 plays, 20 yards, 3:33.
- IDHO – Kendrick Trotter 19-yard blocked punt return (Austin Rehkow kick), 1:18. Vandals 16–0.

Second quarter

- ULM – Ben Luckett 31-yard run (Craig Ford kick), 13:31. Vandals 16–7. Drive: 8 plays, 78 yards, 2:47.
- IDHO – Aaron Duckworth 2-yard run (Matt Linehan pass to David Ungerer), 10:59. Vandals 24–7. Drive: 5 plays, 73 yards, 2:32.
- ULM – Garrett Smith 6-yard run (Craig Ford kick), 7:42. Vandals 24–14. Drive: 9 plays, 75 yards, 3:17.
- ULM – Xavier Brown 44-yard pass from Garrett Smith (Craig Ford kick), 1:25. Vandals 24–21. Drive: 11 plays, 90 yards, 2:45.

Third quarter

- ULM – Craig Ford 31-yard field goal, 6:40. Tied 24–24. Drive: 10 plays, 79 yards, 4:34.
- IDHO – Jordan Frysinger 71-yard pass from Matt Linehan (Austin Rehkow kick), 5:46. Vandals 31–24. Drive: 2 plays, 69 yards, 0:54.

Fourth quarter

- ULM – Ajalen Holley 30-yard pass from Garrett Smith (Craig Ford kick), 2:28. Tied 31–31. Drive: 5 plays, 80 yards, 1:52.
- IDHO – Austin Rehkow 27-yard field goal, 0:00. Vandals 34–31. Drive: 6 plays, 67 yards, 2:28.

Statistics	IDHO	ULM
First downs	18	27
Total yards	414	523
Rushing yards	203	221
Passing yards	211	302
Turnovers	0	4
Time of possession	31:01	28:59

Team	Category	Player	Statistics
Idaho	Passing	Matt Linehan	21/38, 211 yards, TD
Idaho	Rushing	Aaron Duckworth	16 rushes, 121 yards, TD
Idaho	Receiving	Jordan Frysinger	4 receptions, 100 yards, TD
Louisiana–Monroe	Passing	Garrett Smith	20/38, 302 yards, 2 TD, 3 INT
Louisiana–Monroe	Rushing	Garrett Smith	13 rushes, 88 yards, TD
Louisiana–Monroe	Receiving	Xavier Brown	3 receptions, 96 yards, TD

=== New Mexico State ===
New Mexico State Aggies at Idaho Vandals – Game summary

Quarter	1	2	3	4	Total
Aggies	13	3	0	7	23
Vandals	7	20	21	7	55

at Kibbie Dome, Moscow, Idaho

- Date: October 15
- Game time: 2:00 p.m. PDT
- Game weather: None (played indoors)
- Game attendance: 10,278
- Referee: Ted Pitts
- TV: SWX
- Box score, Recap

Game information
First quarter
- NMSU – Izaiah Lottie 68-yard pass from Tyler Rogers (kick failed), 10:06. Aggies 6–0. Drive: 3 plays, 75 yards, 0:47.
- IDHO – Deon Watson 9-yard pass from Matt Linehan (Austin Rehkow kick), 4:56. Vandals 7–6. Drive: 10 plays, 75 yards, 5:10.
- NMSU – Clayton Granch 10-yard pass from Tyler Rogers (Parker Davidson kick), 2:43. Aggies 13–7. Drive: 6 plays, 75 yards, 2:13.

Second quarter

- IDHO – Denzal Brantley 4-yard run (Austin Rehkow kick), 14:55. Vandals 14–13. Drive: 7 plays, 78 yards, 2:44.
- IDHO – Austin Rehkow 33-yard field goal, 10:37. Vandals 17–13. Drive: 8 plays, 35 yards, 2:43.
- IDHO – Alfonso Onunwor 7-yard pass from Matt Linehan (Austin Rehkow kick), 4:30. Vandals 24–13. Drive: 10 plays, 55 yards, 5:06.
- IDHO – Austin Rehkow 37-yard field goal, 1:08. Vandals 27–13. Drive: 5 plays, 70 yards, 1:18.
- NMSU – Parker Davidson 35-yard field goal, 0:00. Vandals 27–16. Drive: 9 plays, 58 yards, 1:08.

Third quarter

- IDHO – Aaron Duckworth 19-yard pass from Matt Linehan (Austin Rehkow kick), 10:36. Vandals 34–16. Drive: 6 plays, 77 yards, 2:21.
- IDHO – Jordan Frysinger 78-yard pass from Matt Linehan (Austin Rehkow kick), 8:02. Vandals 41–16. Drive: 1 play, 78 yards, 0:11.
- IDHO – Isaiah Saunders 1-yard run (Austin Rehkow kick), 1:08. Vandals 48–16. Drive: 11 plays, 60 yards, 5:37.

Fourth quarter

- IDHO – Matt Linehan 10-yard run (Austin Rehkow kick), 12:19. Vandals 55–16. Drive: 5 plays, 36 yards, 2:34.
- NMSU – Jaleel Scott 45-yard pass from Nick Jeanty (Parker Davidson kick), 1:12. Vandals 55–23. Drive: 6 plays, 81 yards, 1:31.

Statistics	NMSU	IDHO
First downs	17	34
Total yards	428	651
Rushing yards	62	169
Passing yards	366	482
Turnovers	2	1
Time of possession	21:03	38:57

Team	Category	Player	Statistics
New Mexico State	Passing	Tyler Rogers	19/29, 302 yards, 2 TD
New Mexico State	Rushing	Larry Rose III	11 rushes, 32 yards
New Mexico State	Receiving	Tyrian Taylor	4 receptions, 110 yards
Idaho	Passing	Matt Linehan	29/36, 476 yards, 4 TD, INT
Idaho	Rushing	Isaiah Saunders	12 rushes, 59 yards, TD
Idaho	Receiving	Deon Watson	6 receptions, 129 yards,td

=== At Appalachian State ===
Idaho Vandals at Appalachian State Mountaineers – Game summary

Quarter	1	2	3	4	Total
Vandals	0	6	3	10	19
Mountaineers	10	0	13	14	37

at Kidd Brewer Stadium, Boone, North Carolina

- Date: October 22
- Game time: 12:30 p.m. PDT/3:30 EDT
- Game weather: Fair, 46 °F (8 °C)
- Game attendance: 26,931
- Referee: Jason Autrey
- TV: ESPN3
- Box score, Recap

Statistics	IDHO	APP
First downs		
Total yards		
Rushing yards		
Passing yards		
Turnovers		
Time of possession		

Team	Category	Player	Statistics
Idaho	Passing		
Idaho	Rushing		
Idaho	Receiving		
Appalachian State	Passing		
Appalachian State	Rushing		
Appalachian State	Receiving		

=== At Louisiana–Lafayette ===
Idaho Vandals at Louisiana–Lafayette Ragin' Cajuns – Game summary

Quarter	1	2	3	4	Total
Vandals	10	7	3	3	23
Ragin' Cajuns	3	10	0	0	13

at Cajun Field, Lafayette, Louisiana

- Date: November 5
- Game time: 2:00 p.m. PDT/4:00 p.m. CDT
- Game weather: Clear, 81 °F (27 °C)
- Game attendance: 21,367
- Referee: Kevin Stine
- TV: ESPN3
- Box score, Recap

Game information

First quarter

- IDAHO - Denzal Brantley 1-yard TD run, Austin Rehkow kick good, 10:15 (IDAHO 7-0)
- ULL - Stevie Artigue 37-yard field goal, 8:13 (IDAHO 7-3)
- IDAHO - Rehkow 29-yard field goal, 4:51 (IDAHO 10-3)

Second quarter

- ULL - Anthony Jennings 3-yard TD run, Artigue kick good, 13:31 (TIE 10-10)
- IDAHO - Isaiah Saunders 1-yard TD run, Rehkow kick good, 4:33 (IDAHO 17-10)
- ULL - Artigue 29-yard field goal, 0:28 (IDAHO 17-13)

Third quarter

- IDAHO - Rehkow 50-yard field goal, 4:29 (IDAHO 20-13)

Fourth quarter

- IDAHO - Rehkow 44-yard field goal, 7:22 (IDAHO 23-13)

Statistics	IDHO	ULL
First downs	22	18
Total yards	384	266
Rushing yards	157	105
Passing yards	227	161
Turnovers	0	0
Time of possession	32:32	27:28

Team	Category	Player	Statistics
Idaho	Passing	Matt Linehan	20/30, 227 yards
Idaho	Rushing	Isaiah Saunders	21 carries, 86 yards, TD
Idaho	Receiving	Isaiah Saunders	5 receptions, 55 yards
Louisiana–Lafayette	Passing	Anthony Jennings	17/30, 161 yards
Louisiana–Lafayette	Rushing	Elijah McGuire	17 carries, 55 yards
Louisiana–Lafayette	Receiving	Michael Jacquet	3 receptions, 77 yards

=== At Texas State ===
Idaho Vandals at Texas State Bobcats – Game summary

Quarter	1	2	3	4	Total
Vandals	14	17	9	7	47
Bobcats	14	0	0	0	14

at Bobcat Stadium, San Marcos, Texas

- Date: November 12
- Game time: 1:00 p.m. PST/3:00 p.m. CST
- Game weather: Partly cloudy, 75 °F (24 °C)
- Game attendance: 15,314
- Referee: Jason Autrey
- TV: ESPN3
- Box score, Recap

Statistics	IDHO	TXST
First downs		
Total yards		
Rushing yards		
Passing yards		
Turnovers		
Time of possession		

Team	Category	Player	Statistics
Idaho	Passing		
Idaho	Rushing		
Idaho	Receiving		
Texas State	Passing		
Texas State	Rushing		
Texas State	Receiving		

=== South Alabama ===
South Alabama Jaguars at Idaho Vandals – Game summary

Quarter	1	2	3	4	Total
Jaguars	7	14	7	3	31
Vandals	14	10	7	7	38

at Kibbie Dome, Moscow, Idaho

- Date: November 26
- Game time: 12:30 p.m. PST
- Game weather: None (played indoors)
- Game attendance: 9,049
- Referee: Jason McArthur
- TV: ASN
- Box score, Recap

Statistics	USA	IDHO
First downs		
Total yards		
Rushing yards		
Passing yards		
Turnovers		
Time of possession		

Team	Category	Player	Statistics
South Alabama	Passing		
South Alabama	Rushing		
South Alabama	Receiving		
Idaho	Passing		
Idaho	Rushing		
Idaho	Receiving		

=== Georgia State ===
Georgia State Panthers at Idaho Vandals – Game summary

Quarter	1	2	3	4	Total
Panthers	6	6	0	0	12
Vandals	14	10	10	3	37

at Kibbie Dome, Moscow, Idaho

- Date: December 3
- Game time: 2:00 p.m.
- Game weather: None (played indoors)
- Game attendance: 11,242
- Referee: Jason Autry
- TV: ESPN3
- Box score, Recap

Statistics	GAST	IDHO
First downs		
Total yards		
Rushing yards		
Passing yards		
Turnovers		
Time of possession		

Team	Category	Player	Statistics
Georgia State	Passing		
Georgia State	Rushing		
Georgia State	Receiving		
Idaho	Passing		
Idaho	Rushing		
Idaho	Receiving		

=== Vs. Colorado State (Famous Idaho Potato Bowl) ===
Idaho Vandals vs. Colorado State Rams (Famous Idaho Bowl) – Game summary

Quarter	1	2	3	4	Total
Vandals	0	20	21	20	61
Rams	0	7	7	36	50

at Albertsons Stadium, Boise, Idaho

- Date: December 22
- Game time: 4:00 p.m. PST/5:00 p.m. MST
- Game weather: Mostly cloudy, 22 °F (−6 °C)
- Game attendance: 24,975
- Referee: Tracy Jones
- TV announcers (ESPN): Dave Neal, Matt Stinchcomb, and Olivia Harlan
- Box score, Recap

Game information
First quarter
- No scoring plays

Second quarter

- CSU – Bisi Johnson 52-yard pass from Nick Stevens (Wyatt Bryan kick), 14:35. Rams 7–0. Drive: 6 plays, 84 yards, 1:28.
- IDHO – Isaiah Saunders 2-yard run (kick failed), 12:03. Rams 7–6. Drive: 6 plays, 65 yards, 2:32.
- IDHO – Isaiah Saunders 26-yard run (Austin Rehkow kick), 9:59. Vandals 13–7. Drive: 3 plays, 62 yards, 0:56.
- IDHO – Jacob Sannon 6-yard pass from Matt Linehan (Austin Rehkow kick), 0:24. Vandals 20–7. Drive: 18 plays, 85 yards, 6:44.

Third quarter

- IDHO – Matt Linehan 7-yard run (Austin Rehkow kick), 11:12. Vandals 27–7. Drive: 9 plays, 69 yards, 3:48.
- IDHO – Deon Watson 74-yard pass from Matt Linehan (Austin Rehkow kick), 8:13. Vandals 34–7. Drive: 1 play, 79 yards, 0:18.
- IDHO – Jacob Shannon 16-yard pass from Matt Linehan (Austin Rehkow kick), 3:16. Vandals 41–7. Drive: 3 plays, 14 yards, 0:53.
- CSU – Michael Gallup 12-yard pass from Nick Stevens (Wyatt Bryan kick), 1:43. Vandals 41–14. Drive: 5 plays, 91 yards, 1:33.

Fourth quarter

- IDHO – Aaron Duckworth 5-yard run (Austin Rehkow kick), 12:56. Vandals 48–14. Drive: 7 plays, 69 yards, 3:47.
- CSU – Bisi Johnson 73-yard pass from Nick Stevens (Wyatt Bryan kick), 12:21. Vandals 48–21. Drive: 2 plays, 86 yards, 0:35.
- IDHO – Jordan Frysinger 54-yard pass from Matt Linehan (Austin Rehkow kick), 9:27. Vandals 55–21. Drive: 5 plays, 76 yards, 2:54.
- CSU – Michael Gallup 60-yard pass from Nick Stevens (Wyatt Bryan kick), 9:06. Vandals 55–28. Drive: 1 play, 60 yards, 0:21.
- IDHO – Isaiah Saunders 12-yard run (kick failed), 7:40. Vandals 61–28. Drive: 3 plays, 24 yards, 1:26.
- CSU – Michael Gallup 3-yard pass from Nick Stevens (Wyatt Bryan kick), 5:29. Vandals 61–35. Drive: 9 plays, 64 yards, 2:11.
- CSU – Dalyn Dawkins 22-yard run (Wyatt Bryan kick), 1:07. Vandals 61–42. Drive: 4 plays, 57 yards, 1:09.
- CSU – Izzy Matthews 1-yard run (Nick Stevens pass to Bisi Johnson), 0:29. Vandals 61–50. Drive: 3 plays, 54 yards, 0:38.

Statistics	IDHO	CSU
First downs	30	25
Total yards	606	600
Rushing yards	225	155
Passing yards	381	445
Turnovers	0	3
Time of possession	36:05	23:55

Team	Category	Player	Statistics
Idaho	Passing	Matt Linehan	21/31, 381 yards, 4 TD
Idaho	Rushing	Isaiah Saunders	33 rushes, 147 yards, 3 TD
Idaho	Receiving	Deon Watson	5 receptions, 140 yards, TD
Colorado State	Passing	Nick Stevens	21/36, 445 yards, 5 TD, 2 INT
Colorado State	Rushing	Dalyn Dawkins	16 rushes, 118 yards, TD
Colorado State	Receiving	Bisi Johnson	7 receptions, 265 yards, 2 TD

After a scoreless first quarter, the Vandals would jump out to a 41–14 lead heading into the fourth quarter. Both offenses would go off in the final quarter, scoring a combined 56 points for a final score of 61–50 in favor of Idaho, breaking the record for the most points scored in the Famous Idaho Potato Bowl, with the previous record being set in 2009, which also featured the Vandals. The two teams scored a combined 84 points in the second half, breaking the bowl record for most points scored in a half, with the previous record being 76 in the first half of the 2015 Independence Bowl. Idaho quarterback Matt Linehan would be named the game's MVP; Linehan finished the game throwing for 381 yards and 4 touchdowns and had one rushing touchdown.
