= 2016 Famous Idaho Potato Bowl =

- 20th Famous Idaho Potato Bowl
| Idaho Vandals | Colorado State Rams |
| (8–4) | (7–5) |
| Sun Belt | Mountain West |
| 61 | 50 |
| Head coach: Paul Petrino | Head coach: Mike Bobo |
| | 1 | 2 | 3 | 4 | Total |
|---|---|---|---|---|---|
| Idaho | 0 | 20 | 21 | 20 | 61 |
| Colorado State | 0 | 7 | 7 | 36 | 50 |
- Date: December 22, 2016
- Season: 2016
- Stadium: Albertsons Stadium
- Location: Boise, Idaho
- MVP: Matt Linehan; Quarterback, Idaho
- Favorite: Colorado State by 14
- Referee: Tracy Jones (AAC)
- Attendance: 24,975
- Payout: US$325,000

United States TV coverage
- Network: ESPN
- Announcers: Dave Neal (play-by-play); Matt Stinchcomb (analyst); Olivia Harlan (sideline); Paul Loeffler, Marty Cesario (ESPN Radio)

The 2016 Famous Idaho Potato Bowl was a post-season American college football bowl game played on December 22, 2016, at Albertsons Stadium in Boise, Idaho. The 20th annual edition of the Famous Idaho Potato Bowl, the game featured the Idaho Vandals of the Sun Belt Conference and the Colorado State Rams of the Mountain West Conference. It was one of the 2016–17 bowl games that concluded the 2016 FBS football season. The game's title sponsor was the Idaho Potato Commission. The game began at 5:05 p.m. MST and was broadcast on ESPN College Football. Idaho defeated Colorado State by a score of 61–50.

Both teams entered with similar records: Idaho finished the regular season with an 8–4 mark, their first winning season under head coach Paul Petrino, while Colorado State came into the contest with a record of 7–5. Idaho made their third appearance in the game, and their third overall bowl game appearance, with their previous two in the Humanitarian Bowl, this game's predecessor. Colorado State made their 16th bowl game appearance, and their first in the Famous Idaho Potato Bowl. Despite their lesser record, Colorado State entered the game as fourteen-point favorites, and were generally expected to win the contest behind the passing attack of Nick Stevens and their rushing game, led by Dalyn Dawkins.

The game started slowly, as turnovers and punts doomed the first quarter to a scoreless end. The first score of the game came 25 seconds into the second quarter, on a long pass from Stevens to Bisi Johnson, who would ultimately finish the game having broken the record for receiving yards in a bowl game. Idaho's offense responded to lead 20–7 at halftime, with Isaiah Saunders scoring twice on the ground. The second half of the game was the highest scoring half in bowl game history, as the teams combined to score 84 points during the third and fourth quarters. Idaho's lead grew to 34 on three different occasions, and the first drive of the fourth quarter not to end in a touchdown did not occur until three minutes before the end of the game. Trailing by 33 halfway through the final quarter, Colorado State ended the game on a streak of 22 unanswered points to cut the final margin of victory to 11.

== Team selection ==
The game normally featured teams from the Mountain West Conference (MWC) and the Mid-American Conference (MAC) based on its conference tie-ins. However, the selection committee decided to invite the in-state Idaho Vandals of the Sun Belt Conference instead of a team from the MAC. This was Idaho's third bowl appearance, as they had previously appeared in, and won, the 1998 and 2009 editions of the Humanitarian Bowl, a predecessor of the Famous Idaho Potato Bowl. In addition, the Colorado State Rams made their fourth consecutive, and 16th overall, bowl game appearance, and their first in the Famous Idaho Potato Bowl.

This was the eighth meeting between the schools, with Colorado State leading the all-time series 4–3. The most recent meeting was six years earlier in 2010 on September 25; the Rams won in Fort Collins with a game-ending field goal, 36–34. Idaho won the year before in Moscow, also by two points.

=== Idaho Vandals ===
Coming off of a 4–8 season, fourth-year head coach Paul Petrino looked to lead the Vandals to bowl eligibility for the first time since 2009. They started the season 2–3, but bounced back and won 6 of their last 7 to finish the regular season 8–4. The Vandals were 2–0 in bowl games in school history, with both of their previous bowl games being played in Boise – they defeated Southern Miss in the 1998 Humanitarian Bowl and Bowling Green in the 2009 Humanitarian Bowl.

The game and Idaho's 2016 season took place against the backdrop of upcoming major change to the Vandals football program. On March 1, 2016, the Sun Belt Conference announced that its football membership agreements with Idaho and New Mexico State would not be renewed once they expired after the 2017 season. Idaho responded by announcing on April 28 that the football program would downgrade from the top-level FBS to FCS effective with the 2018 season and rejoin the Big Sky Conference, already home to the university's other sports. During the announcement, university president Chuck Staben said, "Our relevance will be complemented by our football program, not defined by it." Idaho would become the first school ever to voluntarily drop from FBS to FCS.

Yahoo! Sports columnist Pat Forde, in his preview of the 2016–17 bowl season, alluded to Idaho's future FCS move, saying, "This is Idaho’s biggest game in years – its first bowl game since 2009, and it’s a virtual home game, and it might be the Vandals’ last FBS hurrah with a drop to FCS scheduled for 2018."

=== Colorado State Rams ===
Coming off of a 7–6 season that included a bowl loss to Nevada, second-year head coach Mike Bobo led the Rams to a second straight 7–5 regular season that included a 2–1 start and a 2–1 finish. This was the sixteenth bowl game appearance in school history, with the Rams having compiled a 6–9 bowl record to date. Their last bowl win came in the 2013 New Mexico Bowl over Washington State, and they had gone 0–2 in bowl games since.

== Game summary ==
=== First half ===
With a game time temperature of 20 °F (−7 °C), the game began at 5:05 p.m. MST (7:05 p.m. EST) and was broadcast by ESPN. Idaho kicked off to start the game and Rams returner Jake Schlager opened the game with a 46-yard return. After an unsportsmanlike conduct penalty, the Rams started their first drive at their own 40-yard-line. They drove the ball down to the Idaho 21-yard-line, where they failed to convert a 4th & 1. Idaho's first drive started there, but they stalled and were forced to punt after a three-and-out, giving Colorado State possession of the ball on their own 42-yard-line. The Rams' second drive was cut short after two plays when quarterback Nick Stevens's pass was intercepted over the middle by Jayshawn Jordan at the Idaho 41-yard-line. The Vandals, however, were unable to capitalize, and punted back to Colorado State. The punt was downed at the Colorado State 40-yard-line. The teams would trade punts for the remainder of the quarter, which ended scoreless.

Colorado State started the second quarter with possession of the ball on their own 16-yard-line and drove to their own 48, where they completed a 52-yard touchdown pass for the first points of the game. On Idaho's ensuing drive, they jumpstarted their offense with their first big play of the game, a 36-yard pass down to the Rams' 2-yard-line; they scored on the next play to pull within one point after the extra point was missed. Following a touchback, Colorado State resumed possession at their own 25-yard-line, but were forced to punt after a penalty and two incompletions. Idaho regained possession at their own 38-yard-line, and soon after completed another long pass, this one for 33 yards. They scored on the next play by virtue of a 26-yard rush from running back Isaiah Saunders, his second touchdown of the game. Colorado State returned the ensuing kickoff to the 27-yard-line. After gaining one first down, the Rams punted again and Idaho started their seventh drive on their own 15. This drive featured six first downs (two of which were fourth down conversions) and resulted in Idaho scoring a touchdown and increasing their lead to 13 points. Idaho squibbed the kickoff, giving Colorado State the ball on their own 17-yard-line with 14 seconds remaining. They were able to run one play before the clock expired, with Idaho leading 20–7 at halftime.

=== Second half ===
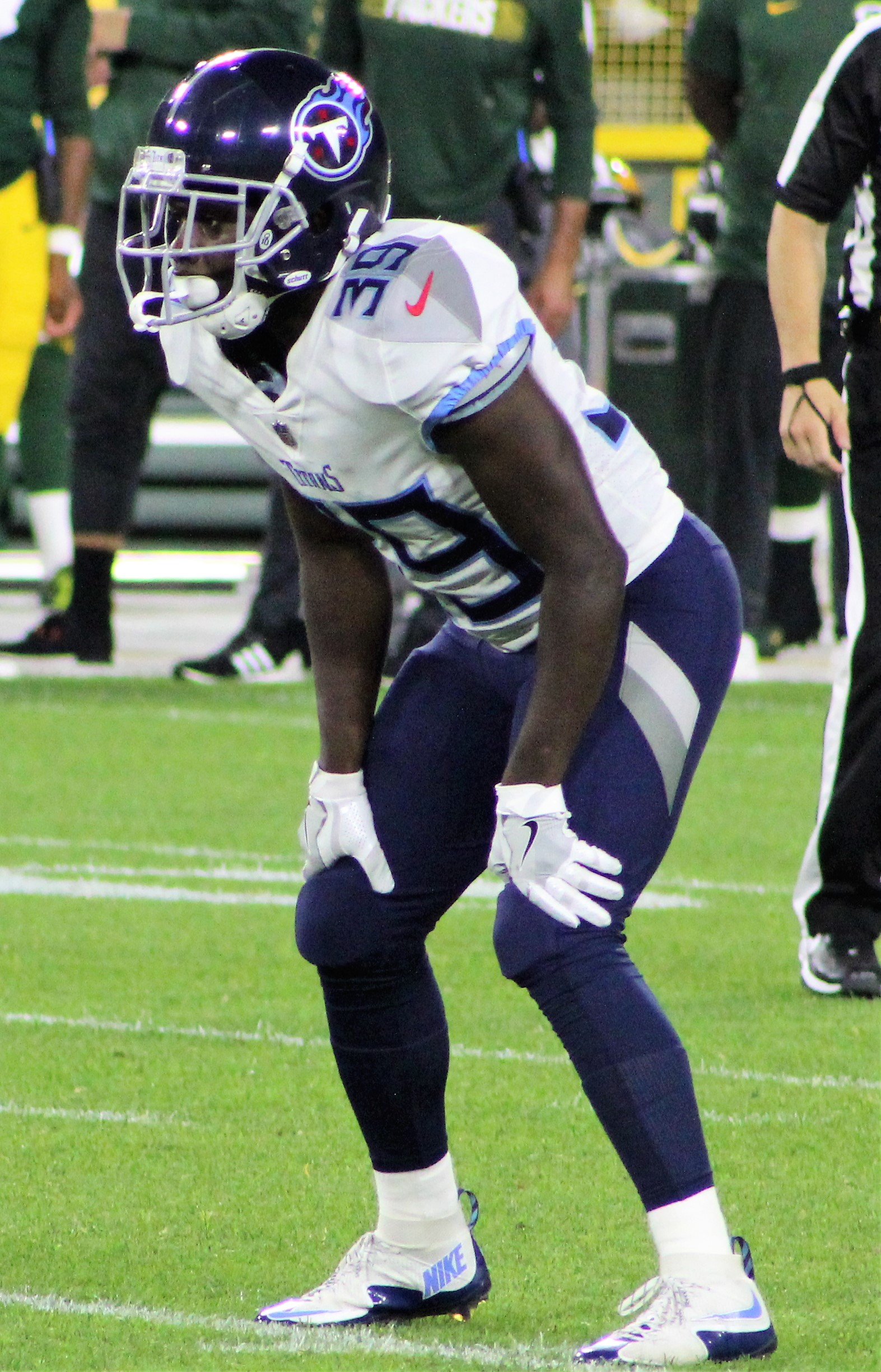
Dalyn Dawkins with the Tennessee Titans in 2018

Idaho received the kickoff to begin the second half and started their drive on their 31-yard-line. Idaho's offense began the half effectively, driving down the field and scoring their fourth touchdown in their last four drives. Despite converting on a third down, Colorado State's first drive of the third quarter ended in a punt, which was downed on the 21-yard-line. Idaho's next drive was capped by yet another touchdown, which increased their lead to 27. The Rams started their second drive of the half on their own 39-yard-line; two incompletions and a sack later, Colorado State punted and Idaho took over on the 9-yard-line. The Vandals would be forced to punt on this drive, but the punt was muffed and Idaho recovered the ball on the CSU 14-yard-line. It took the Vandals just three more plays to score, extending their lead to 34 with a touchdown. The Rams' next possession saw back-to-back deep passes and a subsequent defensive penalty advance the ball to the Idaho 7-yard-line, and two plays later the Rams found the end zone and snapped Idaho's streak of 41 unanswered points. The quarter ended with Idaho leading 41–14.

Idaho's offense responded quickly, as they scored within the first two minutes of the fourth quarter to extend their lead to 34, though this was countered with a Colorado State touchdown a few plays later. Idaho reestablished their 34-point lead on their next drive, leaving 9 minutes and 27 seconds left in the game. Only 21 seconds later, the Rams scored again; a 60-yard touchdown pass made the score 55–28 with 9:06 left. Colorado State's onside kick was unsuccessful, and Idaho responded with another touchdown: an Isaiah Saunders 12-yard rush to make it 61–28 after the extra point was missed. Colorado State scored another touchdown on their next drive, but again, their onside kick was unsuccessful. The first drive of the fourth quarter not to result in a touchdown came with 3:12 remaining when Idaho went three-and-out and was forced to punt back to Colorado State, who took over on their own 16-yard-line. With 2:42 to play, Nick Stevens threw a long pass which was intercepted at the Idaho 20-yard-line by D.J. Hampton. Idaho went three-and-out and punted back to the Rams, whose next drive started on the 43-yard-line and resulted in a 22-yard touchdown rush by Dalyn Dawkins, making the score 61–42. With just over a minute left in the game, Colorado State recovered their onside kick at their own 46-yard-line and gained 39 yards on the first play of that possession. The second play got them inside the 5-yard-line and, two plays later, they scored their fifth touchdown of the quarter on a 1-yard rush by Izzy Matthews. The two-point conversion was good on a pass from Stevens to Johnson. The Rams' next onside kick was recovered by Idaho, however, dashing any hopes of a comeback. The contest finished with Idaho defeating Colorado State, 61–50.

=== Scoring summary ===
Scoring summary

| Quarter | Time | Drive | | | Team | Scoring information | Score | |
| Quarter | Time | Plays | Yards | TOP | Team | Scoring information | Idaho | Colo St. |
|---|---|---|---|---|---|---|---|---|
| 2 | 14:35 | 6 | 84 | 1:28 | Colo St. | Bisi Johnson 52-yard touchdown reception from Nick Stevens, Wyatt Bryan kick good | 0 | 7 |
| 2 | 12:03 | 6 | 65 | 2:32 | Idaho | Isaiah Saunders 2-yard touchdown run, Austin Rehkow kick no good (miss right) | 6 | 7 |
| 2 | 9:59 | 3 | 62 | 0:56 | Idaho | Isaiah Saunders 26-yard touchdown run, Austin Rehkow kick good | 13 | 7 |
| 2 | 0:24 | 18 | 85 | 6:44 | Idaho | Jacob Sannon 6-yard touchdown reception from Matt Linehan, Austin Rehkow kick good | 20 | 7 |
| 3 | 11:12 | 9 | 69 | 3:48 | Idaho | Matt Linehan 7-yard touchdown run, Austin Rehkow kick good | 27 | 7 |
| 3 | 8:13 | 1 | 74 | 0:18 | Idaho | Deon Watson 74-yard touchdown reception from Matt Linehan, Austin Rehkow kick good | 34 | 7 |
| 3 | 3:16 | 3 | 14 | 0:53 | Idaho | Jacob Sannon 16-yard touchdown reception from Matt Linehan, Austin Rehkow kick good | 41 | 7 |
| 3 | 1:43 | 5 | 91 | 1:33 | Colo St. | Michael Gallup 12-yard touchdown reception from Nick Stevens, Wyatt Bryan kick good | 41 | 14 |
| 4 | 12:56 | 7 | 69 | 3:47 | Idaho | Aaron Duckworth 5-yard touchdown run, Austin Rehkow kick good | 48 | 14 |
| 4 | 12:21 | 2 | 86 | 0:35 | Colo St. | Bisi Johnson 72-yard touchdown reception from Nick Stevens, Wyatt Bryan kick good | 48 | 21 |
| 4 | 9:27 | 5 | 76 | 2:54 | Idaho | Jordan Frysinger 54-yard touchdown reception from Matt Linehan, Austin Rehkow kick good | 55 | 21 |
| 4 | 9:06 | 1 | 60 | 0:21 | Colo St. | Michael Gallup 60-yard touchdown reception from Nick Stevens, Wyatt Bryan kick good | 55 | 28 |
| 4 | 7:40 | 3 | 24 | 1:26 | Idaho | Isaiah Saunders 12-yard touchdown run, Austin Rehkow kick no good (miss left) | 61 | 28 |
| 4 | 5:29 | 9 | 64 | 2:11 | Colo St. | Michael Gallup 3-yard touchdown reception from Nick Stevens, Wyatt Bryan kick good | 61 | 35 |
| 4 | 1:07 | 4 | 57 | 1:09 | Colo St. | Dalyn Dawkins 22-yard touchdown run, Wyatt Bryan kick good | 61 | 42 |
| 4 | 0:29 | 3 | 54 | 0:38 | Colo St. | Izzy Matthews 1-yard touchdown run, 2-point pass good | 61 | 50 |
| "TOP" = time of possession. For other American football terms, see Glossary of American football. | | | | | | | 61 | 50 |

== Statistics ==
The game's statistics reflected the high-powered offensive performances put on by both teams, with each starting quarterback eclipsing 350 yards of passing. Idaho's Matt Linehan completed 21 of his 31 passes for 381 yards and 4 touchdowns, while Colorado State's Nick Stevens completed 21 of his 36 passes for 445 yards and 5 touchdowns, but threw 2 interceptions to Linehan's none. Colorado State's Bisi Johnson finished as the game's leading receiver, as he caught 7 passes for a net gain of 265 yards and 2 touchdowns, while Deon Watson was the Vandals' leading receiver, finishing the game with 5 receptions for 140 yards and a touchdown. Both running backs also passed the 100-yard mark during the game – Isaiah Saunders rushed for 147 yards on 33 carries and scored 3 touchdowns for the Vandals while Dalyn Dawkins carried the ball 16 times for the Rams, gaining 118 yards and scoring 1 touchdown.

Idaho finished the game with 30 first downs, to Colorado State's 25. The Vandals were also more efficient on third down conversions, going 7 for 16 to the Rams' 4 for 11. Colorado State out-passed Idaho, 445 yards to 381, but Idaho finished with 225 rushing yards to Colorado State's 155. Idaho held possession of the ball for 36 minutes, compared to nearly 24 minutes for Colorado State.

The game set multiple offensive and scoring records; notably, it broke the record for the highest-scoring Idaho Potato Bowl, previously set in 2009 by Idaho and Bowling Green. Idaho and Colorado State's 84 combined points in the second half broke the record for points in a half in any bowl game, previously 76 in the first half of the 2015 Independence Bowl. Each team's quarterback, Matt Linehan and Nick Stevens, tied the bowl record for touchdowns accounted for, with five, and Colorado State wide receiver Bisi Johnson set the bowl record with his 265 receiving yards.

== Aftermath ==
With their victory, Idaho became the 2016 Famous Idaho Potato Bowl champions and improved their bowl record to 3–0. They finished the 2016 season with a 9–4 record, which was Idaho's only winning season under head coach Paul Petrino, who held the job from 2013 to 2021. Idaho did not make a bowl game after finishing the 2017 season with a 4–8 record, and they officially dropped to the FCS level on July 1, 2018, joining the Big Sky Conference in time for the 2018 season.

In a postgame interview for ESPN Radio, quarterback Matt Linehan was strongly critical of University of Idaho president Chuck Staben and his decision to drop the football program to FCS level, saying,

We belong in FBS, period. That's what I believe, that's what everyone believes. We know we can compete, we belong here. No matter what anyone thinks, even our tone-deaf president. Maybe he doesn't think we belong here, but I think we belong here.

Following the loss, Colorado State finished the season with a record of 7–6. The Rams' record in bowl games fell to 6–10; this game was the fourth in a series of five consecutive bowl appearances for Colorado State going back to 2013. The next season, Colorado State repeated with a 7–5 regular season and earned a berth in the 2017 New Mexico Bowl, which they lost.
