= 2017 New Mexico Bowl =

American college football game

2017 Gildan New Mexico Bowl
- 12th New Mexico Bowl
Marshall Thundering Herd	Colorado State Rams
(7–5)	(7–5)
C-USA	Mountain West
31	28
Head coach: Doc Holliday	Head coach: Mike Bobo
	1	2	3	4	Total
Marshall	0	21	10	0	31
Colorado State	0	14	0	14	28
- Date: December 16, 2017
- Season: 2017
- Stadium: Dreamstyle Stadium
- Location: Albuquerque, New Mexico
- MVP: Offense: Marshall WR Tyre Brady; Defense: Marshall LB Channing Hames
- Favorite: Colorado State by 3
- Referee: Luke Richmond (MAC)
- Attendance: 26,087
- Payout: US$1,050,000

United States TV coverage
- Network: ESPN
- Announcers: Anish Shroff, Ahmad Brooks, Roddy Jones

The 2017 New Mexico Bowl was a postseason college football bowl game played at Dreamstyle Stadium in Albuquerque, New Mexico on December 16, 2017. The game was the 12th edition of the New Mexico Bowl and featured the Marshall Thundering Herd of Conference USA and the Colorado State Rams of the Mountain West Conference. Sponsored by clothing company Gildan, the game was officially known as the 2017 Gildan New Mexico Bowl.

== Teams ==
This game featured the Marshall Thundering Herd of Conference USA against the Colorado State Rams of the Mountain West Conference in their first meeting against each other.

=== Marshall Thundering Herd ===
The Marshall Thundering Herd finished the 2017 regular season with a 7–5 (4–4 C-USA) record. The game was the team's first appearance in the New Mexico Bowl and fourteenth overall. This was Marshall's first bowl game against a team from the Mountain West Conference since the 1999 Motor City Bowl win over BYU.

=== Colorado State Rams ===
The Colorado State Rams finished the 2017 regular season with a 7–5 (5–3 MW) record. The game was the team's third appearance in the New Mexico Bowl and seventeenth overall. The Rams had previously played in the 2013 game, winning against Washington State.

== Game summary ==
=== Scoring summary ===
Scoring summary

Quarter	Time	Drive			Team	Scoring information	Score	
Quarter	Time	Plays	Yards	TOP	Team	Scoring information	Marshall	Colo. St.
2	14:29	1	76	0:21	Marshall	Tyre Brady 76-yard touchdown reception from Chase Litton, Kaare Vedvik kick good	7	0
2	8:17	15	75	6:12	Colo. St.	Detrich Clark 5-yard touchdown reception from Nick Stevens, Wyatt Bryan kick good	7	7
2	6:07	6	75	2:10	Marshall	Ryan Yurachek 15-yard touchdown reception from Litton, Vedvik kick good	14	7
2	4:41	4	75	1:26	Colo. St.	Nick Stevens 9-yard touchdown run, Bryan kick good	14	14
2	3:55	2	75	0:46	Marshall	Keion Davis 68-yard touchdown run, Vedvik kick good	21	14
3	12:12	1	90	0:14	Marshall	Tyler King 90-yard touchdown run, Vedvik kick good	28	14
3	4:10	14	72	6:06	Marshall	21-yard field goal by Kaare Vedvik	31	14
4	12:55	5	79	1:21	Colo. St.	Detrich Clark 24-yard touchdown reception from Stevens, Bryan kick good	31	21
4	6:37	8	85	3:11	Colo. St.	Nick Stevens 1-yard touchdown run, Bryan kick good	31	28
"TOP" = time of possession. For other American football terms, see Glossary of American football.							31	28

=== Statistics ===
Statistics	Marshall	Colo. St.
First downs	18	26
Third down efficiency	5-14	9–19
Rushes–yards	33-239	31–70
Passing yards	262	320
Passing: Comp–Att–Int	17-32-2	25–52–0
Time of possession	27:56	32:04

Team	Category	Player	Statistics
Marshall	Passing	Chase Litton	17/32, 262 yds, 2 TD, 2 INT
Marshall	Rushing	Keion Davis	18 car, 141 yds, 1 TD
Marshall	Receiving	Tyre Brady	6 rec, 165 yds, 1 TD
Colo. St.	Passing	Nick Stevens	25/52, 320 yds, 2 TD
Colo. St.	Rushing	Dalyn Dawkins	10 car, 50 yds
Colo. St.	Receiving	Bisi Johnson	6 rec, 119 yds
