= Mike Bobo =

American football player and coach (born 1974)

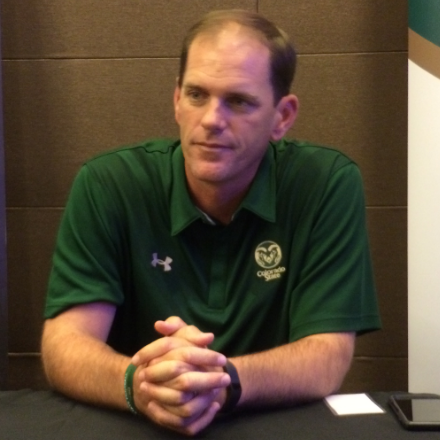
- Bobo with Colorado State in 2016

Current position
- Title: Offensive coordinator, quarterbacks coach
- Team: Georgia
- Conference: SEC

Biographical details
- Born: April 9, 1974 (age 52); Augusta, Georgia, U.S.

Playing career
- 1993–1997: Georgia
- Position: Quarterback

Coaching career (HC unless noted)
- 1999: Georgia (GA)
- 2000: Jacksonville State (QB)
- 2001–2006: Georgia (QB)
- 2007–2014: Georgia (OC/QB)
- 2015–2019: Colorado State
- 2020: South Carolina (OC/QB)
- 2020: South Carolina (interim HC/OC)
- 2021: Auburn (OC/QB)
- 2022: Georgia (offensive analyst)
- 2023–present: Georgia (OC/QB)

Administrative career (AD unless noted)
- 1998: Georgia (staff)

Head coaching record
- Overall: 28–38
- Bowls: 0–3

Robert Michael Bobo (born April 9, 1974) is an American college football coach who is currently the offensive coordinator and quarterbacks coach at the University of Georgia, his alma mater. He was the head coach at Colorado State from 2015 to 2019. Bobo is known for his pro-style type offensive schemes which cater to the ability to control clock and create long methodical drives.

== Playing career ==
Bobo played for the Thomasville High School Bulldogs in Thomasville, Georgia before playing college football at the University of Georgia.

As a senior in 1997, he threw for 2,751 yards, going 199/306 on passing attempts with 19 touchdowns and eight interceptions. He set various passing records during his career, including career passer rating.

== Coaching career ==
=== Georgia ===
Bobo remained at Georgia as a member of the football administrative staff under Jim Donnan. After one year as a graduate assistant, he went to Jacksonville State as quarterbacks coach.

A year later, he returned to Georgia as quarterbacks coach under newly hired Mark Richt. He was promoted to offensive coordinator in 2007. He is widely known for his knack in grooming successful quarterbacks like Matthew Stafford, Aaron Murray, and David Greene. In 2012, Bobo was a finalist for the Broyles Award, given annually to the nation's top college football assistant coach.

=== Colorado State ===
On December 23, 2014, Bobo took the head coaching job at Colorado State University, that was previously held by Jim McElwain who left for the head coaching vacancy at the University of Florida. Coming off McElwain's 10-3 season, Bobo's first three teams went 7–6, with all losing in low-level bowl games. In 2017, they began play in newly built Canvas Stadium.

The 2018 season started disastrously, as Colorado State lost badly to Hawaii in their home opener, Colorado, Florida, and FCS Illinois State. Their lone win during that stretch came with a come-from-behind victory at home against Arkansas. The Rams finished a dismal 3-9, their worst record since the Steve Fairchild era.

The 2019 season showed little improvement, as the Rams finished 4–8, including losing to rivals Colorado, Air Force, and Wyoming for the 4th consecutive year. Calls for Bobo's firing gained steam throughout the season. Just over 12,000 people attended the final home game against Boise State, one of the Rams' worst home crowds since before Sonny Lubick's arrival. Bobo and CSU mutually agreed to part ways just days later.

=== South Carolina ===
Following his dismissal from Colorado State, Bobo was named the offensive coordinator and quarterbacks coach for South Carolina on December 10, 2019. South Carolina named him interim head coach on November 15, 2020, after firing Will Muschamp. Bobo was retained as offensive coordinator by newly hired Gamecocks head coach Shane Beamer for the 2021 season, but soon left to become the offensive coordinator on Bryan Harsin's inaugural Auburn staff.

=== Auburn ===
Bobo joined the Auburn football staff as the offensive coordinator and quarterbacks coach for the 2021 football season. He was fired on November 29, 2021, following a four overtime loss to Alabama.

=== Return to Georgia ===
On January 28, 2022, Bobo was hired by Georgia as an offensive analyst under his former college teammate, Kirby Smart. Following Todd Monken leaving to take the vacant offensive coordinator position for the NFL's Baltimore Ravens on February 14, 2023, Bobo was promoted to the position of offensive coordinator for the Bulldogs. He was part of the coaching staff on the Georgia team that defeated TCU in the National Championship.

== Head coaching record ==
| Year | Team | Overall | Conference | Standing | Bowl/playoffs |
|---|---|---|---|---|---|
Colorado State Rams (Mountain West Conference) (2015–2019)
| 2015 | Colorado State | 7–6 | 5–3 | T–2nd (Mountain) | L Arizona |
| 2016 | Colorado State | 7–6 | 5–3 | T–4th (Mountain) | L Famous Idaho Potato |
| 2017 | Colorado State | 7–6 | 5–3 | T–2nd (Mountain) | L New Mexico |
| 2018 | Colorado State | 3–9 | 2–6 | 5th (Mountain) | |
| 2019 | Colorado State | 4–8 | 3–5 | 5th (Mountain) | |
| Colorado State: | | 28–35 | 20–20 | | |
South Carolina Gamecocks (Southeastern Conference) (2020)
| 2020 | South Carolina | 0–3 (Note: Will Muschamp was fired with three games remaining; Bobo coached the remainder of the season.) | 0–3 | 6th (Eastern) | Gasparilla (Note: The Gasparilla Bowl was cancelled due to COVID-19 issues and ruled a no contest.) |
| South Carolina: | | 0–3 | 0–3 | | |
| Total: | | 28–38 | | | |
