= Paul Petrino =

American football player and coach (born 1967)

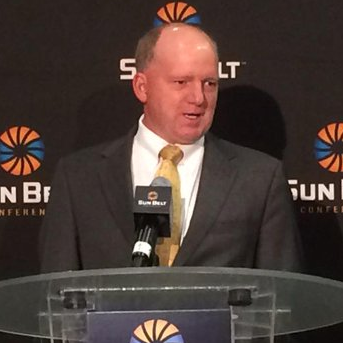
- At Sun Belt Media Day in 2015

Current position
- Title: Senior Offensive Assistant
- Team: Louisville
- Conference: ACC

Biographical details
- Born: May 25, 1967 (age 59); Butte, Montana, U.S.

Playing career
- 1985–1988: Carroll (MT)
- Position: Quarterback

Coaching career (HC unless noted)
- 1990–1991: Carroll (MT) (OC/QB)
- 1992–1994: Idaho (ST/RB/WR)
- 1995–1997: Utah State (ST/WR)
- 1998–1999: Louisville (WR)
- 2000–2002: Southern Miss (QB)
- 2003–2006: Louisville (OC/WR)
- 2007: Atlanta Falcons (WR)
- 2008–2009: Arkansas (OC/WR)
- 2010–2011: Illinois (OC/WR)
- 2012: Arkansas (OC/QB)
- 2013–2021: Idaho
- 2022–2023: Central Michigan (OC/QB)
- 2024: South Alabama (WR)
- 2025: South Alabama (OC/QB)
- 2026–present: Louisville (OA)

Head coaching record
- Overall: 34–66
- Bowls: 1–0

Accomplishments and honors

Awards
- Sun Belt Coach of the Year (2016)

Paul Vincent Petrino (born May 25, 1967) is an American college football coach. He is currently a senior offensive assistant coach at Louisville. He was previously the head coach at the University of Idaho in Moscow, with an overall record of 34–66 (.340) over nine seasons.

== Early life ==
Born in Butte, Montana, Petrino grew up in Helena and graduated from its Capital High School. Recruited by the University of Montana in Missoula, Petrino stayed in Helena and attended Carroll College. He played quarterback for the Fighting Saints, where his father, Bob Petrino Sr., was the head coach from 1971 to 1998. Both are members of Carroll's athletic hall of fame.

== Coaching career ==
Petrino began his coaching career as an assistant coach at Carroll shortly after graduation. He worked as an assistant coach, wide receiver coach, and offensive coordinator at several other schools in the next 20 years, including a short stint with the Atlanta Falcons of the National Football League (NFL) in 2007. In 2006, while serving as offensive coordinator and wide receivers coach at Louisville, Petrino was a finalist for the Broyles Award, given annually to the nation's top college football assistant coach.

=== Idaho ===
In December 2012, Petrino became the head coach at Idaho, where he had worked in the early 1990s under John L. Smith. After the announcement, Arkansas athletic director Jeff Long praised Petrino, saying he would have named Petrino the interim Arkansas head coach if not for his brother Bobby's resignation after a scandal. Following the 2016 season, Petrino was named the Sun Belt Coach of the Year after improving the Vandals from 4–8 the previous season to 8–4. The season was capped with a ninth win, in the Famous Idaho Potato Bowl in Boise. After more than two decades back in the Football Bowl Subdivision (FBS), Idaho returned to the Big Sky Conference in FCS in 2018.

Petrino's record at Idaho was 34–66 (.340), the nine seasons and 66 losses are the most by a head coach in program history. In 2019, he passed Skip Stahley, 22–51–1 (.304) in eight seasons (1954–61). Third on that list is Robb Akey, 20–50 (.286) in six seasons (2007–12), and did not coach the final four games of 2012, all losses; fourth is Tom Cable, 11–35 (.239) in four seasons (2000–03).

=== Later career ===
Following his firing in Idaho after the 2021 season, Petrino was briefly on the staff at South Alabama as an offensive analyst, then joined Jim McElwain's staff at Central Michigan as the offensive coordinator. In February 2024, he became the wide receivers coach at South Alabama under new head coach Major Applewhite. On January 7, 2025, Petrino was promoted as the offensive coordinator and quarterbacks coach.

== Personal life ==
Petrino is the younger brother, by six years, of North Carolina offensive coordinator Bobby Petrino; both were quarterbacks at Carroll. When Paul was a player, Bobby was the offensive coordinator. The brothers have worked together on coaching teams such as Louisville, the Atlanta Falcons, and Arkansas. His son, Mason Petrino, played quarterback for him at Idaho, and started in games from 2017 to 2019.

== Head coaching record ==
Year	Team	Overall	Conference	Standing	Bowl/playoffs
Idaho Vandals (FBS independent) (2013)
2013	Idaho	1–11			
Idaho Vandals (Sun Belt Conference) (2014–2017)
2014	Idaho	1–10	1–7	T–9th	
2015	Idaho	4–8	3–5	T–5th	
2016	Idaho	9–4	6–2	T–3rd	W Famous Idaho Potato
2017	Idaho	4–8	3–5	T–8th	
Idaho Vandals (Big Sky Conference) (2018–2021)
2018	Idaho	4–7	3–5	T–9th	
2019	Idaho	5–7	3–5	T–7th	
2020–21	Idaho	2–4	2–4	T–5th	
2021	Idaho	4–7	3–5	9th	
Idaho:		34–66	24–38		
Total:		34–66			
