= Salesian High School (Los Angeles) =

Catholic High School in Los Angeles

Bishop Mora Salesian High School
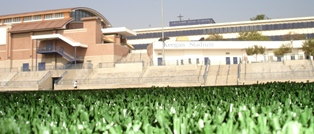
- Field View

Location
- 960 South Soto Street; Boyle Heights, Los Angeles, California 90023; United States; 34.032762°N 118.216253°W

Information
- Type: Private, All-Boys
- Motto: To Love, Teach & Inspire
- Religious affiliations: Roman Catholic; Salesians of Don Bosco
- Patron saint: Don Bosco
- Established: September 15, 1958; 67 years ago
- Status: Open
- Oversight: Archdiocese of Los Angeles
- CEEB code: 051554
- President: Alex Chacon
- Director: Fr. Jim Nieblas, SDB
- Principal: Mark Johnson
- Faculty: 35
- Grades: 9-12
- Gender: Male
- Enrollment: 420 (2018-2019)
- Average class size: 25
- Student to teacher ratio: 16:1
- Colors: Columbia Blue and Black
- Athletics conference: CIF Southern Section; Camino Real League
- Sports: Baseball, Basketball, Volleyball, Football, Soccer, Cross Country, Golf, Track & Field
- Nickname: Mustangs
- Accreditation: Western Association of Schools and Colleges through 2016.
- Publication: The SPIRIT
- Yearbook: Etalon
- Tuition: $8,900
- Website: www.mustangsla.org

Bishop Mora Salesian High School ("Salesian High School") is an all-boys Roman Catholic high school founded in 1958 and operated by the Archdiocese of Los Angeles in the community of Boyle Heights in Los Angeles, California. It is named after Francisco Mora y Borrell, Bishop of the former Monterey-Los Angeles Diocese. The high school is associated with the religious order, the Salesians of Don Bosco.

== Early history ==
The Archdiocese of Los Angeles, through the insistence of Cardinal James Francis McIntyre, entrusted Bishop Mora Salesian High School to the care and spirit of the Salesians of Don Bosco as a way of building up the faith community of Boyle Heights, East Los Angeles, and surrounding communities.

Bishop Mora Salesian High School opened in 1958 as an archdiocesan school operated by the Salesians of Don Bosco. The school offered four distinct academic programs: college preparatory, business, general education, and shop. Throughout the 1960s and early 1970s, Salesian was known for its strong shop programs in printing, drafting, woodworking, and electronics. During these years, the student body reflected the ethnic diversity of the neighborhood and was composed of Latinos, African-Americans, Japanese-Americans, Italian-Americans and Irish-Americans. As surrounding communities became increasingly Latino, so did the ethnic make-up of the school. Today, the student body is 96% Latino and 98% Catholic.

The early 1970s saw a transformation of the school's curricular program. Salesian High School discontinued the shop and business programs and redirected resources into the college preparatory offerings. Enrollment reached an all-time high during the late 60s and early 70s; the student body reached nearly one thousand students during these years. The faculty was staffed with predominantly Salesian brothers and priests.

Catholic high schools throughout Los Angeles were decreasing both in enrollment and in religious personnel in the 1980s. Salesian High School was not immune, the enrollment during the mid 80's hovered around 300 students, and rumors of the school's closure began to spread. In 1988, the Salesians of Don Bosco responded to their declining number of religious in the Western Province by withdrawing from the administration of the school. During the following three years, the first two lay principals directed the school.

In 1992, the Provincial Chapter of the Salesians of Don Bosco reaffirmed its support of Salesian High School and reestablished an official relationship with the school and the Archdiocese of Los Angeles. The model affirms that Bishop Mora Salesian High School is a Salesian work that participates in the educational workshops, pastoral retreats, and scholarship programs of the Salesians of Don Bosco. By agreement with the Archdiocese of Los Angeles, the principal will be a lay person familiar with the Salesian Preventive System of Education. There will be a professed Salesian presence at the school and the spirit of St. John Bosco will continue at Salesian High School.

In that same year the school's first Advisory Board was formed in order to assist with strategic planning and the establishment of a development program. With a focus on raising funds for tuition assistance, Salesian experienced increases in enrollment. In 1998, the John and Dorothy Shea Foundation announced a $7 million grant to partially finance the construction of new academic, athletic, and multi-purpose facilities on the campus. Construction of these new facilities was completed in 2002 with Cardinal Roger Mahoney presiding at the dedication. The statue of St. John Bosco was placed once again in its place of honor, facing the entrance of the school building. Bishop Gabino Zavala led the prayers for the re-dedication of the statue, urging all to be active ministers of the Word of God.

== Athletics ==
=== Sports programs ===
- Baseball
- Basketball
- Cross Country
- Football
- Soccer
- Track & Field
- Volleyball
- Golf
- Cheerleading
- Esports (Multiple video games)

=== CIFSS Championships ===
- Cross Country – 2012, 2011, 1979, 1975, 1972
- Basketball – 2020
- Football – 2013
- Soccer – 2021, 2010, 2009, 2007, 2004, 1964
- Volleyball – 2009

=== CIF State Titles ===
- Soccer – 2021, 2011, 2010, 2008, 1964

=== New sports facilities ===
In fall of 2002, Salesian High School opened a new gym building with accompanying sports facilities, and a community sports field used both by the high school athletic teams as well as the local community.

== Current activity ==
The school operates on a college preparatory track. This system allows the school to serve all kinds of students while staying true to the vision of St. John Bosco. The school also hosts community events and provides local organizations with access to its campus facilities. Events include elementary school graduations, CYO tournaments, California Interscholastic Federation tournaments and many other functions that serve the Boyle Heights community.

== In the News ==
In 2014 the film Despues de Clases (After class) was filmed at Salesian High school. Many of the scenes were shot inside the building and in the upper main level of the campus.

== Notable alumni ==
- Carlos Alvarez – professional soccer player
- José Huizar – former Los Angeles City Council Member, 14th District
- Jermaine Kelly – NFL cornerback
- Deommodore Lenoir – NFL cornerback
- Keisean Nixon – NFL cornerback and return specialist
- Luis Silva – professional soccer player
