= Jermaine Kelly =

American football player (born 1995)

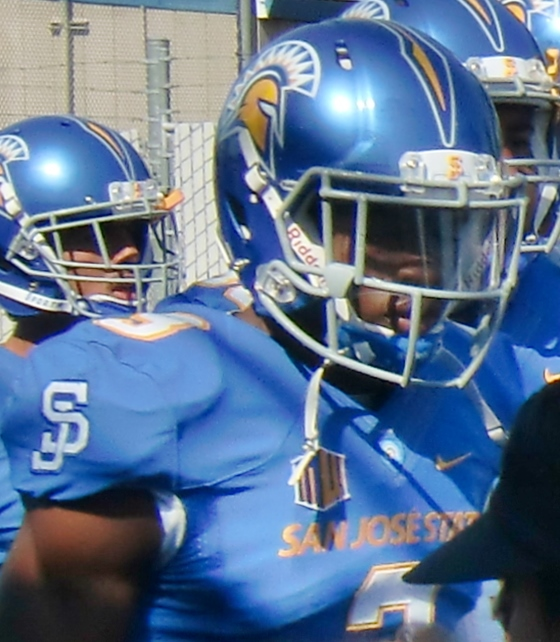
- Kelly with the San Jose State Spartans in 2016

No. 25
- Position: Cornerback

Personal information
- Born: February 26, 1995 (age 31); San Bernardino, California, U.S.
- Listed height: 6 ft 1 in (1.85 m)
- Listed weight: 195 lb (88 kg)

Career information
- High school: Salesian (Los Angeles, California)
- College: San Jose State
- NFL draft: 2018: 7th round, 222nd overall pick

Career history
- Houston Texans (2018); San Francisco 49ers (2019–2020)*; BC Lions (2021)*; Saskatchewan Roughriders (2022)*; Tampa Bay Bandits (2022); Memphis Showboats (2023)
- * Offseason or practice squad member only

Jermaine Elliott Kelly Jr. (born February 26, 1995) is an American former professional football cornerback. He played college football at San Jose State and Washington. Kelly had 26 tackles and one fumble recovery as a junior. In 2017, he recorded 53 tackles, one sack and one interception. He was selected by the Houston Texans in the seventh round of the 2018 NFL draft. Kelly was also a member of the San Francisco 49ers, BC Lions, Saskatchewan Roughriders, Tampa Bay Bandits and Memphis Showboats.

== Early life ==
Kelly was born in San Bernardino, California, and raised in Los Angeles. While playing high school football at Salesian High School, Kelly was an ESPN three-star recruit who received offers from Arizona, Arizona State, Boise State, Hawaii, Houston, Memphis, Minnesota, Northern Colorado, UCLA, USC, Utah, UTEP, and Washington. On January 7, 2013, Kelly committed to play for Washington.

== College career ==
After his second year at the University of Washington, Kelly transferred to San Jose State. Kelly transferred due to family obligations and a history of injuries that prevented him from playing to his full potential.

After redshirting the 2015 season, Kelly played for the San Jose State Spartans from 2016 to 2017. In 25 games, Kelly had 17 starts and made 79 tackles (one for loss), one interception, and 12 passes defended. His only interception was a 68-yard touchdown return in the September 23, 2017 game against Utah State, a 61–10 loss.

== Professional career ==
=== Houston Texans ===
Kelly was selected by the Houston Texans in the seventh round, 222nd overall, of the 2018 NFL draft. He was placed on injured reserve on September 3, 2018.

On August 16, 2019, Kelly was waived/injured by the Texans and placed on injured reserve. He was waived on August 24.

=== San Francisco 49ers ===
On December 11, 2019, Kelly was signed to the practice squad of the San Francisco 49ers. He re-signed with the 49ers on February 5, 2020. He was waived on July 28, 2020.

=== BC Lions ===
Kelly signed with the BC Lions of the Canadian Football League (CFL) on March 11, 2021. Kelly did not make an appearance for the Lions during the 2021 season.

=== Saskatchewan Roughriders ===
On April 28, 2022, Kelly signed with the CFL's Saskatchewan Roughriders. He was released on May 14, 2022.

=== Tampa Bay Bandits ===
Kelly signed with the Tampa Bay Bandits of the United States Football League on May 25, 2022.

=== Memphis Showboats ===
Kelly and all other Bandits players were all transferred to the Memphis Showboats after it was announced that the Bandits were taking a hiatus and that the Showboats were joining the league. He became a free agent after the 2023 season.
