= Nick Stevens (American football) =

American football player (born 1995)

Profile
- Position: Quarterback

Personal information
- Born: January 31, 1995 (age 31); Poway, California, U.S.
- Listed height: 6 ft 3 in (1.91 m)
- Listed weight: 215 lb (98 kg)

Career information
- High school: Vista Murrieta (Murrieta, California)
- College: Colorado State
- NFL draft: 2018: undrafted

Career history
- Denver Broncos (2018)*
- * Offseason or practice squad member only
- Stats at Pro Football Reference

Nick Stevens (born January 31, 1995) is an American former football quarterback. He played college football at Colorado State, where he was the starting quarterback from 2015 to 2017. He was signed as an undrafted free agent by the Denver Broncos in 2018.

== Career ==
Stevens attended Vista Murrieta High School in Murrieta, California and played college football at Colorado State University. After redshirting his first year at Colorado State in 2013, he played in five games as Garrett Grayson's backup in 2014, and made his official debut with the team in a win against the UC Davis Aggies. He also threw his first touchdown pass against the Tulsa Golden Hurricane.

=== 2015 ===
With Garrett Grayson leaving, he became the starter in 2015. He ran for his first rushing touchdown of his career against the Utah State Aggies. In a win over the UNLV Rebels, he completed a 69 yard touchdown pass to Steven Walker. He passed for 264 yards and a touchdown with 16 completions in a win against the New Mexico Lobos, securing bowl eligibility for the season. In the Arizona Bowl (which was the first edition of that bowl) against in-conference rivals Nevada Wolf Pack, he threw for 310 yards, and also had a rushing touchdown in the win.

=== 2016 ===
In the 2016 season, he was named honorable mention All-Mountain West by vote of coaches and media, and was also named to Phil Steele's All-MW third team. He played in 10 games and started 7 because he was benched in a loss against the Colorado Buffaloes, 44-7, as well as throwing for only 31 yards on 6 completions on 20 attempts, giving him a very low passer rating of 23 and a QBR of 1.8. He returned to start October 15th against Boise State, where he threw for 189 yards and 2 touchdowns in the 28-23 loss. On the season, he threw for 1,936 yards and 19 touchdowns with 5 interceptions. He threw for 374 yards against the Air Force Falcons on November 12. In the Famous Idaho Potato Bowl against the Idaho Vandals, he threw for a career high 445 yards and 5 touchdowns, but also threw 2 interceptions in the 61-50 shootout loss.

=== 2017 ===
The 2017 season was the best of his career, as he threw for 3,799 yards and 29 touchdowns. He passed for 334 yards and 3 touchdowns in a win over the Oregon State Beavers. He threw for 300 yards for the fifth time in the 2017 season against the Nevada Wolf Pack, where he threw for 384 yards and 4 touchdowns in a 44-42 win. He also threw for a 76 yard touchdown against the Hawaii Rainbow Warriors. His final career game as a Ram was in the New Mexico Bowl, a 31-28 loss to the Marshall Thundering Herd. In that game, he contributed for all CSU Rams touchdowns, as he threw for 2 touchdowns and ran for 2 more. Stevens finished his career with 8,554 yards, 70 touchdowns and 27 interceptions.

Before the 2018 NFL Draft, Stevens worked out with the Green Bay Packers as a Quarterback.

After going undrafted in the 2018 NFL draft, Stevens signed with the Denver Broncos. The Broncos released him in June 2018.

== See also ==
- 2015 Arizona Bowl
- 2017 New Mexico Bowl
- 2016 Famous Idaho Potato Bowl
