= Andre Chachere =

American football player (born 1996)

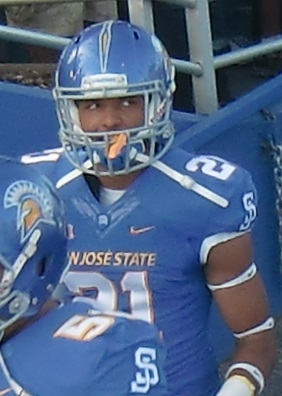
- Chachere with the San Jose State Spartans in 2014

Profile
- Position: Safety

Personal information
- Born: February 10, 1996 (age 30); Fresno, California, U.S.
- Listed height: 6 ft 0 in (1.83 m)
- Listed weight: 197 lb (89 kg)

Career information
- High school: Clovis West (Fresno)
- College: San Jose State (2014–2017)
- NFL draft: 2018: undrafted

Career history
- Houston Texans (2018)*; Detroit Lions (2018); Arizona Cardinals (2019)*; Carolina Panthers (2019)*; Arizona Cardinals (2019); Indianapolis Colts (2020); Philadelphia Eagles (2021–2022); Arizona Cardinals (2023); Jacksonville Jaguars (2024)*; Arizona Cardinals (2024)
- * Offseason or practice squad member only

Career NFL statistics
- Total tackles: 51
- Pass deflections: 3
- Stats at Pro Football Reference

Andre Maleek Chachere (born February 10, 1996) is an American former professional football player who was a safety in the National Football League (NFL). He played college football for the San Jose State Spartans.

== Early life ==
Born and raised in Fresno, California, Chachere graduated from Clovis West High School. His father Derrick Chachere played seven seasons in the Arena Football League from 1995 to 2002.

College recruiting
Name	Hometown	School	Height	Weight	40^{‡}	Commit date
Andre Chachere; CB	Fresno, CA	Clovis West HS	6 ft 0 in (1.83 m)	173 lb (78 kg)	4.66	Aug 22, 2013
Andre Chachere; CB	Recruit ratings: Rivals: 247Sports: ESPN:					
Overall recruit ranking: 247Sports: 80 (position); 83 (national class) ESPN: 46 (position)
‡ Refers to 40-yard dash; Note: In many cases, Scout, Rivals, 247Sports, On3, and ESPN may conflict in their listings of height, weight and 40 time.; In these cases, the average was taken. ESPN grades are on a 100-point scale.; Sources: "San Jose State Spartans 2014 Player Commits". ESPN.; "2014 Team Ranking". Rivals.com.; "San Jose State 2014 Football Commits". 247Sports.

== College career ==
At San Jose State University, Chachere played at cornerback for the San Jose State Spartans from 2014 to 2017. After playing primarily on special teams in his first season, Chachere was a starter for his last three seasons. In 49 career games, Chachere had 122 total tackles, 4.5 tackles for loss for 14 yards (including a sack), three forced fumbles, seven interceptions for 169 yards, and 27 passes defended. In San Jose State's 27-16 victory over Georgia State in the 2015 Cure Bowl, Chachere made an interception in the end zone in the final minute. Chachere graduated from San Jose State in May 2018 with a bachelor's degree in communication studies.

== Professional career ==
Pre-draft measurables
Height	Weight	Arm length	Hand span	40-yard dash	10-yard split	20-yard split	20-yard shuttle	Three-cone drill	Vertical jump	Broad jump	Bench press
5 ft 11 3/4 in (1.82 m)	197 lb (89 kg)	31 3/8 in (0.80 m)	9 7/8 in (0.25 m)	4.49 s	1.56 s	2.61 s	4.07 s	6.78 s	38.0 in (0.97 m)	10 ft 3 in (3.12 m)	13 reps
All values from NFL Combine

=== Houston Texans ===
Chachere signed with the Houston Texans as an undrafted free agent on May 11, 2018. He was waived on September 1, and was re-signed to the team's practice squad the following day.

=== Detroit Lions ===
On November 21, 2018, Chachere was signed to the Detroit Lions' practice squad. He was promoted to Detroit's active roster on December 29. Chachere was waived by the Lions during final roster cuts on August 30, 2019.

=== Arizona Cardinals (first stint) ===
On September 11, 2019, Chachere was signed to the Arizona Cardinals' practice squad. He was released by the Cardinals on October 11.

=== Carolina Panthers ===
Chachere was signed to the Carolina Panthers' practice squad on October 21, 2019.

=== Arizona Cardinals (second stint) ===
On December 18, 2019, Chachere was signed by the Arizona Cardinals off of the Panthers' practice squad. Chachere was released by Arizona on May 12, 2020.

=== Indianapolis Colts ===
Chachere had a tryout with the Indianapolis Colts on August 13, 2020, and with the Tennessee Titans on August 17. He visited the Colts again on August 20, and signed with them on August 23. Chachere was waived by Indianapolis on September 5, and was re-signed to the practice squad the next day.

On January 10, 2021, Chachere signed a reserve/futures contract with the Colts. On September 1, Chachere was waived by the Colts.

=== Philadelphia Eagles ===
On September 2, 2021, Chachere was claimed off waivers by the Philadelphia Eagles. During his first three games with the Eagles, Chachere primarily played a role as a gunner on special teams, but he has also served as the backup nickelback and safety. He was placed into COVID-19 protocols on December 27 but was activated on January 3, 2022, missing just one game.

On March 15, 2022, Chachere re-signed with the Eagles. On August 30, Chachere was waived by the Eagles and re-signed to the practice squad the next day. He was promoted to the active roster on November 8. Chachere was waived on December 6, and was subsequently re-signed to the practice squad. On February 17, 2023, Chachere signed a reserve/future contract with the Eagles. He was waived by Philadelphia on May 8.

=== Arizona Cardinals (third stint) ===
On May 9, 2023, Chachere was claimed off waivers by the Arizona Cardinals. He was waived on August 29, and was re-signed to the practice squad. Chachere was promoted to the active roster on September 16.

On August 27, 2024, Chachere was waived by the Cardinals.

=== Jacksonville Jaguars ===
On September 12, 2024, Chachere was signed to the Jacksonville Jaguars' practice squad. He was released by Jacksonville on October 7.

=== Arizona Cardinals (fourth stint) ===
On November 18, 2024, Chachere signed with the Arizona Cardinals' practice squad. He was promoted to the active roster on January 4, 2025.

On April 10, 2026, Chachere announced his retirement from professional football.
