= Matt Linehan =

American football coach

Current position
- Title: Wide receivers coach
- Team: Winona State Warriors
- Conference: NSIC

Playing career
- 2014–2017: Idaho
- 2019: Salt Lake Stallions
- Position: Quarterback

Coaching career (HC unless noted)
- 2020: San Diego State (GA)
- 2021: Missouri (GA)
- 2022–2024: Idaho (WR)
- 2025: Idaho (OC/QB)
- 2026–present: Winona State (WR)

Matt Linehan is an American football coach and former player who is currently the wide receivers coach for Winona State Warriors football team.

== Playing career ==
Linehan attended St. Mary's Preparatory in Orchard Lake Village, Michigan. He committed to play college football at Idaho, where his father and two uncles had played.

Linehan redshirted his true freshman season at Idaho after breaking his elbow. He started ten of the Vandals' 11 games as a redshirt freshman and passed for 2,540 yards with 11 touchdown passes against 18 interceptions. Linehan was named second-team All-Sun Belt Conference after passing for 3,184 yards and 19 touchdowns and was named the MVP of the 2016 Famous Idaho Potato Bowl in the Vandals' last bowl appearance. As a redshirt senior, he completed 173 of 281 pass attempts for 2,056 yards with 16 touchdowns and four interceptions through nine games before suffering a season ending thumb injury.

After going unselected in the 2018 NFL draft, Linehan took part in a rookie minicamp with the Minnesota Vikings on a tryout basis but was not offered a contract. He later played for the Salt Lake Stallions of the Alliance of American Football.

== Coaching career ==
Linehan began his coaching career as a graduate assistant at San Diego State in 2020. He was hired as an offensive graduate assistant at Missouri the following season.

Linehan was hired as the wide receivers coach at alma mater Idaho in 2022 under new head coach Jason Eck, and the Vandals advanced to the FCS playoffs for three consecutive seasons. He was promoted to offensive coordinator and quarterbacks coach for 2025 under new head coach Thomas Ford.

He was hired as the Winona State wide receiver coach on March 25, 2026.

== Personal ==
Linehan's father, Scott Linehan, played quarterback at Idaho and coached in the NFL and was the head coach of the St. Louis Rams.
