= Bisi Johnson =

American football player (born 1997)

Olabisi Johnson
No. 81
- Position: Wide receiver

Personal information
- Born: March 17, 1997 (age 29); Lakewood, Colorado, U.S.
- Listed height: 6 ft 0 in (1.83 m)
- Listed weight: 210 lb (95 kg)

Career information
- High school: Bear Creek (Lakewood)
- College: Colorado State (2015–2018)
- NFL draft: 2019: 7th round, 247th overall pick

Career history
- Minnesota Vikings (2019–2022)

Career NFL statistics
- Receptions: 45
- Receiving yards: 483
- Receiving touchdowns: 3
- Stats at Pro Football Reference

Olabisi Johnson (born March 17, 1997) is an American former professional football player who was a wide receiver in the National Football League (NFL). He played college football for the Colorado State Rams and was selected by the Minnesota Vikings in the seventh round of the 2019 NFL draft.

== Early life ==
Born in Wheat Ridge, Colorado, to Bode and Traci Johnson, Bisi played baseball and a number of other sports as a kid. He attended Bear Creek High School in Lakewood, Colorado, where he became a two-sport star in football and track, earning three varsity letters in both sports. He also excelled in the classroom, earning a spot on Bear Creek's Academic Athletics Honor Roll (2011–14) and was a two-time Academic All-Colorado performer (2013–14). In football, he was captain of the Bear Creek football program in 2013 and 2014. As a senior, he earned first-team All-Colorado honors after leading the Bears to a 7–4 record along with a first-round playoff victory, rushing for 698 yards with nine touchdowns and catching 25 passes for 402 yards and three more scores, racking up more than 1,500 yards of total offense running, receiving, along with returning kickoffs and punts; defensively, he led the team in tackles from his safety position with 100, including 74 solo stops. After graduating, Johnson committed to CSU over reported scholarship offers from the Army and Northern Colorado.

Also an accomplished track and field athlete, Johnson holds the school record in the 4 × 100 m relay at 42.72 seconds. At the 2014 Class 5A Colorado state meet, he won the 110-meter hurdles with a time of 14.34 seconds, the 300-meter hurdles with a time of 39.46 second and the pole vault (14'1" or 4.29m). He was a finalist for both hurdle events as a sophomore. At the 2015 LPS Spring Break Duals, he won the 100 meters with a time of 11.11 seconds.

== College career ==
Johnson appeared in 49 career games, starting 27 for the Rams. He finished his career with 125 receptions for 2,019 yards and 11 touchdowns, being one of just 10 Rams all-time to have more than 2,000 receiving yards in a career. He set the CSU single-game record for with 265 receiving yards on a career-high 7 receptions, with 2 touchdown catches against Idaho in the 2016 Famous Idaho Potato Bowl.

== Professional career ==
External videos
- Johnson's NFL Combine workout
- Johnson gets drafted by Minnesota

Pre-draft measurables
Height	Weight	Arm length	Hand span	40-yard dash	10-yard split	20-yard split	20-yard shuttle	Three-cone drill	Vertical jump	Broad jump	Bench press
6 ft 0 1/2 in (1.84 m)	204 lb (93 kg)	30 3/4 in (0.78 m)	10 3/8 in (0.26 m)	4.51 s	1.61 s	2.64 s	4.16 s	6.88 s	38 in (0.97 m)	10 ft 4 in (3.15 m)	14 reps
All values from NFL Combine

Johnson was selected by the Minnesota Vikings in the seventh round (247th overall) of the 2019 NFL draft.

In his rookie season with the Vikings, Johnson played in all 16 games and started six of them, filling in for an injured Adam Thielen. He finished the year with a statline of 31 receptions for 294 yards and three touchdowns.

Johnson began his second season starting at receiver alongside Thielen, and in their first game of the year against the Green Bay Packers, Johnson recorded 3 receptions for a career high 56 yards. However, before Week 3, rookie Justin Jefferson was named the starter over Johnson, who moved back into a reserve role.

On July 31, 2021, Johnson tore his ACL in training camp and missed the entirety of the 2021 season.

On August 29, 2022, Johnson was placed on injured reserve after suffering a torn ACL.

== Personal life ==
Olabisi, which means "to bring prosperity to your family", is of Nigerian descent through his father, Bode Johnson, who attended college at Federal Polytechnic Ilaro in Nigeria. Bisi traveled to the African nation several times as a child to visit his grandparents, aunts and uncles and their families. Johnson received his bachelor's degree in hospitality management from CSU in December 2018.
