= Dalyn Dawkins =

American football player (born 1994)

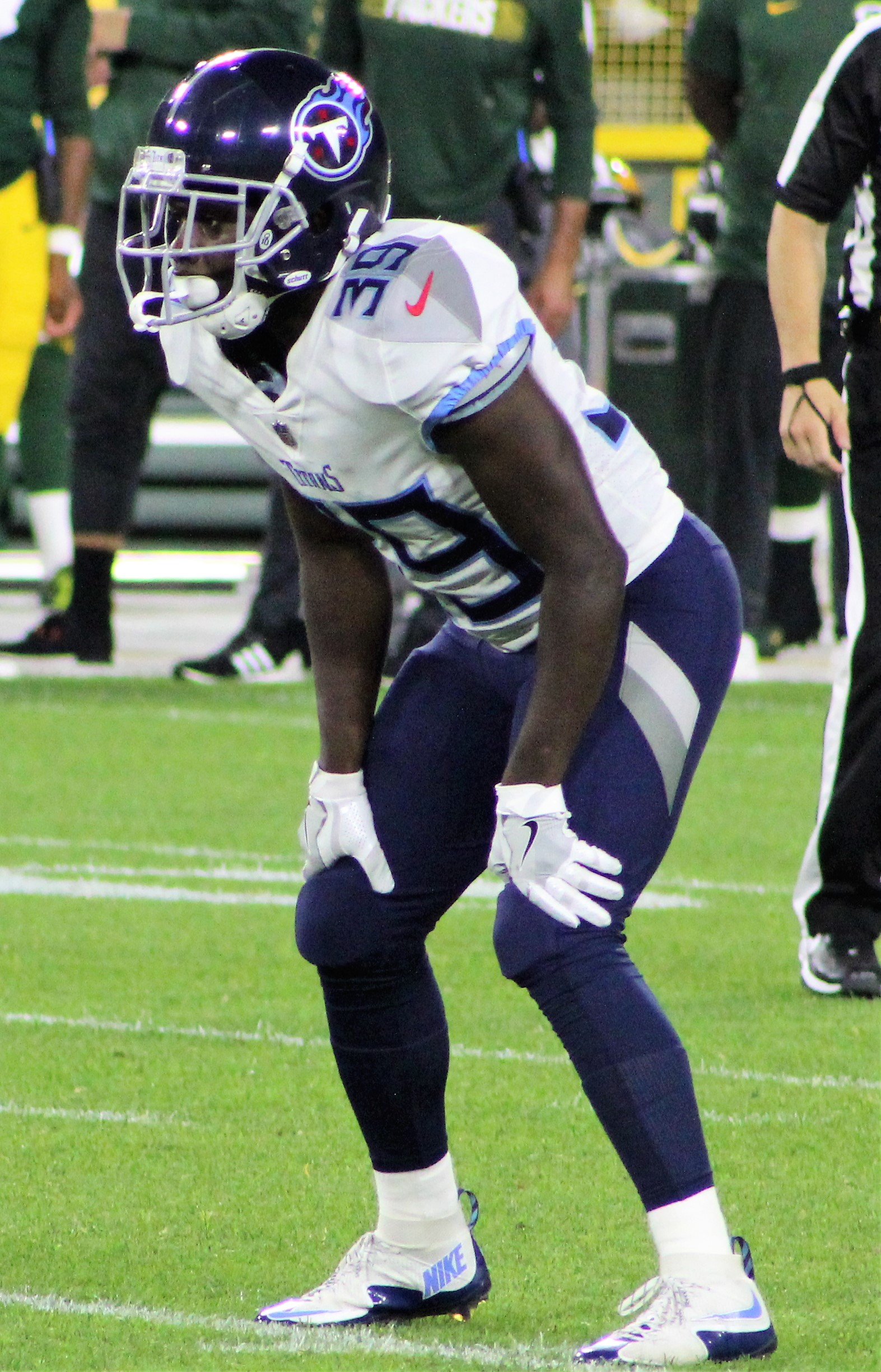
- Dawkins with the Tennessee Titans in 2018

No. 39, 28
- Position: Running back

Personal information
- Born: December 26, 1994 (age 31); Louisville, Kentucky, U.S.
- Listed height: 5 ft 7 in (1.70 m)
- Listed weight: 183 lb (83 kg)

Career information
- High school: Trinity (Louisville)
- College: Colorado State
- NFL draft: 2018: undrafted

Career history
- Tennessee Titans (2018–2019); Detroit Lions (2020)*; Houston Gamblers (2022)
- * Offseason or practice squad member only

Awards and highlights
- Second-team All-MWC (2017)

Career NFL statistics
- Rushing attempts: 11
- Rushing yards: 26
- Stats at Pro Football Reference

Dalyn Daeel Dawkins (born December 26, 1994) is an American former professional football player who was a running back in the National Football League (NFL). He played college football for the Colorado State Rams.

== Early life ==
Dawkins was born and grew up in Louisville, Kentucky and attended Trinity High School. He rushed for 1,479 yards and 18 touchdowns as a senior for the Shamrocks and was named second-team All-State by the Louisville Courier-Journal. Dawkins was rated a three-star prospect by Rivals.com and a four-star by Scout.com and was ranked the ninth-best college prospect in the state for the 2013 recruiting class and committed to play college football for Purdue over offers from Colorado State, Illinois, Cincinnati, Ball State and Western Kentucky.

== College career ==
Dawkins began his collegiate career at Purdue. As a freshman Dawkins rushed for 115 yards on 32 carries with nine receptions for 84 yards in nine games for the Boilermakers. Following the season, Dawkins announced that he would be transferring to Colorado State University in part because of Purdue's pass-heavy offense. After sitting out the 2014 season due to NCAA transfer rules, Dawkins played for the final three seasons of his eligibility with the Rams. As a redshirt sophomore, Dawkins appeared in 12 games (nine starts) and rushed for 867 yards on 170 carries and one touchdown along with 178 yards and one touchdown on 24 pass receptions. He rushed for 919 yards on 161 carries with four touchdowns and 20 receptions for 157 yards and a touchdown in 12 games (11 starts) the following season. As a senior, Dawkins rushed for 1,349 yards and eight touchdowns and had 100-yards rushing in seven of Colorado State's eight conference games and was named second-team All-Mountain West Conference. He finished his career with 3,185 rushing yards, the third-most in CSU history, on 557 carries with 14 touchdowns and caught 70 passes for 650 yards and three touchdowns.

== Professional career ==
=== Tennessee Titans ===
Dawkins was signed by the Tennessee Titans as an undrafted free agent on May 11, 2018. He was added to the active roster on September 18 and made his NFL debut on September 23 against the Jacksonville Jaguars. He was waived on October 8, 2018, and was re-signed to the practice squad. On November 13, 2018, he was promoted to the active roster after the Titans released Jalston Fowler. Dawkins was waived by the Titans on December 3, 2018, and re-signed to the practice squad. He signed a reserve/future contract with the Titans on December 31, 2018.

Dawkins made the Titans' 53-man roster out of training camp for the 2019 season but was waived after Week 1 on September 10, 2019, and re-signed to the practice squad. He was promoted to the active roster on October 8, 2019. He was waived on October 26 and re-signed to the practice squad. Dawkins was signed to the active roster on December 21, 2019. He was waived on December 23 and re-signed to the practice squad. He signed a reserve/future contract with the Titans on January 20, 2020. He was waived on August 19, 2020.

=== Detroit Lions ===
On October 22, 2020, Dawkins was signed to the Detroit Lions' practice squad. He was released two days later, and re-signed to the practice squad on October 29. He was released on November 4, and re-signed to the practice squad again on November 11. He was released again on December 15, 2020, and re-signed to their practice squad again on December 23, 2020.

=== Houston Gamblers ===
Dawkins was selected in the 27th round of the 2022 USFL draft by the Houston Gamblers. He was ruled inactive for the team's game against the New Orleans Breakers on May 8, 2022, and moved back to the active roster on May 14.

== Personal life ==
Dawkins is the nephew of Hall of Fame safety Brian Dawkins. His father, Ralph Dawkins, played college football as a running back for Louisville and signed with the New Orleans Saints as an undrafted free agent, but never appeared in an NFL game due to injury.
