= 2019 Mountain West Conference football season =

- League: NCAA Division I Football Bowl Subdivision
- Sport: football
- Duration: August 2019–January 2020
- Teams: 12
- TV partner(s): CBSSN, ABC, ESPN, ESPN2, ESPNU, CBS, Stadium, ATTSN

2020 NFL Draft
- Top draft pick: QB Jordan Love, Utah State
- Picked by: Green Bay Packers, 26th overall

Regular season
- Mountain Division champions: Boise State Broncos
- Mountain Division runners-up: Air Force Falcons
- West Division champions: Hawaii Rainbow Warriors
- West Division runners-up: San Diego State Aztecs

Championship Game
- Champions: Boise State
- Runners-up: Hawaii

Football seasons
- 2018 2020

2019 Mountain West Conference football standings
	Conf.			Overall
Team	W		L	W		L
Mountain Division
No. 23 Boise State xy$	8	–	0	12	–	2
No. 22 Air Force	7	–	1	11	–	2
Utah State	6	–	2	7	–	6
Wyoming	4	–	4	8	–	5
Colorado State	3	–	5	4	–	8
New Mexico	0	–	8	2	–	10
West Division
Hawaii xy	5	–	3	10	–	5
San Diego State x	5	–	3	10	–	3
Nevada	4	–	4	7	–	6
San Jose State	2	–	6	5	–	7
UNLV	2	–	6	4	–	8
Fresno State	2	–	6	4	–	8
Championship: Boise State 31, Hawaii 10
$ – Conference champion; x – Division champion/co-champions; y – Championship game participant; Rankings from AP Poll

The 2019 Mountain West Conference football season, part of that year's NCAA Division I FBS football season, is the 21st season of College Football for the Mountain West Conference (MW) since 2012. 12 teams have competed in the MW-football conference. The season began on August 24, 2019, and will end on November 30. The entire schedule was released on February 4, 2019.

== Preseason ==
=== Mountain West Media ===
The Mountain West Media Days took place on July 23 and 24 at the Cosmopolitan.

=== Preseason Polls ===
Place	Mountain Division	West Division
1	Boise State (15) 120	Fresno State (17) 122
2	Utah State (6) 108	San Diego State (3) 106
3	Air Force 73	Nevada 74
4	Wyoming 66	Hawai'i (1) 67
5	Colorado State 52	UNLV 51
6	New Mexico 22	San Jose State 22

- First place votes in parentheses

==== Preseason All–Mountain West team ====
Offense
Position	Player	Class	Team
QB	Jordan Love**	Jr.	Utah State
WR	John Hightower	Sr.	Boise State
WR	Cedric Byrd II	Sr.	Hawai'i
RB	Juwan Washington	Sr.	San Diego State
RB	Toa Taua	So.	Nevada
OL	Ezra Cleveland*	Jr.	Boise State
OL	John Molchon*	Sr.	Boise State
OL	Jake Nelson	Sr.	Nevada
OL	Keith Ismael	Jr.	San Diego State
OL	Justin Polu	Sr.	UNLV
TE	Jared Rice**	Sr.	Fresno State

Defense
Position	Player	Class	Team
DL	Jordan Jackson**	Jr.	Air Force
DL	David Moa*	Sr.	Boise State
DL	Curtis Weaver	Jr.	Boise State
DL	Tipa Galeai	Sr.	Utah State
LB	Mykal Walker	Sr.	Fresno State
LB	Kyahva Tezino*	Sr.	San Diego State
LB	David Woodward**	Jr.	Utah State
DB	Jeremy Fejedelem	Sr.	Air Force
DB	JuJu Hughes**	Sr.	Fresno State
DB	Tariq Thompson**	Jr.	San Diego State
DB	DJ Williams	So.	Utah State

Specialists
Position	Player	Class	Team
P	Ryan Stonehouse*	Jr.	Colorado State
PK	Cooper Rothe*	Sr.	Wyoming
KR/PR	Savon Scarver*	Jr.	Utah State

- Preseason Offensive Player of the Year:

Jordan Love, Jr., QB, Utah State

- Preseason Defensive Player of the Year:

Curtis Weaver, Jr., DL, Boise State

- Preseason Special Teams Player of the Year:

Cooper Rothe, Sr., PK, Wyoming

(* – member of the 2018 All–Mountain West first team)

(** – member of the 2018 All–Mountain West second team)

== Rankings ==
Listed are the Mountain West teams who were ranked or received votes at some point during the season. Colorado State, Nevada, New Mexico, San Jose State, and UNLV were never ranked nor received any votes.

Legend
	Improvement in ranking
	Drop in ranking
	Not ranked previous week
RV	Received votes but were not ranked in Top 25 of poll

		Pre	Wk 1	Wk 2	Wk 3	Wk 4	Wk 5	Wk 6	Wk 7	Wk 8	Wk 9	Wk 10	Wk 11	Wk 12	Wk 13	Wk 14	Wk 15	Final
Air Force Falcons	AP												RV	RV	RV	25	24	22
Air Force Falcons	C						RV				RV	RV	RV	RV	RV	25	24	23
Air Force Falcons	CFP	Not released																
Boise State Broncos	AP	RV	24	22	20	16	16	14	14	22	21	21	19	20	20	19	18	23
Boise State Broncos	C	RV	24	22	20	15	15	14	13	21	21	21	19	19	19	17	18	22
Boise State Broncos	CFP	Not released										22	21	20	20	19	19	
Fresno State Bulldogs	AP	RV																
Fresno State Bulldogs	C	RV	RV															
Fresno State Bulldogs	CFP	Not released																
Hawaii Rainbow Warriors	AP																	
Hawaii Rainbow Warriors	C		RV	RV		RV	RV	RV							RV	RV	RV	RV
Hawaii Rainbow Warriors	CFP	Not released																
San Diego State Aztecs	AP								RV	RV	25	24	RV	RV				RV
San Diego State Aztecs	C							RV	RV	RV	RV	24	RV	25	RV	RV	RV	RV
San Diego State Aztecs	CFP	Not released																
Utah State Aggies	AP	RV																
Utah State Aggies	C	RV				RV	RV			RV								
Utah State Aggies	CFP	Not released																
Wyoming Cowboys	AP																	
Wyoming Cowboys	C		RV	RV	RV		RV				RV	RV	RV					
Wyoming Cowboys	CFP	Not released																

== Coaches ==
=== Coaching changes ===
There was only one coaching change in the Mountain West Conference for the 2019 season.

Gary Andersen, who previously coached at Utah State, returned to Logan to replace Matt Wells, who left to coach at Texas Tech.

Team	Head coach	Years at school	Overall record	Record at school	MW record
Air Force	Troy Calhoun	13	87–67	87–67	52–44
Boise State	Bryan Harsin	6	57–20	49–13	32–8
Colorado State	Mike Bobo	5	24–27	24–27	17–15
Fresno State	Jeff Tedford	3	104–63	17–5	14–2
Hawaii	Nick Rolovich	4	18–22	18–22	10–15
Nevada	Jay Norvell	3	8–14	8–14	8–8
New Mexico	Bob Davie	8	68–79	33–54	17–39
San Diego State	Rocky Long	9	136–105	71–37	46–17
San Jose State	Brent Brennan	3	3–22	3–22	2–15
UNLV	Tony Sanchez	5	16–32	16–32	11–21
Utah State	Gary Andersen	5	57–61	31–25	35–23
Wyoming	Craig Bohl	6	132–67	28–34	19–21

== Schedule ==
The Regular season will begin on August 24 and will end on November 30.

=== Regular season ===
Index to colors and formatting
Mountain West member won
Mountain West member lost
Mountain West teams in **bold**

==== Week One ====
Date	Time	Visiting team	Home team	Site	TV	Result	Attendance	Ref.
August 24	4:30 p.m.	Arizona	**Hawaii**	Aloha Stadium • Honolulu, HI	CBSSN	**W** 45–38	22,396	
August 29	7:00 p.m.	Northern Colorado	**San Jose**	CEFCU Stadium • San Jose, CA		**W** 35–18	13,480	
August 30	6:00 p.m.	**Utah State**	Wake Forest	BB&T Field • Winston-Salem, NC	ACCN	**L** 35–38	29,027	
August 30	6:30 p.m.	Purdue	**Nevada**	Mackay Stadium • Reno, NV	CBSSN	**W** 34–31	20,144	
August 30	8:00 p.m.	**Colorado State**	Colorado	Broncos Stadium at Mile High • Denver, CO (Rocky Mountain Showdown)	ESPN	**L** 31–52	76,125	
August 31	10:00 a.m.	**Boise State**	Florida State	Doak Campbell Stadium • Tallahassee, FL (Note: The game against Boise State was originally scheduled for 7:00 p.m. EDT at TIAA Bank Stadium in Jacksonville, but was moved over safety concerns related to Hurricane Dorian.)	ESPNews	**W** 36–31	50,917	
August 31	1:30 p.m.	Colgate	**Air Force**	Falcon Stadium • Colorado Springs, CO		**W** 48–7	33,101	
August 31	4:00 p.m.	Sam Houston State	**New Mexico**	Dreamstyle Stadium • Albuquerque, NM		**W** 39–31	13,749	
August 31	5:30 p.m.	Missouri	**Wyoming**	War Memorial Stadium • Laramie, WY		**W** 37–31	26,037	
August 31	7:00 p.m.	Weber State	**San Diego State**	SDCCU Stadium • San Diego, CA		**W** 6–0	40,222	
August 31	7:00 p.m.	Southern Utah	**UNLV**	Sam Boyd Stadium • Whitney, NV		**W** 56–23	17,421	
August 31	7:30 p.m.	**Fresno State**	USC	United Airlines Field at the Los Angeles Memorial Coliseum • Los Angeles, CA	ESPN	**L** 23–31	57,329	
^{#}Rankings from AP Poll released prior to game. All times are in Mountain Time.

==== Week Two ====
Date	Time	Visiting team	Home team	Site	TV	Result	Attendance	Ref.
September 6	7:00 p.m.	Marshall	No. 24 **Boise State**	Albertsons Stadium • Boise, ID	ESPN2	**W** 14–7	31,951	
September 7	2:00 p.m.	Western Illinois	**Colorado State**	Canvas Stadium • Fort Collins, CO		**W** 38–13	24,453	
September 7	2:15 p.m.	**San Diego State**	UCLA	Rose Bowl • Pasadena, CA	P12N	**W** 24–14	36,951	
September 7	5:00 p.m.	**Wyoming**	Texas State	Bobcat Stadium • San Marcos, TX	ESPN+	**W** 23–14	20,003	
September 7	5:30 p.m.	**Nevada**	No. 16 Oregon	Autzen Stadium • Eugene, OR	P12N	**L** 6–77	50,920	
September 7	5:30 p.m.	Stony Brook	**Utah State**	Maverik Stadium • Logan, UT	Facebook	**W** 62–7	22,247	
September 7	7:00 p.m.	Tulsa	**San Jose State**	CEFCU Stadium • San Jose, CA	ESPN3	**L** 16–34	12,471	
September 7	8:00 p.m.	Arkansas State	**UNLV**	Sam Boyd Stadium • Whitney, NV	Stadium	**L** 17–43	18,472	
September 7	8:30 p.m.	Minnesota	**Fresno State**	Bulldog Stadium • Fresno, CA	CBSSN	**L** 35–38 ^{2OT}	34,790	
September 7	9:59 p.m.	Oregon State	**Hawaii**	Aloha Stadium • Honolulu, HI	Spectrum PPV	**W** 31–28	26,807	
^{#}Rankings from AP Poll released prior to game. All times are in Mountain Time.

==== Week Three ====
Date	Time	Visiting team	Home team	Site	TV	Result	Attendance	Ref.
September 14	11:00 a.m.	**Air Force**	Colorado	Folsom Field • Boulder, CO	P12N	**W** 30–23 ^{OT}	49,282	
September 14	12:30 p.m.	**New Mexico**	No. 7 Notre Dame	Notre Dame Stadium • Notre Dame, IN	NBC	**L** 14–66	77,622	
September 14	1:30 p.m.	**UNLV**	Northwestern	Ryan Field • Evanston, IL	BTN	**L** 14–30	37,714	
September 14	2:00 p.m.	**Colorado State**	Arkansas	Donald W. Reynolds Razorback Stadium • Fayetteville, AR	SECN	**L** 34–55	55,583	
September 14	3:00 p.m.	Idaho	**Wyoming**	War Memorial Stadium • Laramie, WY	ESPN3	**W** 21–16	28,814	
September 14	5:00 p.m.	Weber State	**Nevada**	Mackay Stadium • Reno, NV	ESPN3	**W** 19–13	14,174	
September 14	5:30 p.m.	**Hawaii**	No. 23 Washington	Husky Stadium • Seattle, WA	P12N	**L** 20–52	67,589	
September 14	6:00 p.m.	**San Diego State**	New Mexico State	Aggie Memorial Stadium • Las Cruces, NM	FloSports	**W** 31–10	10,123	
September 14	8:15 p.m.	Portland State	No. 22 **Boise State**	Albertsons Stadium • Boise, ID	ESPN2	**W** 45–10	31,068	
^{#}Rankings from AP Poll released prior to game. All times are in Mountain Time.

==== Week Four ====
Date	Time	Visiting team	Home team	Site	TV	Result	Attendance	Ref.
September 20	7:00 p.m.	**Air Force**	No. 20 **Boise State**	Albertsons Stadium • Boise, ID	ESPN2	**BSU** 30–19	36,498	
September 21	1:30 p.m.	**Wyoming**	Tulsa	H. A. Chapman Stadium • Tulsa, OK	CBSSN	**L** 21–24	16,246	
September 21	2:30 p.m.	New Mexico State	**New Mexico**	Dreamstyle Stadium • Albuquerque, NM (Rio Grande Rivalry)		**W** 55–52	27,269	
September 21	5:30 p.m.	**San Jose State**	Arkansas	Donald W. Reynolds Razorback Stadium • Fayetteville, AR	SECN	**W** 31–24	56,058	
September 21	6:00 p.m.	**Nevada**	UTEP	Sun Bowl • El Paso, TX	ESPN3	**W** 37–21	10,493	
September 21	8:00 p.m.	Sacramento State	**Fresno State**	Bulldog Stadium • Fresno, CA		**W** 34–20	31,034	
September 21	8:15 p.m.	Toledo	**Colorado State**	Canvas Stadium • Fort Collins, CO	ESPN2	**L** 35–41	24,464	
September 21	8:30 p.m.	**Utah State**	**San Diego State**	SDCCU Stadium • San Diego, CA	CBSSN	**USU** 23–17	27,367	
September 21	9:59 p.m.	Central Arkansas	**Hawaii**	Aloha Stadium • Honolulu, HI	Spectrum PPV	**W** 35–16	23,465	
^{#}Rankings from AP Poll released prior to game. All times are in Mountain Time.

==== Week Five ====
Date	Time	Visiting team	Home team	Site	TV	Result	Attendance	Ref.
September 27	6:00 p.m.	San Jose State	**Air Force**	Falcon Stadium • Colorado Springs, CO	CBSSN	**AF** 41–24	24,786	
September 28	4:00 p.m.	New Mexico	Liberty	Williams Stadium • Lynchburg, VA	ESPN+	**L** 10–17	17,101	
September 28	5:30 p.m.	Colorado State	**Utah State**	Maverik Stadium • Logan, UT	CBSSN	**USU** 34–24	20,017	
September 28	6:00 p.m.	Fresno State	New Mexico State	Aggie Memorial Stadium • Las Cruces, NM	FloSports	**W** 30–17	8,872	
September 28	6:00 p.m.	UNLV	**Wyoming**	War Memorial Stadium • Laramie, WY	ESPNU	**WYO** 53–17	23,029	
September 28	8:30 p.m.	Hawaii	**Nevada**	Mackay Stadium • Reno, NV	ESPN2	**HAW** 54–3	15,137	
^{#}Rankings from AP Poll released prior to game. All times are in Mountain Time.

==== Week Six ====
Date	Time	Visiting team	Home team	Site	TV	Result	Attendance	Ref.
October 4	8:00 p.m.	**New Mexico**	**San Jose State**	CEFCU Stadium • San Jose, CA	CBSSN	**SJSU** 32–21	16,119	
October 5	10:00 a.m.	**Utah State**	No. 5 LSU	Tiger Stadium • Baton Rouge, LA	SECN	**L** 6–42	100,266	
October 5	1:30 p.m.	**Air Force**	Navy	Navy–Marine Corps Memorial Stadium • Annapolis, MD (Commander-in-Chief's Trophy)	CBSSN	**L** 25–34	37,957	
October 5	8:00 p.m.	**San Diego State**	**Colorado State**	Canvas Stadium • Fort Collins, CO	ESPN2	**SDSU** 24–10	29,767	
October 5	8:30 p.m.	No. 16 **Boise State**	**UNLV**	Sam Boyd Stadium • Whitney, NV	CBSSN	**BSU** 38–13	24,681	
^{#}Rankings from AP Poll released prior to game. All times are in Mountain Time.

==== Week Seven ====
Date	Time	Visiting team	Home team	Site	TV	Result	Attendance	Ref.
October 11	6:00 p.m.	Colorado State	**New Mexico**	Dreamstyle Stadium • Albuquerque, NM	CBSSN	**CSU** 35–21	15,393	
October 12	2:00 p.m.	UNLV	Vanderbilt	Vanderbilt Stadium • Nashville, TN	SECN	**W** 34–10	20,048	
October 12	2:00 p.m.	San Jose State	**Nevada**	Mackay Stadium • Reno, NV		**NEV** 41–38	15,311	
October 12	5:00 p.m.	Fresno State	**Air Force**	Falcon Stadium • Colorado Springs, CO	CBSSN	**AF** 43–24	22,544	
October 12	8:15 p.m.	Hawaii	No. 14 **Boise State**	Albertsons Stadium • Boise, ID	ESPN2	**BSU** 59–37	36,902	
October 12	8:30 p.m.	Wyoming	**San Diego State**	SDCCU Stadium • San Diego, CA	CBSSN	**SDSU** 26–22	28,758	
^{#}Rankings from AP Poll released prior to game. All times are in Mountain Time.

==== Week Eight ====
Date	Time	Visiting team	Home team	Site	TV	Result	Attendance	Ref.
October 18	8:00 p.m.	**UNLV**	**Fresno State**	Bulldog Stadium • Fresno, CA	CBSSN	**FRES** 56–27	26,256	
October 19	1:00 p.m.	**New Mexico**	**Wyoming**	War Memorial Stadium • Laramie, WY	AT&TSNRM	**WYO** 23–10	22,884	
October 19	5:00 p.m.	**San Diego State**	**San Jose State**	CEFCU Stadium • San Jose, CA	Stadium	**SDSU** 27–17	18,285	
October 19	8:15 p.m.	No. 14 **Boise State**	BYU	LaVell Edwards Stadium • Provo, UT	ESPN2	**L** 25–28	58,930	
October 19	8:15 p.m.	**Nevada**	**Utah State**	Maverik Stadium • Logan, UT	ESPNU	**USU** 36–10	15,240	
October 19	9:00 p.m.	**Air Force**	**Hawaii**	Aloha Stadium • Honolulu, HI (Kuter Trophy)	CBSSN	**AF** 56–26	23,757	
^{#}Rankings from AP Poll released prior to game. All times are in Mountain Time.

==== Week Nine ====
Date	Time	Visiting team	Home team	Site	TV	Result	Attendance	Ref.
October 26	10:00 a.m.	San Jose State	Army	Michie Stadium • West Point, NY	CBSSN	**W** 34–29	35,346	
October 26	12:00 p.m.	Nevada	**Wyoming**	War Memorial Stadium • Laramie, WY	AT&TSNRM	**WYO** 31–3	16,126	
October 26	2:00 p.m.	Hawaii	**New Mexico**	Dreamstyle Stadium • Albuquerque, NM	SPEC HI	**UH** 45–31	12,617	
October 26	5:30 p.m.	Colorado State	**Fresno State**	Bulldog Stadium • Fresno, CA	ESPNU	**CSU** 41–31	32,890	
October 26	8:15 p.m.	Utah State	**Air Force**	Falcon Stadium • Colorado Springs, CO	ESPN2	**AF** 31–7	19,248	
October 26	8:30 p.m.	San Diego State	**UNLV**	Sam Boyd Stadium • Whitney, NV	CBSSN	**SDSU** 20–17	19,652	
^{#}Rankings from AP Poll released prior to game. All times are in Mountain Time.

==== Week Ten ====
Date	Time	Visiting team	Home team	Site	TV	Result	Attendance	Ref.
November 2	1:30 p.m.	Army	Air Force	Falcon Stadium • Colorado Springs, CO (Commander-in-Chief's Trophy)	CBSSN	**W** 17–13	41,401	
November 2	1:30 p.m.	**UNLV**	Colorado State	Canvas Stadium • Fort Collins, CO	AT&TSN	**CSU** 37–17	24,103	
November 2	8:00 p.m.	BYU	Utah State	Maverik Stadium • Logan, UT	ESPN2	**L** 14–42	25,472	
November 2	8:30 p.m.	**New Mexico**	Nevada	Mackay Stadium • Reno, NV	ESPNU	**NEV** 21–10	15,631	
November 2	8:30 p.m.	No. 21 **Boise State**	San Jose State	CEFCU Stadium • San Jose, CA	CBSSN	**BSU** 52–42	19,184	
November 2	9:59 p.m.	**Fresno State**	Hawaii	Aloha Stadium • Honolulu, HI (Golden Screwdriver Trophy)	Spectrum PPV/Facebook	**FRES** 41–38	22,058	
^{#}Rankings from AP Poll released prior to game. All times are in Mountain Time.

==== Week Eleven ====
Date	Time	Visiting team	Home team	Site	TV	Result	Attendance	Ref.
November 9	5:00 p.m.	**Utah State**	**Fresno State**	Bulldog Stadium • Fresno, CA	CBSSN	**USU** 35–37	32,037	
November 9	8:15 p.m.	**Wyoming**	No. 21 **Boise State**	Albertsons Stadium • Boise, ID	ESPN	**BSU** 20–17 ^{OT}	33,018	
November 9	8:30 p.m.	**Nevada**	No. 24 **San Diego State**	SDCCU Stadium • San Diego, CA	ESPN2	**NEV** 17–13	27,973	
November 9	9:00 p.m.	**San Jose State**	**Hawaii**	Aloha Stadium • Honolulu, HI (Dick Tomey Legacy Series)	SPEC PPV	**UH** 42–40	19,858	
^{#}Rankings from AP Poll released prior to game. All times are in Mountain Time.

==== Week Twelve ====
Date	Time	Visiting team	Home team	Site	TV	Result	Attendance	Ref.
November 15	7:30 p.m.	**Fresno State**	**San Diego State**	SDCCU Stadium • San Diego, CA	ESPN2	**SDSU** 17–7	26,876	
November 16	2:00 p.m.	**Wyoming**	**Utah State**	Romney Stadium • Logan, UT (Bridger's Battle)	ESPNU	**USU** 26–21	16,364	
November 16	2:00 p.m.	**Hawaii**	**UNLV**	Sam Boyd Stadium • Whitney, NV (Island Showdown)	Facebook	**HAW** 21–7	21,317	
November 16	5:00 p.m.	**Air Force**	**Colorado State**	Canvas Stadium • Fort Collins, CO (Ram–Falcon Trophy)	ESPN2	**AF** 38–21	24,914	
November 16	8:15 p.m.	**New Mexico**	No. 19 **Boise State**	Albertsons Stadium • Boise, ID	ESPN2	**BSU** 42–9	31,492	
^{#}Rankings from AP Poll released prior to game. All times are in Mountain Time.

==== Week Thirteen ====
Date	Time	Visiting team	Home team	Site	TV	Result	Attendance	Ref.
November 22	7:30 p.m.	**Colorado State**	Wyoming	War Memorial Stadium • Laramie, WY (Border War)	ESPN2	**WYO** 17–7	21,152	
November 23	12:00 p.m.	**Air Force**	New Mexico	Dreamstyle Stadium • Albuquerque, NM	ESPN3	**AF** 44–22	13,844	
November 23	1:00 p.m.	**San Jose State**	UNLV	Sam Boyd Stadium • Whitney, NV		**UNLV** 38–35	17,373	
November 23	8:30 p.m.	No. 20 **Boise State**	Utah State	Maverik Stadium • Logan, UT	CBSSN	**BSU** 56–21	18,315	
November 23	8:30 p.m.	**Nevada**	Fresno State	Bulldog Stadium • Fresno, CA	ESPN2	**NEV** 35–28	32,303	
November 23	9:00 p.m.	**San Diego State**	Hawaii	Aloha Stadium • Honolulu, HI	SPEC PPV	**HAW** 14–11	24,911	
^{#}Rankings from AP Poll released prior to game. All times are in Mountain Time.

==== Week Fourteen ====
Date	Time	Visiting team	Home team	Site	TV	Result	Attendance	Ref.
November 29	1:30 p.m.	No. 20 **Boise State**	Colorado State	Canvas Stadium • Fort Collins, CO	CBSSN	**BSU** 31–24	12,324	
November 30	12:00 p.m.	**Wyoming**	Air Force	Falcon Stadium • Colorado Springs, CO		**AFA** 20–6	21,425	
November 30	1:00 p.m.	**UNLV**	Nevada	Mackay Stadium • Reno, NV (Fremont Cannon)		**UNLV** 33–30 ^{OT}	16,683	
November 30	2:00 p.m.	**Utah State**	New Mexico	Dreamstyle Stadium • Albuquerque, NM		**USU** 38–25	11,611	
November 30	7:00 p.m.	BYU	San Diego State	SDCCU Stadium • San Diego, CA	CBSSN	**W** 13–3	28,180	
November 30	8:30 p.m.	**Fresno State**	San Jose State	CEFCU Stadium • San Jose, CA (Valley Trophy)		**SJSU** 17–16	12,835	
November 30	9:59 p.m.	Army	Hawaii	Aloha Stadium • Honolulu, HI	CBSSN	**W** 52–31	26,256	
^{#}Rankings from AP Poll released prior to game. All times are in Mountain Time.

=== Championship Game ===
==== Week Fifteen (Mountain West Championship game) ====
The 2019 Mountain West Conference Championship Game was held on December 7 between the champions of the Mountain Division and the West Division.

Date	Time	Visiting team	Home team	Site	TV	Result	Attendance	Ref.
December 7	2:00 p.m.	Hawaii	No. 19 Boise State	Albertsons Stadium • Boise, ID	ESPN	**BSU** 31–10	23,561	
^{#}Rankings from AP Poll released prior to game. All times are in Mountain Time Zone.

== Postseason ==
=== Bowl games ===
Legend
Mountain West win
Mountain West loss

Bowl game	Date	Site	Television	Time (MST)	Mountain West team	Opponent	Score	Attendance
Frisco Bowl	December 20	Toyota Stadium • Frisco, TX	ESPN2	5:30 p.m.	Utah State	Kent State	41–51	12,120
New Mexico Bowl	December 21	Dreamstyle Stadium • Albuquerque, NM	ESPN	11:00 a.m.	San Diego State	Central Michigan	48–11	18,823
Las Vegas Bowl	December 21	Sam Boyd Stadium • Whitney, NV	ABC	5:30 p.m.	No. 19 Boise State	Washington	7–38	34,197
Hawaii Bowl	December 24	Aloha Stadium • Honolulu, HI	ESPN	6:00 p.m.	Hawaii	BYU	38–34	21,582
Cheez-It Bowl	December 27	Chase Field • Phoenix, AZ	ESPN	8:15 p.m.	Air Force	Washington State	31–21	34,105
Arizona Bowl	December 31	Arizona Stadium • Tucson, AZ	CBSSN	2:30 p.m.	Wyoming	Georgia State	38–17	36,892
Famous Idaho Potato Bowl	January 3, 2020	Albertsons Stadium • Boise, ID	ESPN	1:30 p.m.	Nevada	Ohio	30-21	13,611

Rankings are from CFP rankings. All times Mountain Time Zone. Mountain West teams shown in bold.

=== Selection of teams ===
- Bowl eligible: Air Force, Boise State, Hawaii, Nevada, San Diego State, Utah State, Wyoming
- Bowl-ineligible: Colorado State, Fresno State, New Mexico, San Jose State, UNLV

== Mountain West records vs Other Conferences ==
2019–2020 records against non-conference foes:

Regular season

Power 5 Conferences	Record
ACC	1–1
Big Ten	1–2
Big 12	0–0
Pac-12	4–4
BYU/Notre Dame	1–3
SEC	3–2
Power 5 Total	10–12
Other FBS Conferences	Record
American	0–3
C-USA	2–1
Independents (Excluding BYU and Notre Dame)	6–1
MAC	0–1
Sun Belt	1–1
Other FBS Total	9–7
FCS Opponents	Record
Football Championship Subdivision	12–0
Total Non-Conference Record	31–19

Post Season

Power Conferences 5	Record
ACC	0–0
Big Ten	0–0
Big 12	0–0
Pac-12	1–1
BYU/Notre Dame	1–0
SEC	0–0
Power 5 Total	2–1
Other FBS Conferences	Record
American	0–0
C–USA	0–0
Independents (Excluding Notre Dame)	0–0
MAC	1–2
Sun Belt	1–0
Other FBS Total	2–2
Total Bowl Record	4–3

=== Mountain West vs Power Five matchups ===
This is a list of games the Mountain West has scheduled versus power conference teams (ACC, Big 10, Big 12, Pac-12, BYU/Notre Dame and SEC). All rankings are from the current AP Poll at the time of the game.

Date	Conference	Visitor	Home	Site	Score
August 24	Pac-12	Arizona	Hawaii	Aloha Stadium • Honolulu, HI	W 45–38
August 30	ACC	Utah State	Wake Forest	BB&T Field • Winston-Salem, NC	L 35–38
August 30	Big Ten	Purdue	Nevada	Mackay Stadium • Reno, NV	W 34–31
August 30	Pac-12	Colorado State	Colorado	Sports Authority Field • Denver, CO	L 31–52
August 31	ACC	Boise State	Florida State	Doak Campbell Stadium • Tallahassee, FL	W 36–31
August 31	SEC	Missouri	Wyoming	War Memorial Stadium • Laramie, WY	W 37–31
August 31	Pac-12	Fresno State	USC	Los Angeles Memorial Coliseum • Los Angeles, CA	L 23–31
September 7	Pac-12	Oregon State	Hawaii	Aloha Stadium • Honolulu, HI	W 31–28
September 7	Pac-12	San Diego State	UCLA	Rose Bowl • Pasadena, CA	W 23–14
September 7	Pac-12	Nevada	Oregon	Autzen Stadium • Eugene, OR	L 6–77
September 7	Big Ten	Minnesota	Fresno State	Bulldog Stadium • Fresno, CA	L 35–38 (2OT)
September 14	Pac-12	Air Force	Colorado	Folsom Field • Boulder, CO	W 30–23 (OT)
September 14	Independent	New Mexico	Notre Dame	Notre Dame Stadium • Notre Dame, IN	L 14–66
September 14	Big Ten	UNLV	Northwestern	Ryan Field • Evanston, IL	L 14–30
September 14	SEC	Colorado State	Arkansas	Donald W. Reynolds Razorback Stadium • Fayetteville, AR	L 34–55
September 14	Pac-12	Hawaii	Washington	Husky Stadium • Seattle, WA	L 20–52
September 21	SEC	San Jose State	Arkansas	Donald W. Reynolds Razorback Stadium • Fayetteville, AR	W 31–24
October 5	SEC	Utah State	No. 5 LSU	Tiger Stadium • Baton Rouge, LA	L 6–42
October 12	SEC	UNLV	Vanderbilt	Vanderbilt Stadium • Nashville, TN	W 34–10
October 19	Independent	Boise State	BYU	LaVell Edwards Stadium • Provo, UT	L 25–28
November 2	Independent	BYU	Utah State	Romney Stadium • Logan, UT	L 14–42
November 30	Independent	BYU	San Diego State	SDCCU Stadium • San Diego, CA	W 13–3

=== Mountain West vs Group of Five matchups ===
The following games include Mountain West teams competing against teams from the American, C-USA, MAC or Sun Belt.

Date	Conference	Visitor	Home	Site	Score
September 6	C–USA	Marshall	Boise State	Albertsons Stadium • Boise, ID	W 14–7
September 7	Sun Belt	Wyoming	Texas State	Bobcat Stadium • San Marcos, TX	W 23–14
September 7	American	Tulsa	San Jose State	CEFCU Stadium • San Jose, CA	L 16–34
September 7	Sun Belt	Arkansas State	UNLV	Sam Boyd Stadium • Whitney, NV	L 17–43
September 21	MAC	Toledo	Colorado State	Canvas Stadium • Fort Collins, CO	L 35–41
September 21	American	Wyoming	Tulsa	Skelly Field at H. A. Chapman Stadium • Tulsa, OK	L 21–24
September 21	C–USA	Nevada	UTEP	Sun Bowl • El Paso, TX	W 37–21
October 5	American	Air Force	Navy	Navy–Marine Corps Memorial Stadium • Annapolis, MD	L 25–34

=== Mountain West vs FBS independents matchups ===
The following games include Mountain West teams competing against FBS Independents, which includes Army, Liberty, New Mexico State, or UMass.

Date	Conference	Visitor	Home	Site	Score
September 14	Independents	San Diego State	New Mexico State	Aggie Memorial Stadium • Las Cruces, NM	W 31–10
September 21	Independents	New Mexico State	New Mexico	Dreamstyle Stadium • Albuquerque, NM	W 55–52
September 28	Independents	New Mexico	Liberty	Williams Stadium • Lynchburg, VA	L 10–17
September 28	Independents	Fresno State	New Mexico State	Aggie Memorial Stadium • Las Cruces, NM	W 30–17
October 26	Independents	San Jose State	Army	Michie Stadium • West Point, NY	W 34–29
November 2	Independents	Army	Air Force	Falcon Stadium • Colorado Springs, CO	W 17–13
November 30	Independents	Army	Hawaii	Aloha Stadium • Honolulu, HI	W 52-31

=== Mountain West vs FCS matchups ===
Date	Visitor	Home	Site	Score
August 29	Northern Colorado	San Jose State	CEFCU Stadium • San Jose, CA	W 35–18
August 31	Colgate	Air Force	Falcon Stadium • Colorado Springs, CO	W 48–7
August 31	Sam Houston State	New Mexico	Dreamstyle Stadium • Albuquerque, NM	W 39–31
August 31	Weber State	San Diego State	SDCCU Stadium • San Diego, CA	W 6–0
August 31	Southern Utah	UNLV	Sam Boyd Stadium • Whitney, NV	W 56–23
September 7	Western Illinois	Colorado State	Canvas Stadium • Fort Collins, CO	W 38–13
September 7	Stony Brook	Utah State	Maverik Stadium • Logan, UT	W 62-7
September 14	Idaho	Wyoming	War Memorial Stadium • Laramie, WY	W 21–16
September 14	Weber State	Nevada	Mackay Stadium • Reno, NV	W 19–13
September 14	Portland State	Boise State	Albertsons Stadium • Boise, ID	W 45–10
September 21	Sacramento State	Fresno State	Bulldog Stadium • Fresno, CA	W 34–20
September 21	Central Arkansas	Hawaii	Aloha Stadium • Honolulu, HI	W 35–16

== Awards and honors ==
=== Player of the week honors ===
Week	Offensive			Defensive			Special Teams		
Week	Player	Team	Position	Player	Team	Position	Player	Team	Position
Week 1 (Sept. 2)	Cedric Byrd	Hawaii	WR	Alijah Halliburton	Wyoming	S	Eric Sachse; Brandon Talton	Boise State; Nevada	PK
Week 2 (Sept. 9)	JoJo Ward	Hawaii	WR	Kyahva Tenzino	San Diego State	LB	Matt Araiza	San Diego State	PK
Week 3 (Sept. 16)	Donald Hammond III	Air Force	QB	Jeremy Fejedelem	Air Force	S	Brandon Talton (2)	Nevada	PK
Week 4 (Sept. 23)	Josh Love	San Jose State	QB	Bobby Brown II	San Jose State	DB	Dominik Eberle	Utah State	PK
Week 5 (Sept. 30)	Cole McDonald	Hawaii	QB	David Woodward	Utah State	LB	Savon Scarver	Utah State	WR/KR
Week 6 (Oct. 7)	Josh Love (2)	San Jose State	QB	Luq Barcoo	San Diego State	CB	Matt Mercurio	San Jose State	PK
Week 7 (Oct. 14)	Warren Jackson	Colorado State	WR	Javin White	UNLV	LB	Brandon Talton (3)	Nevada	PK
Week 8 (Oct. 21)	Mike Schmidt	Air Force	QB	Justin Rice	Fresno State	LB	Brandon Heicklen	San Diego State	P
Week 9 (Oct. 28)	Xazavian Valladay	Wyoming	RB	Logan Stewart	Colorado State	S	Matt Mercurio (2)	San Jose State	PK
Week 10 (Nov. 4)	George Holani	Boise State	RB	Evan Williams	Fresno State	DB	Avery Williams	Boise State	PR
Week 11 (Nov. 11)	Chevan Cordeiro	Hawaii	QB	Sam Hammond	Nevada	DE	Dominik Eberle (2)	Utah State	PK
Week 12 (Nov. 18)	Jaylon Henderson	Boise State	QB	Jake Ksiazek; Eric Munoz	Air Force; Utah State	DL; LB	Dominik Eberle (3)	Utah State	PK
Week 13 (Nov. 25)	Donald Hammond III (2)	Air Force	QB	Jericho Flowers	UNLV	CB	Brandon Heicklen (2)	San Diego State	P
Week 14 (Dec. 2)	Kenyon Oblad	UNLV	QB	Jeremy Fejedelem (2)	Air Force	DB	Brandon Heicklen (3)	San Diego State	P

=== Mountain West Individual Awards ===
The following individuals received postseason honors as voted by the Mountain West Conference football coaches at the end of the season

Award	Player	School
Offensive Player of the Year	Josh Love, Sr., QB	San José State
Defensive Player of the Year	Curtis Weaver, Jr., DE	Boise State
Special Teams Player of the Year	Avery Williams, Jr., Ret.	Boise State
Freshman of the Year	George Holani, RB	Boise State
Coach of the Year	Nick Rolovich	Hawaii

=== All-conference teams ===
Position	Player	Class	Team
First Team Offense
QB	Josh Love	Senior	San José State
WR	Warren Jackson	Junior	Colorado State
WR	Cedric Byrd II	Senior	Hawaii
WR	Tre Walker	Junior	San José State
RB	Charles Williams	Junior	UNLV
RB	Xazavian Valladay	Sophomore	Wyoming
TE	Trey McBride	Sophomore	Colorado State
OL	Scott Hattok	Senior	Air Force
OL	Nolan Laufenberg	Junior	Air Force
OL	Ezra Cleveland	Junior	Boise State
OL	John Molchon	Senior	Boise State
OL	Keith Ismael	Junior	San Diego State
First Team Defense
DL	Mosese Fifita	Senior	Air Force
DL	Curtis Weaver	Junior	Boise State
DL	Dom Peterson	Sophomore	Nevada
DL	Myles Cheatum	Senior	San Diego State
DL	Cameron Thomas	Freshman	San Diego State
LB	Justin Rice	Junior	Fresno State
LB	Mykal Walker	Senior	Fresno State
LB	Kyahva Tezino	Senior	San Diego State
LB	David Woodward	Junior	Utah State
LB	Logan Wilson	Senior	Wyoming
DB	Kekaula Kaniho	Junior	Boise State
DB	Jamal Hicks	Senior	Colorado State
DB	Luq Barcoo	Senior	San Diego State
DB	Alijah Halliburton	Senior	Wyoming
First Team Special Teams
PK	Dominik Eberle	Senior	Utah State
KR	Savon Scarver	Junior	Utah State
P	Ryan Stonehouse	Junior	Colorado State
PR	Avery Williams	Junior	Boise State

Position	Player	Class	Team
Second Team Offense
QB	Cole McDonald	Junior	Hawaii
WR	John Hightower	Senior	Boise State
WR	JoJo Ward	Senior	Hawaii
WR	Siaosi Mariner	Senior	Utah State
RB	George Holani	Freshman	Boise State
RB	Ronnie Rivers	Junior	Fresno State
TE	Parker Houston	Senior	San Diego State
OL	Connor Vikupitz	Senior	Air Force
OL	Garrett Larson	Senior	Boise State
OL	Ilm Manning	Sophomore	Hawaii
OL	Daishawn Dixon	Senior	San Diego State
OL	Keegan Cryder	Sophomore	Wyoming
Second Team Defense
DL	Chase Hatada	Senior	Boise State
DL	David Moa	Senior	Boise State
DL	Keshawn Banks	Sophomore	San Diego State
DL	Tipa Galeai	Senior	Utah State
LB	Kyle Johnson	Senior	Air Force
LB	Riley Whimpey	Junior	Boise State
LB	Ethan Aguayo	Senior	San José State
DB	Kekoa Nawahine	Senior	Boise State
DB	Jalen Walker	Junior	Boise State
DB	Tariq Thompson	Junior	San Diego State
DB	Jericho Flowers	Senior	UNLV
First Team Special Teams
PK	Brandon Talton	Freshman	Nevada
KR	John Hightower	Senior	Boise State
P	Tyson Dyer	Junior	New Mexico
PR	Austin Conway	Senior	Wyoming

==== All Conference Honorable Mentions ====
- Air Force: Milton Bugg III, Jr., DB; Jeremy Fejedelem, Sr., DB; Jordan Jackson, Jr., DL; Timothy Jackson, So., FB; Jake Koehnke, Sr., PK; Zan Lewis, Sr., DB; Geraud Sanders, Sr., WR; Kadin Remsberg, Jr., RB
- Boise State: John Bates, Jr., TE; Sonatane Lui, Sr., DL; Eric Quevedo, Sr., OL; Khalil Shakir, So., WR; Avery Williams, Jr., DB
- Colorado State: Anthony Hawkins, Sr., KR; Manny Jones, Jr., DL
- Fresno State: Kevin Atkins, Jr., DL; Blake Cusick, Sr., P; JuJu Hughes, Sr., DB
- Hawaii: Cortez Davis, Jr., DB; Rojesterman Farris II, Sr., DB; Solomon Matautia, Sr., LB; Kaimana Padello, Sr., DL; Gene Pryor, OL; Taaga Tuulima, Jr., OL; Blessman Ta'ala, So., DL
- Nevada: Daniel Brown, Sr., DB; Romeo Doubs, WR, PR; Gabriel Sewell, Sr., LB; Toa Taua, So., RB
- New Mexico: Ahmari Davis, Sr., RB; Alex Hart, Sr., LB; Teton Saltes, Jr., OL; Kyle Stapley, Jr., OL
- San Diego State: Matt Araiza, Fr., PK; William Dunkle, Fr., OL; Darren Hall, So., DB; Brandon Heicklen, Sr., P; Dwayne Johnson Jr., Jr., DB
- San Jose State: Bailey Gaither, Sr., WR; Troy Kowalski, Sr., OL; Matt Mercurio, Fr., PK; Jack Snyder, Jr., OL
- UNLV: Julio Garcia, Jr., OL; Rayshad Jackson, Sr., LB; Justin Polu, Sr., OL; Javin White, Sr., LB
- Utah State: Shaq Bond, Jr., DB; Gerold Bright, Sr., RB; Jordan Love, Jr., QB; Caleb Repp, Sr., TE; Christopher Unga, Sr., DL
- Wyoming: Tyler Hall, Sr., DB; Logan Harris, Jr., OL; Cassh Maluia, Sr., LB

=== All-Americans ===
The 2019 College Football All-America Teams are composed of the following College Football All-American first teams chosen by the following selector organizations: Associated Press (AP), Football Writers Association of America (FWAA), American Football Coaches Association (AFCA), Walter Camp Foundation (WCFF), The Sporting News (TSN), Sports Illustrated (SI), USA Today (USAT) ESPN, CBS Sports (CBS), FOX Sports (FOX) College Football News (CFN), Bleacher Report (BR), Scout.com, Phil Steele (PS), SB Nation (SB), Athlon Sports, Pro Football Focus (PFF) and Yahoo! Sports (Yahoo!).

Currently, the NCAA compiles consensus all-America teams in the sports of Division I-FBS football and Division I men's basketball using a point system computed from All-America teams named by coaches associations or media sources. The system consists of three points for a first-team honor, two points for second-team honor, and one point for third-team honor. Honorable mention and fourth team or lower recognitions are not accorded any points. Football consensus teams are compiled by position and the player accumulating the most points at each position is named first team consensus all-American. Currently, the NCAA recognizes All-Americans selected by the AP, AFCA, FWAA, TSN, and the WCFF to determine Consensus and Unanimous All-Americans. Any player named to the First Team by all five of the NCAA-recognized selectors is deemed a Unanimous All-American.

Position	Player	School	Selector
First Team All-Americans
DL, LB	Curtis Weaver	Boise State	CBS, WCFF, TSN, BR
LB	Logan Wilson	Wyoming	PFF
DB	Luq Barcoo	San Diego State	BR

Position	Player	School	Selector
Second Team All-Americans
DL, LB	Curtis Weaver	Boise State	AP, AFCA, FWAA, SI, USAT, PFF
LB	Logan Wilson	Wyoming	USAT
DB	Luq Barcoo	San Diego State	WCFF, FWAA
PR	Avery Williams	Boise State	PFF

Position	Player	School	Selector
Third Team All-Americans
LB	Logan Wilson	Wyoming	AP
DB	Luq Barcoo	San Diego State	AP
C	Keith Ismael	San Diego State	PFF

*AFCA All-America Team (AFCA)
*Walter Camp Football Foundation All-America Team (WCFF)
*Associated Press All-America Team (AP)
*The Sporting News All-America Team (TSN)
*Football Writers Association of America All-America Team (FWAA)
*Sports Illustrated All-America Team (SI)
*Bleacher Report All-America Team (BR)
*College Football News All-America Team (CFN)
*ESPN All-America Team (ESPN)
*CBS Sports All-America Team (CBS)
*Athlon Sports All-America Team (Athlon)

=== National award winners ===
2019 College Football Award Winners

== Home game attendance ==
Team	Stadium	Capacity	Game 1	Game 2	Game 3	Game 4	Game 5	Game 6	Game 7	Game 8	Total	Average	% of Capacity
Air Force	Falcon Stadium	46,692	33,101	24,786	22,544	19,248	41,401†	21,425	—	—	162,505	27,084	58.0%
Boise State	Albertsons Stadium	36,387	31,951	31,068	**36,498**	**36,902**†	33,018	31,492	23,561	—	224,490	32,070	88.1%
Colorado State	Canvas Stadium	41,200	24,453	24,464	29,767†	24,103	24,914	12,324	—	—	140,025	23,337	56.6%
Fresno State	Bulldog Stadium	41,031	34,790†	31,034	26,256	32,890	32,037	32,303	—	—	189,310	31,551	76.9%
Hawaii	Aloha Stadium	50,000	22,396	26,807†	23,465	23,757	22,058	19,858	24,911	26,256	189,508	23,688	47.8%
Nevada	Mackay Stadium	30,000	20,144†	14,174	15,137	15,311	15,631	16,683	—	—	97,080	16,180	53.9%
New Mexico	Dreamstyle Stadium	39,224	13,749	27,269†	15,393	12,617	13,844	11,611	—	—	94,483	15,747	40.1%
San Diego State	SDCCU Stadium	54,000	40,222†	27,367	28,758	27,973	26,876	28,180	—	—	179,376	29,896	55.4%
San Jose State	CEFCU Stadium	30,456	13,480	12,471	16,119	18,285	19,134†	12,835	—	—	92,324	15,387	50.5%
Utah State	Maverik Stadium	25,513	22,247	20,017	15,240	25,472†	16,364	18,315	—	—	117,655	19,609	76.9%
UNLV	Sam Boyd Stadium	35,500	17,421	18,742	24,681†	19,652	21,317	17,373	—	—	119,186	19,864	56.0%
Wyoming	War Memorial Stadium	29,181	26,037	28,814†	23,029	22,884	16,126	21,152	—	—	138,042	23,007	78.8%

Bold – Exceed capacity
†Season High

== NFL draft ==
The following list includes all Mountain West players who were drafted in the 2020 NFL draft.

Round #	Pick #	NFL team	Player	Position	College
1	26	Green Bay Packers	Jordan Love	QB	Utah State
2	58	Minnesota Vikings	Ezra Cleveland	OT	Boise State
3	65	Cincinnati Bengals	Logan Wilson	ILB	Wyoming
4	119	Atlanta Falcons	Mykal Walker	ILB	Fresno State
5	156	Washington Redskins	Keith Ismael	C	San Diego State
5	164	Miami Dolphins	Curtis Weaver	DE	Boise State
5	168	Philadelphia Eagles	John Hightower	WR	Boise State
6	181	Denver Broncos	Netane Muti	G	Fresno State
6	204	New England Patriots	Cassh Maluia	LB	Wyoming
7	224	Tennessee Titans	Cole McDonald	QB	Hawaii
