= 2018 Mountain West Conference football season =

- League: NCAA Division I Football Bowl Subdivision
- Sport: Football
- Duration: August 2018–January 2019
- Teams: 12
- TV partner(s): CBSSN, ABC, ESPN, ESPN2, ESPNU, CBS, Stadium, ATTSN

2019 NFL Draft
- Top draft pick: LB Jahlani Tavai, Hawaii
- Picked by: Detroit Lions, 43rd overall

Regular season
- Mountain Division champions: Boise State
- West Division champions: Fresno State

Championship Game
- Champions: Fresno State
- Runners-up: Boise State
- Finals MVP: RB Alexander Mattison, Boise State; DE Mykal Walker, Fresno State

Football seasons
- 2017 2019

2018 Mountain West Conference football standings
	Conf.			Overall
Team	W		L	W		L
Mountain Division
No. 23 Boise State x	7	–	1	10	–	3
No. 22 Utah State	7	–	1	11	–	2
Wyoming	4	–	4	6	–	6
Air Force	3	–	5	5	–	7
Colorado State	2	–	6	3	–	9
New Mexico	1	–	7	3	–	9
West Division
No. 18 Fresno State x$	7	–	1	12	–	2
Nevada	5	–	3	8	–	5
Hawaii	5	–	3	8	–	6
San Diego State	4	–	4	7	–	6
UNLV	2	–	6	4	–	8
San Jose State	1	–	7	1	–	11
Championship: Fresno State 19, Boise State 16 (OT)
$ – Conference champion; x – Division champion/co-champions; y – Championship game participant; Rankings from AP Poll

The 2018 Mountain West Conference football season, part of that year's NCAA Division I FBS football season, will be the 20th season of college football for the Mountain West Conference (MW). Since the 2012 12 teams have competed in the MW-football conference. The season will begin on August 25 and will end on November 24. Mountain West is a "Group of Five" conference under the College Football Playoff format along with the American Athletic Conference, Conference USA, the Mid-American Conference, and the Sun Belt Conference. The Mountain West Championship Game will be played on December 1. The entire schedule was released on March 1.

== Preseason ==
=== Mountain West Media ===
2018 Mountain West media days took place on July 24 and 25 at the Cosmopolitan.

=== Preseason Polls ===
Place	Mountain Division	West Division
1	Boise State (22) 132	Fresno State (16) 126
2	Wyoming 95	San Diego State (6) 116
3	Colorado State 82	UNLV 78
4	Utah State 78	Nevada 72
5	Air Force 52	Hawaii 45
6	New Mexico 23	San Jose State 25

- First place votes in parentheses

==== Preseason All–Mountain West team ====
Offense
Position	Player	Class	Team
QB	Brett Rypien**	SR.	Boise State
WR	KeeSean Johnson**	SR.	Fresno State
WR	McLane Mannix	SO.	Nevada
RB	Alexander Mattison	JR.	Boise State
RB	Lexington Thomas*	SR.	UNLV
OL	Ezra Cleveland	SO.	Boise State
OL	John Molchon	JR.	Boise State
OL	Aaron Jenkins	SR.	New Mexico
OL	Keith Ismael**	SO.	San Diego State
OL	Tyler Roemer**	SO.	San Diego State
TE	Dax Raymond	JR.	Utah State

Defense
Position	Player	Class	Team
DL	David Moa**	SR.	Boise State
DL	Curtis Weaver*	SO.	Boise State
DL	Youhanna Ghaifan*	JR.	Wyoming
DL	Carl Granderson*	DL	Wyoming
LB	Jeffrey Allison*	JR.	Fresno State
LB	Jahlani Tavai**	SR.	Hawaii
LB	Malik Reed	SR.	Nevada
DB	Tyler Horton*	SR.	Boise State
DB	Dameon Baber**	SR.	Nevada
DB	Tariq Thompson**	SO.	San Diego State
DB	Andrew Wingard*	SR.	Wyoming

Specialists
Position	Player	Class	Team
P	Ryan Stonehouse	SO.	Colorado State
PK	Dominik Eberle*	JR.	Utah State
KR/PR	Avery Williams**	SO.	Boise State

- Preseason Offensive Player of the Year:

Brett Rypien, SR., QB, Boise State

- Preseason Defensive Player of the Year:

Andrew Wingard, SR., DB, Wyoming

- Preseason Special Teams Player of the Year:

Avery Williams, SO., KR/PR, Boise State

(* – member of the 2017 All–Mountain West first team)

(** – member of the 2017 All–Mountain West second team)

== Coaches ==
NOTE: Stats shown are before the beginning of the season

Team	Head coach	Years at school	Overall record	Record at school	MW record
Air Force	Troy Calhoun	12	82–60	82–60	49–39
Boise State	Bryan Harsin	5	49–17	42–12	25–7
Colorado State	Mike Bobo	4	21–18	21–18	15–9
Fresno State	Jeff Tedford	2	92–61	10–4	7–1
Hawaii	Nick Rolovich	3	10–16	10–16	5–12
Nevada	Jay Norvell	2	3–9	3–9	3–5
New Mexico	Bob Davie	7	65–70	30–45	16–32
San Diego State	Rocky Long	8	129–98	64–29	42–13
San José State	Brent Brennan	2	2–11	2–11	1–8
UNLV	Tony Sanchez	4	12–24	12–24	9–15
Utah State	Matt Wells	6	34–32	34–32	23–17
Wyoming	Craig Bohl	5	126–61	22–29	15–17

== Rankings ==
Listed are the Mountain West teams who were ranked or received votes at some point during the season. Air Force, Colorado State, Nevada, New Mexico, San Jose State, UNLV, and Wyoming were never ranked or received any votes.

Legend
	Improvement in ranking
	Drop in ranking
	Not ranked previous week
RV	Received votes but were not ranked in Top 25 of poll

		Pre	Wk 1	Wk 2	Wk 3	Wk 4	Wk 5	Wk 6	Wk 7	Wk 8	Wk 9	Wk 10	Wk 11	Wk 12	Wk 13	Wk 14	Final
Boise State Broncos	AP	22	20	17	RV	RV	RV					RV	23	21	19	23	
Boise State Broncos	C	22	19	17	24	25	24	RV			RV	RV	24	22	20	24	
Boise State Broncos	CFP	Not released											25	23	22	25	
Fresno State Bulldogs	AP	RV	RV						RV	RV	20	16	RV	RV	25	19	
Fresno State Bulldogs	C	RV	RV		RV		RV	RV	RV	RV	23	17	RV	23	23	21	
Fresno State Bulldogs	CFP	Not released									23	23			25	21	
Hawaii Rainbow Warriors	AP		RV	RV				RV									
Hawaii Rainbow Warriors	C		RV	RV			RV	RV									
Hawaii Rainbow Warriors	CFP	Not released															
San Diego State Aztecs	AP				RV	RV	RV	RV	RV	RV	RV	RV					
San Diego State Aztecs	C	RV	RV		RV	RV	RV	RV	RV	RV	RV	RV	RV				
San Diego State Aztecs	CFP	Not released															
Utah State Aggies	AP							RV	RV	RV	18	14	14	14	RV	RV	
Utah State Aggies	C							RV	RV	RV	20	16	13	15	24	23	
Utah State Aggies	CFP	Not released											23	21			

== Schedule ==
=== Regular season ===
Index to colors and formatting
Mountain West member won
Mountain West member lost
Mountain West teams in **bold**

==== Week Zero ====
Date	Time	Visiting team	Home team	Site	TV	Result	Attendance	Ref.
August 25	5:30 p.m.	**Hawaii**	**Colorado State**	Canvas Stadium • Fort Collins, CO	CBSSN	**HAW** 43–34	31,007	
August 25	8:00 p.m.	**Wyoming**	New Mexico State	Aggie Memorial Stadium • Las Cruces, NM	ESPN2	**W** 29–7	20,322	
^{#}Rankings from AP Poll released prior to game. All times are in Mountain Time.

==== Week One ====
Date	Time	Visiting team	Home team	Site	TV	Result	Attendance	Ref.
August 30	8:00 p.m.	UC Davis	**San Jose State**	CEFCU Stadium • San Jose, CA		**L** 38–44	12,675	
August 31	4:00 p.m.	Colorado	**Colorado State**	Broncos Stadium at Mile High • Denver, CO (Rocky Mountain Showdown)	CBSSN	**L** 13–45	70,158	
August 31	5:00 p.m.	**Utah State**	No. 11 Michigan State	Spartan Stadium • East Lansing, MI	BTN	**L** 31–38	73,114	
August 31	7:00 p.m.	Portland State	**Nevada**	Mackay Stadium • Reno, NV		**W** 72–19	17,525	
August 31	7:00 p.m.	**San Diego State**	No. 13 Stanford	Stanford Stadium • Stanford, CA	FS1	**L** 10–31	40,913	
September 1	12:00 p.m.	Stony Brook	**Air Force**	Falcon Stadium • Colorado Springs, CO	Stadium	**W** 38–0	33,415	
September 1	1:30 p.m.	Washington State	**Wyoming**	War Memorial Stadium • Laramie, WY	CBSSN	**L** 19–41	24,131	
September 1	2:00 p.m.	**UNLV**	No. 15 USC	Los Angeles Memorial Coliseum • Los Angeles, CA	P12N	**L** 21–43	58,708	
September 1	4:00 p.m.	No. 22 **Boise State**	Troy	Veterans Memorial Stadium • Troy, AL	ESPNews	**W** 56–20	29,612	
September 1	6:00 p.m.	Incarnate Word	**New Mexico**	Dreamstyle Stadium • Albuquerque, NM	ESPN3	**W** 62–30	18,213	
September 1	8:00 p.m.	Idaho	**Fresno State**	Bulldog Stadium • Fresno, CA	Stadium	**W** 79–13	31,170	
September 1	9:00 p.m.	Navy	**Hawaii**	Aloha Stadium • Honolulu, HI	CBSSN	**W** 59–41	29,702	
^{#}Rankings from AP Poll released prior to game. All times are in Mountain Time.

Players of the week:

Offensive		Defensive		Special teams	
Player	Team	Player	Team	Player	Team
Cole McDonald	Hawaii	Tyler Horton	Boise State	Jaron Bryant	Fresno State

Boise State cornerback Tyler Horton was also named the Bronko Nagurski Trophy National Defensive Player of the Week.

==== Week Two ====
Date	Time	Visiting team	Home team	Site	TV	Result	Attendance	Ref.
September 8	10:00 a.m.	**New Mexico**	No. 5 Wisconsin	Camp Randall Stadium • Madison, WI	BTN	**L** 14–45	77,003	
September 8	10:00 a.m.	**Nevada**	Vanderbilt	Vanderbilt Stadium • Nashville, TN	SECN	**L** 10–41	25,676	
September 8	12:00 p.m.	**Air Force**	Florida Atlantic	FAU Stadium • Boca Raton, FL	CBSSN	**L** 27–33	24,101	
September 8	5:00 p.m.	**Wyoming**	Missouri	Faurot Field • Columbia, MO	ESPNU	**L** 13–40	50,820	
September 8	5:30 p.m.	Arkansas	**Colorado State**	Canvas Stadium • Fort Collins, CO	CBSSN	**W** 34–27	31,894	
September 8	5:30 p.m.	**Fresno State**	Minnesota	TCF Bank Stadium • Minneapolis, MN	FS1	**L** 14–21	38,280	
September 8	6:00 p.m.	New Mexico State	**Utah State**	Maverik Stadium • Logan, UT	Stadium	**W** 60–13	18,223	
September 8	7:00 p.m.	Sacramento State	**San Diego State**	SDCCU Stadium • San Diego, CA		**W** 28–14	45,755	
September 8	7:00 p.m.	UTEP	**UNLV**	Sam Boyd Stadium • Whitney, NV	ATTSN	**W** 52–24	14,122	
September 8	8:15 p.m.	Connecticut	No. 20 **Boise State**	Albertsons Stadium • Boise, ID	ESPNU	**W** 62–7	34,515	
September 8	9:00 p.m.	**San Jose State**	Washington State	Martin Stadium • Pullman, WA	P12N	**L** 0–31	26,141	
September 8	10:00 p.m.	Rice	**Hawaii**	Aloha Stadium • Honolulu	SPEC HI	**W** 43–29	23,112	
^{#}Rankings from AP Poll released prior to game. All times are in Mountain Time.

Players of the week:

Offensive		Defensive		Special teams	
Player	Team	Player	Team	Player	Team
Brett Rypien	Boise State	Aaron Wade	Utah State	Dominik Eberle	Utah State

==== Week Three ====
Date	Time	Visiting team	Home team	Site	TV	Result	Attendance	Ref.
September 13	6:00 p.m.	Tennessee Tech	**Utah State**	Maverik Stadium • Logan, UT	Stadium	**W** 73–12	15,011	
September 15	10:00 a.m.	**Hawaii**	Army	Michie Stadium • West Point, NY	CBSSN	**L** 21–28	31,133	
September 15	1:30 p.m.	No. 17 **Boise State**	No. 24 Oklahoma State	Boone Pickens Stadium • Stillwater, OK	ESPN	**L** 21–44	54,974	
September 15	2:00 p.m.	**Colorado State**	Florida	Ben Hill Griffin Stadium • Gainesville, FL	SECN	**L** 10–48	80,021	
September 15	2:00 p.m.	Wofford	**Wyoming**	War Memorial Stadium • Laramie, WY	Stadium	**W** 17–14	20,293	
September 15	3:00 p.m.	**San Jose State**	No. 20 Oregon	Autzen Stadium • Eugene, OR	P12N	**L** 22–35	50,049	
September 15	5:00 p.m.	Oregon State	**Nevada**	Mackay Stadium • Reno, NV	ESPNU	**W** 37–35	20,462	
September 15	6:00 p.m.	**New Mexico**	New Mexico State	Aggie Memorial Stadium • Las Cruces, NM (Rio Grande Rivalry)	ELVN	**W** 42–25	20,673	
September 15	8:00 p.m.	Prairie View A&M	**UNLV**	Sam Boyd Stadium • Whitney, NV		**W** 46–17	14,786	
September 15	8:30 p.m.	**Fresno State**	UCLA	Rose Bowl • Pasadena, CA	FS1	**W** 38–14	60,867	
September 15	8:30 p.m.	No. 23 Arizona State	**San Diego State**	SDCCU Stadium • San Diego, CA	CBSSN	**W** 28–21	34,641	
^{#}Rankings from AP Poll released prior to game. All times are in Mountain Time.

Players of the week:

Offensive		Defensive		Special teams	
Player	Team	Player	Team	Player	Team
Marcus McMaryion	Fresno State	Marcus Hayes	New Mexico	John Baron II	San Diego State

==== Week Four ====
Date	Time	Visiting team	Home team	Site	TV	Result	Attendance	Ref.
September 22	10:00 a.m.	**Nevada**	Toledo	Glass Bowl • Toledo, OH	CBSSN	**L** 44–63	23,675	
September 22	1:00 p.m.	Illinois State	**Colorado State**	Canvas Stadium • Fort Collins, CO	ATTSN	**L** 19–35	26,259	
September 22	5:00 p.m.	**UNLV**	Arkansas State	Centennial Bank Stadium • Jonesboro, AR	ESPN3	**L** 20–27	18,537	
September 22	8:30 p.m.	Eastern Michigan	**San Diego State**	SDCCU Stadium • San Diego, CA	CBSSN	**W** 23–20 ^{OT}	30,898	
September 22	8:15 p.m.	**Air Force**	**Utah State**	Maverik Stadium • Logan, UT	ESPN2	**USU** 42–32	22,720	
^{#}Rankings from AP Poll released prior to game. All times are in Mountain Time.

Players of the week:

Offensive		Defensive		Special teams	
Player	Team	Player	Team	Player	Team
Jordan Love	Utah State	Darren Hall	San Diego State	John Baron II	San Diego State

==== Week Five ====
Date	Time	Visiting team	Home team	Site	TV	Result	Attendance	Ref.
September 29	2:00 pm	**Nevada**	**Air Force**	Falcon Stadium • Colorado Springs, CO	ESPNews	**NEV** 28–25	23,707	
September 29	4:00 p.m.	Liberty	**New Mexico**	Dreamstyle Stadium • Albuquerque, NM		**L** 43–52	18,804	
September 29	5:00 p.m.	**Boise State**	**Wyoming**	War Memorial Stadium • Laramie, WY	CBSSN	**BSU** 34–14	22,271	
September 29	5:00 p.m.	**Hawaii**	**San Jose State**	CEFCU Stadium • San Jose, CA	Spectrum	**HAW** 44–41 ^{5OT}	16,363	
September 29	8:30 p.m.	Toledo	**Fresno State**	Bulldog Stadium • Fresno, CA	ESPNU	**W** 49–27	33,401	
^{#}Rankings from AP Poll released prior to game. All times are in Mountain Time.

Players of the week:

Offensive		Defensive		Special teams	
Player	Team	Player	Team	Player	Team
Marcus McMaryion	Fresno State	Mykal Walker	Fresno State	Ryan Meskell	Hawaii

==== Week Six ====
Date	Time	Visiting team	Home team	Site	TV	Result	Attendance	Ref.
October 5	7:00 p.m.	**Utah State**	BYU	LaVell Edwards Stadium • Provo, UT (Beehive Boot & The Old Wagon Wheel)	ESPN2	**W** 45–20	58,087	
October 6	1:30 p.m.	Navy	**Air Force**	Falcon Stadium • Colorado Springs, CO (Commander-in-Chief's Trophy)	CBSSN	**W** 35–7	40,175	
October 6	1:30 p.m.	**San Diego State**	**Boise State**	Albertsons Stadium • Boise, ID	ESPNU	**SDSU** 19–13	36,679	
October 6	2:00 p.m.	**New Mexico**	**UNLV**	Sam Boyd Stadium • Whitney, NV	ATTSN	**UNM** 50–14	18,949	
October 6	8:30 p.m.	**Colorado State**	**San Jose State**	CEFCU Stadium • San Jose, CA	CBSSN	**CSU** 42–30	13,802	
October 6	8:30 p.m.	**Fresno State**	**Nevada**	Mackay Stadium • Reno, NV	ESPNU	**FRES** 21–3	15,367	
October 6	10:00 p.m.	**Wyoming**	**Hawaii**	Aloha Stadium • Honolulu, HI	SPEC HI	**HAW** 17–13	23,907	
^{#}Rankings from AP Poll released prior to game. All times are in Mountain Time.

Players of the week:

Offensive		Defensive		Special teams	
Player	Team	Player	Team	Player	Team
Jordan Love	Utah State	Darren Hall	San Diego State	John Baron II	San Diego State

==== Week Seven ====
Date	Time	Visiting team	Home team	Site	TV	Result	Attendance	Ref.
October 12	7:00 p.m.	**Air Force**	**San Diego State**	SDCCU Stadium • San Diego, CA	CBSSN	**SDSU** 21–17	25,326	
October 13	1:30 p.m.	Army	**San Jose State**	CEFCU Stadium • San Jose, CA	ESPNU	**L** 3–52	15,627	
October 13	2:00 p.m.	**New Mexico**	**Colorado State**	Canvas Stadium • Fort Collins, CO	ATTSN	**CSU** 20–18	36,514	
October 13	2:00 p.m.	**UNLV**	**Utah State**	Maverik Stadium • Logan, UT	Stadium	**USU** 59–28	21,212	
October 13	8:15 p.m.	**Hawaii**	BYU	LaVell Edwards Stadium • Provo, UT	ESPN2	**L** 23–49	52,354	
October 13	8:30 p.m.	**Boise State**	**Nevada**	Mackay Stadium • Reno, NV (rivalry)	CBSSN	**BSU** 31–27	21,431	
October 13	8:30 p.m.	**Wyoming**	**Fresno State**	Bulldogs Stadium • Fresno, CA	ESPNU	**FRES** 27–3	28,501	
^{#}Rankings from AP Poll released prior to game. All times are in Mountain Time.

Players of the week:

Offensive		Defensive		Special teams	
Player	Team	Player	Team	Player	Team
Jordan Love	Utah State	Kyahva Tezino	San Diego State	Kaelin Himphill	San Diego State

==== Week Eight ====
Date	Time	Visiting team	Home team	Site	TV	Result	Attendance	Ref.
October 19	7:00 p.m.	Colorado State	Boise State	Albertsons Stadium • Boise, ID	ESPN2	**BSU** 56–28	32,299	
October 19	8:00 p.m.	Air Force	UNLV	Sam Boyd Stadium • Whitney, NV	CBSSN	**AFA** 41–35	17,881	
October 20	12:30 p.m.	Utah State	Wyoming	War Memorial Stadium • Laramie, WY (Bridger’s Battle)	ATTSN	**USU** 24–16	18,378	
October 20	5:30 p.m.	Fresno State	New Mexico	Dreamstyle Stadium • Albuquerque, NM	ESPNU	**FRES** 38–7	16,708	
October 20	8:30 p.m.	San Jose State	San Diego State	SDCCU Stadium • San Diego, CA	CBSSN	**SDSU** 16–13	30,451	
October 20	10:00 p.m.	Nevada	Hawaii	Aloha Stadium • Honolulu, HI	SPEC HI	**NEV** 40–22	24,475	
^{#}Rankings from AP Poll released prior to game. All times are in Mountain Time.

Players of the week:

Offensive		Defensive		Special teams	
Player	Team	Player	Team	Player	Team
Isaiah Sanders	Air Force	Korey Rush	Nevada	John Baron II	San Diego State

==== Week Nine ====
Date	Time	Visiting team	Home team	Site	TV	Result	Attendance	Ref.
October 26	8:00 p.m.	Wyoming	Colorado State	Canvas Stadium • Fort Collins, CO (The Border War)	CBSSN	**WYO** 34–21	32,125	
October 27	2:00 p.m.	New Mexico	Utah State	Maverik Stadium • Logan, UT	Stadium	**USU** 61–19	16,119	
October 27	4:30 p.m.	UNLV	San Jose State	CEFCU Stadium • San Jose, CA	ATTSN	**SJSU** 50–37	16,165	
October 27	5:00 p.m.	Boise State	Air Force	Falcon Stadium • Colorado Springs, CO	CBSSN	**BSU** 48–38	27,753	
October 27	8:30 p.m.	Hawaii	Fresno State	Bulldog Stadium • Fresno, CA (rivalry)	ESPN2	**FRES** 50–20	33,659	
October 27	8:30 p.m.	San Diego State	Nevada	Mackay Stadium • Reno, NV	ESPNU	**NEV** 28–24	14,545	
^{#}Rankings from AP Poll released prior to game. All times are in Mountain Time.

Players of the week:

Offensive		Defensive		Special teams	
Player	Team	Player	Team	Player	Team
Jordan Love	Utah State	Dakari Monroe	San Jose State	Quinton Conaway	Nevada

==== Week Ten ====
Date	Time	Visiting team	Home team	Site	TV	Result	Attendance	Ref.
November 3	10:00 a.m.	**Air Force**	Army	Michie Stadium • West Point, NY (Commander-in-Chief's Trophy)	CBSSN	**L** 14–17	38,502	
November 3	12:00 p.m.	**San Jose State**	**Wyoming**	War Memorial Stadium • Laramie, WY	ATTSN	**WYO** 24–9	13,238	
November 3	8:15 p.m.	BYU	**Boise State**	Albertsons Stadium • Boise, ID	ESPN2	**W** 21–16	35,241	
November 3	8:15 p.m.	**San Diego State**	**New Mexico**	Dreamstyle Stadium • Albuquerque, NM	ESPNU	**SDSU** 31–23	14,646	
November 3	8:30 p.m.	No. 20 **Fresno State**	**UNLV**	Sam Boyd Stadium • Whitney, NV	CBSSN	**FRES** 48–3	15,276	
November 3	10:00 p.m.	No. 18 **Utah State**	**Hawaii**	Aloha Stadium • Honolulu, HI	SPEC HI	**USU** 56–17	21,476	
^{#}Rankings from AP Poll released prior to game. All times are in Mountain Time.

Players of the week:

Offensive		Defensive		Special teams	
Player	Team	Player	Team	Player	Team
Darwin Thompson	Utah State	Kyahva Tezino	San Diego State	John Baron II	San Diego State

==== Week Eleven ====
Date	Time	Visiting team	Home team	Site	TV	Result	Attendance	Ref.
November 9	8:15 p.m.	No. 16 **Fresno State**	**Boise State**	Albertsons Stadium • Boise, ID (Battle for the Milk Can)	ESPN2	**BSU** 24–17	33,118	
November 10	1:30 p.m.	**New Mexico**	**Air Force**	Falcon Stadium • Colorado Springs, CO	CBSSN	**AFA** 42–24	23,723	
November 10	2:00 p.m.	**San Jose State**	No. 14 **Utah State**	Maverik Stadium • Logan, UT	Stadium	**USU** 62–24	19,017	
November 10	8:30 p.m.	**Colorado State**	**Nevada**	Mackay Stadium • Reno, NV	ESPNU	**NEV** 49–10	13,755	
November 10	8:30 p.m.	**UNLV**	**San Diego State**	SDCCU Stadium • San Diego, CA	ESPN2	**UNLV** 27–24	24,986	
^{#}Rankings from AP Poll released prior to game. All times are in Mountain Time.

Players of the week:

Offensive		Defensive		Special teams	
Player	Team	Player	Team	Player	Team
Jordan Love	Utah State	Jericho Flowers	UNLV	Tyson Dyer	New Mexico

==== Week Twelve ====
Date	Time	Visiting team	Home team	Site	TV	Result	Attendance	Ref.
November 16	7:00 p.m.	No. 23 **Boise State**	New Mexico	Dreamstyle Stadium • Albuquerque, NM	CBSSN	**BSU** 45–14	16,883	
November 17	12:00 p.m.	No. 14 **Utah State**	Colorado State	Canvas Stadium • Fort Collins, CO	ATTSN	**USU** 29–24	19,226	
November 17	2:00 p.m.	**Air Force**	Wyoming	War Memorial Stadium • Laramie, WY	ESPNews	**WYO** 35–27	14,996	
November 17	3:00 p.m.	**Nevada**	San Jose State	CEFCU Stadium • San Jose, CA	ESPN3	**NEV** 21–12	12,271	
November 17	8:30 p.m.	**San Diego State**	Fresno State	Bulldog Stadium • Fresno, CA (Battle for the Oil Can)	CBSSN	**FRES** 23–14	36,123	
November 17	9:00 p.m.	**UNLV**	Hawaii	Aloha Stadium • Honolulu, HI	SPEC HI	**HAW** 35–28	25,697	
^{#}Rankings from AP Poll released prior to game. All times are in Mountain Time.

Players of the week:

Offensive		Defensive		Special teams	
Player	Team	Player	Team	Player	Team
Tyler Vander Waal	Wyoming	Andrew Wingard	Wyoming	Dominik Eberle	Utah State

==== Week Thirteen ====
Date	Time	Visiting team	Home team	Site	TV	Result	Attendance	Ref.
November 22	1:30 p.m.	**Colorado State**	**Air Force**	Falcon Stadium • Colorado Springs, CO (rivalry)	CBSSN	**AFA** 27–19	17,432	
November 24	12:30 p.m.	**Wyoming**	**New Mexico**	Dreamstyle Stadium • Albuquerque, NM	ATTSN	**WYO** 31–3	14,269	
November 24	5:00 p.m.	**San Jose State**	**Fresno State**	Bulldog Stadium • Fresno, CA (Valley Cup)	ESPNU	**FRES** 31–13	26,162	
November 24	7:30 p.m.	**Nevada**	**UNLV**	Sam Boyd Stadium • Whitney, NV (Battle for the Fremont Cannon)	CBSSN	**UNLV** 34–29	19,921	
November 24	8:15 p.m.	No. 14 **Utah State**	No. 21 **Boise State**	Albertsons Stadium • Boise, ID	ESPN	**BSU** 33–24	35,960	
November 24	8:30 p.m.	**Hawaii**	**San Diego State**	SDCCU Stadium • San Diego, CA	ESPNU	**HAW** 31–30 ^{OT}	28,014	
^{#}Rankings from AP Poll released prior to game. All times are in Mountain Time.

Players of the week:

Offensive		Defensive		Special teams	
Player	Team	Player	Team	Player	Team
Alexander Mattison	Boise State	Javin White	UNLV	Cooper Rothe	Wyoming

==== Mountain West Championship Game ====
Date	Time	Visiting team	Home team	Site	TV	Result	Attendance	Ref.
December 1	5:45 p.m.	No. 25 **Fresno State**	No. 19 **Boise State**	Albertsons Stadium • Boise, ID	ESPN	**FRES** 19–16 ^{OT}	23,662	
^{#}Rankings from AP Poll released prior to game. All times are in Mountain Time.

== Postseason ==
=== Bowl games ===
Legend
Mountain West win
Mountain West loss

Bowl game	Date	Site	Television	Time (MST)	MW team	Opponent	Score	Attendance
New Mexico Bowl	December 15	Dreamstyle Stadium • Albuquerque, NM	ESPN	12:00 p.m.	Utah State	North Texas	52–13	25,387
Las Vegas Bowl	December 15	Sam Boyd Stadium • Whitney, NV	ESPN	1:30 p.m.	Fresno State	Arizona State	31–20	37,146
Frisco Bowl	December 19	Toyota Stadium • Frisco, TX	ESPN	6:00 p.m.	San Diego State	Ohio	0–27	11,029
Hawaii Bowl	December 22	Aloha Stadium • Honolulu, HI	ESPN	8:30 p.m.	Hawaii	Louisiana Tech	14–31	30,911
First Responder Bowl	December 26	Cotton Bowl • Dallas, TX	ESPN	11:30 a.m.	Boise State	Boston College	No contest†	
Arizona Bowl	December 29	Arizona Stadium • Tucson, AZ	CBSSN	11:15 a.m.	Nevada	Arkansas State	16–13 ^{OT}	32,368

†The First Responder bowl was delayed and ultimately canceled with 5:08 remaining in the 1st quarter with Boston College leading 7–0. The game was ruled a no contest.

== Records against FBS Conferences ==
=== Power Five conferences ===
Power 5 Conferences	Record
ACC	0–0
Big Ten	0–3
Big 12	0–1
Pac-12	3–6
SEC	1–3
Power 5 Total	4–13

=== Group of Five conferences ===
Group of 5 Conferences	Record
American	3–0
C-USA	2–1
MAC	2–1
Sun Belt	2–1
Independents	5–5
Group of 5 Total	14–8

=== FCS Subdivision ===
FCS Opponents	Record
Football Championship Subdivision	8–2

== Awards and honors ==
=== All-Conference teams ===
- Offensive Player of the Year: Brett Rypien, Sr., QB, Boise State
- Defensive Player of the Year: Jeff Allison, Jr., LB, Fresno State
- Special Teams Player of the Year: Cooper Rothe, Jr., K, Wyoming
- Freshman of the Year: Toa Taua, RB, Nevada
- Coach of the Year: Matt Wells, Utah State

Offense:

Pos.	Name	Yr.	School	Pos.	Name	Yr.	School
First Team				Second Team			
QB	Brett Rypien	Sr.	Boise State	QB	Jordan Love	So.	Utah State
WR	John Ursua	Jr.	Hawaii	WR	KeeSean Johnson	Sr.	Fresno State
WR	Preston Williams	Jr.	Colorado State	WR	Sean Modster	Sr.	Boise State
RB	Nico Evans	Sr.	Wyoming	RB	Lexington Thomas	Sr.	UNLV
RB	Alexander Mattison	Jr.	Boise State	RB	Darwin Thompson	Jr.	Utah State
TE	Josh Oliver	Sr.	San José State	TE	Jared Rice	Jr.	Fresno State
OL	Ezra Cleveland	So.	Boise State	OL	Micah St. Andrew	Sr.	Fresno State
OL	Keith Ismael	So.	San Diego State	OL	Aaron Jenkins	Sr.	New Mexico
OL	Quin Ficklin	Sr.	Utah State	OL	Ryan Pope	Sr.	San Diego State
OL	Christian Cronk	Sr.	Fresno State	OL	Roman Andrus	Sr.	Utah State
OL	John Molchon	Jr.	Boise State	OL	Griffin Landrum	Sr.	Air Force
PK	Cooper Rothe	Jr.	Wyoming	PK	John Baron II	Sr.	San Diego State
PR/KR	Savon Scarver	So.	Utah State	PR/KR	Marcus Hayes	Fr.	New Mexico

Defense:

Pos.	Name	Yr.	School	Pos.	Name	Yr.	School
First Team				Second Team			
DL	Curtis Weaver	So.	Boise State	DL	Carl Granderson	Sr.	Wyoming
DL	Mykal Walker	Jr.	Fresno State	DL	Jordan Jackson	So.	Air Force
DL	Jabril Frazier	Sr.	Boise State	DL	Kaimana Padello	Jr.	Hawaii
DL	Korey Rush	Sr.	Nevada	DL	Bryson Bridges	Sr.	San Jose State
LB	Kyahva Tezino	Jr.	San Diego State	LB	David Woodward	So	Utah State
LB	Jeff Allison	Jr.	Fresno State	LB	Josh Watson	Jr.	Colorado State
LB	Malik Reed	Sr.	Nevada	LB	Tipa Galeai	Jr.	Utah State
DB	Tyler Horton	Sr.	Boise State	DB	JuJu Hughes	Jr.	Fresno State
DB	Tank Kelly	Sr.	Fresno State	DB	Mike Bell	Jr.	Fresno State
DB	Dakari Monroe	Sr.	San José State	DB	Tariq Thompson	So.	San Diego State
DB	Andrew Wingard	Sr.	Wyoming	DB	Jontrell Rocquemore	Sr.	Utah State
P	Ryan Stonehouse	So.	Colorado State	P	Blake Cusick	Jr.	Fresno State

Honorable Mentions:

- Air Force: Jeremy Fejedelem, Jr., DB.
- Boise State: Durrant Miles, Sr., DL; Kekoa Nawahine, Jr., DB; Avery Williams, So, RS/DB.
- Colorado State: None
- Fresno State: Jaron Bryant, Jr., DB; Jasad Haynes, Jr, DL; George Helmuth, Sr., LB; Marcus McMaryion, Sr., QB.
- Hawai'i: Zeno Choi, Sr., DL; Rojesterman Farris II, Jr.; DB; Cole McDonald, So., QB; Jahlani Tavai, Sr., LB; Solo Vaipulu, Fr., OL.
- Nevada: Dameon Baber, Sr., DB; Daniel Brown, Jr., DB; Quinton Conaway, Jr., P; Sean Krepsz, Sr., OL; McLane Mannix, So., WR; Jake Nelson, Jr., OL Asauni Rufus, Sr., DB.
- New Mexico: Aaron Blackwell, Jr., DL; Tyson Dyer, So., P; Marcus Hayes, Fr., DB.
- San Diego State: Parker Baldwin, Sr., DB; Noble Hall, Sr., DL; Brandon Heicklen, Jr., P; Kahale Warring, Jr., TE; Juwan Washington, Jr., RB.
- San Jose State: Ethan Aguayo, Jr., LB; Thai Cottrell, Sr., RS; Bryce Crawford, Sr., P; Boogie Roberts, Sr., DL.
- UNLV: Nathan Jacobson, Sr., OL; Roger Mann, Sr., DL; Justin Polu, Jr., OL.
- Utah State: Adewale Adeoye, Sr., DL; Rob Castaneda, Sr., OL; Dominik Eberle, Jr., PK; Gaje Ferguson, Sr., DB; Fua Leilua, Jr., DL; Dax Raymond, Jr., TE; Christopher Unga, Jr., DL; DJ Williams, Jr., DB. Ron’Quavion Tarver, Sr., WR; Sean Taylor, Sr., OL.
- Wyoming: Tyler Hall, Jr., DB; Logan Wilson, Jr., LB.

== Home game attendance ==
Team	Stadium	Capacity	Game 1	Game 2	Game 3	Game 4	Game 5	Game 6	Game 7	Total	Average	% of Capacity
Air Force	Falcon Stadium	46,692	33,415	23,707	40,175 †	27,753	23,723	17,432		166,205	27,701	59.3%
Boise State	Albertsons Stadium	36,387	34,515	**36,679** †	32,299	35,241	33,118	35,960		207,812	34,635	95.2%
Colorado State	Canvas Stadium	41,200	31,007	31,894	26,259	36,514 †	32,125	19,226		177,025	29,504	71.6%
Fresno State	Bulldog Stadium	41,031	31,170	33,401	28,501	33,659	36,123 †	26,162		189,016	31,503	76.7%
Hawaii	Aloha Stadium	50,000	29,702 †	23,112	26,175	23,907	24,475	21,476	25,697	174,544	24,935	49.9%
Nevada	Mackay Stadium	30,000	17,525	20,462	15,367	21,431 †	14,545	13,755		103,085	17,180	57.3%
New Mexico	Dreamstyle Stadium	39,224	18,213	18,804 †	16,708	14,646	16,883	14,269		99,523	16,587	42.3%
San Diego State	SDCCU Stadium	54,000	45,755 †	34,641	30,898	25,326	30,451	24,986	28,014	220,071	31,439	58.2%
San Jose State	CEFCU Stadium	30,456	12,675	16,363 †	13,802	16,165	12,271			71,276	14,255	46.8%
Utah State	Maverik Stadium	25,513	18,223	15,011	22,720 †	21,212	16,119	19,017		112,302	18,717	73.4%
UNLV	Sam Boyd Stadium	35,500	14,122	14,786	18,949	17,881	15,276	19,921 †		100,935	16,823	47.4%
Wyoming	War Memorial Stadium	29,181	24,131 †	20,293	22,271	18,378	13,238	14,996		113,307	18,885	64.7%

Bold – Exceed capacity
†Season High
