= Ezra Cleveland =

American football player (born 1998)

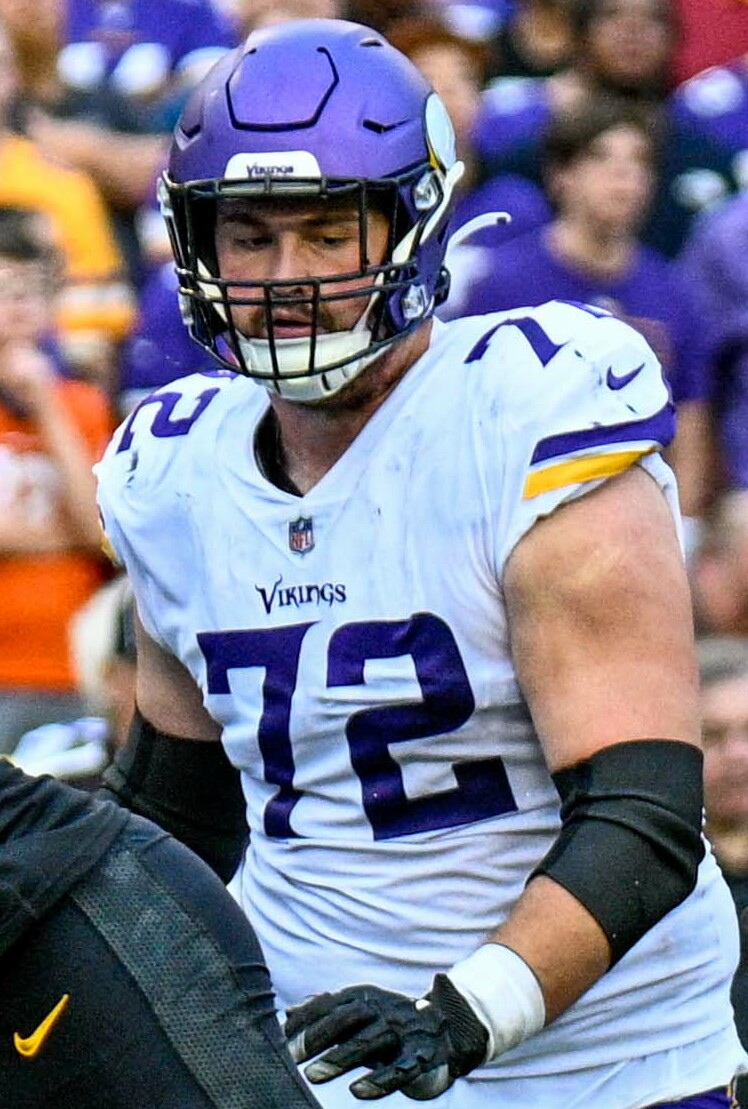
- Cleveland with the Minnesota Vikings in 2022

No. 76 – Jacksonville Jaguars
- Position: Guard
- Roster status: Active

Personal information
- Born: May 8, 1998 (age 28); Spanaway, Washington, U.S.
- Listed height: 6 ft 6 in (1.98 m)
- Listed weight: 312 lb (142 kg)

Career information
- High school: Bethel (Spanaway)
- College: Boise State (2016–2019)
- NFL draft: 2020: 2nd round, 58th overall pick

Career history
- Minnesota Vikings (2020–2023); Jacksonville Jaguars (2023–present)

Awards and highlights
- 2× First-team All-MW (2018, 2019)

Career NFL statistics as of Week 8, 2026
- Games played: 100
- Games started: 92
- Stats at Pro Football Reference

Ezra Cleveland (born May 8, 1998) is an American professional football guard for the Jacksonville Jaguars of the National Football League (NFL). He played college football for the Boise State Broncos and was drafted by the Minnesota Vikings in the second round of the 2020 NFL draft.

== Early life ==
Cleveland attended Bethel High School in Spanaway, Washington. He committed to Boise State University to play college football.

== College career ==
Cleveland played at Boise State from 2016 to 2019. After redshirting his first year in 2016, he became a starter in 2017. During his career he started 40 games. After his junior season in 2019, Cleveland entered the 2020 NFL draft.

== Professional career ==
Pre-draft measurables
Height	Weight	Arm length	Hand span	Wingspan	40-yard dash	10-yard split	20-yard split	20-yard shuttle	Three-cone drill	Vertical jump	Broad jump	Bench press	Wonderlic
6 ft 6 in (1.98 m)	311 lb (141 kg)	33 3/8 in (0.85 m)	9 in (0.23 m)	6 ft 8 3/8 in (2.04 m)	4.93 s	1.73 s	2.90 s	4.46 s	7.26 s	30.0 in (0.76 m)	9 ft 3 in (2.82 m)	30 reps	30
All values from NFL Combine

=== Minnesota Vikings ===
Cleveland was drafted by the Minnesota Vikings in the second round, 58th overall, in the 2020 NFL Draft. After beginning the season as a backup, Cleveland was named the starting right guard in Week 6 as a rookie, and started nine games.

In 2021, Cleveland was named the Vikings starting left guard, and started every game that season and in 2022. In 2023, he returned as the starting left guard and started the first six games.

=== Jacksonville Jaguars ===
On October 31, 2023, Cleveland was traded to the Jacksonville Jaguars in exchange for a sixth-round pick of the 2024 NFL draft.

On March 8, 2024, Cleveland signed a three-year contract extension with the Jaguars.

== Personal life ==
Cleveland was born 3 weeks early at 11 pounds.
