= Hanford Joint Union High School District =

School district in California, United States

Coordinates: 36°19′39″N 119°39′26″W

Hanford High School
- 120 E. Grangeville Blvd. Hanford, Ca. 93230

Information
- Type: Public
- Established: 1892; 134 years ago
- Principal: Darin Parson
- Enrollment: 1462
- Colors: Red and black
- Nickname: Bullpups

Hanford West High School
- 1150 W Lacey Blvd., Hanford, CA, 93230

Information
- Type: Public
- Established: 1998; 28 years ago
- Principal: Katy Culver
- Enrollment: 1423
- Colors: Blue and silver
- Nickname: Huskies

Sierra Pacific High School
- 1259 North 13th Avenue Hanford, Ca 93230

Information
- Type: Public
- Established: 2009; 17 years ago
- Principal: Jamie Rodgers
- Enrollment: 750
- Colors: Green and gold
- Nickname: Golden Bears
- Website: http://www.hjuhsd.k12.ca.us/sphs.htm

The Hanford Joint Union High School District (HJUHSD) serves the northwestern portion of Kings County, California. The schools are located in Hanford, the county seat. HJUHSD in Hanford consists of a total of 3,522 students from Hanford High School, Hanford West High School, Earl F. Johnson Continuation School, and Hanford Adult School. An arts high school, Sierra Pacific High School, opened on August 13, 2009 with 217 freshman.

Hanford High School and Hanford West High School each serve approximately 1,700 students. Earl F. Johnson High School serves about 250 students. Hanford Adult School serves a wide variety of students through its many and varied programs. HJUHSD students attend Hanford High School, Hanford West High School or Sierra Pacific High School based on their home address. These attendance areas were created with input from parents and other community members to create neighborhood schools and to balance student population between the schools.

== History ==
Hanford High School held its first classes in 1892 with one teacher, W. S. Cranmer, and an average enrollment of fourteen. In May, 1895, Hanford High School celebrated its first graduation.

Originally, the high school was located in the back of a local bank in Downtown Hanford. When more room was needed, classes were moved to a house on Elm Street before the school found its final home on Grangeville and Douty streets.

Funded by a 1919 bond measure for $350,000 and a $30,000 sale of school property, Hanford High's “Main Building” on Grangeville Boulevard was opened in 1921 and would be the school's home for more than 50 years. In 1952, a new cafeteria, auto shop and metal shop were added to the school, followed by new classrooms and other facilities in 1959.

Around 1940, the student body broke the 1,000 mark. Just over 20 years later, the school population had grown to the point that a separate facility was needed.

In November 1962, voters approved a $2.5 million bond issue to build a second campus. Land was purchased on West Lacey Boulevard and construction of “West Campus” began in 1963. It opened in 1964 to freshmen, and by 1968, 1,250 9th and 10th graders were enrolled. By 1994, both campuses were serving all four grades.

In 1970, Earl F. Johnson Continuation High School - named for a long-time educator who died in 1967 - was built at the north end of the Hanford High School East Campus.

In 1975, the community bid a sad farewell to historic Main Hall at the East Campus when it was demolished because it did not meet earthquake and education codes. In 1978, the district celebrated the opening of the replacement administration and library building. It was joined by a new auditorium in 1981 (later named the Stratton L. Tarvin Presentation Center for the Performing Arts in honor of a long-time administrator).

In 1980, Hanford Adult School was built on Campus Drive. In 1994, Earl F. Johnson High School was moved a few blocks south on Douty Street to a former elementary school. A $1 million modernization in 2002 expanded classroom space there.

In 1997, the district began its biggest construction project in many years: A $18 million local bond and matching state grants funded the construction of classrooms, labs, a library, a performing arts building, an event center and more to transform West Campus into Hanford West High, an independent school.

The 2001-2002 school year marked an important milestone for the 100+ year old district: Four independent high school graduations. Hanford West High's first graduating class numbered 291. Hanford High graduated 342; Earl F. Johnson had 21 graduates and Hanford Adult school gave out 41 high school diplomas.

On August 13, 2009, a third comprehensive, state-of-the-art high school called Sierra Pacific High School opened with 217 freshmen. Phase two of Sierra Pacific High will include additional buildings, including an administration building, a second academic building, a wrestling room, a pool and aquatics center, maintenance facilities, and a library and media center according to student growth and the need. Sierra Pacific High School was built because the two existing comprehensive high schools were over their enrollment capacities. Hanford High School and Hanford West High School are each built to hold about 1,700 students, but the student population at each was approaching 2,000 students. The Board of the Hanford Joint Union High School believes it is in the best interest of all students to keep high school enrollment at or below 1,700 students each. Studies have shown that this is a size that is big enough to allow for a variety of quality academic and extra-curricular activities, but small enough to allow for the personal interactions that help drive student success. No plans have been made to build any more high schools in the near future in Hanford, but as the city continues to grow to an estimated 70,177 residents by 2020, Hanford Joint Union High School District will continue to plan ahead to best serve all students.

== Academics ==
Hanford High School, Hanford West High School, and Sierra Pacific High School are comprehensive high schools offering college preparatory academics and extra-curricular activities. Earl F. Johnson Continuation High School is a smaller school designed to serve students who are at risk of not succeeding in the comprehensive setting. Hanford Adult School provides a variety of adult education opportunities for the community, including vocational training, a nursing education program and English-as-a-second-language courses.

== Notable alumni ==
- Lori Chavez-DeRemer, 1986, member of the United States House of Representatives from Oregon's 5th congressional district.
- Gordon W. Duffy, optometrist and member of the California State Assembly
- Tyler Henry, self-proclaimed clairvoyant medium, reality TV star
- JuJu Hughes, NFL player
- Chad Mendes, three-time HS wrestling All-American; two-time NCAA wrestling All-American for Cal Poly; retired professional mixed martial artist, former UFC title challenger
- Slim Pickens, 1936, actor, rodeo clown; appeared in Dr. Strangelove, Blazing Saddles
- J. G. Quintel, 2000, animator and creator of Regular Show and Close Enough
- James Rainwater, 1935, co-winner of the 1975 Nobel Prize for Physics
- David Valadao, 1995, member of the United States House of Representatives from California's 21st congressional district.
- Jan-Michael Vincent, 1963, actor, star of TV's Airwolf.
