= Curtis Weaver =

American football player (born 1998)

No. 59
- Position: Linebacker

Personal information
- Born: August 3, 1998 (age 28); Long Beach, California, U.S.
- Listed height: 6 ft 2 in (1.88 m)
- Listed weight: 265 lb (120 kg)

Career information
- High school: St. Anthony (Long Beach)
- College: Boise State (2016–2019)
- NFL draft: 2020: 5th round, 164th overall pick

Career history
- Miami Dolphins (2020)*; Cleveland Browns (2020–2022); Minnesota Vikings (2023)*; Birmingham Stallions (2024)*; Ottawa Redblacks (2024)*
- * Offseason or practice squad member only

Awards and highlights
- MW Defensive Player of the Year (2019); 2× First-team All-MW (2018, 2019)

Career NFL statistics
- Total tackles: 1
- Stats at Pro Football Reference

Curtis Weaver (born August 3, 1998) is an American former professional football player who was a linebacker for the Cleveland Browns of the National Football League (NFL). He played college football for the Boise State Broncos.

== Early life ==
Weaver was born on August 3, 1998, in Long Beach, California, to a mother of Filipino descent. He attended St. Anthony High School in Long Beach, California.

== College career ==
After redshirting his first year at Boise State University in 2016, Weaver played in all 14 games in 2017, recording 33 tackles, 11 sacks and one interception. As a redshirt sophomore in 2018, he had 43 tackles and 9.5 sacks. During his redshirt junior year in 2019, he set the Mountain West Conference record for career sacks. After this season, Weaver announced that he would forgo his final year of eligibility and enter the 2020 NFL draft.

== Professional career ==
Pre-draft measurables
Height	Weight	Arm length	Hand span	20-yard shuttle	Three-cone drill	Vertical jump	Broad jump
6 ft 2 3/8 in (1.89 m)	265 lb (120 kg)	32 3/8 in (0.82 m)	10 in (0.25 m)	4.27 s	7.00 s	32.5 in (0.83 m)	9 ft 8 in (2.95 m)
All values from NFL Combine

=== Miami Dolphins ===
Weaver was selected by the Miami Dolphins in the fifth round (164th overall) of the 2020 NFL draft. He was waived/injured by the team on August 24, 2020.

=== Cleveland Browns ===
Weaver was claimed off waivers by the Cleveland Browns on August 25, 2020. The Browns placed Weaver on injured reserve on August 27, 2020.

Weaver was waived by the Browns on August 31, 2021. Weaver was re-signed to the Browns' practice squad on September 1, 2021. Weaver was elevated to the Browns' active roster as a COVID-19 replacement player on December 24, 2021. Weaver made his NFL debut on January 9, 2022, against the Cincinnati Bengals, logging a tackle in the 21–16 victory. The Browns re-signed Weaver to a reserve/futures contract on January 10, 2022. He was waived by the Browns on August 29, 2022. He was re-signed to the practice squad on September 27, 2022. He was released on October 4, 2022.

=== Minnesota Vikings ===
On January 18, 2023, Weaver signed a reserve/future contract with the Minnesota Vikings. He was waived on August 21, 2023.

=== Birmingham Stallions ===
On October 6, 2023, Weaver signed with the Birmingham Stallions of the United States Football League (USFL). He was released on March 10, 2024.

=== Ottawa Redblacks ===
On April 3, 2024, Weaver signed with the Ottawa Redblacks of the Canadian Football League (CFL). He was listed as a defensive lineman with the Redblacks. He retired on May 8, 2024.
