= Keith Ismael =

American football player (born 1998)

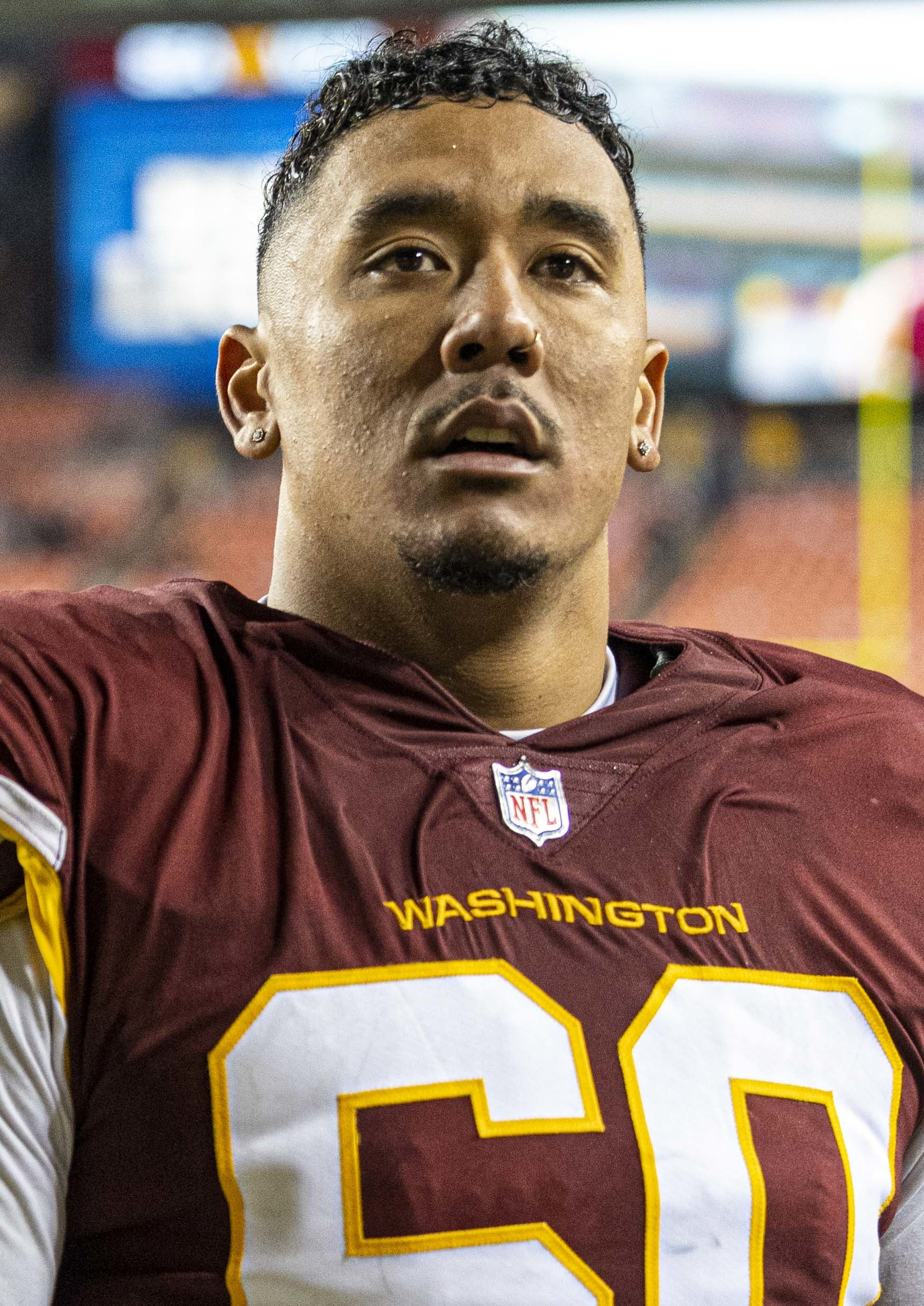
- Ismael with the Washington Football Team in 2021

Profile
- Position: Center

Personal information
- Born: July 25, 1998 (age 28); San Francisco, California, U.S.
- Listed height: 6 ft 3 in (1.91 m)
- Listed weight: 309 lb (140 kg)

Career information
- High school: Sacred Heart Cathedral (San Francisco)
- College: San Diego State (2016–2019)
- NFL draft: 2020: 5th round, 156th overall pick

Career history
- Washington Football Team / Commanders (2020–2021); San Francisco 49ers (2022–2023)*; Arizona Cardinals (2023–2024)
- * Offseason or practice squad member only

Awards and highlights
- 2× first-team All-Mountain West (2018, 2019); Second-team All-Mountain West (2017)

Career NFL statistics as of 2024
- Games played: 31
- Games started: 5
- Stats at Pro Football Reference

Keith Edward Ismael (born July 25, 1998) is an American professional football center. He has played in the National Football League (NFL) for the Washington Commanders and Arizona Cardinals. He played college football for the San Diego State Aztecs and was selected in the fifth round of the 2020 NFL draft by the team then known as the Washington Redskins.

== Early life ==
Ismael was born on July 25, 1998, in San Francisco, California, into a family of football players. His father, George Ismael, was a center for the Florida A&M Rattlers; his uncle, Tavita Pritchard, was a quarterback for the Stanford Cardinal and is currently the quarterbacks coach for the Washington Commanders; and his other uncle, Wilson Faumuina, played five seasons in the NFL.

Growing up, Ismael played baseball, basketball, soccer, and also swam. It wasn’t until seventh grade that his father allowed him to play football, wanting to ensure that he understood the sport, recognized the dedication required to succeed, and had a genuine passion for it. He attended Sacred Heart Cathedral Preparatory in San Francisco, where he played football and lacrosse.

== College career ==
A two-star recruit, Ismael committed to San Diego State over offers from Air Force, Army, Colorado State, Eastern Washington, Hawaii, Montana, San Jose State, UC Davis, and Utah State. He was a three-year starter at San Diego State. He was named second-team All-Mountain West Conference as a freshman and to the first-team as a sophomore and as a junior. Following the 2019 season, he announced he would be forgoing his senior season by entering the 2020 NFL draft.

== Professional career ==
Pre-draft measurables
Height	Weight	Arm length	Hand span	40-yard dash	10-yard split	20-yard split	20-yard shuttle	Three-cone drill	Vertical jump	Broad jump
6 ft 2 7/8 in (1.90 m)	309 lb (140 kg)	32 1/4 in (0.82 m)	10 in (0.25 m)	5.34 s	1.79 s	3.01 s	4.65 s	8.14 s	32.0 in (0.81 m)	9 ft 0 in (2.74 m)
All values from NFL Combine

=== Washington Football Team / Commanders ===
Ismael was selected by the Washington Football Team in the fifth round (156th overall) of the 2020 NFL Draft, in which they took Ismael with one of the two picks they acquired in a trade that sent Trent Williams to the San Francisco 49ers. He signed his four-year rookie contract on July 22, 2020. Ismael was released on August 31, 2021, and re-signed to the practice squad the following day. He was promoted to the active roster on November 4. In the Week 12 win against the Seattle Seahawks, Ismael took over at center after starter Wes Schweitzer left the game after suffering an ankle injury. The following week, Ismael made his first career start against the Las Vegas Raiders which made him the fourth starting center for the team in the 2021 season.

On March 16, 2022, the team placed an exclusive rights free agent tender on Ismael, which he signed on April 20. He was placed on injured reserve as part of finalizing the 53-man roster, but released with an injury settlement on September 5, 2022.

=== San Francisco 49ers ===
On September 13, 2022, Ismael signed with the practice squad of the San Francisco 49ers. He signed a reserve/future contract on January 31, 2023.

On August 29, 2023, Ismael was waived by the 49ers.

=== Arizona Cardinals ===
On August 30, 2023, Ismael was claimed off waivers by the Arizona Cardinals. He played in 13 games for the Cardinals in 2023.

Ismael was waived by the Cardinals on August 27, 2024, and re-signed to the practice squad. He was released by Arizona on December 10.

== Personal life ==
Ismael is of African American, Filipino, Samoan, and Native American descent.
