= Logan Wilson =

American football player (born 1996)

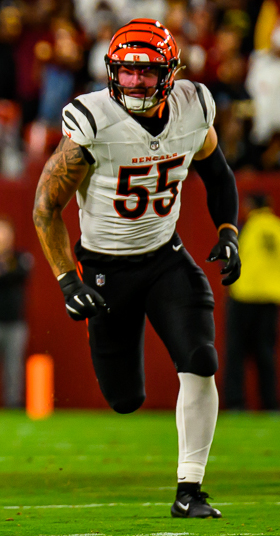
- Wilson with the Cincinnati Bengals in 2025

No. 55
- Position: Linebacker

Personal information
- Born: July 8, 1996 (age 30); Casper, Wyoming, U.S.
- Listed height: 6 ft 2 in (1.88 m)
- Listed weight: 245 lb (111 kg)

Career information
- High school: Natrona County (Casper)
- College: Wyoming (2015–2019)
- NFL draft: 2020: 3rd round, 65th overall pick

Career history
- Cincinnati Bengals (2020–2025); Dallas Cowboys (2025)

Awards and highlights
- MW Freshman of the Year (2016); First-team All-MW (2019); Second-team All-MW (2017)

Career NFL statistics
- Total tackles: 565
- Sacks: 5.5
- Forced fumbles: 7
- Pass deflections: 26
- Interceptions: 11
- Stats at Pro Football Reference

Logan Wilson (born July 8, 1996) is an American former professional football player who was a linebacker for six seasons in the National Football League (NFL). He played college football for the Wyoming Cowboys and was selected by the Cincinnati Bengals in the third round of the 2020 NFL draft. He also played for the Dallas Cowboys.

== Early life ==
Wilson grew up in Casper, Wyoming, and attended Natrona County High School, where he played defensive back, wide receiver, placekicker and punter on the football team. He was named first-team All-State as a placekicker as a sophomore and as a junior and at safety, wide receiver and punter as a junior. As a senior, Wilson recorded six interceptions and five passes broken up on defense, 29 catches for 493 yards and seven touchdowns on offense and was again named first-team All-State at safety, wide receiver and punter and helped lead the Mustangs to a 12-0 record and a state title. He committed to play college football at Wyoming with his only other scholarship offer being Weber State.

== College career ==
Wilson redshirted his true freshman season. As a redshirt freshman, Wilson made 94 tackles, 7.5 tackles for loss and three sacks with seven passes defended, three interceptions with one returned for a touchdown, a forced fumble and three fumble recoveries with one returned for a touchdown and was named the Mountain West Conference Freshman of the Year. Wilson posted 119 tackles, eight tackles for loss, a sack, two forced fumbles and a fumble recovery with an interception and two passes defended in his redshirt sophomore season and was named honorable mention All-Mountain West. He was again named honorable mention All-Mountain West as a redshirt junior after making 103 tackles with two sacks and 11 tackles for loss while breaking up four passes with two interceptions. As a senior, Wilson made 105 tackles with 8.5 tackles for loss and a sack with four interceptions (one returned for a touchdown), 11 passes broken up and a forced fumble and was named first-team All-Mountain West and a second-team All-American by USA Today. Wilson finished his collegiate career with 421 tackles (fourth-most in school history), 35 tackles for loss and seven sacks with 24 passes defended, ten interceptions, four forced fumbles, four fumbles recovered and three defensive touchdowns.

== Professional career ==
Pre-draft measurables
Height	Weight	Arm length	Hand span	Wingspan	40-yard dash	10-yard split	20-yard split	20-yard shuttle	Three-cone drill	Vertical jump	Broad jump	Bench press
6 ft 2 1/8 in (1.88 m)	241 lb (109 kg)	32 3/8 in (0.82 m)	9 1/2 in (0.24 m)	6 ft 4 5/8 in (1.95 m)	4.63 s	1.60 s	2.70 s	4.27 s	7.07 s	32.0 in (0.81 m)	10 ft 1 in (3.07 m)	21 reps
All values from NFL Combine

=== Cincinnati Bengals ===
==== 2020 ====
Wilson was selected by the Cincinnati Bengals with the 65th pick in the third round of the 2020 NFL draft. He made his debut in the opening game of 2020, recording two tackles as a reserve linebacker against the Los Angeles Chargers. In Week 3 against the Philadelphia Eagles, Wilson recorded his first career interception off a pass thrown by Carson Wentz during the 23–23 tie game. In Week 8 against the Tennessee Titans, Wilson recorded his first career sack on Ryan Tannehill during the 31–20 win.

==== 2021 ====
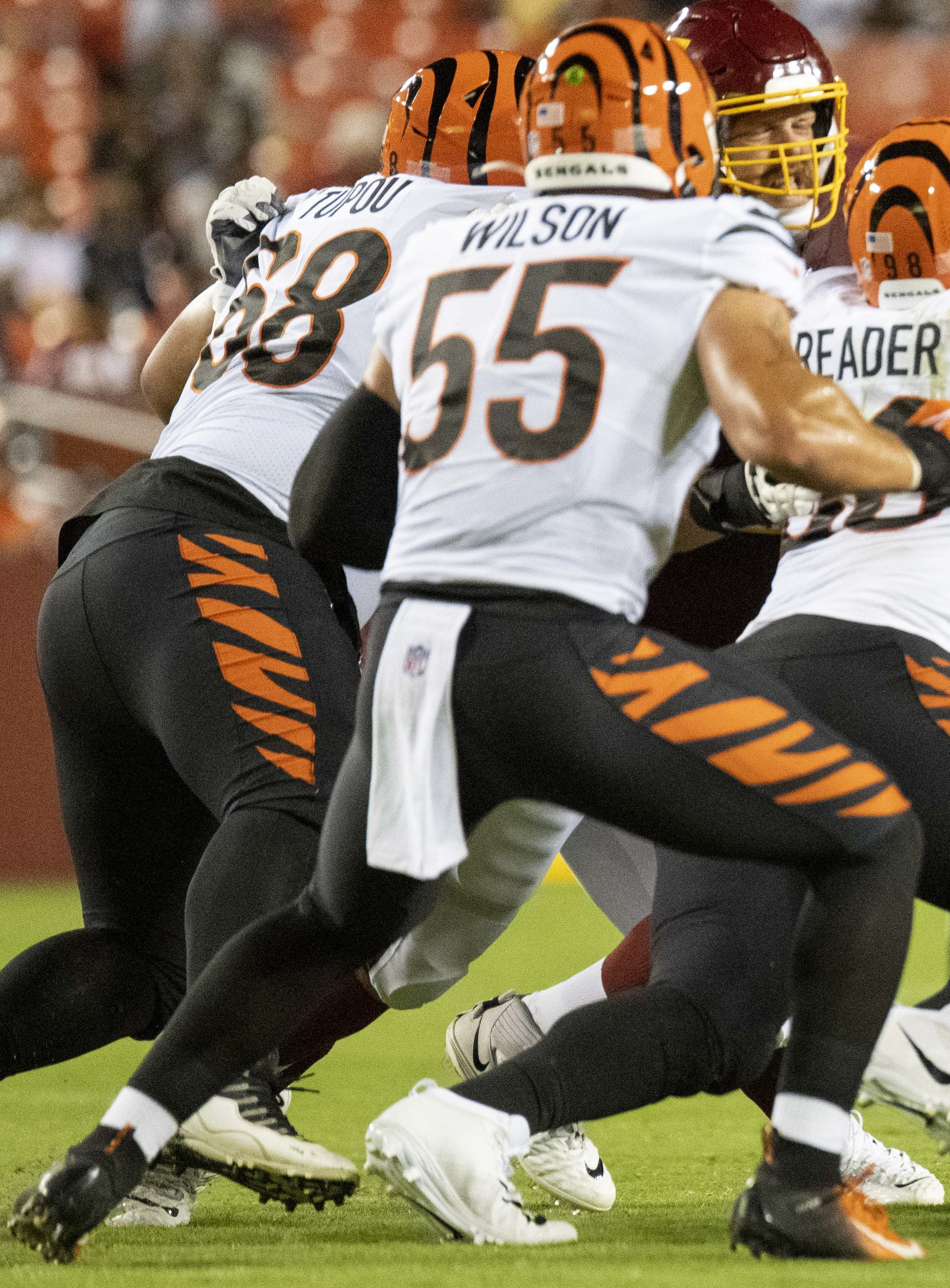
Wilson with the Bengals in 2021

Wilson was named the starting middle linebacker for the Bengals heading into the 2021 season. In Week 2 against the Chicago Bears, Wilson had his first interception of the season against Bears rookie quarterback Justin Fields in a 20-17 loss at Soldier Field. On September 26, 2021, Wilson intercepted Pittsburgh Steelers quarterback Ben Roethlisberger twice, along with a game-high 14 tackles in route to a 24-10 victory for the Bengals at Heinz Field in Week 3. Wilson finished the season with 4 interceptions, leading the team. In the AFC Divisional Playoff game against the top seeded Tennessee Titans, Wilson intercepted a tipped throw from Ryan Tannehill mid-field. This set up an eventual game-winning field goal by Evan McPherson, giving the Bengals their first road playoff win in franchise history, 19-16.

==== 2022 ====
Wilson began the season slow, with only 12 combined tackles in the first 2 games, but broke out for the first time in 2022 against the New York Jets in Week 3, recording 7 tackles, forcing one fumble and intercepting one pass, which he returned 41 yards. Against the Cleveland Browns in Week 13, Wilson had his career best game, making 14 solo tackles, with an additional three assisted for a total of 17 combined tackles. He was also credited with 0.5 sacks in the game, splitting it with Vonn Bell. The following week against the Tampa Bay Buccaneers, Wilson combined for 15 tackles and recorded his first sack of the season. At the conclusion of the regular season, Wilson led the team in tackles with 123.

In the Bengals' Wild Card playoff win over the Baltimore Ravens on January 15, 2023, he forced a fumble from Tyler Huntley on the Bengals' 1-yard line, which teammate Sam Hubbard recovered and returned 98 yards for a touchdown. In turn, Wilson's effort helped this to become the record for the longest fumble return for a touchdown in the NFL postseason, as well as being the longest go-ahead touchdown in the fourth quarter in the postseason, and the longest touchdown in Bengals playoff history.

==== 2023 ====
On August 4, 2023, Wilson signed a four-year contract extension with the Cincinnati Bengals.

On September 25, while facing the Los Angeles Rams, Wilson intercepted Rams quarterback Matthew Stafford twice. This tied his previous career high of two interceptions in a single game from 2021. In Week 6 against the Seattle Seahawks, Wilson was credited with 0.5 sacks, splitting with B. J. Hill. He made a crucial interception in the fourth quarter of the Bengals' Week 8 against the San Francisco 49ers, returning it for 16 yards setting up a go-ahead touchdown. Wilson led the team in tackles for the third straight year with 135 combined tackles, his career best season.

==== 2024 ====
Wilson started 11 games for the Bengals in 2024, compiling 1 pass deflection, 2 forced fumbles, 2 fumble recoveries, and 104 combined tackles. On December 6, 2024, it was announced that Wilson would be placed on injured reserve after undergoing season–ending knee surgery.

==== 2025 ====
On October 23, 2025, Wilson requested a trade due to the coaches' decision to give him a reduced role and fewer snaps on defense.

=== Dallas Cowboys ===
On November 4, 2025, the Cincinnati Bengals traded Wilson to the Dallas Cowboys in exchange for a 2026 seventh round pick (#221-Jack Endries). He was expected to compete for the starting middle linebacker position, but despite struggles from the defense and its linebackers, he couldn't overtake Kenneth Murray as the starter, eventually leading to Wilson being inactive for a game. He made 7 appearances (one start), recording 28 tackles, one quarterback hurry and one pass deflection.

On February 20, 2026, Wilson was released by the Cowboys. On March 18, Wilson announced his retirement from the NFL.

== NFL career statistics ==
Legend
**Bold**	Career high

=== Regular season ===
Year	Team	Games		Tackles				Fumbles				Interceptions					
Year	Team	GP	GS	Comb	Solo	Ast	Sack	FF	FR	Yds	TD	PD	Int	Yds	Avg	Lng	TD
2020	CIN	12	2	33	23	10	1.0	0	0	0	0	3	2	0	0.0	0	0
2021	CIN	13	13	100	57	43	1.0	1	0	0	0	4	**4**	31	17.5	18	0
2022	CIN	15	15	123	**83**	40	**2.5**	1	0	0	0	4	1	41	**41.0**	**41**	0
2023	CIN	**17**	**17**	**135**	78	**57**	1.0	**2**	0	0	0	**9**	**4**	**42**	10.5	26	0
2024	CIN	11	11	104	55	49	0.0	**2**	**2**	**10**	0	1	0	0	0.0	0	0
2025	CIN	8	7	46	19	27	0.0	0	1	0	0	4	0	0	0.0	0	0
2025	DAL	7	1	24	15	9	0.0	1	0	0	0	1	0	0	0.0	0	0
Career		83	66	565	330	235	5.5	7	3	10	0	26	11	114	10.4	41	0

=== Playoffs ===
Year	Team	Games		Tackles				Fumbles				Interceptions					
Year	Team	GP	GS	Comb	Solo	Ast	Sack	FF	FR	Yds	TD	PD	Int	Yds	Avg	Lng	TD
2021	CIN	4	4	39	26	13	0.0	0	0	0	0	3	1	0	0.0	0	0
2022	CIN	3	3	23	15	8	0.0	1	0	0	0	0	0	0	0.0	0	0
Career		7	7	62	41	21	0.0	1	0	0	0	3	1	0	0.0	0	0
