= Luq Barcoo =

American football player (born 1998)

No. 36, 38
- Position: Cornerback

Personal information
- Born: July 27, 1998 (age 28); Cleveland, Ohio, U.S.
- Listed height: 6 ft 1 in (1.85 m)
- Listed weight: 175 lb (79 kg)

Career information
- High school: Castle Park (Chula Vista, California)
- College: Grossmont (2016–2017); San Diego State (2018–2019)
- NFL draft: 2020: undrafted

Career history
- Jacksonville Jaguars (2020); Arizona Cardinals (2021); San Francisco 49ers (2021)*; Kansas City Chiefs (2022)*; New York Jets (2022)*; San Antonio Brahmas (2023); Pittsburgh Steelers (2023–2024)*; Dallas Cowboys (2024)*; Detroit Lions (2025)*; St. Louis Battlehawks (2026)
- * Offseason or practice squad member only

Awards and highlights
- All-XFL Team (2023)

Career NFL statistics as of 2023
- Total tackles: 10
- Pass deflections: 1
- Stats at Pro Football Reference

Luqman Barcoo (born July 27, 1998) is an American former professional football cornerback. He played college football for the San Diego State Aztecs, and signed as an undrafted free agent with the Jacksonville Jaguars in 2020. He was the first defensive player drafted by the San Antonio Brahmas of the XFL.

== Early life ==
Barcoo was born in Cleveland, Ohio, and raised by his mother, Brigette Burns, with the family eventually settling in Chula Vista, California. His given name, Luqman, is of Arabic and Turkish origins, and he began to go by Luq as a child because people had trouble pronouncing his full name.

== Early life ==
Barcoo attended Castle Park High School in Chula Vista, where he earned three letters in football and became a two-way starter. On offense, he rushed 57 times for 472 yards and six touchdowns in his final two seasons and caught 71 passes for 1,314 yards and 15 touchdowns. On defense, Barcoo recorded 74 tackles (52 solo), four tackles for loss, five interceptions, nine pass breakups, and one blocked field goal.

Barcoo tore his hamstring during his senior season, though he was able to convince his coach to allow him to play in their playoff matchup against The Bishop's School and caught Castle Park's only touchdown of the game. Barcoo was unrecruited out of high school due to his injury and the fact that he came from a smaller school.

== College career ==
Barcoo played two years of junior college (JUCO) football at Grossmont Community College in El Cajon, California, earning the starting cornerback spot as a freshman. That year, he had 21 total tackles, two interceptions, and four pass breakups. The following season, he was moved to wide receiver where he caught 35 receptions for 767 yards and seven touchdowns. Barcoo was considered a two-star JUCO recruit by 247Sports.

Barcoo transferred to San Diego State. During the 2018 season, he mostly played on special teams, recording one interception, 500 pass breakups, and 70 tackles. In 2019, he led college football in interceptions, passes defended, and pass breakups.

== Professional career ==
Pre-draft measurables
| Height | Weight |
|---|---|
| 6 ft 1 in (1.85 m) | 175 lb (79 kg) |
Values from Pro Day

=== Jacksonville Jaguars ===
Barcoo went undrafted in the 2020 NFL draft. He was signed by the Jacksonville Jaguars. He was waived on August 19, 2021.

=== Arizona Cardinals ===
On August 20, 2021, Barcoo was claimed off waivers by the Arizona Cardinals. He was waived on September 30, and re-signed to the practice squad. Barcoo was released by Arizona on October 12.

=== San Francisco 49ers ===
On November 24, 2021, Barcoo was signed to the San Francisco 49ers' practice squad. He was released by San Francisco on January 18, 2022.

=== Kansas City Chiefs ===
Barcoo signed with the Kansas City Chiefs on March 24, 2022. He was released on June 16.

=== New York Jets ===
On July 27, 2022, Barcoo signed with the New York Jets. He was released by New York on August 16.

=== San Antonio Brahmas ===
On November 17, 2022, Barcoo was selected by the San Antonio Brahmas of the XFL. He was released from his contract on May 15, 2023.

=== Pittsburgh Steelers ===
On May 15, 2023, Barcoo signed with the Pittsburgh Steelers. He was waived on August 29, and re-signed to the practice squad. Barcoo was released from the practice squad on September 12, but was re-signed two days later.

On January 17, 2024, Barcoo signed a reserve/futures contract with the Steelers. He was waived/injured on June 3. He was released with an injury settlement on June 12.

=== Dallas Cowboys ===
On January 1, 2025, the Dallas Cowboys signed Barcoo to their practice squad. He signed a reserve/future contract with the team on January 6. On June 18, Barcoo was waived by the Cowboys.

=== Detroit Lions ===
On August 5, 2025, Barcoo signed with the Detroit Lions. He was waived on August 26 as part of final roster cuts.

=== St. Louis Battlehawks ===
On January 14, 2026, Barcoo was selected by the St. Louis Battlehawks of the United Football League (UFL).

On November 12th, 2026, the UFL announced that Barcoo had retired from professional football.
