= JuJu Hughes =

American football player (born 1998)

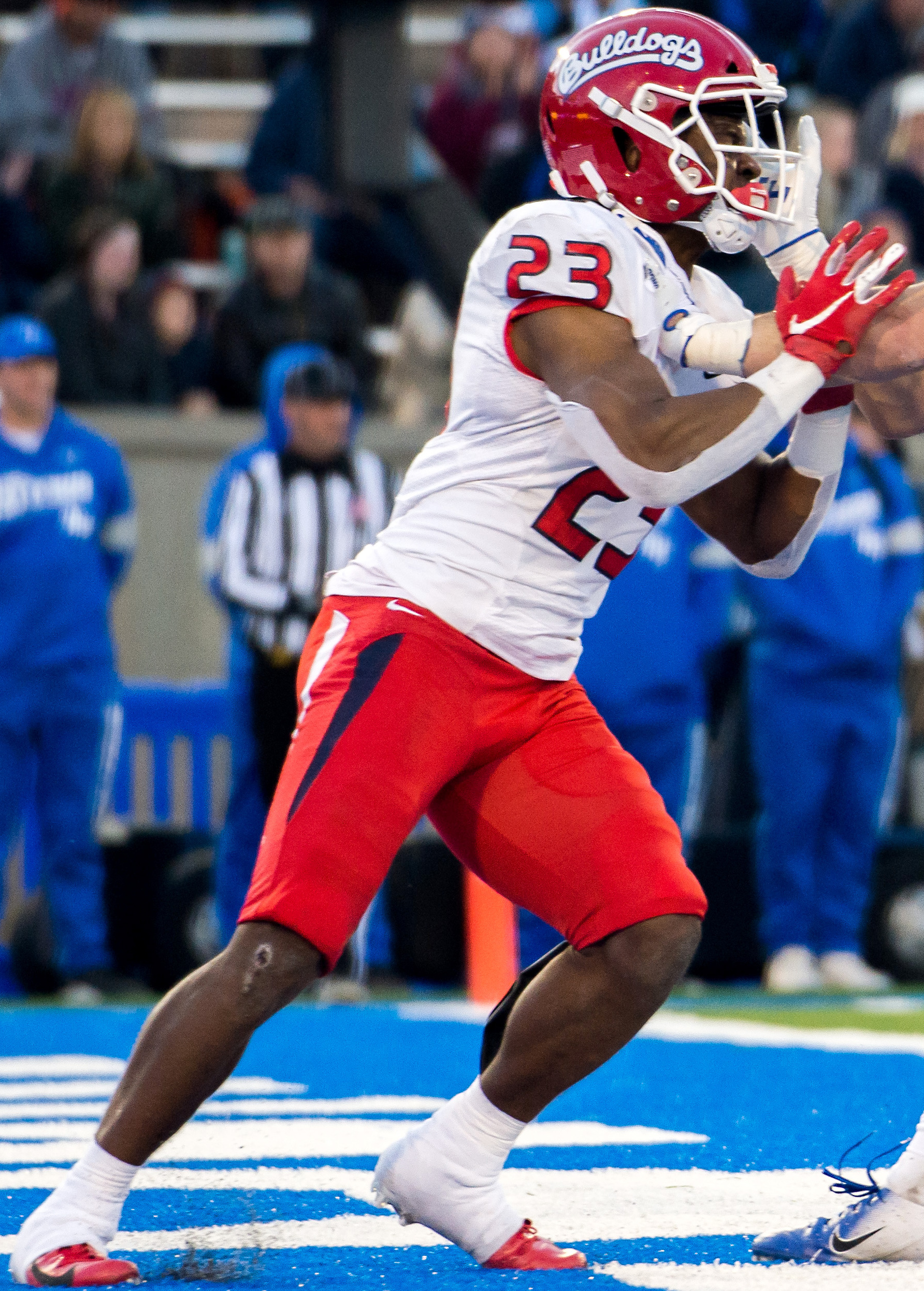
- Hughes with the Fresno State Bulldogs in 2019

Saskatchewan Roughriders
- Position: Safety
- Roster status: Practice roster
- CFL status: American

Personal information
- Born: July 19, 1998 (age 28); Hanford, California, U.S.
- Listed height: 5 ft 11 in (1.80 m)
- Listed weight: 191 lb (87 kg)

Career information
- High school: Hanford
- College: Fresno State
- NFL draft: 2020: undrafted

Career history
- Los Angeles Rams (2020–2021); Detroit Lions (2022); Arizona Cardinals (2022–2023)*; Birmingham Stallions (2024); Saskatchewan Roughriders (2026–present)
- * Offseason or practice squad member only

Awards and highlights
- Second-team All-Mountain West (2018)

Career NFL statistics
- Total tackles: 26
- Sacks: 1
- Stats at Pro Football Reference

Juwuane "JuJu" Hughes (born July 19, 1998) is an American professional football safety for the Saskatchewan Roughriders of the Canadian Football League (CFL). He played college football at Fresno State.

== Early life ==
Hughes was born in Lemoore, California, grew up in Hanford, California, and attended Hanford High School, where he played basketball and football as a defensive back, wide receiver and returner. He missed the first six games of his senior year due to a broken arm finished the season with eight receptions for 175 yards, including a 77-yard touchdown reception. Hughes committed to play college football at Fresno State over an offer from San Diego State.

== College career ==
Hughes was a member of the Fresno State Bulldogs for four seasons. As a junior, Hughes was named second-team All-Mountain West Conference after recording 78 tackles with eight passes defended and a conference-leading four interceptions. He had 80 tackles, seven passes defended and two tackles and was named honorable mention All-Mountain West. Hughes finished his collegiate career with 247 tackles, 28 passes defended and seven touchdowns in 52 games played.

== Professional career ==
Pre-draft measurables
Height	Weight
5 ft 10 3/4 in (1.80 m)	188 lb (85 kg)
All values from Pro Day

=== Los Angeles Rams ===
Hughes was signed by the Los Angeles Rams as an undrafted free agent following the 2020 NFL draft on April 26, 2020. He was waived on September 4, 2020, during final roster cuts, and was subsequently signed to the team's practice squad two days later. The Rams elevated Hughes to the active roster on October 3, 2020, and he made his NFL debut the following day in a 17–9 win over the New York Giants. He reverted to the practice squad after the game, and he was promoted to the team's active roster on October 13, 2020. He was waived on January 8, 2022.

=== Detroit Lions ===
On January 10, 2022, Hughes was claimed off waivers by the Detroit Lions. He made the Lions final roster, playing in seven games before being waived on November 19, 2022.

=== Arizona Cardinals ===
On November 23, 2022, the Arizona Cardinals signed Hughes to their practice squad. He signed a reserve/future contract on January 11, 2023.

On August 29, 2023, Hughes was released by the Cardinals as part of final roster cuts before the start of the 2023 season.

=== Birmingham Stallions ===
Hughes signed with the Birmingham Stallions of the United Football League (UFL) on April 25, 2024. He was released on May 21. He re-signed with the team on August 29, 2024. He was released on March 20, 2025.

=== Saskatchewan Roughriders ===
On March 19, 2026, Hughes signed with the Saskatchewan Roughriders of the Canadian Football League (CFL).
