= John Molchon =

American football player (born 1997)

Profile
- Position: Guard

Personal information
- Born: February 2, 1997 (age 29); Las Vegas, Nevada, U.S.
- Listed height: 6 ft 5 in (1.96 m)
- Listed weight: 309 lb (140 kg)

Career information
- High school: Faith Lutheran (Summerlin, Nevada)
- College: Boise State (2015–2019)
- NFL draft: 2020: undrafted

Career history
- Tampa Bay Buccaneers (2020–2023)

Awards and highlights
- Super Bowl champion (LV); 2× First-team All-MW (2018, 2019)

Career NFL statistics
- Games played: 1
- Stats at Pro Football Reference

John Molchon (born February 2, 1997) is an American professional football guard. He played college football at Boise State.

== Early life ==
Molchon grew up in Las Vegas, Nevada and attended Faith Lutheran Middle School & High School in Summerlin. He was ranked #9 by ESPN overall in Nevada and he led the Crusaders to their first state title in 2013, later being named the NIAA Division 1-A linebacker of the year. In 2020, John Molchon had his number retired by Faith Lutheran Middle School & High School.

== College career ==
Molchon redshirted his true freshman season at Boise State in 2015. For his 2016 season he appeared in seven games, making three starts and was a semifinalist for the Joe Moore Award. In 2017, he appeared in all 14 games, making 13 starts and was part of a Bronco line for the Mountain West's No. 2 scoring offense (32.5 ppg). For his 2018 season, he started all 13 games and was named to All-Mountain West First-team. In his 2019 senior season, he was named to All-Mountain West First-team for a second-straight season and was part of an offense that ranked 19th in the country in scoring.

== Professional career ==
Pre-draft measurables
Height	Weight	Arm length	Hand span	40-yard dash	10-yard split	20-yard split	20-yard shuttle	Three-cone drill	Vertical jump	Broad jump	Bench press
6 ft 5 1/4 in (1.96 m)	309 lb (140 kg)	31 1/8 in (0.79 m)	9 1/2 in (0.24 m)	5.13 s	1.79 s	3.01 s	4.73 s	7.85 s	34.0 in (0.86 m)	9 ft 1 in (2.77 m)	26 reps
All values from NFL Combine

Molchon signed a contract with the Tampa Bay Buccaneers as an undrafted free agent on April 25, 2020. He was placed on injured reserve on September 7, 2020. He was activated on October 30, 2020, but was waived the next day and re-signed to the practice squad on November 3. He was elevated to the active roster on November 28 for the team's week 12 game against the Kansas City Chiefs, and reverted to the practice squad after the game. On February 9, 2021, Molchon re-signed with the Buccaneers.

On September 2, 2021, Molchon was placed on injured reserve. He was activated on October 18, but waived the next day and re-signed to the practice squad. After the Buccaneers were eliminated in the Divisional Round of the 2021 playoffs, he signed a reserve/future contract on January 24, 2022.

On August 30, 2022, Molchon was waived by the Buccaneers and signed to the practice squad the next day. He was promoted to the active roster on November 2.

Molchon was waived on August 28, 2023 and re-signed to the practice squad on September 13. He was released on September 18.
