= Tipa Galeai =

American gridiron football player (born 1997)

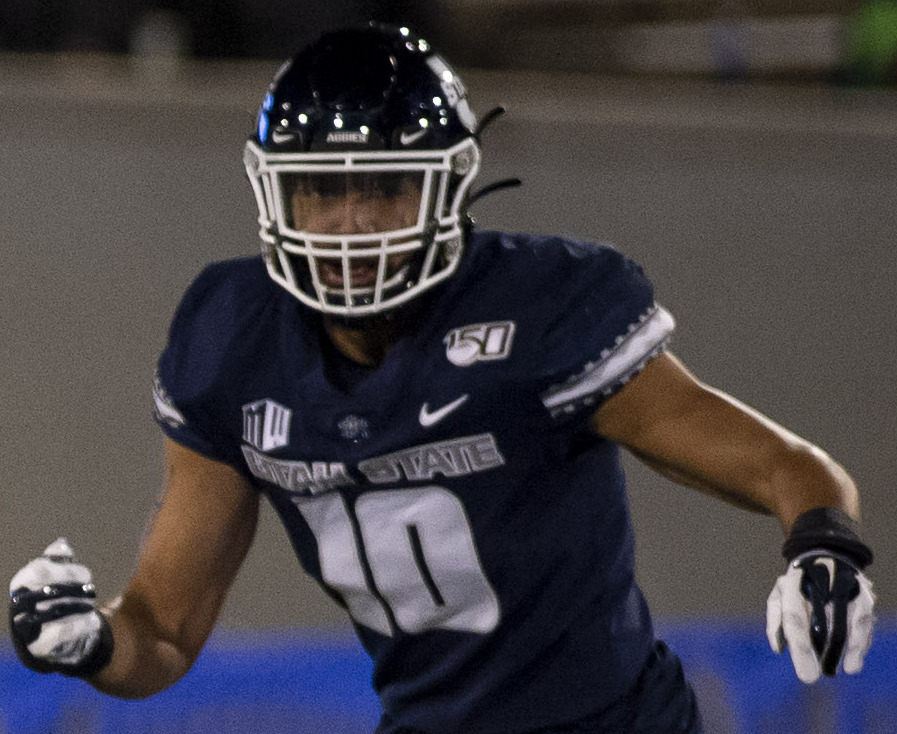
- Galeai with Utah State in 2019

Idaho State Bengals
- Title: Assistant defensive line coach

Personal information
- Born: February 26, 1997 (age 29); Euless, Texas, U.S.
- Listed height: 6 ft 5 in (1.96 m)
- Listed weight: 229 lb (104 kg)

Career information
- High school: Euless (TX) Trinity (Euless, Texas)
- College: TCU (2015–2016); Utah State (2018–2019)
- NFL draft: 2020: undrafted

Career history

Playing
- Green Bay Packers (2020–2022); BC Lions (2024)*
- * Offseason or practice squad member only

Coaching
- Idaho State (2025–present) Assistant defensive line coach

Career NFL statistics
- Total tackles: 16
- Sacks: 1
- Stats at Pro Football Reference
- Stats at CFL.ca

Tipa Te'i Galeai (born February 26, 1997) is an American professional football defensive lineman. He was signed by the Green Bay Packers as an undrafted free agent in 2020 following his college football career with the TCU Horned Frogs and the Utah State Aggies.

== Professional career ==
=== Green Bay Packers ===
Galeai signed with the Green Bay Packers as an undrafted free agent following the 2020 NFL draft on April 29, 2020. He was waived during final roster cuts on September 5, 2020, and was signed to the practice squad the next day. He was elevated to the active roster on September 12 for the week 1 game against the Minnesota Vikings, and then reverted to the team's practice squad following the game. On January 25, 2021, Galeai signed a reserve/futures contract with the Packers.

On August 31, 2021, Packers released Galeai as part of their final roster cuts. He was signed to the practice squad the next day. He was promoted to the active roster on November 16 to replace an injured Whitney Mercilus. On December 25, he recorded his first career sack on Baker Mayfield during a 24–22 win against the Cleveland Browns.

Galeai made the Packers' initial 53-man roster for the 2022 NFL season. On October 15, 2022, he was placed on injured reserve. He was released on December 27, 2022.

=== BC Lions ===
On January 30, 2024, Galeai signed with the BC Lions. He was released by the Lions on May 15, 2024.

== NFL career statistics ==
=== Regular season ===
Year	Team	GP	GS	Tackles					Interceptions						Fumbles	
Year	Team	GP	GS	Total	Solo	Ast	Sck	SFTY	PDef	Int	Yds	Avg	Lng	TDs	FF	FR
2020	GB	1	0	0	0	0	0	0	0	0	0	0	0	0	0	0
2021	GB	7	0	12	7	5	1.0	0	0	0	0	0	0	0	0	0
2022	GB	5	0	4	2	2	0.0	0	0	0	0	0	0	0	0	0
Total		13	0	16	9	7	1.0	0	0	0	0	0	0	0	0	0
Source: pro-football-reference.com

=== Postseason ===
Year	Team	GP	GS	Tackles					Interceptions						Fumbles	
Year	Team	GP	GS	Total	Solo	Ast	Sck	SFTY	PDef	Int	Yds	Avg	Lng	TDs	FF	FR
2021	GB	1	0	0	0	0	0	0	0	0	0	0	0	0	0	0
Total		1	0	0	0	0	0	0	0	0	0	0	0	0	0	0
Source: pro-football-reference.com
