= Javin White =

American football player (born 1997)

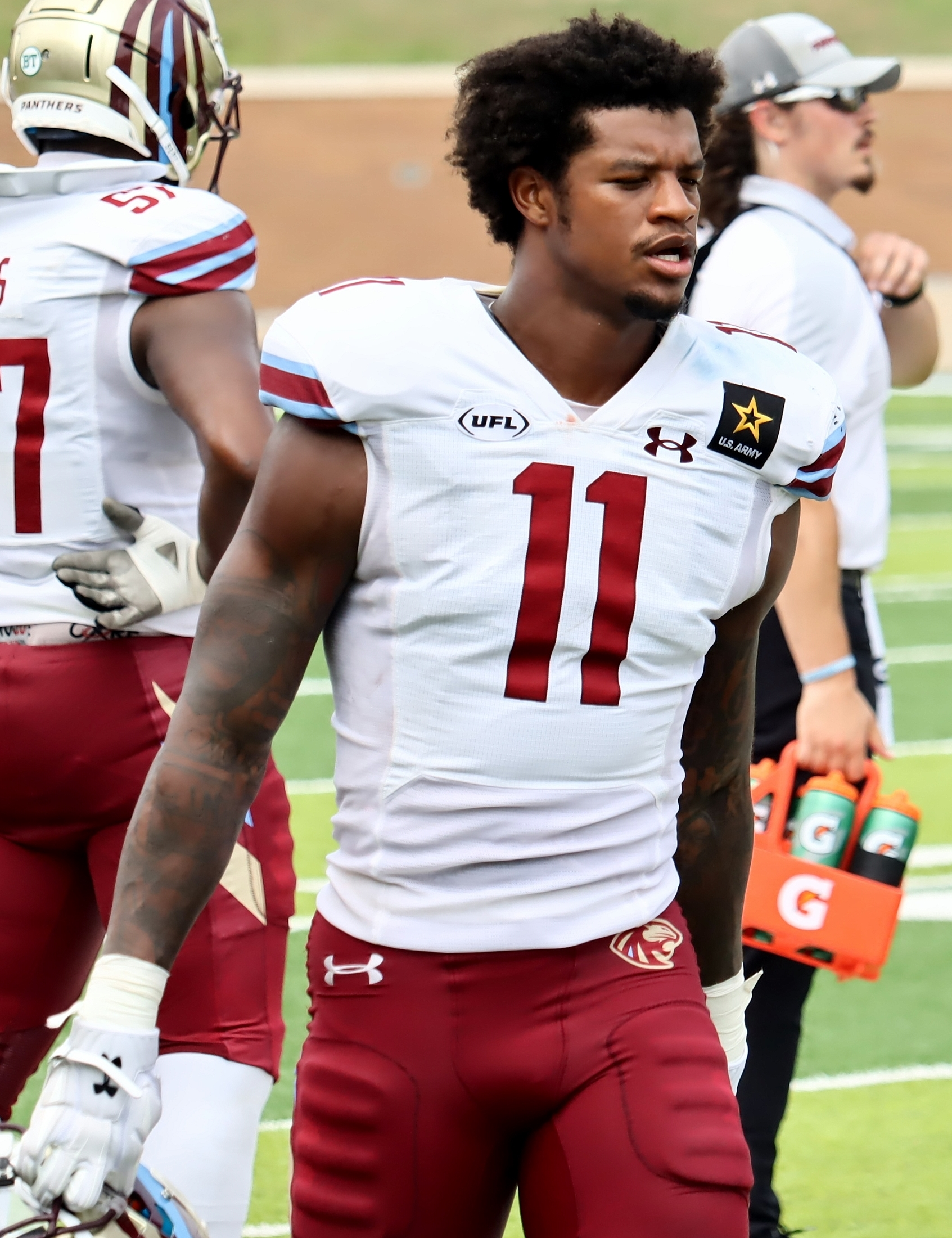
- White with the Michigan Panthers in 2024

No. 11
- Position: Linebacker

Personal information
- Born: February 21, 1997 (age 29); San Diego, California, U.S.
- Listed height: 6 ft 2 in (1.88 m)
- Listed weight: 211 lb (96 kg)

Career information
- High school: McClymonds (Oakland, California)
- College: UNLV (2015–2019)
- NFL draft: 2020: undrafted

Career history
- Las Vegas Raiders (2020–2021); New York Jets (2021); Chicago Bears (2022)*; Michigan Panthers (2024); Chicago Bears (2024)*; Michigan Panthers (2025)
- * Offseason or practice squad member only

Career NFL statistics
- Total tackles: 4
- Stats at Pro Football Reference

Javin Durrell White (born February 21, 1997) is an American former professional football player who was a linebacker in the National Football League (NFL). He played college football for the UNLV Rebels and signed with the Las Vegas Raiders as an undrafted free agent in 2020.

== Early life ==
White was born in San Diego, California, and grew up in Oakland, California. He attended Vanden High School in Fairfield, California for two years before transferring to Oakland's McClymonds High School and played wide receiver on the football team. As a senior, White caught 17 passes for 407 yards and eight touchdowns. He was rated a three-star recruit and committed to play college football for the UNLV Rebels over offers from New Mexico and New Mexico State.

== College career ==
White was a member of the UNLV Rebels for five seasons, redshirting as a true freshman as changed positions to defensive back. He played primarily on special teams as a redshirt freshman and began to see significant playing time as a safety/linebacker hybrid the following season, starting the final five games and making 42 tackles and intercepting two passes. As a redshirt junior, he started all 12 of UNLV's games and 74 tackles, 6.5 tackles for loss and two sacks while leading the team with four interceptions along with four passes broken up and four forced fumbles. He was named honorable mention All-Mountain West Conference as a redshirt senior after finished the season with 79 tackles, 8.5 tackles for loss and three interceptions. White finished his collegiate career with 201 tackles, 18 tackles for loss and 3.5 sacks with nine interception, 15 passes defended, seven forced fumbles and one fumble recovery in 43 games played, 29 of which he started.

== Professional career ==
=== Las Vegas Raiders ===
White was signed by the Las Vegas Raiders as an undrafted free agent on April 25, 2020. He was waived during final roster cuts on September 5, 2020, and signed to the team's practice squad the next day. The Raiders elevated White to the active roster on September 21, 2020, and made his debut that night on Monday Night Football against the New Orleans Saints. He reverted to the practice squad after the game. He was elevated to the active roster again for the weeks 11, 15, and 16 games against the Kansas City Chiefs, Los Angeles Chargers, and Miami Dolphins, and reverted to the practice squad again following each game. He signed a reserve/future contract on January 5, 2021.

On September 2, 2021, White was placed on injured reserve. He was activated on November 1, then released the next day. He was re-signed to the practice squad on November 4.

=== New York Jets ===
On December 29, 2021, White was signed by the New York Jets off the Raiders practice squad. He was waived on July 29, 2022.

=== Chicago Bears (first stint) ===
On August 7, 2022, White signed with the Chicago Bears. He was waived/injured on August 16, 2022, and placed on injured reserve.

=== Michigan Panthers ===
White signed with the Michigan Panthers of the USFL on October 24, 2023. His contract with the Panthers was terminated on July 21, 2024.

=== Chicago Bears (second stint) ===
White re-signed with the Bears on July 21, 2024. He was waived on August 26.

=== Michigan Panthers ===
On October 31, 2024, White re-signed with the Michigan Panthers.
