= Jordan Jackson (American football) =

American football player (born 1998)

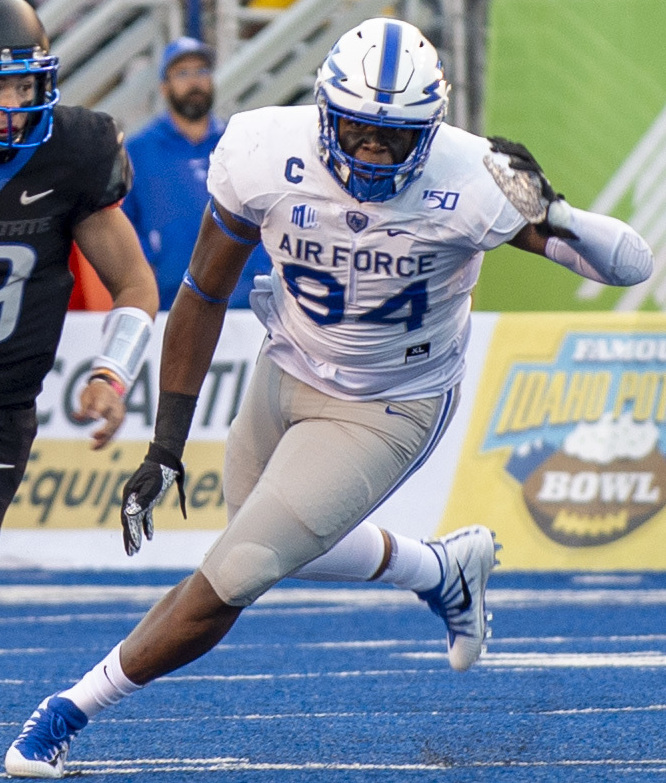
- Jackson with the Air Force Falcons in 2019

No. 94 – Denver Broncos
- Position: Defensive end
- Roster status: Active

Personal information
- Born: January 30, 1998 (age 28); Jacksonville, Florida, U.S.
- Listed height: 6 ft 4 in (1.93 m)
- Listed weight: 294 lb (133 kg)

Career information
- High school: Bolles (Jacksonville)
- College: Air Force (2017–2021)
- NFL draft: 2022: 6th round, 194th overall pick

Career history
- New Orleans Saints (2022)*; Denver Broncos (2023–present)
- * Offseason or practice squad member only

Awards and highlights
- Second-team All-MW (2021)

Career NFL statistics as of 2025
- Total tackles: 24
- Sacks: 1
- Forced fumbles: 1
- Stats at Pro Football Reference

Jordan Jackson (born January 30, 1998) is an American professional football defensive end for the Denver Broncos of the National Football League (NFL). He played college football for the Air Force Falcons and was selected by the New Orleans Saints in the sixth round of the 2022 NFL draft.

== College career ==
Jackson was ranked as a two–star recruit by 247Sports.com coming out of high school. He committed to Air Force and enrolled in the United States Air Force Academy before the 2017 season.

== Professional career ==
Pre-draft measurables
| Height | Weight | Arm length | Hand span | Wingspan | 40-yard dash | 10-yard split | 20-yard split | 20-yard shuttle | Three-cone drill | Vertical jump | Broad jump | Bench press |
|---|---|---|---|---|---|---|---|---|---|---|---|---|
| 6 ft 4 1/2 in (1.94 m) | 294 lb (133 kg) | 33 3/4 in (0.86 m) | 9 3/8 in (0.24 m) | 6 ft 9 1/2 in (2.07 m) | 4.96 s | 1.76 s | 2.82 s | 4.40 s | 7.20 s | 30.5 in (0.77 m) | 9 ft 4 in (2.84 m) | 18 reps |
All values from NFL Combine/Pro Day

=== New Orleans Saints ===
Jackson was selected by the New Orleans Saints with the 194th pick in the sixth round of the 2022 NFL draft. He was waived on August 30, 2022 and signed to the practice squad the next day.

=== Denver Broncos ===
On January 10, 2023, Jackson signed a futures contract with the Denver Broncos. He was waived on August 29, 2023 and re-signed to the practice squad. He signed a reserve/future contract on January 8, 2024. In September of 2024, after Jackson made the initial 53-man roster entering the 2024 season, Broncos general manager George Paton noted that he had wanted to draft Jackson in 2022.

On March 4, 2025, the Broncos assigned his exclusive-rights free agent tender, keeping him under contract through the 2025 season.

On March 6, 2026, the Broncos once again assigned his ERFA tender.
