= 2017 Boise State Broncos football team =

American college football season

2017 Boise State Broncos football

Mountain West champion MW Mountain Division champion Las Vegas Bowl champion

MW Championship Game, W 17–14 vs. Fresno State

Las Vegas Bowl, W 38–28 vs. Oregon
- Conference: Mountain West Conference
- Mountain Division

Ranking
- Coaches: No. 22
- AP: No. 22
- Record: 11–3 (7–1 MW)
- Head coach: Bryan Harsin (4th season)
- Offensive coordinator: Zak Hill (2nd season)
- Offensive scheme: Multiple
- Defensive coordinator: Andy Avalos (2nd season)
- Base defense: Multiple
- Home stadium: Albertsons Stadium

Uniform
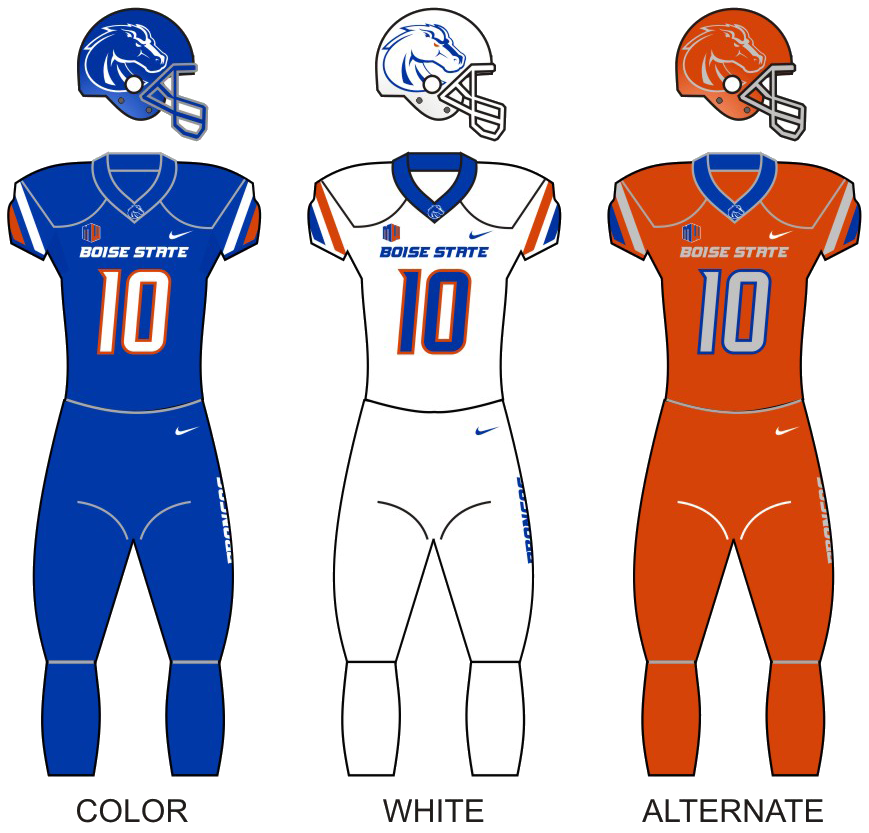

2017 Mountain West Conference football standings
	Conf.			Overall
Team	W		L	W		L
Mountain Division
No. 22 Boise State xy$	7	–	1	11	–	3
Colorado State	5	–	3	7	–	6
Wyoming	5	–	3	8	–	5
Utah State	4	–	4	6	–	7
Air Force	4	–	4	5	–	7
New Mexico	1	–	7	3	–	9
West Division
Fresno State xy	7	–	1	10	–	4
San Diego State	6	–	2	10	–	3
UNLV	4	–	4	5	–	7
Nevada	3	–	5	3	–	9
Hawaii	1	–	7	3	–	9
San Jose State	1	–	7	2	–	11
Championship: Boise State 17, Fresno State 14
$ – Conference champion; x – Division champion/co-champions; y – Championship game participant; Rankings from AP Poll

The 2017 Boise State Broncos football team represented Boise State University during the 2017 NCAA Division I FBS football season. This season was the Broncos' 81st season overall, seventh as a member of the Mountain West Conference and fifth within the Mountain Division. The Broncos played their home games at Albertsons Stadium in Boise, Idaho. They were led by fourth-year head coach Bryan Harsin. They finished the season 11–3, 7–1 in Mountain West play to win the Mountain Division. They defeated West Division champion Fresno State in the Mountain West Championship Game to become Mountain West champions. They were invited to the Las Vegas Bowl where they defeated Oregon.

== Preseason ==
=== Award watch lists ===
Listed in the order that they were released.

Rimington Trophy – Sr. C Mason Hampton

Chuck Bednarik Award – Jr. DT David Moa

Maxwell Award – Jr. QB Brett Rypien

Bronko Nagurski Trophy – Jr. DT David Moa

Outland Trophy – Sr. OT Archie Lewis & Jr. DT David Moa

John Mackey Award – Sr. TE Jake Roh

Paul Hornung Award – Sr. WR Cedrick Wilson Jr.

Fred Biletnikoff Award – Sr. WR Cedrick Wilson

Wuerffel Trophy – Jr. QB Brett Rypien

Davey O'Brien Award – Jr. QB Brett Rypien

Walter Camp Award – Jr. QB Brett Rypien

Manning Award – Jr. QB Brett Rypien

=== Mountain West media days ===
At the Mountain West media days, held at the Cosmopolitan in Las Vegas, Nevada, the Broncos were picked as the overwhelming favorites to win the Mountain Division title, receiving 21 of a possible 28 first place votes. Sr. OL Mason Hampton was selected to the all-conference first team offense. Jr. DL David Moa and Jr. DB Tyler Horton were selected to the all-conference first team defense.

=== Media poll ===
==== Mountain Division ====
1. Boise State – 161 (21)
2. Colorado State – 135 (6)
3. Wyoming – 114 (1)
4. Air Force – 82
5. New Mexico – 68
6. Utah State – 28

== Schedule ==
Date	Time	Opponent	Rank	Site	TV	Result	Attendance
September 2	1:45 p.m.	Troy*		Albertsons Stadium; Boise, ID	ESPNU	W 24–13	31,581
September 9	8:30 p.m.	at No. 20 Washington State*		Martin Stadium; Pullman, WA	ESPN	L 44–47 ^{3OT}	32,631
September 14	6:00 p.m.	New Mexico		Albertsons Stadium; Boise, ID	ESPN	W 28–14	28,385
September 22	6:00 p.m.	Virginia*		Albertsons Stadium; Boise, ID	ESPN2	L 23–42	33,947
October 6	8:15 p.m.	at BYU*		LaVell Edwards Stadium; Provo, UT	ESPN	W 24–7	59,753
October 14	8:30 p.m.	at No. 19 San Diego State		SDCCU Stadium; San Diego, CA	CBSSN	W 31–14	49,053
October 21	8:15 p.m.	Wyoming		Albertsons Stadium; Boise, ID	ESPN2	W 24–14	35,565
October 28	8:00 p.m.	at Utah State		Maverik Stadium; Logan, UT	CBSSN	W 41–14	19,012
November 4	5:00 p.m.	Nevada^{†}		Albertsons Stadium; Boise, ID (rivalry)	ESPNU	W 41–14	30,858
November 11	8:30 p.m.	at Colorado State		Colorado State Stadium; Fort Collins, CO	CBSSN	W 59–52 ^{OT}	32,166
November 18	8:15 p.m.	Air Force	No. 25	Albertsons Stadium; Boise, ID	ESPN2	W 44–19	33,030
November 25	1:30 p.m.	at Fresno State	No. 23	Bulldog Stadium; Fresno, CA (Battle for the Milk Can)	CBSSN	L 17–28	31,526
December 2	5:45 p.m.	No. 25 Fresno State		Albertsons Stadium; Boise, ID (MW Championship Game)	ESPN	W 17–14	24,515
December 16	1:30 p.m.	vs. Oregon*	No. 25	Sam Boyd Stadium; Whitney, NV (Las Vegas Bowl)	ABC	W 38–28	36,432
*Non-conference game; ^{†}Homecoming; Rankings from AP Poll and CFP Rankings after October 31 released prior to game; All times are in Mountain time

Schedule source

== Roster ==
2017 Boise State Broncos football team roster
Players
Coaches
Offense

Pos.	#	Name	Class
WR	1	Cedrick Wilson Jr.	Sr
QB	3	Montell Cozart	Sr
QB	4	Brett Rypien	Jr
WR	6	C. T. Thomas	Fr
WR	7	A. J. Richardson	Jr
WR	8	Sean Modster	Jr
QB	10	Chase Cord	Fr
QB	16	Tanner Bolt	Fr
WR	17	Austin Cottrell	Sr
RB	21	Ryan Wolpin	Sr
RB	22	Alexander Mattison	So
RB	29	Drake Beasley	Fr
WR	30	Ravon Alexander	Jr
WR	31	Justin Collins	So
RB	34	Robert Mahone	Fr
RB	39	Jake Shaddox	So
TE	47	Matt Pistone	So
OL	52	Andrew Tercek	Sr
OL	59	Mason Hampton	Sr
OL	64	Ben Vering	Fr
OL	65	Zachary Troughton	Jr
OL	66	Isiah Moore	Jr
OL	67	Garrett Larson	So
OL	68	Jake Stetz	Fr
OL	69	Austin Dixon	Fr
OL	70	John Ojukwu	Fr
OL	71	Donte Harrington	Fr
OL	73	Nick Crabtree	Fr
OL	74	Archie Lewis	Sr
OL	75	Kole Bailey	Fr
OL	76	Ezra Cleveland	Fr
OL	77	John Molchon	So
OL	78	Andres Preciado	Jr
OL	79	Eric Quevedo	So
WR	80	Christian Blaser	Fr
WR	81	Akilian Butler	Jr
WR	82	Octavius Evans	Fr
WR	83	Damon Cole	Fr
TE	85	John Bates	Fr
TE	86	Chase Blakley	Jr
TE	87	Alec Dhaenans	Sr
TE	88	Jake Roh	Sr
WR	89	Brock Barr	Sr

Defense

Pos.	#	Name	Class
CB	4	DeAndre Pierce	So
OLB	5	Garrett Collingham	So
OLB	7	Ezekiel Noa	Fr
DE	8	Jabril Frazier	Jr
OLB	9	Desmond Williams	Fr
S	10	Kekoa Nawahine	So
CB	13	Marques Evans	Fr
CB	14	Tyler Horton	Jr
S	15	Evan Tyler	So
S	15	Jalen Walker	Fr
MLB	17	Phillip Mills	Fr
CB	18	Jermani Brown	Fr
DE	19	Aisa Kelemete	Fr
OLB	20	Roman Kafentzis	Fr
CB	21	Tyreque Jones	Fr
S	23	Damion Wright	So
MLB	24	Breydon Boyd	Fr
MLB	25	Benton Wickersham	Fr
CB	26	Avery Williams	Fr
CB	28	Kekaula Kaniho	Fr
CB	30	Robert Lewis	Fr
S	31	Skyler Seibold	Jr
S	32	Jordan Happle	Fr
OLB	33	Gabe Perez	Sr
MLB	34	Solo Taylor	Fr
DE	35	Derriyon Shaw	Fr
OLB	36	Blake Whitlock	Sr
S	37	Cameron Hartsfield	Sr
OLB	38	Leighton Vander Esch	Jr
DT	40	Jabari Watson	Fr
OLB	41	Will Heffner	So
OLB	42	Clay Bowler	Fr
MLB	43	Joe Provenzano	Jr
OLB	44	Riley Whimpey	Fr
DE	45	Kayode Rufai	Fr
S	47	Ma'a Tanuvasa	Fr
MLB	48	Bruno DeRose	Fr
LB	49	John Mackesy	Jr
DE	53	Sam Whitney	So
DT	54	Matt Locher	So
DT	55	David Moa	Jr
MLB	56	Joseph Inda	Jr
DT	57	Emmanuel Fesili	So
MLB	58	Tyson Maeva	So
DT	90	Daniel Auelua	Sr
DE	91	Durrant Miles	Jr
DT	92	Paul Semons	Jr
DT	93	Chase Hatada	So
OLB	95	Nick Provenzano	Fr
DT	97	Austin Silsby	Sr
DT	98	Sonatane Lui	So
DE	99	Curtis Weaver	Fr

Special teams

Pos.	#	Name	Class
K	46	Joel Velazquez	Fr
P	49	Quinn Skillin	Jr
LS	50	Nicholai Pitman	So
LS	51	Daniel Cantrell	Fr
K	94	Kevin Madigan	Fr
K	96	Haden Hoggarth	Jr

Head coach

- Bryan Harsin

Coordinators/assistant coaches

- Kent Riddle – Associate head coach/Special teams coordinator/Tight ends
- Zak Hill – Offensive coordinator/Quarterbacks
- Andy Avalos – Defensive coordinator
- Lee Marks – Running backs
- Eric Kiesau – Wide receivers
- Ashley Ambrose – Cornerbacks
- Brad Bedell – Offensive linemen
- Steve Caldwell – Defensive linemen
- Gabe Franklin – Safeties
- Jeff Pitman – Director, Strength and Conditioning
- Mark Mace – Quality control, Offense
- Matt Coombs – Quality control, Defense
- Dustin Kamper – Quality control, Special teams
- Spencer Danielson – Graduate assistant
- Latu Heimuli – Graduate assistant
- Nate Potter – Graduate assistant
- Derek Schouman – Graduate assistant

Legend

- (C) Team captain
- (S) Suspended
- (I) Ineligible
- Injured
- Redshirt

Roster
Last update: 8/12/23

== Game summaries ==
=== Troy ===
Troy at Boise State

Team	1	2	3	4	Total
Trojans	3	7	0	3	13
• Broncos	7	10	0	7	24

- Date: September 2, 2017
- Location: Albertsons Stadium
  Boise, ID
- Game start: 1:47 p.m. MDT
- Elapsed time: 3 hours and 26 minutes
- Game attendance: 31,581
- Game weather: Temperature: 92 °F (33 °C) • Weather: Sunny • Wind: Calm
- Referee: Ted Pitts
- TV announcers (ESPNU): Mike Couzens and John Congemi

Uniform Combination
Helmet	Jersey	Pants

- Passing leaders: Brett Rypien (BSU): 15–27, 183 YDS, 1 INT; Brandon Silvers (Troy): 17–33, 146 YDS, 1 INT.
- Rushing leaders: Alexander Mattison (BSU): 13 CAR, 82 YDS, 1 TD; Jordan Chunn (Troy): 11 CAR, 41 YDS.
- Receiving leaders: Cedrick Wilson Jr. (BSU): 4 REC, 65 YDS; Damion Willis (Troy): 2 REC, 27 YDS.

=== At Washington State ===
Boise State at Washington State

Team	1	2	3	4	OT	2OT	3OT	Total
Broncos	7	3	7	14	3	7	3	44
• No. 20 Cougars	7	3	0	21	3	7	6	47

- Date: September 9, 2017
- Location: Martin Stadium
  Pullman, WA
- Game start: 8:36 p.m. MDT
- Elapsed time: 4 hours and 6 minutes
- Game attendance: 32,631
- Game weather: Temperature: 71 °F (22 °C) • Weather: Partly Cloudy • Wind: WSW 8
- Referee: Terry Leyden
- TV announcers (ESPN): Mark Jones, Rod Gilmore and Quint Kessenich (sideline)

Uniform Combination
Helmet	Jersey	Pants

- Passing leaders: Montell Cozart (BSU): 12–20, 161 YDS, 2 TD, 1 INT; Tyler Hilinski (WSU): 25–33, 235 YDS, 3 TD, 1 INT.
- Rushing leaders: Montell Cozart (BSU): 14 CAR, 72 YDS, 1 TD; James Williams (WSU): 14 CAR, 31 YDS.
- Receiving leaders: Cedrick Wilson Jr. (BSU): 9 REC, 147 YDS, 2 TD; Renard Bell (WSU): 7 REC, 107 YDS.

=== New Mexico ===
New Mexico at Boise State

Team	1	2	3	4	Total
Lobos	0	7	0	7	14
• Broncos	7	7	0	14	28

- Date: September 14, 2017
- Location: Albertsons Stadium
  Boise, ID
- Game start: 6:05 p.m. MDT
- Elapsed time: 3 hours and 2 minutes
- Game attendance: 28,385
- Game weather: Temperature: 70 °F (21 °C) • Weather: Partly Cloudy • Wind: NW 10 MPH
- Referee: Mike Defee
- TV announcers (ESPN): Dave Flemming, Brock Huard and Laura Rutledge (sideline)

Uniform Combination
Helmet	Jersey	Pants

- Passing leaders: Montell Cozart (BSU): 15–19, 137 YDS, 2 TD; Coltin Gerhart (UNM): 7–13, 67 YDS, 1 TD, 1 INT.
- Rushing leaders: Montell Cozart (BSU): 11 CAR, 68 YDS, 1 TD; Tyrone Owens (UNM): 14 CAR, 46 YDS, 1 TD.
- Receiving leaders: Cedrick Wilson Jr. (BSU): 3 REC, 64 YDS; Delane Hart-Johnson (UNM): 2 REC, 24 YDS.

=== Virginia ===
Virginia at Boise State

Team	1	2	3	4	Total
• Cavaliers	7	14	14	7	42
Broncos	7	7	0	9	23

- Date: September 22, 2017
- Location: Albertsons Stadium
  Boise, ID
- Game start: 6:01 p.m. MDT
- Elapsed time: 3 hours and 24 minutes
- Game attendance: 33,947
- Game weather: Temperature: 51 °F (11 °C) • Weather: Cloudy • Wind: N 4 MPH
- Referee: David Epperly
- TV announcers (ESPN2): Adam Amin, Dusty Dvoracek and Molly McGrath (sideline)

Uniform Combination
Helmet	Jersey	Pants

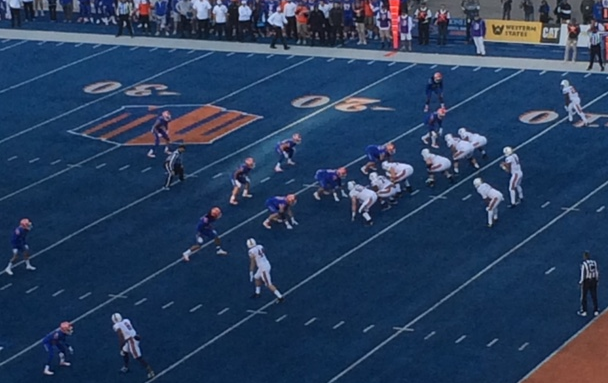
Boise State on defense in the 1st half.

- Passing leaders: Brett Rypien (BSU): 24–42, 285 YDS, 1 INT; Kurt Benkert (UVA): 19–29, 273 YDS, 3 TD.
- Rushing leaders: Robert Mahone (BSU): 3 CAR, 21 YDS; Jordan Ellis (UVA): 24 CAR, 93 YDS, 2 TD.
- Receiving leaders: Cedrick Wilson Jr. (BSU): 13 REC, 209 YDS, 1 TD; Andre Levrone (UVA): 5 REC, 141 YDS, 2 TD.

=== At BYU ===
Boise State at BYU

Team	1	2	3	4	Total
• Broncos	0	17	0	7	24
Cougars	7	0	0	0	7

- Date: October 6, 2017
- Location: LaVell Edwards Stadium
  Provo, UT
- Game start: 8:26 p.m. MDT
- Elapsed time: 3 hours and 12 minutes
- Game attendance: 59,753
- Game weather: Temperature: 50 °F (10 °C) • Weather: Night Game • Wind: Calm
- Referee: Kevin Hassell
- TV announcers (ESPN): Adam Amin, Dusty Dvoracek and Molly McGrath (sideline)

Uniform Combination
Helmet	Jersey	Pants

- Passing leaders: Brett Rypien (BSU): 12–19, 125 YDS, 1 TD, 1 INT; Tanner Mangum (BYU): 18–33, 164 YDS, 2 INT.
- Rushing leaders: Alexander Mattison (BSU): 29 CAR, 118 YDS, 2 TD; Ula Tolutau (BYU): 9 CAR, 38 YDS, 1 TD.
- Receiving leaders: Cedrick Wilson Jr. (BSU): 3 REC, 43 YDS; Matt Bushman (ABC): 7 REC, 65 YDS.

=== At San Diego State ===
Boise State at San Diego State

Team	1	2	3	4	Total
• Broncos	14	7	0	10	31
No. 19 Aztecs	0	0	7	7	14

- Date: October 14, 2017
- Location: SDCCU Stadium
  San Diego, CA
- Game start: 8:39 p.m. MDT
- Elapsed time: 3 hours and 13 minutes
- Game attendance: 49,053
- Game weather: Temperature: 69 °F (21 °C) • Weather: Partly Cloudy • Wind: Calm
- Referee: Brandon Cruse
- TV announcers (CBSSN): Carter Blackburn, Aaron Taylor and Jenny Dell (sideline)

Uniform Combination
Helmet	Jersey	Pants

- Passing leaders: Brett Rypien (BSU): 11–19, 72 YDS, 1 TD; Christian Chapman (SDSU): 12–27, 240 YDS, 1 TD.
- Rushing leaders: Alexander Mattison (BSU): 23 CAR, 128 YDS, 1 TD; Rashaad Penny (SDSU): 21 CAR, 53 YDS, 1 TD.
- Receiving leaders: Cedrick Wilson Jr. (BSU): 2 REC, 60 YDS; Fred Trevillion (SDSU): 2 REC, 128 YDS, 1 TD.

=== Wyoming ===
Wyoming at Boise State

Team	1	2	3	4	Total
Cowboys	7	0	7	0	14
• Broncos	0	3	7	14	24

- Date: October 21, 2017
- Location: Albertsons Stadium
  Boise, ID
- Game start: 8:21 p.m. MDT
- Elapsed time: 3 hours and 6 minutes
- Game attendance: 35,565
- Game weather: Temperature: 43 °F (6 °C) • Weather: Light Rain • Wind: ESE 12
- Referee: David Alvarez
- TV announcers (ESPN2): Roy Philpott and Tom Ramsey

Uniform Combination
Helmet	Jersey	Pants

- Passing leaders: Brett Rypien (BSU): 12–17, 104 YDS; Josh Allen (WYO): 12–27, 131 YDS, 1 TD, 2 INT.
- Rushing leaders: Alexander Mattison (BSU): 17 CAR, 91 YDS; Josh Allen (WYO): 18 CAR, 62 YDS, 1 TD.
- Receiving leaders: Cedrick Wilson Jr. (BSU): 5 REC, 66 YDS, 1 TD; Austin Conway (WYO): 5 REC, 33 YDS.

=== At Utah State ===
Boise State at Utah State

Team	1	2	3	4	Total
• Broncos	14	14	7	6	41
Aggies	7	0	7	0	14

- Date: October 28, 2017
- Location: Maverik Stadium
  Logan, UT
- Game start: 8:07 p.m. MDT
- Elapsed time: 3 hours and 26 minutes
- Game attendance: 19,012
- Game weather: Temperature: 52 °F (11 °C) • Weather: Clear Skies • Wind: 5 MPH SE
- Referee: Kevin Hassell
- TV announcers (CBSSN): Carter Blackburn, Aaron Taylor and Jenny Dell (sideline)

Uniform Combination
Helmet	Jersey	Pants

- Passing leaders: Brett Rypien (BSU): 19–27, 260 YDS, 3 TD; Jordan Love (USU): 17–32, 168 YDS, 1 TD.
- Rushing leaders: Alexander Mattison (BSU): 19 CAR, 110 YDS; Tre Miller (USU): 7 CAR, 40 YDS.
- Receiving leaders: Cedrick Wilson Jr. (BSU): 6 REC, 94 YDS, 1 TD; Ron'quavion Tarver (USU): 3 REC, 77 YDS, 1 TD.

=== Nevada ===
Nevada at Boise State
(rivalry)

Team	1	2	3	4	Total
Wolf Pack	7	7	0	0	14
• Broncos	10	21	7	3	41

- Date: November 4, 2017
- Location: Albertsons Stadium
  Boise, ID
- Game start: 5:02 p.m. MDT
- Elapsed time: 3 hours
- Game attendance: 30,858
- Game weather: Temperature: 42 °F (6 °C) • Weather: Partly Sunny • Wind: 9 MPH NW
- Referee: Stephen Baron
- TV announcers (ESPNU): Clay Matvick and Kirk Morrison

Uniform Combination
Helmet	Jersey	Pants

- Passing leaders: Brett Rypien (BSU): 20–27, 258 YDS, 2 TD; Ty Gangi (NEV): 24–37, 160 YDS, 1 TD, 3 INT.
- Rushing leaders: Alexander Mattison (BSU): 12 CAR, 64 YDS, 2 TD; Kelton Moore (NEV): 17 CAR, 106 YDS, 1 TD.
- Receiving leaders: Cedrick Wilson Jr. (BSU): 5 REC, 80 YDS, 1 TD; Wyatt Demps (NEV): 6 REC, 61 YDS.

=== At Colorado State ===
Boise State at Colorado State

Team	1	2	3	4	OT	Total
• Broncos	3	14	21	14	7	59
Rams	21	14	7	10	0	52

- Date: November 11, 2017
- Location: Colorado State Stadium
  Fort Collins, CO
- Game start: 8:35 p.m. MST
- Elapsed time: 4 hours and 30 minutes
- Game attendance: 32,166
- Game weather: Temperature: 44 °F (7 °C) • Weather: Clear and Windy • Wind: 22 MPH N
- Referee: Cooper Castlebe
- TV announcers (CBSSN): Rich Waltz, David Diehl and Jenny Dell (sideline)

Uniform Combination
Helmet	Jersey	Pants

- Passing leaders: Brett Rypien (BSU): 23–43, 315 YDS, 4 TD, 1 INT; Nick Stevens (CSU): 29–43, 309 YDS, 2 TD, 1 INT.
- Rushing leaders: Alexander Mattison (BSU): 23 CAR, 242 YDS, 3 TD; Dalyn Dawkins (CSU): 32 CAR, 161 YDS, 2 TD.
- Receiving leaders: Cedrick Wilson Jr. (BSU): 3 REC, 73 YDS; Michael Gallup (CSU): 11 REC, 102 YDS, 1 TD.

Alexander Mattison set the Boise State record for yards from scrimmage with 286 yards. Mattison rushed for 242 yards on the ground and picked up 44 receiving yards.

=== Air Force ===
Air Force at Boise State

Team	1	2	3	4	Total
Falcons	7	3	0	9	19
• No. 25 Broncos	17	10	10	7	44

- Date: November 18, 2017
- Location: Albertsons Stadium
  Boise, ID
- Game start: 8:26 p.m. MST
- Elapsed time: 3 hours and 2 minutes
- Game attendance: 33,030
- Game weather: Temperature: 37 °F (3 °C) • Weather: Fair • Wind: ESE 9
- Referee: Reggie Smith
- TV announcers (ESPN2): Roy Philpott and Tom Ramsey

Uniform Combination
Helmet	Jersey	Pants

- Passing leaders: Brett Rypien (BSU): 16–22, 300 YDS, 3 TD; Nate Romine (AF): 7–10, 115 YDS.
- Rushing leaders: Alexander Mattison (BSU): 17 CAR, 42 YDS; Nate Romine (AF): 16 CAR, 54 YDS, 1 TD.
- Receiving leaders: A. J. Richardson (BSU): 3 REC, 123 YDS, 1 TD; Marcus Bennett (AF): 3 REC, 63 YDS.

=== At Fresno State ===
Boise State at Fresno State
(Battle for the Milk Can)

Team	1	2	3	4	Total
No. 24 Broncos	7	0	3	7	17
• Bulldogs	7	3	6	12	28

- Date: November 25, 2017
- Location: Bulldog Stadium
  Fresno, CA
- Game start: 1:35 p.m. MST
- Elapsed time: 3 hours and 27 minutes
- Game attendance: 31,526
- Game weather: Temperature: 72 °F (22 °C) • Weather: Sunny • Wind: SW 4 MPH
- Referee: David Alvarez
- TV announcers (CBSSN): Rich Waltz, Jay Feely and Jenny Dell (sideline)

Uniform Combination
Helmet	Jersey	Pants

- Passing leaders: Brett Rypien (BSU): 22–31, 278 YDS; Marcus McMaryion (FS): 23–36, 332 YDS, 2 TD.
- Rushing leaders: Alexander Mattison (BSU): 15 CAR, 63 YDS, 1 TD; Jordan Mims (FS): 11 CAR, 43 YDS, 1 TD.
- Receiving leaders: Cedrick Wilson Jr. (BSU): 7 REC, 134 YDS; KeeSean Johnson (FS): 6 REC, 119 YDS, 2 TD.

=== Fresno State (Mountain West Championship Game) ===
Boise State vs Fresno State
(Mountain West Conference Championship Game)

Team	1	2	3	4	Total
No. 25 Bulldogs	0	14	0	0	14
• Broncos	3	7	0	7	17

- Date: December 2, 2017
- Location: Albertsons Stadium
  Boise, ID
- Game start: 5:50 p.m. MST
- Elapsed time: 3 hours and 27 minutes
- Game attendance: 24,515
- Game weather: Temperature: 40 °F (4 °C) • Weather: Cloudy • Wind: E 4 MPH
- Referee: David Alvarez
- TV announcers (ESPN): Adam Amin, Dusty Dvoracek and Molly McGrath (sideline)

Uniform Combination
Helmet	Jersey	Pants

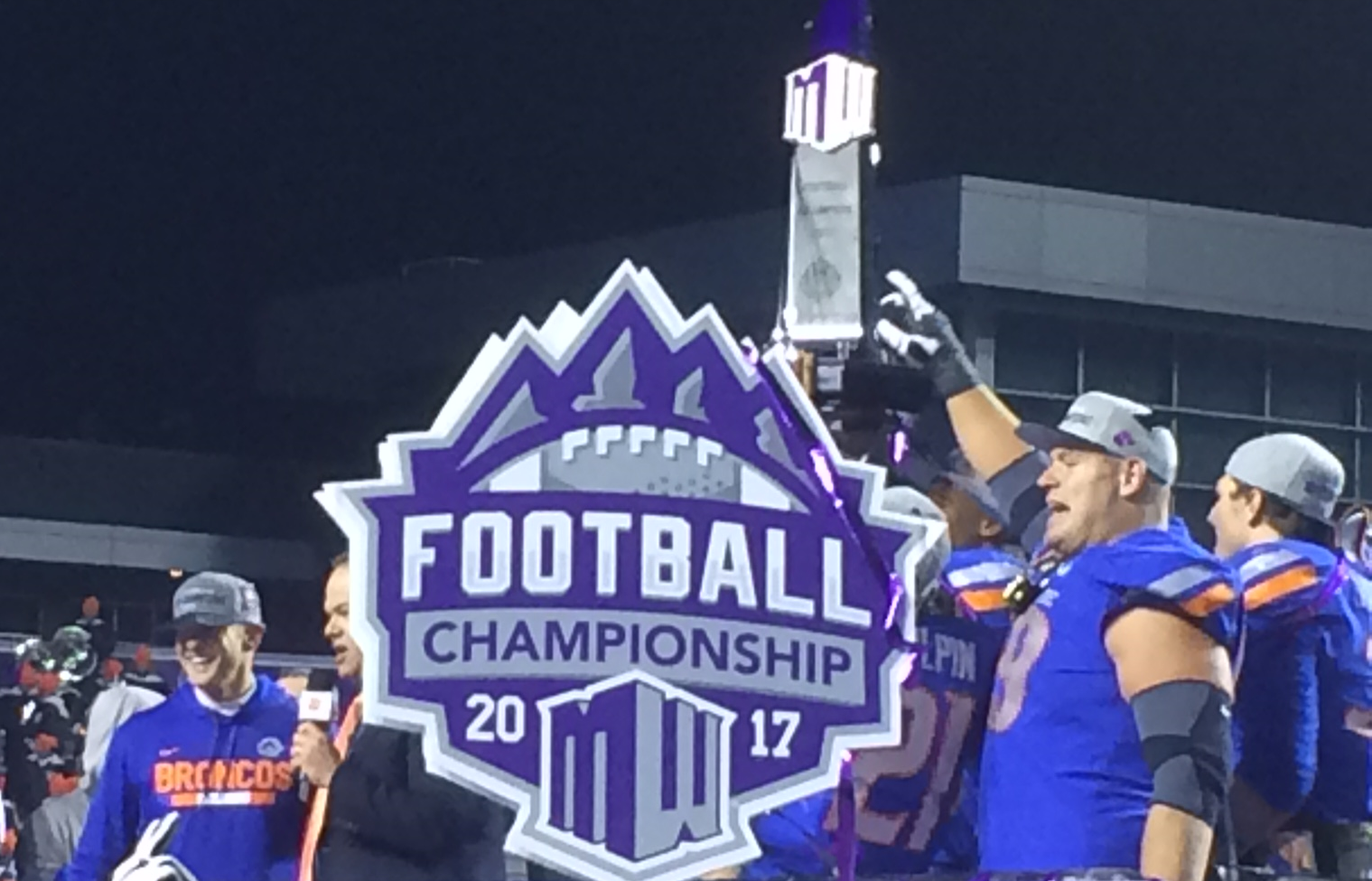
Bryan Harsin and players celebrate with the MW championship trophy.

- Passing leaders: Brett Rypien (BSU): 16–32, 246 YDS; Marcus McMaryion (FS): 16–34, 172 YDS, 1 INT.
- Rushing leaders: Ryan Wolpin (BSU): 11 CAR, 50 YDS, 1 TD; Josh Hokit (FS): 9 CAR, 46 YDS.
- Receiving leaders: Cedrick Wilson Jr. (BSU): 8 REC, 148 YDS; KeeSean Johnson (FS): 5 REC, 58 YDS.

=== vs Oregon (Las Vegas Bowl) ===
Boise State vs Oregon
(Las Vegas Bowl)

Team	1	2	3	4	Total
• No. 25 Broncos	14	10	7	7	38
Ducks	0	14	0	14	28

- Date: December 16, 2017
- Location: Sam Boyd Stadium
  Whitney, NV
- Game start: 1:30 p.m. MST
- Elapsed time: 3 hours and 30 minutes
- Game attendance: 36,432
- Game weather: Temperature: 58 °F (14 °C) • Weather: Lightly Cloudy • Wind: 1 MPH
- Referee: Adam Savoie (AAC)
- TV announcers (ABC): Rece Davis, Kirk Herbstreit and Molly McGrath (sideline)

Uniform Combination
Helmet	Jersey	Pants

- Passing leaders: Brett Rypien (BSU): 21–38, 362 YDS, 2 TD, 2 INT; Justin Herbert (UO): 26–36, 233 YDS, 2 TD, 2 INT.
- Rushing leaders: Ryan Wolpin (BSU): 23 CAR, 71 YDS, 2 TD; Justin Herbert (UO): 9 CAR, 17 YDS.
- Receiving leaders: Cedrick Wilson Jr. (BSU): 10 REC, 221 YDS, 1 TD; Dillon Mitchell (UO): 9 REC, 143 YDS.

== Rankings ==
Ranking movements Legend: ██ Increase in ranking ██ Decrease in ranking — = Not ranked RV = Received votes
	Week															
Poll	Pre	1	2	3	4	5	6	7	8	9	10	11	12	13	14	Final
AP	RV	RV	RV	—	—	—	—	—	—	RV	RV	RV	25	RV	25	22
Coaches	RV	RV	RV	RV	—	—	—	RV	RV	RV	RV	RV	24	RV	25	22
CFP	Not released									—	—	25	23	—	25	Not released

== Post-season awards ==
=== Mountain West Defensive Player of the Year ===
Leighton Vander Esch – Jr. LB

=== Mountain West first team ===
Offense

Cedrick Wilson Jr. – Sr. WR

Jake Roh – Sr. TE

Mason Hampton – Sr. OL

Defense

Curtis Weaver – Fr. DL

Leighton Vander Esch – Jr. LB

Tyler Horton – Jr. DB

=== Mountain West second team ===
Offense

Brett Rypien – Jr. QB

Archie Lewis – Sr. OL

Avery Williams – Fr. PR/KR

Defense

Jabril Frazier – Jr. DL

David Moa – Jr. DL

Kekoa Nawahine – So. DB

Sean Wale – Sr. P

=== Mountain West honorable mention ===
Ezra Cleveland – FR. OL

Haden Hoggarth – Jr. K

Alexander Mattison – So. RB

Tyson Maeva – So. LB

Durrant Miles – Jr. DL

John Molchon – So. OL

DeAndre Pierce – So. DB

Award Reference:

== Players in the 2018 NFL draft ==
Player	Position	Round	Pick	NFL club
Leighton Vander Esch	LB	1	19	Dallas Cowboys
Cedrick Wilson Jr.	WR	6	208	Dallas Cowboys
