= 2017 UNLV Rebels football team =

American college football season

2017 UNLV Rebels football
- Conference: Mountain West Conference
- West Division
- Record: 5–7 (4–4 MW)
- Head coach: Tony Sanchez (3rd season)
- Offensive coordinator: Barney Cotton (3rd season)
- Offensive scheme: Multiple
- Defensive coordinator: Kent Baer (3rd season)
- Base defense: 4–3
- Home stadium: Sam Boyd Stadium

2017 Mountain West Conference football standings
| | Conf. | | | Overall |
| Team | W | | L | W | | L |
|---|---|---|---|---|---|---|
Mountain Division
| No. 22 Boise State xy$ | 7 | – | 1 | 11 | – | 3 |
| Colorado State | 5 | – | 3 | 7 | – | 6 |
| Wyoming | 5 | – | 3 | 8 | – | 5 |
| Utah State | 4 | – | 4 | 6 | – | 7 |
| Air Force | 4 | – | 4 | 5 | – | 7 |
| New Mexico | 1 | – | 7 | 3 | – | 9 |
West Division
| Fresno State xy | 7 | – | 1 | 10 | – | 4 |
| San Diego State | 6 | – | 2 | 10 | – | 3 |
| UNLV | 4 | – | 4 | 5 | – | 7 |
| Nevada | 3 | – | 5 | 3 | – | 9 |
| Hawaii | 1 | – | 7 | 3 | – | 9 |
| San Jose State | 1 | – | 7 | 2 | – | 11 |
Championship: Boise State 17, Fresno State 14
$ – Conference champion; x – Division champion/co-champions; y – Championship game participant; Rankings from AP Poll

The 2017 UNLV Rebels football team represented the University of Nevada, Las Vegas (UNLV) as a member of the Mountain West Conference (MW) during the 2017 NCAA Division I FBS football season. Led by third-year head coach Tony Sanchez, the Rebels compiled an overall record of 5–7 record with mark of 4–4 in conference play, placing third in the MW's West Division. The team played home games at Sam Boyd Stadium in Whitney, Nevada.

Following the season, Sanchez fired defensive coordinator and linebackers coach Kent Baer and special teams and safeties coach Andy LaRussa.

== Schedule ==
| Date | Time | Opponent | Site | TV | Result | Attendance |
|---|---|---|---|---|---|---|
| September 2 | 6:00 p.m. | Howard* | Sam Boyd Stadium; Whitney, NV | Stadium | L 40–43 | 15,667 |
| September 9 | 4:00 p.m. | at Idaho* | Kibbie Dome; Moscow, ID | ESPN3 | W 44–16 | 10,156 |
| September 23 | 9:00 a.m. | at No. 10 Ohio State* | Ohio Stadium; Columbus, OH | BTN | L 21–54 | 106,187 |
| September 30 | 7:30 p.m. | San Jose State | Sam Boyd Stadium; Whitney, NV | ESPNU | W 41–13 | 15,009 |
| October 7 | 7:45 p.m. | No. 19 San Diego State | Sam Boyd Stadium; Whitney, NV | ESPN2 | L 10–41 | 19,770 |
| October 14 | 11:00 a.m. | at Air Force | Falcon Stadium; Colorado Springs, CO | ATTSNRM | L 30–34 | 26,679 |
| October 21 | 3:00 p.m. | Utah State^{†} | Sam Boyd Stadium; Whitney, NV | ATTSNRM | L 28–52 | 18,157 |
| October 28 | 7:00 p.m. | at Fresno State | Bulldog Stadium; Fresno, CA | ATTSNRM | W 26–16 | 27,922 |
| November 4 | 3:00 p.m. | Hawaii | Sam Boyd Stadium; Whitney, NV | Stadium, SPEC HI | W 31–23 | 16,278 |
| November 10 | 7:30 p.m. | BYU* | Sam Boyd Stadium; Whitney, NV | ESPN2 | L 21–31 | 19,811 |
| November 17 | 6:30 p.m. | at New Mexico | Dreamstyle Stadium; Albuquerque, NM | ESPN2 | W 38–35 | 14,744 |
| November 25 | 12:00 p.m. | at Nevada | Mackay Stadium; Reno, NV (Fremont Cannon) | ATTSNRM | L 16–23 | 17,359 |
*Non-conference game; ^{†}Homecoming; Rankings from AP Poll released prior to the game; All times are in Pacific time

== Game summaries ==
=== Howard ===
Howard at UNLV

| Team | 1 | 2 | 3 | 4 | Total |
|---|---|---|---|---|---|
| • Bison | 7 | 14 | 7 | 15 | 43 |
| Rebels | 6 | 13 | 14 | 7 | 40 |

- Date: September 2, 2017
- Location: Sam Boyd Stadium
  Whitney, NV
- Game start: 6:06 p.m. PDT
- Elapsed time: 3 hours and 29 minutes
- Game attendance: 15,667
- Game weather: Temperature: 108 °F (42 °C) • Weather: Clear and Hot • Wind: ESE 5 MPH
- Referee: Vidal Jones
- TV announcers (Stadium): Tony Cordasco and Joe Arrigo

Scoring summary
| 1 | 13:26 | HOW | Caylin Newton 52–yard run (Dakota Lebofsky kick) | HOW 7–0 |
| 1 | 11:23 | UNLV | Evan Pantels 44–yard field goal | HOW 7–3 |
| 1 | 05:36 | UNLV | Evan Pantels 28–yard field goal | HOW 7–6 |
| 2 | 12:56 | HOW | Kyle Anthony 1–yard pass from Caylin Newton (Dakota Lebofsky kick) | HOW 14–6 |
| 2 | 09:14 | UNLV | Evan Pantels 26–yard field goal | HOW 14–9 |
| 2 | 05:56 | HOW | Devin Rollins 75–yard fumble recovery (Dakota Lebofsky kick) | HOW 21–9 |
| 2 | 01:27 | UNLV | Lexington Thomas 1–yard run (Evan Pantels kick) | HOW 21–16 |
| 2 | 00:00 | UNLV | Evan Pantels 30–yard field goal | HOW 21–19 |
| 3 | 12:20 | UNLV | Devonte Boyd 25–yard pass from Armani Rogers | UNLV 26–21 |
| 3 | 06:45 | UNLV | Charles Williams 1–yard run (Evan Pantels kick) | UNLV 33–21 |
| 3 | 01:17 | HOW | Anthony Philyaw 3–yard run (Dakota Lebofsky kick) | UNLV 33–28 |
| 4 | 14:09 | HOW | Anthony Philyaw 11–yard run (Caylin Newton rush) | HOW 36–33 |
| 4 | 10:12 | UNLV | Lexington Thomas 3–yard run (Evan Pantels kick) | UNLV 40–36 |
| 4 | 07:34 | HOW | Caylin Newton 4–yard run (Dakota Lebofsky kick) | HOW 43–40 |

UNLV's season-opening loss to Howard represented the largest upset in college football history in terms of point spread. Howard was a 45-point underdog to UNLV and pulled the upset on the back of quarterback Caylin Newton, brother of NFL quarterback Cam Newton, who had 330 total offensive yards in the game.

=== At Idaho ===
UNLV at Idaho

| Team | 1 | 2 | 3 | 4 | Total |
|---|---|---|---|---|---|
| • Rebels | 7 | 3 | 24 | 10 | 44 |
| Vandals | 0 | 3 | 7 | 6 | 16 |

- Date: September 9, 2017
- Location: Kibbie Dome
  Moscow, ID
- Game start: 5:05 p.m. MDT
- Elapsed time: 3 hours and 6 minutes
- Game attendance: 10,156
- Game weather: Temperature: 70 °F (21 °C) • Weather: Played Indoors • Wind: None
- Referee: Jason Autrey
- TV announcers (ESPN3): Peter Young and Darius Walker

Scoring summary
| 1 | 06:59 | UNLV | Armani Rogers 1–yard run (Evan Pantels kick) | UNLV 7–0 |
| 2 | 09:32 | UNLV | Evan Pantels 40–yard field goal | UNLV 10–0 |
| 2 | 03:37 | IDAHO | Cade Coffey 40–yard field goal | UNLV 10–3 |
| 3 | 13:56 | UNLV | Lexington Thomas 60–yard run (Evan Pantels kick) | UNLV 17–3 |
| 3 | 12:17 | UNLV | Lexington Thomas 1–yard run (Evan Pantels kick) | UNLV 24–3 |
| 3 | 07:51 | UNLV | Evan Pantels 22–yard field goal | UNLV 27–3 |
| 3 | 03:51 | IDAHO | Matt Linehan 1–yard run (Cade Coffey kick) | UNLV 27–10 |
| 3 | 01:36 | UNLV | Lexington Thomas 62–yard run (Evan Pantels kick) | UNLV 34–10 |
| 4 | 14:51 | IDAHO | Reuben Mwehla 4–yard pass from Matt Linehan (Cade Coffey kick failed) | UNLV 34–16 |
| 4 | 13:53 | UNLV | Devonte Boyd 94–yard pass from Armani Rogers (Evan Pantels kick) | UNLV 41–16 |
| 4 | 02:16 | UNLV | Evan Pantels 27–yard field goal | UNLV 44–16 |

=== At Ohio State ===
UNLV at Ohio State

| Team | 1 | 2 | 3 | 4 | Total |
|---|---|---|---|---|---|
| Rebels | 0 | 7 | 7 | 7 | 21 |
| • No. 10 Buckeyes | 16 | 28 | 10 | 0 | 54 |

- Date: September 23, 2017
- Location: Ohio Stadium
  Columbus, OH
- Game start: 12:01 p.m. EDT
- Elapsed time: 3 hours and 17 minutes
- Game attendance: 106,187
- Game weather: Temperature: 93 °F (34 °C) • Weather: Clear Skies • Wind: ENE 8 MPH
- Referee: Ron Snodgrass
- TV announcers (BTN): Kevin Kugler, Matt Millen and Lisa Byington (sideline)

Scoring summary
| 1 | 11:49 | OSU | Parris Campbell 69–yard pass from J. T. Barrett (Sean Nuernberger kick) | OSU 7–0 |
| 1 | 05:15 | OSU | Johnnie Dixon 16–yard pass from J. T. Barrett (Sean Nuernberger kick) | OSU 14–0 |
| 1 | 01:02 | OSU | Team safety | OSU 16–0 |
| 2 | 14:50 | OSU | Binjimen Victor 3–yard pass from J. T. Barrett (Sean Nuernberger kick) | OSU 23–0 |
| 2 | 12:39 | OSU | Terry McLaurin 4–yard pass from J. T. Barrett (Sean Nuernberger kick) | OSU 30–0 |
| 2 | 08:58 | OSU | K. J. Hill 11–yard pass from J. T. Barrett (Sean Nuernberger kick) | OSU 37–0 |
| 2 | 03:32 | UNLV | Lexington Thomas 2–yard run (Evan Pantels kick) | OSU 37–7 |
| 2 | 01:32 | OSU | C. J. Saunders 28–yard pass from Dwayne Haskins (Sean Nuernberger kick) | OSU 44–7 |
| 3 | 08:46 | UNLV | Lexington Thomas 55–yard run (Evan Pantels kick) | OSU 44–14 |
| 3 | 05:36 | OSU | Sean Nuernberger 30–yard field goal | OSU 47–14 |
| 3 | 02:55 | OSU | Rashod Berry 38–yard pass from Dwayne Haskins (Sean Nuernberger kick) | OSU 54–14 |
| 4 | 13:00 | UNLV | Javin White 65–yard interception return (Daniel Gutierrez kick) | OSU 54–17 |

=== San Jose State ===
San Jose State at UNLV

| Team | 1 | 2 | 3 | 4 | Total |
|---|---|---|---|---|---|
| Spartans | 3 | 10 | 0 | 0 | 13 |
| • Rebels | 14 | 21 | 6 | 0 | 41 |

- Date: September 30, 2017
- Location: Sam Boyd Stadium
  Whitney, NV
- Game start: 7:30 p.m. PDT
- Elapsed time: 3 hours and 18 minutes
- Game attendance: 15,009
- Game weather: Temperature: 86 °F (30 °C) • Weather: Clear • Wind: SW 9 MPH
- Referee: Kevin Hassell
- TV announcers (ESPNU): Roy Philpott and Tom Ramsey

Scoring summary
| 1 | 11:28 | UNLV | Armani Rogers 7–yard run (Evan Pantels kick) | UNLV 7–0 |
| 1 | 09:16 | SJSU | Bryce Crawford 28–yard field goal | UNLV 7–3 |
| 1 | 03:50 | UNLV | Armani Rogers 7–yard run (Evan Pantels kick) | UNLV 14–3 |
| 2 | 08:53 | SJSU | Bryce Crawford 23–yard field goal | UNLV 14–6 |
| 2 | 07:50 | UNLV | Lexington Thomas 56–yard run (Evan Pantels kick) | UNLV 21–6 |
| 2 | 03:36 | UNLV | Brandon Presley 44–yard pass from Armani Rogers (Daniel Gutierrez kick) | UNLV 28–6 |
| 2 | 02:20 | UNLV | Lexington Thomas 1–yard run (Daniel Gutierrez kick) | UNLV 35–6 |
| 2 | 00:09 | SJSU | JaQuan Blackwell 11–yard pass from Josh Love (Bryce Crawford kick) | UNLV 35–13 |
| 3 | 03:29 | UNLV | Trevor Kanteman 1–yard pass from Armani Rogers (Daniel Gutierrez kick failed) | UNLV 41–13 |

=== San Diego State ===
San Diego State at UNLV

| Team | 1 | 2 | 3 | 4 | Total |
|---|---|---|---|---|---|
| • No. 19 Aztecs | 3 | 17 | 7 | 14 | 41 |
| Rebels | 3 | 7 | 0 | 0 | 10 |

- Date: October 7, 2017
- Location: Sam Boyd Stadium
  Whitney, NV
- Game start: 7:50 p.m. PDT
- Elapsed time: 3 hours and 10 minutes
- Game attendance: 19,770
- Game weather: Temperature: 79 °F (26 °C) • Weather: Calm and Clear Skies • Wind: E 2 MPH
- Referee: Kevin Boitmann
- TV announcers (ESPN2): Clay Matvick and Kirk Morrison

Scoring summary
| 1 | 02:57 | SDSU | John Baron II 27–yard field goal | SDSU 3–0 |
| 1 | 00:26 | UNLV | Daniel Gutierrez 35–yard field goal | TIE 3–3 |
| 2 | 11:57 | SDSU | Christian Chapman 14–yard run (John Baron II kick) | SDSU 10–3 |
| 2 | 10:04 | SDSU | Juwan Washington 34–yard run (John Baron II kick) | SDSU 17–3 |
| 2 | 05:48 | UNLV | Kendal Keys 6–yard pass from Armani Rogers (Daniel Gutierrez kick) | SDSU 17–10 |
| 2 | 00:21 | SDSU | John Baron II 33–yard field goal | SDSU 20–10 |
| 3 | 07:29 | SDSU | Rashaad Penny 3–yard run (John Baron II kick) | SDSU 27–10 |
| 4 | 07:11 | SDSU | Rashaad Penny 2–yard run (John Baron II kick) | SDSU 34–10 |
| 4 | 01:40 | SDSU | Chase Jasmin 8–yard run (John Baron II kick) | SDSU 41–10 |

=== At Air Force ===
UNLV at Air Force

| Team | 1 | 2 | 3 | 4 | Total |
|---|---|---|---|---|---|
| Rebels | 17 | 10 | 3 | 0 | 30 |
| • Falcons | 0 | 7 | 13 | 14 | 34 |

- Date: October 14, 2017
- Location: Falcon Stadium
  Colorado Springs, CO
- Game start: 12:08 p.m. MDT
- Elapsed time: 3 hours and 7 minutes
- Game attendance: 26,679
- Game weather: Temperature: N/A • Weather: N/A • Wind: N/A
- Referee: David Alvarez
- TV announcers (ATTSNRM): Brad Thompson, Sherdrick Bonner and J. J. Raterink (sideline)

Scoring summary
| 1 | 13:02 | UNLV | Lexington Thomas 55–yard run (Evan Pantels kick) | UNLV 7–0 |
| 1 | 01:28 | UNLV | Xzaviar Campbell 1–yard run (Evan Pantels kick) | UNLV 14–0 |
| 1 | 00:16 | UNLV | Evan Pantels 40–yard field goal | UNLV 17–0 |
| 2 | 08:37 | UNLV | Evan Pantels 27–yard field goal | UNLV 20–0 |
| 2 | 03:28 | UNLV | Armani Rogers 3–yard run (Evan Pantels kick) | UNLV 27–0 |
| 2 | 00:42 | AF | Arion Worthman 14–yard run (Luke Strebel kick) | UNLV 27–7 |
| 3 | 12:00 | UNLV | Evan Pantels 34–yard field goal | UNLV 30–7 |
| 3 | 08:02 | AF | Arion Worthman 1–yard run (Luke Strebel kick) | UNLV 30–14 |
| 3 | 03:21 | AF | Arion Worthman 5–yard run (pass failed) | UNLV 30–20 |
| 4 | 12:52 | AF | Arion Worthman 6–yard run (Luke Strebel kick) | UNLV 30–27 |
| 4 | 02:14 | AF | Arion Worthman 1–yard run (Lake Strebel kick) | AF 34–30 |

=== Utah State ===
Utah State at UNLV

| Team | 1 | 2 | 3 | 4 | Total |
|---|---|---|---|---|---|
| • Aggies | 7 | 21 | 7 | 17 | 52 |
| Rebels | 14 | 14 | 0 | 0 | 28 |

- Date: October 21, 2017
- Location: Sam Boyd Stadium
  Whitney, NV
- Game start: 3:08 p.m. PDT
- Elapsed time: 3 hours and 10 minutes
- Game attendance: 18,157
- Game weather: Temperature: 75 °F (24 °C) • Weather: Breezy and Clear Skies • Wind: N 6 MPH
- Referee: Michael VanderVelde
- TV announcers (ATTSNRM): Drew Goodman, Sherdrick Bonner and Caleb Herring (sideline)

Scoring summary
| 1 | 06:49 | UNLV | Lexington Thomas 14–yard run (Daniel Gutierrez kick) | UNLV 7–0 |
| 1 | 02:32 | UNLV | Armani Rogers 6–yard run (Daniel Gutierrez kick) | UNLV 14–0 |
| 1 | 01:56 | USU | Savon Scarver 70–yard pass from Jordan Love (Dominik Eberle kick) | UNLV 14–7 |
| 2 | 13:58 | UNLV | Lexington Thomas 41–yard run (Daniel Gutierrez kick) | UNLV 21–7 |
| 2 | 12:51 | USU | LaJuan Hunt 13–yard run (Dominik Eberle kick) | UNLV 21–14 |
| 2 | 06:05 | UNLV | Armani Rogers 7–yard run (Daniel Gutierrez kick) | UNLV 28–14 |
| 2 | 05:54 | USU | Jordan Nathan 75–yard pass from Jordan Love (Dominik Eberle kick) | UNLV 28–21 |
| 2 | 02:28 | USU | LaJuan Hunt 1–yard run (Dominik Eberle kick) | TIE 28–28 |
| 3 | 06:38 | USU | Jordan Love 5–yard run (Dominik Eberle kick) | USU 35–28 |
| 4 | 14:15 | USU | LaJuan Hunt 30–yard run (Dominik Eberle kick) | USU 42–28 |
| 4 | 10:53 | USU | Dominik Eberle 24–yard field goal | USU 45–28 |
| 4 | 00:59 | USU | Justen Hervey 7–yard run (Dominik Eberle kick) | USU 52–28 |

=== At Fresno State ===
UNLV at Fresno State

| Team | 1 | 2 | 3 | 4 | Total |
|---|---|---|---|---|---|
| • Rebels | 3 | 6 | 7 | 10 | 26 |
| Bulldogs | 9 | 0 | 7 | 0 | 16 |

- Date: October 28, 2017
- Location: Bulldog Stadium
  Fresno, CA
- Game start: 7:08 p.m. PDT
- Elapsed time: 2 hours and 50 minutes
- Game attendance: 27,922
- Game weather: Temperature: 77 °F (25 °C) • Weather: Clear and Crisp • Wind: 2 MPH
- Referee: Daniel Romeo
- TV announcers (ATTSNRM): Drew Goodman, Sherdrick Bonner and Brad Thompson (sideline)

Scoring summary
| 1 | 09:50 | FS | Jordan Mims 3–yard run (Jimmy Camacho kick failed) | FS 6–0 |
| 1 | 05:58 | UNLV | Daniel Gutierrez 38–yard field goal | FS 6–3 |
| 1 | 02:58 | FS | Jimmy Camacho 34–yard field goal | FS 9–3 |
| 2 | 10:18 | UNLV | Daniel Gutierrez 27–yard field goal | FS 9–6 |
| 2 | 00:06 | UNLV | Daniel Gutierrez 23–yard field goal | TIE 9–9 |
| 3 | 09:31 | UNLV | Johnny Stanton 7–yard run (Daniel Gutierrez kick) | UNLV 16–9 |
| 3 | 03:38 | FS | Jordan Mims 5–yard run (Jimmy Camacho kick) | TIE 16–16 |
| 4 | 14:53 | UNLV | Lexington Thomas 2–yard run (Daniel Gutierrez kick) | UNLV 23–16 |
| 4 | 05:00 | UNLV | Daniel Gutierrez 25–yard field goal | UNLV 26–16 |

=== Hawaii ===
Hawaii at UNLV

| Team | 1 | 2 | 3 | 4 | Total |
|---|---|---|---|---|---|
| Rainbow Warriors | 0 | 6 | 7 | 10 | 23 |
| • Rebels | 7 | 0 | 21 | 3 | 31 |

- Date: November 4, 2017
- Location: Sam Boyd Stadium
  Whitney, NV
- Game start: 3:00 p.m. PDT
- Elapsed time: 3 hours and 35 minutes
- Game attendance: 16,278
- Game weather: Temperature: 75 °F (24 °C) • Weather: Beautiful and Clear • Wind: S 16 MPH
- Referee: Kevin Hassell
- TV announcers (Stadium/SPEC HI): Robert Kekaula and Rich Miano

Scoring summary
| 1 | 11:01 | UNLV | Johnny Stanton 4–yard run (Evan Pantels kick) | UNLV 7–0 |
| 2 | 06:16 | UH | Alex Trifonovitch 31–yard field goal | UNLV 7–3 |
| 2 | 00:17 | UH | Alex Trifonovitch 38–yard field goal | UNLV 7–6 |
| 3 | 09:53 | UH | Dylan Collie 20–yard pass from Dru Brown (Alex Trifonovitch kick) | UH 13–7 |
| 3 | 08:22 | UNLV | Brandon Presley 52–yard pass from Johnny Stanton (Evan Pantels kick) | UNLV 14–13 |
| 3 | 01:40 | UNLV | Kendal Keys 10–yard pass from Johnny Stanton (Evan Pantels kick) | UNLV 21–13 |
| 3 | 00:23 | UNLV | Lexington Thomas 3–yard run (Evan Pantels kick) | UNLV 28–13 |
| 4 | 11:46 | UH | Diocemy Saint Juste 2–yard run (Alex Trifonovitch kick) | UNLV 28–20 |
| 4 | 04:53 | UNLV | Evan Pantels 32–yard field goal | UNLV 31–20 |
| 4 | 02:15 | UH | Alex Trifonovitch 27–yard field goal | UNLV 31–23 |

=== BYU ===
BYU at UNLV

| Team | 1 | 2 | 3 | 4 | Total |
|---|---|---|---|---|---|
| • Cougars | 0 | 14 | 14 | 3 | 31 |
| Rebels | 0 | 7 | 7 | 7 | 21 |

- Date: November 10, 2017
- Location: Sam Boyd Stadium
  Whitney, NV
- Game start: 7:30 p.m. PST
- Elapsed time: 3 hours and 18 minutes
- Game attendance: 19,811
- Game weather: Temperature: 67 °F (19 °C) • Weather: Breezy and Clear • Wind: SSW 8 MPH
- Referee: Scott Campbell
- TV announcers (ESPN2): Adam Amin, Dusty Dvoracek and Molly McGrath (sideline)

Scoring summary
| 2 | 09:06 | BYU | Brayden El-Bakri 1–yard run (Rhett Almond kick) | BYU 7–0 |
| 2 | 04:25 | UNLV | Lexington Thomas 1–yard run (Evan Pantels kick) | TIE 7–7 |
| 2 | 00:27 | BYU | Aleva Hifo 11–yard pass from Joe Critchlow (Rhett Almond kick) | BYU 14–7 |
| 3 | 13:04 | BYU | Squally Canada 2–yard run (Rhett Almond kick) | BYU 21–7 |
| 3 | 04:23 | UNLV | Brandon Presley 18–yard pass from Johnny Stanton (Evan Pantels kick) | BYU 21–14 |
| 3 | 01:40 | BYU | Austin Kafentzis 11–yard run (Rhett Almond kick) | BYU 28–14 |
| 4 | 10:46 | UNLV | Devonte Boyd 13–yard pass from Johnny Stanton (Evan Pantels kick) | BYU 28–21 |
| 4 | 05:39 | BYU | Rhett Almond 28–yard field goal | BYU 31–21 |

=== At New Mexico ===
UNLV at New Mexico

| Team | 1 | 2 | 3 | 4 | Total |
|---|---|---|---|---|---|
| • Rebels | 10 | 14 | 3 | 11 | 38 |
| Lobos | 0 | 14 | 7 | 14 | 35 |

- Date: November 17, 2017
- Location: Dreamstyle Stadium
  Albuquerque, NM
- Game start: 7:35 p.m. MST
- Elapsed time: 3 hours and 20 minutes
- Game attendance: 14,744
- Game weather: Temperature: 58 °F (14 °C) • Weather: Mostly Cloudy • Wind: W 17 MPH
- Referee: Stephen Baron
- TV announcers (ESPN2): Adam Amin, Dusty Dvoracek and Molly McGrath (sideline)

Scoring summary
| 1 | 10:50 | UNLV | Evan Pantels 40–yard field goal | UNLV 3–0 |
| 1 | 03:11 | UNLV | Lexington Thomas 14–yard run (Evan Pantels kick) | UNLV 10–0 |
| 2 | 12:00 | NM | Romell Jordan 8–yard run (Jason Sanders kick) | UNLV 10–7 |
| 2 | 03:26 | NM | Daryl Chestnut Jr. 1–yard run (Jason Sanders kick) | NM 14–10 |
| 2 | 02:43 | UNLV | Lexington Thomas 60–yard run (Evan Pantels kick) | UNLV 17–14 |
| 2 | 01:12 | UNLV | Armani Rogers 83–yard run (Evan Pantels kick) | UNLV 24–14 |
| 3 | 12:23 | NM | Lamar Jordan II 40–yard run (Jason Sanders kick) | UNLV 24–21 |
| 3 | 06:39 | UNLV | Evan Pantels 22–yard field goal | UNLV 27–21 |
| 4 | 09:17 | NM | Tyrone Owens 2–yard run (Jason Sanders kick) | NM 28–27 |
| 4 | 06:11 | UNLV | Evan Pantels 40–yard field goal | UNLV 30–28 |
| 4 | 01:11 | NM | Lamar Jordan II 41–yard run (Jason Sanders kick) | NM 35–30 |
| 4 | 00:25 | UNLV | Kendal Keys 14–yard pass from Armani Rogers (pass) | UNLV 38–35 |

=== At Nevada ===
UNLV at Nevada

| Team | 1 | 2 | 3 | 4 | Total |
|---|---|---|---|---|---|
| Rebels | 0 | 13 | 3 | 0 | 16 |
| • Wolf Pack | 6 | 3 | 7 | 7 | 23 |

- Date: November 25, 2017
- Location: Mackay Stadium
  Reno, NV
- Game start: 12:08 p.m. PST
- Elapsed time: 2 hours and 56 minutes
- Game attendance: 17,359
- Game weather: Temperature: 62 °F (17 °C) • Weather: Partly Cloudy • Wind: SE 4 MPH
- Referee: Michael VanderVelde
- TV announcers (ATTSNRM): Drew Goodman, Sherdrick Bonner and Brad Thompson (sideline)

Scoring summary
| 1 | 14:03 | NEV | Wyatt Demps 21–yard pass from Ty Gangi (Spencer Pettit kick blocked) | NEV 6–0 |
| 2 | 14:47 | UNLV | Armani Rogers 12–yard run (Evan Pantels kick) | UNLV 7–6 |
| 2 | 08:56 | UNLV | Evan Pantels 24–yard field goal | UNLV 10–6 |
| 2 | 02:03 | UNLV | Evan Pantels 37–yard field goal | UNLV 13–6 |
| 2 | 00:21 | NEV | Spencer Pettit 35–yard field goal | UNLV 13–9 |
| 3 | 10:57 | UNLV | Evan Pantels 53–yard field goal | UNLV 16–9 |
| 3 | 00:41 | NEV | Trevion Armstrong 6–yard pass from Ty Gangi (Spencer Pettit kick) | TIE 16–16 |
| 4 | 07:34 | NEV | Kelton Moore 1–yard run (Spencer Pettit kick) | NEV 23–16 |
