= 2017 Las Vegas Bowl =

- 26th Las Vegas Bowl
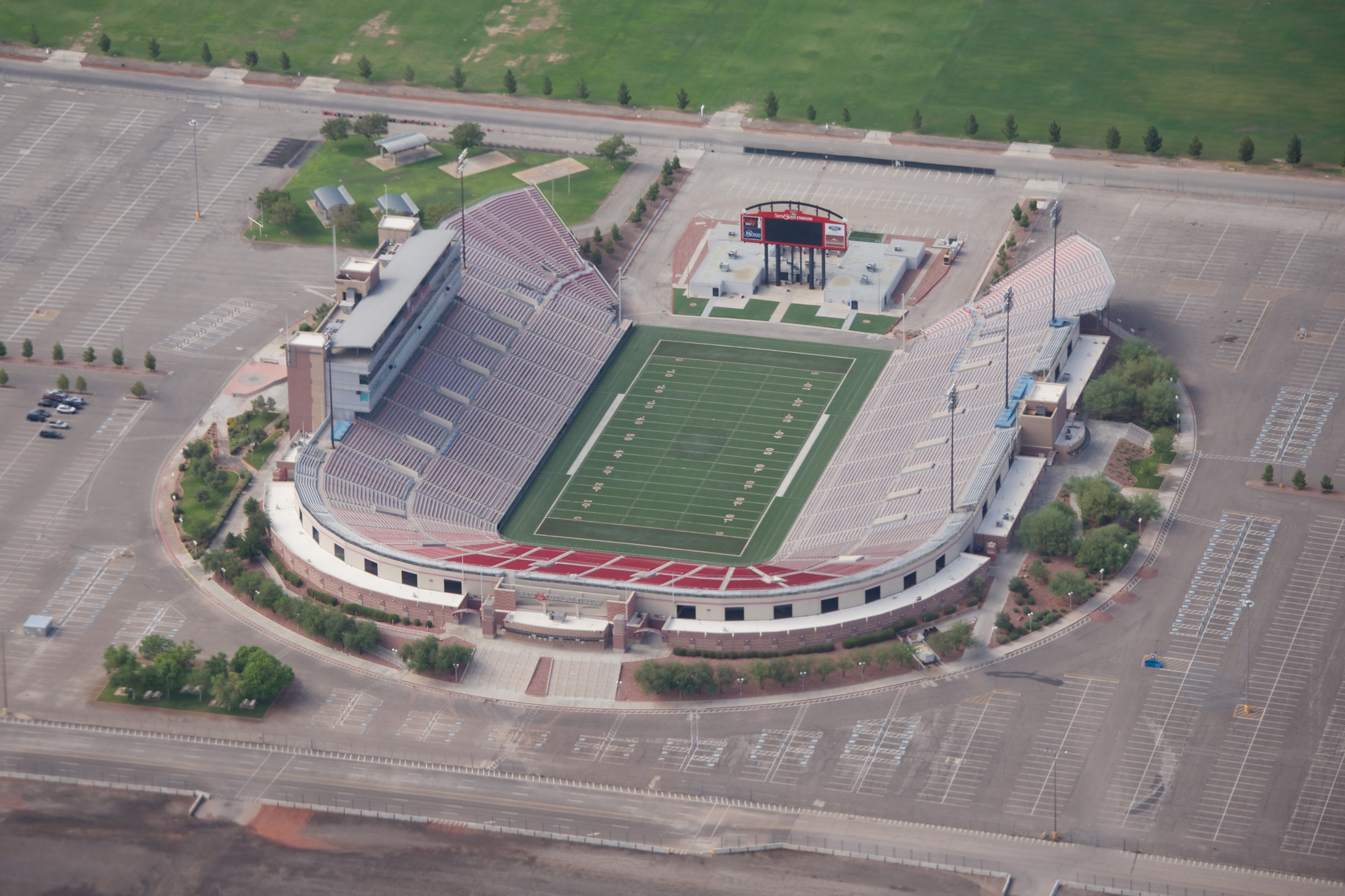
- Sam Boyd Stadium in Whitney, Nevada, hosted the Las Vegas Bowl.
Boise State Broncos	Oregon Ducks
(10–3)	(7–5)
Mountain West	Pac-12
38	28
Head coach: Bryan Harsin	Head coach: Mario Cristobal
AP / Coaches / CFP; 25 / 25 / 25
	1	2	3	4	Total
Boise State	14	10	7	7	38
Oregon	0	14	0	14	28
- Date: December 16, 2017
- Season: 2017
- Stadium: Sam Boyd Stadium
- Location: Whitney, Nevada
- MVP: Boise State WR Cedrick Wilson Jr.
- Referee: Adam Savoie (American)
- Attendance: 36,432
- Payout: US$2,800,000

United States TV coverage
- Network: ABC
- Announcers: Rece Davis, Kirk Herbstreit, Molly McGrath

The 2017 Las Vegas Bowl was a college football bowl game played on December 16, 2017, at Sam Boyd Stadium in Whitney, Nevada. The twenty-sixth annual Las Vegas Bowl was one of the 2017–18 bowl games that concludes the 2017 NCAA Division I FBS football season. The game aired on ABC.

== Team selection ==
The game featured teams from the Mountain West Conference and Pac-12 Conference. The representative from Mountain West was Boise State, who qualified for the bowl by winning the 2017 Mountain West Conference Football Championship Game. The Pac-12 representative was Oregon. This was Boise State's fourth trip to the Las Vegas Bowl, while it was Oregon's third.

This was the third meeting between the schools, with Boise State having won both previous meeting. The most recent prior meeting was on September 3, 2009, when the Broncos defeated the Ducks by a score of 19–8.

=== Boise State ===
Boise State finished the regular season 10–3 overall and 7–1 in Mountain West play, to finish in first place in the Mountain Division. They defeated Fresno State in the Mountain West Championship Game to become Mountain West champions.

=== Oregon ===
Oregon finished the regular season with a record of 7–5 overall and 4–5 in Pac-12 play, to finish in fourth place in the North Division. The Ducks were led by head coach Mario Cristobal after it was announced on December 5 that head coach Willie Taggart had accepted the head coaching position at Florida State.

== Game summary ==
=== Scoring summary ===
Scoring summary

Quarter	Time	Drive			Team	Scoring information	Score	
Quarter	Time	Plays	Yards	TOP	Team	Scoring information	BSU	ORE
1	8:17	13	67	5:12	BSU	Ryan Wolpin 1-yard touchdown run, Hayden Hoggarth kick good	7	0
1	1:21	3	32	1:17	BSU	Cedrick Wilson Jr. 26-yard touchdown reception from Brett Rypien, Hayden Hoggarth kick good	14	0
2	8:59	12	62	3:56	BSU	39-yard field goal by Hayden Hoggarth	17	0
2	5:11				BSU	Interception returned 53 yards for touchdown by Kekaula Kaniho, Hayden Hoggarth kick good	24	0
2	0:37				ORE	Fumble recovery returned 86 yards for touchdown by Troy Dye, Aidan Schneider kick good	24	7
2	0:07				ORE	Interception returned 100 yards for touchdown by Tyree Robinson, Aidan Schneider kick good	24	14
3	9:41	12	75	5:19	BSU	Alec Dhaenens 13-yard touchdown reception from Brett Rypiens, Hayden Hoggarth kick good	31	14
4	10:07	8	78	1:54	ORE	Brenden Schooler 24-yard touchdown reception from Justin Herbert, Aidan Schneider kick good	31	21
4	2:22	11	86	5:19	BSU	Ryan Wolpin 1-yard touchdown run, Hayden Hoggarth kick good	38	21
4	1:12	4	75	1:10	ORE	Jaylon Redd 8-yard touchdown reception from Justin Herbert, Aidan Schneider kick good	38	28
"TOP" = time of possession. For other American football terms, see Glossary of American football.							38	28

=== Statistics ===
	1	2	3	4	Total
No. 25 Broncos	14	10	7	7	38
Ducks	0	14	0	14	28

Statistics	BSU	ORE
First downs	28	14
Plays–yards	90–476	64–280
Rushes–yards	47–107	28–47
Passing yards	369	233
Passing: Comp–Att–Int	23–43–2	26–36–2
Time of possession	36:36	23:24

Team	Category	Player	Statistics
Boise State	Passing	Brett Rypien	21/38, 362 yds, 2 TD, 2 INT
Boise State	Rushing	Ryan Wolpin	23 car, 71 yds, 2 TD
Boise State	Receiving	Cedrick Wilson Jr.	10 rec, 221 yds, 1 TD
Oregon	Passing	Justin Herbert	26/36, 233 yds, 2 TD, 2 INT
Oregon	Rushing	Justin Herbert	9 car, 17 yds
Oregon	Receiving	Dillon Mitchell	9 rec, 143 yds
