= 2017 Colorado State Rams football team =

American college football season

2017 Colorado State Rams football

New Mexico Bowl, L 28–31 vs. Marshall
- Conference: Mountain West Conference
- Mountain Division
- Record: 7–6 (5–3 MW)
- Head coach: Mike Bobo (3rd season)
- Offensive coordinator: Will Friend (3rd season)
- Offensive scheme: Pro-style
- Defensive coordinator: Marty English (5th season)
- Base defense: 4–3
- Home stadium: Colorado State Stadium

Uniform
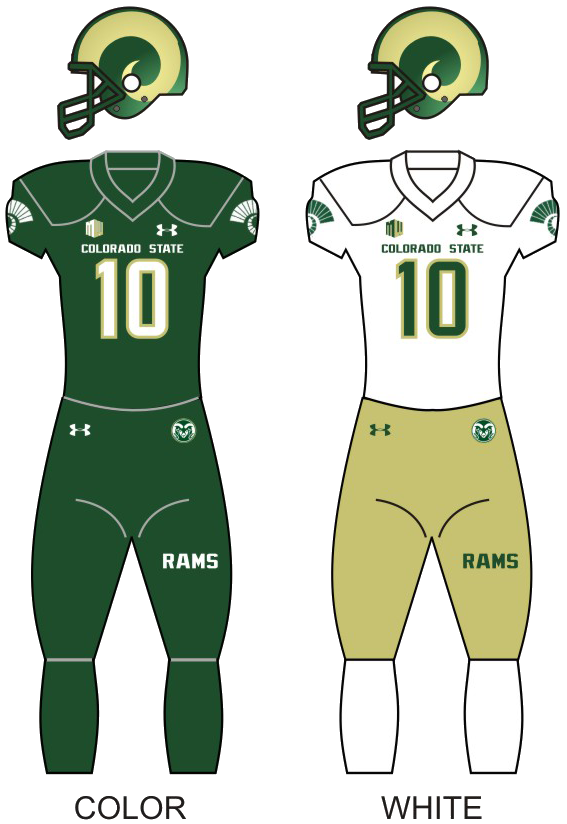

2017 Mountain West Conference football standings
	Conf.			Overall
Team	W		L	W		L
Mountain Division
No. 22 Boise State xy$	7	–	1	11	–	3
Colorado State	5	–	3	7	–	6
Wyoming	5	–	3	8	–	5
Utah State	4	–	4	6	–	7
Air Force	4	–	4	5	–	7
New Mexico	1	–	7	3	–	9
West Division
Fresno State xy	7	–	1	10	–	4
San Diego State	6	–	2	10	–	3
UNLV	4	–	4	5	–	7
Nevada	3	–	5	3	–	9
Hawaii	1	–	7	3	–	9
San Jose State	1	–	7	2	–	11
Championship: Boise State 17, Fresno State 14
$ – Conference champion; x – Division champion/co-champions; y – Championship game participant; Rankings from AP Poll

The 2017 Colorado State Rams football team represented Colorado State University during the 2017 NCAA Division I FBS football season. The Rams were led by third-year head coach Mike Bobo and played their home games at the newly built Sonny Lubick Field at Colorado State Stadium in Fort Collins, Colorado as members of the Mountain Division of the Mountain West Conference. They finished the season 7–6, 5–3 in Mountain West play to finish in a tie for second place in the Mountain Division. They were invited to the New Mexico Bowl where they lost to Marshall.

== Preseason ==
In the preseason media poll that was revealed at the Mountain West Media Summit on July 25, 2017, the Rams were picked to finish second in the Mountain Division behind Boise State. WR Michael Gallup and OL Jake Bennett Mountain West Football Preseason All-Conference Team.

== Schedule ==
Colorado State announced their 2017 football schedule on March 2, 2017.

Date	Time	Opponent	Site	TV	Result	Attendance
August 26	1:00 p.m.	Oregon State*	Colorado State Stadium; Fort Collins, CO	CBSSN	W 58–27	37,583
September 1	6:00 p.m.	vs. Colorado*	Sports Authority Field at Mile High; Denver, CO (Rocky Mountain Showdown)	P12N	L 3–17	73,932
September 9	1:30 p.m.	Abilene Christian*	Colorado State Stadium; Fort Collins, CO	Stadium	W 38–10	27,038
September 16	5:00 p.m.	at No. 1 Alabama*	Bryant–Denny Stadium; Tuscaloosa, AL	ESPN2	L 23–41	101,821
September 30	10:00 p.m.	at Hawaii	Aloha Stadium; Honolulu, HI	Spectrum OC16/Stadium	W 51–21	25,687
October 7	2:30 p.m.	at Utah State	Maverik Stadium; Logan, UT	ATTSNRM	W 27–14	18,004
October 14	8:15 p.m.	Nevada^{†}	Colorado State Stadium; Fort Collins, CO	ESPN2	W 44–42	36,765
October 20	8:15 p.m.	at New Mexico	Dreamstyle Stadium; Albuquerque, NM	ESPN2	W 27–24	17,358
October 28	1:00 p.m.	Air Force	Colorado State Stadium; Fort Collins, CO (Ram–Falcon Trophy)	CBSSN	L 28–45	33,074
November 4	5:00 p.m.	at Wyoming	War Memorial Stadium; Laramie, WY (Bronze Boot)	CBSSN	L 13–16	22,840
November 11	8:30 p.m.	Boise State	Colorado State Stadium; Fort Collins, CO	CBSSN	L 52–59 ^{OT}	32,166
November 18	1:30 p.m.	San Jose State	Colorado State Stadium; Fort Collins, CO	CBSSN	W 42–14	25,743
December 16	2:30 p.m.	vs. Marshall*	Dreamstyle Stadium; Albuquerque, NM (New Mexico Bowl)	ESPN	L 28–31	26,087
*Non-conference game; ^{†}Homecoming; Rankings from AP Poll released prior to the game; All times are in Mountain time

== Game summaries ==
=== Oregon State ===
	1	2	3	4	Total
Beavers	10	10	0	7	27
Rams	7	17	10	24	58

=== vs Colorado ===
	1	2	3	4	Total
Buffaloes	10	7	0	0	17
Rams	0	3	0	0	3

=== Abilene Christian ===
	1	2	3	4	Total
Wildcats	0	0	10	0	10
Rams	10	7	14	7	38

=== At Alabama ===
	1	2	3	4	Total
Rams	0	10	0	13	23
No. 1 Crimson Tide	17	7	14	3	41

=== At Hawaii ===
	1	2	3	4	Total
Rams	14	17	13	7	51
Rainbow Warriors	0	7	7	7	21

=== At Utah State ===
	1	2	3	4	Total
Rams	17	7	0	3	27
Aggies	0	7	0	7	14

=== Nevada ===
	1	2	3	4	Total
Wolf Pack	14	7	21	0	42
Rams	14	14	10	6	44

=== At New Mexico ===
	1	2	3	4	Total
Rams	0	21	0	6	27
Lobos	7	3	7	7	24

=== Air Force ===
	1	2	3	4	Total
Falcons	7	21	3	14	45
Rams	14	7	7	0	28

=== At Wyoming ===
	1	2	3	4	Total
Rams	3	7	0	3	13
Cowboys	0	6	3	7	16

=== Boise State ===
	1	2	3	4	OT	Total
Broncos	3	14	21	14	7	59
Rams	21	14	7	10	0	52

=== San Jose State ===
	1	2	3	4	Total
Spartans	7	0	0	7	14
Rams	14	14	7	7	42

=== vs Marshall ===
	1	2	3	4	Total
Thundering Herd	0	21	10	0	31
Rams	0	14	0	14	28

== Roster ==
2017 Colorado State Rams football team roster
Players
Coaches
Offense

Pos.	#	Name	Class
RB	1	Dalyn Dawkins	Sr
WR	2	Robert Awunganyi	So
QB	2	Justice McCoy	Fr
WR	3	EJ Scott	Fr
WR	4	Michael Gallup	Sr
RB	5	Marvin Kinsey Jr.	So
RB	6	Darius May	Fr
QB	7	Nick Stevens	Sr
WR	8	Detrich Clark	Sr
WR	9	Warren Jackson	Fr
QB	10	J.C. Robles	So
WR	11	Preston Williams	Jr
QB	12	Judd Erickson	Fr
QB	15	Collin Hill	So
TE	16	Cameron Butler	Fr
WR	18	Darius Wise	Fr
WR	19	Tyler Smith	Fr
WR	23	Marcus Wilson	Jr
RB	24	Izzy Matthews	Jr
WR	26	Alex Tennant	So
WR	27	Trey Smith	Jr
RB	28	Rashaad Boddie	Fr
TE	30	Dalton Fackrell	Sr
RB	32	Marcus McElroy	Fr
WR	38	Brenden Fulton	So
RB	40	Justin Falls	Jr
FB	42	Charles Dunkelman	Fr
FB	45	Nate Ryken	Jr
FB	46	Adam Prentice	So
RB	49	Drue Harris	So
OL	51	Colby Meeks	Jr
OL	60	Trae Moxley	Sr
OL	61	Zack Golditch	Sr
OL	62	Alonso Archuleta	Fr
OL	63	Nathon Putallaz	So
OL	64	Scott Brooks	Fr
OL	65	Luis Lebron	Fr
OL	66	Kieran Firment	Fr
OL	68	Jackson McCullough	Fr
OL	69	Barry Wesley	Fr
OL	70	Joctavis Phillips	Fr
OL	71	Jeff Taylor	So
OL	72	Nicho Garcia	Jr
OL	73	Tyler Bjorklünd	Jr
OL	74	Salofi Gaoa	So
OL	76	John Blasco Jr.	Fr
OL	77	Jake Bennett	Sr
OL	78	Ben Knox	Jr
TE	80	John Freismuth	Jr
WR	81	Bisi Johnson	Jr
TE	82	Isiah Pannunzio	Fr
WR	86	Chandler Birrell	So
TE	88	Griffin Hammer	Fr
WR	89	Chandler Draschlin	So

Defense

Pos.	#	Name	Class
DL	4	Christian Colon	Fr
S	7	Jamal Hicks	So
S	8	Jake Schlager	Sr
S	9	Jadon Walker	Fr
CB	10	Kevin Nutt Jr.	Sr
S	11	Jordan Fogal	Sr
LB	12	Deonte Clyburn	Sr
LB	13	Trey Sutton	Fr
CB	14	Anthony Hawkins	So
LB	15	Kiel Robinson	Sr
CB	17	Shun Johnson	Sr
S	18	Braylin Scott	Jr
CB	20	Christian Cumber	Fr
LB	22	Houston Haynes	Sr
CB	25	Darius Campbell	Fr
S	26	Kavapele Maka	Jr
S	29	Justin Sweet	Sr
LB	31	Max McDonald	So
LB	33	Emmanuel Jones	Fr
LB	34	Anthony Giusti	Jr
LB	42	Patrick Elsenbast	Sr
LB	43	Evan Colorito	Sr
CB	45	Dante Carnessale	Fr
S	47	Levi Osborn	Sr
DL	47	Anthony Smith	Fr
S	49	Connor Donohue	Fr
LB	50	Corte Tapia	Fr
LB	51	Patrick Moody	Fr
LB	52	Tre Thomas	Jr
LB	53	Caleb Smith	Jr
DL	54	Arjay Jean	So
LB	55	Josh Watson	Jr
LB	57	Emmanuel Walker	Fr
LB	58	Tanner Clem	Fr
DL	79	Lassine Kone	Fr
DL	90	Jamori Fox	So
DL	91	Jakob Buys	Sr
DL	92	Livingston Paogofie	Fr
LB	93	Conrad Harker	So
DL	94	Darnell Thompson	Sr
DL	95	Richard King	So
DL	97	Toby McBride	So
DL	98	Ellison Hubbard	Fr
DL	99	Colton Foster	Jr

Special teams

Pos.	#	Name	Class
P	35	Josh Kerin	Fr
K	37	Tavis Guerra	Sr
P	41	Ryan Stonehouse	Fr
LS	58	Trent Sieg	Sr
K	67	Joe Deline	Fr
K	83	Braxton Davis	Jr
LS	85	Nathan Lucas	Jr
K	96	Wyatt Bryan	Jr

Head coach

- Mike Bobo

Coordinators/assistant coaches

- Will Friend (Offensive Coordinator / Offensive Line)
- Marty English (Defensive Coordinator / Linebackers)
- Jamie Bryant (Special Teams Coordinator / Safeties)
- Bryan Applewhite (Running Backs)
- Joe Cox (Tight Ends)
- Terry Fair (Cornerbacks)
- Ronnie Letson (Quarterbacks)
- Ricky Logo (Defensive Line)
- Alvis Whitted (Wide Receivers)

Legend

- (C) Team captain
- (S) Suspended
- (I) Ineligible
- Injured
- Redshirt

Roster
Last update: August 26, 2017

== Players in the 2018 NFL draft ==
Player	Position	Round	Pick	NFL club
Michael Gallup	WR	3	81	Dallas Cowboys
