= 2017 Hawaii Rainbow Warriors football team =

American college football season

2017 Hawaii Rainbow Warriors football
- Conference: Mountain West Conference
- West Division
- Record: 3–9 (1–7 MW)
- Head coach: Nick Rolovich (2nd season)
- Offensive coordinator: Brian Smith (2nd season)
- Offensive scheme: Spread
- Defensive coordinator: Legi Suiaunoa (1st season)
- Base defense: 4–3
- MVP: Diocemy Saint Juste
- Home stadium: Aloha Stadium

2017 Mountain West Conference football standings
	Conf.			Overall
Team	W		L	W		L
Mountain Division
No. 22 Boise State xy$	7	–	1	11	–	3
Colorado State	5	–	3	7	–	6
Wyoming	5	–	3	8	–	5
Utah State	4	–	4	6	–	7
Air Force	4	–	4	5	–	7
New Mexico	1	–	7	3	–	9
West Division
Fresno State xy	7	–	1	10	–	4
San Diego State	6	–	2	10	–	3
UNLV	4	–	4	5	–	7
Nevada	3	–	5	3	–	9
Hawaii	1	–	7	3	–	9
San Jose State	1	–	7	2	–	11
Championship: Boise State 17, Fresno State 14
$ – Conference champion; x – Division champion/co-champions; y – Championship game participant; Rankings from AP Poll

The 2017 Hawaii Rainbow Warriors football team represented the University of Hawaii at Manoa in the 2017 NCAA Division I FBS football season. The Rainbow Warriors played their home games at Aloha Stadium in Honolulu. They competed in the West Division of the Mountain West Conference and were led by second-year head coach Nick Rolovich. They finished the season 3–9, 1–7 in Mountain West play to finish in a tie for fifth place in the West Division. This marked the seventh straight losing season, continuing a school record, compiling a record of 29-62 since 2011.

== Schedule ==
Although NCAA rules allow Hawaii to play a 13-game regular season, only 12 games were scheduled for Hawaii's 2017 season.

Date	Time	Opponent	Site	TV	Result	Attendance
August 26	1:00 p.m.	at UMass*	McGuirk Stadium; Amherst, MA	ELVN/SPEC☆	W 38–35	12,145
September 2	7:00 p.m.	Western Carolina*	Aloha Stadium; Honolulu, HI	SPEC PPV	W 41–18	25,472
September 9	12:00 p.m.	at UCLA*	Rose Bowl; Pasadena, CA	P12N	L 23–56	50,444
September 23	4:15 p.m.	at Wyoming	War Memorial Stadium; Laramie, WY (rivalry)	ESPN2	L 21–28 ^{OT}	17,796
September 30	7:00 p.m.	Colorado State	Aloha Stadium; Honolulu, HI	SPEC PPV	L 21–51	25,687
October 7	5:30 p.m.	at Nevada	Mackay Stadium; Reno, NV	CBSSN	L 21–35	16,566
October 14	7:00 p.m.	San Jose State^{†}	Aloha Stadium; Honolulu, HI (rivalry)	SPEC PPV	W 37–26	25,019
October 28	5:15 p.m.	San Diego State	Aloha Stadium; Honolulu, HI	ESPN2	L 7–28	23,018
November 4	1:00 p.m.	at UNLV	Sam Boyd Stadium; Whitney, NV	SPEC PPV	L 23–31	16,278
November 11	7:00 p.m.	Fresno State	Aloha Stadium; Honolulu, HI (rivalry)	SPEC PPV	L 21–31	21,357
November 18	10:00 a.m.	at Utah State	Maverik Stadium; Logan, UT	SPEC PPV	L 0–38	17,650
November 25	4:00 p.m.	BYU*	Aloha Stadium; Honolulu, HI	CBSSN	L 20–30	24,910
*Non-conference game; ^{†}Homecoming; All times are in Hawaii time

☆Spectrum Sports Hawaii simulcast the UMass game. The game was available on Spectrum Sports Hawaii statewide and was not part of the teams PPV package.

== Game summaries ==
=== At UMass ===
	1	2	3	4	Total
Rainbow Warriors	7	7	7	17	38
Minutemen	7	7	14	7	35

=== Western Carolina ===
	1	2	3	4	Total
Catamounts	0	10	8	0	18
Rainbow Warriors	7	14	13	7	41

=== At UCLA ===
	1	2	3	4	Total
Rainbow Warriors	0	7	7	9	23
Bruins	14	21	14	7	56

=== At Wyoming ===
	1	2	3	4	OT	Total
Rainbow Warriors	0	7	7	7	0	21
Cowboys	0	7	7	7	7	28

=== Colorado State ===
	1	2	3	4	Total
Rams	14	17	13	7	51
Rainbow Warriors	0	7	7	7	21

=== At Nevada ===
	1	2	3	4	Total
Rainbow Warriors	7	7	7	0	21
Wolf Pack	7	14	7	7	35

=== San Jose State ===
	1	2	3	4	Total
Spartans	10	3	7	6	26
Rainbow Warriors	0	14	7	16	37

=== San Diego State ===
	1	2	3	4	Total
Aztecs	7	7	7	7	28
Rainbow Warriors	0	7	0	0	7

=== At UNLV ===
	1	2	3	4	Total
Rainbow Warriors	0	6	7	10	23
Rebels	7	0	21	3	31

=== Fresno State ===
	1	2	3	4	Total
Bulldogs	0	21	10	0	31
Rainbow Warriors	7	0	0	14	21

=== At Utah State ===
	1	2	3	4	Total
Rainbow Warriors	0	0	0	0	0
Aggies	14	7	14	3	38

=== BYU ===
	1	2	3	4	Total
Cougars	7	6	7	10	30
Rainbow Warriors	7	0	0	13	20

== Roster ==
2017 Hawaii Rainbow Warriors football team roster
Players
Coaches
Offense

Pos.	#	Name	Class
RB	4	Steven Lakalaka	Sr
RB	6	Paul Harris	Sr
TE	7	Metuisela 'Unga	Jr
WR	9	Devan Stubblefield	So
WR	10	Makoa Camanse-Stevens	Sr
QB	11	Ikaika Woolsey	Sr
WR	12	Keelan Ewaliko	Jr
QB	13	Cole McDonald	Fr
QB	15	Aaron Zwahlen	Fr
QB	16	Beau Reilly	So
QB	17	Cole Brownholtz	So
QB	18	Kyle Gallup	Fr
QB	19	Dru Brown	So
QB	20	Hunter Hughes	Fr
RB	21	Freddie Holly III	Fr
RB	22	Diocemy Saint Juste	Jr
WR	23	Dylan Collie	So
WR	24	Samson Anguay	Sr
RB	29	Genta Ito	Jr
WR	30	Davine Tullis	Fr
WR	31	Frank Abreu	Jr
RB	33	Melvin Davis	Sr
WR	34	Nic Tom	Fr
WR	35	Don'Yeh Patterson	So
WR	36	Ben Scruton	Fr
WR	45	John Ursua	Fr
TE	47	Kaiwi Chung	So
RB	48	Ryan Tuiasoa	Jr
OL	50	Dejon Allen	Jr
OL	51	John Wa'a	Jr
OL	56	Elijah Tupai	Jr
OL	57	J.R. Hensley	Fr
OL	60	Chris Posa	Jr
OL	64	Fred Ulu-Perry	So
OL	65	Asotui Eli	So
OL	66	Eperone Moananu	So
OL	67	Josh Hauani'o	Fr
OL	70	Luke Clements	So
OL	71	Kingjames Taylor	Fr
OL	72	Matt Norman	Jr
OL	73	Austin Webb	Fr
OL	74	RJ Hollis	Sr
OL	76	Arona Amosa	Fr
WR	80	Ammon Barker	Jr
WR	81	Kalakaua Timoteo	Fr
TE	82	Davasyia Hagger	Jr
WR	83	Ko'olua Gaspar	Fr
WR	83	Stan Gaudion	Fr
WR	84	Isaiah Bernard	Sr
TE	85	Andrew James-Ho	Jr
TE	86	Dakota Torres	So
WR	87	Kumoku Hoa	Fr
WR	88	Kalei Letoto	Sr
TE	95	Sione Kauhi	Fr

Defense

Pos.	#	Name	Class
DL	3	David Manoa	Jr
DL	5	Makani Kema-Kaleiwahea	Sr
LB	7	Jeremiah Prichard	Fr
DL	8	Penitito Faalologo	Jr
DB	11	Jamal Mayo	Sr
DB	13	Keala Santiago	Fr
DB	15	Daniel Lewis Jr.	Jr
DB	16	Kalen Hicks	Fr
DB	18	Rojesterman Farris II	Fr
DB	19	Jalen Rogers	Sr
DB	20	Zach Wilson	Fr
DB	21	Damien Packer	Sr
LB	22	Ikem Okeke	Fr
DB	24	Mykal Tolliver	Fr
DB	25	Austin Borengasser	Fr
DB	26	Dejaun Butler	Sr
LB	27	Solomon Matautia	Fr
DB	28	Cameron Hayes	Fr
LB	31	Jahlani Tavai	So
DB	33	Tyrus Tuiasosopo	Fr
DB	34	Austin Pang Kee	Fr
DB	36	Terrance Sayles	So
DB	37	Austin Gerard	Jr
LB	38	Malachi Mageo	So
DB	39	Trayvon Henderson	Jr
LB	40	Dany Mulanga	So
LB	41	Noah Borden	So
DB	42	Scheyenne Sanitoa	Fr
DL	43	Tevarua Aldridge	So
LB	44	Russell Williams Jr.	Jr
DL	49	Manly Williams	Fr
LB	52	Dalton Gouveia	Fr
LB	53	Dayton Furuta	Fr
LB	54	La'akea Look	Fr
LB	58	Rashaan Falemalu	So
LB	59	Max Broman	Jr
DL	61	Wesley Faagau	Fr
DL	63	Taaga Tuulima	Fr
DL	70	Joey Nu'uanu-Kuhi'iki	Fr
DL	75	Kory Rasmussen	Sr
DL	77	Alesana Sunia	Fr
LB	88	Tumua Tuinei	So
DL	89	Cole Carter	Fr
DL	91	Samiuela Akoteu	Fr
DL	92	Maxwell Hendrie	Fr
DL	93	Isaac Liva	Fr
DL	94	Ka'aumoana Gifford	So
DL	95	Jeremy McClam	Jr
DL	96	Kaimana Padello	Fr
DL	97	Meffy Koloamatangi	Jr
DL	98	Viane Moala	Fr
DL	99	Zeno Choi	So

Special teams

Pos.	#	Name	Class
P	46	Alex Trifonovitch	Fr
LS	62	Brodie Nakama	Sr
K	69	Stephen Yaffe	Fr

Head coach

- Nick Rolovich

Coordinators/assistant coaches

- Brian Smith – Associate head coach/offensive coordinator/running backs/tight ends
- Legi Suiaunoa –Defensive coordinator/defensive tackles
- Mayur Chaudhari – Special Teams coordinator/defensive Ends
- Craig Stutzmann – Passing Game coordinator/quarterbacks
- Kefense Hynson – Wide receivers
- Chris Naeole – Offensive line
- Sean Duggan – Linebackers
- Jacob Yoro – Safeties
- Abe Elimimian – Cornerbacks

Support Staff

- Bubba Reynolds – Strength & conditioning coordinator
- Jimmy Morimoto – Director of football operations
- Jason Cvercko – Director of recruiting & retention
- Oli Vea – Video Coordinator

Legend

- (C) Team captain
- (S) Suspended
- (I) Ineligible
- Injured
- Redshirt
