= 2017 Utah State Aggies football team =

American college football season

2017 Utah State Aggies football

Arizona Bowl, L 20–26 vs. New Mexico State
- Conference: Mountain West Conference
- Mountain Division
- Record: 6–7 (4–4 MW)
- Head coach: Matt Wells (5th season)
- Offensive coordinator: David Yost (1st season)
- Offensive scheme: Hurry-up spread
- Co-defensive coordinators: Frank Maile (2nd season); Kendrick Shaver (4th season)
- Base defense: 3–3–5
- Home stadium: Maverik Stadium

2017 Mountain West Conference football standings
	Conf.			Overall
Team	W		L	W		L
Mountain Division
No. 22 Boise State xy$	7	–	1	11	–	3
Colorado State	5	–	3	7	–	6
Wyoming	5	–	3	8	–	5
Utah State	4	–	4	6	–	7
Air Force	4	–	4	5	–	7
New Mexico	1	–	7	3	–	9
West Division
Fresno State xy	7	–	1	10	–	4
San Diego State	6	–	2	10	–	3
UNLV	4	–	4	5	–	7
Nevada	3	–	5	3	–	9
Hawaii	1	–	7	3	–	9
San Jose State	1	–	7	2	–	11
Championship: Boise State 17, Fresno State 14
$ – Conference champion; x – Division champion/co-champions; y – Championship game participant; Rankings from AP Poll

The 2017 Utah State Aggies football team represented Utah State University in the 2017 NCAA Division I FBS football season. The Aggies were led by fifth-year head coach Matt Wells and played their home games at Merlin Olsen Field at Maverik Stadium. They competed as members of the Mountain Division of the Mountain West Conference. They finished the season 6–7, 4–4 in Mountain West play to finish in a tie for fourth place in the Mountain Division. They were invited to the Arizona Bowl where they lost to New Mexico State.

== Coaching staff ==
=== Coaching changes ===
Utah State hired David Yost as offensive coordinator on December 30, 2016. Yost had previously been the quarterbacks coach at Oregon. Both of the co-offensive coordinators from 2016 remain on staff; Jovon Bouknight as Outside Receivers Coach, and Luke Wells as the Tight Ends/inside receivers coach.

=== Coaches ===
Name	Title
Matt Wells	Head coach
Frank Maile	Assistant head coach/co-defensive coordinator/defensive line coach
Kendrick Shaver	Co-defensive coordinator/outside linebackers Coach
David Yost	Offensive coordinator/quarterbacks coach
Mark Tommerdahl	Special teams coordinator/running backs coach
Jovon Bouknight	Outside receivers coach
Julius Brown	Defensive backs coach
Stacy Collins	Inside linebackers coach
Steve Farmer	Offensive line coach
Luke Wells	Tight Ends/Inside Receivers coach
Brad Kragthorpe	Graduate assistant

== Schedule ==
Utah State's 2017 football schedule was announced on March 2, 2017. The Aggies will play three straight home games for the first time since 1997, in a stretch that includes in-state rival BYU, Colorado State, and rival Wyoming.

Date	Time	Opponent	Site	TV	Result	Attendance
September 1	7:00 p.m.	at No. 9 Wisconsin*	Camp Randall Stadium; Madison, WI	ESPN	L 10–59	75,324
September 7	6:00 p.m.	Idaho State*	Maverik Stadium; Logan, UT	Stadium	W 51–13	19,638
September 16	1:00 p.m.	at Wake Forest*	BB&T Field; Winston-Salem, NC	ACCN Extra	L 10–46	27,971
September 23	5:30 p.m.	at San Jose State	CEFCU Stadium; San Jose, CA	Stadium	W 61–10	12,426
September 29	6:00 p.m.	BYU*	Maverik Stadium; Logan, UT (Beehive Boot; The Old Wagon Wheel)	CBSSN	W 40–24	24,112
October 7	2:30 p.m.	Colorado State	Maverik Stadium; Logan, UT	ATTSNRM	L 14–27	18,004
October 14	2:30 p.m.	Wyoming^{†}	Maverik Stadium; Logan, UT (Bridger's Battle)	Stadium	L 23–28	22,234
October 21	4:00 p.m.	at UNLV	Sam Boyd Stadium; Whitney, NV	ATTSNRM	W 52–28	18,157
October 28	8:00 p.m.	Boise State	Maverik Stadium; Logan, UT	CBSSN	L 14–41	19,012
November 4	3:30 p.m.	at New Mexico	Dreamstyle Stadium; Albuquerque, NM	ATTSNRM	W 24–10	19,293
November 18	12:00 p.m.	Hawaii	Maverik Stadium; Logan, UT	Stadium	W 38–0	17,650
November 25	8:15 p.m.	at Air Force	Falcon Stadium; Colorado Springs, CO	ESPN2	L 35–38	17,252
December 29	3:30 p.m.	vs. New Mexico State*	Arizona Stadium; Tucson, AZ (Arizona Bowl)	CBSSN	L 20–26 ^{OT}	39,132
*Non-conference game; ^{†}Homecoming; Rankings from AP Poll released prior to the game; All times are in Mountain time

== Game summaries ==
=== At Wisconsin ===
	1	2	3	4	Total
Aggies	10	0	0	0	10
Badgers	0	10	28	21	59

=== Idaho State ===
	1	2	3	4	Total
Bengals	0	6	7	0	13
Aggies	17	21	7	6	51

=== At Wake Forest ===
	1	2	3	4	Total
Aggies	0	0	10	0	10
Demon Deacons	14	15	17	0	46

=== At San Jose State ===
	1	2	3	4	Total
Aggies	14	24	17	6	61
Spartans	0	0	7	3	10

=== BYU ===
	1	2	3	4	Total
Cougars	7	14	0	3	24
Aggies	7	17	3	13	40

=== Colorado State ===
	1	2	3	4	Total
Rams	17	7	0	3	27
Aggies	0	7	0	7	14

=== Wyoming ===
	1	2	3	4	Total
Cowboys	3	6	7	12	28
Aggies	6	10	0	7	23

=== At UNLV ===
	1	2	3	4	Total
Aggies	7	21	7	17	52
Rebels	14	14	0	0	28

=== Boise State ===
	1	2	3	4	Total
Broncos	14	14	7	6	41
Aggies	7	0	7	0	14

=== At New Mexico ===
	1	2	3	4	Total
Aggies	7	7	3	7	24
Lobos	0	3	0	7	10

=== Hawaii ===
	1	2	3	4	Total
Rainbow Warriors	0	0	0	0	0
Aggies	14	7	14	3	38

=== At Air Force ===
	1	2	3	4	Total
Aggies	14	7	0	14	35
Falcons	10	7	7	14	38

=== vs New Mexico State–Arizona Bowl ===
	1	2	3	4	OT	Total
NMSU Aggies	10	3	0	7	6	26
USU Aggies	7	6	0	7	0	20
