= 2017 New Mexico Lobos football team =

American college football season

2017 New Mexico Lobos football
- Conference: Mountain West Conference
- Mountain Division
- Record: 3–9 (1–7 MW)
- Head coach: Bob Davie (6th season)
- Offensive coordinator: Bob DeBesse (6th season)
- Offensive scheme: Multiple pistol
- Defensive coordinator: Kevin Cosgrove (4th season)
- Base defense: 3–4
- Home stadium: Dreamstyle Stadium

2017 Mountain West Conference football standings
	Conf.			Overall
Team	W		L	W		L
Mountain Division
No. 22 Boise State xy$	7	–	1	11	–	3
Colorado State	5	–	3	7	–	6
Wyoming	5	–	3	8	–	5
Utah State	4	–	4	6	–	7
Air Force	4	–	4	5	–	7
New Mexico	1	–	7	3	–	9
West Division
Fresno State xy	7	–	1	10	–	4
San Diego State	6	–	2	10	–	3
UNLV	4	–	4	5	–	7
Nevada	3	–	5	3	–	9
Hawaii	1	–	7	3	–	9
San Jose State	1	–	7	2	–	11
Championship: Boise State 17, Fresno State 14
$ – Conference champion; x – Division champion/co-champions; y – Championship game participant; Rankings from AP Poll

The 2017 New Mexico Lobos football team represented the University of New Mexico as a member of the Mountain Division in the Mountain West Conference (MW) during the 2017 NCAA Division I FBS football season. Led by sixth-year head coach Bob Davie, the Lobos compiled an overall record of 3–9 with a mark of 1–7 in conference play, placing last out of six teams in the MW's Mountain Division. The team played home games at Dreamstyle Stadium in Albuquerque, New Mexico.

== Schedule ==
Date	Time	Opponent	Site	TV	Result	Attendance
September 2	6:00 p.m.	Abilene Christian*	Dreamstyle Stadium; Albuquerque, NM		W 38–14	21,475
September 9	6:00 p.m.	New Mexico State*	Dreamstyle Stadium; Albuquerque, NM (Rio Grande Rivalry)	Stadium	L 28–30	32,427
September 14	6:00 p.m.	at Boise State	Albertsons Stadium; Boise, ID	ESPN	L 14–28	28,385
September 23	11:30 a.m.	at Tulsa*	H.A. Chapman Stadium; Tulsa, OK	ESPN3	W 16–13	18,026
September 30	5:00 p.m.	Air Force^{†}	Dreamstyle Stadium; Albuquerque, NM	CBSSN	W 56–38	21,864
October 14	8:00 p.m.	at Fresno State	Bulldog Stadium; Fresno, CA	ATTSNRM	L 0–38	28,090
October 20	8:15 p.m.	Colorado State	Dreamstyle Stadium; Albuquerque, NM	ESPN2	L 24–27	17,358
October 28	5:30 p.m.	at Wyoming	War Memorial Stadium; Laramie, WY	ESPNU	L 3–42	18,249
November 4	3:30 p.m.	Utah State	Dreamstyle Stadium; Albuquerque, NM	ATTSNRM	L 10–24	19,293
November 11	5:00 p.m.	at Texas A&M*	Kyle Field; College Station, TX	ESPNU	L 14–55	99,051
November 17	7:30 p.m.	UNLV	Dreamstyle Stadium; Albuquerque, NM	ESPN2	L 35–38	14,744
November 24	1:30 p.m.	at San Diego State	SDCCU Stadium; San Diego, CA	CBSSN	L 10–35	28,978
*Non-conference game; ^{†}Homecoming; All times are in Mountain time

== Game summaries ==
=== Abilene Christian ===
	1	2	3	4	Total
Wildcats	7	0	0	7	14
Lobos	7	7	10	14	38

=== New Mexico State ===
	1	2	3	4	Total
Aggies	13	10	7	0	30
Lobos	2	3	0	23	28

=== At Boise State ===
	1	2	3	4	Total
Lobos	0	7	0	7	14
Broncos	7	7	0	14	28

=== At Tulsa ===
	1	2	3	4	Total
Lobos	7	6	0	3	16
Golden Hurricane	3	7	0	3	13

=== Air Force ===
	1	2	3	4	Total
Falcons	0	21	3	14	38
Lobos	7	7	21	21	56

=== At Fresno State ===
	1	2	3	4	Total
Lobos	0	0	0	0	0
Bulldogs	14	7	10	7	38

=== Colorado State ===
	1	2	3	4	Total
Rams	0	21	0	6	27
Lobos	7	3	7	7	24

=== At Wyoming ===
	1	2	3	4	Total
Lobos	0	0	0	3	3
Cowboys	7	35	0	0	42

=== Utah State ===
	1	2	3	4	Total
Aggies	7	7	3	7	24
Lobos	0	3	0	7	10

=== At Texas A&M ===
	1	2	3	4	Total
Lobos	0	7	7	0	14
Aggies	13	35	0	7	55

=== UNLV ===
	1	2	3	4	Total
Rebels	10	14	3	11	38
Lobos	0	14	7	14	35

=== At San Diego State ===
	1	2	3	4	Total
Lobos	0	0	10	0	10
Aztecs	7	7	7	14	35

== Personnel ==
2017 New Mexico Lobos football team roster
Players
Coaches
Offense

Pos.	#	Name	Class
WR	2	Delane Hart-Johnson	RJr
RB	3	Richard McQuarley	Sr
RB	4	Romell Jordan	RSr
WR	5	Patrick Reed	RJr
WR	7	Anselem Umeh	RFr
WR	8	Q' Drennan	RSo
QB	9	Bryson Carroll	Fr
RB	10	Zahneer Shuler	Jr
QB	11	Coltin Gerhart	RJr
QB	12	Derek Martinez	RJr
QB	13	Lamar Jordan	RSr
WR	14	Rafael Hidalgo	RSo
WR	15	Emmanuel Harris	Sr
QB	16	Tevaka Tuioti	RFr
QB	17	Caleb Hennie	Fr
WR	18	Chris Davis Jr.	Sr
RB	19	Bobby Cole	Fr
RB	20	Daryl Chestnut	Sr
RB	21	Daevon Vigilant	RFr
WR	23	Jay Griffin IV	RFr
RB	24	Kentrail Moran	RFr
RB	25	Tyrone Owens	RJr
RB	26	Jacob Smith	RFr
WR	27	Cade Hackey	Fr
WR	28	Cameron Thomas	RFr
RB	29	Joshua Woisin	Fr
WR	31	Thomas Vieira	RSo
RB	32	Micah Gray	Fr
RB	33	Javohn Jones	RSo
OL	51	Jacob Barnhill	Fr
OL	54	Radson Jang	Fr
OL	55	Aaron Jenkins	RJr
OL	56	Jacob Mairson	Fr
OL	59	Blaise Fountain	Sr
OL	66	Dylan Weaver	Fr
OL	67	Hayden Wilson	Fr
OL	69	Beau Hott	RSo
OL	72	Avery Jordan	Sr
OL	74	Ray Baylor III	Sr
OL	77	Charlie Grammel	RSo
OL	78	Izrael Castellanos	RSo
OL	79	Chris Estrella	So
WR	81	Aaron Molina	Jr
TE	84	Erik Beilman	RSo
TE	85	Aaron Overacker	RSo
TE	86	Daniel Peabody	Fr
WR	87	Anu Somoye	RSo
TE	88	Marcus Williams	Fr
TE	89	Dyson Chmura	RSo

Defense

Pos.	#	Name	Class
LB	2	Kimmie Carson	RSr
CB	3	D'Angelo Ross	Jr
S	4	Bijon Parker	RJr
S	5	Michael Sewell Jr.	Jr
LB	6	Austin Ocasio	RSr
CB	7	Blair Manly	RSo
DB	8	Willie Hobdy	So
DB	9	Stanley Barnwell Jr.	Jr
S	12	Steven Steele	Sr
CB	13	Jalin Burrell	Jr
DB	14	Gabe Ortega	RFr
S	15	Kameron Miller	RFr
S	16	Jacob Girgle	RSr
S	17	Nico Bolden	Fr
DB	19	Elijah Lilly	So
LB	20	Rayshawn Boyce	Jr
CB	21	Corey Hightower	RFr
S	23	Marcus Hayes	Fr
LB	26	Sitiveni Tamaivena	Jr
S	28	Jake Rothschiller	RSr
LB	29	Jordan Flack	Jr
S	32	Kyle Rothschiller	Sr
LB	33	Alex Hart	Jr
S	35	Kenneth Maxwell	RSr
CB	36	Dorsett Valdez	RSo
LB	37	DaQuan Baker	RJr
LB	38	Matt French	RFr
S	39	Johnny Hernandez	Jr
LB	41	James Portilla	RJr
LB	45	Evahelotu Tohi	RJr
LB	46	Brandon Shook	So
DL	50	Teton Saltes	RFr
DL	52	Aaron Blackwell	So
DL	53	Cody Baker	Jr
DL	54	Langston Murray	Fr
DL	55	Emmanuel Joseph	RFr
LB	57	Everett Powell	RJr
DL	92	Jermane Conyers	Jr
DL	93	Nahje Flowers	RFr
LB	94	David Brown	RFr
DL	95	Garrett Hughes	Sr
DL	96	Johnny Williams	RSr
DL	98	Kene Okonkwo	Sr
LB	99	Rhashaun Epting	RFr

Special teams

Pos.	#	Name	Class
P	30	Corey Bojorquez	Sr
LS	34	Jared EnRico	RFr
P	91	John Mitchell	Fr
K	94	Andrew Shelley	Fr
K	95	Jason Sanders	Sr
LS	97	Lon Hampton	Jr

Head coach

- Bob Davie

Coordinators/assistant coaches

- Bob DeBesse – Offensive Coordinator/WRs
- Kevin Cosgrove – Defensive Coordinator/Linebackers
- Apollo Wright – Special Teams Coordinator / QBs
- Saga Tuitele – Run Game Coordinator/OL
- Scott Baumgartner – Running Backs
- Clay Davie – Tight Ends
- Stan Eggen – Defensive Line
- Jordan Peterson – Safeties
- Al Simmons – Cornerbacks
- Brian DeSpain – Assistant A.D. for Football Operations
- Aurmon Satchell – Director of Athletic Performance
- Andy Grubb – Assistant Director of Athletic Performance
- John McWilliams – Athletic Performance Graduate Assistant
- Vince Natali – Director of Recruiting
- Jacob Bronowski – Offensive Graduate Assistant
- Ben Sherman – Offensive Graduate Assistant
- Michael Smith – Defensive Graduate Assistant
- Greg Svarczkopf – Defensive Graduate Assistant
- Chris Schieder – Equipment Operations Specialist (FB)
- Chris Crooks – Video Coordinator
- Paul Kasero – Videographer
- Cameron Kohl – Videographer

Legend

- (C) Team captain
- (S) Suspended
- (I) Ineligible
- Injured
- Redshirt

Roster

== Players in the 2018 NFL draft ==
Player	Position	Round	Pick	NFL club
Jason Sanders	K	7	229	Miami Dolphins
