= 2017 Air Force Falcons football team =

American college football season

2017 Air Force Falcons football
- Conference: Mountain West Conference
- Mountain Division
- Record: 5–7 (4–4 MW)
- Head coach: Troy Calhoun (11th season)
- Offensive coordinator: Mike Thiessen (9th season)
- Offensive scheme: Triple option
- Defensive coordinator: Steve Russ (6th season)
- Base defense: 3–4
- Captains: Alex Norton; Grant Ross; Luke Strebel; Santo Coppola
- Home stadium: Falcon Stadium

Uniform
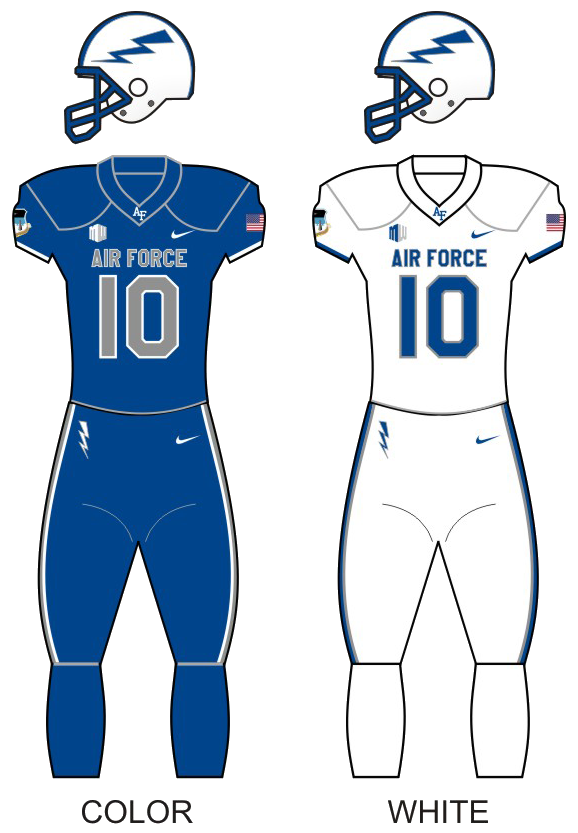

2017 Mountain West Conference football standings
| | Conf. | | | Overall |
| Team | W | | L | W | | L |
|---|---|---|---|---|---|---|
Mountain Division
| No. 22 Boise State xy$ | 7 | – | 1 | 11 | – | 3 |
| Colorado State | 5 | – | 3 | 7 | – | 6 |
| Wyoming | 5 | – | 3 | 8 | – | 5 |
| Utah State | 4 | – | 4 | 6 | – | 7 |
| Air Force | 4 | – | 4 | 5 | – | 7 |
| New Mexico | 1 | – | 7 | 3 | – | 9 |
West Division
| Fresno State xy | 7 | – | 1 | 10 | – | 4 |
| San Diego State | 6 | – | 2 | 10 | – | 3 |
| UNLV | 4 | – | 4 | 5 | – | 7 |
| Nevada | 3 | – | 5 | 3 | – | 9 |
| Hawaii | 1 | – | 7 | 3 | – | 9 |
| San Jose State | 1 | – | 7 | 2 | – | 11 |
Championship: Boise State 17, Fresno State 14
$ – Conference champion; x – Division champion/co-champions; y – Championship game participant; Rankings from AP Poll

The 2017 Air Force Falcons football team represented the United States Air Force Academy as a member of the Mountain Division in the Mountain West Conference (MW) during the 2017 NCAA Division I FBS football season. Led by 11th-year head coach Troy Calhoun, the Falcons compiled an overall record of 5–7 with a mark of 4–4 in conference play, tying for fourth place in the MW's Mountain Division. The team played home games at Falcon Stadium in Colorado Springs, Colorado

== Schedule ==
| Date | Time | Opponent | Site | TV | Result | Attendance |
|---|---|---|---|---|---|---|
| September 2 | 12:00 p.m. | VMI* | Falcon Stadium; Colorado Springs, CO | ESPN3 | W 62–0 | 37,286 |
| September 16 | 10:00 a.m. | at No. 7 Michigan* | Michigan Stadium; Ann Arbor, MI | BTN | L 13–29 | 111,387 |
| September 23 | 5:00 p.m. | No. 22 San Diego State | Falcon Stadium; Colorado Springs, CO | CBSSN | L 24–28 | 27,575 |
| September 30 | 5:00 p.m. | at New Mexico | Dreamstyle Stadium; Albuquerque, NM | CBSSN | L 38–56 | 21,864 |
| October 7 | 1:30 p.m. | at Navy* | Navy–Marine Corps Memorial Stadium; Annapolis, MD (Commander-in-Chief's Trophy) | CBSSN | L 45–48 | 38,792 |
| October 14 | 12:00 p.m. | UNLV | Falcon Stadium; Colorado Springs, CO | ATTSNRM | W 34–30 | 26,679 |
| October 20 | 7:30 p.m. | at Nevada | Mackay Stadium; Reno, NV | CBSSN | W 45–42 | 16,789 |
| October 28 | 1:00 p.m. | at Colorado State | Colorado State Stadium; Fort Collins, CO (rivalry) | CBSSN | W 45–28 | 33,074 |
| November 4 | 1:30 p.m. | Army* | Falcon Stadium; Colorado Springs, CO (Commander-in-Chief's Trophy) | CBSSN | L 0–21 | 41,875 |
| November 11 | 8:15 p.m. | Wyoming | Falcon Stadium; Colorado Springs, CO | ESPNU | L 14–28 | 24,257 |
| November 18 | 8:15 p.m. | at Boise State | Albertsons Stadium; Boise, ID | ESPN2 | L 19–44 | 33,030 |
| November 25 | 8:15 p.m. | Utah State | Falcon Stadium; Colorado Springs, CO | ESPN2 | W 38–35 | 17,252 |
*Non-conference game; Rankings from AP Poll released prior to the game; All times are in Mountain time

== Game summaries ==
=== VMI ===
| | 1 | 2 | 3 | 4 | Total |
|---|---|---|---|---|---|
| Keydets | 0 | 0 | 0 | 0 | 0 |
| Falcons | 14 | 21 | 14 | 13 | 62 |

=== At Michigan ===
| | 1 | 2 | 3 | 4 | Total |
|---|---|---|---|---|---|
| Falcons | 3 | 3 | 7 | 0 | 13 |
| No. 7 Wolverines | 3 | 6 | 10 | 10 | 29 |

=== San Diego State ===
| | 1 | 2 | 3 | 4 | Total |
|---|---|---|---|---|---|
| No. 22 Aztecs | 0 | 7 | 7 | 14 | 28 |
| Falcons | 6 | 3 | 0 | 15 | 24 |

=== At New Mexico ===
| | 1 | 2 | 3 | 4 | Total |
|---|---|---|---|---|---|
| Falcons | 0 | 21 | 3 | 14 | 38 |
| Lobos | 7 | 7 | 21 | 21 | 56 |

=== At Navy ===
| | 1 | 2 | 3 | 4 | Total |
|---|---|---|---|---|---|
| Falcons | 7 | 3 | 14 | 21 | 45 |
| Midshipmen | 7 | 21 | 10 | 10 | 48 |

=== UNLV ===
| | 1 | 2 | 3 | 4 | Total |
|---|---|---|---|---|---|
| Rebels | 17 | 10 | 3 | 0 | 30 |
| Falcons | 0 | 7 | 13 | 14 | 34 |

=== At Nevada ===
| | 1 | 2 | 3 | 4 | Total |
|---|---|---|---|---|---|
| Falcons | 7 | 21 | 7 | 10 | 45 |
| Wolf Pack | 14 | 6 | 8 | 14 | 42 |

=== At Colorado State ===
| | 1 | 2 | 3 | 4 | Total |
|---|---|---|---|---|---|
| Falcons | 7 | 21 | 3 | 14 | 45 |
| Rams | 14 | 7 | 7 | 0 | 28 |

=== Army ===
| | 1 | 2 | 3 | 4 | Total |
|---|---|---|---|---|---|
| Black Knights | 7 | 7 | 0 | 7 | 21 |
| Falcons | 0 | 0 | 0 | 0 | 0 |

=== Wyoming ===
| | 1 | 2 | 3 | 4 | Total |
|---|---|---|---|---|---|
| Cowboys | 7 | 14 | 0 | 7 | 28 |
| Falcons | 0 | 7 | 7 | 0 | 14 |

=== At Boise State ===
| | 1 | 2 | 3 | 4 | Total |
|---|---|---|---|---|---|
| Falcons | 7 | 3 | 0 | 9 | 19 |
| Broncos | 17 | 10 | 10 | 7 | 44 |

=== Utah State ===
| | 1 | 2 | 3 | 4 | Total |
|---|---|---|---|---|---|
| Aggies | 14 | 7 | 0 | 14 | 35 |
| Falcons | 10 | 7 | 7 | 14 | 38 |
