= Leighton Vander Esch =

American football player (born 1996)

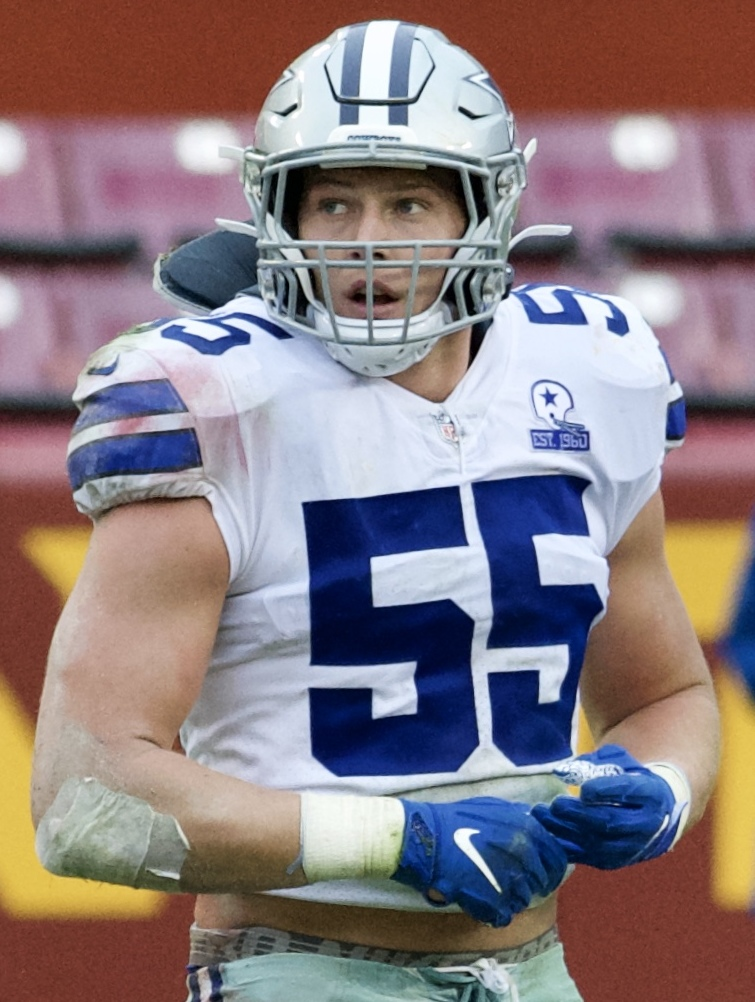
- Vander Esch with the Dallas Cowboys in 2020

No. 55
- Position: Linebacker

Personal information
- Born: February 8, 1996 (age 30); Riggins, Idaho, U.S.
- Listed height: 6 ft 4 in (1.93 m)
- Listed weight: 255 lb (116 kg)

Career information
- High school: Salmon River (Riggins)
- College: Boise State (2014–2017)
- NFL draft: 2018: 1st round, 19th overall pick

Career history
- Dallas Cowboys (2018–2023)

Awards and highlights
- Second-team All-Pro (2018); Pro Bowl (2018); PFWA All-Rookie Team (2018); MW Defensive Player of the Year (2017); First-team All-MW (2017)

Career NFL statistics
- Total tackles: 469
- Sacks: 3.5
- Forced fumbles: 3
- Fumble recoveries: 2
- Pass deflections: 13
- Interceptions: 3
- Defensive touchdowns: 1
- Stats at Pro Football Reference

Leighton Vander Esch (born February 8, 1996) is an American former professional football player who was a linebacker for the Dallas Cowboys of the National Football League (NFL). He played college football for the Boise State Broncos, and was selected by the Cowboys in the first round of the 2018 NFL draft. He spent six seasons with the team, earning Pro Bowl and All-Pro honors in his rookie season before neck injuries prematurely ended his playing career.

== Early life ==
Vander Esch was born and raised in Riggins, Idaho. He is of Dutch descent. He attended Salmon River High School in Riggins, and competed in eight-man football, basketball, and track. His graduating class of 2014 had eleven students.

In football, Vander Esch played quarterback and middle linebacker. As a senior, he completed 121 of 199 attempts (60.8 percent) for 2,155 yards and 28 passing touchdowns with one interception. He also had 157 carries for 1,565 yards and 34 rushing touchdowns, 131 tackles (85 solo), five interceptions, five fumble recoveries, and four defensive touchdowns. In the state's final 53-38 win against Lighthouse Christian School, he collected more than 500 yards of total offense and scored all five of his team's offensive touchdown]. He led SRHS to a 1A, Div. II state championship and was named All-Idaho 1A Division II Player of the Year.

In basketball, he averaged 29.4 points and 11.1 rebounds per game as a senior and led Salmon River to consecutive 1A, Div. II state championships.

== College career ==
Vander Esch walked on at Boise State University, 150 miles (240 km) south of Riggins. As a redshirt freshman assigned to the role of backup linebacker in 2015, he appeared in all twelve games and registered 20 tackles (14 solo), one sack, one fumble recovery, and a first down on a fake punt.

As a sophomore in 2016, he was limited to six games due to a neck injury, returning in the twelfth game where the Broncos faced the Air Force Falcons; Vander Esch tallied 27 tackles (23 solo), 3.5 tackles-for-loss, one sack, and one interception.

As a junior in 2017, Vander Esch became a starter at weak-side linebacker and had a breakout season. He was named the Mountain West Defensive Player of the Year after making 141 tackles (fifth in the FBS), four sacks, two interceptions, and four forced fumbles (led the team).

After the season, Vander Esch opted not to play as a fifth-year senior for the Broncos in 2018 and entered the 2018 NFL draft. He finished his collegiate career with 188 tackles, five sacks and three interceptions.

== Professional career ==
=== Pre-draft ===
On December 21, 2017, Vander Esch announced his decision to forgo his remaining eligibility and enter the 2018 NFL draft. He attended the NFL Scouting Combine in Indianapolis in late February and completed all of the combine and positional drills. Vander Esch's overall combine performance impressed scouts; he finished tied for second among all linebackers in the vertical jump and short shuttle. He also tied for fifth among his position group in the broad jump, as well as fifth among linebackers in the three-cone drill.

External videos
- Vander Esch's NFL Combine Workout
- Leighton Vander Esch runs the 40-yard dash

Vander Esch participated in Boise State's pro day on April 3, 2018, but opted to stand on his combine numbers and only performed positional drills. He attended pre-draft visits with multiple teams, including the New England Patriots, Pittsburgh Steelers, Philadelphia Eagles, Detroit Lions, Dallas Cowboys, and Buffalo Bills. At the conclusion of the pre-draft process, Vander Esch was projected to be a first-round pick by NFL draft experts and scouts. He was ranked as the third-best linebacker prospect in the draft by Sports Illustrated, the third-best outside linebacker by DraftScout.com, the fourth-best linebacker by NFL analyst Mike Mayock, and the sixth-best outside linebacker in the draft by ESPN analyst Mel Kiper Jr.

Pre-draft measurables
Height	Weight	Arm length	Hand span	Wingspan	40-yard dash	10-yard split	20-yard split	20-yard shuttle	Three-cone drill	Vertical jump	Broad jump	Bench press
6 ft 4 1/4 in (1.94 m)	256 lb (116 kg)	33 7/8 in (0.86 m)	9 3/4 in (0.25 m)	6 ft 9 1/8 in (2.06 m)	4.65 s	1.56 s	2.69 s	4.15 s	6.88 s	39.5 in (1.00 m)	10 ft 4 in (3.15 m)	20 reps
All values from NFL Combine

=== 2018 ===
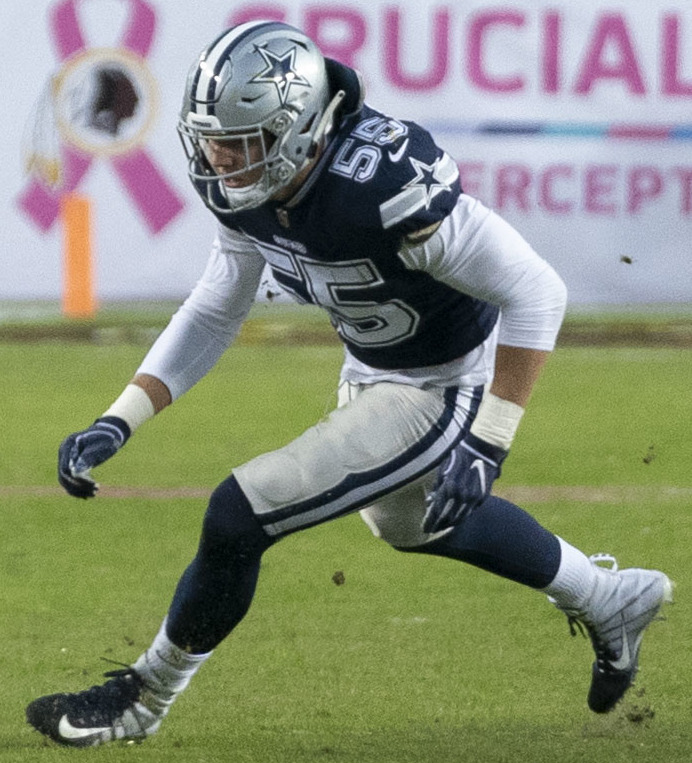
Vander Esch with the Cowboys in 2018

The Cowboys selected Vander Esch in the first round (19th overall) of the 2018 NFL draft. He was the third linebacker selected.

External videos
- Cowboys draft Vander Esch 19th overall
- Vander Esch celebrates NFL draft with family

On May 11, the Cowboys signed Vander Esch to a fully guaranteed four-year $11.84 million contract that includes a signing bonus of $6.69 million.

Throughout training camp, Vander Esch competed to be the starting middle linebacker against Jaylon Smith. Head coach Jason Garrett named Vander Esch the backup middle linebacker, behind Smith, to start the regular season.

He made his professional regular season debut in the Cowboys' season-opener at the Carolina Panthers and recorded three combined tackles in their 16–8 loss. On September 30, Vander Esch earned his first career start after Sean Lee sustained a hamstring injury and was inactive for three games (Weeks 4–6). He made six combined tackles as the Cowboys defeated the Lions 26–24. The following week, he collected 14 combined tackles (11 solo) during their 19–16 loss at the Houston Texans in Week 5. On November 11, Vander Esch recorded a season-high 13 solo tackles and made his first career interception during a 27–20 win over the Eagles, earning him NFC Defensive Player of the Week. He intercepted a pass by Eagles' quarterback Carson Wentz, that was intended for tight end Zach Ertz, during the first quarter. The following week, Vander Esch recorded eight combined tackles, a season-high three pass deflections, and intercepted a pass by Atlanta Falcons' quarterback Matt Ryan during a 22–19 win at the Falcons in Week 11. In Week 16, he collected a season-high 15 combined tackles (11 solo) as the Cowboys defeated the Tampa Bay Buccaneers 27–20.

He finished his first season in 2018 with a franchise rookie-record 140 combined tackles (102 solo), seven deflections, and two interceptions in 16 games and 11 starts. Vander Esch finished with the third most tackles among all players in 2018, behind Indianapolis Colts linebacker Shaquille Leonard (163 tackles) and Green Bay Packers linebacker Blake Martinez (144 tackles). He was named to the PFWA All-Rookie Team.

The Cowboys finished first in the NFC East with a 10–6 record and earned a playoff berth. On January 5, 2019, Vander Esch started in his first career playoff game and recorded ten combined tackles (six solo) as the Cowboys defeated the Seattle Seahawks 24–22 in the NFC Wildcard Game.

=== 2019 ===
In week 4 against the New Orleans Saints, Vander Esch recorded a team-high 11 tackles in the 12–10 loss. He missed weeks 12–16 with a nerve issue in his neck before deciding to undergo surgery to correct the issue. He was placed on injured reserve on December 24, 2019. Across nine games, Vander Esch recorded 72 tackles (43 solo, 29 assisted), 0.5 sacks, three passes defended, and one forced fumble.

=== 2020 ===
In the week 1 season opener against the Los Angeles Rams, Vander Esch recorded two combined tackles in the first half before leaving the game with a broken collarbone. The next day it was announced that he would undergo another surgery and was placed on injured reserve on September 15. He was designated to return from injured reserve on October 7 and began practicing with the team again. He was activated on October 19, 2020. Across 10 games, Vander Esch recorded 60 tackles (32 solo, 28 assisted), one sack, one forced fumble, and one fumble recovery.

=== 2021 ===
On May 3, 2021, the Cowboys declined the fifth-year option of Vander Esch's contract, which would make him a free agent in the 2022 offseason. Across 17 games, Vander Esch recorded 77 tackles (48 solo, 29 assisted), one sack, two passes defended, and one interception.

=== 2022 ===
On March 18, 2022, Vander Esch re-signed with the Cowboys on a one-year contract. In 14 games, Vander Esch recorded 90 tackles (54 solo, 36 assisted), one sack, one pass deflection, and one forced fumble. Vander Esch missed the final four regular season games with a neck stinger he suffered in Week 14 against the Houston Texans.

Vander Esch returned in time for the playoffs, recording nine tackles in the Cowboys' 31–14 wild card round victory against the Buccaneers and 11 in their 19–12 divisional round loss to the San Francisco 49ers.

=== 2023 ===
On March 14, 2023, Vander Esch re-signed with the Dallas Cowboys on a two-year deal. Vander Esch scored his only NFL career touchdown on an 11-yard fumble return in Week 4 against the New England Patriots. On October 8, Vander Esch suffered a neck injury in the 42–10 loss against the San Francisco 49ers. He was placed on injured reserve on October 16. On November 14, Cowboys owner Jerry Jones confirmed Vander Esch would miss the rest of the 2023 season.

=== Retirement ===
On March 15, 2024, Vander Esch was released by the Cowboys after six seasons with the team. Three days later, he announced his retirement from football for medical reasons. He had dealt with multiple neck issues over the course of his career.

== NFL career statistics ==
Legend
**Bold**	Career high

=== Regular season ===
Year	Team	Games		Tackles				Interceptions						Fumbles	
Year	Team	GP	GS	Cmb	Solo	Ast	Sck	PD	Int	Yds	Avg	Lng	TD	FF	FR
2018	DAL	16	11	**140**	**102**	**38**	0.0	**7**	**2**	**56**	**28.0**	**28**	0	0	0
2019	DAL	9	9	72	43	29	0.5	3	0	0	0.0	0	0	**1**	0
2020	DAL	10	10	60	32	28	**1.0**	0	0	0	0.0	0	0	**1**	**1**
2021	DAL	**17**	**16**	77	48	29	**1.0**	2	1	7	7.0	7	0	0	0
2022	DAL	14	14	90	54	36	**1.0**	1	0	0	0.0	0	0	**1**	0
2023	DAL	5	5	30	17	13	0.0	0	0	0	0.0	0	0	0	**1**
Career		71	65	469	296	173	3.5	13	3	63	21.0	28	0	3	2

=== Postseason ===
Year	Team	Games		Tackles				Interceptions						Fumbles	
Year	Team	GP	GS	Cmb	Solo	Ast	Sck	PD	Int	Yds	Avg	Lng	TD	FF	FR
2018	DAL	2	2	14	**9**	5	0.0	0	0	0	0.0	0	0	0	0
2021	DAL	1	1	13	5	8	0.0	0	0	0	0.0	0	0	0	0
2022	DAL	2	2	**20**	8	**12**	0.0	**2**	0	0	0.0	0	0	0	0
2023	DAL	0	0	Did not play due to injury											
Career		5	5	47	22	25	0.0	2	0	0	0.0	0	0	0	0

== Personal life ==
Vander Esch is a Christian. He is married to Madalynn Vander Esch. They have one daughter.

Vander Esch's younger cousin, Caleb Vander Esch, played college football as a wide receiver at South Dakota and professionally for the Arlington Renegades.
