= Kekaula Kaniho =

American football player

Profile
- Position: Safety

Personal information
- Born: Kahuku, Hawaii
- Listed height: 5 ft 10 in (1.78 m)
- Listed weight: 186 lb (84 kg)

Career information
- High school: Kahuku (Kahuku, HI)
- College: Boise State (2017–2021)
- NFL draft: 2022: undrafted

Career history
- Arizona Cardinals (2022)*
- * Offseason or practice squad member only

Awards and highlights
- First-team All-MW (2019); Second-team All-MW (2020); Las Vegas Bowl champion (2017)
- Stats at Pro Football Reference

Kekaula Kaniho is an American football safety. He played college football at Boise State University.

== College career ==
In 2020, he became the first Boise State player to ever win the Senior CLASS Award.

== Professional career ==
Pre-draft measurables
Height	Weight	Arm length	Hand span	40-yard dash	10-yard split	20-yard split	20-yard shuttle	Three-cone drill	Vertical jump	Broad jump
5 ft 10 1/4 in (1.78 m)	186 lb (84 kg)	30 1/8 in (0.77 m)	8 7/8 in (0.23 m)	4.64 s	1.65 s	2.63 s	4.43 s	6.71 s	34.5 in (0.88 m)	9 ft 3 in (2.82 m)
All values from Pro Day

Kaniho signed by the Arizona Cardinals as an undrafted free agent after the 2022 NFL draft. He was waived on May 16, 2022.
