= A. J. Richardson =

American football player (born 1995)

No. 7
- Position: Wide receiver

Personal information
- Born: June 2, 1995 (age 31); Lomita, California, U.S.
- Listed height: 6 ft 0 in (1.83 m)
- Listed weight: 212 lb (96 kg)

Career information
- High school: Narbonne (Los Angeles, California)
- College: Boise State (2014–2018)
- NFL draft: 2019: undrafted

Career history
- Arizona Cardinals (2019–2021)*; Michigan Panthers (2023)
- * Offseason or practice squad member only
- Stats at Pro Football Reference

A. J. Richardson (born June 2, 1995) is an American former football wide receiver. He played college football at Boise State and was signed by the Arizona Cardinals as an undrafted free agent in 2019.

== Early life ==
A. J. Richardson was born June 2, 1995, in Lomita, California and played football at Narbonne High School. During his high school career, as a senior, Richardson totaled 60 receptions for 1,000 yards and 18 touchdowns and rushed 22 times for 121 yards and four touchdown and was named a Semper Fidelis All-American, named to All-Marine League, all-city section and All-State teams.

== College career ==
Richardson attended Boise State and played 53 games where he starting 22, he finished his career with 99 receptions for 1,474 yards and 11 touchdowns, his senior season being his best with 54 receptions for 825 yards and 8 touchdowns while playing in all 13 games.

== Professional career ==
Pre-draft measurables
Height	Weight	Arm length	Hand span	40-yard dash	10-yard split	20-yard split	20-yard shuttle	Three-cone drill	Vertical jump	Broad jump	Bench press
5 ft 11 3/8 in (1.81 m)	202 lb (92 kg)	30 1/8 in (0.77 m)	9 1/2 in (0.24 m)	4.62 s	1.64 s	2.71 s	4.44 s	7.12 s	33.5 in (0.85 m)	9 ft 2 in (2.79 m)	11 reps
All values from Pro Day

=== Arizona Cardinals ===
After going undrafted in the 2019 NFL draft, Richardson signed with the Arizona Cardinals. On August 31, Richardson was waived during final roster cuts and was later re-signed to the practice squad, but released a day later. On September 30, Richardson was re-signed following an injury to Johnnie Dixon. On December 30, Richardson signed a futures contract with the Cardinals.

On September 5, 2020, Richardson was waived during final roster cuts, and re-signed to the practice squad a day later. He was placed on the practice squad/injured list on December 22, 2020, and signed a reserve/future contract after the season on January 5, 2021. He was waived on August 30, 2021.

=== Michigan Panthers ===
On October 22, 2022, Richardson signed with the Michigan Panthers of the United States Football League (USFL). He was not part of the roster after the 2024 UFL dispersal draft on January 15, 2024.
