= Diocemy Saint Juste =

American football player (born 1996)

No. 22
- Position: Running back

Personal information
- Born: c. 1994; Boynton Beach, Florida, U.S.
- Listed height: 5 ft 8 in (1.73 m)
- Listed weight: 200 lb (91 kg)

Career information
- High school: Santaluces Community (Lantana, Florida)
- College: Hawaii
- NFL draft: 2018: undrafted

Career history
- Jacksonville Jaguars (2018)*
- * Offseason or practice squad member only

Awards and highlights
- Second-team All-MWC (2017)

Diocemy "Dee" Saint Juste (born c. 1994) is an American former football running back. He played college football for the Hawaii Rainbow Warriors football team. As a senior in 2017, he ranked sixth among all Division I FBS players with 1,510 rushing yards during the regular season.

Saint Juste played high school football at Santaluces High School in Florida. He totaled 1,243 rushing yards and 16 touchdowns as a high-school senior in 2012. He joined the Hawaii football program in 2014.

During the 2016 season, Saint Juste rushed for 1,006 yards on 165 carries for an average of 6.1 yards per carry.

As a senior in 2017, he rushed for 202 yards against Western Carolina, 241 yards against Nevada, and 202 yards against San Jose State. During the 2017 regular season, he ranked sixth among all Division I FBS players with 1,510 rushing yards. He was selected as the most valuable player on the 2017 Hawaii Rainbow Warriors football team. He also broke Travis Sims' Hawaii single-season rushing record of 1,498 yards set in 1992.
