= 2017 Nevada Wolf Pack football team =

American college football season

2017 Nevada Wolf Pack football
- Conference: Mountain West Conference
- West Division
- Record: 3–9 (3–5 MW)
- Head coach: Jay Norvell (1st season)
- Offensive coordinator: Matt Mumme (1st season)
- Offensive scheme: Air raid
- Defensive coordinator: Jeff Casteel (1st season)
- Base defense: 3–3–5
- Home stadium: Mackay Stadium

2017 Mountain West Conference football standings
	Conf.			Overall
Team	W		L	W		L
Mountain Division
No. 22 Boise State xy$	7	–	1	11	–	3
Colorado State	5	–	3	7	–	6
Wyoming	5	–	3	8	–	5
Utah State	4	–	4	6	–	7
Air Force	4	–	4	5	–	7
New Mexico	1	–	7	3	–	9
West Division
Fresno State xy	7	–	1	10	–	4
San Diego State	6	–	2	10	–	3
UNLV	4	–	4	5	–	7
Nevada	3	–	5	3	–	9
Hawaii	1	–	7	3	–	9
San Jose State	1	–	7	2	–	11
Championship: Boise State 17, Fresno State 14
$ – Conference champion; x – Division champion/co-champions; y – Championship game participant; Rankings from AP Poll

The 2017 Nevada Wolf Pack football team represented the University of Nevada, Reno in the 2017 NCAA Division I FBS football season. The Wolf Pack were led by first–year head coach Jay Norvell and played their home games at Mackay Stadium. They were members of the West Division of the Mountain West Conference. They finished the season 3–9 and 3–5 in Mountain West play to finish in fourth place in the West Division.

== Preseason ==
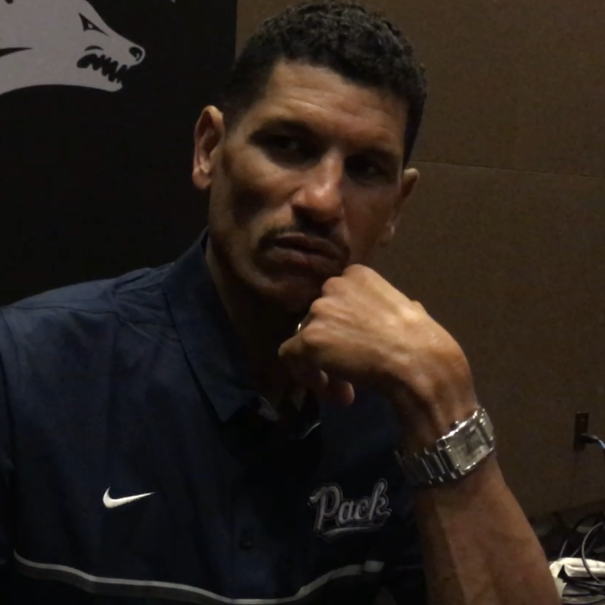
Head coach Jay Norvell at the 2017 Mountain West Conference Media Days at the Cosmopolitan of Las Vegas in Paradise, Nevada on July 25, 2017

=== Mountain West media days ===
The Mountain West media days were held on July 24–26, 2017, at the Cosmopolitan in Paradise, Nevada.

=== Media poll ===
The preseason poll was released on July 25, 2017. The Wolf Pack were predicted to finish in fourth place in the MW West Division.

=== Preseason All–Mountain West Team ===
The Wolf Pack had two players selected to the preseason All–Mountain West Team; one from the offense and one from the defense.

Offense

Austin Corbett – OL

Defense

Malik Reed – DL

== Schedule ==
Date	Time	Opponent	Site	TV	Result	Attendance
September 2	12:30 p.m.	at Northwestern*	Ryan Field; Evanston, IL	BTN	L 20–31	33,018
September 9	4:00 p.m.	Toledo*	Mackay Stadium; Reno, NV	ESPN3	L 24–37	18,617
September 16	4:00 p.m.	Idaho State (Div. I FCS)*	Mackay Stadium; Reno, NV	AT&T RM	L 28–30	16,394
September 23	3:00 p.m.	at No. 18 Washington State*	Martin Stadium; Pullman, WA	P12N	L 7–45	30,317
September 30	7:00 p.m.	at Fresno State	Bulldog Stadium; Fresno, CA	AT&T RM	L 21–41	27,434
October 7	7:30 p.m.	Hawaii	Mackay Stadium; Reno, NV	CBSSN	W 35–21	16,566
October 14	7:15 p.m.	at Colorado State	Colorado State Stadium; Fort Collins, CO	ESPN2	L 42–44	36,765
October 20	6:30 p.m.	Air Force^{†}	Mackay Stadium; Reno, NV	CBSSN	L 42–45	16,789
November 4	4:00 p.m.	at Boise State	Albertsons Stadium; Boise, ID (rivalry)	ESPNU	L 14–41	30,858
November 11	1:00 p.m.	San Jose State	Mackay Stadium; Reno, NV	ESPN3	W 59–14	14,604
November 18	7:30 p.m.	at San Diego State	SDCCU Stadium; San Diego, CA	CBSSN	L 23–42	29,265
November 25	12:00 p.m.	UNLV	Mackay Stadium; Reno, NV (Battle for the Fremont Cannon / Governor's Series)	AT&T RM	W 23–16	17,359
*Non-conference game; ^{†}Homecoming; Rankings from AP Poll released prior to the game; All times are in Pacific time

== Personnel ==
2017 Nevada Wolf Pack football team roster
Players
Coaches
Offense

Pos.	#	Name	Class
WR	1	McLane Mannix	Fr
WR	4	Elijah Cooks	Fr
RB	6	Jaxson Kincaide	So
QB	6	Ty Gangi (C)	Jr
WR	7	Kaleb Fossum	Jr
QB	8	Kaymen Cureton	Fr
QB	10	Griffin Dahn	So
WR	11	Dominic Christian	So
QB	12	David Cornwell	Jr
QB	13	Cristian Solano	So
WR	14	Theo Goodwin	Fr
TE	15	Trevion Armstrong	Fr
WR	16	Brandon Thompson	Jr
RB	17	Ryan Mack	Sr
WR	18	Reese Neville	Fr
WR	19	Wyatt Demps	Sr
WR	22	Jimbo Davis IV	Sr
RB	23	Kelton Moore	So
RB	32	Russell Booze	Fr
RB	33	Blake Wright	Jr
WR	40	Devin Porter	So
TE	43	Colin Flannery	So
TE	44	Kori Collons	So
TE	49	Trae Carter-Wells	Jr
OL	50	Chase Windham	Fr
OL	54	Alex Tancreto	Fr
OL	60	Dylan Porter	Fr
TE	61	Reagan Roberson	Fr
OL	62	Anthony Palomares	Jr
OL	64	Sean Krepsz	Jr
OL	65	Clifford Porter	So
OL	67	Gray Davis	Fr
RB	68	Roger Neal	Fr
OL	70	Nathan Edwards	Fr
OL	71	Jake Nelson	Jr
OL	73	Austin Corbett	Sr
OL	74	Kevin Spencer	Fr
OL	75	Carl Burton-Hill	Fr
OL	76	Nate Brown	Fr
OL	77	Ziad Damanhoury	Jr
WR	81	Hunter Juarez	Fr
WR	82	Tucker Melcher	Sr
WR	82	Ian Zamudio	Fr
WR	83	Andrew Celis	Jr
OL	85	Miles Beach	Fr
TE	88	Brandon Scott	Jr
OL	91	Kalei Meyer	Jr

Defense

Pos.	#	Name	Class
DB	1	Vosean Crumbie	Jr
DB	2	Asauni Rufus	Jr
DB	3	Ahki Muhammad	Jr
DB	4	E.J. Muhammad	So
DB	5	Dameon Baber	Jr
LB	6	Nephi Sewell	Fr
LB	7	Gabriel Sewell	So
DB	8	Jaden Sawyer	Sr
DB	9	Justin Brent	Jr
DB	9	Marcus Lucas	Fr
LB	10	Lamin Touray	Fr
LB	11	Daiyan Henley	Fr
DB	12	Daq Irby	Fr
DB	13	Brandon Brooks	Jr
DB	14	Mar'Quette Jackson	Fr
DB	15	Berdale Robins	Fr
DB	16	Kevin Howell	Fr
DB	18	Elijah Moody	Jr
DB	19	Daylon Johnson	Fr
LB	23	D.J. Powe	Fr
LB	24	Lucas Weber	Jr
DB	24	Tyson Williams	Fr
LB	25	Maliek Broady	So
DB	25	Daniel Brown	So
DB	26	Kendall Johnson	Sr
DB	28	Austin Arnold	Fr
DB	29	Isaiah Hamilton	Fr
LB	30	Lawson Hall	Fr
DB	33	Morris Bowman	Fr
LB	34	Travis Wilson	Sr
LB	36	Tyler Crandall	So
DB	37	David Kruskamp	Jr
LB	38	A.J. Arrington	Fr
DL	39	Ricky Thomas Jr.	So
LB	45	Trevor Price	Fr
DB	46	Anthony Hankins	Jr
DL	47	Kameron Toomer	Fr
LB	50	Austin Paulhus	Sr
DL	51	Dom Peterson	Fr
LB	52	Kyle Adams	So
LB	53	Alex Talladino	Jr
DL	54	Chris Green	Fr
LB	55	Brock Ruggeroli	Fr
LB	56	Sheldon Wilkinson	Fr
DL	57	Jaden Lewis	Fr
DL	63	Amir Johnson	Fr
DL	66	Thomas Newton	Sr
LB	67	Alec Bonsall	Jr
DL	69	Sam Hammond	Fr
DL	78	Jarius McDade	Sr
LB	90	Malik Reed	Jr
DL	92	Nick Gregg	Fr
DL	93	Jordan Silva	Jr
DL	94	Jacob Drahos	Fr
DL	95	Patrick Choudja	Sr
DL	96	Hausia Sekona	So
DL	99	Korey Rush	Jr

Special teams

Pos.	#	Name	Class
PK	26	Ramiz Ahmed	Jr
P	35	Quinton Conaway	So
LS	42	Wes Farnsworth	Jr
PK	48	Spencer Pettit	So
LS	58	Zac Grant	Fr
PK	97	Troy Calderara	Fr
LS	98	Karson Thomas	Fr

Head coach

- Jay Norvell

Coordinators/assistant coaches

- Matt Mumme – Offensive coordinator/quarterbacks
- Jeff Casteel – Defensive coordinator/linebackers
- Timmy Chang – Inside receivers
- Jason Kaufusi – Defensive line
- Matt Kirk – Safeties
- Mason Miller – Offensive line
- Eric Scott – Outside receivers
- Courtney Viney – Cornerbacks
- David White – Running backs/recruiting
- Tommy Perry – Senior Special Teams Analyst
- Vai Taua – Special teams analyst
- Jeff Nady – Graduate assistant (Offense)
- Brandon Crosby – Graduate assistant (Offense)
- John Landwehr – Graduate assistant (Defense)
- Alec Drudi – Graduate assistant (Defense)

Support staff

- Jordon Simmons – Director of football strength and conditioning
- Mike Bradeson – Director of high school relations
- Vince Hug – Director of football operations
- Ryan Rezac – Director of player personnel and recruiting
- Zach Machen – Assistant director of player personnel and recruiting
- Chad Hartley – Associate Athletic Director, Marketing and Communications (Football)
- Julia Bucchere – Administrative assistant

Legend

- (C) Team captain
- (S) Suspended
- (I) Ineligible
- Injured
- Redshirt

Roster
Last update: February 7, 2021

== Game summaries ==
=== At Northwestern ===
Nevada at Northwestern

Team	1	2	3	4	Total
Wolf Pack	7	10	0	3	20
• Wildcats	7	0	10	14	31

- Date: September 2, 2017
- Location: Ryan Field
  Evanston, IL
- Game start: 2:40 p.m. CDT
- Elapsed time: 3 hours and 24 minutes
- Game attendance: 33,018
- Game weather: Temperature: 69 °F (21 °C) • Weather: Cloudy • Wind: NE 5 MPH
- Referee: Timothy O'Dey
- TV announcers (BTN): Brandon Gaudin (play–by–play), Chuck Long (analyst) and Michelle McMahon (sideline)

Scoring summary
1	07:13	NU	Macan Wilson 33–yard pass from Clayton Thorson (Charlie Kuhbander kick) (5 plays, 43 yards, 2:06)	NU 7–0
1	05:31	NEV	Wyatt Demps 11–yard pass from Ty Gangi (Spencer Pettit kick) (8 plays, 75 yards, 1:42)	TIE 7–7
2	09:48	NEV	Mannix McLane 41–yard pass from Ty Gangi (Spencer Pettit kick) (4 plays, 51 yards, 0:55)	NEV 14–7
2	00:36	NEV	Spencer Pettit 31–yard field goal (11 plays, 73 yards, 2:25)	NEV 17–7
3	11:36	NU	Charlie Kuhbander 23–yard field goal (10 plays, 49 yards, 2:31)	NEV 17–10
3	06:16	NU	Riley Lees 19–yard pass from Clayton Thorson (Charlie Kuhbander kick) (8 plays, 70 yards, 3:28)	TIE 17–17
4	10:13	NEV	Spencer Pettit 33–yard field goal (4 plays, 1 yard, 1:18)	NEV 20–17
4	05:28	NU	Clayton Thorson 1–yard run (Charlie Kuhbander kick) (11 plays, 75 yards, 4:45)	NU 24–20
4	00:52	NU	Clayton Thorson 1–yard run (Charlie Kuhbander kick) (6 plays, 47 yards, 2:37)	NU 31–20

Statistics	Nevada	Northwestern
First downs	19	27
Total yards	341	508
Rushing yards	142	156
Passing yards	199	352
Turnovers	3	2
Time of possession	21:05	38:55

Team	Category	Player	Statistics
Nevada	Passing	Ty Gangi	16/37, 199 yards, 2 TDs, 1 INT
Nevada	Rushing	Jaxson Kincaide	15 carries, 86 yards
Nevada	Receiving	McLane Mannix	2 receptions, 76 yards, 1 TD
Northwestern	Passing	Clayton Thorson	28/38, 352 yards, 2 TDs, 1 INT
Northwestern	Rushing	Justin Jackson	30 carries, 109 yards
Northwestern	Receiving	Ben Skowronek	8 receptions, 123 yards

=== Toledo ===
Toledo at Nevada

Team	1	2	3	4	Total
• Rockets	10	10	14	3	37
Wolf Pack	3	7	14	0	24

- Date: September 9, 2017
- Location: Mackay Stadium
  Reno, NV
- Game start: 4:05 p.m. PDT
- Elapsed time: 3 hours and 35 minutes
- Game attendance: 18,617
- Game weather: Temperature: 81 °F (27 °C) • Weather: Sunny • Wind: None
- Referee: Ron Hudson
- TV announcers (ESPN3): Trey Bender (play–by–play) and Jay Taylor (analyst)

Scoring summary
1	10:51	TOLEDO	Jameson Vest 25–yard field goal (9 plays, 38 yards, 2:11)	TOLEDO 3–0
1	08:54	NEV	Spencer Pettit 47–yard field goal (6 plays, 45 yards, 1:57)	TIE 3–3
1	03:21	TOLEDO	Diontae Johnson 12–yard pass from Logan Woodside (Jameson Vest kick) (8 plays, 50 yards, 3:06)	TOLEDO 10–3
2	10:59	TOLEDO	Terry Swanson 3–yard run (Jameson Vest kick) (5 plays, 34 yards, 1:53)	TOLEDO 17–3
2	05:17	TOLEDO	Jameson Vest 26–yard field goal (12 plays, 60 yards, 4:56)	TOLEDO 20–3
2	00:52	NEV	Daiyan Henley 19–yard pass from Ty Gangi (Spencer Pettit kick) (13 plays, 75 yards, 4:25)	TOLEDO 20–10
3	08:41	TOLEDO	Terry Swanson 1–yard run (Jameson Vest kick) (13 plays, 75 yards, 6:19)	TOLEDO 27–10
3	07:11	NEV	Ty Gangi 1–yard run (Spencer Pettit kick) (6 plays, 75 yards, 1:30)	TOLEDO 27–17
3	03:45	TOLEDO	Cody Thompson 8–yard pass from Logan Woodside (Jameson Vest kick) (7 plays, 75 yards, 3:26)	TOLEDO 34–17
3	03:36	NEV	McLane Mannix 75–yard pass from Ty Gangi (Spencer Pettit kick) (1 play, 75 yards, 0:09)	TOLEDO 34–24
4	04:31	TOLEDO	Jameson Vest 23–yard field goal (9 plays, 31 yards, 4:18)	TOLEDO 37–24

Statistics	Toledo	Nevada
First downs	28	22
Total yards	426	386
Rushing yards	194	109
Passing yards	232	277
Turnovers	0	3
Time of possession	40:14	19:46

Team	Category	Player	Statistics
Toledo	Passing	Logan Woodside	19/27, 232 yards, 2 TDs
Toledo	Rushing	Terry Swanson	27 carries, 101 yards, 2 TDs
Toledo	Receiving	Cody Thompson	8 receptions, 101 yards, 1 TD
Nevada	Passing	Ty Gangi	19/37, 277 yards, 2 TDs, 1 INT
Nevada	Rushing	Jaxson Kincaide	12 carries, 63 yards
Nevada	Receiving	McLane Mannix	6 receptions, 139 yards, 1 TD

=== Idaho State ===
Idaho State at Nevada

Team	1	2	3	4	Total
• Bengals (Div. I FCS)	10	13	7	0	30
Wolf Pack	0	7	7	14	28

- Date: September 16, 2017
- Location: Mackay Stadium
  Reno, NV
- Game start: 4:08 p.m. PDT
- Elapsed time: 3 hours and 25 minutes
- Game attendance: 16,394
- Game weather: Temperature: 74 °F (23 °C) • Weather: Overcast • Wind: E 7 MPH
- Referee: Stephen Baron
- TV announcers (AT&T RM): Ari Wolfe (play–by–play), Sherdrick Bonner (analyst) and Brad Thompson (sideline)

Scoring summary
1	10:57	ISU	Parker Johnson 36–yard field goal (10 plays, 50 yards, 2:29)	ISU 3–0
1	06:45	ISU	Ty Flanagan 1–yard run (Parker Johnson kick) (6 plays, 25 yards, 1:44)	ISU 10–0
2	11:31	NEV	Mannix McLane 2–yard pass from Kaymen Cureton (Spencer Pettit kick) (13 plays, 58 yards, 6:08)	ISU 10–7
2	09:27	ISU	Parker Johnson 36–yard field goal (7 plays, 56 yards, 2:04)	ISU 13–7
2	03:12	ISU	Hagen Graves 15–yard pass from Tanner Gueller (Parker Johnson kick) (9 plays, 57 yards, 2:48)	ISU 20–7
2	00:10	ISU	Parker Johnson 19–yard field goal (6 plays, 31 yards, 1:10)	ISU 23–7
3	10:00	ISU	Michael Dean 50–yard pass from Tanner Gueller (Parker Johnson kick) (5 plays, 80 yards, 1:59)	ISU 30–7
3	07:10	NEV	Blake Wright 12–yard run (Spencer Pettit kick) (8 plays, 65 yards, 2:42)	ISU 30–14
4	09:42	NEV	Wyatt Demps 10–yard pass from Kaymen Cureton (Trevion Armstrong kick) (12 plays, 67 yards, 3:45)	ISU 30–21
4	00:58	NEV	Wyatt Demps 3–yard pass from Kaymen Cureton (pass failed) (8 plays, 78 yards, 3:11)	ISU 30–28

Statistics	Idaho State	Nevada
First downs	18	25
Total yards	383	423
Rushing yards	114	218
Passing yards	269	205
Turnovers	1	9
Time of possession	24:34	35:26

Team	Category	Player	Statistics
Idaho State	Passing	Tanner Gueller	19/38, 269 yards, 2 TDs
Idaho State	Rushing	James Madison	17 carries, 84 yards
Idaho State	Receiving	Michael Dean	5 receptions, 133 yards, 1 TD
Nevada	Passing	Kaymen Cureton	19/33, 205 yards, 3 TDs, 1 INT
Nevada	Rushing	Jaxson Kincaide	15 carries, 96 yards
Nevada	Receiving	McLane Mannix	7 receptions, 82 yards, 1 TD

=== At Washington State ===
Nevada at Washington State

Team	1	2	3	4	Total
Wolf Pack	0	0	0	7	7
• No. 18 Cougars	14	21	3	7	45

- Date: September 23, 2017
- Location: Martin Stadium
  Pullman, WA
- Game start: 3:01 p.m. PDT
- Elapsed time: 2 hours and 59 minutes
- Game attendance: 30,317
- Game weather: Temperature: 57 °F (14 °C) • Weather: Broken Clouds • Wind: 0–5 MPH
- Referee: Chris Coyte
- TV announcers (P12N): Ted Robinson (play–by–play), Yogi Roth (analyst) and Jill Savage (sideline)

Scoring summary
1	07:34	WSU	Jamal Morrow 12–yard pass from Luke Falk (Erik Powell kick) (6 plays, 76 yards, 1:58)	WSU 7–0
1	03:24	WSU	James Williams 13–yard pass from Luke Falk (Erik Powell kick) (7 plays, 64 yards, 3:11)	WSU 14–0
2	12:50	WSU	Tavares Martin 40–yard pass from Luke Falk (Erik Powell kick) (6 plays, 73 yards, 2:37)	WSU 21–0
2	06:35	WSU	James Williams 1–yard run (Erik Powell kick) (10 plays, 86 yards, 4:22)	WSU 28–0
2	00:20	WSU	Jamire Calvin 6–yard pass from Luke Falk (Erik Powell kick) (11 plays, 80 yards, 4:24)	WSU 35–0
3	12:34	WSU	Erik Powell 28–yard field goal (5 plays, 64 yards, 2:26)	WSU 38–0
4	12:06	WSU	Tavares Martin 19–yard pass from Luke Falk (Erik Powell kick) (11 plays, 65 yards, 5:00)	WSU 45–0
4	01:56	NEV	Maliek Broady 3–yard run (Spencer Pettit kick) (8 plays, 38 yards, 3:48)	WSU 45–7

Statistics	Nevada	Washington State
First downs	13	31
Total yards	151	560
Rushing yards	46	55
Passing yards	105	505
Turnovers	0	3
Time of possession	21:14	38:46

Team	Category	Player	Statistics
Nevada	Passing	David Cornwell	13/25, 97 yards, 3 INTs
Nevada	Rushing	Blake Wright	5 carries, 37 yards
Nevada	Receiving	Wyatt Demps	6 receptions, 39 yards
Washington State	Passing	Luke Falk	36/47, 478 yards, 5 TDs
Washington State	Rushing	Jamal Morrow	11 carries, 73 yards
Washington State	Receiving	Tavares Martin	4 receptions, 114 yards, 2 TDs

=== At Fresno State ===
Nevada at Fresno State

Team	1	2	3	4	Total
Wolf Pack	0	14	0	7	21
• Bulldogs	10	21	7	3	41

- Date: September 30, 2017
- Location: Bulldog Stadium
  Fresno, CA
- Game start: 7:08 p.m. PDT
- Elapsed time: 3 hours and 12 minutes
- Game attendance: 27,434
- Game weather: Temperature: 79 °F (26 °C) • Weather: Clear • Wind: WNW 11 MPH
- Referee: David Alvarez
- TV announcers (AT&T RM): Ari Wolfe (play–by–play), Sherdrick Bonner (analyst) and Brad Thompson (sideline)

Scoring summary
1	13:21	FS	KeeSean Johnson 10–yard pass from Marcus McMaryion (Jimmy Camacho kick) (4 plays, 29 yards, 1:39)	FS 7–0
1	00:00	FS	Jimmy Camacho 29–yard field goal (12 plays, 63 yards, 6:37)	FS 10–0
2	13:12	FS	KeeSean Johnson 16–yard pass from Josh Hokit (Jimmy Camacho kick) (3 plays, 73 yards, 1:01)	FS 17–0
2	05:05	FS	Jaron Bryant 18–yard interception (Jimmy Camacho kick)	FS 24–0
2	02:08	FS	KeeSean Johnson 40–yard pass from Marcus McMaryion (Jimmy Camacho kick) (4 plays, 73 yards, 1:24)	FS 31–0
2	00:54	NEV	Wyatt Demps 17–yard pass from Ty Gangi (Spencer Pettit kick) (6 plays, 75 yards, 1:26)	FS 31–7
2	00:35	NEV	Trevion Armstrong 21–yard pass from Ty Gangi (Spencer Pettit kick) (1 play, 21 yards, 0:07)	FS 31–14
3	07:58	FS	Ronnie Rivers 5–yard run (Jimmy Camacho kick) (6 plays, 56 yards, 2:41)	FS 38–14
4	02:44	FS	Jimmy Camacho 27–yard field goal (10 plays, 48 yards, 7:28)	FS 41–14
4	00:23	NEV	Blake Wright 2–yard run (Spencer Pettit kick) (12 plays, 73 yards, 2:21)	FS 41–21

Statistics	Nevada	Fresno State
First downs	16	22
Total yards	314	504
Rushing yards	61	192
Passing yards	253	312
Turnovers	0	6
Time of possession	22:52	37:08

Team	Category	Player	Statistics
Nevada	Passing	Ty Gangi	31/48, 253 yards, 2 TDs, 3 INTs
Nevada	Rushing	Kelton Moore	5 carries, 26 yards
Nevada	Receiving	Wyatt Demps	10 receptions, 96 yards, 1 TD
Fresno State	Passing	Marcus McMaryion	24/32, 296 yards, 2 TDs, 1 INT
Fresno State	Rushing	Ronnie Rivers	12 carries, 82 yards, 1 TD
Fresno State	Receiving	KeeSean Johnson	7 receptions, 104 yards, 3 TDs

=== Hawaii ===
Hawaii at Nevada

Team	1	2	3	4	Total
Rainbow Warriors	7	7	7	0	21
• Wolf Pack	7	14	7	7	35

- Date: October 7, 2017
- Location: Mackay Stadium
  Reno, NV
- Game start: 7:37 p.m. PDT
- Elapsed time: 3 hours and 38 minutes
- Game attendance: 16,566
- Game weather: Temperature: 70 °F (21 °C) • Weather: Clear and Perfect • Wind: W 12 MPH
- Referee: Michael VanderVelde
- TV announcers (CBSSN): Rich Waltz (play–by–play), Aaron Murray (analyst) and Jordan Daigle (sideline)

Scoring summary
1	04:52	UH	John Ursua 10–yard pass from Dru Brown (Alex Trifonovitch kick) (6 plays, 80 yards, 2:53)	UH 7–0
1	02:30	NEV	Mannix McLane 7–yard pass from Ty Gangi (Spencer Pettit kick) (5 plays, 91 yards, 2:17)	TIE 7–7
2	03:55	UH	Kade Greeley 42–yard pass from Dru Brown (Alex Trifonovitch kick) (8 plays, 84 yards, 4:53)	UH 14–7
2	02:32	NEV	Ty Gangi 17–yard run (Spencer Pettit kick) (4 plays, 75 yards, 1:23)	TIE 14–14
2	00:18	NEV	Wyatt Demps 2–yard pass from Ty Gangi (Spencer Pettit kick) (4 plays, 66 yards, 0:26)	NEV 21–14
3	01:56	NEV	Kelton Moore 22–yard pass from Ty Gangi (Spencer Pettit kick) (5 plays, 46 yards, 2:00)	NEV 28–14
3	01:45	UH	Diocemy Saint Juste 75–yard run (Alex Trifonovitch kick) (1 play, 75 yards, 0:11)	NEV 28–21
4	11:16	NEV	Wyatt Demps 32–yard pass from Ty Gangi (Spencer Pettit kick) (4 plays, 36 yards, 1:44)	NEV 35–21

Statistics	Hawaii	Nevada
First downs	20	26
Total yards	477	566
Rushing yards	248	268
Passing yards	229	298
Turnovers	3	4
Time of possession	29:01	30:59

Team	Category	Player	Statistics
Hawaii	Passing	Dru Brown	18/27, 229 yards, 2 TDs, 1 INT
Hawaii	Rushing	Diocemy Saint Juste	25 carries, 241 yards, 1 TD
Hawaii	Receiving	John Ursua	9 receptions, 126 yards, 1 TD
Nevada	Passing	Ty Gangi	25/32, 278 yards, 4 TDs, 1 INT
Nevada	Rushing	Kelton Moore	19 carries, 216 yards
Nevada	Receiving	Wyatt Demps	7 receptions, 111 yards, 2 TDs

=== At Colorado State ===
Nevada at Colorado State

Team	1	2	3	4	Total
Wolf Pack	14	7	21	0	42
• Rams	14	14	10	6	44

- Date: October 14, 2017
- Location: Colorado State Stadium
  Fort Collins, CO
- Game start: 8:26 p.m. MDT
- Elapsed time: 3 hours and 39 minutes
- Game attendance: 36,765
- Game weather: Temperature: 43 °F (6 °C) • Weather: Clear • Wind: E 7 MPH
- Referee: Kevin Hassell
- TV announcers (ESPN2): Clay Matvick (play–by–play) and Kirk Morrison (analyst)

Scoring summary
1	13:34	CSU	Michael Gallup 56–yard pass from Nick Stevens (Wyatt Bryan kick) (4 plays, 75 yards, 1:26)	CSU 7–0
1	09:56	CSU	Michael Gallup 7–yard pass from Nick Stevens (Wyatt Bryan kick) (5 plays, 69 yards, 1:55)	CSU 14–0
1	02:54	NEV	Trevion Armstrong 5–yard pass from Ty Gangi (Spencer Pettit kick) (15 plays, 77 yards, 6:57)	CSU 14–7
1	01:12	NEV	Mannix McLane 57–yard pass from Kelton Moore (Spencer Pettit kick) (1 play, 57 yards, 0:10)	TIE 14–14
2	12:25	CSU	Izzy Matthews 1–yard run (Wyatt Bryan kick) (9 plays, 61 yards, 3:41)	CSU 21–14
2	08:17	NEV	Kelton Moore 1–yard run (Spencer Pettit kick) (9 plays, 75 yards, 4:08)	TIE 21–21
2	04:36	CSU	Dalton Fackrell 14–yard pass from Nick Stevens (Wyatt Bryan kick) (8 plays, 75 yards, 3:41)	CSU 28–21
3	09:50	NEV	Daiyan Henley 6–yard pass from Ty Gangi (Spencer Pettit kick) (6 plays, 95 yards, 2:26)	TIE 28–28
3	09:04	NEV	Wyatt Demps 65–yard pass from Ty Gangi (Spencer Pettit kick) (1 play, 65 yards, 0:10)	NEV 35–28
3	04:52	CSU	Wyatt Bryan 51–yard field goal (4 plays, 5 yards, 1:37)	NEV 35–31
3	03:13	NEV	Brendan O'Leary-Orange 55–yard pass from Ty Gangi (Spencer Pettit kick) (3 plays, 68 yards, 1:30)	NEV 42–31
3	01:57	CSU	Dalyn Dawkins 59–yard run (Wyatt Bryan kick) (3 plays, 82 yards, 1:09)	NEV 42–38
4	12:08	CSU	Michael Gallup 17–yard pass from Nick Stevens (Wyatt Bryan kick failed) (11 plays, 74 yards, 3:08)	CSU 44–42

Statistics	Nevada	Colorado State
First downs	23	23
Total yards	564	608
Rushing yards	56	224
Passing yards	508	384
Turnovers	1	3
Time of possession	30:50	29:10

Team	Category	Player	Statistics
Nevada	Passing	Ty Gangi	23/40, 428 yards, 4 TDs
Nevada	Rushing	Kelton Moore	14 carries, 29 yards, 1 TD
Nevada	Receiving	McLane Mannix	7 receptions, 150 yards, 1 TD
Colorado State	Passing	Nick Stevens	26/37, 384 yards, 4 TDs
Colorado State	Rushing	Dalyn Dawkins	17 carries, 191 yards, 1 TD
Colorado State	Receiving	Michael Gallup	13 receptions, 263 yards, 3 TDs

=== Air Force ===
Air Force at Nevada

Team	1	2	3	4	Total
• Falcons	7	21	7	10	45
Wolf Pack	14	6	8	14	42

- Date: October 20, 2017
- Location: Mackay Stadium
  Reno, NV
- Game start: 6:37 p.m. PDT
- Elapsed time: 3 hours and 29 minutes
- Game attendance: 16,789
- Game weather: Temperature: 46 °F (8 °C) • Weather: Cool • Wind: W 12 MPH
- Referee: Kevin Boitmann
- TV announcers (CBSSN): Rich Waltz (play–by–play), Aaron Murray (analyst) and Cassie McKinney (sideline)

Scoring summary
1	11:19	NEV	Mannix McLane 14–yard pass from Ty Gangi (Spencer Pettit kick) (9 plays, 75 yards, 3:41)	NEV 7–0
1	02:46	AF	Garrett Amy 5–yard run (Luke Strebel kick) (10 play, 71 yards, 3:57)	TIE 7–7
1	02:05	NEV	Wyatt Demps 28–yard pass from Andrew Celis (Spencer Pettit kick) (3 plays, 75 yards, 0:41)	NEV 14–7
2	14:38	AF	Taven Birdow 3–yard run (Luke Strebel kick) (6 plays, 93 yards, 2:22)	TIE 14–14
2	13:09	NEV	Spencer Pettit 35–yard field goal (6 plays, 29 yards, 1:29)	NEV 17–14
2	10:25	NEV	Spencer Pettit 37–yard field goal (7 plays, 34 yards, 1:21)	NEV 20–14
2	03:18	AF	Tim McVey 4–yard run (Luke Strebel kick) (15 plays, 75 yards, 7:07)	AF 21–20
2	02:09	AF	Ronald Cleveland 43–yard run (Luke Strebel kick) (4 plays, 54 yards, 1:08)	AF 28–20
3	12:02	NEV	Ty Gangi 13–yard run (Wyatt Demps pass) (6 plays, 37 yards, 1:36)	TIE 28–28
3	02:09	AF	Arion Worthman 1–yard run (Luke Strebel kick) (20 plays, 82 yards, 9:47)	AF 35–28
4	11:39	NEV	Kelton Moore 1–yard run (Spencer Pettit kick) (7 plays, 56 yards, 2:40)	TIE 35–35
4	06:43	AF	Arion Worthman 3–yard run (Luke Strebel kick) (12 plays, 75 yards, 4:51)	AF 42–35
4	03:57	NEV	Daiyan Henley 31–yard pass from Ty Gangi (Spencer Pettit kick) (7 plays, 82 yards, 2:41)	TIE 42–42
4	00:00	AF	Luke Strebel 30–yard field goal (12 plays, 62 yards, 3:57)	AF 45–42

Statistics	Air Force	Nevada
First downs	36	21
Total yards	591	424
Rushing yards	550	157
Passing yards	41	267
Turnovers	5	1
Time of possession	41:20	18:40

Team	Category	Player	Statistics
Air Force	Passing	Arion Worthman	4/7, 41 yards, 1 INT
Air Force	Rushing	Tim McVey	18 carries, 139 yards, 1 TD
Air Force	Receiving	Marcus Bennett	2 receptions, 28 yards
Nevada	Passing	Ty Gangi	17/33, 239 yards, 2 TDs
Nevada	Rushing	Kelton Moore	14 carries, 101 yards, 1 TD
Nevada	Receiving	Brendan O'Leary–Orange	3 receptions, 90 yards

=== At Boise State ===
Nevada at Boise State
(rivalry)

Team	1	2	3	4	Total
Wolf Pack	7	7	0	0	14
• Broncos	10	21	7	3	41

- Date: November 4, 2017
- Location: Albertsons Stadium
  Boise, ID
- Game start: 5:02 p.m. MDT
- Elapsed time: 3 hours
- Game attendance: 30,858
- Game weather: Temperature: 42 °F (6 °C) • Weather: Partly Sunny • Wind: NW 9 MPH
- Referee: Stephen Baron
- TV announcers (ESPNU): Clay Matvick (play–by–play) and Kirk Morrison (analyst)

Scoring summary
1	08:45	NEV	Kelton Moore 4–yard run (Spencer Pettit kick) (13 plays, 75 yards, 6:15)	NEV 7–0
1	03:58	BSU	Haden Hoggarth 20–yard field goal (11 plays, 70 yards, 4:42)	NEV 7–3
1	01:42	BSU	Alexander Mattison 13–yard run (Haden Hoggarth kick) (7 plays, 37 yards, 1:11)	BSU 10–7
2	12:42	NEV	Trevion Armstrong 1–yard pass from Ty Gangi (Spencer Pettit kick) (8 plays, 75 yards, 4:00)	NEV 14–10
2	11:50	BSU	Cedrick Wilson Jr. 44–yard pass from Brett Rypien (Haden Hoggarth kick) (2 plays, 46 yards, 0:50)	BSU 17–14
2	05:35	BSU	Ryan Wolpin 1–yard run (Haden Hoggarth kick) (7 plays, 47 yards, 3:00)	BSU 24–14
2	00:31	BSU	Jake Roh 25–yard pass from Brett Rypien (Haden Hoggarth kick) (7 plays, 75 yards, 2:18)	BSU 31–14
3	11:03	BSU	Alexander Mattison 6–yard run (Haden Hoggarth kick) (8 plays, 71 yards, 3:57)	BSU 38–14
4	12:48	BSU	Haden Hoggarth 41–yard field goal (11 plays, 46 yards, 5:23)	BSU 41–14

Statistics	Nevada	Boise State
First downs	17	24
Total yards	302	479
Rushing yards	142	140
Passing yards	160	339
Turnovers	0	2
Time of possession	28:31	31:29

Team	Category	Player	Statistics
Nevada	Passing	Ty Gangi	24/37, 160 yards, 1 TD, 3 INTs
Nevada	Rushing	Kelton Moore	17 carries, 106 yards, 1 TD
Nevada	Receiving	Wyatt Demps	6 receptions, 61 yards
Boise State	Passing	Brett Rypien	20/27, 258 yards, 2 TDs
Boise State	Rushing	Alexander Mattison	12 carries, 64 yards, 2 TDs
Boise State	Receiving	Cedrick Wilson Jr.	5 receptions, 80 yards, 1 TD

=== San Jose State ===
San Jose State at Nevada

Team	1	2	3	4	Total
Spartans	7	0	0	7	14
• Wolf Pack	14	24	14	7	59

- Date: November 11, 2017
- Location: Mackay Stadium
  Reno, NV
- Game start: 1:05 p.m. PST
- Elapsed time: 3 hours and 14 minutes
- Game attendance: 14,604
- Game weather: Temperature: 55 °F (13 °C) • Weather: Cool and Sunny • Wind: SE 2 MPH
- Referee: Daniel Romeo
- TV announcers (ESPN3): Shawn Kenney (play–by–play) and Al Groh (analyst)

Scoring summary
1	05:51	SJSU	Tyler Nevens 12–yard run (Bryce Crawford kick) (3 plays, 28 yards, 0:55)	SJSU 7–0
1	03:02	NEV	Wyatt Demps 39–yard pass from Ty Gangi (Spencer Pettit kick) (7 plays, 75 yards, 2:49)	TIE 7–7
1	01:06	NEV	Dameon Baber 6–yard blocked punt return (Spencer Pettit kick)	NEV 14–7
2	11:55	NEV	Ty Gangi 1–yard run (Spencer Pettit kick) (9 plays, 70 yards, 3:09)	NEV 21–7
2	07:51	NEV	Dameon Baber 100–yard interception (Spencer Pettit kick)	NEV 28–7
2	04:28	NEV	Wyatt Demps 3–yard pass from Ty Gangi (Spencer Pettit kick) (5 plays, 75 yards, 1:31)	NEV 35–7
2	00:06	NEV	Spencer Pettit 20–yard field goal (6 plays, 22 yards, 0:42)	NEV 38–7
3	10:35	NEV	Jaxson Kincaide 6–yard pass (Spencer Pettit kick) (11 plays, 75 yards, 4:25)	NEV 45–7
3	01:17	NEV	Dameon Baber 39–yard interception (Spencer Pettit kick)	NEV 52–7
4	06:54	NEV	Blake Wright 7–yard run (Spencer Pettit kick) (7 plays, 54 yards, 2:34)	NEV 59–7
4	00:17	SJSU	Sean Pinson 12–yard pass from Michael Carrillo (Bryce Crawford kick) (4 plays, 48 yards, 1:00)	NEV 59–14

Statistics	San Jose State	Nevada
First downs	23	20
Total yards	302	441
Rushing yards	173	176
Passing yards	129	265
Turnovers	5	0
Time of possession	30:16	29:44

Team	Category	Player	Statistics
San Jose State	Passing	Montel Aaron	9/18, 108 yards, 3 INTs
San Jose State	Rushing	Tyler Nevens	21 carries, 118 yards, 1 TD
San Jose State	Receiving	Tre Hartley	2 receptions, 50 yards
Nevada	Passing	Ty Gangi	16/23, 232 yards, 3 TDs
Nevada	Rushing	Kelton Moore	20 carries, 79 yards
Nevada	Receiving	Wyatt Demps	7 receptions, 115 yards, 2 TDs

=== At San Diego State ===
Nevada at San Diego State

Team	1	2	3	4	Total
Wolf Pack	10	7	0	6	23
• Aztecs	14	7	7	14	42

- Date: November 18, 2017
- Location: SDCCU Stadium
  San Diego, CA
- Game start: 7:39 p.m. PST
- Elapsed time: 3 hours and 38 minutes
- Game attendance: 29,265
- Game weather: Temperature: 62 °F (17 °C) • Weather: Partly Cloudy • Wind: Calm
- Referee: David Alvarez
- TV announcers (CBSSN): Ben Holden (play–by–play), Jay Feely (analyst) and Tina Cervasio (sideline)

Scoring summary
1	06:07	NEV	Spencer Pettit 23–yard field goal (8 plays, 63 yards, 2:11)	NEV 3–0
1	05:44	NEV	Brendan O'Leary-Orange 48–yard pass from Ty Gangi (Spencer Pettit kick) (2 plays, 48 yards, 0:09)	NEV 10–0
1	03:45	SDSU	Rashaad Penny 23–yard run (John Baron II kick) (5 plays, 69 yards, 1:53)	NEV 10–7
1	02:05	SDSU	Rashaad Penny 70–yard punt return (John Baron II kick)	SDSU 14–10
2	09:07	NEV	Brendan O'Leary-Orange 9–yard pass from Ty Gangi (Spencer Pettit kick) (4 plays, 89 yards, 1:26)	NEV 17–14
2	00:39	SDSU	Mikah Holder 5–yard pass from Christian Chapman (8 plays, 52 yards, 2:19)	SDSU 21–17
3	09:22	SDSU	Juwan Washington 1–yard run (John Baron II kick) (9 plays, 70 yards, 3:37)	SDSU 28–17
4	13:43	NEV	Brendan O'Leary-Orange 2–yard pass from Ty Gangi (pass failed) (12 plays, 89 yards, 5:06)	SDSU 28–23
4	13:30	SDSU	Rashaad Penny 100–yard kickoff return (John Baron II kick)	SDSU 35–23
4	08:31	SDSU	Rashaad Penny 67–yard return (John Baron II kick) (2 plays, 79 yards, 0:35)	SDSU 42–23

Statistics	Nevada	San Diego State
First downs	18	25
Total yards	448	494
Rushing yards	34	289
Passing yards	414	205
Turnovers	2	2
Time of possession	26:11	33:49

Team	Category	Player	Statistics
Nevada	Passing	Ty Gangi	33/54, 414 yards, 3 TDs, 1 INT
Nevada	Rushing	Kelton Moore	13 carries, 18 yards
Nevada	Receiving	Brendan O'Leary–Orange	11 receptions, 214 yards, 3 TDs
San Diego State	Passing	Christian Chapman	15/23, 205 yards, 1 TD
San Diego State	Rushing	Rashaad Penny	24 carries, 222 yards, 2 TDs
San Diego State	Receiving	Mikah Holder	5 receptions, 85 yards, 1 TD

=== UNLV ===
UNLV at Nevada
(Battle for the Fremont Cannon / Governor's Series)

Team	1	2	3	4	Total
Rebels	0	13	3	0	16
• Wolf Pack	6	3	7	7	23

- Date: November 25, 2017
- Location: Mackay Stadium
  Reno, NV
- Game start: 12:08 p.m. PST
- Elapsed time: 2 hours and 56 minutes
- Game attendance: 17,359
- Game weather: Temperature: 62 °F (17 °C) • Weather: Partly Cloudy • Wind: SE 4 MPH
- Referee: Michael VanderVelde
- TV announcers (AT&T RM): Drew Goodman (play–by–play), Sherdrick Bonner (analyst) and Brad Thompson (sideline)

Scoring summary
1	14:03	NEV	Wyatt Demps 21–yard pass from Ty Gangi (Spencer Pettit kick blocked) (3 plays, 68 yards, 0:57)	NEV 6–0
2	14:47	UNLV	Armani Rogers 12–yard run (Evan Pantels kick) (12 plays, 88 yards, 5:07)	UNLV 7–6
2	08:56	UNLV	Evan Pantels 24–yard field goal (6 plays, 18 yards, 2:54)	UNLV 10–6
2	02:03	UNLV	Evan Pantels 37–yard field goal (13 plays, 49 yards, 5:25)	UNLV 13–6
2	00:21	NEV	Spencer Pettit 35–yard field goal (11 plays, 56 yards, 1:42)	UNLV 13–9
3	10:57	UNLV	Evan Pantels 53–yard field goal (10 plays, 29 yards, 4:03)	UNLV 16–9
3	00:41	NEV	Trevion Armstrong 6–yard pass from Ty Gangi (Spencer Pettit kick) (10 plays, 91 yards, 3:48)	TIE 16–16
4	07:34	NEV	Kelton Moore 1–yard run (Spencer Pettit kick) (8 plays, 61 yards, 3:18)	NEV 23–16

Statistics	UNLV	Nevada
First downs	22	18
Total yards	324	411
Rushing yards	164	117
Passing yards	160	294
Turnovers	3	3
Time of possession	36:30	23:30

Team	Category	Player	Statistics
UNLV	Passing	Armani Rogers	12/23, 160 yards
UNLV	Rushing	Lexington Thomas	15 carries, 63 yards
UNLV	Receiving	Brandon Presley	4 receptions, 59 yards
Nevada	Passing	Ty Gangi	24/33, 266 yards, 2 TDs, 1 INT
Nevada	Rushing	Kelton Moore	23 carries, 109 yards, 1 TD
Nevada	Receiving	McLane Mannix	7 receptions, 109 yards

== Players in the 2018 NFL draft ==
Player	Position	Round	Pick	NFL club
Austin Corbett	OL	2	33	Cleveland Browns
