= 2017 Mountain West Conference football season =

- League: NCAA Division I Football Bowl Subdivision
- Sport: Football
- Duration: August 2017 – January 2018
- Teams: 12
- TV partner(s): CBSSN, ABC, ESPN, ESPN2, ESPNU, CBS, AT&TSN

2018 NFL Draft
- Top draft pick: QB Josh Allen, Wyoming
- Picked by: Buffalo Bills, 7th overall

Regular season
- Mountain Division champions: Boise State Broncos
- Mountain Division runners-up: Wyoming Cowboys
- West Division champions: Fresno State Bulldogs
- West Division runners-up: San Diego State Aztecs

Championship Game
- Champions: Boise State
- Runners-up: Fresno State
- Finals MVP: QB Brett Rypien, Boise State; LB Leighton Vander Esch, Boise State

Football seasons
- 2016 2018

2017 Mountain West Conference football standings
	Conf.			Overall
Team	W		L	W		L
Mountain Division
No. 22 Boise State xy$	7	–	1	11	–	3
Colorado State	5	–	3	7	–	6
Wyoming	5	–	3	8	–	5
Utah State	4	–	4	6	–	7
Air Force	4	–	4	5	–	7
New Mexico	1	–	7	3	–	9
West Division
Fresno State xy	7	–	1	10	–	4
San Diego State	6	–	2	10	–	3
UNLV	4	–	4	5	–	7
Nevada	3	–	5	3	–	9
Hawaii	1	–	7	3	–	9
San Jose State	1	–	7	2	–	11
Championship: Boise State 17, Fresno State 14
$ – Conference champion; x – Division champion/co-champions; y – Championship game participant; Rankings from AP Poll

The 2017 Mountain West Conference football season, part of that year's NCAA Division I FBS football season, was the 19th season of college football for the Mountain West Conference (MW). Since 2012, 12 teams have competed in MW football—the conference's 11 full members, plus football-only member Hawaiʻi. The regular season began on August 26 and ended on November 25. The Mountain West Championship Game was played on December 2, where Mountain Division champion Boise State defeated West Division champion Fresno State to win their first Mountain West championship since 2014.

== Preseason ==
=== Mountain West Media ===
2017 Mountain West media days took place on July 25 & 26 at the Cosmopolitan.

=== Preseason Polls ===
Place	Mountain Division	West Division
1	Boise State (21) 161	San Diego State (28) 168
2	Colorado State (6) 135	Hawai'i 135
3	Wyoming (1) 114	UNLV 105
4	Air Force 82	Nevada 79
5	New Mexico 68	San Jose State 54
6	Utah State 28	Fresno State 47

- First place votes in parentheses

=== Preseason All–Mountain West Team ===
Offense
Position	Player	Class	Team
QB	Josh Allen**	JR.	Wyoming
WR	Michael Gallup*	SR.	Colorado State
WR	Devonte Boyd	SR.	UNLV
RB	Rashaad Penny*	SR.	San Diego State
RB	Tyrone Owens	JR.	New Mexico
OL	Jake Bennett**	SR.	Colorado State
OL	Austin Corbett**	SR.	Nevada
OL	Dejon Allen**	SR.	Hawai'i
OL	Aaron Jenkins	JR.	New Mexico
OL	Mason Hampton	SR.	Boise State
TE	David Wells**	SR.	San Diego State

Defense
Position	Player	Class	Team
DL	David Moa*	JR.	Boise State
DL	Malik Reed**	JR.	Nevada
DL	Garrett Hughes*	SR.	New Mexico
DL	Mike Hughes Jr.	SR.	UNLV
LB	Jahlani Tavai*	JR.	Hawai'i
LB	Logan Wilson	SO.	Wyoming
LB	Frank Ginda	JR.	San Jose State
DB	Andrew Wingard*	JR.	Wyoming
DB	Andre Chachere*	SR.	San Jose State
DB	Tyler Horton	JR.	Boise State
DB	Trayvon Henderson	SR.	Hawai'i

Specialists
Position	Player	Class	Team
P	Michael Carrizosa	SR.	San Jose State
PK	John Baron II*	JR.	San Diego State
RET	Rashaad Penny*	SR.	San Diego State

- Preseason Offensive Player of the Year:

Josh Allen, JR., QB, Wyoming

- Preseason Defensive Player of the Year:

Andrew Wingard, JR., DB, Wyoming

- Preseason Special Teams Player of the Year:

Rashaad Penny, SR., KR, San Diego State

(* – member of the 2016 All–Mountain West first team)

(** – member of the 2016 All–Mountain West second team)

== Coaches ==
NOTE: Stats shown are before the beginning of the season

Team	Head coach	Years at school	Overall record	Record at school	MW record
Air Force	Troy Calhoun	11	77–53	77–53	45–35
Boise State	Bryan Harsin	4	38–14	31–9	18–6
Colorado State	Mike Bobo	3	14–12	14–12	10–6
Fresno State	Jeff Tedford	1	82–57	0–0	0–0
Hawaiʻi	Nick Rolovich	2	7–7	7–7	4–4
Nevada	Jay Norvell	1	0–0	0–0	0–0
New Mexico	Bob Davie	6	62–61	27–36	15–25
San Diego State	Rocky Long	9	119–95	54–26	36–11
San José State	Brent Brennan	1	0–0	0–0	0–0
UNLV	Tony Sanchez	3	7–17	7–17	5–11
Utah State	Matt Wells	5	28–25	28–25	19–12
Wyoming	Craig Bohl	4	118–56	14–24	10–14

== Rankings ==
Listed are the Mountain West teams who were ranked or received votes at some point during the season. Air Force, Hawaii, Nevada, New Mexico, San Jose State, Utah State and UNLV were never ranked or received any votes.

Legend
	Improvement in ranking
	Drop in ranking
	Not ranked previous week
RV	Received votes but were not ranked in Top 25 of poll

		Pre	Wk 1	Wk 2	Wk 3	Wk 4	Wk 5	Wk 6	Wk 7	Wk 8	Wk 9	Wk 10	Wk 11	Wk 12	Wk 13	Wk 14	Final
Boise State Broncos	AP	RV	RV	RV							RV	RV	RV	25	RV	25	22
Boise State Broncos	C	RV	RV	RV	RV				RV	RV	RV	RV	RV	24	RV	25	22
Boise State Broncos	CFP	Not released											25	23		25	
Colorado State Rams	AP																
Colorado State Rams	C							RV	RV	RV							
Colorado State Rams	CFP	Not released															
Fresno State Bulldogs	AP													RV	25	RV	RV
Fresno State Bulldogs	C													RV	RV	RV	RV
Fresno State Bulldogs	CFP	Not released													25		
San Diego State Aztecs	AP	RV	RV	RV	22	19	19	19	RV	RV	RV	RV		RV	RV	RV	RV
San Diego State Aztecs	C	RV	RV	RV	25	21	21	18	RV		RV	RV	RV	RV	25	RV	RV
San Diego State Aztecs	CFP	Not released															
Wyoming Cowboys	AP																
Wyoming Cowboys	C	RV															
Wyoming Cowboys	CFP	Not released															

== Schedule ==
=== Regular season ===
Index to colors and formatting
Mountain West member won
Mountain West member lost
Mountain West teams in **bold**

==== Week One ====
Date	Time	Visiting team	Home team	Site	TV	Result	Attendance	Ref.
August 26	2:30 p.m.	Oregon State	**Colorado State**	Colorado State Stadium • Fort Collins, CO	CBSSN	**W** 58–27	37,583	
August 26	6:00 p.m.	**Hawaii**	UMass	Warren McGuirk Alumni Stadium • Hadley, MA	ELVN; SPEC	**W** 38–35	12,145	
August 26	5:30 p.m.	No. 19 South Florida	**San Jose State**	CEFCU Stadium • San Jose, CA	CBSSN	**L** 22–42	13,377	
September 1	8:00 p.m.	**Colorado State**	Colorado	Sports Authority Field at Mile High • Denver, CO (Rocky Mountain Showdown)	P12N	**L** 3–17	73,932	
September 1	9:00 p.m.	**Utah State**	No. 9 Wisconsin	Camp Randall Stadium • Madison, WI	ESPN	**L** 10–59	75,324	
September 2	12:00 p.m.	**Wyoming**	Iowa	Kinnick Stadium • Iowa City, IA	BTN	**L** 3–24	68,075	
September 2	2:00 p.m.	VMI	**Air Force**	Falcon Stadium • Colorado Springs, CO	ESPN3	**W** 63–0	37,286	
September 2	3:30 p.m.	**Nevada**	Northwestern	Ryan Field • Evanston, IL	BTN	**L** 20–31	33,018	
September 2	3:45 p.m.	Troy	**Boise State**	Albertsons Stadium • Boise, ID	ESPNU	**W** 24–13	31,581	
September 2	7:30 p.m.	Cal Poly	**San Jose State**	CEFCU Stadium • San Jose, CA		**W** 34–13	10,667	
September 2	8:00 p.m.	Abilene Christian	**New Mexico**	Dreamstyle Stadium • Albuquerque, NM		**W** 38–14	21,475	
September 2	8:30 p.m.	UC Davis	**San Diego State**	Qualcomm Stadium • San Diego, CA	Stadium	**W** 38–17	46,132	
September 2	9:00 p.m.	Howard	**UNLV**	Sam Boyd Stadium • Paradise, NV	Stadium	**L** 40–43	15,667	
September 2	10:00 p.m.	Incarnate Word	**Fresno State**	Bulldog Stadium • Fresno, CA		**W** 66–0	39,447	
September 3	12:00 a.m.	Western Carolina	**Hawaii**	Aloha Stadium • Honolulu, HI	SPEC PPV	**W** 41–18	25,472	
^{#}Rankings from AP Poll released prior to game. All times are in Mountain Time.

==== Week Two ====
Date	Time	Visiting team	Home team	Site	TV	Result	Attendance	Ref.
September 7	6:00 p.m.	Idaho State	**Utah State**	Maverik Stadium • Logan, UT	Stadium on Facebook	**W** 51–13	19,638	
September 9	1:30 p.m.	Abilene Christian	**Colorado State**	Colorado State Stadium • Fort Collins, CO	MWN	**W** 31–10	27,038	
September 9	12:30 p.m.	**Fresno State**	No. 1 Alabama	Bryant–Denny Stadium • Tuscaloosa, AL	ESPN2	**L** 10–41	101,127	
September 9	1:30 p.m.	**San Jose State**	Texas	Darrell K Royal–Texas Memorial Stadium • Austin, TX	LHN	**L** 0–56	88,117	
September 9	2:00 p.m.	Gardner–Webb	**Wyoming**	War Memorial Stadium • Laramie, WY	ATTSNRM	**W** 21–0	19,051	
September 9	3:00 p.m.	**Hawaii**	UCLA	Rose Bowl • Pasadena, CA	P12N	**L** 23–56	50,444	
September 9	4:00 p.m.	**UNLV**	Idaho	Kibbie Dome • Moscow, ID	ESPN3	**W** 44–16	10,156	
September 9	4:00 p.m.	Toledo	**Nevada**	Mackay Stadium • Reno, NV	ESPN3	**L** 24–37	18,617	
September 9	6:00 p.m.	New Mexico State	**New Mexico**	Dreamstyle Stadium • Albuquerque, NM (Rio Grande Rivalry)	Stadium	**L** 28–30	32,427	
September 9	8:30 p.m.	**Boise State**	No. 22 Washington State	Martin Stadium • Pullman, WA	ESPN	**L** 44–47 ^{3OT}	32,631	
September 9	9:00 p.m.	**San Diego State**	Arizona State	Sun Devil Stadium • Tucson, AZ	P12N	**W** 30–20	54,336	
^{#}Rankings from AP Poll released prior to game. All times are in Mountain Time.

==== Week Three ====
Date	Time	Visiting team	Home team	Site	TV	Result	Attendance	Ref.
September 14	6:00 p.m.	**New Mexico**	**Boise State**	Albertsons Stadium • Boise, ID	ESPN	**BSU** 28–14	28,385	
September 16	10:00 a.m.	**Air Force**	No. 7 Michigan	Michigan Stadium • Ann Arbor, MI	BTN	**L** 13–29	111,387	
September 16	1:00 p.m.	**Utah State**	Wake Forest	BB&T Field • Winston-Salem, NC	ACCN	**L** 10–46	27,971	
September 16	5:00 p.m.	Idaho State	**Nevada**	Mackay Stadium • Reno, NV	ATTSNRM/Stadium	**L** 28–30	16,394	
September 16	5:00 p.m.	Oregon	**Wyoming**	War Memorial Stadium • Laramie, WY	CBSSN	**L** 13–49	29,139	
September 16	5:00 p.m.	**Colorado State**	No. 1 Alabama	Bryant–Denny Stadium • Tuscaloosa, AL	ESPN2	**L** 23–41	101,821	
September 16	7:30 p.m.	**Fresno State**	No. 6 Washington	Husky Stadium • Seattle, WA	P12N	**L** 16–48	68,384	
September 16	8:00 p.m.	**San Jose State**	Utah	Rice-Eccles Stadium • Salt Lake City, UT	ESPN2	**L** 16–54	45,881	
September 16	8:30 p.m.	No. 19 Stanford	**San Diego State**	Qualcomm Stadium • San Diego, CA	CBSSN	**W** 20–17	43,040	
^{#}Rankings from AP Poll released prior to game. All times are in Mountain Time.

==== Week Four ====
Date	Time	Visiting team	Home team	Site	TV	Result	Attendance	Ref.
September 22	6:00 p.m.	Virginia	**Boise State**	Albertsons Stadium • Boise, ID	ESPN2	**L** 23–42	33,947	
September 23	10:00 a.m.	**UNLV**	No. 10 Ohio State	Ohio Stadium • Columbus, OH	BTN	**L** 21–54	106,187	
September 23	11:30 a.m.	**New Mexico**	Tulsa	H. A. Chapman Stadium • Tulsa	ESPN3	**W** 16–13	18,026	
September 23	4:00 p.m.	**Nevada**	No. 18 Washington State	Martin Stadium • Pullman, WA	P12N	**L** 7–45	30,317	
September 23	5:00 p.m.	No. 22 **San Diego State**	**Air Force**	Falcon Stadium • Colorado Springs, CO	CBSSN	**SDSU** 28–24	27,575	
September 23	5:30 p.m.	**Utah State**	**San Jose State**	CEFCU Stadium • San Jose, CA	Stadium	**USU** 61–10	12,426	
September 23	8:15 p.m.	**Hawaii**	**Wyoming**	War Memorial Stadium • Laramie, WY (Paniolo Trophy)	ESPN2	**Wyo** 28–21 ^{OT}	17,796	
^{#}Rankings from AP Poll released prior to game. All times are in Mountain Time.

==== Week Five ====
Date	Time	Visiting team	Home team	Site	TV	Result	Attendance	Ref.
September 29	6:00 p.m.	BYU	**Utah State**	Maverik Stadium • Logan, UT (The Old Wagon Wheel)	CBSSN	**W** 40–24	24,112	
September 30	2:00 p.m.	Texas State	**Wyoming**	War Memorial Stadium • Laramie, WY	Stadium	**W** 45–10	21,784	
September 30	5:00 p.m.	**Air Force**	**New Mexico**	Dreamstyle Stadium • Albuquerque, NM		**NM** 56–38	21,864	
September 30	8:00 p.m.	**Nevada**	**Fresno State**	Bulldog Stadium • Fresno, CA	AT&TSN	**FSU** 41–21	27,434	
September 30	8:30 p.m.	**San Jose State**	**UNLV**	Sam Boyd Stadium • Whitney, NV	ESPNU	**UNLV** 41–13	15,009	
September 30	8:30 p.m.	Northern Illinois	No. 19 **San Diego State**	SDCCU Stadium • San Diego, CA	CBSSN	**W** 34–28	35,717	
September 30	12:00 a.m.	**Colorado State**	**Hawaii**	Aloha Stadium • Honolulu, HI	SPEC PPV	**CSU** 51–21	25,687	
^{#}Rankings from AP Poll released prior to game. All times are in Mountain Time.

==== Week Six ====
Date	Time	Visiting team	Home team	Site	TV	Result	Attendance	Ref.
October 6	8:15 p.m.	**Boise State**	BYU	LaVell Edwards Stadium • Provo, UT	ESPN	**W** 24–7	59,753	
October 7	1:30 p.m.	**Air Force**	Navy	Navy–Marine Corps Memorial Stadium • Annapolis, MD (Commander-in-Chief's Trophy)	CBSSN	**L** 45–48	38,792	
October 7	2:30 p.m.	**Colorado State**	**Utah State**	Maverik Stadium • Logan, UT	ATTSNRM	**CSU** 27–14	18,004	
October 7	5:30 p.m.	**Fresno State**	**San Jose State**	CEFCU Stadium • San Jose, CA (Valley Trophy)	ESPN3	**FSU** 27–10	18,483	
October 7	8:45 p.m.	No. 19 **San Diego State**	**UNLV**	Sam Boyd Stadium • Whitney, NV	ESPN2	**SDSU** 41–10	19,770	
October 7	8:30 p.m.	**Hawaii**	**Nevada**	Mackay Stadium • Reno, NV	CBSSN	**Nev** 35–21	16,566	
^{#}Rankings from AP Poll released prior to game. All times are in Mountain Time.

==== Week Seven ====
Date	Time	Visiting team	Home team	Site	TV	Result	Attendance	Ref.
October 14	12:00 p.m.	UNLV	**Air Force**	Falcon Stadium • Colorado Springs, CO	ATTSNRM	**AFA** 34–30	26,679	
October 14	2:30 p.m.	Wyoming	**Utah State**	Maverik Stadium • Logan, UT (Bridger's Battle)	Stadium	**Wyo** 28–23	22,234	
October 14	8:00 p.m.	New Mexico	**Fresno State**	Bulldog Stadium • Fresno, CA	AT&TSN	**FSU** 38–0	28,090	
October 14	8:15 p.m.	Nevada	**Colorado State**	Colorado State Stadium • Fort Collins, CO	ESPN2	**CSU** 42–40	36,765	
October 14	8:30 p.m.	Boise State	No. 19 **San Diego State**	SDCCU Stadium • San Diego, CA	CBSSN	**BSU** 31–14	49,053	
October 14	12:00 a.m.	San Jose State	**Hawaii**	Aloha Stadium • Honolulu, HI	SPEC PPV	**Haw** 37–26	25,019	
^{#}Rankings from AP Poll released prior to game. All times are in Mountain Time.

==== Week Eight ====
Date	Time	Visiting team	Home team	Site	TV	Result	Attendance	Ref.
October 20	7:30 p.m.	**Air Force**	**Nevada**	Mackay Stadium • Reno, NV	CBSSN	**AFA** 45–42	16,789	
October 20	8:15 p.m.	**Colorado State**	**New Mexico**	Dreamstyle Stadium • Albuquerque, NM	ESPN2	**CSU** 27–24	17,358	
October 21	4:00 p.m.	**Utah State**	**UNLV**	Sam Boyd Stadium • Whitney, NV	ATTSNRM/Stadium	**USU** 52–28	18,157	
October 21	8:15 p.m.	**Wyoming**	**Boise State**	Albertsons Stadium • Boise, ID	ESPN2	**BSU** 24–14	35,565	
October 21	8:30 p.m.	**Fresno State**	**San Diego State**	SDCCU Stadium • San Diego, CA (Battle for the Oil Can)	CBSSN	**FSU** 27–3	43,243	
^{#}Rankings from AP Poll released prior to game. All times are in Mountain Time.

==== Week Nine ====
Date	Time	Visiting team	Home team	Site	TV	Result	Attendance	Ref.
October 28	1:00 p.m.	**Air Force**	Colorado State	Colorado State Stadium • Fort Collins, CO (Ram–Falcon Trophy)	CBSSN	**AFA** 45–28	33,074	
October 28	1:00 p.m.	**San Jose State**	BYU	LaVell Edwards Stadium • Provo, UT	BYUtv/ESPN3	**L** 20–41	46,451	
October 28	5:30 p.m.	New Mexico	**Wyoming**	War Memorial Stadium • Laramie, WY	ESPNU	**Wyo** 42–3	18,249	
October 28	8:00 p.m.	**UNLV**	Fresno State	Bulldog Stadium • Fresno, CA	AT&TSN	**UNLV** 26–16	27,922	
October 28	8:00 p.m.	**Boise State**	Utah State	Maverik Stadium • Logan, UT	CBSSN	**BSU** 41–14	19,012	
October 28	10:15 p.m.	**San Diego State**	Hawaii	Aloha Stadium • Honolulu, HI	ESPN2	**SDSU** 28–7	23,018	
^{#}Rankings from AP Poll released prior to game. All times are in Mountain Time.

==== Week Ten ====
Date	Time	Visiting team	Home team	Site	TV	Result	Attendance	Ref.
November 4	1:30 p.m.	Army	**Air Force**	Falcon Stadium • Colorado Springs, CO (Commander-in-Chief's Trophy)	CBSSN	**L** 0–21	41,875	
November 4	3:30 p.m.	**Utah State**	New Mexico	Dreamstyle Stadium • Albuquerque, NM	ATTSNRM	**USU** 24–10	19,293	
November 4	4:00 p.m.	Hawaii	**UNLV**	Sam Boyd Stadium • Whitney, NV	Spectrum OC16	**UNLV** 31–23	16,278	
November 4	5:00 p.m.	Colorado State	**Wyoming**	War Memorial Stadium • Laramie, WY (Border War)	CBSSN	**Wyo** 16–13	22,840	
November 4	5:00 p.m.	Nevada	**Boise State**	Albertsons Stadium • Boise, ID (BSU-NEV Rivalry)	ESPNU	**BSU** 41–14	30,858	
November 4	8:30 p.m.	**San Diego State**	San Jose State	CEFCU Stadium • San Jose, CA (El Camino Real Rivalry)	ESPNU	**SDSU** 52–7	17,629	
November 4	8:45 p.m.	BYU	**Fresno State**	Bulldog Stadium • Fresno, CA	ESPN2	**W** 20–13	29,370	
^{#}Rankings from AP Poll released prior to game. All times are in Mountain Time.

==== Week Eleven ====
Date	Time	Visiting team	Home team	Site	TV	Result	Attendance	Ref.
November 10	8:30 p.m.	**BYU**	UNLV	Sam Boyd Stadium • Whitney, NV	ESPN2	**L** 21–31	19,811	
November 11	2:00 p.m.	San Jose State	**Nevada**	Mackay Stadium • Reno, NV	ESPN3	**Nev** 59–14	14,604	
November 11	5:00 p.m.	New Mexico	**Texas A&M**	Kyle Field • College Station, TX	ESPNU	**L** 14–55	99,051	
November 11	8:15 p.m.	**Wyoming**	Air Force	Falcon Stadium • Colorado Springs, CO	ESPNU	**Wyo** 28–14	24,257	
November 11	8:30 p.m.	**Boise State**	Colorado State	Colorado State Stadium • Fort Collins, CO	CBSSN	**BSU** 59–52 ^{OT}	32,166	
November 11	12:00 a.m.	**Fresno State**	Hawaii	Aloha Stadium • Honolulu, HI (Golden Screwdriver)	SPEC PPV	**FSU** 31–21	21,357	
^{#}Rankings from AP Poll released prior to game. All times are in Mountain Time.

==== Week Twelve ====
Date	Time	Visiting team	Home team	Site	TV	Result	Attendance	Ref.
November 17	7:30 p.m.	**UNLV**	New Mexico	Dreamstyle Stadium • Albuquerque, NM	ESPN2	**UNLV** 38–35	14,744	
November 18	8:15 p.m.	Air Force	**Boise State**	Albertsons Stadium • Boise, ID	ESPN2	**BSU** 44–19	33,030	
November 18	12:00 p.m.	**Fresno State**	Wyoming	War Memorial Stadium • Laramie, WY	AT&TSN/ROOT Sports	**FSU** 13–7	15,440	
November 18	1:00 p.m.	Hawaii	**Utah State**	Romney Stadium • Logan, UT	CBSSN	**USU** 38–0	17,650	
November 18	1:30 p.m.	San Jose State	**Colorado State**	Colorado State Stadium • Fort Collins, CO	CBSSN	**CSU** 42–14	25,743	
November 18	8:30 p.m.	Nevada	**San Diego State**	SDCCU Stadium • San Diego, CA	CBSSN	**SDSU** 42–23	29,265	
^{#}Rankings from AP Poll released prior to game. All times are in Mountain Time.

==== Week Thirteen ====
Date	Time	Visiting team	Home team	Site	TV	Result	Attendance	Ref.
November 24	1:30 p.m.	New Mexico	**San Diego State**	SDCCU Stadium • San Diego, CA	CBSSN	**SDSU** 35–10	28,978	
November 25	1:30 p.m.	No. 25 Boise State	**Fresno State**	Bulldog Stadium • Fresno, CA (Milk Can)	CBSSN	**FSU** 28–17	31,526	
November 25	1:00 p.m.	UNLV	**Nevada**	Mackay Stadium • Reno, NV (Fremont Cannon)	AT&TSN	**Nev** 23–16	17,359	
November 25	3:00 p.m.	Wyoming	**San Jose State**	CEFCU Stadium • San Jose, CA	ESPN3	**SJSU** 20–17	12,653	
November 25	7:00 p.m.	**BYU**	Hawaii	Aloha Stadium • Honolulu, HI	CBSSN	**L** 20–30	24,910	
November 25	8:15 p.m.	Utah State	**Air Force**	Falcon Stadium • Usaf Academy, CO	ESPN2	**AFA** 38–35	17,252	
^{#}Rankings from AP Poll released prior to game. All times are in Mountain Time.

=== Championship Game ===
==== Week Fourteen (Mountain West Championship game) ====
The 2017 Mountain West Championship Game was held on December 2 between the champions of the Mountain Division, Boise State and the West Division, Fresno State. Boise State beat Fresno State 17–10.

== Records against FBS conferences ==
Conference	Record
The American	1–2
ACC	0–2
Big Ten	0–5
Big 12	0–1
C-USA	0–0
Independents	4–4
MAC	1–1
Pac-12	3–7
SEC	0–3
Sun Belt	3–1
Total	12–26

=== Power Five conferences and independents ===
Power 5 Conferences	Record
ACC	0–2
Big Ten	0–5
Big 12	0–1
Pac-12	3–7
SEC	0–3
Notre Dame	0–0
Power 5 Total	3–18

=== Group of Five conferences ===
Group of 5 Conferences	Record
American	1–2
C-USA	0–0
MAC	1–1
Independents (excluding Notre Dame)	4–4
Sun Belt	3–1
Group of 5 Total	9–8

=== FCS Subdivision ===
FCS Opponents	Record
Football Championship Subdivision	9–2
Total FCS Record	9–2

=== Postseason ===
Power 5 Conferences	Record
ACC	0–0
Big Ten	0–0
Big 12	0–0
Pac-12	1–0
Notre Dame	0–0
SEC	0–0
Power 5 Total	1–0
Other FBS Conferences	Record
American	1–0
C–USA	0–1
Independents (excluding Notre Dame)	0–1
MAC	1–0
Sun Belt	0–1
Total Bowl Record	3–3

== Postseason ==
=== Bowl games ===
Legend
Mountain West win
Mountain West loss

Bowl game	Date	Site	Television	Time (EST)	Mountain West team	Opponent	Score	Attendance
Las Vegas Bowl	December 16	Sam Boyd Stadium • Las Vegas, NV	ABC	3:30 p.m.	#25 Boise State Broncos (10–3)	Oregon Ducks (7–5)	38–28	36,432
New Mexico Bowl	December 16	Dreamstyle Stadium • Albuquerque, NM	ESPN	4:30 p.m.	Colorado State Rams (7–5)	Marshall Thundering Herd (7–5)	28–31	26,087
Famous Idaho Potato Bowl	December 22	Albertsons Stadium • Boise, ID	ESPN	4:00 p.m.	Wyoming Cowboys (7–5)	Central Michigan Chippewas (8–4)	37–14	16,512
Armed Forces Bowl	December 23	Amon G. Carter Stadium • Fort Worth, TX	ESPN	3:30 p.m.	San Diego State Aztecs (10–2)	Army Black Knights (8–3)	35–42	35,986
Hawaii Bowl	December 24	Aloha Stadium • Honolulu, HI	ESPN	8:30 p.m.	Fresno State Bulldogs (9–4)	Houston Cougars (7–4)	33–27	20,546
Arizona Bowl	December 29	Arizona Stadium • Tucson, AZ	CBSSN	5:30 p.m.	Utah State Aggies (6–6)	New Mexico State Aggies (6–6)	20–26	39,132

Boise State's ranking is from the CFP Poll.

Selection of teams: Boise State, Colorado State, Fresno State, San Diego State, Utah State, & Wyoming (6)

== Awards and honors ==
=== All-Conference teams ===
- Offensive Player of the Year: Rashaad Penny, Sr., RB, San Diego State
- Defensive Player of the Year: Leighton Vander Esch, Jr., LB, Boise State
- Special Teams Player of the Year: Rashaad Penny, Sr., KR/PR, San Diego State
- Freshman of the Year: Armani Rogers, QB, UNLV
- Coach of the Year: Jeff Tedford, Fresno State

Offense:

Pos.	Name	Yr.	School	Pos.	Name	Yr.	School
First Team				Second Team			
QB	Nick Stevens	Sr.	Colorado State	QB	Brett Rypien	Jr.	Boise State
WR	Cedrick Wilson Jr.	Sr.	Boise State	WR	KeeSean Johnson	Jr.	Fresno State
WR	Michael Gallup*	Sr.	Colorado State	WR	Wyatt Demps	Sr.	Nevada
RB	Rashaad Penny	Sr.	San Diego State	RB	Dalyn Dawkins	Sr.	Colorado State
RB	Lexington Thomas	Jr.	UNLV	RB	Diocemy Saint Juste	Sr.	Hawaii
TE	Jake Roh	Sr.	Boise State	TE	David Wells*	Sr.	San Diego State
OL	Mason Hampton	Sr.	Boise State	OL	Alex Norton	Sr.	Air Force
OL	Jake Bennett	Sr.	Colorado State	OL	Archie Lewis	Sr.	Boise State
OL	Zack Golditch	Sr.	Colorado State	OL	Aaron Mitchell	Sr.	Fresno State
OL	Dejon Allen	Sr.	Hawaii	OL	Keith Ismael	Fr.	San Diego State
OL	Austin Corbett	Sr.	Nevada	OL	Tyler Roemer	Fr.	San Diego State
PK	Dominik Eberle	So.	Utah State	PK	Jimmy Camacho	Sr.	Fresno State
PR/KR	Rashaad Penny**	Sr.	San Diego State	PR/KR	Avery Williams	Fr.	Boise State

(* – Two-Time First-Team Selection)
(** – Three-Time First-Team Selection)

Defense:

Pos.	Name	Yr.	School	Pos.	Name	Yr.	School
First Team				Second Team			
DL	Curtis Weaver	Fr.	Boise State	DL	Jabril Frazier	Jr.	Boise State
DL	Malik Reed	Jr.	Nevada	DL	David Moa	Jr.	Boise State
DL	Youhanna Ghaifan	So.	Wyoming	DL	Tobenna Okeke	Sr.	Fresno State
DL	Carl Granderson	Jr.	Wyoming	DL	Mike Hughes Jr.	Sr.	UNLV
LB	Leighton Vander Esch	Jr.	Boise State	LB	Jahlani Tavai	Jr.	Hawaii
LB	Jeffrey Allison	So.	Fresno State	LB	Ronley Lakalaka	Jr.	San Diego State
LB	Frank Ginda	Jr.	San Jose State	LB	Logan Wilson	So.	Wyoming
DB	Tyler Horton	Jr.	Boise State	DB	Kekoa Nawahine	So.	Boise State
DB	Kameron Kelly	Sr.	San Diego State	DB	Dameon Barber	Jr.	Nevada
DB	Jalen Davis	Sr.	Utah State	DB	Tariq Thompson	Fr.	San Diego State
DB	Andrew Wingard*	Jr.	Wyoming	DB	Rico Gafford	Sr.	Wyoming
P	Corey Bojorquez	Sr.	New Mexico	P	Michael Carrizosa	Sr.	San Jose State

(* – Two-Time Second-Team Selection)

Honorable Mentions:

- Air Force: Grant Ross, Sr., LB.
- Boise State: Ezra Cleveland, Fr., OL; Haden Hoggarth, Jr., PK; Alexander Mattison, So., RB; Tyson Maeva, So., LB; Durrant Miles, Jr., DL; John Molchon, So., OL; DeAndre Pierce, So., DB.
- Colorado State: Evan Colorito, Sr., LB; Dalton Fackrell, Sr., TE; Trae Moxley, Sr., OL; Ryan Stonehouse, Fr., P; Josh Watson, Jr., LB.
- Fresno State: Mike Bell, So., DB; Jaron Bryant, So., DB; Christian Cronk, Jr., OL; Malik Forrester, Sr., DL; George Helmuth, Jr., LB; Juju Hughes, So., DB; Marcus McMaryion, Jr., QB; Netane Muti, Fr., OL; David Patterson, Sr., OL; Micah St. Andrew, Jr., OL; Robert Stanley, Sr., DL.
- Hawai'i: Meffy Koloamatangi, Sr., DL; Viane Moala, So., DL.
- Nevada: Ty Gangi, Jr., QB; Sean Krepsz, Jr., OL; Austin Paulhus, Sr., LB; Asauni Rufus, Jr., DB.
- New Mexico: Blaise Fountain, Sr., OL; Garrett Hughes, Sr., DL; Aaron Jenkins, Jr., OL; Jake Rothschiller, Sr., DB.
- San Diego State: Parker Baldwin, Jr., DB; Mikah Holder, Sr., WR.
- San Jose State: Bryce Crawford, Jr., PK; Chris Gonzalez, Sr., OL.
- UNLV: Nathan Jacobson, Jr., OL; Kyle Saxelid, Sr., OL.
- Utah State: Roman Andrus, Jr., OL; Quin Ficklin, Jr., OL; Dallin Leavitt, Sr., DB; Dax Raymond, So., TE.
- Wyoming: Josh Allen, Sr., QB; Tyler Hall, So., RET.

== Home game attendance ==
Team	Stadium	Capacity	Game 1	Game 2	Game 3	Game 4	Game 5	Game 6	Game 7	Total	Average	% of Capacity
Air Force	Falcon Stadium	46,692	37,286	27,575	26,679	41,875†	24,257	17,252	—	174,924	29,154	62.4%
Boise State	Albertsons Stadium	36,387	31,581	28,385	33,947	35,565†	30,858	33,030	—	193,366	32,228	88.6%
Colorado State	Colorado State Stadium	41,200	37,583†	27,038	36,765	33,074	32,166	25,743	—	192,369	32,062	77.8%
Fresno State	Bulldog Stadium	41,031	39,447†	27,434	28,090	27,922	29,370	31,526	—	183,789	30,632	74.7%
Hawaiʻi	Aloha Stadium	50,000	25,472	25,687†	25,019	23,018	21,357	24,910	—	145,463	24,244	48.5%
Nevada	Mackay Stadium	30,000	18,617†	16,394	16,566	16,789	14,604	17,359	—	100,329	16,722	55.7%
New Mexico	Dreamstyle Stadium	39,224	21,475	32,427†	21,864	17,358	19,293	14,744	—	127,161	21,194	54.0%
San Diego State	SDCCU Stadium	54,000	46,132	43,040	35,717	49,053†	43,243	29,265	28,978	275,428	39,347	72.9%
San José State	CEFCU Stadium	30,456	13,377	10,667	12,426	18,483†	17,629	12,653	—	82,235	14,206	46.6%
Utah State	Maverik Stadium	25,513	19,638	24,112†	18,004	22,234	19,012	17,650	—	120,650	20,108	78.8%
UNLV	Sam Boyd Stadium	35,500	15,667	15,009	19,770	18,157	16,278	19,811†	—	104,692	17,449	49.2%
Wyoming	War Memorial Stadium	29,181	19,051	29,139†	17,796	21,784	18,249	22,840	15,440	144,299	20,614	70.6%

Bold – Exceed capacity
†Season High
