= Marcus McMaryion =

American football quarterback (born 1996)

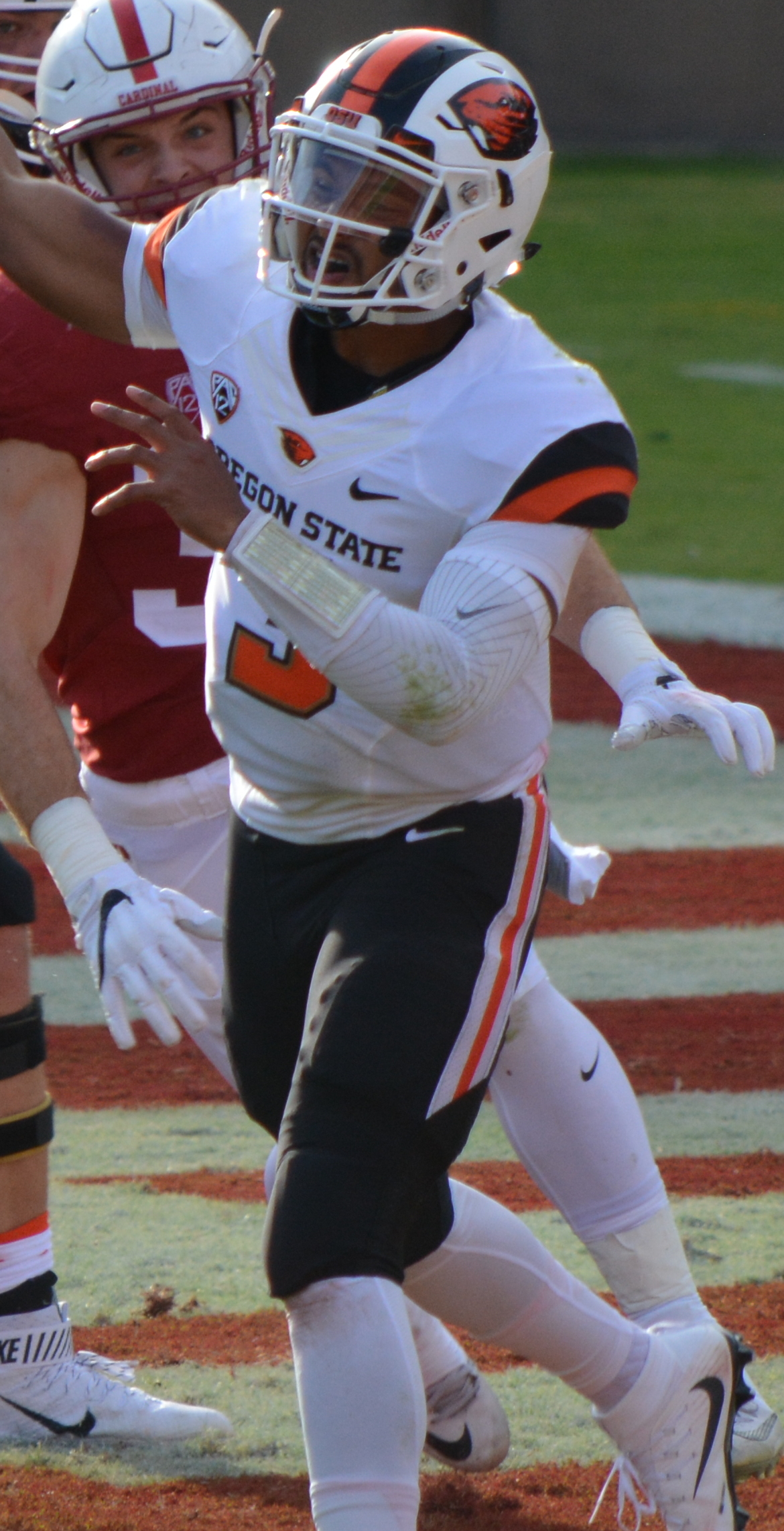
- McMaryion with Oregon State in 2016

Profile
- Position: Quarterback

Personal information
- Born: May 30, 1996 (age 30); Fresno, California, U.S.
- Listed height: 6 ft 2 in (1.88 m)
- Listed weight: 203 lb (92 kg)

Career information
- High school: Dinuba (Dinuba, California)
- College: Oregon State (2014–2016); Fresno State (2017–2018)
- NFL draft: 2019: undrafted

Career history
- Calgary Stampeders (2020)*
- * Offseason or practice squad member only

Marcus McMaryion (born May 30, 1996) is an American former football quarterback. He played college football for the Oregon State Beavers and Fresno State Bulldogs.

== Early life ==
McMaryion attended Dinuba High School in Dinuba, California. As a senior, he threw for 2,659 yards with 28 touchdowns and nine interceptions. Following the conclusion of his high school career, McMaryion committed to play college football at Oregon State University.

== College career ==
In his first year on campus in 2014, McMaryion redshirted. Entering the 2015 season, he competed with fellow freshmen Seth Collins and Nick Mitchell for the Beavers' starting quarterback job. In his first significant playing time against Washington, he completed eight passes for 109 yards and one touchdown, while throwing one interception. Following the game against Washington, he was named the starting quarterback for the Beavers' rivalry matchup against Oregon. In his first career start, McMaryion completed 11 passes for 154 yards and an interception in a 52–42 loss. Entering the 2016 season, he competed with Darell Garretson and Conor Blount, eventually being named the third string. Following injuries to both Garretson and Blount, McMaryion was thrust into the starting role. In a game against Arizona, he threw for 265 yards and five touchdowns leading the Beavers to a 42–17 victory. McMaryion finished the 2016 season recording 1,286 passing yards, ten touchdowns, and five interceptions. After losing the starting job to transfer Jake Luton prior to the start of the 2017 season, McMaryion announced his decision to transfer.

On August 8, 2017, McMaryion announced his decision to transfer to California State University, Fresno to play for the Fresno State Bulldogs. He began the season as the backup but was eventually named the starter prior to the conference opener against Nevada. In his first start for the Bulldogs, McMaryion threw for 296 yards, two touchdowns, and an interception. In the 2017 Hawaii Bowl against Houston, he completed 33 passes for a then career-high 342 yards, leading the team to a 33–27 triumph and being named the game's MVP. McMaryion ended the season totaling 2,726 passing yards, 14 touchdowns, and five interceptions. Entering his senior season, he was named to the Johnny Unitas Golden Arm Award watch list. In a game against UCLA, McMaryion accounted for all five of his team's touchdowns, completing passes for 270 yards and one touchdown and adding four rushing touchdowns. In the Mountain West Championship Game against Boise State, he passed for 170 yards and a touchdown, helping Fresno State secure the conference title. McMaryion finished his final season tallying 3,629 yards passing, 25 touchdowns, and five interceptions while also rushing for 294 yards and eight touchdowns. Following the conclusion of the 2018 season, he participated in the 2019 East–West Shrine Game.

=== Statistics ===
College statistics
Season	Team	Games			Passing								Rushing			
Season	Team	GP	GS	Record	Cmp	Att	Pct	Yds	Avg	TD	Int	Rtg	Att	Yds	Avg	TD
2014	Oregon State	Redshirted (redshirt)														
2015	Oregon State	7	1	0–1	27	67	40.3	403	6.0	1	3	86.8	16	18	1.1	1
2016	Oregon State	8	6	2–4	101	170	59.4	1,286	7.6	10	5	136.5	29	75	2.6	1
2017	Fresno State	14	11	9–2	218	351	62.1	2,726	7.8	14	5	137.7	57	302	5.3	4
2018	Fresno State	14	14	12–2	293	427	68.6	3,629	8.5	25	5	157.0	71	294	4.1	8
Career		43	32	23−9	639	1,015	63.0	8,044	7.9	50	18	142.2	173	689	4.0	14

== Professional career ==
After going undrafted in the 2019 NFL draft, McMaryion attended rookie mini-camp with the Oakland Raiders and New Orleans Saints. On November 27, 2019, he signed with the Calgary Stampeders of the Canadian Football League (CFL). McMaryion was placed on the retired list on June 11, 2021, after not appearing in a game for the Stampeders following the cancellation of the 2020 CFL season due to the COVID-19 pandemic.
