= 2017 Hawaii Bowl =

- 16th Hawaii Bowl
Fresno State Bulldogs	Houston Cougars
(9–4)	(7–4)
Mountain West	The American
33	27
Head coach: Jeff Tedford	Head coach: Major Applewhite
	1	2	3	4	Total
Fresno State	0	13	7	13	33
Houston	7	3	10	7	27
- Date: December 24, 2017
- Season: 2017
- Stadium: Aloha Stadium
- Location: Honolulu, Hawaii
- MVP: Marcus McMaryion (QB, Fresno State) & Steven Dunbar (WR, Houston)
- Referee: Jason Autrey (Sun Belt)
- Attendance: 20,546
- Payout: US$1,200,000

United States TV coverage
- Network: ESPN/ESPN Radio
- Announcers: TV: Chris Cotter, Rod Gilmore, Shelley Smith; Radio: Kevin Winter, TBD

The 2017 Hawaii Bowl was a post-season American college football bowl game played on December 24, 2017, at Aloha Stadium in Honolulu, Hawaii. The sixteenth edition of the Hawaii Bowl featured the Houston Cougars from the American Athletic Conference against the Fresno State Bulldogs from the Mountain West Conference. The game was one of the 2017–18 bowl games concluding the 2017 FBS football season. Fresno State defeated Houston, 33–27.

== Teams ==
Fresno State entered the game with a 9–4 overall record (7–2 in conference), while Houston entered the game with an overall record of 7–4 (5–3 in conference). This was the first meeting between the schools.

== Game summary ==
=== Scoring summary ===
Scoring summary

Quarter	Time	Drive			Team	Scoring information	Score	
Quarter	Time	Plays	Yards	TOP	Team	Scoring information	FRE	HOU
1st	11:35	4	63	1:33	Houston	Ed Oliver 1-yard touchdown run, Caden Novikoff kick good	0	7
2nd	14:13	11	68	2:34	Fresno State	Marcus McMaryion 1-yard touchdown run, Jimmy Camacho kick good	7	7
2nd	9:45	9	60	3:44	Fresno State	27-yard field goal by Jimmy Camacho	10	7
2nd	7:17	8	69	2:28	Houston	31-yard field goal by Caden Novikoff	10	10
2nd	0:00	10	50	1:11	Fresno State	38-yard field goal by Jimmy Camacho	13	10
3rd	7:57	10	45	4:39	Houston	31-yard field goal by Caden Novikoff	13	13
3rd	4:25	9	75	3:36	Fresno State	Marcus McMaryion 6-yard touchdown run, Jimmy Camacho kick good	20	13
3rd	2:54				Houston	Alexander Myres 94 yard blocked field goal return for touchdown, Caden Novikoff kick good	20	20
4th	13:56	10	81	3:58	Fresno State	26-yard field goal by Jimmy Camacho	23	20
4th	6:00	13	66	5:01	Fresno State	33-yard field goal by Jimmy Camacho	26	20
4th	3:49				Fresno State	Jaron Bryant 44 yard interception return for touchdown, Jimmy Camacho kick good	33	20
4th	0:45	16	76	3:04	Houston	Linell Bonner 2-yard touchdown reception from D'Eriq King, Caden Novikoff kick good	33	27
"TOP" = time of possession. For other American football terms, see Glossary of American football.								

=== Statistics ===
	1	2	3	4	Total
Bulldogs	0	13	7	13	33
Cougars	7	3	10	7	27

Statistics	FRE	HOU
First downs	26	17
Third down efficiency	7–19	9–19
Rushes-yards	131	72
Passing yards	342	269
Passing, Comp-Att-Int	33–49–1	23–43–1
Time of Possession	33:18	26:42

Team	Category	Player	Statistics
Fresno State	Passing	Marcus McMaryion	33/48, 342 yds, 1 INT
Fresno State	Rushing	Josh Hokit	11 car, 64 yds
Fresno State	Receiving	KeeSean Johnson	8 rec, 95 yds
Houston	Passing	D'Eriq King	23/43, 269 yds, 1 TD, 1 INT
Houston	Rushing	D'Eriq King	9 car, 38 yds
Houston	Receiving	Steven Dunbar	10 rec, 197 yds
