= KeeSean Johnson =

American gridiron football player (born 1996)

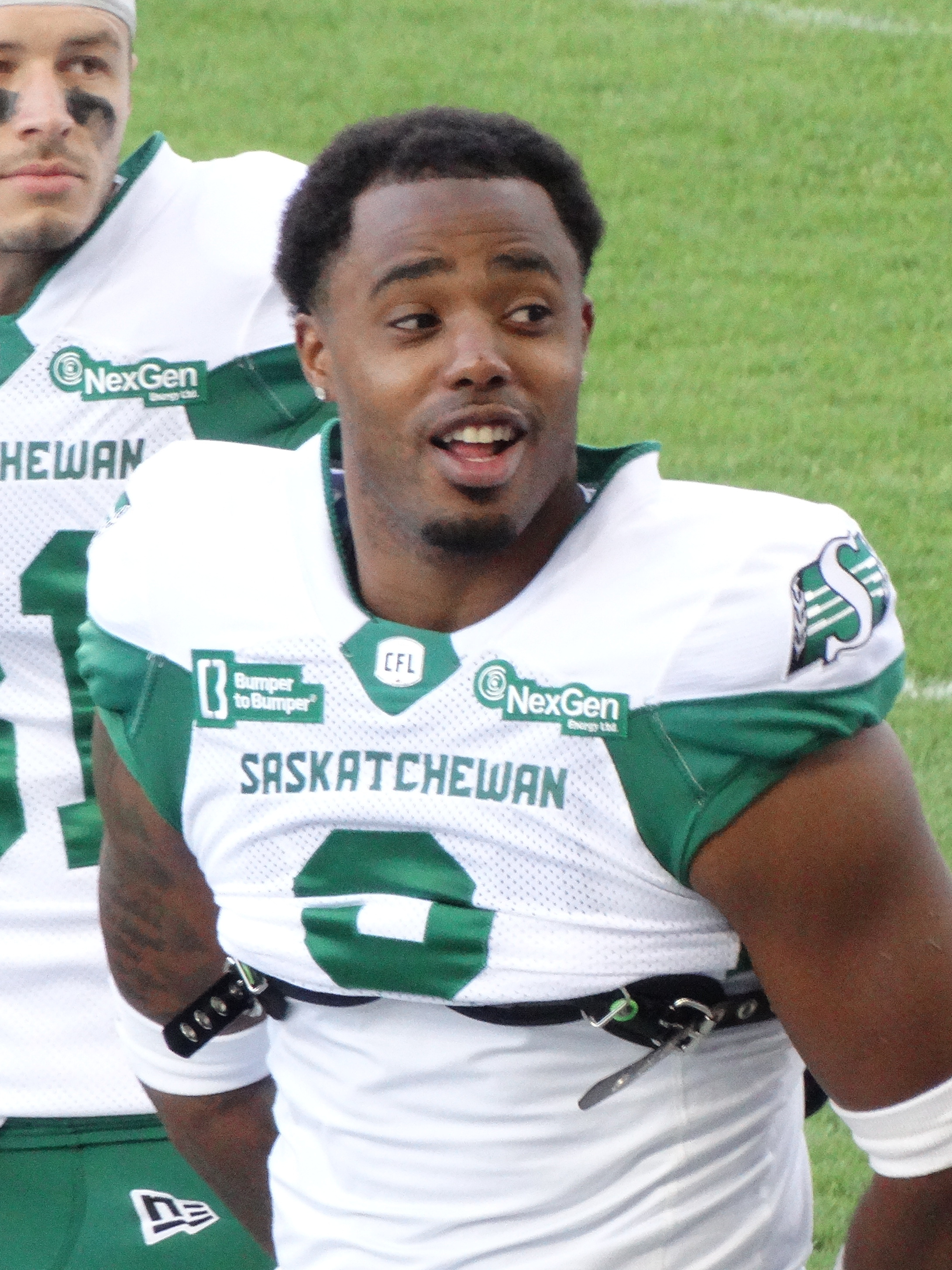
- Johnson with the Saskatchewan Roughriders in 2025

No. 3 – Saskatchewan Roughriders
- Position: Wide receiver
- Roster status: Active

Personal information
- Born: October 9, 1996 (age 30); Mountain View, California, U.S.
- Listed height: 6 ft 1 in (1.85 m)
- Listed weight: 201 lb (91 kg)

Career information
- High school: Palo Alto (Palo Alto, California)
- College: Fresno State (2014–2018)
- NFL draft: 2019: 6th round, 174th overall pick

Career history
- Arizona Cardinals (2019–2020); Philadelphia Eagles (2021); San Francisco 49ers (2022)*; Atlanta Falcons (2022)*; Buffalo Bills (2022–2023)*; Saskatchewan Roughriders (2024–present)
- * Offseason or practice squad member only

Awards and highlights
- Grey Cup champion (2025); CFL All-Star (2025); 2x CFL West All-Star (2025, 2026); 2× Second-team All-MW (2017, 2018); Fresno State career leader in receptions (275) and receiving yards (3,463)

Career NFL statistics
- Receptions: 36
- Receiving yards: 360
- Receiving touchdowns: 1
- Stats at Pro Football Reference
- Stats at CFL.ca

KeeSean Johnson (born October 9, 1996) is an American professional football wide receiver for the Saskatchewan Roughriders of the Canadian Football League (CFL). He played college football at Fresno State and is the program's all-time leader in receiving yards and receptions. Johnson was drafted by the Arizona Cardinals in the sixth round of the 2019 NFL draft.

== Early life ==
Johnson attended and played football at Palo Alto High School, in Palo Alto, California. Johnson played for the same high school as Davante Adams, before they both played for Fresno State University.

== College career ==
Johnson redshirted during his 2014 freshman season and only played one game at Fresno State. In 2015, Johnson started some games. In 2016, as a sophomore, Johnson led the team in receptions, receiving yards, and receiving touchdowns.

During the 2017 season as a junior, Johnson led the team in receptions, receiving yards, and touchdowns for the second-straight season. He caught at least one pass in all 14 games, extending his streak to a program record 36 consecutive games with a catch dating back to 2015, breaking Henry Ellard's record of 34, set from 1979–82. Johnson was named a 2017 All-Mountain West Conference Second-Team selection.

In 2018, as a senior, Johnson led the team in receptions, receiving yards, and touchdowns for the third straight season and became the program's all-time leader in both career receptions, with 275 receptions, and career receiving yards, with 3,463 yards. For the season, Johnson was fourth in the FBS in receiving yards and fifth in receptions; among active players' careers, he ranked second and first, respectively. Johnson also extended his streak of consecutive games with a pass caught to 50. He was named an All-Mountain West Second-Team selection.

=== Statistics ===
Year	Team	Games	Rec	Yards	YPC	TD	Long
2014	Fresno State University	1	0	0	0	0	0
2015	Fresno State University	12	37	337	9.1	2	29
2016	Fresno State University	12	66	773	11.7	6	53
2017	Fresno State University	14	77	1,013	13.2	8	81
2018	Fresno State University	14	95	1,340	14.1	8	45
Total		53	275	3,463	12.0	24	81

== Professional career ==
Pre-draft measurables
Height	Weight	Arm length	Hand span	Wingspan	40-yard dash	10-yard split	20-yard split	20-yard shuttle	Three-cone drill	Vertical jump	Broad jump	Bench press
6 ft 1 1/8 in (1.86 m)	201 lb (91 kg)	32 in (0.81 m)	9 1/2 in (0.24 m)	6 ft 3 3/4 in (1.92 m)	4.53 s	1.59 s	2.63 s	4.23 s	6.81 s	32.5 in (0.83 m)	9 ft 9 in (2.97 m)	14 reps
All values from NFL Combine/Pro Day

=== Arizona Cardinals ===
Johnson was drafted by the Arizona Cardinals in the sixth round (174th overall) of the 2019 NFL draft. He made his NFL debut in the Cardinals' 2019 season opener against the Detroit Lions. In the 27–27 tie, he had five receptions for 46 yards on ten targets. Johnson scored his first NFL touchdown on October 31, 2019, against San Francisco 49ers.

On September 11, 2020, Johnson was placed on the reserve/COVID-19 list, and activated 10 days later.

On August 30, 2021, Johnson was waived by the Cardinals.

=== Philadelphia Eagles ===
On September 2, 2021, Johnson was signed to the practice squad of the Philadelphia Eagles. He was placed on the COVID list on January 1, 2022, and activated four days later.

=== San Francisco 49ers ===
On January 26, 2022, Johnson signed a reserve/future contract with the 49ers. He was waived on August 15, 2022.

=== Atlanta Falcons ===
On August 17, 2022, Johnson signed with the Atlanta Falcons. He was waived on August 30.

=== Buffalo Bills ===
On October 11, 2022, Johnson was signed to the practice squad of the Buffalo Bills. He signed a reserve/future contract on January 23, 2023. He was waived on August 29, 2023.

=== Saskatchewan Roughriders ===
On February 29, 2024, Johnson signed with the Saskatchewan Roughriders of the Canadian Football League.

== Personal life ==
Johnson has confirmed that he was not named after former NFL receiver Keyshawn Johnson, though KeeSean has met Keyshawn before. Coincidentally, both KeeSean and Keyshawn have worn jersey number 19 in the NFL.
