= Austin Corbett =

American football player (born 1995)

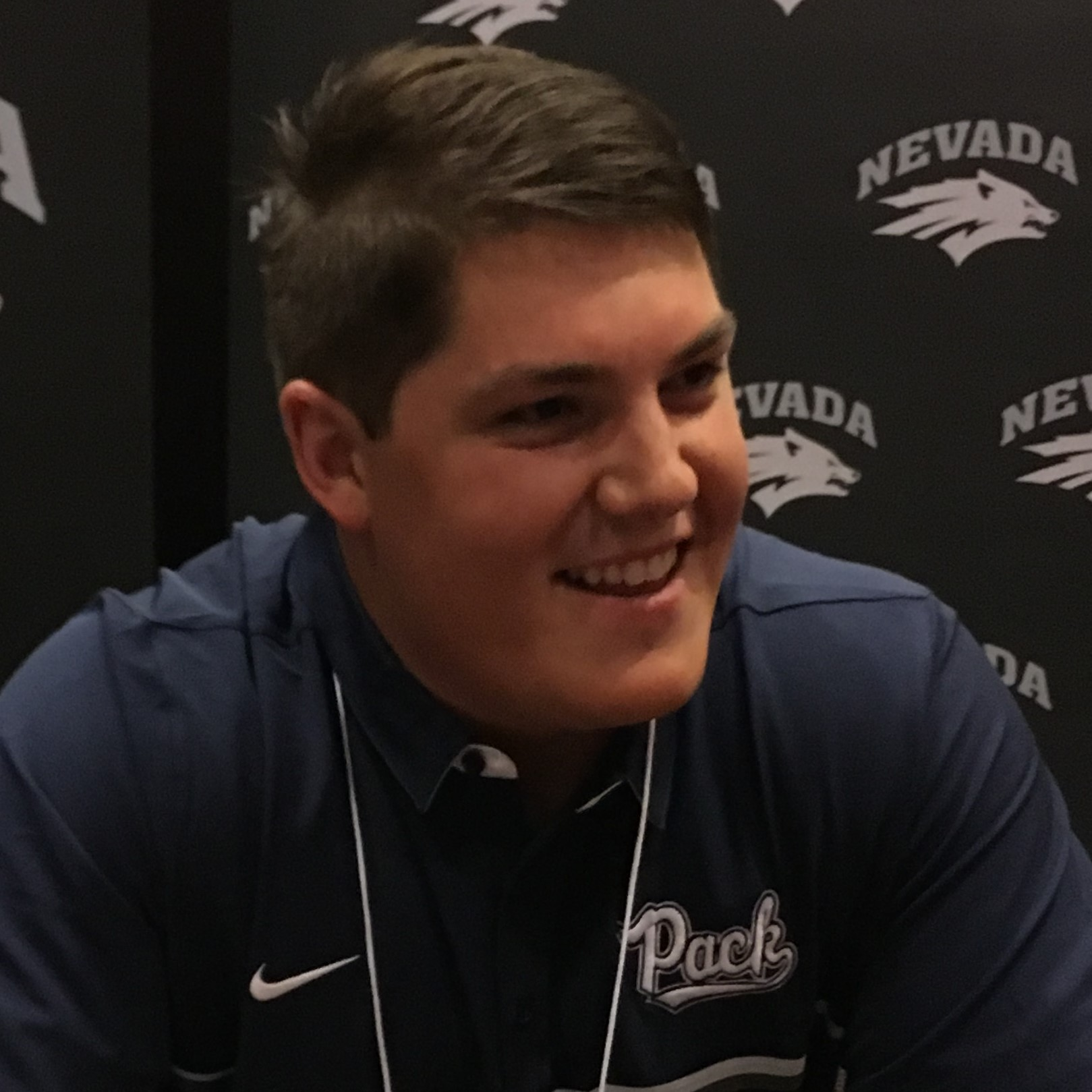
- Corbett at 2017 Mountain West media days

No. 63 – Buffalo Bills
- Position: Center
- Roster status: Active

Personal information
- Born: September 5, 1995 (age 31); Reno, Nevada, U.S.
- Listed height: 6 ft 4 in (1.93 m)
- Listed weight: 306 lb (139 kg)

Career information
- High school: Edward C. Reed (Sparks, Nevada)
- College: Nevada (2013–2017)
- NFL draft: 2018: 2nd round, 33rd overall pick

Career history
- Cleveland Browns (2018–2019); Los Angeles Rams (2019–2021); Carolina Panthers (2022–2025); Buffalo Bills (2026–present)

Awards and highlights
- Super Bowl champion (LVI); First-team All-MW (2017); Second-team All-MW (2016)

Career NFL statistics as of Week 5, 2026
- Games played: 99
- Games started: 78
- Stats at Pro Football Reference

Austin Corbett (born September 5, 1995) is an American professional football center for the Buffalo Bills of the National Football League (NFL). Corbett played for Reed High School in Sparks, Nevada. Starting as a walk on, he played college football for the Nevada Wolf Pack.

== Early life ==
Corbett graduated from Edward C. Reed High School in Sparks, Nevada, where he was a member of two regional championship teams in 2012 and 2013. He was a First team All-Region and All-State in 2012. Besides football, he lettered in wrestling, basketball and track and field, he was even a First team All-State in shot put in 2013. He was a member of the National Honor Society and freshman mentor council.

== College career ==
Before the 2017 season, Corbett had more experience than any other offensive lineman on the Wolf Pack. After the season, he received several team honors including being named the Basalite Big Blocker and a team captain. Overall, Corbett was a 4-year starter at left tackle for Nevada, taking over for his future Cleveland Browns teammate Joel Bitonio as Nevada's starting left tackle as a redshirt freshman.

Following his senior season, Corbett was named as a semifinalist for the 2017 Burlsworth Trophy. He was also invited to the 2018 Senior Bowl.

== Professional career ==
Pre-draft measurables
| Height | Weight | Arm length | Hand span | Wingspan | 40-yard dash | 10-yard split | 20-yard split | 20-yard shuttle | Three-cone drill | Vertical jump | Broad jump | Bench press |
|---|---|---|---|---|---|---|---|---|---|---|---|---|
| 6 ft 4 3/8 in (1.94 m) | 306 lb (139 kg) | 33 1/8 in (0.84 m) | 10 1/2 in (0.27 m) | 6 ft 6 7/8 in (2.00 m) | 5.15 s | 1.76 s | 2.96 s | 4.50 s | 7.87 s | 28 in (0.71 m) | 8 ft 10 in (2.69 m) | 19 reps |
All values from NFL Combine

=== Cleveland Browns ===
The Cleveland Browns selected Austin Corbett in the second round (33rd overall) of the 2018 NFL draft. On May 6, Corbett signed a four-year deal worth $7.568 million featuring a $3.584 million signing bonus.

=== Los Angeles Rams ===
The Browns traded Corbett to the Los Angeles Rams on October 15, 2019, in exchange for the Rams' fifth-round pick in the 2021 NFL draft. In 2019, Corbett started in 7 of 8 games after his trade to the Rams. In 2021–22, Corbett started all 17 regular season games. Corbett also started in every playoff game, including Super Bowl LVI, as the Rams went on to win the game 23–20, playing at home, against the Cincinnati Bengals.

=== Carolina Panthers ===
On March 16, 2022, Corbett signed a three-year, $26.25 million contract with the Carolina Panthers. In the season finale against the New Orleans Saints, he suffered a torn anterior cruciate ligament.

On August 29, 2023, Corbett was placed on the team's reserve/physically unable to perform list which would require him to miss the first four games of the 2023 season. He was activated on October 24. He suffered a season-ending knee injury in Week 11 and was placed on injured reserve on November 22.

Corbett entered the 2024 season as the Panthers starting center. He started the first five games before suffering a torn biceps in Week 5, ending his season.

On March 12, 2025, Corbett re-signed with the Panthers on a one-year contract. In Week 2 against the Arizona Cardinals, Corbett suffered a Grade 3 MCL injury in his left knee; he was placed on injured reserve on September 15. He was activated on October 18, ahead of the team's Week 7 matchup against the New York Jets. He started 11 games at center and both guard spots in 2025.

=== Buffalo Bills ===
On March 26, 2026, Corbett signed with the Buffalo Bills on a one-year contract.

=== Statistics ===
| Year | Team | Games | Starts |
|---|---|---|---|
| 2018 | CLE | 11 | 1 |
| 2019 | CLE | 3 | 0 |
| 2019 | LAR | 8 | 7 |
| 2020 | LAR | 16 | 16 |
| 2021 | LAR | 17 | 17 |
| 2022 | CAR | 17 | 17 |
| 2023 | CAR | 4 | 4 |
| 2024 | CAR | 5 | 5 |
| 2025 | CAR | 13 | 11 |
| 2026 | BUF | 5 | 0 |
| Career | | 99 | 78 |

== Personal life ==
Corbett is a member of the Walker River Paiute Tribe, a federally recognized tribe of Northern Paiute people. He is also a member of the Church of Jesus Christ of Latter-day Saints.
