= Malik Reed =

American football player (born 1996)

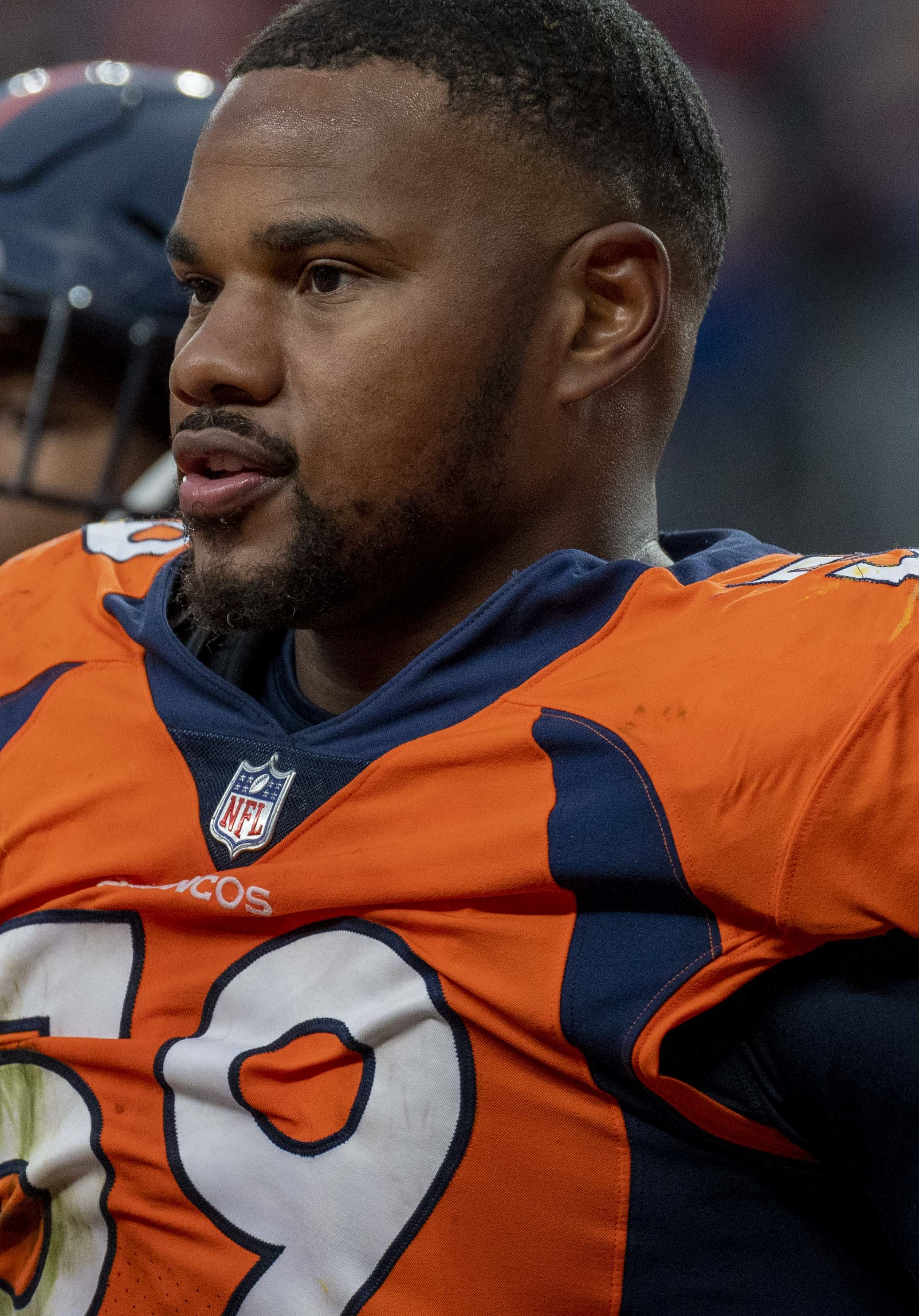
- Reed with the Denver Broncos in 2021

Profile
- Position: Linebacker

Personal information
- Born: August 5, 1996 (age 30); Dothan, Alabama, U.S.
- Listed height: 6 ft 2 in (1.88 m)
- Listed weight: 235 lb (107 kg)

Career information
- High school: Dothan
- College: Nevada (2015-2018)
- NFL draft: 2019: undrafted

Career history
- Denver Broncos (2019–2021); Pittsburgh Steelers (2022); Miami Dolphins (2023)*; Las Vegas Raiders (2023); Miami Dolphins (2023)
- * Offseason or practice squad member only

Awards and highlights
- First-team All-MW (2017); Second-team All-MW (2016)

Career NFL statistics as of 2023
- Total tackles: 151
- Sacks: 16
- Forced fumbles: 3
- Fumble recoveries: 2
- Pass deflections: 6
- Stats at Pro Football Reference

Malik Reed (born August 5, 1996) is an American professional football linebacker. He played college football for the Nevada Wolf Pack and signed with the Denver Broncos as an undrafted free agent in 2019.

== College career ==
Reed played at the University of Nevada, Reno from 2015 to 2018. During his career he had 203 tackles and 22 sacks.

== Professional career ==
Pre-draft measurables
Height	Weight	Arm length	Hand span	40-yard dash	10-yard split	20-yard split	20-yard shuttle	Three-cone drill	Vertical jump	Broad jump	Bench press
6 ft 1 1/4 in (1.86 m)	234 lb (106 kg)	31 1/4 in (0.79 m)	9 3/8 in (0.24 m)	4.85 s	1.63 s	2.83 s	4.35 s	6.89 s	32.5 in (0.83 m)	9 ft 11 in (3.02 m)	19 reps
All values from Pro Day

=== Denver Broncos ===
Reed signed with the Denver Broncos as an undrafted free agent in 2019.

In Week 6 of the 2020 season against the New England Patriots, Reed recorded his first two sacks of the season on Cam Newton during the 18–12 win. In Week 7 against the Kansas City Chiefs, Reed recorded another two sacks, this time on Patrick Mahomes, during the 43–16 loss.

=== Pittsburgh Steelers ===
On August 30, 2022, the Broncos traded Reed to the Pittsburgh Steelers.

=== Miami Dolphins (first stint) ===
On March 20, 2023, Reed signed a one-year contract with the Miami Dolphins. He was released on August 29, 2023.

=== Las Vegas Raiders ===
On September 27, 2023, Reed signed with the practice squad of the Las Vegas Raiders. He was promoted to the active roster on November 4. He was waived on December 21.

=== Miami Dolphins (second stint) ===
On January 10, 2024, Reed was signed to the Dolphins practice squad. He was not signed to a reserve/future contract after the season and thus became a free agent upon the expiration of his practice squad contract.

== Personal life ==
Reed is a Christian. Reed is married to Cidavia Reed.
