= 2017 Fresno State Bulldogs football team =

American college football season

2017 Fresno State Bulldogs football

MW West Division champion Hawaii Bowl champion

MW Championship Game, L 14–17 vs. Boise State

Hawaii Bowl, W 33–27 vs. Houston
- Conference: Mountain West Conference
- West Division
- Record: 10–4 (7–1 MW)
- Head coach: Jeff Tedford (1st season)
- Offensive coordinator: Kalen DeBoer (1st season)
- Offensive scheme: Pro-style
- Defensive coordinator: Orlondo Steinauer (1st season)
- Base defense: 4–3
- Home stadium: Bulldog Stadium

2017 Mountain West Conference football standings
	Conf.			Overall
Team	W		L	W		L
Mountain Division
No. 22 Boise State xy$	7	–	1	11	–	3
Colorado State	5	–	3	7	–	6
Wyoming	5	–	3	8	–	5
Utah State	4	–	4	6	–	7
Air Force	4	–	4	5	–	7
New Mexico	1	–	7	3	–	9
West Division
Fresno State xy	7	–	1	10	–	4
San Diego State	6	–	2	10	–	3
UNLV	4	–	4	5	–	7
Nevada	3	–	5	3	–	9
Hawaii	1	–	7	3	–	9
San Jose State	1	–	7	2	–	11
Championship: Boise State 17, Fresno State 14
$ – Conference champion; x – Division champion/co-champions; y – Championship game participant; Rankings from AP Poll

The 2017 Fresno State Bulldogs football team represented California State University, Fresno in the 2017 NCAA Division I FBS football season. The Bulldogs were led by first-year head coach Jeff Tedford and played their home games at Bulldog Stadium as a member of the Mountain West Conference in the West Division. They finished the season 10–4, 7–1 in Mountain West play to win the West Division. They lost to Mountain Division champion Boise State in the Mountain West Championship Game. They were invited to the Hawaii Bowl where they defeated Houston. They became only the second team in college football history to win ten games the year after they lost ten or more games (1–11 in 2016).

In a twist of irony, Tedford, who was the head coach at California from 2002 to 2011, took over for Tim DeRuyter, who was hired to be the defensive coordinator at California for the 2017 season.

== Personnel ==
=== Position key ===
Back	B	Center	C	Cornerback	CB	Defensive back	DB
Defensive end	DE	Defensive lineman	DL	Defensive tackle	DT	End	E
Fullback	FB	Guard	G	Halfback	HB	Kicker	K
Kickoff returner	KR	Offensive tackle	OT	Offensive lineman	OL	Linebacker	LB
Long snapper	LS	Punter	P	Punt returner	PR	Quarterback	QB
Running back	RB	Safety	S	Tight end	TE	Wide receiver	WR

=== Recruiting class ===
The Bulldogs signed a total of 23 recruits.

College recruiting information (2017)
Name	Hometown	School	Height	Weight	Commit date
Marc-David Bien-Aime; OL	Montreal, Quebec, Canada	Montmorency CC	6 ft 5 in (1.96 m)	365 lb (166 kg)	Jan 22, 2017
Marc-David Bien-Aime; OL	Recruit ratings: Scout: Rivals: 247Sports:				
Matthew Boateng; DB	Ajax, Ontario, Canada	Arizona Western CC	5 ft 11 in (1.80 m)	170 lb (77 kg)	Dec 11, 2016
Matthew Boateng; DB	Recruit ratings: Scout: Rivals: 247Sports:				
Dontae Bull; OL	Victoria, British Columbia, Canada	Belmont HS	6 ft 7 in (2.01 m)	305 lb (138 kg)	Jan 18, 2017
Dontae Bull; OL	Recruit ratings: Scout: Rivals: 247Sports:				
Richard Cage; DL	Corona, California	Eleanor Roosevelt HS	6 ft 2 in (1.88 m)	225 lb (102 kg)	Jan 22, 2017
Richard Cage; DL	Recruit ratings: Scout: Rivals: 247Sports:				
Earl Chambers; DL	Brooklyn, New York	UAB	6 ft 3 in (1.91 m)	235 lb (107 kg)	Feb 1, 2017
Earl Chambers; DL	Recruit ratings: Scout: Rivals: 247Sports:				
Sherman Coleman; DB	Houston, Texas	Cisco CC	5 ft 9 in (1.75 m)	160 lb (73 kg)	Dec 11, 2016
Sherman Coleman; DB	Recruit ratings: Scout: Rivals: 247Sports:				
Chris Coleman; ATH	Bakersfield, California	Garces Memorial HS	5 ft 11 in (1.80 m)	180 lb (82 kg)	Jan 7, 2017
Chris Coleman; ATH	Recruit ratings: Scout: Rivals:				
Damien DeGruy; DL	Harvey, Louisiana	McDonogh HS	6 ft 3 in (1.91 m)	235 lb (107 kg)	Jan 29, 2017
Damien DeGruy; DL	Recruit ratings: Scout: Rivals: 247Sports:				
Wylan Free; DB	Compton, California	Lynwood HS	6 ft 1 in (1.85 m)	175 lb (79 kg)	Jan 21, 2017
Wylan Free; DB	Recruit ratings: Scout: Rivals: 247Sports: ESPN:				
Derrion Grim; WR	Stockton, California	San Joaquin Delta CC	6 ft 0 in (1.83 m)	195 lb (88 kg)	Dec 29, 2016
Derrion Grim; WR	Recruit ratings: Scout: Rivals: 247Sports: ESPN:				
Gunner Javernick; TE	Cañon City, Colorado	Ventura CC	6 ft 5 in (1.96 m)	250 lb (110 kg)	Nov 27, 2016
Gunner Javernick; TE	Recruit ratings: Scout: Rivals: ESPN:				
Patrick Jeune; WR	Inglewood, California	Morningside High School	6 ft 1 in (1.85 m)	180 lb (82 kg)	Aug 1, 2016
Patrick Jeune; WR	Recruit ratings: Scout: Rivals: 247Sports:				
T.J. Mauga; DL	Fallon, Nevada	Churchill County HS	6 ft 3 in (1.91 m)	280 lb (130 kg)	Jan 31, 2017
T.J. Mauga; DL	Recruit ratings: Scout: Rivals: 247Sports:				
Jordan Mims; RB	East Palo Alto, California	Menlo-Atherton HS	5 ft 11 in (1.80 m)	180 lb (82 kg)	Jan 17, 2017
Jordan Mims; RB	Recruit ratings: Scout: Rivals: 247Sports:				
Daniel Moraga; ATH	Oxnard, California	Pacifica HS	6 ft 4 in (1.93 m)	235 lb (107 kg)	Jan 30, 2017
Daniel Moraga; ATH	Recruit ratings: Scout: Rivals: 247Sports:				
Arron Mosby; DB	Sanger, California	Sanger High School	6 ft 3 in (1.91 m)	200 lb (91 kg)	Jan 28, 2017
Arron Mosby; DB	Recruit ratings: Scout: Rivals: 247Sports:				
Emeka Ndoh; DL	Reedley, California	De Anza CC	6 ft 1 in (1.85 m)	265 lb (120 kg)	Dec 11, 2016
Emeka Ndoh; DL	Recruit ratings: Scout: Rivals: 247Sports:				
Zane Pope; ATH	Moorpark, California	Moorpark High School	6 ft 1 in (1.85 m)	185 lb (84 kg)	Jan 22, 2017
Zane Pope; ATH	Recruit ratings: Scout: Rivals: 247Sports:				
Jorge Reyna; QB	Downey, California	West Los Angeles CC	6 ft 0 in (1.83 m)	208 lb (94 kg)	Nov 28, 2016
Jorge Reyna; QB	Recruit ratings: Scout: Rivals: 247Sports:				
Ronnie Rivers; RB	Brentwood, California	Freedom HS	5 ft 8 in (1.73 m)	175 lb (79 kg)	Dec 5, 2016
Ronnie Rivers; RB	Recruit ratings: Scout: Rivals: 247Sports:				
Syrus Tuitele; OL	Chico, California	Pleasant Valley HS	6 ft 6 in (1.98 m)	290 lb (130 kg)	Jan 22, 2017
Syrus Tuitele; OL	Recruit ratings: Scout: Rivals: 247Sports:				
Zelan Tupuola; OL	Carson, California	JSerra Catholic HS	6 ft 3 in (1.91 m)	310 lb (140 kg)	Jan 15, 2017
Zelan Tupuola; OL	Recruit ratings: Scout: Rivals: 247Sports:				
Quireo Woodley; OL	Murrieta, California	Fresno CC	6 ft 3 in (1.91 m)	312 lb (142 kg)	Nov 11, 2015
Quireo Woodley; OL	Recruit ratings: Scout: 247Sports:				
Overall recruit ranking:
Note: In many cases, Scout, Rivals, 247Sports, On3, and ESPN may conflict in their listings of height and weight.; In these cases, the average was taken. ESPN grades are on a 100-point scale.; Sources: "2017 Team Ranking". Rivals.com.

== Schedule ==
Date	Time	Opponent	Rank	Site	TV	Result	Attendance
September 2	7:00 p.m.	Incarnate Word*		Bulldog Stadium; Fresno, CA		W 66–0	39,447
September 9	12:30 p.m.	at No. 1 Alabama*		Bryant–Denny Stadium; Tuscaloosa, AL	ESPN2	L 10–41	101,127
September 16	6:30 p.m.	at No. 6 Washington*		Husky Stadium; Seattle, WA	P12N	L 16–48	68,384
September 30	7:00 p.m.	Nevada		Bulldog Stadium; Fresno, CA	AT&T RM	W 41–21	27,434
October 7	4:30 p.m.	at San Jose State		CEFCU Stadium; San Jose, CA (Valley Cup)	ESPN3	W 27–10	18,483
October 14	7:00 p.m.	New Mexico^{†}		Bulldog Stadium; Fresno, CA	AT&T RM	W 38–0	28,090
October 21	7:30 p.m.	at San Diego State		SDCCU Stadium; San Diego, CA (Battle for the Oil Can)	CBSSN	W 27–3	43,243
October 28	7:00 p.m.	UNLV		Bulldog Stadium; Fresno, CA	AT&T RM	L 16–26	27,922
November 4	7:45 p.m.	BYU*		Bulldog Stadium; Fresno, CA	ESPN2	W 20–13	29,370
November 11	8:00 p.m.	at Hawaii		Aloha Stadium; Honolulu, HI (Golden Screwdriver)	KSEE/Spectrum OC16	W 31–21	21,357
November 18	11:00 a.m.	at Wyoming		War Memorial Stadium; Laramie, WY	AT&T RM	W 13–7	15,440
November 25	12:30 p.m.	No. 23 Boise State		Bulldog Stadium; Fresno, CA (Battle for the Milk Can)	CBSSN	W 28–17	31,526
December 2	4:45 p.m.	at Boise State	No. 25	Albertsons Stadium; Boise, ID (MW Championship Game)	ESPN	L 14–17	24,515
December 24	5:30 p.m.	vs. Houston*		Aloha Stadium; Honolulu, HI (Hawaii Bowl)	ESPN	W 33–27	20,546
*Non-conference game; ^{†}Homecoming; Rankings from AP Poll and CFP Rankings after October 31 released prior to game; All times are in Pacific time

Schedule Source: 2017 Fresno State Bulldogs Football Schedule

== Rankings ==
Ranking movements Legend: ██ Increase in ranking ██ Decrease in ranking — = Not ranked RV = Received votes
	Week															
Poll	Pre	1	2	3	4	5	6	7	8	9	10	11	12	13	14	Final
AP	—	—	—	—	—	—	—	—	—	—	—	—	RV	25	RV	RV
Coaches	—	—	—	—	—	—	—	—	—	—	—	—	RV	RV	RV	RV
CFP	Not released									—	—	—	—	25	—	Not released

== Game summaries ==
=== Incarnate Word ===
Incarnate Word at Fresno State

Team	1	2	3	4	Total
Cardinals	0	0	0	0	0
• Bulldogs	17	17	32	0	66

- Date: September 2, 2017
- Location: Bulldog Stadium
  Fresno, CA
- Game start: 7:06 p.m. PDT
- Elapsed time: 3 hours and 1 minute
- Game attendance: 39,447
- Game weather: Temperature: 102 °F (39 °C) • Weather: Fair • Wind: NW 6 MPH
- Referee: Mike Cuttone
- TV announcers (None): None

=== At Alabama ===
Fresno State at Alabama

Team	1	2	3	4	Total
Bulldogs	3	0	0	7	10
• No. 1 Crimson Tide	14	14	3	10	41

- Date: September 9, 2017
- Location: Bryant–Denny Stadium
  Tuscaloosa, AL
- Game start: 12:35 p.m. PDT
- Elapsed time: 3 hours and 1 minute
- Game attendance: 101,127
- Game weather: Temperature: 79 °F (26 °C) • Weather: Clear and Sunny • Wind: 9 MPH ENE
- Referee: Marc Curles
- TV announcers (ESPN2): Adam Amin, Anthony Becht and Rocky Boiman (sideline)

=== At Washington ===
Fresno State at Washington

Team	1	2	3	4	Total
Bulldogs	0	7	6	3	16
• No. 6 Huskies	27	14	7	0	48

- Date: September 16, 2017
- Location: Husky Stadium
  Seattle, WA
- Game start: 6:40 p.m. PDT
- Elapsed time: 3 hours and 6 minutes
- Game attendance: 68,384
- Game weather: Temperature: 76 °F (24 °C) • Weather: Hazy • Wind: None
- Referee: Michael Mothershed
- TV announcers (P12N): Ted Robinson, Yogi Roth and Jill Savage (sideline)

=== Nevada ===
Nevada at Fresno State

Team	1	2	3	4	Total
Wolf Pack	0	14	0	7	21
• Bulldogs	10	21	7	3	41

- Date: September 30, 2017
- Location: Bulldog Stadium
  Fresno, CA
- Game start: 7:08 p.m. PDT
- Elapsed time: 3 hours and 12 minutes
- Game attendance: 27,434
- Game weather: Temperature: 79 °F (26 °C) • Weather: Clear • Wind: 11 WNW
- Referee: David Alvarez
- TV announcers (AT&T RM): Ari Wolfe, Sherdrick Bonner and Brad Thompson (sideline)

=== At San Jose State ===
Fresno State at San Jose State
(Valley Cup)

Team	1	2	3	4	Total
• Bulldogs	14	7	0	6	27
Spartans	0	0	7	3	10

- Date: October 7, 2017
- Location: CEFCU Stadium
  San Jose, CA
- Game start: 4:36 p.m. PDT
- Elapsed time: 3 hours and 10 minutes
- Game attendance: 18,483
- Game weather: Temperature: 82 °F (28 °C) • Weather: Clear • Wind: WNW 12 MPH
- Referee: Scott Campbell
- TV announcers (ESPN3): Drew Fellios and Forrest Conoly

=== New Mexico ===
New Mexico at Fresno State

Team	1	2	3	4	Total
Lobos	0	0	0	0	0
• Bulldogs	14	7	10	7	38

- Date: October 14, 2017
- Location: Bulldog Stadium
  Fresno, CA
- Game start: 7:08 p.m. PDT
- Elapsed time: 2 hours and 57 minutes
- Game attendance: 28,090
- Game weather: Temperature: 70 °F (21 °C) • Weather: Clear • Wind: 5 MPH
- Referee: Kevin Boitmann
- TV announcers (AT&T RM): Ari Wolfe and Joel Dreessen

=== At San Diego State ===
Fresno State at San Diego State
(Battle for the Oil Can)

Team	1	2	3	4	Total
• Bulldogs	7	10	10	0	27
Aztecs	0	3	0	0	3

- Date: October 21, 2017
- Location: SDCCU Stadium
  San Diego, CA
- Game start: 7:37 p.m. PDT
- Elapsed time: 3 hours and 2 minutes
- Game attendance: 43,243
- Game weather: Temperature: 68 °F (20 °C) • Weather: Clear • Wind: 2 NNW
- Referee: Stephen Baron
- TV announcers (CBSSN): Carter Blackburn, Aaron Taylor and Jenny Dell (sideline)

=== UNLV ===
UNLV at Fresno State

Team	1	2	3	4	Total
• Rebels	3	6	7	10	26
Bulldogs	9	0	7	0	16

- Date: October 28, 2017
- Location: Bulldog Stadium
  Fresno, CA
- Game start: 7:08 p.m. PDT
- Elapsed time: 2 hours and 50 minutes
- Game attendance: 27,922
- Game weather: Temperature: 77 °F (25 °C) • Weather: Clear and Crisp • Wind: 2 MPH
- Referee: Daniel Romeo
- TV announcers (AT&T RM): Drew Goodman, Sherdrick Bonner and Brad Thompson (sideline)

=== BYU ===
BYU at Fresno State

Team	1	2	3	4	Total
Cougars	0	6	7	0	13
• Bulldogs	10	0	3	7	20

- Date: November 4, 2017
- Location: Bulldog Stadium
  Fresno, CA
- Game start: 7:51 p.m. PDT
- Elapsed time: 3 hours and 10 minutes
- Game attendance: 29,370
- Game weather: Temperature: 62 °F (17 °C) • Weather: Cloudy • Wind: NW 3 MPH
- Referee: Reggie Smith
- TV announcers (ESPN2): Roy Philpott and Tom Ramsey

=== At Hawaii ===
Fresno State at Hawaii
(Golden Screwdriver)

Team	1	2	3	4	Total
• Bulldogs	0	21	10	0	31
Rainbow Warriors	7	0	0	14	21

- Date: November 11, 2017
- Location: Aloha Stadium
  Honolulu, HI
- Game start: 8:07 p.m. PST
- Elapsed time: 3 hours and 50 minutes
- Game attendance: 21,357
- Game weather: Temperature: 76 °F (24 °C) • Weather: 84% Humidity and Rain • Wind: NE 8 MPH
- Referee: Michael VanderVelde
- TV announcers (KSEE/Spectrum OC16): Robert Kekaula, Rich Miano and Scott Robbs (sideline)

=== At Wyoming ===
Fresno State at Wyoming

Team	1	2	3	4	Total
• Bulldogs	3	7	3	0	13
Cowboys	0	0	0	7	7

- Date: November 18, 2017
- Location: War Memorial Stadium
  Laramie, WY
- Game start: 11:07 a.m. PST
- Elapsed time: 3 hours and 2 minutes
- Game attendance: 15,440
- Game weather: Temperature: 27 °F (−3 °C) • Weather: Sunny • Wind: WSW 22
- Referee: Brad Van Vark
- TV announcers (AT&T RM): Drew Goodman, Sherdrick Bonner and Brad Thompson (sideline)

=== Boise State ===
Boise State at Fresno State
(Battle for the Milk Can)

Team	1	2	3	4	Total
No. 25 Broncos	7	0	3	7	17
• Bulldogs	7	3	6	12	28

- Date: November 25, 2017
- Location: Bulldog Stadium
  Fresno, CA
- Game start: 12:35 p.m. PST
- Elapsed time: 3 hours and 27 minutes
- Game attendance: 31,526
- Game weather: Temperature: 72 °F (22 °C) • Weather: Sunny • Wind: SW 4 MPH
- Referee: David Alvarez
- TV announcers (CBSSN): Rich Waltz, Jay Feely and Jenny Dell (sideline)

=== At Boise State (Mountain West Championship Game) ===
Fresno State at Boise State
(Mountain West Conference Championship Game)

Team	1	2	3	4	Total
No. 25 Bulldogs	0	14	0	0	14
• Broncos	3	7	0	7	17

- Date: December 2, 2017
- Location: Albertsons Stadium
  Boise, ID
- Game start: 4:50 p.m. PST
- Elapsed time: 3 hours and 27 minutes
- Game attendance: 24,515
- Game weather: Temperature: 40 °F (4 °C) • Weather: Cloudy • Wind: E 4 MPH
- Referee: David Alvarez
- TV announcers (ESPN): Adam Amin, Dusty Dvoracek and Molly McGrath (sideline)

=== vs Houston (Hawaii Bowl) ===
Fresno State vs Houston
(Hawaii Bowl)

Team	1	2	3	4	Total
• Bulldogs	0	13	7	13	33
Cougars	7	3	10	7	27

- Date: December 24, 2017
- Location: Aloha Stadium
  Honolulu, HI
- Game start: 5:36 p.m. PST
- Elapsed time: 3 hours and 41 minutes
- Game attendance: 20,546
- Game weather: Temperature: 81 °F (27 °C) • Weather: Humidity – 45% • Wind: NE 13 MPH
- Referee: Jason Autrey
- TV announcers (ESPN): Chris Cotter, Rod Gilmore and Shelley Smith (sideline)
