= Armani Rogers =

American football player (born 1997)

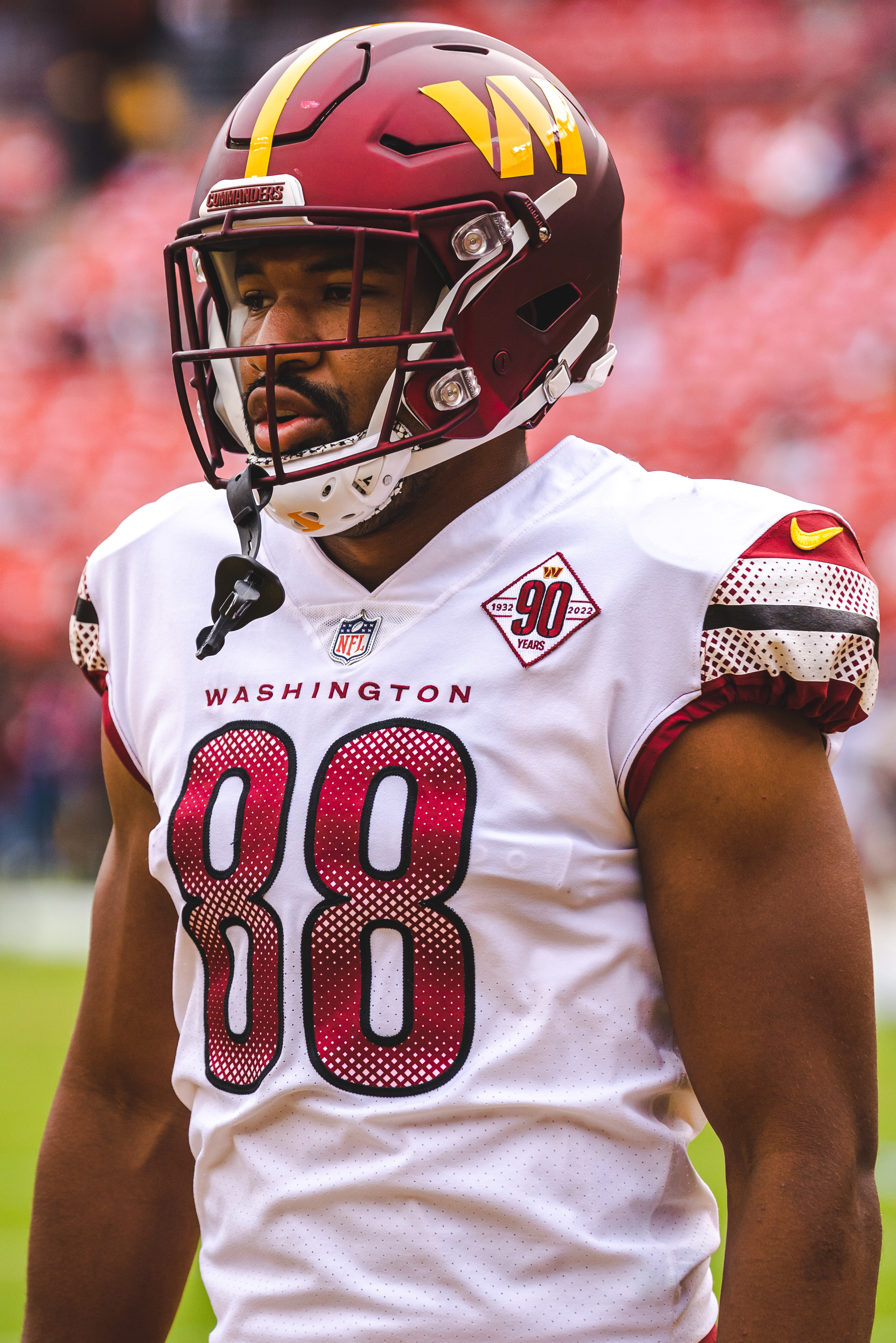
- Rogers with the Washington Commanders in 2022

No. 88 – Dallas Renegades
- Position: Tight end
- Roster status: Active

Personal information
- Born: December 4, 1997 (age 28); Buffalo, New York, U.S.
- Listed height: 6 ft 5 in (1.96 m)
- Listed weight: 233 lb (106 kg)

Career information
- High school: Hamilton (Los Angeles, California)
- College: UNLV (2016–2019); Ohio (2020–2021)
- NFL draft: 2022: undrafted

Career history
- Washington Commanders (2022–2023); Philadelphia Eagles (2024)*; Atlanta Falcons (2024)*; Buffalo Bills (2025)*; Houston Gamblers (2026); Dallas Renegades (2027–present)
- * Offseason or practice squad member only

Awards and highlights
- MW Freshman of the Year (2017)

Career NFL statistics as of 2025
- Receptions: 5
- Receiving yards: 64
- Stats at Pro Football Reference

Armani Lee Rogers (born December 4, 1997) is an American professional football tight end for the Dallas Renegades of the United Football League (UFL). He played college football as a quarterback for the UNLV Rebels and Ohio Bobcats and holds the record for longest run by an NCAA quarterback at 99 yards. Rogers transitioned to tight end after his college career and signed with the Washington Commanders as an undrafted free agent in 2022.

== Early life ==
The son of former NFL linebacker Sam Rogers, Armani was born on December 4, 1997, in Buffalo, New York. He grew up in Los Angeles and attended Alexander Hamilton High School, Armani has four brothers and one sister where he passed for 1,433 yards and 18 touchdowns while rushing for 431 yards and six touchdowns as a senior. Rogers was rated a three-star recruit and initially committed to play college football at California over offers from UCLA, Washington, and Utah. He decommitted during his senior year following changes to California's coaching staff and later signed to play at UNLV after considering Fresno State.

== College career ==
=== UNLV Rebels ===
Rogers began his college career at the University of Nevada, Las Vegas and redshirted as a freshman. He started nine games for the Rebels during his redshirt freshman season and was named the Mountain West Conference Freshman of the Year after completing 99 of 189 pass attempts for 1,471 yards and six touchdowns with five interceptions and setting a school record for rushing yards by a quarterback with 780 and also rushing for eight touchdowns. Rogers suffered a foot injury in the fourth game of his redshirt sophomore year and missed the next six games before returning and finishing the season with 601 passing yards and 10 touchdowns and 565 rushing yards and eight touchdowns. He passed for 393 yards with two touchdowns and three interceptions and rushed 204 yards and two touchdowns in four games as a redshirt junior before again suffering an injury.

=== Ohio Bobcats ===
Rogers transferred to Ohio as a graduate student. In 2020, he was used mostly in offensive package plays and threw for 48 yards and a touchdown while rushing for 114 yards and two touchdowns. Rogers used the extra year of eligibility granted to college athletes in 2020 due to the COVID-19 pandemic and returned to Ohio for a second season. He started five games at quarterback and was also used in offensive packages throughout the season, finishing the season with 334 passing yards and 552 rushing yards and seven touchdowns, including a 99-yard rushing touchdown against the Buffalo Bulls, which set an NCAA record for a quarterback.

=== College statistics ===
Season	Team	Games			Passing								Rushing			
Season	Team	GP	GS	Record (Note: Accounts for only GS as a QB. On 9/25/21, 11/9/21 Rogers started at WR.)	Cmp	Att	Pct	Yds	Y/A	TD	Int	Rtg	Att	Yds	Avg	TD
2016	UNLV	0	0	—	Redshirted (redshirt)											
2017	UNLV	10	9	3–6	99	189	52.4	1,471	7.8	6	5	122.9	146	780	5.3	8
2018	UNLV	6	5	3–2	52	117	44.4	601	5.1	10	4	109.0	93	565	6.1	8
2019	UNLV	5	4	1–3	41	79	51.9	393	5.0	2	3	94.4	50	204	4.1	2
2020	Ohio	3	0	—	5	9	55.6	48	5.3	1	0	137.0	19	114	6.0	2
2021	Ohio	12	7	0–5	29	49	59.2	350	7.1	0	1	115.1	92	552	6.0	7
Career		36	25	7–16	226	443	51.0	2,863	6.5	19	13	113.6	400	2,215	5.5	27

== Professional career ==
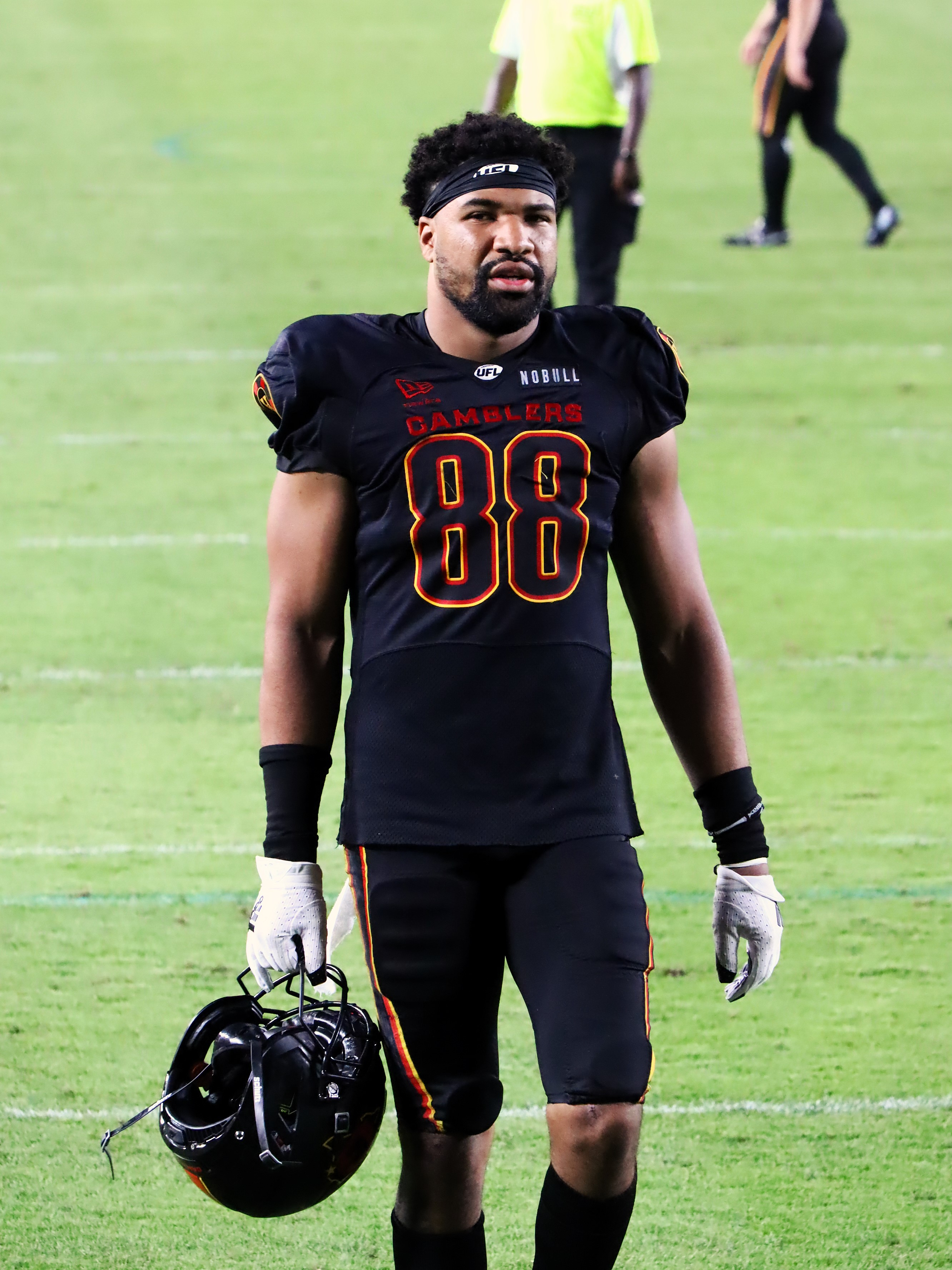
Rogers with the Houston Gamblers in 2026

Pre-draft measurables
Height	Weight	Arm length	Hand span	Wingspan
6 ft 5 in (1.96 m)	226 lb (103 kg)	33 1/8 in (0.84 m)	9 1/2 in (0.24 m)	6 ft 7 1/2 in (2.02 m)
All values from Pro Day

Rogers transitioned to tight end prior to playing in the 2022 East–West Shrine Bowl.

=== Washington Commanders ===
Rogers signed with the Washington Commanders as an undrafted free agent on May 2, 2022. Rogers made his NFL debut in Week 1 against the Jacksonville Jaguars, recording a 23-yard reception from quarterback Carson Wentz in a 28–22 victory. In Week 6 against the Chicago Bears, he made his first career start in a win. The following week against the Green Bay Packers, he recorded a career-high three receptions for 28 yards in a 23–21 victory. In Week 9 against the Minnesota Vikings, he converted a third-and-one on a 24-yard end-around run after taking a handoff from quarterback Taylor Heinicke. On November 19, the Commanders placed Rogers on injured reserve. On January 7, 2023, he was activated from injured reserve. He finished the season having appeared in 11 games with three starts, recording five receptions for 64 yards and two carries for 26 yards. He also played 33 special teams snaps and recorded three total tackles.

On May 24, 2023, Rogers tore his Achilles tendon during a non-contact practice session. He was placed on injured reserve on July 25, 2023.

Rogers was released on August 6, 2024.

=== Philadelphia Eagles ===
On August 7, 2024, Rogers was claimed off waivers by the Philadelphia Eagles. He was waived on August 27.

=== Atlanta Falcons ===
On October 7, 2024, Rogers signed with the Atlanta Falcons practice squad.

=== Buffalo Bills ===
On January 17, 2025, Rogers signed a reserve/future contract with the Buffalo Bills. On March 3, it was announced that Rogers had suffered a torn Achilles tendon while training and would undergo surgery. He was waived with an injury designation on April 18.

=== Houston Gamblers ===
On February 9, 2026, Rogers signed with the Houston Gamblers of the United Football League (UFL). He appeared in all 10 games, making nine starts, and recorded seven receptions for 67 yards in his first game action since the 2024 preseason with the Eagles.
