= 2014 Holiday Bowl =

2014 National University Holiday Bowl
- 37th Holiday Bowl
Nebraska Cornhuskers	USC Trojans
(9–3)	(8–4)
Big Ten	Pac-12
42	45
Head coach: Barney Cotton (interim)	Head coach: Steve Sarkisian
AP / Coaches; 25 / 22	AP / CFP; 24 / 24
	1	2	3	4	Total
Nebraska	17	0	17	8	42
USC	10	14	21	0	45
- Date: December 27, 2014
- Season: 2014
- Stadium: San Diego Stadium
- Location: San Diego, California
- MVP: Offense: USC QB Cody Kessler; Defense: USC DE Leonard Williams
- Favorite: USC by 7
- Referee: Randy Christal (Big 12)
- Attendance: 55,789
- Payout: US$2.075 million

United States TV coverage
- Network: ESPN / ESPN Radio
- Announcers: Rece Davis, Jesse Palmer, David Pollack, Samantha Ponder (ESPN); Bill Rosinski, David Norrie, Joe Schad (ESPN Radio)

The 2014 Holiday Bowl, known as the National University Holiday Bowl for sponsorship purposes, was the thirty-seventh edition of the college football bowl game, played on December 27, 2014 at San Diego Stadium in San Diego, California. Part of the 2014–15 bowl season, it featured the Nebraska Cornhuskers of the Big Ten and USC Trojans of the Pac-12. The game kicked off at 5:00 p.m. PST and was broadcast on ESPN and ESPN Radio.

== Teams ==
The 2014 Holiday Bowl was the fifth all-time and first postseason meeting between Nebraska and USC, with the Trojans leading 3–0–1 prior to the game.

Under first-year head coach Steve Sarkisian, USC entered the Holiday Bowl as a seven-point favorite over Nebraska. The Cornhuskers, weeks removed from firing Bo Pelini, were led by interim head coach Barney Cotton.

== Game ==
After a Nebraska field goal on the opening possession of the game, freshman All-American Adoree' Jackson returned the ensuing kickoff for a touchdown, the longest return in Holiday Bowl history. Nebraska responded quickly, scoring twice more in the game's opening frame to take a seven-point lead. USC's offense controlled the second quarter, using drives of ten and twelve plays to take a 24–17 lead into halftime.

USC opened the second half with a short pass to Jackson, who converted it into his second lengthy touchdown to give the Trojans a two-score lead. Long drives by each team kept the gap at fourteen points before a two-play Trojans touchdown drive made the score 45–27. As a chaotic third quarter came to a close, Tommy Armstrong hit Jordan Westerkamp for a winding 65-yard touchdown, the sixth score of the quarter.

On fourth down in the Trojans red zone, Armstrong stumbled into the end zone to cut Nebraska's deficit to three after a conversion pass to Bell. The Cornhuskers drove into USC territory with minutes remaining, but the Trojans stopped De'Mornay Pierson-El on fourth down to seal a 45–42 victory.

=== Scoring summary ===
Qtr	Time	Drive			Team	Detail	Score	
Qtr	Time	Plays	Yards	TOP	Team	Detail	NU	USC
1	11:05	5	29	1:47	NU	Drew Brown 34-yd field goal	3	0
1	10:54	–	–	0:11	USC	Adoree' Jackson 98-yd kickoff return (Andre Heidari kick)	3	7
1	8:23	6	53	2:31	NU	Kenny Bell 18-yd pass from Tommy Armstrong (Brown kick)	10	7
1	6:05	8	42	2:18	USC	Heidari 42-yd field goal	10	10
1	1:25	6	39	2:42	NU	De'Mornay Pierson-El 9-yd pass from Armstrong (Brown kick)	17	10
2	13:11	10	75	3:14	USC	Nelson Agholor 17-yd pass from Cody Kessler (Heidari kick)	17	17
2	6:39	12	80	3:32	USC	Javorius Allen 2-yd run (Heidari kick)	17	24
3	12:01	1	71	0:12	USC	Jackson 71-yd pass from Kessler (Heidari kick)	17	31
3	9:41	7	73	2:20	NU	Ameer Abdullah 20-yd run (Brown kick)	24	31
3	8:06	5	68	1:35	USC	Allen 44-yd run (Heidari kick)	24	38
3	2:28	6	9	3:25	NU	Brown 25-yd field goal	27	38
3	2:03	2	65	0:25	USC	Bryce Dixon 20-yd pass from Kessler (Heidari kick)	27	45
3	0:24	3	64	1:39	NU	Jordan Westerkamp 65-yd pass from Armstrong (Brown kick)	34	45
4	6:52	9	77	2:51	NU	Armstrong 15-yd run (Armstrong pass to Bell)	42	45

=== Team statistics ===
Statistic	Nebraska	USC
First downs	28	22
Rushes–yards	43–144	34–194
Comp.–att.–yards	32–51–381	23–39–321
Total offense	525	515
Turnovers	1	1
Punts–average	7–44.7	9–34.8
Penalties–yards	7–45	12–97
Time of possession	34:26	25:34

== Starting lineups ==
Nebraska	Position	USC
Offense
11 Cethan Carter	TE	82 Randall Telfer
80 Kenny Bell	WR	15 Nelson Agholor
15 De'Mornay Pierson-El	WR	7 Steven Mitchell
1 Jordan Westerkamp	WR	9 JuJu Smith
4 Tommy Armstrong	QB	6 Cody Kessler
8 Ameer Abdullah	RB	37 Javorius Allen
71 Alex Lewis	LT	50 Toa Lobendahn
68 Jake Cotton	LG	51 Damien Mama
66 Dylan Utter	C	75 Max Tuerk
74 Mike Moudy	RG	60 Viane Talamaivao
78 Givens Price	RT	73 Zach Banner
Defense
7 Maliek Collins	DT	52 Delvon Simmons
98 Vincent Valentine	DT	
4 Randy Gregory	DE	90 Claude Pelon
90 Greg McMullen	DE	94 Leonard Williams
13 Zaire Anderson	LB	10 Hayes Pullard
52 Josh Banderas	LB	56 Anthony Sarao
	LB	58 J. R. Tavai
23 Daniel Davie	CB	2 Adoree' Jackson
5 Josh Mitchell	CB	6 Josh Shaw
28 Byerson Cockrell	S	27 Gerald Bowman
6 Corey Cooper	S	21 Su'a Cravens
25 Nate Gerry	S	24 John Plattenburg
