= 2014 USC Trojans football team =

American college football season

2014 USC Trojans football

Holiday Bowl champion

Holiday Bowl, W 45–42 vs. Nebraska
- Conference: Pac-12 Conference
- South Division

Ranking
- Coaches: No. 21
- AP: No. 20
- Record: 9–4 (6–3 Pac-12)
- Head coach: Steve Sarkisian (1st season)
- Offensive coordinator: Clay Helton (2nd season)
- Offensive scheme: Multiple
- Defensive coordinator: Justin Wilcox (1st season)
- Base defense: Multiple 3–4
- Captain: 6: Nelson Agholor; Cody Kessler; Hayes Pullard; Josh Shaw; Max Tuerk; Leonard Williams
- Home stadium: Los Angeles Memorial Coliseum

2014 Pac-12 Conference football standings
	Conf.			Overall
Team	W		L	W		L
North Division
No. 2 Oregon xy$^	8	–	1	13	–	2
Stanford	5	–	4	8	–	5
Washington	4	–	5	8	–	6
California	3	–	6	5	–	7
Oregon State	2	–	7	5	–	7
Washington State	2	–	7	3	–	9
South Division
No. 19 Arizona xy	7	–	2	10	–	4
No. 10 UCLA	6	–	3	10	–	3
No. 12 Arizona State	6	–	3	10	–	3
No. 20 USC	6	–	3	9	–	4
No. 21 Utah	5	–	4	9	–	4
Colorado	0	–	9	2	–	10
Championship: Oregon 51, Arizona 13
^ – College Football Playoff participant; $ – Conference champion; x – Division champion/co-champions; y – Championship game participant; Rankings from AP Poll

The 2014 USC Trojans football team represented the University of Southern California in the 2014 college football season. USC played their home games at the Los Angeles Memorial Coliseum and were members of the South Division of the Pac-12 Conference. They were led by Steve Sarkisian, who returned to USC after coaching Pac-12 opponent Washington for five years. They finished the season 9–4, 6–3 in Pac-12 play to finish in a three-way tie for second place in the South Division. They were invited to the Holiday Bowl where they defeated Nebraska.

== Personnel ==
=== Coaching staff ===
Name	Position	Seasons at USC	Alma mater	Before USC
Steve Sarkisian	Head coach	1	BYU (1997)	Washington – Head coach (2013)
Tim Drevno	Offensive line coach / running game coordinator	1	Cal State Fullerton (1992)	San Francisco 49ers - OL Coach (2013)
Clay Helton	Offensive coordinator / quarterbacks coach	4	Houston (1994)	Memphis - OC coordinator (2009)
Keith Heyward	Defensive backs coach / pass game coordinator defense	1	Oregon State (2002)	Washington - DB Coach (2013)
Tee Martin	Wide receivers coach / pass game coordinator	3	Tennessee (2000)	Kentucky - WR Coach (2011)
Johnny Nansen	Running backs coach / special teams coach / assistant head coach	1	Washington State (1997)	Washington - ST coordinator / RB Coach (2013)
Peter Sirmon	Linebackers coach / recruiting coordinator / associate head coach Defense	1	Oregon (1999)	Washington - LB Coach (2013)
Marques Tuiasosopo	Tight ends coach / associate head coach Offense	1	Washington (2001)	Washington - QB Coach (2013)
Justin Wilcox	Defensive coordinator	1	Oregon (1999)	Washington - DC coordinator (2013)
Chris Wilson	Defensive line coach	1	Oklahoma (1992)	Georgia - DL Coach (2013)
Ivan Lewis	Strength and conditioning	1	San Diego (2003)	Washington - Strength and Conditioning (2013)
Ross Cumming	Graduate assistant coach (linebackers)	2	USC (2012)	USC - Reserve Linebacker [Player] (2011)
Jon Farmerie	Graduate assistant coach (secondary)	1	University of La Verne (2008)	California - Assistant DB Coach (2013)
Kyle Williams	Graduate assistant coach (secondary)	1	Kansas State (2006)	Evangel University - DB Coach / st coordinator (2013)
Jaron Fairman	Graduate assistant coach (special team)	1	Fresno State (2007)	Crespi Carmelite High School - WR Coach / st coordinator (2013)

=== Roster ===
2014 USC Trojans Football
Quarterback: 4 Max Browne – (redshirt) freshman (6'5, 220); 6 Cody Kessler – (redshirt) junior (6'1, 210); 8 Andrew Zolintakis – freshman (6'0, 170); 10 Jalen Greene – freshman (6'2, 200); 14 Conner Sullivan – (redshirt) sophomore (6'0, 195); 15 Michael Bowman – freshman (6'4, 200); 16 Anthony Neyer – (redshirt) senior (6'2, 205); 17 Alex Bridgford – (redshirt) sophomore (6'3, 190); 19 Larry Tuileta – freshman (6'2, 200); Running back: 22 Justin Davis – sophomore (6'1, 195); 23 Tre Madden – (redshirt) junior (6'1, 225); 24 Stefan Smith – freshman (6'1, 195); 26 James Toland IV – (redshirt) freshman (5'11, 185); 31 Soma Vainuku – (redshirt) junior (6'0, 270) - (FB); 37 Javorius 'Buck' Allen – (redshirt) junior (6'1, 220); 38 Jahleel Pinner – junior (5'11, 235) - (FB); 40 Pat Hart – (redshirt) freshman (6'0, 240) - (FB); 47 Brett Sarem – freshman (6'0, 225) - (FB); Wide receiver: 1 Darreus Rogers – sophomore (6'1, 21595); 7 Steven Mitchell – (redshirt) freshman (5'10, 185); 8 George Farmer – (redshirt) junior (6'1, 220); 9 JuJu Smith – freshman (6'2, 210) - (+S); 14 Rahshead Johnson – freshman (5'11, 175) - (+CB); 15 Nelson Agholor – junior (6'1, 190); 18 Ajene Harris – freshman (5'11, 180); 27 David Mellstrom – (redshirt) junior (6'0, 180); 28 Christian Tober – junior (5'8, 175); 44 Christian Guzman – (redshirt) sophomore (6'3, 220); 83 George Katrib – junior (6'0, 185); 84 Aaron Minor – (redshirt) freshman (6'2, 200); 86 Robby Kolanz – (redshirt) sophomore (5'10, 170); Tight end: 13 Bryce Dixon – freshman (6'4, 240); 49 Conner Spears - Sophomore (6'6, 240); 82 Randall Telfer – (redshirt) senior (6'4, 260); 87 Chris Willson – (redshirt) senior (6'5, 250); 88 Jalen Cope-Fitzpatrick – junior (6'4, 250)	Offensive lineman: 50 Toa Lobendahn - OG-OT – freshman (6'3, 280); 51 Damien Mama - OG – freshman (6'5, 370); 56 Jordan Austin - OT – freshman (6'5, 280); 60 Viane Talamaivao - C-OG – freshman (6'3, 330); 62 Khaliel Rodgers - OG – (redshirt) freshman (6'3, 315); 63 Giovanni Di Poalo - C – (redshirt) senior (6'4, 280); 64 Richie Wenzel - C – freshman (6'2, 280); 65 Erick Jepsen - OG – (redshirt) junior (6'2, 295); 67 Quinn Bassler - OT – freshman (6'6, 280); 68 Jordan Simmons - OG – (redshirt) sophomore (6'4, 350); 70 Aundrey Walker - OG – senior (6'6, 315); 72 Chad Wheeler - OT – (redshirt) sophomore (6'7, 280); 73 Zach Banner - OT – (redshirt) sophomore (6'9, 350); 74 Nico Falah - OT – (redshirt) freshman (6'4, 285); 75 Max Tuerk - OT-OG-C – junior (6'6, 285); 76 Nathan Guertler - OT– (redshirt) senior (6'5, 270); 77 Chris Brown - OT – freshman (6'5, 295); Defensive tackle: 52 Delvon Simmons – (redshirt) junior (6'5, 295); 90 Claude Pelon - (redshirt) Junior (6'4, 295); 95 Kenny Bigelow – (redshirt) freshman (6'3, 310); 96 Joey Augello – junior (6'0, 290); 98 Cody Temple – (redshirt) junior (6'2, 310); 99 Antwaun Woods – (redshirt) junior (6'1, 325); Defensive end: 79 Jeff Miller – (redshirt) sophomore (6'1, 245); 91 Teddy Baker – (redshirt) senior (6'4, 265) - (+TE); 93 Greg Townsend Jr. – (redshirt) junior (6'3, 275); 94 Leonard Williams – junior (6'5, 300); 97 Christian Bradley – junior (6'2, 210); Placekicker: 39 Alex Wood – (redshirt) sophomore (5'10, 175); 39 Matt Boermeester – sophomore (6'0, 185); 46 Wyatt Schmidt – freshman (6'3, 205) - (+P); 46 Reid Budrovich – freshman (6'0, 180); 48 Andre Heidari – senior (5'11, 220); Punter: 35 Kris Albarado – (redshirt) junior (5'10, 200); 48 Jack Basalari – (redshirt) freshman (5'11, 175)	Linebacker: 10 Hayes Pullard - ILB – (redshirt) senior (6'1, 235); 18 Quinton Powell – OLB – sophomore (6'2, 200); 19 Michael Hutchings – ILB – sophomore (6'1, 210); 34 Olajuwon Tucker - ILB – freshman (6'3, 220); 40 Jabari Ruffin - OLB – (redshirt) sophomore (6'3, 240); 42 Uchenna Nwosu - OLB-ILB – freshman (6'3, 210); 44 Malik Dorton - OLB – freshman (6'2, 250); 45 Charles Burks - OLB – (redshirt) junior (5'11, 225); 47 Scott "Starr" Felix - OLB – (redshirt) sophomore (6'2, 230); 49 Matt Miller - ILB – freshman (6'1, 225); 50 Grant Moore - ILB – freshman (6'1, 220); 51 Joel Foy - ILB – (redshirt) freshman (6'2, 215); 53 Alex Moore - ILB – freshman (6'2, 220); 54 Reuben Peters - ILB – freshman (6'1, 220); 55 Lamar Dawson – ILB – senior (6'1, 230); 56 Anthony Sarao - ILB – (redshirt) junior (6'0, 220); 57 Nick Schlossberg - ILB – (redshirt) sophomore (6'0, 215); 58 J.R. Tavai - OLB – senior (6'2, 250); 59 Don Hill - OLB – freshman (6'3, 245); Cornerback: 2 Adoree' Jackson – freshman (5'11, 185) - (+WR); 4 Chris Hawkins – (redshirt) freshman (5'11, 185); 6 Josh Shaw – (redshirt) senior (6'1, 200) - (+S); 13 Kevon Seymour – junior (6'0, 185); 17 Devian Shelton – (redshirt) sophomore (6'1, 180); 23 Jonathan Lockett – freshman (5'11, 175); 25 Lamont Simmons – freshman (6'2, 185); 28 Ryan Dillard – junior (5'9, 185); 29 Kevin Carrasco – sophomore (6'0, 185); 38 Jalen Jones – freshman (5'8, 155); Safety: 21 Su'a Cravens – sophomore (6'1, 225); 22 Leon McQuay III – sophomore (6'1, 185); 24 John Plattenburg – freshman (5'11, 180) - (+CB); 26 Davonte Nunnery – freshman (5'11, 210); 27 Gerald Bowman – (redshirt) senior (6'0, 205); 36 Joe Harding – freshman (5'10, 180); 37 Matt Lopes – (redshirt) freshman (5'11, 180); 41 Rob Dooley – (redshirt) sophomore (6'1, 195); Long snappers: 61 Peter McBride – (redshirt) junior (6'1, 215); 92 Zach Smith – sophomore (6'1, 210)
+ : 2014 USC Trojans Football Commits (07/07/2014)

=== Returning starters ===
USC returns 16 starters in 2014, including eight on offense, eight on defense, and the starting kicker, punter & long snapper.

Key departures include Kevin Graf (OT), Marqise Lee (WR), Silas Redd (RB), Xavier Grimble (TE), Marcus Martin (C), George Uko (DE / DT), Devon Kennard (DE), Morgan Breslin (LB), Dion Bailey (LB / S), and Demetrius Wright (S)

==== Offense (8) ====
Player	Class	Position
Cody Kessler	Junior (redshirt)	Quarterback
Javorius 'Buck' Allen*	Junior (redshirt)	Tailback
Tre Madden*	Junior (redshirt)	Tailback
Soma Vainuku*	Junior (redshirt)	Fullback
Jahleel Pinner*	Junior	Fullback
Nelson Agholor	Junior	Wide receiver
Randall Telfer	Senior (redshirt)	Tight end
Max Tuerk	Junior	Left tackle
Aundrey Walker	Senior	Left guard
Chad Wheeler	Sophomore (redshirt)	Right guard

==== Defense (8) ====
Player	Class	Position
Leonard Williams	Junior	Defensive end
Antwaun Woods	Junior (redshirt)	Defensive tackle
Lamar Dawson*	Senior	Inside linebacker
Anthony Sarao*	Junior (redshirt)	Inside linebacker
Hayes Pullard	Senior (redshirt)	Inside linebacker
J.R. Tavai	Senior	Outside Linebacker
Josh Shaw	Senior (redshirt)	Cornerback
Kevon Seymour	Junior	Cornerback
Su'a Cravens	Sophomore	Safety

==== Special teams (3) ====
Player	Class	Position
Andre Heidari	Senior	Placekicker
Kris Albarado	Junior (redshirt)	Punter
Peter McBride	Junior (redshirt)	Long snapper

- : Co-Starter in 2013

=== Depth chart ===
Defense

FS
John Plattenburg*
Leon McQuay III
Rob Dooley

WLB	ILB	ILB	SLB
J.R. Tavai	Hayes Pullard	Anthony Sarao	Su'a Cravens
Scott 'Starr' Felix	Michael Hutchings^	Olajuwon Tucker*	Uchenna Nwosu
Charles Burks	Reuben Peters	Joel Foy	Quinton Powell

SS
Gerald Bowman
Josh Shaw
JuJu Smith * #

CB
Kevon Seymour
Jonathan Lockett*
Devian Shelton

DE	NT	DE
Delvon Simmons	Antwaun Woods	Leonard Williams
Claudeson Pelon	Cody Temple	Greg Townsend Jr.
Don Hill	Jeff Miller	Malik Dorton*

CB
Adoree' Jackson*#
Chris Hawkins
Ryan Dillard

Offense

WR
Nelson Agholor
George Farmer
Darreus Rogers

LT	LG	C	RG	RT
Toa Lobendahn*	Damien Mama*	Max Tuerk	Viane Talamaivao*	Zach Banner
Aundrey Walker	Khaliel Rodgers	Giovanni Di Poalo	Chris Brown*	Nathan Guertler
Nico Falah	Erick Jepsen	Richie Wenzel	⋅	Quinn Bassler

TE
Randall Telfer
Bryce Dixon
Teddy Baker

WR
JuJu Smith * #
Adoree' Jackson* #
Steven Mitchell

QB
Cody Kessler
Max Browne
Jalen Greene*/ Conner Sullivan

Key reserves
Jabari Ruffin - OLB (Out for Season - Knee)
Kenny Bigelow - DT (Out for Season - Knee)
Chad Wheeler - OT (Out for Season - Knee)
Lamar Dawson - LB (Injury - Knee)
Tre Madden - TB (Injury - Toe)
Jordan Simmons - OG (Injury - Knee)
Jordan Austin - OT (Injury - Hip)

RB
Javorius 'Buck' Allen
Justin Davis
James Toland IV

FB
Jahleel Pinner
Soma Vainuku
Pat Hart

Special teams
PK Andre Heidari
PK Alex Wood
P Kris Albarado
KR Adoree' Jackson* / Nelson Agholor / JuJu Smith*
PR Nelson Agholor / Adoree' Jackson*
LS Zach Smith
H Conner Sullivan

Rookies : *

Double Position : #

=== Recruiting class ===
College recruiting (2014)
Name	Hometown	School	Height	Weight	Commit date
Adoree' Jackson #3 CB	Gardena, CA	Junipero Serra High School	5 ft 10 in (1.78 m)	182 lb (83 kg)	February 5, 2014 (Signed)
Adoree' Jackson #3 CB	Recruit ratings: Rivals:				
John 'Juju' Smith #3 ATH (S / WR)	Long Beach, CA	Long Beach Polytechnic High School	6 ft 1 in (1.85 m)	206 lb (93 kg)	February 5, 2014 (Signed)
John 'Juju' Smith #3 ATH (S / WR)	Recruit ratings: Rivals:				
Damien Mama #4 OG	Bellflower, CA	St. John Bosco High School	6 ft 4 in (1.93 m)	370 lb (170 kg)	February 5, 2014 (Signed)
Damien Mama #4 OG	Recruit ratings: Rivals:				
Bryce Dixon #1 TE	Ventura, CA	Saint Bonaventure High School	6 ft 4 in (1.93 m)	230 lb (100 kg)	January 4, 2014 / February 5, 2014 (Signed)
Bryce Dixon #1 TE	Recruit ratings: Rivals:				
Viane Talamaivao #5 OG	Corona, CA	Centennial High School	6 ft 2 in (1.88 m)	330 lb (150 kg)	November 18, 2013 / February 5, 2014 (Signed)
Viane Talamaivao #5 OG	Recruit ratings: Rivals:				
Toa Lobendahn #8 OG	La Habra, CA	La Habra High School	6 ft 3 in (1.91 m)	293 lb (133 kg)	June 12, 2012 / January 13, 2014 (Signed)
Toa Lobendahn #8 OG	Recruit ratings: Rivals:				
Malik Dorton #21 DE / OLB	Bellflower, CA	Saint John Bosco High School	6 ft 2 in (1.88 m)	235 lb (107 kg)	August 23, 2013 / February 5, 2014 (Signed)
Malik Dorton #21 DE / OLB	Recruit ratings: Rivals:				
Rahshead Johnson #29 ATH (WR)	Long Beach, CA	Cabrillo High School	5 ft 10 in (1.78 m)	164 lb (74 kg)	January 4, 2014 / February 5, 2014 (Signed)
Rahshead Johnson #29 ATH (WR)	Recruit ratings: Rivals:				
Chris Brown #16 OT	Los Angeles, CA	Loyola High School	6 ft 6 in (1.98 m)	290 lb (130 kg)	December 16, 2012 / February 5, 2014 (Signed)
Chris Brown #16 OT	Recruit ratings: Rivals:				
Don Hill #29 DE	Boise, ID	Timberline High School	6 ft 4 in (1.93 m)	235 lb (107 kg)	December 15, 2013 / January 13, 2014 (Signed)
Don Hill #29 DE	Recruit ratings: Rivals:				
Claudeson Pelon #6 DT (JC)	Orlando, FL	Mesa Community College	6 ft 5 in (1.96 m)	280 lb (130 kg)	December 11, 2013 (Signed)
Claudeson Pelon #6 DT (JC)	Recruit ratings: Rivals:				
Jonathan Lockett #25 CB	Santa Ana, CA	Mater Dei High School	5 ft 11 in (1.80 m)	168 lb (76 kg)	December 11, 2013 / February 5, 2014 (Signed)
Jonathan Lockett #25 CB	Recruit ratings: Rivals:				
Jalen Greene #27 QB	Gardena, CA	Junipero Serra High School	6 ft 2 in (1.88 m)	194 lb (88 kg)	December 22, 2013 / January 13, 2014 (Signed)
Jalen Greene #27 QB	Recruit ratings: Rivals:				
Uchenna Nwosu #61 OLB	Torrance, CA	Narbonne High School	6 ft 2 in (1.88 m)	195 lb (88 kg)	October 08, 2013 / February 5, 2014 (Signed)
Uchenna Nwosu #61 OLB	Recruit ratings: Rivals:				
John Plattenburg #72 S	Houston, TX	Lamar High School	5 ft 10 in (1.78 m)	179 lb (81 kg)	January 6, 2014 / February 5, 2014 (Signed)
John Plattenburg #72 S	Recruit ratings: Rivals:				
Ajene Harris #100 ATH (WR)	Los Angeles, CA	Crenshaw High School	5 ft 10 in (1.78 m)	176 lb (80 kg)	November 07, 2013 / February 5, 2014 (Signed)
Ajene Harris #100 ATH (WR)	Recruit ratings: Rivals:				
Lamont Simmons #66 CB	Jacksonville, FL	Raines High School	6 ft 2 in (1.88 m)	180 lb (82 kg)	February 5, 2014 (Signed)
Lamont Simmons #66 CB	Recruit ratings: Rivals:				
Olajuwon Tucker #120 OLB	Gardena, CA	Junipero Serra High School	6 ft 3 in (1.91 m)	214 lb (97 kg)	October 18, 2013 / February 5, 2014 (Signed)
Olajuwon Tucker #120 OLB	Recruit ratings: Rivals:				
Jordan Austin #140 OT	Claremont, CA	Claremont High School	6 ft 5 in (1.96 m)	273 lb (124 kg)	June 28, 2013 / January 13, 2014 (Signed)
Jordan Austin #140 OT	Recruit ratings: Rivals:				
Overall recruit ranking: Rivals: ?
Note: In many cases, Scout, Rivals, 247Sports, On3, and ESPN may conflict in their listings of height and weight.; In these cases, the average was taken. ESPN grades are on a 100-point scale.; Sources: "2014 Team Ranking". Rivals.com.

== 2014 NFL draft ==
Round	Pick	Player	Position	NFL team
2	39	Marqise Lee	Wide receiver	Jacksonville Jaguars
3	70	Marcus Martin	Center	San Francisco 49ers
5	174	Devon Kennard	Outside linebacker	New York Giants
UFA	-	Silas Redd	Running back	Washington Redskins
UFA	-	George Uko	Defensive end	Tampa Bay Buccaneers Practice Squad
UFA	-	Xavier Grimble	Tight end	San Francisco 49ers Practice Squad
UFA	-	Kevin Graf	Offensive tackle	Philadelphia Eagles Practice Squad
UFA	-	Dion Bailey	Safety	Free Agency
UFA	-	Morgan Breslin	Outside linebacker	Free Agency
UFA	-	Demetrius Wright	Cornerback	Free Agency
UFA	-	John Martinez	Offensive guard	Free Agency

== Schedule ==
Date	Time	Opponent	Rank	Site	TV	Result	Attendance
August 30	4:30 p.m.	Fresno State*	No. 15	Los Angeles Memorial Coliseum; Los Angeles, CA	FOX	W 52–13	76,037
September 6	12:30 p.m.	at No. 13 Stanford	No. 14	Stanford Stadium; Stanford, CA (rivalry)	ABC	W 13–10	50,814
September 13	5:00 p.m.	at Boston College*	No. 9	Alumni Stadium; Chestnut Hill, MA	ESPN	L 31–37	41,632
September 27	7:30 pm	Oregon State	No. 18	Los Angeles Memorial Coliseum; Los Angeles, CA	ESPN	W 35–10	74,521
October 4	4:30 p.m.	Arizona State	No. 16	Los Angeles Memorial Coliseum; Los Angeles, CA	FOX	L 34–38	70,115
October 11	7:30 p.m.	at No. 10 Arizona		Arizona Stadium; Tucson, AZ	ESPN2	W 28–26	56,754
October 18	3:00 p.m.	Colorado^{†}	No. 22	Los Angeles Memorial Coliseum; Los Angeles, CA	P12N	W 56–28	74,756
October 25	7:00 p.m.	at No. 19 Utah	No. 20	Rice-Eccles Stadium; Salt Lake City, UT	FS1	L 21–24	47,619
November 1	1:30 p.m.	at Washington State		Martin Stadium; Pullman, WA	P12N	W 44–17	25,012
November 13	6:00 p.m.	California		Los Angeles Memorial Coliseum; Los Angeles, CA	ESPN	W 38–30	64,615
November 22	5:00 p.m.	at No. 9 UCLA	No. 19	Rose Bowl; Pasadena, CA (Victory Bell)	ABC	L 20–38	82,431
November 29	12:30 p.m.	Notre Dame*		Los Angeles Memorial Coliseum; Los Angeles, CA (Jeweled Shillelagh)	FOX	W 49–14	79,586
December 27	5:00 p.m.	vs. Nebraska*	No. 24	Qualcomm Stadium; San Diego, CA (Holiday Bowl)	ESPN	W 45–42	55,789
*Non-conference game; ^{†}Homecoming; Rankings from AP Poll and CFP Rankings after October 28 released prior to game; All times are in Pacific time

== Game summaries ==
=== Fresno State ===
Team	1	2	3	4	Total
Fresno St	0	7	6	0	13
• USC	21	10	21	0	52

- Date: August 30
- Location: Los Angeles Memorial Coliseum
- Game start: 7:30 p.m. EST
- Television network: Fox

Scoring summary
Q1	8:45	USC	Kessler 1 yard run (Heidari kick)	USC 7–0
Q1	5:17	USC	Agholor 10 yard pass from Kessler (Heidari kick)	USC 14–0
Q1	1:04	USC	Agholor 5 yard pass from Kessler (Heidari kick)	USC 21–0
Q2	10:56	USC	Heidari 27 yard field goal	USC 24–0
Q2	6:58	FRES	Waller 1 yard run (McGuire kick)	USC 24–7
Q2	:53	USC	Jackson 18 yard pass from Kessler (Heidari kick)	USC 31–7
Q3	12:53	FRES	Waller 2 yard run (kick failed)	USC 31–13
Q3	8:56	USC	Allen 9 yard run (Heidari kick)	USC 38–13
Q3	4:21	USC	Dixon 22 yard pass from Kessler (Heidari kick)	USC 45–13
Q3	2:47	USC	Vainku 11 yard run (Heidari kick)	USC 52–13

=== Stanford ===
Team	1	2	3	4	Total
• USC	7	0	3	3	13
Stanford	0	10	0	0	10

- Date: September 6
- Location: Stanford Stadium
- Game start: 3:30 p.m. EST
- Television network: ABC

Scoring summary
Q1	4:26	USC	Davis 1 yard run (Heidari kick)	USC 7–0
Q2	7:45	STAN	Skov 2 yard run (Williamson kick)	Tie 7–7
Q2	:11	STAN	Williamson 33 yard field goal	STAN 10–7
Q3	:53	USC	Heidari 25 yard field goal	Tie 10–10
Q3	2:30	USC	Heidari 53 yard field goal	USC 13–10

=== Boston College ===
Team	1	2	3	4	Total
USC	10	7	0	14	31
• Boston College	0	20	7	10	37

- Date: September 13
- Location: Alumni Stadium
- Game start: 8:00 p.m. EST
- Television network: ESPN

Scoring summary
Q1	6:05	USC	Farmer 8 yard pass from Kessler (Heidari kick)	USC 7–0
Q1	3:16	USC	Heidari 52 yard field goal	USC 10–0
Q2	14:56	BC	Rouse 4 yard run (kick failed)	USC 10–6
Q2	14:08	USC	Allen 51 yard pass from Kessler (Heidari kick)	USC 17–6
Q2	10:08	BC	Hillman 3 yard run (Launceford kick)	USC 17–13
Q2	1:27	BC	Alston 54 yard run (Launceford kick)	BC 20–17
Q3	7:06	BC	Hillman 1 yard run (Launceford kick)	BC 27–17
Q4	7:42	BC	Launceford 25 yard field goal	BC 30–17
Q4	4:32	USC	Agholor 10 yard pass from Kessler (Heidari kick)	BC 30–24
Q4	3:30	BC	Murphy 66 yard run (Launceford kick)	BC 37–24
Q4	1:18	USC	Rogers 14 yard pass from Kessler (Heidari kick)	BC 37–31

=== Oregon State ===
Team	1	2	3	4	Total
Oregon St	7	3	0	0	10
• USC	7	14	0	14	35

- Date: September 27
- Location: Los Angeles Memorial Coliseum
- Game start: 10:30 p.m. EST
- Television network: ESPN

Scoring summary
Q1	5:11	USC	Cravens 31 yard interception return (Heidari kick)	USC 7–0
Q1	4:57	ORST	Murphy 97 yard kickoff return (Romaine kick)	Tie 7–7
Q2	11:14	ORST	Romaine 38 yard field goal	ORST 10–7
Q2	7:16	USC	Davis 16 yard pass from Kessler (Heidari kick)	USC 14–10
Q2	:00	USC	Rogers 48 yard pass from Kessler (Heidari kick0	USC 21–10
Q4	14:29	USC	Allen 17 yard run (Heidari kick)	USC 28–10
Q4	5:02	USC	Davis 21 yard run (Heidari kick)	USC 35–10

=== Arizona State ===
Team	1	2	3	4	Total
• Arizona St	0	15	3	20	38
USC	7	10	3	14	34

- Date: October 4
- Location: Los Angeles Memorial Coliseum
- Game start: 7:30 p.m. EST
- Television network: Fox

Scoring summary
Q1	9:46	USC	Agholor 53 yard punt return (Heidari kick)	USC 7–0
Q2	11:41	ASU	Strong 4 yard pass from Bercovici (Garoutte kick)	Tie 7–7
Q2	7:23	ASU	Strong 77 yard pass from Bercovici (Kohl pass from Bercovici)	ASU 15–7
Q2	2:49	USC	Allen 1 yard run (Heidari kick)	ASU 15–14
Q2	:14	USC	Heidari 35 yard field goal	USC 17–15
Q3	8:23	ASU	Garoutte 19 yard field goal	ASU 18–17
Q3	3:45	USC	Heidari 33 yard field goal	USC 20–18
Q4	13:42	USC	Kessler 8 yard run (Heidari kick)	USC 27–18
Q4	3:53	ASU	Foster 21 yard pass from Bercovici (Garoutte kick)	USC 27–25
Q4	3:02	USC	Allen 53 yard run (Heidari kick)	USC 34–25
Q4	2:43	ASU	Smith 73 yard pass from Bercovici (Garoutte kick)	USC 34–32
Q4	:00	ASU	Strong 46 yard pass from Bercovici	ASU 38–34

=== Arizona ===
Team	1	2	3	4	Total
• USC	7	7	14	0	28
Arizona	6	0	7	13	26

- Date: October 11
- Location: Arizona Stadium
- Game start: 10:30 p.m. EST
- Television network: ESPN2

Scoring summary
Q1	8:21	ARIZ	Skowron 21 yard field goal	ARIZ 3–0
Q1	6:03	USC	Allen 34 yard run (Wood kick)	USC 7–3
Q1	:42	ARIZ	Skowron 25 yard field goal	USC 7–6
Q2	10:30	USC	Allen 48 yard run (Wood kick)	USC 14–6
Q3	9:17	USC	Agholor 21 yard pass from Kessler (Wood kick)	USC 21–6
Q3	6:05	ARIZ	Baker 6 yard run (Skowron kick)	USC 21–13
Q3	:35	USC	Allen 1 yard run (Wood kick)	USC 28–13
Q4	10:19	ARIZ	Baker 41 yard pass from Solomon (Skowron kick)	USC 28–20
Q4	1:07	ARIZ	Baker 1 yard run (run failed)	USC 28–26

=== Colorado ===
Team	1	2	3	4	Total
Colorado	0	7	14	7	28
• USC	28	7	21	0	56

- Date: October 18
- Location: Los Angeles Memorial Coliseum
- Game start: 6:00 p.m. EST
- Television network: P12N

Scoring summary
Q1	10:47	USC	Agholor 16 yard pass from Kessler (Wood kick)	USC 7–0
Q1	8:12	USC	Agholor 18 yard pass from Kessler (Wood kick)	USC 14–0
Q1	2:09	USC	Smith 7 yard pass from Kessler (Wood kick)	USC 21–0
Q1	1:16	USC	Dixon 15 yard pass from Kessler (Wood kick)	USC 28–0
Q2	10:06	COL	Adkins 11 yard run (Oliver kick)	USC 28–7
Q2	5:32	USC	Dixon 9 yard pass from Kessler (Wood kick)	USC 35–7
Q3	12:35	USC	Agholor 75 yard pass from Kessler (Wood kick)	USC 42–7
Q3	7:31	COL	Fields 2 yard pass from Liufau (Oliver kick)	USC 42–14
Q3	6:30	USC	Mitchell 24 yard pass from Kessler (Wood kick)	USC 49–14
Q3	3:15	COL	Spruce 5 yard pass from Liufau (Oliver kick)	USC 49–21
Q3	:11	USC	Allen 39 yard run (Wood kick)	USC 56–21
Q4	8:19	COL	Gehrke 9 yard run (Oliver kick)	USC 56–28

- Cody Kessler 19/26, 319 Yds, 7 TD (school record)

=== Utah ===
Team	1	2	3	4	Total
USC	7	7	0	7	21
• Utah	7	3	7	7	24

- Date: October 25
- Location: Rice-Eccles Stadium
- Game start: 10:00 p.m. EST
- Television network: FS1

=== Washington State ===
Team	1	2	3	4	Total
• USC	14	10	13	7	44
Washington St	0	7	3	7	17

- Date: November 1
- Location: Martin Stadium
- Game start: 4:30 p.m. EST
- Television network: P12N

Scoring summary
Q1	12:13	USC	Agholor 65 yard punt return (Heidari kick)	USC 7–0
Q1	10:33	USC	Smith 22 yard pass from Kessler (Heidari kick)	USC 14–0
Q2	10:37	USC	Heidari 37 yard field goal	USC 17–0
Q2	6:13	USC	Smith 22 yard pass from Kessler (Heidari kick)	USC 24–0
Q2	1:33	WSU	Lewis 9 yard pass from Falk (Breshears kick)	USC 24–7
Q3	6:10	WSU	Breshears 27 yard field goal	USC 24–10
Q3	5:51	USC	Agholor 87 yard pass from Kessler (Heidari kick)	USC 31–10
Q3	1:33	USC	Smith 7 yard pass from Kessler (kick failed)	USC 37–10
Q4	12:18	USC	Mitchell 5 yard pass from Kessler (Heidari kick)	USC 44–10
Q4	5:30	WSU	Myers 12 yard pass from Falk (Breshears kick)	USC 44–17

=== California ===
Team	1	2	3	4	Total
California	2	7	7	14	30
• USC	21	10	0	7	38

- Date: November 13
- Location: Los Angeles Memorial Coliseum
- Game start: 9:00 p.m. EST
- Television network: ESPN

Scoring summary
Q1	9:55	USC	Agholor 10 yard pass from Kessler (Heidari kick)	USC 7–0
Q1	7:27	USC	Farmer 32 yard pass from Kessler (Heidari kick)	USC 14–0
Q1	5:31	CAL	Safety, Davis tackled in end zone	USC 14–2
Q1	3:05	USC	Davis 3 yard run (Heidari kick)	USC 21–2
Q2	7:33	USC	Agholor 9 yard pass from Kessler (Heidari kick)	USC 28–2
Q2	1:39	USC	Heidari 25 yard field goal	USC 31–2
Q2	:09	CAL	Harper 6 yard pass from Goff (Langford kick)	USC 31–9
Q3	3:40	CAL	Lasco 5 yard run (Langford kick)	USC 31–16
Q4	11:19	USC	Telfer 15 yard pass from Kessler (Heidari kick)	USC 38–16
Q4	6:36	CAL	Treggs 5 yard pass from Goff (Langford kick)	USC 38–23
Q4	1:36	CAL	Anderson 29 yard pass from Goff (Langford kick)	USC 38–30

=== UCLA ===
Team	1	2	3	4	Total
USC	7	7	0	6	20
• UCLA	14	10	14	0	38

- Date: November 22
- Location: Rose Bowl
- Game start: 8:00 p.m. EST
- Television network: ABC

=== Notre Dame ===
Team	1	2	3	4	Total
Notre Dame	0	7	7	0	14
• USC	21	14	14	0	49

- Date: November 29
- Location: Los Angeles Memorial Coliseum
- Game start: 3:30 p.m. EST
- Television network: Fox

Scoring summary
Q1	6:50	USC	Farmer 48 yard pass from Kessler (Heidari kick)	USC 7–0
Q1	3:36	USC	Jackson 16 yard pass from Hessler (Heidari kick)	USC 14–0
Q1	:43	USC	Farmer 31 yard pass from Kessler (Heidari kick)	USC 21–0
Q2	10:51	USC	Rogers 6 yard pass from Kessler (Heidari kick)	USC 28–0
Q2	5:15	USC	Agholor 14 yard pass from Kessler (Heidari kick)	USC 35–0
Q2	4:11	ND	Zaire 11 yard run (Brindza kick)	USC 35–7
Q3	11:19	USC	Telfer 9 yard pass from Kessler (Heidari kick)	USC 42–7
Q3	6:02	USC	Davis 16 yard run (Heidari kick)	USC 49–7
Q3	2:48	ND	Bryant 1 yard run (Brindza kick)	USC 49–14

- Cody Kessler 32/40, 372 Yds, 6 TD

=== Holiday Bowl ===
Team	1	2	3	4	Total
Nebraska	17	0	17	8	42
• USC	10	14	21	0	45

- Date: December 27
- Location: Qualcomm Stadium
- Game start: 8:00 p.m. EST
- Television network: ESPN

Scoring summary
Q1	11:05	NEB	Brown 34 yard field goal	NEB 3–0
Q1	10:54	USC	Jackson 98 yard kickoff return (Heidari kick)	USC 7–3
Q1	8:23	NEB	Bell 18 yard pass from Armstrong Jr. (Brown kick)	NEB 10–7
Q1	6:05	USC	Heidari 42 yard field goal	Tie 10–10
Q1	1:25	NEB	Pierson-El 9 yard pass from Armstrong (Brown kick)	NEB 17–10
Q2	13:11	USC	Agholor 17 yard pass from Kessler (Heidari kick)	Tie 17–17
Q2	6:39	USC	Allen 2 yard run (Heidari kick)	USC 24–17
Q3	12:01	USC	Jackson 71 yard pass from Kessler (Heidari kick)	USC 31–17
Q3	9:41	NEB	Abdullah 20 yard run (Brown kick)	USC 31–24
Q3	8:06	USC	Allen 44 yard run (Heidari kick)	USC 38–24
Q3	2:28	NEB	Brown 24 yard field goal	USC 38–27
Q3	2:03	USC	Dixon 20 yard pass from Kessler (Heidari kick)	USC 45–27
Q3	:24	NEB	Westerkamp 65 yard pass from Armstrong Jr. (Brown kick)	USC 45–34
Q4	6:52	NEB	Armstrong Jr. 15 yard run (Bell pass from Armstrong Jr.)	USC 45–42

== Rankings ==
Ranking movements Legend: ██ Increase in ranking ██ Decrease in ranking — = Not ranked RV = Received votes
	Week																
Poll	Pre	1	2	3	4	5	6	7	8	9	10	11	12	13	14	15	Final
AP	15	14	9	17	18	16	RV	22	20	RV	RV	RV	24	RV	RV	24	20
Coaches	15	14	10	21	22	20	RV	25	21	RV	RV	RV	24	RV	RV	RV	21
CFP	Not released									—	—	—	19	—	25	24	Not released

== Notes ==
- December 27, 2014 – After winning the Holiday Bowl game, Cody Kessler announced he will return next season for his senior year.
