= Adoree' Jackson =

American football player (born 1995)

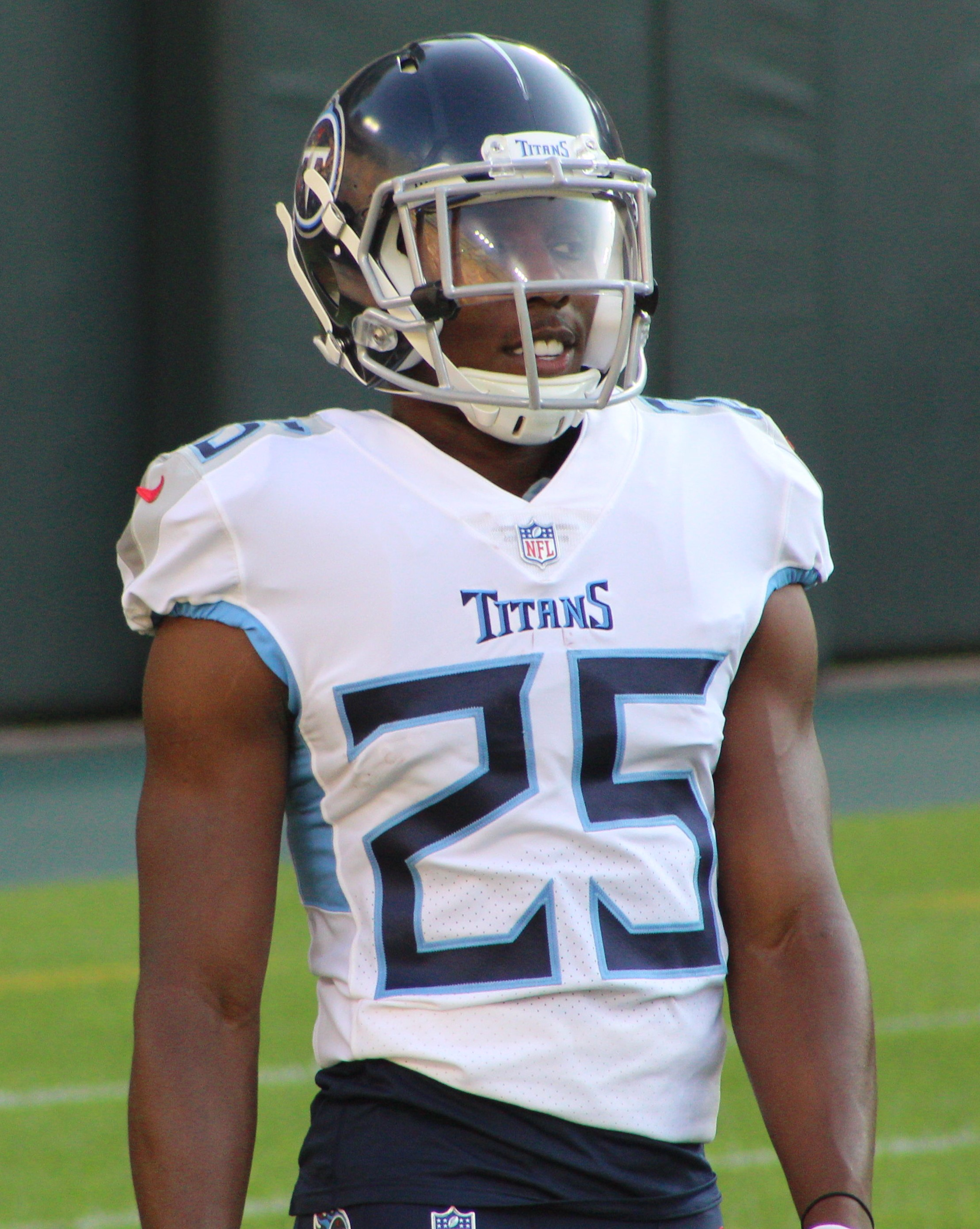
- Jackson with the Tennessee Titans in 2018

Profile
- Position: Cornerback

Personal information
- Born: September 18, 1995 (age 31); Belleville, Illinois, U.S.
- Listed height: 5 ft 11 in (1.80 m)
- Listed weight: 185 lb (84 kg)

Career information
- High school: Junípero Serra (Gardena, California)
- College: USC (2014–2016)
- NFL draft: 2017: 1st round, 18th overall pick

Career history
- Tennessee Titans (2017–2020); New York Giants (2021–2024); Philadelphia Eagles (2025)

Awards and highlights
- Jim Thorpe Award (2016); Jet Award (2016); Unanimous All-American (2016); Pac-12 Defensive Player of the Year (2016); 2× First-team All-Pac-12 (2015, 2016); Pac-12 Defensive Freshman of the Year (2014)

Career NFL statistics as of 2025
- Total tackles: 459
- Forced fumbles: 6
- Fumble recoveries: 5
- Pass deflections: 72
- Interceptions: 5
- Return yards: 1,070
- Total touchdowns: 1
- Stats at Pro Football Reference

Adoree' K. Jackson (born September 18, 1995) is an American professional football cornerback and return specialist. He played college football for the USC Trojans, earning consensus All-American honors and winning the Jim Thorpe Award and the Jet Award during his junior season in 2016. He was selected by the Tennessee Titans in the first round of the 2017 NFL draft. Jackson spent four seasons with the Titans before signing with the Giants in 2021.

== Early life ==
Jackson was born on September 18, 1995, in Belleville, Illinois. During his freshman year in high school, he attended Belleville East High School. He moved to California prior to his sophomore year in high school. Jackson attended Junípero Serra High School in Gardena, California. He played numerous positions including wide receiver, running back, defensive back, and return specialist. Jackson was rated by Rivals.com as a five-star recruit and was ranked as the number one athlete and sixth best player overall in his class. He committed to the University of Southern California (USC) to play college football. Jackson also played basketball and ran track and field in high school.

== College career ==
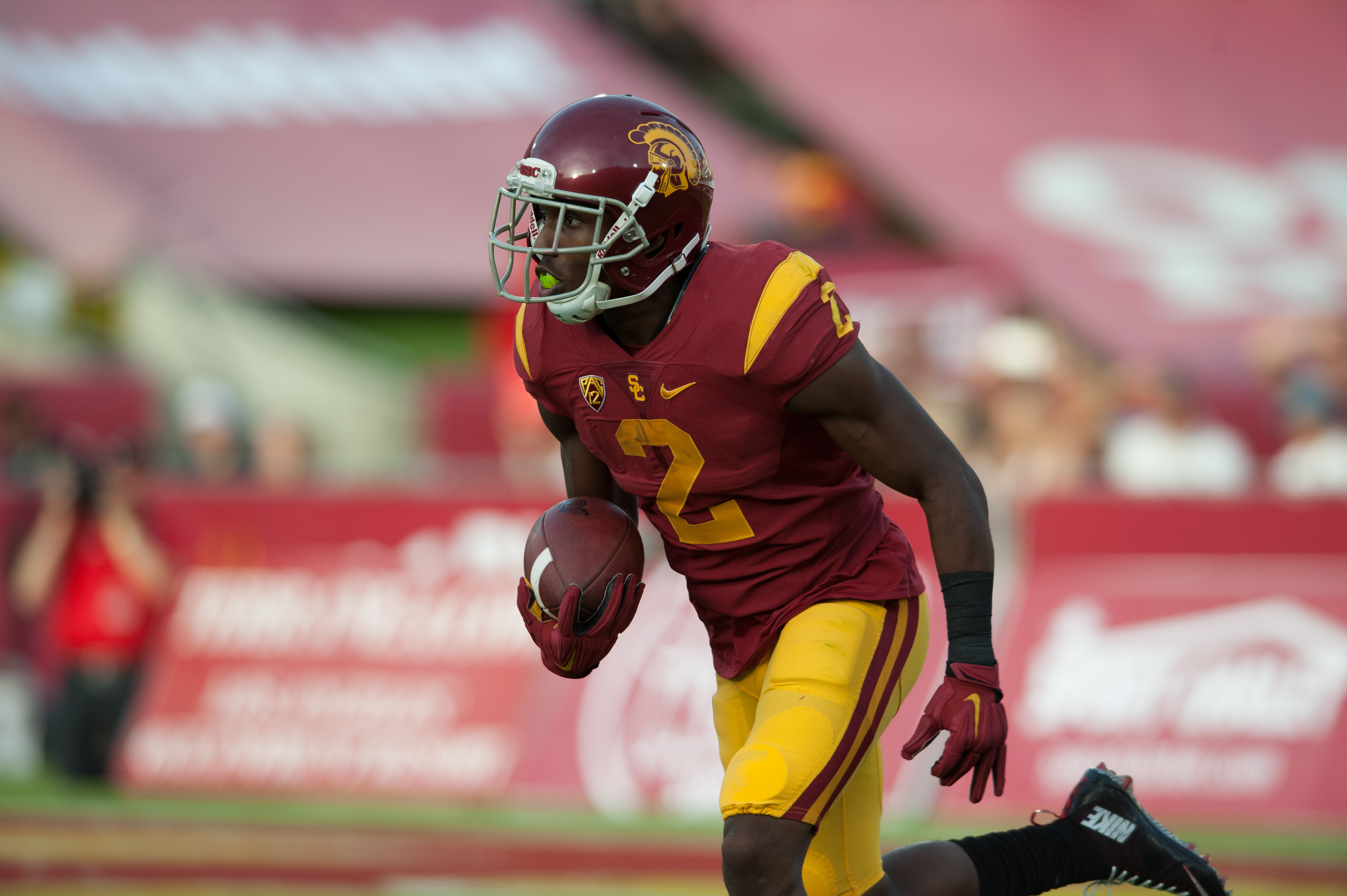
Jackson playing for USC in 2015.

Jackson majored in communications with a real estate minor at USC. Jackson played in 12 games as a true freshman in 2014. He played cornerback, wide receiver, and return specialist. He was the Pac-12 Conference Freshman of the Year. In the 2014 Holiday Bowl, he had a 98-yard kickoff return touchdown and a 71-yard touchdown reception in USC's 45–42 win. He finished his freshman season with 50 tackles, three receiving touchdowns, and two return touchdowns.

Jackson was named a Freshman All-American by Football Writers Association of America and Pac-12 Defensive Freshman of the Year by the Pac-12 coaches.

In the 2015 season, Jackson finished with 27 receptions for 414 receiving yards and two receiving touchdowns. In addition, he recorded two punt return touchdowns and one interception return for a touchdown.

Jackson placed fifth in the long jump (almost 26 feet) and 4th in the 4×100 meters 2015 NCAA outdoor track and field championship earning two All-American awards. He also won the 2015 Pac-12 Conference Championship long jump.

On November 12, 2016, Jackson intercepted two passes from Washington's quarterback Jake Browning, helping the Trojans win their fifth straight game and upset the fourth-ranked Huskies, who were undefeated at the time.

On December 8, 2016, Jackson was awarded the 2016 Jim Thorpe Award as the nation's top defensive back.

On January 16, 2017, Jackson announced he would forgo his senior season and enter the 2017 NFL draft.

== Professional career ==
=== Pre-draft ===
On March 22, 2017, Jackson participated at USC's Pro Day. He ran positional drills and completed the three-cone drill, while also meeting with team representatives and scouts from all 32 NFL teams. Jackson was ranked the tenth best cornerback in the draft by Sports Illustrated, ranked the seventh best cornerback by ESPN, ranked the sixth best by NFLDraftScout.com, was ranked the fifth best cornerback by NFL analyst Mike Mayock, and was ranked the second best cornerback by NFL analyst Bucky Brooks.

Pre-draft measurables
Height	Weight	Arm length	Hand span	Wingspan	40-yard dash	10-yard split	20-yard split	Three-cone drill	Vertical jump	Broad jump
5 ft 10 in (1.78 m)	186 lb (84 kg)	31 3/8 in (0.80 m)	9 1/4 in (0.23 m)	6 ft 2 in (1.88 m)	4.42 s	1.52 s	2.56 s	6.63 s	36.0 in (0.91 m)	10 ft 2 in (3.10 m)
All values from NFL Combine/USC's Pro Day

=== Tennessee Titans ===
==== 2017 season ====
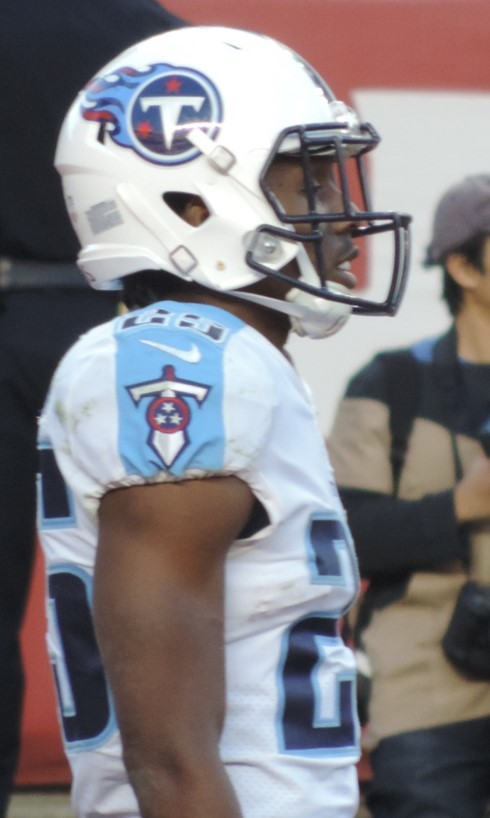
Jackson in 2017

The Tennessee Titans selected Jackson in the first round (18th overall) of the 2017 NFL draft.

On May 23, 2017, the Titans signed Jackson to a fully guaranteed four-year, $11.28 million contract that also includes a signing bonus of $6.34 million. He competed with Logan Ryan, LeShaun Sims, Brice McCain, and Kalan Reed throughout training camp for the vacant starting cornerback positions after the departure of Jason McCourty and Perrish Cox during the off season. Head coach Mike Mularkey named him the starting cornerback, opposite Logan Ryan, and punt returner to begin the regular season.

Jackson made his NFL debut in the season-opener against the Oakland Raiders. He recorded four solo tackles, two pass deflections, and 40 return yards in a 16–26 loss. In the next game against the Jacksonville Jaguars, Jackson recorded three solo tackles and returned two punts for 55 yards in a 37–16 road victory. The following week, he collected five combined tackles, defended two passes, and returned five punts for a total of 51 yards in a 33–27 victory over the Seattle Seahawks. During Week 9, Jackson recorded eight combined tackles, deflected a pass, and had his first NFL carry for a 20-yard gain in a 23–20 win over the Baltimore Ravens. In the next game against the Cincinnati Bengals, he had two tackles and two pass deflections along with 30 rushing yards as the Titans won by a score of 24–20. The following week, Jackson had 11 tackles, two pass deflections, and a forced fumble along with five rushing yards in a 40–17 road loss to the Pittsburgh Steelers. In the regular-season finale against the Jaguars, he had five tackles, two pass deflections, and a forced fumble in a 15–10 victory.

Jackson finished his rookie season with 70 tackles, three forced fumbles, 17 pass deflections, 868 return yards, and 55 rushing yards.

The Titans finished second in the AFC South with a 9–7 record and made the playoffs as a Wild Card team. In the Wild Card Round against the Kansas City Chiefs, Jackson had four tackles and 61 return yards in the narrow 22–21 road victory. In the Divisional Round against the New England Patriots, he had three tackles and 83 return yards in the 35–14 road loss.

==== 2018 season ====
During Week 2 against the Houston Texans, Jackson recorded his first NFL interception by picking off Deshaun Watson. He finished the 20–17 victory with 6 tackles, two pass deflections, and an interception. Three weeks later, he recorded his second interception by picking off Josh Allen in the narrow 13–12 road loss. The Titans finished the 2018 season with a 9–7 record and barely missed out on the playoffs.

Jackson finished his second season with 73 tackles, 10 pass deflections, and two interceptions.

==== 2019 season ====
In the season-opener against the Cleveland Browns, Jackson recorded five tackles in a 43–13 win. He missed the final four games of the regular season with a foot injury, but returned and started all three playoff games before the Titans were eliminated in the AFC Championship.

==== 2020 season ====
On May 1, 2020, the Titans exercised the fifth-year option on Jackson's contract. He was placed on injured reserve on September 14, 2020, with a knee injury. He was activated on November 11, 2020.

Jackson was released by the Titans on March 16, 2021.

=== New York Giants ===
On March 23, 2021, Jackson signed a three-year, $39 million contract with the New York Giants. He finished the season with 62 tackles, eight passes defended, and one interception.

In Week 11 of the 2022 season in a loss against the Detroit Lions, Jackson suffered an MCL sprain. He finished the season with 51 tackles, one forced fumble, two fumble recoveries, and seven passes defended.

In Week 16 of the 2023 season against the Philadelphia Eagles, Jackson recorded his first career Pick 6 on pass thrown by Jalen Hurts taking it 76 yards for a touchdown. In the 2023 season, he appeared in 14 games. He finished with 63 tackles, one interception, eight passes defended, and one forced fumble.

The Giants re-signed Jackson to a one year deal on September 1, 2024. He finished the 2024 season with 28 total tackles (18 solo), five passes defended, one forced fumble, and one fumble recovery.

=== Philadelphia Eagles ===
On March 13, 2025, Jackson signed a one-year, $5 million contract with the Philadelphia Eagles. He finished the 2025 season with 55 total tackles (40 solo), one interception, and 11 passes defended.

== Career statistics ==
Legend
	Led the league
**Bold**	Career high

=== NFL ===
==== Regular season ====
===== Defense =====
Year	Team	Games		Tackles				Interceptions					Fumbles	
Year	Team	GP	GS	Cmb	Solo	Ast	Sck	Int	Yds	Avg	TD	PD	FF	FR
2017	TEN	**16**	**16**	70	61	9	0.0	0	0	0.0	0	**17**	**3**	0
2018	TEN	**16**	13	**73**	**67**	6	0.0	**2**	7	3.5	0	10	0	**2**
2019	TEN	11	10	45	39	6	0.0	0	0	0.0	0	6	0	0
2020	TEN	3	2	12	9	3	0.0	0	0	0.0	0	0	0	0
2021	NYG	13	12	62	47	**15**	0.0	1	10	10.0	0	8	0	0
2022	NYG	10	10	51	40	11	0.0	0	0	0.0	0	7	1	**2**
2023	NYG	14	14	63	49	14	0.0	1	**76**	**76.0**	**1**	8	1	0
2024	NYG	14	5	28	18	10	0.0	0	0	0.0	0	5	1	1
2025	PHI	14	10	55	40	15	0.0	1	1	1.0	0	11	0	0
Career		111	92	459	370	89	0.0	5	94	18.8	1	72	6	5

===== Offense / special teams =====
Year	Team	Receiving				Rushing				Kick return				Punt return			
Year	Team	Rec	Yds	Avg	TD	Att	Yds	Avg	TD	Ret	Yds	Avg	TD	Ret	Yds	Avg	TD
2017	TEN	0	0	0	0	**5**	**55**	**11.0**	0	**25**	**578**	**23.1**	0	**34**	**290**	8.5	0
2018	TEN	0	0	0	0	0	0	0.0	0	0	0	0.0	0	16	148	**9.3**	0
2019	TEN	0	0	0	0	0	0	0.0	0	2	23	11.5	0	3	26	8.7	0
2022	NYG	0	0	0	0	0	0	0.0	0	0	0	0.0	0	3	5	1.7	0
Career		0	0	0	0	5	55	11.0	0	27	601	22.3	0	56	469	8.4	0

==== Postseason ====
===== Defense =====
Year	Team	Games		Tackles				Interceptions					Fumbles	
Year	Team	GP	GS	Cmb	Solo	Ast	Sck	Int	Yds	Avg	TD	PD	FF	FR
2017	TEN	2	2	7	6	1	0.0	0	0	0.0	0	0	0	0
2019	TEN	**3**	**3**	9	8	1	0.0	0	0	0.0	0	**5**	0	0
2020	TEN	1	1	8	8	0	0.0	0	0	0.0	0	0	0	0
2022	NYG	2	2	**14**	**11**	**3**	0.0	0	0	0.0	0	0	0	0
2025	PHI	1	1	4	4	0	0.0	0	0	0.0	0	0	0	0
Career		9	9	42	37	5	0.0	0	0	0.0	0	5	0	0

===== Offense / special teams =====
Year	Team	Receiving				Rushing				Kick return				Punt return			
Year	Team	Rec	Yds	Avg	TD	Att	Yds	Avg	TD	Ret	Yds	Avg	TD	Ret	Yds	Avg	TD
2017	TEN	0	0	0.0	0	0	0	0.0	0	**6**	**126**	**21.0**	0	**4**	**18**	**4.5**	0
2019	TEN	0	0	0.0	0	0	0	0.0	0	0	0	0.0	0	0	0	0.0	0
2020	TEN	0	0	0.0	0	0	0	0.0	0	0	0	0.0	0	0	0	0.0	0
Career		0	0	0.0	0	0	0	0.0	0	6	126	21.0	0	4	18	4.5	0

=== College ===
Defense

Year	Team	Games		Tackles					Interceptions						Fumbles		
Year	Team	GP	GS	Solo	Ast	Cmb	TfL	Sck	Int	Yds	Avg	TD	BU	PD	FF	FR	Yds
2014	USC	13	10	45	4	49	4.0	0	0	0	0	0	10	10	1	1	0
2015	USC	14	14	22	13	35	0.0	0	1	46	46.0	1	8	9	1	0	0
2016	USC	12	12	42	9	55	2.0	0	5	0	0.0	0	11	15	0	2	26
Career		39	36	109	26	135	6.0	0	6	46	7.7	1	29	34	2	3	26

Offense / special teams

Year	Team	Receiving				Rushing				Kick return				Punt return			
Year	Team	Rec	Yds	Avg	TD	Att	Yds	Avg	TD	Ret	Yds	Avg	TD	Ret	Yds	Avg	TD
2014	USC	10	138	13.8	3	1	5	5.0	0	23	684	29.7	2	2	12	6.0	0
2015	USC	27	414	15.3	2	7	36	5.1	0	30	690	23.0	0	24	251	10.5	2
2016	USC	1	52	52.0	1	5	49	9.8	0	22	671	30.5	2	19	302	15.9	2
Career		38	604	15.9	6	13	90	6.9	0	75	2,045	27.2	4	45	565	12.6	4

== Personal life ==
Jackson is a Christian. Jackson's mom, Vianca Jackson, is a breast cancer survivor. She was honored as the 12th Titan prior to a 2017 home game against the Indianapolis Colts. Lamar Jackson is his first cousin once removed.
