= George Farmer (running back) =

American football player (born 1993)

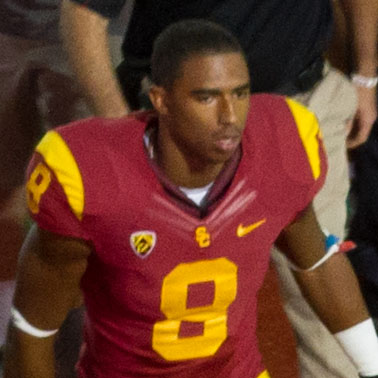
- Farmer with the USC Trojans in 2012

No. 39
- Position: Running back

Personal information
- Born: July 4, 1993 (age 33); Los Angeles, California, U.S.
- Listed height: 6 ft 1 in (1.85 m)
- Listed weight: 220 lb (100 kg)

Career information
- High school: Junípero Serra (Gardena, California)
- College: USC
- NFL draft: 2015: undrafted

Career history
- Dallas Cowboys (2015)*; Seattle Seahawks (2015–2016)
- * Offseason or practice squad member only

Career NFL statistics
- Receptions: 1
- Receiving yards: 4
- Stats at Pro Football Reference

George Farmer (born July 4, 1993) is an American former professional football player who was a running back in the National Football League (NFL). He graduated in 2011 from Junípero Serra High School in Gardena, California, and played college football for the USC Trojans.

== Early life ==
Farmer was regarded as a five-star recruit by Rivals.com, and was listed as the No. 1 wide receiver prospect in the class of 2011. He has been featured as Sports Illustrated′s "High School Player of the Week" in October 2010, and participated in the 2010 U.S. Army All-American Bowl.

At Junípero Serra High School, Farmer was a teammate of Colorado wideout and future Seahawks teammate Paul Richardson and San Jose Spartan cornerback Bené Benwikere as well as former USC Trojan wideouts Robert Woods and Marqise Lee.

Farmer is the son of former NFL player George Farmer, who played for both the Los Angeles Rams and Miami Dolphins in the 1980s.

=== Track and field ===
Also a competition sprinter, Farmer finished second in the 100 meters to Remontay McClain—in a photo finish (both at 10.40 sec)—at the 2010 CIF track meet.

==== Personal bests ====
Event	Time (seconds)	Venue	Date
100 meters	10.40	Clovis, California	June 4, 2010
200 meters	21.22	Clovis, California	June 4, 2010

== College career ==
Farmer played at USC as a freshman in the 2011 season, appearing in 4 games mostly as a running back, while catching 4 passes for 42 yards and returning 3 kickoffs for a total of 59 yards.

The next year, he suffered a serious bite from a brown recluse spider, before the start of the summer workouts. He was used even more sparingly in his sophomore season, recording only 1 reception for 7 yards.

Farmer tore his ACL and MCL in a preseason practice, causing him to miss the entire season. Despite only grabbing 30 catches for 363 yards with four touchdowns in an injury-plagued USC Trojan career, Farmer decided to enter the 2015 NFL draft after his junior year.

== Professional career ==
=== Dallas Cowboys ===
Farmer was signed as an undrafted free agent by the Dallas Cowboys on May 5, 2015. With several suitors, the Cowboys gave him a $15,000 signing bonus and a guaranteed cash payment of $55,000 for the season, to outbid other National Football League teams. He was waived on August 16 to make room for wide receiver David Porter.

=== Seattle Seahawks ===
On August 22, 2015, Farmer signed with the Seattle Seahawks as a free agent, who converted him to a cornerback. He was subsequently released on August 31. After being released at the conclusion of the preseason, the Seattle Seahawks resigned Farmer to their practice squad on September 22, 2015.

In the 2016 offseason, the Seahawks moved Farmer from cornerback to running back due to many injuries to their running backs. On August 30, 2016, he was waived/injured by the Seahawks and placed on injured reserve. On September 3, 2016, he was released from the Seahawks' injured reserve. He was re-signed to the practice squad on November 1, 2016 but was released on November 4. He was again re-signed to the practice squad the following week. He was promoted to the active roster on November 23, 2016. He was released on December 6, 2016 and re-signed back to the practice squad. He signed a reserve/future contract with the Seahawks on January 16, 2017. On May 9, 2017, he was released by the Seahawks.
