= Leonard Williams =

American football player (born 1994)

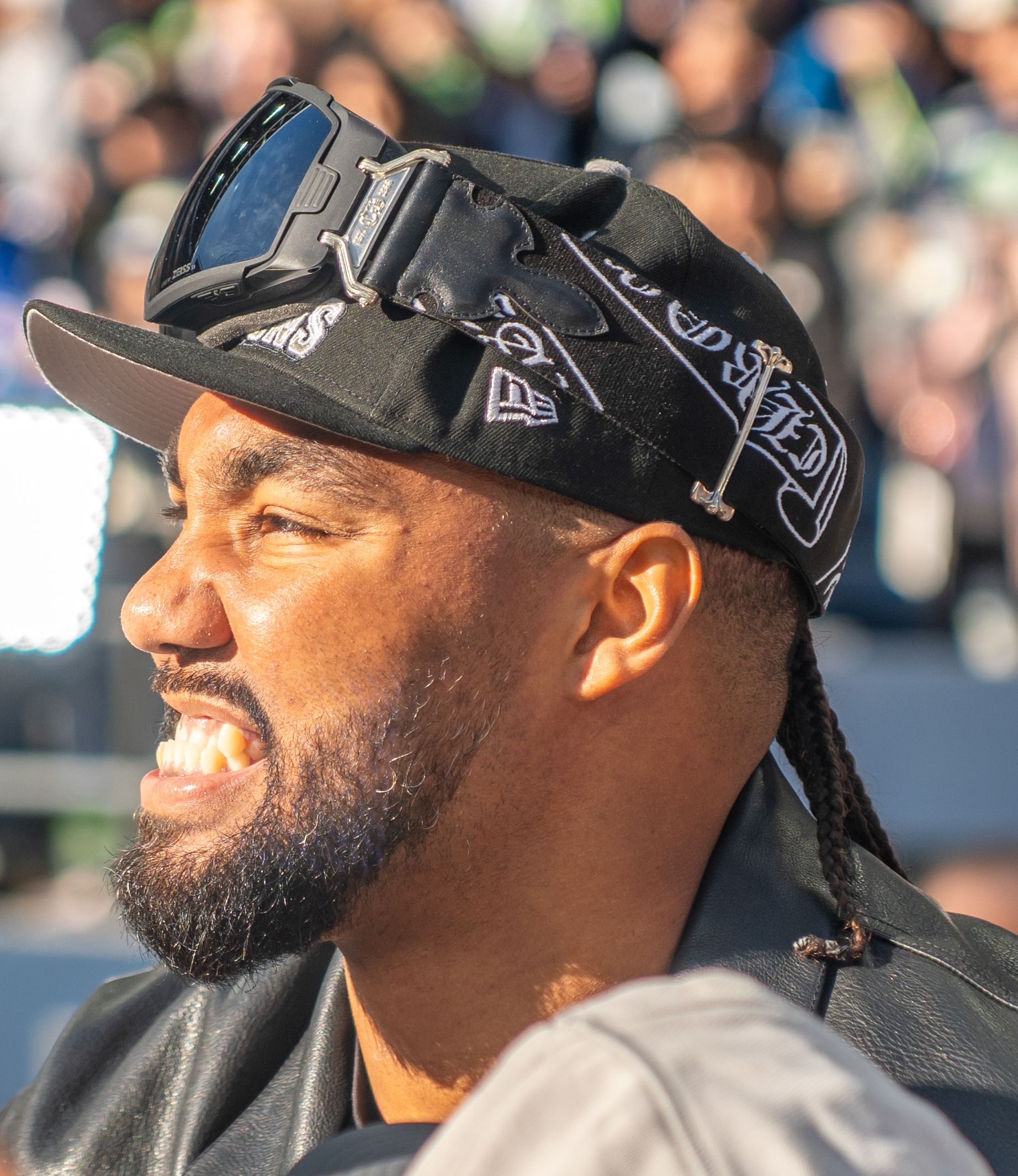
- Williams in 2026

No. 99 – Seattle Seahawks
- Position: Defensive tackle
- Roster status: Active

Personal information
- Born: June 20, 1994 (age 32); Bakersfield, California, U.S.
- Listed height: 6 ft 5 in (1.96 m)
- Listed weight: 310 lb (141 kg)

Career information
- High school: Mainland (Daytona Beach, Florida)
- College: USC (2012–2014)
- NFL draft: 2015: 1st round, 6th overall pick

Career history
- New York Jets (2015–2019); New York Giants (2019–2023); Seattle Seahawks (2023–present)

Awards and highlights
- Super Bowl champion (LX); Second-team All-Pro (2025); 3× Pro Bowl (2016, 2024, 2025); PFWA All-Rookie Team (2015); 2× first-team All-American (2013, 2014); 2× first-team All-Pac-12 (2013, 2014); Pac-12 Defensive Freshman of the Year (2012)

Career NFL statistics as of Week 9, 2026
- Tackles: 662
- Sacks: 64.5
- Forced fumbles: 6
- Fumble recoveries: 4
- Pass deflections: 16
- Interceptions: 2
- Defensive touchdowns: 1
- Stats at Pro Football Reference

Leonard Austin Williams (born June 20, 1994) is an American professional football defensive tackle for the Seattle Seahawks of the National Football League (NFL). Nicknamed "Big Cat", he played college football for the USC Trojans and was selected by the New York Jets with the sixth overall pick in the first round of the 2015 NFL draft.

== Early life ==
Leonard Williams is the son of Aviva Russek (a nurse) and Clenon Williams (who programmed Computer Numerical Controllers as a machinist), and his maternal grandmother was Heidi Wisotsky. He was born in Bakersfield, California, but lived in Sacramento, California, Michigan, and Arizona before finishing grade school.

Williams then lived in Daytona Beach, Florida, and attended Mainland High School there, where he was a two-sport athlete in football and track. As a senior, he had 103 tackles and 10.5 sacks, helping Mainland to reach the FHSAA 6A state semi-finals, where they lost to Miami Central 7–17. However, the loss was overturned in August 2012 as Miami Central forfeited its entire season due to a transfer infraction.

Considered a four-star recruit by Rivals.com, Williams was ranked as the fifth-best strongside defensive end recruit in his class.

== College career ==
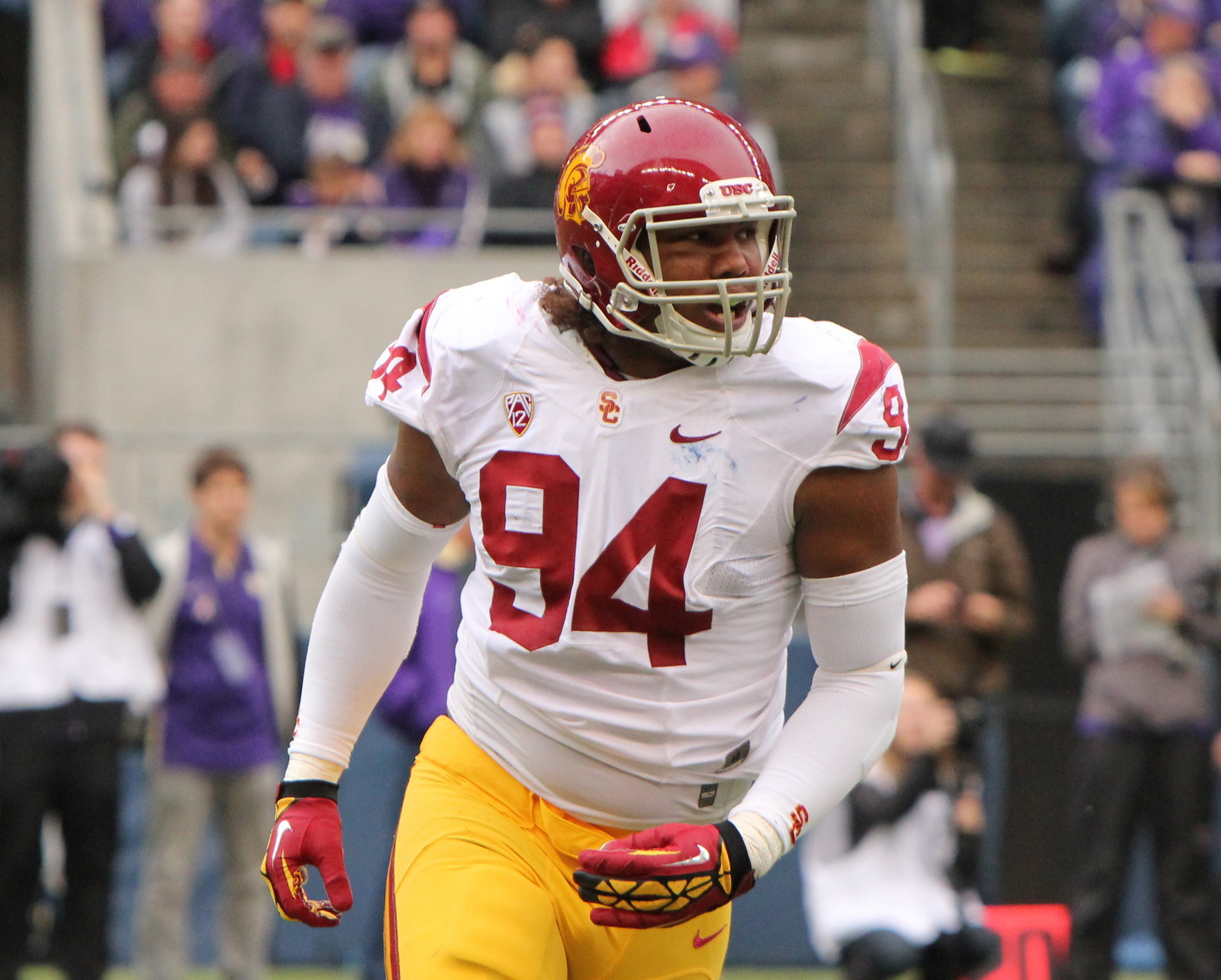
Williams playing for USC in 2012

As a true freshman in 2012, Williams started nine of 13 games at defensive tackle, recording 64 tackles, eight sacks and an interception. He was named the Pac-12 Conference Defensive Freshman of the Year. As a sophomore in 2013, Williams was moved from tackle to defensive end. After recording 74 tackles and six sacks, Williams was a named a first-team All-Pac-12 Conference selection and was an All-American by ESPN. As a junior in 2014, he recorded 80 tackles and seven sacks. He was named Team MVP, first-team All-Pac-12 and was an All-American by the American Football Coaches Association (AFCA) and ESPN.

After his junior season, Williams announced that he would forgo his senior year and enter the 2015 NFL draft.

== Professional career ==
=== Pre-draft ===
In May 2014, Williams was projected a top-4 selection in the 2015 NFL draft by various mock drafts. By October 2014, Williams was projected as a top-3 selection. In the months leading up to the draft Williams was regularly the 2nd pick in mock drafts, but in the final weeks some experts predicted that Marcus Mariota would instead be the 2nd pick, with Williams subsequently falling to 3–5th place.

Pre-draft measurables
Height	Weight	Arm length	Hand span	Wingspan	40-yard dash	10-yard split	20-yard split	20-yard shuttle	Three-cone drill	Vertical jump	Broad jump
6 ft 4 5/8 in (1.95 m)	302 lb (137 kg)	34 5/8 in (0.88 m)	10 5/8 in (0.27 m)	6 ft 10 5/8 in (2.10 m)	4.97 s	1.73 s	2.88 s	4.53 s	7.59 s	29.5 in (0.75 m)	8 ft 10 in (2.69 m)
All values from NFL Combine

=== New York Jets ===
Williams was selected by the New York Jets sixth overall in the first round of the 2015 NFL draft. He was the highest selected USC defensive lineman since Darrell Russell in 1997. Williams signed a four-year, $18.6 million contract on May 8, 2015. During his third preseason game against the interleague-rival New York Giants on August 29, 2015, Williams left the game with an apparent knee injury. X-Rays and MRIs were both negative, revealing no ligament damage. On September 7, 2015, he had his jersey number switched to #92 from #62. On his regular season debut against the Cleveland Browns on September 13, 2015, Williams made a total of five tackles. On the December 6, 2015, Williams recorded his first sack in a Giants–Jets rivalry game. In 16 games of his rookie year in 2015, Williams made 63 tackles with three sacks. He was named to the PFWA NFL All-Rookie Team for the 2015 season.

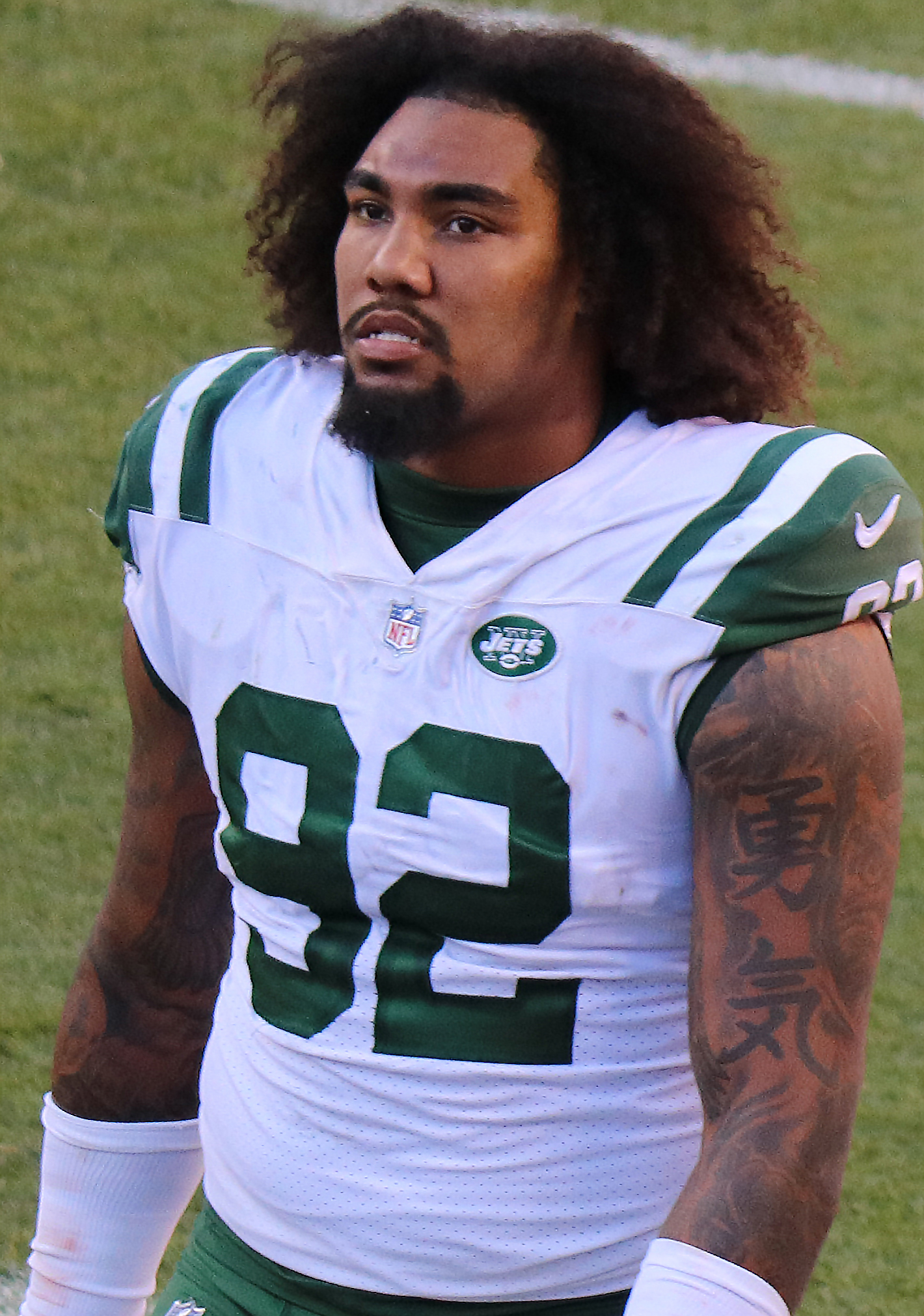
Williams playing for the New York Jets in 2017

Opening the season against the Cincinnati Bengals on September 11, 2016, Williams had 2.5 sacks for his first career multi-sack game. The Jets combined for 6 sacks, but still lost 23–22. He had a total of 7 sacks on the season, and as recognition for his great play, he was selected as a first-team alternate for the 2017 Pro Bowl.

In 2017, Williams started all 16 games, recording a career-low 47 tackles and two sacks.

On April 11, 2018, the Jets picked up the fifth-year option on Williams' contract. During Week 16 against the Green Bay Packers, he was disqualified for the first time in his NFL career after throwing a punch on Bryan Bulaga. This was one of 16 penalties as the Jets lost the game 44–38 in overtime. On December 29, Williams was fined $43,449, which also included a hit on Aaron Rodgers. In the 2018 season, he started in all 16 games. He finished with five sacks, 42 total tackles (27 solo), and two passes defended as the Jets went 4–12.

=== New York Giants ===
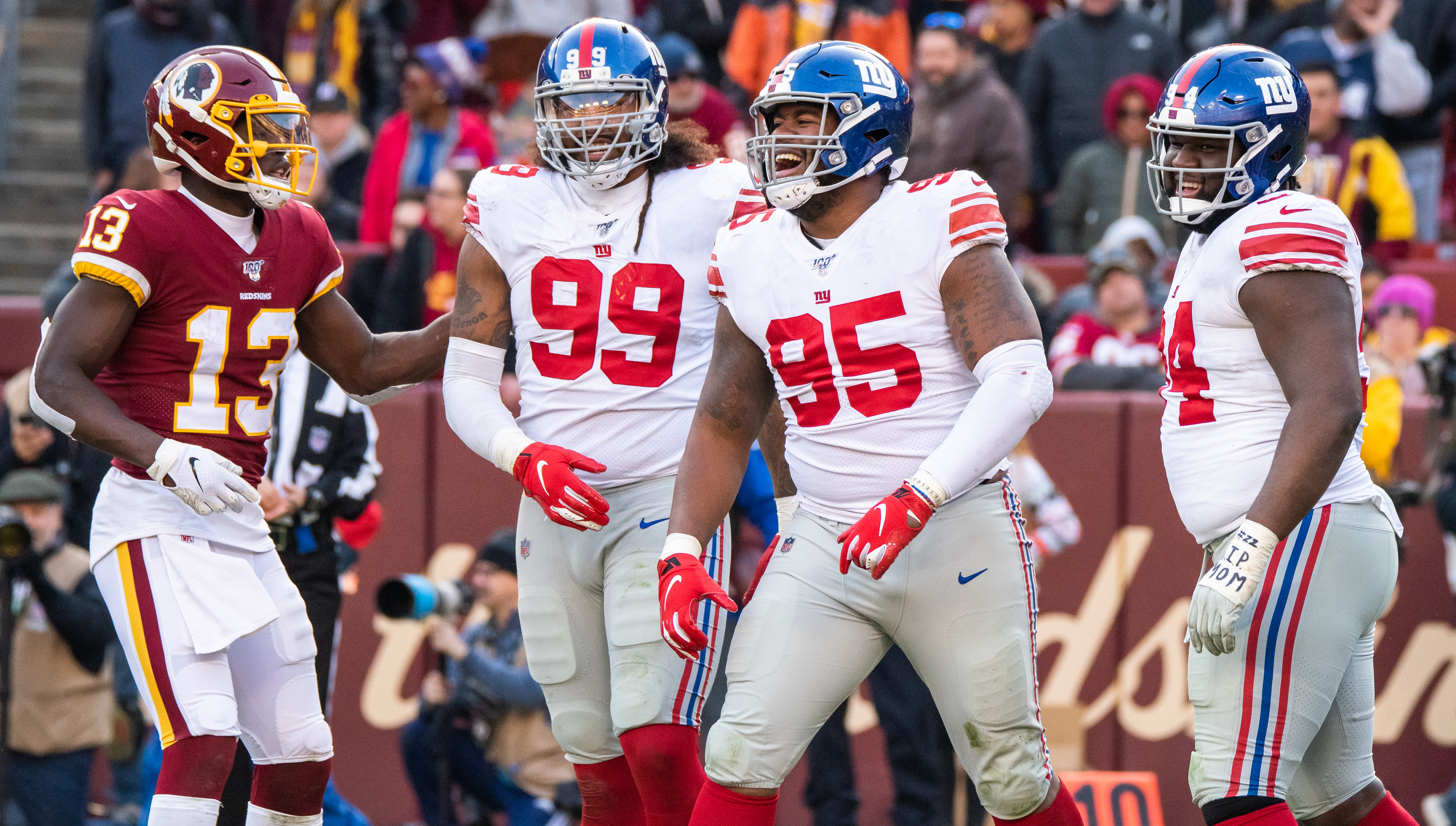
Williams (#99) in a game against the Washington Redskins in 2019

On October 28, 2019, Williams was traded to the New York Giants for a 2020 third round pick and a 2021 fifth round pick. In week 15 against the Miami Dolphins, Williams forced a fumble on former teammate Ryan Fitzpatrick which was recovered by teammate Sean Chandler during the 36–20 win. He finished the 2019 season with a half-sack, 46 total tackles (21 solo), three passes defended, and one forced fumble in 15 games and 12 starts.

On March 16, 2020, the Giants placed the franchise tag on Williams. He signed the one-year tender on April 22, 2020. He was placed on the active/non-football injury list at the start of training camp on August 2, 2020. He was activated on August 14, 2020. In Week 1 against the Pittsburgh Steelers on Monday Night Football, Williams recorded his first sack of the season on Ben Roethlisberger during the 26–16 loss. Williams' sack was his first full sack as a member of the Giants and surpassed his 2019 total of 0.5 sacks. In Week 13 against the Seattle Seahawks, Williams recorded 2.5 sacks on Russell Wilson during the 17–12 win. Williams was named the NFC Defensive Player of the Week for his performance in Week 13. In Week 17 against the Dallas Cowboys, Williams recorded three sacks on Andy Dalton during the 23–19 win. Williams won the NFC Defensive Player Of The Week Award again for his performance. This brought Williams' total to 11.5 sacks on the season. In the 2020 season, he finished with 11.5 sacks, 57 total tackles (29 solo), one pass defended, and one forced fumble. He was ranked 84th by his fellow players on the NFL Top 100 Players of 2021.

The Giants placed the franchise tag on Williams for the second consecutive season on March 9, 2021. On March 18, 2021, the Giants signed him to a three-year, $63 million contract that includes $45 million guaranteed and a signing bonus of $22.50 million. He started in all 17 games in the 2021 season. He finished with 6.5 sacks, 81 total tackles (34 solo), two passes defended, two forced fumbles, and one fumble recovery. He was ranked 97th by his fellow players on the NFL Top 100 Players of 2022.

On September 6, 2022, the Giants restructured Williams' contract to create more cap space. He sprained his MCL in Week 2 against the Carolina Panthers. He returned in Week 6 against the Ravens. He finished with 2.5 sacks, 45 total tackles (26 solo), one forced fumble, and two fumble recoveries in 12 games and starts.

=== Seattle Seahawks ===
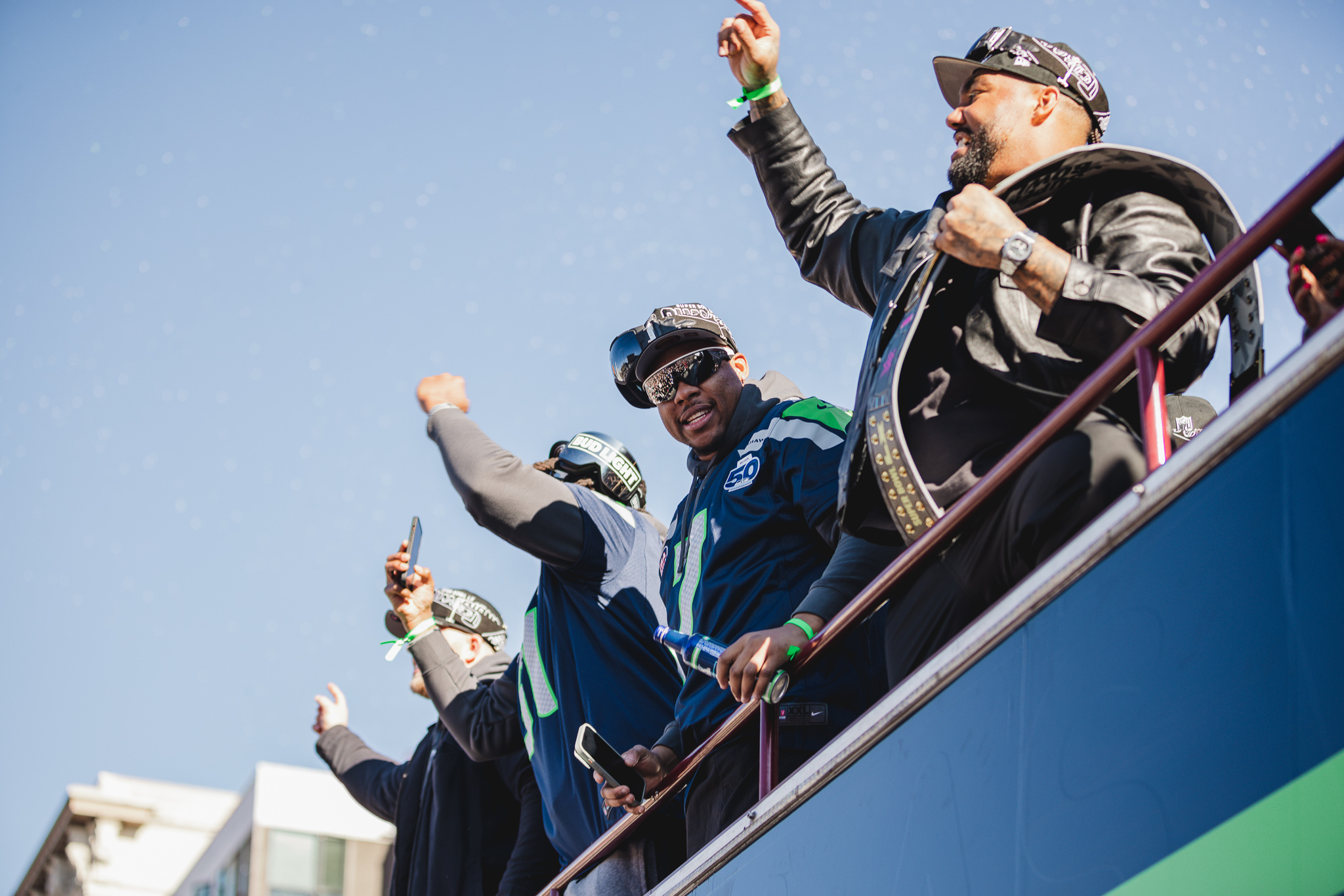
Williams (right) celebrating with teammates during the Super Bowl LX parade

On October 30, 2023, Williams was traded to the Seattle Seahawks in exchange for a second-round pick in the 2024 NFL draft (No. 47; later used on Tyler Nubin) and a fifth-round pick in the 2025 NFL draft. Due to the mid-season trade, he would miss out on having a bye week during the 2023 season and played in 18 regular season games, becoming the first player to do so since the 1930 NFL season. In the 2023 season, Williams finished with 5.5 sacks, 62 total tackles (37 solo), and two passes defended.

On March 12, 2024, Williams signed a three-year, $64.5 million contract extension with the Seahawks. On December 1, 2024, Williams scored his first NFL touchdown on a 92-yard interception return in the second quarter off Aaron Rodgers during a Week 13 game against his former team, the New York Jets. At 310 lbs, the return for a touchdown gave him the NFL record for the heaviest player ever to do so as the former Jet and Giant secured a signature career moment at MetLife Stadium. Following his impressive performance against the Jets, Williams was named NFC Player of the Week for the third time in his career. He was later named NFC Defensive Player Of The Month for December/January after recording six sacks and nine tackles during the timespan. He finished the 2024 season with 11 sacks, 64 tackles, one interception, and three passes defended. In that season, he made the Pro Bowl (replacing Jalen Carter) in which the NFC won.

Williams was ranked as the 99th best player in the league on the NFL Top 100 Players of 2025. He finished the 2025 season with seven sacks, 62 total tackles, and one pass defended. Williams played in Super Bowl LX, winning his first Super Bowl championship when the Seahawks defeated the New England Patriots 29–13.

On August 26, 2026, Williams and the Seahawks agreed to a three-year, $90 million contract extension, with $56 million guaranteed.

== Career statistics ==
Legend
	Won the Super Bowl
**Bold**	Career high

=== NFL ===
==== Regular season ====
Year	Team	Games		Tackles					Interceptions				Fumbles			
Year	Team	GP	GS	Cmb	Solo	Ast	Sck	TFL	Int	Yds	TD	PD	FF	FR	Yds	TD
2015	NYJ	16	15	63	29	34	3.0	7	0	0	0	0	0	0	0	0
2016	NYJ	16	16	68	36	32	7.0	11	0	0	0	0	**2**	0	0	0
2017	NYJ	16	16	47	22	25	2.0	3	**1**	6	0	1	0	0	0	0
2018	NYJ	16	16	42	27	15	5.0	11	0	0	0	2	0	0	0	0
2019	NYJ	7	7	20	8	12	0.0	0	0	0	0	1	0	0	0	0
2019	NYG	8	5	26	13	13	0.5	2	0	0	0	2	1	0	0	0
2020	NYG	16	12	57	29	28	**11.5**	14	0	0	0	1	0	1	0	0
2021	NYG	17	17	**81**	34	**47**	6.5	5	0	–	–	2	**2**	1	0	0
2022	NYG	12	12	45	26	19	2.5	5	0	0	0	0	1	**2**	0	0
2023	NYG	8	7	21	13	8	1.5	1	0	0	0	1	0	0	0	0
2023	SEA	10	10	41	24	17	4.0	9	0	0	0	1	0	0	0	0
2024	SEA	16	16	64	**37**	27	11.0	**16**	**1**	**92**	**1**	**3**	0	0	0	0
2025	SEA	17	17	62	33	29	7.0	9	0	0	0	1	0	0	0	0
2026	SEA	8	8	25	17	8	3.0	7	0	0	0	1	0	0	0	0
Career		183	174	662	348	314	64.5	100	2	98	1	16	6	4	0	0

==== Postseason ====
Year	Team	Games		Tackles					Interceptions				Fumbles			
Year	Team	GP	GS	Cmb	Solo	Ast	Sck	TFL	Int	Yds	TD	PD	FF	FR	Yds	TD
2022	NYG	2	2	**6**	**2**	**4**	0.0	0	0	–	–	**1**	0	0	–	–
2025	SEA	3	3	4	**2**	2	**1.0**	**1**	0	–	–	0	0	0	–	–
Career		5	5	10	4	6	1.0	1	0	0	0	1	0	0	0	0

=== College ===
Year	Team	GP	Tackles					Interceptions					Fumbles			
Year	Team	GP	Cmb	Solo	Ast	Sck	TFL	Int	Yds	Avg	TD	PD	FF	FR	Yds	TD
2012	USC	13	64	31	33	**8.0**	**13.5**	**1**	**24**	**24.0**	0	0	0	0	0	0
2013	USC	13	74	32	**42**	5.0	12.5	0	0	—	0	0	1	**1**	0	0
2014	USC	13	**80**	**48**	32	7.0	9.5	**1**	10	10.0	0	**3**	**3**	**1**	0	0
Career		39	218	111	107	20.0	35.5	2	34	17.0	0	3	4	2	0	0

== Personal life ==
Williams is a Christian. He is married to Hailey Louise Williams, daughter of Ronnie and Karen Lott. They are expecting their first child together. Williams is of Japanese descent through his father and Hispanic descent through his mother.

Williams is a fan of the trading card game Magic: The Gathering and has a collection worth over $1 million.
