= Javorius Allen =

American football player (born 1991)

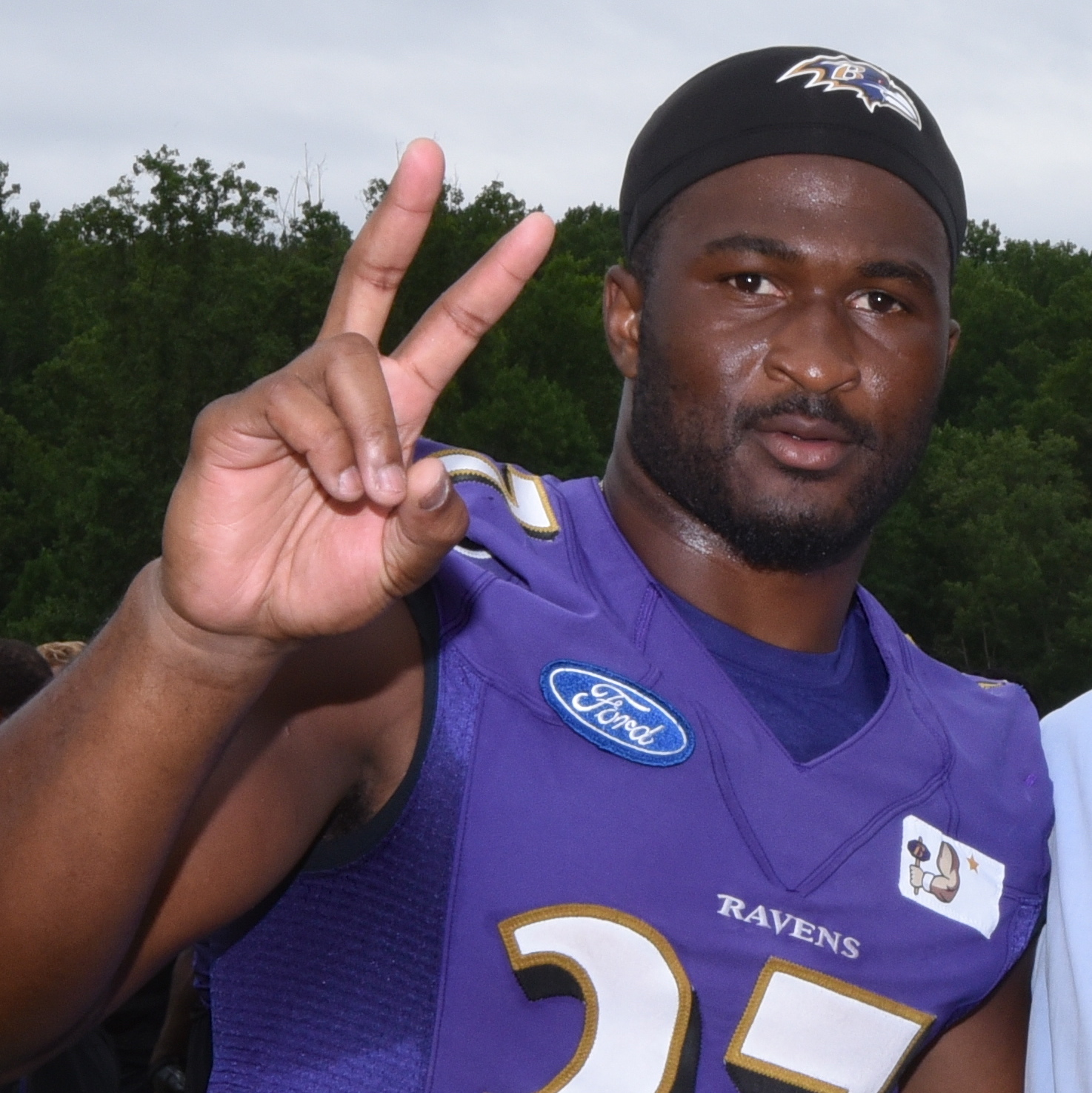
- Allen with the Baltimore Ravens in 2016

No. 37
- Position: Running back

Personal information
- Born: August 27, 1991 (age 35); Tallahassee, Florida, U.S.
- Listed height: 6 ft 0 in (1.83 m)
- Listed weight: 218 lb (99 kg)

Career information
- High school: Lincoln (Tallahassee)
- College: USC (2011–2014)
- NFL draft: 2015: 4th round, 125th overall pick

Career history
- Baltimore Ravens (2015–2018); New Orleans Saints (2019)*; New York Giants (2019)
- * Offseason or practice squad member only

Awards and highlights
- First-team All-Pac-12 (2014)

Career NFL statistics
- Rushing yards: 1,285
- Rushing average: 3.7
- Rushing touchdowns: 9
- Receptions: 130
- Receiving yards: 823
- Receiving touchdowns: 6
- Stats at Pro Football Reference

Javorius "Buck" Allen (born August 27, 1991), is an American former professional football player who was a running back in the National Football League (NFL). He was selected by the Baltimore Ravens in the fourth round of the 2015 NFL draft. He played college football for the USC Trojans.

== Early life ==
Allen attended Lincoln High School in Tallahassee, Florida, where he played football and ran track. As a sophomore in 2008, he rushed for 1,044 yards on 162 carries (6.4 avg.) with ten touchdowns. In 2009, he missed his junior season with an injury. As a senior, he rushed for more than 1,500 yards and was named Super Prep All-Dixie and Prep Star All-Southeast. He was ranked as a three-star recruit by Rivals.com and the 23rd best athlete. He committed to play college football at the University of Southern California (USC) in February 2011.

In addition, he lettered all four years in track & field. He ran a personal-best time of 11.32 seconds in the 100-meter dash at the 2009 Leon Home Meet, where he placed 10th. He posted a career-best time of 23.19 seconds in the 200-meter dash at the 2009 Chiles Capital City T&F Classic. In addition, he claimed a regional long jump title at the 2009 FHSAA 3A Region 1 after clearing a PR mark of 7.00 meters (22–9.5).

== College career ==
Allen attended and played college football for USC from 2011 to 2014.

Allen was redshirted as a freshman in 2011. As a redshirt freshman in 2012, he appeared in three games, rushing for 32 over six carries. As a redshirt sophomore in 2013, Allen saw a much expanded role. He played in all 14 games with four starts. He recorded 785 rushing yards on 135 carries and 14 touchdowns. After the season, he was named the team's MVP. As a junior in 2014, Allen was USC's leading rusher with 1,489 yards on 276 carries with 11 touchdowns.

After his junior season, Allen entered the 2015 NFL draft.

=== Statistics ===
Year	Team	Rushing					Receiving			
Year	Team	Att	Yds	Avg	Lng	TD	Rec	Yds	Avg	TD
2012	USC	6	32	5.3	14	0	0	0	0.0	0
2013	USC	135	785	5.8	79	14	22	252	11.5	1
2014	USC	276	1,489	5.4	53	11	41	458	11.2	1
Career		417	2,306	5.5	79	25	63	710	11.3	2

== Professional career ==
Pre-draft measurables
Height	Weight	Arm length	Hand span	40-yard dash	20-yard shuttle	Three-cone drill	Vertical jump	Broad jump	Bench press
6 ft 0 1/2 in (1.84 m)	221 lb (100 kg)	31 3/4 in (0.81 m)	9 3/8 in (0.24 m)	4.53 s	4.28 s	6.96 s	35.5 in (0.90 m)	10 ft 1 in (3.07 m)	11 reps
All values from NFL Combine

=== Baltimore Ravens ===
Allen was selected by the Baltimore Ravens in the fourth round, 125th overall, of the 2015 NFL draft. He was the tenth running back to be selected that year. He received his first career carry during the season opener against the Denver Broncos, finishing with nine carries for 30-yards and a reception for four yards. After running back Lorenzo Taliaferro was placed on injured/reserve with a season-ending injury during Week 4 and starting running back Justin Forsett was injured during a Week 11 contest against the St. Louis Rams, the rookie, Allen, would be promoted to first string and receive his first career start the next week. Allen finished the game with a career-high 22 carries for 67 yards and five catches for 48 yards. In Week 12, Allen received his first career start and scored his first career touchdown on a 12-yard touchdown reception in the second divisional matchup against the Cleveland Browns. In the following game, against the Miami Dolphins, he had 63 rushing yards and 12 receptions for 107 yards and a receiving touchdown. In Week 16, Allen scored his first-career rushing touchdown against the Pittsburgh Steelers. Overall, he finished his rookie season with 514 rushing yards, one rushing touchdown, 45 receptions, 353 receiving yards, and two receiving touchdowns.

With the emergence of Terrance West and Kenneth Dixon in the Ravens' backfield, Allen had a very limited role in the 2016 season. Overall, in eight games, he recorded nine rushes for 34 yards and three receptions for 15 yards.

Coming into the 2017 season, Allen was in competition with Danny Woodhead and Terrance West. Woodhead was lost to a hamstring injury in the season opener against the Cincinnati Bengals. In the game, Allen had 21 rushes for 71 yards in the 20–0 victory. In the Week 2 game against the Cleveland Browns, he had 14 rushes for 66 yards and five receptions for 35 yards and a receiving touchdown in the 24–10 victory. He had 21 carries for 73 yards and a touchdown three weeks later in a 30–17 win over the Oakland Raiders. In Week 10, Allen had seven catches and rushes apiece, had 65 total offensive yards, and caught a receiving touchdown in a 23–20 loss to the Tennessee Titans. He rushed five times for 15 yards and a touchdown in Week 12 against the Houston Texans as the Ravens won 23–16. Allen had his best game of the season two weeks later against the Steelers, when he carried six times for 25 yards, had two catches for 32 yards, and had two rushing touchdowns in a 38–39 shootout loss. Allen finished the 2017 season with 591 rushing yards, four rushing touchdowns, 46 receptions, 250 receiving yards, and two receiving touchdowns.

In Week 3 of the 2018 season, Allen scored both a rushing touchdown and a receiving touchdown in a 27–14 victory over the Broncos. On the 2018 season, Allen finished with 110 rushing yards and three rushing touchdowns to go along with 35 receptions for 196 receiving yards and two receiving touchdowns.

=== New Orleans Saints ===
On May 28, 2019, Allen signed with the New Orleans Saints. He was placed on injured reserve on July 30, 2019. He was released on August 9.

=== New York Giants ===
On October 11, 2019, Allen signed with the New York Giants. Allen had his first touchdown of the season, a one yard-rush in the fourth quarter, in Week 15 against the Dolphins in the 36–20 victory. In the 2019 season, he appeared in ten games and had ten carries for 36 rushing yards and one rushing touchdown.
