= Nelson Agholor =

American football player (born 1993)

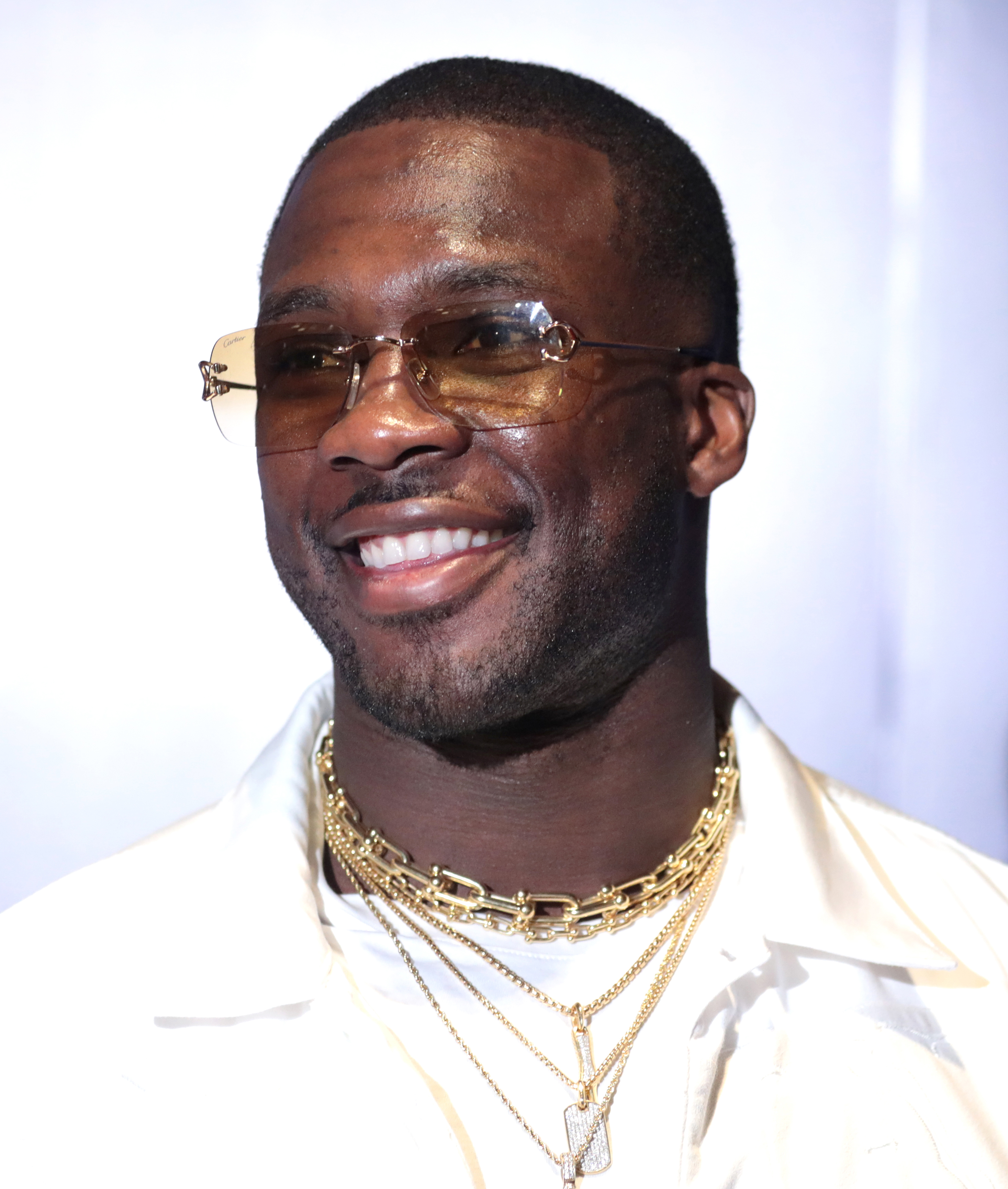
- Agholor in 2023

No. 13, 17, 15
- Position: Wide receiver

Personal information
- Born: May 24, 1993 (age 33); Lagos, Nigeria
- Listed height: 6 ft 0 in (1.83 m)
- Listed weight: 200 lb (91 kg)

Career information
- High school: Berkeley Preparatory School (Tampa, Florida, U.S.)
- College: USC (2012–2014)
- NFL draft: 2015: 1st round, 20th overall pick

Career history
- Philadelphia Eagles (2015–2019); Las Vegas Raiders (2020); New England Patriots (2021–2022); Baltimore Ravens (2023–2024)

Awards and highlights
- Super Bowl champion (LII); First-team All-Pac-12 (2014); Second-team All-Pac-12 (2013)

Career NFL statistics as of 2024
- Receptions: 389
- Receiving yards: 4,858
- Receiving touchdowns: 37
- Stats at Pro Football Reference

Nelson Efamehule Agholor (/ˈæɡəlɔːr/ AG-ə-lor; born May 24, 1993) is a Nigerian-American former professional football wide receiver. He played college football for the USC Trojans and was selected by the Philadelphia Eagles in the first round of the 2015 NFL draft. During his five seasons with the Eagles, Agholor won Super Bowl LII. He also played one season with the Las Vegas Raiders, two with the New England Patriots, and two more for the Baltimore Ravens.

== Early life ==
Agholor was born in Lagos, Nigeria, and moved to the United States at age five. He attended Berkeley Preparatory School in Tampa, Florida where he played running back, wide receiver, and defensive back for the Berkeley Buccaneers. Agholor was rated by Rivals.com as a five-star recruit and was ranked as the third-best wide receiver in his class. He committed to the University of Southern California in January 2012 over Notre Dame, Oklahoma, Florida, Florida State, and Alabama.

== College career ==
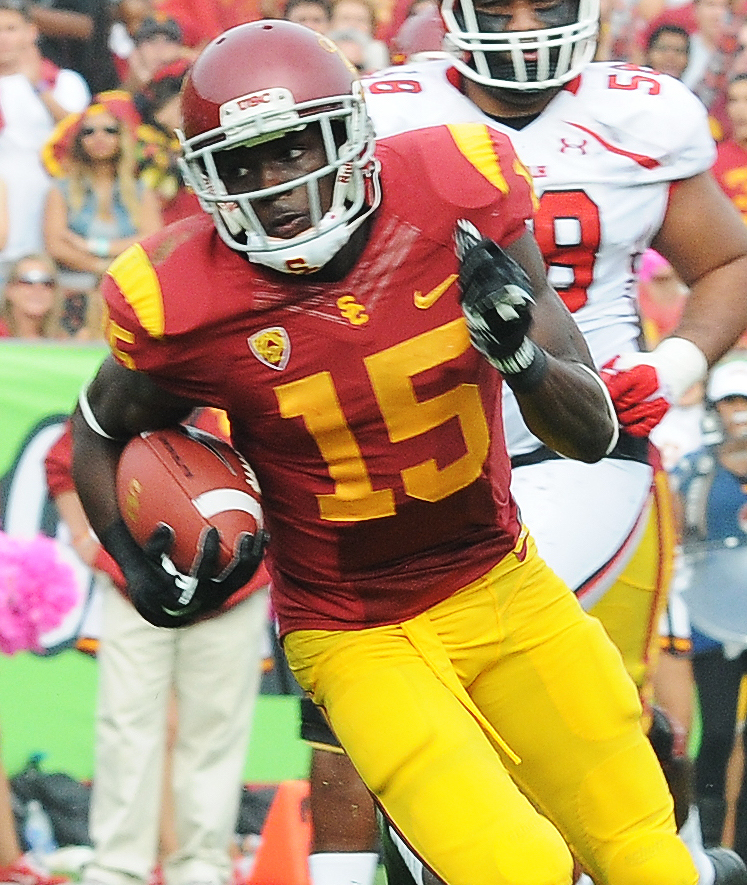
Agholor playing for USC against the Utah Utes in 2013

As a true freshman in 2012, Agholor played in all 13 games as a backup wide receiver and recorded 19 receptions for 340 yards and two touchdowns.

As a sophomore in 2013, Agholor became a starter. He started all 14 games, totaling 56 receptions for 918 yards and six touchdowns. Along with being the leading receiver, Agholor returned punts and kicks for the Trojans. He returned 18 punts for 343 yards and two touchdowns, and 10 kickoffs for 175 yards. Agholor was recognized as a second-team All-American by numerous sports outlets for his punt returning.

Agholor returned as a starter his junior season in 2014. He led the team with 104 receptions for 1,313 yards and 12 touchdowns.

After his junior season, Agholor decided to forgo his senior season and entered the 2015 NFL draft.

== Professional career ==
Pre-draft measurables
Height	Weight	Arm length	Hand span	40-yard dash	10-yard split	20-yard split	20-yard shuttle	Three-cone drill	Vertical jump	Broad jump	Bench press
6 ft 0 1/8 in (1.83 m)	198 lb (90 kg)	32 1/4 in (0.82 m)	9 1/4 in (0.23 m)	4.42 s	1.59 s	2.59 s	4.34 s	6.83 s	36 1/2 in (0.93 m)	10 ft 5 in (3.18 m)	12 reps
All values from NFL Combine and USC Pro Day

=== Philadelphia Eagles ===
==== 2015–2016 ====
Agholor was selected by the Philadelphia Eagles in the first round with the 20th overall pick of the 2015 NFL Draft. He signed a four-year contract on May 7, 2015, worth around $9.4 million with a signing bonus of $5.1 million. On December 13, He scored his first NFL career touchdown, a 53-yard reception from quarterback Sam Bradford, in a matchup against the Buffalo Bills. During his rookie season in 2015, Agholor played 13 games with 283 receiving yards and a touchdown.

During his second season in 2016, Agholor played 15 games with 365 receiving yards and two touchdowns.

==== 2017 ====
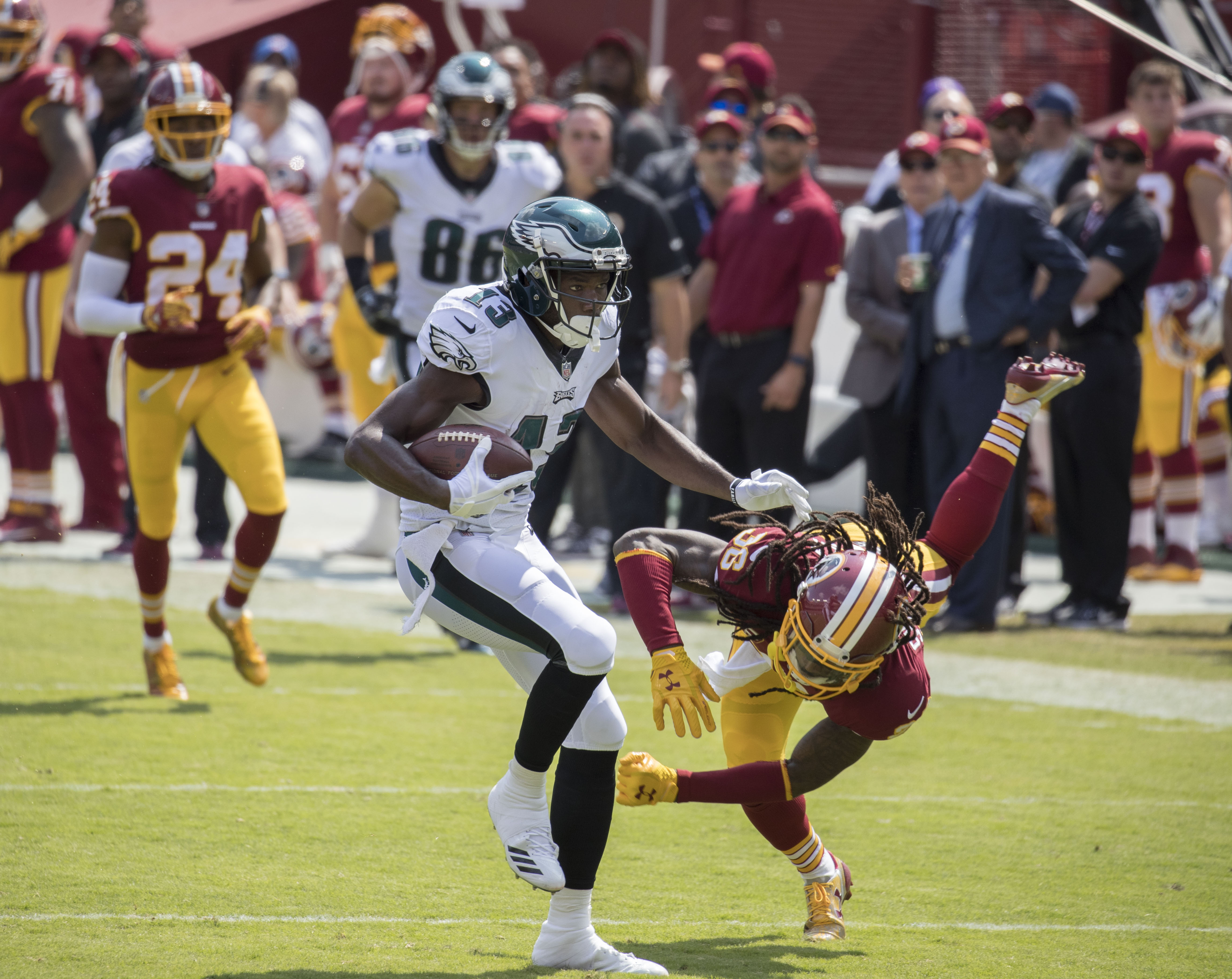
Agholor breaking a tackle before scoring a touchdown against the Washington Redskins in 2017

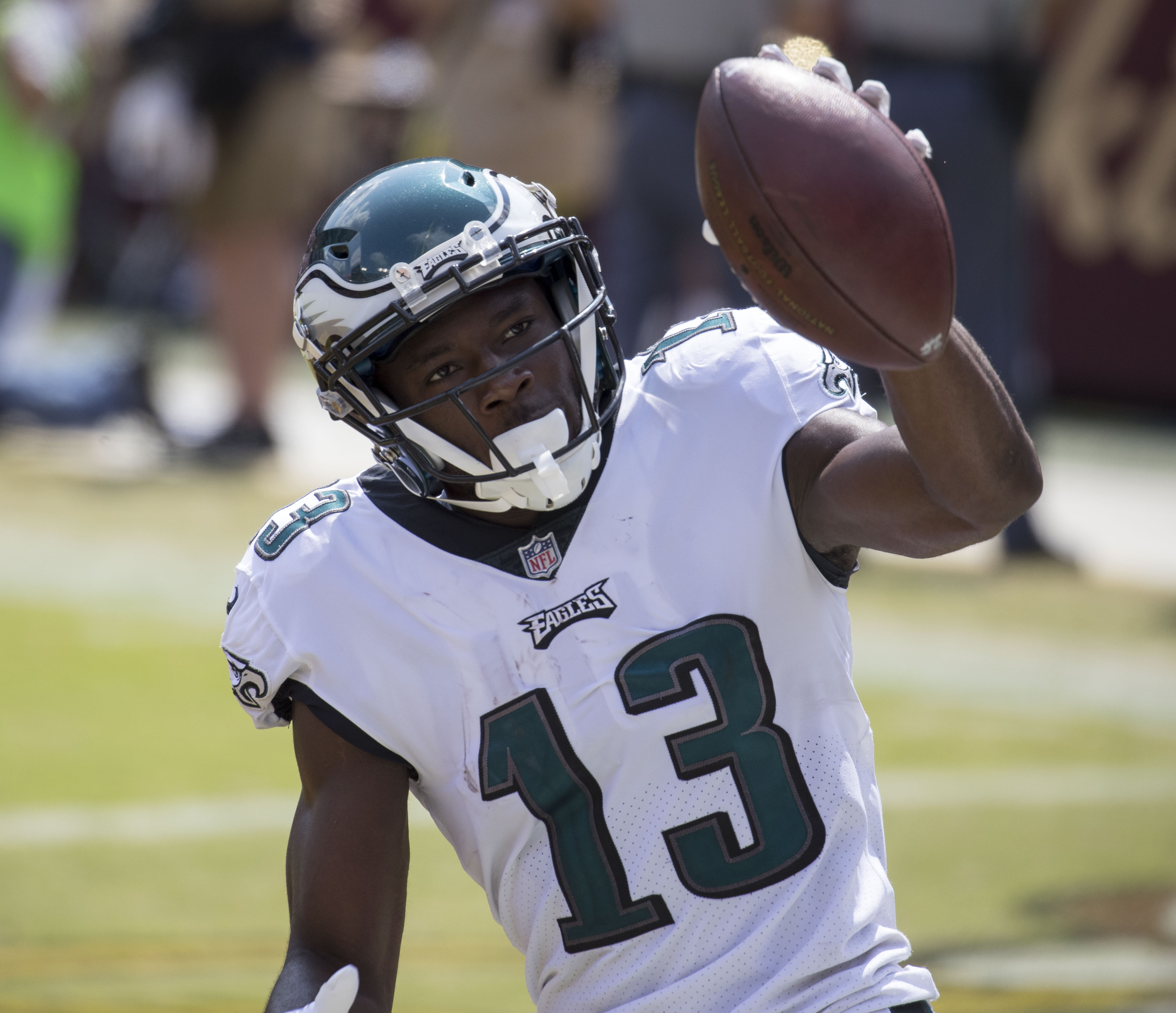
Agholor in 2017

On March 13, 2017, it was reported that Agholor would switch from #17, which he wore in his first two seasons, to #13. He opted to give #17 to the newly acquired free agent, wide receiver Alshon Jeffery.

During the 2017 season, Agholor found more success when he was switched to a slot receiver role. On September 10, 2017, in the season opening 30–17 victory over the Redskins, Agholor had a 58-yard receiving touchdown from quarterback Carson Wentz in the first quarter. He finished the game with six receptions for 86 yards. During a Week 2 27–20 loss to the Kansas City Chiefs, Agholor recorded his second touchdown of the season late in the fourth quarter to cut into the Chiefs' lead.

Agholor finished the 2017 regular season with his best season yet, getting more receiving yards and touchdowns than his previous two seasons combined. During Super Bowl LII against the New England Patriots, Agholor finished with nine receptions for 84 yards as the Eagles won 41–33, earning their first Super Bowl championship in franchise history.

==== 2018 ====
On April 30, 2018, the Eagles exercised the fifth-year option on Agholor's contract in order to retain him for the 2019 season.

During the season opener, against the Atlanta Falcons, Agholor completed his first career NFL pass attempt to Nick Foles on a trick play that went for 15 yards. The play helped set up an eventual Jay Ajayi-rushing touchdown in the Eagles' 18–12 victory. In the next game, Agholor scored his first receiving touchdown of the season as part of an eight-reception, 88-yard performance against the Tampa Bay Buccaneers. Agholor put his best statistical performance of the season in the narrow Week 16 32–30 victory over the Houston Texans with five receptions for 116 yards and a touchdown. Agholor finished the 2018 season with 64 receptions for 736 yards and four touchdowns.

==== 2019 ====
During Week 2 against the Falcons, Agholor caught eight passes for 107 yards and his first receiving touchdown of the season. However, with his team down late in the fourth quarter, he dropped a wide-open pass that could have led to the go-ahead score after losing it in the lights of Mercedes-Benz Stadium. The Eagles lost the game 24–20 as a result. In Week 3 against the Detroit Lions, Agholor caught eight passes for 50 yards and two touchdowns as the Eagles lost 27–24. Overall, Agholor finished the 2019 season with 39 receptions for 363 yards and three touchdowns.

=== Las Vegas Raiders ===
On March 25, 2020, Agholor signed a one-year contract with the Las Vegas Raiders.

Agholor entered training camp competing for a starting wide receiver job against Tyrell Williams, Zay Jones, Hunter Renfrow, and rookies Henry Ruggs and Bryan Edwards. At the end of training camp, head coach Jon Gruden named Agholor the fourth wide receiver on the Raiders' depth chart, behind Ruggs, Edwards, and Renfrow.

Agholor made his debut with the Raiders in Week 1 against the Carolina Panthers. During the game, Agholor caught one pass for a 23-yard touchdown in the 34–30 road victory. Following an injury to Edwards in Week 3, Agholor stepped into the starting lineup in Week 4 against the Bills and caught four passes for 44 yards and a touchdown. During Week 5 against the Chiefs, Agholor caught two passes for 67 yards, including a 59-yard touchdown reception, as the Raiders won 40–32. Two weeks later against the Buccaneers, he had five receptions for 107 receiving yards and a touchdown in the 45–20 loss. During Week 14 against the Indianapolis Colts, he had five receptions for 100 yards and a touchdown in the 44–27 loss. Two weeks later against the Miami Dolphins, Agholor recorded five receptions for 155 yards, including an 85-yard touchdown reception, during the narrow 26–25 loss. He finished the 2020 season with 48 receptions for 896 yards and eight touchdowns in 16 games and 13 starts.

=== New England Patriots ===
On March 19, 2021, Agholor signed a two-year, $26 million contract with the Patriots. In his Patriots debut, Agholor caught a touchdown from Mac Jones against the Dolphins in Week 1. Agholor finished the 2021 season with 37 receptions for 473 yards and three touchdowns in 15 games.

In Week 2 of the 2022 season against the Pittsburgh Steelers, Agholor had six receptions for 110 yards and a touchdown in the 17–14 victory. In Week 14 against the Arizona Cardinals, Agholor drew praise after he signaled to officials that teammate DeVante Parker was displaying signs of a head injury; Parker was subsequently evaluated and ruled out of the game with a concussion. He finished the season sixth on the team with 31 receptions for 362 yards and two touchdowns, his lowest mark since his rookie year.

=== Baltimore Ravens ===
On March 24, 2023, Agholor signed a one-year, $3.25 million contract with the Baltimore Ravens. He started in Week 1 against the Houston Texans, but did not record any statistics in the 25–9 victory. In the next game against the Cincinnati Bengals, Agholor caught five passes for 63 yards and a touchdown in a 27–24 upset victory. Three weeks later against the Pittsburgh Steelers, he recorded a season-high 64 yards on four receptions in the 17–10 road loss. During Week 7 against the Detroit Lions, Agholor recorded a 12-yard touchdown reception in the 38–6 blowout victory. His next receiving touchdown came in a Week 11 34–20 victory over the Cincinnati Bengals on a 37-yard touchdown reception off a pass that had been tipped. Agholor's final touchdown of the regular season came in a Week 16 33–19 road victory over the San Francisco 49ers; he caught three passes for 10 yards and a touchdown during the game. Agholor finished the season with 35 receptions for 381 yards and four touchdowns.

In the Divisional Round against the Houston Texans, Agholor recorded two receptions for 12 yards and a touchdown in a 34–10 rout.

On February 18, 2024, Agholor signed a one-year contract extension to stay in Baltimore. He finished the 2024 season with 14 receptions for 231 yards and two touchdowns.

== Career statistics ==
=== NFL ===
Legend
	Won the Super Bowl
**Bold**	Career high

==== Regular season ====
Year	Team	Games		Receiving					Rushing					Fumbles	
Year	Team	GP	GS	Rec	Yds	Avg	Lng	TD	Att	Yds	Avg	Lng	TD	Fum	Lost
2015	PHI	13	12	23	283	12.3	53	1	0	0	0.0	0	0	1	1
2016	PHI	15	14	36	365	10.1	40	2	**5**	14	2.8	5	0	1	0
2017	PHI	16	10	62	768	12.4	72	**8**	1	7	7.0	7	0	0	0
2018	PHI	16	16	**64**	736	11.5	83T	4	3	**32**	**10.7**	**16**	0	1	0
2019	PHI	11	11	39	363	9.3	43	3	2	7	3.5	**16**	0	**2**	1
2020	LV	16	13	48	**896**	**18.7**	**85T**	**8**	0	0	0.0	0	0	0	0
2021	NE	15	13	37	473	12.8	44	3	3	11	3.7	6	0	0	0
2022	NE	16	7	31	362	11.7	44	2	0	0	0	0	0	**2**	**2**
2023	BAL	17	3	35	381	10.9	37	4	0	0	0	0	0	1	0
2024	BAL	14	7	14	231	16.5	56	2	0	0	0	0	0	1	0
Total		149	105	389	4,858	12.5	85T	37	14	71	5.1	16	0	8	4

==== Postseason ====
Year	Team	Games		Receiving					Rushing					Fumbles	
Year	Team	GP	GS	Rec	Yds	Avg	Lng	TD	Att	Yds	Avg	Lng	TD	Fum	Lost
2017	PHI	3	3	**15**	**167**	11.1	**42**	0	**4**	**29**	7.3	**21**	0	0	0
2018	PHI	2	2	4	38	9.5	13	0	1	12	**12.0**	12	0	0	0
2021	NE	1	1	1	18	18.0	18	0	0	0	0.0	0	0	0	0
2023	BAL	2	0	3	51	17.0	39	**1**	0	0	0.0	0	0	0	0
2024	BAL	2	0	1	25	**25.0**	25	0	0	0	0.0	0	0	0	0
Total		10	6	24	299	12.5	42	1	5	41	8.2	21	0	0	0

=== College ===
Season	Team	Receiving					Punt return				Kick return			
Season	Team	Rec	Yds	Avg	Lng	TD	Ret	Yds	Avg	TD	Ret	Yds	Avg	TD
2012	USC	19	340	17.9	76	2	0	0	0.0	0	5	121	24.2	0
2013	USC	56	918	16.4	62	6	17	351	20.6	2	10	175	17.5	0
2014	USC	104	1,313	12.6	87	12	20	197	9.9	2	9	147	16.3	0
Career		179	2,571	14.4	87	20	37	548	14.8	4	24	443	18.5	0
