= Andre Heidari =

American football player (born 1993)

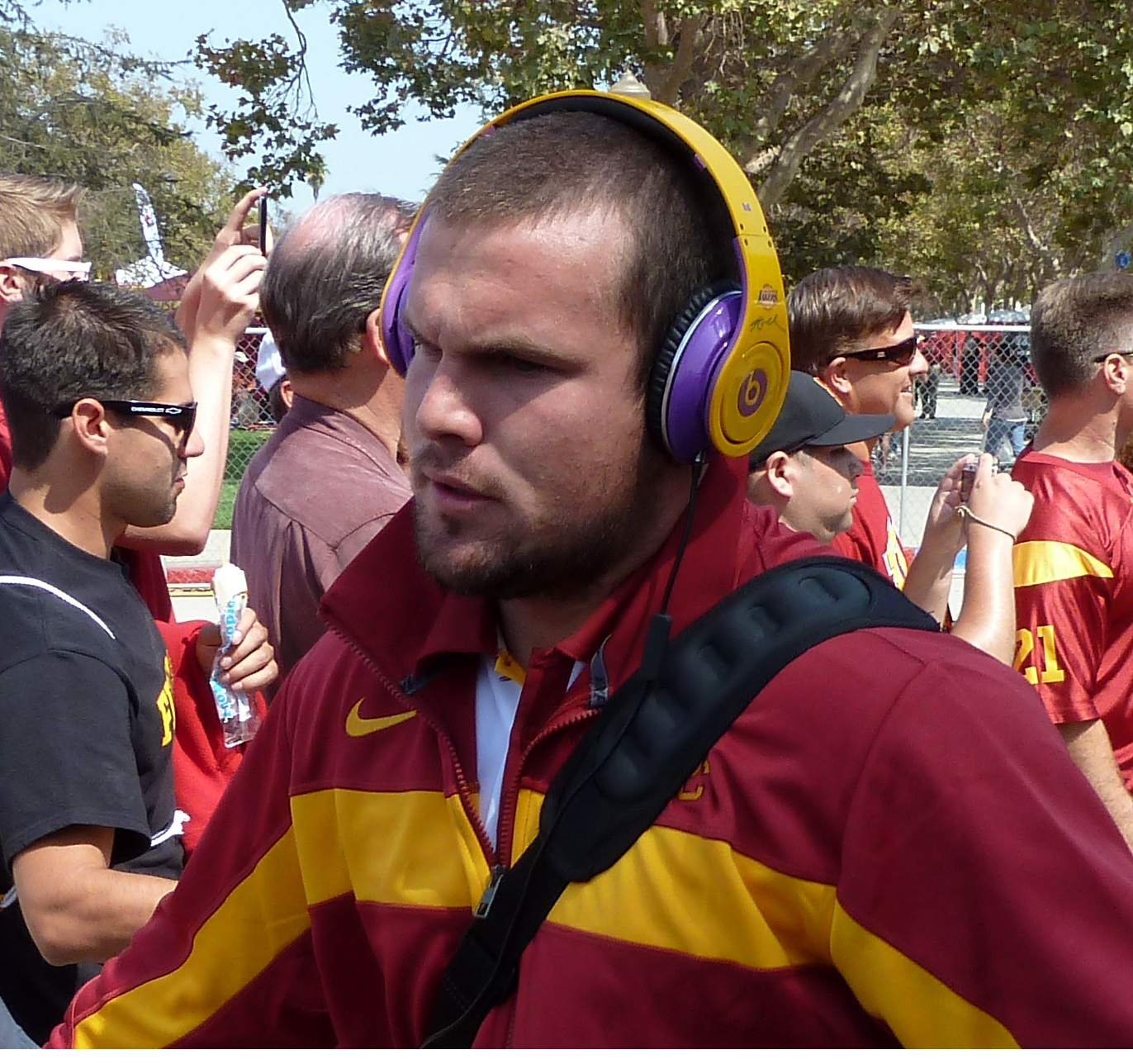
- Heidari before a game during the 2011 season

No. 48
- Position: Placekicker

Personal information
- Born: July 12, 1993 (age 33); Searcy, Arkansas, U.S.
- Listed height: 5 ft 11 in (1.80 m)
- Listed weight: 220 lb (100 kg)

Career information
- High school: Bakersfield (CA) Stockdale
- College: USC
- NFL draft: 2015: undrafted

Career history
- Los Angeles KISS (2015–2016)

Awards and highlights
- First-team All-Pac-12 (2011)

Career AFL statistics
- Field goals made: 1
- Field goals attempted: 4
- PAT Made: 36
- PAT Att: 45
- Tackles: 2.5
- Stats at ArenaFan.com

Andre Heidari (born July 12, 1993) is an American former football placekicker. He played college football for the USC Trojans. As a true freshman in 2011, he completed 88.2% of his field goals, the third highest field goal percentage in the nation, and all 50 of his PAT attempts. He was named First Team All-Pac-12, Sports Illustrated All-American Honorable Mention, and First Team Freshman All-American by Phil Steele. He was also a 2011 Lou Groza Award semifinalist.

== Early life ==
Heidari attended Stockdale High School in Bakersfield, California where his 2010 honors included UnderArmour All-American, Super Prep All-Farwest, Prep Star All-West, Tacoma News Tribune Western 100 and Cal-Hi Sports All-State third team as a senior placekicker and punter. As a 2009 junior, 59 of his 70 kickoffs were touchbacks and 20 of his punts pinned opponents within the 20-yard line (with a long of 63 yards) as he made the All-Southwest Yosemite League second team.

== College career ==
As a true freshman in 2010, Heidari was the starting placekicker and kickoff specialist for USC. In 12 games, he completed 15 of 17 field goals and all 50 of his PAT tries. His 88.2% field goal percentage was third in the nation among kickers with at least 10 made field goals (and the best among freshmen and sophomore kickers). He made nine consecutive field goals before a miss at Notre Dame and was 4-of-5 on field goals of at least 40 yards in 2011 (with a 50-yarder). Of his 76 kickoffs in 2011, 25 pinned opponents within the 20-yard line (including 10 touchbacks). He also made four tackles.

He was one of 20 semifinalists for the 2011 Groza Award. He made the 2011 CBSSports.com, CollegeFootball News.com and Phil Steele Freshman All-American first team and YahooSports.com Freshman All-American second team. He made 2011 SI.com All-American honorable mention. He made the 2011 All-Pac-12 first team. He made the 2011 ESPN.com, CBSSports.com and Phil Steele All-Pac-12 first team.

In the opening game of the 2012 season against Hawaii, Heidari tore his meniscus in his right leg. With an injury, Heidari returned to make a 28-yard field goal to end the first half.

== Professional career ==
On June 10, 2015, Heidari was assigned to the Los Angeles KISS of the Arena Football League (AFL).
