= Max Tuerk =

American football player (1994–2020)

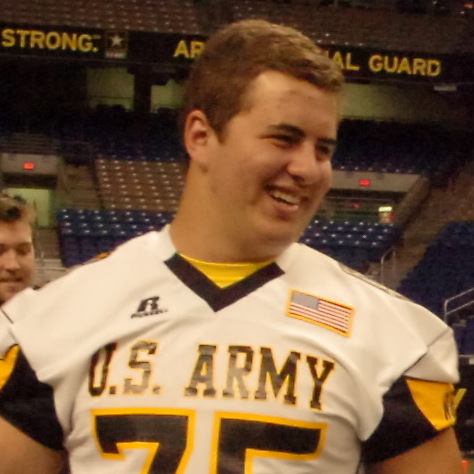
- Tuerk in 2012

No. 62, 79
- Position: Center

Personal information
- Born: January 27, 1994; Trabuco Canyon, California, U.S.
- Died: June 20, 2020 (aged 26); Cleveland National Forest, California, U.S.
- Listed height: 6 ft 5 in (1.96 m)
- Listed weight: 285 lb (129 kg)

Career information
- High school: Santa Margarita Catholic (Rancho Santa Margarita, California)
- College: USC (2012–2015)
- NFL draft: 2016: 3rd round, 66th overall pick

Career history
- San Diego / Los Angeles Chargers (2016–2017); Arizona Cardinals (2017)

Awards and highlights
- Freshman All-American (2012); First-team All-Pac-12 (2014)

Career NFL statistics
- Games played: 1
- Stats at Pro Football Reference

Max Tuerk (January 27, 1994 – June 20, 2020) was an American professional football player who was a center in the National Football League (NFL). He played college football for the USC Trojans. He was a first-team all-Pac-12 Conference selection in 2014. Tuerk was selected in the third round of the 2016 NFL draft by the San Diego Chargers. He spent his rookie year with the Chargers and split time in his second and final NFL season with the Chargers and the Arizona Cardinals.

== Early life ==
A native of Trabuco Canyon, California, Max Tuerk was the eldest of Greg and Valerie Tuerk's four children. His father played tight end for Brown University in the early 1980s.

Max Tuerk attended Santa Margarita Catholic High School, where he was a two-way lineman. His team won the CIF Pac-5 title (i.e., the Southern California championship) and CIF Division I state title in 2011. (Division I was the second-highest of five divisions at the time.) He also participated in track & field. Regarded as a four-star recruit by Rivals.com, Tuerk was listed as the No. 7 offensive tackle prospect in his class.

== College career ==
In his true freshman year at USC, Tuerk emerged as the starting left offensive tackle for USC's final five regular season games of 2012 after serving as a backup earlier in the season. When he got his first start at Arizona, he became the first-ever USC true freshman to start at left tackle (and the first to start at tackle since Winston Justice in the last 12 games of 2002). Tuerk was named Freshman All-American by College Football News. He played in every game his first 3 seasons and was named to many all-star teams. Tuerk played all three interior lineman positions, but he was primarily a center. He was a team captain both his junior and senior years. Tuerk was considered one of the top centers in college football at the beginning of his senior year, but his season was cut short after five games when he tore an anterior cruciate ligament.

== Professional career ==
=== San Diego / Los Angeles Chargers ===
Tuerk was unable to participate in the post-season draft combines because of his knee injury, except he was able to do the bench press test. He was drafted by the San Diego Chargers in the third round, 66th overall, in the 2016 NFL draft.

Tuerk made the Chargers' roster in 2016 but was inactive for all 16 regular-season games, although he did play during the pre-season. Tuerk was suspended for the first four games of the 2017 season after violating the NFL policy on performance-enhancing substances. After being reinstated from suspension on October 3, 2017, he was released by the Chargers. He was re-signed to the Chargers practice squad on October 26, 2017.

=== Arizona Cardinals ===
On November 6, 2017, Tuerk was signed by the Arizona Cardinals off the Chargers' practice squad. On December 24, 2017, Tuerk made his only appearance in a regular-season NFL game on one play in Week 16, as the Cardinals beat the New York Giants, 23–0.

On April 12, 2018, Tuerk was released by the Cardinals.

== Death ==
On June 20, 2020, Tuerk collapsed and died of an enlarged heart, an autopsy report revealed, while on a hike with his parents in the Cleveland National Forest. According to his family, Tuerk was struggling with mental illness during and after his pro football career. His mother Valerie Tuerk told the Los Angeles Times that the family had arranged to have his brain tissue sent to Boston University's Chronic Traumatic Encephalopathy (CTE) Center. She said: "That was very important to us, because we feel that CTE probably had some impact on Max".

An autopsy later confirmed that Tuerk had CTE. He is one of at least 345 NFL players to be diagnosed after death with this disease, which is caused by repeated hits to the head.

A memorial service was held for Tuerk's friends and family on a beach near his home on Saturday, June 27, 2020, one week after his death.
