= Gerald Bowman =

American football player (born 1989)

No. 34
- Position: Safety

Personal information
- Born: October 31, 1989 (age 37); Philadelphia, Pennsylvania, U.S.
- Listed height: 6 ft 1 in (1.85 m)
- Listed weight: 205 lb (93 kg)

Career information
- High school: Imhotep Institute Charter High School (PA)
- College: Los Angeles Pierce JC; Southern California
- NFL draft: 2015: undrafted

Career history
- Baltimore Ravens (2015)*
- * Offseason or practice squad member only

Gerald “GeBow” Bowman (born October 31, 1989) is an American former professional football safety. He played college football at Southern California.

== Career ==
After going unselected in the 2015 NFL draft, Bowman signed with the Baltimore Ravens as an undrafted free agent on May 3, 2015.
