= Glenn Davis Award =

The Glenn Davis Award was given annually from 1987 to 2017 by the Los Angeles Times to the best high school football player in the Los Angeles area.

It is named after Glenn Davis, the 1946 Heisman Trophy winner who prepped at Bonita High School in La Verne and Cal Poly Pomona in Pomona. Davis led the Bonita Bearcats to a 39–6 win over Newport Harbor in the 1942 CIF Southern Section final by scoring five touchdowns. Davis later joined the Los Angeles Times as a director of special events, a position he held until his retirement in 1986.

1989 winner Kevin Copeland died of heart failure during a game on October 6, 1989, and won the Award posthumously.

== Past winners ==
Season	Player	Position	High school	College	Reference
1987	Russell White	RB	Crespi Carmelite	California	
1988	Derek Brown	RB	Servite	Nebraska	
1989	Kevin Copeland	WR	Dorsey		
1990	John Walsh	QB	Carson	BYU	
1991	Billy Blanton	QB	Mater Dei	San Diego State	
1992	Travis Kirschke	DT	Esperanza	UCLA	
1993	Glenn Thompkins	QB	Eisenhower	UCLA	
1994	Daylon McCutcheon	RB/DB	Bishop Amat Memorial	USC	
1995	Chris Claiborne	LB/RB	John W. North	USC	
1996	Antoine Harris	TE/DE	Loyola	USC	
1997	DeShaun Foster	RB/DB	Tustin	UCLA	
1998	Chris Lewis	QB	Long Beach Polytechnic	Stanford	
1999	Matt Grootegoed	RB/LB	Mater Dei	USC	
2000	Tyler Ebell	RB	Ventura	UCLA	
2001	Hershel Dennis	RB	Long Beach Polytechnic	USC	
2002	Whitney Lewis	WR	St. Bonaventure	USC	
2003	Brigham Harwell	DL/FB	Los Altos	UCLA	
2004	DeSean Jackson	WR	Long Beach Polytechnic	California	
2005	Toby Gerhart	RB	Norco	Stanford	
2006	Aaron Corp	QB	Lutheran	USC	
2007	Matt Barkley	QB	Mater Dei	USC	
2008	Taylor Martinez	QB	Centennial	Nebraska	
2009	Cody Fajardo	QB	Servite	Nevada	
2010	De'Anthony Thomas	RB/CB	Crenshaw	Oregon	
2011	Su'a Cravens	RB/WR/LB	Vista Murrieta	USC	
2012	Thomas Duarte	WR/LB	Mater Dei	UCLA	
2013	Jaleel Wadood	S	St. John Bosco	UCLA	
2014	Josh Rosen	QB	St. John Bosco	UCLA	
2015	Mique Juarez	LB	North High	UCLA	
2016	Wyatt Davis	OL	St. John Bosco	Ohio State	
2017	J. T. Daniels	QB	Mater Dei	USC/Georgia/West Virginia/Rice	
