= 2015 USC Trojans football team =

American college football season

2015 USC Trojans football

Pac-12 South Division co-champion

Pac-12 Championship Game, L 22–41 vs. Stanford

Holiday Bowl, L 21–23 vs. Wisconsin
- Conference: Pac-12 Conference
- South Division
- Record: 8–6 (6–3 Pac-12)
- Head coach: Steve Sarkisian (2nd season; first 5 games); Clay Helton (interim; remainder of season)
- Co-offensive coordinators: Clay Helton (3rd season); Tee Martin (1st season)
- Offensive scheme: Multiple
- Defensive coordinator: Justin Wilcox (2nd season)
- Base defense: Multiple 3–4
- Captain: 5: Cody Kessler; Anthony Sarao; Su'a Cravens; Max Tuerk; Antwaun Woods
- Home stadium: Los Angeles Memorial Coliseum

2015 Pac-12 Conference football standings
	Conf.			Overall
Team	W		L	W		L
North Division
No. 3 Stanford xy$	8	–	1	12	–	2
No. 19 Oregon	7	–	2	9	–	4
Washington State	6	–	3	9	–	4
California	4	–	5	8	–	5
Washington	4	–	5	7	–	6
Oregon State	0	–	9	2	–	10
South Division
USC xy	6	–	3	8	–	6
No. 17 Utah x	6	–	3	10	–	3
UCLA	5	–	4	8	–	5
Arizona State	4	–	5	6	–	7
Arizona	3	–	6	7	–	6
Colorado	1	–	8	4	–	9
Championship: Stanford 41, USC 22
$ – Conference champion; x – Division champion/co-champions; y – Championship game participant; Rankings from AP Poll

The 2015 USC Trojans football team represented the University of Southern California in the 2015 NCAA Division I FBS football season. USC played their home games at the Los Angeles Memorial Coliseum and were members of the South Division of the Pac-12 Conference. On November 30, 2015, Clay Helton was named USC's permanent head coach.

== Personnel ==
=== Coaching staff ===
Name	Position	Seasons at USC	Alma mater	Before USC
Clay Helton	Head Coach	5	Houston (1994)	Memphis – OC Coordinator (2009)
Tee Martin	Offensive coordinator / wide receivers coach / pass game coordinator	4	Tennessee (2000)	Kentucky – WR Coach (2011)
Johnny Nansen	Tailbacks Coach / special teams coach / assistant head coach	2	Washington State (1997)	Washington – ST Coordinator / RB Coach (2013)
Peter Sirmon	Linebackers coach / recruiting coordinator / associate head coach defense	2	Oregon (1999)	Washington – LB Coach (2013)
Marques Tuiasosopo	Quarterbacks coach / associate head coach offense	2	Washington (2001)	Washington – QB Coach (2013)
Lenny Vandermade	Tight ends coach	1	USC (2003)	San Diego – TE Coach (2015)
Ivan Lewis	Strength and conditioning	2	San Diego (2003)	Washington – Strength and Conditioning (2013)
Mike Goff	Offensive line coach	1	Iowa (1998)	Hilltop High School – Assistant Coach (2014)
Kenechi Udeze	Defensive line coach / assistant strength and conditioning coach	1	USC (2004)	PITT – Assistant strength and conditioning coach (2015)
Ricky Brown	Linebackers coach	1	Boston College (2006)	Baltimore Ravens – LB (Player) (2012)
Patrick Henderson	Safeties Coach	1	Oregon State (2010)	Contra Costa College – DB Coach / defensive coordinator (2013)
Drew Pearson	Cornerbacks coach	1	Utah State (2008)	Child and Family Specialist at Five Acres in Altadena, California (2008–2014)
Mike Tuiasosopo	Defensive line coach	1	University of the Pacific (1991)	UCLA – OLB Coach (2015)
Jaron Fairman	Offensive assistant	2	Fresno State (2007)	Crespi Carmelite High School – WR Coach / ST Coordinator (2013)

=== Roster ===
2015 USC Trojans Football
Quarterback: 4 Max Browne – (redshirt) sophomore (6'5, 220); 6 Cody Kessler – (redshirt) senior (6'1, 215); 14 Sam Darnold – freshman (6'4, 215) *; 15 Michael Bowman – (redshirt) freshman (6'4, 210); 19 Conner Sullivan – (redshirt) junior (6'0, 195) (+H); Tailback: 16 Dominic Davis – freshman (5'10, 175) (+WR)*; 22 Justin Davis – junior (6'1, 195); 23 Tre Madden – (redshirt) senior (6'1, 225); 24 Stefan Smith – (redshirt) freshman (6'0, 195); 25 Ronald Jones II – freshman (6'0, 185) *; 26 James Toland IV – (redshirt) sophomore (5'11, 185); 27 Lance Mudd – sophomore (6'1, 200); 28 Aca'Cedric Ware – freshman (6'0, 200) *; Fullback: 31 Soma Vainuku – (redshirt) senior (6'0, 255); 38 Jahleel Pinner – senior (5'11, 240); Wide receiver: 1 Darreus Rogers – junior (6'1, 215); 7 Steven Mitchell – (redshirt) sophomore (5'10, 190); 9 JuJu Smith-Schuster – sophomore (6'2, 215); 10 Jalen Greene – (redshirt) freshman (6'1, 195) (+QB); 15 Isaac Whitney – (redshirt) junior (6'3, 205) *; 18 Ajene Harris – sophomore (5'11, 185); 29 Christian Tober – (redshirt) junior (5'8, 175); 34 Yoofi Quansah – sophomore (5'8, 165); 41 Bo St. Geme – freshman (6'0, 170); 44 Jake Russell – freshman (5'11, 170); 80 Deontay Burnett – freshman (6'0, 170) (Blueshirt); 83 George Katrib – senior (6'0, 185); 84 Jackson Boyer – (redshirt) sophomore (6'3, 195); 85 David Mellstrom – (redshirt) senior (6'0, 180); 86 Robby Kolanz – (redshirt) junior (5'10, 175); 89 De'Quan Hampton – junior (6'4, 220) *; Tight end: 47 Cyrus Hobbi – (redshirt) senior (6'3, 245); 48 Taylor McNamara – (redshirt) junior (6'5, 245) (Blueshirt); 49 Daniel Imatorbhebhe – freshman (6'4, 225) (Blueshirt); 81 Conner Spears – (redshirt) Sophomore (6'6, 245); 82 Tyler Petite – freshman (6'6, 235); 87 Caleb Wilson – freshman (6'5, 225) *	Offensive lineman: 50 Toa Lobendahn – OG-OT – sophomore (6'3, 290); 51 Damien Mama – OG – sophomore (6'4, 355); 56 Jordan Austin – OT – (redshirt) freshman (6'5, 280); 60 Viane Talamaivao – OG – sophomore (6'2, 320); 62 Khaliel Rodgers – C – (redshirt) sophomore (6'3, 305); 63 Roy Hemsley – OT-OG – freshman (6'5, 315) *; 64 Richie Wenzel – C – (redshirt) freshman (6'1, 265); 65 Erick Jepsen – OG – (redshirt) senior (6'1, 285); 66 Cole Smith – C – freshman (6'4, 280) *; 70 Chuma Edoga – OT – freshman (6'4, 280) *; 72 Chad Wheeler – OT – (redshirt) junior (6'7, 280); 73 Zach Banner – OT – (redshirt) junior (6'9, 360); 74 Nico Falah – OT – (redshirt) sophomore (6'4, 285); 75 Max Tuerk – C – senior (6'6, 285); 76 Clayton Johnston – OT – freshman (6'6, 290) (Blueshirt); 77 Chris Brown – OG – (redshirt) freshman (6'5, 295); Defensive tackle: 52 Delvon Simmons – (redshirt) senior (6'5, 295); 53 Kevin Scott – freshman (6'5, 315) (+DE) *; 68 Jordan Simmons – (redshirt) junior (6'4, 325) (+OG); 79 Jeff Miller – (redshirt) junior (6'1, 240); 91 Noah Jefferson – freshman (6'6, 330) *; 92 Jacob Daniel – freshman (6'4, 325) *; 95 Kenny Bigelow Jr. – (redshirt) sophomore (6'3, 290); 98 Cody Temple – (redshirt) senior (6'2, 300); 99 Antwaun Woods – (redshirt) senior (6'1, 320); Defensive end: 44 Malik Dorton – (redshirt) freshman (6'2, 275); 89 Christian Rector – freshman (6'5, 260) *; 90 Claude Pelon – (redshirt) Senior (6'4, 300); 93 Greg Townsend Jr. – (redshirt) senior (6'3, 275); 94 Rasheem Green – freshman (6'5, 285) (+DT) *; Placekicker: 36 Matt Boermeester – (redshirt) sophomore (6'0, 180); 39 Alex Wood – (redshirt) junior (5'10, 175); 46 Wyatt Schmidt – (redshirt) freshman (6'3, 215); Punter: 17 Kris Albarado – (redshirt) senior (5'10, 195); 36 Chris Tilbey – sophomore (6'5, 220); 46 Reid Budrovich – (redshirt) freshman (5'11, 185)	Linebacker: 10 John Houston Jr. – OLB – freshman (6'3, 220) *; 18 Quinton Powell – OLB – junior (6'2, 205); 19 Michael Hutchings – ILB – junior (6'1, 225); 21 Su'a Cravens – OLB – junior (6'1, 225); 34 Olajuwon Tucker – ILB – sophomore (6'3, 235); 35 Cameron Smith – ILB – freshman (6'2, 245) *; 40 Jabari Ruffin – OLB – (redshirt) junior (6'3, 245); 42 Uchenna Nwosu – OLB – sophomore (6'3, 210); 45 Porter Gustin – OLB – freshman (6'5, 250) (+TE) *; 47 Scott Felix – OLB – (redshirt) junior (6'2, 240); 49 Matt Bayle – OLB – freshman (6'2, 215); 50 Grant Moore – OLB – (redshirt) freshman (6'0, 220); 51 Joel Foy – ILB – (redshirt) sophomore (6'1, 225); 54 Reuben Peters – ILB – (redshirt) freshman (6'0, 225); 55 Lamar Dawson – ILB – (redshirt) senior (6'1, 230); 56 Anthony Sarao – ILB – (redshirt) senior (6'0, 235); 58 Osa Masina – ILB – freshman (6'4, 245) (+TE) *; 59 Don Hill – OLB – (redshirt) freshman (6'2, 245); 97 Wyatt Vinci – OLB – (redshirt) junior (6'2, 235); Cornerback: 2 Adoree' Jackson – sophomore (5'11, 185) (+WR & RET); 8 Iman Marshall – freshman (6'2, 200) *; 13 Kevon Seymour – senior (6'0, 185); 14 Isaiah Langley – freshman (6'0, 165) (+WR) *; 23 Jonathan Lockett – sophomore (5'11, 180); 28 Ryan Dillard – senior (5'9, 190); 29 Kevin Carrasco – (redshirt) sophomore (6'0, 185); 38 Jalen Jones – (redshirt) freshman (5'8, 155); Safety: 4 Chris Hawkins – (redshirt) sophomore (5'11, 190); 7 Marvell Tell – freshman (6'2, 190) *; 22 Leon McQuay III – junior (6'1, 190); 24 John Plattenburg – sophomore (5'11, 185); 26 Davonte Nunnery – (redshirt) freshman (5'10, 205); 27 Jonathan LaBonty – (redshirt) freshman (6'0, 200); 30 Ykili Ross – freshman (6'2, 185) (+CB & WR)*; 37 Matt Lopes – (redshirt) sophomore (5'11, 185); 41 Deion Hart – (redshirt) junior (6'0, 195); Long snappers: 57 Nick Schlossberg – (redshirt) junior (6'0, 205); 61 Jake Olson – freshman (6'4, 195); 92 Zach Smith – junior (6'1, 220)
* : 2015 USC Trojans Football Commits (09/04/2015)

=== Returning starters ===
USC returns 31 starters in 2015, including fifteen on offense, twelve on defense, and four on special teams.

Key departures include Javorius 'Buck' Allen (TB – 13 games), Nelson Agholor (WR – 13 games), George Farmer (WR – 4 games), Randall Telfer (TE – 12 games), Aundrey Walker (OT), Leonard Williams (DE / DT – 13 games), J. R. Tavai (LB – 9 games), Hayes Pullard (LB – 12 games), Josh Shaw (CB / S – 2 games), Gerald Bowman (S – 10 games), Andre Heidari (K – 11 games).

Other departures : Ricky Town (QB – Freshman – Arkansas), Bryce Dixon (TE), Jalen Cope-Fitzpatrick (TE), Charles Burks (LB – Junior RS – Azusa Pacific), Rahshead Johnson (CB / S – Freshman – San Jose State), Lamont Simmons (CB – Freshman RS – Georgia Tech), Devian Shelton (CB – Sophomore RS), Peter McBride (SNP – Junior RS).

==== Offense (15) ====
Player	Class	Position	Games started
Cody Kessler	Senior (redshirt)	Quarterback	13 games
Soma Vainuku*	Senior (redshirt)	Fullback	2 games
Jahleel Pinner*	Senior	Fullback	2 games
JuJu Smith-Schuster	Sophomore	Wide receiver (+ DB)	13 games
Darreus Rogers	Junior	Wide receiver	3 games
Steven Mitchell	Sophomore (redshirt)	Wide receiver	5 games
Ajene Harris	Sophomore	Wide receiver	1 game
Bryce Dixon	Sophomore	Tight end	1 game
Max Tuerk	Senior	Center	13 games
Zach Banner	Junior (redshirt)	Right tackle	13 games
Toa Lobendahn	Sophomore	Left tackle	13 games
Chad Wheeler	Junior (redshirt)	Left tackle	8 games
Viane Talamaivao	Sophomore	Right guard	11 games
Damien Mama	Sophomore	Left guard	4 games
Khaliel Rodgers	Sophomore (redshirt)	Left guard	3 games

==== Defense (12) ====
Player	Class	Position	Games started
Antwaun Woods	Senior (redshirt)	Defensive tackle	10 games
Delvon Simmons	Senior (redshirt)	Defensive tackle	10 games
Claude Pelon	Senior (redshirt)	Defensive tackle	3 games
Scott Star Felix	Junior (redshirt)	Outside Linebacker	5 games
Anthony Sarao	Senior (redshirt)	Inside linebacker	13 games
Michael Hutchings	Junior	Inside linebacker	1 game
Kevon Seymour	Senior	Cornerback	11 games
Adoree' Jackson	Sophomore	Cornerback (+ WR)	10 games
Chris Hawkins	Sophomore (redshirt)	Cornerback	4 games
Su'a Cravens	Junior	Safety (+ OLB)	13 games
Christian Margarum	Junior	Safety	13 games

==== Special teams (4) ====
Player	Class	Position	Games started
Alex Wood	Junior (redshirt)	Kicker	2 games
Kris Albarado	Senior (redshirt)	Punter	12 games
Conner Sullivan	Junior (redshirt)	Holder	12 games
Zach Smith	Junior	Long snapper	12 games

- : Co-Started in 2014

=== Depth chart ===
Defense

FS
Chris Hawkins
John Plattenburg
⋅

WLB	ILB	ILB	SLB
Porter Gustin	Olajuwon Tucker	Anthony Sarao	Su'a Cravens
Scott Felix	Michael Hutchings	Osa Masina	Don Hill
Jabari Ruffin	Uchenna Nwosu	Joel Foy	Quinton Powell

SS
Marvell Tell
Leon McQuay III
⋅

CB
Adoree' Jackson #
Isaiah Langley
⋅

DE	NT	DE
Delvon Simmons	Antwaun Woods	Greg Townsend Jr.
Noah Jefferson	Cody Temple	Claude Pelon
Kenny Bigelow Jr.	Jacob Daniel	Rasheem Green / Malik Dorton

CB
Iman Marshall
Jonathan Lockett
⋅

Offense

WR
JuJu Smith-Schuster
Jalen Greene / De'Quan Hampton
Deontay Burnett

LT	LG	C	RG	RT
Zach Banner	Damien Mama	Khaliel Rodgers	Viane Talamaivao	Chuma Edoga
Jordan Austin	Chris Brown	Nico Falah	Erick Jepsen	⋅
⋅	⋅	⋅	⋅	⋅

TE
Taylor McNamara
Tyler Petite
Connor Spears

WR
Steven Mitchell / Darreus Rogers
Adoree' Jackson #
⋅

QB
Cody Kessler
Max Browne
Sam Darnold/ Conner Sullivan

Key reserves
Christian Tober / George Katrib / David Mellstrom / Robby Kolanz – WR
Daniel Imatorbhebhe / Cyrus Hobbi / Caleb Wilson – TE
Jeff Miller / Kevin Scott / Christian Rector – DL
Out :

Chad Wheeler – OT

Injuries :

Tre Madden (+) – TB
Isaac Whitney (+) – WR
Kevon Seymour (+) – CB
Matt Lopes (+) – DB

Out for Season :

Ajene Harris – WR
Max Tuerk – C
Toa Lobendahn – OG
Cameron Smith – LB
Lamar Dawson – LB

RB
Justin Davis / Ronald Jones II
Dominic Davis
Aca'Cedric Ware

FB
Jahleel Pinner
Soma Vainuku
⋅

Special teams
PK Alex Wood
PK Matt Boermeester
P Kris Albarado
KR Adoree' Jackson & JuJu Smith-Schuster / Justin Davis / Dominic Davis
PR Adoree' Jackson / Steven Mitchell
LS Zach Smith
H Conner Sullivan

2015 USC Football Depth Chart

Freshman : Freshman

Double Position : #

Injured : +

=== Recruiting class ===
College recruiting (2015)
Name	Hometown	School	Height	Weight	Commit date
Iman Marshall #1 CB	Long Beach, California	Long Beach Polytechnic High School	6 ft 1 in (1.85 m)	195 lb (88 kg)	February 04, 2015 (Signed) / February 04, 2015 (Committed)
Iman Marshall #1 CB	Recruit ratings: Scout: Rivals: 247Sports: ESPN:				
Chuma Edoga #3 OT	Powder Springs, Georgia	McEachern High School	6 ft 4 in (1.93 m)	283 lb (128 kg)	January 12, 2015 (Signed) / April 21, 2014 (Committed)
Chuma Edoga #3 OT	Recruit ratings: Scout: Rivals: 247Sports: ESPN:				
Ronald Jones II #1 RB	McKinney, Texas	McKinney North High School	6 ft 0 in (1.83 m)	185 lb (84 kg)	February 04, 2015 (Signed) / January 2, 2015 (Committed)
Ronald Jones II #1 RB	Recruit ratings: Scout: Rivals: 247Sports: ESPN:				
Rasheem Green #8 DT	Gardena, California	Junipero Serra High School	6 ft 5 in (1.96 m)	290 lb (130 kg)	February 04, 2015 (Signed) / February 04, 2015 (Committed)
Rasheem Green #8 DT	Recruit ratings: Scout: Rivals: 247Sports: ESPN:				
John Houston Jr. #1 MLB	Gardena, California	Junipero Serra High School	6 ft 3 in (1.91 m)	207 lb (94 kg)	February 04, 2015 (Signed) / February 04, 2015 (Committed)
John Houston Jr. #1 MLB	Recruit ratings: Scout: Rivals: 247Sports: ESPN:				
Osa Masina #8 OLB	Salt Lake City, Utah	Brighton High School	6 ft 4 in (1.93 m)	233 lb (106 kg)	February 04, 2015 (Signed) / January 23, 2015 (Committed)
Osa Masina #8 OLB	Recruit ratings: Scout: Rivals: 247Sports: ESPN:				
Tyler Petite #2 TE-Y	Moraga, California	Campolindo High School	6 ft 6 in (1.98 m)	223 lb (101 kg)	February 04, 2015 (Signed) / December 12, 2014 (Committed)
Tyler Petite #2 TE-Y	Recruit ratings: Scout: Rivals: 247Sports: ESPN:				
Porter Gustin #7 ATH OLB / S	Salem, Utah	Salem Hills High School	6 ft 4 in (1.93 m)	238 lb (108 kg)	February 04, 2015 (Signed) / February 3, 2015 (Committed)
Porter Gustin #7 ATH OLB / S	Recruit ratings: Scout: Rivals: 247Sports: ESPN:				
Marvell Tell #6 S	Encino, California	Crespi Carmelite High School	6 ft 2 in (1.88 m)	185 lb (84 kg)	February 04, 2015 (Signed) / January 3, 2015 (Committed)
Marvell Tell #6 S	Recruit ratings: Scout: Rivals: 247Sports: ESPN:				
Sam Darnold #8 QB-PP	San Clemente, California	San Clemente High School	6 ft 4 in (1.93 m)	209 lb (95 kg)	February 04, 2015 (Signed) / July 18, 2014 (Committed)
Sam Darnold #8 QB-PP	Recruit ratings: Scout: Rivals: 247Sports: ESPN:				
Ricky Town #10 QB-PP	Ventura, California	Saint Bonaventure High School	6 ft 4 in (1.93 m)	205 lb (93 kg)	January 12, 2015 (Signed) / January 25, 2014 (Committed)
Ricky Town #10 QB-PP	Recruit ratings: Scout: Rivals: 247Sports: ESPN:				
Isaiah Langley #9 ATH (WR / CB)	Pleasanton, California	Foothill High School	6 ft 0 in (1.83 m)	165 lb (75 kg)	February 04, 2015 (Signed) / July 8, 2014 (Committed)
Isaiah Langley #9 ATH (WR / CB)	Recruit ratings: Scout: Rivals: 247Sports: ESPN:				
Jacob Daniel #15 DT	Fresno, California	Clovis North High School	6 ft 4 in (1.93 m)	305 lb (138 kg)	February 04, 2015 (Signed) / May 13, 2014 (Committed)
Jacob Daniel #15 DT	Recruit ratings: Scout: Rivals: 247Sports: ESPN:				
De'Quan Hampton #1 WR (JC)	Compton, California	Long Beach City College	6 ft 4 in (1.93 m)	220 lb (100 kg)	February 04, 2015 (Signed) / June 22, 2014 (Committed)
De'Quan Hampton #1 WR (JC)	Recruit ratings: Scout: Rivals: 247Sports: ESPN:				
Isaac Whitney #5 WR (JC)	Moore, Oklahoma	Riverside Community College	6 ft 4 in (1.93 m)	200 lb (91 kg)	January 12, 2015 (Signed) / December 18, 2014 (Committed)
Isaac Whitney #5 WR (JC)	Recruit ratings: Scout: Rivals: 247Sports: ESPN:				
Ykili Ross #24 ATH (WR / CB)	Riverside, California	Riverside Polytech High School	6 ft 2 in (1.88 m)	190 lb (86 kg)	February 04, 2015 (Signed) / January 3, 2015 (Committed)
Ykili Ross #24 ATH (WR / CB)	Recruit ratings: Scout: Rivals: 247Sports: ESPN:				
Noah Jefferson #25 DT	Las Vegas, Nevada	Liberty High School	6 ft 5 in (1.96 m)	280 lb (130 kg)	February 04, 2015 (Signed) / May 15, 2014 (Committed)
Noah Jefferson #25 DT	Recruit ratings: Scout: Rivals: 247Sports: ESPN:				
Cameron Smith #8 MLB	Granite Bay, California	Granite Bay High School	6 ft 2 in (1.88 m)	236 lb (107 kg)	January 12, 2015 (Signed) / May 21, 2014 (Committed)
Cameron Smith #8 MLB	Recruit ratings: Scout: Rivals: 247Sports: ESPN:				
Aca'Cedric Ware #51 RB	Cedar Hill, Texas	Cedar Hill High School	5 ft 10 in (1.78 m)	175 lb (79 kg)	February 04, 2015 (Signed) / July 28, 2014 (Committed)
Aca'Cedric Ware #51 RB	Recruit ratings: Scout: Rivals: 247Sports: ESPN:				
Kevin Scott #39 DT	Los Angeles	Salesian High School	6 ft 4 in (1.93 m)	255 lb (116 kg)	February 04, 2015 (Signed) / February 04, 2015 (Committed)
Kevin Scott #39 DT	Recruit ratings: Scout: Rivals: 247Sports: ESPN:				
Cole Smith #6 C	Mission Viejo, California	Mission Viejo High School	6 ft 3 in (1.91 m)	260 lb (120 kg)	February 04, 2015 (Signed) / August 19, 2014 (Committed)
Cole Smith #6 C	Recruit ratings: Scout: Rivals: 247Sports: ESPN:				
Christian Rector #55 DE	Los Angeles	Loyola High School	6 ft 4 in (1.93 m)	231 lb (105 kg)	February 04, 2015 (Signed) / August 6, 2014 (Committed)
Christian Rector #55 DE	Recruit ratings: Scout: Rivals: 247Sports: ESPN:				
Roy Hemsley #69 OT	Los Angeles	Windward School	6 ft 5 in (1.96 m)	285 lb (129 kg)	January 12, 2015 (Signed) / May 6, 2014 (Committed)
Roy Hemsley #69 OT	Recruit ratings: Scout: Rivals: 247Sports: ESPN:				
Dominic Davis #99 S -> RB / WR	Mission Hills, California	Bishop Alemany High School	5 ft 10 in (1.78 m)	175 lb (79 kg)	February 04, 2015 (Signed) / October 26, 2014 (Committed)
Dominic Davis #99 S -> RB / WR	Recruit ratings: Scout: Rivals: 247Sports: ESPN:				
Caleb Wilson; TE-Y	Gardena, California	Junipero Serra High School	6 ft 4 in (1.93 m)	214 lb (97 kg)	Walk On 2015 / February 04, 2015 (Signed)
Caleb Wilson; TE-Y	Recruit ratings: Scout: Rivals: 247Sports:				
Clayton Johnston #64 OT	Anaheim, California	Servite High School	6 ft 6 in (1.98 m)	280 lb (130 kg)	Blue Shirts 2016 / July 2, 2014 (Committed)
Clayton Johnston #64 OT	Recruit ratings: Scout: Rivals: 247Sports: ESPN:				
Deontay Burnett #139 WR	Gardena, California	Junipero Serra High School	6 ft 0 in (1.83 m)	151 lb (68 kg)	Blue Shirts 2016 / February 4, 2015 (Committed)
Deontay Burnett #139 WR	Recruit ratings: Scout: Rivals: 247Sports: ESPN:				
Taylor McNamara; TE	San Diego	University of Oklahoma	6 ft 5 in (1.96 m)	245 lb (111 kg)	March 23, 2015 (Transfer)
Taylor McNamara; TE	Recruit ratings: No ratings found				
Daniel Imatorbhebhe; TE	Suwanee, Georgia	University of Florida	6 ft 3 in (1.91 m)	225 lb (102 kg)	Blue Shirt 2016, Will sit out one year / June 24, 2015 (Transfer)
Daniel Imatorbhebhe; TE	Recruit ratings: No ratings found				
Lance Mudd; RB	San Diego	Cal Poly	6 ft 1 in (1.85 m)	200 lb (91 kg)	Will sit out one year / February 3, 2015 (Transfer)
Lance Mudd; RB	Recruit ratings: No ratings found				
Jonathan LaBonty; S	Mission Viejo, California	Cal Poly	6 ft 0 in (1.83 m)	200 lb (91 kg)	Will sit out one year / 2015 (Transfer)
Jonathan LaBonty; S	Recruit ratings: No ratings found				
Jackson Boyer; WR	Chapel Hill, North Carolina	North Carolina	6 ft 3 in (1.91 m)	195 lb (88 kg)	Will sit out one year / 2015 (Transfer)
Jackson Boyer; WR	Recruit ratings: No ratings found				
Wyatt Vinci; OLB	Ridgewood, New Jersey	Diablo Valley JC	6 ft 2 in (1.88 m)	235 lb (107 kg)	Will sit out one year / 2015 (Transfer)
Wyatt Vinci; OLB	Recruit ratings: No ratings found				
Yoofi Quansah; WR	Chino Hills, California	UC San Diego	5 ft 8 in (1.73 m)	165 lb (75 kg)	2015 (Transfer)
Yoofi Quansah; WR	Recruit ratings: No ratings found				
Deion Hart; S	Hacienda Heights, California	Sam Houston State	6 ft 0 in (1.83 m)	195 lb (88 kg)	Will sit out one year / 2015 (Transfer)
Deion Hart; S	Recruit ratings: No ratings found				
Overall recruit ranking: Scout: #1 Rivals: #1 247Sports: #1 ESPN: #3
Note: In many cases, Scout, Rivals, 247Sports, On3, and ESPN may conflict in their listings of height and weight.; In these cases, the average was taken. ESPN grades are on a 100-point scale.; Sources: "2015 Team Ranking". Rivals.com.

=== Scholarship distribution chart ===
Position	Freshman	Sophomore	Junior	Senior	2016 commit 2016 signed
QB 3 (1)	Sam Darnold	Max Browne	–	Cody Kessler	Matt Fink
TB 5	Ronald Jones II; Aca'Cedric Ware; Dominic Davis	–	Justin Davis	Tre Madden	-
FB 2	–	–	–	Soma Vainuku; Jahleel Pinner	-
WR 10 (5)	Jalen Greene; Deontay Burnett	Steven Mitchell Jr. JuJu Smith-Schuster; Ajene Harris	Darreus Rogers; Isaac Whitney; De'Quan Hampton; Christian Tober *	George Katrib *	Velus Jones Jr. Josh Imatorbhebhe; Michael Pittman; Trevon Sidney; Tyler Vaughns
TE 3 (1)	Tyler Petite; Daniel Imatorbhebhe	–	Taylor McNamara	–	Cary Angeline
OL 14 (2)	Jordan Austin; Chris Brown; Chuma Edoga; Roy Hemsley; Cole Smith; Clayton Johnston	Nico Falah; Jordan Austin; Toa Lobendahn; Damien Mama; Viane Talamaivao	Chad Wheeler; Zach Banner	Max Tuerk	Frank Martin II; Nathan Smith
DE 5 (2)	Malik Dorton; Don Hill; Christian Rector; Rasheem Green	–	–	Greg Townsend Jr.	Oluwole Betiku; Liam Jimmons; Keanu Saleapaga
DT 9 (1)	Noah Jefferson; Jacob Daniel; Kevin Scott	Kenny Bigelow Jr.	Jordan Simmons	Antwaun Woods; Cody Temple; Claude Pelon; Delvon Simmons	Keyshon Camp
OLB 7 (1)	Porter Gustin; John Houston Jr.	Uchenna Nwosu	Su'a Cravens; Scott Felix; Jabari Ruffin; Quinton Powell	–	Jordan Iosefa
ILB 6	Cameron Smith; Osa Masina	Olajuwon Tucker	Michael Hutchings	Lamar Dawson; Anthony Sarao	–
CB 5 (1)	Isaiah Langley; Iman Marshall	Adoree' Jackson; Jonathan Lockett	–	Kevon Seymour	T.J. Brock
S 5 (1)	Ykili Ross; Marvell Tell III	Chris Hawkins; John Plattenburg	Leon McQuay III	–	C.J. Pollard
SP 6	–	Matt Boermeester; Chris Tilbey	Zach Smith * Conner Sullivan * Alex Wood *	Kris Albarado	–

redshirt year used / redshirt year eligible / * : Former walk-on

– 85 scholarships permitted, 80 currently allotted to players (Note: Ricky Town is still "counts" for 2015, bringing the total to 81).

– USC added four "blueshirts" that will count towards the class of 2016: Oklahoma transfer TE Taylor McNamara,
Florida transfer TE Daniel Imatorbhebhe, true freshman OL Clayton Johnston and WR Deontay Burnett,
CAL Poly transfer P Chris Tilbey

– Kicker Matt Boermeester blueshirted and counted towards class of 2015.

– With four blueshirts, USC can sign 20 players in the class of 2016.

== 2015 NFL draft ==
Round	Pick	Player	Position	NFL team
1	6	Leonard Williams	Defensive end / Defensive tackle	New York Jets
1	20	Nelson Agholor	Wide receiver	Philadelphia Eagles
4	120 (21)	Josh Shaw	Cornerback / Safety	Cincinnati Bengals
4	125 (26)	Javorius 'Buck' Allen	Running back	Baltimore Ravens
6	198 (22)	Randall Telfer	Tight end	Cleveland Browns
7	219 (2)	Hayes Pullard	Middle Linebacker	Cleveland Browns
UFA	–	J. R. Tavai	Outside linebacker	Tennessee Titans
UFA	–	George Farmer	Wide receiver	Seattle Seahawks
UFA	–	Gerald Bowman	Safety	Baltimore Ravens
UFA	–	Aundrey Walker	Offensive tackle	Miami Dolphins
UFA	–	Andre Heidari	Kicker	Los Angeles Kiss (AFL)

- * : Projected Round

== Schedule ==
Date	Time	Opponent	Rank	Site	TV	Result	Attendance
September 5	8:00 p.m.	Arkansas State*	No. 8	Los Angeles Memorial Coliseum; Los Angeles, CA	P12N	W 55–6	79,809
September 12	5:00 p.m.	Idaho*	No. 8	Los Angeles Memorial Coliseum; Los Angeles, CA	P12N	W 59–9	72,422
September 19	5:00 p.m.	Stanford	No. 6	Los Angeles Memorial Coliseum; Los Angeles, CA (rivalry)	ABC	L 31–41	78,306
September 26	7:30 p.m.	at Arizona State	No. 19	Sun Devil Stadium; Tempe, AZ	ESPN	W 42–14	61,904
October 8	6:00 p.m.	Washington	No. 17	Los Angeles Memorial Coliseum; Los Angeles, CA	ESPN	L 12–17	63,623
October 17	4:30 p.m.	at No. 14 Notre Dame*		Notre Dame Stadium; Notre Dame, IN (Jeweled Shillelagh)	NBC	L 31–41	80,795
October 24	4:30 p.m.	No. 3 Utah		Los Angeles Memorial Coliseum; Los Angeles, CA	FOX	W 42–24	73,435
October 31	12:00 p.m.	at California		California Memorial Stadium; Berkeley, CA	FOX	W 27–21	52,060
November 7	7:30 p.m.	Arizona^{†}		Los Angeles Memorial Coliseum; Los Angeles, CA	ESPN	W 38–30	76,309
November 13	6:00 p.m.	at Colorado		Folsom Field; Boulder, CO	ESPN2	W 27–24	37,905
November 21	12:30 p.m.	at No. 23 Oregon	No. 24	Autzen Stadium; Eugene, OR	ESPN	L 28–48	59,094
November 28	12:30 p.m.	No. 22 UCLA		Los Angeles Memorial Coliseum; Los Angeles, CA (Victory Bell)	ABC/ESPN2	W 40–21	83,602
December 5	4:45 p.m.	vs. No. 7 Stanford	No. 20	Levi's Stadium; Santa Clara, California (Pac-12 Championship Game)	ESPN	L 22–41	58,476
December 30	7:30 p.m.	vs. Wisconsin*	No. 25	Qualcomm Stadium; San Diego (Holiday Bowl)	ESPN	L 21–23	48,329
*Non-conference game; ^{†}Homecoming; Rankings from AP Poll & CFP Rankings (beginning in Week 9) released prior to game.

== Game summaries ==
=== Arkansas State ===
	1	2	3	4	Total
Red Wolves	0	0	6	0	6
#8 Trojans	14	14	14	13	55

Scoring summary

Quarter	Time	Drive			Team	Scoring information	Score	
Quarter	Time	Plays	Yards	TOP	Team	Scoring information	ARST	USC
1	13:58	4	77	1:14	USC	JuJu Smith-Schuster 61-yard touchdown reception from Cody Kessler, Alex Wood kick good	0	7
"TOP" = time of possession. For other American football terms, see Glossary of American football.							6	55

- (Q1, 0:03) USC – #7 Steven Mitchell Jr. 14 yard pass from #6 Cody Kessler, (#39 Alex Wood kick) – USC 14–0
- (Q2, 9:38) USC – #23 Tre Madden 65 yard run, (#39 Alex Wood kick) – USC 21–0
- (Q2, 4:40) USC – #48 Taylor McNamara 2 yard pass from #6 Cody Kessler, (#39 Alex Wood kick) – USC28–0
- (Q3, 13:07) Arkansas State – #34 Michael Gordon 9 yard run – USC 28–6
- (Q3, 6:28) USC – #23 Tre Madden 8 yard pass from #6 Cody Kessler, (#39 Alex Wood kick) – USC 35–6
- (Q3, 3:46) USC – #25 Ronald Jones II 44 yard run, (#39 Alex Wood kick) – USC 42–6
- (Q4, 10:26) USC – #58 Osa Masina 46 yard fumble return, (#39 Alex Wood kick blocked) – USC 48–6
- (Q4, 4:21) USC – #28 Aca'Cedric Ware 6 yard run, (#39 Alex Wood kick) – USC 55–6

=== Idaho ===
	1	2	3	4	Total
Vandals	0	3	6	0	9
#8 Trojans	21	17	14	7	59

- (Q1, 12:57) USC – #22 Justin Davis 1 yard run, (#39 Alex Wood kick) – USC 7–0
- (Q1, 09:28) USC – #22 Justin Davis 7 yard run, (#39 Alex Wood kick) – USC 14–0
- (Q1, 04:25) USC – #9 JuJu Smith-Schuster 50 yard pass from #6 Cody Kessler, (#39 Alex Wood kick) – USC 21–0
- (Q2, 15:00) Idaho – #5 Austin Rehkow 21 yard Field Goal – USC 21–3
- (Q2, 12:05) USC – #23 Tre Madden 7 yard run, (#39 Alex Wood kick) – USC 28–3
- (Q2, 05:48) USC – #23 Tre Madden 10 yard run, (#39 Alex Wood kick) – USC 35–3
- (Q2, 0:25) USC – #39 Alex Wood 24 yard Field Goal – USC 38–3
- (Q3, 09:41) Idaho – #13 Bobby Cowan 10 yard pass from #10 Matt Linehan – USC 38–9
- (Q3, 08:04) USC – #15 Isaac Whitney 28 yard pass from #6 Cody Kessler, (#39 Alex Wood kick) – USC 45–9
- (Q3, 03:53) USC – #9 JuJu Smith-Schuster 41 yard pass from #6 Cody Kessler, (#39 Alex Wood kick) – USC 52–9
- (Q4, 07:32) USC – #25 Ronald Jones II 1 yard run, (#39 Alex Wood kick) – USC 59–9

=== Stanford ===
	1	2	3	4	Total
Cardinal	7	17	7	10	41
#6 Trojans	14	7	7	3	31

- (Q1, 12:09) USC – #23 Tre Madden 1 yard run, (#39 Alex Wood kick) – USC 7–0
- (Q1, 02:55) STA – #18 Austin Hooper 15 yard pass from #8 Kevin Hogan, (#34 Conrad Ukropina kick) – USC 7–7
- (Q1, 01:00) USC – #7 Steven Mitchell Jr. 6 yard pass from #6 Cody Kessler, (#39 Alex Wood kick) – USC 14–7
- (Q2, 12:44) STA – #34 Conrad Ukropina 42 yard Field Goal – USC 14–10
- (Q2, 09:49) USC – #9 JuJu Smith-Schuster 54 yard pass from #6 Cody Kessler, (#39 Alex Wood kick) – USC 21–10
- (Q2, 04:21) STA – #22 Remound Wright 1 yard run, (#34 Conrad Ukropina kick) – USC 21–17
- (Q2, 00:03) STA – #89 Devon Cajuste 17 yard pass from #8 Kevin Hogan, (#34 Conrad Ukropina kick) – STA 24–21
- (Q3, 10:14) USC – #7 Steven Mitchell Jr. 1 yard pass from #6 Cody Kessler, (#39 Alex Wood kick) – USC 28–24
- (Q3, 04:59) STA – #22 Remound Wright 1 yard run, (#34 Conrad Ukropina kick) – STA 31–28
- (Q4, 11:25) STA – #22 Remound Wright 1 yard run, (#34 Conrad Ukropina kick) – STA 38–28
- (Q4, 9:25) USC – #39 Alex Wood 36 yard Field Goal – STA 38–31
- (Q4, 2:27) STA – #34 Conrad Ukropina 46 yard Field Goal – STA 41–31

=== Arizona State ===
	1	2	3	4	Total
#19 Trojans	7	28	0	7	42
Sun Devils	0	0	7	7	14

- (Q1, 10:44) USC – #2 Adoree' Jackson 80 yard pass from #6 Cody Kessler, (#39 Alex Wood kick) – USC 7–0
- (Q2, 11:29) USC – #7 Steven Mitchell Jr. 27 yard pass from #6 Cody Kessler, (#39 Alex Wood kick) – USC 14–0
- (Q2, 03:44) USC – #9 JuJu Smith-Schuster 4 yard pass from #6 Cody Kessler, (#39 Alex Wood kick) – USC 21–0
- (Q2, 00:40) USC – #4 Chris Hawkins 94 yard fumble return, (#39 Alex Wood kick) – USC 28–0
- (Q2, 00:07) USC – #9 JuJu Smith-Schuster 10 yard pass from #6 Cody Kessler, (#39 Alex Wood kick) – USC 35–0
- (Q3, 02:05) ASU – #4 Demario Richard 1 yard run, (#5 Zane Gonzalez kick) – USC 35–7
- (Q4, 10:47) USC – #15 Isaac Whitney 10 yard pass from #6 Cody Kessler, (#39 Alex Wood kick) – USC 42–7
- (Q4, 07:48) ASU – #4 Demario Richard 4 yard run, (#5 Zane Gonzalez kick) – USC 42–14

=== Washington ===
	1	2	3	4	Total
Huskies	0	3	7	7	17
#17 Trojans	3	3	0	6	12

- (Q1, 1:47) USC – #39 Alex Wood 34 yard Field Goal – USC 3–0
- (Q2, 9:54) WAS – #48 Cameron Van Winkle 21 yard Field Goal – USC 3–3
- (Q2, 0:00) USC – #39 Alex Wood 21 yard Field Goal – USC 6–3
- (Q3, 11:24) WAS – #82 Joshua Perkins 27 yard pass from #16 Marvin Hall, (#48 Cameron Van Winkle kick) – WAS 10–6
- (Q4, 14:21) WAS – #9 Myles Gaskin 1 yard run, (#48 Cameron Van Winkle kick) – WAS 17–6
- (Q4, 12:02) USC – #25 Ronald Jones II 1 yard run, (#6 Cody Kessler pass failed) – WAS 17–12

=== Notre Dame ===
	1	2	3	4	Total
Trojans	10	14	7	0	31
#14 Fighting Irish	21	3	0	17	41

- (Q1, 11:59) USC – #6 Cody Kessler 3 yard run, (#39 Alex Wood kick) – USC 7–0
- (Q1, 11:49) ND – #7 Will Fuller 75 yard pass from #14 DeShone Kizer, (#19 Justin Yoon kick) – 7–7
- (Q1, 8:52) USC – #39 Alex Wood 42 yard Field Goal – USC 10–7
- (Q1, 6:50) ND – #20 C. J. Prosise 25 yard run, (#19 Justin Yoon kick) – ND 14–10
- (Q1, 5:04) ND – #17 Kris Albarado punt blocked, #3 Amir Carlisle 5 yard run, (#19 Justin Yoon kick) – ND 21–10
- (Q2, 6:03) ND – #19 Justin Yoon 32 yard Field Goal – ND 24–10
- (Q2, 5:52) USC – #9 JuJu Smith-Schuster 75 yard pass from #10 Jalen Greene, (#39 Alex Wood kick) – ND 24–17
- (Q2, 3:31) USC – #2 Adoree' Jackson 83 yard pass from #6 Cody Kessler, (#39 Alex Wood kick) – 24–24
- (Q3, 9:45) USC – #48 Taylor McNamara 4 yard pass from #6 Cody Kessler, (#39 Alex Wood kick) – USC 31–24
- (Q4, 14:26) ND – #20 C.J. Prosise 4 yard run, (#19 Justin Yoon kick) – 31–31
- (Q4, 9:06) ND – #88 Corey Robinson 10 yard pass from #14 DeShone Kizer, (#19 Justin Yoon kick) – ND 38–31
- (Q4, 5:39) ND – #19 Justin Yoon 32 yard Field Goal – ND 41–31

=== Utah ===
	1	2	3	4	Total
#3 Utes	14	3	0	7	24
Trojans	7	21	7	7	42

- (Q1, 8:06) USC – #22 Justin Davis 9 yard run (#39 Alex Wood kick) – USC 7–0
- (Q1, 3:53) UTAH – #18 Britain Covey 30 yard pass from #7 Travis Wilson (#39 Andy Phillips kick) – 7–7
- (Q1, 1:49) UTAH – #8 Bubba Poole 2 yard run (#39 Andy Phillips kick) – UTAH 14–7
- (Q2, 9:47) USC – #31 Soma Vainuku 1 yard run (#39 Alex Wood kick) – 14–14
- (Q2, 3:40) USC – #25 Ronald Jones II 18 yard run (#39 Alex Wood kick) – USC 21–14
- (Q2, 1:07) USC – #35 Cameron Smith 54 yard interception run (#39 Alex Wood kick) – USC 28–14
- (Q2, 0:05) UTAH – #39 Andy Phillips 53 yard Field Goal – USC 28–17
- (Q3, 3:37) USC – #6 Cody Kessler 1 yard run (#39 Alex Wood kick) – USC 35–17
- (Q4, 9:58) USC – #9 JuJu Smith-Schuster 25 yard pass from #6 Cody Kessler (#39 Alex Wood kick) – USC 42–17
- (Q4, 4:00) UTAH – #18 Britain Covey 66 yard pass from #7 Travis Wilson (#39 Andy Phillips kick) – USC 42–24

=== California ===
	1	2	3	4	Total
Trojans	0	10	17	0	27
Golden Bears	7	0	7	7	21

- (Q1, 7:05) CAL – #1 Bryce Treggs 6 yard pass from #16 Jared Goff (#9 Matt Anderson kick) – CAL 7–0
- (Q2, 13:32) USC – #25 Ronald Jones II 13 yard run (#39 Alex Wood kick) – USC 7–7
- (Q2, 0:11) USC – #39 Alex Wood 22 yard Field Goal – USC 10–7
- (Q3, 9:50) USC – #23 Tre Madden 2 yard run, (#39 Alex Wood kick) – USC 17–7
- (Q3, 9:40) USC – #2 Adoree' Jackson 46 yard interception run (#39 Alex Wood kick) – USC 24–7
- (Q3, 5:46) CAL – #2 Daniel Lasco 6 yard run (#9 Matt Anderson kick) – USC 24–14
- (Q3, 1:47) USC – #39 Alex Wood 43 yard Field Goal – USC 27–14
- (Q4, 3:56) CAL – #89 Stephen Anderson 9 yard pass from #16 Jared Goff (#9 Matt Anderson kick) – USC 27–21

=== Arizona ===
	1	2	3	4	Total
Wildcats	7	10	3	10	30
Trojans	0	17	0	21	38

- (Q1, 5:53) AZ – #6 Nate Phillips 9 yard pass from #12 Anu Solomon (#41 Casey Skowron kick) – AZ 7–0
- (Q2, 15:00) AZ – #4 David Richards 2 yard pass from #12 Anu Solomon (#41 Casey Skowron kick) – AZ 14–0
- (Q2, 11:39) USC – #39 Alex Wood 25 yard Field Goal – AZ 14–3
- (Q2, 9:25) USC – #9 JuJu Smith-Schuster 72 yard pass from #6 Cody Kessler (#39 Alex Wood kick) – AZ 14–10
- (Q2, 8:16) AZ – #41 Casey Skowron 37 yard Field Goal – AZ 17–10
- (Q2, 3:02) USC – #25 Ronald Jones II 5 yard pass from #6 Cody Kessler (#39 Alex Wood kick) – USC 17–17
- (Q3, 10:56) AZ – #41 Casey Skowron 41 yard Field Goal – AZ 20–17
- (Q4, 15:00) USC – #22 Justin Davis 9 yard run (#39 Alex Wood kick) – USC 24–20
- (Q4, 10:09) AZ – #41 Casey Skowron 44 yard Field Goal – USC 24–23
- (Q4, 9:37) USC – #25 Ronald Jones II 74 yard run (#39 Alex Wood kick) – USC 31–23
- (Q4, 2:42) USC – #22 Justin Davis 15 yard run (#39 Alex Wood kick) – USC 38–23
- (Q4, 0:16) AZ – #1 Cayleb Jones 1 yard pass from #12 Anu Solomon (#41 Casey Skowron kick) – USC 38–30

=== Colorado ===
	1	2	3	4	Total
Trojans	3	3	14	7	27
Buffaloes	7	10	0	7	24

- (Q1, 10:35) USC – #39 Alex Wood 22 yard Field Goal – USC 3–0
- (Q1, 5:15) COL – #23 Phillip Lindsay 4 yard run (#10 Diego Gonzalez kick) – COL 7–3
- (Q2, 9:28) COL – #22 Nelson Spruce 9 yard pass from #15 Cade Apsay (#10 Diego Gonzalez kick) – COL 14–3
- (Q2, 3:14) COL – #10 Diego Gonzalez 28 yard Field Goal – COL 17–3
- (Q2, 0:00) USC – #39 Alex Wood 41 yard Field Goal – COL 17–6
- (Q3, 5:34) USC – #38 Jahleel Pinner 4 yard pass from #6 Cody Kessler (#39 Alex Wood kick) – COL 17–13
- (Q3, 2:32) USC – #48 Taylor McNamara 2 yard pass from #6 Cody Kessler (#39 Alex Wood kick) – USC 20–17
- (Q4, 13:55) USC – #9 JuJu Smith-Schuster 36 yard pass from #6 Cody Kessler (#39 Alex Wood kick) – USC 27–17
- (Q4, 6:13) COL – #18 George Frazier 1 yard pass from #15 Cade Apsay (#10 Diego Gonzalez kick) – USC 27–24

=== Oregon ===
	1	2	3	4	Total
#24 Trojans	7	7	14	0	28
#23 Ducks	14	17	7	10	48

- (Q1, 7:34) ORE – #2 Bralon Addison 48 yard pass from #3 Vernon Adams (#41 Aidan Schneider kick) – ORE 7–0
- (Q1, 2:04) USC – #1 Darreus Rogers 27 yard pass from #6 Cody Kessler (#36 Matt Boermeester kick) – USC 7–7
- (Q1, 1:46) ORE – #81 Evan Baylis 52 yard pass from #3 Vernon Adams Jr. (#41 Aidan Schneider kick) – ORE 14–7
- (Q2, 12:20) USC – #82 Tyler Petite 12 yard pass from #6 Cody Kessler (#36 Matt Boermeester kick) – USC 14–14
- (Q2, 6:46) ORE – #7 Darren Carrington 37 yard pass from #3 Vernon Adams Jr. (#41 Aidan Schneider kick) – ORE 21–14
- (Q2, 2:47) ORE – #29 Kani Benoit 30 yard pass from #3 Vernon Adams Jr. (#41 Aidan Schneider kick) – ORE 28–14
- (Q2, 0:06) ORE – #41 Aidan Schneider 37 yard Field Goal – ORE 31–14
- (Q3, 11:33) ORE – #88 Dwayne Stanford 21 yard pass from #3 Vernon Adams Jr. (#41 Aidan Schneider kick) – ORE 38–14
- (Q3, 9:48) USC – #25 Ronald Jones II 12 yard run (#36 Matt Boermeester kick) – ORE 38–21
- (Q3, 1:48) USC – #2 Adoree' Jackson 41 yard punt return (#36 Matt Boermeester kick) – ORE 38–28
- (Q4, 12:57) ORE – #6 Charles Nelson 26 yard pass from #3 Vernon Adams Jr. (#41 Aidan Schneider kick) – ORE 45–28
- (Q4, 7:00) ORE – #41 Aidan Schneider 22 yard Field Goal – ORE 48–28

=== UCLA ===
	1	2	3	4	Total
#22 Bruins	7	7	7	0	21
Trojans	3	17	13	7	40

- (Q1, 7:58) USC – #39 Alex Wood 30 yard Field Goal – USC 3–0
- (Q1, 3:32) UCLA – #24 Paul Perkins 19 yard run (#15 Kaʻimi Fairbairn kick) – UCLA 7–3
- (Q2, 12:06) USC – #6 Cody Kessler 1 yard run (#39 Alex Wood kick) – USC 10–7
- (Q2, 9:49) UCLA – #18 Thomas Duarte 19 yard pass from #3 Josh Rosen (#15 Kaʻimi Fairbairn kick) – UCLA 14–10
- (Q2, 2:51) USC – #39 Alex Wood 21 yard Field Goal – UCLA 14–13
- (Q2, 1:56) USC – #2 Adoree' Jackson 42 yard punt return (#39 Alex Wood kick) – USC 20–14
- (Q3, 8:42) UCLA – #24 Paul Perkins 1 yard run (#15 Kaʻimi Fairbairn kick) – UCLA 21–20
- (Q3, 7:27) USC – #94 Rasheem Greene 31 yard fumble return, (2pts failed) – USC 26–21
- (Q3, 1:57) USC – #1 Darreus Rogers 21 yard pass from #6 Cody Kessler (#39 Alex Wood kick) – USC 33–21
- (Q4, 6:24) USC – #48 Taylor McNamara 8 yard pass from #6 Cody Kessler (#39 Alex Wood kick) – USC 40–21

=== Pac-12 Championship Game ===
	1	2	3	4	Total
#20 Trojans	0	3	13	6	22
#7 Cardinal	3	10	14	14	41

- (Q1, 9:13) STA – #34 Conrad Ukropina 30 yard Field Goal – STA 3–0
- (Q2, 15:00) STA – #8 Kevin Hogan 11 yard pass from #5 Christian McCaffrey, (#34 Conrad Ukropina kick) – STA 10–0
- (Q2, 8:35) STA – #34 Conrad Ukropina 23 yard Field Goal – STA 13–0
- (Q2, 0:15) USC – #39 Alex Wood 40 yard Field Goal – STA 13–3
- (Q3, 11:56) USC – #38 Jahleel Pinner 1 yard pass from #6 Cody Kessler (#39 Alex Wood kick blocked) – STA 13–9
- (Q3, 5:28) USC – #25 Ronald Jones II 27 yard run (#39 Alex Wood kick) – USC 16–13
- (Q3, 3:16) STA – #8 Kevin Hogan 7 yard run (#34 Conrad Ukropina kick) – STA 20–16
- (Q3, 0:14) STA – #90 Solomon Thomas 30 yard fumble return, (#34 Conrad Ukropina kick) – STA 27–16
- (Q4, 12:35) USC – #6 Cody Kessler 12 yard run (2pts failed) – STA 27–22
- (Q4, 6:43) STA – #5 Christian McCaffrey 28 yard pass from #8 Kevin Hogan, (#34 Conrad Ukropina kick) – STA 34–22
- (Q4, 1:44) STA – #5 Christian McCaffrey 10 yard run – STA 41–22

=== Holiday Bowl ===
	1	2	3	4	Total
#25 Trojans	0	7	7	7	21
Badgers	0	13	7	3	23

- (Q2, 13:34) WIS – #10 Rafael Gaglianone 28 yard Field Goal – WIS 3–0
- (Q2, 9:28) WIS – #6 Corey Clement 6 yard run (#10 Rafael Gaglianone kick) – WIS 10–0
- (Q2, 5:20) USC – #22 Justin Davis 1 yard run (#39 Alex Wood kick) – WIS 10–7
- (Q2, 0:30) WIS – #10 Rafael Gaglianone 33 yard Field Goal – WIS 13–7
- (Q3, 7:54) WIS – #2 Joel Stave 4 yard pass from #46 Austin Traylor, (#10 Rafael Gaglianone kick) – WIS 20–7
- (Q3, 5:38) USC – #22 Justin Davis 4 yard run (#39 Alex Wood kick) – WIS 20–14
- (Q4, 10:28) USC – #1 Darreus Rogers 7 yard pass from #6 Cody Kessler, (#39 Alex Wood kick) – USC 21–20
- (Q4, 2:31) WIS – #10 Rafael Gaglianone 29 yard Field Goal – WIS 23–21

== Rankings ==
Ranking movements Legend: ██ Increase in ranking ██ Decrease in ranking — = Not ranked RV = Received votes
	Week															
Poll	Pre	1	2	3	4	5	6	7	8	9	10	11	12	13	14	Final
AP	8	8	6	19	17	17	RV	—	RV	RV	RV	22	RV	24	RV	RV
Coaches	10	10	7	18	16	17	RV	—	RV	RV	RV	24	RV	24	RV	RV
CFP	Not released									—	—	24	—	20	25	Not released

== Statistics ==
=== Team ===
As of 11/22/2015.

Team statistics
	USC	Opponents
Scoring & Efficiency
Points	432	296
Total Time Possession	–	–
Average Time Per Game	30:11	29:49
First Downs	267	267
Rushing	113	100
Passing	136	141
Penalty	18	26
3rd–Down Conversions	65/164	55/160
4th–Down Conversions	14/21	6/18
Red Zone Scoring	44/50	37/42
Red Zone Touchdowns	34/50	27/42
Penalties – Yards	90–841	59–527
Yards Per Game	70.1	43.9
Offense
Total Offense	5,488	4,800
Total Plays	860	845
Average Plays Per Game	72	70
Average Yards Per Play	6.4	5.7
Average Per Yards Game	457.3	400.0
Rushing Yards	2,120	1,651
Rushing Attempts	467	430
Average Per Rush	4.5	3.8
Average Per Game	176.7	137.6
Rushing TDs	22	14
Passing Yards	3,368	3,149
Comp–Att	269–393	260–415
Comp %	68.4	62.7
Average Per Pass	8.6	7.6
Average Per Catch	12.5	12.1
Average Per Game	280.7	262.4
Passing TDs	28	22
Interceptions	6	14
Defense
INT Returns: # – Yards	14–284	6–42
INT Touchdowns	2	1*
Fumbles Recovered: # – Yards	9–171	4–0
Fumble recovery Touchdowns	3	0
QB Sacks: # – Yards	36–240	31–200
Touchdowns	5	1
Safeties	0	0
Special teams
Kickoffs: # – Yards	78–4,819	62–3,615
Average Yards Per Kick	61.8	58.3
Net Kick Average	41.8	39.4
Touchbacks	10	15
Onside Kicks: # – Recovered	0–1	1–0
Punts: # – Yards	58–2,326	63–2,673
Average Yards Per Punt	40.1	42.4
Net Punt Average	35.5	37.4
Kickoff Returns: # – Yards	41–797	63–1,286
Average Yards Per Return	19.4	20.4
Kickoff return Touchdowns	0	0
Punt Returns: # – Yards	26–254	15–207
Average Yards Per Return	9.8	13.8
Punt return Touchdowns	2	1
Field Goals: # – Attempts	12–16	13–18
Longest Field Goal: Yards	43	53
PAT: # – Attempts	54–55	35–36

Non-conference opponents

	1	2	3	4	Total
USC	45	45	35	20	145
All opponents	21	6	12	17	56

Pac-12 opponents

	1	2	3	4	Total
USC	44	113	72	58	287
Pac-12 opponents	63	67	45	65	240

=== Offense ===
Passing statistics
#	NAME	POS	RAT	CMP	ATT	YDS	AVG	CMP%	TD	INT	LONG
6	Cody Kessler	QB	158.6	258	377	3,128	8.1	68.4	27	6	83
4	Max Browne	QB	145.8	8	12	113	9.4	66.7	0	0	35
14	Sam Darnold	QB	0	0	0	0	0	0	0	0	0
10	Jalen Greene	WR-QB	424.2	3	4	127	31.75	75.0	1	0	75
15	Michael Bowman	QB	0	0	0	0	0	0	0	0	0
19	Conner Sullivan	QB	0	0	0	0	0	0	0	0	0
	TOTALS		160.9	269	393	3,368	8.0	68.4	28	6	83
	OPPONENTS		137.1	260	415	3,149	8.2	62.7	22	14	75

Rushing statistics
#	NAME	POS	CAR	YDS	AVG	LONG	TD
25	Ronald Jones II	TB	139	890	6.4	74	7
22	Justin Davis	TB	140	776	5.5	43	5
23	Tre Madden	TB	84	540	5.4	65	5
16	Dominic Davis	TB-WR	14	69	4.9	19	0
28	Aca'Cedric Ware	TB	12	36	3.0	9	1
31	Soma Vainuku	FB	2	4	2.0	3	1
38	Jahleel Pinner	FB	0	0	0	0	0
26	James Toland IV	TB	3	23	7.7	17	0
24	Stefan Smith	TB	3	14	4.7	0	0
27	Lance Mudd	TB	0	0	0	0	0
9	JuJu Smith-Schuster	WR	1	4	4.0	4	0
2	Adoree' Jackson	CB-WR	5	8	1.6	6	0
–	Team	–	12	−27	−2.2	0	0
6	Cody Kessler	QB	49	−124	−2.5	21	3
19	Conner Sullivan	QB	1	−4	−4.0	0	0
10	Jalen Greene	WR-QB	2	1	0.5	0	0
	TOTALS		467	2,120	4.5	74	22
	OPPONENTS		430	1,651	3.8	61	14

Receiving statistics
#	NAME	POS	REC	YDS	AVG	LONG	TD
9	JuJu Smith-Schuster	WR	74	1,302	17.6	75	10
7	Steven Mitchell Jr.	WR	32	269	8.4	28	4
1	Darreus Rogers	WR	22	229	10.4	27	2
15	Isaac Whitney	WR	8	112	14.0	31	2
89	De'Quan Hampton	WR	15	165	11.0	29	0
10	Jalen Greene	WR-QB	10	104	10.4	16	0
80	Deontay Burnett	WR	9	148	16.4	34	0
29	Chris Tober	WR	2	10	5.0	6	0
83	George Katrib	WR	0	0	0	0	0
85	David Mellstrom	WR	1	18	18.0	18	0
86	Robby Kolanz	WR	1	1	1.0	1	0
34	Yoofi Quansah	WR	0	0	0	0	0
84	Jackson Boyer	WR	0	0	0	0	0
48	Taylor McNamara	TE	10	62	6.2	16	4
81	Connor Spears	TE	0	0	0	0	0
82	Tyler Petite	TE	13	119	9.2	18	1
47	Cyrus Hobbi	TE	0	0	0	0	0
87	Caleb Wilson	TE	0	0	0	0	0
23	Tre Madden	TB	16	128	8.0	30	1
22	Justin Davis	TB	16	169	10.6	23	0
25	Ronald Jones II	TB	6	27	4.5	15	1
16	Dominic Davis	TB-WR	7	102	14.6	35	0
38	Jahleel Pinner	FB	3	21	7.0	9	1
2	Adoree' Jackson	CB-WR	24	382	15.9	83	2
	TOTALS		269	3,368	12.5	83	28
	OPPONENTS		260	3149	12.1	75	22

=== Defense ===
Defense statistics
#	NAME	POS	SOLO	AST	TOT	TFL-YDS	SACK-YDS	INT-YDS	BU	PD	QBH	FF	FR-YDS	BLK	SAF	TD
52	Delvon Simmons	DL	25	20	45	8.5–48	4.0–33	–	1	1	1	2	–	1	–	–
91	Noah Jefferson	DL	11	8	19	–	–	–	–	–	–	–	–	–	–	–
95	Kenny Bigelow Jr.	DL	6	3	9	3.0–19	3.0–19	–	1	1	–	–	–	–	–	–
98	Cody Temple	DL	3	1	4	–	–	–	–	–	–	–	–	–	–	–
99	Antwaun Woods	DL	9	21	30	6.0–20	3.0–16	–	–	–	2	–	1–0	–	–	–
92	Jacob Daniel	DL	–	3	3	–	–	–	1	1	–	–	–	–	–	–
53	Kevin Scott	DL	–	–	–	–	–	–	–	–	–	–	–	–	–	–
90	Claude Pelon	DL	6	10	16	2.5–13	1.5–12	–	–	–	1	1	–	1	–	–
93	Greg Townsend Jr.	DL	16	25	41	5.5–13	2.0–4	–	–	–	–	–	–	–	–	–
94	Rasheem Green	DL	6	9	15	1.0–4	0.5–3	–	–	–	–	–	1–31	–	–	1
68	Jordan Simmons	DL	–	–	–	–	–	–	–	–	–	–	–	–	–	–
79	Jeff Miller	DL	–	–	–	–	–	–	–	–	–	–	–	–	–	–
89	Christian Rector	DL	–	–	–	–	–	–	–	–	–	–	–	–	–	–
44	Malik Dorton	DL-LB	1	1	2	–	–	–	–	–	–	–	–	–	–	–
59	Don Hill	DL-LB	2	4	6	0.5–1	–	–	–	–	–	–	–	–	–	–
21	Su'a Cravens	LB	43	30	73	13.5–51	5.5–33	2–32	6	8	1	2	–	–	–	–
10	John Houston Jr.	LB	–	–	–	–	–	–	–	–	–	–	–	–	–	–
18	Quinton Powell	LB	4	6	10	–	–	–	–	–	–	1	–	–	–	–
19	Michael Hutchings	LB	5	8	13	–	–	–	–	–	1	–	–	–	–	–
34	Olajuwon Tucker	LB	13	9	22	3.5–22	2.5–21	–	–	–	–	–	–	–	–	–
35	Cameron Smith	LB	45	33	78	1.0–9	1.0–9	3–122	3	6	–	–	1–0	–	–	1
40	Jabari Ruffin	LB	3	8	11	–	–	–	–	–	–	1	–	–	–	–
42	Uchenna Nwosu	LB	10	11	21	–	–	–	1	1	1	–	–	–	–	–
45	Porter Gustin	LB	11	10	21	6.0–39	4.5–33	–	–	–	1	–	–	–	–	–
47	Scott Felix	LB	12	14	26	5.5–37	4.0–31	–	–	–	–	–	1–0	–	–	–
55	Lamar Dawson	LB	15	16	31	1.0–3	0.5–2	–	2	2	–	1	–	–	–	–
56	Anthony Sarao	LB	28	17	45	5.0–18	3.0–14	–	–	–	3	–	–	–	–	–
58	Osa Masina	LB	17	8	25	1.5–4	–	–	–	–	1	–	1–46	–	–	1
50	Grant Moore	LB	–	1	1	–	–	–	–	–	–	–	–	–	–	–
51	Joel Foy	LB	–	1	1	–	–	–	–	–	–	–	–	–	–	–
54	Reuben Peters	LB	1	5	6	–	–	–	–	–	–	–	–	–	–	–
2	Adoree' Jackson	CB	20	9	29	–	–	1–46	4	5	–	1	–	–	–	1
8	Iman Marshall	CB	32	24	56	–	–	3–15	7	10	–	–	–	–	–	–
13	Kevon Seymour	CB	15	5	20	1.0–1	–	1–27	–	1	–	–	–	–	–	–
14	Isaiah Langley	CB	7	2	9	–	–	–	1	1	–	–	–	–	–	–
23	Jonathan Lockett	CB	17	1	18	–	–	–	–	–	–	–	–	–	–	–
28	Ryan Dillard	CB	–	–	–	–	–	–	–	–	–	–	–	–	–	–
29	Kevin Carrasco	CB	–	–	–	–	–	–	–	–	–	–	–	–	–	–
38	Jalen Jones	CB	–	–	–	–	–	–	–	–	–	–	–	–	–	–
4	Chris Hawkins	S	34	20	54	0.5–3	–	2–20	–	2	–	–	2–94	–	–	1
7	Marvell Tell III	S	15	6	21	1.0–2	–	–	3	3	–	–	–	–	–	–
22	Leon McQuay III	S	10	8	18	1.5–3	–	–	3	3	–	1	1–0	–	–	–
24	John Plattenburg	S	20	11	31	3.5–21	1.0–10	2–22	–	2	–	–	–	–	–	–
26	Davonte Nunnery	S	–	–	–	–	–	–	–	–	–	–	–	–	–	–
30	Ykili Ross	S	–	–	–	–	–	–	–	–	–	–	–	–	–	–
36	Joe Harding	S	–	–	–	–	–	–	–	–	–	–	–	–	–	–
37	Matt Lopes	S	8	6	14	1.5–1	–	–	–	–	–	–	–	–	–	–
27	Jonathan LaBonty	S	–	–	–	–	–	–	–	–	–	–	–	–	–	–
–	Team	–	3	–	3	3.0–8	–	–	–	–	–	–	–	–	–	–
31	Soma Vainuku	FB	7	6	13	–	–	–	–	–	–	–	1–0	–	–	–
83	George Katrib	WR	5	1	6	–	–	–	–	–	–	–	–	–	–	–
26	James Toland IV	TB	–	5	5	–	–	–	–	–	–	–	–	–	–	–
39	Alex Wood	K	1	1	2	–	–	–	–	–	–	–	–	–	–	–
17	Kris Albarado	P	–	1	1	–	–	–	–	–	–	–	–	–	–	–
36	Matt Boermeester	K	1	–	1	–	–	–	–	–	–	–	–	–	–	–
73	Zach Banner	OT	1	–	1	–	–	–	–	–	–	–	–	–	–	–
51	Damien Mama	OG	1	–	1	–	–	–	–	–	–	–	–	–	–	–
89	De'Quan Hampton	WR	1	–	1	–	–	–	–	–	–	–	–	–	–	–
9	JuJu Smith-Schuster	WR	1	–	1	–	–	–	–	–	–	–	–	–	–	–
6	Cody Kessler	QB	1	–	1	–	–	–	–	–	–	–	–	–	–	–
	TOTAL		492	388	880	76–340	36–240	14–284	33	47	12	10	9–171	2	0	5
	OPPONENTS		515	414	929	81–327	31–200	6–42	27	33	21	6	4–0	3	0	0

Key: POS: Position, SOLO: Solo Tackles, AST: Assisted Tackles, TOT: Total Tackles, TFL: Tackles-for-loss, SACK: Quarterback Sacks, INT: Interceptions, BU: Passes Broken Up, PD: Passes Defended, QBH: Quarterback Hits, FF: Forced Fumbles, FR: Fumbles Recovered, BLK: Kicks or Punts Blocked, SAF: Safeties, TD : Touchdown

=== Special teams ===
Kicking statistics
#	NAME	POS	XPM	XPA	XP%	FGM	FGA	FG%	1–19	20–29	30–39	40–49	50+	LNG	PTS
39	Alex Wood	PK	50	51	98.0	12	16	75.0	0/0	6/6	3/6	3/4	0/0	43	86
39	Matt Boermeester	PK	4	4	100.0	0	0	0	0/0	0/0	0/0	0/0	0/0	0	4
46	Wyatt Schmidt	PK	0	0	0	0	0	0	0/0	0/0	0/0	0/0	0/0	0	0
	TOTALS		54	55	98.2	12	16	75.0	0/0	6/6	3/6	3/4	0/0	43	90
	OPPONENTS		35	36	97.2	13	18	72.2	0/0	4/4	5/6	3/5	1/3	53	80

Kickoff statistics
#	NAME	POS	KICKS	YDS	AVG	TB	OB
39	Alex Wood	PK	65	4,014	61.8	10	4
39	Matt Boermeester	PK	13	805	61.9	1	0
46	Wyatt Schmidt	PK	0	0	0	0	0
	TOTALS		78	4,819	61.8	11	4
	OPPONENTS		62	3,615	58.3	15	5

Punting statistics
#	NAME	POS	PUNTS	YDS	AVG	LONG	TB	I–20	50+	BLK
17	Kris Albarado	P	56	2,308	41.2	56	3	13	7	0
36	Chris Tilbey	P	0	0	0	0	0	0	0	0
46	Reid Budrovich	P	0	0	0	0	0	0	0	0
–	Team	–	2	18	9.0	18	0	0	0	2
	TOTALS		58	2,326	40.1	56	3	13	7	2
	OPPONENTS		63	2,673	42.4	59	3	23	11	0

Kick return statistics
#	NAME	POS	RTNS	YDS	AVG	TD	LNG
2	Adoree' Jackson	CB	25	578	23.1	0	40
22	Justin Davis	TB	6	146	24.3	0	36
9	JuJu Smith-Schuster	WR	4	51	12.8	0	27
40	Jabari Ruffin	LB	2	21	10.5	0	18
38	Jahleel Pinner	FB	1	4	4.0	0	4
54	Reuben Peters	LB	1	3	3.0	0	3
16	Dominic Davis	TB-WR	1	2	2.0	0	2
31	Soma Vainuku	FB	1	−8	−8.0	0	−8
	TOTALS		41	797	19.4	0	40
	OPPONENTS		63	1,286	20.4	0	56

Punt return statistics
#	NAME	POS	RTNS	YDS	AVG	TD	LONG
2	Adoree' Jackson	CB	23	250	10.9	2	45
29	Chris Tober	WR	2	3	1.5	0	3
7	Steven Mitchell Jr.	WR	1	1	1.0	0	1
	TOTALS		26	254	9.8	2	45
	OPPONENTS		15	207	13.8	1	45

== Awards ==
=== College Sports Madness All-American Team ===
- Second team

Su'a Cravens – LB – Junior

- Third Team

Zach Banner – OT – (redshirt) Junior

=== USA Today Sports Freshman All-America Team ===
- First team

Cameron Smith – LB – Freshman
Iman Marshall- CB – Freshman

=== Pac-12 All-Conference Team ===
- First team

JuJu Smith-Schuster – WR – Sophomore
Zach Banner – OT – (redshirt) Junior
Antwaun Woods – DT – (redshirt) Senior
Su'a Cravens – LB – Junior
Adoree' Jackson – CB – Sophomore

- Second team

Chad Wheeler – OT – (redshirt) Junior
Delvon Simmons – DE – (redshirt) Senior
Soma Vainuku – FB – (redshirt) Senior
Adoree' Jackson – RS – Sophomore

- Honorable mention

Cody Kessler – QB – (redshirt) Senior
Justin Davis – TB – Junior
Ronald Jones II – TB – Freshman
Damien Mama – OG – Sophomore
Cameron Smith – LB – Freshman

=== Pac-12 All-Academic Team ===
- First team

Robby Kolanz – WR – (redshirt) Junior
Connor Spears – TE – (redshirt) Sophomore

- Honorable mention

Alex Wood – K – (redshirt) Junior

=== Pac-12 Freshman ===
- Defensive Player of the Year

Cameron Smith – LB – Freshman

== Notes ==
- March 23, 2015 – Former Oklahoma tight end Tyler McNamara Transferring to USC.
- May 1, 2015 – Former SC Linebacker Charles Burks transferring to Azusa Pacific
- June 24, 2015 – Former Florida Tight end Daniel Imatorbhebhe Transferring to USC.
- July 16, 2015 – Georgia Tech confirms addition of USC transfer Lamont Simmons.
- August 4, 2015 – Rahshead Johnson, former 4-star at USC, transfers to San Jose State.
- August 16, 2015 – Freshman Quarterback Ricky Town has decided to transfer.
- August 21, 2015 – Arkansas announces they have landed ex-USC QB Ricky Town.
- October 12, 2015 – Steve Sarkisian Fired as USC Football Coach.
- October 12, 2015 – Daelin Hayes De-Commits from USC Football.
- October 13, 2015 – Mique Juarez De-Commits from USC Football.
- October 30, 2015 – Athletic Director Pat Haden resigns from the College Football Playoff Selection Committee
- November 30, 2015 – Clay Helton Hired As USC Football Head Coach.
- December 6, 2015 – USC has confirmed the firing of Justin Wilcox, Keith Heyward, Bob Connelly and Chris Wilson.
- December 13, 2015 – Zach Banner to Return for Senior Season at USC.
- December 16, 2015 – Su'a Cravens Declares for 2016 NFL Draft.
- December 18, 2015 – Tee Martin Promoted To Offensive Coordinator.
- December 22, 2015 – Cody Kessler, Soma Vainuku To Play In Senior Bowl.
- December 22, 2015 – Antwaun Woods, Greg Townsend Jr. To Play In 2016 NFLPA Collegiate Bowl.
