= Tyler Ebell =

American football player (born 1983)

No. 27
- Position: Running back

Personal information
- Born: June 4, 1983 (age 43); Ventura, California, U.S.
- Listed height: 5 ft 9 in (1.75 m)
- Listed weight: 210 lb (95 kg)

Career information
- College: UCLA; UTEP

Career history
- 2007: Edmonton Eskimos
- 2008: Toronto Argonauts
- 2009: BC Lions
- 2009: Hamilton Tiger-Cats

Awards and highlights
- Second-team All-Pac-10 (2002); Glenn Davis Award (2000)
- Stats at CFL.ca

Tyler Jay Ebell (born June 4, 1983) is an American former professional football player who was a running back in the Canadian Football League (CFL). He played college football for the UCLA Bruins and UTEP Miners.

== Ventura High ==
Ebell was a star player at Ventura High School, where he earned three varsity letters as a running back for coach Phil McCune.

- Named National High School Athlete of the Year by the National High School Coaches Association
- Winner of the high school Heisman Trophy
- Member of PrepStar Dream Team (No. 6 running back)
- Parade All-American
- PrepStar All-American (No. 1 running back in West)
- USA Today California Player of the Year
- Winner of Glenn Davis Award as the L.A. Times' Southern California Player of the Year
- Selected as the L.A. Times' Ventura County Player of the Year and first-team All-Ventura County
- Rated the nation's No. 24 running back by Rivals.com
- Ranked No. 25 among the nation's backs by FoxStudentSports.com
- Tom Lemming All-West (No. 35 prospect)
- PrepStar Super 30 All-Western Region offensive MVP (No. 9 prospect)
- SuperPrep All-Far West/California (No. 59 prospect)
- Member of Long Beach Press-Telegram's Best in the West second team
- Led Ventura to 13-1 record
- CIF-SS Division IV championship
- Student Sports Senior All-American
- Cal-Hi Sports California State Player of the Year
- First-team All-State (Cal-Hi Sports)
- Las Vegas Sun Super 11 second team
- All-CIF Southern Section first team
- CIF-SS Division IV Offensive Player of the Year
- Selected to play in CaliFlorida All-Star game and the California/Texas Shrine game
- Set new national records as a senior in 2000 with 4,495 rushing yards and 64 rushing touchdowns
- Set California career records with 7,385 rushing yards and 111 rushing touchdowns on 895 attempts (8.3 average)
- Rushed for 276 yards (9.6 average) and three scores in CIF title game against Arroyo Grande
- Rushed for at least 300 yards in 10 games in 2000, including 393 yards and six touchdowns in the first meeting with Arroyo Grande, 379 and five touchdowns versus Oxnard, 375 yards and five scores against Moorpark, 365 yards and four touchdowns versus Santa Barbara, and 361 yards and six scores against San Marcos
- Averaged double figures in yards per carry in eight of his 14 games
- Scored at least five touchdowns seven times
- Set a school record with six touchdowns in a game (five times)
- Set state record for most points in a season (388)
- As a junior in 1999, he rushed for 1,633 yards and 31 touchdowns
- In his sophomore season, he ran for 1,291 yards and 17 touchdowns
- Also averaged 15 points per game in basketball while earning first-team All-League honors for coach Dan Larson
- Ran track for coach Ralph Martinez

== College ==
Ebell was one of the success stories of the 2002 UCLA football season, and established himself as a promising performer. He came off the bench in the fifth game of the season, against Oregon State, after carrying just 13 times in prior games, to participate in one of the most revered games in UCLA history. He went on to approach the 1,000 yard rushing mark for the season and earn second-team All-Pac-10 acclaim. Ebell enjoyed a spring practice, showing that he was becoming an experienced player. His speed separated him from most backs and enabled him to be a threat to score anytime he touched the football. He also worked hard to become a pass protector.

=== 2002 ===
Ebell earned second-team freshman All-America honors from The Sporting News in 2002 and was selected second-team all-conference by vote of the league coaches. He led the Bruins in rushing with 994 yards and was the leading scorer with 10 touchdowns (60 points). He was ranked fourth in the Pac-10 in rushing (76.5), fifth in punt returns (11.4), ninth in all-purpose yards (106.3) and 13th in total offense, despite not earning much playing time until the season's fifth game. In eight Pac-10 games, he carried 197 times for 876 yards and eight touchdowns (108.3 yards per game average). Ebell ended the season just six yards shy of becoming only the third freshman in Pac-10 history to rush for 1,000 yards. His 994 yards ranked 17th on the school single-season list, while his 1,382 all-purpose yards ranks No. 10 on the UCLA list. Ebell ranked seventh nationally among freshman rushers. He became the first freshman (true or redshirt) in school history to rush for at least 100 yards in six games (the old record was two, held by several players), all consecutive. He also set a new school freshman rushing record, breaking Eric Ball's old mark of 703 yards, set in 1985. Ebell was the first freshman since DeShaun Foster in 1998 to lead the team in rushing. His streak of six straight 100 yards games was the second-longest one-season streak in school history (Gaston Green did it seven times in 1986).

On October, 5 at Oregon State, Ebell came off the bench in the second quarter following an injury to Manuel White to enjoy one of the greatest days in UCLA history. He rushed for 203 yards and one touchdown on 29 carries. His 203 yards ranked 14th on UCLA's single-season game list (second on UCLA's single-game freshman list). He ran for 45 yards on 12 attempts in the second quarter, 34 yards on eight carries in the third quarter and 124 yards on nine carries in the fourth quarter. His 73-yard fourth quarter rush to the one-yard line was the second longest ever by a Bruin freshman (83 yards by Derek Ayers vs. BYU in 1993). Ebell made the first start of his career against Oregon and ran for 119 yards (89 on 15 attempts in the second half) on 26 attempts. He also returned five punts for 64 yards. At Cal, he started and broke the 100-yard barrier for the third straight week, finishing with 102 yards on 28 attempts. He scored UCLA's only touchdown on an 11-yard run. Against Stanford, he rushed for 160 yards (fourth straight game over 100 yards) and the go-ahead touchdown on 39 carries, three shy of the school record for carries. In the second half, he carried 25 times for 118 yards. He carried the ball on 25 of UCLA's 33 offensive snaps (excluding two kneel downs at the end of the contest) in the second half of the game. In the fourth quarter, he carried on the final 12 snaps. At Washington, Ebell reached the 100-yard plateau for the fifth straight game, finishing with 102 yards and three one-yard touchdowns on 31 attempts. He had three double-figure runs, including rushes of 23 and 22 yards.

At Arizona, he became only the second UCLA player in history to rush for over 100 yards in six consecutive games in the same season. Ebell finished with 124 yards and two touchdowns on 22 carries. He had four runs of at least 19 yards in the game. Against USC, he led the Bruins with 56 yards on 12 attempts. He had runs of 11 and 13 yards on UCLA's first possession of the second half, but carried just twice more with the Bruins facing a 35-7 deficit, He also made two receptions for 29 yards. Ebell was limited to 10 yards on nine carries in the Washington State game and caught four passes for two yards. He also returned two kickoffs for 43 yards. In the bowl game win over New Mexico, he ran for 70 yards on 25 carries and returned a punt for seven yards. He was named winner of the John Boncheff, Jr. Memorial Award for team Rookie of the Year on Offense.

=== 2003 ===
Ebell started eight games and rushed for 501 yards on 116 carries (4.3 average) with two touchdowns. He also made 10 receptions for 68 yards while splitting carries with Maurice Jones-Drew and Manuel White Jr.

=== 2004 ===
He transferred to the University of Texas at El Paso and sat out the season due to the NCAA transfer rules.

=== 2005 ===
Ebell started the first seven games and missed the rest of the season due to injury. He posted solid numbers despite the injury with 118 carries for 536 yards and 5 touchdowns, and 20 receptions for 250 yards. He earned 3rd team All-Conference, despite playing only three conference games.

== Professional career ==
Ebell signed with the Edmonton Eskimos on May 28, 2007. He led the 2007 team in combined rushing and receiving yards with 1318, and he was named team rookie of the year.

On February 15, 2008, Ebell was traded, along with wide receiver T. J. Acree, to the Toronto Argonauts, for cornerback Jordan Younger. He missed the entire 2008 season after rupturing his achilles tendon during training camp.

During the 2009 CFL season, Ebell started out with the Argonauts during pre-season but was surprisingly released at the end of training camp. On July 6, 2009, the BC Lions signed Ebell to help fill the role missed by the injury to Ian Smart and he was named the runner-up to special teams player of week for Week 3. Nonetheless, as Smart recovered, Ebell was first placed on the practice roster on July 22, 2009, and ultimately released on July 30. On October 27, 2009, Ebell was signed by the Hamilton Tiger-Cats and added onto their practice roster. On November 15 he was added to the active roster for the East Semi-Final Playoff game versus the BC Lions.
