= Tre Madden =

American football player (born 1993)

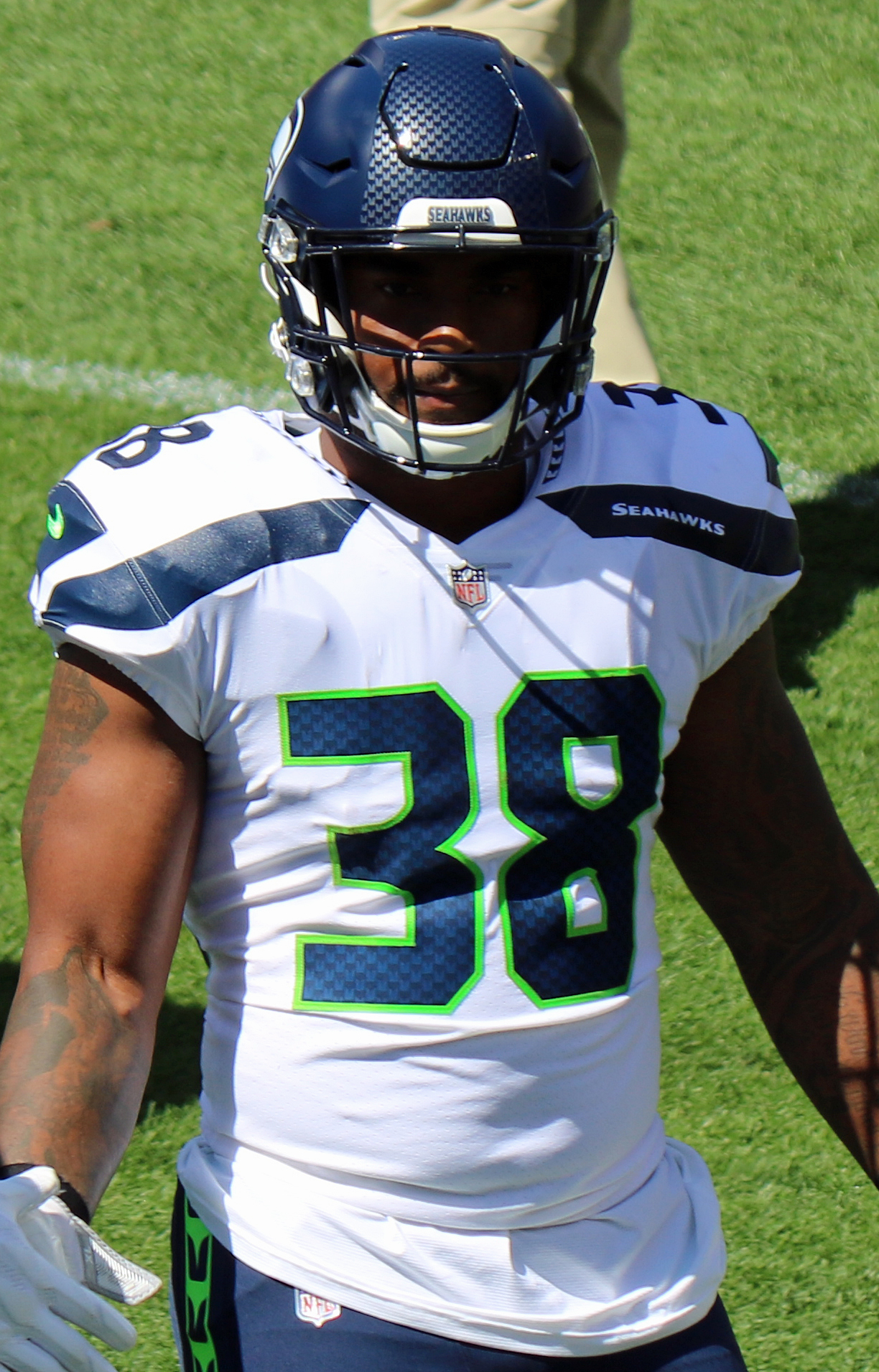
- Madden in 2018

No. 38
- Position: Fullback

Personal information
- Born: August 16, 1993 (age 33); Aliso Viejo, California, U.S.
- Listed height: 6 ft 0 in (1.83 m)
- Listed weight: 235 lb (107 kg)

Career information
- High school: Mission Viejo (Mission Viejo, California)
- College: USC
- NFL draft: 2016: undrafted

Career history
- Seattle Seahawks (2016–2018)

Career NFL statistics
- Rushing attempts: 3
- Rushing yards: 3
- Receptions: 4
- Receiving yards: 100
- Stats at Pro Football Reference

Curtis "Tre" Madden III (born August 16, 1993) is an American former professional football player who was a fullback in the National Football League (NFL). He played college football for the USC Trojans.

== Early life ==
Madden, born Curtis Ray Madden III, was born in Texas before moving to Mission Viejo, California later in his life. He attended Mission Viejo High School where he played football as an inside linebacker and was used as a wildcat quarterback. Madden graduated from Mission Viejo in 2011.

== College career ==
Madden verbally committed to USC on September 23, 2010. In 2011, Madden's freshman year, he played in 12 games while being used as a backup strongside linebacker. Madden was switched to running back during the spring of the 2012 season but suffered a torn left knee ligament which forced him to redshirted for the season. In 2013 Madden started the season strong with three consecutive 100-yard rushing performances but was troubled with hamstring injuries later in the season. Again Madden sat out a season in 2014 due to a turf toe injury which he suffered in fall camp. In 2015 Madden appeared in nine games but again struggled with knee trouble and underwent arthroscopic knee surgery after the end of the regular season forcing him to miss the team's bowl game.

Madden finished his collegiate career appearing in 32 games with 15 tackles, 1,489 yards from scrimmage, and 13 total touchdowns.

== Professional career ==
Pre-draft measurables
Height	Weight	Arm length	Hand span	40-yard dash	20-yard shuttle	Three-cone drill	Vertical jump	Broad jump	Bench press
6 ft 0 in (1.83 m)	223 lb (101 kg)	29 3/4	9 3/8	4.60 s	4.27 s	7.09 s	33 1/2	10 ft 0 in (3.05 m)	24 reps
All values from NFL Combine and USC Pro Day

On April 30, 2016, after going undrafted in the 2016 NFL draft, Madden signed as an undrafted free agent with the Seattle Seahawks. On August 6, 2016, Madden was waived/injured by the Seahawks' and was placed on injured reserve the following day after clearing waivers.

In Week 7 of the 2017 season, in a game against the New York Giants, he made his first career NFL reception, a catch for −1 yard. The next week, against the Houston Texans, he recorded a 66-yard reception. He was placed on injured reserve on November 7, 2017, with a calf injury.

After spending the 2019 NFL season out of football, Madden had a tryout with the Detroit Lions on August 16, 2020.

== Personal life ==
Madden is the son of Curtis Madden Sr. who played college football as a fullback and defensive end at Kansas State from 1988 to 1991. His grandfather, Lawrence McCutcheon, was an All-Pro running back in the NFL from 1972 to 1981. His uncle, Daylon McCutcheon, was a cornerback in the NFL from 1999 to 2006 and is currently an assistant defensive back coach for the New York Jets.

Madden received his bachelor's degree in communication at USC in the spring of 2015.
