= Antwaun Woods =

American football player (born 1993)

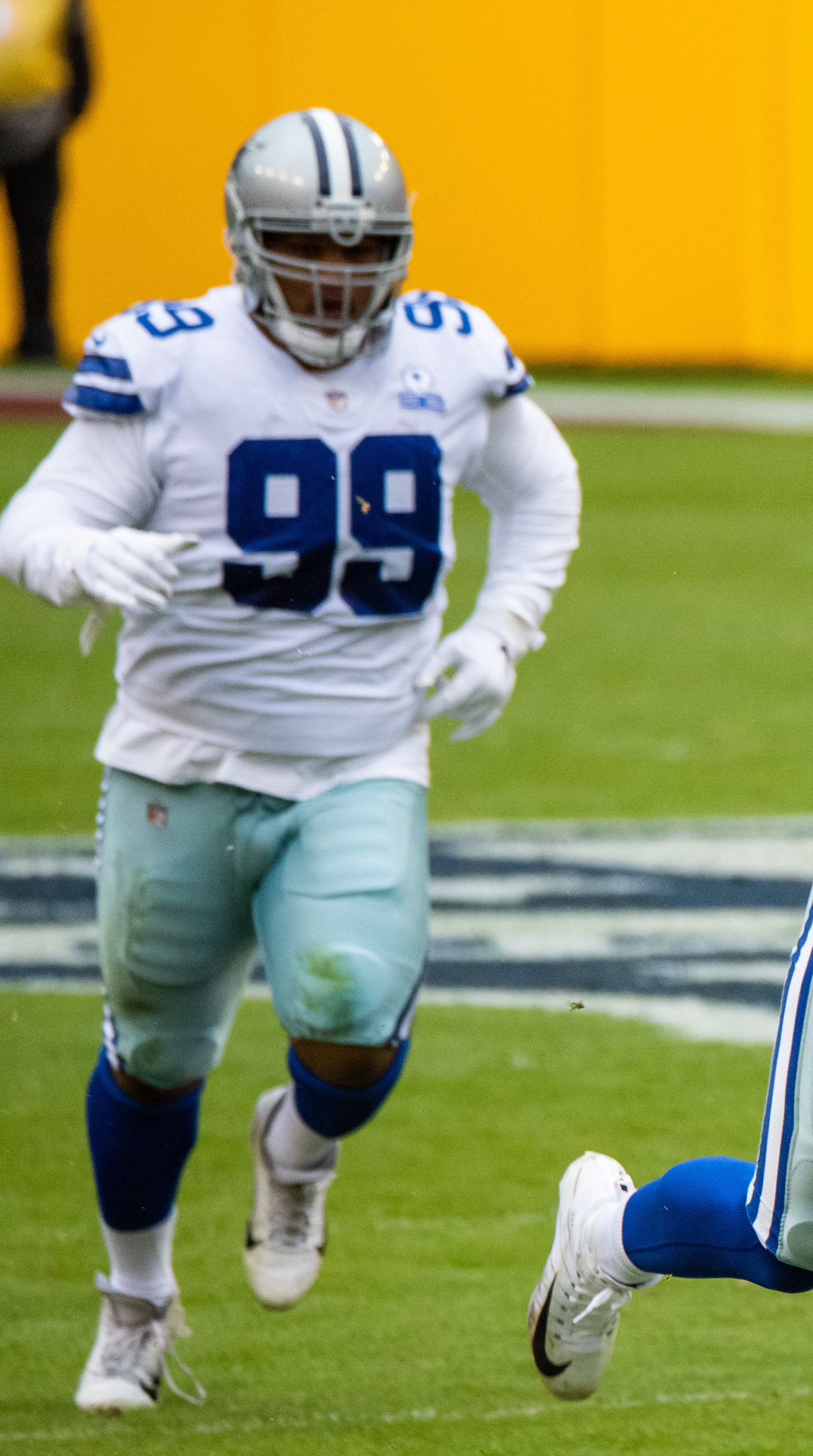
- Woods with the Dallas Cowboys in 2020

No. 75, 99, 96, 92
- Position: Nose tackle

Personal information
- Born: January 3, 1993 (age 33); Los Angeles, California, U.S.
- Listed height: 6 ft 1 in (1.85 m)
- Listed weight: 307 lb (139 kg)

Career information
- High school: William Howard Taft (Woodland Hills, California)
- College: USC
- NFL draft: 2016: undrafted

Career history
- Tennessee Titans (2016–2017); Dallas Cowboys (2018–2020); Indianapolis Colts (2021); Arizona Cardinals (2022)

Awards and highlights
- First-team All-Pac-12 (2015)

Career NFL statistics
- Total tackles: 90
- Sacks: 2.5
- Fumble recoveries: 3
- Pass deflections: 1
- Stats at Pro Football Reference

Antwaun Woods (born January 3, 1993) is an American former professional football player who was a nose tackle in the National Football League (NFL). He played college football for the USC Trojans. He has played in the National Football League (NFL) for the Tennessee Titans, Dallas Cowboys, Indianapolis Colts, and Arizona Cardinals.

== Early life ==
Woods was a starter for all four years playing for William Howard Taft. His junior year he collected 38 tackles and had 4 sacks, and 31 tackles and 2 sacks as a senior. He was named Super Prep All-American, Under Armour All-American, ESPNU 150. He received a scholarship to USC.

== College career ==
Woods redshirted his first year at USC. He started the first four games of his freshman season as a nose tackle and used as a backup for the rest of the season, and recorded 16 tackles, 3 sacks and 4.5 tackles for loss. He started for half of his sophomore season and recorded 20 tackles, 1 sack and 2 tackles for a loss and a pass deflection. His junior year he was used mostly as a nose tackle, appearing in twelve games while starting in ten of them. He recorded 37 tackles with 1 sack and 1 tackle for loss. His season ended after tearing his pectoral just before the Holiday Bowl.

In his senior year, he recorded 38 tackles, 3 sacks, with 6 tackles for a loss which earned him Defensive Lineman of the Year. Overall, Woods recorded 111 tackles, 8 sacks, and 13.5 tackles for loss throughout his college career. Some of Woods' artwork was displayed at the 2013 "Artletics" on-campus exhibit that featured the works of USC student-athletes. In 2015, he received a bachelor's degree in sociology.

=== Statistics ===
| Season | Team | GP | Defense | | | | |
| Season | Team | GP | Cmb | TfL | Sck | Int | PD |
|---|---|---|---|---|---|---|---|
| 2012 | USC | 12 | 16 | 4.5 | 3.0 | 0 | 0 |
| 2013 | USC | 11 | 20 | 2.0 | 1.0 | 0 | 1 |
| 2014 | USC | 12 | 37 | 1.0 | 1.0 | 0 | 1 |
| 2015 | USC | 13 | 38 | 6.0 | 3.0 | 0 | 0 |
| Career | | 46 | 111 | 13.5 | 8.0 | 0 | 2 |

== Professional career ==
Pre-draft measurables
| Height | Weight | Arm length | Hand span | 40-yard dash | 10-yard split | 20-yard split | Vertical jump | Broad jump |
|---|---|---|---|---|---|---|---|---|
| 6 ft 0 1/8 in (1.83 m) | 318 lb (144 kg) | 31 in (0.79 m) | 9 5/8 in (0.24 m) | 5.00 s | 1.75 s | 2.89 s | 27.5 in (0.70 m) | 8 ft 8 in (2.64 m) |
All values from NFL Combine/Pro Day

=== Tennessee Titans ===
Woods was signed as an undrafted free agent by the Tennessee Titans after the 2016 NFL draft on May 1, 2016. He was released on September 3, 2016, and was signed to the Titans' practice squad the next day. He was promoted to the active roster on December 28, 2016. He played in the season finale against the Houston Texans and had 2 tackles (one for loss).

On September 2, 2017, Woods was waived by the Titans and was signed to the practice squad the next day. He signed a reserve/future contract with the Titans on January 15, 2018.

On May 17, 2018, Woods was waived/injured by the Titans and was placed on injured reserve. He was released with an injury settlement on May 22, 2018.

=== Dallas Cowboys ===
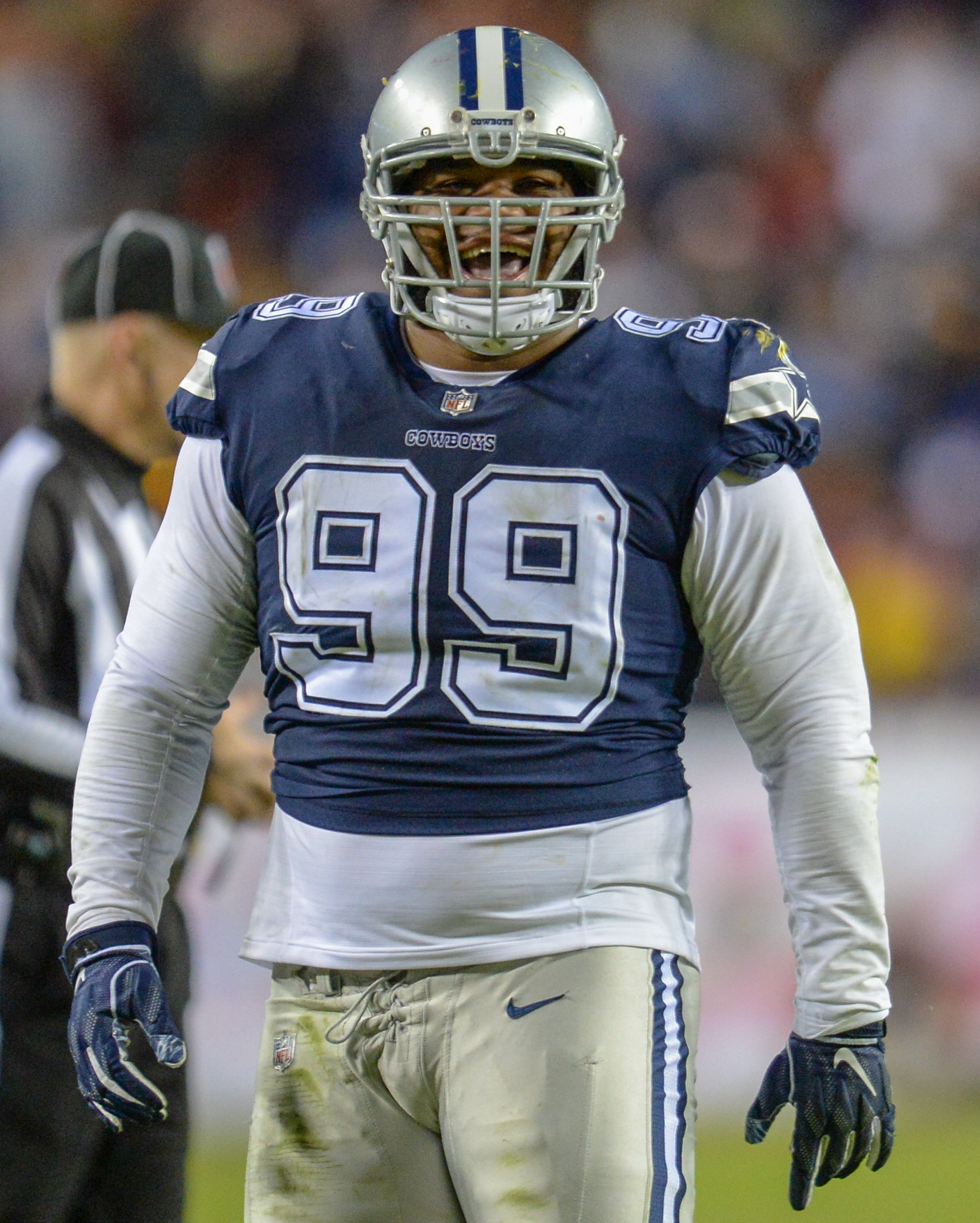
Woods with the Cowboys in 2018

On May 30, 2018, Woods signed a two-year, $1.05 million contract with the Dallas Cowboys. On August 31, 2018, he made the Cowboys 53-man roster as the starter at the 1-technique defensive tackle position. He missed the tenth game against the Atlanta Falcons with a concussion and was replaced with Caraun Reid. He started 15 games, posting 34 tackles (one for loss), 1.5 sacks, 10 quarterback pressures, one pass breakup and one fumble recovery. In the NFC Divisional playoff loss against the Los Angeles Rams, he had to play through a torn labrum injury that required offseason surgery.

In 2019, he started in 10 games at the 1-technique defensive tackle position. In the second game against the Washington Redskins, he suffered a left MCL sprain that forced him to miss the next 3 contests and was replaced with Christian Covington. In the eleventh game against the New England Patriots, he suffered an MCL sprain in the fourth quarter that forced him to miss the next 2 contests and was replaced with Covington. He didn't play in the season finale against the Washington Redskins. He registered 29 tackles (one for loss), 2 quarterback pressures and one fumble recovery.

Woods re-signed with the Cowboys on a one-year exclusive-rights free agent tender on July 28, 2020. He began the season as a reserve player behind free agent acquisition Dontari Poe. In Week 3, Woods recorded three tackles and sacked Russell Wilson once in the 31-38 loss In the eighth game against the Philadelphia Eagles, he was named the starter at the 1-technique defensive tackle position after the team released Poe. He injured his ankle in the fourteenth game against the San Francisco 49ers. On December 26, 2020, Woods was placed on injured reserve with an ankle injury. He appeared in 14 games with 7 starts, while collecting 33 tackles, one sack and 4 quarterback pressures.

On March 17, 2021, the Cowboys placed a restricted free agent tender on Woods. On April 22, he signed the one-year contract. On May 5, 2021, he was waived after the Cowboys used eight of their 11 selections in the 2021 NFL draft on defensive players.

=== Indianapolis Colts ===
On May 11, 2021, Woods signed with the Indianapolis Colts. He was released on September 6, 2021 and re-signed to the practice squad. He was promoted to the active roster on September 24, 2021. He was released on October 11, 2021 and re-signed to the practice squad. He was promoted back to the active roster on October 19. On December 18, he was placed on injured reserve. He appeared in 7 games and collected 5 tackles.

=== Arizona Cardinals ===
On July 29, 2022, Woods signed with the Arizona Cardinals. He was released on August 30, 2022 and signed to the practice squad the next day. He appeared in one game, making 2 tackles (one for loss). He was released on January 5, 2023.

== Personal life ==
On December 3, 2019, Woods was arrested and charged with possession of marijuana and tampering with evidence in Frisco, Texas.
