= Whitney Lewis =

American football player (born 1985)

No. 20
- Position: Wide receiver

Personal information
- Born: August 13, 1985 (age 41); Corpus Christi, Texas
- Listed height: 6 ft 1 in (1.85 m)
- Listed weight: 225 lb (102 kg)

Career information
- High school: St. Bonaventure (Ventura, California)
- College: Northern Iowa
- NFL draft: 2008: undrafted

Career history
- N/A

Awards and highlights
- Glenn Davis Award (2002); 2002 Parade All-American first team; 2002 Super Prep All-American, Prep Star All-American; 2002 Student Sports All-American first team; 2002 Tom Lemming All-American; 2002 CNNSI.com All-American first team; 2002 Glenn Davis Award; 2002 All-CIF Division IV Offensive MVP

Whitney Lewis (born August 13, 1985) is a former American college football player. Lewis started his college career at University of Southern California in 2003, but transferred to the University of Northern Iowa after his sophomore season. Lewis graduated from St. Bonaventure High School in 2003 and played in that year's U.S. Army All-American Bowl. He was given the Glenn Davis Award for the top prep football player in Southern California.

In 2002, he was the first player in California High School football history to rush for 1,000+ yards and receive for 1,000+ in the same season.
