= Lutheran High School of Orange County =

Orange Lutheran High School

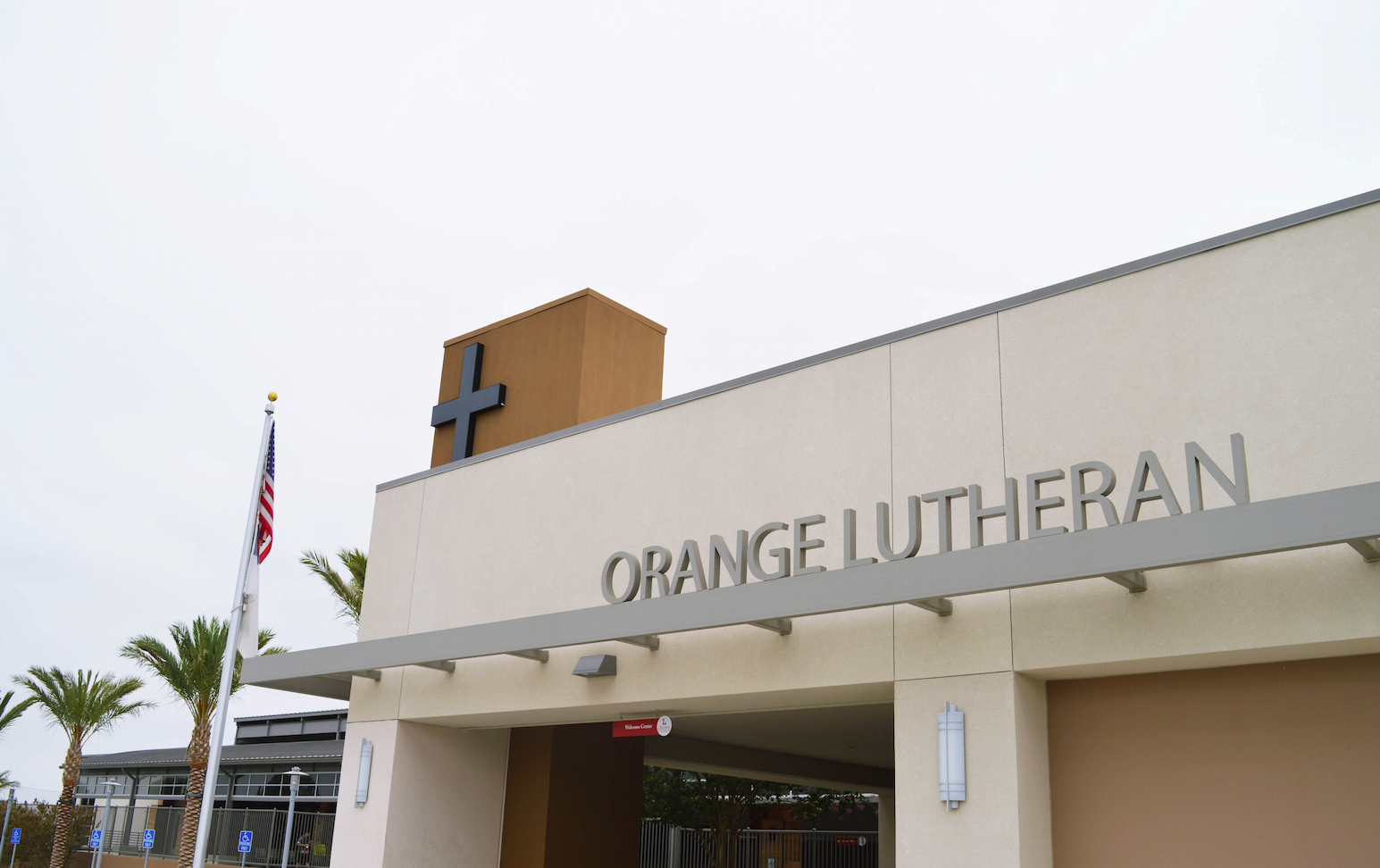

Location
- 2222 North Santiago Boulevard; Orange, California; United States; 33°49′30″N 117°49′41″W

Information
- Type: Private
- Motto: Strengthened by Christ. Prepared for Life.
- Religious affiliation: Lutheran Church – Missouri Synod
- Established: 1973
- Head of school: Dr. Jack Preus
- Faculty: 84.5 (on FTE basis)
- Grades: 9 to 12
- Enrollment: 1,534 (2025-26)
- Student to teacher ratio: 16.1
- Colors: Red, gold, and white
- Athletics conference: CIF Southern Section; Trinity League
- Mascot: Lancer
- Nickname: OLu (pronounced Oh-Loo)
- Team name: Lancers
- Website: lhsoc.org

Orange Lutheran High School (OLu) is a private Lutheran high school in Orange, California, in the Los Angeles Metropolitan Area, founded in 1973. The school offers on-campus, online, and blended schedules for its students. Orange Lutheran is accredited by the National Lutheran School Accreditation Organization and the Western Association of Schools and Colleges. The school is also known for its Missions Program, which travels internationally and domestically on a year-round basis.

== History ==
In the fall of 2003, the Alexandra Nechita Center for the Arts opened in the space once occupied by an old gym. The 740-seat performance hall is home to drama, dance, instrumental and vocal music productions, guest speakers and chapel services.

In 2014, the school completed a round of renovations as part of its "Beyond Expectations" program which added 40,000 sq. ft. of new buildings to the school’s footprint, including a new academic center, three new classrooms, and new collaborative meeting spaces for students, teachers and parents, in addition to the student union and a 12,900 sq. ft. covered lunch area.

In late 2004, Orange Lutheran partnered with the Apollo Group to offer online classes. In 2013, the school launched a new enrollment system and integrated tablets into its curriculum.

== Academics ==
The school operates under a two semester system and eight periods on a block schedule. Four are periods offered each day that are 75 minutes in length. All students attend Daily Gathering, which includes Praise & Worship, Chapel and school activities.

Orange Lutheran incorporates 19 Advanced Placement classes into its curriculum. The Orange Lutheran Online (OLO) program allows for students to complete coursework online on a full-time basis. "Blended" schedules allow students to work online and attend on-campus classes. The school also offers a STEM program.

=== Service ===
All students are required to complete a minimum of 20 hours of "Service to Society" community service for each year of attendance. Five of the 20 hours will involve participation in one Service Day event each year.

== Athletics ==
Orange Lutheran has 23 varsity athletic teams. Athletics are divided into three seasons throughout the year: fall, winter, and spring. The fall sports feature cross country, football, girls golf, surf, girls tennis, girls volleyball, and boys water polo. The winter sports feature boys basketball, girls basketball, ice hockey, boys soccer, girls soccer, girls water polo, and wrestling. The spring sports feature baseball, boys golf, boys lacrosse, girls lacrosse, softball, swim & dive, boys tennis, track & field, and boys volleyball. The school competes in the CIF Southern Section and the Trinity League.

State Championship
Sport			Year
Football	Division II	Lutheran def. Palo Alto 42-28	2006
Surf			
Ice Hockey			2015
Ice Hockey			2016

== Notable people ==
Alumni

- Stanley Berryhill, professional football player
- Gerrit Cole, professional baseball player
- Aaron Corp, professional football player
- Derek Curiel, college baseball player
- Hannes Daube, American water polo player named to the United States Olympic roster for the 2020 Summer Olympics, and a bronze medal winner in water polo at the 2024 Paris Olympics.
- Ryan Hilinski, quarterback for the Northwestern University Wildcats
- Jason Martin, professional baseball player
- Brandon Maurer, professional baseball player
- Garrett Mitchell, professional baseball player
- Amber Neben, Olympic cyclist
- Alexandra Nechita, painter
- Austin Pettis, professional football player
- Conner Sullivan, quarterback for the University of Southern California Trojans and Stuttgart Scorpions
- Dean Thompson, professional racing driver for Niece Motorsports
- Andrew Thurman, professional baseball player
- Cole Winn, professional baseball player
- Gabe York (born 1993), basketball player for the Zhejiang Golden Bulls

Faculty

- Mark Langston, former baseball coach
