= Su'a Cravens =

American football player (born 1995)

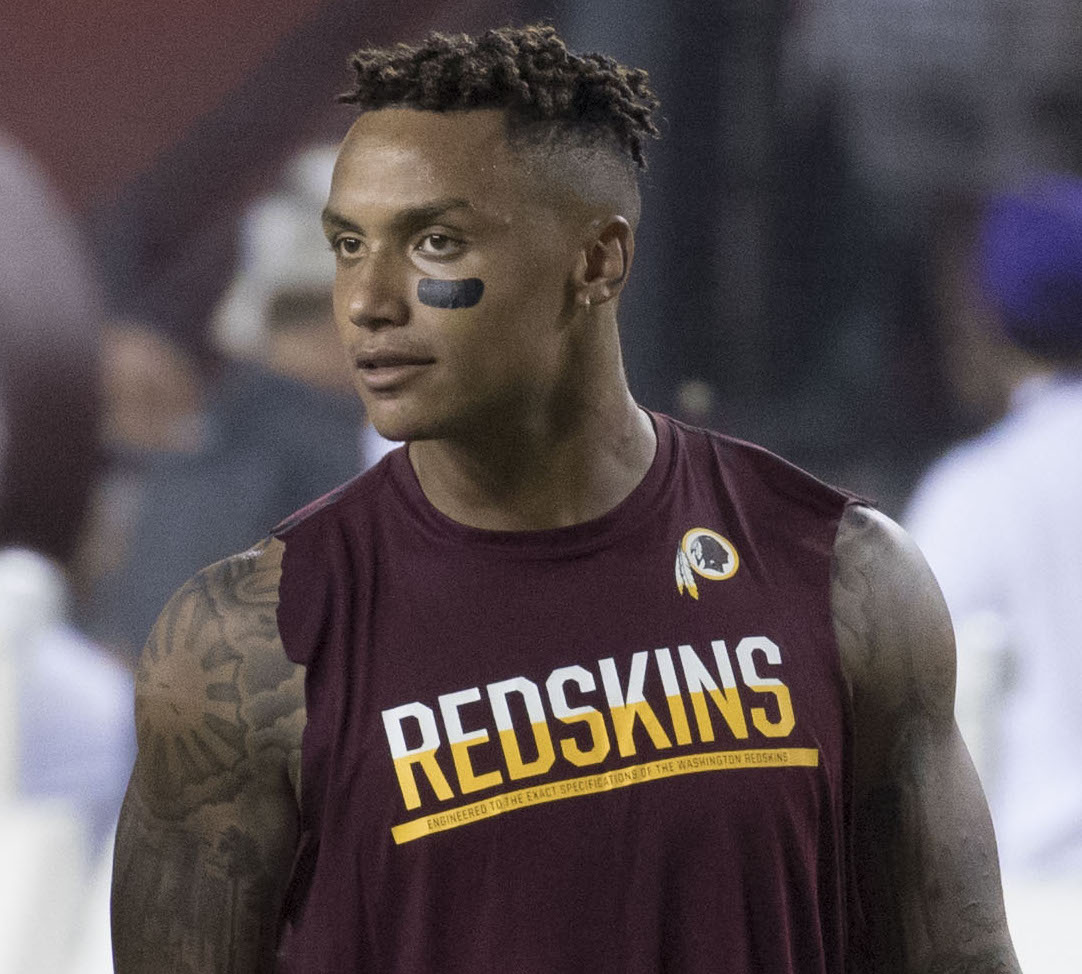
- Cravens with the Washington Redskins in 2016

No. 21, 36
- Position: Safety

Personal information
- Born: July 7, 1995 (age 31); Los Angeles, California, U.S.
- Listed height: 6 ft 1 in (1.85 m)
- Listed weight: 224 lb (102 kg)

Career information
- High school: Vista Murrieta (Murrieta, California)
- College: USC (2013–2015)
- NFL draft: 2016: 2nd round, 53rd overall pick

Career history
- Washington Redskins (2016–2017); Denver Broncos (2018)

Awards and highlights
- Second-team All-American (2015); 2× First-team All-Pac-12 (2014, 2015)

Career NFL statistics
- Total tackles: 52
- Sacks: 1
- Pass deflections: 5
- Interceptions: 1
- Stats at Pro Football Reference

Su'a Kristopher Cravens (born July 7, 1995) is an American former professional football player who was a safety in the National Football League (NFL). He played college football for the USC Trojans, and was selected by the Washington Redskins in the second round of the 2016 NFL draft.

Cravens played the linebacker position during his rookie year with the team, before moving full time to strong safety the following season. However, Cravens announced his decision to retire just before the season began, and was placed on the team's reserve list as a result. After undergoing treatment for post-concussion syndrome, Cravens later announced his intention to return to the Redskins, but was traded to the Denver Broncos during the 2018 offseason.

== Early life ==
Cravens attended Temecula Valley High School as a freshman in 2009. He then transferred to Vista Murrieta High School as a sophomore, where he had 90 tackles, eights sacks, five fumble recoveries and three forced fumbles. He earned Max Preps Sophomore All-American second team, Cal-Hi Sports All-State Sophomore first team, and All-Southwestern League first team honors.

In his junior year in 2011, Cravens played linebacker and defensive back on defense, as well as running back and wide receiver on offense. He was Max Preps All-American first team, ESPNHS.com All-American second team, Max Preps Junior All-American first team, ESPNHS.com Underclass All-American first team, along with other honors. For the year, he had 98 tackles, 11 sacks, three interceptions, six deflections, one fumble recovery and four forced fumbles on defense and also caught 20 passes for 239 yards (17.0 avg.) with four touchdowns and ran for 673 yards on 75 carries (9.0 avg.) with 15 touchdowns on offense, as Vista Murrieta went 14–0 and captured the CIF Inland Division title with a 35–28 win over perennial powerhouse Corona Centennial.

His 2012 senior season honors included USA Today All-USA Defensive Player of the Year, Parade All-American, Prep Star All-American Dream Team, and Max Preps All-American first team. Cravens compiled 97 tackles, eight sacks, three interceptions, four deflections, two fumble recoveries, four forced fumbles and three blocked punts on defense in 2012, and also caught 21 passes for 342 yards (16.3 avg.) and ran for 200 yards on 17 carries (11.8 avg.) with 14 total touchdowns on offense, helping lead Vista Murrieta to a 13–1 record. Their only loss came in the CIF Inland Division final against Corona Centennial.

Cravens also participated in track & field at Vista Murrieta, where he competed in jumps and posted a personal-best leap of 1.93 meters (six feet, four inches) in the high jump.

Regarded as a five-star recruit by Rivals.com, Cravens was listed as the No. 1 safety prospect in his class and the No. 12 prospect overall in the country. He played in the 2013 U.S. Army All-American Bowl. Cravens chose the Trojans over offers from nearly every BCS program in the nation, including Michigan, Nebraska and Ohio State. Cravens became the Trojans’ eighth commitment for the 2013 class and the fifth five-star rated recruit in a class featuring quarterback Max Browne, defensive lineman Kenny Bigelow and running backs Ty Isaac and Justin Davis. He enrolled at USC in the spring of 2013 after graduating a semester early from high school.

== College career ==
=== Freshman year ===
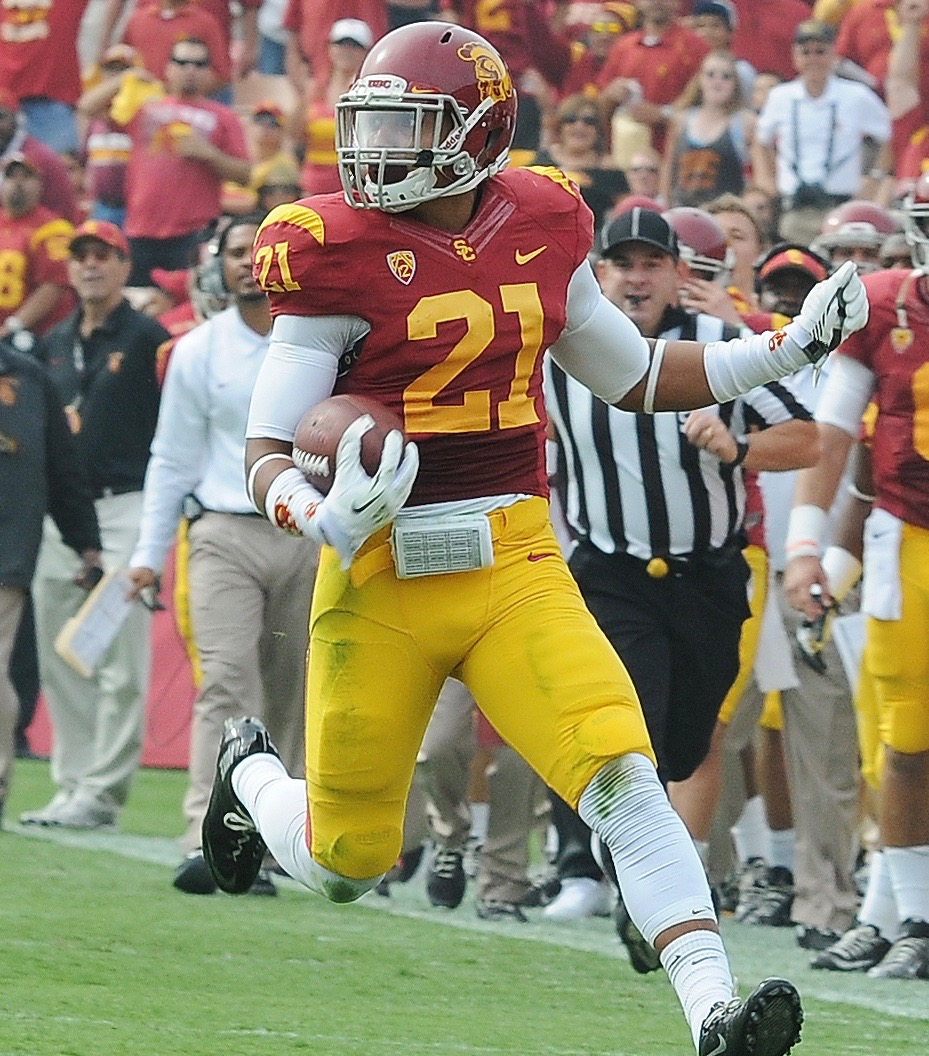
Cravens in 2013

Cravens started at strong safety as a first-year freshman and made quite an impact. Overall in 2013, while appearing in and starting 13 games (he suffered a groin injury against Utah and missed the Oregon State game), he had 52 tackles, including 1.5 for losses of four yards, plus four interceptions for 54 yards (13.5 avg), one deflection, one forced fumble and one fumble recovery. He also returned a kickoffs for 33 yards and a punt for one yard. He made the 2013 Sporting News Freshman All-American first team, Athlon Freshman All-American first team, Phil Steele Freshman All-American first team, CollegeFootballNews.com Freshman All-American first team and 247Sports.com True Freshman All-American second team. He was also an All-Pac-12 Conference honorable mention. He missed the last half of spring practice after having surgery for a torn cartilage in his knee.

=== Sophomore year ===
Cravens returned as a starter for his sophomore year in 2014. He was asked to play a hybrid strong safety/strongside outside linebacker spot. Starting all 13 games for the second consecutive season, he compiled 68 tackles, including a team-best 17 for losses (more than any defensive back in the nation), five sacks, nine deflections and a team-best three interceptions (he returned one of them 31 yards for a touchdown). His 17 tackles for loss in 2014 were the most by a non-defensive lineman at USC since linebacker Markus Steele had 17 in 2000. For his season efforts, he was named to the All-American third team by the Associated Press (AP) and Athlon, fourth team All-American by Phil Steele and was an SI.com All-American honorable mention, as well as CollegeFootballNews.com Sophomore All-American first team. He made the 2014 All-Pac-12 first team, as well as the Athlon All-Pac-12 first team, Phil Steele All-Pac-12 first team and CollegeSportsMadness.com All-Pac-12 first team. He won USC's Defensive Perimeter Player of the Year Award. Against Oregon State in Week 4, he returned an interception 31 yards for a touchdown to open the scoring against the Beavers and also had a team-best six tackles, including two for losses (with his first career sack) to earn Chuck Bednarik National Defensive Player of the Week honors.

=== Junior year ===
Cravens returned for his third year as a starter, again playing strongside outside linebacker (a hybrid safety-linebacker role) as a junior in 2015. Cravens was as a semifinalist for the Bednarik and Butkus awards after starting all 14 games as a 20-year-old team captain. He posted 86 tackles (46 solo), eight passes defensed, five sacks, two interceptions and two forced fumbles his junior season. After completing his junior season at the University of Southern California in 2015, he opted to forgo his final year of eligibility and enter the 2016 NFL draft. Cravens started 40 games for the Trojans and recorded 206 tackles (133 solo, 33.5 for a loss), 25 passes defensed, 10 sacks, nine interceptions (one returned for a touchdown) and three forced fumbles during his collegiate career. He earned first-team All-Pac-12 Conference honors at two different positions (defensive back - 2014, linebacker - 2015).

=== Statistics ===
| Regular season statistics | | | | Tackles | | | | | Interceptions | | | | | | Fumbles | | |
| Season | Team | GP | GS | Comb | Total | Ast | Sck | Tfl | PDef | Int | Yds | Avg | Lng | TDs | FF | FR | FR YDS |
|---|---|---|---|---|---|---|---|---|---|---|---|---|---|---|---|---|---|
| 2013 | USC | 13 | 13 | 53 | 39 | 14 | 0.0 | 2.5 | 1 | 4 | 54 | 13.5 | 54 | 0 | 2 | 1 | 14 |
| 2014 | USC | 13 | 13 | 68 | 49 | 19 | 5.0 | 17.0 | 9 | 3 | 47 | 15.7 | 31 | 1 | 0 | 0 | 0 |
| 2015 | USC | 14 | 14 | 86 | 46 | 40 | 5.5 | 15.0 | 6 | 2 | 32 | 16.0 | 32 | 0 | 2 | 0 | 0 |
| Totals | | 40 | 40 | 207 | 134 | 73 | 10.5 | 34.5 | 16 | 9 | 133 | 14.8 | 54 | 1 | 4 | 1 | 14 |

== Professional career ==
=== Pre-draft ===
Upon entering the draft, Cravens was projected in the NFL as a hybrid linebacker-safety, being compared to the Arizona Cardinals' Deone Bucannon.

Pre-draft measurables
| Height | Weight | Arm length | Hand span | 40-yard dash | 10-yard split | 20-yard split | 20-yard shuttle | Three-cone drill | Vertical jump | Broad jump | Bench press |
|---|---|---|---|---|---|---|---|---|---|---|---|
| 6 ft 0 3/4 in (1.85 m) | 226 lb (103 kg) | 32 1/8 in (0.82 m) | 9 1/2 in (0.24 m) | 4.69 s | 1.58 s | 2.68 s | 4.41 s | 6.92 s | 30 1/2 in (0.77 m) | 9 ft 6 in (2.90 m) | 16 reps |
All values from NFL Combine/USC's Pro Day

=== Washington Redskins ===
External videos
- NFL: Redskins Pick Su'a Cravens At Pick No. 53

The Washington Redskins selected Cravens in the second round (53rd overall) in the 2016 NFL Draft. Shortly after being drafted, the Redskins listed him as a safety on their roster. It was also announced that he would wear the No. 36 as his jersey number due to him being a fan of the former Redskins safety, Sean Taylor, who wore the same number as a rookie. On May 9, 2016, Cravens signed a four-year, US$4.43 million contract with the team. During offseason practices and training camp, Cravens played a majority of snaps from the inside linebacker position. Cravens appeared in 11 games, with three starts, in 2016, posting 33 tackles (23 solo), one sack, one interception, five passes defensed and one special-teams stop. He started two games at safety and one at linebacker. Cravens missed the final three games of the season with an injury. In a game against the New York Giants in September 2016, Cravens made a game-clinching interception of Eli Manning to help the Redskins win their first game of the season.

Cravens was projected to be the team's starting strong safety for the 2017 season. A week before the season opener against the Philadelphia Eagles, Cravens informed the team of his decision to retire. The announcement led to Redskins team president Bruce Allen convincing him to postpone it, and placed him on the team's exempt list, which was done in an effort to give him additional time to fix any personal issues that may have led to the decision. Two weeks later, the team placed him on the reserve/left squad list, foregoing any chance of him playing for the team in 2017. That December, Cravens was medically cleared to return after undergoing treatment and rehabilitation from post-concussion syndrome. Two months later, he was reinstated by the league.

=== Denver Broncos ===
On March 28, 2018, Cravens was traded to the Denver Broncos for a fifth round pick, along with a swap of fourth and fifth round draft picks in the 2018 NFL draft. He was placed on injured reserve on September 2, due to issues with his knee, but was activated back to the active roster on November 2. On August 30, 2019, Cravens was released as part of the final roster cuts.

== Personal life ==
Cravens is the son of Kevin and Yolanda Cravens. His older sister, Malia, was on the women's basketball team at Hawaii in 2012 before transferring to USC, where she was briefly on the 2013 Women of Troy basketball team as a guard before joining the track team as a high jumper. His older brother, Siaki, was a defensive lineman at Hawaii who previously played at Utah. His grandfather, Jack Cravens, played basketball and baseball at Brigham Young from 1957 to 1959. His cousins, Jordan and Brynn Cameron, played football (2008–2010) and women's basketball (2005–2009), respectively, at USC; Jordan also played men's basketball at USC in 2008 and BYU in 2007 and played as a tight end for the NFL's Cleveland Browns and Miami Dolphins. Another cousin, Colby Cameron, was a quarterback at Louisiana Tech (2009–2012) before signing with the NFL's Carolina Panthers.

With family roots from Samoa, Cravens is a distant cousin of former Notre Dame Fighting Irish linebacker Manti Te'o. His mother is second cousins with former Arizona State and NFL safety David Fulcher. His uncle is married to Kyle Whittingham's sister.
