= Conner Sullivan =

American football player (born 1992)

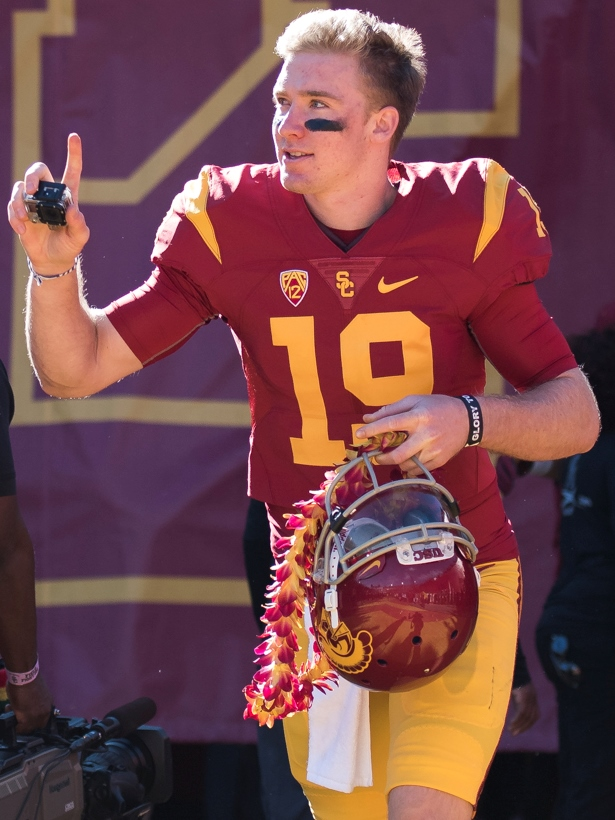
- Sullivan on Senior Day 2015

Profile
- Position: Quarterback

Personal information
- Born: June 17, 1992 (age 34); Irvine, California, U.S.
- Listed height: 6 ft 2 in (1.88 m)
- Listed weight: 200 lb (91 kg)

Career information
- High school: Orange Lutheran (CA)
- College: USC
- NFL draft: 2017: undrafted

Career history
- Stuttgart Scorpions (2017)

Conner Joseph Sullivan (born June 17, 1992) is an American former football quarterback where he played professionally for the Stuttgart Scorpions of the German Football League. He also has a YouTube channel which has almost a million subscribers. In college, he played for the University of Southern California Trojans of the Pac-12 Conference. He originally joined the USC Trojans baseball team as a center fielder and also competed for the USC Track and Field team in the javelin throw.

== Early life ==
Born and raised in Irvine, California, Sullivan attended Lutheran High School of Orange County in Orange, California. During his high school career, Sullivan played quarterback for the men's varsity football team and center field for the men's baseball team.

== College career ==
Sullivan originally committed to Duke University to play baseball but revoked his decision and chose to attend the University of Southern California on baseball scholarship. He joined the football team as a walk-on. Sullivan redshirted the 2012 season in football, sitting behind Matt Barkley, Max Wittek, and Cody Kessler. As a freshman center fielder, Sullivan played in 26 games earning a .267 batting average, 4 RBIs and 2 steals.

As a sophomore, Sullivan left the baseball team, choosing to focus on football. He earned USCs Offensive Scout Team Player of the Year award while running scout team quarterback. As scout team quarterback, Sullivan faced many NFL prospects, including Leonard Williams, Devon Kennard, Hayes Pullard, and Nickell Robey.

Following his redshirt sophomore football season, Sullivan elected to join the USC Track and Field team alongside teammate Adoree' Jackson. Sullivan competed in the Javelin Throw, with a best mark of 176-10.

That same spring, Sullivan was awarded a football scholarship from then head coach Steve Sarkisian. He served as USCs placekick holder for the 2014-2015 and 2015-2016 seasons.

In August 2014, Sullivan (Business Major, Film Minor) was named USC student-athlete of the week by athletic director Pat Haden.

== GFL career ==
In the 2017 German Football League Season, Sullivan played for the Stuttgart Scorpions of the GFL South division. Stuttgart finished sixth out of eight teams in the South division with a 4-10 record, failing to qualify for the post-season.

== Personal life ==
Conner is one of five children. His older brother Shane also competed on the USC football team as a tight end and his sister K.C also participates in rowing and javelin throw for the USC track and field team. Conner is also known by his YouTube videos showing his former USC campus life and world adventure. His YouTube channel's name is Conner Sullivan where he posts travel vlogs. He currently resides in Los Angeles, California. Although in the past he has lived in Stuttgart, Germany while he was still playing football. But since he travels around the world, he constantly changes his residence with each trip.

One of his YouTube videos became a viral hit in April 2017 when he attended the soccer derby of VfB Stuttgart vs Karlsruher SC. He was there with the guest fans who rampaged later on.
