= 2017 USC Trojans football team =

American college football season

2017 USC Trojans football

Pac-12 champion Pac-12 South Division champion

Pac-12 Championship Game, W 31–28 vs. Stanford

Cotton Bowl Classic, L 7–24 vs. Ohio State
- Conference: Pac-12 Conference
- South Division

Ranking
- Coaches: No. 10
- AP: No. 12
- Record: 11–3 (8–1 Pac-12)
- Head coach: Clay Helton (2nd season)
- Offensive coordinator: Tee Martin (3rd season)
- Offensive scheme: Multiple
- Defensive coordinator: Clancy Pendergast (3rd season)
- Base defense: 5–2
- Captain: 4: Sam Darnold; Chris Hawkins; Uchenna Nwosu; Cameron Smith
- Home stadium: Los Angeles Memorial Coliseum

2017 Pac-12 Conference football standings
	Conf.			Overall
Team	W		L	W		L
North Division
No. 20 Stanford xy	7	–	2	9	–	5
No. 16 Washington x	7	–	2	10	–	3
Washington State	6	–	3	9	–	4
Oregon	4	–	5	7	–	6
California	2	–	7	5	–	7
Oregon State	0	–	9	1	–	11
South Division
No. 12 USC xy$	8	–	1	11	–	3
Arizona State	6	–	3	7	–	6
Arizona	5	–	4	7	–	6
UCLA	4	–	5	6	–	7
Utah	3	–	6	7	–	6
Colorado	2	–	7	5	–	7
Championship: USC 31, Stanford 28
$ – Conference champion; x – Division champion/co-champions; y – Championship game participant; Rankings from AP Poll

The 2017 USC Trojans football team represented the University of Southern California in the 2017 NCAA Division I FBS football season. They played their home games at the Los Angeles Memorial Coliseum as members of the South Division of the Pac-12 Conference. They were led by second-year head coach Clay Helton. They finished the season 11–3, 8–1 in Pac-12 play to be champions of the South Division. They represented the South Division in the Pac-12 Championship Game where they defeated Stanford to become Pac-12 Champions. They were invited to play in the Cotton Bowl where they were soundly defeated at the hands of Ohio State, 24–7.

== Personnel ==
=== Coaching staff ===
Name	Position	Seasons at USC	Alma mater	Before USC
Clay Helton	Head coach	7	Houston (1994)	Memphis – offensive coordinator (2009)
John Baxter	Special teams coordinator, tight ends coach	6	Iowa State (1987)	Michigan – special teams (2015)
Ronnie Bradford	Secondary coach	2	Colorado (1995)	LA Tech – defensive backs, special teams (2015)
Neil Callaway	Offensive line coach	2	Alabama (1977)	Western Kentucky – offensive line (2015)
Tyson Helton	Quarterbacks coach, pass game coordinator	2	Houston (1999)	Western Kentucky – quarterbacks, offensive coordinator (2015)
Tee Martin	Offensive coordinator, wide receivers coach	6	Tennessee (2000)	Kentucky – wide receivers (2011)
Deland McCullough	Tailbacks coach, run game coordinator	1	Miami (OH) (1995)	Indiana – tailbacks (2016)
Johnny Nansen	Linebackers coach, recruiting coordinator, assistant head coach	4	Washington State (1997)	Washington – special teams, running backs (2013)
Clancy Pendergast	Defensive coordinator	4	Arizona (1990)	San Francisco 49ers – linebackers (2015)
Kenechi Udeze	Defensive line coach	3	USC (2003)	Pittsburgh – asst. strength & conditioning (2014)
Ivan Lewis	Strength and conditioning	4	San Diego (2003)	Washington – strength & conditioning (2013)
Brett Arce	Defensive assistant (DB)	2	Stony Brook (2012)	Stony Brook – asst. tight ends (2015)
Austin Clark	Defensive assistant (DL)	2	California (2014)	California – recruiting assistant (2015)
Prentice Gill	Offensive assistant (WR)	2	Old Dominion (2012)	San Jose State – graduate assistant (DB) (2015)
Dane Stevens	Offensive assistant (OL)	3	USC (2016)	USC - student assistant coach (2016)
Bryan Ellis	Offensive analyst	1	UAB (2011)	Western Kentucky – Wide receivers coach (2015)

=== Roster ===
2017 USC Trojans Football roster
Quarterback: 13 Jack Sears – Freshman (6′3, 195); 14 Sam Darnold – (redshirt) Sophomore (6′4, 225); 15 Thomas Fitts – (redshirt) Sophomore (6′2, 195); 16 Holden Thomas – (redshirt) Freshman (6′5, 195); 19 Matt Fink – (redshirt) Freshman (6′3, 195); Tailback: 7 Stephen Carr – Freshman (6′0, 210); 25 Ronald Jones II – Junior (6′1, 195); 26 James Toland IV – (redshirt) Senior (5′11, 195); 28 Aca'Cedric Ware – Junior (6′0, 195); 29 Vavae Malepeai – (redshirt) Freshman (6′0, 190); 30 Corbin Jountti – (redshirt) Senior (6′0, 205); 37 Ben Easington – Freshman (5′10, 205); 38 Chris Edmondson – (redshirt) Freshman (5′11, 210); Fullback: 47 Reuben Peters – (redshirt) Junior (6′0, 225); Wide receiver: 1 Joseph Lewis IV – Freshman (6′2, 205); 4 Steven Mitchell– (redshirt) Senior (5′10, 190); 6 Michael Pittman Jr. – Sophomore (6′4, 210); 9 Randal Grimes – Freshman (6′4, 205); 10 Jalen Greene – (redshirt) Junior (6′1, 200) (+QB); 15 Keyshawn 'Pie' Young – Sophomore (5′11, 175) (+CB); 17 Josh Imatorbhebhe – (redshirt) Freshman (6′2, 210); 21 Tyler Vaughns – (redshirt) Freshman (6′2, 180); 23 Velus Jones Jr. – (redshirt) Freshman (6′0, 185); 24 Jake Russell – (redshirt) Sophomore (5′11, 170); 36 Jack Webster – Freshman (6′0, 185); 41 Milo Stewart – (redshirt) Senior (5′9, 170); 80 Deontay Burnett – Junior (6′0, 170); 81 Trevon Sidney – (redshirt) Freshman (5′11, 170); 85 Jackson Boyer – (redshirt) Senior (6′3, 185); 87 Matt Nyman – Freshman (6′2, 185); Tight end: 82 Tyler Petite – Junior (6′5, 235); 83 Josh Falo – Freshman (6′6, 235); 84 Erik Krommenhoek – Freshman (6′5, 245); 87 Alec Hursh – (redshirt) Junior (6′3, 210); 88 Daniel Imatorbhebhe – (redshirt) Sophomore (6′4, 240); 89 Austin Applebee – (redshirt) Junior (6′6, 240)	Offensive Lineman: 50 Toa Lobendahn – OT – (redshirt) Junior (6′3, 295); 52 Jacob Daniel – OG – Junior (6′4, 310); 54 Jalen McKenzie – OG – Freshman (6′5, 307); 56 Jordan Austin – OG-OT – (redshirt) Junior (6′5, 300); 60 Viane Talamaivao – OG – Senior (6′2, 315); 62 Brett Neilon – C – Freshman (6′2, 295); 63 Roy Hemsley – OG-OT – (redshirt) Sophomore (6′5, 310); 64 Richie Wenzel – C – (redshirt) Junior (6′3, 250); 65 Frank Martin II – OG – (redshirt) Freshman (6′5, 310); 66 Cole Smith – C – (redshirt) Sophomore (6′4, 280); 68 Alijah Vera-Tucker – OG-OT – Freshman (6′4, 300); 70 Chuma Edoga – OT – Junior (6′4, 290); 72 Andrew Vorhees – OT-OG – Freshman (6′6, 290); 73 Austin Jackson – OT – Freshman (6′6, 290); 74 Nico Falah – C-OT – (redshirt) Senior (6′4, 280); 76 Clayton Johnston – OT – (redshirt) Sophomore (6′6, 285); 77 Chris Brown – OG-OT – (redshirt) Junior (6′5, 300); 78 Nathan Smith – OT – (redshirt) Freshman (6′6, 275); Defensive tackle: 44 Malik Dorton – (redshirt) Junior (6′2, 280); 51 Marlon Tuipulotu – Freshman (6′3, 295); 78 Jay Tufele – Freshman (6′3, 295); 79 Connor Rossow – (redshirt) Freshman (6′2, 305); 89 Christian Rector – (redshirt) Sophomore (6′5, 275); 91 Brandon Pili – Freshman (6′4, 320); 93 Liam Jimmons – (redshirt) Freshman (6′5, 280); 94 Rasheem Green – Junior (6′5, 280); 95 Kenny Bigelow Jr. – (redshirt) Senior (6′3, 295); 97 Jacob Lichtenstein – Freshman (6′5, 255); 98 Josh Fatu – Senior (6′3, 290); Defensive End / Outside Linebacker: 31 Hunter Echols – Freshman (6′5, 240); 45 Porter Gustin – Junior (6′5, 260); 49 Matt Bayle – (redshirt) Sophomore (6′2, 215); 53 Bryce Matthews – Freshman (6′3, 220); 90 Connor Murphy – Sophomore (6′7, 255); 99 Oluwole Betizu Jr. – Sophomore (6′3, 250); Placekicker: 40 Chase McGrath – Freshman (6′0, 190); 49 Michael Brown – (redshirt) Freshman (6′2, 195); Holder: 46 Wyatt Schmidt – (redshirt) Junior (6′3, 210) (+K)	Linebacker: 10 John Houston Jr. – (redshirt) Sophomore (6′3, 220); 13 Vi Jones – Freshman (6′3, 220); 34 Olajuwon Tucker – Senior (6′3, 230); 35 Cameron Smith – Junior (6′2, 245); 41 Juliano Falaniko – Freshman (6′4, 220); 42 Uchenna Nwosu – Senior (6′3, 235); 50 Grant Moore – (redshirt) Junior (6′0, 210); 52 Christian Herrera – (redshirt) Senior (6′1, 210); 54 Tayler Katoa – Freshman (6′2, 220); 56 Jordan Iosefa – Sophomore (6′2, 215); Cornerback: 8 Iman Marshall – Junior (6′1, 200); 9 Greg Johnson – Freshman (5′11, 195); 16 Dominic Davis – Junior (5′10, 180) (+TB); 18 Jalen Jones – (redshirt) Junior (5′8, 165); 22 Je'Quari Godfrey – Freshman (6′2, 185); 23 Jonathan Lockett – Senior (5′11, 180); 24 Isaiah Langley – Junior (6′0, 170); 25 Jack Jones – Sophomore (5′11, 170); 27 Ajene Harris – (redshirt) Junior (5′11, 190); 30 Yoofi Quansah – (redshirt) Senior (5′8, 170); Safety: 2 Bubba Bolden – Freshman (6′3, 190); 4 Chris Hawkins – (redshirt) Senior (5′11, 185); 6 Isaiah Pola-Mao – Freshman (6′4, 200); 7 Marvell Tell – Junior (6′3, 190); 14 Ykili Ross – (redshirt) Sophomore (6′0, 200) (+CB); 21 Jamel Cook – (redshirt) Freshman (6′3, 185); 26 Davonte Nunnery – (redshirt) Junior (5′10, 200); 28 C.J. Pollard – (redshirt) Freshman (6′1, 185); 31 Richard Hagestad – (redshirt) Freshman (6′1, 205); 37 Matt Lopes – (redshirt) Senior (5′11, 195); Long snappers: 48 Damon Johnson – Freshman (6′0, 205); 61 Jake Olson – (redshirt) Sophomore (6′4, 210); Punter: 36 Chris Tilbey – (redshirt) Junior (6′5, 205); 46 Reid Budrovich – (redshirt) Junior (5′11, 185); 47 James Bermingham Jr. – (redshirt) Junior (6′4, 185)
2017 USC Football Roster (07/26/2017)

=== Returning starters ===
USC returns 26 starters in 2017, including 12 on offense, 11 on defense, and 3 on special teams.

Key departures include Justin Davis (TB – 6 games), JuJu Smith-Schuster (WR – 13 games), Darreus Rogers (WR – 13 games), De'Quan Hampton (WR), Isaac Whitney (WR), Taylor McNamara (TE – 11 games), Zach Banner (OT – 11 games), Chad Wheeler (OT – 11 games), Damien Mama (OL – 12 games), Jordan Simmons (OL – 2 games), Stevie Tu'ikolovatu (DT – 12 games), Quinton Powell (LB), Michael Hutchings (ILB – 13 games), Adoree' Jackson (CB – 13 games), Leon McQuay III (S – 12 games), Zach Smith (LS – 13 games).

Other departures include Joel Foy (LB), Deion Hart (S).

==== Offense (12) ====
Player	Class	Position	Games started
Sam Darnold	Sophomore (redshirt)	Quarterback	10 games
Ronald Jones II	Junior	Tailback	7 games
Reuben Peters	Junior (redshirt)	Fullback	11 games
Steven Mitchell	Senior (redshirt)	Wide receiver	3 games
Deontay Burnett	Junior	Wide receiver	5 games
Daniel Imatorbhebhe	Sophomore (redshirt)	Tight end	5 games
Tyler Petite	Junior	Tight end	2 games
Viane Talamaivao	Senior	Offensive guard	13 games
Nico Falah	Senior (redshirt)	Center	12 games
Toa Lobendahn	Junior (redshirt)	Center	1 game
Chuma Edoga	Junior	Offensive tackle	2 games
Chris Brown	Junior (redshirt)	Offensive line	1 game

==== Defense (12) ====
Player	Class	Position	Games started
Rasheem Green	Junior	Defensive tackle	12 games
Malik Dorton	Junior (redshirt)	Defensive tackle	2 games
Josh Fatu	Senior	Defensive tackle	1 game
Porter Gustin	Junior	Outside Linebacker	13 games
Cameron Smith	Junior	Inside linebacker	13 games
Uchenna Nwosu	Senior	Linebacker	13 games
Iman Marshall	Junior	Cornerback	13 games
Jonathan Lockett	Senior	Cornerback	5 games
Ajene Harris	Junior (redshirt)	Cornerback	4 games
Marvell Tell	Junior	Safety	13 games
Chris Hawkins	Senior (redshirt)	Safety	4 games

==== Special teams (3) ====
Player	Class	Position	Games started
Matt Boermeester	Senior (redshirt)	Kicker	13 games
Chris Tilbey	Junior (redshirt)	Punter	13 games
Wyatt Schmidt	Junior (redshirt)	Holder	13 games

=== Transfers ===
The Trojans lost 5 players due to transfer. One transfer during the 2017 season.

Name	Number	Pos.	Height	Weight	Year	Hometown	Transfer to
Max Browne	#4	QB	6'5	220	Junior (redshirt)	Sammamish, WA	Pitt
Kevin Scott	#53	DT	6'5	315	Junior	Los Angeles, CA	Arizona Western / Nevada
Khaliel Rodgers Sr.	#62	OG	6'3	315	Junior (redshirt)	New Castle, DE	North Carolina
E.J. Price	#75	OT	6'6	325	Freshman	Dacula, GA	Kentucky
Noah Jefferson	#91	DT	6'6	315	Sophomore	Las Vegas, NV	Arizona Western / Ole Miss
Cary Angeline	#86	TE	6'6	230	Freshman (redshirt)	Exton, PA	N.C. State

=== Depth chart ===
Defense

FS
Marvell Tell
Matt Lopes
Richard Hagestad

WLB	SLB
Cameron Smith	John Houston Jr.
Jordan Iosefa	Levi Jones
Olajuwon Tucker	Christian Herrera

SS
Chris Hawkins
C.J. Pollard
Bubba Bolden

CB
Iman Marshall
Ajene Harris
Ykili Ross

OLB	DT	NT	DT	DE
Uchenna Nwosu	Christian Rector	Josh Fatu	Rasheem Green	Connor Murphy
Oluwole Betiku Jr.	Malik Dorton	Brandon Pili	Liam Jimmons	Juliano Falaniko
-	-	-	-	-

CB
Jack Jones
Isaiah Langley
Greg Johnson

Offense

WR
Deontay Burnett
Velus Jones Jr.
Randal Grimes

WR
Steven Mitchell
Michael Pittman Jr.
Joseph Lewis IV

LT	LG	C	RG	RT
Toa Lobendahn	Chris Brown	Nico Falah	Andrew Vorhees	Chuma Edoga
Austin Jackson	Roy Hemsley	Cole Smith	Jordan Austin	Clayton Johnston
-	Jacob Daniel	Richie Wenzel	Frank Martin II	-

TE
Tyler Petite
Daniel Imatorbhebhe
Josh Falo

WR
Tyler Vaughns
Trevon Sidney
Josh Imatorbhebhe

QB
Sam Darnold
Matt Fink
Jack Sears

Key reserves
Offense
- James Toland IV – TB
- Erik Krommenhoek – TE
- Austin Applebee – TE
- Alijah Vera-Tucker – OT
- Jalen McKenzie – OG
- Brett Neilon – C
Defense
- Grant Moore – ILB
- Je'Quari Godfrey – CB
- Dominic Davis – CB
Out
- Stephen Carr – TB - (Foot)
- Jamel Cook – S - (Illness)
- Hunter Echols – LB - (Hip)
- Chuma Edoga – OT - (Ankle)
- Jalen Greene – WR - (Concussion)
- Damon Johnson – LS - (Concussion)
- Jacob Lichtenstein – DT - (Back)
- Nathan Smith – OT - (Knee)
- Jay Tufele – DT - (Back)
Out (Season)
- Michael Brown – K - (Knee)
- Greg Johnson – CB - (Shoulder)
- Tayler Katoa – ILB - (Knee)
- Jonathan Lockett – CB - (Hip)
- Isaiah Pola-Mao – S - (Shoulder)
- Viane Talamaivao – OG - (Pectoral)
- Marlon Tuipulotu – DT - (Back)
- Keyshawn 'Pie' Young – WR - (Hamstring)
Out (Indefinitely)
- Porter Gustin – OLB - (Shoulder/Toe)
Left Team
- Kenny Bigelow Jr. – DT (Coaching)
(Transfer out)
- Cary Angeline – TE

RB
Ronald Jones II
Aca'Cedric Ware
Vavae Malepeai

Special teams
PK Chase McGrath
PK Wyatt Schmidt
P Reid Budrovich
P Chris Tilbey
KR Jack Jones, Velus Jones Jr. & Ajene Harris
PR Jack Jones, Velus Jones Jr. & Ajene Harris
LS Jake Olson
H Wyatt Schmidt

Projecting Depth Chart 2017

True Freshman
Double Position : *

=== Recruiting class ===
College recruiting (2017)
Name	Hometown	School	Height	Weight	Commit date
Stephen Carr #3 TB	Fontana, California	Summit High School	6 ft 0 in (1.83 m)	202 lb (92 kg)	February 1, 2017 (Signed) / March 23, 2015 (Committed)
Stephen Carr #3 TB	Recruit ratings: Scout: 247Sports: ESPN:				
Joseph Lewis IV #4 WR	Los Angeles, California	Hawkins High School	6 ft 2 in (1.88 m)	204 lb (93 kg)	February 1, 2017 (Signed) / February 1, 2017 (Committed)
Joseph Lewis IV #4 WR	Recruit ratings: Scout: 247Sports: ESPN:				
Austin Jackson #8 OT	Phoenix, Arizona	North Canyon High School	6 ft 6 in (1.98 m)	280 lb (130 kg)	February 1, 2017 (Signed) / February 1, 2017 (Committed)
Austin Jackson #8 OT	Recruit ratings: Scout: 247Sports: ESPN:				
Jay Tufele #3 DT	South Jordan, Utah	Bingham High School	6 ft 3 in (1.91 m)	297 lb (135 kg)	February 1, 2017 (Signed) / February 1, 2017 (Committed)
Jay Tufele #3 DT	Recruit ratings: Scout: 247Sports: ESPN:				
Marlon Tuipulotu #5 DT	Independence, Oregon	Central High School	6 ft 2 in (1.88 m)	295 lb (134 kg)	January 30, 2017 (Enrolled) / January 23, 2017 (Committed)
Marlon Tuipulotu #5 DT	Recruit ratings: Scout: 247Sports: ESPN:				
Bubba Bolden #6 S	Las Vegas, Nevada	Bishop Gorman High School	6 ft 3 in (1.91 m)	190 lb (86 kg)	February 1, 2017 (Signed) / January 7, 2017 (Committed)
Bubba Bolden #6 S	Recruit ratings: Scout: 247Sports: ESPN:				
Levi Jones #6 OLB	Austin, Texas	Westlake High School	6 ft 3 in (1.91 m)	215 lb (98 kg)	February 1, 2017 (Signed) / February 1, 2017 (Committed)
Levi Jones #6 OLB	Recruit ratings: Scout: 247Sports: ESPN:				
Greg Johnson #1 ATH CB	Los Angeles, California	Hawkins High School	5 ft 10 in (1.78 m)	185 lb (84 kg)	February 1, 2017 (Signed) / February 1, 2017 (Committed)
Greg Johnson #1 ATH CB	Recruit ratings: Scout: 247Sports: ESPN:				
Jack Sears #5 QB-Pro	San Clemente, California	San Clemente High School	6 ft 3 in (1.91 m)	200 lb (91 kg)	January 11, 2017 (Enrolled) / November 13, 2016 (Committed)
Jack Sears #5 QB-Pro	Recruit ratings: Scout: 247Sports: ESPN:				
Alijah Vera-Tucker #15 OT	Oakland, California	Bishop O'Dowd High School	6 ft 4 in (1.93 m)	291 lb (132 kg)	February 1, 2017 (Signed) / August 5, 2016 (Committed)
Alijah Vera-Tucker #15 OT	Recruit ratings: Scout: 247Sports: ESPN:				
Isaiah Pola-Mao #14 S	Phoenix, Arizona	Mountain Pointe High School	6 ft 4 in (1.93 m)	190 lb (86 kg)	February 1, 2017 (Signed) / January 27, 2017 (Committed)
Isaiah Pola-Mao #14 S	Recruit ratings: Scout: 247Sports: ESPN:				
Hunter Echols #9 WDE	Los Angeles, California	Cathedral High School	6 ft 4 in (1.93 m)	231 lb (105 kg)	February 1, 2017 (Signed) / August 5, 2016 (Committed)
Hunter Echols #9 WDE	Recruit ratings: Scout: 247Sports: ESPN:				
Josh Falo #4 TE	Sacramento, California	Inderkum High School	6 ft 5 in (1.96 m)	235 lb (107 kg)	February 1, 2017 (Signed) / February 1, 2017 (Committed)
Josh Falo #4 TE	Recruit ratings: Scout: 247Sports: ESPN:				
Brett Neilon #2 C	Rancho Santa Margarita, California	Santa Margarita Catholic High School	6 ft 2 in (1.88 m)	280 lb (130 kg)	February 1, 2017 (Signed) / June 8, 2016 (Committed)
Brett Neilon #2 C	Recruit ratings: Scout: 247Sports: ESPN:				
Andrew Vorhees #35 OT	Kingsburg, California	Kingsburg High School	6 ft 6 in (1.98 m)	290 lb (130 kg)	January 11, 2017 (Enrolled) / June 10, 2016 (Committed)
Andrew Vorhees #35 OT	Recruit ratings: Scout: 247Sports: ESPN:				
Randal Grimes #23 ATH WR	Las Vegas, Nevada	Desert Pines High School	6 ft 4 in (1.93 m)	205 lb (93 kg)	February 1, 2017 (Signed) / April 16, 2016 (Committed)
Randal Grimes #23 ATH WR	Recruit ratings: Scout: 247Sports: ESPN:				
Juliano Falaniko #17 ILB	Pago Pago, American Samoa	Leone High School	6 ft 4 in (1.93 m)	200 lb (91 kg)	February 1, 2017 (Signed) / April 23, 2016 (Committed)
Juliano Falaniko #17 ILB	Recruit ratings: Scout: 247Sports: ESPN:				
Tayler Katoa #33 ATH OLB	Layton, Utah	Layton High School	6 ft 2 in (1.88 m)	222 lb (101 kg)	January 11, 2017 (Enrolled) / December 15, 2016 (Committed)
Tayler Katoa #33 ATH OLB	Recruit ratings: Scout: 247Sports: ESPN:				
Jacob Lichtenstein #19 SDE	Fort Lauderdale, Florida	Cypress Bay High School	6 ft 5 in (1.96 m)	248 lb (112 kg)	February 1, 2017 (Signed) / August 16, 2016 (Committed)
Jacob Lichtenstein #19 SDE	Recruit ratings: Scout: 247Sports: ESPN:				
Erik Krommenhoek #21 TE	Danville, California	Monte Vista High School	6 ft 6 in (1.98 m)	243 lb (110 kg)	February 1, 2017 (Signed) / June 20, 2016 (Committed)
Erik Krommenhoek #21 TE	Recruit ratings: Scout: 247Sports: ESPN:				
Je'Quari Godfrey #71 CB	Oakland, California	Bishop O'Dowd High School	6 ft 2 in (1.88 m)	185 lb (84 kg)	February 1, 2017 (Signed) / January 15, 2017 (Committed)
Je'Quari Godfrey #71 CB	Recruit ratings: Scout: 247Sports: ESPN:				
Brandon Pili #60 DT	Portland, Oregon	Westview High School	6 ft 4 in (1.93 m)	310 lb (140 kg)	February 1, 2017 (Signed) / January 21, 2017 (Committed)
Brandon Pili #60 DT	Recruit ratings: Scout: 247Sports: ESPN:				
Damon Johnson #4 LS	Glendora, California	Glendora High School / Citrus JC	6 ft 0 in (1.83 m)	205 lb (93 kg)	January 11, 2017 (Enrolled) / December 27, 2016 (Committed)
Damon Johnson #4 LS	Recruit ratings: Scout: 247Sports: ESPN:				
Jalen McKenzie #19 OG	Concord, California	Clayton Valley High School	6 ft 5 in (1.96 m)	307 lb (139 kg)	Blueshirt 18' - January 16, 2017 (Committed)
Jalen McKenzie #19 OG	Recruit ratings: Scout: 247Sports: ESPN:				
Austin Applebee; TE	Seneca, Illinois	Arizona Western College	6 ft 6 in (1.98 m)	240 lb (110 kg)	Walk-On / 2017 (Transfer)
Austin Applebee; TE	Recruit ratings: Scout: 247Sports: ESPN:				
Chase McGrath; K	Newport Beach, California	Mater Dei High School	6 ft 0 in (1.83 m)	190 lb (86 kg)	Walk-On / March 10, 2017 (Signed)
Chase McGrath; K	Recruit ratings: Scout: 247Sports: ESPN:				
Bean Easington; TB	Evanston, Illinois	Evanston High School	5 ft 10 in (1.78 m)	205 lb (93 kg)	Walk-On / August 1, 2017 (Signed)
Bean Easington; TB	Recruit ratings: Scout: 247Sports: ESPN:				
Jack Webster; WR	La Canada, California	Loyola High School	6 ft 0 in (1.83 m)	185 lb (84 kg)	Walk-On / August 1, 2017 (Signed)
Jack Webster; WR	Recruit ratings: Scout: 247Sports: ESPN:				
Matt Nyman; WR	Los Angeles, California	Brentwood High School	6 ft 2 in (1.88 m)	185 lb (84 kg)	Walk-On / August 1, 2017 (Signed)
Matt Nyman; WR	Recruit ratings: Scout: 247Sports: ESPN:				
Bryce Matthews; OLB	Los Angeles, California	Bishop Montgomery High School	6 ft 3 in (1.91 m)	220 lb (100 kg)	Walk-On / August 1, 2017 (Signed)
Bryce Matthews; OLB	Recruit ratings: Scout: 247Sports: ESPN:				
Corbin Jountti; TB	Bakersfield, California	Northern Arizona Lumberjacks football	6 ft 0 in (1.83 m)	205 lb (93 kg)	Walk-On / 2017 (Transfer)
Corbin Jountti; TB	Recruit ratings: Scout: 247Sports: ESPN:				
Overall recruit ranking: Scout: #7 247Sports: #6 ESPN: #8
Note: In many cases, Scout, Rivals, 247Sports, On3, and ESPN may conflict in their listings of height and weight.; In these cases, the average was taken. ESPN grades are on a 100-point scale.; Sources: "2017 Team Ranking". Rivals.com.

=== Scholarship distribution chart ===
Position	Freshman (36)	Sophomore (15)	Junior (23)	Senior (10)	2018 commit (4) 2018 signed (10)	2019 commit (2)
QB 3 (1)	Matt Fink; Jack Sears	Sam Darnold	–	–	JT Daniels	-
TB 5 (1)	Stephen Carr; Vavae Malepeai	–	Ronald Jones II; Aca'Cedric Ware	James Toland IV*	Markese Stepp	–
FB 1	–	–	Reuben Peters*	–	–	–
WR 10	Randal Grimes; Josh Imatorbhebhe; Velus Jones Jr. Joseph Lewis IV; Trevon Sidney; Tyler Vaughns	Michael Pittman Jr.	Deontay Burnett; Jalen Greene	Steven Mitchell Jr.	–	–
TE 4	Josh Falo; Erik Krommenhoek	Daniel Imatorbhebhe	Tyler Petite	–	–	–
OL 16 (2)	Austin Jackson; Frank Martin II; Brett Neilon; Jalen McKenzie; Nathan Smith; Alijah Vera-Tucker; Andrew Vorhees	Roy Hemsley; Clayton Johnston; Cole Smith	Jordan Austin; Chris Brown; Chuma Edoga; Toa Lobendahn	Nico Falah; Viane Talamaivao	Justin Dedich; Liam Douglass	–
DT 10 (3)	Liam Jimmons; Jacob Lichtenstein; Brandon Pili; Jay Tufele; Marlon Tuipulotu	Christian Rector	Jacob Daniel; Malik Dorton; Rasheem Green	Josh Fatu	Tuli Letuligasenoa; Caleb Tremblay; Trevor Trout	–
DE / OLB 6 (3)	Hunter Echols	Oluwole Betiku Jr. Connor Murphy	Porter Gustin	Uchenna Nwosu; Olajuwon Tucker	Kana'i Mauga; Abdul-Malik McClain; Raymond Scott	–
ILB 7 (1)	Juliano Falaniko; Levi Jones; Tayler Katoa	John Houston Jr. Jordan Iosefa	Grant Moore*; Cameron Smith	–	Palaie Gaoteote IV	–
CB 9 (2)	Je'Quari Godfrey; Greg Johnson	Jack Jones; Keyshawn Pie Young	Dominic Davis; Ajene Harris; Isaiah Langley; Iman Marshall	Jonathan Lockett	Marcus Johnson; Chase Williams	–
S 8 (1)	Bubba Bolden; Jamel Cook; Isaiah Pola-Mao; C.J. Pollard	Ykili Ross	Marvell Tell	Chris Hawkins; Matt Lopes*	Talanoa Hufanga	–
SP 5	Damon Johnson; Chase McGrath*	Michael Brown	Chris Tilbey; Reid Budrovich*	-	–	–
ATH (–)	x	x	x	x	–	–

redshirt year used / redshirt year eligible / * : Former walk-on

- 85 scholarships permitted, 85 currently allotted to players.

- USC can sign 15-20 players in the class of 2018 count contingent on 9 graduating SRs (Lockett and Tucker burned redshirt in 2017), NFL early entries and transfers.

Projecting Scholarship Distribution 2017

== 2017 NFL draft ==
=== NFL Combine ===
The official list of participants for the 2017 NFL Combine was released on Wednesday (February 15), featuring USC football players OT Zach Banner, TB Justin Davis, CB Adoree’ Jackson, OG Damien Mama, WR Darreus Rogers, WR JuJu Smith-Schuster, NT Stevie Tu’ikolovatu and OT Chad Wheeler.

The eight Trojans were tested at the Combine in Indianapolis beginning on February 28 through March 6.

Trojans who didn't nab an invite include S Leon McQuay III, TE Taylor McNamara, LB Michael Hutchings, LB Quinton Powell, OG Jordan Simmons, WR De'Quan Hampton, WR Isaac Whitney & LS Zach Smith. They waited until USC's Pro Day to get in front of NFL scouts

=== Team players drafted into the NFL ===
Player	Position	Round	Pick	NFL Team
Adoree' Jackson (Junior)	Cornerback	1	18	Tennessee Titans
JuJu Smith-Schuster (Junior)	Wide receiver	2	62 (30)	Pittsburgh Steelers
Zach Banner	Offensive tackle	4	137 (30)	Indianapolis Colts
Leon McQuay III	Safety	6	218 (35)	Kansas City Chiefs
Stevie Tu'ikolovatu	Defensive tackle	7	223 (5)	Tampa Bay Buccaneers
Chad Wheeler	Offensive tackle	UDFA	-	New York Giants
Damien Mama (Junior)	Offensive guard	UDFA	-	Kansas City Chiefs
Darreus Rogers	Wide receiver	UDFA	-	Seattle Seahawks
Justin Davis	Tailback	UDFA	-	Los Angeles Rams
Isaac Whitney	Wide receiver	UDFA	-	Oakland Raiders
De'Quan Hampton	Wide receiver	UDFA	-	Detroit Lions
Taylor McNamara	Tight end	UDFA	-	Cleveland Browns
Jordan Simmons	Offensive guard	UDFA	-	Oakland Raiders
Quinton Powell	Linebacker	UDFA	-	New Orleans Saints
Zach Smith	Long snapper	UDFA	-	-
* : Projecting Round

== Schedule ==
Date	Time	Opponent	Rank	Site	TV	Result	Attendance
September 2	2:15 p.m.	Western Michigan*	No. 4	Los Angeles Memorial Coliseum; Los Angeles, CA	P12N	W 49–31	61,125
September 9	5:30 p.m.	No. 14 Stanford	No. 4	Los Angeles Memorial Coliseum; Los Angeles, CA (rivalry)	FOX	W 42–24	77,614
September 16	5:30 p.m.	Texas*	No. 4	Los Angeles Memorial Coliseum; Los Angeles, CA	FOX	W 27–24 ^{2OT}	84,714
September 23	12:30 p.m.	at California	No. 5	California Memorial Stadium; Berkeley, CA	ABC	W 30–20	46,747
September 29	7:30 p.m.	at No. 16 Washington State	No. 5	Martin Stadium; Pullman, WA	ESPN	L 27–30	33,773
October 7	1:00 p.m.	Oregon State	No. 14	Los Angeles Memorial Coliseum; Los Angeles, CA	P12N	W 38–10	60,314
October 14	5:00 p.m.	Utah	No. 13	Los Angeles Memorial Coliseum; Los Angeles, CA	ABC	W 28–27	72,382
October 21	4:30 p.m.	at No. 13 Notre Dame*	No. 11	Notre Dame Stadium; Notre Dame, IN (Jeweled Shillelagh)	NBC	L 14–49	77,622
October 28	7:45 p.m.	at Arizona State	No. 21	Sun Devil Stadium; Tempe, AZ	ESPN	W 48–17	53,446
November 4	7:45 p.m.	No. 23 Arizona^{†}	No. 17	Los Angeles Memorial Coliseum; Los Angeles, CA	ESPN	W 49–35	70,225
November 11	1:00 p.m.	at Colorado	No. 11	Folsom Field; Boulder, CO	FOX	W 38–24	49,337
November 18	5:00 p.m.	UCLA	No. 10	Los Angeles Memorial Coliseum; Los Angeles, CA (Victory Bell)	ABC	W 28–23	82,407
December 1	5:00 p.m.	vs. No. 12 Stanford	No. 10	Levi's Stadium; Santa Clara, CA (Pac-12 Football Championship Game/rivalry)	ESPN	W 31–28	48,031
December 29	5:30 p.m.	vs. No. 5 Ohio State*	No. 8	AT&T Stadium; Arlington, TX (Cotton Bowl Classic)	ESPN	L 7–24	67,510
*Non-conference game; ^{†}Homecoming; Rankings from AP Poll & CFP Rankings (beginning in Week 9) released prior to game; All times are in Pacific time

== Game summaries ==
=== Western Michigan ===
Team	1	2	3	4	Total
Broncos	7	7	7	10	31
• Trojans	7	7	7	28	49

- Date: September 2
- Location: Los Angeles Memorial Coliseum, Los Angeles, California
- Game start: 2:22 p.m. PDT
- Elapsed time: 3:25
- Game attendance: 61,125
- Game weather: Cloudy; 98°F; wind 1 mph NNE
- Referee: Terry Leyden
- TV announcers (P12N): Roxy Bernstein, Anthony Herron and Lewis Johnson

Scoring summary
Q1	13:00	USC	Jones 16-yard run (McGrath kick)	USC 7–0
Q1	6:07	WMU	Bogan 4-yard run (Grant kick)	Tie 7–7
Q2	14:53	WMU	Wassink 7-yard run (Grant kick)	WMU 14–7
Q2	4:21	USC	Jones 1-yard run (McGrath kick)	Tie 14–14
Q3	9:11	WMU	Wassink 27-yard pass from Watson (Grant kick)	WMU 21–14
Q3	0:34	USC	Darnold 11-yard run (McGrath kick)	Tie 21–21
Q4	8:07	USC	Carr 1-yard run (McGrath kick)	USC 28–21
Q4	7:54	WMU	Phillips 100-yard kickoff return (Grant kick)	Tie 28–28
Q4	6:57	USC	Jones 37-yard run (McGrath kick)	USC 35–28
Q4	4:37	WMU	Grant 43-yard field goal	USC 35–31
Q4	3:49	USC	Carr 52-yard run (McGrath kick)	USC 42–31
Q4	3:13	USC	Tell 37-yard interception return (McGrath kick)	USC 49–31

The game featured the first on-field appearance by USC long snapper Jake Olson, who as a consequence of retinoblastoma had been blind since the age of 12. Olson successfully snapped the ball for extra point following a touchdown. Western Michigan was informed prior to the play being run and did not rush the line.

Statistics	Western Michigan	USC
First downs	24	25
Plays–yards	71–357	67–521
Rushes–yards	48–263	34–232
Passing yards	94	289
Passing: comp–att–int	12–23–1	23–33–2
Turnovers		
Time of possession	34:40	25:20

Team	Category	Player	Statistics
Western Michigan	Passing	Jon Wassink	11/22, 67 yards, INT
Western Michigan	Rushing	Jamauri Bogan	15 carries, 77 yards, TD
Western Michigan	Receiving	Anton Curtis	3 receptions, 30 yards
USC	Passing	Sam Darnold	23/33, 289 yards, 2 INT
USC	Rushing	Ronald Jones II	18 carries, 159 yards, 3 TD
USC	Receiving	Deontay Burnett	7 receptions, 142 yards

=== No. 14 Stanford ===
Team	1	2	3	4	Total
Cardinal	7	10	0	7	24
• Trojans	14	14	0	14	42

- Date: September 9
- Location: Los Angeles Memorial Coliseum, Los Angeles, California
- Game start: 5:40 p.m. PDT
- Elapsed time: 3:11
- Game attendance: 77,614
- Game weather: Scattered Clouds; 78°F; wind 6 mph W
- Referee: Chris Coyte
- TV announcers (Fox): Gus Johnson, Joel Klatt and Jenny Taft

Scoring summary
Q1	5:01	USC	Mitchell 4-yard pass from Darnold (McGrath kick)	USC 7–0
Q1	4:49	STAN	Love 75-yard run (Toner kick)	Tie 7–7
Q1	0:31	USC	Jones 1-yard run (McGrath kick)	USC 14–7
Q2	13:02	STAN	Schultz 1-yard pass from Chryst (Toner kick)	Tie 14–14
Q2	11:42	USC	Burnett 22-yard pass from Darnold (McGrath kick)	USC 21–14
Q2	2:43	STAN	Toner 36-yard field goal	USC 21–17
Q2	0:48	USC	Burnett 25-yard pass from Darnold (McGrath kick)	USC 28–17
Q4	9:42	USC	Mitchell 11-yard pass from Darnold (McGrath kick)	USC 35–17
Q4	6:41	STAN	Arcega–Whiteside 3-yard pass from Chryst (Toner kick)	USC 35–24
Q4	4:15	USC	Jones 23-yard run (McGrath kick)	USC 42–24

Statistics	Stanford	USC
First downs	16	28
Plays–yards	54–342	74–623
Rushes–yards	26–170	48–307
Passing yards	172	316
Passing: comp–att–int	15–28–0	21–26–2
Turnovers		
Time of possession	25:25	34:35

Team	Category	Player	Statistics
Stanford	Passing	Keller Chryst	15/28, 172 yards, 2 TD
Stanford	Rushing	Bryce Love	17 carries, 160 yards, TD
Stanford	Receiving	J. J. Arcega-Whiteside	4 receptions, 67 yards, TD
USC	Passing	Sam Darnold	21/26, 316 yards, 4 TD, 2 INT
USC	Rushing	Ronald Jones II	23 carries, 116 yards, 2 TD
USC	Receiving	Deontay Burnett	9 receptions, 121 yards, 2 TD

=== Texas ===
Team	1	2	3	4	OT	2OT	Total
Longhorns	0	7	3	7	7	0	24
• Trojans	0	14	0	3	7	3	27

- Date: September 16
- Location: Los Angeles Memorial Coliseum, Los Angeles, California
- Game start: 5:40 p.m. PDT
- Elapsed time: 4:01
- Game attendance: 84,714
- Game weather: Hazy Skies; 75°F; wind 8 mph WSW
- Referee: Land Clark
- TV announcers (Fox): Gus Johnson, Joel Klatt and Jenny Taft

Scoring summary
Q2	2:40	USC	Burnett 15-yard pass from Darnold (McGrath kick)	USC 7–0
Q2	0:19	TEX	Elliott 38-yard interception return (Rowland kick)	Tie 7–7
Q2	0:00	USC	Jones 56-yard pass from Darnold (McGrath kick)	USC 14–7
Q3	9:30	TEX	Rowland 39-yard field goal	USC 14–10
Q4	0:45	TEX	Foreman 17-yard pass from Ehlinger (Rowland kick)	TEX 17–14
Q4	0:00	USC	McGrath 31-yard field goal	Tie 17–17
OT		USC	Burnett 25-yard pass from Darnold (McGrath kick)	USC 24–17
OT		TEX	Brewer 3-yard pass from Ehlinger (Rowland kick)	Tie 24–24
2OT		USC	McGrath 43-yard field goal	USC 27–24

Statistics	Texas	USC
First downs	17	25
Plays–yards	75–366	88–468
Rushes–yards	35–68	37–71
Passing yards	298	397
Passing: comp–att–int	21–40–2	28–51–2
Turnovers		
Time of possession	27:14	32:46

Team	Category	Player	Statistics
Texas	Passing	Sam Ehlinger	21/40, 298 yards, 2 TD, 2 INT
Texas	Rushing	Sam Ehlinger	19 carries, 10 yards
Texas	Receiving	Collin Johnson	7 receptions, 191 yards
USC	Passing	Sam Darnold	28/49, 397 yards, 3 TD, 2 INT
USC	Rushing	Ronald Jones II	18 carries, 47 yards
USC	Receiving	Deontay Burnett	8 receptions, 123 yards, 2 TD

=== California ===
Team	1	2	3	4	Total
• Trojans	3	10	0	17	30
Golden Bears	3	10	0	7	20

- Date: September 23
- Location: California Memorial Stadium, Berkeley, California
- Game start: 12:43 p.m. PDT
- Elapsed time: 3:35
- Game attendance: 46,747
- Game weather: Clear and Sunny; 72°F; wind 12 mph N
- Referee: Mark Duddy
- TV announcers (ABC): Dave Pasch, Greg McElroy and Tom Luginbill

Scoring summary
Q1	10:46	CAL	Anderson 36-yard field goal	CAL 3–0
Q1	4:39	USC	McGrath 37-yard field goal	Tie 3–3
Q2	14:31	CAL	Enwere 1-yard run (Anderson kick)	CAL 10–3
Q2	12:20	USC	Petite 16-yard pass from Darnold (McGrath kick)	Tie 10–10
Q2	1:59	USC	McGrath 34-yard field goal	USC 13–10
Q2	0:00	CAL	Anderson 21-yard field goal	Tie 13–13
Q4	14:05	USC	McGrath 46-yard field goal	USC 16–13
Q4	13:11	USC	Carr 2-yard run (McGrath kick)	USC 23–13
Q4	10:56	USC	Burnett 4-yard pass from Darnold (McGrath kick)	USC 30–13
Q4	1:53	CAL	Veasy 8-yard pass from Bowers (Anderson kick)	USC 30–20

Statistics	USC	California
First downs	22	21
Plays–yards	76–356	85–416
Rushes–yards	38–133	33–113
Passing yards	223	303
Passing: comp–att–int	26–38–1	22–52–4
Turnovers		
Time of possession	31:00	29:00

Team	Category	Player	Statistics
USC	Passing	Sam Darnold	26/38, 223 yards, 2 TD, INT
USC	Rushing	Stephen Carr	20 carries, 82 yards, TD
USC	Receiving	Deontay Burnett	9 receptions, 76 yards, TD
California	Passing	Ross Bowers	22/50, 303 yards, TD, 4 INT
California	Rushing	Patrick Laird	15 carries, 82 yards
California	Receiving	Kanawai Noa	6 receptions, 110 yards

=== No. 16 Washington State ===
Team	1	2	3	4	Total
Trojans	7	10	3	7	27
• Cougars	3	14	3	10	30

- Date: September 29
- Location: Martin Stadium, Pullman, Washington
- Game start: 7:36 p.m. PDT
- Elapsed time: 3:46
- Game attendance: 33,773
- Game weather: Hazy; 64°F; wind 10 mph W
- Referee: Steve Strimling
- TV announcers (ESPN): Adam Amin, Dusty Dvoracek and Molly McGrath

Scoring summary
Q1	11:36	WSU	Powell 44-yard field goal	WSU 3–0
Q1	7:46	USC	Darnold 4-yard run (McGrath kick)	USC 7–3
Q2	14:48	WSU	Martin 28-yard pass from Falk (Powell kick)	WSU 10–7
Q2	11:25	USC	Jones 86-yard run (McGrath kick)	USC 14–10
Q2	9:47	USC	McGrath 20-yard field goal	USC 17–10
Q2	0:13	WSU	Morrow 1-yard run (Powell kick)	Tie 17–17
Q3	8:20	WSU	Powell 33-yard field goal	WSU 20–17
Q3	0:16	USC	McGrath 29-yard field goal	Tie 20–20
Q4	10:14	WSU	Morrow 23-yard pass from Falk (Powell kick)	WSU 27–20
Q4	5:01	USC	Darnold 2-yard run (McGrath kick)	Tie 27–27
Q4	1:40	WSU	Powell 32-yard field goal	WSU 30–27

Statistics	USC	Washington State
First downs	15	23
Plays–yards	58–327	81–462
Rushes–yards	29–163	30–122
Passing yards	164	340
Passing: comp–att–int	15–29–1	34–51–1
Turnovers		
Time of possession	24:33	35:27

Team	Category	Player	Statistics
USC	Passing	Sam Darnold	15/29, 164 yards, INT
USC	Rushing	Ronald Jones II	14 carries, 128 yards, TD
USC	Receiving	Tyler Vaughns	6 receptions, 89 yards
Washington State	Passing	Luke Falk	34/51, 340 yards, 2 TD, INT
Washington State	Rushing	James Williams	10 carries, 34 yards
Washington State	Receiving	Tav Martin Jr.	6 receptions, 55 yards, TD

=== Oregon State ===
Team	1	2	3	4	Total
Beavers	0	3	0	7	10
• Trojans	14	7	7	10	38

- Date: October 7
- Location: Los Angeles Memorial Coliseum, Los Angeles, California
- Game start: 1:07 p.m PDT
- Elapsed time: 3:12
- Game attendance: 60,314
- Game weather: Slight Haze; 96°F; wind 3 mph WSW
- Referee: Chris Coyte
- TV announcers (P12N): Roxy Bernstein, Chad Brown and Lewis Johnson

Scoring summary
Q1	11:29	USC	Vaughns 37-yard pass from Darnold (McGrath kick)	USC 7–0
Q1	8:49	USC	Jones 4-yard run (McGrath kick)	USC 14–0
Q2	14:17	ORST	Choukair 33-yard field goal	USC 14–3
Q2	10:01	USC	Burnett 16-yard pass from Darnold (McGrath kick)	USC 21–3
Q3	8:57	USC	Falo 30-yard pass from Darnold (McGrath kick)	USC 28–3
Q4	14:11	ORST	Pierce 6-yard run (Choukair kick)	USC 28–10
Q4	10:45	USC	McGrath 29-yard field goal	USC 31–10
Q4	6:19	USC	Fink 51-yard run (McGrath kick)	USC 38–10

Statistics	Oregon State	USC
First downs	16	26
Plays–yards	65–319	73–512
Rushes–yards	36–122	37–184
Passing yards	197	328
Passing: comp–att–int	16–29–1	24–36–1
Turnovers		
Time of possession	29:26	30:34

Team	Category	Player	Statistics
Oregon State	Passing	Darell Garretson	16/29, 197 yards, INT
Oregon State	Rushing	Artavis Pierce	12 carries, 60 yards, TD
Oregon State	Receiving	Seth Collins	5 receptions, 91 yards
USC	Passing	Sam Darnold	23/35, 316 yards, 3 TD, INT
USC	Rushing	Ronald Jones II	12 carries, 79 yards, TD
USC	Receiving	Tyler Vaughns	5 receptions, 68 yards, TD

=== Utah ===
Team	1	2	3	4	Total
Utes	7	14	0	6	27
• Trojans	7	0	7	14	28

- Date: October 14
- Location: Los Angeles Memorial Coliseum, Los Angeles, California
- Game start: 5:14 p.m. PDT
- Elapsed time: 3:30
- Game attendance: 72,382
- Game weather: Hazy; 84°F; wind 4 mph WSW
- Referee: Terry Leyden
- TV announcers (ABC): Steve Levy, Brian Griese and Todd McShay

Scoring summary
Q1	6:08	UTAH	Blair 18-yard fumble recovery (Gay kick)	UTAH 7–0
Q1	4:47	USC	Petite 52-yard pass from Darnold (McGrath kick)	Tie 7–7
Q2	13:10	UTAH	Williams 5-yard pass from Simpkins (Gay kick)	UTAH 14–7
Q2	4:49	UTAH	Simpkins 33-yard pass from Williams (Gay kick)	UTAH 21–7
Q3	5:56	USC	Petite 17-yard pass from Darnold (McGrath kick)	UTAH 21–14
Q4	13:34	USC	Falo 1-yard pass from Darnold (McGrath kick)	Tie 21–21
Q4	4:54	USC	Jones 11-yard run (McGrath kick)	USC 28–21
Q4	0:42	UTAH	Williams 1 yard run (run failed)	USC 28–27

Statistics	Utah	USC
First downs	20	30
Plays–yards	69–436	83–532
Rushes–yards	41–169	33–174
Passing yards	267	358
Passing: comp–att–int	17–28–1	27–50–0
Turnovers		
Time of possession	33:00	27:00

Team	Category	Player	Statistics
Utah	Passing	Troy Williams	16/27, 262 yards, TD, INT
Utah	Rushing	Zack Moss	20 carries, 141 yards
Utah	Receiving	Demari Simpkins	4 receptions, 58 yards, TD
USC	Passing	Sam Darnold	27/50, 358 yards, 3 TD
USC	Rushing	Ronald Jones II	17 carries, 111 yards, TD
USC	Receiving	Tyler Petite	3 receptions, 79 yards, 2 TD

=== No. 13 Notre Dame ===
Team	1	2	3	4	Total
Trojans	0	0	14	0	14
• Fighting Irish	14	14	14	7	49

- Date: October 21
- Location: Notre Dame Stadium, Notre Dame, Indiana
- Game start: 7:43 p.m EDT
- Elapsed time: 3:10
- Game attendance: 77,622
- Game weather: Partly Cloudy; 70°F; wind 9 mph SSE
- Referee: Jeff Heaser
- TV announcers (NBC): Mike Tirico, Doug Flutie and Kathryn Tappen

Scoring summary
Q1	12:45	ND	St. Brown 26-yard pass from Wimbush (Yoon kick)	ND 7–0
Q1	6:59	ND	Stepherson 23-yard pass from Wimbush (Yoon kick)	ND 14–0
Q2	7:43	ND	Adams 3-yard run (Yoon kick)	ND 21–0
Q2	3:54	ND	Wimbrush 4-yard run (Yoon kick)	ND 28–0
Q3	10:00	USC	Mitchell 5-yard pass from Darnold (McGrath kick)	ND 28–7
Q3	6:06	ND	Wimbush 7-yard run (Yoon kick)	ND 35–7
Q3	3:26	USC	Burnett 16-yard pass from Darnold (McGrath kick)	ND 35–14
Q3	3:07	ND	Adams 84-yard run (Yoon kick)	ND 42–14
Q4	13:17	ND	Adams 14-yard run (Yoon kick)	ND 49–14

Statistics	USC	Notre Dame
First downs	18	23
Plays–yards	67–336	69–497
Rushes–yards	31–76	47–377
Passing yards	260	120
Passing: comp–att–int	25–36–1	9–22–0
Turnovers		
Time of possession	31:36	28:24

Team	Category	Player	Statistics
USC	Passing	Sam Darnold	20/28, 229 yards, 2 TD, INT
USC	Rushing	Ronald Jones II	12 carries, 32 yards
USC	Receiving	Deontay Burnett	8 receptions, 113 yards, TD
Notre Dame	Passing	Brandon Wimbush	9/19, 120 yards, 2 TD
Notre Dame	Rushing	Josh Adams	19 carries, 191 yards, 3 TD
Notre Dame	Receiving	Kevin Stepherson	3 receptions, 58 yards, TD

=== Arizona State ===
Team	1	2	3	4	Total
• Trojans	14	17	7	10	48
Sun Devils	3	7	7	0	17

- Date: October 28
- Location: Sun Devil Stadium, Tempe, Arizona
- Game start: 7:51 p.m. PDT
- Elapsed time: 3:30
- Game attendance: 53,446
- Referee: Land Clark
- TV announcers (ESPN): Beth Mowins, Anthony Becht and Rocky Boiman

Scoring summary
Q1	11:27	USC	Burnett 32-yard pass from Darnold (McGrath kick)	USC 7–0
Q1	6:50	ASU	Ruiz 39-yard field goal	USC 7–3
Q1	2:25	USC	Vaughns 42-yard pass from Darnold (McGrath kick)	USC 14–3
Q2	14:24	USC	Jones 67-yard run (McGrath kick)	USC 21–3
Q2	6:02	USC	Vaughns 19-yard pass from Darnold (McGrath kick)	USC 28–3
Q2	0:52	USC	McGrath 51-yard field goal	USC 31–3
Q2	0:00	ASU	Williams 47-yard pass from Wilkins (Ruiz kick)	USC 31–10
Q3	11:30	ASU	Wilkins 1-yard run (Ruiz kick)	USC 31–17
Q3	10:10	USC	Jones 64-yard run (McGrath kick)	USC 38–17
Q4	10:36	USC	McGrath 33-yard field goal	USC 41—17
Q4	1:03	USC	Ross 37-yard interception return (McGrath kick)	USC 48–17

Statistics	USC	Arizona State
First downs	29	15
Plays–yards	81–607	61–357
Rushes–yards	46–341	30–79
Passing yards	266	278
Passing: comp–att–int	19–35–0	18–31–1
Turnovers		
Time of possession	34:03	25:57

Team	Category	Player	Statistics
USC	Passing	Sam Darnold	19/35, 266 yards, 3 TD
USC	Rushing	Ronald Jones II	18 carries, 216 yards, 2 TD
USC	Receiving	Tyler Vaughns	6 receptions, 126 yards, 2 TD
Arizona State	Passing	Manny Wilkins	17/29, 259 yards, TD
Arizona State	Rushing	Demario Richard	15 carries, 70 yards
Arizona State	Receiving	Kyle Williams	7 receptions, 121 yards, TD

=== No. 22 Arizona ===
Team	1	2	3	4	Total
Wildcats	0	6	14	15	35
• Trojans	7	14	7	21	49

- Date: November 4
- Location: Los Angeles Memorial Coliseum, Los Angeles, California
- Game start: 7:51 p.m. PDT
- Elapsed time: 3:43
- Game attendance: 70,225
- Game weather: Mostly Clear Skies; 64°F; wind 1 mph E
- Referee: Mark Duddy
- TV announcers (ESPN): Mark Jones, Rod Gilmore and Quint Kessenich

Scoring summary
Q1	9:28	USC	Greene 11-yard blocked punt return (McGrath kick)	USC 7–0
Q2	14:17	ARIZ	Havrisik 45-yard field goal	USC 7–3
Q2	8:50	USC	Vaughns 22-yard pass from Darnold (McGrath kick)	USC 14–3
Q2	6:04	USC	Mitchell 27-yard pass from Darnold (McGrath kick)	USC 21–3
Q2	2:14	ARIZ	Havrisik 43-yard field goal	USC 21–6
Q3	6:04	USC	Jones 5-yard run (McGrath kick)	USC 28–6
Q3	4:30	ARIZ	Tate 32-yard run (Pollack kick)	USC 28–13
Q3	1:17	ARIZ	Brown 30-yard pass from Tate (Pollack kick)	USC 28–20
Q4	13:56	USC	Ware 42-yard run (McGrath kick)	USC 35–20
Q4	12:19	ARIZ	Taylor 16-yard pass from Tate (Pollack kick)	USC 35–27
Q4	8:23	ARIZ	Green 3-yard run (Ellison pass from Tate)	Tie 35–35
Q4	5:37	USC	Jones 1-yard run (McGrath kick)	USC 42–35
Q4	3:09	USC	Jones 1-yard run (McGrath kick)	USC 49–35

Statistics	Arizona	USC
First downs	25	30
Plays–yards	74–380	78–642
Rushes–yards	43–234	52–331
Passing yards	146	311
Passing: comp–att–int	14–31–2	20–26–1
Turnovers		
Time of possession	26:05	33:55

Team	Category	Player	Statistics
Arizona	Passing	Khalil Tate	14/31, 146 yards, 2 TD, 2 INT
Arizona	Rushing	Khalil Tate	26 carries, 161 yards, TD
Arizona	Receiving	Shun Brown	8 receptions, 78 yards, TD
USC	Passing	Sam Darnold	20/26, 311 yards, 2 TD, INT
USC	Rushing	Ronald Jones II	27 carries, 194 yards, 3 TD
USC	Receiving	Tyler Vaughns	4 receptions, 59 yards, TD

=== Colorado ===
Team	1	2	3	4	Total
• Trojans	0	20	10	8	38
Buffaloes	0	0	14	10	24

- Date: November 11
- Location: Folsom Field, Boulder, Colorado
- Game start: 2:05 p.m. MST
- Elapsed time: 3:35
- Game attendance: 49,337
- Game weather: Mostly Sunny; 59°F; wind 3 mph NE
- Referee: Terry Leyden
- TV announcers (Fox): Tim Brando, Spencer Tillman and Holly Sonders

Scoring summary
Q2	11:59	USC	Pittman Jr. 10-yard pass from Darnold (McGrath kick)	USC 7–0
Q2	7:51	USC	Burnett 18-yard pass from Darnold (McGrath kick)	USC 14–0
Q2	0:19	USC	Harris 34-yard interception return (kick failed)	USC 20–0
Q3	9:14	USC	Darnold 24-yard run (McGrath kick)	USC 27–0
Q3	8:34	COLO	Winfree 79-yard pass from Montez (Stefanou kick)	USC 27–7
Q3	5:30	COLO	Lindsay 1-yard run (Stefanou kick)	USC 27–14
Q3	2:13	USC	McGrath 26-yard field goal	USC 30–14
Q4	12:42	COLO	Stefanou 39-yard field goal	USC 30–17
Q4	8:56	USC	Jones 22-yard run (Krommenhoek pass from Darnold)	USC 38–17
Q4	7:35	COLO	Winfree 57-yard pass from Montez (Stefanou kick)	USC 38–24

USC clinches Pac-12 South Division title with the win.

Statistics	USC	Colorado
First downs	23	23
Plays–yards	72–522	83–486
Rushes–yards	38–193	34–110
Passing yards	329	376
Passing: comp–att–int	21–34–0	27–49–2
Turnovers		
Time of possession	31:30	28:30

Team	Category	Player	Statistics
USC	Passing	Sam Darnold	21/34, 329 yards, 2 TD
USC	Rushing	Ronald Jones II	25 carries, 142 yards, TD
USC	Receiving	Deontay Burnett	6 receptions, 79 yards, TD
Colorado	Passing	Steven Montez	27/49, 376 yards, 2 TD, 2 INT
Colorado	Rushing	Phillip Lindsay	20 carries, 68 yards, TD
Colorado	Receiving	Juwann Winfree	5 receptions, 163 yards, 2 TD

=== UCLA ===
Team	1	2	3	4	Total
Bruins	7	0	7	9	23
• Trojans	14	0	7	7	28

- Date: November 18
- Location: Los Angeles Memorial Coliseum, Los Angeles, CA
- Game start: 5:14 p.m. PST
- Elapsed time: 3:38
- Game attendance: 82,407
- Game weather: Scattered Clouds; 67°F; wind 5 mph W
- Referee: Kevin Mar
- TV announcers (ABC): Chris Fowler, Kirk Herbstreit and Maria Taylor

Scoring summary
Q1	9:12	USC	Pittman Jr. 72-yard punt return (McGrath kick)	USC 7–0
Q1	6:48	UCLA	Lasley 11-yard pass from Rosen (Molson kick)	Tie 7–7
Q1	4:08	USC	Jones 2-yard run (McGrath kick)	USC 14–7
Q3	5:32	USC	Darnold 1-yard run (McGrath kick)	USC 21–7
Q3	2:57	UCLA	Lasley 9-yard pass from Rosen (Molson kick)	USC 21–14
Q4	10:19	UCLA	Molson 26-yard field goal	USC 21–17
Q4	5:19	USC	Jones 2-yard run (McGrath kick)	USC 28–17
Q4	2:43	UCLA	Lasley 27-yard pass from Rosen (pass failed)	USC 28–23

Statistics	UCLA	USC
First downs	28	24
Plays–yards	83–501	69–417
Rushes–yards	31–80	41–153
Passing yards	421	264
Passing: comp–att–int	32–52–1	17–28–1
Turnovers		
Time of possession	30:18	29:42

Team	Category	Player	Statistics
UCLA	Passing	Josh Rosen	32/52, 421 yards, 3 TD, INT
UCLA	Rushing	Bo Olorunfunmi	13 carries, 56 yards
UCLA	Receiving	Jordan Lasley	10 receptions, 206 yards, 3 TD
USC	Passing	Sam Darnold	17/28, 264 yards, INT
USC	Rushing	Ronald Jones II	28 carries, 122 yards, 2 TD
USC	Receiving	Steven Mitchell	4 receptions, 56 yards

=== Pac-12 Championship Game ===
2017 Pac-12 Football Championship Game

Team	1	2	3	4	Total
Cardinal	0	14	7	7	28
• Trojans	7	10	7	7	31

- Date: December 1
- Location: Levi's Stadium, Santa Clara, California
- Game start: 5:05 p.m. PST
- Elapsed time: 3:33
- Game attendance: 48,031
- Game weather: Partly Cloudy; 55°F; wind 5 mph NE
- Referee: Michael Mothershed
- TV announcers (ESPN): Joe Tessitore, Todd Blackledge and Holly Rowe

Scoring summary
Q1	4:38	USC	Pittman Jr. 7-yard pass from Darnold (McGrath kick)	USC 7–0
Q2	14:45	STAN	Love 9-yard run (Toner kick)	Tie 7–7
Q2	9:46	USC	McGrath 24-yard field goal	USC 10–7
Q2	3:02	USC	Vaughns 19-yard pass from Darnold (McGrath kick)	USC 17–7
Q2	0:34	STAN	Scarlett 1-yard run (Toner kick)	USC 17–14
Q3	4:49	USC	Jones 1-yard run (McGrath kick)	USC 24–14
Q3	2:31	STAN	Smith 11-yard pass from Costello (Toner kick)	USC 24–21
Q4	4:22	USC	Jones 8-yard run (McGrath kick)	USC 31–21
Q4	2:09	STAN	Smith 28-yard pass from Costello (Toner kick)	USC 31–28

Statistics	Stanford	USC
First downs	18	22
Plays–yards	60–343	67–501
Rushes–yards	38–151	43–176
Passing yards	192	325
Passing: comp–att–int	10–22–0	17–24–0
Turnovers		
Time of possession	28:46	31:14

Team	Category	Player	Statistics
Stanford	Passing	K. J. Costello	10/22, 192 yards, 2 TD
Stanford	Rushing	Bryce Love	22 carries, 125 yards, TD
Stanford	Receiving	Kaden Smith	4 receptions, 80 yards, 2 TD
USC	Passing	Sam Darnold	17/24, 325 yards, 2 TD
USC	Rushing	Ronald Jones II	30 carries, 140 yards, 2 TD
USC	Receiving	Michael Pittman Jr.	7 receptions, 146 yards, TD

=== Cotton Bowl ===
Goodyear Cotton Bowl Classic

Team	1	2	3	4	Total
Trojans	0	7	0	0	7
• Buckeyes	7	17	0	0	24

- Date: December 29
- Location: AT&T Stadium, Arlington, Texas
- Game start: 7:40 p.m. CST
- Elapsed time: 3:36
- Game attendance: 67,510
- Game weather: Indoors; 72°F
- Referee: David Smith
- TV announcers (ESPN): Bob Wischusen, Brock Huard and Allison Williams

Scoring summary
Q1	12:25	OSU	Barrett 1-yard run (Nuernberger kick)	OSU 7–0
Q2	14:55	OSU	Nuernberger 26-yard field goal	OSU 10–0
Q2	14:42	OSU	Webb 23-yard interception return (Nuernberger kick)	OSU 17–0
Q2	5:27	OSU	Barrett 28-yard run (Nuernberger kick)	OSU 24–0
Q2	1:29	USC	Jones 1-yard run (McGrath kick)	OSU 24–7

Statistics	USC	Ohio State
First downs	23	13
Plays–yards	81–413	55–277
Rushes–yards	36–57	38–163
Passing yards	356	114
Passing: comp–att–int	26–45–1	11–17–0
Turnovers		
Time of possession	34:56	25:04

Team	Category	Player	Statistics
USC	Passing	Sam Darnold	26/45, 356 yards, INT
USC	Rushing	Ronald Jones II	19 carries, 64 yards, TD
USC	Receiving	Deontay Burnett	12 receptions, 139 yards
Ohio State	Passing	J. T. Barrett	11/17, 114 yards
Ohio State	Rushing	J. T. Barrett	16 carries, 66 yards, 2 TD
Ohio State	Receiving	Marcus Baugh	4 receptions, 40 yards

== Rankings ==
Ranking movements Legend: ██ Increase in ranking ██ Decrease in ranking ( ) = First-place votes
	Week															
Poll	Pre	1	2	3	4	5	6	7	8	9	10	11	12	13	14	Final
AP	4 (2)	6	4	5	5	14	13	11	21	17	15	12	11	11	8	12
Coaches	4	5	4	5	5	15	13	10	21	17	14	10	10	9	8	10
CFP	Not released									17	11	11	11	10	8	Not released

== Statistics ==
=== Team ===
As of 10/21/2017.

Team statistics
	USC	Opponents
Scoring & Efficiency
Points	9I	55
Total Time Possession	0:59:55	I:00:05
Average Time Per Game	29:58	30:02
First Downs	53	40
Rushing	26	20
Passing	27	I3
Penalty	0	7
3rd–Down Conversions	73.9I%	42.3I%
3rd–Down Conversions Att-Comp	I7–23	II–26
4th–Down Conversions	–	0%
4th–Down Conversions Att-Comp	0–0	0–I
Red Zone Scoring	7/8	5/5
Red Zone Touchdowns	7/8	4/5
Penalties – Yards	I7–I84	I3–69
Yards Per Game	92.0	34.5
Offense
Total Offense	II44	699
Total Plays	I4I	I25
Average Plays Per Game	70	62
Average Yards Per Play	8.I	5.6
Average Per Yards Game	572.0	349.5
Rushing Yards	539	433
Rushing Attempts	82	74
Average Yards Per Rush	6.6	5.9
Average Per Yards Game	269.5	2I6.5
Rushing TDs	8	3
Passing Yards	605	266
Att–Comp	44–59	27–5I
Comp %	74.6	52.9
Average Per Pass Att	I0.25	5.22
Average Per Catch	I3.75	9.85
Average Per Game	302.5	I33.0
Passing TDs	4	3
Interceptions	4	I
Defense
INT Returns: # – Yards	I–37	4–52
INT Touchdowns	I	0
Fumbles Recovered: # – Yards	0–0	0–0
Fumble recovery Touchdowns	0	0
QB Sacks: # – Yards	3.0–I5	3.0–I8
Touchdowns	I	0
Safeties	0	0
Special teams
Kickoffs: # – Yards	I5–939	II–628
Average Yards Per Kick	62.2	57.I
Touchbacks	4	5
Onside Kicks: # – Recovered	0-0	0-0
Punts: # – Yards	5–249	9–425
Average Yards Per Punt	49.8	47.22
Touchbacks	0	I
Kickoff Returns: # – Yards	4–75	I0–296
Average Yards Per Return	I8.75	29.6
Kickoff return Touchdowns	0	I
Punt Returns: # – Yards	I–I5	2–9
Average Yards Per Return	I5.0	4.5
Punt return Touchdowns	0	0
Field Goals: # – Attempts	0–0	2–3
Longest Field Goal: Yards	0	43
PAT: # – Attempts	I3–I3	7–7

Non-conference opponents

	1	2	3	4	Total
USC	7	7	7	28	49
All opponents	7	7	7	10	31

Pac-12 opponents

	1	2	3	4	Total
USC	14	14	0	14	42
Pac-12 opponents	7	10	0	7	24

All Opponents

	1	2	3	4	Total
USC	21	21	7	42	91
Opponents	14	17	7	17	55

=== Offense ===
Passing statistics
#	NAME	POS	RAT	CMP	ATT	YDS	Y/A	CMP%	TD	INT	LONG
I4	Sam Darnold	QB	151.0	303	480	4143	8.71	63.1	26	13	56
I9	Matt Fink	QB	106.8	6	9	43	4.78	66.7	0	0	16
I3	Jack Sears	QB	0	0	0	0	0	0	0	0	0
I0	Jalen Greene	WR	0	0	0	0	0	0	0	0	0
–	Team	–	0	0	0	0	0	0	0	0	0
	TOTALS		I69.53	44	59	605	I3.75	74.58	4	4	49
	OPPONENTS		II2.24	27	5I	266	9.85	52.94	3	I	39

Rushing statistics
#	NAME	POS	CAR	YDS	AVG	LONG	TD
25	Ronald Jones II	TB	261	1550	5.9	86	19
7	Stephen Carr	TB	63	363	5.6	52	3
29	Vavae Malepeai	TB	48	259	5.4	26	0
28	Aca'Cedric Ware	TB	46	238	5.2	42	1
26	James Toland IV	TB	4	13	3.3	6	0
47	Reuben Peters	FB	1	0	0.0	0	0
I4	Sam Darnold	QB	64	100	1.6	39	5
23	Velus Jones Jr.	WR	I	−7	−7.0	0	0
80	Deontay Burnett	WR	I	3	3.0	3	0
19	Matt Fink	QB	7	82	11.7	51	1
	TOTALS		507	2534	5.0	86	28
	OPPONENTS		74	433	5.9	75	3

Receiving statistics
#	NAME	POS	REC	YDS	AVG	LONG	TD
80	Deontay Burnett	WR	86	1114	13.44	42	9
4	Steven Mitchell Jr.	WR	8	I33	I6.63	49	4
I0	Jalen Greene	WR	3	33	II.0	I2	0
23	Velus Jones Jr.	WR	I	I6	I6.0	I6	0
2I	Tyler Vaughns	WR	51	690	13.5	42	5
8I	Trevon Sidney	WR	I	7	7.0	7	0
I	Joseph Lewis IV	WR	0	0	0	0	0
6	Michael Pittman Jr.	WR	0	0	0	0	0
9	Randal Grimes	WR	0	0	0	0	0
I5	Keyshawn 'Pie' Young	WR-CB	0	0	0.0	0	0
I7	Josh Imatorbhebhe	WR	0	0	0.0	0	0
82	Tyler Petite	TE	6	59	9.83	I9	0
88	Daniel Imatorbhebhe	TE	I	I2	I2.0	I2	0
83	Josh Falo	TE	0	0	0	0	0
84	Erik Krommenhoek	TE	0	0	0	0	0
86	Cary Angeline	TE	Left Team				
7	Stephen Carr	TB	4	4I	I0.25	I8	0
25	Ronald Jones II	TB	2	29	I4.50	I9	0
28	Aca'Cedric Ware	TB	I	4	4.0	4	0
	TOTALS		44	605	I3.75	49	4
	OPPONENTS		27	266	9.85	39	3

=== Defense ===
Defense statistics
#	NAME	POS	SOLO	AST	TOT	TFL-YDS	SACK-YDS	INT-YDS	BU	QBH	FR-YDS	FF	BLK	SAF	TD
44	Malik Dorton	DT	I	2	3	0.0–0	0.0–0	0–0	–	–	0–0	–	–	–	-
5I	Marlon Tuipulotu	DT	I	I	2	0.0–0	0.0–0	0–0	–	–	0–0	–	–	–	-
53	Kevin Scott	DT	0	0	0	0.0–0	0.0–0	0–0	–	–	0–0	–	–	–	-
78	Jay Tufele	DT	0	0	0	0.0–0	0.0–0	0–0	–	–	0–0	–	–	–	-
89	Christian Rector	DL	2	0	2	0.0–0	0.0–0	0–0	–	–	0–0	–	–	–	-
91	Brandon Pili	DT	0	0	0	0.0–0	0.0–0	0–0	–	–	0–0	–	–	–	-
93	Liam Jimmons	DT	0	0	0	0.0–0	0.0–0	0–0	–	–	0–0	–	–	–	-
94	Rasheem Green	DT	4	8	I2	I.5–2	0.0–0	0–0	3	–	0–0	–	–	–	-
95	Kenny Bigelow Jr.	DT	I	0	I	0.0–0	0.0–0	0–0	–	–	0–0	–	–	–	-
97	Jacob Lichtenstein	DL	0	0	0	0.0–0	0.0–0	0–0	–	–	0–0	–	–	–	-
98	Josh Fatu	DT	3	2	5	2.0–I0	I.0–7	0–0	–	–	0–0	–	–	–	-
3I	Hunter Echols	OLB	0	0	0	0.0–0	0.0–0	0–0	–	–	0–0	–	–	–	-
34	Olajuwon Tucker	OLB	0	0	0	0.0–0	0.0–0	0–0	–	–	0–0	–	–	–	-
42	Uchenna Nwosu	OLB	8	3	II	I.0–5	I.0–5	0–0	6	–	0–0	–	–	–	-
45	Porter Gustin	OLB	6	5	II	I.0–3	I.0–3	0–0	–	–	0–0	–	–	–	-
90	Connor Murphy	OLB	0	0	0	0.0–0	0.0–0	0–0	–	–	0–0	–	–	–	-
99	Oluwole Betiku Jr.	OLB	0	0	0	0.0–0	0.0–0	0–0	–	–	0–0	–	–	–	-
I0	Chris Houston Jr.	ILB	3	6	9	0.0–0	0.0–0	0–0	I	I	0–0	–	–	–	-
I3	Levi Jones	ILB	0	I	I	0.0–0	0.0–0	0–0	–	–	0–0	–	–	–	-
35	Cameron Smith	ILB	7	7	I4	2.5–7	0.0–0	0–0	–	–	0–0	–	–	–	-
4I	Juliano Falaniko	ILB	0	0	0	0.0–0	0.0–0	0–0	–	–	0–0	–	–	–	-
50	Grant Moore	ILB	I	0	I	0.0–0	0.0–0	0–0	–	–	0–0	–	–	–	-
54	Tayler Katoa	ILB	0	0	0	0.0–0	0.0–0	0–0	–	–	0–0	–	–	–	-
56	Jordan Iosefa	ILB	2	2	4	0.0–0	0.0–0	0–0	–	–	0–0	–	–	–	-
8	Iman Marshall	CB	5	4	9	0.0–0	0.0–0	0–0	4	–	0–0	–	–	–	-
9	Greg Johnson	CB	0	0	0	0.0–0	0.0–0	0–0	–	–	0–0	–	–	–	-
I6	Dominic Davis	CB	0	0	0	0.0–0	0.0–0	0–0	–	–	0–0	–	–	–	-
I8	Jalen Jones	CB	0	0	0	0.0–0	0.0–0	0–0	–	–	0–0	–	–	–	-
22	Je'Quari Godfrey	CB	0	0	0	0.0–0	0.0–0	0–0	–	–	0–0	–	–	–	-
23	Jonathan Lockett	CB	0	0	0	0.0–0	0.0–0	0–0	–	–	0–0	–	–	–	-
24	Isaiah Langley	CB	I	0	I	0.0–0	0.0–0	0–0	–	–	0–0	–	–	–	-
25	Jack Jones	CB	8	0	8	0.0–0	0.0–0	0–0	I	–	0–0	–	–	–	-
27	Ajene Harris	CB	5	I	6	I.0–5	0.0–0	0–0	–	–	0–0	–	–	–	-
2	Bubba Bolden	S	0	0	0	0.0–0	0.0–0	0–0	–	–	0–0	–	–	–	-
4	Chris Hawkins	S	5	6	II	0.0–0	0.0–0	0–0	–	–	0–0	–	–	–	-
6	Isaiah Pola-Mao	S	0	0	0	0.0–0	0.0–0	0–0	–	–	0–0	–	–	–	-
7	Marvel Tell	S	4	7	II	0.0–0	0.0–0	I–37	I	–	0–0	–	–	–	I
I4	Ykili Ross	S	I	0	I	0.0–0	0.0–0	0–0	–	–	0–0	–	–	–	-
2I	Jamel Cook	S	0	0	0	0.0–0	0.0–0	0–0	–	–	0–0	–	–	–	-
28	C.J. Pollard	S	0	I	I	0.0–0	0.0–0	0–0	–	–	0–0	–	–	–	-
37	Matt Lopes	S	2	I	3	0.0–0	0.0–0	0–0	–	–	0–0	–	–	–	-
–	Team	–	0	0	0	0.0–0	0.0–0	0–0	–	–	0–0	–	–	–	-
7	Stephen Carr	TB	I	0	I	0.0–0	0.0–0	0–0	–	–	0–0	–	–	–	-
26	James Toland IV	TB	I	0	I	0.0–0	0.0–0	0–0	–	–	0–0	–	–	–	-
29	Vavae Malepeai	TB	0	I	I	0.0–0	0.0–0	0–0	–	–	0–0	–	–	–	-
I	Joseph Lewis IV	WR	I	0	I	0.0–0	0.0–0	0–0	–	–	0–0	–	–	–	-
2I	Tyler Vaughns	WR	I	0	I	0.0–0	0.0–0	0–0	–	–	0–0	–	–	–	-
	TOTAL		74	58	I32	9.0–32	3.0–I5	I–37	I6	I	0–0	0	0	0	I
	OPPONENTS		83	58	I4I	5.0–3I	3.0–I8	4–52	3	0	0–0	0	0	0	0

Key: POS: Position, SOLO: Solo Tackles, AST: Assisted Tackles, TOT: Total Tackles, TFL: Tackles-for-loss, SACK: Quarterback Sacks, INT: Interceptions, BU: Passes Broken Up, PD: Passes Defended, QBH: Quarterback Hits, FR: Fumbles Recovered, FF: Forced Fumbles, BLK: Kicks or Punts Blocked, SAF: Safeties, TD : Touchdown

=== Special teams ===
Kicking statistics
#	NAME	POS	XPM	XPA	XP%	FGM	FGA	FG%	1–19	20–29	30–39	40–49	50+	LNG	PTS
40	Chase McGrath	PK	I3	I3	I00%	0	0	0%	0/0	0/0	0/0	0/0	0/0	0	I3
49	Michael Brown	PK	0	0	0%	0	0	0%	0/0	0/0	0/0	0/0	0/0	0	0
	TOTALS		I3	I3	I00%	0	0	0.0	0/0	0/0	0/0	0/0	0/0	0	I3
	OPPONENTS		7	7	I00%	2	3	66.4%	0/0	0/0	I/2	I/I	0/0	43	I3

Kickoff statistics
#	NAME	POS	KICKS	YDS	AVG	TB	OB
49	Michael Brown	PK	9	582	64.7	3	I
40	Chase McGrath	PK	6	357	59.5	I	0
	TOTALS		I5	939	62.6	4	I
	OPPONENTS		II	628	57.I	5	0

Punting statistics
#	NAME	POS	PUNTS	YDS	AVG	LONG	TB	I–20	50+	BLK
38	Reid Budrovich	P	5	249	49.8	59	0	2	2	0
36	Chris Tilbey	P	0	0	0.0	0	0	0	0	0
	TOTALS		5	249	49.8	59	0	2	2	0
	OPPONENTS		9	425	47.22	59	I	6	4	0

Kick return statistics
#	NAME	POS	RTNS	YDS	AVG	TD	LNG
23	Velus Jones Jr.	WR	2	6I	30.5	0	32
25	Jack Jones	CB	2	I4	7.0	0	I4
	TOTALS		4	75	I8.75	0	32
	OPPONENTS		I0	296	29.6	I	I00

Punt return statistics
#	NAME	POS	RTNS	YDS	AVG	TD	LONG
27	Ajene Harris	CB	I	I5	I5.0	0	I5
	TOTALS		I	I5	I5.0	0	I5
	OPPONENTS		2	9	4.5	0	9

== Awards and honors ==
=== Coaches ===
Clay Helton - Head coach

- Associated Press PAC-I2 Coach of the Year : Winner
- Dodd Trophy (Division I head coach whose team excels on the field, in the classroom and in the community) : Watchlist

Tee Martin - Offensive coordinator/wide receivers coach

- Broyles Award (Award given to honor the best assistant coach in college football) : Semifinalist

=== Offense ===
Sam Darnold - QB - (redshirt) Sophomore

- Maxwell Award (College football player of the year) : Semifinalist
- Davey O'Brien Award (best of all NCAA quarterbacks) : Semifinalist
- Walter Camp Award (Player of the Year in college football) : Semifinalist

Ronald Jones II - TB - Junior

- Doak Walker Award (The nation's top college football running back) : Semifinalist

Vavae Malepeai - TB - (redshirt) Freshman

- Polynesian College Football Player of the Year : Watchlist

Deontay Burnett - WR - Junior

- Biletnikoff Award (The nation's top college football wide receiver) : Semifinalist

Daniel Imatorbhebhe - TE - (redshirt) Sophomore

- John Mackey Award (College football's most outstanding tight end) : Watchlist

Toa Lobendahn - OT/C - Senior

- Polynesian College Football Player of the Year : Watchlist

Viane Talamaivao - OG - Senior

- Polynesian College Football Player of the Year : Watchlist

Nico Falah - C - (redshirt) Senior

- Wuerffel Trophy (college football player "who best combines exemplary community service with athletic and academic achievement") : Watchlist

=== Defense ===
Rasheem Green - DT - Junior

- Bronko Nagurski Trophy (best defensive player in NCAA college football) : Watchlist
- Outland Trophy (Best interior lineman in college football) : Watchlist

Porter Gustin - LB - Junior

- Bednarik Award (College defensive player of the year) : Watchlist
- Butkus Award (top linebacker in college football) : Watchlist

Cameron Smith - LB - Junior

- Bronko Nagurski Trophy (best defensive player in NCAA college football) : Watchlist
- Bednarik Award (College defensive player of the year) : Watchlist
- Butkus Award (top linebacker in college football) : Semifinalist

Uchenna Nwosu - LB - Senior

- Butkus Award (top linebacker in college football) : Watchlist

Iman Marshall - CB - Junior

- Bronko Nagurski Trophy (best defensive player in NCAA college football) : Watchlist
- Bednarik Award (College defensive player of the year) : Watchlist
- Jim Thorpe Award (top defensive back in college football) : Watchlist

=== Special Team ===
Chris Tilbey - P - (redshirt) Junior

- Ray Guy Award (College football's top punter) : Watchlist

Jake Olson - LS - (redshirt) Junior

- Jason Witten Collegiate Man Of The Year Award (leadership by exhibiting exceptional courage, integrity and sportsmanship both on and off the field) : Semifinalist. During the season, Olson became the first blind Division I player.

=== AP Pre-Season All-Americans ===
- First team

Sam Darnold - QB - (redshirt) Freshman

- Second team

Cameron Smith - ILB - Sophomore
Iman Marshall - CB - Sophomore

=== PAC-12 All-Conference Team ===
- First team

Sam Darnold - QB - (redshirt) Sophomore
Ronald Jones II - TB - Junior
Rasheem Green - DT - Junior
Uchenna Nwosu - OLB - Senior
Cameron Smith - ILB - Junior
Marvell Tell - S - Junior
Michael Pittman Jr. - ST - Sophomore

- Second team

Deontay Burnett - WR - Junior
Toa Lobendahn - OT - Senior
Christian Rector - DT - (redshirt) Sophomore
Matt Lopes - ST - Senior

- Honorable mention

Stephen Carr - TB - Freshman
Steven Mitchell - WR - (redshirt) Senior
Tyler Vaughns - WR - (redshirt) Freshman
Tyler Petite - TE - Junior
Chris Brown - OG - (redshirt) Junior
Josh Fatu - DT - Senior
Brandon Pili - DT - Freshman
Iman Marshall - CB - Junior
Chris Hawkins - S - (redshirt) Senior

=== Sporting News 2017 college football preseason All-Americans ===
- First team

Sam Darnold - QB - (redshirt) Sophomore
Cameron Smith - LB - Junior

== Notes ==
- January 2, 2017 – Rose Bowl Final Score: USC Topples Penn State.
- January 2, 2017 – How USC Won the Rose Bowl Over Penn State.
- January 2, 2017 – Past Trojans Hyped Over Rose Bowl Win.
- January 2, 2017 – Trojans Celebrate Rose Bowl.
- January 4, 2017 – LB Cameron Smith Suspended for 1st Half of 2017 Opener.
- January 4, 2017 – USC's Sam Darnold Wins Archie Griffin Award As 2016 CFB MVP.
- January 5, 2017 – OG Jordan Simmons Denied 6th Year Of Eligibility.
- January 6, 2017 – Damien Mama Declares for the 2017 NFL Draft, Leaving USC Early.
- January 7, 2017 – 4-star 2018 WR Allen commits to USC.
- January 7, 2017 – Bubba Bolden Re-Commits To USC Football Recruiting Class of 2017.
- January 7, 2017 – JuJu Smith-Schuster Declares For 2017 NFL Draft, Leaving USC Football Early.
- January 9, 2017 – Matt Leinart Named To 2017 College Football Hall of Fame Class.
- January 9, 2017 – Clay Helton Named FWAA First Year Coach of Year.
- January 9, 2017 – USC Football Has Third-Best Odds To Win 2017 National Championship.
- January 9, 2017 – USC Football Ranked High in ESPN's Way Too Early Top 25.
- January 10, 2017 – USC Football Ranks in Final AP Top 5 For First Time Since 2008.
- January 10, 2017 – 3-Star WR Marlon Williams De-Commits.
- January 11, 2017 – Trojans Welcome 2017 Early Enrollees.
- January 15, 2017 – Je’Quari Godfrey Commits To 2017 USC Football Recruiting Class.
- January 16, 2017 – Adoree’ Jackson Declares Early For 2017 NFL Draft, Leaving USC Football.
- January 16, 2017 – Jalen McKenzie Commits to 2017 USC Recruiting Class.
- January 18, 2017 – 2017 USC Football Schedule Released: No Regular Season Bye Week For Trojans.
- January 18, 2017 – C.J. Miller De-Commits From 2017 Class.
- January 20, 2017 – Juwan Burgess flips from USC to Indiana.
- January 22, 2017 – Brandon Pili commits to the 2017 USC Football Recruiting Class.
- January 23, 2017 – Marlon Tuipulotu flips from Washington to USC.
- January 27, 2017 – Isaiah Pola-Mao commits to 2017 USC football recruiting class.
- January 29, 2017 – Khaliel Rodgers to transfer to Iowa State.
- January 30, 2017 – USC Signing Day 2017: announcement schedule and TV times.
- January 30, 2017 – DT Marlon Tuipulotu completes early enrollment.
- February 1, 2017 – Levi Jones selects USC on ESPNU's Signing Day Special.
- February 1, 2017 – Austin Jackson selects USC Football on Signing Day.
- February 1, 2017 – Jay Tufele selects USC Football over Utah on Signing Day.
- February 1, 2017 – Josh Falo selects USC Football on Signing Day 2017.
- February 1, 2017 – Joseph Lewis selects USC Football over Nebraska On Signing Day.
- February 1, 2017 – Greg Johnson selects USC Football On Signing Day.
- February 4, 2017 – Terrance Lang signs with Colorado.
- February 7, 2017 – Running backs coach Tommie Robinson Leaves USC Football to Join LSU.
- February 16, 2017 – USC Football sending eight Trojans to the 2017 NFL Combine.
- February 19, 2017 – Palaie Gaoteote commits to USC's 2018 Recruiting Class.
- February 20, 2017 – USC Football: Sam Darnold oddsmaker's favorite to win Heisman.
- February 22, 2017 – Indiana RB coach Deland McCullough reportedly targeted By USC Football.
- February 22, 2017 – USC commit Matt Corral transferring to Long Beach Poly.
- February 22, 2017 – Deland McCullough to be hired by USC as running backs coach.
- February 24, 2017 – Manuel Allen decommits from 2018 USC recruiting class.
- March 3, 2017 – New running backs coach Deland McCullough.
- March 6, 2017 – Noah Jefferson to transfer to Arizona.
- March 11, 2017 – Kicker Chase McGrath Commits For 2017.
- April 2, 2017 – Tayler Katoa to Miss 2017 USC Football Season With Torn ACL.
- April 3, 2017 – De’Gabriel Floyd Commits to USC Football Recruiting Class of 2019.
- April 23, 2017 – Tuli Letuligasenoa Commits to USC Football's 2018 Recruiting Class.
- April 27, 2017 – Adoree’ Jackson Picked By Tennessee Titans In First Round of 2017 NFL Draft.
- April 28, 2017 – JuJu Smith-Schuster Picked By Pittsburgh Steelers In Second Round of 2017 NFL Draft.
- April 29, 2017 – Zach Banner Picked By Indianapolis Colts In 4th Round of 2017 NFL Draft.
- April 29, 2017 – Leon McQuay III Picked By Kansas City Chiefs In 6th Round of 2017 NFL Draft.
- April 29, 2017 – USC Becomes First School to Have 500 All-Time NFL Draft Picks.
- April 29, 2017 – Stevie Tu’ikolovatu Picked By Tampa Bay Buccaneers In 7th Round of 2017 NFL Draft.
- April 30, 2017 – Darreus Rogers Signs With Seattle Seahawks As Undrafted Free Agent.
- April 30, 2017 – Isaac Whitney Signs With Oakland Raiders as Undrafted Free Agent.
- April 30, 2017 – Chad Wheeler Signs With New York Giants as Undrafted Free Agent.
- April 30, 2017 – Jordan Simmons Signs With Oakland Raiders As Undrafted Free Agent.
- April 30, 2017 – Damien Mama Signs With KC Chiefs as Undrafted Free Agent.
- April 30, 2017 – Justin Davis Signs With LA Rams as Undrafted Free Agent.
- April 30, 2017 – Quinton Powell Signs With New Orleans Saints as Undrafted Free Agent.
- April 30, 2017 – De’Quan Hampton Signs With Detroit Lions As Undrafted Free Agent.
- April 30, 2017 – Taylor McNamara Signs With Cleveland Browns as Undrafted Free Agent.
- April 30, 2017 – Former ASU DT Dillon Faamatau Commits To USC Football.
- April 30, 2017 – Sam Darnold Is Consensus No. 1 Pick in 2018 NFL Mock Drafts.
- June 6, 2017 – Dillon Faamatau flips to Oklahoma.
