= 2017 Cotton Bowl Classic (December) =

2017 Goodyear Cotton Bowl Classic
- CFP New Year’s Six; 82nd Cotton Bowl Classic
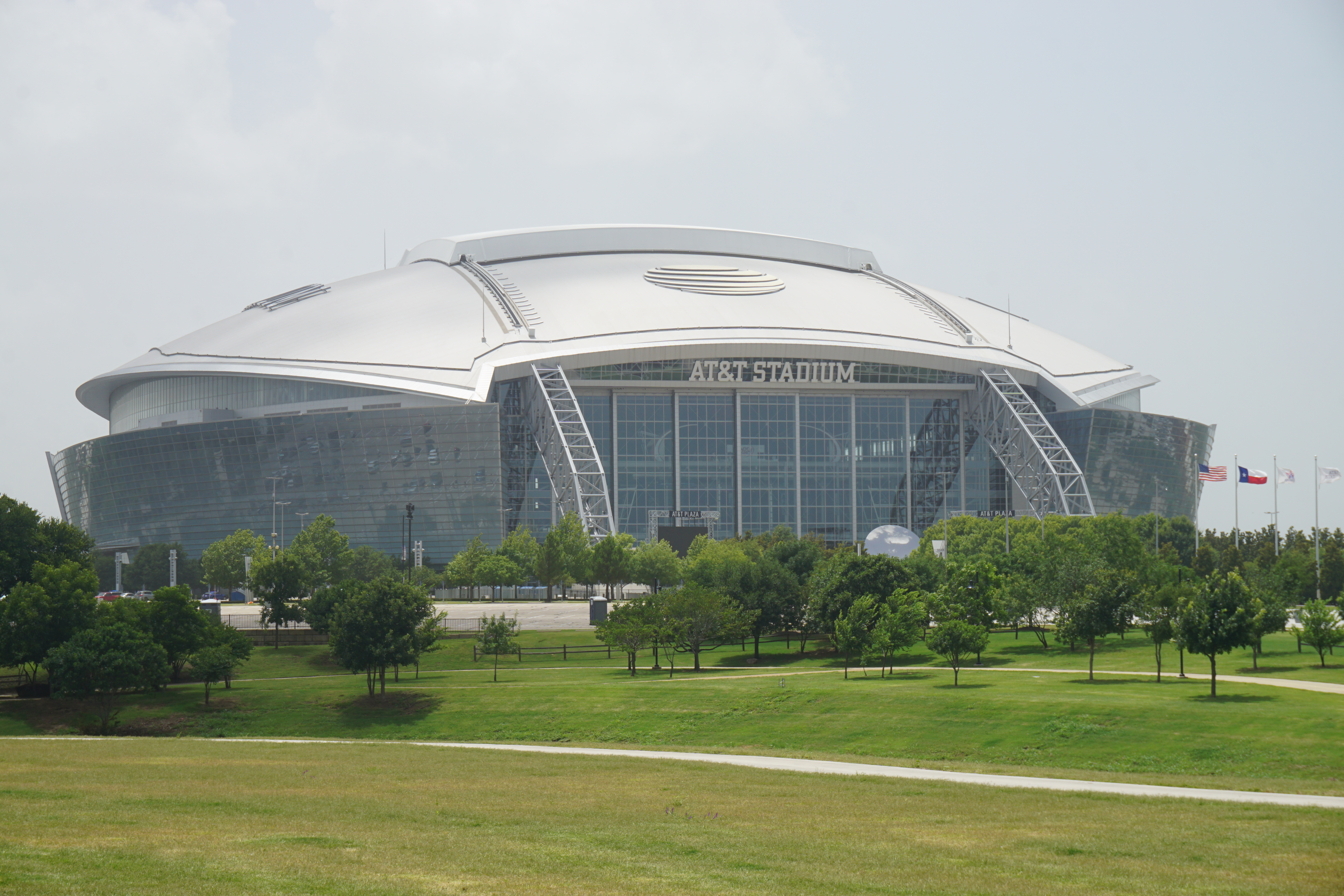
- AT&T Stadium in Arlington, Texas, hosted the Cotton Bowl Classic.
USC Trojans	Ohio State Buckeyes
(11–2)	(11–2)
Pac-12	Big Ten
7	24
Head coach: Clay Helton	Head coach: Urban Meyer
AP / Coaches / CFP; 8 / 7 / 8	AP / Coaches / CFP; 5 / 5 / 5
	1	2	3	4	Total
USC	0	7	0	0	7
Ohio State	7	17	0	0	24
- Date: December 29, 2017
- Season: 2017
- Stadium: AT&T Stadium
- Location: Arlington, Texas
- MVP: Offense: QB J. T. Barrett Defense: S Damon Webb
- Favorite: Ohio State by 10
- Referee: David Smith (SEC)
- Attendance: 67,510

United States TV coverage
- Network: ESPN & ESPN Radio
- Announcers: Bob Wischusen, Brock Huard, and Allison Williams (ESPN); Brad Sham, Rod Gilmore, Quint Kessenich (ESPN Radio)
- Nielsen ratings: 5.82

The 2017 Cotton Bowl Classic was a college football bowl game played on December 29, 2017, at AT&T Stadium in Arlington, Texas. It featured the Ohio State Buckeyes from the Big Ten Conference and the USC Trojans from the Pac-12 Conference. The 82nd Cotton Bowl Classic was one of the 2017–18 bowl games that concluded the 2017 FBS football season.

The game was broadcast on ESPN, ESPN Deportes, ESPN Radio and XM Satellite Radio. It was sponsored by the Goodyear Tire and Rubber Company and was officially known as the Goodyear Cotton Bowl Classic.

== Teams ==
The Cotton Bowl was played by Pac-12 Conference champion USC Trojans and Big Ten Conference champion Ohio State Buckeyes. These teams were chosen by the CFP Selection Committee. Traditionally, the Pac-12 and Big Ten champions meet in the Rose Bowl, however in the 2017 season, that game will be used for one of the two College Football Playoff semifinal games. Of note is that this year's Rose Bowl features SEC champion Georgia and Big 12 champion Oklahoma, a matchup which traditionally occurs in the Sugar Bowl, which is being used as the other CFP semifinal game for this year.

Prior to kickoff, the Trojans led the all-time series 13-9-1; the most recent game was on September 12, 2009, where the Trojans defeated the Buckeyes by a score of 18–15, scoring with 1:05 remaining in the game to go ahead to stay. USC had won the last 7 games in the series, with Ohio State's last win coming in the 1974 Rose Bowl.

This is the eighth time that the schools met in a bowl game. The previous seven bowl meetings were all in the Rose Bowl, most recently in 1985—a game the Trojans won, 20–17.

The Buckeyes defeated the Trojans 24–7. With the victory, the all-time series between the schools now stands at 13-10-1 in favor of USC.

== Game summary ==
=== Scoring summary ===
Scoring summary

Quarter	Time	Drive			Team	Scoring information	Score	
Quarter	Time	Plays	Yards	TOP	Team	Scoring information	USC	OSU
1	12:25	5	19	1:12	OSU	J. T. Barrett 1-yard touchdown run, Sean Nuernberger kick good	0	7
2	14:55	12	83	5:06	OSU	26-yard field goal by Sean Nuernberger	0	10
2	14:42				OSU	Interception returned 23 yards for touchdown by Damon Webb, Sean Nuernberger kick good	0	17
2	5:27	2	59	0:45	OSU	J. T. Barrett 28-yard touchdown run, Sean Nuernberger kick good	0	24
2	1:59	3	15	0:56	USC	Ronald Jones 1-yard touchdown run, Chase McGrath kick good	7	24
"TOP" = time of possession. For other American football terms, see Glossary of American football.							7	24

=== Statistics ===
	1	2	3	4	Total
No. 8 Trojans	0	7	0	0	7
No. 5 Buckeyes	7	17	0	0	24

Statistics	USC	OSU
First downs	23	13
Plays–yards	81–413	55–277
Rushes–yards	36–57	38–163
Passing yards	356	114
Passing: Comp–Att–Int	26–45–1	11–17–0
Time of possession	34:56	25:04

Team	Category	Player	Statistics
USC	Passing	Sam Darnold	26/45, 356 yds, 1 INT
USC	Rushing	Ronald Jones	19 car, 64 yds, 1 TD
USC	Receiving	Deontay Burnett	12 rec, 139 yds
OSU	Passing	J. T. Barrett	11/17, 114 yds
OSU	Rushing	J. T. Barrett	16 car, 66 yds, 2 TD
OSU	Receiving	Marcus Baugh	4 rec, 40 yds
