= Jay Tufele =

American football player (born 1999)

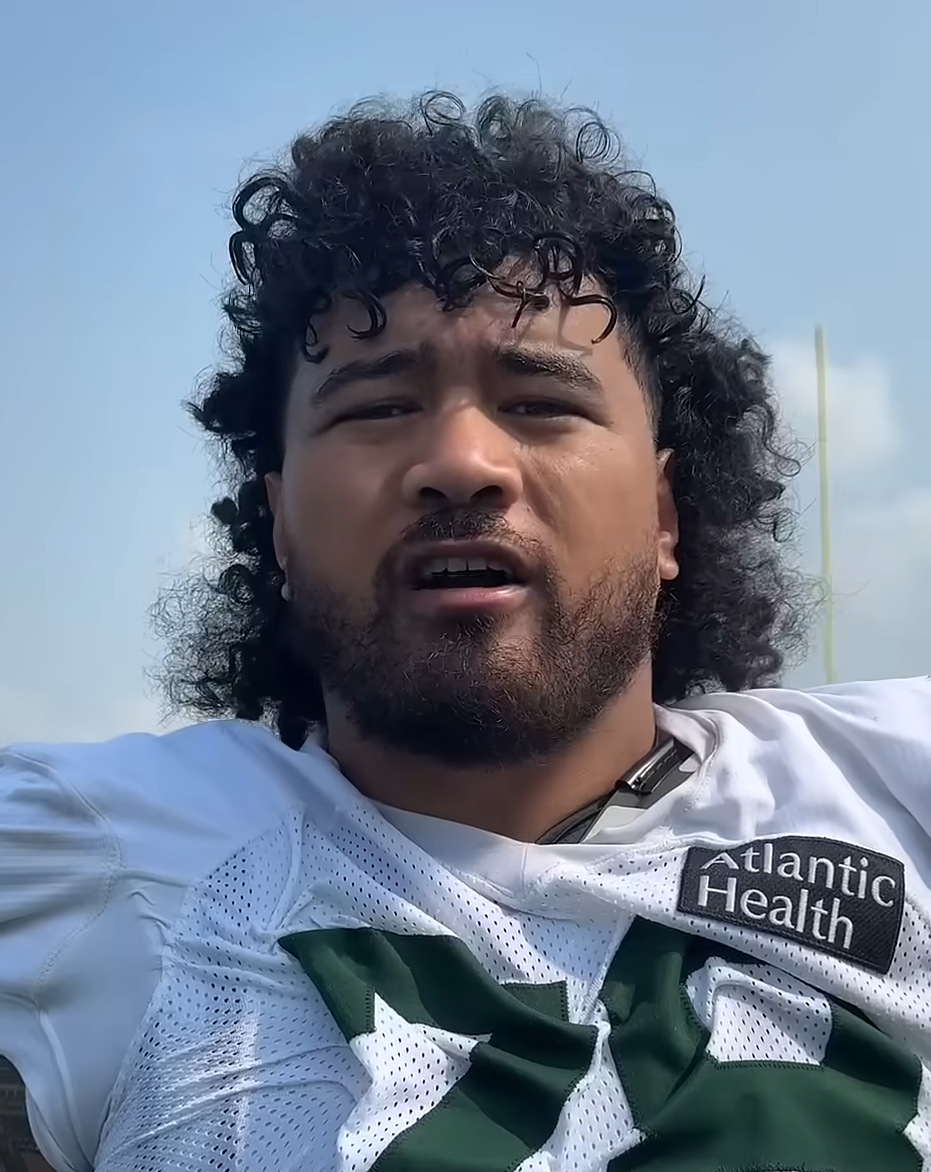
- Tufele with the New York Jets in 2025

Profile
- Position: Defensive tackle

Personal information
- Born: July 25, 1999 (age 27); Salt Lake City, Utah, U.S.
- Listed height: 6 ft 2 in (1.88 m)
- Listed weight: 305 lb (138 kg)

Career information
- High school: Bingham (South Jordan, Utah)
- College: USC (2017–2020)
- NFL draft: 2021: 4th round, 106th overall pick

Career history
- Jacksonville Jaguars (2021); Cincinnati Bengals (2022–2024); New York Jets (2025); Detroit Lions (2026)*
- * Offseason or practice squad member only

Awards and highlights
- First-team All-Pac-12 (2019); Second-team All-Pac-12 (2018); Freshman All-American (2018)

Career NFL statistics as of 2025
- Total tackles: 56
- Sacks: 0.5
- Pass deflections: 1
- Stats at Pro Football Reference

Jayleen Pea Tufele (born July 25, 1999) is an American professional football defensive tackle. He played college football for the USC Trojans.

== Early life ==
Tufele attended Bingham High School in South Jordan, Utah. As a sophomore in 2014, Tufele started on the varsity team, making 63 tackles and six sacks, which earned him a spot on the MaxPreps Sophomore All-American first-team. As a junior, Tufele anchored a defense that tallied eight shutouts, making 57 tackles and 10.5 sacks on his way to being named the Salt Lake Tribune’s high school football MVP. Tufele did not play his senior year due to a torn ligament in his foot.

Tufele also played rugby in high school.

Tufele was a consensus top-40 recruit and received scholarship offers from over 20 schools, including Michigan, Notre Dame, Ohio State, Utah, and USC. Tufele announced his commitment to USC on National Signing Day and enrolled in June.

College recruiting
Name	Hometown	School	Height	Weight	Commit date
Jay Tufele; DL	South Jordan, Utah	Bingham High School	6 ft 3 in (1.91 m)	297 lb (135 kg)	Feb 1, 2017
Jay Tufele; DL	Recruit ratings: Rivals: 247Sports:				
Overall recruit ranking: Rivals: 4 (DL), 1 (UT) 247Sports: 3 (DL), 1 (UT)
Note: In many cases, Scout, Rivals, 247Sports, On3, and ESPN may conflict in their listings of height and weight.; In these cases, the average was taken. ESPN grades are on a 100-point scale.; Sources: "2017 Team Ranking". Rivals.com.

== College career ==
Tufele redshirted the 2017 season. As a redshirt freshman in 2018, Tufele appeared in 12 games, starting five times. He made 23 tackles, 4.5 tackles for loss, and three sacks. In a week eight game against Utah, Tufele returned a fumble 48 yards for a touchdown, making him a nominee for the 2018 Piesman Trophy, which is awarded for the most impressive play made by a lineman. After the season, he was named to the All-Pac-12 second team, won USC’s Defensive Lineman of the Year award, and was a Pac-12 Freshman Defensive Player of the Year honorable mention.

As a redshirt sophomore in 2019, Tufele started all 13 games and made 41 tackles, 6.5 tackles for loss, and 4.5 sacks, which was the second-most on the team. After the season, Tufele was named to the All-Pac-12 first team, an honorable mention on Phil Steele’s All-American team, and repeated as the Defensive Lineman of the Year for USC.

=== Statistics ===
Year	GP	Tackles	For Loss	Sacks	Int	FF
2018	12	23	4.5	3	0	0
2019	13	42	6.5	4.5	0	0
Total	25	65	11	7.5	0	0

== Professional career ==
Pre-draft measurables
Height	Weight	Arm length	Hand span	Wingspan	40-yard dash	10-yard split	20-yard split	20-yard shuttle	Three-cone drill	Vertical jump	Broad jump	Bench press
6 ft 2 1/8 in (1.88 m)	305 lb (138 kg)	32 1/2 in (0.83 m)	9 3/8 in (0.24 m)	6 ft 7 3/8 in (2.02 m)	5.02 s	1.75 s	2.94 s	4.90 s	7.81 s	30.0 in (0.76 m)	8 ft 9 in (2.67 m)	30 reps
All values from Pro Day

=== Jacksonville Jaguars ===
Tufele was selected by the Jacksonville Jaguars in the fourth round, 106th overall, of the 2021 NFL draft. On May 21, 2021, he signed his four-year rookie contract with Jacksonville. He was placed on injured reserve on October 29. Tufele was activated on December 4.

On August 30, 2022, Tufele was waived by the Jaguars.

=== Cincinnati Bengals ===
On August 31, 2022, Tufele was claimed off waivers by the Cincinnati Bengals. He was listed as the third nose tackle on the depth chart, behind D. J. Reader and Josh Tupou for the 2022 and 2023 seasons.

=== New York Jets ===
On March 17, 2025, Tufele signed with the New York Jets. He played in 12 games (including two starts) for the Jets, recording 12 tackles as a backup interior lineman. On December 26, Tufele was placed on season-ending injured reserve due to a foot injury suffered in Week 16 against the New Orleans Saints.

=== Detroit Lions ===
On April 29, 2026, Tufele signed with the Detroit Lions. On July 28, he was released by the Lions.

== Personal life ==
Tufele is of Polynesian descent. His father Line also played football. Tufele has two sisters and two younger brothers.
