= Brandon Pili =

American football player (born 1999)

No. 95 – Seattle Seahawks
- Position: Nose tackle
- Roster status: Active

Personal information
- Born: April 2, 1999 (age 27); Anchorage, Alaska, U.S.
- Listed height: 6 ft 3 in (1.91 m)
- Listed weight: 334 lb (151 kg)

Career information
- High school: Dimond (Anchorage); Westview (Portland, Oregon)
- College: USC (2017–2022)
- NFL draft: 2023: undrafted

Career history
- Miami Dolphins (2023–2024); Seattle Seahawks (2024–present)

Awards and highlights
- Super Bowl champion (LX)

Career NFL statistics as of 2025
- Total tackles: 16
- Stats at Pro Football Reference

Brandon Pili (born April 2, 1999) is an American professional football nose tackle for the Seattle Seahawks of the National Football League (NFL). He played college football for the USC Trojans and was signed by the Miami Dolphins as an undrafted free agent in 2023.

== Early life and education ==
Pili was born on April 2, 1999, the eldest of seven children. His father had moved to Alaska from Hawaii in 1990 and his mother grew up in Utqiagvik, Alaska, the northernmost settlement in the United States. Pili is a shareholder of Ukpeaġvik Iñupiat Corporation. He lived the first few years of his life in Utqiagvik, later moving to Anchorage.

He played several sports growing up and attended Dimond High School in Anchorage, where he played football until the first game of his senior season. Pili transferred to Westview High School in Portland, Oregon, to finish his high school career. He had received little attention from college football teams while at Dimond but began receiving a significant amount of offers after transferring to Westview; he ultimately committed to play for the USC Trojans.

== College career ==
Pili, a defensive tackle, weighed 345 pounds in his freshman year at USC and saw significant playing time that year, appearing in nine games, two as a starter, and posting 14 tackles as well as a blocked field goal. The following year, he played in all 12 games and had two starts, posting 12 tackles and a sack. In 2019, he had 18 tackles, three pass breakups and a fumble forced in 13 games played. Pili posted five tackles in four games played during the COVID-19-shortened 2020 season.

Pili was expected to see significant action in the 2021 season, but tore his achilles tendon prior to the start of the season and missed the entire year. In his final year, 2022, he brought his weight down to 315 pounds, played 14 games and had a career-high 25 tackles in addition to one sack and a pass breakup. He finished his collegiate career with 74 tackles, 10 of which were for a loss, and four sacks in 52 games played.

== Professional career ==
Pre-draft measurables
Height	Weight	Arm length	Hand span	Wingspan	40-yard dash	10-yard split	20-yard split	20-yard shuttle	Three-cone drill	Vertical jump	Broad jump	Bench press
6 ft 2 7/8 in (1.90 m)	316 lb (143 kg)	32 1/4 in (0.82 m)	10 1/2 in (0.27 m)	6 ft 8 3/4 in (2.05 m)	5.36 s	1.83 s	3.09 s	4.95 s	7.75 s	29.0 in (0.74 m)	8 ft 11 in (2.72 m)	24 reps
All values from Pro Day

=== Miami Dolphins ===
After going unselected in the 2023 NFL draft, Pili was signed by the Miami Dolphins as an undrafted free agent. He made the team's final roster, becoming the first Alaskan to be on an NFL roster since 2014. Pili was waived on November 4 and re-signed to the practice squad three days later.

Pili signed a reserve/future contract with Miami on January 15, 2024. On November 9, Pili was waived by the Dolphins.

=== Seattle Seahawks ===
On November 11, 2024, Pili was claimed off waivers by the Seattle Seahawks, but was waived five days later and re-signed to the practice squad.

On August 26, 2025, Pili was waived by the Seahawks as part of final roster cuts and re-signed to the practice squad the next day On October 9, Pili was signed to the active roster.

On March 16, 2026, Pili re-signed with the team on a one-year, $2 million contract.

== Personal life ==
Pili's younger sister, Alissa, plays basketball for the Geelong Venom of the WNBL.
