= Rasheem Green =

American football player (born 1997)

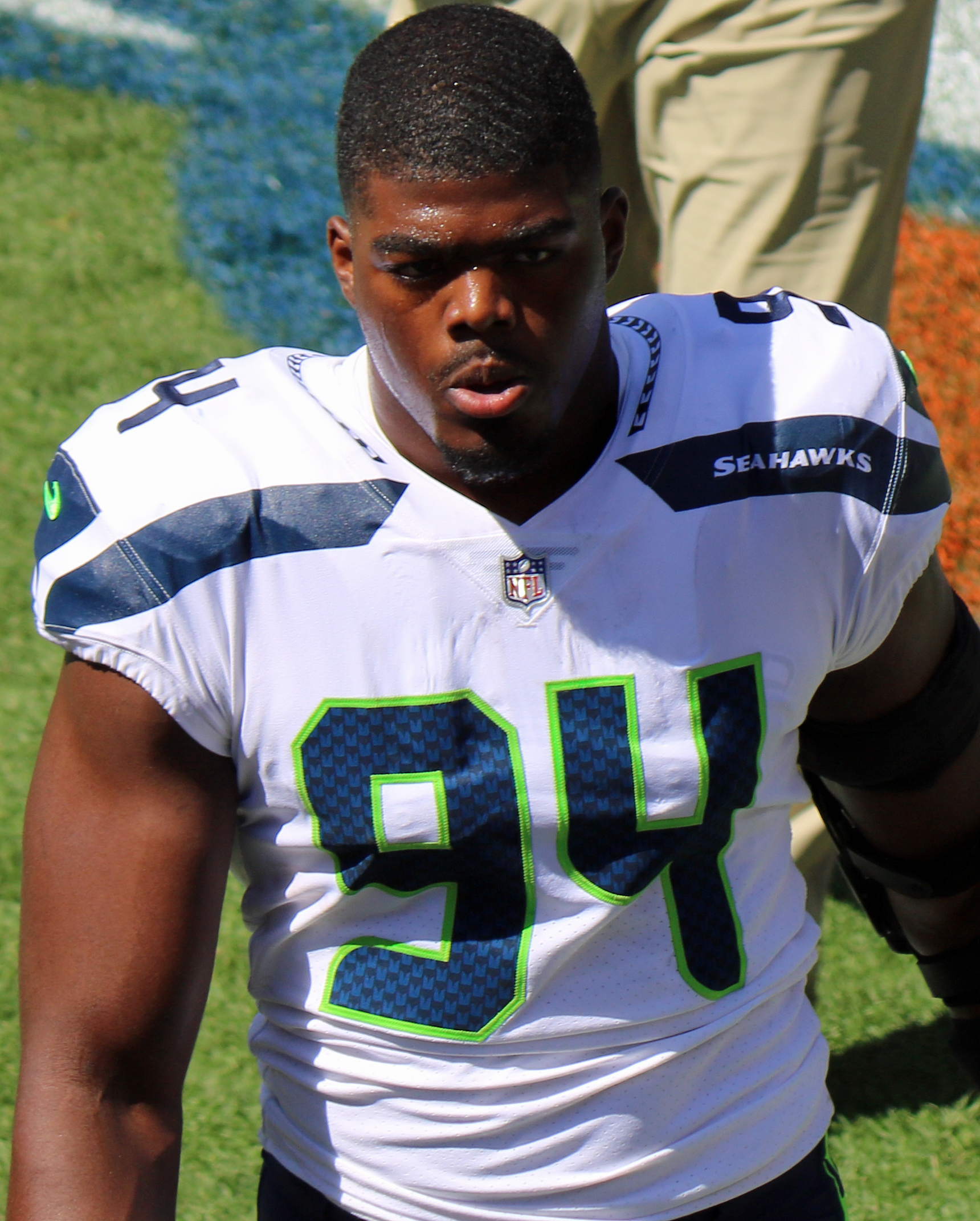
- Green with the Seattle Seahawks in 2018

Profile
- Position: Defensive end

Personal information
- Born: May 15, 1997 (age 29); Los Angeles, California, U.S.
- Listed height: 6 ft 4 in (1.93 m)
- Listed weight: 279 lb (127 kg)

Career information
- High school: Junípero Serra (Gardena, California)
- College: USC (2015–2017)
- NFL draft: 2018: 3rd round, 79th overall pick

Career history
- Seattle Seahawks (2018–2021); Houston Texans (2022); Chicago Bears (2023); Jacksonville Jaguars (2024)*
- * Offseason or practice squad member only

Awards and highlights
- First-team All-Pac-12 (2017)

Career NFL statistics as of 2023
- Total tackles: 151
- Sacks: 19.0
- Forced fumbles: 3
- Fumble recoveries: 2
- Pass deflections: 8
- Stats at Pro Football Reference

Rasheem Green (born May 15, 1997) is an American former professional football player who was a defensive end in the National Football League (NFL). He played college football for the USC Trojans and was selected by the Seattle Seahawks in the third round of the 2018 NFL draft. Green has also played for the Houston Texans and Chicago Bears.

== Early life ==
Green attended Junípero Serra High School in Gardena, California. He committed to the University of Southern California (USC) to play college football.

== College career ==
Green played at USC from 2015 to 2017. As a true freshman, Green played in every game, posting 19 stops, one for loss and a fumble recovery for a touchdown against UCLA. He started 12 of 13 games for USC in 2016, making 55 tackles, 6.5 for losses, and a team-best six sacks. The honorable mention All-Pac-12 selection also blocked two field goals (tied for fifth nationally) and two forced fumbles. Green started all 14 games at defensive tackle in 2017, garnering first-team All-Pac-12 honors after leading his team with 12.5 tackles for loss and 10 sacks and being credited with 43 total tackles and 4 pass breakups. After his junior season in 2017, he decided to forgo his senior year and enter the 2018 NFL draft. During his collegiate career, he had 115 tackles and 16.5 sacks. He led the Trojans in sacks in each of his last two seasons.

== Professional career ==
=== Pre-draft ===
On January 13, 2018, Green announced his decision to forgo his remaining eligibility and enter the 2018 NFL Draft. He attended the NFL Scouting Combine in Indianapolis and completed all of the combine drills, but opted to skip the bench press. Green underwent routine combine medical testing. His MRI showed his ACL was "wavy" which caused some uneasiness among teams.

External videos
- Rasheem Green's NFL Combine Workout
- Rasheem Green's 40-yard dash
- Rasheem Green's broad and vertical jump

On March 21, 2018, Green participated at USC's pro day, but chose to stand on his combine numbers and only performed positional drills. Green attended pre-draft visits with the New England Patriots, Detroit Lions, Seattle Seahawks, Los Angeles Chargers, and Los Angeles Rams. He also had private workouts with the New Orleans Saints, Houston Texans, Patriots, and Buffalo Bills. Team doctors from the Texans and Seahawks had Green undergo additional MRIs and concluded his ACL to be intact. At the conclusion of the pre-draft process, Green was projected to be a second or third round pick by NFL draft experts and scouts. He was ranked the third best defensive end in the draft by Scouts Inc. and was ranked the fourth best defensive end by DraftScout.com.

Pre-draft measurables
Height	Weight	Arm length	Hand span	Wingspan	40-yard dash	10-yard split	20-yard split	20-yard shuttle	Three-cone drill	Vertical jump	Broad jump	Bench press
6 ft 4 1/4 in (1.94 m)	275 lb (125 kg)	33 3/4 in (0.86 m)	9 7/8 in (0.25 m)	6 ft 9 1/4 in (2.06 m)	4.73 s	1.66 s	2.75 s	4.39 s	7.24 s	32.5 in (0.83 m)	9 ft 10 in (3.00 m)	23 reps
All values from NFL Combine/Pro Day

=== Seattle Seahawks ===
The Seahawks selected Green in the third round (79th overall) of the 2018 NFL draft. Green was the eighth defensive end drafted in 2018. On June 20, 2018, the Seahawks signed Green to a four-year, $3.57 million contract that includes a signing bonus of $912,556.

External videos
- Seahawks draft Rasheem Green 79th overall

As a rookie he saw action in 10 games, recording 9 tackles and one sack. In the 2019 season Green played in 16 games, starting in 8 of them. He recorded 27 tackles and led the team in sacks with 4. On September 25, 2020, Green was placed on injured reserve with a neck injury. He was activated on November 7, 2020. He came back to finish with 2.0 sacks, six quarterback hits, two tackles for loss and one fumble recovery in 10 games played. Playing in every regular season game for the second time in three seasons while logging 846 defensive snaps in the 2021 season, he started 16 games and produced career-highs with 48 tackles, 6.5 sacks, 15 quarterback hits, six tackles for loss, and four pass deflections. On November 29, 2021 Green became the first player to block, recover and score for a defensive conversion since the league allowed for the possibility on extra points beginning in 2015. It was the first blocked kick returned for a score since 2019, and the 11th over the past seven seasons, with seven of those coming on a PAT. According to the NFL’s Next Gen Stats, Green reached a maximum speed of 18.41 mph on his 94-yard return, the fastest rate by a defensive lineman as a ball carrier since Jadeveon Clowney in 2019.

=== Houston Texans ===
On May 2, 2022, the Texans signed Green to a one-year contract. Green played in 16 games for the Texans in 2022, recording 42 tackles and 3.5 sacks in the process.

=== Chicago Bears ===
On April 6, 2023, Green signed with the Chicago Bears. He appeared in 17 games for the Chicago Bears and recorded 15 tackles and two sacks.

=== Jacksonville Jaguars ===
On July 30, 2024, Green signed with the Jacksonville Jaguars. He was released on August 16.
