= Marvell Tell =

American football player (born 1996)

Marvell Tell III
No. 39
- Position: Cornerback

Personal information
- Born: August 2, 1996 (age 30); Pasadena, California, U.S.
- Listed height: 6 ft 2 in (1.88 m)
- Listed weight: 195 lb (88 kg)

Career information
- High school: Crespi Carmelite (Encino, California)
- College: USC (2015–2018)
- NFL draft: 2019: 5th round, 144th overall pick

Career history
- Indianapolis Colts (2019–2021); Cincinnati Bengals (2022–2023)

Awards and highlights
- First-team All-Pac-12 (2017)

Career NFL statistics
- Total tackles: 26
- Pass deflections: 5
- Forced fumbles: 1
- Stats at Pro Football Reference

Marvell Tell III (born August 2, 1996) is an American former professional football cornerback. He played college football at USC, and played high school football at Crespi Carmelite High School.

== Early life ==
Playing at Crespi Carmelite High School in Encino, California, Tell played free safety and had ten scholarship offers after his sophomore year, which saw him intercept a pass and make over 50 tackles. He had to sit out part of his junior season due to a broken collarbone. His commitment to USC came at the Army All-American Bowl after his senior year at Crespi. Tell chose USC over Oregon, Texas A&M and Vanderbilt, all of whom he visited.

== College career ==
After playing sporadically during his freshman season at USC, Tell claimed a starting position in the defensive backfield for his sophomore season.

Tell made the 2017 All-Pac-12 Conference team on the first-team after his junior season.

Towards the end of his senior season, Tell sustained an ankle sprain. At the end of the season, he was named an honorable mention on the 2018 All-Pac-12 team.

== Professional career ==
=== Pre-draft ===
Pre-draft measurables
Height	Weight	Arm length	Hand span	40-yard dash	10-yard split	20-yard split	20-yard shuttle	Three-cone drill	Vertical jump	Broad jump	Bench press
6 ft 2 in (1.88 m)	198 lb (90 kg)	33 1/8 in (0.84 m)	9 3/4 in (0.25 m)	4.59 s	1.54 s	2.63 s	4.01 s	6.63 s	42.0 in (1.07 m)	11 ft 4 in (3.45 m)	8 reps
All values from NFL Combine/Pro Day

At the 2019 NFL Combine, Tell turned heads with a 42-inch vertical jump. Scouts noted his speed and fluidness but worried about his intangibles.

=== Indianapolis Colts ===
Tell was drafted by the Indianapolis Colts in the fifth round (144th overall) in the 2019 NFL draft. In week 9 against the Pittsburgh Steelers, Tell forced a fumble on running back Jaylen Samuels that was recovered by teammate Justin Houston in the 26–24 loss.

On August 5, 2020, Tell announced he would opt out of the 2020 season due to the COVID-19 pandemic.

On September 1, 2021, Tell was waived by the Colts and re-signed to the practice squad.

On February 21, 2022, Tell re-signed with the Colts. He was waived on August 30, 2022.

=== Cincinnati Bengals ===
On September 1, 2022, the Cincinnati Bengals signed Tell to their practice squad. He signed a reserve/future contract on January 31, 2023. He was placed on injured reserve on August 29, 2023. He was released on September 19.
