= Bubba Bolden =

American gridiron football player (born 1999)

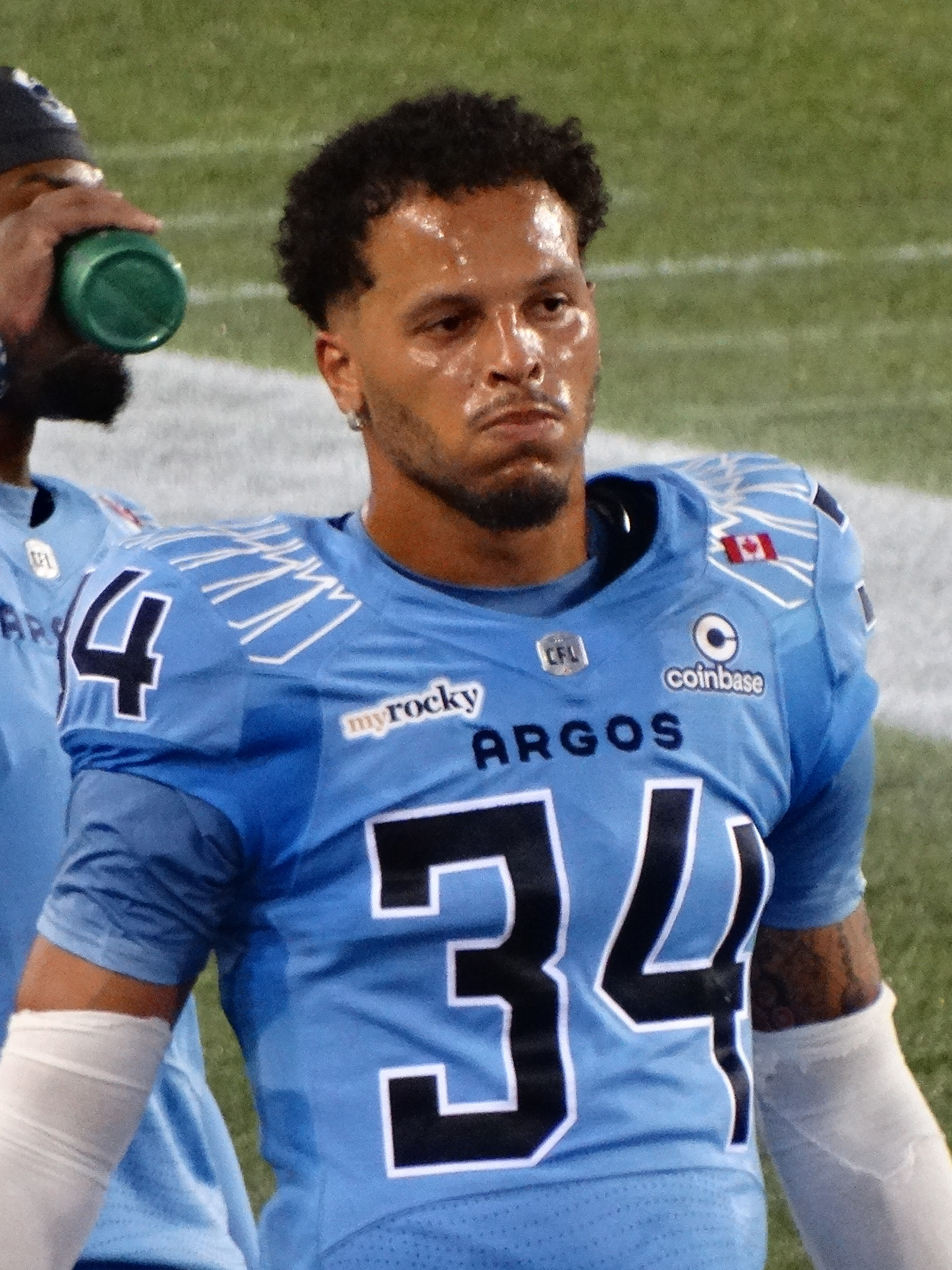
- Bolden with the Toronto Argonauts in 2026

No. 34 – Toronto Argonauts
- Position: Defensive back
- Roster status: Active
- CFL status: American

Personal information
- Born: May 29, 1999 (age 27); Las Vegas, Nevada, U.S.
- Listed height: 6 ft 3 in (1.91 m)
- Listed weight: 206 lb (93 kg)

Career information
- High school: Bishop Gorman (Las Vegas)
- College: USC (2017–2018) Miami (FL) (2019–2021)
- NFL draft: 2022: undrafted

Career history
- Seattle Seahawks (2022)*; Cleveland Browns (2022)*; San Antonio Brahmas (2024)*; Birmingham Stallions (2024)*; Minnesota Vikings (2025)*; Montreal Alouettes (2026); Toronto Argonauts (2026–present)
- * Offseason or practice squad member only

Awards and highlights
- Second-team All-ACC (2020)
- Stats at Pro Football Reference

Bubba Bolden (born May 29, 1999) is an American professional football defensive back for the Toronto Argonauts of the Canadian Football League (CFL). Bolden initially played college football for the USC Trojans before transferring to the Miami Hurricanes. He was signed by the Seattle Seahawks as an undrafted free agent in 2022.

== Professional career ==
Pre-draft measurables
Height	Weight	Arm length	Hand span	Wingspan	40-yard dash	10-yard split	20-yard split	20-yard shuttle	Three-cone drill	Vertical jump	Broad jump	Bench press
6 ft 2 1/8 in (1.88 m)	209 lb (95 kg)	31 3/8 in (0.80 m)	9 in (0.23 m)	6 ft 4 7/8 in (1.95 m)	4.47 s	1.55 s	2.59 s	4.20 s	7.09 s	31.0 in (0.79 m)	9 ft 10 in (3.00 m)	15 reps
All values from NFL Combine/Pro Day

=== Seattle Seahawks ===
Bolden signed with the Seattle Seahawks as an undrafted free agent on May 6, 2022. He was waived on August 20, 2022.

=== Cleveland Browns ===
On November 22, 2022, Bolden was signed to the Cleveland Browns' practice squad. He signed a reserve/future contract on January 9, 2023. He was waived/injured on August 12, 2023. and reverted to the team's injured reserve list the next day. He was waived from injured reserve with an injury settlement on August 17.

=== San Antonio Brahmas ===
On December 22, 2023, Bolden was signed by the San Antonio Brahmas of the XFL.

=== Birmingham Stallions ===
On January 22, 2024, Bolden was traded to the Birmingham Stallions in exchange for defensive back Alijah Holder. He was waived on March 22.

The NFL suspended Bolden for the first three weeks of the 2024 NFL season, and he was reinstated on September 24, 2024.

=== Minnesota Vikings ===
On March 10, 2025, Bolden signed with the Minnesota Vikings. He was released on June 13.

=== Montreal Alouettes ===
On September 3, 2025, Bolden signed with the Montreal Alouettes of the Canadian Football League (CFL). He was released on July 6, 2026.

=== Toronto Argonauts ===
On July 7, 2026, Bolden signed with the Toronto Argonauts. Bolden made his Toronto debut at safety on July 10, 2026 against the Winnipeg Blue Bombers.
