= Iman Marshall =

American football player (born 1997)

No. 37
- Position: Cornerback

Personal information
- Born: February 27, 1997 (age 29); Long Beach, California, U.S.
- Listed height: 6 ft 1 in (1.85 m)
- Listed weight: 210 lb (95 kg)

Career information
- High school: Long Beach Polytechnic
- College: USC (2015–2018)
- NFL draft: 2019: 4th round, 127th overall pick

Career history
- Baltimore Ravens (2019–2021); New Jersey Generals (2023)*
- * Offseason or practice squad member only

Awards and highlights
- Second-team All-Pac-12 (2018)

Career NFL statistics
- Total tackles: 1
- Stats at Pro Football Reference

Iman Marshall (born February 27, 1997) is an American former professional football player who was a cornerback in the National Football League (NFL). He played college football for the USC Trojans.

== Early life ==
Marshall attended Long Beach Polytechnic High School in Long Beach, California. He played wide receiver and safety in high school. He was rated as a five-star recruit and was ranked among the top players in his class. He committed to the University of Southern California (USC) to play college football.

== College career ==
As a true freshman at USC in 2015, Marshall appeared in all 14 games and made 12 starts. He recorded 67 tackles and three interceptions. As a sophomore in 2016, he started all 13 games, recording 52 tackles and three interceptions.

== Professional career ==
=== Baltimore Ravens ===
Marshall was selected by the Baltimore Ravens in the fourth round (127th overall) of the 2019 NFL draft. He was placed on injured reserve on September 2, 2019. Marshall was designated for return from injured reserve on October 28, and began practicing with the team again. He was activated on November 12.

On August 16, 2020, Marshall suffered a torn ACL after coming down awkwardly on his right leg. The injury forced him to get surgery and miss the entire 2020 season. The following day, he was placed on injured reserve. He was placed on the reserve/COVID-19 list by the team on November 12, and moved back to injured reserve on November 30.

On August 16, 2021, Marshall suffered another torn ACL and was placed on injured reserve.

On July 23, 2022, Marshall was waived by the Ravens.

=== New Jersey Generals ===
On January 14, 2023, Marshall signed with the New Jersey Generals of the United States Football League (USFL). On March 10, Marshall was released by the Generals.
