= Nico Falah =

American football player (born 1995)

No. 74
- Position: Guard

Personal information
- Born: January 6, 1995 (age 31); Hermosa Beach, California, U.S.
- Listed height: 6 ft 4 in (1.93 m)
- Listed weight: 301 lb (137 kg)

Career information
- High school: St. John Bosco; Bellflower, California
- College: USC
- NFL draft: 2018: undrafted

Career history
- Tennessee Titans (2018)*; New York Jets (2018)*; Denver Broncos (2018–2019); Las Vegas Raiders (2021)*; Pittsburgh Maulers (2022)
- * Offseason or practice squad member only
- Stats at Pro Football Reference

Nico Falah (born January 6, 1995) is an American former professional football guard. He played college football at USC.

== Professional career ==
=== Tennessee Titans ===
Falah signed with the Tennessee Titans as an undrafted free agent on May 11, 2018. He was waived on September 1, 2018.

=== New York Jets ===
On September 3, 2018, Falah was signed to the New York Jets practice squad.

=== Denver Broncos ===
On October 22, 2018, Falah was signed by the Denver Broncos off the Jets practice squad.

On May 13, 2019, Falah was carted off the practice field with a lower left injury. It was later revealed he suffered a season-ending torn Achilles. He was placed on injured reserve the following day.

On July 27, 2020, he was waived by the Broncos.

=== Las Vegas Raiders ===
On December 30, 2021, Falah was signed to the Las Vegas Raiders practice squad. He was released on January 3, 2022.

=== Pittsburgh Maulers ===
Falah was drafted by the Pittsburgh Maulers of the United States Football League in the 20th round of the 2022 USFL draft. He was transferred to the team's inactive roster on April 22, 2022. He was transferred to the active roster on April 30, and back to the inactive roster on May 6 with an illness. He was moved back to the active roster on May 14. He was transferred to the inactive roster again on May 20.
