= Deontay Burnett =

American football player (born 1997)

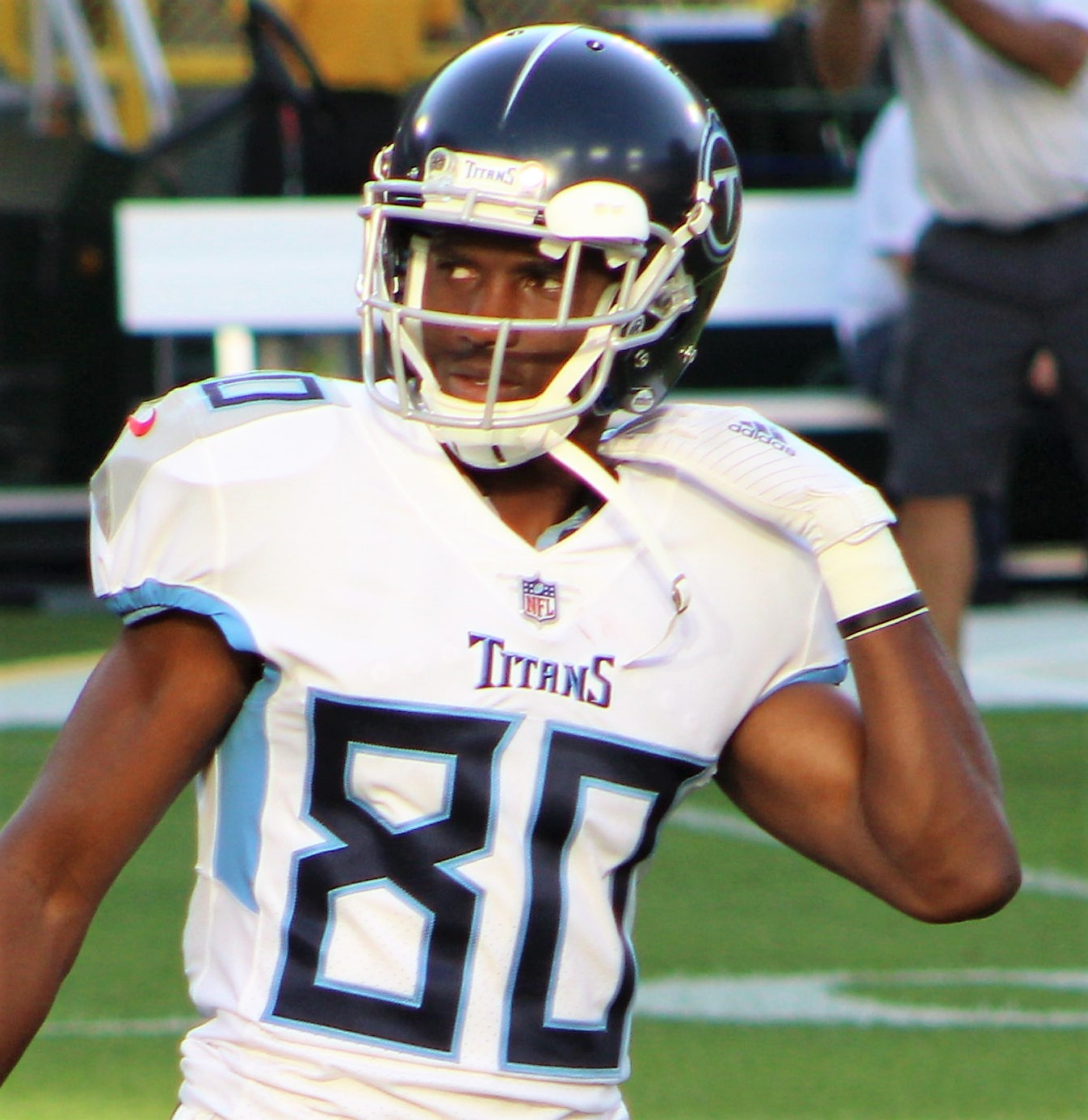
- Burnett with the Tennessee Titans in 2018

Profile
- Position: Wide receiver

Personal information
- Born: October 4, 1997 (age 29); Compton, California, U.S.
- Listed height: 6 ft 0 in (1.83 m)
- Listed weight: 175 lb (79 kg)

Career information
- High school: Gardena (CA) Serra
- College: USC (2015–2017)
- NFL draft: 2018: undrafted

Career history
- Tennessee Titans (2018)*; New York Jets (2018); San Francisco 49ers (2019)*; Philadelphia Eagles (2019–2020); Houston Roughnecks (2023); Arlington Renegades (2024); Dallas Cowboys (2024)*; Arlington / Dallas Renegades (2025–2026)
- * Offseason or practice squad member only

Awards and highlights
- All-XFL Team (2023); Second-team All-Pac-12 (2017)

Career NFL statistics
- Receptions: 15
- Receiving yards: 210
- Stats at Pro Football Reference

Deontay Burnett (born October 4, 1997) is an American professional football wide receiver. He played college football at USC and was signed as an undrafted free agent by the Tennessee Titans in 2018. Burnett has also been a member of the New York Jets, San Francisco 49ers, Philadelphia Eagles, Houston Roughnecks, Dallas Cowboys, and Arlington / Dallas Renegades.

== Early life ==
Burnett attended Junípero Serra High School in Gardena, California. He was rated as a three-star recruit and was not a highly recruited player coming out of high school. He committed to the University of Southern California (USC) to play college football. Burnett was offered a blueshirt scholarship on the day of signing day, and chose to commit to the school he dreamed of playing for as a kid.

== College career ==
As a true freshman at USC in 2015, Burnett appeared in all but two of the Trojans' games. He was a backup receiver, finishing the year with 10 receptions for 161 yards. He led the team in receiving against California with 3 receptions for 82 yards. In his sophomore season at USC in 2016, Burnett broke out as one of the top-three targets for the Trojans. He appeared in all 13 games, started the last 5 as the slot receiver, and finished with 56 receptions for 622 yards with 7 touchdowns. He added on with 3 carries for 31 yards. Deontay Burnett broke out in the 2017 Rose Bowl Game, where he caught 13 passes for 164 yards and 3 touchdowns. Burnett was given numerous post-season accolades, as he made the 2016 AP All-Bowl Team first-team, ESPN All-Bowl Team first-team and ESPN Pac-12 All-Bowl Team first-team.

== Professional career ==
Pre-draft measurables
Height	Weight	Arm length	Hand span	Wingspan
5 ft 11 5/8 in (1.82 m)	186 lb (84 kg)	31 1/2 in (0.80 m)	8 5/8 in (0.22 m)	6 ft 2 1/2 in (1.89 m)
All values from NFL Combine

=== Tennessee Titans ===
Burnett signed with the Tennessee Titans as an undrafted free agent on May 11, 2018. He was waived on September 1, 2018.

=== New York Jets ===
On September 3, 2018, Burnett was signed to the New York Jets' practice squad. He was released on September 21, 2018, but was re-signed four days later. He was promoted to the active roster on October 20, 2018. Burnett made his NFL debut on October 21, 2018, in a 37–17 loss to the Minnesota Vikings, catching one pass for nine yards. In Week 8 against the Chicago Bears, Burnett finished with a team high of both 61 receiving yards and 4 receptions as the Jets lost 10–24.

On August 31, 2019, Burnett was waived by the Jets.

=== San Francisco 49ers ===
On October 16, 2019, Burnett was signed to the San Francisco 49ers practice squad. He was released on December 10, 2019.

=== Philadelphia Eagles ===
Burnett was signed to the Philadelphia Eagles' practice squad on December 12, 2019. He was promoted to the active roster on December 24, 2019. In week 17, he caught 2 passes for 48 yards in the 34–17 win against the Giants.

Burnett was waived on September 3, 2020, and re-signed to the practice squad three days later. He was elevated to the active roster on September 26 and October 3 for the team's weeks 3 and 4 games against the Cincinnati Bengals and San Francisco 49ers, and reverted to the practice squad after each game. He was placed on the practice squad/COVID-19 list by the team on November 19, 2020, and restored to the practice squad on December 3. In total, Burnett played in 2 games, and had 3 receptions for 19 yards. He signed a reserve/future contract with the Eagles on January 4, 2021. He was waived with a non-football injury designation on March 23, 2021.

=== Houston Roughnecks ===
On November 17, 2022, Burnett was drafted by the Houston Roughnecks of the XFL. The Roughnecks brand was transferred to the Houston Gamblers when the XFL and United States Football League (USFL) merged to create the United Football League (UFL).

=== Arlington Renegades (first stint) ===
On January 5, 2024, Burnett was selected by the Arlington Renegades during the 2024 UFL dispersal draft.

=== Dallas Cowboys ===
Burnett signed with the Dallas Cowboys on July 27, 2024. He was waived on August 26.

=== Arlington / Dallas Renegades (second stint) ===
On January 27, 2025, Burnett re-signed with the Arlington Renegades.
