= 2016 USC Trojans football team =

American college football season

2016 USC Trojans football

Rose Bowl champion

Rose Bowl, W 52–49 vs. Penn State
- Conference: Pac-12 Conference
- South Division

Ranking
- Coaches: No. 5
- AP: No. 3
- Record: 10–3 (7–2 Pac-12)
- Head coach: Clay Helton (1st season)
- Offensive coordinator: Tee Martin (2nd season)
- Offensive scheme: Multiple
- Defensive coordinator: Clancy Pendergast (2nd season)
- Base defense: 5–2
- Captain: 4: Max Browne; Zach Banner; Michael Hutchings; Adoree' Jackson
- Home stadium: Los Angeles Memorial Coliseum

2016 Pac-12 Conference football standings
	Conf.			Overall
Team	W		L	W		L
North Division
No. 4 Washington xy$^	8	–	1	12	–	2
Washington State	7	–	2	8	–	5
No. 12 Stanford	6	–	3	10	–	3
California	3	–	6	5	–	7
Oregon State	3	–	6	4	–	8
Oregon	2	–	7	4	–	8
South Division
No. 17 Colorado xy	8	–	1	10	–	4
No. 3 USC	7	–	2	10	–	3
No. 23 Utah	5	–	4	9	–	4
Arizona State	2	–	7	5	–	7
UCLA	2	–	7	4	–	8
Arizona	1	–	8	3	–	9
Championship: Washington 41, Colorado 10
^ – College Football Playoff participant; $ – Conference champion; x – Division champion/co-champions; y – Championship game participant; Rankings from AP Poll

The 2016 USC Trojans football team represented the University of Southern California in the 2016 NCAA Division I FBS football season. They played their home games at the Los Angeles Memorial Coliseum as part of the South Division of the Pac-12 Conference. They were led by head coach Clay Helton in his first full season after replacing Steve Sarkisian in the sixth game of the 2015 season. They finished the season 10–3, 7–2 in Pac-12 play to finish in second place in the South Division. They were invited to the Rose Bowl where they defeated Big Ten Conference champion Penn State.

== Personnel ==
=== Coaching staff ===
Name	Position	Seasons at USC	Alma mater	Before USC
Clay Helton	Head coach	6	Houston (1994)	Memphis – Oc coordinator (2009)
John Baxter	Special teams coordinator / tight ends coach	5	Iowa State (1987)	Michigan – St coordinator (2015)
Ronnie Bradford	Secondary coach	1	Colorado (1995)	LA Tech – DB Coach / st coordinator (2015)
Neil Callaway	Offensive line coach	1	Alabama (1977)	Western Kentucky – OL Coach (2015)
Tyson Helton	Quarterbacks coach / pass game coordinator	1	Houston (1999)	Western Kentucky – QB Coach / offensive coordinator (2015)
Tee Martin	Offensive coordinator / wide receivers coach	5	Tennessee (2000)	Kentucky – WR Coach (2011)
Johnny Nansen	Outside linebackers coach / recruiting coordinator / assistant head coach	3	Washington State (1997)	Washington – St coordinator / rb coach (2013)
Clancy Pendergast	Defensive coordinator / inside linebackers coach	3	Arizona (1990)	San Francisco 49ers – LB Coach (2015)
Tommie Robinson	Tailbacks Coach / run game coordinator	2	Troy (1985)	Texas – TB Coach (2015)
Kenechi Udeze	Defensive line coach	2	USC (2003)	Pittsburgh – Assistant strength and conditioning coach (2014)
Ivan Lewis	Strength and conditioning	3	San Diego (2003)	Washington – Strength and conditioning (2013)

=== Roster ===
2016 USC Trojans Football roster
Quarterback: 10 Jalen Greene – (redshirt) Sophomore (6′1, 195) (+WR); 14 Sam Darnold – (redshirt) Freshman (6′4, 215); 15 Thomas Fitts – (redshirt) Freshman (6′2, 195); 16 Holden Thomas – Freshman (6′5, 195); 19 Matt Fink – Freshman (6′3, 180) *; Tailback: 16 Dominic Davis – Sophomore (5′10, 175) (+WR); 22 Justin Davis – Senior (6′1, 195); 25 Ronald Jones II – Sophomore (6′0, 185); 26 James Toland IV – (redshirt) Junior (5′11, 185); 28 Aca'Cedric Ware – Sophomore (6′0, 200); 29 Vavae Malepeai – Freshman (6′0, 190) *; Fullback: 38 Chris Edmondson – Freshman (5′11, 210) *; 47 Reuben Peters – (redshirt) Sophomore (6′0, 225); Wide receiver: 1 Darreus Rogers – Senior (6′1, 215); 6 Michael Pittman Jr. – Freshman (6′4, 210) *; 7 Steven Mitchell – (redshirt) Junior (5′10, 190); 9 JuJu Smith-Schuster – Junior (6′2, 215); 13 De'Quan Hampton – Senior (6′4, 220); 15 Isaac Whitney – (redshirt) Senior (6′3, 205); 17 Josh Imatorbhebhe – Freshman (6′2, 210) *; 21 Tyler Vaughns – Freshman (6′2, 180) *; 23 Velus Jones Jr. – Freshman (6′0, 185) *; 41 Milo Stewart – (redshirt) Junior (5′9, 170); 44 Jake Russell – (redshirt) Freshman (5′11, 170); 80 Deontay Burnett – Sophomore (6′0, 170); 81 Trevon Sidney – Freshman (5′11, 170) *; 85 Jackson Boyer – (redshirt) Junior (6′3, 195); Tight end: 48 Taylor McNamara – (redshirt) Senior (6′5, 245); 82 Tyler Petite – Sophomore (6′6, 235); 86 Cary Angeline – Freshman (6′6, 230) *; 87 Alec Hursh – (redshirt) Sophomore (6′3, 210); 88 Daniel Imatorbhebhe – (redshirt) Freshman (6′4, 225)	Offensive lineman: 50 Toa Lobendahn – C – Junior (6′3, 290); 51 Damien Mama – OG – Junior (6′4, 355); 56 Jordan Austin – OG-OT – (redshirt) Sophomore (6′5, 280); 60 Viane Talamaivao – OG – Junior (6′2, 320); 62 Khaliel Rodgers – (redshirt) Junior (6′3, 305) (+DT); 63 Roy Hemsley – OG-OT – (redshirt) Freshman (6′5, 315); 65 Frank Martin II – OG-OT – Freshman (6′5, 310) *; 66 Cole Smith – C – (redshirt) Freshman (6′4, 280); 68 Jordan Simmons – OG – (redshirt) Senior (6′4, 325); 70 Chuma Edoga – OT – Sophomore (6′4, 280); 72 Chad Wheeler – OT – (redshirt) Senior (6′7, 280); 73 Zach Banner – OT – (redshirt) Senior (6′9, 360); 74 Nico Falah – C-OT – (redshirt) Junior (6′4, 285); 76 Clayton Johnston – OT – (redshirt) Freshman (6′6, 290); 77 Chris Brown – OG – (redshirt) Sophomore (6′5, 295); 78 Nathan Smith – OT – Freshman (6′6, 265) *; Defensive tackle: 44 Malik Dorton – (redshirt) Sophomore (6′2, 275); 53 Kevin Scott – (redshirt) Freshman (6′5, 300); 79 Connor Rossow – Freshman (6′2, 305); 92 Jacob Daniel – Sophomore (6′4, 325); 93 Liam Jimmons – Freshman (6′5, 265) *; 94 Rasheem Green – Sophomore (6′5, 285); 95 Kenny Bigelow Jr. – (redshirt) Junior (6′3, 290); 96 Stevie Tu'ikolovatu – (redshirt) Senior (6′1, 320); 98 Josh Fatu – Junior (6′3, 290); Defensive end: 45 Porter Gustin – Sophomore (6′5, 250); 49 Matt Bayle – (redshirt) Freshman (6′2, 215); 89 Christian Rector – (redshirt) Freshman (6′5, 260); 90 Connor Murphy – Freshman (6′7, 255) *; 99 Oluwole Betiku Jr. – Freshman (6′3, 250) *; Placekicker: 39 Matt Boermeester – (redshirt) Junior (6′0, 180); 46 Wyatt Schmidt – (redshirt) Sophomore (6′3, 215); 49 Michael Brown – Freshman (6′2, 195) (Blueshirt); Punter: 36 Chris Tilbey – (redshirt) Sophomore (6′5, 220); 38 Reid Budrovich – (redshirt) Sophomore (5′11, 185); 47 James Bermingham Jr. – (redshirt) Sophomore (6′4, 185)	Linebacker: 10 John Houston Jr. – (redshirt) Freshman (6′3, 220); 18 Quinton Powell – Senior (6′2, 205); 19 Michael Hutchings – Senior (6′1, 225); 34 Olajuwon Tucker – Junior (6′3, 235); 35 Cameron Smith – Sophomore (6′2, 245); 42 Uchenna Nwosu – Junior (6′3, 210); 50 Grant Moore – (redshirt) Sophomore (6′0, 220); 51 Joel Foy – (redshirt) Junior (6′1, 225); 52 Christian Herrera – (redshirt) Junior (6′1, 210); 56 Jordan Iosefa – Freshman (6′2, 215) *; Cornerback: 1 Jack Jones – Freshman (5′11, 170) *; 2 Adoree' Jackson – Junior (5′11, 185) (+WR & RET); 8 Iman Marshall – Sophomore (6′2, 200); 14 Isaiah Langley – Sophomore (6′0, 165); 17 Keyshawn Pie Young – Freshman (5′11, 175); 23 Jonathan Lockett – Junior (5′11, 180); 27 Ajene Harris – (redshirt) Sophomore (5′11, 185) (+WR); 29 Kevin Carrasco – (redshirt) Junior (6′0, 185); 34 Yoofi Quansah – (redshirt) Junior (5′8, 165); 38 Jalen Jones – (redshirt) Sophomore (5′8, 155); Safety: 4 Chris Hawkins – (redshirt) Junior (5′11, 190); 7 Marvell Tell – Sophomore (6′2, 190); 21 Jamel Cook – Freshman (6′3, 185) *; 22 Leon McQuay III – Senior (6′1, 190); 24 John Plattenburg – Junior (5′11, 185); 26 Davonte Nunnery – (redshirt) Sophomore (5′10, 205); 28 C.J. Pollard – Freshman (6′1, 185) *; 30 Ykili Ross – (redshirt) Freshman (6′2, 185) (+CB); 31 Richard Hagestad – Freshman (6′1, 205); 37 Matt Lopes – (redshirt) Junior (5′11, 185); 41 Deion Hart – (redshirt) Senior (6′0, 195); Long snappers: 61 Jake Olson – (redshirt) Freshman (6′4, 195); 92 Zach Smith – Senior (6′1, 220)
: 2016 USC Trojans Football Commits (January 24, 2016)

=== Returning starters ===
USC returns 32 starters in 2016, including 17 on offense, 13 on defense, and two on special teams.

Key departures include Cody Kessler (QB – 14 games), Tre Madden (TB – 6 games), Jahleel Pinner (FB – 4 games), Max Tuerk (C – 5 games), Antwaun Woods (NT – 13 games), Delvon Simmons (DT – 14 games), Greg Townsend Jr. (DE – 13 games), Claude Pelon (DE – 2 games), Su'a Cravens (LB – 14 games), Scott Felix (LB – 10 games), Anthony Sarao (LB – 13 games), Lamar Dawson (LB – 1 game), Kevon Seymour (CB – 4 games), Alex Wood (K – 13 games), Kris Albarado (P – 14 games).

Other departures include Soma Vainuku (FB), Connor Spears (TE).

==== Offense (17) ====
Player	Class	Position	Games started
Justin Davis	Senior	Tailback	8 games
JuJu Smith-Schuster	Junior	Wide receiver	14 games
Darreus Rogers	Senior	Wide receiver	11 games
Steven Mitchell	Junior (redshirt)	Wide receiver	6 games
Jalen Greene	Sophomore (redshirt)	Wide receiver	3 games
Isaac Whitney	Senior (redshirt)	Wide receiver	1 game
Taylor McNamara	Senior (redshirt)	Tight end	14 games
Tyler Petite	Sophomore	Tight end	2 games
Zach Banner	Senior (redshirt)	Offensive tackle	13 games
Chad Wheeler	Senior (redshirt)	Offensive tackle	13 games
Damien Mama	Junior	Offensive guard	13 games
Toa Lobendahn	Junior	Offensive line	7 games
Viane Talamaivao	Junior	Offensive guard	9 games
Khaliel Rodgers	Junior (redshirt)	Center	6 games
Chuma Edoga	Sophomore	Offensive tackle	2 games
Chris Brown	Sophomore (redshirt)	Offensive line	2 games
Nico Falah	Junior (redshirt)	Offensive line	1 games

==== Defense (13) ====
Player	Class	Position	Games started
Noah Jefferson	Sophomore	Defensive tackle	1 game
Cameron Smith	Sophomore	Inside linebacker	9 games
Olajuwon Tucker	Sophomore	Inside linebacker	3 games
Porter Gustin	Sophomore	Outside Linebacker	2 games
Michael Hutchings	Senior	Inside linebacker	1 game
Uchenna Nwosu	Junior	Linebacker	1 game
Adoree' Jackson	Junior	Cornerback; Wide receiver	13 games 1 game
Iman Marshall	Sophomore	Cornerback	12 games
Jonathan Lockett	Junior	Cornerback	2 games
Chris Hawkins	Junior (redshirt)	Safety	14 games
John Plattenburg	Junior	Safety	8 games
Leon McQuay III	Senior	Safety	2 games
Marvell Tell	Sophomore	Safety	2 games

==== Special teams (2) ====
Player	Class	Position	Games started
Matt Boermeester	Junior (redshirt)	Kicker	14 games
Zach Smith	Senior	Long snapper	14 games

=== Depth chart ===
Defense

FS
Marvell Tell
John Plattenburg
–

WLB	SLB
Michael Hutchings	Cameron Smith
Quinton Powell	Olajuwon Tucker
John Houston Jr.	Jordan Iosefa

SS
Leon McQuay III
Chris Hawkins
Matt Lopes

CB
Adoree' Jackson
Jack Jones
Isaiah Langley

OLB	DT	NT	DT	DE
Porter Gustin	Malik Dorton	Stevie Tu'ikolovatu	Rasheem Green	Uchenna Nwosu
Connor Murphy	Kevin Scott	Jacob Daniel	Christian Rector	Oluwole Betiku Jr.
–	Liam Jimmons	–	–	–

CB
Iman Marshall
Ajene Harris
Ykili Ross

Offense

WR
JuJu Smith-Schuster
De'Quan Hampton
Jackson Boyer

WR
Deontay Burnett
Michael Pittman Jr.
Josh Imatorbhebhe

LT	LG	C	RG	RT
Chad Wheeler	Damien Mama	Nico Falah	Viane Talamaivao	Zach Banner
Chuma Edoga	Chris Brown	Cole Smith	Jordan Austin	Jordan Simmons
–	Roy Hemsley	–	–	Clayton Johnston

TE
Taylor McNamara
Tyler Petite
Daniel Imatorbhebhe

WR
Darreus Rogers
Isaac Whitney
Trevon Sidney

QB
Sam Darnold
Jalen Greene
Matt Fink

Key reserves
– Dominic Davis – TB
– James Toland IV – TB
- Tyler Vaughns – WR
- Velus Jones Jr. – WR
– Frank Martin II – OL
- Jamel Cook – DB
Out (Season)
– Vavae Malepeai – TB
– Steven Mitchell – WR
– Nathan Smith – OT
- Toa Lobendahn – C
– Kenny Bigelow Jr. – DT
– Jonathan Lockett – CB
Out
- Khaliel Rodgers – C
- Josh Fatu – DT
- Keyshawn 'Pie' Young – CB
Suspension
– Jabari Ruffin – LB
(Transfer out)
- Max Browne – QB
– E.J. Price – OT
– Noah Jefferson – DT

RB
Ronald Jones II
Justin Davis
Aca'Cedric Ware

Special teams
PK Matt Boermeester
P Chris Tilbey
KR Adoree' Jackson & Jack Jones & Steven Mitchell
PR Adoree' Jackson & Jack Jones & Deontay Burnett
LS Zach Smith
H Wyatt Schmidt

Official Depth Chart 2016

True Freshman
Double Position : *

=== Recruiting class ===
College recruiting information (2016)
Name	Hometown	School	Height	Weight	Commit date
Oluwole Betiku #8 DE	Gardena, CA	Junipero Serra High School	6 ft 4 in (1.93 m)	246 lb (112 kg)	January 11, 2016 (Signed) / December 25, 2015 (Committed)
Oluwole Betiku #8 DE	Recruit ratings: Scout: 247Sports: ESPN:				
Jamel Cook #3 S	Miami, FL	Miami Central High School	6 ft 4 in (1.93 m)	192 lb (87 kg)	February 3, 2016 (Signed) / February 3, 2016 (Committed)
Jamel Cook #3 S	Recruit ratings: Scout: 247Sports: ESPN:				
E.J. Price #8 OT	Lawrenceville, GA	Archer High School	6 ft 6 in (1.98 m)	324 lb (147 kg)	February 3, 2016 (Signed) / February 3, 2016 (Committed)
E.J. Price #8 OT	Recruit ratings: Scout: 247Sports: ESPN:				
Matt Fink #3 QB-DT	Glendora, CA	Glendora High School	6 ft 3 in (1.91 m)	179 lb (81 kg)	January 11, 2016 (Signed) / May 4, 2015 (Committed)
Matt Fink #3 QB-DT	Recruit ratings: Scout: 247Sports: ESPN:				
Tyler Vaughns #12 WR	La Puente, CA	Bishop Amat High School	6 ft 2 in (1.88 m)	180 lb (82 kg)	February 3, 2016 (Signed) / August 19, 2015 (Committed)
Tyler Vaughns #12 WR	Recruit ratings: Scout: 247Sports: ESPN:				
Jack Jones #10 CB	Long Beach, CA	Long Beach Polytechnic High School	5 ft 10 in (1.78 m)	157 lb (71 kg)	February 3, 2016 (Signed) / February 3, 2016 (Committed)
Jack Jones #10 CB	Recruit ratings: Scout: 247Sports: ESPN:				
Josh Imatorbhebhe #15 WR	Suwanee, GA	North Gwinnett High School	6 ft 2 in (1.88 m)	205 lb (93 kg)	January 11, 2016 (Signed) / May 18, 2015 (Committed)
Josh Imatorbhebhe #15 WR	Recruit ratings: Scout: 247Sports: ESPN:				
Trevon Sidney #8 ATH (WR / DB)	La Puente, CA	Bishop Amat High School	5 ft 11 in (1.80 m)	164 lb (74 kg)	February 3, 2016 (Signed) / July 10, 2015 (Committed)
Trevon Sidney #8 ATH (WR / DB)	Recruit ratings: Scout: 247Sports: ESPN:				
Frank Martin II #19 OT	Santa Ana, CA	Mater Dei High School	6 ft 5 in (1.96 m)	302 lb (137 kg)	February 3, 2016 (Signed) / April 16, 2015 (Committed)
Frank Martin II #19 OT	Recruit ratings: Scout: 247Sports: ESPN:				
Keyshawn Pie Young #15 ATH (WR / DB)	Miami, FL	Miami Senior High School	5 ft 11 in (1.80 m)	163 lb (74 kg)	February 3, 2016 (Signed) / February 3, 2016 (Committed)
Keyshawn Pie Young #15 ATH (WR / DB)	Recruit ratings: Scout: 247Sports: ESPN:				
Cary Angeline #8 TE-Y	Exton, PA	Downingtown East High School	6 ft 7 in (2.01 m)	230 lb (100 kg)	February 3, 2016 (Signed) / June 26, 2015 (Committed)
Cary Angeline #8 TE-Y	Recruit ratings: Scout: 247Sports: ESPN:				
Michael Pittman Jr. #45 WR	Westlake Village, CA	Oaks Christian High School	6 ft 4 in (1.93 m)	205 lb (93 kg)	January 11, 2016 (Signed) / July 4, 2015 (Committed)
Michael Pittman Jr. #45 WR	Recruit ratings: Scout: 247Sports: ESPN:				
C.J. Pollard #16 S	Gardena, CA	Junipero Serra High School	6 ft 1 in (1.85 m)	183 lb (83 kg)	January 11, 2016 (Signed) / July 9, 2015 (Committed)
C.J. Pollard #16 S	Recruit ratings: Scout: 247Sports: ESPN:				
Vavae Malepeai #20 TB	Mililani, HI	Mililani High School	6 ft 0 in (1.83 m)	204 lb (93 kg)	February 3, 2016 (Signed) / February 3, 2016 (Committed)
Vavae Malepeai #20 TB	Recruit ratings: Scout: 247Sports: ESPN:				
Nathan Smith #36 OT	Murrieta, CA	Murrieta High School	6 ft 6 in (1.98 m)	259 lb (117 kg)	January 11, 2016 (Signed) / April 15, 2015 (Committed)
Nathan Smith #36 OT	Recruit ratings: Scout: 247Sports: ESPN:				
Connor Murphy #58 DE	Phoenix, AZ	Brophy Prep	6 ft 7 in (2.01 m)	249 lb (113 kg)	February 3, 2016 (Signed) / February 3, 2016 (Committed)
Connor Murphy #58 DE	Recruit ratings: Scout: 247Sports: ESPN:				
Liam Jimmons #66 DE	Huntington Beach, CA	Huntington Beach High School	6 ft 4 in (1.93 m)	235 lb (107 kg)	January 11, 2016 (Signed) / June 14, 2015 (Committed)
Liam Jimmons #66 DE	Recruit ratings: Scout: 247Sports: ESPN:				
Velus Jones Jr. #73 WR	Saraland, AL	Saraland High School	5 ft 11 in (1.80 m)	180 lb (82 kg)	February 3, 2016 (Signed) / January 23, 2016 (Committed)
Velus Jones Jr. #73 WR	Recruit ratings: Scout: 247Sports: ESPN:				
Jordan Iosefa #71 OLB	Honolulu, HI	Saint Louis School	6 ft 3 in (1.91 m)	216 lb (98 kg)	February 3, 2016 (Signed) / June 15, 2015 (Committed)
Jordan Iosefa #71 OLB	Recruit ratings: Scout: 247Sports: ESPN:				
Josh Fatu; JuCo DT	Long Beach, CA	Long Beach City College	6 ft 2 in (1.88 m)	280 lb (130 kg)	February 3, 2016 (Signed) / February 3, 2016 (Committed)
Josh Fatu; JuCo DT	Recruit ratings: Scout: 247Sports:				
Stevie Tu'ikolovatu; DT	Salt Lake City, UT	University of Utah	6 ft 1 in (1.85 m)	320 lb (150 kg)	June 16, 2016 (Transfer)
Stevie Tu'ikolovatu; DT	Recruit ratings: No ratings found				
Michael Brown; K	Temecual, CA	Linefield Christian School	6 ft 2 in (1.88 m)	195 lb (88 kg)	2017 Blue Shirt / February 1, 2015 (Committed)
Michael Brown; K	Recruit ratings: Scout: 247Sports: ESPN:				
Damon Johnson #10 LS	Glendora, CA	Glendora High School	6 ft 0 in (1.83 m)	205 lb (93 kg)	Walk-On / February 3, 2016 (Signed)
Damon Johnson #10 LS	Recruit ratings: Scout: 247Sports: ESPN:				
Thomas Holden; QB	Los Angeles, CA	Brentwood High School	6 ft 5 in (1.96 m)	195 lb (88 kg)	Walk-On / February 5, 2016 (Signed)
Thomas Holden; QB	Recruit ratings: Scout: 247Sports: ESPN:				
Connor Rossow; DT	Santa Ana, CA	Mater Dei High School	6 ft 2 in (1.88 m)	305 lb (138 kg)	Walk-On / August 4, 2016 (Signed)
Connor Rossow; DT	Recruit ratings: Scout: 247Sports: ESPN:				
Chris Edmondson; TB	Cibolo, TX	Clemens High School	5 ft 11 in (1.80 m)	210 lb (95 kg)	Walk-On / August 4, 2016 (Signed)
Chris Edmondson; TB	Recruit ratings: Scout: 247Sports: ESPN:				
Christian Herrera; MLB	Gardena, CA	El Camino JC	6 ft 1 in (1.85 m)	210 lb (95 kg)	2016 (Transfer)
Christian Herrera; MLB	Recruit ratings: No ratings found				
Overall recruit ranking: Scout: ? 247Sports: #14 ESPN: ?
Note: In many cases, Scout, Rivals, 247Sports, On3, and ESPN may conflict in their listings of height and weight.; In these cases, the average was taken. ESPN grades are on a 100-point scale.; Sources: "2016 Team Ranking". Rivals.com.

=== Scholarship distribution chart ===
Position	Freshman	Sophomore	Junior	Senior	2017 commit (13) 2017 signed	2018 commit (4)
QB 3 (1)	Sam Darnold; Matt Fink	Jalen Greene	–	–	Jack Sears	Matt Corral
TB 6 (1)	Vavae Malepeai	Dominic Davis; Ronald Jones II; Aca'Cedric Ware	James Toland IV	Justin Davis	Stephen Carr	-
FB 1	–	Reuben Peters	–	–	-	-
WR 11 (1)	Josh Imatorbhebhe; Velus Jones Jr. Michael Pittman Jr. Trevon Sidney; Tyler Vaughns	Deontay Burnett	Steven Mitchell Jr. Juju Smith-Schuster	De'Quan Hampton; Darreus Rogers; Isaac Whitney	Marlon Williams	-
TE 4 (1)	Cary Angeline; Daniel Imatorbhebhe	Tyler Petite	–	Taylor McNamara	Erik Krommenhoek	-
OL 16 (3)	Roy Hemsley; Clayton Johnston; Frank Martin II; Cole Smith; Nathan Smith	Jordan Austin; Chris Brown; Chuma Edoga	Nico Falah; Toa Lobendahn; Damien Mama; Khaliel Rodgers; Viane Talamaivao	Zach Banner; Jordan Simmons; Chad Wheeler	Brett Neilon; Alijah Vera-Tucker; Andrew Vorhees	-
DT 8	Liam Jimmons; Kevin Scott	Jacob Daniel; Malik Dorton; Rasheem Green	Kenny Bigelow Jr. Josh Fatu	Stevie Tu'ikolovatu	-	-
DE / OLB 4 (3)	Oluwole Betiku Jr. Connor Murphy; Christian Rector	Porter Gustin	–	–	Hunter Echols; Terrance Lang; Jacob Lichtenstein	Bo Calvert; Raymond Scott
ILB 7 (1)	John Houston Jr. Jordan Iosefa	Cameron Smith	Uchenna Nwosu; Olajuwon Tucker	Michael Hutchings; Quinton Powell	Juliano Falaniko	-
CB 7	Jack Jones; Keyshawn Pie Young	Ajene Harris; Isaiah Langley; Iman Marshall	Adoree' Jackson; Jonathan Lockett	–	-	Marcus Johnson
S 8 (1)	Jamel Cook; C.J. Pollard; Ykili Ross	Marvell Tell	Chris Hawkins; Matt Lopes; John Plattenburg	Leon McQuay	C.J. Miller	-
SP 4 (1)	Michael Brown	Chris Tilbey	Matt Boermeester	Zach Smith	Damon Johnson	-
ATH (3)	x	x	x	x	Juwan Burgess; Randal Grimes; Tayler Katoa	-

redshirt year used / redshirt year eligible / * : Former walk-on

– 85 scholarships permitted, 79 currently allotted to players. (Note: Max Browne, E.J. Price, Noah Jefferson, Jabari Ruffin & Scott Felix is still "counts" for 2016, bringing the total to 84).

– USC added one "blueshirt" who will count towards the class of 2017: Kicker Michael Brown.

– USC can sign 25 players in the class of 2017.

== 2016 NFL draft ==
Round	Pick	Player	Position	NFL team
2	53 (22)	Su'a Cravens (Junior)	Outside linebacker / Safety	Washington Redskins
3	66 (3)	Max Tuerk	Center	San Diego Chargers
3	93 (30)	Cody Kessler	Quarterback	Cleveland Browns
6	218 (43)	Kevon Seymour	Cornerback	Buffalo Bills
UFA	–	Claude Pelon	Defensive tackle	New York Jets
UFA	–	Tre Madden	Tailback	Seattle Seahawks
UFA	–	Soma Vainuku	Fullback	Houston Texans
UFA	–	Greg Townsend Jr.	Defensive end	Oakland Raiders
UFA	–	Delvon Simmons	Defensive tackle	Indianapolis Colts
UFA	–	Antwaun Woods	Defensive tackle	Tennessee Titans
UFA	–	Anthony Sarao	Linebacker	Indianapolis Colts
UFA	–	Jahleel Pinner	Fullback	–
UFA	–	Lamar Dawson	Linebacker	–

== Schedule ==
Date	Time	Opponent	Rank	Site	TV	Result	Attendance
September 3	5:00 p.m.	vs. No. 1 Alabama*	No. 20	AT&T Stadium; Arlington, TX (Advocare Classic)	ABC	L 6–52	81,359
September 10	11:00 a.m.	Utah State*		Los Angeles Memorial Coliseum; Los Angeles, CA	P12N	W 45–7	62,487
September 17	5:00 p.m.	at No. 7 Stanford		Stanford Stadium; Stanford, CA (rivalry)	ABC	L 10–27	48,763
September 23	6:30 p.m.	at No. 24 Utah		Rice-Eccles Stadium; Salt Lake City, UT	FS1	L 27–31	46,133
October 1	5:30 p.m.	Arizona State		Los Angeles Memorial Coliseum; Los Angeles, CA	FOX	W 41–20	71,214
October 8	1:00 p.m.	No. 21 Colorado		Los Angeles Memorial Coliseum; Los Angeles, CA	P12N	W 21–17	68,302
October 15	12:30 p.m.	at Arizona		Arizona Stadium; Tucson, AZ	FOX	W 48–14	55,463
October 27	7:30 p.m.	California		Los Angeles Memorial Coliseum; Los Angeles, CA	ESPN	W 45–24	61,725
November 5	4:00 p.m.	Oregon^{†}		Los Angeles Memorial Coliseum; Los Angeles, CA	ESPN	W 45–20	74,625
November 12	4:30 p.m.	at No. 4 Washington	No. 20	Husky Stadium; Seattle, WA (College GameDay)	FOX	W 26–13	72,364
November 19	7:30 p.m.	at UCLA	No. 13	Rose Bowl; Pasadena, CA (Victory Bell)	ESPN	W 36–14	71,137
November 26	12:30 p.m.	Notre Dame*	No. 12	Los Angeles Memorial Coliseum; Los Angeles, CA (Jeweled Shillelagh)	ABC	W 45–27	72,402
January 2, 2017	2:00 p.m.	vs. No. 5 Penn State*	No. 9	Rose Bowl; Pasadena, CA (Rose Bowl) (College GameDay)	ESPN	W 52–49	95,128
*Non-conference game; ^{†}Homecoming; Rankings from AP Poll released prior to the game; All times are in Pacific time

== Game summaries ==
=== Alabama ===
	1	2	3	4	Total
#20 Trojans	3	0	3	0	6
#1 Crimson Tide	0	17	21	14	52

- (Q1, 12:33) USC – #39 Matt Boermeester 47 yard Field Goal – USC 3–0
- (Q2, 7:54) ALA – #13 ArDarius Stewart 39 yard pass from #2 Jalen Hurts (#99 Adam Griffith kick) – ALA 7–3
- (Q2, 3:30) ALA – #99 Adam Griffith 29 yard Field Goal – ALA 10–3
- (Q2, 2:48) ALA – #26 Marlon Humphrey 18 yard interception return (#99 Adam Griffith kick) – ALA 17–3
- (Q3, 13:53) ALA – #13 ArDarius Stewart 71 yard pass from #2 Jalen Hurts (#99 Adam Griffith kick) – ALA 24–3
- (Q3, 11:01) ALA – #2 Jalen Hurts 7 yard run, (#99 Adam Griffith kick) – ALA 31–3
- (Q3, 6:00) ALA – #2 Jalen Hurts 6 yard run, (#99 Adam Griffith kick) – ALA 38–3
- (Q3, 2:38) USC – #39 Matt Boermeester 41 yard Field Goal – ALA 38–6
- (Q4, 13:16) ALA – #9 Bo Scarbrough 6 yard run, (#99 Adam Griffith kick) – ALA 45–6
- (Q4, 9:34) ALA – #14 Gehrig Dieter 45 yard pass from #8 Blake Barnett (#99 Adam Griffith kick) – ALA 52–6

=== Utah State ===
	1	2	3	4	Total
Aggies	0	0	7	0	7
Trojans	7	14	10	14	45

- (Q1, 11:55) USC – #9 JuJu Smith-Schuster 3 yard pass from #4 Max Browne, (#39 Matt Boermeester kick) – USC 7–0
- (Q2, 8:08) USC – #80 Deontay Burnett 13 yard pass from #14 Sam Darnold, (#39 Matt Boermeester kick) – USC 14–0
- (Q2, 0:24) USC – #7 Steven Mitchell 2 yard pass from #4 Max Browne, (#39 Matt Boermeester kick) – USC 21–0
- (Q3, 6:43) USC – #39 Matt Boermeester 20 yard Field Goal – USC 24–0
- (Q3, 4:06) USC – #2 Adoree' Jackson 77 yard punt return (#39 Matt Boermeester kick) – USC 31–0
- (Q3, 0:01) UTS – #83 Wyatt Houston 6 yard pass from #2 Kent Myers, (#63 Brock Warren kick) – USC 31–7
- (Q4, 9:50) USC – #9 JuJu Smith-Schuster 15 yard pass from #14 Sam Darnold, (#39 Matt Boermeester kick) – USC 38–7
- (Q4, 2:48) USC – #28 Aca'Cedric Ware 2 yard run, (#39 Matt Boermeester kick) – USC 45–7

=== Stanford ===
	1	2	3	4	Total
Trojans	3	0	7	0	10
#7 Cardinal	7	10	10	0	27

- (Q1, 4:30) STA – #5 Christian McCaffrey 56 yard pass from #17 Ryan Burns, (#34 Conrad Ukropina kick) – STA 7–0
- (Q1, 0:31) USC – #39 Matt Boermeester 47 yard Field Goal – STA 7–3
- (Q2, 9:34) STA – #34 Conrad Ukropina 31 yard Field Goal – STA 10–3
- (Q2, 2:14) STA – #5 Christian McCaffrey 1 yard run – STA 17–3
- (Q3, 11:35) USC – #25 Ronald Jones II 1 yard run, (#39 Matt Boermeester kick) – STA 17–10
- (Q3, 5:46) STA – #34 Conrad Ukropina 42 yard Field Goal – STA 20–10
- (Q3, 3:37) STA – #3 Michael Rector 56 yard run, (#34 Conrad Ukropina kick) – STA 27–10

=== Utah ===
	1	2	3	4	Total
Trojans	7	10	7	3	27
#24 Utes	7	3	7	14	31

- (Q1, 7:26) UTA – #3 Troy Williams 10 yard run, (#39 Andy Phillips kick) – UTA 7–0
- (Q1, 7:19) USC – #2 Adoree' Jackson 100 yard kick return (#39 Matt Boermeester kick) – USC 7–7
- (Q2, 6:48) UTA – #39 Andy Phillips 36 yard Field Goal – UTA 10–7
- (Q2, 4:48) USC – #22 Justin Davis 14 yard run, (#39 Matt Boermeester kick) – USC 14–10
- (Q2, 0:40) USC – #39 Matt Boermeester 32 yard Field Goal – USC 17–10
- (Q3, 9:54) USC – #14 Sam Darnold 8 yard run, (#39 Matt Boermeester kick) – USC 24–10
- (Q3, 5:02) UTA – #54 Isaac Asiata recovered fumble, (#39 Andy Phillips kick) – USC 24–17
- (Q4, 15:00) USC – #39 Matt Boermeester 43 yard Field Goal – USC 27–17
- (Q4, 9:54) UTA – #11 Raelon Singleton 11 yard pass from #3 Troy Williams, (#39 Andy Phillips kick) – USC 27–24
- (Q4, 0:16) UTA – #12 Tim Patrick 11 yard pass from #3 Troy Williams, (#39 Andy Phillips kick) – UTA 31–27

=== Arizona State ===
	1	2	3	4	Total
Sun Devils	6	0	0	14	20
Trojans	7	20	14	0	41

- (Q1, 10:00) ASU – #5 Zane Gonzalez 40 yard Field Goal – ASU 3–0
- (Q1, 4:38) USC – #9 JuJu Smith-Schuster 5 yard pass from #14 Sam Darnold, (#39 Matt Boermeester kick) – USC 7–3
- (Q1, 0:45) ASU – #5 Zane Gonzalez 34 yard Field Goal – USC 7–6
- (Q2, 10:03) USC – #9 JuJu Smith-Schuster 3 yard pass from #14 Sam Darnold, (#39 Matt Boermeester kick) – USC 14–6
- (Q2, 4:45) USC – #39 Matt Boermeester 49 yard Field Goal – USC 17–6
- (Q2, 2:41) USC – #22 Justin Davis 37 yard run, (#39 Matt Boermeester kick) – USC 24–6
- (Q2, 0:25) USC – #39 Matt Boermeester 46 yard Field Goal – USC 27–6
- (Q3, 11:27) USC – #9 JuJu Smith-Schuster 67 yard pass from #14 Sam Darnold, (#39 Matt Boermeester kick) – USC 34–6
- (Q3, 8:27) USC – #14 Sam Darnold 3 yard run, (#39 Matt Boermeester kick) – USC 41–6
- (Q4, 8:45) ASU – #80 Raymond Epps 13 yard pass from #2 Brady White, (#5 Zane Gonzalez kick) – USC 41–13
- (Q4, 2:00) ASU – #22 Nick Ralston 10 yard run, (#5 Zane Gonzalez kick) – USC 41–20

=== Colorado ===
	1	2	3	4	Total
#21 Buffaloes	0	0	7	10	17
Trojans	7	7	0	7	21

- (Q1, 3:38) USC – #88 Daniel Imatorbhebhe 32 yard pass from #14 Sam Darnold, (#39 Matt Boermeester kick) – USC 7–0
- (Q2, 3:54) USC – #82 Tyler Petite 11 yard pass from #14 Sam Darnold, (#39 Matt Boermeester kick) – USC 14–0
- (Q3, 11:34) COL – #23 Phillip Lindsay 67 yard pass from #4 Bryce Bobo, (#49 Davis Price kick) – USC 14–7
- (Q4, 10:26) COL – #4 Bryce Bobo 12 yard pass from #12 Steven Montez, (#49 Davis Price kick) – USC 14–14
- (Q4, 8:34) USC – #82 Tyler Petite 8 yard pass from #14 Sam Darnold, (#39 Matt Boermeester kick) – USC 21–14
- (Q4, 4:55) COL – #49 Davis Price 42 yard Field Goal – USC 21–17

=== Arizona ===
	1	2	3	4	Total
Trojans	14	20	7	7	48
Arizona	7	0	0	7	14

- (Q1, 10:34) USC – #25 Ronald Jones II 5 yard run, (#39 Matt Boermeester kick) – USC 7–0
- (Q1, 5:44) ARI – #14 Khalil Tate 3 yard run, (#30 Josh Pollack kick) – USC 7–7
- (Q1, 0:13) USC – #80 Deontay Burnett 11 yard pass from #14 Sam Darnold, (#39 Matt Boermeester kick) – USC 14–7
- (Q2, 13:50) USC – #88 Daniel Imatorbhebhe 32 yard pass from #14 Sam Darnold, (#39 Matt Boermeester kick) – USC 21–7
- (Q2, 4:14) USC – #9 JuJu Smith-Schuster 3 yard pass from #14 Sam Darnold – USC 27–7
- (Q2, 0:34) USC – #9 JuJu Smith-Schuster 39 yard pass from #14 Sam Darnold, (#39 Matt Boermeester kick) – USC 34–7
- (Q3, 10:37) USC – #9 JuJu Smith-Schuster 46 yard pass from #14 Sam Darnold, (#39 Matt Boermeester kick) – USC 41–7
- (Q4, 13:16) ARI – #10 Samajie Grant 7 yard pass from #15 Matt Morin, (#30 Josh Pollack kick) – USC 41–14
- (Q4, 11:38) USC – #28 Aca'Cedric Ware 21 yard run, (#39 Matt Boermeester kick) – USC 48–7

=== California ===
	1	2	3	4	Total
Golden Bears	0	10	7	7	24
Trojans	14	14	14	3	45

- (Q1, 10:00) USC – #1 Darreus Rogers 3 yard pass from #14 Sam Darnold, (#39 Matt Boermeester kick) – USC 7–0
- (Q1, 4:34) USC – #25 Ronald Jones II 16 yard pass from #14 Sam Darnold, (#39 Matt Boermeester kick) – USC 14–0
- (Q2, 12:13) USC – #80 Deontay Burnett 13 yard pass from #14 Sam Darnold, (#39 Matt Boermeester kick) – USC 21–0
- (Q2, 08:04) CAL – #5 Tre Watson 22 yard pass from #7 Davis Webb, (#9 Matt Anderson kick) – USC 21–7
- (Q2, 1:54) CAL – #9 Matt Anderson 27 yard Field Goal – USC 21–10
- (Q2, 0:35) USC – #1 Darreus Rogers 20 yard pass from #14 Sam Darnold, (#39 Matt Boermeester kick) – USC 28–10
- (Q3, 9:25) CAL – #7 Davis Webb 1 yard run, (#9 Matt Anderson kick) – USC 28–17
- (Q3, 7:10) USC – #25 Ronald Jones II 37 yard run, (#39 Matt Boermeester kick) – USC 35–17
- (Q3, 1:18) USC – #88 Daniel Imatorbhebhe 17 yard pass from #14 Sam Darnold, (#39 Matt Boermeester kick) – USC 42–17
- (Q4, 13:22) CAL – #1 Melquise Stovall 16 yard pass from #7 Davis Webb, (#9 Matt Anderson kick) – USC 42–24
- (Q4, 2:42) USC – #39 Matt Boermeester 32 yard Field Goal – USC 45–24

=== Oregon ===
	1	2	3	4	Total
Ducks	6	0	7	7	20
Trojans	17	7	14	7	45

- (Q1, 12:18) USC – #39 Matt Boermeester 35 yard Field Goal – USC 3–0
- (Q1, 8:37) USC – #25 Ronald Jones II 23 yard run, (#39 Matt Boermeester kick) – USC 10–0
- (Q1, 5:25) USC – #25 Ronald Jones II 3 yard run, (#39 Matt Boermeester kick) – USC 17–0
- (Q1, 0:15) ORE – #6 Charles Nelson 25 yard run – USC 17–6
- (Q2, 0:30) USC – #80 Deontay Burnett 3 yard pass from #14 Sam Darnold, (#39 Matt Boermeester kick) – USC 24–6
- (Q3, 13:51) USC – #25 Ronald Jones II 66 yard run, (#39 Matt Boermeester kick) – USC 31–6
- (Q3, 9:57) ORE – #85 Pharaoh Brown 5 yard pass from #10 Justin Herbert, (#41 Aidan Schneider kick) – USC 31–13
- (Q3, 2:47) USC – #48 Taylor McNamara 8 yard pass from #14 Sam Darnold, (#39 Matt Boermeester kick) – USC 38–13
- (Q4, 11:42) USC – #25 Ronald Jones II 1 yard run, (#39 Matt Boermeester kick) – USC 45–13
- (Q4, 5:41) ORE – #9 Dakota Prukop 15 yard run, (#41 Aidan Schneider kick) – USC 45–20

=== Washington ===
	1	2	3	4	Total
#20 Trojans	3	14	0	9	26
#4 Huskies	3	3	7	0	13

- (Q1, 4:03) WASH – #48 Cameron Van Winkle 43 yard Field Goal – WASH 3–0
- (Q1, 0:46) USC – #39 Matt Boermeester 38 yard Field Goal – USC 3–3
- (Q2, 9:00) USC – #1 Darreus Rogers 13 yard pass from #14 Sam Darnold, (#39 Matt Boermeester kick) – USC 10–3
- (Q2, 2:39) WASH – #48 Cameron Van Winkle 39 yard Field Goal – USC 10–6
- (Q2, 0:34) USC – #25 Ronald Jones II 4 yard run, (#39 Matt Boermeester kick) – USC 17–6
- (Q3, 8:33) USC – #1 John Ross 70 yard pass from #3 Jake Browning, (#48 Cameron Van Winkle kick) – USC 17–13
- (Q4, 13:39) USC – #88 Daniel Imatorbhebhe 8 yard pass from #14 Sam Darnold, (#39 Matt Boermeester kick) – USC 24–13
- (Q4, 0:58) USC – Team Safety – USC 26–13

=== UCLA ===
	1	2	3	4	Total
#13 Trojans	7	16	7	6	36
Bruins	7	7	0	0	14

- (Q1, 13:41) UCLA – #2 Jordan Lasley 56 yard pass from #12 Mike Fafaul, (#17 JJ Molson kick) – UCLA 7–0
- (Q1, 9:54) USC – #25 Ronald Jones II 1 yard run, (#39 Matt Boermeester kick) – USC 7–7
- (Q2, 13:34) UCLA – #2 Jordan Lasley 7 yard pass from #12 Mike Fafaul, (#17 JJ Molson kick) – UCLA 14–7
- (Q2, 11:19) USC – #25 Ronald Jones II 60 yard run, (#39 Matt Boermeester kick) – USC 14–14
- (Q2, 8:18) USC – #13 De'Quan Hampton 31 yard pass from #14 Sam Darnold – USC 20–14
- (Q2, 0:12) USC – #39 Matt Boermeester 30 yard Field Goal – USC 23–14
- (Q3, 10:01) USC – #13 De'Quan Hampton 6 yard pass from #14 Sam Darnold, (#39 Matt Boermeester kick) – USC 30–14
- (Q4, 13:38) USC – #39 Matt Boermeester 32 yard Field Goal – USC 33–14
- (Q4, 7:01) USC – #39 Matt Boermeester 25 yard Field Goal – USC 36–14

=== Notre Dame ===
	1	2	3	4	Total
Fighting Irish	7	0	14	6	27
#12 Trojans	10	14	14	7	45

- (Q1, 10:22) USC – #39 Matt Boermeester 37 yard Field Goal USC 3–0
- (Q1, 9:51) ND – #14 DeShone Kizer 1 Yd Run (Justin Yoon Kick) ND 7–3
- (Q1, 7:08) USC – #25 Ronald Jones II 51 yard run, (#39 Matt Boermeester kick) USC 10–7
- (Q2, 1:24) USC – #2 Adoree' Jackson 55 Yd Punt Return (Matt Boermeester Kick) USC 17–7
- (Q2, 1:07) USC – #27 Ajene Harris 33 Yd Interception Return (Matt Boermeester Kick) USC 24–7
- (Q3, 10:08) ND – #10 Chris Finke 14 Yd pass from DeShone Kizer (Justin Yoon Kick) USC 24–14
- (Q3, 7:41) USC – #2 Adoree' Jackson 52 Yd pass from Sam Darnold (Matt Boermeester Kick) USC 31–14
- (Q3, 1:41) ND – #29 Kevin Stepherson 29 Yd pass from DeShone Kizer (Justin Yoon Kick) USC 31–21
- (Q3, 0:47) USC – #2 Adoree' Jackson 97 Yd Kickoff Return (Matt Boermeester Kick) USC 38–21
- (Q4, 9:40) USC – #9 Juju Smith-Schuster 2 Yd pass from Sam Darnold (Matt Boermeester Kick) USC 45–21
- (Q4, 1:02) ND – #6 Equanimeous St. Brown 15 Yd pass from Malik Zaire (Two-Point Run Conversion Failed) USC 45–27

=== Penn State (Rose Bowl) ===
	1	2	3	4	Total
#9 USC	13	14	8	17	52
#5 Penn State	0	21	28	0	49

- (Q1, 10:39) USC – #80 Deontay Burnett 26 yard pass from #14 Sam Darnold, (#39 Matt Boermeester kick) – USC 7–0
- (Q1, 4:46) USC – #39 Matt Boermeester 22 yard Field Goal – USC 10–0
- (Q1, 9:26) USC – #39 Matt Boermeester 44 yard Field Goal – USC 13–0
- (Q2, 11:50) PSU – #26 Saquon Barkley 24 yard run, (#95 Tyler Davis kick) – USC 13–7
- (Q2, 10:15) USC – #80 Deontay Burnett 3 yard pass from #14 Sam Darnold, (#39 Matt Boermeester kick) – USC 20–7
- (Q2, 8:49) PSU – #12 Chris Godwin 30 yard pass from #9 Trace McSorley, (#95 Tyler Davis kick) – USC 20–14
- (Q2, 6:20) USC – #1 Darreus Rogers 3 yard pass from #14 Sam Darnold, (#39 Matt Boermeester kick) – USC 27–14
- (Q2, 1:00) PSU – #88 Mike Gesicki 11 yard pass from #9 Trace McSorley, (#95 Tyler Davis kick) – USC 27–21
- (Q3, 13:22) PSU – #26 Saquon Barkley 79 yard run, (#95 Tyler Davis kick) – PSU 28–27
- (Q3, 11:38) PSU – #12 Chris Godwin 72 yard pass from #9 Trace McSorley, (#95 Tyler Davis kick) – PSU 35–27
- (Q3, 10:31) PSU – #9 Trace McSorley 3 yard run, (#95 Tyler Davis kick) – PSU 42–27
- (Q3, 6:54) USC – #9 JuJu Smith-Schuster 13 yard pass from #14 Sam Darnold, (2pts Good) – PSU 42–35
- (Q3, 2:00) PSU – #26 Saquon Barkley 7 yard pass from #9 Trace McSorley, (#95 Tyler Davis kick) – PSU 49–35
- (Q4, 8:19) USC – #4 Ronald Jones II 3 yard run, (#39 Matt Boermeester kick) – PSU 49–42
- (Q4, 1:27) USC – #80 Deontay Burnett 27 yard pass from #14 Sam Darnold, (#39 Matt Boermeester kick) – USC 49–49
- (Q4, 0:00) USC – #39 Matt Boermeester 46 yard Field Goal – USC 52–49

== Rankings ==
Ranking movements Legend: ██ Increase in ranking ██ Decrease in ranking — = Not ranked RV = Received votes
	Week															
Poll	Pre	1	2	3	4	5	6	7	8	9	10	11	12	13	14	Final
AP	20	—	—	—	—	—	—	RV	RV	RV	RV	15	12	10	9	3
Coaches	17	RV	—	—	—	RV	RV	RV	RV	RV	RV	19	12	11	9	5
CFP	Not released									—	20	13	12	11	9	Not released

== Statistics ==
=== Team ===
As of November 20, 2016.

Team statistics
	USC	Opponents
Scoring & Efficiency
Points	350	239
Total Time Possession	5:42:57	5:17:03
Average Time Per Game	31:51	28:09
First Downs	266	203
Rushing	117	78
Passing	132	105
Penalty	17	20
3rd–Down Conversions	72/151	58/162
4th–Down Conversions	7/14	13/23
Red Zone Scoring	40/50	25/31
Red Zone Touchdowns	31/50	19/31
Penalties – Yards	82–723	51–468
Yards Per Game	65.7	42.5
Offense
Total Offense	5,215	3,900
Total Plays	813	749
Average Plays Per Game	74	68
Average Yards Per Play	6.4	5.2
Average Per Yards Game	474.1	354.5
Rushing Yards	2,280	1,450
Rushing Attempts	434	378
Average Per Rush	5.3	3.8
Average Per Game	207.3	131.8
Rushing TDs	16	12
Passing yards	2,935	2,450
Comp–Att	252–379	211–371
Comp %	66.5	56.9
Average Per Pass	7.7	6.6
Average Per Catch	11.6	11.6
Average Per Game	266.8	222.7
Passing TDs	26	17
Interceptions	10	10
Defense
INT Returns: # – Yards	10–45	10–135
INT Touchdowns	0	1
Fumbles Recovered: # – Yards	5–26	8–34
Fumble recovery Touchdowns	0	0
QB Sacks: # – Yards	19–138	11–77
Touchdowns	0	1
Safeties	1	0
Special teams
Kickoffs: # – Yards	69–4,390	52–3,004
Average Yards Per Kick	63.6	57.8
Net Kick Average	42.4	37.1
Touchbacks	36	17
Onside Kicks: # – Recovered	0–0	0–0
Punts: # – Yards	40–1,509	58–2,385
Average Yards Per Punt	37.7	41.1
Net Punt Average	36.3	34.1
Touchbacks	2	4
Kickoff Returns: # – Yards	29–652	30–567
Average Yards Per Return	22.5	18.9
Kickoff return Touchdowns	1	0
Punt Returns: # – Yards	21–329	4–18
Average Yards Per Return	15.7	4.5
Punt return Touchdowns	1	0
Field Goals: # – Attempts	14–19	10–13
Longest Field Goal: Yards	49	43
PAT: # – Attempts	42–43	29–30

Non-conference opponents

	1	2	3	4	Total
USC	10	14	13	14	51
All opponents	0	17	28	14	59

Pac-12 opponents

	1	2	3	4	Total
USC	79	108	70	42	299
Pac-12 opponents	43	33	45	59	180

=== Offense ===
Passing statistics
#	NAME	POS	RAT	CMP	ATT	YDS	AVG	CMP%	TD	INT	LONG
14	Sam Darnold	QB	162.4	194	284	2,428	12.5	68.3	24	8	67
4	Max Browne	QB	112.2	58	92	507	8.7	63.0	2	2	38
19	Matt Fink	QB	0	0	0	0	0	0	0	0	0
10	Jalen Greene	QB-WR	0	0	1	0	0	0	0	0	0
–	Team	–	0	0	1	0	0	0	0	0	0
	TOTALS		148.9	252	379	2,935	11.6	66.5	26	10	67
	OPPONENTS		122.1	211	371	2,450	11.6	56.9	17	10	71

Rushing statistics
#	NAME	POS	CAR	YDS	AVG	LONG	TD
25	Ronald Jones II	TB	141	893	6.3	66	10
22	Justin Davis	TB	94	528	5.6	50	2
28	Aca'Cedric Ware	TB	76	389	5.1	37	2
16	Dominic Davis	TB	18	130	7.2	85	0
26	James Toland IV	TB	13	69	5.3	10	0
–	Team	–	9	−11	−1.2	0	0
14	Sam Darnold	QB	54	214	4.0	18	2
4	Max Browne	QB	9	−23	−2.6	17	0
10	Jalen Greene	QB-WR	4	12	3.0	20	0
9	JuJu Smith-Schuster	WR	4	25	6.2	20	0
80	Deontay Burnett	WR	3	31	10.3	15	0
2	Adoree' Jackson	CB	4	37	9.2	17	0
24	Ajene Harris	CB	1	14	14.0	14	0
36	Chris Tilbey	P	1	−17	−17.0	−17	0
46	Wyatt Schmidt	H	1	−8	−8.0	−8	0
7	Steven Mitchell Jr.	WR	2	−3	−1.5	2	0
	TOTALS		434	2,280	5.3	85	16
	OPPONENTS		378	1,450	3.8	73	12

Receiving statistics
#	NAME	POS	REC	YDS	AVG	LONG	TD
9	JuJu Smith-Schuster	WR	59	758	12.8	67	8
1	Darreus Rogers	WR	47	605	12.9	46	3
80	Deontay Burnett	WR	38	424	11.2	40	4
7	Steven Mitchell	WR	24	226	9.4	23	1
13	De'Quan Hampton	WR	7	73	10.4	31	2
6	Michael Pittman Jr.	WR	6	82	13.7	21	0
10	Jalen Greene	WR-QB	6	73	12.2	15	0
15	Isaac Whitney	WR	2	24	12.0	17	0
17	Josh Imatorbhebhe	WR	0	0	0.0	0	0
21	Tyler Vaughns	WR	0	0	0.0	0	0
81	Trevon Sidney	WR	0	0	0.0	0	0
85	Velus Jones Jr.	WR	0	0	0.0	0	0
48	Taylor McNamara	TE	10	93	9.3	27	1
82	Tyler Petite	TE	10	156	15.6	38	2
88	Daniel Imatorbhebhe	TE	14	219	15.6	37	4
86	Cary Angeline	TE	0	0	0.0	0	0
25	Ronald Jones II	TB	9	73	8.1	16	1
22	Justin Davis	TB	13	98	7.5	27	0
16	Dominic Davis	TB	4	19	4.8	8	0
28	Aca'Cedric Ware	TB	3	9	3.0	6	0
73	Zach Banner	OT	0	3	0.0	0	0
	TOTALS		252	2,935	11.6	67	26
	OPPONENTS		211	2,450	11.6	71	17

=== Defense ===
Defense statistics
#	NAME	POS	SOLO	AST	TOT	TFL-YDS	SACK-YDS	INT-YDS	BU	PD	QBH	FR-YDS	FF	BLK	SAF	TD
44	Malik Dorton	DT	5	4	9	1.5–16	1.0–15	0–0	1	1	–	0–0	–	–	–	–
53	Kevin Scott	DT	0	0	0	0.0–0	0.0–0	0–0	–	–	–	0–0	–	–	–	–
62	Khaliel Rodgers	DT	0	0	0	0.0–0	0.0–0	0–0	–	–	–	0–0	–	–	–	–
91	Noah Jefferson	DT	2	1	3	0.0–0	0.0–0	0–0	–	–	–	0–0	–	–	–	–
92	Jacob Daniel	DT	5	1	6	0.0–0	0.0–0	0–0	–	–	–	0–0	–	–	–	–
93	Liam Jimmons	DT	0	0	0	0.0–0	0.0–0	0–0	–	–	–	0–0	–	–	–	–
94	Rasheem Green	DT	17	27	44	5.0–28	4.5–27	0–0	4	4	1	0–0	1	2	–	–
95	Kenny Bigelow Jr.	DT	0	0	0	0.0–0	0.0–0	0–0	–	–	–	0–0	–	–	–	–
96	Stevie Tu'ikolovatu	DT	20	20	40	1.5–3	0.0–0	0–0	1	1	–	0–0	–	–	–	–
98	Josh Fatu	DT	12	7	19	1.5–5	1.0–5	0–0	–	–	–	0–0	–	–	–	–
40	Jabari Ruffin	DE	2	0	2	1.0–3	0.0–0	0–0	–	–	–	0–0	–	–	–	–
45	Porter Gustin	DE	37	19	56	10.5–44	4.0–31	0–0	4	4	1	0–0	–	–	–	–
89	Christian Rector	DE	2	3	5	0.0–0	0.0–0	0–0	–	–	–	0–0	–	–	–	–
90	Connor Murphy	DE	4	0	4	0.0–0	0.0–0	0–0	–	–	–	1–0	–	–	–	–
99	Oluwole Betiku Jr.	DE	0	0	0	0.0–0	0.0–0	0–0	–	–	–	0–0	–	–	–	–
10	Chris Houston Jr.	LB	10	3	13	0.0–0	0.0–0	0–0	–	–	–	0–0	–	–	–	–
18	Quinton Powell	LB	10	3	13	2.0–7	1.0–6	0–0	1	1	–	0–0	–	–	–	–
19	Michael Hutchings	LB	30	29	59	5.0–21	2.0–15	0–0	1	1	–	0–0	–	–	–	–
34	Olajuwon Tucker	LB	6	3	9	0.0–0	0.0–0	0–0	–	–	–	0–0	–	–	–	–
35	Cameron Smith	LB	40	29	69	6.0–17	1.0–6	0–0	4	4	–	1–0	1	–	–	–
42	Uchenna Nwosu	LB	22	21	43	7.0–32	2.5–11	0–0	4	4	2	0–0	1	–	–	–
56	Jordan Iosefa	LB	6	3	9	0.0–0	0.0–0	0–0	–	–	–	0–0	–	–	–	–
1	Jack Jones	CB	10	2	12	0.0–0	0.0–0	0–0	1	1	–	0–0	–	–	–	–
2	Adoree' Jackson	CB	41	8	49	2.0–4	0.0–0	4–0	9	13	–	2–26	–	–	–	–
8	Iman Marshall	CB	32	11	43	3.0–5	0.0–0	2–12	7	9	–	0–0	–	–	–	–
14	Isaiah Langley	CB	6	1	7	0.0–0	0.0–0	0–0	–	–	–	0–0	–	–	–	–
17	Keyshawn 'Pie' Young	CB	0	0	0	0.0–0	0.0–0	0–0	–	–	–	0–0	–	–	–	–
23	Jonathan Lockett	CB	11	6	17	0.5–1	0.0–0	1–0	3	4	–	0–0	–	–	–	–
27	Ajene Harris	CB	12	9	21	1.5–3	0.0–0	1–33	4	5	–	1–0	1	–	–	–
4	Chris Hawkins	S	37	4	41	4.0–16	1.0–10	0–0	2	2	1	0–0	2	–	–	–
7	Marvel Tell	S	24	15	39	2.0–7	0.0–0	1–0	2	3	–	0–0	–	–	–	–
21	Jamel Cook	S	0	0	0	0.0–0	0.0–0	0–0	–	–	–	0–0	–	–	–	–
22	Leon McQuay	S	24	16	40	4.0–19	1.0–12	1–0	4	5	–	0–0	–	–	–	–
24	John Plattenburg	S	1	0	1	0.0–0	0.0–0	0–0	–	–	–	0–0	–	–	–	–
28	C.J. Pollard	S	0	0	0	0.0–0	0.0–0	0–0	–	–	–	0–0	–	–	–	–
30	Ykili Ross	S	2	0	2	0.0–0	0.0–0	0–0	1	1	–	0–0	–	–	–	–
37	Matt Lopes	S	3	1	4	0.0–0	0.0–0	0–0	–	–	–	0–0	–	–	–	–
–	Team	–	1	0	1	1.0–2	0.0–0	0–0	–	–	–	0–0	–	–	1	–
6	Michael Pittman Jr.	WR	4	0	4	0.0–0	0.0–0	0–0	–	–	–	0–0	1	1	–	–
9	JuJu Smith-Schuster	WR	2	0	2	0.0–0	0.0–0	0–0	–	–	–	0–0	–	–	–	–
14	Sam Darnold	QB	2	0	2	0.0–0	0.0–0	0–0	–	–	–	0–0	–	–	–	–
80	Deontay Burnett	WR	2	0	2	0.0–0	0.0–0	0–0	–	–	–	0–0	–	–	–	–
26	James Toland IV	TB	2	0	2	0.0–0	0.0–0	0–0	–	–	–	0–0	–	–	–	–
1	Darreus Rogers	WR	1	0	1	0.0–0	0.0–0	0–0	–	–	–	0–0	–	–	–	–
28	Aca'Cedric Ware	TB	1	0	1	0.0–0	0.0–0	0–0	–	–	–	0–0	–	–	–	–
60	Viane Talamaivao	OG	1	0	1	0.0–0	0.0–0	0–0	–	–	–	0–0	–	–	–	–
30	Matt Boermeester	K	1	0	1	0.0–0	0.0–0	0–0	–	–	–	0–0	–	–	–	–
	TOTAL		450	246	696	59–233	19–138	10–45	53	63	5	5–26	7	3	1	0
	OPPONENTS		510	270	780	51–182	11–77	10–135	40	50	5	8–34	9	0	0	1

Key: POS: Position, SOLO: Solo Tackles, AST: Assisted Tackles, TOT: Total Tackles, TFL: Tackles-for-loss, SACK: Quarterback Sacks, INT: Interceptions, BU: Passes Broken Up, PD: Passes Defended, QBH: Quarterback Hits, FR: Fumbles Recovered, FF: Forced Fumbles, BLK: Kicks or Punts Blocked, SAF: Safeties, TD : Touchdown

=== Special teams ===
Kicking statistics
#	NAME	POS	XPM	XPA	XP%	FGM	FGA	FG%	1–19	20–29	30–39	40–49	50+	LNG	PTS
39	Matt Boermeester	PK	42	43	97.7	14	19	73.7	0/0	2/2	6/7	6/8	0/2	49	84
49	Michael Brown	PK	0	0	0	0	0	0.0	0/0	0/0	0/0	0/0	0/0	0	0
	TOTALS		42	43	97.7	14	19	73.7	0/0	2/2	6/7	6/8	0/2	49	84
	OPPONENTS		29	30	96.6	10	13	76.9	0/0	2/2	4/6	4/5	0/0	43	59

Kickoff statistics
#	NAME	POS	KICKS	YDS	AVG	TB	OB
39	Matt Boermeester	PK	69	4,390	63.6	36	3
49	Michael Brown	PK	0	0	0	0	0
	TOTALS		69	4,390	63.6	36	3
	OPPONENTS		52	3,004	57.8	17	3

Punting statistics
#	NAME	POS	PUNTS	YDS	AVG	LONG	TB	I–20	50+	BLK
36	Chris Tilbey	P	40	1,509	37.7	53	2	16	2	0
46	Reid Budrovich	P	0	0	0	0	0	0	0	0
–	Team	–	0	0	0.0	0	0	0	0	0
	TOTALS		40	1,509	37.7	53	2	16	2	0
	OPPONENTS		58	2,385	41.1	67	4	21	9	1

Kick return statistics
#	NAME	POS	RTNS	YDS	AVG	TD	LNG
2	Adoree' Jackson	CB	18	510	28.3	1	100
7	Steven Mitchell	WR	5	91	18.2	0	32
1	Jack Jones	CB	3	31	10.3	0	13
6	Michael Pittman Jr.	WR	2	13	6.5	0	12
35	Cameron Smith	ILB	1	7	7.5	0	7
	TOTALS		29	652	22.5	1	100
	OPPONENTS		30	567	18.9	0	31

Punt return statistics
#	NAME	POS	RTNS	YDS	AVG	TD	LONG
2	Adoree' Jackson	CB	16	236	14.8	1	77
6	Michael Pittman Jr.	WR	2	63	31.5	0	35
80	Deontay Burnett	WR	2	20	10.0	0	15
7	Steven Mitchell Jr.	WR	1	1	1.0	0	1
18	Quinton Powell	LB	0	9	0.0	0	9
	TOTALS		21	329	15.7	1	77
	OPPONENTS		4	18	4.5	0	14

== Awards and honors ==
=== Coaches ===
Clay Helton – Head Coach

- Paul "Bear" Bryant Award (Coach of the Year) : Finalist
- FWAA First Year Coach of Year

=== Offense ===
Sam Darnold – QB – (redshirt) Freshman

- Archie Griffin Award (most valuable player) : Winner
- Pac-12 Offensive Freshman of the Year
- Manning Award (quarterback) : Finalist
- Davey O'Brien Award (quarterback) : Semi-Finalist

JuJu Smith-Schuster – WR – Junior

- POLY POY (Polynesian College Football Player of the Year) : Finalist

=== Defense ===
Adoree' Jackson – CB – Junior

- Jim Thorpe Award (defensive back) : Winner
- Pac-12 Defensive Player of The Year
- Paul Hornung Award (most versatile player) : Finalist

=== College Sports Madness All-American Team ===
- First team

Zach Banner – OT – Senior (164th)
Adoree' Jackson – CB – Junior (165th)

- Third Team

Adoree' Jackson – KR & PR – Junior

=== All-Pac-12 Individual Awards ===
- Offensive freshman of the year

Sam Darnold – QB – (redshirt) Freshman

- Defensive player of the year

Adoree' Jackson – CB – Junior

=== PAC-12 All-Conference Team ===
- First team

Zach Banner – OT – Senior
Chad Wheeler – OT – Senior
Adoree' Jackson – CB & PR – Junior

- Second team

Ronald Jones II – TB – Sophomore
JuJu Smith-Schuster – WR – Junior
Damien Mama – OG – Junior
Stevie Tu'ikolovatu – DT – Senior
Cameron Smith – ILB – Sophomore

- Honorable mention

Sam Darnold – QB – (redshirt) Freshman
Darreus Rogers – WR – Senior
Daniel Imatorbhebhe – TE – (redshirt) Freshman
Rasheem Green – DT – Sophomore
Porter Gustin – DE – Sophomore
Michael Hutchings – ILB – Senior
Iman Marshall – CB – Sophomore
Chris Hawkins – S – Junior
Leon McQuay III – S – Senior

=== PAC-12 All-Freshman Team ===
- First team

Sam Darnold – QB – (redshirt) Freshman
Daniel Imatorbhebhe – TE – (redshirt) Freshman

=== PAC-12 All-Academic Team ===
- Honorable mention

Sam Darnold – QB – (redshirt) Freshman
Max Browne – QB – (redshirt) Junior
Matt Boermeester – K – (redshirt) Junior
Chris Tilbey – P – (redshirt) Sophomore

=== USA Today Sports Freshman All-America Team ===
- Second team

Adoree' Jackson – RET – Junior

=== FWAA Freshman All-America Team ===
Sam Darnold – QB – (redshirt) Freshman

== Notes ==
- January 4, 2016 – Tyson Helton, Neil Callaway Officially Join USC Football Staff.
- January 4, 2016 – Keanu Saleapaga De-Commits from USC Football.
- January 8, 2016 – John Baxter Returns to Coach USC Special Teams.
- January 10, 2016 – Marques Tuiasosopo Leaves USC to be UCLA QB Coach.
- January 11, 2016 – Usc officially hires defensive coordinator Clancy Pendergast.
- January 12, 2016 – Peter Sirmon Leaving USC to be Mississippi State DC.
- January 14, 2016 – USC hires Ronnie Bradford to Coach Defensive Backs.
- January 18, 2016 – Tommie robinson returning to usc to coach tailbacks and run game coordinator.
- January 22, 2016 – Connor Spears Steps Away From USC Football Team.
- January 22, 2016 – Velus Jones flips from USC to Oklahoma.
- January 23, 2016 – Velus Jones Announces Re-Commitment to USC from Oklahoma.
- January 23, 2016 – Keyshon Camp De-Commits From USC.
- January 26, 2016 – Kenechi Udeze Hired as USC Defensive Line Coach.
- February 3, 2016 – Jack Jones Commits to USC Football on Signing Day.
- February 3, 2016 – USC Finishes With Top 10 Signing Day 2016 Recruiting Class.
- February 4, 2016 – Tee Martin Named 247Sports 2016 Recruiter of the Year.
- February 5, 2016 – QB Matt Corral Commits for 2018.
- February 12, 2016 – USC to NFL: Seven Trojans Invited to 2016 NFL Combine.
- March 2, 2016 – Caleb Wilson to Transfer From USC to UCLA.
- March 26, 2016 – USC Football: Kenny Bigelow Has Torn ACL, Will Miss 2016 Season.
- April 1, 2016 – Scott Felix Loses NCAA Appeal, Ending USC Football Career.
- April 5, 2016 – Thomas Graham De-Commits From USC.
- April 6, 2016 – Bo Calvert Commits to the Trojans.
- April 8, 2016 – LB Raymond Scott Commits to Trojans for 2018.
- April 13, 2016 – USC Hires Lynn Swann as New Athletic Director.
- April 22, 2016 – USC Football Players Rap While Stuck in an Elevator (Video).
- April 23, 2016 – Juliano Falaniko Commits to Trojans.
- May 19, 2016 – 3-Star LB Daniel Green Commits.
- May 19, 2016 – USC Football Boasts Most Wins Over Ranked Opponents In CFB.
- June 8, 2016 – Nation's No. 2 Center Commits to USC over Michigan.
- June 10, 2016 – Andrew Vorhees Commits to 2017 USC Recruiting Class.
- June 14, 2016 – USC Offensive Line is Nation's 2nd Most Experienced.
- June 16, 2016 – Utah Defensive tackle Steve Tu’ikolovatu Transfers To USC Football.
- June 17, 2016 – Three Future Contests With Fresno State Announced.
- June 20, 2016 – C.J. Miller, 3-Star Safety, Commits to USC Football.
- June 27, 2016 – Erik Krommenhoek, 3-Star TE, Commits to USC Football.
- July 3, 2016 – Adoree’ Jackson Doesn't Qualify for 2016 Olympic Games in Rio.
- July 11, 2016 – 5 Trojans Make SI's Top 100 College Football Players of 2016.
- July 11, 2016 – New USC Football Jerseys Unveiled for 2016 Season.
- July 12, 2016 – USC vs. Alabama: Trojans to Wear White as Designated Road Team.
- July 13, 2016 – Unwrapping the New 2016 USC Football Media Guide.
- July 15, 2016 – Bubba Bolden Decommitted From USC Recruiting Class.
- July 19, 2016 – Isaiah Langley Suspended for USC vs. Alabama.
- July 21, 2016 – USC Football Picture Day 2016: Photos, Videos and New Jerseys.
- July 30, 2016 – Wylan Free Commits to 2017 USC Recruiting Class.
- August 2, 2016 – USC Football Ranks No. 5 In All-Time AP Poll.
- August 3, 2016 – Juwan Burgess, 3-Star ATH, Commits to USC Football.
- August 4, 2016 – USC Football Announces Stevie Tu’ikolovatu, 5 New Players for 2016.
- August 5, 2016 – Alijah Vera-Tucker Commits to 2017 USC Recruiting Class.
- August 5, 2016 – Hunter Echols Commits to 2017 USC Recruiting Class.
- August 10, 2016 – Freshman Vavae Malepeai Out 6–8 Weeks.
- August 16, 2016 – Projecting 2016 Starting Lineup After Fall Camp.
- August 16, 2016 – Jacob Lichtenstein, 3-Star DE, Commits to USC Football.
- August 17, 2016 – Tyson Helton and a New Look for USC Offense in 2016.
- August 18, 2016 – Matt Lopes, Reuben Peters, James Toland Awarded Scholarships.
- August 20, 2016 – Max Browne Named USC Starting Quarterback.
- August 20, 2016 – James Lynch, 3-Star DT, Commits To USC Football.
- August 21, 2016 – USC Football Ranked No. 20 In Preseason AP Poll.
- August 21, 2016 – Clay Helton Releases First USC Depth Chart of 2016.
- August 29, 2016 – LB Osa Masina Suspended For Season Opener.
- August 31, 2016 – 2016 USC Football Team Captains Announced.
- September 2, 2016 – Don Hill Sent Home Before USC vs Alabama Game.
- September 3, 2016 – USC vs Alabama Score and Recap: Tide Roll Big Over Trojans.
- September 4, 2016 – Jabari Ruffin Suspended For 1st Half vs Utah State.
- September 6, 2016 – USC Football Drops Out of AP Poll After Alabama Loss.
- September 8, 2016 – Toa Lobendahn Tears ACL Again, Out For Season.
- September 10, 2016 – USC vs Utah Score: Trojans Win Big in Home Opener.
- September 11, 2016 – Chuma Edoga Avoids Suspension For USC vs Stanford.
- September 12, 2016 – Adoree’ Jackson Named Pac-12 Special Teams Player of the Week.
- September 13, 2016 – Osa Masina, Don Hill Suspended From All USC Football Team Activities.
- September 15, 2016 – USC Football Should Use Adoree’ Jackson To Stop Christian McCaffrey.
- September 17, 2016 – USC vs Stanford Final Score: Cardinal Cruise to Victory.
- September 19, 2016 – Sam Darnold Named USC Starting Quarterback vs. Utah.
- September 19, 2016 – Clay Helton's USC Quarterback Change Put Max Browne Out to Dry.
- September 19, 2016 – Clay Helton Picked Sam Darnold as USC Quarterback Too Late.
- September 20, 2016 – Osa Masina, Don Hill Removed From USC Football Roster.
- September 20, 2016 – Freshman EJ Price to Transfer From USC Football Team.
- September 23, 2016 – USC vs Utah Final Score and Recap: Trojans Collapse in Salt Lake.
- September 24, 2016 – USC Football Mistakes From Top To Bottom Exposed vs Utah.
- September 24, 2016 – Justin Davis Joins USC's Illustrious 2,000-Yard Club.
- September 24, 2016 – Clay Helton, USC Need an Unthinkable Turnaround After 1–3 Start.
- September 27, 2016 – Noah Jefferson To Be Held Out Until November.
- October 1, 2016 – USC vs ASU Final Score: Trojans Win a Blowout.
- October 8, 2016 – USC vs Colorado Final Score: Trojans Survive To Down Buffaloes.
- October 14, 2016 – USC Football Has Reason To Look Forward After Back-To-Back Wins.
- October 15, 2016 – USC vs Arizona Score: Trojans Roll Wildcats in a Blowout.
- October 16, 2016 – Steven Mitchell Jr. Out For Season With ACL Tear.
- October 24, 2016 – Adoree’ Jackson Named 2016 Thorpe Award Semifinalist.
- October 27, 2016 – USC vs Cal Score: Trojans Roll Over Bears At Coliseum.
- November 1, 2016 – Max Browne Granted Permission To Seek Transfer From USC Football.
- November 5, 2016 – USC vs Oregon Score: Trojans Blow Out the Ducks.
- November 6, 2016 – Defense Comes Full Circle in Shutdown of Oregon Ducks.
- November 8, 2016 – USC Football Ranked No. 20 In College Football Playoff Rankings.
- November 10, 2016 – Sam Darnold Named Semifinalist for Davey O’Brien Award.
- November 12, 2016 – Redemption on the Line for Clay Helton, USC Football vs. Washington.
- November 12, 2016 – USC vs Washington: Lee Corso Picks Huskies On College Gameday.
- November 12, 2016 – USC vs Washington Score: Trojans Topple the No. 4 Huskies.
- November 13, 2016 – QB Jack Sears Commits To 2017 USC Recruiting Class, Flips From Duke.
- November 13, 2016 – It's Time To Give Clay Helton, USC Football Their Due Praise.
- November 14, 2016 – Sam Darnold Named Pac-12 Player of the Week After USC Win Over UW.
- November 15, 2016 – Clay Helton's USC Football Pulls Massive Upset In Seattle.
- November 15, 2016 – USC Football Jumps To No. 13 In College Football Playoff Rankings.
- November 17, 2016 – Adoree’ Jackson Named Finalist For 2016 Paul Hornung Award.
- November 19, 2016 – USC vs UCLA Score: Trojans Rout Bruins For 7th Straight Win.
- November 20, 2016 – USC Blowout of UCLA Fueled By Pete Carroll Style Run.
- November 21, 2016 – Adoree’ Jackson Named Finalist For Thorpe Award.
- November 22, 2016 – Juju Smith-Schuster Named Finalist For Polynesian Player Of The Year Award.
- November 22, 2016 – USC Football Moves Up To No. 12 In College Football Playoff Ranking.
- November 26, 2016 – Colorado Beats Utah, USC Football Falls Short Of Pac-12 South Title.
- November 26, 2016 – USC vs Notre Dame Score: Trojans Beat Irish, Win 8th-Straight Game.
- November 28, 2016 – Two Return TDs Earn Adoree’ Jackson Pac-12 Player Of The Week Honors.
- November 29, 2016 – Adoree’ Jackson, Sam Darnold Lead USC's 2016 All-Pac-12 Honors.
- November 29, 2016 – Noah Jefferson Reportedly Transferring From USC Football.
- November 29, 2016 – USC Football Up To No. 11 In College Football Playoff Rankings.
- November 30, 2016 – USC's Sam Darnold Named Finalist For 2016 Manning Award.
- November 30, 2016 – Adoree’ Jackson Named Finalist For Lott IMPACT Trophy.
- December 1, 2016 – Former USC RB Joe McKnight Killed in New Orleans at 28.
- December 4, 2016 – USC Football Ranked No. 9 In Week 15 AP Poll.
- December 4, 2016 – 2017 Rose Bowl Odds: USC Favored Over Penn State.
- December 5, 2016 – Juju Smith-Schuster Teases Return For Senior Season At USC.
- December 5, 2016 – Adoree’ Jackson Snubbed From Heisman Trophy Finalists.
- December 5, 2016 – 3-Star LB Daniel Green De-Commits.
- December 7, 2016 – Adoree’ Jackson, Zach Banner Named First Team All-Americans.
- December 8, 2016 – Adoree’ Jackson Says USC Comeback “Really On The Table”.
- December 8, 2016 – Adoree’ Jackson Wins 2016 Jim Thorpe Award.
- December 8, 2016 – 3-Star CB Wylan Free De-Commits.
- December 10, 2016 – James Lynch De-Commits from 2017 USC Recruiting Class.
- December 10, 2016 – Marcus Johnson Commits to 2018 USC Recruiting Class.
- December 11, 2016 – Juju Smith-Schuster To Announce NFL Decision After Rose Bowl.
- December 11, 2016 – What if Adoree’ Jackson and Juju Smith-Schuster Returned to USC in 2017?.
- December 12, 2016 – Top 10 USC Football Players of 2016.
- December 12, 2016 – Adoree’ Jackson Earns Consensus All-American Honors.
- December 13, 2016 – Jalen Greene To Serve As Back Up QB For Rose Bowl.
- December 13, 2016 – USC Injury Report: Jonathan Lockett To Undergo Season-Ending Surgery.
- December 14, 2016 – USC's Adoree’ Jackson Earns Unanimous All-American Honors.
- December 14, 2016 – Clay Helton Named Finalist For Bear Bryant Coach Of The Year Award.
- December 14, 2016 – USC Football Awards 2016: Adoree’ Jackson Repeats As Team MVP.
- December 14, 2016 – USC Injury Report: Nathan Smith Tears ACL.
- December 15, 2016 – USC Football Is Back In The Rose Bowl and Back On Track.
- December 15, 2016 – Former USC QB Max Browne to Transfer to Pitt.
- December 15, 2016 – Tayler Katoa Commits to 2017 USC Recruiting Class.
- December 16, 2016 – USC left tackle Chad Wheeler named First Team All-American.
- December 17, 2016 – Zach Banner's All-American Nod Pays Off USC Career In Tumultuous Era.
- December 19, 2016 – USC OT Zach Banner Accepts Invitation To 2017 Reese's Senior Bowl.
- December 20, 2016 – USC NFL: Three Trojans Make 2017 Pro Bowl.
- December 22, 2016 – Terrance Lang Commits to 2017 USC Recruiting Class.
- December 22, 2016 – Sam Darnold, Daniel Imatorbhebhe Named to Athlon All-Freshman Team.
- December 27, 2016 – Olajuwon Tucker, Kevin Scott Academically Ineligible for 2017 Rose Bowl.
- December 28, 2016 – Penn State Suspends Two Players for 2017 Rose Bowl vs. USC.
- December 28, 2016 – Long snapper Johnson becomes part of 2017 class.
- December 29, 2016 – USC Football Sending Four Players to East-West Shrine Game.
- December 30, 2016 – Khaliel Rodgers To Transfer Away From USC Football.
