= Chad Wheeler =

American football player (born 1994)

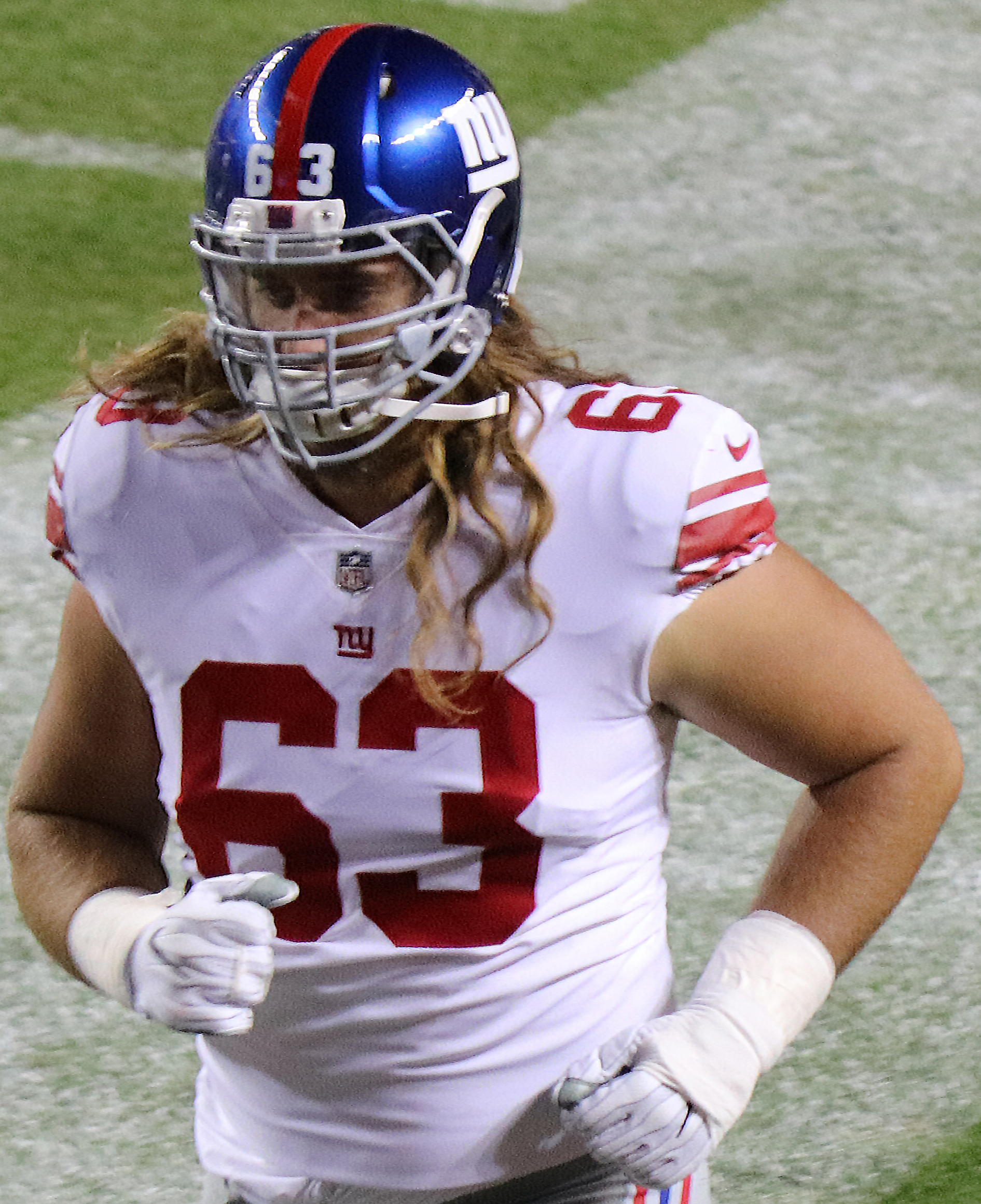
- Wheeler with the New York Giants in 2017

No. 63, 75
- Position: Offensive tackle

Personal information
- Born: January 19, 1994 (age 32); Santa Monica, California, U.S.
- Listed height: 6 ft 7 in (2.01 m)
- Listed weight: 318 lb (144 kg)

Career information
- High school: Santa Monica
- College: USC
- NFL draft: 2017: undrafted

Career history
- New York Giants (2017–2019); Seattle Seahawks (2019–2020)

Awards and highlights
- First-team All-Pac-12 (2016); Second-team All-Pac-12 (2015)

Career NFL statistics
- Games played: 32
- Games started: 19
- Stats at Pro Football Reference

Chad Wheeler (born January 19, 1994) is an American former professional football player who was an offensive tackle in the National Football League (NFL). He played college football for the USC Trojans from 2012 to 2016. At the end of the 2016 season, he was selected as a first-team All-Pac-12 player. He was also chosen by Campus Insiders. In college, he suffered multiple concussions, a torn ACL, and a bout of plantar fasciitis. He was not drafted out of college due to injuries and off-the-field issues, was signed by the New York Giants as an undrafted free agent, and made his NFL debut in 2017. He played for the Seattle Seahawks from 2019 to 2020. He was waived from the team after being charged with three counts of felony domestic violence.

== Early life ==
Wheeler attended Santa Monica High School in Santa Monica, California. He played offensive tackle and defensive end. Wheeler was rated by Rivals.com as a three-star recruit and was ranked as the 114th offensive tackle in his class. He had a shoulder surgery in 2011, during his senior year.

== College career ==
Wheeler committed to the University of Southern California (USC) to play college football. He suffered multiple concussions throughout his college career and also had a torn right ACL in 2014 that ended his season, and a bout of plantar fasciitis in 2016 that caused him to miss two games.

== Professional career ==
=== Pre-draft ===
Coming out of USC, Wheeler received mixed draft projections from NFL draft experts and scouts. Some analysts projected him to be a fourth or seventh round pick, while others projected him to go undrafted and be signed immediately as a priority undrafted free agent. Wheeler received an invitation to the NFL Combine and completed all of the required positional and combine drills. On March 22, 2017, he opted to participate at USC's Pro Day along with JuJu Smith-Schuster, Zach Banner, Justin Davis, Taylor McNamara, Stevie Tu'ikolovatu, Adoree Jackson, Leon McQuay III, Damien Mama, and six other prospects. Team representatives and scouts from all 32 NFL teams attended as Wheeler opted to run all of his combine drills again. He was able to produce a better vertical jump (24"), 40-yard dash (5.28), and 20-yard dash (3.05). Wheeler was ranked the 12th best offensive tackle prospect in the draft by NFLDraftScout.com. Wheeler was regarded as a top prospect based solely on talent, but received mid to late round draft grades due to his history of multiple injuries and off-field incidents.

Pre-draft measurables
Height	Weight	Arm length	Hand span	Wingspan	40-yard dash	10-yard split	20-yard split	20-yard shuttle	Three-cone drill	Vertical jump	Broad jump	Bench press
6 ft 7 in (2.01 m)	306 lb (139 kg)	33 1/8 in (0.84 m)	9 1/2 in (0.24 m)	6 ft 8 5/8 in (2.05 m)	5.28 s	1.91 s	3.05 s	4.95 s	7.95 s	24.0 in (0.61 m)	8 ft 9 in (2.67 m)	15 reps
All values from NFL Combine/USC's Pro Day

=== New York Giants ===
Wheeler was not drafted out of college due to injuries and off-the-field issues. On April 30, 2017, the New York Giants signed Wheeler as an undrafted free agent. He received a three-year, $1.68 million contract that includes $30,000 guaranteed and a signing bonus of $20,000. As one of the top undrafted free agents, Wheeler received multiple offers and opted to sign with New York, who gave him one of the largest contracts among undrafted free agents.

He competed with Adam Bisnowaty and Michael Bowie throughout training camp for the job as the backup offensive tackle. Head coach Ben McAdoo named Wheeler the backup left tackle, behind Ereck Flowers, to begin the regular season.

On October 1, 2017, Wheeler made his regular season debut in the Giants' 25–23 loss to the Tampa Bay Buccaneers. He earned his first career start against the Kansas City Chiefs in relief of injured Justin Pugh, and backup Bobby Hart.

Wheeler entered the 2018 season as a backup tackle behind left tackle Nate Solder and right tackle Ereck Flowers. In Week 3, Wheeler was named the starting right tackle after struggles from Ereck Flowers, and remained there the rest of the season.

Wheeler was waived/injured by the Giants during final roster cuts on August 31, 2019, and reverted to the team's injured reserve list the next day. He was waived from injured reserve with an injury settlement on September 9.

=== Seattle Seahawks ===
On October 15, 2019, Wheeler was signed to the practice squad of the Seattle Seahawks. He was promoted to the active roster on January 8, 2020.

On September 5, 2020, Wheeler was waived by the Seahawks and signed to the practice squad the next day. He was elevated to the active roster on September 12 and December 5 for the team's weeks 1 and 13 games against the Atlanta Falcons and New York Giants, and reverted to the practice squad after each game. He was promoted to the active roster on December 12. He was waived on January 27, 2021, after a domestic violence arrest.

== Personal life ==
On December 19, 2015, Wheeler was involved in an incident on the USC campus. Los Angeles Police responded to a call at 8:45 AM at an apartment in South Los Angeles near the USC campus. The police arrived and a suspect, who was identified as Wheeler, was confronted by police who were concerned he might grab a weapon and got into an altercation with them that led the police to shoot him with multiple bean bag rounds, a type of non-lethal force. Wheeler was detained by the police but not arrested, and was instead transported to a local hospital to be held under protective custody for a psychiatric evaluation. As a result of the incident, Wheeler missed the Holiday Bowl. Wheeler later apologized for the incident.

On January 23, 2021, Wheeler was arrested in Kent, Washington, on domestic violence charges. He was charged with three counts of felony domestic violence and later released on $400,000 bail. Wheeler said he would temporarily retire to "get his life together" after the incident. He pleaded not guilty to the charges on February 1, 2021.

On November 9, 2023, Wheeler was found guilty of a domestic violence assault against his then-girlfriend by a jury in King County, Washington. He was sentenced to 6 1/2 years in prison. On October 19, 2026, an appeals court reduced the severity of this conviction, and returned the case to the trial court for resentencing.
