= Cameron Smith (linebacker) =

American football player (born 1997)

No. 59, 32
- Position: Linebacker

Personal information
- Born: March 26, 1997 (age 29); Roseville, California, U.S.
- Listed height: 6 ft 2 in (1.88 m)
- Listed weight: 235 lb (107 kg)

Career information
- High school: Granite Bay (Granite Bay, California)
- College: USC (2015–2018)
- NFL draft: 2019: 5th round, 162nd overall pick

Career history
- Minnesota Vikings (2019–2020)

Awards and highlights
- Pac-12 Defensive Freshman of the Year (2015); First-team All-Pac-12 (2017); 2× Second-team All-Pac-12 (2016, 2018)

Career NFL statistics
- Total tackles: 8
- Stats at Pro Football Reference

Cameron Smith (born March 26, 1997) is an American former professional football player who was a linebacker for the Minnesota Vikings of the National Football League (NFL). He played college football for the USC Trojans and was selected by the Vikings in the fifth round of the 2019 NFL draft.

== Early life ==
Cameron Smith attended Granite Bay High School in Granite Bay, California. He played linebacker; Granite Bay High won the state championship during Smith's sophomore year, in which Smith was the leading tackler for the season. He also was on Granite Bay's baseball and wrestling teams. Smith was rated by Rivals.com as a four-star recruit and was ranked as the seventh best inside linebacker in his class and 190th best player overall. He committed to the University of Southern California (USC) to play college football where he joined the Beta-Sigma chapter of Tau Kappa Epsilon fraternity.

== College career ==
=== Statistics ===
Year	Team	G	GS	Tackles						
Year	Team	G	GS	Solo	Ast	Total	Loss	Yds	Sack	Yds
2015	USC	10	9	45	33	78	1.0	9	1.0	9
2016	USC	12	12	43	36	79	7.0	24	1.0	6
Career		22	21	88	69	157	8.0	33	2.0	15

Year	Team	Interceptions / Coverage						Fumbles			
Year	Team	INT	Yds	Avg	TD	BU	PD	FF	FR	Yds	TD
2015	USC	3	122	40.6	1	3	6	0	1	0	0
2016	USC	0	0	0.0	0	4	4	1	1	0	0
Career		3	122	40.6	1	7	10	1	2	0	0

== Professional career ==
Pre-draft measurables
Height	Weight	Arm length	Hand span	Wingspan	40-yard dash	10-yard split	20-yard split	20-yard shuttle	Three-cone drill	Vertical jump	Broad jump	Bench press
6 ft 2 in (1.88 m)	238 lb (108 kg)	32 3/8 in (0.82 m)	10 3/8 in (0.26 m)	6 ft 5 in (1.96 m)	4.69 s	1.56 s	2.72 s	4.23 s	7.12 s	39.0 in (0.99 m)	10 ft 3 in (3.12 m)	15 reps
All values from NFL Combine/Pro Day

Smith was selected by the Minnesota Vikings in the fifth round (162nd overall) of the 2019 NFL draft. He was waived on August 31, 2019, and was re-signed to the practice squad the next day. Smith was promoted to the active roster on October 12. He was waived again on November 2, and re-signed to the practice squad. Smith was promoted back to the active roster on November 26.

Smith was placed on the reserve/COVID-19 list by the Vikings on July 29, 2020. On August 8, Smith announced he would need open-heart surgery to fix a bicuspid aortic valve he was born with, and would miss the 2020 season. He was activated from the reserve/COVID-19 list on August 10 and was subsequently waived with a non-football illness designation. He reverted to the team's reserve/non-football illness list after clearing waivers the next day. He announced his retirement on August 18, 2021.
