= Ereck Flowers =

American football player (born 1994)

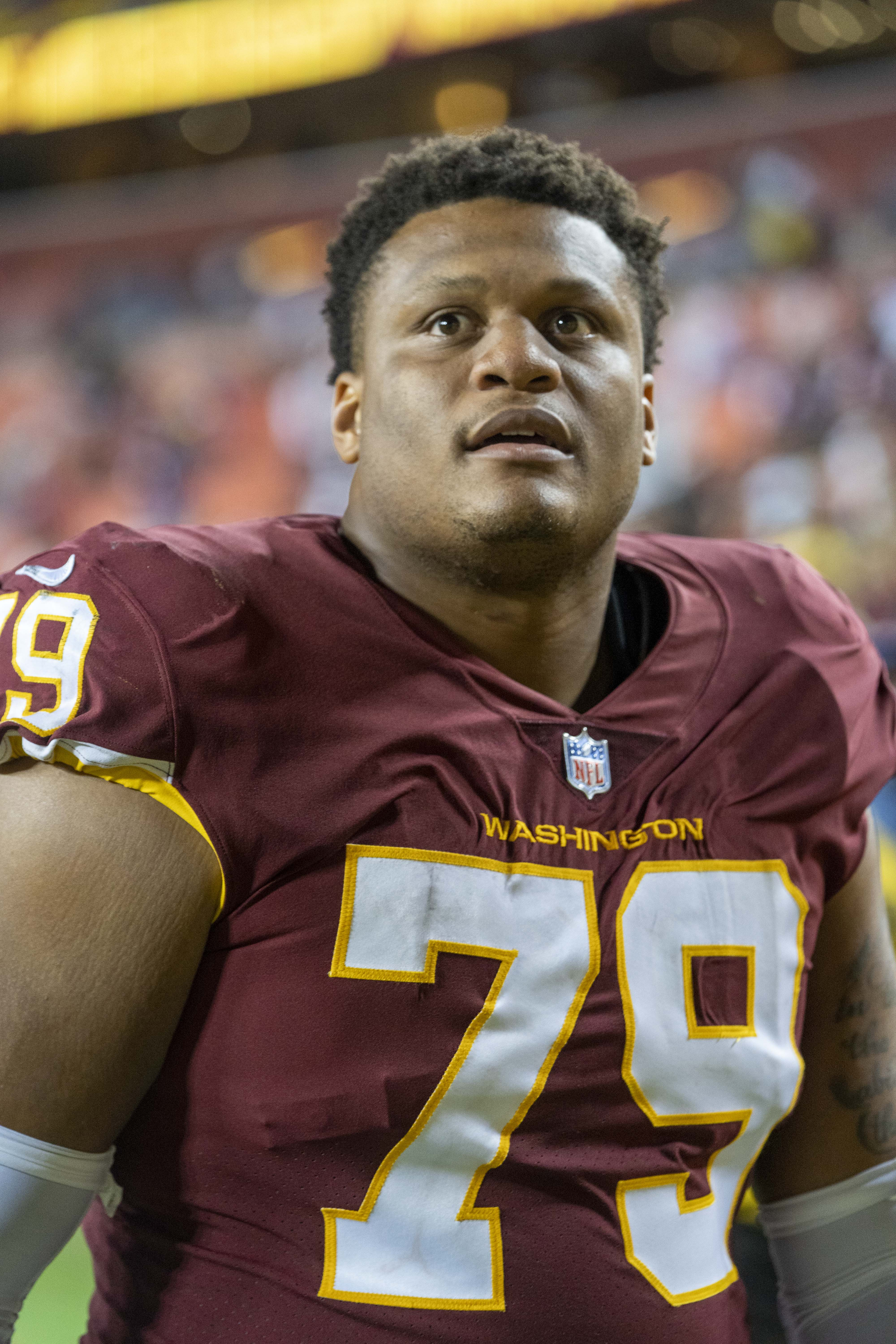
- Flowers with the Washington Football Team in 2021

No. 76, 74, 75, 77, 79
- Position: Offensive tackle / guard

Personal information
- Born: April 25, 1994 (age 32); Miami, Florida, U.S.
- Listed height: 6 ft 6 in (1.98 m)
- Listed weight: 330 lb (150 kg)

Career information
- High school: Miami Norland (Miami Gardens, Florida)
- College: Miami (2012–2014)
- NFL draft: 2015: 1st round, 9th overall pick

Career history
- New York Giants (2015–2018); Jacksonville Jaguars (2018); Washington Redskins (2019); Miami Dolphins (2020); Washington Football Team (2021)

Awards and highlights
- Second-team All-ACC (2014)

Career NFL statistics
- Games played: 105
- Games started: 101
- Stats at Pro Football Reference

Ereck Flowers (born April 25, 1994) is an American former professional football player who was an offensive guard in the National Football League (NFL). He played college football for the Miami Hurricanes and was selected ninth overall by the New York Giants in the 2015 NFL draft. He has also played for the Jacksonville Jaguars, Washington Redskins / Football Team, and Miami Dolphins. Flowers played offensive tackle at the University of Miami and in the early part of his NFL career prior to switching to guard in 2019.

== Early life ==
A native of Miami, Flowers originally attended Krop High School in the Ives Estates, where he was a basketball standout and did not focus on football until his junior year. For his senior year, he transferred to Norland High School in Miami Gardens, where he joined a talented varsity that featured blue chip running back Duke Johnson. Flowers helped the Vikings to a 15–0 season record and a FHSAA Class 5A championship over Crawfordville Wakulla.

Regarded as a four-star recruit by Rivals.com, Flowers was ranked as the 20th-best offensive tackle in his class. ESPN labelled him a three-star recruit and ranked him 57th in his position. He chose Miami (FL) over offers from Purdue, Florida State, and Central Florida.

== College career ==
As a true freshman at the University of Miami in 2012, Flowers played in all 12 games at right tackle, making four starts. As a sophomore in 2013, he started all 12 games at left tackle. He returned as the starting left tackle in 2014. On December 29, 2014, Flowers announced that he would forgo his senior season and enter the 2015 NFL draft.

== Professional career ==
Pre-draft measurables
Height	Weight	Arm length	Hand span	40-yard dash	10-yard split	20-yard split	Vertical jump	Broad jump	Bench press
6 ft 6 1/4 in (1.99 m)	329 lb (149 kg)	34 1/2 in (0.88 m)	9 7/8 in (0.25 m)	5.31 s	1.90 s	3.13 s	27 in (0.69 m)	8 ft 5 in (2.57 m)	37 reps
All values from NFL Combine/Pro Day

=== New York Giants ===
On April 30, 2015, Flowers was selected with the ninth overall pick by the New York Giants in the 2015 NFL draft. He was the highest selected Miami Hurricanes offensive lineman since Bryant McKinnie in 2002. On June 18, 2015, Flowers signed a 4-year $14.3 million contract with the Giants. He was named the Giants starting left tackle for Week 1 and played in 15 games in his rookie season.

Although he wore number 76 jersey throughout his entire rookie season, Flowers decided to switch to his college number 74 during the spring of 2016 after it was left available with the departure of teammate Geoff Schwartz.

Flowers was criticized for not living up to expectations and was considered to be a major draft bust. Through the 2017 season, he gave up 169 total pressures which was the most of any tackle in the NFL during that time. Those stats and his numerous penalties have caused Pro Football Focus to rate him as the 54th best tackle in the NFL. In 2018, former offensive line teammate and NFL analyst Geoff Schwartz accused Flowers of "quitting" on the team, of missing multiple blocks, and of having poor technique.

On May 2, 2018, the Giants declined the fifth-year option on Flowers’ contract, making him a free agent in 2019. He was moved over to right tackle after the Giants signed veteran Nate Solder to be their left tackle. On September 23, 2018, the Giants decided to bench Flowers in favor of Chad Wheeler at right tackle after his continued struggles. On October 8, 2018, the Giants announced plans to release Flowers if a trade with a team couldn't be worked out. The next day, Flowers was officially released by the Giants.

=== Jacksonville Jaguars ===
On October 12, 2018, the Jacksonville Jaguars signed Flowers to a one-year contract after Josh Wells was placed on injured reserve. He was named the starting left tackle in Week 11 and started there the rest of the season.

=== Washington Redskins (first stint) ===
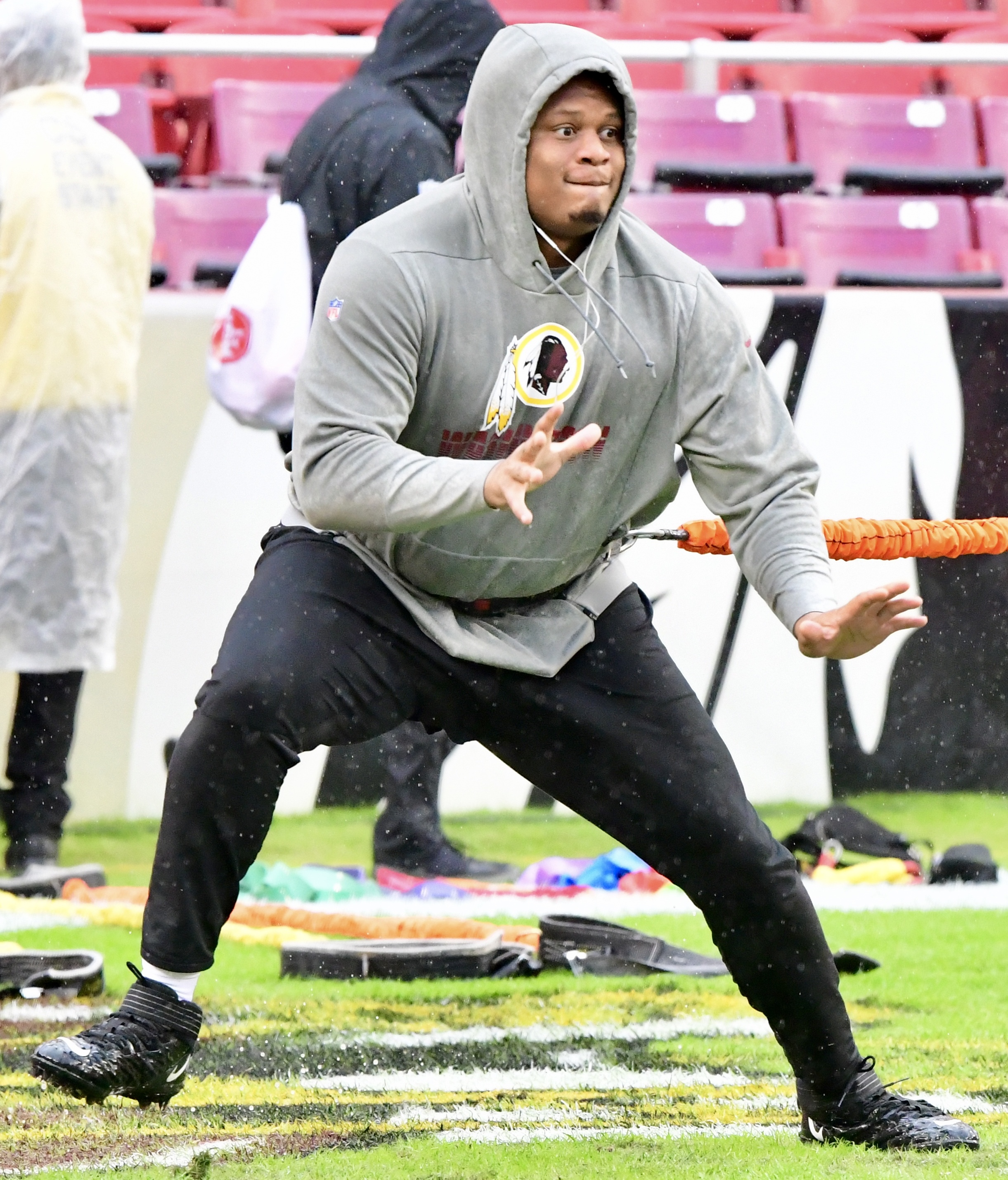
Flowers warming up before a game with the Washington Redskins, 2019

On March 18, 2019, Flowers signed a one-year, $4 million contract with the Washington Redskins. He transitioned to offensive guard during the team's training camp, where he started all season at left guard.

=== Miami Dolphins ===
On March 20, 2020, Flowers signed a three-year, $30 million contract with the Miami Dolphins. He was placed on the COVID-19 reserve list by the team on August 2, 2020, before being activated on August 15.

=== Washington Football Team (second stint) ===
On April 28, 2021, Flowers was traded to the Washington Football Team in exchange for a swap of 2021 seventh round picks from both teams. On December 31, 2021, he was placed on the team's COVID-19 reserve list and was forced to sit out of the Week 17 game against the Philadelphia Eagles. Flowers was placed back on active roster on January 5, 2022. Flowers was released on March 16, 2022.
