= Cary Angeline =

American football player (born 1997)

No. 86, 83
- Position: Tight end

Personal information
- Born: September 8, 1997 (age 29); Chester Springs, Pennsylvania, U.S.
- Listed height: 6 ft 7 in (2.01 m)
- Listed weight: 250 lb (113 kg)

Career information
- High school: Downingtown East (PA)
- College: USC; NC State
- NFL draft: 2021: undrafted

Career history
- Arizona Cardinals (2021)*; Philadelphia Eagles (2021)*; Birmingham Stallions (2022); San Antonio Brahmas (2024)*; Houston Roughnecks (2025)*
- * Offseason or practice squad member only

Awards and highlights
- USFL champion (2022)
- Stats at Pro Football Reference

Cary Angeline (born September 8, 1997) is an American former football tight end. He played college football for USC and NC State and was signed by the Arizona Cardinals as an undrafted free agent in 2021.

== Early life ==
Cary Angeline was born on September 8, 1997, in Chester Springs, Pennsylvania. He attended Downingtown East High School, playing football and basketball. As a sophomore in high school, Angeline made 33 catches for 456 yards and four touchdowns. He recorded 67 receptions the following year, gaining 1,051 yards and 10 touchdowns. As a senior, he compiled 826 receiving yards on 47 catches, scoring 13 touchdowns. He was a Prep All-American, USA Today all-Pennsylvania selection, Associated Press all-state AAAA selection, Pennsylvania Football News all-state first-team selection, and Ches-Mont League Player of the Year selection.

He was a four-star recruit to college and was the number 4 ranked tight end by 247Sports.com. He accepted a scholarship offer from USC following his senior year of high school. As a true freshman at USC, Angeline redshirted. He withdrew from USC in September 2017, as a sophomore, and transferred to North Carolina State University. In 2018, he sat out the first two games due to NCAA transfer rules. Against Virginia, he scored his first career touchdown and made his first career reception. He appeared in 11 games, and started four, making nine catches for 169 yards and one touchdown. His longest catch was 49 yards, made against Syracuse.

As a junior in 2019, Angeline played in twelve games, started four, and recorded 25 catches for 369 yards and five touchdowns. After leading the team in receiving touchdowns, he was awarded the Gary Rowe award, given to the best NC State receiver. He also was given all-conference honorable mention honors. As a senior during 2020, he placed fifth nationally among tight ends for receiving touchdowns with five. He also had 27 receptions, gaining 529 yards. He finished his college career with 61 receptions for 950 yards and 12 touchdowns.

== Professional career ==
=== Arizona Cardinals ===
After going unselected in the 2021 NFL draft, Angeline was signed by the Arizona Cardinals as an undrafted free agent. He was waived on August 10.

=== Philadelphia Eagles ===
On August 22, 2021, Angeline was signed by the Philadelphia Eagles. He was waived again on August 29.

=== Birmingham Stallions ===
Angeline was selected in the 34th round of the 2022 USFL draft by the Birmingham Stallions. He was transferred to the inactive roster on May 6 with an illness. He was moved back to the active roster on May 14. He was released on April 10, 2023.

=== San Antonio Brahmas ===
On October 23, 2023, Angeline signed with the San Antonio Brahmas of the XFL. He was not part of the roster after the 2024 UFL dispersal draft on January 15, 2024.

=== Houston Roughnecks ===
On August 20, 2024, Angeline signed with the Houston Roughnecks of the United Football League (UFL). He retired on December 30, 2024.

== Personal life ==
Angeline has multiple family members who played football. His grandfather Fran played for Colgate, father Chris played for Columbia, uncle Larry played for Mansfield, uncle Jerry played for Hobart, and brother Ryley played for Delaware.
