= Justin Davis (gridiron football) =

American football player (born 1995)

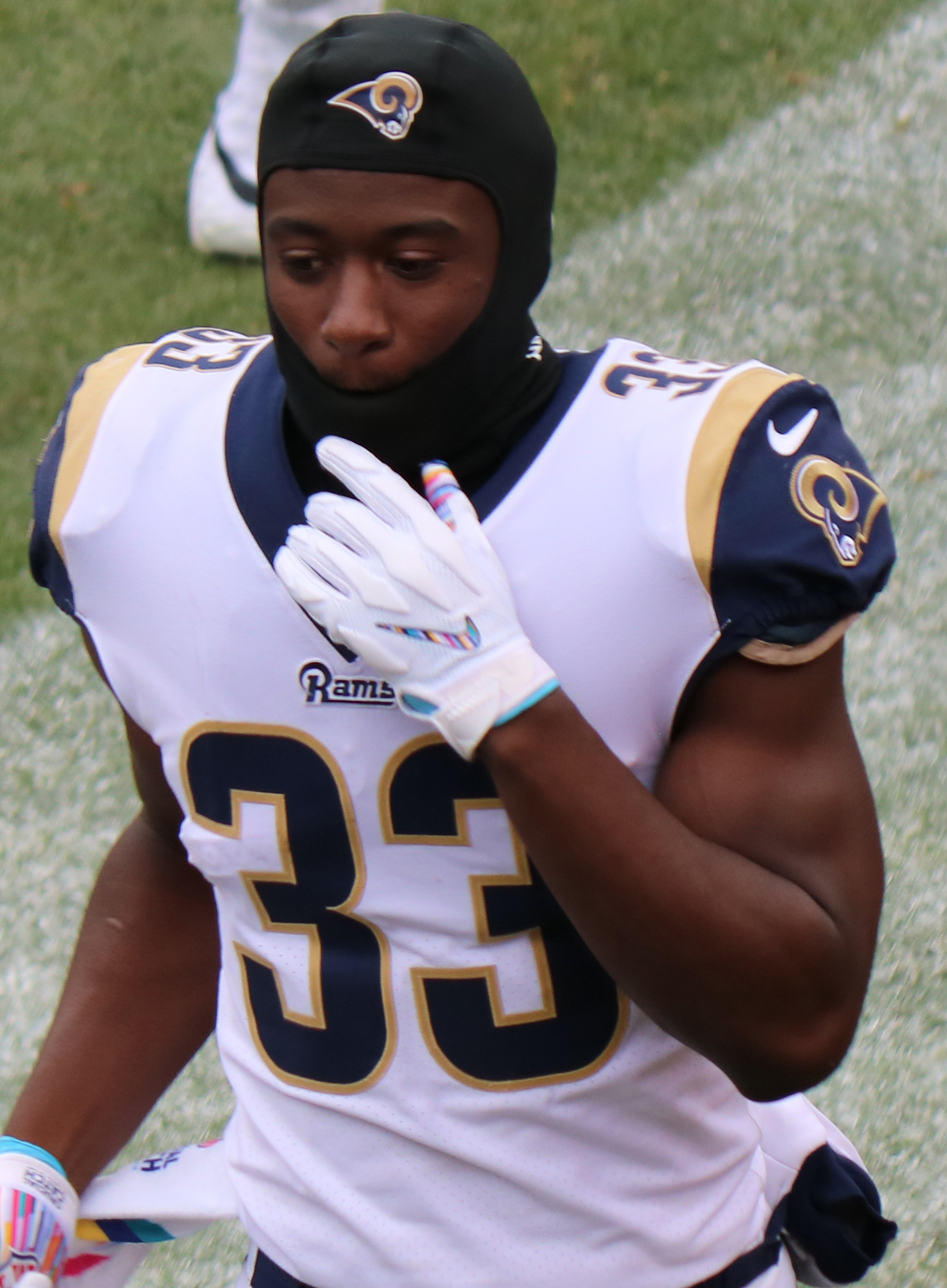
- Davis with the Los Angeles Rams in 2018

No. 33
- Position: Running back

Personal information
- Born: November 11, 1995 (age 30); Stockton, California, U.S.
- Listed height: 6 ft 1 in (1.85 m)
- Listed weight: 199 lb (90 kg)

Career information
- High school: Lincoln (Stockton)
- College: USC
- NFL draft: 2017: undrafted

Career history
- Los Angeles Rams (2017–2018); Arizona Cardinals (2019)*; Ottawa Redblacks (2021)
- * Offseason or practice squad member only

Career NFL statistics
- Rushing attempts: 3
- Rushing yards: 20
- Stats at Pro Football Reference

Justin Davis (born November 11, 1995) is an American former professional football player who was a running back in the National Football League (NFL) and Canadian Football League (CFL). He played college football for the USC Trojans and signed with the Los Angeles Rams as an undrafted free agent in 2017.

== Early life ==
Davis attended Lincoln High School in Stockton, California. While there, he played high school football for the Trojans.

== College career ==
Davis played college football for the USC Trojans. He was named third-team All-Pac-12 by analyst Phil Steele in 2015.

=== College statistics ===
Year	School	Conf	Class	Pos	G	Rushing				Receiving			
Year	School	Conf	Class	Pos	G	Att	Yds	Avg	TD	Rec	Yds	Avg	TD
2013	USC	Pac-12	FR	RB	7	53	361	6.8	6	1	7	7.0	0
2014	USC	Pac-12	SO	RB	13	129	595	4.6	4	13	92	7.1	2
2015	USC	Pac-12	JR	RB	13	169	902	5.3	7	18	189	10.5	0
2016	USC	Pac-12	SR	RB	10	110	607	5.5	2	14	112	8.0	0
Career	USC				43	461	2,465	5.3	19	46	400	8.7	2

== Professional career ==
Pre-draft measurables
Height	Weight	Arm length	Hand span	Wingspan	20-yard shuttle	Three-cone drill	Vertical jump	Broad jump	Bench press
6 ft 0 5/8 in (1.84 m)	208 lb (94 kg)	31 in (0.79 m)	9 5/8 in (0.24 m)	6 ft 1 3/4 in (1.87 m)	4.30 s	6.75 s	30.0 in (0.76 m)	9 ft 7 in (2.92 m)	21 reps
All values from NFL Combine/Pro Day

=== Los Angeles Rams ===
Davis signed with the Los Angeles Rams as an undrafted free agent on April 29, 2017. In Week 1, against the Indianapolis Colts in his NFL debut, Davis had his first career carry, a one-yard rush, in the 46–9 victory. As a rookie, he appeared in four games. In the 2018 season, he had two carries for 19 yards.

Davis was waived during final roster cuts on August 31, 2019.

=== Arizona Cardinals ===
On September 3, 2019, Davis was signed to the Arizona Cardinals' practice squad. His practice squad contract with the team expired on January 6, 2020.

=== Ottawa Redblacks ===
Davis signed with the Ottawa Redblacks of the CFL on July 16, 2021, and was subsequently placed on the team's suspended list. He was moved to the practice roster on July 30, and promoted to the active roster on August 27. Davis was released by the Redblacks on November 17, 2021.
