= Isaac Whitney =

American football player (born 1994)

Profile
- Position: Wide receiver

Personal information
- Born: June 22, 1994 (age 32); Moore, Oklahoma
- Listed height: 6 ft 2 in (1.88 m)
- Listed weight: 204 lb (93 kg)

Career information
- High school: Southmoore (Moore, Oklahoma)
- College: USC
- NFL draft: 2017: undrafted

Career history
- Oakland Raiders (2017); Houston Texans (2018–2019); Tampa Bay Buccaneers (2020)*; Arizona Cardinals (2020–2021)*
- * Offseason or practice squad member only
- Stats at Pro Football Reference

Isaac Demone Whitney (born June 22, 1994) is an American football wide receiver. He played college football at USC.

== College career ==
Whitney played two years at USC after transferring from Riverside City College. He also played one season for the Central Oklahoma Bronchos in 2013.

== Professional career ==
=== Oakland Raiders ===
Whitney signed with the Oakland Raiders as an undrafted free agent on May 5, 2017. He was waived on September 2, 2017 and was signed to the Raiders' practice squad the next day. He was promoted to the active roster on November 29, 2017.

On September 1, 2018, Whitney was waived by the Raiders.

=== Houston Texans ===
On September 18, 2018, Whitney was signed to the Houston Texans' practice squad. He signed a reserve/future contract on January 7, 2019.

On July 27, 2019, Whitney was waived/injured by the Texans and placed on injured reserve.

On September 5, 2020, Whitney was waived by the Texans.

=== Tampa Bay Buccaneers ===
On September 30, 2020, Whitney was signed to the Tampa Bay Buccaneers practice squad. He was released on October 22.

=== Arizona Cardinals ===
On December 23, 2020, Whitney signed with the practice squad of the Arizona Cardinals. He signed a reserve/future contract on January 5, 2021. He was waived on August 6, 2021.
