= Isaiah Langley =

American football player (born 1996)

Profile
- Position: Cornerback

Personal information
- Born: October 13, 1996 (age 30); Pleasanton, California, U.S.
- Listed height: 5 ft 11 in (1.80 m)
- Listed weight: 180 lb (82 kg)

Career information
- High school: Foothill (Pleasanton, California)
- College: USC
- NFL draft: 2019: undrafted

Career history
- Oakland Raiders (2019)*; Indianapolis Colts (2019)*
- * Offseason or practice squad member only

Isaiah Langley (born October 13, 1996) is an American former professional football cornerback. He played college football at USC.

== Professional career ==
=== Oakland Raiders ===
On June 11, 2019, the Oakland Raiders signed Langley; along with wide receiver Montay Crockett before the start of minicamp. Langley was soon cut by Oakland on August 9.

=== Indianapolis Colts ===
On August 11, 2019, the Indianapolis Colts signed Langley. He was waived on August 31, 2019.

== Legal issues ==
=== August 2019 arrest ===
On August 31, 2019, Langley was arrested in Lake Forest, Illinois in connection to a string of Northern California robberies of UPS and FedEx drivers delivering mobile devices to cell phone stores. Seven men and women were initially charged and six guns were seized, including an assault rifle and illegal magazines.

Langley was identified through cell phone data, surveillance video and physical evidence, prosecutors said and is linked to robberies in Pleasant Hill, Fairfield and San Jose.
