= Jordan Simmons =

American football player (born 1994)

Profile
- Position: Guard

Personal information
- Born: July 15, 1994 (age 32); Inglewood, California, U.S.
- Listed height: 6 ft 4 in (1.93 m)
- Listed weight: 339 lb (154 kg)

Career information
- High school: Crespi Carmelite (Encino, CA)
- College: USC
- NFL draft: 2017: undrafted

Career history
- Oakland Raiders (2017–2018)*; Seattle Seahawks (2018–2021); Las Vegas Raiders (2021); Buffalo Bills (2022)*
- * Offseason or practice squad member only

Career NFL statistics
- Games played: 25
- Games started: 9
- Stats at Pro Football Reference

Jordan Simmons (born July 15, 1994) is an American former professional football player who was a guard in the National Football League (NFL). He played college football at the University of Southern California.

== Early life ==
Simmons was born and raised in Inglewood, California and attended Susan Miller Dorsey High School and Crespi Carmelite High School. Simmons excelled on the Celts football team and was rated as a five-star recruit and the 2nd best offensive line prospect in the country as a senior.

== College career ==
Simmons was a member of the USC Trojans football team for five seasons, redshirting his freshman year. Throughout his collegiate career, Simmons struggled with knee injuries and appeared in only nine games during the course of redshirt freshman and sophomore seasons as a reserve. As a redshirt junior, Simmons moved to defensive tackle but only appeared in one game due to injury. During his redshirt senior season, Simmons appeared in all 13 of the Trojans games and made two starts. Simmons appealed to the NCAA for a sixth year of eligibility, but his request was denied.

== Professional career ==
=== Oakland Raiders ===
Simmons was signed by the Oakland Raiders on April 29, 2017. He was cut at the end of training camp and subsequently re-signed to the team's practice squad on September 4. Simmons remained on the Raiders practice squad for the entirety of the 2017 season and signed a reserve/future contract to stay with the team on January 2, 2018, but was waived on September 1, at the end of training camp.

=== Seattle Seahawks ===
Simmons was claimed off waivers by the Seattle Seahawks on September 2, 2018. Simmons made his NFL debut on September 30, against the Arizona Cardinals. Simmons made his first career start at right guard on November 11, against the Los Angeles Rams in place of an injured D. J. Fluker. He was placed on injured reserve on December 18, with a knee injury. Simmons played in six games, starting three at right guard.

On August 31, 2019, Simmons was placed on injured reserve. On April 8, 2020, Simmons was re-signed by the Seahawks. He was re-signed again on March 26, 2021. Simmons was released by Seattle on August 31. He was re-signed to the team's practice squad on September 6.

=== Las Vegas Raiders ===
On September 15, 2021, Simmons was signed by the Las Vegas Raiders off the Seahawks practice squad.

=== Buffalo Bills ===
On July 25, 2022, Simmons signed with the Buffalo Bills following a workout. He was waived by Buffalo on August 14.
