= Porter Gustin =

American football player (born 1997)

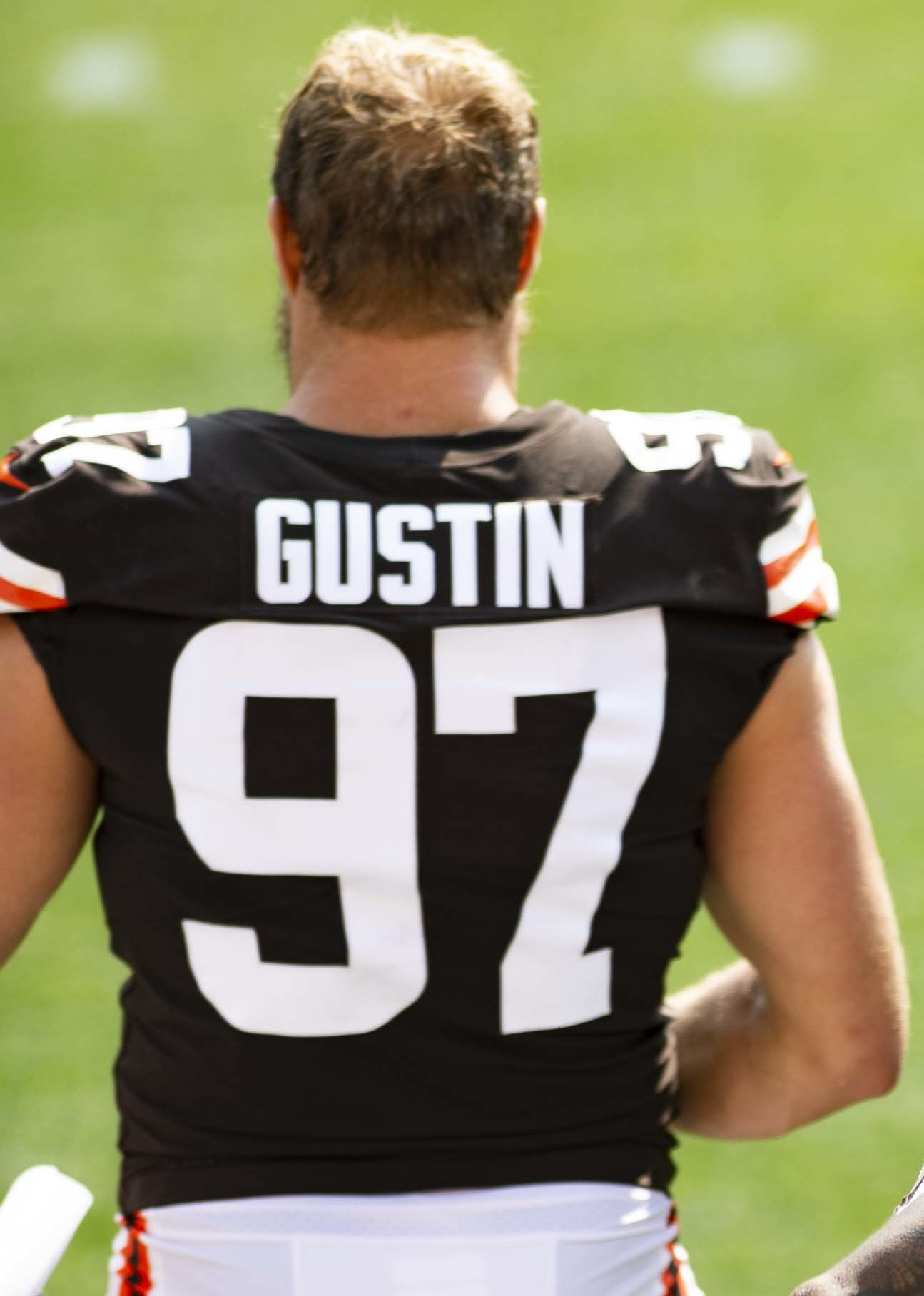
- Gustin with the Cleveland Browns in 2020

Profile
- Position: Defensive end

Personal information
- Born: February 8, 1997 (age 29); Boise, Idaho, U.S.
- Listed height: 6 ft 5 in (1.96 m)
- Listed weight: 257 lb (117 kg)

Career information
- High school: Salem Hills (UT)
- College: USC
- NFL draft: 2019: undrafted

Career history
- New Orleans Saints (2019)*; Cleveland Browns (2019–2021); Miami Dolphins (2022)*
- * Offseason or practice squad member only

Career NFL statistics
- Total tackles: 52
- Sacks: 1
- Fumble recoveries: 2
- Stats at Pro Football Reference

Porter Gustin (born February 8, 1997) is an American professional football defensive end. He played college football at USC.

== Early life ==
Gustin was born in Boise, Idaho and moved to Emmett, Idaho as a first grader. He attended Emmett High School for his first two years of high school. He then attended Salem Hills High School in Utah for his final two years.

== Professional career ==
Pre-draft measurables
Height	Weight	Arm length	Hand span	40-yard dash	Vertical jump	Broad jump	Bench press
6 ft 4 1/2 in (1.94 m)	255 lb (116 kg)	33 in (0.84 m)	10 in (0.25 m)	4.69 s	35.5 in (0.90 m)	9 ft 11 in (3.02 m)	31 reps
All values from NFL Combine

=== New Orleans Saints ===
Gustin was signed by the New Orleans Saints as an undrafted free agent following the 2019 NFL draft. He was waived on August 31, 2019.

=== Cleveland Browns ===
On November 4, 2019, Gustin was signed to the practice squad of the Cleveland Browns. He was promoted to the active roster on November 22, 2019.

Gustin was placed on the reserve/COVID-19 list by the team on November 26, 2020, and activated on December 8. In the Wild Card round of the playoffs against the Pittsburgh Steelers, Gustin intercepted a pass thrown by Ben Roethlisberger during the 48–37 win.

Gustin was given an exclusive-rights free agent tender by the Browns on March 5, 2021. He signed the one-year contract on April 15. Gustin was waived by the Browns on August 31, 2021. Gustin was re-signed to the Browns' practice squad on September 1, 2021. The Browns elevated Gustin to their active roster on November 20, 2021, and again on December 18. He was signed to the Browns' active roster on December 21, 2021.

=== Miami Dolphins ===
The Miami Dolphins signed Gustin on June 8, 2022. He was waived by the Dolphins on August 30, 2022, and re-signed to the practice squad.
