= Damien Mama =

American football player (born 1995)

No. 51
- Position: Guard

Personal information
- Born: June 27, 1995 (age 31); Moreno Valley, California, U.S.
- Listed height: 6 ft 3 in (1.91 m)
- Listed weight: 342 lb (155 kg)

Career information
- High school: St. John Bosco (Bellflower, California)
- College: USC
- NFL draft: 2017: undrafted

Career history
- Kansas City Chiefs (2017)*; New York Giants (2017); Dallas Cowboys (2018)*; San Diego Fleet (2019); Los Angeles Wildcats (2020)*; New York Guardians (2020); TSL Jousters (2021); Tampa Bay Bandits (2022); San Antonio Brahmas (2023)
- * Offseason or practice squad member only

Awards and highlights
- Second-team All-Pac-12 (2016)
- Stats at Pro Football Reference

Damien Mama (born June 27, 1995) is an American former football guard. He played college football at USC.

== Early life ==
Mama attended St. John Bosco High School, where he was a two-way player at offensive tackle and defensive tackle.

As a senior, he contributed to the team winning the CIF Pac-5 Division championship and the CIF state championship Open Division bowl game. He also received All-East Region, All-CIF Pac-5 Division, Max Preps All-State Division I first team, Los Angeles Times All-Area Lineman of the Year, USA Today All-USA first team, Parade All-American first team, Prep Star All-American Dream Team and Max Preps All-American honors.

== College career ==
Mama accepted a football scholarship from USC. As a true freshman, he appeared in 12 games (all but Washington State), starting the first two contests at right guard and two additional games at left guard.

As a sophomore, he started 13 out of 14 games (all but UCLA) at left offensive guard.

As a junior, he started all games at left offensive guard. He declared for the NFL Draft before the start of his senior season.

== Professional career ==
Pre-draft measurables
Height	Weight	Arm length	Hand span	Wingspan	40-yard dash	10-yard split	20-yard split	20-yard shuttle	Three-cone drill	Vertical jump	Broad jump
6 ft 3 1/2 in (1.92 m)	334 lb (151 kg)	35 in (0.89 m)	11 in (0.28 m)	6 ft 11 7/8 in (2.13 m)	5.77 s	2.00 s	3.29 s	5.00 s	8.25 s	24.5 in (0.62 m)	8 ft 1 in (2.46 m)
All values from NFL Combine/Pro Day

=== Kansas City Chiefs ===
Mama was signed as an undrafted free agent by the Kansas City Chiefs after the 2017 NFL draft on May 6. He was waived on September 2, 2017, and was signed to the Chiefs' practice squad the next day.

=== New York Giants ===
On December 12, 2017, Mama was signed by the New York Giants off the Chiefs' practice squad. He was waived by the Giants on May 7, 2018.

=== Dallas Cowboys ===
On May 21, 2018, Mama signed with the Dallas Cowboys. He was waived on September 1.

=== San Diego Fleet ===
On October 14, 2018, Mama signed with the San Diego Fleet of the Alliance of American Football (AAF) . He was a starter until the league folded in April 2019.

=== Los Angeles Wildcats ===
Mama was drafted in the 5th round in phase two in the 2020 XFL draft by the Los Angeles Wildcats.

=== New York Guardians ===
On January 21, 2020, Mama was sent to the New York Guardians in a three-team trade. In March, amid the COVID-19 pandemic, the league announced that it would be cancelling the rest of the season. He played in all 5 games at offensive guard. He had his contract terminated when the league suspended operations on April 10, 2020.

=== Tampa Bay Bandits ===
Mama was selected in the 23rd round of the 2022 USFL draft by the Tampa Bay Bandits.

Mama and all other Tampa Bay Bandits players were all transferred to the Memphis Showboats after it was announced that the Bandits were taking a hiatus and that the Showboats were joining the league.

=== San Antonio Brahmas ===
On February 15, 2023, Mama signed with the San Antonio Brahmas of the XFL. He was released on March 8.
