= Taylor McNamara (American football) =

American football player (born 1994)

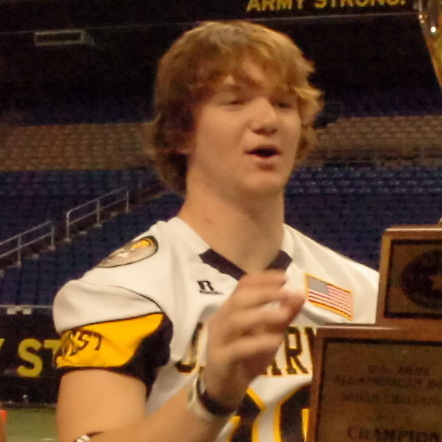
- McNamara in 2012

Profile
- Position: Tight end

Personal information
- Born: August 12, 1994 (age 32); San Diego, California
- Listed height: 6 ft 4 in (1.93 m)
- Listed weight: 252 lb (114 kg)

Career information
- High school: San Diego (CA) Westview
- College: USC
- NFL draft: 2017: undrafted

Career history
- Cleveland Browns (2017)*
- * Offseason or practice squad member only
- Stats at Pro Football Reference

Taylor McNamara (born August 12, 1994) is an American former football tight end. He played college football at Oklahoma and USC.

== Professional career ==
Pre-draft measurables
Height	Weight	Arm length	Hand span	Wingspan	40-yard dash	10-yard split	20-yard split	20-yard shuttle	Three-cone drill	Vertical jump	Broad jump	Bench press
6 ft 4 3/8 in (1.94 m)	252 lb (114 kg)	33 1/4 in (0.84 m)	9 7/8 in (0.25 m)	6 ft 7 3/4 in (2.03 m)	4.78 s	1.64 s	2.76 s	4.36 s	7.07 s	32.5 in (0.83 m)	9 ft 9 in (2.97 m)	14 reps
All values from Pro Day

=== Cleveland Browns ===
McNamara signed with the Cleveland Browns as an undrafted free agent on May 4, 2017. He was waived on September 1, 2017 during roster cutdowns.
