= Leon McQuay III =

American football player (born 1994)

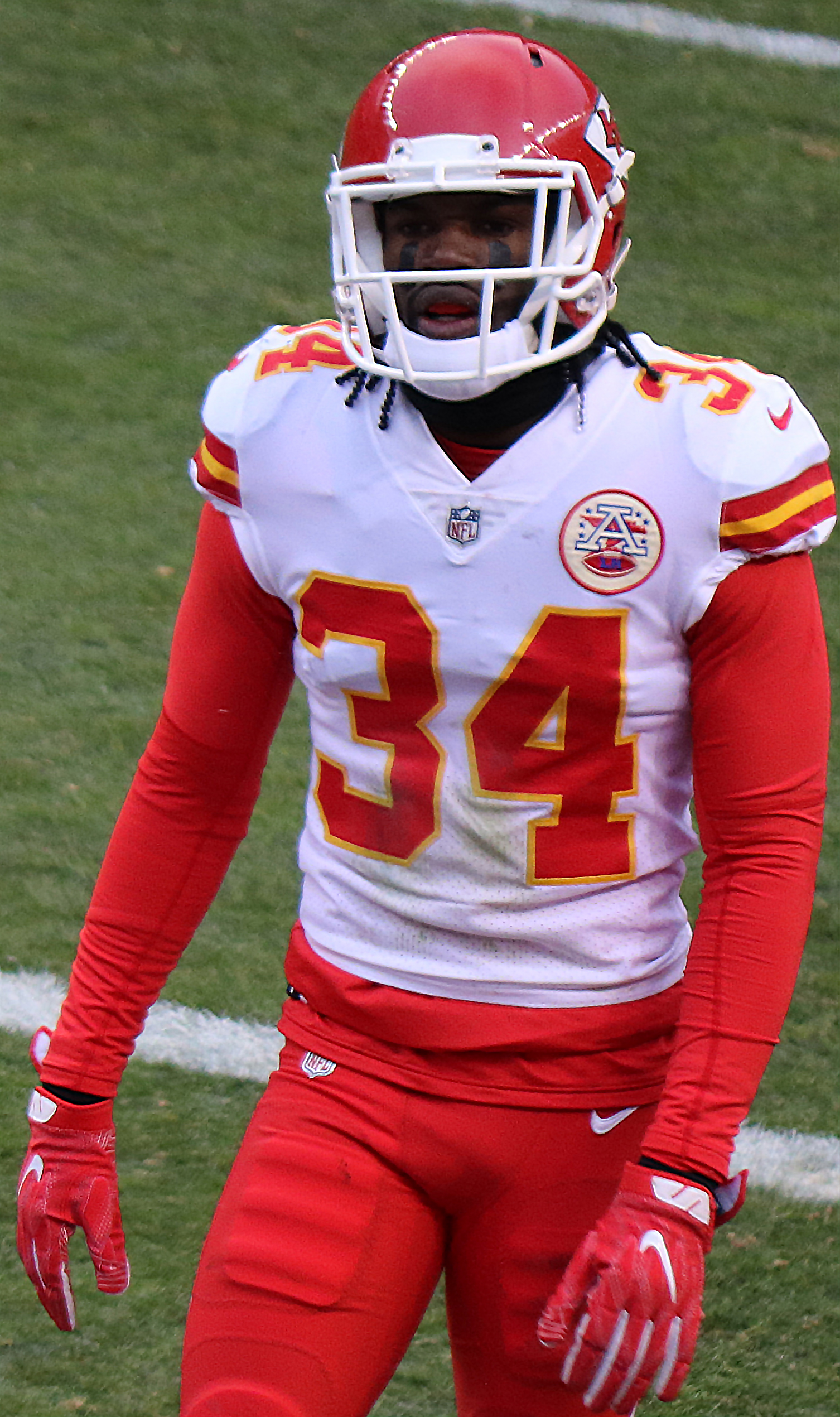
- McQuay with the Kansas City Chiefs in 2017

No. 34
- Position: Safety

Personal information
- Born: November 21, 1994 (age 31); Tampa, Florida, U.S.
- Listed height: 6 ft 1 in (1.85 m)
- Listed weight: 195 lb (88 kg)

Career information
- High school: Armwood (Seffner, Florida)
- College: USC
- NFL draft: 2017: 6th round, 218th overall pick

Career history
- Kansas City Chiefs (2017–2018)

Career NFL statistics
- Total tackles: 4
- Pass deflections: 1
- Stats at Pro Football Reference

Leon McQuay III (born November 21, 1994) is an American former professional football player who was a safety in the National Football League (NFL). He played college football for the USC Trojans. He is the grandson of Leon McQuay who was a running back selected by the New York Giants in 1973.

== Professional career ==
Pre-draft measurables
Height	Weight	Arm length	Hand span	Wingspan	Vertical jump	Broad jump	Bench press
6 ft 1 1/8 in (1.86 m)	197 lb (89 kg)	31 7/8 in (0.81 m)	9 1/2 in (0.24 m)	6 ft 5 3/8 in (1.97 m)	33.0 in (0.84 m)	10 ft 2 in (3.10 m)	12 reps
All values from Pro Day

McQuay was selected by the Kansas City Chiefs in the sixth round, 218th overall, in the 2017 NFL draft. He was waived on September 2, 2017, and was signed to the Chiefs' practice squad the next day. He was elevated to the active roster on December 11, 2017.

On September 1, 2018, McQuay was waived by the Chiefs and was signed to the practice squad the next day. He was promoted to the active roster on October 13, 2018, but was waived three days later and re-signed back to the practice squad. He signed a reserve/future contract with the Chiefs on January 25, 2019. He was waived on May 7, 2019.
