= Stevie Tu'ikolovatu =

American football player (born 1991)

No. 97
- Position: Nose tackle

Personal information
- Born: June 28, 1991 (age 35); Salt Lake City, Utah, U.S.
- Listed height: 6 ft 1 in (1.85 m)
- Listed weight: 320 lb (145 kg)

Career information
- High school: East (Salt Lake City)
- College: USC
- NFL draft: 2017: 7th round, 223rd overall pick

Career history
- Tampa Bay Buccaneers (2017–2018)

Awards and highlights
- Second-team All-Pac-12 (2016)
- Stats at Pro Football Reference

Steven Camae Tu'ikolovatu (born June 28, 1991) is an American former football nose tackle. He played college football for the Utah Utes before transferring to the USC Trojans. He is the nephew of Sione Po'uha, a fellow defensive tackle drafted by the New York Jets in 2005. He was selected by the Tampa Bay Buccaneers in the seventh round of the 2017 NFL draft.

== Professional career ==
Pre-draft measurables
Height	Weight	Arm length	Hand span	Wingspan	40-yard dash	10-yard split	20-yard split	20-yard shuttle	Three-cone drill	Vertical jump	Broad jump	Bench press
6 ft 1 1/8 in (1.86 m)	331 lb (150 kg)	33 in (0.84 m)	10 1/4 in (0.26 m)	6 ft 6 5/8 in (2.00 m)	5.25 s	1.81 s	3.01 s	4.87 s	7.85 s	26.0 in (0.66 m)	7 ft 11 in (2.41 m)	33 reps
All values from NFL Combine/Pro Day

Tu'ikolovatu was selected by the Tampa Bay Buccaneers in the seventh round, 223rd overall, in the 2017 NFL draft. He was placed on injured reserve on September 1, 2017.

On August 16, 2018, Tu'ikolovatu was waived/injured by the Buccaneers with a triceps injury and was placed on injured reserve.

On May 29, 2019, the Buccaneers waived Tu'ikolovatu. He was later re-signed on August 7, 2019. He was waived during final roster cuts on August 30, 2019.
