= 2017 Arizona State Sun Devils football team =

American college football season

2017 Arizona State Sun Devils football

Sun Bowl, L 31–52 vs. NC State
- Conference: Pac-12 Conference
- South Division
- Record: 7–6 (6–3 Pac-12)
- Head coach: Todd Graham (6th season)
- Offensive coordinator: Billy Napier (1st season)
- Offensive scheme: Spread
- Defensive coordinator: Phil Bennett (1st season)
- Base defense: Multiple 4–3
- Home stadium: Sun Devil Stadium

2017 Pac-12 Conference football standings
	Conf.			Overall
Team	W		L	W		L
North Division
No. 20 Stanford xy	7	–	2	9	–	5
No. 16 Washington x	7	–	2	10	–	3
Washington State	6	–	3	9	–	4
Oregon	4	–	5	7	–	6
California	2	–	7	5	–	7
Oregon State	0	–	9	1	–	11
South Division
No. 12 USC xy$	8	–	1	11	–	3
Arizona State	6	–	3	7	–	6
Arizona	5	–	4	7	–	6
UCLA	4	–	5	6	–	7
Utah	3	–	6	7	–	6
Colorado	2	–	7	5	–	7
Championship: USC 31, Stanford 28
$ – Conference champion; x – Division champion/co-champions; y – Championship game participant; Rankings from AP Poll

The 2017 Arizona State Sun Devils football team represented Arizona State University in the 2017 NCAA Division I FBS football season. The Sun Devils were led by sixth-year head coach Todd Graham and played their home games at Sun Devil Stadium. They competed as a member of the South Division of the Pac-12 Conference. They finished the season 7–6, 6–3 in Pac-12 play to finish in second place in the South Division. They were invited to the Sun Bowl where they lost to NC State.

On November 26, one day after the conclusion of the regular season, Graham and Arizona State agreed to part ways. He continued to coach the team through their bowl game.

== Preseason ==
=== Coaching changes ===
Arizona State hired Phil Bennett as defensive coordinator on January 11, 2017. Bennett was previously the defensive coordinator at Baylor University. He replaced Keith Patterson, who remained on the staff as linebackers coach.

Arizona State hired Billy Napier as offensive coordinator on January 28, 2017. Napier was previously the receivers coach at the University of Alabama. He replaced Chip Lindsey, who left to become the offensive coordinator at Auburn University.

=== Recruiting class ===
College recruiting
Name	Hometown	School	Height	Weight	Commit date
Eno Benjamin; RB	Wylie, Texas	Wylie East HS	5 ft 9 in (1.75 m)	204 lb (93 kg)	Enrolled
Eno Benjamin; RB	Recruit ratings: Scout: 247Sports: ESPN:				
Alex Perry; CB	Las Vegas, Nevada	Bishop Gorman HS	5 ft 11 in (1.80 m)	178 lb (81 kg)	Enrolled
Alex Perry; CB	Recruit ratings: Scout: 247Sports: ESPN:				
Tyler Johnson; WDE	Gilbert, Arizona	Highland HS	6 ft 4 in (1.93 m)	245 lb (111 kg)	Enrolled
Tyler Johnson; WDE	Recruit ratings: Scout: 247Sports: ESPN:				
Ryan Kelley; QB	Chandler, Arizona	Basha HS	6 ft 3 in (1.91 m)	188 lb (85 kg)	Enrolled
Ryan Kelley; QB	Recruit ratings: Scout: 247Sports: ESPN:				
K.J Jarrell; S	Scottsdale, Arizona	Saguaro HS	6 ft 1 in (1.85 m)	175 lb (79 kg)	Enrolled
K.J Jarrell; S	Recruit ratings: Scout: 247Sports: ESPN:				
Evan Fields; S	Oklahoma City, Oklahoma	Midwest City HS	6 ft 2 in (1.88 m)	191 lb (87 kg)	Enrolled
Evan Fields; S	Recruit ratings: Scout: 247Sports: ESPN:				
Trelon Smith; APB	Houston, Texas	Cy Ridge HS	5 ft 8 in (1.73 m)	181 lb (82 kg)	Jun 30, 2017
Trelon Smith; APB	Recruit ratings: Scout: 247Sports: ESPN:				
Kyle Soelle; TE	Scottsdale, Arizona	Saguaro HS	6 ft 4 in (1.93 m)	220 lb (100 kg)	Jun 30, 2017
Kyle Soelle; TE	Recruit ratings: Scout: 247Sports: ESPN:				
D.J Davidson; DT	Mesa, Arizona	Desert Ridge HS	6 ft 5 in (1.96 m)	300 lb (140 kg)	
D.J Davidson; DT	Recruit ratings: Scout: 247Sports: ESPN:				
Curtis Hodges; WR	Mesa, Arizona	Mountain View HS	6 ft 7 in (2.01 m)	198 lb (90 kg)	
Curtis Hodges; WR	Recruit ratings: Scout: 247Sports: ESPN:				
Ty Thomas; S	Lubbock, Texas	Cooper HS	5 ft 11 in (1.80 m)	195 lb (88 kg)	
Ty Thomas; S	Recruit ratings: Scout: 247Sports: ESPN:				
Loren Mondy; ILB	Mansfield, Texas	Lake Ridge HS	6 ft 0 in (1.83 m)	234 lb (106 kg)	
Loren Mondy; ILB	Recruit ratings: Scout: 247Sports: ESPN:				
DeMonte King; S	Long Beach, California	Los Alamitos HS	6 ft 1 in (1.85 m)	195 lb (88 kg)	
DeMonte King; S	Recruit ratings: Scout: 247Sports: ESPN:				
Langston Frederick; CB	League City, Texas	Clear Springs HS	5 ft 10 in (1.78 m)	185 lb (84 kg)	
Langston Frederick; CB	Recruit ratings: Scout: 247Sports: ESPN:				
Brandon Ruiz; K	Gilbert, Arizona	Williams Field HS	5 ft 10 in (1.78 m)	165 lb (75 kg)	
Brandon Ruiz; K	Recruit ratings: Scout: 247Sports: ESPN:				
Corey Stephens; OG	Scottsdale, Arizona	Saguaro HS	6 ft 2 in (1.88 m)	290 lb (130 kg)	
Corey Stephens; OG	Recruit ratings: Scout: 247Sports: ESPN:				
Mark Walton; TE	Yuma, Arizona	Cibola HS	6 ft 5 in (1.96 m)	225 lb (102 kg)	
Mark Walton; TE	Recruit ratings: Scout: 247Sports: ESPN:				
Shannon Forman; DT	Baton Rouge, Louisiana	Southern Lab HS	6 ft 2 in (1.88 m)	290 lb (130 kg)	
Shannon Forman; DT	Recruit ratings: Scout: 247Sports: ESPN:				
Kobe Williams; CB	Long Beach, California	Long Beach Poly HS	5 ft 9 in (1.75 m)	175 lb (79 kg)	
Kobe Williams; CB	Recruit ratings: Scout: 247Sports: ESPN:				
Darien Cornay; CB	Norwalk, California	Los Alamitos HS	5 ft 10 in (1.78 m)	180 lb (82 kg)	
Darien Cornay; CB	Recruit ratings: Scout: 247Sports: ESPN:				
Ceejhay French-Love; TE	Monterey Park, California	Long Beach Poly HS	6 ft 5 in (1.96 m)	255 lb (116 kg)	
Ceejhay French-Love; TE	Recruit ratings: Scout: 247Sports: ESPN:				
Overall recruit ranking:
Note: In many cases, Scout, Rivals, 247Sports, On3, and ESPN may conflict in their listings of height and weight.; In these cases, the average was taken. ESPN grades are on a 100-point scale.; Sources:

=== Incoming transfers ===
Arizona State had one incoming transfer. Quarterback Blake Barnett transferred from Alabama. Barnett was eligible to play the entire 2017 season at Arizona State following an appeal to the NCAA.

=== Offseason departures ===
Arizona State lost 18 players in the 2016 offseason, 13 due to graduation and 5 due to transferring or injuries.

Name	Number	Pos.	Year	Notes
Edmond Boateng	97	DE	Senior	Graduated
Tramel Topps	92	DL	Senior	Graduated
Frederick Gammage	89	WR	Senior	Graduated
Kody Kohl	83	TE	Senior	Graduated
Salamo Fiso	58	LB	Senior	Graduated
Evan Goodman	57	OL	Senior	Graduated
Stephon McCray	77	OL	Senior	Graduated
Carlos Mendoza	7	LB	Senior	Graduated
Laiu Moeakiola	12	LB	Senior	Graduated
Tim White	12	WR	Senior	Graduated
De'Chavon Hayes	1	DB	Senior	Graduated
Eric Lauderdale	14	DB	Senior	Graduated
Brandon Mathews	54	OL	Senior	Graduated
Ellis Jefferson	19	WR	Senior	Transfer
James Johnson	18	S	Junior	Transfer
Bryce Perkins	3	QB	Junior	Transfer
Armand Perry	13	CB	Sophomore	Retired due to Injuries.
Kareem Orr	25	DB	Sophomore	transferred

== Schedule ==
Arizona State announced their 2017 football schedule on January 18, 2017. In non-conference play, the Sun Devils played former Border Conference rivals New Mexico State and Texas Tech, as well as San Diego State. In Pac-12 conference play, they played all conference members except cross-divisional foes California and Washington State.

Date	Time	Opponent	Site	TV	Result	Attendance
August 31	7:30 p.m.	New Mexico State*	Sun Devil Stadium; Tempe, AZ	P12N	W 37–31	46,596
September 9	8:00 p.m.	San Diego State*	Sun Devil Stadium; Tempe, AZ	P12N	L 20–30	54,336
September 16	5:00 p.m.	at Texas Tech*	Jones AT&T Stadium; Lubbock, TX	FSN	L 45–52	60,454
September 23	7:00 p.m.	No. 24 Oregon	Sun Devil Stadium; Tempe, AZ	P12N	W 37–35	50,110
September 30	1:00 p.m.	at Stanford	Stanford Stadium; Stanford, CA	P12N	L 24–34	44,422
October 14	7:45 p.m.	No. 5 Washington	Sun Devil Stadium; Tempe, AZ	ESPN	W 13–7	51,234
October 21	12:30 p.m.	at Utah	Rice-Eccles Stadium; Salt Lake City, UT	FS1	W 30–10	45,863
October 28	7:45 p.m.	No. 21 USC^{†}	Sun Devil Stadium; Tempe, AZ	ESPN	L 17–48	53,446
November 4	6:00 p.m.	Colorado	Sun Devil Stadium; Tempe, AZ	P12N	W 41–30	44,553
November 11	6:30 p.m.	at UCLA	Rose Bowl; Pasadena, CA	P12N	L 37–44	53,847
November 18	1:00 p.m.	at Oregon State	Reser Stadium; Corvallis, OR	P12N	W 40–24	36,063
November 25	2:00 p.m.	Arizona	Sun Devil Stadium; Tempe, AZ (Territorial Cup)	P12N	W 42–30	59,385
December 29	1:00 p.m.	vs. No. 24 NC State*	Sun Bowl Stadium; El Paso, TX (Sun Bowl)	CBS	L 31–52	39,897
*Non-conference game; ^{†}Homecoming; Rankings from AP Poll released prior to the game; All times are in Pacific time

Source: 2017 Arizona State Sun Devils Football Schedule

== Game summaries ==
=== vs New Mexico State ===
New Mexico State Aggies (0–0) vs Arizona State Sun Devils (0–0) – Game summary

Quarter	1	2	3	4	Total
Aggies	0	13	0	18	31
Sun Devils	14	0	16	7	37

at Sun Devil Stadium • Tempe, AZ

- Date: August 31, 2017
- Game time: 7:30 p.m.
- Game weather: Mostly clear skies, 101 °F (38 °C)
- Game attendance: 46,596
- Referee: Michael Mothershed
- TV announcers (Pac-12 Network): Roxy Bernstein (play-by-play), Anthony Herron (analyst), Lewis Johnson (sideline reporter)

Game information

First quarter

- (10:37) ASU – Kalen Ballage 7-yard run, Brandon Ruiz kick (Drive: 9 plays, 61 yards, 3:02; Arizona State 7–0)
- (8:26) ASU – Jalen Harvey 53-yard pass from Manny Wilkins, Brandon Ruiz kick (Drive: 2 plays, 71 yards, 0:24; Arizona State 14–0)

Second quarter

- (10:52) NMSU – Jaleel Scott 15-yard pass from Tyler Rogers, kick failed (Drive: 13 plays, 89 yards, 4:00; Arizona State 14–6)
- (0:32) NMSU – Tyler Rogers 1-yard run, Dylan Brown kick (Drive: 11 plays, 89 yards, 2:36; Arizona State 14–13)

Third quarter

- (8:50) ASU – Brandon Ruiz 52-yard field goal (Drive: 13 plays, 41 yards, 6:10; Arizona State 17–13)
- (7:50) ASU – John Humphrey 60-yard pass from Manny Wilkins, kick failed (Drive: 1 play, 60 yards, 0:09; Arizona State 24–13)
- (0:50) ASU – Kalen Ballage 20-yard run, Brandon Ruiz kick (Drive: 8 plays, 67 yards, 3:23; Arizona State 31–13)

Fourth quarter

- (13:52) ASU – Kobe Williams 49-yard interception return, Brandon Ruiz kick (Arizona State 38–13)
- (8:27) NMSU – Jason Huntley 50-yard run, two-point pass failed (Drive: 3 plays, 59 yards, 1:06; Arizona State 38–19)
- (5:04) NMSU – Jason Huntley 23-yard pass from Tyler Rogers, two-point pass failed (Drive: 7 plays, 57 yards, 2:03; Arizona State 38–25)
- (0:00) NMSU – Jaleel Scott 29-yard pass from Tyler Rogers (Drive: 6 plays, 85 yards, 0:48; Arizona State 38–31)

Statistics	NMSU	ASU
First downs	27	19
Total yards	549	400
Rushing yards	30–151	40–79
Passing yards	398	321
Passing: Comp–Att–Int	40–58–2	24–30–0
Time of possession	30:20	29:40

Team	Category	Player	Statistics
New Mexico State	Passing	Tyler Rogers	40/57, 398 yards, 3 TD, 2 INT
New Mexico State	Rushing	Jason Huntley	5 carries, 84 yards, TD
New Mexico State	Receiving	Jaleel Scott	8 receptions, 149 yards, 2 TD
Arizona State	Passing	Manny Wilkins	22/27, 300 yards, 2 TD
Arizona State	Rushing	Kalen Ballage	18 carries, 79 yards, 2 TD
Arizona State	Receiving	John Humphrey	7 receptions, 123 yards, TD

=== vs San Diego State ===
San Diego State Aztecs (1–0) vs Arizona State Sun Devils (1–0) – Game summary

Quarter	1	2	3	4	Total
Aztecs	7	13	7	3	30
Sun Devils	7	7	0	6	20

at Sun Devil Stadium • Tempe, AZ

- Date: September 9, 2017
- Game time: 8:00 p.m.
- Game weather: Mostly clear skies, 91 °F (33 °C)
- Game attendance: 54,336
- Referee: Land Clark
- TV announcers (Pac-12 Network): Roxy Bernstein (play-by-play), Anthony Herron (analyst), Lewis Johnson (sideline reporter)

Game information

First quarter

- (8:04) SDSU – Rashaad Penny 95-yard run, John Baron kick (Drive: 3 plays, 99 yards, 1:30; San Diego State 7–0)
- (0:00) ASU – Kalen Ballage 1-yard run, Brandon Ruiz kick (Drive: 9 plays, 85 yards, 3:56; Tied 7–7)

Second quarter

- (14:45) SDSU – Rashaad Penny 99-yard kickoff return, Brandon Ruiz kick (San Diego State 14–7)
- (7:39) SDSU – John Baron 29-yard field goal (Drive: 11 plays, 43 yards, 5:49; San Diego State 17–7)
- (4:54) ASU – N'Keal Harry 5-yard pass from Manny Wilkins, Brandon Ruiz kick (Drive: 7 plays, 77 yards, 2:39; San Diego State 17–14)
- (0:06) SDSU – John Baron 27-yard field goal (Drive: 4 plays, 9 yards, 0:24; San Diego State 20–14)

Third quarter

- (1:52) SDSU – Rashaad Penny 33-yard pass from Christian Chapman, John Baron kick (Drive: 11 plays, 58 yards, 6:28; San Diego State 27–14)

Fourth quarter

- (14:45) SDSU – John Baron 32-yard field goal (Drive: 5 plays, 17 yards, 1:10; San Diego State 30–14)
- (8:34) ASU – Frank Darby 53-yard pass from Manny Wilkins, two-point pass failed (Drive: 10 plays, 75 yards, 6:11; San Diego State 30–20)

Statistics	SDSU	ASU
First downs	14	15
Total yards	352	342
Rushing yards	43–279	31–44
Passing yards	73	298
Passing: Comp–Att–Int	9–18–0	20–33–0
Time of possession	31:43	28:17

Team	Category	Player	Statistics
San Diego State	Passing	Christian Chapman	9/18, 73 yards, TD
San Diego State	Rushing	Rashaad Penny	18 carries, 216 yards, TD
San Diego State	Receiving	Rashaad Penny	4 receptions, 38 yards, TD
Arizona State	Passing	Manny Wilkins	20/33, 298 yards, 2 TD
Arizona State	Rushing	Kalen Ballage	15 carries, 44 yards, TD
Arizona State	Receiving	Frank Darby	3 receptions, 111 yards, TD

=== at Texas Tech ===
Arizona State Sun Devils (1–1) at Texas Tech Red Raiders (1–0) – Game summary

Quarter	1	2	3	4	Total
Sun Devils	3	14	21	7	45
Red Raiders	21	14	10	7	52

at Jones AT&T Stadium • Lubbock, TX

- Date: September 16, 2017
- Game time: 5:00 p.m.
- Game weather: Cloudy - Rain Chance, 75 °F (24 °C)
- Game attendance: 58,547
- Referee: Chris Coyte
- TV announcers (Fox Sports Networks): Mark Followill (play-by-play), Brian Baldinger (analyst), Lesley McCaslin (sideline reporter)

Game information

First quarter

- (7:48) ASU – Brandon Ruiz 44-yard field goal (Drive: 8 plays, 46 yards, 3:14; Arizona State 3–0)
- (4:25) TTU – Keke Coutee 12-yard pass from Nic Shimonek, Clayton Hatfield kick (Drive: 10 plays, 75 yards, 3:23; Texas Tech 7–3)
- (1:48) TTU – Cameron Batson 11-yard pass from Nic Shimonek, Clayton Hatfield kick (Drive: 3 plays, 72 yards, 0:52; Texas Tech 14–3)
- (0:04) TTU – Dylan Cantrell 29-yard pass from Nic Shimonek, Clayton Hatfield kick (Drive: 3 plays, 22 yards, 1:05; Texas Tech 21–3)

Second quarter

- (11:42) ASU – Kyle Williams 3-yard pass from Manny Wilkins, Brandon Ruiz kick (Drive: 8 plays, 75 yards, 3:22; Texas Tech 21–10)
- (5:34) ASU – Demario Richard 1-yard run, Brandon Ruiz kick (Drive: 9 plays, 80 yards, 3:50; Texas Tech 21–17)
- (3:31) TTU – Mason Reed 10-yard pass from Nic Shimonek, Clayton Hatfield kick (Drive: 5 plays, 75 yards, 2:03; Texas Tech 28–17)
- (0:30) TTU – Dylan Cantrell 14-yard pass from Nic Shimonek, Clayton Hatfield kick (Drive: 4 plays, 27 yards, 0:37; Texas Tech 35–17)

Third quarter

- (11:49) ASU – Kalen Ballage 1-yard run, Brandon Ruiz kick (Drive: 5 plays, 73 yards, 1:27; Texas Tech 35–24)
- (9:25) TTU – Derrick Willies 28-yard pass from Nic Shimonek, Michael Barden kick (Drive: 7 plays, 75 yards, 2:24; Texas Tech 42–24)
- (6:31) ASU – Frank Darby 21-yard run, Brandon Ruiz kick (Drive: 9 plays, 74 yards, 2:54; Texas Tech 42–31)
- (3:06) TTU – Michael Barden 39-yard field goal (Drive: 10 plays, 54 yards, 3:25; Texas Tech 45–31)
- (0:37) ASU – Kyle Williams 9-yard pass from Manny Wilkins, Brandon Ruiz kick (Drive: 9 plays, 79 yards, 2:29; Texas Tech 45–38)

Fourth quarter

- (9:52) ASU – N'Keal Harry 21-yard pass from Manny Wilkins, Brandon Ruiz kick (Drive: 9 plays, 62 yards, 4:10; Tied 45–45)
- (1:55) TTU – Dylan Cantrell 3-yard run, Nic Shimonek two-point pass to Ryan Agnew (Drive: 12 plays, 90 yards, 4:31; Texas Tech 52–45)

Statistics	ASU	TTU
First downs	27	33
Total yards	494	615
Rushing yards	44–168	29–72
Passing yards	326	543
Passing: Comp–Att–Int	27–41–0	37–50–0
Time of possession	32:29	27:31

Team	Category	Player	Statistics
Arizona State	Passing	Manny Wilkins	27/46, 326 yards, 3 TD
Arizona State	Rushing	Kalen Ballage	16 carries, 56 yards, TD
Arizona State	Receiving	N'Keal Harry	13 receptions, 148 yards, TD
Texas Tech	Passing	Nic Shimonek	37/50, 543 yards, 6 TD
Texas Tech	Rushing	Justin Stockton	12 carries, 47 yards
Texas Tech	Receiving	Keke Coutee	12 receptions, 186 yards, TD

=== vs No. 24 Oregon ===
No. 24 Oregon Ducks (3–0) vs Arizona State Sun Devils (1–2) – Game summary

Quarter	1	2	3	4	Total
No. 24 Ducks	7	7	14	7	35
Sun Devils	17	0	14	6	37

at Sun Devil Stadium • Tempe, AZ

- Date: September 23, 2017
- Game time: 7:00 p.m.
- Game weather: Clear skies, 81 °F (27 °C)
- Game attendance: 50,110
- Referee: Steve Strimling
- TV announcers (Pac-12 Network): Roxy Bernstein (play-by-play), Anthony Herron (analyst), Lewis Johnson (sideline reporter)

Game information

First quarter

- (11:56) ASU – Manny Wilkins 8-yard run, Brandon Ruiz kick (Drive: 5 plays, 40 yards, 1:34; Arizona State 7–0)
- (9:11) ORE – Dillon Mitchell 7-yard pass from Justin Herbert, Aidan Schneider kick (Drive: 8 plays, 75 yards, 2:45; Tied 7–7)
- (3:15) ASU – N'Keal Harry 3-yard pass from Manny Wilkins, Brandon Ruiz kick (Drive: 15 plays, 75 yards, 5:56; Arizona State 14–7)
- (1:30) ASU – Brandon Ruiz 29-yard field goal (Drive: 7 plays, 42 yards, 1:44; Arizona State 17–7)

Second quarter

- (0:31) ORE – Royce Freeman 12-yard run, Aidan Schneider kick (Drive: 1 play, 12 yards, 0:06; Arizona State 17–14)

Third quarter

- (13:34) ASU – Manny Wilkins 2-yard run, Brandon Ruiz kick (Drive: 4 plays, 75 yards, 1:26; Arizona State 24–14)
- (10:53) ASU – Demario Richard 7-yard run, Brandon Ruiz kick (Drive: 4 plays, 60 yards, 1:45; Arizona State 31–14)
- (9:02) ORE – Johnny Johnson III 20-yard pass from Justin Herbert, Aidan Schneider kick (Drive: 7 plays, 75 yards, 1:51; Arizona State 31–21)
- (4:33) ORE – Tony Brooks-James 22-yard pass from Justin Herbert, Aidan Schneider kick (Drive: 5 plays, 62 yards, 1:19; Arizona State 31–28)

Fourth quarter

- (13:25) ASU – Brandon Ruiz 24-yard field goal (Drive: 7 plays, 40 yards, 3:19; Arizona State 34–28)
- (6:41) ORE – Justin Herbert 4-yard run, Aidan Schneider kick (Drive: 6 plays, 74 yards, 2:01; Oregon 35–34)
- (2:33) ASU – Brandon Ruiz 41-yard field goal (Drive: 11 plays, 57 yards, 3:59; Arizona State 37–35)

Statistics	ORE	ASU
First downs	20	23
Total yards	401	489
Rushing yards	30–120	53–142
Passing yards	281	347
Passing: Comp–Att–Int	19–35–0	24–39–0
Time of possession	21:54	38:06

Team	Category	Player	Statistics
Oregon	Passing	Justin Herbert	19/35, 281 yards, 3 TD
Oregon	Rushing	Royce Freeman	15 carries, 81 yards, TD
Oregon	Receiving	Jake Breeland	4 receptions, 95 yards
Arizona State	Passing	Manny Wilkins	24/39, 347 yards, TD
Arizona State	Rushing	Demario Richard	21 carries, 64 yards, TD
Arizona State	Receiving	N'Keal Harry	7 receptions, 170 yards, TD

=== at Stanford ===
Arizona State Sun Devils (2–2) at Stanford Cardinal (2–2) – Game summary

Quarter	1	2	3	4	Total
Sun Devils	3	14	0	7	24
Cardinal	7	17	7	3	34

at Stanford Stadium • Stanford, CA

- Date: September 30, 2017
- Game time: 1:00 p.m.
- Game weather: Sunny, 73 °F (23 °C)
- Game attendance: 44,422
- Referee: Kevin Mar
- TV announcers (Pac-12 Network): Ted Robinson (play-by-play), Yogi Roth (analyst), Jill Savage (sideline reporter)

Game information

First quarter

- (13:27) STAN – Bryce Love 61-yard run, Jet Toner kick (Drive: 4 plays, 75 yards, 1:33; Stanford 7–0)
- (0:45) ASU – Brandon Ruiz 32-yard field goal (Drive: 12 plays, 84 yards, 5:48; Stanford 7–3)

Second quarter

- (13:22) STAN – Bryce Love 43-yard run, Jet Toner kick (Drive: 2 plays, 39 yards, 0:44; Stanford 14–3)
- (7:25) ASU – Demario Richard 3-yard run, Brandon Ruiz kick (Drive: 14 plays, 75 yards, 5:57; Stanford 14–10)
- (4:11) STAN – J. J. Arcega-Whiteside 12-yard pass from K. J. Costello, Jet Toner kick (Drive: 6 plays, 75 yards, 3:14; Stanford 21–10)
- (1:33) ASU – Ceejhay French-Love 14-yard pass from N'Keal Harry, Brandon Ruiz kick (Drive: 8 plays, 75 yards, 2:38; Stanford 21–17)
- (0:00) STAN – Jet Toner 21-yard field goal (Drive: 8 plays, 61 yards, 1:33; Stanford 24–17)

Third quarter

- (6:46) STAN – Bryce Love 59-yard run, Jet Toner kick (Drive: 5 plays, 78 yards, 2:17; Stanford 31–17)

Fourth quarter

- (8:02) ASU – Demario Richard 2-yard run, Brandon Ruiz kick (Drive: 10 plays, 86 yards, 5:08; Stanford 31–24)
- (2:26) STAN – Jet Toner 22-yard field goal (Drive: 11 plays, 71 yards, 5:36; Stanford 34–24)

Statistics	ASU	STAN
First downs	22	17
Total yards	409	501
Rushing yards	46–214	33–328
Passing yards	195	173
Passing: Comp–Att–Int	16–25–2	15–24–0
Time of possession	32:15	27:45

Team	Category	Player	Statistics
Arizona State	Passing	Manny Wilkins	15/24, 181 yards, 2 INT
Arizona State	Rushing	Demario Richard	22 carries, 80 yards, 2 TD
Arizona State	Receiving	Demario Richard	3 receptions, 57 yards
Stanford	Passing	K. J. Costello	15/24, 173 yards, TD
Stanford	Rushing	Bryce Love	25 carries, 301 yards, 3 TD
Stanford	Receiving	J. J. Arcega-Whiteside	4 receptions, 63 yards, TD

=== vs No. 5 Washington ===
No. 5 Washington Huskies (5–1) vs Arizona State Sun Devils (2–3) – Game summary

Quarter	1	2	3	4	Total
No. 5 Huskies	0	0	0	7	7
Sun Devils	7	6	0	0	13

at Sun Devil Stadium • Tempe, AZ

- Date: October 14, 2017
- Game time: 7:45 p.m.
- Game weather: Clear skies, 83 °F (28 °C)
- Game attendance: 51,234
- Referee: Mark Duddy
- TV announcers (ESPN): Dave Pasch (play-by-play), Greg McElroy (analyst), Tom Luginbill (sideline reporter)

Game information

First quarter

- (5:26) ASU – Kalen Ballage 1-yard run, Brandon Ruiz kick (Drive: 16 plays, 63 yards, 8:08; Arizona State 7–0)

Second quarter

- (14:03) ASU – Brandon Ruiz 52-yard field goal (Drive: 4 plays, 1 yard, 0:45; Arizona State 10–0)
- (5:44) ASU – Brandon Ruiz 25-yard field goal (Drive: 13 plays, 59 yards, 6:04; Arizona State 13–0)

Third quarter

- No scoring plays

Fourth quarter

- (5:32) WASH – Jake Browning 1-yard run, Tristan Vizcaino kick (Drive: 14 plays, 71 yards, 3:32; Arizona State 13–7)

Statistics	WASH	ASU
First downs	14	17
Total yards	230	285
Rushing yards	31–91	32–40
Passing yards	139	245
Passing: Comp–Att–Int	17–30–0	29–41–0
Time of possession	25:05	34:55

Team	Category	Player	Statistics
Washington	Passing	Jake Browning	17/30, 139 yards
Washington	Rushing	Myles Gaskin	14 carries, 67 yards
Washington	Receiving	Dante Pettis	7 receptions, 56 yards
Arizona State	Passing	Manny Wilkins	29/41, 245 yards
Arizona State	Rushing	Demario Richard	8 carries, 23 yards
Arizona State	Receiving	N'Keal Harry	9 receptions, 79 yards

=== at Utah ===
Arizona State Sun Devils (3–3) at Utah Utes (4–2) – Game summary

Quarter	1	2	3	4	Total
Sun Devils	9	7	7	7	30
Utes	0	0	3	7	10

at Rice-Eccles Stadium • Salt Lake City, UT

- Date: October 21, 2017
- Game time: 12:30 p.m.
- Game weather: Partly Cloudy, 49 °F (9 °C)
- Game attendance: 45,863
- Referee: Steve Strimling
- TV announcers (FS1): Justin Kutcher (play-by-play), Mark Helfrich (analyst), Petros Papadakis (analyst), Shane Bacon (sideline reporter)

Game information

First quarter

- (10:37) ASU – Brandon Ruiz 47-yard field goal (Drive: 11 plays, 46 yards, 4:23; Arizona State 3–0)
- (8:06) ASU – Brandon Ruiz 40-yard field goal (Drive: 4 plays, 6 yards, 1:35; Arizona State 6–0)
- (2:33) ASU – Brandon Ruiz 30-yard field goal (Drive: 14 plays, 62 yards, 4:27; Arizona State 9–0)

Second quarter

- (0:40) ASU – Demario Richard 1-yard run, Brandon Ruiz kick (Drive: 9 plays, 94 yards, 4:29; Arizona State 16–0)

Third quarter

- (10:32) UTAH – Matt Gay 53-yard field goal (Drive: 10 plays, 40 yards, 4:28; Arizona State 16–3)
- (4:45) ASU – Manny Wilkins 1-yard run, Brandon Ruiz kick (Drive: 12 plays, 75 yards, 5:47; Arizona State 23–3)

Fourth quarter

- (7:31) ASU – Jay Jay Wilson 20-yard interception return, Brandon Ruiz kick (Arizona State 30–3)
- (2:41) UTAH – Devonta'e Henry-Cole 2-yard run, Matt Gay kick (Drive: 13 plays, 81 yards, 4:43; Arizona State 30–10)

Statistics	ASU	UTAH
First downs	21	18
Total yards	345	265
Rushing yards	46–205	25–110
Passing yards	140	155
Passing: Comp–Att–Int	19–29–1	19–35–4
Time of possession	36:19	23:41

Team	Category	Player	Statistics
Arizona State	Passing	Manny Wilkins	19/29, 140 yards, INT
Arizona State	Rushing	Demario Richard	18 carries, 93 yards, TD
Arizona State	Receiving	N'Keal Harry	8 receptions, 72 yards
Utah	Passing	Tyler Huntley	19/35, 155 yards, 4 INT
Utah	Rushing	Zack Moss	12 carries, 49 yards
Utah	Receiving	Darren Carrington	6 receptions, 56 yards

=== vs No. 21 USC ===
No. 21 USC Trojans (6–2) vs Arizona State Sun Devils (4–3) – Game summary

Quarter	1	2	3	4	Total
No. 21 Trojans	14	17	7	10	48
Sun Devils	3	7	7	0	17

at Sun Devil Stadium • Tempe, AZ

- Date: October 28, 2017
- Game time: 7:45 p.m.
- Game attendance: 53,446
- Referee: Land Clark
- TV announcers (ESPN): Beth Mowins (play-by-play), Anthony Becht (analyst), Rocky Boiman (sideline reporter)

Game information

First quarter

- (11:27) USC – Deonta Burnett 32-yard pass from Sam Darnold, Chase McGrath kick (Drive: 9 plays, 75 yards, 3:33; USC 7–0)
- (6:50) ASU – Brandon Ruiz 39-yard field goal (Drive: 6 plays, 77 yards, 2:30; USC 7–3 )
- (2:25) USC – Tyler Vaughns 42-yard pass from Sam Darnold, Chase McGrath kick (Drive: 5 plays, 75 yards, 1:18; USC 14–3)

Second quarter

- (14:24) USC – Ronald Jones 67-yard run, Chase McGrath kick (Drive: 3 plays, 80 yards, 1:11; USC 21–3)
- (6:02) USC – Tyler Vaughns 19-yard pass from Sam Darnold, Chase McGrath kick (Drive: 7 plays, 88 yards, 2:51; USC 28–3)
- (0:52) USC – Chase McGrath 51-yard field goal (Drive: 12 plays, 29 yards, 3:04; USC 31–3 )
- (0:00) ASU – Kyle Williams 47-yard pass from Manny Wilkins, Brandon Ruiz kick (Drive: 6 plays, 76 yards, 0:45; USC 31–10)

Third quarter

- (11:30) ASU – Manny Wilkins 1-yard run, Brandon Ruiz kick (Drive: 11 plays, 75 yards, 3:30; USC 31–17)
- (10:10) USC – Ronald Jones 64-yard run, Chase McGrath kick (Drive: 3 plays, 77 yards, 1:13; USC 38–17)

Fourth quarter

- (10:36) USC – Chase McGrath 33-yard field goal (Drive: 14 plays, 55 yards, 5:36; USC 41–17)
- (1:03) USC – Ykili Ross 37-yard interception return, Chase McGrath kick (USC 48–17)

Statistics	USC	ASU
First downs	29	15
Total yards	607	357
Rushing yards	46–341	30–79
Passing yards	266	278
Passing: Comp–Att–Int	19–35–0	18–31–1
Time of possession	34:03	26:57

Team	Category	Player	Statistics
USC	Passing	Sam Darnold	19/35, 266 yards, 3 TD
USC	Rushing	Ronald Jones	18 carries, 216 yards, 2 TD
USC	Receiving	Tyler Vaughns	6 receptions, 126 yards, 2 TD
Arizona State	Passing	Manny Wilkins	17/29, 259 yards, TD
Arizona State	Rushing	Demario Richard	15 carries, 70 yards
Arizona State	Receiving	Kyle Williams	7 receptions, 121 yards, TD

=== vs Colorado ===
Colorado Buffaloes (2–7) vs Arizona State Sun Devils (5–4) – Game summary

Quarter	1	2	3	4	Total
Buffaloes	3	14	10	3	30
Sun Devils	0	14	3	24	41

at Sun Devil Stadium • Tempe, AZ

- Date: November 4, 2017
- Game time: 6:00 p.m.
- Game weather: Partly Cloudy, 79 °F (26 °C)
- Game attendance: 44,553
- Referee: Kevin Mar
- TV announcers (Pac-12 Network): Roxy Bernstein (play-by-play), Anthony Herron (analyst), Lewis Johnson (sideline reporter)

Game information

First quarter

- (9:33) COLO – James Stefanou 34-yard field goal (Drive: 14 plays, 62 yards, 4:15; Colorado 3–0)

Second quarter

- (11:46) COLO – Phillip Lindsay 6-yard run, James Stefanou kick (Drive: 13 plays, 73 yards, 4:23; Colorado 10–0)
- (5:38) ASU – N'Keal Harry 20-yard pass from Manny Wilkins, Brandon Ruiz kick (Drive: 6 plays, 72 yards, 2:41; Colorado 10–7)
- (1:07) COLO – Phillip Lindsay 1-yard run, James Stefanou kick (Drive: 8 plays, 51 yards, 1:13; Colorado 17–7)
- (0:07) ASU – Kyle Williams 25-yard pass from Manny Wilkins, Brandon Ruiz kick (Drive: 7 plays, 77 yards, 0:54; Colorado 17–14)

Third quarter

- (11:02) COLO – James Stefanou 53-yard field goal (Drive: 4 plays, 3 yards, 1:32; Colorado 20–14)
- (6:00) ASU – Brandon Ruiz 34-yard field goal (Drive: 15 plays, 59 yards, 5:02; Colorado 20–17)
- (4:55) COLO – Shay Fields 54-yard pass from Steven Montez, James Stefanou kick (Drive: 3 plays, 69 yards, 0:55; Colorado 27–17)

Fourth quarter

- (13:37) ASU – Brandon Ruiz 37-yard field goal (Drive: 10 plays, 76 yards, 3:46; Colorado 27–20)
- (8:38) ASU – Demario Richard 5-yard run, Brandon Ruiz kick (Drive: 7 plays, 40 yards, 2:24; Tied 27–27)
- (7:09) COLO – James Stefanou 28-yard field goal (Drive: 5 plays, 64 yards, 1:29; Colorado 30–27)
- (5:33) ASU – Eno Benjamin 19-yard run, Brandon Ruiz kick (Drive: 5 plays, 75 yards, 1:36; Arizona State 34–30)
- (0:46) ASU – Manny Wilkins 1-yard run, Brandon Ruiz kick (Drive: 7 plays, 85 yards, 2:11; Arizona State 41–30)

Statistics	COLO	ASU
First downs	23	27
Total yards	454	583
Rushing yards	39–109	54–381
Passing yards	345	202
Passing: Comp–Att–Int	23–41–1	18–34–0
Time of possession	26:50	33:10

Team	Category	Player	Statistics
Colorado	Passing	Steven Montez	23/41, 345 yards, TD, INT
Colorado	Rushing	Phillip Lindsay	23 carries, 80 yards, 2 TD
Colorado	Receiving	Shay Fields	6 receptions, 128 yards, TD
Arizona State	Passing	Manny Wilkins	18/34, 202 yards, 2 TD
Arizona State	Rushing	Demario Richard	25 carries, 189 yards, TD
Arizona State	Receiving	N'Keal Harry	6 receptions, 81 yards, TD

=== at UCLA ===
Arizona State Sun Devils (5–4) at UCLA Bruins (4–5) – Game summary

Quarter	1	2	3	4	Total
Sun Devils	14	10	7	7	38
Bruins	7	7	14	7	35

at Rose Bowl • Pasadena, CA

- Date: November 11, 2017
- Game time: 6:30 p.m.
- Game weather: Fair, 60 °F (16 °C)
- Game attendance: 53,847
- Referee: Steve Strimling
- TV announcers (Pac-12 Network): Ted Robinson (play-by-play), Yogi Roth (analyst), Jill Savage (sideline reporter)

Game information

First quarter

- (8:34) ASU – N'Keal Harry 7-yard pass from Manny Wilkins, Brandon Ruiz kick (Drive: 6 plays, 50 yards, 1:41; Arizona State 7–0)
- (3:39) ASU – Demario Richard 2-yard run, Brandon Ruiz kick (Drive: 12 plays, 63 yards, 4:32; Arizona State 14–0)
- (1:23) UCLA – Tyler Vaughns 27-yard interception return, JJ Molson kick (Arizona State 14–7)

Second quarter

- (12:34) UCLA – Josh Rosen 1-yard run, JJ Molson kick (Drive: 6 plays, 73 yards, 1:37; Tied 14–14)
- (7:55) ASU – Manny Wilkins 16-yard run, Brandon Ruiz kick (Drive: 10 plays, 75 yards, 4:33; Arizona State 21–14)
- (6:50) UCLA – JJ Molson 31-yard field goal (Drive: 5 plays, 62 yards, 1:01; Arizona State 21–17)
- (3:49) UCLA – JJ Molson 38-yard field goal (Drive: 8 plays, 38 yards, 1:37; Arizona State 21–20)

Third quarter

- (11:21) UCLA – Soso Jamabo 21-yard run, JJ Molson kick (Drive: 6 plays, 59 yards, 1:44; UCLA 27–21)
- (7:22) ASU – Brandon Ruiz 22-yard field goal (Drive: 10 plays, 75 yards, 3:55; UCLA 27–24)
- (5:41) UCLA – Bolu Olorunfunmi 2-yard run, JJ Molson kick (Drive: 5 plays, 72 yards, 1:36; UCLA 34–24)
- (3:14) ASU – Brandon Ruiz 22-yard field goal (Drive: 8 plays, 72 yards, 2:21; UCLA 34–27)
- (2:13) ASU – Eno Benjamin 9-yard blocked punt return, Brandon Ruiz kick (Tied 34–34)

Fourth quarter

- (14:54) UCLA – Jordan Lasley 22-yard pass from Josh Rosen, JJ Molson kick (Drive: 7 plays, 75 yards, 2:19; UCLA 41–34)
- (9:38) UCLA – JJ Molson 20-yard field goal (Drive: 12 plays, 54 yards, 3:14; UCLA 44–34)
- (1:20) ASU – Brandon Ruiz 23-yard field goal (Drive: 13 plays, 93 yards, 3:57; UCLA 44–37)

Statistics	ASU	UCLA
First downs	29	25
Total yards	584	573
Rushing yards	61–294	33–192
Passing yards	290	381
Passing: Comp–Att–Int	21–37–1	25–45–1
Time of possession	36:08	23:52

Team	Category	Player	Statistics
Arizona State	Passing	Manny Wilkins	21/37, 290 yards, TD, INT
Arizona State	Rushing	Demario Richard	21 carries, 125 yards, TD
Arizona State	Receiving	N'Keal Harry	6 receptions, 95 yards, TD
UCLA	Passing	Josh Rosen	25/45, 381 yards, TD, INT
UCLA	Rushing	Bolu Olorunfunmi	15 carries, 79 yards, TD
UCLA	Receiving	Jordan Lasley	7 receptions, 162 yards, TD

=== at Oregon State ===
Arizona State Sun Devils (5–5) at Oregon State Beavers (1–9) – Game summary

Quarter	1	2	3	4	Total
Sun Devils	16	14	3	7	40
Beavers	0	7	3	14	24

at Reser Stadium • Corvallis, OR

- Date: November 18, 2017
- Game time: 1:00 p.m.
- Game weather: Foggy with clouds, 40 °F (4 °C)
- Game attendance: 50,485
- Referee: Chris Coyte
- TV announcers (Pac-12 Network): Ted Robinson (play-by-play), Yogi Roth (analyst), Jill Savage (sideline reporter)

Game information

First quarter

- (13:44) ASU – Kyle Williams 23-yard pass from Manny Wilkins, Brandon Ruiz kick (Drive: 4 plays, 69 yards, 1:16; Arizona State 7–0)
- (9:06) ASU – Curtis Hodges 1-yard pass from Manny Wilkins, Brandon Ruiz kick (Drive: 8 plays, 71 yards, 2:51; Arizona State 14–0)
- (1:18) ASU – Team safety (Arizona State 16–0)

Second quarter

- (14:54) ASU – Demario Richard 17-yard run, Brandon Ruiz kick (Drive: 5 plays, 54 yards, 1:15; Arizona State 23–0)
- (4:44) ASU – Demario Richard 1-yard run, Brandon Ruiz kick (Drive: 11 plays, 52 yards, 4:46; Arizona State 30–0)
- (0:59) OSU – Ryan Nall 1-yard run, Jordan Choukair kick (Drive: 8 plays, 79 yards, 3:38; Arizona State 30–7)

Third quarter

- (5:58) ASU – Brandon Ruiz 45-yard field goal (Drive: 11 plays, 59 yards, 5:00; Arizona State 33–7)
- (1:33) OSU – Jordan Choukair 31-yard field goal (Drive: 10 plays, 67 yards, 4:20; Arizona State 33–10)

Fourth quarter

- (13:36) ASU – Demario Richard 3-yard run, Brandon Ruiz kick (Drive: 7 plays, 78 yards, 2:50; Arizona State 40–10)
- (8:58) OSU – Trevorris Johnson 1-yard run, Jordan Choukair kick (Drive: 10 plays, 77 yards, 4:31; Arizona State 40–17)
- (7:27) OSU – Darell Garretson 4-yard run, Jordan Choukair kick (Drive: 6 plays, 53 yards, 1:29; Arizona State 40–24)

Statistics	ASU	OSU
First downs	24	23
Total yards	453	375
Rushing yards	49–286	33–106
Passing yards	167	269
Passing: Comp–Att–Int	12–19–0	26–37–2
Time of possession	27:32	32:28

Team	Category	Player	Statistics
Arizona State	Passing	Manny Wilkins	12/19, 167 yards, 2 TD
Arizona State	Rushing	Demario Richard	17 carries, 119 yards, 3 TD
Arizona State	Receiving	N'Keal Harry	3 receptions, 68 yards
Oregon State	Passing	Darell Garretson	26/37, 269 yards, 2 INT
Oregon State	Rushing	Ryan Nall	12 carries, 42 yards, TD
Oregon State	Receiving	Noah Togiai	5 receptions, 88 yards

=== vs Arizona ===
Arizona Wildcats (7–4) vs Arizona State Sun Devils (6–5) – Game summary

Quarter	1	2	3	4	Total
Wildcats	14	10	0	6	30
Sun Devils	7	7	21	7	42

at Sun Devil Stadium • Tempe, AZ

- Date: November 25, 2017
- Game time: 5:00 p.m.
- Game weather: Partly Cloudy, 84 °F (29 °C)
- Game attendance: 59,385
- Referee: Michael Mothershed
- TV announcers (Pac-12 Network): Roxy Bernstein (play-by-play), Yogi Roth (analyst), Jill Savage (sideline reporter)

Game information

First quarter

- (8:43) ARIZ – Zach Green 1-yard run, Josh Pollack kick (Drive: 10 plays, 73 yards, 4:29; Arizona 7–0)
- (4:38) ARIZ – Khalil Tate 1-yard run, Josh Pollack kick (Drive: 6 plays, 50 yards, 2:07; Arizona 14–7)
- (1:16) ASU – Kyle Williams 18-yard pass from Manny Wilkins, Brandon Ruiz kick (Drive: 9 plays, 87 yards, 3:17; Arizona 14–7)

Second quarter

- (9:36) ARIZ – Josh Pollack 24-yard field goal (Drive: 13 plays, 68 yards, 6:40; Arizona 17–7)
- (5:45) ASU – Kalen Ballage 1-yard run, Brandon Ruiz kick (Drive: 9 plays, 75 yards, 3:51; Arizona 17–14)
- (3:43) ARIZ – J.J. Taylor 15-yard run, Josh Pollack kick (Drive: 5 plays, 75 yards, 2:02; Arizona 24–14)

Third quarter

- (12:45) ASU – Demario Richard 1-yard run, Brandon Ruiz kick (Drive: 2 plays, 5 yards, 0:27; Arizona 24–21)
- (8:50) ASU – N'Keal Harry 5-yard pass from Manny Wilkins, Brandon Ruiz kick (Drive: 8 plays, 30 yards, 2:53; Arizona State 28–24)
- (2:18) ASU – Demario Richard 6-yard run, Brandon Ruiz kick (Drive: 8 plays, 75 yards, 3:16; Arizona State 35–24)

Fourth quarter

- (13:04) ARIZ – Brandon Dawkins 50-yard run, two-point pass failed (Drive: 6 plays, 86 yards, 2:13; Arizona State 35–30)
- (4:51) ASU – N'Keal Harry 9-yard pass from Manny Wilkins, Brandon Ruiz kick (Drive: 9 plays, 33 yards, 3:52; Arizona State 42–30)

Statistics	ARIZ	ASU
First downs	24	18
Total yards	439	390
Rushing yards	51–245	49–227
Passing yards	194	163
Passing: Comp–Att–Int	15–21–1	11–17–1
Time of possession	32:07	27:53

Team	Category	Player	Statistics
Arizona	Passing	Khalil Tate	11/13, 132 yards
Arizona	Rushing	J. J. Taylor	12 carries, 74 yards, TD
Arizona	Receiving	Shawn Poindexter	2 receptions, 53 yards
Arizona State	Passing	Manny Wilkins	11/17, 163 yards, 3 TD, INT
Arizona State	Rushing	Demario Richard	22 carries, 165 yards, 2 TD
Arizona State	Receiving	Frank Darby	1 reception, 48 yards

=== vs No. 24 NC State (Sun Bowl) ===
Arizona State Sun Devils (7–5) vs No. 24 NC State Wolfpack (8–4) – Game summary
(2017 Hyundai Sun Bowl)

Quarter	1	2	3	4	Total
Sun Devils	0	10	0	21	31
No. 24 Wolfpack	7	21	3	21	52

at Sun Bowl • El Paso, TX

- Date: December 29, 2017
- Game time: 1:00 p.m.
- Game weather: Clear skies, 64 °F (18 °C)
- Game attendance: 39,897
- Referee: Mike Cannon
- TV announcers (CBS): Brad Nessler (play-by-play), Gary Danielson (analyst), Allie LaForce (sideline reporter)

Game information

First Quarter

- (2:40) NCST – Nyheim Hines 5-yard run, Kyle Bambard kick (Drive: 15 plays, 87 yards, 6:46; NC State 7–0)

Second Quarter

- (14:13) NCST – Nyheim Hines 5-yard run, Kyle Bambard kick (Drive: 6 plays, 56 yards, 1:53; NC State 14–10)
- (8:06) ASU – Brandon Ruiz 24-yard field goal (Drive: 14 plays, 67 yards, 6:01; NC State 14–3)
- (4:42) NCST – Nyheim Hines 5-yard run, Kyle Bambard kick (Drive: 7 plays, 75 yards, 3:24; NC State 21–3)
- (2:08) ASU – N'Keal Harry 6-yard pass from Manny Wilkins, Brandon Ruiz kick (Drive: 7 plays, 72 yards, 2:29; NC State 21–10)
- (1:00) NCST – Jakobi Meyers 25-yard pass from Ryan Finley, Kyle Bambard kick (Drive: 5 plays, 49 yards, 1:07; NC State 28–10)

Third Quarter

- (8:20) NCST – Kyle Bambard 26-yard field goal (Drive: 4 plays, 4 yards, 1:58; NC State 31–10)

Fourth Quarter

- (14:54) NCST – Reggie Gallaspy 23-yard run, Kyle Bambard kick (Drive: 11 plays, 80 yards, 7:14; NC State 38–10)
- (9:52) ASU – Manny Wilkins 1-yard run, Brandon Ruiz kick (Drive: 12 plays, 76 yards, 4:46; NC State 38–17)
- (8:53) ASU – Kyle Williams 19-yard pass from Manny Wilkins, Brandon Ruiz kick (Drive: 4 plays, 45 yards, 0:55; NC State 38–24)
- (4:06) NCST – Jaylen Samuels 2-yard run, Kyle Bambard kick (Drive: 8 plays, 48 yards, 4:46; NC State 45–24)
- (2:13) ASU – Frank Darby 20-yard pass from Manny Wilkins, Brandon Ruiz kick (Drive: 6 plays, 80 yards, 1:45; NC State 45–31)
- (1:54) NCST – Reggie Gallaspy 1-yard run, Kyle Bambard kick (Drive: 2 plays, 7 yards, 0:08; NC State 52–31)

Statistics	ASU	NCST
First downs	24	23
Total yards	469	482
Rushing yards	30–117	43–164
Passing yards	352	318
Passing: Comp–Att–Int	25–40–3	24–29–0
Time of possession	25:31	34:29

Team	Category	Player	Statistics
Arizona State	Passing	Manny Wilkins	25/40, 352 yards, 3 TD, 3 INT
Arizona State	Rushing	Demario Richard	13 carries, 50 yards
Arizona State	Receiving	N'Keal Harry	9 receptions, 142 yards, TD
NC State	Passing	Ryan Finley	24/29, 318 yards, TD
NC State	Rushing	Nyheim Hines	16 carries, 72 yards, 3 TD
NC State	Receiving	Stephen Louis	3 receptions, 115 yards

NC State running back Nyheim Hines was named MVP.

== Personnel ==
=== Final roster ===
2017 Arizona State Sun Devils roster
Quarterbacks: 2 Brady White, (redshirt) Sophomore; 5 Manny Wilkins, (redshirt) Junior; 8 Blake Barnett, (redshirt) Sophomore; 14 Ryan Kelley, Freshman; 15 Dillon Sterling-Cole, Sophomore; 16 Kevin Brown, Freshman; Running backs: 3 Eno Benjamin, Freshman; 4 Demario Richard, Senior; 7 Kalen Ballage, Senior; 20 Trelon Smith, Freshman; 22 Nick Ralston, (redshirt) Sophomore; 35 Jacom Brimhall, Senior; -- Brandon Lamarche, (redshirt) Freshman; Wide receivers: 1 N'Keal Harry, Sophomore; 10 Kyle Williams, Sophomore; 12 John Humphrey, (redshirt) Sophomore; 14 Ryan Jenkins, (redshirt) Senior; 15 Jeremy Smith, (redshirt) Freshman; 16 Daniel Sanders-Effiong, Freshman; 17 Ryan Newsome, (redshirt) Sophomore; 21 Terrell Chatman, (redshirt) Sophomore; 83 Trent Gilbert, (redshirt) Sophomore; 84 Frank Darby, (redshirt) Freshman; 84 Tyler Eggers, Junior; 84 Trevor Russell, Freshman; 85 Andrew Noble, Freshman; 86 Curtis Hodges, Freshman; 89 Jalen Harvey, (redshirt) Junior	Tight ends: 9 Jay Jay Wilson, Junior; 48 Frank Ogas, (redshirt) Senior; 80 Kyle Remo, Sophomore; 80 Mark Walton, Freshman; 81 Jared Bubak, (redshirt) Freshman; 82 Josh Pokraka, Junior; 87 Tommy Hudson, (redshirt) Sophomore; 88 Ceejhay French-Love, Junior; 91 Michael Gombert, Freshman; 92 Alexander Otero, Sophomore; Offensive lineman: 51 Zach Robertson, (redshirt) Sophomore; 54 Connor Humphreys, (redshirt) Junior; 56 Alex Losoya, (redshirt) Sophomore; 58 Tyson Rising, (redshirt) Junior; 59 Quinn Bailey, (redshirt) Junior; 60 Kyle Breed, Freshman; 62 Jesse Cozens, Freshman; 65 A.J. McCollum, Senior; 66 Mason Schell, Freshman; 69 Jonathan Sanchez, Freshman; 70 Michael Tate, (redshirt) Freshman; 71 Steven Miller, (redshirt) Sophomore; 72 Cade Cote, (redshirt) Sophomore; 73 Cohl Cabral, Sophomore; 74 Corey Stephens, Freshman; 75 Tyler McClure, (redshirt) Senior; 76 Sam Jones, (redshirt) Junior; 77 Mason Walter, (redshirt) Sophomore; 78 Marshal Nathe, (redshirt) Freshman	Defensive line: 1 JoJo Wicker, Junior; 41 Tyler Johnson, Freshman; 45 George Lea, (redshirt) Sophomore; 55 Corey Smith, (redshirt) Senior; 57 Jordon Hoyt, (redshirt) Junior; 90 Tashon Smallwood, Senior; 91 Jamie Diaz, Sophomore; 93 Emanuel Dayries, (redshirt) Junior; 94 Christian Hill, Senior; 95 Renell Wren, (redshirt) Junior; 96 Jalen Bates, (redshirt) Sophomore; 97 Shannon Forman, Freshman; 98 D.J. Davidson, Freshman; 99 Dougladson Subtyl, (redshirt) Junior; -- Darius Slade, (redshirt) Junior; Linebackers: 2 Christian Sam, (redshirt) Junior; 3 D.J Calhoun, Senior; 4 Koron Crump, Senior; 20 Khaylan Kearse-Thomas, (redshirt) Sophomore; 31 Marcus Ball, (redshirt) Senior; 34 Kyle Soelle, Freshman; 39 Malik Lawal, (redshirt) Sophomore; 44 Alani Latu, (redshirt) Senior; 47 Loren Mondy, Freshman; 49 Bailey Huggins, Freshman; 50 Ochuko Duke, Junior; 52 Jared Francis, Freshman; 53 Parker Higgins, (redshirt) Freshman; -- Benjamin Winans, Freshman; 32 Abe Thompson, Sophomore	Defensive backs: 18 Langston Frederick, Freshman; 5 Kobe Williams, Sophomore; 6 Evan Fields, Freshman; 10 K.J Jarrell, Freshman; 13 Darian Kornay, Sophomore; 14 Alex Perry, Freshman; 16 Maurice Chandler, Senior; 17 J'Marcus Rhodes, Senior; 21 Chad Adams, Senior; 23 Tyler Whiley, (redshirt) Junior; 24 Chase Lucas, (redshirt) Freshman; 28 Cody French, Junior; 28 Demonte King, Junior; 30 Dasmond Tautalatasi, (redshirt) Junior; 37 Joey Bryant, (redshirt) Junior; 38 Deion Guignard, Junior; 43 Caleb McShanag, (redshirt) Freshman; 46 Kordell Caldwell, Freshman; 48 Jacobi Taylor, Freshman; Safeties: 26 Ty Thomas, Freshman; 35 Owen Rodgers, Junior; Fullback: 22 Mark Cosgrove, (redshirt) Junior; Place kickers: 1 Brandon Ruiz, Freshman; 43 John O'Brien, (redshirt) Junior; 45 Cristian Zendejas, Freshman; Punters: 36 Michael Sleep-Dalton, (redshirt) Sophomore; 8 Matthew Bazarevitsch, Freshman; Long snappers: 61 Joseph Reeves, Freshman; 63 Mitchell Fraboni, Senior; 64 Riley John, Sophomore

=== Coaching staff ===
Name	Position	Consecutive season at Arizona State in current position
Todd Graham	Head coach	6th year
Shawn Slocum	Assistant head coach	3rd Year
Phil Bennett	Defensive coordinator	1st Year
Billy Napier	Offensive coordinator	1st Year
Keith Patterson	Linebackers coach	4th Year
TJ Rushing	Defensive backs coach	2nd Year
John Simon	Running backs coach	2nd Year
Rob Sale	Offensive line coach	1st Year
Rob Likens	Wide receivers coach	1st Year
Michael Slater	Defensive line coach	1st Year

== Players in the 2018 NFL draft ==
The Sun Devils had three players selected in the 2018 NFL Draft.

Player	Position	Round	Pick	NFL club
Kalen Ballage	RB	4	131	Miami Dolphins
Christian Sam	LB	6	178	New England Patriots
Sam Jones	G	6	183	Denver Broncos
