= 2016 Arizona State Sun Devils football team =

American college football season

2016 Arizona State Sun Devils football
- Conference: Pac-12 Conference
- South Division
- Record: 5–7 (2–7 Pac-12)
- Head coach: Todd Graham (5th season)
- Offensive coordinator: Chip Lindsey (1st season)
- Offensive scheme: Spread
- Defensive coordinator: Keith Patterson (3rd season)
- Base defense: Hybrid attacking
- Home stadium: Sun Devil Stadium

2016 Pac-12 Conference football standings
	Conf.			Overall
Team	W		L	W		L
North Division
No. 4 Washington xy$^	8	–	1	12	–	2
Washington State	7	–	2	8	–	5
No. 12 Stanford	6	–	3	10	–	3
California	3	–	6	5	–	7
Oregon State	3	–	6	4	–	8
Oregon	2	–	7	4	–	8
South Division
No. 17 Colorado xy	8	–	1	10	–	4
No. 3 USC	7	–	2	10	–	3
No. 23 Utah	5	–	4	9	–	4
Arizona State	2	–	7	5	–	7
UCLA	2	–	7	4	–	8
Arizona	1	–	8	3	–	9
Championship: Washington 41, Colorado 10
^ – College Football Playoff participant; $ – Conference champion; x – Division champion/co-champions; y – Championship game participant; Rankings from AP Poll

The 2016 Arizona State Sun Devils football team represented Arizona State University in the 2016 NCAA Division I FBS football season. They were led by fifth-year head coach Todd Graham and played their home games at Sun Devil Stadium. They were a member of the South Division of the Pac-12 Conference. They started the season 5–1, and needed to win one more game to become bowl eligible. However, they lost each of their last six games and did not qualify to play in a bowl game. The low point came in their season finale against in-state rival Arizona. With bowl eligibility on the line, the Sun Devils gave up 511 rushing yards in their 56–35 loss. They finished the season 5–7, 2–7 in Pac-12 play to finish in a tie for fourth place in the South Division.

== Schedule ==
Date	Time	Opponent	Site	TV	Result	Attendance
September 3	8:00 pm	No. 18 (FCS) Northern Arizona*	Sun Devil Stadium; Tempe, AZ	P12N	W 44–13	45,300
September 10	7:00 pm	Texas Tech*	Sun Devil Stadium; Tempe, AZ	FS1	W 68–55	44,511
September 16	6:30 pm	at UTSA*	Alamodome; San Antonio, TX	ESPN2	W 32–28	29,035
September 24	7:00 pm	California	Sun Devil Stadium; Tempe, AZ	ESPN2	W 51–41	49,295
October 1	5:30 pm	at USC	Los Angeles Memorial Coliseum; Los Angeles, CA	FOX	L 20–41	71,214
October 8	7:30 pm	UCLA	Sun Devil Stadium; Tempe, AZ	ESPN2	W 23–20	48,509
October 15	5:00 pm	at Colorado	Folsom Field; Boulder, CO	P12N	L 16–40	48,588
October 22	7:00 pm	Washington State^{†}	Sun Devil Stadium; Tempe, AZ	P12N	L 32–37	50,582
October 29	1:00 pm	at Oregon	Autzen Stadium; Eugene, OR	P12N	L 35–54	53,898
November 10	7:30 pm	No. 13 Utah	Sun Devil Stadium; Tempe, AZ	FS1	L 26–49	48,220
November 19	4:30 pm	at No. 7 Washington	Husky Stadium; Seattle, WA	FOX	L 18–44	65,467
November 25	7:30 pm	at Arizona	Arizona Stadium; Tucson, AZ (rivalry/Territorial Cup)	ESPN	L 35–56	50,197
*Non-conference game; ^{†}Homecoming; Rankings from AP Poll released prior to the game; All times are in Pacific time

== Personnel ==
2016 Arizona State Sun Devils football team roster
Players
Coaches
Offense

Pos.	#	Name	Class
QB	18	Shawn Akina	Fr
TE	84	JD Alexander	Fr
G	59	Quinn Bailey	So
RB	7	Kalen Ballage	Jr
RB	35	Jacom Brimhall	Jr
TE	81	Jared Bubek	Fr
OT	88	Cohl Cabral	Fr
WR	21	Terrell Chatman	Fr
WR	38	Chaz Collins	Fr
OL	66	Brock Corbin	Fr
FB	22	Mark Cosgrove	Jr
OL	72	Cade Cote	Fr
WR	81	Frank Darby	Fr
TE	80	Raymond Epps	Jr
WR	89	Frederick Gammage	Sr
WR	32	Trent Gilbert	Fr
OT	57	Evan Goodman	Sr
WR	88	Daniel Groebner	Sr
WR	38	Manuel Harris	Fr
WR	1	N'Keal Harry	Fr
WR	82	Jalen Harvey	So
TE	87	Tommy Hudson	Fr
WR	29	John Humphrey	Fr
G	54	Conor Humphreys	So
RB	32	Gll'Scott Jackson	Fr
WR	19	Ellis Jefferson	Jr
OL		Daniel Jeffrey	Fr
WR	86	Ryan Jenkins	Jr
G	76	Sam Jones	So
TE	83	Kody Kohl	Sr
RB		Brandon LaMarche	Fr
RB	23	Jason Lewis
G	98	Alex Losoya	So
TE	88	Grant Martinez	Jr
C	75	Tyler McClure	Jr
C	65	A.J. McCollum	Jr
C	77	Stephon McCray	Sr
G	71	Steven Miller	Fr
G	78	Marshal Nathe	Fr
WR	17	Ryan Newsome	So
QB	3	Bryce Perkins	Fr
TE	82	Josh Pokraka	So
RB	22	Nick Ralston	Fr
RB	31	Gabriel Rees	So
RB	4	Demario Richard	Jr
OT	58	Tyson Rising	Jr
OT	51	Zach Robertson	Fr
WR	6	Cameron Smith	Jr
WR	34	Jack Smith	Fr
WR	84	Jeremy Smith	Fr
QB	7	Dillon Sterling-Cole	Fr
OL		Michael Tate	Fr
RB	24	Tre Turner	Fr
OT	79	Mason Walter	Fr
QB	2	Brady White	Fr
WR	12	Tim White	Sr
QB	5	Manny Wilkins	So
TE	9	Jay Jay Wilson	So

Defense

Pos.	#	Name	Class
S	21	Chad Adams	Jr
ILB	31	Marcus Ball	Jr
DE	96	Jalen Bates	Fr
LB	49	Richie Becerra	Jr
DE	97	Edmond Boateng	Sr
LB	3	DJ Calhoun	Jr
CB	16	Maurice Chandler	Jr
OLB	4	Koron Crump	Jr
DL	93	Emanuel Dayries	So
CB	15	Bryson Echols	Sr
ILB	58	Salamo Fiso	Sr
ILB	37	Coltin Gerhart	So
DB	10	Deion Guignard	So
CB	8	Gump Hayes	Sr
LB	53	Parker Higgins	Fr
DL	94	Christian Hill	Jr
DL	55	Jordan Hoyt	Jr
S	18	James Johnson	Jr
OLB	44	A.J. Latu	Jr
NG	41	Ami Latu	Sr
DB	14	Eric Lauderdale	Sr
OLB	39	Malik Lawal	Fr
NG	45	George Lea	Fr
CB	7	Chase Lucas	Fr
LB	51	Brandon Matthews	Sr
LB	52	Drew McIntyre	Fr
DB	43	Caleb McShanag	Fr
LB	43	Carlos Mendoza	Sr
S	28	Laiu Moeakiola	Sr
LB	48	Frank Ogas	Jr
CB	25	Kareem Orr	So
S	13	Armand Perry	So
S	17	J'Marcus Rhodes	Jr
CB	6	Robbie Robinson	Fr
S	35	Owen Rogers	So
ILB	2	Christian Sam	Jr
DT	90	Tashon Smallwood	Jr
LB	46	Colbe Smelser	Jr
NG	91	Corey Smith	Jr
S	30	Dasmond Tautalatasi	So
ILB	20	Khaylan Kearse-Thomas	So
LB	47	Matthew Thompson	Sr
DT	92	Tramel Topps	Sr
ILB	23	Tyler Whiley	So
DE	1	JoJo Wicker	So
S	5	Kyle Williams	Fr
DT	95	Renell Wren	So

Special teams

Pos.	#	Name	Class
LS	63	Mitchell Fraboni	Jr
PK	5	Zane Gonzalez	Sr
P	26	Matt Haack	Sr
LS	64	Riley John	Fr
PK	43	John O'Brien	So
P	36	Michael Sleep-Dalton	So
P	45	Greg Thomas	So

Head coach

- Todd Graham

Coordinators/assistant coaches

- DelVaughn Alexander
- Sam Bennett
- Graham Craig
- Jared Holley
- Chip Lindsey
- Jay Norvell
- Keith Patterson
- T. J. Rushing
- Drew Seumalo
- Joe Seumalo
- John Simon
- Shawn Slocum
- Chris Thomsen

Legend

- (C) Team captain
- (S) Suspended
- (I) Ineligible
- Injured
- Redshirt

Roster
Last update: 2016-Oct-31

== Rankings ==
Ranking movements Legend: ██ Increase in ranking ██ Decrease in ranking — = Not ranked RV = Received votes
	Week															
Poll	Pre	1	2	3	4	5	6	7	8	9	10	11	12	13	14	Final
AP	—	—	RV	RV	RV	RV	RV	RV	—	—	—	—	—	—	—	—
Coaches	—	—	RV	RV	RV	RV	24	RV	—	—	—	—	—	—	—	—
CFP	Not released									—	—	—	—	—	—	Not released

== Game summaries ==
=== vs Northern Arizona ===
Northern Arizona Lumberjacks (0–0) vs Arizona State Sun Devils (0–0) – Game summary

Quarter	1	2	3	4	Total
Lumberjacks	0	3	3	7	13
Sun Devils	7	3	10	24	44

at Sun Devil Stadium • Tempe, AZ

- Date: September 3, 2016
- Game time: 8:00 p.m.
- Game weather: Clear skies, 99 °F (37 °C)
- Game attendance: 45,300
- Referee: Mark Duddy
- TV announcers (Pac-12 Network): Guy Haberman (play-by-play), Evan Moore (analyst), Drea Avant (sideline reporter)

Game information

First quarter

- (12:58) ASU – Manny Wilkins 13-yard run, Zane Gonzalez kick (Drive: 7 plays, 44 yards, 2:02; Arizona State 7–0)

Second quarter

- (13:26) NAU – Griffin Roehler 25-yard field goal (Drive: 8 plays, 38 yards, 3:08; Arizona State 7–3)
- (1:26) ASU – Zane Gonzalez 33-yard field goal (Drive: 12 plays, 79 yards, 3:38; Arizona State 10–3)

Third quarter

- (10:51) NAU – Griffin Roehler 23-yard field goal (Drive: 9 plays, 69 yards, 4:09; Arizona State 10–6)
- (7:29) ASU – Zane Gonzalez 53-yard field goal (Drive: 8 plays, 30 yards, 3:22; Arizona State 13–6)
- (0:05) ASU – Demario Richard 2-yard run, Zane Gonzalez kick (Drive: 15 plays, 89 yards, 5:11; Arizona State 20–6)

Fourth quarter

- (10:51) ASU – N'Keal Harry 34-yard run, kick failed (Drive: 5 plays, 85 yards, 1:34; Arizona State 26–6)
- (10:39) NAU – Elijah Marks 87-yard pass from Case Cookus, Griffin Roehler kick (Drive: 1 play, 87 yards, 0:12; Arizona State 26–13)
- (8:10) ASU – Kalen Ballage 30-yard run, Manny Wilkins two-point pass to Kalen Ballage (Drive: 6 plays, 72 yards, 2:21; Arizona State 34–13)
- (4:48) ASU – Zane Gonzalez 45-yard field goal (Drive: 4 plays, 8 yards, 1:31; Arizona State 37–13)
- (2:46) ASU – Nick Ralston 12-yard run, Zane Gonzalez kick (Drive: 1 play, 12 yards, 0:04; Arizona State 44–13)

Statistics	NAU	ASU
First downs	16	27
Total yards	425	456
Rushing yards	34–56	46–276
Passing yards	369	180
Passing: Comp–Att–Int	23–33–0	20–27–1
Time of possession	33:34	26:26

Team	Category	Player	Statistics
Northern Arizona	Passing	Case Cookus	23/33, 369 yards, TD
Northern Arizona	Rushing	Kendyl Taylor	19 carries, 43 yards
Northern Arizona	Receiving	Elijah Marks	8 receptions, 174 yards, TD
Arizona State	Passing	Manny Wilkins	20/27, 180 yards, INT
Arizona State	Rushing	Manny Wilkins	14 carries, 89 yards, TD
Arizona State	Receiving	Tim White	9 receptions, 95 yards

=== vs Texas Tech ===
Texas Tech Red Raiders (1–0) vs Arizona State Sun Devils (1–0) – Game summary

Quarter	1	2	3	4	Total
Red Raiders	14	20	7	14	55
Sun Devils	9	28	14	17	68

at Sun Devil Stadium • Tempe, AZ

- Date: September 10, 2016
- Game time: 7:00 p.m.
- Game weather: Mostly clear, 101 °F (38 °C)
- Game attendance: 44,511
- Referee: Scott Campbell
- TV announcers (FS1): Joe Davis (play-by-play), Brady Quinn (analyst), Jenny Taft (sideline reporter)

Game information

First quarter

- (10:13) ASU – N'Keal Harry 10-yard pass from Manny Wilkins, Zane Gonzalez kick (Drive: 6 plays, 43 yards, 1:44; Arizona State 7–0)
- (7:12) TTU – Patrick Mahomes 1-yard run, Clayton Hatfield kick (Drive: 8 plays, 47 yards, 3:00; Tied 7–7)
- (5:33) ASU – Team safety (Arizona State 9–7)
- (1:14) TTU – Derrick Willies 59-yard pass from Patrick Mahomes, Clayton Hatfield kick (Drive: 6 plays, 98 yards, 1:46; Texas Tech 14–9)

Second quarter

- (13:17) ASU – Kalen Ballage 1-yard run, Zane Gonzalez kick (Drive: 7 plays, 75 yards, 2:57; Arizona State 16–14)
- (12:55) TTU – Justin Stockton 75-yard pass from Patrick Mahomes, Clayton Hatfield kick (Drive: 2 plays, 75 yards, 0:22; Texas Tech 21–16)
- (11:18) ASU – Kalen Ballage 39-yard pass from Manny Wilkins, Zane Gonzalez kick (Drive: 4 plays, 85 yards, 1:24; Arizona State 23–21)
- (8:30) ASU – Kalen Ballage 1-yard run, Zane Gonzalez kick (Drive: 5 plays, 50 yards, 1:53; Arizona State 30–21)
- (5:21) TTU – Dylan Cantrell 11-yard pass from Patrick Mahomes, kick failed (Drive: 9 plays, 75 yards, 3:09; Arizona State 30–27)
- (2:17) ASU – Kalen Ballage 4-yard run, Zane Gonzalez kick (Drive: 9 plays, 74 yards, 2:55; Arizona State 37–27)
- (0:53) TTU – Jonathan Giles 13-yard pass from Patrick Mahomes, Clayton Hatfield kick (Drive: 9 plays, 75 yards, 1:24; Arizona State 37–34)

Third quarter

- (11:45) TTU – Justin Stockton 1-yard run, Clayton Hatfield kick (Drive: 9 plays, 75 yards, 3:15; Texas Tech 41–37)
- (8:32) ASU – Kalen Ballage 2-yard run, Zane Gonzalez kick (Drive: 7 plays, 84 yards, 3:08; Arizona State 44–41)
- (0:43) ASU – Kalen Ballage 7-yard run, Zane Gonzalez kick (Drive: 15 plays, 80 yards, 5:00; Arizona State 51–41)

Fourth quarter

- (10:57) ASU – Kalen Ballage 1-yard run, Zane Gonzalez kick (Drive: 1 play, 1 yard, 0:04; Arizona State 58–41)
- (9:23) TTU – Demarcus Felton 5-yard run, Clayton Hatfield kick (Drive: 6 plays, 75 yards, 1:34; Arizona State 58–48)
- (9:11) ASU – Kalen Ballage 75-yard run, Zane Gonzalez kick (Drive: 1 play, 75 yards, 0:12; Arizona State 65–48)
- (8:16) TTU – Cameron Batson 66-yard pass from Patrick Mahomes, Clayton Hatfield kick (Drive: 4 plays, 75 yards, 0:55; Arizona State 65–55)
- (3:04) ASU – Zane Gonzalez 43-yard field goal (Drive: 11 plays, 53 yards, 5:06; Arizona State 68–55)

Statistics	TTU	ASU
First downs	28	34
Total yards	612	652
Rushing yards	22–72	53–301
Passing yards	540	351
Passing: Comp–Att–Int	38–53–2	28–37–0
Time of possession	23:46	36:14

Team	Category	Player	Statistics
Texas Tech	Passing	Patrick Mahomes	38/53, 540 yards, 5 TD, 2 INT
Texas Tech	Rushing	Patrick Mahomes	11 carries, 44 yards, TD
Texas Tech	Receiving	Cameron Batson	9 receptions, 148 yards, TD
Arizona State	Passing	Manny Wilkins	28/37, 351 yards, 2 TD
Arizona State	Rushing	Kalen Ballage	13 carries, 137 yards, 7 TD
Arizona State	Receiving	N'Keal Harry	6 receptions, 72 yards, TD

=== at UTSA ===
Arizona State Sun Devils (2–0) at UTSA Roadrunners (1–1) – Game summary

Quarter	1	2	3	4	Total
Sun Devils	3	9	3	17	32
Roadrunners	14	0	14	0	28

at Alamodome • San Antonio, TX

- Date: September 16, 2016
- Game time: 6:30 p.m.
- Game weather: None (Indoor stadium)
- Game attendance: 29,035
- Referee: Rodney Burnette
- TV announcers (ESPN2): Mark Neely (play-by-play), Ray Bentley (analyst)

Game information

First quarter

- (12:09) ASU – Zane Gonzalez 54-yard field goal (Drive: 8 plays, 30 yards, 2:51; Arizona State 3–0)
- (5:58) UTSA – Jabryce Taylor 10-yard pass from Dalton Sturm, Victor Falcon kick (Drive: 11 plays, 75 yards, 6:11; UTSA 7–3)
- (1:43) UTSA – Jalen Rhodes 11-yard pass from Dalton Sturm, Victor Falcon kick (Drive: 3 plays, 14 yards, 0:56; UTSA 14–3)

Second quarter

- (8:02) ASU – Zane Gonzalez 54-yard field goal (Drive: 7 plays, 55 yards, 1:09; UTSA 14–6)
- (0:03) ASU – N'Keal Harry 27-yard pass from Manny Wilkins, two-point pass failed (Drive: 12 plays, 91 yards, 3:06; UTSA 14–12)

Third quarter

- (12:25) UTSA – Dalton Sturm 34-yard run, Victor Falcon kick (Drive: 5 plays, 92 yards, 2:35; UTSA 21–12)
- (8:20) UTSA – Shaq Williams 24-yard pass from Dalton Sturm, Victor Falcon kick (Drive: 1 play, 24 yards, 0:08; UTSA 28–12)
- (4:58) ASU – Zane Gonzalez 45-yard field goal (Drive: 8 plays, 37 yards, 3:22; UTSA 28–15)

Fourth quarter

- (14:55) ASU – Zane Gonzalez 26-yard field goal (Drive: 11 plays, 40 yards, 3:59; UTSA 28–18)
- (11:40) ASU – Fred Gammage 45-yard pass from Manny Wilkins, Zane Gonzalez kick (Drive: 4 plays, 68 yards, 1:04; UTSA 28–25)
- (3:15) ASU – Kalen Ballage 2-yard run, Zane Gonzalez kick (Drive: 9 plays, 58 yards, 3:50; Arizona State 32–28)

Statistics	ASU	UTSA
First downs	25	16
Total yards	469	322
Rushing yards	48–205	30–93
Passing yards	264	229
Passing: Comp–Att–Int	15–31–1	19–37–0
Time of possession	30:07	29:53

Team	Category	Player	Statistics
Arizona State	Passing	Manny Wilkins	15/31, 264 yards, 2 TD, INT
Arizona State	Rushing	Demario Richard	22 carries, 95 yards
Arizona State	Receiving	Cameron Smith	3 receptions, 88 yards
UTSA	Passing	Dalton Strum	19/37, 229 yards, 3 TD
UTSA	Rushing	Dalton Strum	15 carries, 82 yards, TD
UTSA	Receiving	Jarveon Williams	5 receptions, 81 yards

=== vs California ===
California Golden Bears (2–1) vs Arizona State Sun Devils (3–0) – Game summary

Quarter	1	2	3	4	Total
Golden Bears	7	17	3	14	41
Sun Devils	3	7	10	31	51

at Sun Devil Stadium • Tempe, AZ

- Date: September 24, 2016
- Game time: 7:00 p.m.
- Game weather: Clear Skies, 84 °F (29 °C)
- Game attendance: 49,295
- Referee: Steve Strimling
- TV announcers (ESPN2): Mike Patrick (play-by-play), Ed Cunningham (analyst), Jerry Punch (sideline reporter)

Game information

First quarter

- (10:00) CAL – Demetris Robertson 19-yard pass from Davis Webb, Matt Anderson kick (Drive: 9 plays, 98 yards, 2:37; California 7–0)
- (0:56) ASU – Zane Gonzalez 35-yard field goal (Drive: 8 plays, 41 yards, 2:28; California 7–3)

Second quarter

- (11:34) CAL – Chad Hansen 20-yard pass from Davis Webb, Matt Anderson kick (Drive: 12 plays, 75 yards, 4:22; California 14–3)
- (3:19) CAL – Matt Anderson 20-yard field goal (Drive: 10 plays, 84 yards, 2:50; California 17–3)
- (1:24) ASU – Manny Wilkins 8-yard run, Zane Gonzalez kick (Drive: 6 plays, 75 yards, 1:55; California 17–10)
- (0:18) CAL – Brandon Singleton 23-yard pass from Davis Webb, Matt Anderson kick (Drive: 6 plays, 82 yards, 1:02; California 24–10)

Third quarter

- (11:19) ASU – Manny Wilkins 1-yard run, Zane Gonzalez kick (Drive: 11 plays, 75 yards, 3:41; California 24–17)
- (9:01) CAL – Matt Anderson 47-yard field goal (Drive: 8 plays, 55 yards, 2:14; California 27–17)
- (6:15) ASU – Zane Gonzalez 40-yard field goal (Drive: 8 plays, 49 yards, 2:46; California 27–20)

Fourth quarter

- (9:44) ASU – Manny Wilkins 3-yard run, Zane Gonzalez kick (Drive: 7 plays, 62 yards, 2:19; Tied 27–27)
- (9:06) CAL – Tre Watson 74-yard pass from Davis Webb, Matt Anderson kick (Drive: 3 plays, 75 yards, 0:38; California 34–27)
- (6:21) ASU – Jay Jay Wilson 30-yard pass from Manny Wilkins, Brandon Ruiz kick (Drive: 8 plays, 77 yards, 2:39; Tied 34–34)
- (3:17) ASU – Zane Gonzalez 23-yard field goal (Drive: 7 plays, 10 yards, 2:55; Arizona State 37–34)
- (2:52) ASU – Laiu Moeakiola 28-yard interception return, Zane Gonzalez kick (Arizona State 44–34)
- (0:54) CAL – Demetris Robertson 26-yard pass from Davis Webb, Matt Anderson kick (Drive: 12 plays, 75 yards, 1:58; Arizona State 44–41)
- (0:48) ASU – DJ Calhoun 42-yard kickoff return, Zane Gonzalez kick (Arizona State 51–41)

Statistics	CAL	ASU
First downs	29	23
Total yards	637	454
Rushing yards	37–159	50–164
Passing yards	478	290
Passing: Comp–Att–Int	32–56–2	21–30–1
Time of possession	29:16	30:44

Team	Category	Player	Statistics
California	Passing	Davis Webb	32/56, 478 yards, 5 TD, 2 INT
California	Rushing	Khalfani Muhammad	12 carries, 84 yards
California	Receiving	Chad Hansen	10 receptions, 110 yards, TD
Arizona State	Passing	Manny Wilkins	21/30, 290 yards, TD, INT
Arizona State	Rushing	Manny Wilkins	23 carries, 72 yards, 3 TD
Arizona State	Receiving	Tim White	6 receptions, 86 yards

=== at USC ===
Arizona State Sun Devils (4–0) at USC Trojans (1–3) – Game summary

Quarter	1	2	3	4	Total
Sun Devils	6	0	0	14	20
Trojans	7	20	14	0	41

at Los Angeles Memorial Coliseum • Los Angeles, CA

- Date: October 1, 2016
- Game time: 5:30 p.m.
- Game weather: Clear skies, 77 °F (25 °C)
- Game attendance: 71,214
- Referee: Michael Mothershed
- TV announcers (Fox): Joe Davis (play-by-play), Brady Quinn (analyst), Jenny Taft (sideline reporter)

Game information

First quarter

- (9:50) ASU – Zane Gonzalez 40-yard field goal (Drive: 12 plays, 59 yards, 5:10; Arizona State 3–0)
- (4:35) USC – JuJu Smith-Schuster 5-yard pass from Sam Darnold, Matt Boermeester kick (Drive: 8 plays, 95 yards, 2:30; USC 7–3)
- (0:44) ASU – Zane Gonzalez 34-yard field goal (Drive: 8 plays, 59 yards, 3:51; USC 7–6)

Second quarter

- (9:58) USC – JuJu Smith-Schuster 3-yard pass from Sam Darnold, Matt Boermeester kick (Drive: 9 plays, 66 yards, 2:51; USC 14–6)
- (4:39) USC – Matt Boermeester 49-yard field goal (Drive: 6 plays, 27 yards, 1:46; USC 17–6)
- (2:30) USC – Justin Davis 37-yard run, Matt Boermeester kick (Drive: 1 play, 37 yards, 0:11; USC 24–6)
- (0:20) USC – Matt Boermeester 46-yard field goal (Drive: 6 plays, 42 yards, 0:47; USC 27–6)

Third quarter

- (11:11) USC – JuJu Smith-Schuster 67-yard pass from Sam Darnold, Matt Boermeester kick (Drive: 2 plays, 67 yards, 0:20; USC 34–6)
- (8:24) USC – Sam Darnold 3-yard run, Matt Boermeester kick (Drive: 5 plays, 67 yards, 1:55; USC 41–6)

Fourth quarter

- (8:37) ASU – Raymond Epps 13-yard pass from Brady White, Zane Gonzalez kick (Drive: 6 plays, 80 yards, 2:20; USC 41–13)
- (1:51) ASU – Nick Ralston 10-yard run, Zane Gonzalez kick (Drive: 9 plays, 66 yards, 4:08; USC 41–20)

Statistics	ASU	USC
First downs	16	23
Total yards	303	523
Rushing yards	33–75	33–157
Passing yards	228	366
Passing: Comp–Att–Int	19–37–1	24–36–0
Time of possession	30:27	29:33

Team	Category	Player	Statistics
Arizona State	Passing	Manny Wilkins	13/24, 148 yards, INT
Arizona State	Rushing	Nick Ralston	12 carries, 46 yards, TD
Arizona State	Receiving	Tim White	7 receptions, 84 yards
USC	Passing	Sam Darnold	23/33, 352 yards, 3 TD
USC	Rushing	Justin Davis	14 carries, 123 yards, TD
USC	Receiving	JuJu Smith-Schuster	7 receptions, 123 yards, 3 TD

=== vs UCLA ===
UCLA Bruins (3–2) vs Arizona State Sun Devils (4–1) – Game summary

Quarter	1	2	3	4	Total
Bruins	0	3	10	7	20
Sun Devils	3	0	17	3	23

at Sun Devil Stadium • Tempe, AZ

- Date: October 8, 2016
- Game time: 7:30 p.m.
- Game weather: Mostly clear, 90 °F (32 °C)
- Game attendance: 48,509
- Referee: Chris Coyte
- TV announcers (ESPN2): Allen Bestwick (play-by-play), Mike Bellotti (analyst), Kris Budden (sideline reporter)

Game information

First quarter

- (7:54) ASU – Zane Gonzalez 35-yard field goal (Drive: 4 plays, 6 yards, 1:22; Arizona State 3–0)

Second quarter

- (14:56) UCLA – JJ Molson 38-yard field goal (Drive: 8 plays, 34 yards, 3:13; Tied 3–3)

Third quarter

- (12:10) ASU – Zane Gonzalez 23-yard field goal (Drive: 4 plays, −1 yards, 1:41; Arizona State 6–3)
- (8:29) ASU – Demario Richard 5-yard run, Zane Gonzalez kick (Drive: 7 plays, 57 yards, 1:55; Arizona State 13–3)
- (6:02) UCLA – JJ Molson 19-yard field goal (Drive: 7 plays, 73 yards, 2:27; Arizona State 13–6)
- (3:08) UCLA – Jordan Lasley 52-yard pass from Josh Rosen, JJ Molson kick (Drive: 5 plays, 67 yards, 1:26; Tied 13–13)
- (0:00) ASU – N'Keal Harry 14-yard pass from Brady White, Zane Gonzalez kick (Drive: 7 plays, 75 yards, 3:08; Arizona State 20–13)

Fourth quarter

- (12:28) ASU – Zane Gonzalez 46-yard field goal (Drive: 4 plays, 4 yards, 1:23; Arizona State 23–13)
- (11:10) UCLA – Nate Iese 18-yard pass from Josh Rosen, JJ Molson kick (Drive: 6 plays, 75 yards, 1:18; Arizona State 23–20)

Statistics	UCLA	ASU
First downs	18	15
Total yards	443	275
Rushing yards	23– -1	34–79
Passing yards	444	196
Passing: Comp–Att–Int	27–54–3	20–39–2
Time of possession	30:40	29:20

Team	Category	Player	Statistics
UCLA	Passing	Josh Rosen	24/43, 400 yards, 2 TD, INT
UCLA	Rushing	Nate Starks	14 carries, 31 yards
UCLA	Receiving	Austin Roberts	3 receptions, 106 yards
Arizona State	Passing	Brady White	19/36, 179 yards, TD, INT
Arizona State	Rushing	Demario Richard	15 carries, 62 yards, TD
Arizona State	Receiving	Tim White	11 receptions, 123 yards

=== at Colorado ===
Arizona State Sun Devils (5–1) at Colorado Buffaloes (4–2) – Game summary

Quarter	1	2	3	4	Total
Sun Devils	7	3	3	3	16
Buffaloes	7	16	10	7	40

at Folsom Field • Boulder, CO

- Date: October 15, 2016
- Game time: 5:00 p.m.
- Game weather: Mostly Clear, 79 °F (26 °C)
- Game attendance: 48,588
- Referee: Land Clark
- TV announcers (Pac-12 Network): Roxy Bernstein (play-by-play), Anthony Herron (analyst), Lewis Johnson (sideline reporter)

Game information

First quarter

- (11:16) COLO – Kyle Evans 16-yard run, Davis Price kick (Drive: 10 plays, 81 yards, 2:49; Colorado 7–0)
- (2:48) ASU – Kody Kohl 5-yard pass from Manny Wilkins, Zane Gonzalez kick (Drive: 5 plays, 31 yards, 2:22; Tied 7–7)

Second quarter

- (12:54) COLO – Davis Price 20-yard field goal (Drive: 12 plays, 72 yards, 4:54; Colorado 10–7)
- (10:57) ASU – Zane Gonzalez 51-yard field goal (Drive: 5 plays, 42 yards, 1:57; Tied 10–10)
- (9:11) COLO – Sefo Liufau 3-yard run, Davis Price kick (Drive: 4 plays, 75 yards, 1:46; Colorado 16–10)
- (4:47) COLO – Phillip Lindsay 13-yard run, kick failed (Drive: 8 plays, 56 yards, 2:10; Colorado 23–10)

Third quarter

- (14:48) COLO – Phillip Lindsay 75-yard run, Davis Price kick (Drive: 1 play, 75 yards, 0:12; Colorado 30–10)
- (10:50) ASU – Zane Gonzalez 50-yard field goal (Drive: 4 plays, −2 yards, 1:32; Colorado 30–13)
- (1:50) COLO – Chris Graham 36-yard field goal (Drive: 12 plays, 62 yards, 4:28; Colorado 33–13)

Fourth quarter

- (8:54) ASU – Zane Gonzalez 59-yard field goal (Drive: 4 plays, −9 yards, 1:00; Colorado 33–16)
- (0:40) COLO – Phillip Lindsay 4-yard run, Chris Graham kick (Drive: 8 plays, 47 yards, 4:48; Colorado 40–16)

Statistics	ASU	COLO
First downs	7	27
Total yards	199	580
Rushing yards	28–50	52–315
Passing yards	149	265
Passing: Comp–Att–Int	13–35–1	23–32–0
Time of possession	26:24	33:36

Team	Category	Player	Statistics
Arizona State	Passing	Manny Wilkins	13/35, 149 yards, TD, INT
Arizona State	Rushing	Demario Richard	10 carries, 59 yards
Arizona State	Receiving	Tim White	5 receptions, 97 yards
Colorado	Passing	Sefo Liuafau	23/31, 265 yards
Colorado	Rushing	Phillip Lindsay	26 carries, 219 yards, 3 TD
Colorado	Receiving	Bobo Bryce	6 receptions, 110 yards

=== vs Washington State ===
Washington State Cougars (4–2) vs Arizona State Sun Devils (5–2) – Game summary

Quarter	1	2	3	4	Total
Cougars	0	17	14	6	37
Sun Devils	7	7	7	11	32

at Sun Devil Stadium • Tempe, AZ

- Date: October 22, 2016
- Game time: 7:00 p.m.
- Game weather: Mostly clear skies, 92 °F (33 °C)
- Game attendance: 50,582
- Referee: Michael Mothershed
- TV announcers (Pac-12 Network): Roxy Bernstein (play-by-play), Anthony Herron (analyst), Lewis Johnson (sideline reporter)

Game information

First quarter

- (10:25) ASU – Manny Wilkins 3-yard run, Zane Gonzalez kick (Drive: 11 plays, 59 yards, 4:35; Arizona State 7–0)

Second quarter

- (11:03) WSU – Erik Powell 29-yard field goal (Drive: 13 plays, 75 yards, 4:57; Arizona State 7–3 )
- (8:56) ASU – Kalen Ballage 52-yard run, Zane Gonzalez kick (Drive: 5 plays, 75 yards, 2:07; Arizona State 14–3)
- (8:41) WSU – Robert Taylor 100-yard kickoff return, Erik Powell kick (Arizona State 14–10)
- (0:57) WSU – Tavares Martin Jr. 9-yard pass from Luke Falk, Erik Powell kick (Drive: 9 plays, 77 yards, 4:46; Washington State 17–14)

Third quarter

- (11:26) WSU – Gerard Wicks 3-yard run, Erik Powell kick (Drive: 10 plays, 75 yards, 3:34; Washington State 24–14)
- (4:32) WSU – Jamal Morrow 3-yard pass from Luke Falk, Erik Powell kick (Drive: 9 plays, 74 yards, 4:18; Washington State 31–14)
- (0:00) ASU – Demario Richard 1-yard run, Zane Gonzalez kick (Drive: 10 plays, 81 yards, 4:26; Washington State 31–21)

Fourth quarter

- (13:27) WSU – Gabe Marks 52-yard pass from Luke Falk, kick failed (Drive: 7 plays, 88 yards, 1:33; Washington State 37–21)
- (11:15) ASU – Tim White 70-yard punt return, Fred Gammage two-point pass to Kody Kohl (Washington State 37–29)
- (4:36) ASU – Zane Gonzalez 29-yard field goal (Drive: 11 plays, 36 yards, 4:46; Washington State 37–32)

Statistics	WSU	ASU
First downs	24	12
Total yards	346	280
Rushing yards	19– -52	35–113
Passing yards	398	167
Passing: Comp–Att–Int	42–53–0	14–24–0
Time of possession	34:28	25:32

Team	Category	Player	Statistics
Washington State	Passing	Luke Falk	42/53, 398 yards, 3 TD
Washington State	Rushing	Jamal Morrow	4 carries, 17 yards
Washington State	Receiving	Gabe Marks	8 receptions, 107 yards, TD
Arizona State	Passing	Dillon Sterling-Cole	7/16, 86 yards
Arizona State	Rushing	Kalen Ballage	12 carries, 82 yards, TD
Arizona State	Receiving	N'Keal Harry	6 receptions, 76 yards

=== at Oregon ===
Arizona State Sun Devils (5–3) at Oregon Ducks (2–5) – Game summary

Quarter	1	2	3	4	Total
Sun Devils	14	0	8	13	35
Ducks	17	13	3	21	54

at Autzen Stadium • Eugene, OR

- Date: October 29, 2016
- Game time: 1:00 p.m.
- Game weather: Partly Cloudy, 61 °F (16 °C)
- Game attendance: 53,898
- Referee: Terry Leyden
- TV announcers (Pac-12 Network): Roxy Bernstein (play-by-play), Anthony Herron (analyst), Lewis Johnson (sideline reporter)

Game information

First quarter

- (12:11) ORE – Pharaoh Brown 72-yard pass from Justin Herbert, Aidan Schneider kick (Drive: 3 plays, 79 yards, 1:11; Oregon 7–0)
- (9:49) ASU – Kalen Ballage 12-yard run, Zane Gonzalez kick (Drive: 6 plays, 75 yards, 2:22; Tied 7–7)
- (7:32) ORE – Charles Nelson 31-yard pass from Justin Herbert, Aidan Schneider kick (Drive: 8 plays, 75 yards, 2:17; Oregon 14–7)
- (2:53) ORE – Aidan Schneider 36-yard field goal (Drive: 9 plays, 60 yards, 2:52; Oregon 17–7)
- (0:11) ASU – Dillon Sterling-Cole 1-yard run, Zane Gonzalez kick (Drive: 8 plays, 70 yards, 2:42; Oregon 17–14)

Second quarter

- (12:31) ORE – Aidan Schneider 37-yard field goal (Drive: 9 plays, 55 yards, 2:40; Oregon 20–14)
- (5:29) ORE – Aidan Schneider 30-yard field goal (Drive: 10 plays, 68 yards, 3:53; Oregon 23–14)
- (0:09) ORE – Pharaoh Brown 4-yard pass from Justin Herbert, Aidan Schneider kick (Drive: 3 plays, 32 yards, 0:24; Oregon 30–14)

Third quarter

- (4:56) ASU – Kalen Ballage 15-yard run, Dillon Sterling-Cole two-point pass to Kalen Ballage (Drive: 9 plays, 77 yards, 3:11; Oregon 30–22)
- (0:28) ORE – Aidan Schneider 23-yard field goal (Drive: 6 plays, 49 yards, 1:17; Oregon 33–22)

Fourth quarter

- (12:52) ASU – N'Keal Harry 9-yard pass from Dillon Sterling-Cole, two-point pass failed (Drive: 8 plays, 73 yards, 2:36; Oregon 33–28)
- (10:43) ORE – Johnny Mundt 53-yard pass from Justin Herbert, Aidan Schneider kick (Drive: 5 plays, 64 yards, 2:09; Oregon 40–28)
- (6:39) ASU – Kody Kohl 3-yard pass from Kalen Ballage, Zane Gonzalez kick (Drive: 2 plays, 55 yards, 0:42; Oregon 40–35)
- (6:06) ORE – Tony Brooks-James 58-yard run, Aidan Schneider kick (Drive: 3 plays, 75 yards, 0:33; Oregon 47–35)
- (2:36) ORE – Royce Freeman 10-yard run, Aidan Schneider kick (Drive: 3 plays, 30 yards, 1:16; Oregon 54–35)

Statistics	ASU	ORE
First downs	22	30
Total yards	468	734
Rushing yards	36–139	46–245
Passing yards	329	489
Passing: Comp–Att–Int	23–40–3	31–42–0
Time of possession	27:08	32:52

Team	Category	Player	Statistics
Arizona State	Passing	Dillon Sterling-Cole	21/38, 302 yards, TD, 3 INT
Arizona State	Rushing	Kalen Ballage	18 carries, 62 yards, 2 TD
Arizona State	Receiving	Kalen Ballage	6 receptions, 105 yards
Oregon	Passing	Justin Herbert	31/42, 489 yards, 4 TD
Oregon	Rushing	Tony Brooks-James	9 carries, 132 yards, TD
Oregon	Receiving	Pharaoh Brown	7 receptions, 129 yards, 2 TD

=== vs No. 13 Utah ===
No. 13 Utah Utes (7–2) vs Arizona State Sun Devils (5–4) – Game summary

Quarter	1	2	3	4	Total
No. 13 Utes	0	21	7	21	49
Sun Devils	13	7	6	0	26

at Sun Devil Stadium • Tempe, AZ

- Date: November 10, 2016
- Game time: 7:30 p.m.
- Game weather: Mostly clear skies, 74 °F (23 °C)
- Game attendance: 48,220
- Referee: Steve Strimling
- TV announcers (FS1): Joe Davis (play-by-play), Brady Quinn (analyst), Jenny Taft (sideline reporter)

Game information

First quarter

- (7:18) ASU – Zane Gonzalez 24-yard field goal (Drive: 9 plays, 42 yards, 2:51; Arizona State 3–0)
- (4:09) ASU – Kalen Ballage 2-yard run, Zane Gonzalez kick (Drive: 5 plays, 67 yards, 1:25; Arizona State 10–0)
- (0:40) ASU – Zane Gonzalez 36-yard field goal (Drive: 7 plays, 68 yards, 2:48; Arizona State 13–0)

Second quarter

- (13:43) UTAH – Raelon Singleton 64-yard pass from Troy Williams, Andy Phillips kick (Drive: 4 plays, 75 yards, 1:57; Arizona State 13–7)
- (10:13) UTAH – Siaosi Wilson 27-yard pass from Troy Williams, Andy Phillips kick (Drive: 4 plays, 54 yards, 1:13; Utah 14–13)
- (3:36) ASU – N'Keal Harry 31-yard run, Zane Gonzalez kick (Drive: 6 plays, 92 yards, 2:34; Arizona State 20–14)
- (0:22) UTAH – Raelon Singleton 17-yard pass from Troy Williams, Andy Phillips kick (Drive: 11 plays, 82 yards, 3:02; Utah 21–20)

Third quarter

- (9:41) UTAH – Joe Williams 82-yard run, Andy Phillips kick (Drive: 1 play, 82 yards, 0:14; Utah 28–20)
- (2:02) ASU – Tim White 12-yard pass from Manny Wilkins, two-point pass failed (Drive: 10 plays, 62 yards, 4:07; Utah 28–26)

Fourth quarter

- (11:48) UTAH – Raelon Singleton 24-yard pass from Troy Williams, Andy Phillips kick (Drive: 10 plays, 75 yards, 5:14; Utah 35–26)
- (5:46) UTAH – Chase Hansen 34-yard inteception return, Andy Phillips kick (Utah 42–26)
- (3:09) UTAH – Joe Williams 40-yard run, Andy Phillips kick (Drive: 3 plays, 46 yards, 1:34; Utah 49–26)

Statistics	UTAH	ASU
First downs	22	18
Total yards	497	396
Rushing yards	22–201	47–41
Passing yards	296	355
Passing: Comp–Att–Int	21–37–0	20–32–2
Time of possession	23:54	36:06

Team	Category	Player	Statistics
Utah	Passing	Troy Williams	21/37, 296 yards, 4 TD
Utah	Rushing	Joe Williams	15 carries, 181 yards, 2 TD
Utah	Receiving	Raelon Singleton	4 receptions, 116 yards, 3 TD
Arizona State	Passing	Manny Wilkins	19/31, 309 yards, TD, 2 INT
Arizona State	Rushing	Kalen Ballage	15 carries, 46 yards, TD
Arizona State	Receiving	Kalen Ballage	7 receptions, 118 yards

=== at No. 7 Washington ===
Arizona State Sun Devils (5–5) at No. 7 Washington Huskies (9–1) – Game summary

Quarter	1	2	3	4	Total
Sun Devils	0	0	3	15	18
No. 7 Huskies	3	21	6	14	44

at Husky Stadium • Seattle, WA

- Date: November 19, 2016
- Game time: 4:30 p.m.
- Game weather: Mostly Cloudy, 54 °F (12 °C)
- Game attendance: 65,467
- Referee: Land Clark
- TV announcers (Fox): Joe Davis (play-by-play), Brady Quinn (analyst), Jenny Taft (sideline reporter)

Game information

First quarter

- (6:49) WASH – Cameron Van Winkle 30-yard field goal (Drive: 4 plays, −2 yards, 1:25; Washington 3–0)

Second quarter

- (13:08) WASH – Chico McClatcher 75-yard pass from Jake Browning, Cameron Van Winkle kick (Drive: 2 plays, 80 yards, 0:47; Washington 10–0)
- (4:08) WASH – Dante Pettis 46-yard pass from Jake Browning, Cameron Van Winkle kick (Drive: 4 plays, 84 yards, 1:58; Washington 17–0)
- (0:16) WASH – Lavon Coleman 1-yard run, Cameron Van Winkle kick (Drive: 7 plays, 62 yards, 1:53; Washington 24–0)

Third quarter

- (9:49) WASH – Cameron Van Winkle 22-yard field goal (Drive: 14 plays, 70 yards, 5:11; Washington 27–0)
- (5:24) WASH – Cameron Van Winkle 24-yard field goal (Drive: 9 plays, 60 yards, 2:27; Washington 30–0)
- (2:17) ASU – Zane Gonzalez 50-yard field goal (Drive: 7 plays, 43 yards, 3:07; Washington 30–3)

Fourth quarter

- (10:27) ASU – Jay Jay Wilson 18-yard pass from Manny Wilkins, Manny Wilkins two-point pass to Jay Jay Wilson (Drive: 8 plays, 65 yards, 2:55; Washington 30–11)
- (9:33) WASH – Myles Gaskin 45-yard run, Cameron Van Winkle kick (Drive: 2 plays, 48 yards, 0:53; Washington 37–11)
- (6:10) ASU – Jay Jay Wilson 9-yard pass from Manny Wilkins, Zane Gonzalez kick (Drive: 12 plays, 87 yards, 3:18; Washington 37–18)
- (6:03) WASH – Keishawn Bierria 45-yard kickoff return, Cameron Van Winkle kick (Washington 44–18)

Statistics	ASU	WASH
First downs	14	26
Total yards	245	539
Rushing yards	27–15	33–201
Passing yards	167	269
Passing: Comp–Att–Int	21–33–1	27–44–2
Time of possession	27:50	32:10

Team	Category	Player	Statistics
Arizona State	Passing	Manny Wilkins	20/32, 227 yards, 2 TD, INT
Arizona State	Rushing	Demario Richard	8 carries, 25 yards
Arizona State	Receiving	N'Keal Harry	6 receptions, 114 yards
Washington	Passing	Jake Browning	27/44, 338 yards, 2 TD, 2 INT
Washington	Rushing	Myles Gaskin	16 carries, 127 yards, TD
Washington	Receiving	Dante Pettis	7 receptions, 105 yards, TD

=== at Arizona ===
Arizona State Sun Devils (5–6) at Arizona Wildcats (2–9) – Game summary

Quarter	1	2	3	4	Total
Sun Devils	7	7	14	7	35
Wildcats	7	21	14	14	56

at Arizona Stadium • Tucson, AZ

- Date: November 25, 2016
- Game time: 7:30 p.m.
- Game weather: Clear, 65 °F (18 °C)
- Game attendance: 50,197
- Referee: Terry Leyden
- TV announcers (ESPN): Dave LaMont (play-by-play), Ray Bentley (analyst), Quint Kessenich (sideline reporter)

Game information

First quarter

- (13:48) ARIZ – Brandon Dawkins 71-yard run, Josh Pollack kick (Drive: 3 plays, 75 yards, 1:12; Arizona 7–0)
- (7:49) ASU – Koron Crump 42-yard fumble return, Zane Gonzalez kick (Tied 7–7)

Second quarter

- (14:18) ARIZ – Brandon Dawkins 10-yard run, Josh Pollack kick (Drive: 6 plays, 67 yards, 1:56; Arizona 14–7)
- (10:08) ARIZ – Nate Phillips 64-yard pass from Brandon Dawkins, Josh Pollack kick (Drive: 2 plays, 63 yards, 0:40; Arizona 21–7)
- (7:07) ARIZ – Zach Green 1-yard run, Josh Pollack kick (Drive: 5 plays, 23 yards, 1:33; Arizona 28–7)
- (0:34) ASU – Tim White 21-yard pass from Manny Wilkins, Zane Gonzalez kick (Drive: 13 plays, 94 yards, 4:20; Arizona 28–14)

Third quarter

- (11:14) ASU – Kalen Ballage 2-yard run, Zane Gonzalez kick (Drive: 9 plays, 65 yards, 3:38; Arizona 28–21)
- (9:52) ARIZ – Samajie Grant 9-yard run, Josh Pollack kick (Drive: 3 plays, 75 yards, 1:22; Arizona 35–21)
- (7:29) ASU – N'Keal Harry 16-yard pass from Manny Wilkins, Zane Gonzalez kick (Drive: 8 plays, 79 yards, 2:17; Arizona 35–28)
- (5:41) ARIZ – Zach Green 1-yard run, Josh Pollack kick (Drive: 4 plays, 83 yards, 1:34; Arizona 42–28)

Fourth quarter

- (11:45) ARIZ – Samajie Grant 2-yard run, Josh Pollack kick (Drive: 3 plays, 70 yards, 1:29; Arizona 49–28)
- (8:29) ASU – Fred Gammage 7-yard pass from Manny Wilkins, Zane Gonzalez kick (Drive: 9 plays, 76 yards, 3:09; Arizona 49–35)
- (7:45) ARIZ – Samajie Grant 63-yard run, Josh Pollack kick (Drive: 2 plays, 73 yards, 0:39; Arizona 56–35)

Statistics	ASU	ARIZ
First downs	31	19
Total yards	492	588
Rushing yards	38–120	48–511
Passing yards	372	77
Passing: Comp–Att–Int	43–60–1	3–8–0
Time of possession	35:56	24:04

Team	Category	Player	Statistics
Arizona State	Passing	Manny Wilkins	43/58, 372 yards, 3 TD, INT
Arizona State	Rushing	Manny Wilkins	23 carries, 79 yards
Arizona State	Receiving	Fred Gammage	12 receptions, 116 yards, TD
Arizona	Passing	Brandon Dawkins	3/8, 77 yards, TD
Arizona	Rushing	Brandon Dawkins	12 carries, 183 yards, 2 TD
Arizona	Receiving	Nate Phillips	2 receptions, 68 yards, TD
