= 2017 Sun Bowl =

American college football game

2017 Hyundai Sun Bowl
- 84th Sun Bowl
NC State Wolfpack	Arizona State Sun Devils
(8–4)	(7–5)
ACC	Pac-12
52	31
Head coach: Dave Doeren	Head coach: Todd Graham
CFP 24
	1	2	3	4	Total
NC State	7	21	3	21	52
Arizona State	0	10	0	21	31
- Date: December 29, 2017
- Season: 2017
- Stadium: Sun Bowl
- Location: El Paso, Texas
- MVP: Nyheim Hines (RB, NC State)
- Favorite: NC State by 5.5
- Referee: Mike Cannon (Big Ten)
- Attendance: 39,897
- Payout: US$3,447,568

United States TV coverage
- Network: CBS
- Announcers: Brad Nessler, Gary Danielson and Allie LaForce (sideline)

The 2017 Sun Bowl was a postseason college football bowl game played at Sun Bowl Stadium in El Paso, Texas, on December 29, 2017. The game was the 84th Sun Bowl and featured the NC State Wolfpack of the Atlantic Coast Conference and the Arizona State Sun Devils of the Pac-12 Conference. It was one of the 2017–18 bowl games concluding the 2017 FBS football season. Sponsored by Hyundai Motor America, the game was officially known as the Hyundai Sun Bowl.

After taking a 28–10 lead at the half, NC State defeated Arizona State by a 52–31 final score. Nyheim Hines of NC State was selected as the game MVP. His teammates Kentavius Street and Kyle Bambard were named the most valuable lineman and most valuable special teams player, respectively.

== Teams ==
=== NC State ===
The NC State Wolfpack finished the 2017 regular season with an 8–4 record under Coach Dave Doeren; the most wins Doeren has had at his tenure at NC State to date. The game was the team's first appearance in the Sun Bowl, and their second straight bowl win. Shortly after at the NFL draft, the entire NC State defensive line was selected in the first four rounds along with their running back, Nyheim Hines. Coach Doeren was offered a contract extension which locked in his role for another 6 years shortly after the game.

=== Arizona State ===
The Arizona State Sun Devils finished the 2017 regular season with a 7–5 record. The game was the team's sixth appearance in the Sun Bowl.

== Game summary ==
=== Scoring summary ===
Scoring summary

Quarter	Time	Drive			Team	Scoring information	Score	
Quarter	Time	Plays	Yards	TOP	Team	Scoring information	NCSU	ASU
1	2:40	15	87	6:46	NCSU	Nyheim Hines 5-yard touchdown run, Kyle Bambard kick good	7	0
2	14:13	6	56	1:53	NCSU	Nyheim Hines 5-yard touchdown run, Kyle Bambard kick good	14	0
2	8:06	14	62	6:07	ASU	24-yard field goal by Brandon Ruiz	14	3
2	4:42	7	75	3:24	NCSU	Nyheim Hines 5-yard touchdown run, Kyle Bambard kick good	21	3
2	2:08	7	72	2:34	ASU	N'Keal Harry 6-yard touchdown reception from Manny Wilkins, Brandon Ruiz kick good	21	10
2	1:00	5	49	1:08	NCSU	Jakobi Meyers 25-yard touchdown reception from Ryan Finley, Kyle Bambard kick good	28	10
3	8:20	4	4	1:58	NCSU	26-yard field goal by Kyle Bambard	31	10
4	14:54	12	80	7:14	NCSU	Reggie Gallaspy II 23-yard touchdown run, Kyle Bambard kick good	38	10
4	9:52	12	76	5:02	ASU	Manny Wilkins 1-yard touchdown run, Brandon Ruiz kick good	38	17
4	8:53	4	45	0:59	ASU	Kyle Williams 19-yard touchdown reception from Manny Wilkins, Brandon Ruiz kick good	38	24
4	4:06	8	38	4:47	NCSU	Jaylen Samuels 2-yard touchdown run, Kyle Bambard kick good	45	24
4	2:13	6	80	1:53	ASU	Frank Darby 20-yard touchdown reception from Manny Wilkins, Brandon Ruiz kick good	45	31
4	1:54	2	3	0:16	NCSU	Reggie Gallaspy II 2-yard touchdown run, Kyle Bambard kick good	52	31
"TOP" = time of possession. For other American football terms, see Glossary of American football.							52	31

=== Statistics ===
	1	2	3	4	Total
Wolfpack	7	21	3	21	52
Sun Devils	0	10	0	21	31

Statistics	NCSU	ASU
First downs	22	24
Plays–yards	73–491	70–469
Rushes–yards	44–173	30–117
Passing yards	318	352
Passing: Comp–Att–Int	24–29–0	25–40–3
Time of possession	34:29	25:31

Team	Category	Player	Statistics
NCSU	Passing	Finley	24–29, 318 yds, 1 TD
NCSU	Rushing	Gallaspy II	12 carries, 78 yards, 2 TD
NCSU	Receiving	Louis	3 receptions, 115 yards
ASU	Passing	Wilkins	25–40, 352 yards, 3 TD
ASU	Rushing	Richard	13 carries, 50 yards
ASU	Receiving	Harry	9 receptions, 142 yards, 1 TD
