= 2017 NC State Wolfpack football team =

American college football season

2017 NC State Wolfpack football

Sun Bowl champion

Sun Bowl, W 52–31 vs. Arizona State
- Conference: Atlantic Coast Conference
- Atlantic Division

Ranking
- Coaches: No. 23
- AP: No. 23
- Record: 9–4 (6–2 ACC)
- Head coach: Dave Doeren (5th season)
- Offensive coordinator: Eliah Drinkwitz (2nd season)
- Offensive scheme: Multiple
- Defensive coordinator: Dave Huxtable (5th season)
- Base defense: 4–3
- Home stadium: Carter–Finley Stadium

2017 Atlantic Coast Conference football standings
	Conf.			Overall
Team	W		L	W		L
Atlantic Division
No. 4 Clemson xy$^	7	–	1	12	–	2
No. 23 NC State	6	–	2	9	–	4
Wake Forest	4	–	4	8	–	5
Louisville	4	–	4	8	–	5
Boston College	4	–	4	7	–	6
Florida State	3	–	5	7	–	6
Syracuse	2	–	6	4	–	8
Coastal Division
No. 13 Miami (FL) xy	7	–	1	10	–	3
No. 24 Virginia Tech	5	–	3	9	–	4
Georgia Tech	4	–	4	5	–	6
Virginia	3	–	5	6	–	7
Pittsburgh	3	–	5	5	–	7
Duke	3	–	5	7	–	6
North Carolina	1	–	7	3	–	9
Championship: Clemson 38, Miami 3
^ – College Football Playoff participant; $ – Conference champion; x – Division champion/co-champions; y – Championship game participant; Rankings from AP Poll

The 2017 NC State Wolfpack football team represented North Carolina State University during the 2017 NCAA Division I FBS football season. The Wolfpack played their home games at Carter–Finley Stadium in Raleigh, North Carolina and competed in the Atlantic Division of the Atlantic Coast Conference. They were led by fifth-year head coach Dave Doeren. They finished the season 9–4, 6–2 in ACC play to finish in second place in the Atlantic Division. They received a bid to the Sun Bowl, where they defeated Arizona State.

On December 1, Doeren received a five-year contract extension.

== Schedule ==
NC State announced its 2017 football schedule on January 24, 2017. The 2017 schedule consisted of six home games, five away games, and one neutral site game in the regular season. The Wolfpack hosted ACC foes Clemson, Louisville, North Carolina, and Syracuse, and traveled to Boston College, Florida State, Pittsburgh, and Wake Forest.

The Wolfpack hosted two of the four non-conference opponents, Furman from the Southern Conference and Marshall from Conference USA, and traveled to Notre Dame, who competes as an independent. NC State met South Carolina from the Southeastern Conference at Bank of America Stadium in Charlotte, North Carolina.

Date	Time	Opponent	Rank	Site	TV	Result	Attendance
September 2	3:00 p.m.	vs. South Carolina*		Bank of America Stadium; Charlotte, NC (Belk Kickoff Game)	ESPN	L 28–35	50,367
September 9	6:00 p.m.	Marshall*		Carter–Finley Stadium; Raleigh, NC	ACCN Extra	W 37–20	57,430
September 16	12:20 p.m.	Furman*		Carter–Finley Stadium; Raleigh, NC	ACCN	W 49–16	56,166
September 23	12:00 p.m.	at No. 12 Florida State		Doak Campbell Stadium; Tallahassee, FL	ABC/ESPN2	W 27–21	73,541
September 30	12:20 p.m.	Syracuse		Carter–Finley Stadium; Raleigh, NC	ACCN	W 33–25	56,197
October 5	8:00 p.m.	No. 17 Louisville	No. 24	Carter–Finley Stadium; Raleigh, NC	ESPN	W 39–25	56,107
October 14	12:00 p.m.	at Pittsburgh	No. 20	Heinz Field; Pittsburgh, PA	ACCRSN	W 35–17	41,124
October 28	3:30 p.m.	at No. 9 Notre Dame*	No. 14	Notre Dame Stadium; Notre Dame, IN	NBC	L 14–35	77,622
November 4	3:30 p.m.	No. 4 Clemson^{†}	No. 20	Carter–Finley Stadium; Raleigh, NC (Textile Bowl)	ABC	L 31–38	57,600
November 11	12:00 p.m.	at Boston College	No. 23	Alumni Stadium; Chestnut Hill, MA	ABC/ESPN2	W 17–14	33,242
November 18	7:30 p.m.	at Wake Forest	No. 19	BB&T Field; Winston-Salem, NC (rivalry)	ESPNU	L 24–30	31,803
November 25	3:30 p.m.	North Carolina		Carter–Finley Stadium; Raleigh, NC (rivalry)	ESPNU	W 33–21	57,600
December 29	3:00 p.m.	vs. Arizona State*	No. 24	Sun Bowl; El Paso, TX (Sun Bowl)	CBS	W 52–31	39,897
*Non-conference game; ^{†}Homecoming; Rankings from AP Poll and CFP Rankings after October 31 released prior to game; All times are in Eastern time

== Rankings ==
Ranking movements Legend: ██ Increase in ranking ██ Decrease in ranking — = Not ranked RV = Received votes т = Tied with team above or below
	Week															
Poll	Pre	1	2	3	4	5	6	7	8	9	10	11	12	13	14	Final
AP	RV	—	—	—	RV	24	20	16–T	14	20	RV	25	RV	RV	RV	23
Coaches	RV	RV	RV	RV	RV	24	20	17	15	19	24	22	RV	RV	RV	23
CFP	Not released									20	23	19	—	24	24	Not released

== Game summaries ==
=== Vs. South Carolina ===
	1	2	3	4	Total
Gamecocks	14	7	14	0	35
Wolfpack	14	7	0	7	28

=== Marshall ===
	1	2	3	4	Total
Thundering Herd	10	10	0	0	20
Wolfpack	3	20	7	7	37

=== Furman ===
	1	2	3	4	Total
Paladins	3	10	0	3	16
Wolfpack	14	14	21	0	49

=== At Florida State ===
	1	2	3	4	Total
Wolfpack	10	7	3	7	27
No. 12 Seminoles	0	10	3	8	21

=== Syracuse ===
	1	2	3	4	Total
Orange	0	7	10	8	25
Wolfpack	13	13	0	7	33

=== Louisville ===
	1	2	3	4	Total
No. 17 Cardinals	0	10	3	12	25
No. 24 Wolfpack	0	17	7	15	39

=== At Pittsburgh ===
	1	2	3	4	Total
No. 20 Wolfpack	14	0	7	14	35
Panthers	7	7	0	3	17

=== At Notre Dame ===
	1	2	3	4	Total
No. 14 Wolfpack	7	7	0	0	14
No. 9 Fighting Irish	7	14	14	0	35

=== Clemson ===
	1	2	3	4	Total
No. 6 Tigers	7	10	14	7	38
No. 20 Wolfpack	14	7	0	10	31

=== At Boston College ===
	1	2	3	4	Total
Wolfpack	0	10	0	7	17
Eagles	0	7	7	0	14

=== At Wake Forest ===
	1	2	3	4	Total
No. 25 Wolfpack	7	7	7	3	24
Demon Deacons	14	3	7	6	30

=== North Carolina ===
	1	2	3	4	Total
Tar Heels	7	7	0	7	21
Wolfpack	6	6	7	14	33

=== Arizona State–Sun Bowl ===
	1	2	3	4	Total
Wolfpack	7	21	3	21	52
Sun Devils	0	10	0	21	31

== Personnel ==
=== Coaching staff ===
Name	Title
Dave Doeren	Head coach
Eliah Drinkwitz	Offensive coordinator/quarterbacks
Dave Huxtable	Defensive coordinator/linebackers
George Barlow	Assistant head coach/Cornerbacks
Eddie Faulkner	Special teams coordinator/tight ends/fullbacks
Aaron Henry	Safeties
Desmond Kitchings	Assistant head coach/running backs/recruiting coordinator
Dwayne Ledford	Run Game coordinator/offensive line
George McDonald	Passing Game coordinator/wide receivers
Kevin Patrick	Defensive line

=== Roster ===
2017 NC State Wolfpack football team roster
Quarterbacks: 2 Jalan McClendon – junior (6'5, 221) (redshirt); 10 Micah Leon – freshman (6'5, 205); 12 Jory Perkins – freshman (6'0, 145); 13 Matt McKay – freshman (6'3, 200); 14 Woody Cornwell – junior (6'2, 210) (redshirt); 15 Ryan Finley – junior (6'4, 210) (redshirt); Running backs: 1 Jaylen Samuels – senior (5'11, 228); 7 Nyheim Hines – junior (5'9, 197); 21 Erin Collins – freshman (6'1, 200); 24 Nakia Robinson Jr. – freshman (5'11, 193); 25 Reggie Gallaspy II – junior (5'9, 195); 27 Dakwa Nichols – graduate (5'10, 180); 28 Damontay Rhem – sophomore (5'11, 221) (redshirt); 29 Marquise Braxton – sophomore (6'1, 226) (redshirt); 33 Brady Bodine – junior (5'10, 200) (redshirt); 41 Will Eason – freshman (5'7, 173) (redshirt); 46 Logan DeBoer – freshman (6'1, 235) (redshirt); Wide receivers: 3 Kelvin Harmon – sophomore (6'2, 213); 7 Gavin Locklear – senior (5'10, 195) (redshirt); 8 Maurice Trowell – junior (5'11, 196) (redshirt); 11 Jakobi Meyers – sophomore (6'2, 203) (redshirt); 12 Stephen Louis – junior (6'2, 217) (redshirt); 19 C.J. Riley – freshman (6'4, 204) (redshirt); 31 Tyler Dabbs – freshman (5'9, 192) (redshirt); 82 Max Fisher – freshman (6'3, 205); 83 Daeshawn Stephens – freshman (6'1, 214) (redshirt); 85 JuMicheal Ramos – graduate (6'2, 200); 86 Emeka Emezie – freshman (6'3, 209); 87 Thayer Thomas – freshman (6'2, 195); Tight ends: 28 Dylan Parham – freshman (6'4, 224) (redshirt); 42 Dylan Autenrieth – freshman (6'4, 242) (redshirt); 47 Damien Darden – freshman (6'3, 250); 48 Cole Cook – graduate (6'6, 250); 88 Adam Boselli – freshman (6'5, 220); 89 Thomas Ruocchio – freshman (6'3, 245) (redshirt); Punters: 90 A. J. Cole III – junior (6'4, 230); 99 Trenton Gill – freshman (6'3, 185)	Offensive lineman: 50 Tony Adams – senior (6'2, 315); 52 Kendall Brown – freshman (6'5, 290) (redshirt); 53 Tyler Jones – junior (6'3, 300) (redshirt); 54 Will Richardson – junior (6'6, 322) (redshirt); 56 Kollin Byers – freshman (6'4, 276); 59 Liam Ryan – freshman (6'2, 300); 60 Grant Pacanovsky – freshman (6'2, 265) (redshirt); 62 Bryson Speas – freshman (6'4, 265); 64 Peter Daniel – graduate (6'6, 305); 65 Garrett Bradbury – junior (6'3, 298) (redshirt); 66 Joshua Fedd-Jackson – freshman (6'3, 336); 67 Justin Witt – freshman (6'6, 296) (redshirt); 68 Charles Fletcher – freshman (6'2, 273); 70 Terronne Prescod – junior (6'5, 331) (redshirt); 71 Joe Sculthorpe – freshman (6'3, 307) (redshirt); 72 Philip Walton Jr. – sophomore (6'7, 305) (redshirt); 73 Justin Chase – freshman (6'5, 290) (redshirt); 74 Emanuel McGirt Jr. – sophomore (6'6, 300) (redshirt); 76 Harrison Gee – freshman (6'3, 301) (redshirt); 78 Aaron Wiltz – sophomore (6'5, 307) (redshirt); 79 Ben Kaiser – senior (6'3, 292) (redshirt); Defensive lineman: 9 Bradley Chubb – senior (6'4, 275); 27 Justin Jones – senior (6'2, 312); 35 Kentavius Street – senior (6'2, 287); 39 James Smith-Williams – sophomore (6'4, 247) (redshirt); 42 Danny Blakeman – freshman (6'2, 227); 44 Bryan Smith – graduate (6'2, 259); 45 Darian Roseboro – junior (6'4, 287); 52 Ibrahim Kante – freshman (6'5, 235); 54 Davion Allred – senior (6'0, 228) (redshirt); 55 Devonte Holden – junior (6'4, 247) (redshirt); 69 Evin Bellamy – sophomore (6'2, 220) (redshirt); 73 Grant Gibson – freshman (6'1, 300); 90 Ben Frazier – freshman (6'3, 316) (redshirt); 91 Eurndraus Bryant – junior (6'1, 325); 92 Larrell Murchison – junior (6'4, 277); 95 Tyrone Riley – sophomore (6'6, 285) (redshirt); 96 Dante Johnson – freshman (6'3, 264); 97 Xavier Lyas – freshman (6'4, 215); 98 B. J. Hill – senior (6'4, 315)	Placekickers: 38 Carson Wise – graduate (5'10, 170); 92 Kyle Bambard – junior (5'8, 190); 93 Noah Giroux – freshman (6'0, 205); Linebackers: 3 Germaine Pratt – junior (6'3, 235) (redshirt); 4 Jerod Fernandez – senior (6'0, 227) (redshirt); 10 Louis Acceus – freshman (6'0, 216); 29 Raven Saunders – freshman (6'1, 220); 32 Riley Nicholson– junior (6'0, 237); 36 Brock Miller – freshman (6'3, 231) (redshirt); 41 Isaiah Moore – freshman (6'3, 224); 43 David Pierson – freshman (6'0, 232) (redshirt); 44 Fredrick Strickland – sophomore (6'2, 202) (redshirt); 49 Matt Stevens – freshman (6'0, 228) (redshirt); 58 Airius Moore – senior (6'0, 235); Defensive backs: 2 Mike Stevens – senior (5'11, 190); 5 Johnathan Alston – senior (6'0, 210) (redshirt); 10 Freddie Phillips Jr. – junior (6'1,210); 11 Stephen Griffin – junior (6'2, 205); 13 Stephen Morrison – junior (5'11, 201) (redshirt); 14 Dexter Wright – junior (6'2, 232) (redshirt); 15 Chris Ingram – freshman (6'0, 180); 19 Bryce Banks– freshman (6'2, 192) (redshirt); 21 Nick McCloud – sophomore (6'1, 189); 22 Isaiah Stallings – freshman (6'4, 220) (redshirt); 24 Shawn Boone – senior (5'10, 206); 26 Nicholas Lacy – senior (5'7, 182) (redshirt); 30 James Valdez – freshman (5'11, 193) (redshirt); 31 Jarius Morehead – sophomore (6'1, 217) (redshirt); 33 Dalton Counts – freshman (6'0, 211); 34 Tim Kid-Glass – sophomore (6'1, 202); 36 William Brown III – sophomore (5'10, 192) (redshirt); 37 Vernon Frier – sophomore (5'10, 180) (redshirt); 38 Will Dabbs – freshman (5'10,192) (redshirt); 47 Cayman Czesak – freshman (6'2, 200); Long snappers: 50 Jackson Quiggle – freshman (5'10, 205) (redshirt); 57 Tyler Griffiths – junior (6'2, 230)

== 2018 NFL draft ==
The Wolfpack had seven players selected in the 2018 NFL draft, which was a program record.

Player	Team	Round	Pick #	Position
Bradley Chubb	Denver Broncos	1st	5th	DE
B. J. Hill	New York Giants	3rd	69	DT
Justin Jones	Los Angeles Chargers	3rd	84	DT
Nyheim Hines	Indianapolis Colts	4th	104	RB
Kentavius Street	San Francisco 49ers	4th	128	DE
Will Richardson	Jacksonville Jaguars	4th	129	OT
Jaylen Samuels	Pittsburgh Steelers	5th	165	FB
