= N'Keal Harry =

Vincentian-Canadian gridiron football player (born 1997)

Profile
- Position: Wide receiver

Personal information
- Born: December 17, 1997 (age 28); Toronto, Ontario, Canada
- Listed height: 6 ft 3 in (1.91 m)
- Listed weight: 225 lb (102 kg)

Career information
- High school: Chandler (Chandler, Arizona, U.S.)
- College: Arizona State (2016–2018)
- NFL draft: 2019: 1st round, 32nd overall pick

Career history
- New England Patriots (2019–2021); Chicago Bears (2022); Minnesota Vikings (2023–2024); Seattle Seahawks (2024)*
- * Offseason or practice squad member only

Awards and highlights
- 2× First-team All-Pac-12 (2017, 2018)

Career NFL statistics
- Receptions: 64
- Receiving yards: 714
- Receiving touchdowns: 5
- Stats at Pro Football Reference

N'Keal J Harry (/nɪˈkil/, nih-KEEL; born December 17, 1997) is a Vincentian professional football wide receiver who played in the National Football League (NFL) for six seasons. He played college football for the Arizona State Sun Devils, receiving two consecutive first-team All-Pac-12 honors between 2017 and 2018. Harry was selected by the New England Patriots as the final first round pick of the 2019 NFL draft, but his tenure lasted only three seasons due to unproductive play. He later spent one season with the Chicago Bears and his final two with the Minnesota Vikings.

== Early life ==
Harry was born in Toronto, Ontario, Canada, before moving as a baby to Saint Vincent and the Grenadines. His grandmother brought him to the Phoenix metro area, with the blessing of his mother, to allow for more opportunity. Harry tried several sports as a kid; soccer, football, and basketball, among others. His grandmother had hoped he would choose a less dangerous sport, but agreed to let him play football. He starred at Chandler High School after transferring from Marcos de Niza High School in Tempe, earning five star recruiting honors from Rivals.com, and was noted by many recruiting services as one of the top wide receiver recruits in the country. In his junior season, Harry caught 13 touchdown passes on 30 catches for 657 yards.

== College career ==
Harry chose to remain home and committed to Arizona State University despite recruiting efforts by Texas A&M, Oregon, USC, among other top-tier programs. In the 2016 season-opening game against Northern Arizona University, Harry became just the ninth true freshman in school history to start a season opener. In his freshman season, Harry posted 58 catches for 659 yards and five touchdowns. Additionally, Harry ran for 69 yards and scored twice, and completed a 46-yard pass of his own. For his efforts in his rookie year, N'Keal was honored by Scout, Football Focus, and Campus Insiders as a Freshman All-American.

During his sophomore campaign, Harry had 82 catches for 1142 yards and 8 touchdowns earning him First-team All-Pac-12 Conference honors.

Harry's junior season began with media accolades, as he was selected to the 2018 Associated Press preseason All-American team. On Saturday, October 27, he made one of the greatest catches in football history according to Colin Cowherd. His acrobatic one-handed catch, along with a punt return touchdown, helped lead the Sun Devils to a win over the USC Trojans, cementing his legacy as one of the greatest receivers to don an Arizona State uniform. The following week N'Keal Harry scored three touchdowns in an upset over #15 Utah Utes. After the comeback win against the Arizona Wildcats on November 24, he announced that he would forgo his senior year and enter the 2019 NFL draft.

=== College statistics ===
Season	Team	GP	Receiving				Rushing			
Season	Team	GP	Rec	Yds	Avg	TD	Att	Yds	Avg	TD
2016	Arizona State	12	58	659	11.4	5	3	69	23.0	2
2017	Arizona State	13	82	1,142	13.9	8	13	65	5.0	0
2018	Arizona State	12	73	1,088	14.9	9	7	10	1.4	1
Career		37	213	2,889	13.6	22	23	144	6.3	3

== Professional career ==
Pre-draft measurables
Height	Weight	Arm length	Hand span	Wingspan	40-yard dash	10-yard split	20-yard split	20-yard shuttle	Three-cone drill	Vertical jump	Broad jump	Bench press	Wonderlic
6 ft 2 3/8 in (1.89 m)	228 lb (103 kg)	33 in (0.84 m)	9 1/2 in (0.24 m)	6 ft 6 1/4 in (1.99 m)	4.53 s	1.62 s	2.67 s	4.28 s	7.05 s	38.5 in (0.98 m)	10 ft 2 in (3.10 m)	27 reps	24
All values from NFL Combine/Pro Day

=== New England Patriots ===
==== 2019 season ====
Harry was selected by the New England Patriots in the first round of the 2019 NFL Draft with the 32nd overall pick. He was the second wide receiver to be selected in the first round that year, behind Marquise Brown (Baltimore Ravens, 25th overall). Harry was also the first wide receiver that Patriots head coach Bill Belichick drafted in the first round during his tenure with the Patriots and the first wide receiver the Patriots drafted in the first round since Terry Glenn in 1996. On May 14, 2019, Harry signed a 4-year deal with the Patriots worth $10.1 million featuring a $5.3 million signing bonus.

On September 2, 2019, he was placed on injured reserve as a result of the ankle injury he sustained during training camp. On November 2, 2019, Harry was activated off injured reserve. On November 24, 2019, Harry caught his first career receiving touchdown off a 10-yard pass from Tom Brady in the 13–9 win over the Dallas Cowboys. During a Week 14 matchup with the Kansas City Chiefs, Harry caught a short pass and ran into the endzone, seemingly scoring a touchdown on the play. However, Jerome Boger's referee crew ruled him out of bounds and the Patriots could not challenge the ruling. Harry left the game with a hip injury after this play. In Week 15, Harry caught two passes for 15 yards and a touchdown, and rushed two times for 22 yards in a 34–13 victory over the Cincinnati Bengals. As a rookie, he appeared in seven games in the regular season and totaled 12 receptions for 105 receiving yards and two receiving touchdowns.

==== 2020 season ====
In the season opener against the Miami Dolphins, Harry finished with 5 receptions for 39 yards in the 21–11 win. In week 2, Harry finished with a career-high 8 receptions on 12 targets for 72 receiving yards against the Seattle Seahawks. On a week 4 Monday night game against the Chiefs, Harry recorded his first touchdown of the year on a pass from Jarrett Stidham, finishing the game with 3 receptions for 21 yards and a touchdown.

==== 2021 season ====
On July 6, 2021, Harry requested to be traded from the Patriots. In a statement from his agent, Jamal Tooson, it is stated that a fresh start "before the start of training camp" would be the best for Harry. In the preseason, Harry suffered a shoulder injury and was ruled out for four weeks. He was placed on injured reserve on September 2, 2021. After the release of Cam Newton, Harry switched his jersey number from #15 to #1. He was activated on October 2. In Week 10, a game against the Cleveland Browns, Harry caught a 26-yard pass from backup quarterback Brian Hoyer. The Patriots won 45–7. In Week 17, Harry was benched and made a healthy scratch.

The Patriots declined the fifth-year option on Harry's contract on May 2, 2022, making him a free agent after the 2022 season.

=== Chicago Bears ===
On July 12, 2022, Harry was traded to the Chicago Bears for a seventh-round draft pick in the 2024 NFL draft. He was placed on injured reserve on September 1 with an ankle injury. He was activated on October 10. Harry made his season debut on October 24 against his former team, the Patriots.

=== Minnesota Vikings ===
Harry signed with the Minnesota Vikings on August 6, 2023. He was released on August 24. Harry was re-signed to the Vikings' practice squad on September 4. He was signed to the active roster on October 11. Harry was released by Minnesota on November 28. He was re-signed to the practice squad on December 4.

The Vikings signed Harry to a reserve/future contract on January 8, 2024. On June 4, Vikings head coach Kevin O'Connell announced that Harry would be transitioning from wide receiver to tight end. He was waived on August 27, and re-signed to the practice squad. He was released on October 21.

=== Seattle Seahawks ===
On November 11, 2024, the Seattle Seahawks signed Harry to their practice squad. He was released on December 3.

== NFL career statistics ==
=== Regular season ===
Year	Team	Games		Receiving					Rushing					Fumbles	
Year	Team	GP	GS	Rec	Yds	Avg	Lng	TD	Att	Yds	Avg	Lng	TD	Fum	Lost
2019	NE	7	5	12	105	8.8	18	2	5	49	9.8	18	0	0	0
2020	NE	14	9	33	309	9.3	30	2	2	0	0.0	2	0	1	1
2021	NE	12	4	12	184	15.3	43	0	0	0	0.0	0	0	1	1
2022	CHI	7	0	7	116	16.6	49	1	0	0	0.0	0	0	0	0
2023	MIN	9	0	0	0	0.0	0	0	0	0	0.0	0	0	0	0
Total		49	18	64	714	11.2	49	5	7	49	7.0	18	0	2	2

=== Postseason ===
Year	Team	Games		Receiving					Rushing					Fumbles	
Year	Team	GP	GS	Rec	Yds	Avg	Lng	TD	Att	Yds	Avg	Lng	TD	Fum	Lost
2019	NE	1	1	2	21	10.5	14	0	1	7	7.0	7	0	0	0
2021	NE	1	0	0	0	0.0	0	0	0	0	0.0	0	0	0	0
Total		2	1	2	21	10.5	14	0	1	7	7.0	7	0	0	0
