= Koron Crump =

American gridiron football player (born 1994)

Profile
- Position: Linebacker

Personal information
- Born: May 10, 1994 (age 32); St. Louis, Missouri
- Listed height: 6 ft 3 in (1.91 m)
- Listed weight: 215 lb (98 kg)

Career information
- College: Arizona State
- NFL draft: 2019: undrafted

Career history
- Hamilton Tiger-Cats (2019); Houston Roughnecks (2020)*; Hamilton Tiger-Cats (2020–2021)*
- * Offseason or practice squad member only

Awards and highlights
- Second-team All-Pac-12 (2016)
- Stats at CFL.ca

Koron Crump (born May 10, 1994) is a gridiron football linebacker who is a free agent. After playing college football for Arizona State, he was signed by the Hamilton Tiger-Cats as an undrafted free agent in 2019.

== College career ==
Crump played junior college football at Fort Scott Community College in 2014 and 2015. He combined for 100 tackles, including 21 quarterback sacks and 32 tackles-for-loss.

Crump committed to Arizona State on November 16, 2015. He chose ASU over reported offers from Minnesota, Baylor, Tennessee and others. ASU used Crump as their gunner on the punt team, a position mostly suited for smaller players, such as cornerbacks or receivers. His main position was "devil backer," which is a rush-end linebacker at ASU, and he finished his first season in Tempe with 37 tackles, in which 10.5 went for a loss, including a team-high nine quarterback sacks. Crump added an interception, three forced fumbles and three fumble recoveries to go along with his first FBS touchdown. For his efforts in his first season at ASU, Crumped was named to the second-team All-Pac-12 conference. For his senior season in 2017, Crump was named to the Lott Impact trophy preseason watch list.

== Professional career ==
=== Hamilton Tiger-Cats ===
After going undrafted in the 2019 NFL draft, Crump had a rookie minicamp tryout with the Green Bay Packers in May 2019, but was not signed to a contract. He signed with the Hamilton Tiger-Cats of the CFL for their practice roster on June 19, 2019. He was promoted to the active roster on July 31, and demoted back to the practice roster on August 9. He was released from the practice roster on November 26, 2019.

=== Houston Roughnecks ===
Crump signed with the Houston Roughnecks of the XFL on January 11, 2020. He was waived during final roster cuts on January 22, 2020.

=== Hamilton Tiger-Cats (II) ===
Crump re-signed with the Hamilton Tiger-Cats on March 4, 2020. He was released on June 28, 2021.
