= Sam Jones (American football) =

American football player (born 1996)

No. 70
- Position: Center

Personal information
- Born: February 21, 1996 (age 30); Highlands Ranch, Colorado, U.S.
- Listed height: 6 ft 5 in (1.96 m)
- Listed weight: 305 lb (138 kg)

Career information
- High school: ThunderRidge (Highlands Ranch)
- College: Arizona State
- NFL draft: 2018: 6th round, 183rd overall pick

Career history
- Denver Broncos (2018); Arizona Cardinals (2019–2020)*; Indianapolis Colts (2020–2021)*; Atlanta Falcons (2021)*; New York Giants (2021)*
- * Offseason or practice squad member only

Career NFL statistics
- Games played: 5
- Stats at Pro Football Reference

Sam Jones (born February 21, 1996) is an American former professional football player who was a center in the National Football League (NFL). He played college football for the Arizona State Sun Devils and was named a team captain as a redshirt junior.

== Professional career ==
=== Denver Broncos ===
Jones was selected by the Denver Broncos in the sixth round (183rd overall) of the 2018 NFL draft. Jones was released on August 31, 2019, as part of final roster cuts.

=== Arizona Cardinals ===
On September 2, 2019, Jones was signed to the practice squad of the Arizona Cardinals. He signed a reserve/future contract with the Cardinals on December 30, 2019.

On September 4, 2020, Jones was waived by the Cardinals.

=== Indianapolis Colts ===
On December 30, 2020, Jones was signed to the Indianapolis Colts practice squad. On January 10, 2021, Jones signed a reserve/futures contract with the Colts. On May 12, 2021, Jones was waived by the Colts.

=== Atlanta Falcons ===
Jones was claimed off waivers by the Atlanta Falcons on May 13, 2021. He was waived on August 31, 2021, and re-signed to the practice squad the next day. He was released on September 7, 2021.

=== New York Giants ===
On September 29, 2021, Jones was signed to the New York Giants practice squad. He was released on October 5.
