= Demario Richard =

American football player (born 1996)

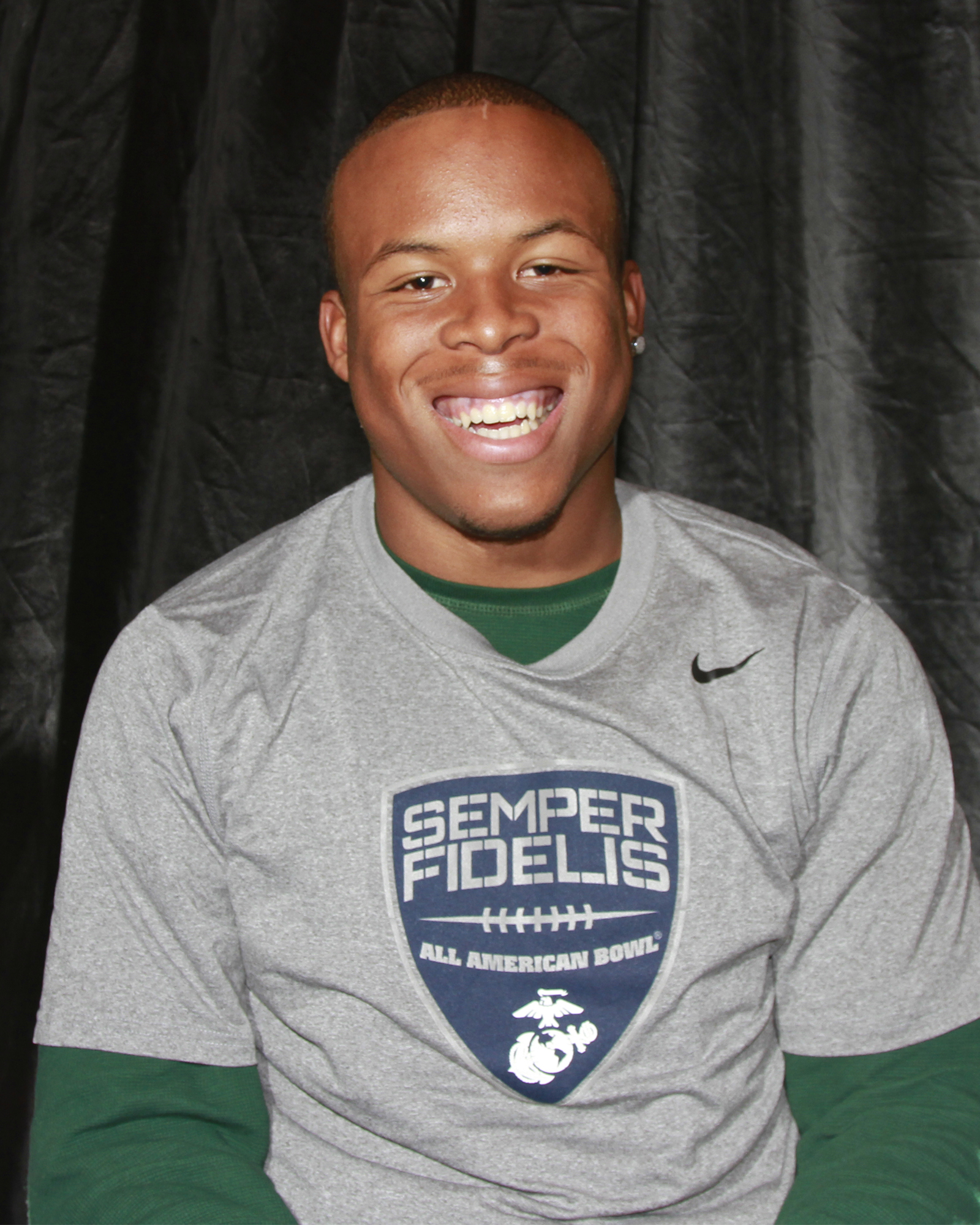
- Richard c. 2014

Profile
- Position: Running back

Personal information
- Born: December 2, 1996 (age 29); Palmdale, California, U.S.
- Listed height: 5 ft 9 in (1.75 m)
- Listed weight: 218 lb (99 kg)

Career information
- High school: Palmdale
- College: Arizona State
- NFL draft: 2018: undrafted

Career history
- Atlanta Falcons (2018)*; Arizona Hotshots (2019)*
- * Offseason or practice squad member only

Demario Richard (born December 2, 1996) is an American former football running back. He played college football at Arizona State

== Early life ==
Richard attended Palmdale High School in Palmdale, California, where he totaled 5,500 career all-purpose yards, including 4,251 rushing yards and 63 rushing touchdowns in three years. He was rated as a four-star recruit by Scout and ESPN.

== College career ==
As a freshman at Arizona State in 2014, Richard gained 478 rushing yards, scored eight touchdowns and was named the 2014 Sun Bowl's most valuable player. He is sometimes referred to by the nickname "Baby Beast Mode".

As a sophomore in 2015, Richard gained 1,104 rushing yards and 1,407 yards from scrimmage and scored 10 touchdowns. Entering his senior season, Richard's nine 100 yard rushing games ranks him ninth in school history.

== Professional career ==
Richard signed with the Atlanta Falcons as an undrafted free agent on May 1, 2018. He was waived on June 13, 2018.

Richard signed with the Arizona Hotshots of the Alliance of American Football for the 2019 season, but failed to make the final roster.
