= Brandon Ruiz =

American football player (born 1999)

Profile
- Position: Placekicker

Personal information
- Born: February 18, 1999 (age 27); Yuma, Arizona
- Listed height: 5 ft 10 in (1.78 m)
- Listed weight: 180 lb (82 kg)

Career information
- High school: Williams Field (AZ)
- College: Mississippi State
- NFL draft: 2022: undrafted

Career history
- Seattle Sea Dragons (2023)*
- * Offseason or practice squad member only

Brandon Ruiz (born February 18, 1999) is an American football placekicker. He played college football for Mississippi State and Arizona State.

== Early life ==
Ruiz attended Williams Field High School. As a senior, he made 17-of-20 field goals with a long of 58 yards and converted 66-of-67 extra points.

He was the team's kicker and punter, contributing to the school winning the 2016 5A State Championship with a 14–0 record. He set an Arizona High School record for the longest field goal (58) and tied the record for most field goals in a game (5). He also received All-region and All-state honors.

== College career ==
Ruiz accepted a football scholarship from Arizona State University. As a true freshman in 2017, he replaced the recently graduated Zane Gonzalez as the starter at kicker. He made 19-of-27 field goal attempts (long of 52 yards) and 49-of-50 extra point attempts. He had 52 touchbacks.

As a sophomore in 2018, he made 18-of-22 field goal attempts (tied 16th nationally) and 45-of-45 on extra point attempts. He had 48 touchbacks (tied 24th nationally). He received Pac-12 Special Teams Player of the Week honors, after making 3 field goals, including the game winner against No. 15 ranked Michigan State University. He had a career-long 54-yard field goal (third in school history) against San Diego State University.

As a junior in 2019, he suffered a groin injury that forced him to miss the first games of the season, while Cristian Zendejas was named the team's starter at kicker. Ruiz later announced that he planned to transfer during the summer of 2019. On December 8, 2019 he confirmed that he had chosen to transfer to Mississippi State University.

As a redshirt junior in 2020, due to the COVID-19 pandemic, Mississippi State only played 11 contests during the season. He started the first 10 games and Jace Christman the season finale. Ruiz made 10 out of 12 field goal attempts. His 14 points at Louisiana State University and against the University of Missouri tied for fourth place in school history. Ranked No. 26 in the nation and No. 7 in the SEC Conference in field goal percentage (83.3).

As a senior, he appeared in the first 2 games of the season, before being replaced with redshirt freshman Nolan Mccord in the fourth quarter of the contest against North Carolina State University, after worsening a groin injury. He returned to play in the sixth game against the University of Alabama, where he went 3 for 3 on field goals attempts. He didn't play in the last 4 games of the season because of the injury. He made 5-of-9 field goal attempts and 20-of-20 on extra point attempts.

== Professional career ==
=== Seattle Sea Dragons ===
Ruiz was selected by the XFL Seattle Sea Dragons in the Group 5 third round (24th overall) of the 2023 XFL draft.
