= Khaylan Kearse-Thomas =

American gridiron football player (born 1997)

Profile
- Position: Linebacker

Personal information
- Born: February 7, 1997 (age 29)
- Listed height: 6 ft 1 in (1.85 m)
- Listed weight: 220 lb (100 kg)

Career information
- High school: Etiwanda High School (Rancho Cucamonga, California)
- College: Arizona State University
- NFL draft: 2020: undrafted

Career history
- Tennessee Titans (2020)*; Winnipeg Blue Bombers (2021)*; Stuttgart Surge (2023)
- * Offseason or practice squad member only

Khaylan Kearse-Thomas (born February 7, 1997) is an American football linebacker. He played college football at Arizona State.

== Early life ==
Kearse-Thomas attended Etiwanda High School in Rancho Cucamonga, California. During his high school career with the Eagles he earned multiple honors. In addition to being named to All-League and All-CIF teams, he was also named to the All-State Second Team following his senior season. A four-star recruit, Kearse-Thomas committed to play college football for the Arizona State Sun Devils in 2015.

== College career ==
Kearse-Thomas played in six games as a freshman before redshirting his sophomore season. He did not miss another game in the following three years. After initially being used mainly on special teams, he also asserted himself on defense as a senior and served as the Sun Devils' starter. As a result, he recorded 66 tackles, 4.5 sacks, two interceptions and four pass break-ups in 13 games. In 2019, the Sun Devils beat the Florida State Seminoles in the 2019 Sun Bowl, marking the first time Kearse-Thomas emerged victorious after three straight bowl losses.

== Professional career ==
In late April 2020, the Tennessee Titans signed Kearse-Thomas as an undrafted free agent. He was released by the Titans in late August. On July 9, 2021, the Winnipeg Blue Bombers of the Canadian Football League (CFL) announced the signing of Kearse-Thomas. Ten days later, he was released. On January 24, 2023, he was introduced by the Stuttgart Surge of the European League of Football (ELF) for the 2023 season.

=== Professional statistics ===
Year	Team	GP	GS	Tackles						Interceptions				
Year	Team	GP	GS	Cmb	Solo	Ast	TFL	Yds	Sck	FF	PD	Int	Yds	TDs
European League of Football
2023	Stuttgart Surge	0	0	0	0	0	0	0	0	0	0	0	0	0
ELF total		0	0	0	0	0	0	0	0	0	0	0	0	0
Source: stats.europeanleague.football
