= 2017 Stanford Cardinal football team =

American college football season

2017 Stanford Cardinal football

Pac-12 North Division co-champion

Pac-12 Championship Game, L 28–31 vs. USC

Alamo Bowl, L 37–39 vs. TCU
- Conference: Pac-12 Conference
- North Division

Ranking
- Coaches: No. 19
- AP: No. 20
- Record: 9–5 (7–2 Pac-12)
- Head coach: David Shaw (7th season)
- Offensive coordinator: Mike Bloomgren (5th season)
- Offensive scheme: Multiple
- Defensive coordinator: Lance Anderson (4th season)
- Base defense: 3–4
- Home stadium: Stanford Stadium

2017 Pac-12 Conference football standings
	Conf.			Overall
Team	W		L	W		L
North Division
No. 20 Stanford xy	7	–	2	9	–	5
No. 16 Washington x	7	–	2	10	–	3
Washington State	6	–	3	9	–	4
Oregon	4	–	5	7	–	6
California	2	–	7	5	–	7
Oregon State	0	–	9	1	–	11
South Division
No. 12 USC xy$	8	–	1	11	–	3
Arizona State	6	–	3	7	–	6
Arizona	5	–	4	7	–	6
UCLA	4	–	5	6	–	7
Utah	3	–	6	7	–	6
Colorado	2	–	7	5	–	7
Championship: USC 31, Stanford 28
$ – Conference champion; x – Division champion/co-champions; y – Championship game participant; Rankings from AP Poll

The 2017 Stanford Cardinal football team represented Stanford University in the 2017 NCAA Division I FBS football season. The Cardinal were led by seventh-year head coach David Shaw. They played their home games at Stanford Stadium and were members of the North Division of the Pac-12 Conference. They finished the season 9–5, 7–2 in Pac-12 play to win a share of the North Division title with Washington. Due to their head-to-head win over Washington, they represented the North Division in the Pac-12 Championship Game where they lost to USC. They were invited to the Alamo Bowl where they lost to TCU.

== Recruiting ==
=== Position key ===
Back	B	Center	C	Cornerback	CB	Defensive back	DB
Defensive end	DE	Defensive lineman	DL	Defensive tackle	DT	End	E
Fullback	FB	Guard	G	Halfback	HB	Kicker	K
Kickoff returner	KR	Offensive tackle	OT	Offensive lineman	OL	Linebacker	LB
Long snapper	LS	Punter	P	Punt returner	PR	Quarterback	QB
Running back	RB	Safety	S	Tight end	TE	Wide receiver	WR

=== Recruits ===
Stanford signed a total of 14 recruits.

College recruiting (2017)
Name	Hometown	School	Height	Weight	Commit date
Sione Heimuli-Lund; RB	Salt Lake City, Utah	Brighton HS	6 ft 1 in (1.85 m)	237 lb (108 kg)	Nov 27, 2015
Sione Heimuli-Lund; RB	Recruit ratings: Scout: Rivals: 247Sports: ESPN:				
Colby Parkinson; TE	Westlake Village, California	Oaks Christian HS	6 ft 7 in (2.01 m)	228 lb (103 kg)	Dec 19, 2015
Colby Parkinson; TE	Recruit ratings: Scout: Rivals: 247Sports: ESPN:				
Stuart Head; S	Woodstock, Georgia	Etowah HS	6 ft 4 in (1.93 m)	190 lb (86 kg)	Dec 24, 2015
Stuart Head; S	Recruit ratings: Scout: Rivals: 247Sports: ESPN:				
Tucker Fisk; TE	Davis, California	Davis HS	6 ft 4 in (1.93 m)	225 lb (102 kg)	Mar 1, 2016
Tucker Fisk; TE	Recruit ratings: Scout: Rivals: 247Sports: ESPN:				
Davis Mills; QB	Norcross, Georgia	Greater Atlanta Christian School	6 ft 3 in (1.91 m)	192 lb (87 kg)	Mar 15, 2016
Davis Mills; QB	Recruit ratings: Scout: Rivals: 247Sports: ESPN:				
Osiris St. Brown; WR	Santa Ana, California	Mater Dei HS	6 ft 2 in (1.88 m)	181 lb (82 kg)	Aug 5, 2016
Osiris St. Brown; WR	Recruit ratings: Scout: Rivals: 247Sports: ESPN:				
Drew Dalman; C	Salinas, California	Palma School	6 ft 3 in (1.91 m)	265 lb (120 kg)	Aug 30, 2016
Drew Dalman; C	Recruit ratings: Scout: Rivals: 247Sports: ESPN:				
Walker Little; OT	Bellaire, Texas	Episcopal HS	6 ft 7 in (2.01 m)	315 lb (143 kg)	Dec 16, 2016
Walker Little; OT	Recruit ratings: Scout: Rivals: 247Sports: ESPN:				
Foster Sarell; OT	Graham, Washington	Graham-Kapowsin HS	6 ft 7 in (2.01 m)	311 lb (141 kg)	Jan 7, 2017
Foster Sarell; OT	Recruit ratings: Scout: Rivals: 247Sports: ESPN:				
Dalyn Wade-Perry; DT	Sparta, New Jersey	Pope John XXIII HS	6 ft 3 in (1.91 m)	341 lb (155 kg)	Jan 15, 2017
Dalyn Wade-Perry; DT	Recruit ratings: Scout: Rivals: 247Sports: ESPN:				
Paulson Adebo; CB	Mansfield, Texas	Mansfield HS	6 ft 2 in (1.88 m)	180 lb (82 kg)	Jan 16, 2017
Paulson Adebo; CB	Recruit ratings: Scout: Rivals: 247Sports: ESPN:				
Levani Damuni; LB	Millville, Utah	Ridgeline HS	6 ft 2 in (1.88 m)	225 lb (102 kg)	Jan 21, 2016
Levani Damuni; LB	Recruit ratings: Scout: Rivals: 247Sports: ESPN:				
Connor Wedington; RB	Sumner, Washington	Sumner HS	6 ft 0 in (1.83 m)	189 lb (86 kg)	Jan 30, 2016
Connor Wedington; RB	Recruit ratings: Scout: Rivals: 247Sports: ESPN:				
Ryan Johnson; DE	Mobile, Alabama	St. Paul's Episcopal School	6 ft 3 in (1.91 m)	253 lb (115 kg)	Jan 30, 2016
Ryan Johnson; DE	Recruit ratings: Scout: Rivals: 247Sports: ESPN:				
Overall recruit ranking:
Note: In many cases, Scout, Rivals, 247Sports, On3, and ESPN may conflict in their listings of height and weight.; In these cases, the average was taken. ESPN grades are on a 100-point scale.; Sources: "Stanford Football Commitments". Rivals.; "2017 Stanford Football Commits". Scout.; "ESPN". ESPN.; "Scout.com Team Recruiting Rankings". Scout.; "2017 Team Ranking". Rivals.com.

== Personnel ==
=== Coaching staff ===
Name	Position	Stanford years	Alma mater
David Shaw	Head coach	11th	Stanford (1994)
Lance Anderson	Defensive coordinator / outside linebackers coach	11th	Idaho State (1996)
Mike Bloomgren	Associate head coach / offensive coordinator	7th	Florida State (1999)
Pete Alamar	Special teams coordinator	4th	Cal Lutheran (1983)
Duane Akina	Defensive backs coach	4th	Washington (1979)
Peter Hansen	Inside linebackers coach	4th	Arizona (2001)
Tavita Pritchard	Quarterbacks coach	5th	Stanford (2009)
Diron Reynolds	Defensive linemen coach	1st	Wake Forest (1994)
Ron Gould	Running backs coach	1st	Oregon (1987)
Morgan Turner	Tight ends coach	5th	Illinois (2009)

=== Roster ===
2017 Stanford Cardinal football team roster
Players
Coaches
Offense

Pos.	#	Name	Class
QB	3	K.J. Costello	So
QB	10	Keller Chryst	Sr
QB	15	Davis Mills	Fr
QB	17	Ryan Burns	Sr
QB	18	Jack Richardson	So
RB	20	Bryce Love	Jr
RB	22	Cameron Scarlett	Jr
RB	23	Trevor Speights	So
RB	28	Dorian Maddox	So
FB	6	Reagan Williams	Jr
FB	24	Hannes Bohning	Fr
FB	34	Houston Heimuli	Fr
FB	35	Daniel Marx	Sr
FB	87	Ben Snyder	Jr
WR	2	Trenton Irwin	Jr
WR	4	Jay Tyler	Jr
WR	5	Connor Wedington	Fr
WR	8	Donald Stewart	So
WR	11	Harry Schwartz	So
WR	19	J. J. Arcega-Whiteside	Jr
WR	21	Isaiah Brandt-Sims	Sr
WR	46	Sidhart Krishnamurthi	Jr
WR	81	Osiris St. Brown	Fr
WR	83	Cameron Buzzell	Fr
WR	89	Ryan Atkins	Fr
TE	9	Dalton Schultz	Sr
TE	80	Scooter Harrington	So
TE	82	Kaden Smith	So
TE	84	Colby Parkinson	Fr
TE	85	Kyle McCombs	Fr
TE	88	Tucker Fisk	Fr
C	51	Drew Dalman	Fr
G	54	Nick Wilson	Jr
OG/C	55	Dylan Powell	So
G	62	Austin Maihen	Jr
G	63	Nate Herbig	So
OT/OG	64	David Bright	Sr
C	65	Brian Chaffin	Jr
G	71	Brandon Fanaika	Sr
OT	72	Walker Little	Fr
C	73	Jesse Burkett	Sr
OT	74	Devery Hamilton	So
OT	75	A.T. Hall	Sr
OT	76	Jack Dreyer	Jr
OT	77	Casey Tucker	Sr
OT	78	Henry Hattis	So
OT	79	Foster Sarell	Fr

Defense

Pos.	#	Name	Class
DE	23	Ryan Johnson	Fr
DT	50	Dalyn Wade-Perry	Fr
DE	51	Jovan Swann	So
DT	57	Michael Williams	So
DE	58	Dylan Boles	Fr
DT	66	Harrison Phillips	Sr
DE	80	Eric Cotton	Sr
DE	91	Thomas Schaffer	So
DE	97	Dylan Jackson	Jr
DT	99	Bo Peek	So
OLB	10	Jordan Fox	So
ILB	15	Jordan Perez	Sr
ILB	20	Bobby Okereke	Sr
OLB	21	Curtis Robinson	So
ILB	25	Andrew Pryts	So
ILB	27	Sean Barton	Jr
ILB	31	Mustafa Branch	Jr
ILB/OLB	32	Joey Alfieri	Sr
OLB	33	Mike Tyler	Sr
OLB	34	Peter Kalambayi	Sr
OLB	40	Anthony Trinh	So
OLB	42	Caleb Phillips	Fr
ILB	43	Ryan Beecher	Jr
ILB	44	Kevin Palma	Sr
ILB	49	Lewis Burik	Jr
OLB	52	Casey Toohill	Jr
OLB	77	Thunder Keck	Fr
OLB	86	Lane Veach	Sr
OLB	90	Gabe Reid	Fr
CB	3	Malik Antoine	So
CB	4	Alameen Murphy	Sr
CB	6	Treyjohn Butler	So
CB	11	Terrence Alexander	Sr
CB	13	Alijah Holder	Sr
CB	17	Paulson Adebo	Fr
CB	19	Noah Williams	Fr
CB	22	Obi Eboh	So
CB	24	Quenton Meeks	Jr
CB	26	J.J. Parson	So
FS	2	Brandon Simmons	Sr
FS	5	Frank Buncom	Jr
SS	8	Justin Reid	Jr
FS	9	Ben Edwards	Jr
FS	18	Stuart Head	Fr
FS	28	Denzel Franklin	Sr
SS	37	Joe McGrath	Fr

Special teams

Pos.	#	Name	Class
LS	56	Will Sweeney	Fr
LS	68	C.J. Keller	Sr
LS	69	Richard McNitzky	So
K	26	Jet Toner	So
K	37	Collin Riccitelli	So
P	14	Jake Bailey	So
P	27	Charlie Beall	Jr

Head coach

- David Shaw (Stanford)

Coordinators/assistant coaches

- Lance Anderson (Idaho State)
  Defensive coordinator/outside linebackers coach
- Mike Bloomgren (Florida State)
  Associate head coach/offensive coordinator/offensive line coach
- Pete Alamar (Cal Lutheran)
  Special teams coordinator
- Duane Akina (Washington)
  Defensive backs coach
- Peter Hansen (Arizona)
  Inside linebackers Coach
- Tavita Pritchard (Stanford)
  Quarterback/wide receivers coach
- Diron Reynolds (Wake Forest)
  Defensive line coach
- Ron Gould (Oregon)
  Running backs coach
- Morgan Turner (Illinois)
  Tight ends coach

Legend

- (C) Team captain
- (S) Suspended
- (I) Ineligible
- Injured
- Redshirt

Roster

== Schedule ==
Date	Time	Opponent	Rank	Site	TV	Result	Attendance
August 26	7:00 p.m.	vs. Rice*	No. 14	Allianz Stadium; Sydney, Australia (Sydney Cup)	ESPN	W 62–7	33,101
September 9	5:30 p.m.	at No. 6 USC	No. 14	Los Angeles Memorial Coliseum; Los Angeles, CA (rivalry)	FOX	L 24–42	77,614
September 16	7:30 p.m.	at San Diego State*	No. 19	Qualcomm Stadium; San Diego, CA	CBSSN	L 17–20	43,040
September 23	7:30 p.m.	UCLA		Stanford Stadium; Stanford, CA (rivalry)	ESPN	W 58–34	48,042
September 30	1:00 p.m.	Arizona State		Stanford Stadium; Stanford, CA	P12N	W 34–24	44,422
October 7	7:15 p.m.	at No. 20 Utah		Rice–Eccles Stadium; Salt Lake City, UT	FS1	W 23–20	45,991
October 14	8:00 p.m.	Oregon^{†}	No. 23	Stanford Stadium; Stanford, CA (rivalry)	FS1	W 49–7	48,559
October 26	6:00 p.m.	at Oregon State	No. 20	Reser Stadium; Corvallis, OR	ESPN	W 15–14	30,912
November 4	12:30 p.m.	at No. 25 Washington State	No. 21	Martin Stadium; Pullman, WA	FOX	L 21–24	32,952
November 10	7:30 p.m.	No. 9 Washington		Stanford Stadium; Stanford, CA	FS1	W 30–22	44,589
November 18	5:00 p.m.	California	No. 22	Stanford Stadium; Stanford, CA (Big Game)	FOX	W 17–14	51,424
November 25	5:00 p.m.	No. 8 Notre Dame*	No. 21	Stanford Stadium; Stanford, CA (rivalry)	ABC	W 38–20	47,352
December 1	5:00 p.m.	vs. No. 10 USC	No. 12	Levi's Stadium; Santa Clara, CA (Pac-12 Championship Game)	ESPN	L 28–31	48,031
December 28	6:00 p.m.	vs. No. 15 TCU*	No. 13	Alamodome; San Antonio, TX (Alamo Bowl)	ESPN	L 37–39	57,653
*Non-conference game; ^{†}Homecoming; Rankings from AP Poll and CFP Rankings after October 31 released prior to game; All times are in Pacific time

== Game summaries ==
=== Vs. Rice ===
Team	1	2	3	4	Total
• Cardinal	21	17	14	10	62
Owls	0	0	0	7	7

- Date: August 27
- Location: Sydney Football Stadium, Sydney, Australia
- Game start: 12:05 p.m. AEST
- Elapsed time: 3:20
- Game attendance: 33,101
- Referee: Mark Duddy
- TV announcers (ESPN): Roy Philpott, Tom Ramsey and Quint Kessenich

Scoring summary
1st	14:08	STAN	Parkinson 13-yard pass from Chryst (Toner kick)	STAN 7–0
1st	8:13	STAN	Scarlett 2-yard run (Toner kick)	STAN 14–0
1st	2:29	STAN	Love 10-yard run (Toner kick)	STAN 21–0
2nd	13:48	STAN	Scarlett 29-yard run (Toner kick)	STAN 28–0
2nd	3:40	STAN	Scarlett 1-yard run (Toner kick)	STAN 35–0
2nd	0:00	STAN	Toner 40-yard field goal	STAN 38–0
3rd	10:00	STAN	Parkinson 3-yard pass from Chryst (Toner kick)	STAN 45–0
3rd	3:24	STAN	Smith 3-yard pass from Burns (Toner kick)	STAN 52–0
4th	11:41	STAN	Toner 34-yard field goal	STAN 55–0
4th	6:19	RICE	Walter 23-yard run (Fox kick)	STAN 55–7
4th	1:52	STAN	Costello 25-yard run (Toner kick)	STAN 62–7

Statistics	Stanford	Rice
First downs	27	14
Plays–yards	73–656	62–241
Rushes–yards	36–287	38–146
Passing yards	369	95
Passing: comp–att–int	21–37–0	10–24–1
Turnovers		
Time of possession	33:38	26:22

Team	Category	Player	Statistics
Stanford	Passing	Keller Chryst	14/24, 253 yards, 2 TD
Stanford	Rushing	Bryce Love	13 carries, 180 yards, TD
Stanford	Receiving	Connor Wedington	6 receptions, 82 yards
Rice	Passing	Sam Glaesmann	7/18, 69 yards, int
Rice	Rushing	Samuel Stewart	15 carries, 71 yards
Rice	Receiving	Robby Wells III	4 receptions, 19 yards

=== At No. 6 USC ===
Team	1	2	3	4	Total
Cardinal	7	10	0	7	24
• Trojans	14	14	0	14	42

- Date: September 9
- Location: Los Angeles Memorial Coliseum, Los Angeles, California
- Game start: 5:40 p.m. PDT
- Elapsed time: 3:11
- Game attendance: 77,614
- Game weather: Scattered Clouds; 78°F; wind 6 mph W
- Referee: Chris Coyte
- TV announcers (Fox): Gus Johnson, Joel Klatt and Jenny Taft

Scoring summary
Q1	5:01	USC	Mitchell 4-yard pass from Darnold (McGrath kick)	USC 7–0
Q1	4:49	STAN	Love 75-yard run (Toner kick)	Tie 7–7
Q1	0:31	USC	Jones 1-yard run (McGrath kick)	USC 14–7
Q2	13:02	STAN	Schultz 1-yard pass from Chryst (Toner kick)	Tie 14–14
Q2	11:42	USC	Burnett 22-yard pass from Darnold (McGrath kick)	USC 21–14
Q2	2:43	STAN	Toner 36-yard field goal	USC 21–17
Q2	0:48	USC	Burnett 25-yard pass from Darnold (McGrath kick)	USC 28–17
Q4	9:42	USC	Mitchell 11-yard pass from Darnold (McGrath kick)	USC 35–17
Q4	6:41	STAN	Arcega–Whiteside 3-yard pass from Chryst (Toner kick)	USC 35–24
Q4	4:15	USC	Jones 23-yard run (McGrath kick)	USC 42–24

Statistics	Stanford	USC
First downs	16	28
Plays–yards	54–342	74–623
Rushes–yards	26–170	48–307
Passing yards	172	316
Passing: comp–att–int	15–28–0	21–26–2
Turnovers		
Time of possession	25:25	34:35

Team	Category	Player	Statistics
Stanford	Passing	Keller Chryst	15/28, 172 yards, 2 TD
Stanford	Rushing	Bryce Love	17 carries, 160 yards, TD
Stanford	Receiving	J. J. Arcega-Whiteside	4 receptions, 67 yards, TD
USC	Passing	Sam Darnold	21/26, 316 yards, 4 TD, 2 int
USC	Rushing	Ronald Jones II	23 carries, 116 yards, 2 TD
USC	Receiving	Deontay Burnett	9 receptions, 121 yards, 2 TD

=== At San Diego State ===
Team	1	2	3	4	Total
Cardinal	0	7	3	7	17
• Aztecs	0	10	3	7	20

- Date: September 16
- Location: San Diego Stadium, San Diego, California
- Game start: 7:39 p.m. PDT
- Elapsed time: 3:35
- Game attendance: 43,040
- Game weather: Partly Cloudy; 68°F; wind Calm
- Referee: Terry Layden
- TV announcers (CBSSN): Ben Holden, Jay Feely and John Schriffen

Scoring summary
2nd	14:05	SDSU	Baron 43-yard field goal	SDSU 3–0
2nd	12:38	STAN	Love 51-yard run (Toner kick)	STAN 7–3
2nd	0:43	SDSU	Penny 4-yard run (Baron kick)	SDSU 10–7
3rd	8:33	SDSU	Baron 36-yard field goal	SDSU 13–7
3rd	4:51	STAN	Toner 20-yard field goal	SDSU 13–10
4th	14:51	STAN	Love 53-yard run (Toner kick)	STAN 17–13
4th	0:54	SDSU	Wells 8-yard pass from Chapman (Baron kick)	SDSU 20–17

Statistics	Stanford	San Diego State
First downs	10	21
Plays–yards	43–254	78–353
Rushes–yards	22–174	49–166
Passing yards	80	187
Passing: comp–att–int	10–21–2	21–29–0
Turnovers		
Time of possession	18:46	41:14

Team	Category	Player	Statistics
Stanford	Passing	Keller Chryst	9/20, 72 yards, 2 int
Stanford	Rushing	Bryce Love	13 carries, 184 yards, 2 TD
Stanford	Receiving	Trenton Irwin	6 receptions, 49 yards
San Diego State	Passing	Christian Chapman	21/29, 187 yards, TD
San Diego State	Rushing	Rashaad Penny	32 carries, 184 yards, TD
San Diego State	Receiving	Mikah Holder	7 receptions, 85 yards

=== UCLA ===
Team	1	2	3	4	Total
Bruins	3	10	14	7	34
• Cardinal	6	17	14	21	58

- Date: September 23
- Location: Stanford Stadium, Stanford, California
- Game start: 7:36 p.m. PDT
- Elapsed time: 3:49
- Game attendance: 48,042
- Game weather: Perfect; 68°F; wind 8 mph WNW
- Referee: Mike Mothershed
- TV announcers (ESPN): Mark Jones, Rod Gilmore and Quint Kessenich

Scoring summary
1st	12:17	STAN	Toner 34-yard field goal	STAN 3–0
1st	8:15	UCLA	Molson 27-yard field goal	Tied 3–3
1st	0:53	STAN	Toner 32-yard field goal	STAN 6–3
2nd	14:12	UCLA	Molson 45-yard field goal	Tied 6–6
2nd	11:23	UCLA	Andrews 12-yard pass from Rosen (Molson kick)	UCLA 13–6
2nd	3:35	STAN	Scarlett 2-yard run (Toner kick)	Tied 13–13
2nd	0:55	STAN	Costello 9-yard run (Toner kick)	STAN 20–13
2nd	0:00	STAN	Toner 39-yard field goal	STAN 23–13
3rd	11:51	UCLA	Jamabo 3-yard run (Molson kick)	STAN 23–20
3rd	8:26	STAN	Irwin 15-yard pass from Costello (Toner kick)	STAN 30–20
3rd	1:59	STAN	Scarlett 1-yard run (Toner kick)	STAN 37–20
3rd	0:19	UCLA	Lasley 39-yard pass from Rosen	STAN 37–27
4th	8:52	STAN	Schultz 3-yard pass from Costello (Toner kick)	STAN 44–27
4th	6:59	UCLA	Massington 15-yard pass from Rosen (Molson kick)	STAN 44–34
4th	5:58	STAN	Love 69-yard run (Toner kick)	STAN 51–34
4th	2:25	STAN	Scarlett 4-yard run (Toner kick)	STAN 58–34

Statistics	UCLA	Stanford
First downs	27	23
Plays–yards	75–595	69–553
Rushes–yards	15–115	45–405
Passing yards	480	148
Passing: comp–att–int	40–60–2	16–24–0
Turnovers		
Time of possession	23:20	36:40

Team	Category	Player	Statistics
UCLA	Passing	Josh Rosen	40/60, 480 yards, 3 TD, 2 int
UCLA	Rushing	Soso Jamabo	12 carries, 100 yards, TD
UCLA	Receiving	Jordan Lasley	11 receptions, 158 yards, TD
Stanford	Passing	K. J. Costello	13/19, 123 yards, 2 TD
Stanford	Rushing	Bryce Love	30 carries, 263 yards, TD
Stanford	Receiving	J. J. Arcega-Whiteside	5 receptions, 62 yards

=== Arizona State ===
Team	1	2	3	4	Total
Sun Devils	3	14	0	7	24
• Cardinal	7	17	7	3	34

- Date: September 30
- Location: Stanford Stadium, Stanford, California
- Game start: 1:07 p.m. PDT
- Elapsed time: 3:09
- Game attendance: 44,422
- Game weather: Sunny; 73°F; wind 5 mph N
- Referee: Kevin Mar
- TV announcers (P12N): Ted Robinson, Yogi Roth and Jill Savage

Scoring summary
1st	13:27	STAN	Love 61-yard run (Toner kick)	STAN 7–0
1st	0:45	ASU	Ruiz 32-yard field goal	STAN 7–3
2nd	13:22	STAN	Love 43-yard run (Toner kick)	STAN 14–3
2nd	7:25	ASU	Richard 3-yard run (Ruiz kick)	STAN 14–10
2nd	4:11	STAN	Arcega-Whiteside 12-yard pass from Costello (Toner kick)	STAN 21–10
2nd	1:33	ASU	French-Love 14-yard pass from Harry (Ruiz kick)	STAN 21–17
2nd	0:00	STAN	Toner 21-yard field goal	STAN 24–17
3rd	6:46	STAN	Love 59-yard run (Toner kick)	STAN 31–17
4th	8:02	ASU	Richard 2-yard run (Ruiz kick)	STAN 31–24
4th	2:26	STAN	Toner 22-yard field goal	STAN 34–24

Statistics	Arizona State	Stanford
First downs	22	17
Plays–yards	71–409	57–504
Rushes–yards	46–214	33–331
Passing yards	195	173
Passing: comp–att–int	16–25–2	15–24–0
Turnovers		
Time of possession	32:15	27:45

Team	Category	Player	Statistics
Arizona State	Passing	Manny Wilkins	15/24, 181 yards, 2 int
Arizona State	Rushing	Demario Richard	22 carries, 80 yards, 2 TD
Arizona State	Receiving	Demario Richard	3 receptions, 57 yards
Stanford	Passing	K. J. Costello	15/24, 173 yards, TD
Stanford	Rushing	Bryce Love	25 carries, 301 yards, 3 TD
Stanford	Receiving	J. J. Arcega-Whiteside	4 receptions, 63 yards, TD

=== At No. 20 Utah ===
Team	1	2	3	4	Total
• Cardinal	3	10	3	7	23
Utes	7	3	3	7	20

- Date: October 7
- Location: Rice–Eccles Stadium, Salt Lake City, Utah
- Game start: 8:15 p.m. MDT
- Elapsed time: 3:25
- Game attendance: 45,991
- Game weather: Clear; 67°F; wind 1 mph WSW
- Referee: Land Clark
- TV announcers (FS1): Eric Collins, Danny Kanell and A. J. Hawk

Scoring summary
1st	11:19	STAN	Toner 21-yard field goal	STAN 3–0
1st	6:00	UTAH	Moss 2-yard run (Gay kick)	UTAH 7–3
2nd	9:35	STAN	Chryst 7-yard run (Toner kick)	STAN 10–7
2nd	3:00	UTAH	Gay 30-yard field goal	Tied 10–10
2nd	0:06	STAN	Toner 46-yard field goal	STAN 13–10
3rd	11:26	STAN	Toner 29-yard field goal	STAN 16–10
3rd	3:35	UTAH	Gay 30-yard field goal	STAN 16–13
4th	12:02	STAN	Love 68-yard run (Toner kick)	STAN 23–13
4th	0:44	UTAH	Carrington 18-yard pass from Williams (Gay kick)	STAN 23–20

Statistics	Stanford	Utah
First downs	14	25
Plays–yards	55–384	73–382
Rushes–yards	31–196	33–144
Passing yards	188	238
Passing: comp–att–int	13–24–0	20–40–2
Turnovers		
Time of possession	27:23	32:37

Team	Category	Player	Statistics
Stanford	Passing	Keller Chryst	8/15, 131 yards
Stanford	Rushing	Bryce Love	20 carries, 152 yards, TD
Stanford	Receiving	Kaden Smith	2 receptions, 57 yards
Utah	Passing	Troy Williams	20/39, 238 yards, TD, 2 int
Utah	Rushing	Zack Moss	15 carries, 79 yards, TD
Utah	Receiving	Darren Carrington	7 receptions, 99 yards, TD

=== Oregon ===
Team	1	2	3	4	Total
Ducks	7	0	0	0	7
• Cardinal	21	7	7	14	49

- Date: October 14
- Location: Stanford Stadium, Stanford, California
- Game start: 8:09 p.m. PDT
- Elapsed time: 3:08
- Game attendance: 48,859
- Game weather: Mild; 68°F; wind 3 mph SSW
- Referee: Chris Coyte
- TV announcers (FS1): Tim Brando, Spencer Tillman and Holly Sonders

Scoring summary
1st	12:34	STAN	Love 5-yard run (Toner kick)	STAN 7–0
1st	10:37	STAN	Love 67-yard run (Toner kick)	STAN 14–0
1st	8:48	ORE	Burmeister 1-yard run (Schneider kick)	STAN 14–7
1st	3:26	STAN	Arcega-Whiteside 3-yard pass from Chryst (Toner kick)	STAN 21–7
2nd	8:05	STAN	Simmons 2-yard punt return (Toner kick)	STAN 28–7
3rd	6:53	STAN	Arcega-Whiteside 12-yard pass from Chryst (Toner kick)	STAN 35–7
4th	11:09	STAN	Parkinson 3-yard pass from Chryst (Toner kick)	STAN 42–7
4th	3:03	STAN	Parkinson 2-yard pass from Costello (Toner kick)	STAN 49–7

Statistics	Oregon	Stanford
First downs	12	25
Plays–yards	56–309	69–504
Rushes–yards	43–276	41–248
Passing yards	33	256
Passing: comp–att–int	5–13–2	21–28–1
Turnovers		
Time of possession	22:43	37:17

Team	Category	Player	Statistics
Oregon	Passing	Braxton Burmeister	3/8, 23 yards, 2 int
Oregon	Rushing	Royce Freeman	18 carries, 143 yards
Oregon	Receiving	Brenden Schooler	2 receptions, 15 yards
Stanford	Passing	Keller Chryst	15/21, 183 yards, 3 TD, int
Stanford	Rushing	Bryce Love	17 carries, 147 yards, 2 TD
Stanford	Receiving	J. J. Arcega-Whiteside	6 receptions, 112 yards, 2 TD

=== At Oregon State ===
Team	1	2	3	4	Total
• Cardinal	0	6	3	6	15
Beavers	0	7	7	0	14

- Date: October 26
- Location: Reser Stadium, Corvallis, Oregon
- Game start: 6:01 p.m. PDT
- Elapsed time: 3:18
- Game attendance: 30,912
- Game weather: Clear; 64°F; wind 5-10 mph
- Referee: Mark Duddy
- TV announcers (ESPN): Dave Flemming, Brock Huard and Laura Rutledge

Scoring summary
2nd	12:57	STAN	Toner 40-yard field goal	STAN 3–0
2nd	5:52	OSU	Garretson 3-yard run (Choukair kick)	OSU 7–3
2nd	0:27	STAN	Toner 33-yard field goal	OSU 7–6
3rd	11:55	OSU	Tyner 18-yard run (Choukair kick)	OSU 14–6
3rd	0:24	STAN	Toner 40-yard field goal	OSU 14–9
4th	0:20	STAN	Arcega-Whiteside 3-yard pass from Chryst (pass failed)	STAN 15–14

Statistics	Stanford	Oregon State
First downs	12	20
Plays–yards	60–222	63–264
Rushes–yards	27–81	41–138
Passing yards	141	126
Passing: comp–att–int	16–33–1	13–22–1
Turnovers		
Time of possession	27:14	32:46

Team	Category	Player	Statistics
Stanford	Passing	Keller Chryst	16/33, 141 yards, TD, int
Stanford	Rushing	Cameron Scarlett	17 carries, 72 yards
Stanford	Receiving	Kaden Smith	2 receptions, 37 yards
Oregon State	Passing	Darell Garretson	13/21, 126 yards, int
Oregon State	Rushing	Ryan Nall	19 carries, 84 yards
Oregon State	Receiving	Noah Togiai	2 receptions, 38 yards

=== At No. 25 Washington State ===
Team	1	2	3	4	Total
Cardinal	0	7	14	0	21
• Cougars	0	14	3	7	24

- Date: November 4
- Location: Martin Stadium, Pullman, Washington
- Game start: 12:35 p.m. PDT
- Elapsed time: 3:20
- Game attendance: 32,952
- Game weather: Overcast; 35°F; wind 7 mph SSW
- Referee: Steve Strimling
- TV announcers (Fox): Justin Kutcher, Mark Helfrich and Petros Papadakis

Scoring summary
2nd	14:06	STAN	Love 52-yard run (Toner kick)	STAN 7–0
2nd	10:49	WSU	Martin 12-yard pass from Falk (Powell kick)	Tied 7–7
2nd	5:29	WSU	Bell 27-yard pass from Falk (Powell kick)	WSU 14–7
3rd	10:51	WSU	Powell 41-yard field goal	WSU 17–7
3rd	6:30	STAN	Costello 14-yard run (Toner kick)	WSU 17–14
3rd	2:37	STAN	Okereke 52-yard interception return (Toner kick)	STAN 21–17
4th	6:56	WSU	Calvin 11-yard pass from Falk (Powell kick)	WSU 24–21

Statistics	Stanford	Washington State
First downs	9	25
Plays–yards	47–198	77–430
Rushes–yards	27–93	29–93
Passing yards	105	337
Passing: comp–att–int	9–20–1	34–48–1
Turnovers		
Time of possession	26:50	33:10

Team	Category	Player	Statistics
Stanford	Passing	K. J. Costello	9/20, 105 yards, int
Stanford	Rushing	Bryce Love	16 carries, 69 yards, TD
Stanford	Receiving	J. J. Arcega-Whiteside	3 receptions, 52 yards
Washington State	Passing	Luke Falk	34/48, 337 yards, 3 TD, int
Washington State	Rushing	Jamal Morrow	16 carries, 66 yards
Washington State	Receiving	Tavares Martin	7 receptions, 67 yards, TD

=== No. 9 Washington ===
Team	1	2	3	4	Total
Huskies	7	7	0	8	22
• Cardinal	0	10	10	10	30

- Date: November 10
- Location: Stanford Stadium, Stanford, California
- Game start: 7:45 p.m. PST
- Elapsed time: 3:20
- Game attendance: 44,589
- Game weather: Partly Cloudy; 56°F; wind 3 mph NW
- Referee: Land Clark
- TV announcers (FS1): Justin Kutcher, Mark Helfrich and Petros Papadakis

Scoring summary
1st	6:16	WASH	Gaskin 2-yard run (Vizcaino kick)	WASH 7–0
2nd	14:55	STAN	Love 1-yard run (Toner kick)	Tied 7–7
2nd	11:37	WASH	Gaskin 15-yard run (Vizcaino kick)	WASH 14–7
2nd	1:32	STAN	Toner 38-yard field goal	WASH 14–10
3rd	9:15	STAN	Love 13-yard run (Toner kick)	STAN 17–14
3rd	0:01	STAN	Toner 32-yard field goal	STAN 20–14
4th	11:45	STAN	Toner 31-yard field goal	STAN 23–14
4th	8:48	STAN	Love 9-yard run (Toner kick)	STAN 30–14
4th	4:22	WASH	Gaskin 1-yard run (Pettis pass from Browning)	STAN 30–22

Statistics	Washington	Stanford
First downs	20	21
Plays–yards	56–325	71–406
Rushes–yards	33–135	44–195
Passing yards	190	211
Passing: comp–att–int	17–23–0	16–27–0
Turnovers		
Time of possession	23:55	36:05

Team	Category	Player	Statistics
Washington	Passing	Jake Browning	17/23, 190 yards
Washington	Rushing	Myles Gaskin	18 carries, 120 yards, 3 TD
Washington	Receiving	Aaron Fuller	4 receptions, 53 yards
Stanford	Passing	K. J. Costello	16/27, 211 yards
Stanford	Rushing	Bryce Love	30 carries, 166 yards, 3 TD
Stanford	Receiving	J. J. Arcega-Whiteside	5 receptions, 130 yards

=== California ===
Big Game

Team	1	2	3	4	Total
Golden Bears	3	3	8	0	14
• Cardinal	3	7	7	0	17

- Date: November 18
- Location: Stanford Stadium, Stanford, California
- Game start: 5:15 p.m. PST
- Elapsed time: 3:01
- Game attendance: 51,424
- Game weather: Partly Cloudy; 57°F; wind 2 mph ENE
- Referee: Terry Leyden
- TV announcers (Fox): Joe Davis, Brady Quinn and Jen Hale

Scoring summary
1st	11:20	STAN	Toner 42-yard field goal	STAN 3–0
1st	6:16	CAL	Anderson 44-yard field goal	Tied 3–3
2nd	8:17	STAN	Smith 17-yard pass from Costello (Toner kick)	STAN 10–3
2nd	2:43	CAL	Anderson 26-yard field goal	STAN 10–6
3rd	8:57	STAN	Love 57-yard run (Toner kick)	STAN 17–6
3rd	4:02	CAL	Laird 1-yard run (Bowers run)	STAN 17–14

Statistics	California	Stanford
First downs	19	21
Plays–yards	57–337	64–378
Rushes–yards	28–155	38–193
Passing yards	182	185
Passing: comp–att–int	20–29–1	17–26–1
Turnovers		
Time of possession	26:31	33:29

Team	Category	Player	Statistics
California	Passing	Ross Bowers	20/29, 182 yards, int
California	Rushing	Patrick Laird	20 carries, 153 yards, TD
California	Receiving	Jordan Veasy	5 receptions, 68 yards
Stanford	Passing	K. J. Costello	17/26, 185 yards, TD, int
Stanford	Rushing	Bryce Love	14 carries, 101 yards, TD
Stanford	Receiving	J. J. Arcega-Whiteside	7 receptions, 79 yards

=== Notre Dame ===
	1	2	3	4	Total
No. 9 Fighting Irish	7	3	10	0	20
No. 20 Cardinal	7	7	3	21	38

=== Vs. USC (Pac-12 Championship game) ===
	1	2	3	4	Total
No. 14 Cardinal	0	14	7	7	28
No. 11 Trojans	7	10	7	7	31

=== Vs. TCU (Alamo Bowl) ===
	1	2	3	4	Total
No. 15 Cardinal	14	7	10	6	37
No. 13 Horned Frogs	3	7	13	16	39

== Rankings ==
Ranking movements Legend: ██ Increase in ranking ██ Decrease in ranking — = Not ranked RV = Received votes
	Week															
Poll	Pre	1	2	3	4	5	6	7	8	9	10	11	12	13	14	Final
AP	14	14	19	RV	RV	RV	23	22	20	18	RV	20	20	14	15	20
Coaches	14	14	19	RV	RV	RV	25	22	20	18	RV	23	20	15	16	19
CFP	Not released									21	—	22	21	12	13	Not released

== Players drafted into the NFL ==
Round	Pick	Player	Position	NFL club
3	68	Justin Reid	S	Houston Texans
3	96	Harrison Phillips	DT	Buffalo Bills
4	137	Dalton Schultz	TE	Dallas Cowboys
6	214	Peter Kalambayi	OLB	Houston Texans
