= 2017 Pac-12 Football Championship Game =

- Conference Championship
Stanford Cardinal	USC Trojans
(9–3)	(10–2)
28	31
Head coach: David Shaw	Head coach: Clay Helton
AP / Coaches / CFP; 14 / 15 / 12	AP / Coaches / CFP; 11 / 9 / 10
	1	2	3	4	Total
Stanford	0	14	7	7	28
USC	7	10	7	7	31
- Date: December 1, 2017
- Season: 2017
- Stadium: Levi's Stadium
- Location: Santa Clara, CA
- MVP: Sam Darnold, USC
- Favorite: USC by 3.5
- National anthem: Jordan Fisher
- Referee: Mike Mothershed
- Attendance: 48,031

United States TV coverage
- Network: ESPN, ESPN Radio, ESPN Deportes
- Announcers: Joe Tessitore, Todd Blackledge and Holly Rowe (ESPN); Bill Rosinski, David Norrie, and Ian Fitzsimmons (ESPN Radio)

2017 Pac-12 Conference football standings
	Conf.			Overall
Team	W		L	W		L
North Division
No. 20 Stanford xy	7	–	2	9	–	5
No. 16 Washington x	7	–	2	10	–	3
Washington State	6	–	3	9	–	4
Oregon	4	–	5	7	–	6
California	2	–	7	5	–	7
Oregon State	0	–	9	1	–	11
South Division
No. 12 USC xy$	8	–	1	11	–	3
Arizona State	6	–	3	7	–	6
Arizona	5	–	4	7	–	6
UCLA	4	–	5	6	–	7
Utah	3	–	6	7	–	6
Colorado	2	–	7	5	–	7
Championship: USC 31, Stanford 28
$ – Conference champion; x – Division champion/co-champions; y – Championship game participant; Rankings from AP Poll

The 2017 Pac-12 Football Championship Game was played on December 1, 2017, at Levi's Stadium in Santa Clara, California to determine the champion of the Pac-12 Conference in football for the 2017 season. It was the seventh football championship game in Pac-12 Conference history. The game featured the South Division champion USC Trojans against the North Division co-champion Stanford Cardinal, a rematch of the 2015 championship and the first rematch in the game's history. USC defeated Stanford by a score of 31–28, becoming the first South Division member to win the Pac-12 Championship Game.

The game was televised nationally by ESPN.

== History ==
This was the seventh playing of the Pac-12 Football Championship Game. Stanford, making its fourth appearance, won the 2012, 2013 and 2015 Pac-12 titles.

== Teams ==
=== Stanford (North) ===
Stanford went into the game having won 7 of their last 10 meetings with USC.

=== USC (South) ===
USC clinched their second Pac-12 Championship game berth in three years after beating Colorado 38–24.

== Game summary ==
=== Scoring Summary ===
Scoring summary

Quarter	Time	Drive			Team	Scoring information	Score	
Quarter	Time	Plays	Yards	TOP	Team	Scoring information	STAN	USC
1	4:38	9	70	4:04	USC	Michael Pittman Jr. 7-yard touchdown reception from Sam Darnold, Chase McGrath kick good	0	7
2	14:55	10	68	4:43	STAN	Bryce Love 9-yard touchdown run, Jet Toner kick good	7	7
2	9:46	11	69	5:09	USC	24-yard field goal by Chase McGrath	7	10
2	3:02	7	97	2:44	USC	Tyler Vaughns 19-yard touchdown reception from Sam Darnold, Chase McGrath kick good	7	17
2	0:34	9	75	2:28	STAN	Cameron Scarlett 1-yard touchdown run, Jet Toner kick good	14	17
3	4:49	6	61	2:18	USC	Ronald Jones II 1-yard touchdown run, Chase McGrath kick good	14	24
3	2:31	5	67	2:18	STAN	Kaden Smith 11-yard touchdown reception from K. J. Costello, Jet Toner kick good	21	24
4	4:22	8	99	3:38	USC	Ronald Jones II 8-yard touchdown run, Chase McGrath kick good	21	31
4	2:09	8	90	2:13	STAN	Kaden Smith 11-yard touchdown reception from K.J. Costello, Jet Toner kick good	28	31
"TOP" = time of possession. For other American football terms, see Glossary of American football.							28	31

== See also ==
- List of Pac-12 Conference football champions
- Stanford–USC football rivalry

== Notes ==
USC had the better conference record and was therefore designated as the home team. The officials for the game were: Michael Mothershed, Referee; Roscoe Meisenheimer, Umpire; Cravonne Barrett, Head Linesman; Dale Keller, Line Judge; Clay Reynard, Side Judge; Steve Currie, Field Judge; Joe Johnston, Back Judge; Randy Campbell, Center Judge; Chuck McFerrin, Instant Replay Official; Jack Wood, Instant Replay Communicator.
