= 2017 Colorado Buffaloes football team =

American college football season

2017 Colorado Buffaloes football
- Conference: Pac-12 Conference
- South Division
- Record: 5–7 (2–7 Pac-12)
- Head coach: Mike MacIntyre (5th season)
- Co-offensive coordinators: Brian Lindgren (5th season); Darrin Chiaverini (2nd season)
- Offensive scheme: Pro-style
- Defensive coordinator: D. J. Eliot (1st season)
- Base defense: 3–4
- Home stadium: Folsom Field

Uniform
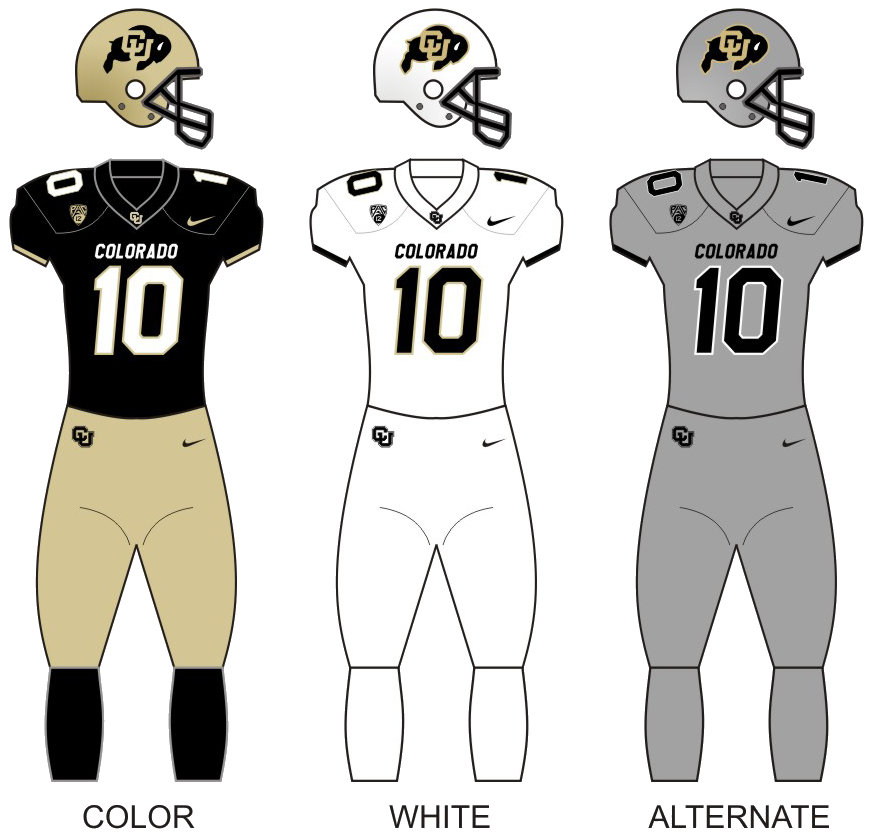

2017 Pac-12 Conference football standings
	Conf.			Overall
Team	W		L	W		L
North Division
No. 20 Stanford xy	7	–	2	9	–	5
No. 16 Washington x	7	–	2	10	–	3
Washington State	6	–	3	9	–	4
Oregon	4	–	5	7	–	6
California	2	–	7	5	–	7
Oregon State	0	–	9	1	–	11
South Division
No. 12 USC xy$	8	–	1	11	–	3
Arizona State	6	–	3	7	–	6
Arizona	5	–	4	7	–	6
UCLA	4	–	5	6	–	7
Utah	3	–	6	7	–	6
Colorado	2	–	7	5	–	7
Championship: USC 31, Stanford 28
$ – Conference champion; x – Division champion/co-champions; y – Championship game participant; Rankings from AP Poll

The 2017 Colorado Buffaloes football team represented the University of Colorado Boulder during the 2017 NCAA Division I FBS football season. The Buffaloes were led by fifth-year head coach Mike MacIntyre, and played their home games at Folsom Field in Boulder. They competed as members of the South Division of the Pac-12 Conference. They finished the season 5–7, 2–7 in Pac-12 play to finish in last place in the South Division.

== Schedule ==
Colorado announced their 2017 football schedule on January 18, 2017.

Date	Time	Opponent	Site	TV	Result	Attendance
September 1	6:00 p.m.	vs. Colorado State*	Sports Authority Field; Denver, CO (Rocky Mountain Showdown)	P12N	W 17–3	73,932
September 9	12:00 p.m.	Texas State*	Folsom Field; Boulder, CO	P12N	W 37–3	43,822
September 16	12:00 p.m.	Northern Colorado*	Folsom Field; Boulder, CO	P12N	W 41–21	44,318
September 23	8:00 p.m.	No. 7 Washington	Folsom Field; Boulder, CO	FS1	L 10–37	47,666
September 30	8:30 p.m.	at UCLA	Rose Bowl; Pasadena, CA	ESPN2	L 23–27	61,338
October 7	6:00 p.m.	Arizona	Folsom Field; Boulder, CO	P12N	L 42–45	49,976
October 14	2:00 p.m.	at Oregon State	Reser Stadium; Corvallis, OR	P12N	W 36–33	33,785
October 21	8:45 p.m.	at No. 15 Washington State	Martin Stadium; Pullman, WA	ESPN	L 0–28	31,461
October 28	12:00 p.m.	California^{†}	Folsom Field; Boulder, CO	P12N	W 44–28	47,216
November 4	7:00 p.m.	at Arizona State	Sun Devil Stadium; Tempe, AZ	P12N	L 30–41	44,553
November 11	2:00 p.m.	No. 12 USC	Folsom Field; Boulder, CO	FOX	L 24–38	49,337
November 25	8:00 p.m.	at Utah	Rice–Eccles Stadium; Salt Lake City, UT (Rumble in the Rockies)	FS1	L 13–34	46,022
*Non-conference game; ^{†}Homecoming; Rankings from AP Poll released prior to the game; All times are in Mountain time

== Coaching staff ==
Name	Title
Mike MacIntyre	Head coach
Darrin Chiaverini	Co-offensive coordinator/wide receivers coach/recruiting coordinator
D. J. Eliot	Defensive coordinator/linebackers coach
Brian Lindgren	Co-offensive coordinator/quarterbacks coach
Klayton Adams	Offensive line coach
Gary Bernardi	Tight ends & h-backs coach
Shadon Brown	Secondary coach
Ross Els	Inside linebackers coach
Darian Hagan	Running backs coach
Jim Jeffcoat	Defensive line coach

== Game summaries ==
=== Vs. Colorado State ===
Colorado State vs. Colorado
(Rocky Mountain Showdown)

Team	1	2	3	4	Total
Rams	0	3	0	0	3
• Buffaloes	10	7	0	0	17

- Date: September 1
- Location: Sports Authority Field
  Denver, CO
- Game start: 6:07 p.m. MDT
- Elapsed time: 3:11
- Game attendance: 73,932
- Game weather: Mostly Sunny
- Referee: Chris Coyte
- Television network: P12N

Overall record	Previous meeting	Previous winner
64–22–2	September 2, 2016	Colorado, 44–7

=== Vs. Texas State ===
Texas State at Colorado

Team	1	2	3	4	Total
Bobcats	0	0	3	0	3
• Buffaloes	7	7	17	6	37

- Date: September 9
- Location: Folsom Field
  Boulder, CO
- Game start: 12:02 p.m. MDT
- Elapsed time: 3:01
- Game attendance: 43,822
- Game weather: Sunny
- Referee: Steve Strimling
- Television network: P12N

Overall record	Previous meeting	Previous winner
First meeting	—	—

=== Vs. Northern Colorado ===
Northern Colorado at Colorado

Team	1	2	3	4	Total
Bears	7	7	7	0	21
• Buffaloes	14	14	3	10	41

- Date: September 16
- Location: Folsom Field
  Boulder, CO
- Game start: 12:01 p.m. MDT
- Elapsed time: 3:22
- Game attendance: 44,318
- Game weather: Cloudy
- Referee: Steve Strimling
- Television network: P12N

Overall record	Previous meeting	Previous winner
9–2	October 12, 1934	Northern Colorado, 13–7

=== Vs. Washington ===
Washington at Colorado

Team	1	2	3	4	Total
• No. 7 Huskies	0	10	14	13	37
Buffaloes	7	0	3	0	10

- Date: September 23
- Location: Folsom Field
  Boulder, CO
- Game start: 8:12 p.m. MDT
- Game attendance: 47,666
- Game weather: 45° • Rainy • Wind NE @ 8 mph
- Referee: Land Clark
- TV announcers (Fox Sports 1): Tim Brando, Spencer Tillman, and Holly Sonders

Overall record	Previous meeting	Previous winner
5–10–1	December 2, 2016	Washington, 41–10

=== At UCLA ===
Colorado at UCLA

Team	1	2	3	4	Total
Buffaloes	7	3	10	3	23
• Bruins	7	7	7	6	27

- Date: September 30
- Location: Rose Bowl
  Pasadena, CA

Overall record	Previous meeting	Previous winner
3–9	November 3, 2016	Colorado, 20–10

=== Vs. Arizona ===
Arizona at Colorado

Team	1	2	3	4	Total
• Wildcats	14	7	14	10	45
Buffaloes	7	7	7	21	42

- Date: October 7
- Location: Folsom Field
  Boulder, CO

Overall record	Previous meeting	Previous winner
14–5	November 12, 2016	Colorado, 49–24

=== At Oregon State ===
Colorado at Oregon State

Team	1	2	3	4	Total
• Buffaloes	7	7	7	15	36
Beavers	10	9	7	7	33

- Date: October 14
- Location: Reser Stadium
  Corvallis, OR

Overall record	Previous meeting	Previous winner
4–5	October 1, 2016	Colorado, 47–6

=== At Washington State ===
Colorado at Washington State

Team	1	2	3	4	Total
Buffaloes	0	0	0	0	0
• No. 15 Cougars	0	14	7	7	28

- Date: October 21
- Location: Martin Stadium
  Pullman, WA

Overall record	Previous meeting	Previous winner
6–4	November 19, 2016	Colorado, 38–24

=== Vs. California ===
California at Colorado
(homecoming Game)

Team	1	2	3	4	Total
Golden Bears	7	7	0	14	28
• Buffaloes	14	13	0	17	44

- Date: October 28
- Location: Folsom Field
  Boulder, CO

Overall record	Previous meeting	Previous winner
3–5	September 27, 2014	California, 59–56^{2OT}

=== At Arizona State ===
Colorado at Arizona State

Team	1	2	3	4	Total
Buffaloes	3	14	10	3	30
• Sun Devils	0	14	3	24	41

- Date: November 4
- Location: Sun Devil Stadium
  Tempe, AZ

Overall record	Previous meeting	Previous winner
1–7	October 15, 2016	Colorado, 40–16

=== Vs. USC ===
USC at Colorado

Team	1	2	3	4	Total
• Trojans	0	20	10	8	38
Buffaloes	0	0	14	10	24

- Date: November 11
- Location: Folsom Field
  Boulder, CO
- Game start: 2:05 p.m. MDT
- Elapsed time: 3:35
- Game attendance: 49,337
- Game weather: Mostly Sunny; 59°F; wind 3 mph NE
- Referee: Terry Leyden
- TV announcers (Fox): Tim Brando, Spencer Tillman and Holly Sonders

Scoring summary
Q2	11:59	USC	Pittman Jr. 10-yard pass from Darnold (McGrath kick)	USC 7–0
Q2	7:51	USC	Burnett 18-yard pass from Darnold (McGrath kick)	USC 14–0
Q2	0:19	USC	Harris 34-yard interception return (kick failed)	USC 20–0
Q3	9:14	USC	Darnold 24-yard run (McGrath kick)	USC 27–0
Q3	8:34	COLO	Winfree 79-yard pass from Montez (Stefanou kick)	USC 27–7
Q3	5:30	COLO	Lindsay 1-yard run (Stefanou kick)	USC 27–14
Q3	2:13	USC	McGrath 26-yard field goal	USC 30–14
Q4	12:42	COLO	Stefanou 39-yard field goal	USC 30–17
Q4	8:56	USC	Jones 22-yard run (Krommenhoek pass from Darnold)	USC 38–17
Q4	7:35	COLO	Winfree 57-yard pass from Montez (Stefanou kick)	USC 38–24

Overall record	Previous meeting	Previous winner
0–11	October 8, 2016	USC, 21–17

=== At Utah ===
Colorado at Utah
(Rumble in the Rockies)

Team	1	2	3	4	Total
Buffaloes	0	0	7	6	13
• Utes	14	14	3	3	34

- Date: November 25
- Location: Rice-Eccles Stadium
  Salt Lake City, UT

Overall record	Previous meeting	Previous winner
32–28–3	November 26, 2016	Colorado, 27–22

== Roster ==
2017 Colorado Buffaloes football team roster
Players
Coaches
Offense

Pos.	#	Name	Class
WR	1	Shay Fields	Sr
WR	2	Devin Ross	Sr
WR	3	Laviska Shenault	Fr
WR	4	Bryce Bobo	Sr
TE	5	George Frazier	Sr
WR	6	Johnny Huntley III	So
QB	7	Tyler Lytle	Fr
TB	8	Alex Fontenot	Fr
QB	9	T.J. Patterson	Sr
WR	9	Juwann Winfree	Jr
WR	10	Jaylon Jackson	Fr
QB	12	Steven Montez	So
WR	13	K.D. Nixon	Fr
WR	14	Jay MacIntyre	Jr
QB	15	Sam Noyer	Fr
QB	16	Tyler McGarry	Fr
WR	17	Kabion Ento	Sr
QB	17	Casey Marksberry	Fr
WR	18	Lee Walker	Jr
TB	19	Michael Adkins II	Sr
TB	21	Kyle Evans	Jr
WR	22	Maurice Bell	Fr
TB	23	Phillip Lindsay (C)	Sr
TB	29	Donovan Lee	Sr
TB	30	Riley Hillis	So
TB	35	Beau Bisharat	So
TE	43	Chris Bounds	So
TB	45	Tanner Grzesiek	Sr
OL	53	Heston Paige	Fr
OL	55	Brett Tonz	So
OL	56	Tim Lynott	So
OL	60	Dillon Middlemiss	So
OL	61	Kolter Smith	Fr
OL	62	Justin Eggers	So
OL	64	Aaron Haigler	So
OL	65	Colby Pursell	Fr
OL	66	Grant Polley	Fr
OL	68	Gerrad Kough	Sr
OL	70	Jacob Moretti	Fr
OL	71	Jack Shutack	So
OL	73	Isaac Miller	So
OL	74	Chance Lytle	Fr
OL	75	Josh Kaiser	Jr
OL	76	Jeromy Irwin (C)	Sr
OL	77	Hunter Vaughn	Fr
OL	78	Will Sherman	Fr
OL	79	Jonathan Huckins	Sr
TE	80	Derek Coleman	Fr
TE	81	Eric Klemmer	Fr
WR	82	Tony Brown	Jr
WR	83	Erik Lawson	So
WR	84	Cameron Frazier	Jr
TE	85	Jared Poplawski	Fr
TE	86	Dylan Keeney	Jr
WR	87	Xavier Cochrane	Jr
WR	88	Curtis Chiaverini	Fr
WR	89	Kevin Dement	Sr
TE	91	Eddy Lopez	Jr
OL		Casey Roddick	Fr

Defense

Pos.	#	Name	Class
DB	1	Afolabi Laguda (C)	Sr
DB	2	Ronnie Blackmon	Fr
DB	3	Derrion Rakestraw	Fr
DB	4	Dante Wigley	So
DE	5	George Frazier	Sr
DB	5	Trey Udoffia	Fr
DB	6	Evan Worthington	Jr
DB	7	Nick Fisher	Jr
DB	8	Anthony Julmisse	So
NT	9	Javier Edwards	Jr
LB	10	Dante Sparaco	Fr
OLB	13	Shamar Hamilton	Jr
CB	14	Chris Miller	Fr
ILB	20	Drew Lewis	Jr
DB	21	Darrell Hubbard	Jr
DB	22	Kyle Trego	Jr
DB	23	Isaiah Lewis	Fr
DB	25	Ryan Moeller	Sr
DB	26	Isaiah Oliver	Jr
CB	27	Kevin George	So
DB	28	Daniel Talley	Jr
DB	29	Uryan Hudson	Fr
ILB	31	Jonathan Van Diest	Fr
ILB	32	Rick Gamboa (C)	Jr
S	33	Chase Sanders	Fr
LB	34	Chase Newman	Fr
ILB	36	Akil Jones	Fr
DB	37	Lucas Cooper	So
LB	38	Brady Russell	Fr
DB	39	Jaisen Sanchez	Jr
OLB	40	Carson Wells	Fr
DB	41	Andrew Bergner	Sr
OLB	42	N.J. Falo	Jr
OLB	44	Jacob Callier	Fr
LB	45	Jacob Stoltenberg	Fr
ILB	46	Trent Headley	Sr
OLB	47	Nick Edridge	Fr
DE	50	Frank Umu	So
LB	51	Bryan Meek	Sr
DE	52	Leo Jackson III	Sr
ILB	53	Nate Landman	Fr
DE	54	Terrance Lang	Fr
DT	56	Jase Franke	Jr
OLB	57	Sam Bennion	Fr
DE	59	Timothy Coleman	Sr
DT	72	Lyle Tuiloma	So
DE	90	Terriek Roberts	Fr
OLB	93	Michael Mathewes	Jr
OLB	95	Derek McCartney (C)	Sr
OLB	96	Terran Hasselbach	Jr
DL	97	Mo Bandi	So
DL	98	Nico Magri	Fr
DT		Jalen Sami	Fr

Special teams

Pos.	#	Name	Class
K	15	Chris Graham	Sr
K	48	James Stefanou	Fr
K	49	Davis Price	So
LS	63	J.T. Bale	So
LS	69	Devin Noth	Fr
P	89	Alex Kinney	Jr
P	92	Bailey Landwehr	Jr
K	95	Nick Porter	So

Head coach

- Mike MacIntyre

Coordinators/assistant coaches

- Darrin Chiaverini (co-offensive coordinator / wide receivers / recruiting coordinator)
- D. J. Eliot (defensive coordinator / linebackers)
- Brian Lindgren (co-offensive coordinator / quarterbacks)
- Klayton Adams (offensive line)
- Gary Bernardi (tight ends / halfbacks)
- Shadon Brown (secondary)
- Ross Els (inside linebackers)
- Darian Hagan (running backs)
- Jim Jeffcoat (defensive line)
- Chidera Uzo-Diribe (graduate assistant)

Legend

- (C) Team captain
- (S) Suspended
- (I) Ineligible
- Injured
- Redshirt

Roster
Last update: July 19, 2017
