= 2017 Washington State Cougars football team =

American college football season

2017 Washington State Cougars football

Holiday Bowl, L 17–42 vs. Michigan State
- Conference: Pac-12 Conference
- North Division
- Record: 9–4 (6–3 Pac-12)
- Head coach: Mike Leach (6th season)
- Offensive scheme: Air raid
- Defensive coordinator: Alex Grinch (3rd season)
- Base defense: Multiple 3–4
- Home stadium: Martin Stadium

2017 Pac-12 Conference football standings
	Conf.			Overall
Team	W		L	W		L
North Division
No. 20 Stanford xy	7	–	2	9	–	5
No. 16 Washington x	7	–	2	10	–	3
Washington State	6	–	3	9	–	4
Oregon	4	–	5	7	–	6
California	2	–	7	5	–	7
Oregon State	0	–	9	1	–	11
South Division
No. 12 USC xy$	8	–	1	11	–	3
Arizona State	6	–	3	7	–	6
Arizona	5	–	4	7	–	6
UCLA	4	–	5	6	–	7
Utah	3	–	6	7	–	6
Colorado	2	–	7	5	–	7
Championship: USC 31, Stanford 28
$ – Conference champion; x – Division champion/co-champions; y – Championship game participant; Rankings from AP Poll

The 2017 Washington State Cougars football team represented Washington State University during the 2017 NCAA Division I FBS football season. The team was coached by sixth-year head coach Mike Leach and played their home games at Martin Stadium in Pullman, Washington. They competed as members of the North Division of the Pac-12 Conference. They finished the season 9–4, 6–3 in Pac-12 play to finish in third place in the North Division. They were invited to the Holiday Bowl where they lost to Michigan State.

== Rankings ==
Ranking movements Legend: ██ Increase in ranking ██ Decrease in ranking RV = Received votes
	Week															
Poll	Pre	1	2	3	4	5	6	7	8	9	10	11	12	13	14	Final
AP	24	20	21	18	16	11	8	15	15	25	19	15	14	21	21	RV
Coaches	RV	22	22	18	16	11	9	18	16	RV	20	16	15	22	21	RV
CFP	Not released									25	19	14	13	18	18	Not released

== Schedule ==
Washington State announced their 2017 football schedule on January 18;

Date	Time	Opponent	Rank	Site	TV	Result	Attendance
September 2	7:30 p.m.	Montana State*	No. 24	Martin Stadium; Pullman, WA	FS1	W 31–0	30,254
September 9	7:30 p.m.	Boise State*	No. 20	Martin Stadium; Pullman, WA	ESPN	W 47–44 ^{3OT}	32,631
September 16	2:30 p.m.	Oregon State	No. 21	Martin Stadium; Pullman, WA	P12N	W 52–23	32,487
September 23	3:00 p.m.	Nevada*	No. 18	Martin Stadium; Pullman, WA	P12N	W 45–7	30,317
September 29	7:30 p.m.	No. 5 USC	No. 16	Martin Stadium; Pullman, WA	ESPN	W 30–27	33,773
October 7	5:00 p.m.	at Oregon	No. 11	Autzen Stadium; Eugene, OR	FOX	W 33–10	56,653
October 13	7:30 p.m.	at California	No. 8	California Memorial Stadium; Berkeley, CA	ESPN	L 3–37	26,244
October 21	7:45 p.m.	Colorado^{†}	No. 15	Martin Stadium; Pullman, WA	ESPN	W 28–0	31,461
October 28	6:30 p.m.	at Arizona	No. 15	Arizona Stadium; Tucson, AZ	P12N	L 37–58	42,822
November 4	12:30 p.m.	No. 21 Stanford	No. 25	Martin Stadium; Pullman, WA	FOX	W 24–21	32,952
November 11	2:30 p.m.	at Utah	No. 19	Rice–Eccles Stadium; Salt Lake City, UT	P12N	W 33–25	45,826
November 25	5:00 p.m.	at No. 17 Washington	No. 13	Husky Stadium; Seattle, WA (Apple Cup)	FOX	L 14–41	71,265
December 28	6:00 p.m.	vs. No. 16 Michigan State*	No. 18	SDCCU Stadium; San Diego, CA (Holiday Bowl)	FS1	L 17–42	47,092
*Non-conference game; ^{†}Homecoming; Rankings from AP Poll and CFP Rankings after October 31 released prior to game; All times are in Pacific time

== Coaching staff ==
Name	Title	Years at WSU	Alma mater
Mike Leach	Head coach	6	BYU, 1983
Alex Grinch	Defensive coordinator/secondary coach	3	Mount Union, 2002
Jason Loscalzo	Strength and conditioning coach	6	Humboldt State, 1999
Roy Manning	Outside linebackers coach	3	Michigan, 2004
Jim Mastro	Running backs coach	6	Cal Poly, 1994
Clay McGuire	Offensive line coach	6	Texas Tech, 2004
Eric Mele	Special teams coach	3	William Paterson, 2002
Dave Nichol	Outside receivers coach	2	Texas Tech, 1999
Jeff Phelps	Defensive line coach	1	Ball State, 1998
Derek Sage	Inside receivers coach	1	Cal State Northridge, 2002
Ken Wilson	Linebackers coach	5	North Central College, 1996

== Game summaries ==
=== Vs. Montana State ===
Montana State at Washington State

Team	1	2	3	4	Total
Bobcats	0	0	0	0	0
• No. 24 Cougars	7	7	7	10	31

- Date: September 2
- Location: Martin Stadium
  Pullman, WA
- Game start: 7:35 pm PST
- Elapsed time: 3:00
- Game attendance: 30,254
- Game weather: 87 °F (31 °C), Clear, Wind S 5 mph
- Referee: Kevin Mar
- TV announcers (FS1): Brian Custer (play by play) and Ben Leber (color commentator)

Overall record	Previous meeting	Previous winner
9–0	September 11, 2010	Washington State, 23–22

=== Vs. Boise State ===
Boise State at Washington State

Team	1	2	3	4	OT	2OT	3OT	Total
Broncos	7	3	7	14	3	7	3	44
• No. 20 Cougars	7	3	0	21	3	7	6	47

- Date: September 9
- Location: Martin Stadium
  Pullman, WA
- Game start: 7:35 p.m. PST
- Elapsed time: 4:00
- Game attendance: 32,631
- Television network: ESPN

Scoring summary
1	12:07	BSU	A. Mattison 4-yard rush (H. Hoggarth PAT).	BSU 7–0
1	4:47	WSU	R. Taylor 7-yard fumble return (E. Powell PAT).	TIED 7–7
2	9:14	BSU	H. Hoggarth 34-yard field goal.	BSU 10–7
2	0:41	WSU	E. Powell 20-yard field goal.	TIED 10–10
3	4:10	BSU	M. Cozart 14-yard rush (H. Hoggarth PAT).	BSU 17–10
4	14:53	BSU	C. Wilson 47-yard pass from M. Cozart (H. Hoggarth PAT).	BSU 24–10
4	10:53	BSU	C. Weaver 55-yard fumble return (H. Hoggarth PAT).	BSU 31–10
4	8:00	WSU	J. Calvin 17-yard pass from T. Hilinski (E. Powell PAT).	BSU 31–17
4	5:51	WSU	P. Pelluer 36-yard interception return (E. Powell PAT).	BSU 31–24
4	1:44	WSU	J. Morrow 6-yard pass from T. Hilinski (E. Powell PAT).	TIED 31–31
OT		BSU	H. Hoggarth 29-yard field goal.	BSU 34–31
OT		WSU	E. Powell 22-yard field goal.	TIED 34–34
2OT		WSU	G. Wicks 1-yard rush (E. Powell PAT).	WSU 34–41
2OT		BSU	C. Wilson 15-yard pass from M. Cozart (H. Hoggarth PAT).	TIED 41–41
3OT		BSU	H. Hoggarth 37-yard field goal.	BSU 44–41
3OT		WSU	J. Morrow 22-yard pass from T. Hilinski.	WSU 44–47

- Sources: ESPN

Overall record	Previous meeting	Previous winner
5–1	September 10, 2016	Boise State, 31–28

=== Vs. Oregon State ===
Oregon State at Washington State

Team	1	2	3	4	Total
Beavers	2	7	7	7	23
• No. 21 Cougars	7	21	14	10	52

- Date: September 16
- Location: Martin Stadium
  Pullman, WA
- Game start: 2:30 p.m. PST
- Game attendance: 32,487
- Television network: PAC-12

Overall record	Previous meeting	Previous winner
52–47–3	October 29, 2016	Washington State, 35–31

=== Vs. Nevada ===
Nevada at Washington State

Team	1	2	3	4	Total
Wolf Pack	0	0	0	7	7
• No. 18 Cougars	14	21	3	7	45

- Date: September 23
- Location: Martin Stadium
  Pullman, WA

Overall record	Previous meeting	Previous winner
3–1	September 5, 2014	Nevada, 24–13

=== Vs. USC ===
USC at Washington State

Team	1	2	3	4	Total
No. 5 Trojans	7	10	3	7	27
• No. 16 Cougars	3	14	3	10	30

- Date: September 29
- Location: Martin Stadium
  Pullman, WA
- Game attendance: 33,773
- Referee: Steve Strimling

Scoring summary
1	11:41	WSU	E. Powell 44-yard field goal.	WSU 0–3
1	7:46	USC	S. Darnold 4-yard rush (C. McGrath PAT).	USC 7–3
2	14:48	WSU	T. Martin Jr. 28-yard pass from L. Falk (E. Powell PAT).	WSU 7–10
2	11:25	USC	R. Jones 86-yard rush (C. McGrath PAT).	USC 14–10
2	9:47	USC	C. McGrath 20-yard field goal.	USC 17–10
2	0:13	WSU	J. Morrow 1-yard rush (E. Powell PAT).	TIED 17–17
3	8:20	WSU	E. Powell 33-yard field goal.	WSU 17–20
3	0:16	USC	C. McGrath 29-yard field goal.	TIED 20–20
4	10:14	WSU	J. Morrow 23-yard pass from L. Falk (E. Powell PAT).	WSU 20–27
4	5:01	USC	S. Darnold 2-yard rush (C. McGrath PAT).	TIED 27–27
4	1:40	WSU	E. Powell 32-yard field goal.	WSU 27–30

- Sources: ESPN CBS

Overall record	Previous meeting	Previous winner
10–59–4	November 1, 2014	USC, 44–17

=== At Oregon ===
Washington State at Oregon

Team	1	2	3	4	Total
• No. 11 Cougars	7	6	10	10	33
Ducks	10	0	0	0	10

- Date: October 7
- Location: Autzen Stadium
  Eugene, OR

Overall record	Previous meeting	Previous winner
41–47–7	October 1, 2016	Washington State, 51–33

=== At California ===
Washington State at California

Team	1	2	3	4	Total
No. 8 Cougars	0	3	0	0	3
• Golden Bears	10	7	3	17	37

- Date: October 13
- Location: California Memorial Stadium
  Berkeley, CA
- Game start: 7:41 PST
- Elapsed time: 3:26
- Game attendance: 26,244
- Referee: Kevin Mar
- TV announcers (ESPN): Adam Amin, Dusty Dvoracek, Molly McGrath

Overall record	Previous meeting	Previous winner
27–46–5	November 12, 2016	Washington State, 56–21

=== Vs. Colorado ===
Colorado at Washington State

Team	1	2	3	4	Total
Buffaloes	0	0	0	0	0
• No. 15 Cougars	0	14	7	7	28

- Date: October 21
- Location: Martin Stadium
  Pullman, WA
- Game start: 7:45 p.m. PST
- Game attendance: 31,461
- Game weather: Rain
- Television network: ESPN

Overall record	Previous meeting	Previous winner
4–6	November 19, 2016	Colorado, 38–24

=== At Arizona ===
Washington State at Arizona

Team	1	2	3	4	Total
No. 15 Cougars	7	7	13	10	37
• Wildcats	10	13	14	21	58

- Date: October 28
- Location: Arizona Stadium
  Tucson, AZ

Overall record	Previous meeting	Previous winner
16–26	November 5, 2016	Washington State, 69–7

=== Vs. Stanford ===
Stanford at Washington State

Team	1	2	3	4	Total
No. 18 Cardinal	0	7	14	0	21
• No. 25 Cougars	0	14	3	7	24

- Date: November 4
- Location: Martin Stadium
  Pullman, WA
- Game attendance: 32,952

Overall record	Previous meeting	Previous winner
26–40–1	October 8, 2016	Washington State, 42–16

=== At Utah ===
Washington State at Utah

Team	1	2	3	4	Total
• No. 19 Cougars	13	7	6	7	33
Utes	0	10	0	15	25

- Date: November 11
- Location: Rice-Eccles Stadium Stadium
  Salt Lake City, UT

Overall record	Previous meeting	Previous winner
7–7	September 27, 2014	Washington State, 28–27

=== At Washington ===
Washington State at Washington

Team	1	2	3	4	Total
No. 14 Cougars	0	0	0	14	14
• No. 15 Huskies	7	17	10	7	41

- Date: November 25
- Location: Husky Stadium
  Seattle, WA

Overall record	Previous meeting	Previous winner
32–71–6	November 25, 2016	Washington, 45–17

=== vs Michigan State ===
Washington State vs Michigan State

Team	1	2	3	4	Total
• No. 18 Spartans	0	21	14	7	42
No. 21 Cougars	3	0	7	7	17

- Date: November 25
- Location: SDCCU Stadium
  San Diego, CA

Overall record	Previous meeting	Previous winner
2–5	September 17, 1977	Washington State, 23–21

== Awards ==
Player	Award	Date
Peyton Pelluer	Pac-12 Defensive Player of the Week	September 11, 2017
Luke Falk	Pac-12 Offensive Player of the Week	September 18, 2017
Jahad Woods	Pac-12 Defensive Player of the Week	October 2, 2017
Erik Powell	Pac-12 Special Teams Player of the Week	October 2, 2017
Luke Falk	Davey O'Brien QB of the Week	October 3, 2017
Erik Powell	Pac-12 Special Teams Player of the Week	October 9, 2017
Luke Falk	Pac-12 Offensive Player of the Week	November 6, 2017
Hercules Mata'afa	Pac-12 Defensive Player of the Week	November 13, 2017
Erik Powell	Pac-12 Special Teams Player of the Week	November 13, 2017
Luke Falk	2017 Burlsworth Trophy Winner	December 4, 2017
Cody O'Connell	2017 All-Pac-12 Conference First Team Offense	December 5, 2017
Hercules Mata’afa	2017 All-Pac-12 Conference First Team Defense	December 5, 2017
Cole Madison	2017 All-Pac-12 Conference Second Team Offense	December 5, 2017
Jalen Thompson	2017 All-Pac-12 Conference Second Team Defense	December 5, 2017
Erik Powell	2017 All-Pac-12 Conference Second Team Specialists	December 5, 2017
Andre Dillard	2017 All-Pac-12 Conference Honorable Mention	December 5, 2017
Luke Falk	2017 All-Pac-12 Conference Honorable Mention	December 5, 2017
Frankie Luvu	2017 All-Pac-12 Conference Honorable Mention	December 5, 2017
Jamal Morrow	2017 All-Pac-12 Conference Honorable Mention	December 5, 2017

== 2017 Football Roster ==
Name	Height	Weight
DAVONTAVEAN MARTIN	6'3"	182LBS
JOSH TALBOTT	5'10"	179LBS
ROBERT TAYLOR	5'10"	186LBS
Tyler Hilinski	6'3"	213LBS
DARRIEN MOLTON	5'10"	185LBS
Luke Falk	6'4"	223LBS
MARCUS STRONG	5'9"	177LBS
TRAVELL HARRIS	5'9"	177LBS
JAMIRE CALVIN	5'10"	152LBS
KIRKLAND PARKER	6'1"	190LBS
TREY TINSLEY	6'3"	211LBS
Tavares Martin	6'1	183LBS
