= 2017 California Golden Bears football team =

American college football season

2017 California Golden Bears football
- Conference: Pac-12 Conference
- North Division
- Record: 5–7 (2–7 Pac-12)
- Head coach: Justin Wilcox (1st season)
- Offensive coordinator: Beau Baldwin (1st season)
- Offensive scheme: Multiple
- Defensive coordinator: Tim DeRuyter (1st season)
- Base defense: 3–4
- Captain: (14): *Devante Downs (9); *James Looney (8); *Kanawai Noa (7); *Patrick Laird (7); *Matt Anderson (1); *Ross Bowers (1); *Ashtyn Davis (1); *Jordan Veasy (1); *Raymond Davison (1); *Jaylinn Hawkins (1); *Patrick Mekari (1); *Tony Mekari (1); *Vic Wharton III (1); *Addison Ooms (1)
- Home stadium: California Memorial Stadium

2017 Pac-12 Conference football standings
	Conf.			Overall
Team	W		L	W		L
North Division
No. 20 Stanford xy	7	–	2	9	–	5
No. 16 Washington x	7	–	2	10	–	3
Washington State	6	–	3	9	–	4
Oregon	4	–	5	7	–	6
California	2	–	7	5	–	7
Oregon State	0	–	9	1	–	11
South Division
No. 12 USC xy$	8	–	1	11	–	3
Arizona State	6	–	3	7	–	6
Arizona	5	–	4	7	–	6
UCLA	4	–	5	6	–	7
Utah	3	–	6	7	–	6
Colorado	2	–	7	5	–	7
Championship: USC 31, Stanford 28
$ – Conference champion; x – Division champion/co-champions; y – Championship game participant; Rankings from AP Poll

The 2017 California Golden Bears football team represented the University of California, Berkeley in the 2017 NCAA Division I FBS football season. The Bears were led by first-year head coach Justin Wilcox and played their home games at California Memorial Stadium. The Bears went 5–7, including non-conference wins over North Carolina and Ole Miss, and three losses by three points or fewer. The season highlight was the Bears' 37–3 defeat of then-No. 8 Washington State, which marked the first time Cal had beaten a top ten opponent since its defeat of No. 3 USC in 2003.

== Recruiting ==
=== Position key ===
Back	B	Center	C	Cornerback	CB	Defensive back	DB
Defensive end	DE	Defensive lineman	DL	Defensive tackle	DT	End	E
Fullback	FB	Guard	G	Halfback	HB	Kicker	K
Kickoff returner	KR	Offensive tackle	OT	Offensive lineman	OL	Linebacker	LB
Long snapper	LS	Punter	P	Punt returner	PR	Quarterback	QB
Running back	RB	Safety	S	Tight end	TE	Wide receiver	WR

=== Recruits ===
The Golden Bears signed a total of 14 recruits.

College recruiting information (2017)
Name	Hometown	School	Height	Weight	Commit date
Gabriel Cherry; DE	Bakersfield, California	Centennial HS	6 ft 5 in (1.96 m)	265 lb (120 kg)	Feb 13, 2016
Gabriel Cherry; DE	Recruit ratings: Scout: Rivals: 247Sports: ESPN:				
Taariq Johnson; WR	Buena Park, California	Buena Park HS	6 ft 2 in (1.88 m)	213 lb (97 kg)	Apr 3, 2016
Taariq Johnson; WR	Recruit ratings: Scout: Rivals: 247Sports: ESPN:				
Jeremiah Hawkins; WR	Buena Park, California	Buena Park HS	5 ft 9 in (1.75 m)	170 lb (77 kg)	May 6, 2016
Jeremiah Hawkins; WR	Recruit ratings: Scout: Rivals: 247Sports: ESPN:				
Chase Garbers; QB	Newport Beach, California	Corona del Mar HS	6 ft 3 in (1.91 m)	205 lb (93 kg)	Jun 26, 2016
Chase Garbers; QB	Recruit ratings: Scout: Rivals: 247Sports: ESPN:				
Alex Funches; DE	Denton, Texas	Trinity Valley Community College	6 ft 2 in (1.88 m)	225 lb (102 kg)	Jul 6, 2016
Alex Funches; DE	Recruit ratings: Scout: Rivals: 247Sports: ESPN:				
Biaggo Ali Walsh; RB	Las Vegas, Nevada	Bishop Gorman HS	5 ft 10 in (1.78 m)	186 lb (84 kg)	Aug 14, 2016
Biaggo Ali Walsh; RB	Recruit ratings: Scout: Rivals: 247Sports: ESPN:				
Michael Saffell; C	Huntington Beach, California	Edison HS	6 ft 2 in (1.88 m)	293 lb (133 kg)	Oct 5, 2016
Michael Saffell; C	Recruit ratings: Scout: Rivals: 247Sports: ESPN:				
Elijah Hicks; CB	La Mirada, California	La Mirada HS	6 ft 0 in (1.83 m)	185 lb (84 kg)	Jan 10, 2017
Elijah Hicks; CB	Recruit ratings: Scout: Rivals: 247Sports: ESPN:				
Poutasi Poutasi; OG	Las Vegas, Nevada	Desert Pines HS	6 ft 4 in (1.93 m)	280 lb (130 kg)	Jan 28, 2017
Poutasi Poutasi; OG	Recruit ratings: Scout: Rivals: 247Sports: ESPN:				
Daniel Scott; S	La Cañada Flintridge, California	St. Francis HS	6 ft 3 in (1.91 m)	195 lb (88 kg)	Jan 29, 2017
Daniel Scott; S	Recruit ratings: Scout: Rivals: 247Sports: ESPN:				
Kyle Harmon; LB	Oakley, California	Freedom HS	6 ft 0 in (1.83 m)	218 lb (99 kg)	Jan 29, 2017
Kyle Harmon; LB	Recruit ratings: Scout: Rivals: 247Sports: ESPN:				
Gavin Reinwald; WR	Elk Grove, California	Elk Grove HS	6 ft 2 in (1.88 m)	225 lb (102 kg)	Jan 29, 2017
Gavin Reinwald; WR	Recruit ratings: Scout: Rivals: 247Sports: ESPN:				
Branden Smith; CB	Lancaster, California	Paraclete HS	5 ft 11 in (1.80 m)	175 lb (79 kg)	Feb 1, 2017
Branden Smith; CB	Recruit ratings: Scout: Rivals: 247Sports: ESPN:				
Ben Moos; TE	Pullman, Washington	Pullman HS	6 ft 3 in (1.91 m)	240 lb (110 kg)	Feb 1, 2017
Ben Moos; TE	Recruit ratings: Scout: Rivals: 247Sports: ESPN:				
Overall recruit ranking:
Note: In many cases, Scout, Rivals, 247Sports, On3, and ESPN may conflict in their listings of height and weight.; In these cases, the average was taken. ESPN grades are on a 100-point scale.; Sources: "California Football Commitments". Rivals.; "2017 California Football Commits". Scout.; "ESPN". ESPN.; "Scout.com Team Recruiting Rankings". Scout.; "2017 Team Ranking". Rivals.com.

== Personnel ==
=== Coaching staff ===
Name	Position	Seasons at Cal	Before Cal
Justin Wilcox	Head coach	1st as head coach (LB coach, 2003–2005)	Wisconsin – Defensive coordinator (2016)
Beau Baldwin	Assistant head coach / offensive coordinator / running backs coach	1st year	Eastern Washington – Head coach (2008–16)
Tim DeRuyter	Defensive coordinator / inside linebackers coach	1st year	Fresno State – Head coach (2012–16)
Gerald Alexander	Defensive backs coach	1st year	Montana State – Defensive backs coach (2016)
Jerry Azzinaro	Defensive line coach	1st year	San Francisco 49ers – Defensive line coach (2016)
Steve Greatwood	Offensive line coach	1st year	Oregon – Offensive line / defensive line coach (2000–16)
Marques Tuiasosopo	Quarterbacks coach / Passing Game Coordinator / recruiting coordinator	1st year	UCLA – Quarterbacks coach / passing game coordinator (2016)
Nicholas Edwards	Wide receivers coach	1st year	Eastern Washington – Wide receivers coach (2014–16)
Charlie Ragle	Special teams coordinator / tight ends coach	1st year	Arizona – Special teams coordinator (2013–17)
Tony Tuioti	Outside linebackers coach	1st year	Cleveland Browns – Quality Control, Defense (2014–15)
Desmond Bishop	Quality Control, Defense	1st as asst. coach (LB, 2005–2006)	Washington Redskins – Linebacker (2016)
Erik Meyer	Quality Control, Offensive	1st year	La Mirada HS (CA) – Quarterbacks coach (2008–16)

=== Roster ===
2017 California Golden Bears Football
Quarterback: 3 Ross Bowers – (redshirt) sophomore (6'2, 190); 7 Chase Garbers – freshman (6'2, 210); 11 Brandon McIlwain – sophomore (6'1, 195); 14 Chase Forrest – (redshirt) junior (6'2, 205); Running back: 4 Zion Echols – (redshirt) freshman (5'8, 180); 5 Tre Watson – senior (5'11, 205); 22 Derrick Clark – (redshirt) freshman (5'10, 210); 23 Vic Enwere – senior (6'0, 245); 26 Biaggo Ali Walsh – freshman (5'10, 190); 28 Patrick Laird – (redshirt) junior (6'0, 200); 30 Billy McCrary III – junior (5'11, 210); 34 Fabiano Hale – (redshirt) senior (6'0, 225); Wide receiver: 1 Melquise Stovall – sophomore (5'9, 185); 2 Jordan Duncan – sophomore (6'1, 210); 6 Jeremiah Hawkins – freshman (5'8, 170); 8 Demetris Robertson – sophomore (6'0, 185); 9 Kanawai Noa – (redshirt) sophomore (6'0, 180); 13 Grayson Bankhead – (redshirt) freshman (6'0, 170); 15 Jordan Veasy – (redshirt) senior (6'3, 225); 17 Vic Wharton III – (redshirt) junior (5'11, 210); 19 Brandon Singleton – (redshirt) sophomore (6'0, 170); 24 Matt Rockett – (redshirt) sophomore (5'9, 195); 31 Chas Peterson – (redshirt) senior (5'11, 185); 38 Alex Netherda – (redshirt) sophomore (6'0, 205); 88 Taariq Johnson – freshman (6'2, 220); Tight end: 11 Raymond Hudson – (redshirt) senior (6'3, 245); 16 Collin Moore – freshman (6'4, 225); 80 Jake Ashton – (redshirt) junior (6'3, 235); 83 Ben Moos – freshman (6'4, 235); 84 Gavin Reinwald – freshman (6'3, 215); 87 Kyle Wells – (redshirt) junior (6'3, 245); 89 Matt Laris – (redshirt) freshman (6'3, 235); 99 Malik McMorris – junior (5'11, 300) (+FB); Punter: 37 Steven Coutts – junior (6'4, 210); 42 Dylan Klumph – (redshirt) junior (6'2, 235)	Offensive lineman: 53 Michael Saffell – freshman (6'2, 295); 54 Gentle Williams – (redshirt) freshman (6'3, 295); 57 Addison Ooms – (redshirt) junior (6'4, 300); 58 Semisi Uluave – junior (6'5, 345); 60 Daniel Juarez – freshman (6'5, 290); 61 Valentino Daltoso – (redshirt) freshman (6'4, 310); 65 Tanner Prenovost – (redshirt) freshman (6'0, 265); 70 Poutasi Poutasi – freshman (6'4, 305); 71 Jake Curhan – (redshirt) freshman (6'6, 325); 72 Kamryn Bennett – (redshirt) junior (6'3, 310); 74 Ryan Gibson – (redshirt) sophomore (6'2, 285); 76 Henry Bazakas – (redshirt) sophomore (6'6, 300); 77 J.D. Hinnant – (redshirt) senior (6'4, 300); 79 Patrick Mekari – junior (6'4, 300); Defensive end: 9 James Looney – (redshirt) senior (6'3, 280); 44 Zeandae Johnson – (redshirt) sophomore (6'4, 280); 90 Rusty Becker – (redshirt) senior (6'4, 280); 91 Chinedu Udeogu – (redshirt) freshman (6'4, 250); 92 Gabe Cherry – freshman (6'5, 260); 96 Tevin Paul – (redshirt) freshman (6'4, 270); Nose guard: 50 Hunter Abel – (redshirt) sophomore (6'0, 275); 93 Luc Bequette – (redshirt) sophomore (6'2, 290); 97 Tony Mekari – (redshirt) senior (6'1, 295); 98 Chris Palmer – (redshirt) junior (6'2, 320); Outside Linebacker: 13 Russell Ude – (redshirt) sophomore (6'3, 245); 19 Cameron Goode – (redshirt) freshman (6'3, 225); 33 Noah Westerfield – senior (6'3, 250); 36 Alex Funches – junior (6'2, 230); 46 Drew Bryant – (redshirt) junior (6'2, 220); 51 Cameron Saffle – junior (6'3, 250); 89 Evan Weaver – sophomore (6'3, 250); 94 Trevor Howard – (redshirt) sophomore (6'3, 250); Placekicker: 9 Matt Anderson – (redshirt) senior (6'0, 195); 41 Gabe Siemieniec – (redshirt) freshman (6'1, 220); 49 Matt Abramo – (redshirt) sophomore (6'3, 190)	Inside Linebacker: 1 Devante Downs – senior (6'3, 245); 11 Hamilton Anoa'i – senior (6'2, 255); 31 Raymond Davison – (redshirt) senior (6'2, 235); 40 David Ortega Jr. – (redshirt) junior (5'9, 210); 41 Gerran Brown – (redshirt) sophomore (6'2, 220); 43 Kyle Harmon – freshman (6'1, 240) (+OLB); 55 Aisea Tongilava – (redshirt) junior (6'1, 220); 59 Jordan Kunaszyk – (redshirt) junior (6'3, 235); Cornerback: 2 Darius Allensworth – (redshirt) senior (5'11, 195); 3 Elijah Hicks – freshman (5'11, 180); 8 Nygel Edmonds – (redshirt) freshman (5'11, 190); 16 Chibuzo Nwokocha – (redshirt) junior (6'1, 185); 18 Marloshawn Franklin Jr. – senior (5'11, 190); 20 Joshua Drayden – sophomore (5'9, 185); 22 Traveon Beck – sophomore (5'9, 160); 24 Camryn Bynum – (redshirt) freshman (6'0, 180); 27 Ashtyn Davis – (redshirt) sophomore (6'1, 195); Defensive back: 10 Daniel Scott – freshman (6'2, 200); 45 Branden Smith – freshman (5'10, 170); Safety: 4 Derron Brown – (redshirt) junior (6'1, 210); 5 Trey Turner – junior (6'1, 190); 6 Jaylinn Hawkins – (redshirt) sophomore (6'2, 200); 17 Luke Rubenzer – senior (5'11, 200); 21 Evan Rambo – (redshirt) sophomore (6'4, 210); 23 Malik Psalms – (redshirt) sophomore (6'1, 185); 28 Quentin Tartabull – (redshirt) junior (5'11, 205); 29 Bryce Turner – (redshirt) freshman (5'10, 175); 32 Jacob Anderson – (redshirt) senior (5'11, 195); 34 De'Zhon Grace – (redshirt) senior (5'9, 180); 39 Ricky Walker III – (redshirt) freshman (5'11, 200); Long snapper: 45 Grant Gluhaich – (redshirt) sophomore (5'11, 200); 46 Garrett Frum – senior (6'1, 230); 47 Alonso Vera – junior (5'11, 225); Fullback: 40 Justin Norbeck – (redshirt) junior (6'0, 235)
Source and player details:

== Schedule ==
Date	Time	Opponent	Site	TV	Result	Attendance
September 2	9:20 a.m.	at North Carolina*	Kenan Memorial Stadium; Chapel Hill, NC	ACCN	W 35–30	49,500
September 9	2:00 p.m.	No. 25 (FCS) Weber State*	California Memorial Stadium; Berkeley, CA	P12N	W 33–20	36,209
September 16	7:30 p.m.	Ole Miss*	California Memorial Stadium; Berkeley, CA	ESPN	W 27–16	37,125
September 23	12:30 p.m.	No. 5 USC	California Memorial Stadium; Berkeley, CA (Joe Roth Memorial Game)	ABC	L 20–30	46,747
September 30	7:30 p.m.	at Oregon	Autzen Stadium; Eugene, OR	FS1	L 24–45	55,707
October 7	7:45 p.m.	at No. 6 Washington	Husky Stadium; Seattle, WA	ESPN	L 7–38	67,429
October 13	7:30 p.m.	No. 8 Washington State	California Memorial Stadium; Berkeley, CA	ESPN	W 37–3	26,244
October 21	4:00 p.m.	Arizona^{†}	California Memorial Stadium; Berkeley, CA	P12N	L 44–45 ^{2OT}	37,525
October 28	11:00 a.m.	at Colorado	Folsom Field; Boulder, CO	P12N	L 28–44	47,216
November 4	2:00 p.m.	Oregon State	California Memorial Stadium; Berkeley, CA	P12N	W 37–23	35,440
November 18	5:00 p.m.	at No. 20 Stanford	Stanford Stadium; Stanford, CA (Big Game)	FOX	L 14–17	51,424
November 24	7:30 p.m.	at UCLA	Rose Bowl; Pasadena, CA (rivalry)	FS1	L 27–30	50,287
*Non-conference game; ^{†}Homecoming; Rankings from AP Poll released prior to the game; All times are in Pacific time

== Game summaries ==
=== at North Carolina ===
	1	2	3	4	Total
Golden Bears	7	7	7	14	35
Tar Heels	7	10	7	6	30

=== Weber State ===
	1	2	3	4	Total
No. 25 (FCS) Wildcats	10	10	0	0	20
Golden Bears	7	10	0	16	33

=== Ole Miss ===
	1	2	3	4	Total
Rebels	10	6	0	0	16
Golden Bears	7	0	10	10	27

=== USC ===
	1	2	3	4	Total
No. 5 Trojans	3	10	0	17	30
Golden Bears	3	10	0	7	20

=== at Oregon ===
	1	2	3	4	Total
Golden Bears	0	7	7	10	24
Ducks	17	0	7	21	45

=== at Washington ===
	1	2	3	4	Total
Golden Bears	0	0	7	0	7
No. 6 Huskies	7	17	7	7	38

=== Washington State ===
	1	2	3	4	Total
No. 8 Cougars	0	3	0	0	3
Golden Bears	10	7	3	17	37

- The game marked Cal's first win against a top ten opponent since 2003.
- The three points allowed by the Bears defense are the fewest since holding UC Davis to three points in 2010.
- In the fourth quarter, quarterback Ross Bowers executed a flip into the end zone to put the Bears up 27-3.

=== Arizona ===
	1	2	3	4	OT	2OT	Total
Wildcats	14	7	7	3	7	7	45
Golden Bears	7	0	14	10	7	6	44

=== at Colorado ===
	1	2	3	4	Total
Golden Bears	7	7	0	14	28
Buffaloes	14	13	0	17	44

=== Oregon State ===
	1	2	3	4	Total
Beavers	7	6	7	3	23
Golden Bears	14	6	10	7	37

- The game was the sixth time in program history that Cal had zero punts in a game. It was the first time that Cal had zero punts in a game since playing USC in 2004.
- Matt Anderson broke the Cal record for career scoring, reaching 297 points after kicking three field goals and four extra points in the game. He broke the previous record of 288 points held by Doug Brien since 1993. Anderson would finish the season with an all-time record of 316 points.
- Patrick Laird's 214 yards rushing ranks tenth in program history for rushing yards in a single game.

=== at Stanford ===
	1	2	3	4	Total
Golden Bears	3	3	8	0	14
No. 22 Cardinal	3	7	7	0	17

=== at UCLA ===
	1	2	3	4	Total
Golden Bears	3	6	8	10	27
Bruins	7	10	7	6	30

- Matt Anderson broke the Cal record for career field goals, reaching 60 after kicking four field goals in the game. He broke the previous record of 56 field goals held by Doug Brien since 1993.
- Ross Bowers reached 3,000 passing yards for the season and became the seventh player in Cal history to reach the milestone.
- Patrick Laird reached 1,000 rushing yards for the season and became the sixteenth player in Cal history to reach the milestone.

== Awards and honors ==
=== Coaches ===
- Tim DeRuyter (Defensive Coordinator)

Athlon Sports' National Defensive Coordinator of the Week, vs. Washington State

=== Offense ===
- Ross Bowers (QB)

Manning Award Stars of the Week, vs. North Carolina

- Patrick Laird (RB)

Burlsworth Trophy semifinalist
First-team Pac-12 All-Academic
All-Pac-12 Honorable Mention
CoSIDA Academic All-District Team

- Malik McMorris (FB)

SB Nation Piesman Trophy finalist

- Kanawai Noa (WR)

Polynesian College Football Player of the Year Award watchlist

- Vic Wharton III (WR)

Biletnikoff Award watchlist

- Jake Curhan (OL)

Second-team Pac-12 All-Academic

- Patrick Mekari (OL)

All-Pac-12 Honorable Mention

- Tony Mekari (G)

Second-team Pac-12 All-Academic

=== Defense ===
- James Looney (DL)

All-Pac-12 Honorable Mention

- Devante Downs (LB)

Chuck Bednarik Award watchlist
Lott IMPACT Trophy watchlist
All-Pac-12 Honorable Mention
Pac-12 Defensive Player of the Week, at North Carolina
Pac-12 Defensive Player of the Week(2), vs. Ole Miss
College Sports Madness National Defensive Player of the Week, vs. Ole Miss
College Sports Madness Pac-12 Defensive Player of the Week, vs. Ole Miss

- Jordan Kunaszyk (LB)

Pac-12 Defensive Player of the Week, vs. Washington State
Rose Bowl: Pac-12 Defensive Player of the Week, vs. Washington State
Walter Camp National Defensive Player of the Week, vs. Washington State
College Sports Madness Pac-12 Defensive Player of the Week, vs. Washington State

- Luke Rubenzer (S)

First-team Pac-12 All-Academic

=== Special teams ===
- Matt Anderson (PK)

Pac-12 Football Scholar-Athlete of the Year
Campbell Trophy semifinalist
Lou Groza Award pre-season watchlist
Senior CLASS Award candidate
Second-team Pac-12 All-Academic
CoSIDA Academic All-District Team
