= 2017 Oregon State Beavers football team =

American college football season

2017 Oregon State Beavers football
- Conference: Pac-12 Conference
- North Division
- Record: 1–11 (0–9 Pac-12)
- Head coach: Gary Andersen (3rd season; resigned after 6 games); Cory Hall (interim; final 6 games)
- Co-offensive coordinators: Kevin McGiven (2nd season); T. J. Woods (2nd season)
- Offensive scheme: Spread
- Defensive coordinator: Kevin Clune (2nd season)
- Base defense: 3–4
- Home stadium: Reser Stadium

2017 Pac-12 Conference football standings
	Conf.			Overall
Team	W		L	W		L
North Division
No. 20 Stanford xy	7	–	2	9	–	5
No. 16 Washington x	7	–	2	10	–	3
Washington State	6	–	3	9	–	4
Oregon	4	–	5	7	–	6
California	2	–	7	5	–	7
Oregon State	0	–	9	1	–	11
South Division
No. 12 USC xy$	8	–	1	11	–	3
Arizona State	6	–	3	7	–	6
Arizona	5	–	4	7	–	6
UCLA	4	–	5	6	–	7
Utah	3	–	6	7	–	6
Colorado	2	–	7	5	–	7
Championship: USC 31, Stanford 28
$ – Conference champion; x – Division champion/co-champions; y – Championship game participant; Rankings from AP Poll

The 2017 Oregon State Beavers Football Team represented Oregon State University during the 2017 NCAA Division I FBS football season. The team played their home games on campus at Reser Stadium in Corvallis, Oregon as a member of the North Division of the Pac-12 Conference.

The Beavers entered the season with Gary Andersen as coach in his third year. After his squad opened with losses in five of their first six games, with their only win coming against FCS Portland State, Andersen agreed to resign as coach. The team promoted second year cornerbacks coach, Cory Hall, to interim head coach.

They finished the season 1–11, 0–9 in Pac-12 play to finish in last place in the North Division.

== Preseason ==
In the Pac-12 preseason media poll, the Beavers were picked to finish in fifth place in the North Division.

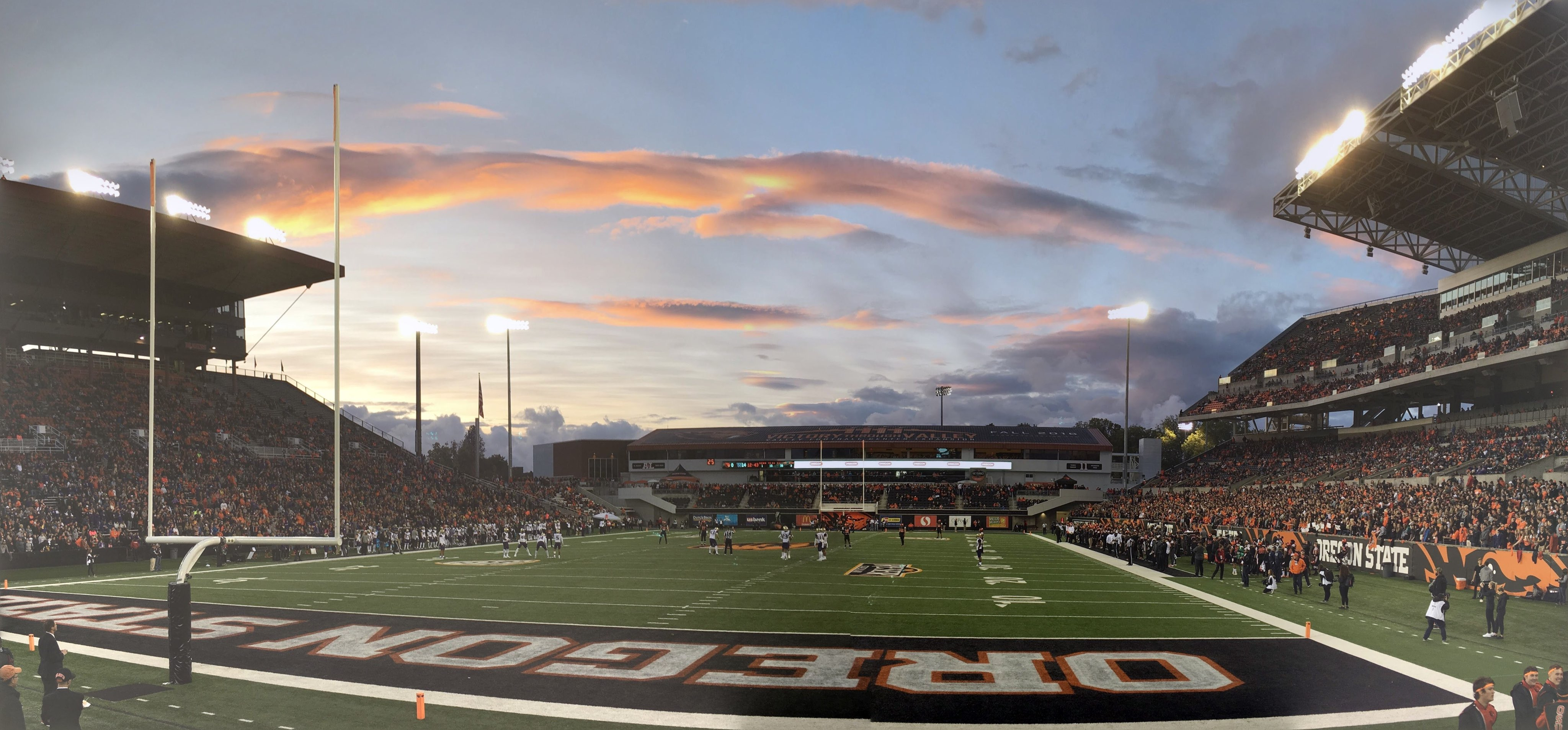
Reser Stadium taken September 30th, 2017 from South End Zone

== Schedule ==
Date	Time	Opponent	Site	TV	Result	Attendance
August 26	12:00 p.m.	at Colorado State*	Colorado State Stadium; Fort Collins, CO	CBSSN	L 27–58	37,583
September 2	11:00 a.m.	Portland State*	Reser Stadium; Corvallis, OR	P12N	W 35–32	34,737
September 9	7:00 p.m.	Minnesota*	Reser Stadium; Corvallis, OR	FS1	L 14–48	35,206
September 16	2:30 p.m.	at No. 21 Washington State	Martin Stadium; Pullman, WA	P12N	L 23–52	32,487
September 30	5:00 p.m.	No. 6 Washington	Reser Stadium; Corvallis, OR	P12N	L 7–42	37,821
October 7	1:00 p.m.	at No. 14 USC	Los Angeles Memorial Coliseum; Los Angeles, CA	P12N	L 10–38	60,314
October 14	1:00 p.m.	Colorado^{†}	Reser Stadium; Corvallis, OR	P12N	L 33–36	33,785
October 26	6:00 p.m.	No. 20 Stanford	Reser Stadium; Corvallis, OR	ESPN	L 14–15	30,912
November 4	2:00 p.m.	at California	California Memorial Stadium; Berkeley, CA	P12N	L 23–37	35,440
November 11	7:00 p.m.	at Arizona	Arizona Stadium; Tucson, AZ	ESPN2	L 28–49	40,984
November 18	12:00 p.m.	Arizona State	Reser Stadium; Corvallis, OR	P12N	L 24–40	36,063
November 25	4:00 p.m.	at Oregon	Autzen Stadium; Eugene, OR (121st Civil War)	ESPN2	L 10–69	57,475
*Non-conference game; ^{†}Homecoming; Rankings from AP Poll released prior to the game; All times are in Pacific time

== Roster ==
2017 Oregon State Beavers football team roster
Players
Coaches
Offense

Pos.	#	Name	Class
QB	6	Jake Luton	Jr
QB	10	Darell Garretson	Sr
QB	12	Conor Blount	So
QB	16	Aidan Willard	Fr
RB	4	Thomas Tyner	Sr
RB	20	B. J. Baylor	Fr
RB	21	Artavis Pierce	So
RB	23	Calvin Tyler Jr.	Jr
RB	24	Trevorris Johnson	Sr
RB	30	Hunter Mattson	Fr
RB	34	Ryan Nall	Jr
WR	5	Kolby Taylor	Fr
WR	7	Xavier Hawkins	Sr
WR	8	Trevon Bradford	So
WR	9	Tino Allen	Fr
WR	13	Jordan Villamin	Sr
WR	16	Champ Flemings	Fr
WR	17	Isaiah Hodgins	Fr
WR	18	Timmy Hernandez	Jr
WR	19	Aaron Short	Jr
WR	22	Seth Collins	Jr
WR	80	Connor Laverty	Fr
WR	86	Andre Bodden	So
WR	88	Mikey Alfieri	Fr
TE	81	Noah Togiai	Jr
TE	82	Tuly Wily-Matagi	So
TE	83	Quinn Smith	Jr
TE	87	Bryce Bramscher	Fr
TE	89	Jack Holum	Fr
OL	51	Kammy Delp	Jr
OL	52	Sumner Houston	Jr
OL	55	Keli'i Montibon	So
OL	61	Andrew Iademarco	So
OL	63	Gus Lavaka	So
OL	64	Fred Lauina	Sr
OL	65	Onesimus Clarke	Fr
OL	67	Trent Moore	Jr
OL	69	Nous Keobounnam	Fr
OL	71	Brock Wellsfry	Fr
OL	72	Miki Fifita	So
OL	73	Blake Brandel	So
OL	75	Justin Sattelmaier	So
OL	76	Yanni Demogerontas	Jr
OL	78	Clay Cordasco	Jr
OL	79	Travis Mackay	Fr

Defense

Pos.	#	Name	Class
CB	2	Shawn Wilson	So
CB	4	Dwayne Williams	Jr
CB	5	Xavier Crawford	So
CB	6	Jay Irvine	So
CB	14	Kaleb Hayes	Fr
CB	22	Isaiah Dunn	Fr
CB	24	Justin Gardner	Fr
CB	26	Jaydon Grant	Fr
CB	27	Kyle White	Sr
CB	29	Christian Wallace	Fr
S	3	Brandon Arnold	Sr
S	10	Omar Hicks-Onu	So
S	12	David Morris	Fr
S	13	Landry Payne	Sr
S	15	Mason Moran	Fr
S	17	Tyler DeLashmutt	So
S	23	Austin Hudson	Jr
S	29	Jordan Gregory	Fr
S	30	Drew Kell	Jr
S	33	Jalen Moore	So
S	34	Moku Watson	Fr
S	36	Jeffrey Manning Jr.	Fr
S	38	Trajon Cotton	Fr
LB	35	Kameron Carroll	Jr
LB	44	Kesi Ah-Hoy	Fr
LB	47	Alexander Skelton	Fr
LB	45	Ralph Taufa'Asau	Fr
ILB	32	Jonathan Willis	Jr
ILB	42	Doug Taumoelau	Fr
ILB	46	Nick Janakes	Fr
ILB	49	Andrzej Hughes-Murray	So
ILB	50	Wesley Payne	Sr
ILB	51	Luke Leonnig	Fr
ILB	53	Emony Robinson	Fr
ILB	55	Manase Hungalu	Sr
ILB	58	Hamilton Hunt	So
OLB	1	Bright Ugwoegbu	Jr
OLB	37	Kee Whetzel	Fr
OLB	41	Shemar Smith	So
OLB	43	Adam Soesman	Jr
OLB	48	Reed Woodward	Fr
OLB	54	Shemiah Unutoa-Whitson	So
OLB	59	Hamilcar Rashed Jr.	Fr
DE	40	Jaelen Bush	Fr
DE	56	Thor Katoa	So
DE	77	Cody Anderson	Fr
DE	90	Phillip Napoleon	Sr
DE	93	Titus Failauga	Sr
DE	95	Baker Pritchard	Sr
DE	96	Lamone Williams	Jr
DE	98	Ricky Liuchan	So
DT	57	Chris Mengis	So
DT	92	Paisa Savea	So
DT	97	Kalani Vakameilalo	Jr
DT	99	Elu Aydon	So

Special teams

Pos.	#	Name	Class
K	28	Zach Standish	So
K	39	Daniel Rodriguez	So
K	46	Jordan Choukair	So
K	85	Nick Van Valkenburg	Fr
P	31	Nick Porebski	Sr
P	38	Alex Bland	So
LS	40	Keegan Firth	So
LS	57	Connor Kelsey	Jr
LS	60	Tommy Merickel	So

Head coach

- Gary Andersen
- Cory Hall (Interim)

Coordinators/assistant coaches

- Kevin McGiven (OC)
- Telly Lockette (RB)
- Dave Baldwin (TE)

Legend

- (C) Team captain
- (S) Suspended
- (I) Ineligible
- Injured
- Redshirt

Roster

== Game summaries ==
=== At Colorado State ===
	1	2	3	4	Total
Beavers	10	10	0	7	27
Rams	7	17	10	24	58

=== Portland State ===
	1	2	3	4	Total
Vikings	6	0	20	6	32
Beavers	7	7	14	7	35

=== Minnesota ===
	1	2	3	4	Total
Golden Gophers	10	10	14	14	48
Beavers	0	14	0	0	14

=== At Washington State ===
	1	2	3	4	Total
Beavers	2	7	7	7	23
No. 21 Cougars	7	21	14	10	52

=== Washington ===
	1	2	3	4	Total
No. 6 Huskies	7	0	21	14	42
Beavers	0	0	0	7	7

=== At USC ===
	1	2	3	4	Total
Beavers	0	3	0	7	10
No. 14 Trojans	14	7	7	10	38

=== Colorado ===
	1	2	3	4	Total
Buffaloes	7	7	7	15	36
Beavers	10	9	7	7	33

=== Stanford ===
	1	2	3	4	Total
No. 20 Cardinal	0	6	3	6	15
Beavers	0	7	7	0	14

=== At California ===
	1	2	3	4	Total
Beavers	7	6	7	3	23
Golden Bears	14	6	10	7	37

=== At Arizona ===
	1	2	3	4	Total
Beavers	0	0	14	14	28
Wildcats	14	14	14	7	49

=== Arizona State ===
	1	2	3	4	Total
Sun Devils	16	14	3	7	40
Beavers	0	7	3	14	24

=== At Oregon ===
	1	2	3	4	Total
Beavers	7	0	3	0	10
Ducks	17	35	10	7	69
