= 2017 Utah Utes football team =

American college football season

2017 Utah Utes football

Heart of Dallas Bowl champion

Heart of Dallas Bowl, W 30–14 vs. West Virginia
- Conference: Pac-12 Conference
- South Division
- Record: 7–6 (3–6 Pac-12)
- Head coach: Kyle Whittingham (13th season)
- Offensive coordinator: Troy Taylor (1st season)
- Offensive scheme: West Coast
- Defensive coordinator: Morgan Scalley (2nd season)
- Base defense: 4–3
- Home stadium: Rice-Eccles Stadium

2017 Pac-12 Conference football standings
	Conf.			Overall
Team	W		L	W		L
North Division
No. 20 Stanford xy	7	–	2	9	–	5
No. 16 Washington x	7	–	2	10	–	3
Washington State	6	–	3	9	–	4
Oregon	4	–	5	7	–	6
California	2	–	7	5	–	7
Oregon State	0	–	9	1	–	11
South Division
No. 12 USC xy$	8	–	1	11	–	3
Arizona State	6	–	3	7	–	6
Arizona	5	–	4	7	–	6
UCLA	4	–	5	6	–	7
Utah	3	–	6	7	–	6
Colorado	2	–	7	5	–	7
Championship: USC 31, Stanford 28
$ – Conference champion; x – Division champion/co-champions; y – Championship game participant; Rankings from AP Poll

The 2017 Utah Utes football team represented the University of Utah during the 2017 NCAA Division I FBS football season. The team was coached by thirteenth-year head coach Kyle Whittingham and played their home games in Rice-Eccles Stadium in Salt Lake City, Utah. They competed as members of the South Division of the Pac-12 Conference. They finished the season 7–6, 3–6 in Pac-12 play to finish in fifth place in the South Division. They were invited to the Heart of Dallas Bowl where they defeated West Virginia.

== Schedule ==
Utah announced their 2017 football schedule on January 18, 2017. The Utes played FCS North Dakota, in-state rival BYU, and San Jose State in out-of-conference play. In Pac-12 conference play, the Utes did not play cross-divisional foes California and Oregon State.

Date	Time	Opponent	Rank	Site	TV	Result	Attendance
August 31	5:30 p.m.	No. 8 (FCS) North Dakota*		Rice-Eccles Stadium; Salt Lake City, UT	P12N	W 37–16	45,905
September 9	8:15 p.m.	at BYU*		LaVell Edwards Stadium; Provo, UT (Holy War/Beehive Boot)	ESPN2	W 19–13	63,470
September 16	8:00 p.m.	San Jose State*		Rice-Eccles Stadium; Salt Lake City, UT	ESPN2	W 54–16	45,881
September 22	8:00 p.m.	at Arizona	No. 23	Arizona Stadium; Tucson, AZ	FS1	W 30–24	36,651
October 7	8:15 p.m.	Stanford^{†}	No. 20	Rice-Eccles Stadium; Salt Lake City, UT	FS1	L 20–23	45,991
October 14	5:00 p.m.	at No. 13 USC		Los Angeles Memorial Coliseum; Los Angeles, CA	ABC	L 27–28	72,382
October 21	1:30 p.m.	Arizona State		Rice-Eccles Stadium; Salt Lake City, UT	FS1	L 10–30	45,863
October 28	3:45 p.m.	at Oregon		Autzen Stadium; Eugene, OR	P12N	L 20–41	56,154
November 3	7:30 p.m.	UCLA		Rice-Eccles Stadium; Salt Lake City, UT	FS1	W 48–17	45,902
November 11	3:30 p.m.	No. 19 Washington State		Rice-Eccles Stadium; Salt Lake City, UT	P12N	L 25–33	45,826
November 18	7:30 p.m.	at No. 16 Washington		Husky Stadium; Seattle, WA	ESPN	L 30–33	65,767
November 25	8:00 p.m.	Colorado		Rice-Eccles Stadium; Salt Lake City, UT (Rumble in the Rockies)	FS1	W 34–13	46,022
December 26	11:30 a.m.	vs. West Virginia*		Cotton Bowl; Dallas, TX (Heart of Dallas Bowl)	ESPN	W 30–14	20,507
*Non-conference game; ^{†}Homecoming; Rankings from AP Poll released prior to the game; All times are in Mountain time

== Game summaries ==
=== North Dakota ===
	1	2	3	4	Total
#8 (FCS) Fighting Hawks	3	6	0	7	16
Utes	0	17	10	10	37

=== At BYU ===
	1	2	3	4	Total
Utes	3	6	10	0	19
Cougars	0	0	6	7	13

=== San Jose State ===
	1	2	3	4	Total
Spartans	3	10	0	3	16
Utes	9	21	7	17	54

=== At Arizona ===
	1	2	3	4	Total
#23 Utes	10	3	14	3	30
Wildcats	3	7	7	7	24

=== Stanford ===
	1	2	3	4	Total
Cardinal	3	10	3	7	23
#20 Utes	7	3	3	7	20

=== At USC ===
	1	2	3	4	Total
Utes	7	14	0	6	27
#13 Trojans	7	0	7	14	28

=== Arizona State ===
	1	2	3	4	Total
Sun Devils	9	7	7	7	30
Utes	0	0	3	7	10

=== At Oregon ===
	1	2	3	4	Total
Utes	0	6	7	7	20
Ducks	7	10	10	14	41

=== UCLA ===
	1	2	3	4	Total
Bruins	0	10	0	7	17
Utes	7	10	21	10	48

=== Washington State ===
	1	2	3	4	Total
#19 Cougars	13	7	6	7	33
Utes	0	10	0	15	25

=== At Washington ===
	1	2	3	4	Total
Utes	7	6	10	7	30
#16 Huskies	6	10	7	10	33

=== Colorado ===
	1	2	3	4	Total
Buffaloes	0	0	7	6	13
Utes	14	14	3	3	34

=== Vs. West Virginia (Heart of Dallas Bowl) ===
	1	2	3	4	Total
Mountaineers	0	3	3	8	14
Utes	7	10	0	13	30

== Rankings ==
Ranking movements Legend: ██ Increase in ranking ██ Decrease in ranking — = Not ranked RV = Received votes
	Week															
Poll	Pre	1	2	3	4	5	6	7	8	9	10	11	12	13	14	Final
AP	RV	RV	RV	23	20	20	RV	RV	—	—	—	—	—	—	—	—
Coaches	25	23	24	21	19	18	23	RV	—	—	—	—	—	—	—	RV
CFP	Not released									—	—	—	—	—	—	Not released

== Coaching staff ==
Name	Title	Years at Utah
Kyle Whittingham	Head coach	13
Morgan Scalley	Defensive coordinator/safeties coach	10
Troy Taylor	Offensive coordinator/quarterbacks coach	1
Jim Harding	Assistant head coach/offensive line coach	4
Sharrieff Shah	Cornerbacks coach/co-Special teams coordinator	6
Justin Ena	Linebackers coach/co-Special teams coordinator	3
Lewis Powell	Defensive line coach	3
Freddie Whittingham	Tight ends coach	2
Guy Holliday	Wide receivers coach	2
Kiel McDonald	Running backs coach	1
