= Cory Hall =

American football player and coach (born 1976)

Biographical details
- Born: December 5, 1976 (age 49); Bakersfield, California, U.S.

Playing career
- 1995–1998: Fresno State
- 1999–2002: Cincinnati Bengals
- 2003–2004: Atlanta Falcons
- Position: Safety

Coaching career (HC unless noted)
- 2005: Washington State (GA)
- 2008–2011: Clovis North HS (CA) (assistant)
- 2011–2013: Clovis North HS (CA)
- 2014: Wisconsin (GA)
- 2015: Weber State (DB)
- 2016–2017: Oregon State (CB)
- 2017: Oregon State (interim HC)
- 2018: Central Michigan (DB)

Head coaching record
- Overall: 0–6 (college); 32–8 (high school)

Cory Hall (born December 5, 1976) is an American football coach and former player. He was selected by the Cincinnati Bengals in the third round of the 1999 NFL draft. He played college football for the Fresno State Bulldogs. Hall also played for the Atlanta Falcons. In 2017, Hall served as Oregon State's interim head football coach for six games after Gary Andersen abruptly resigned.

== Coaching career ==
Hall was the head coach at Clovis North High School for three seasons, from 2011 to 2013. While coaching at CNEC, he led the Broncos to a 32–8 record, a CIF Central Valley Championship in both Division I and Division II football, and secured second place in the Central Section in 2012. In a turn of events, Hall left Clovis North High School to pursue a coaching career at the collegiate level. Hall served as a graduate assistant under Beavers coach Gary Andersen at Wisconsin in 2014 before spending 2015 as secondary coach at Weber State. Hall was then named cornerbacks coach at Oregon State in 2016.

On October 9, 2017, Hall was named the interim head coach of Oregon State after the university and Gary Andersen decided to mutually part ways. Although Hall won the support of fans and the locker room, the Beavers struggled. Following two close losses to Colorado, 36-33, and No. 20 Stanford, 15-14, the Beavers were blown out in their final four games. Hall departed Oregon State following the season to become defensive backs coach at Central Michigan University under John Bonamego. Central Michigan fired Bonamego following the 2018 season and hired Jim McElwain to replace him; Hall originally decided to stay before resigning in February 2019.

== Head coaching record ==
=== College ===
Year	Team	Overall	Conference	Standing	Bowl/playoffs
Oregon State Beavers (Pac-12 Conference) (2017)
2017	Oregon State	0–6 (Note: Gary Andersen was the head coach for the first six games of the season. On October 9, 2017, Hall was named interim head coach after the university and Andersen mutually agreed to part ways.)	0–6	6th (North)	
Oregon State:		0–6	0–6		
Total:		0–6			
