= Peter Hansen (American football) =

American football player and coach (born 1979)

Carolina Panthers
- Title: Assistant defensive coordinator/linebackers coach

Personal information
- Born: May 30, 1979 (age 47); Palo Alto, California, U.S.

Career information
- College: Arizona

Career history
- Stanford (2008) Strength and conditioning; Stanford (2009–2010) Defensive assistant; San Francisco 49ers (2011–2013) Defensive assistant / quality control coach; Stanford (2014–2019) Inside linebackers coach; UNLV (2020–2021) Defensive coordinator & inside linebackers coach; Denver Broncos (2022) Linebackers coach; Carolina Panthers (2023–present); Linebackers coach (2023-2025); Assistant defensive coordinator/linebackers coach (2026-present)

Peter Scott Hansen (born May 30, 1979) is an American football coach and former player who is the assistant defensive coordinator and linebackers coach for the Carolina Panthers of the National Football League (NFL).

== Playing career ==
Hansen attended Palo Alto High School where played football for his father, head coach Earl Hansen. Peter quarterbacked the Vikings to their first-ever Central Coast Section in 1995 and scored two touchdowns in a 14–10 win over Saratoga High School in the Division IV finals. Hansen played both football and basketball at the University of Arizona. At Arizona, he blocked seven field goals and point-after attempts during his career and earned second team all-Pac-10 Conference honors in 2000 as a special teams performer. Following his graduation with a degree in economics, he played semi-professional football for the Cannes Iron Mask in Cannes, France in 2003. He played professional basketball for Club Falcon in Copenhagen, Denmark for the 2003–04 season.

== Coaching career ==
Hansen was an assistant coach under his father at Palo Alto High for four seasons (2004–07), working primarily with tight ends and defensive ends. He also served as the team's defensive coordinator during the 2006 and 2007 seasons.

in 2008, Hansen was a strength-and-conditioning intern for the Stanford Cardinal football team. He was promoted to defensive assistant at Stanford in 2009. When Stanford defensive coordinator Vic Fangio moved to the San Francisco 49ers with head coach Jim Harbaugh, Hansen was hired as defensive assistant/quality control coach for the 49ers. Hansen worked with film breakdown, scouting reports and practice preparation.

In January 2014, Hansen returned to Stanford as inside linebackers coach.

On January 21, 2020, Hansen was announced as the new defensive coordinator on Marcus Arroyo's inaugural staff at UNLV. Following two seasons at UNLV, Hansen was hired as the linebackers coach for the Denver Broncos in 2022. Hansen was not retained by the Broncos for 2023 after Sean Payton was hired as head coach.

On February 8, 2023, the Carolina Panthers hired Hansen as their linebackers coach.
