= Ross Bowers (American football) =

American football player (born 1996)

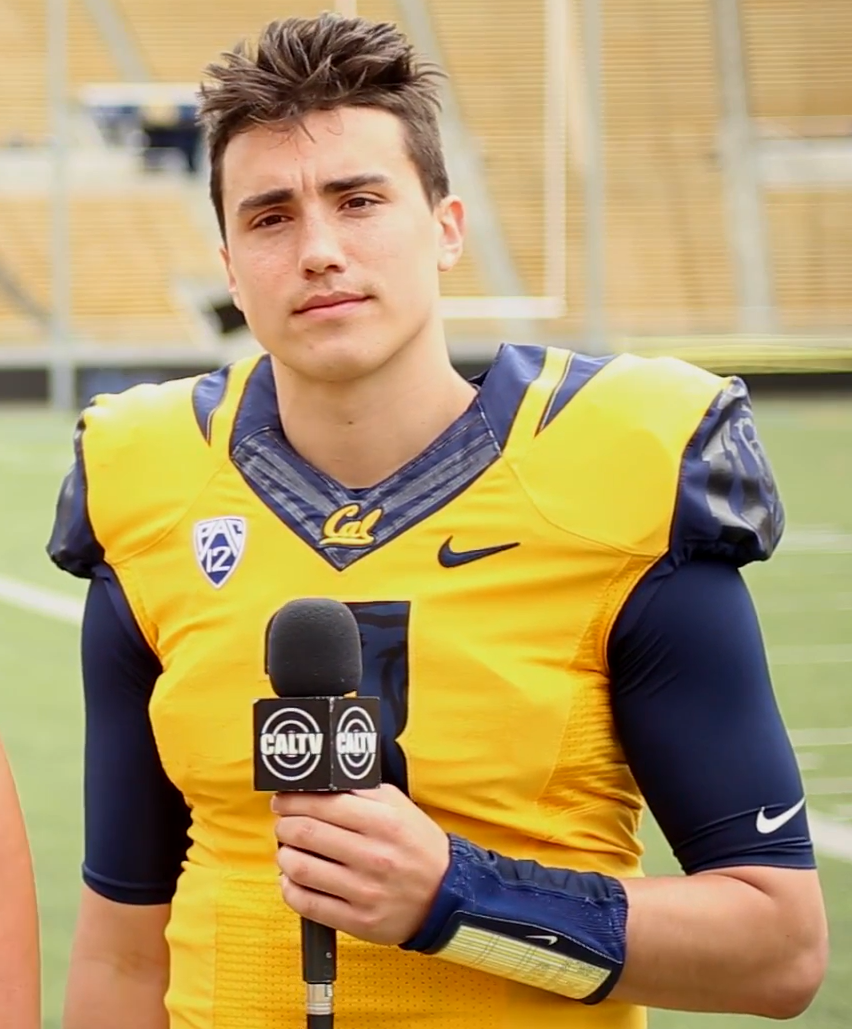
- Bowers with Cal in 2017

Profile
- Position: Quarterback

Personal information
- Born: November 19, 1996 (age 29); Bothell, Washington, U.S.
- Listed height: 6 ft 2 in (1.88 m)
- Listed weight: 200 lb (91 kg)

Career information
- High school: Bothell
- College: California (2015–2018); Northern Illinois (2019–2020)

Ross Buchanan Bowers (born November 19, 1996) is an American former football quarterback.

== Early life ==
Bowers attended Bothell High School in Bothell, Washington. His father, John, was an assistant coach for James Madison football between 2013 and 2016. His mother, Joanne, spent ten seasons as the head women's gymnastics coach for the Washington Huskies between 2006 and 2016.

In 2014, as a senior, he led Bothell High School to a 24–14 win in the 4A State Championship. He scored a touchdown on a flip during this game.

== College career ==
In 2014, Bowers committed to the University of California, Berkeley. He redshirted his first year at California in 2015 and spent 2016 as a backup to Davis Webb.

=== 2017 season ===
In 2017, Bowers took over as Cal's starting quarterback. In his first career start, he completed 24 of 38 passes for 363 yards and four touchdowns against UNC.

On October 13, 2017, Bowers led the Golden Bears to a 37–3 win against #8 Washington State. He executed a flip, similar to the one in 2014, to put the Bears up 27–3 in the fourth quarter. This was Cal's first win against a top-ten team since 2003.

The Bears finished the 2017 season with a 5–7 record. Bowers finished the season with 18 touchdowns, 12 interceptions, and over 3,000 yards passing. He is the seventh player in Cal history to throw for over 3,000 yards in a season.

=== 2018 season ===
Bowers injured his thumb in spring training camp prior to the start of the 2018 season. He started in a season-opening win against North Carolina but did not play in the second half or in subsequent games. Bowers announced his intention to leave the Bears' program on December 19, 2018.

On March 29, 2019, Bowers's father announced via Twitter his son's transfer to Northern Illinois University.

=== Statistics ===
Season	Passing								Rushing			
Season	Cmp	Att	Pct	Yds	Avg/P	Avg/G	TD	Int	Att	Yds	Avg	TD
2017 – Cal	272	461	59.0	3,039	6.6	6.6	18	12	60	−142	−2.4	3
2018 – Cal	8	17	47.1	56	3.3	3.3	0	0	3	−7	−2.3	0
2019 – Northern Illinois	166	287	57.8	2130	7.4	7.4	7	8	34	−111	−3.3	1
2020 – Northern Illinois	123	212	58.0	1365	6.4	6.4	10	2	20	−59	−3.0	0
Totals	569	977	58.2	6590	6.7	6.7	35	22	118	−317	−2.7	4
