= Bryce Love =

American football player (born 1997)

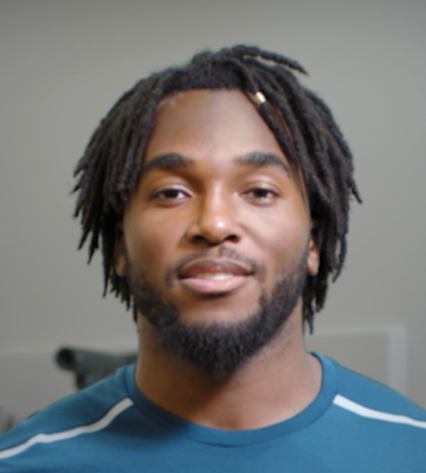
- Love in 2018

No. 23
- Position: Running back

Personal information
- Born: July 8, 1997 (age 29); Raleigh, North Carolina, U.S.
- Listed height: 5 ft 9 in (1.75 m)
- Listed weight: 205 lb (93 kg)

Career information
- High school: Wake Forest (Wake Forest, North Carolina)
- College: Stanford (2015–2018)
- NFL draft: 2019: 4th round, 112th overall pick

Career history
- Washington Redskins / Football Team (2019–2020)

Awards and highlights
- Lombardi Award (2017); Doak Walker Award (2017); Jim Brown Trophy (2017); Unanimous All-American (2017); Pac-12 Offensive Player of the Year (2017); First-team All-Pac-12 (2017)
- Stats at Pro Football Reference

Jonathan Bryce Love (born July 8, 1997) is an American former football running back. He played college football for the Stanford Cardinal and was selected by the Washington Redskins in the fourth round of the 2019 NFL draft, although he never played in a game with them due to a lingering issue from a knee injury he suffered at Stanford. In his youth, he was also a sprinter specializing in the 200 meters and 400 meters, earning USA Track & Field Youth Athlete of the Year honors in 2009.

== Early life ==
A native of Wake Forest, North Carolina, Love attended Wake Forest High School. In addition to track, he competed in football and drew comparisons to Keith Marshall. At the combine of the 2013 U.S. Army All-American Bowl in San Antonio, Texas, Love ran an electronically timed 4.4 seconds in the 40-yard dash.

A track athlete from an early age, Love attended the 2009 USA Track & Field (USATF) National Junior Olympic Track & Field Championships, setting national record times of 11.64 in the 100m, 23.37 in the 200m and 50.75 in the 400m dash. It was the first time a boy from the midget age group (11–12 years old) has set three national records in one year. Love was named USATF Youth Athlete of the Year 2009. Soon after, Love set new records in the 13–14 yrs group at a meet in Hoschton, Georgia. He ran 10.73 in the 100 and 21.83 in the 200 on consecutive days.

As a football player, he was rated as a 4-star recruit by ESPN and the No. 18 running back prospect of the class of 2015. He committed to Stanford over offers from Clemson, East Carolina, Florida, Georgia, North Carolina, South Carolina, Tennessee, Virginia Tech, and Wisconsin, among others.

== College career ==
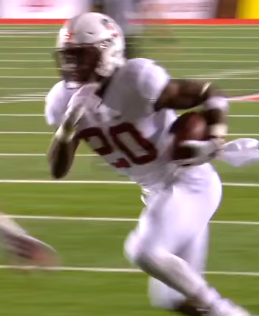
Love with the Stanford Cardinal in 2018

=== 2015–2016 ===
In the 2015 and 2016 seasons, Love backed up Christian McCaffrey, a first-round selection in the 2017 NFL draft. Love accumulated 1,009 rushing yards in these two seasons.

=== 2017 ===
Love had a break-out season in 2017 with 2,118 rushing yards. Love was second in the nation in rushing yards and in rushing yards per game. Love reached the 1,000-yard rushing mark in just the fifth game of the season. He had back-to-back games with over 250 rushing yards, making him only the second Pac-12 Conference player to accomplish this (along with Reggie Bush). He ran for a school-record 301 yards in a game. Love ran for at least 100 yards in twelve of his thirteen games, leading all running backs in the nation.

Love won the Doak Walker Award as the nation's best running back. He won the Lombardi Award for 2017. He was a unanimous first-team All-American. The Pac-12 named Love its Offensive Player of the Year. Love also was named to the All-Pac-12 First-team. Like McCaffrey in 2015, Love was the runner-up for the 2017 Heisman Trophy.

=== 2018 ===
In his senior season, Love was one of the team captains. He was put on several preseason All-American lists as well as preseason award watch lists. He missed some time due to an ACL injury, but managed to finish the year with 739 rushing yards and six rushing touchdowns. At the end of the season, he earned Pac-12 honorable mention. Love graduated from Stanford with a degree in human biology in 2019.

=== College statistics ===
Season	GP	Rushing				Receiving			
Season	GP	Att	Yds	Avg	TD	Rec	Yds	Avg	TD
2015	14	29	225	7.8	2	15	250	16.7	1
2016	12	111	783	7.1	3	8	83	10.4	1
2017	13	263	2,118	8.1	19	6	33	5.5	0
2018	10	166	739	4.5	6	20	99	5.0	0
Career	49	569	3,865	6.8	30	49	465	9.5	2

== Professional career ==
Pre-draft measurables
Height	Weight	Arm length	Hand span	Bench press
5 ft 8 7/8 in (1.75 m)	200 lb (91 kg)	29 3/8 in (0.75 m)	9 1/8 in (0.23 m)	18 reps
All values from NFL Combine

Prior to the draft, Love suffered a torn anterior cruciate ligament in his final college game which led to a concern among teams. He ultimately was drafted by the Washington Redskins in the fourth round, 112th overall, of the 2019 NFL draft. He signed his rookie contract with the team on May 9, 2019. He was placed on the non-football injury list before the start of the season on August 31, 2019. He was active for a few games in 2020 before being placed on injured reserve (IR) on October 2. He was designated to return from IR in November and practiced with the team, but was not elevated to the active roster in time and remained on IR. Love was eventually waived by the team on April 19, 2021, having never played in a game with them.

== After football ==
Love remained in the Washington area and is an angel investor in technology. He has also expressed interest in going to medical school to be a pediatrician. In 2025, Love joined the ACC Network as an on-air analyst for their college football coverage.

Awards
Preceded by Jordan Hasay	USA Track & Field Youth Athlete of the Year; 2009	Succeeded by Trevor Barron
