= Kaden Smith =

American football player (born 1997)

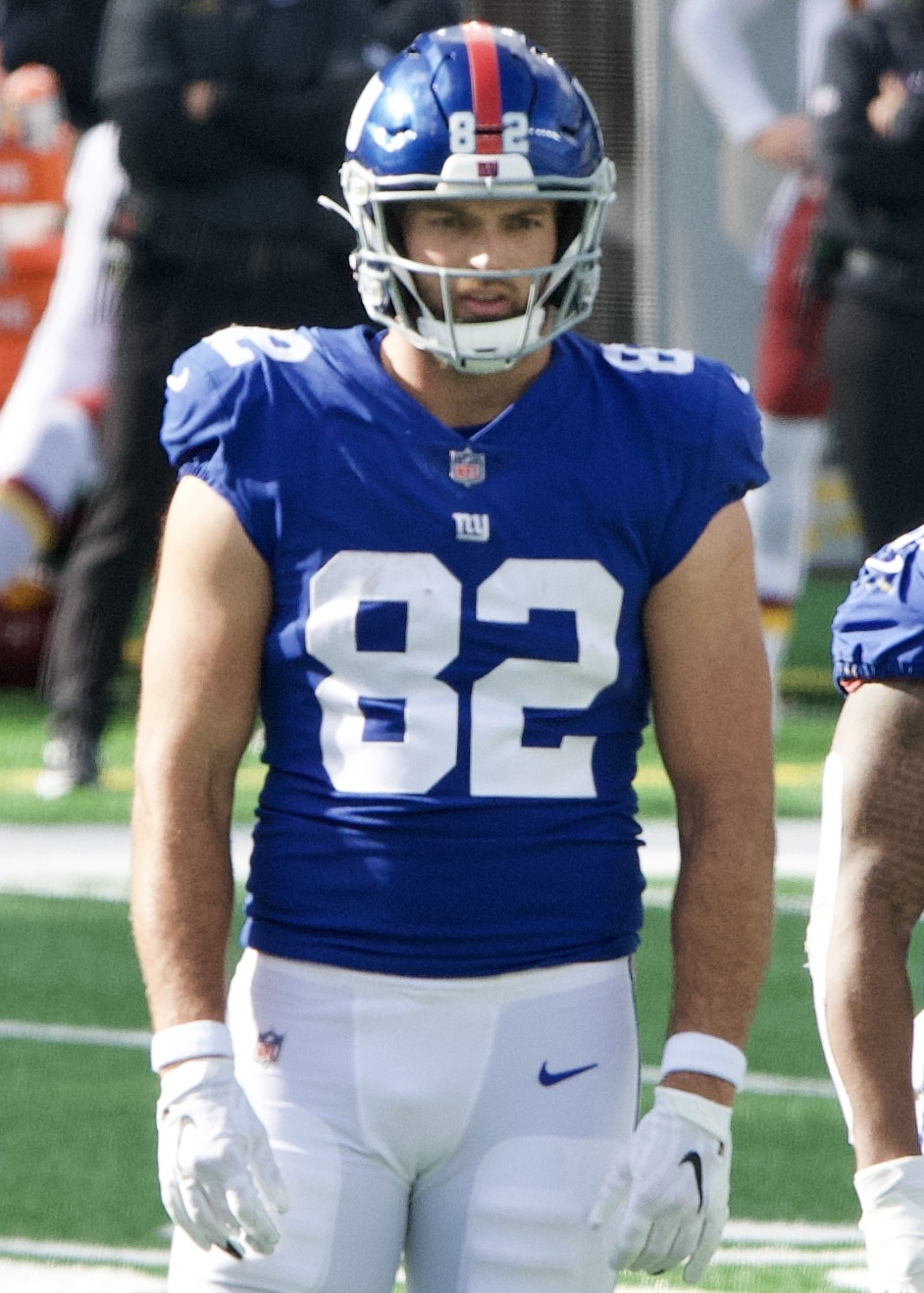
- Smith with the New York Giants in 2020

Profile
- Position: Tight end

Personal information
- Born: April 24, 1997 (age 29); Atlanta, Georgia, U.S.
- Listed height: 6 ft 5 in (1.96 m)
- Listed weight: 249 lb (113 kg)

Career information
- High school: Marcus (Flower Mound, Texas)
- College: Stanford (2016–2018)
- NFL draft: 2019: 6th round, 176th overall pick

Career history
- San Francisco 49ers (2019); New York Giants (2019–2021); Indianapolis Colts (2023)*; Washington Commanders (2023); DC Defenders (2024)
- * Offseason or practice squad member only

Awards and highlights
- Second-team All-Pac-12 (2018)

Career NFL statistics
- Receptions: 52
- Receiving yards: 413
- Receiving touchdowns: 3
- Stats at Pro Football Reference

Kaden Nelson Smith (born April 24, 1997) is an American professional football tight end. He played college football for the Stanford Cardinal. He was selected by the San Francisco 49ers in the sixth round of the 2019 NFL draft and has also been a member of the New York Giants and Indianapolis Colts.

== Early life ==
Smith attended Edward S. Marcus High School in Flower Mound, Texas. During his career he had 144 career receptions for 2,260 yards. He committed to Stanford University to play college football.

== College career ==
After redshirting his first year at Stanford in 2016, Smith played had 23 receptions for 414 yards and five touchdowns in 2017. In 2018, he was a finalist for the John Mackey Award. On January 1, 2019, Smith announced that he would forgo his senior season and declare for the 2019 NFL draft.

== Professional career ==
Pre-draft measurables
| Height | Weight | Arm length | Hand span | 40-yard dash | 10-yard split | 20-yard split | 20-yard shuttle | Three-cone drill | Vertical jump | Broad jump | Bench press |
|---|---|---|---|---|---|---|---|---|---|---|---|
| 6 ft 5 in (1.96 m) | 255 lb (116 kg) | 32 1/4 in (0.82 m) | 9 5/8 in (0.24 m) | 4.92 s | 1.68 s | 2.86 s | 4.47 s | 7.08 s | 33.5 in (0.85 m) | 9 ft 0 in (2.74 m) | 15 reps |

=== San Francisco 49ers ===
Smith was selected by the San Francisco 49ers in the sixth round, 176th overall, of the 2019 NFL draft. He was waived on September 14, 2019.

=== New York Giants ===
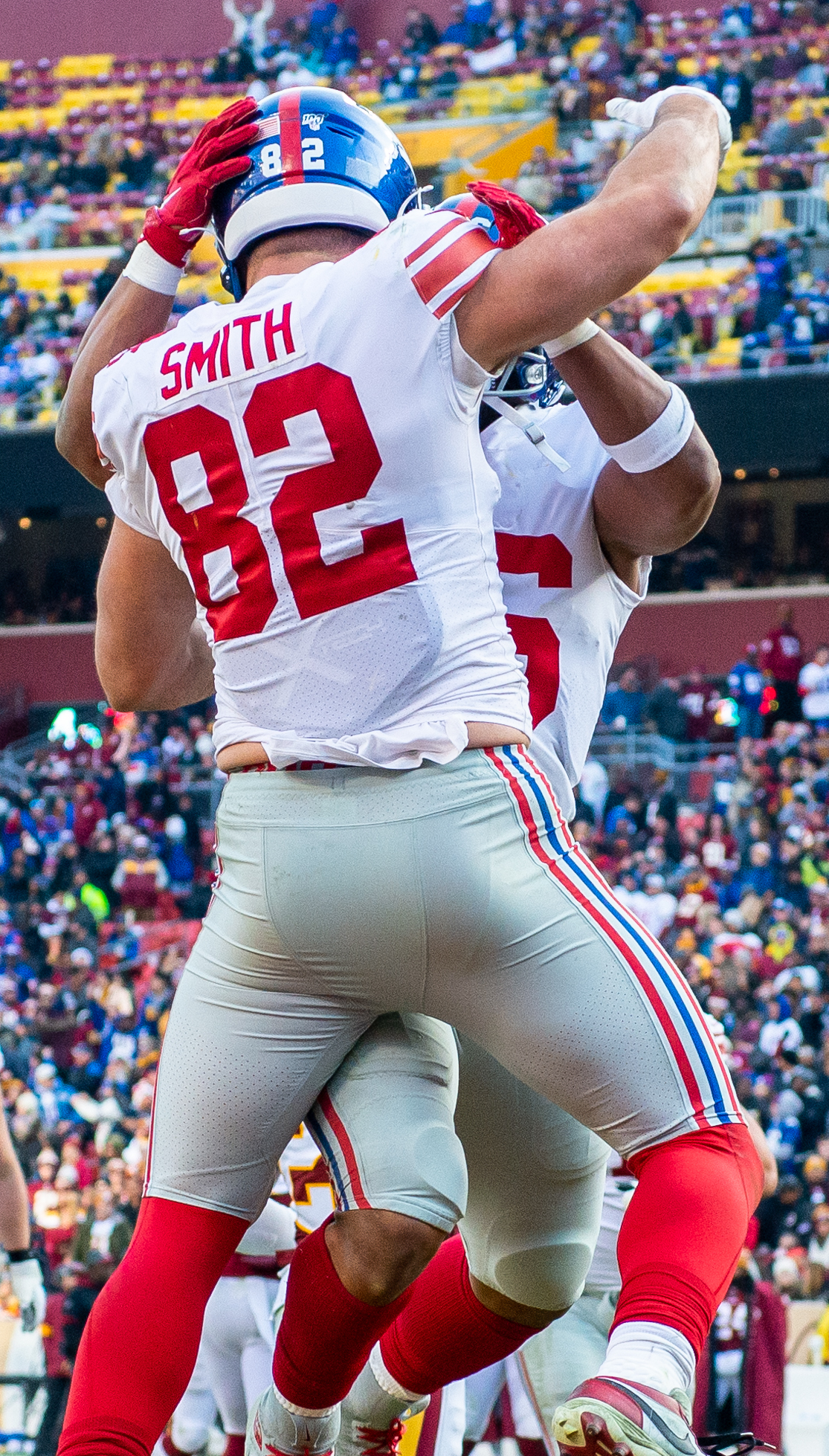
Smith with the Giants in 2019.

On September 16, 2019, Smith was claimed off of waivers by the New York Giants. During the Week 12 matchup against the Chicago Bears, Smith made his first-career start in his fourth game and recorded his first touchdown in the NFL in the 19–14 loss. In week 16 against the Washington Redskins, Smith caught 6 passes for 35 yards and 2 touchdowns, including the game winner in overtime, during the 41–35 win.

Smith was placed on the reserve/COVID-19 list by the team on November 20, 2020, and activated on December 1.

On December 3, 2021, Smith was placed on injured reserve.

On March 11, 2022, Smith was waived after failing a physical.

=== Indianapolis Colts ===
On May 24, 2023, Smith signed with the Indianapolis Colts. He was waived by Indianapolis on August 1.

=== Washington Commanders ===
On August 13, 2023, Smith signed with the Washington Commanders. On August 29, he was placed on injured reserve. He was released on October 16.

=== DC Defenders ===
On March 1, 2024, Smith signed with the DC Defenders of the United Football League (UFL).

=== NFL career statistics ===
| Year | Team | Games | | Receiving | | | | | Fumbles | |
| YR | TM | GP | GS | Rec | Yds | Avg | Lng | TD | Fum | Lost |
|---|---|---|---|---|---|---|---|---|---|---|
| 2019 | NYG | 9 | 6 | 31 | 268 | 8.6 | 32 | 3 | 2 | 0 |
| 2020 | NYG | 15 | 12 | 18 | 112 | 6.2 | 16 | 0 | 1 | 0 |
| 2021 | NYG | 9 | 4 | 3 | 33 | 11 | 21 | 0 | 0 | 0 |
| Total | | 33 | 22 | 52 | 413 | 8.6 | 32 | 3 | 3 | 0 |
