= Chase McGrath =

American football player (born 1998)

Profile
- Position: Placekicker

Personal information
- Born: September 13, 1998 (age 28); Long Beach, California, U.S.
- Listed height: 6 ft 0 in (1.83 m)
- Listed weight: 198 lb (90 kg)

Career information
- High school: Mater Dei (Santa Ana, California)
- College: USC (2017–2020); Tennessee (2021–2022)
- NFL draft: 2023: undrafted

Chase Greer McGrath (born September 13, 1998) is an American football placekicker. He played college football at USC and Tennessee.

McGrath is known for his game-winning field goals against Texas in 2017 and Alabama in 2022, both of which became defining moments in USC and Tennessee football history.

== Early life ==
McGrath was born in Long Beach, California. McGrath attended Mater Dei High School in Santa Ana, California, where he played American football.

During his high school career, he received several accolades, including All-Trinity League Kicker of the Year, First Team All-CIF, and First Team All-Orange County honors. A five-star recruit, McGrath was ranked among the top 15 kickers in the nation in the class of 2017. He committed to play college football at the University of Southern California (USC) as a walk-on.

== College career ==
McGrath attended the University of Southern California from 2017 to 2020 and the University of Tennessee in 2021 and 2022.

In 2017, McGrath won USC's starting placekicker position as a true freshman walk-on, beating out a scholarship player for the job. He made 12 of 17 field goals (70.5%) and 58 of 59 extra points (98.3%). He made his first two career field goals against Texas, converting a 31-yard attempt as time expired to send the game to overtime and a 43-yard attempt in double overtime to secure the victory. The game marked USC's first sellout at the Los Angeles Memorial Coliseum since 2013 and was the first meeting between USC and Texas since their 2006 Rose Bowl matchup. USC fans voted McGrath’s two field goals as one of the most memorable moments in USC athletics history. He received USC’s Joe Collins Walk-On Award and was placed on scholarship.

In 2018, for his sophomore season, McGrath made 6 of 8 field goal attempts (75%) and made 6 of 6 extra points (100%) before tearing his ligament in his right knee while attempting to chase down a defender after a blocked kick against Texas. In the first game of the season against UNLV, McGrath went 5-for-5 on field goals, a USC single-game record. He was named PAC-12 Special Teams Player of the Week and Lou Groza Kicker of the Week.

In 2019, for his redshirt sophomore season, McGrath made 14 of 17 field goals (82.3%) and made 54 of 54 extra point attempts (100%). He was named PAC-12 All-Conference Kicker, earned USC's Mario Danelo Special Teams Player of the Year award, and was nominated for the Burlsworth Trophy, recognizing the top college football player who started their career as a walk-on.

In 2020, for his redshirt junior season, McGrath did not see the field due to the shortened season.

In 2021, for his redshirt senior season, McGrath transferred to Tennessee as Josh Heupel’s first official commitment as head coach and was named to the Lou Groza award watch list. He made 12 of 16 field goal attempts (75%) and made 66 of 66 extra points (100%), setting a Tennessee single-season record for extra points made.

In 2022, for his sixth year redshirt senior season, McGrath made 16 of 20 field goal attempts (80%) and made 70 of 72 extra point attempts (97.2%), surpassing his own Tennessee record from the previous year. On October 15, he made a partially deflected 40-yard game-winning field goal to give Tennessee a 52–49 victory over Alabama, ending the Crimson Tide’s 15-year win streak in the rivalry. The game is widely regarded as one of the greatest in college football history. The victory sparked a historic celebration, with fans storming the field and tearing down the goalposts at Neyland Stadium. Following the game-winning kick, a Tennessee fan named their child after McGrath in honor of the moment.

McGrath finished his college career in the top 25 for points scored in NCAA football history, making 60 of his 78 field goal attempts (76.9%) and converting 254 of 257 extra points (98.8%) for a total of 434 points.

=== College statistics ===
Legend
**Bold**	Career high

Season	Kicking							
Season	FGM	FGA	FG%	Long	XPM	XPA	XP%	PTS
2017	12	17	70.5%	51	58	59	98.3%	94
2018	6	8	75%	47	6	6	**100%**	24
2019	14	17	**82.3%**	**52**	54	54	**100%**	96
2020	0	0	0%	0	0	0	0%	0
2021	12	16	75%	48	66	66	**100%**	102
2022	**16**	**20**	80%	51	**70**	**72**	97.2%	**118**
Career	60	78	76.9%	52	254	257	98.8%	434
