= 2017 Washington Huskies football team =

American college football season

2017 Washington Huskies football

Pac-12 North Division co-champion

Fiesta Bowl, L 28–35 vs. Penn State
- Conference: Pac-12 Conference
- North Division

Ranking
- Coaches: No. 15
- AP: No. 16
- Record: 10–3 (7–2 Pac-12)
- Head coach: Chris Petersen (4th season)
- Offensive coordinator: Jonathan Smith (4th season)
- Co-offensive coordinator: Matt Lubick (1st season)
- Offensive scheme: Spread
- Defensive coordinator: Pete Kwiatkowski (4th season)
- Co-defensive coordinator: Jimmy Lake (2nd season)
- Base defense: 3–4
- MVPs: Myles Gaskin (O); Vita Vea (D); Dante Pettis (ST)
- Captains: Keishawn Bierria; Coleman Shelton
- Home stadium: Alaska Airlines Field at Husky Stadium

2017 Pac-12 Conference football standings
	Conf.			Overall
Team	W		L	W		L
North Division
No. 20 Stanford xy	7	–	2	9	–	5
No. 16 Washington x	7	–	2	10	–	3
Washington State	6	–	3	9	–	4
Oregon	4	–	5	7	–	6
California	2	–	7	5	–	7
Oregon State	0	–	9	1	–	11
South Division
No. 12 USC xy$	8	–	1	11	–	3
Arizona State	6	–	3	7	–	6
Arizona	5	–	4	7	–	6
UCLA	4	–	5	6	–	7
Utah	3	–	6	7	–	6
Colorado	2	–	7	5	–	7
Championship: USC 31, Stanford 28
$ – Conference champion; x – Division champion/co-champions; y – Championship game participant; Rankings from AP Poll

The 2017 Washington Huskies football team represented the University of Washington during the 2017 NCAA Division I FBS football season. Chris Petersen led the team in his fourth season as head coach. Washington competed as a member of the North Division of the Pac-12 Conference and played their home games on campus at Husky Stadium in Seattle. They finished the season 10–3, 7–2 in Pac-12 play to win a share of the North Division title with Stanford. Due to their head-to-head loss to Stanford, they did not represent the North Division in the Pac-12 Championship Game. They were invited to the Fiesta Bowl where they lost to Penn State.

== Personnel ==
=== Coaching staff ===
Name	Position	Washington Years	Alma mater
Chris Petersen	Head coach	4th	UC Davis (1988)
Pete Kwiatkowski	Defensive coordinator	4th	Boise State (1990)
Jimmy Lake	Co-defensive coordinator / defensive backs	4th	Eastern Washington (2000)
Jonathan Smith	Offensive coordinator / quarterbacks	4th	Oregon State (2001)
Matt Lubick	Co-offensive coordinator / Receivers	1st	Western Montana (1994)
Bob Gregory	Assistant head coach / Linebackers / special teams	4th	Washington State (1987)
Keith Bhonapha	Running backs / recruiting coordinator	4th	Hawaii (2003)
Scott Huff	Offensive line / Run Game Coordinator	1st	Boise State (2002)
Ikaika Malloe	Defensive line	2nd	Washington (1997)
Jordan Paopao	Tight ends	7th	San Diego (2006)

=== Roster ===
2017 Washington Huskies football roster
Quarterback: 3 Jake Browning – junior (6'2, 210); 11 K. J. Carta-Samuels – (redshirt) junior (6'2, 221); 13 Jake Haener – freshman (6'0, 193); 17 Daniel Bridge-Gadd – (redshirt) freshman (6'2, 211); Tailback: 9 Myles Gaskin – junior (5'10, 191); 22 Lavon Coleman – (redshirt) senior (5'11, 235); 24 Kamari Pleasant – (redshirt) freshman (6'0, 194); 25 Sean McGrew – (redshirt) freshman (5'7, 169); 26 Salvon Ahmed – freshman (5'11, 189); 34 Nate Ihlenfeldt – freshman (5'10, 188); 40 Ralph Kinne – (redshirt) senior (5'10, 221); 48 Paul Wells – sophomore (5'9, 177); Fullback: 45 Mike Petroff – (redshirt) freshman (6'0, 228); Wide receiver: 5 Andre Baccellia – (redshirt) sophomore (5'10, 171); 6 Chico McClatcher – junior (5'7, 181); 8 Dante Pettis – senior (6'1, 195); 12 Aaron Fuller – sophomore (5'10, 187); 15 Alex Cook – freshman (6'1, 185); 18 K.J. Young – (redshirt) senior (6'0, 202); 20 Ty Jones – freshman (6'4, 209); 21 Quinten Pounds – (redshirt) sophomore (5'11, 177); 28 Terrell Bynum – freshman (6'1, 184); 29 Josh Rasmussen – (redshirt) sophomore (5'11, 182); 47 Ian Biddle – junior (6'0, 186); 80 Max Richmond – (redshirt) junior (5'9, 183); 81 Brayden Lenius – (redshirt) junior (6'5, 230); 82 Jordan Chin – (redshirt) freshman (6'0, 171); 87 Forrest Dunivin – (redshirt) senior (6'4, 200); 89 John Gardner – (redshirt) junior (6'3, 196); Tight end: 19 Hunter Bryant – freshman (6'2, 239); 23 Deshon Williams – junior (6'2, 225); 83 Cade Otton – freshman (6'4, 230); 84 Michael Neal – (redshirt) sophomore (6'4, 240); 85 David Ajamu – (redshirt) senior (6'5, 245); 86 Jacob Kizer – freshman (6'4, 244); 88 Drew Sample – (redshirt) junior (6'5, 259); 94 Derek Hunter – (redshirt) senior (6'2, 233); 98 Will Dissly – senior (6'4, 267)	Offensive line: 56 Nick Harris – sophomore (6'1, 293); 58 Kaleb McGary – (redshirt) junior (6'7, 318); 59 Henry Roberts – (redshirt) sophomore (6'6, 300); 63 Cole Norgaard – freshman (6'4, 277); 64 A.J. Kneip – (redshirt) freshman (6'2, 289); 65 Jaxson Kirkland – freshman (6'6, 312); 66 Henry Bainivalu – freshman (6'5, 298); 67 Chase Skuza – freshman (6'5, 312); 70 Jared Hilbers – (redshirt) sophomore (6'7, 313); 71 Matt James – (redshirt) junior (6'5, 276); 72 Trey Adams – junior (6'8, 327); 73 Andrew Kirkland – (redshirt) senior (6'4, 321); 74 John Turner – (redshirt) junior (6'4, 301); 75 Jesse Sosebee – (redshirt) junior (6'5, 312); 76 Luke Wattenberg – (redshirt) freshman (6'4, 295); 77 Devin Burleson – (redshirt) sophomore (6'8, 327); 79 Coleman Shelton – (redshirt) senior (6'4, 299); Defensive line: 50 Vita Vea – (redshirt) junior (6'5, 340); 56 Jared Pulu – (redshirt) sophomore (6'4, 278); 57 John Clark – (redshirt) sophomore (6'4, 279); 90 Josiah Bronson – sophomore (6'5, 265); 91 Ricky McCoy – (redshirt) sophomore (6'2, 292); 92 Jaylen Johnson – (redshirt) junior (6'3, 298); 93 Jarryn Bush – freshman (6'2, 240); 95 Levi Onwuzurike – (redshirt) freshman (6'3, 290); 96 Shane Bowman – (redshirt) junior (6'4, 303); 97 Jason Scrempos – (redshirt) sophomore (6'6, 283); 99 Greg Gaines – (redshirt) junior (6'2, 322); Long snapper: 49 A.J. Carty – (redshirt) sophomore (6'2, 243); 78 Luke Lane – (redshirt) freshman (5'11, 215); Placekicker: 42 Van Soderberg – (redshirt) freshman (6'0, 197); 43 Tristan Vizcaino – senior (6'2, 202); 47 Peyton Henry – freshman (5'10, 189); 81 Sebastian Valerio – (redshirt) sophomore (5'9, 179); Punter: 32 Joel Whitford – (redshirt) sophomore (6'3, 224); 46 Race Porter – (redshirt) freshman (6'1, 178)	Inside Linebacker: 7 Keishawn Bierria – (redshirt) senior (6'1, 223); 13 Brandon Wellington – sophomore (5'11, 223); 15 D.J. Beavers – (redshirt) sophomore (6'0, 230); 17 Tevis Bartlett – junior (6'2, 234); 25 Ben Burr-Kirven – junior (6'0, 222); 30 Kyler Manu – (redshirt) sophomore (6'1, 240); 34 Sean Constantine – (redshirt) senior (6'2, 231); 36 Azeem Victor – (redshirt) senior (6'3, 231); 40 Milo Eifler – (redshirt) freshman (6'1, 223); 53 Jake Wambaugh – (redshirt) junior (6'1, 221); 54 Matt Preston – (redshirt) junior (6'2, 237); Outside Linebacker: 8 Benning Potoa'e – (redshirt) sophomore (6'3, 278); 16 Amandre Williams – (redshirt) freshman (6'2, 225); 29 Connor O'Brien – (redshirt) senior (6'3, 224); 37 Bryce Sterk – (redshirt) sophomore (6'4, 246); 41 Myles Rice – (redshirt) freshman (6'3, 240); 45 Jusstis Warren – (redshirt) sophomore (6'2, 252); 51 Joe Tryon-Shoyinka – freshman (6'4, 251); 52 Ariel Ngata – freshman (6'2, 208); 55 Ryan Bowman – (redshirt) freshman (6'0, 262); Defensive back: 1 Byron Murphy – (redshirt) freshman (5'11, 175); 3 Elijah Molden – freshman (5'10, 186); 4 Austin Joyner – (redshirt) sophomore (5'10, 182); 5 Myles Bryant – sophomore (5'8, 180); 10 Jomon Dotson – (redshirt) junior (5'10, 181); 11 Brandon McKinney – freshman (6'0, 191); 12 Kentrell Love – (redshirt) freshman (6'1, 182); 14 JoJo McIntosh – (redshirt) junior (6'1, 219); 18 Isaiah Gilchrist – (redshirt) freshman (5'10, 203); 21 Taylor Rapp – sophomore (6'0, 212); 23 Jordan Miller – junior (6'1, 184); 24 Ezekiel Turner – senior (6'2, 214); 27 Keith Taylor – freshman (6'2, 186); 35 Mason Stone – (redshirt) junior (6'0, 185); 38 Zechariah Brown – freshman (5'10, 184); 39 Sean Vergara – (redshirt) junior (6'2, 183)

== Recruiting ==
=== Position key ===
Back	B	Center	C	Cornerback	CB	Defensive back	DB
Defensive end	DE	Defensive lineman	DL	Defensive tackle	DT	End	E
Fullback	FB	Guard	G	Halfback	HB	Kicker	K
Kickoff returner	KR	Offensive tackle	OT	Offensive lineman	OL	Linebacker	LB
Long snapper	LS	Punter	P	Punt returner	PR	Quarterback	QB
Running back	RB	Safety	S	Tight end	TE	Wide receiver	WR

=== Recruits ===
The Huskies signed a total of 18 commits.

College recruiting information (2017)
Name	Hometown	School	Height	Weight	Commit date
Keith Taylor; CB	Anaheim, California	Servite HS	6 ft 2 in (1.88 m)	180 lb (82 kg)	Dec 24, 2015
Keith Taylor; CB	Recruit ratings: Scout: Rivals: 247Sports: ESPN:				
Terrell Bynum; WR	Bellflower, California	St. John Bosco HS	6 ft 1 in (1.85 m)	175 lb (79 kg)	Apr 13, 2016
Terrell Bynum; WR	Recruit ratings: Scout: Rivals: 247Sports: ESPN:				
Hunter Bryant; TE	Bellevue, Washington	Eastside Catholic HS	6 ft 3 in (1.91 m)	238 lb (108 kg)	Apr 23, 2016
Hunter Bryant; TE	Recruit ratings: Scout: Rivals: 247Sports: ESPN:				
Alex Cook; WR	Sacramento, California	Sheldon HS	6 ft 2 in (1.88 m)	170 lb (77 kg)	Apr 23, 2016
Alex Cook; WR	Recruit ratings: Scout: Rivals: 247Sports: ESPN:				
Ty Jones; WR	Provo, Utah	Provo HS	6 ft 4 in (1.93 m)	195 lb (88 kg)	May 17, 2016
Ty Jones; WR	Recruit ratings: Scout: Rivals: 247Sports: ESPN:				
Ariel Ngata; LB	Folsom, California	Folsom HS	6 ft 4 in (1.93 m)	210 lb (95 kg)	May 26, 2016
Ariel Ngata; LB	Recruit ratings: Scout: Rivals: 247Sports: ESPN:				
Joel Whitford; P	Warragul, Victoria, Australia	Santa Barbara City College	6 ft 4 in (1.93 m)	215 lb (98 kg)	Jun 6, 2016
Joel Whitford; P	Recruit ratings: Scout: Rivals: 247Sports: ESPN:				
Jake Haener; QB	Danville, California	Monte Vista HS	6 ft 1 in (1.85 m)	188 lb (85 kg)	Jun 18, 2016
Jake Haener; QB	Recruit ratings: Scout: Rivals: 247Sports: ESPN:				
Brandon McKinney; S	Orange, California	Orange Lutheran HS	6 ft 2 in (1.88 m)	190 lb (86 kg)	Jul 16, 2016
Brandon McKinney; S	Recruit ratings: Scout: Rivals: 247Sports: ESPN:				
Cade Otton; TE	Olympia, Washington	Tumwater HS	6 ft 5 in (1.96 m)	223 lb (101 kg)	Aug 12, 2016
Cade Otton; TE	Recruit ratings: Scout: Rivals: 247Sports: ESPN:				
Salvon Ahmed; RB	Kirkland, Washington	Juanita HS	6 ft 0 in (1.83 m)	185 lb (84 kg)	Sep 23, 2016
Salvon Ahmed; RB	Recruit ratings: Scout: Rivals: 247Sports: ESPN:				
Elijah Molden; CB	West Linn, Oregon	West Linn HS	5 ft 11 in (1.80 m)	185 lb (84 kg)	Nov 12, 2016
Elijah Molden; CB	Recruit ratings: Scout: Rivals: 247Sports: ESPN:				
Henry Bainivalu; OT	Sammamish, Washington	Skyline HS	6 ft 6 in (1.98 m)	290 lb (130 kg)	Nov 13, 2016
Henry Bainivalu; OT	Recruit ratings: Scout: Rivals: 247Sports: ESPN:				
Joe Tryon-Shoyinka; DE	Renton, Washington	Hazen HS	6 ft 5 in (1.96 m)	230 lb (100 kg)	Jan 13, 2017
Joe Tryon-Shoyinka; DE	Recruit ratings: Scout: Rivals: 247Sports: ESPN:				
Cole Norgaard; OT	Stockton, California	St. Mary's HS	6 ft 5 in (1.96 m)	271 lb (123 kg)	Jan 15, 2017
Cole Norgaard; OT	Recruit ratings: Scout: Rivals: 247Sports: ESPN:				
Ali Gaye; DE	Edmonds, Washington	Edmonds Woodway HS	6 ft 6 in (1.98 m)	260 lb (120 kg)	Jan 23, 2017
Ali Gaye; DE	Recruit ratings: Scout: Rivals: 247Sports: ESPN:				
Jaxson Kirkland; OT	Portland, Oregon	Jesuit HS	6 ft 7 in (2.01 m)	305 lb (138 kg)	Jan 30, 2017
Jaxson Kirkland; OT	Recruit ratings: Scout: Rivals: 247Sports: ESPN:				
Jordan Lolohea; DE	Salt Lake City, Utah	East HS	6 ft 3 in (1.91 m)	240 lb (110 kg)	Feb 1, 2017
Jordan Lolohea; DE	Recruit ratings: Scout: Rivals: 247Sports: ESPN:				
Overall recruit ranking:
Note: In many cases, Scout, Rivals, 247Sports, On3, and ESPN may conflict in their listings of height and weight.; In these cases, the average was taken. ESPN grades are on a 100-point scale.; Sources: "Washington Football Commitments". Rivals.; "2017 Washington Football Commits". Scout.; "ESPN". ESPN.; "Scout.com Team Recruiting Rankings". Scout.; "2017 Team Ranking". Rivals.com.

== Schedule ==
Date	Time	Opponent	Rank	Site	TV	Result	Attendance
September 1	5:00 p.m.	at Rutgers*	No. 8	High Point Solutions Stadium; Piscataway, NJ	FS1	W 30–14	46,093
September 9	5:00 p.m.	Montana*	No. 7	Husky Stadium; Seattle, WA	P12N	W 63–7	68,491
September 16	6:30 p.m.	Fresno State*	No. 6	Husky Stadium; Seattle, WA	P12N	W 48–16	68,384
September 23	7:00 p.m.	at Colorado	No. 7	Folsom Field; Boulder, CO	FS1	W 37–10	47,666
September 30	5:00 p.m.	at Oregon State	No. 6	Reser Stadium; Corvallis, OR	P12N	W 42–7	37,821
October 7	7:45 p.m.	California	No. 6	Husky Stadium; Seattle, WA	ESPN	W 38–7	67,429
October 14	7:45 p.m.	at Arizona State	No. 5	Sun Devil Stadium; Tempe, AZ	ESPN	L 7–13	51,234
October 28	12:30 p.m.	UCLA^{†}	No. 12	Husky Stadium; Seattle, WA	ABC/ESPN2	W 44–23	69,847
November 4	7:00 p.m.	Oregon	No. 12	Husky Stadium; Seattle, WA (rivalry)	FS1	W 38–3	70,572
November 10	7:30 p.m.	at Stanford	No. 9	Stanford Stadium; Stanford, CA	FS1	L 22–30	44,589
November 18	7:30 p.m.	Utah	No. 18	Husky Stadium; Seattle, WA	ESPN	W 33–30	65,767
November 25	5:00 p.m.	No. 13 Washington State	No. 17	Husky Stadium; Seattle, WA (Apple Cup)	FOX	W 41–14	71,265
December 30	1:00 p.m.	vs. No. 9 Penn State*	No. 11	University of Phoenix Stadium; Glendale, AZ (Fiesta Bowl)	ESPN	L 28–35	61,842
*Non-conference game; ^{†}Homecoming; Rankings from AP Poll and CFP Rankings after October 31 released prior to game; All times are in Pacific time; Source:

== Rankings ==
Ranking movements Legend: ██ Increase in ranking ██ Decrease in ranking
	Week															
Poll	Pre	1	2	3	4	5	6	7	8	9	10	11	12	13	14	Final
AP	8	7	6	7	6	6	5	12	12	12	9	16	15	13	12	16
Coaches	7	7	6	6	6	5	4	12	11	11	8	15	14	13	12	15
CFP	Not released									12	9	18	17	13	11	Not released

== Game summaries ==
=== At Rutgers ===
Washington Huskies at Rutgers Scarlet Knights – Game summary

Quarter	1	2	3	4	Total
No. 8 Washington	3	7	10	10	30
Rutgers	7	0	0	7	14

at High Point Solutions Stadium • Piscataway, NJ

- Date: September 1, 2017
- Game time: 5:05 p.m.
- Game weather: 66° • Mostly cloudy • Wind ENE @ 1 mph
- Game attendance: 46,093
- Referee: Larry Smith
- TV announcers (Fox Sports 1): Gus Johnson, Joel Klatt and Jenny Taft

Game information

Top passers

- UW – Jake Browning: 17/30, 284 yards, 2 touchdowns
- RU – Kyle Bolin: 24/34, 178 yards, 2 touchdowns, 2 interceptions

Top rushers

- UW – Myles Gaskin: 7 attempts, 59 yards
- RU – Gus Edwards: 24 attempts, 79 yards

Top receiving

- UW – Dante Pettis: 3 receptions, 85 yards
- RU – Damon Mitchell: 4 receptions, 46 yards

=== Montana ===
Montana Grizzlies at Washington Huskies – Game summary

Quarter	1	2	3	4	Total
Montana	7	0	0	0	7
No. 7 Washington	21	14	14	14	63

at Husky Stadium • Seattle, WA

- Date: September 9, 2017
- Game time: 5:10 p.m.
- Game weather: 66° • Cloudy • Wind SW @ 9 mph
- Game attendance: 68,491
- Referee: Kevin Mar
- TV announcers (Pac-12 Network): Guy Haberman, Chad Brown, and Cindy Brunson

Game information

Top passers

- UM – Reese Phillips: 17/28, 123 yards, 2 interceptions
- UW – Jake Browning: 22/26, 259 yards, 2 touchdowns, 1 interception

Top rushers

- UM – Jeremy Calhoun: 18 attempts, 42 yards
- UW – Salvon Ahmed: 9 attempts, 54 yards, 1 touchdown

Top receiving

- UM – Josh Horner: 5 receptions, 34 yards
- UW – Will Dissly: 5 receptions, 79 yards, 2 touchdowns

=== Fresno State ===
Fresno State Bulldogs at Washington Huskies – Game summary

Quarter	1	2	3	4	Total
Fresno State	0	7	6	3	16
No. 6 Washington	27	14	7	0	48

at Husky Stadium • Seattle, WA

- Date: September 16, 2017
- Game time: 6:40 p.m.
- Game weather: 67° • Hazy • No wind
- Game attendance: 68,384
- Referee: Michael Mothershed
- TV announcers (Pac-12 Network): Ted Robinson, Yogi Roth, and Jill Savage

Game information

Top passers

- FSU – Chason Virgil: 11/20, 98 yards, 1 touchdown, 1 interception,
- UW – Jake Browning: 19/22, 255 yards, 4 touchdowns

Top rushers

- FSU – Ronnie Rivers: 10 attempts, 29 yards
- UW – Myles Gaskin: 8 attempts, 56 yards, 2 touchdowns

Top receiving

- FSU – KeeSean Johnson: 4 receptions, 51 yards
- UW – Hunter Bryant: 3 receptions, 99 yards

=== At Colorado ===
Washington Huskies at Colorado Buffaloes – Game summary

Quarter	1	2	3	4	Total
No. 7 Washington	0	10	14	13	37
Colorado	7	0	3	0	10

at Folsom Field • Boulder, CO

- Date: September 23, 2017
- Game time: 7:12 p.m.
- Game weather: 45° • Rainy • Wind NE @ 8 mph
- Game attendance: 47,666
- Referee: Land Clark
- TV announcers (Fox Sports 1): Tim Brando, Spencer Tillman, and Holly Sonders

Game information

Top passers

- UW – Jake Browning: 11/21, 160 yards, 1 touchdown, 1 interception
- CU – Steven Montez: 21/27, 171 yards, 3 interceptions

Top rushers

- UW – Myles Gaskin: 27 attempts, 202 yards, 2 touchdowns
- CU – Phillip Lindsay: 19 attempts, 68 yrds, 1 touchdown

Top receiving

- UW – Dante Pettis: 3 receptions, 54 yards
- CU – Devin Ross: 4 receptions, 41 yards

=== At Oregon State ===
Washington Huskies at Oregon State Beavers – Game summary

Quarter	1	2	3	4	Total
No. 6 Washington	7	0	21	14	42
Oregon State	0	0	0	7	7

at Reser Stadium • Corvallis, OR

- Date: September 30, 2017
- Game time: 5:07 p.m.
- Game weather: 62° • Partly cloudy • Wind NE @ 5 mph
- Game attendance: 37,821
- Referee: Terry Leyden
- TV announcers (Pac-12 Network): Roxy Bernstein, Anthony Herron, and Lewis Johnson

Game information

Top passers

- UW – Jake Browning: 26/34, 293 yards, 3 touchdowns, 1 interception
- OSU – Darrell Garretson: 11/22, 74 yards

Top rushers

- UW – Myles Gaskin: 15 attempts, 113 yards, 1 touchdown
- OSU – Thomas Tyner: 9 attempts, 54 yards, 1 touchdown

Top receiving

- UW – Dante Pettis: 12 receptions, 105 yards, 3 touchdowns
- OSU – Ryan Nall: 5 receptions, 44 yards

=== California ===
California Golden Bears at Washington Huskies – Game summary

Quarter	1	2	3	4	Total
California	0	0	7	0	7
No. 6 Washington	7	17	7	7	38

at Husky Stadium • Seattle, WA

- Date: October 7, 2017
- Game time: 7:50 p.m.
- Game weather: 53° • Misty • Wind S @ 6 mph
- Game attendance: 67,429
- Referee: Steve Strimling
- TV announcers (ESPN): Mark Jones, Rod Gilmore and Quint Kessenich

Game information

Top passers

- CAL – Ross Bowers: 11/18, 80 yards
- UW – Jake Browning: 27/40, 215 yards, 2 touchdowns

Top rushers

- CAL – Derrick Clark: 5 attempts, 19 yards
- UW – Myles Gaskin: 24 attempts, 91 yards, 2 touchdowns

Top receiving

- CAL – Patrick Laird: 5 receptions, 28 yards
- UW – Hunter Bryant: 9 receptions, 121 yards, 1 touchdown

=== At Arizona State ===
Washington Huskies at Arizona State Sun Devils – Game summary

Quarter	1	2	3	4	Total
No. 5 Washington	0	0	0	7	7
Arizona State	7	6	0	0	13

at Sun Devil Stadium • Tempe, AZ

- Date: October 14, 2017
- Game time: 7:45 p.m.
- Game weather: 83° • Clear skies • Wind SW @ 4 mph
- Game attendance: 51,124
- Referee: Mark Duddy
- TV announcers (ESPN): Dave Pasch, Greg McElroy and Tom Luginbill

Game information

Top passers

- UW – Jake Browning: 17/30, 139 yards
- ASU – Manny Wilkins: 29/41, 241 yards

Top rushers

- UW – Myles Gaskin: 14 attempts, 67 yards
- ASU – Demario Richard: 8 attempts, 23 yards

Top receiving

- UW – Dante Pettis: 7 receptions, 56 yards
- ASU – N'Keal Harry: 9 receptions, 79 yards

=== UCLA ===
UCLA Bruins at Washington Huskies – Game summary

Quarter	1	2	3	4	Total
UCLA	3	6	0	14	23
No. 12 Washington	3	17	17	7	44

at Husky Stadium • Seattle, WA

- Date: October 28, 2017
- Game time: 12:41 p.m.
- Game weather: 65°F • Sunny • Wind NW @ 4 mph
- Game attendance: 69,847
- Referee: Michael Mothershed
- TV announcers (ABC): Bob Wischusen, Brock Huard and Allison Williams

Game information

Top passers

- UCLA – Josh Rosen: 12/21, 93 yards, 1 touchdown
- UW – Jake Browning: 8/11, 98 yards, 1 interception

Top rushers

- UCLA – Soso Jamabo: 9 attempts, 28 yards
- UW – Myles Gaskin: 27 attempts, 169 yards, 1 touchdown

Top receiving

- UCLA – Darren Andrews: 8 receptions 73 yards, 1 touchdown
- UW – Lavon Coleman: 2 receptions, 46 yards

=== Oregon ===
Oregon Ducks at Washington Huskies – Game summary

Quarter	1	2	3	4	Total
Oregon	3	0	0	0	3
No. 12 Washington	0	17	21	0	38

at Husky Stadium • Seattle, WA

- Date: November 4, 2017
- Game time: 7:00 p.m.
- Game weather: 40° • Mostly cloudy • Wind N @ 7 mph
- Game attendance: 70,572
- Referee: Terry Leyden
- TV announcers (Fox Sports 1): Aaron Goldsmith, Danny Kanell and A. J. Hawk

Game information

Top passers

- UO – Braxton Burmeister: 7/13, 31 yards, 1 interception
- UW – Jake Browning: 11/19, 204 yards, 2 touchdowns, 1 interception

Top rushers

- UO – Royce Freeman: 24 attempts, 122 yards
- UW – Myles Gaskin: 17 attempts, 123 yards, 1 touchdown

Top receiving

- UO – Charles Nelson: 4 receptions, 18 yards
- UW – Dante Pettis: 4 receptions, 87 yards, 1 touchdown

=== At Stanford ===
Washington Huskies at Stanford Cardinal – Game summary

Quarter	1	2	3	4	Total
No. 9 Washington	7	7	0	8	22
Stanford	0	10	10	10	30

at Stanford Stadium • Stanford, CA

- Date: November 10, 2017
- Game time: 7:45 p.m.
- Game weather: 56° • Partly cloudy • Wind NW @ 3 mph
- Game attendance: 44,589
- Referee: Land Clark
- TV announcers (Fox Sports 1): Justin Kutcher, Mark Helfrich and Petros Papadakis

Game information

Top passers

- UW – Jake Browning: 17/23, 190 yards
- SU – K. J. Costello: 16/27, 211 yards

Top rushers

- UW – Myles Gaskin: 18 attempts, 120 yards, 3 touchdowns
- SU – Bryce Love: 18 attempts, 166 yards, 3 touchdowns

Top receiving

- UW – Aaron Fuller: 4 receptions, 53 yards
- SU – J. J. Arcega-Whiteside: 5 receptions, 130 yards

=== Utah ===
Utah Utes at Washington Huskies – Game summary

Quarter	1	2	3	4	Total
Utah	7	6	10	7	30
No. 16 Washington	6	10	7	10	33

at Husky Stadium • Seattle, WA

- Date: November 18, 2017
- Game time: 7:36 p.m.
- Game weather: 45° • Partly cloudy • No wind
- Game attendance: 65,767
- Referee: Mark Duddy
- TV announcers (ESPN): Mark Jones, Rod Gilmore and Quint Kessenich

Game information

Top passers

- UU – Tyler Huntley: 19/27, 293 yards, 2 TDs
- UW – Jake Browning: 26/35, 354 yards, 2 TDs

Top rushers

- UU – Zack Moss: 17 attempts, 55 yards
- UW – Myles Gaskin: 17 attempts, 52 yards, 2 TDs

Top receiving

- UU – Raelon Singleton: 5 receptions, 81 yards, 2 TDs
- UW – Myles Gaskin: 6 receptions, 114 yards, 1 TD

=== Washington State ===
Washington State Cougars at Washington Huskies – Game summary

Quarter	1	2	3	4	Total
No. 14 Washington State	0	0	0	14	14
No. 15 Washington	7	17	10	7	41

at Husky Stadium • Seattle, WA

- Date: November 25, 2017
- Game time: 5:15 p.m.
- Game weather: 49° • Light rain • No wind
- Game attendance: 71,265
- Referee: Kevin Mar
- TV announcers (FOX): Joe Davis, Brady Quinn and Bruce Feldman

Game information

Top passers

- WSU – Luke Falk: 37/55, 369 yards, 1 touchdowns, 3 interceptions
- UW – Jake Browning: 11/17, 93 yards

Top rushers

- WSU – Jamal Morrow: 5 attempts, 11 yards, 1 touchdown
- UW – Myles Gaskin: 25 attempts, 192 yards, 4 touchdowns

Top receiving

- WSU – Jamal Morrow: 10 receptions, 76 yards
- UW – Ty Jones: 2 receptions, 23 yards

=== vs Penn State (Fiesta Bowl) ===
Fiesta Bowl – Game summary

Quarter	1	2	3	4	Total
No. 12 Washington	0	14	7	7	28
No. 9 Penn State	14	14	7	0	35

at University of Phoenix Stadium • Glendale, AZ

- Date: December 30, 2017
- Game time: 1:10 p.m.
- Game weather: 70° • Indoors
- Game attendance: 61,842
- Referee: Mike Defee (Big 12)
- TV announcers (ESPN): Dave Pasch, Greg McElroy and Tom Luginbill

Game information

Top passers

- UW – Jake Browning: 18/28, 175 yards, 1 touchdown
- PSU – Trace McSorley: 32/41, 342 yards, 2 touchdowns, 2 interceptions

Top rushers

- UW – Myles Gaskin: 14 attempts, 98 yards, 2 touchdowns
- PSU – Saquon Barkley; 18 attempts, 137 yards, 2 touchdowns

Top receiving

- UW – Aaron Fuller: 6 receptions, 61 yards, 1 touchdown
- PSU – DaeSean Hamilton: 5 receptions, 110 yards, 2 touchdowns

== Awards and honors ==
=== Coaches ===
Pete Kwiatkowski – Defensive coordinator

- Broyles Award : Semi-Finalist

=== Offense ===
Dante Pettis – Wide receiver – Senior

- Paul Hornung Award (most versatile player) : Finalist

=== Special teams ===
Dante Pettis – Return specialist – Senior

- Jet Award (top return specialist) : Winner

=== All-Pac-12 Individual awards ===
Vita Vea – Defensive tackle – (redshirt) Junior

- Pat Tillman Defensive Player of the Year
- Morris Trophy

=== Pac-12 All-Conference Team ===
First team

- Dante Pettis – Wide receiver/Return specialist – Senior
- Kaleb McGary – Offensive tackle – (redshirt) Junior
- Coleman Shelton – Center – (redshirt) Senior
- Vita Vea – Defensive tackle – (redshirt) Junior
- Taylor Rapp – Safety – Sophomore

Second team

- Myles Gaskin – Running back – Junior
- Will Dissly – Tight end – Senior
- Greg Gaines – Defensive tackle – (redshirt) Junior
- Keishawn Bierria – Linebacker – (redshirt) Senior
- Ben Burr-Kirven – Linebacker – Junior
- Jojo McIntosh – Safety – (redshirt) Junior

Honorable mention

- Salvon Ahmed – Running back – Freshman
- Tevis Bartlett – Linebacker – Junior
- Jake Browning – Quarterback – Junior
- Myles Bryant – Cornerback – Sophomore
- Nick Harris – Guard – Sophomore

== NFL Scouting Combine ==
Seven members of the 2017 team were invited to participate in drills at the 2018 NFL Scouting Combine held between February 27 and March 5, 2018 at Lucas Oil Stadium in Indianapolis, Indiana.

#	Name	POS	HT	WT	Arms	Hands	40	Bench press	Vert jump	Broad jump	3-cone drill	20-yd shuttle	60-yd shuttle	Ref
LB04	Keishawn Bierria	LB	6'2"	223	31 1/8"	9 3/8"	4.79	21 reps	30.5"	117"	7.26	–	–	
RB06	Lavon Coleman	RB	5'11"	223	30 1/2"	9 1/4"	4.65	23 reps*	33"	120"	–	–	–	
TE05	Will Dissly	TE	6'4"	267	32"	10 1/4"	4.87	15 reps	28"	111"	7.07*	4.40	12.12*	
WO27	Dante Pettis	WR	6'1"	192	32 1/4"	9 1/2"	–	–	–	–	–	–	–	
OL39	Coleman Shelton	OL	6'4"	295	31 1/2"	8 1/2"	5.21	–	26.5"	110"	7.62	4.59	–	
DL22	Vita Vea	DT	6'4"	344	32 5/8"	10"	5.10	41 reps*	–	–	–	–	–	
LB39	Azeem Victor	LB	6'1"	230	33"	9 3/8"	4.72	19 reps	32.5"	115"	7.20	4.40	–	

* Top position performer

== NFL draft ==
The 2018 NFL draft was held at AT&T Stadium in Arlington, Texas on April 26 through April 28, 2018. The following Washington players were either selected or signed as undrafted free agents following the draft.

Player	Position	Round	Overall pick	NFL team
Vita Vea	DT	1	12	Tampa Bay Buccaneers
Dante Pettis	WR	2	44	San Francisco 49ers
Will Dissly	TE	4	120	Seattle Seahawks
Azeem Victor	ILB	6	216	Oakland Raiders
Keishawn Bierria	ILB	6	217	Denver Broncos
Lavon Coleman	RB	UDFA	—	Houston Texans
Coleman Shelton	OL	UDFA	—	San Francisco 49ers
Ezekiel Turner	S	UDFA	—	Arizona Cardinals

== Notes ==
1. Due to injury, Dante Pettis did not participate in combine drills.
