= 2017 Pac-12 Conference football season =

American college football season

- League: NCAA Division I Football Bowl Subdivision
- Sport: American football
- Teams: 12
- TV partner(s): Fox Sports Media Group, (Fox, FS1), ESPN Family, (ABC, ESPN, ESPN2, ESPNU), and Pac-12 Networks

2018 NFL Draft
- Top draft pick: QB Sam Darnold, USC
- Picked by: New York Jets, 3rd overall

Regular season
- Top scorer: Myles Gaskin, RB (132 points)
- North champions: Stanford Cardinal; Washington Huskies
- North runners-up: Washington State Cougars
- South champions: USC Trojans
- South runners-up: Arizona State Sun Devils

Pac–12 Championship
- Champions: USC
- Runners-up: Stanford Cardinal
- Finals MVP: Sam Darnold, QB

Seasons
- 2016 2018

2017 Pac-12 Conference football standings
	Conf.			Overall
Team	W		L	W		L
North Division
No. 20 Stanford xy	7	–	2	9	–	5
No. 16 Washington x	7	–	2	10	–	3
Washington State	6	–	3	9	–	4
Oregon	4	–	5	7	–	6
California	2	–	7	5	–	7
Oregon State	0	–	9	1	–	11
South Division
No. 12 USC xy$	8	–	1	11	–	3
Arizona State	6	–	3	7	–	6
Arizona	5	–	4	7	–	6
UCLA	4	–	5	6	–	7
Utah	3	–	6	7	–	6
Colorado	2	–	7	5	–	7
Championship: USC 31, Stanford 28
$ – Conference champion; x – Division champion/co-champions; y – Championship game participant; Rankings from AP Poll

The 2017 Pac–12 Conference football season is the seventh for the twelve-team league. The season began on August 26, 2017, and ended with the Pac-12 Championship Game on December 1, 2017, at Levi's Stadium.

== Pre-season ==
2017 Pac-12 Spring Football and number of signees on signing day:

North Division

- California – 14 signees
- Oregon – 24 signees
- Oregon State – 24 signees
- Stanford – 14 signees
- Washington – 18 signees
- Washington State – 27 signees

South Division

- Arizona – 34 signees
- Arizona State – 19 signees
- Colorado – 28 signees
- UCLA – 18 signees
- USC – 26 signees
- Utah – 21 signees

=== Pac-12 media days ===
The Pac-12 conducted its annual media days at the Loews Hollywood Hotel, – The Loews Hollywood Hotel in Hollywood, CA between July 26 and July 27. The event commenced with a speech by Pac-12 commissioner Larry Scott, and all 12 teams sent their head coaches and two selected players to speak with members of the media. The event along with all speakers and interviews were broadcast live on the Pac-12 Network. The teams and representatives in respective order were as follows:

Wednesday

- Pac-12 Commissioner – Larry Scott
- Washington – Chris Petersen (HC), Jake Browning (QB) & Keishawn Bierria (LB)
- Arizona – Rich Rodriguez (HC), Jacob Alsadek (OL) & Luca Bruno, (DL)
- California – Justin Wilcox (HC), Tre Watson (RB) & James Looney (DT)
- UCLA – Jim Mora (HC), Scott Quessenberry (OT) & Kenny Young (LB)
- Oregon State – Gary Andersen (HC), Ryan Nall (RB) & Manase Hungalu (LB)
- Colorado – Mike MacIntyre (HC), Phillip Lindsay (RB) & Derek McCartney (LB)

Thursday

- Pac-12 VP of Officiating – David Coleman
- Utah – Kyle Whittingham (HC), Salesi Uhatafe (RG) & Filipo Mokofisi (DT)
- Oregon – Willie Taggart (HC), Justin Herbert (QB) & Troy Dye (LB)
- Arizona State – Todd Graham (HC), Kalen Ballage (RB) & JoJo Wicker (DL)
- Stanford – David Shaw (HC), Bryce Love (RB) & Harrison Phillips (DT)
- Washington State – Mike Leach (HC), Jamal Morrow (RB) & Peyton Pelluer (LB)
- USC – Clay Helton (HC), Sam Darnold (QB) & Cameron Smith (LB)

==== Preseason Media Polls ====
The Pac-12 Media Days concluded with its annual preseason media polls. Since 1992, the credentialed media has gotten the preseason champion correct just five times. Only eight times has the preseason pick even made it to the Pac-12 title game. Below are the results of the media poll with total points received next to each school and first-place votes in parentheses.

Pac-12 Champion Voting

- USC – 28
- Washington – 22
- Oregon – 1
- Utah – 1

North Division

1. Washington Huskies (309 pts., 49 votes)
2. Stanford Cardinal (247 pts., 1 vote)
3. Washington State Cougars (206 pts., 1 vote)
4. Oregon Ducks (163 pts., 1 vote)
5. Oregon State Beavers (101 pts.)
6. California Golden Bears (64 pts.)

South Division

1. USC Trojans (309 pts., 49 votes)
2. Utah Utes (220 pts., 1 vote)
3. UCLA Bruins (209 pts., 1 vote)
4. Colorado Buffaloes (182 pts., 1 vote)
5. Arizona State Sun Devils (109 pts)
6. Arizona Wildcats (61 pts.)

=== Recruiting classes ===
Rankings
Team	ESPN	Rivals	Scout	24/7	Signees
Arizona	39	41	41	42	34
Arizona State	26	20	17	19	19
California	-	29	36	34	14
Colorado	-	71	75	69	28
Oregon	15	17	21	16	24
Oregon State	-	71	63	60	24
Stanford	27	18	25	24	14
UCLA	11	13	9	12	18
USC	3	1	1	2	26
Utah	-	41	53	45	18
Washington	28	30	23	27	21
Washington State	-	55	38	41	27

== Head coaches ==
=== Coaching changes ===
There were two coaching changes following the 2017 season including Justin Wilcox with California and Willie Taggart with Oregon.

=== Coaches ===
Team	Head coach	Years at school	Overall record	Record at school	Pac-12 record
Arizona	Rich Rodriguez	6	162–116–2 (.582)	42–32 (.568)	23–28 (.451)
Arizona State	Todd Graham	6	93–59 (.612)	44–30 (.595)	29–22 (.569)
California	Justin Wilcox	1	5–5 (.500)	5–5 (.500)	2–5 (.286)
Colorado	Mike MacIntyre	5	40–57 (.412)	25–36 (.410)	12–31 (.279)
Oregon	Willie Taggart	1	47–50 (.485)	7-5 (.583)	4–5 (.444)
Oregon State	Cory Hall	1	0–6 (.000)	0–6 (.000)	0–6 (.000)
Stanford	David Shaw	7	70–20 (.778)	70–20 (.778)	47–14 (.770)
UCLA	Jim L. Mora	6	45-29 (.608)	45–29 (.608)	27–25 (.519)
USC	Clay Helton	4	24–9 (.727)	24–9 (.727)	18–4 (.818)
Utah	Kyle Whittingham	13	109–54 (.669)	109–54 (.669)	27–33 (.450)
Washington	Chris Petersen	4	127–27 (.825)	35–15 (.700)	22–12 (.647)
Washington State	Mike Leach	6	121–79 (.605)	37–36 (.507)	25–27 (.481)

== Rankings ==
		Pre	Wk 2	Wk 3	Wk 4	Wk 5	Wk 6	Wk 7	Wk 8	Wk 9	Wk 10	Wk 11	Wk 12	Wk 13	Wk 14	Wk 15	Final
Arizona Wildcats	AP										23	RV	RV				
Arizona Wildcats	C	RV	RV							RV	25	RV	RV				
Arizona Wildcats	CFP	Not released									22						
Arizona State Sun Devils	AP																
Arizona State Sun Devils	C									RV							
Arizona State Sun Devils	CFP	Not released															
California Golden Bears	AP		RV	RV	RV	RV											
California Golden Bears	C		RV		RV												
California Golden Bears	CFP	Not released															
Colorado Buffaloes	AP	RV	RV	RV	RV	RV											
Colorado Buffaloes	C	RV	RV	RV	RV	RV											
Colorado Buffaloes	CFP	Not released															
Oregon Ducks	AP	RV	RV	RV	24	RV	RV										
Oregon Ducks	C	RV	RV	RV	24	RV	RV										
Oregon Ducks	CFP	Not released															
Oregon State Beavers	AP																
Oregon State Beavers	C																
Oregon State Beavers	CFP	Not released															
Stanford Cardinal	AP	14	14	19	RV	RV	RV	23	22	20	18	RV	20	20	14	15	20
Stanford Cardinal	C	14	14	19	RV	RV	RV	25	22	20	18	RV	23	20	15	16	19
Stanford Cardinal	CFP	Not released									21		22	21	12	13	
UCLA Bruins	AP	RV	RV	25													
UCLA Bruins	C	RV	RV	RV													
UCLA Bruins	CFP	Not released															
USC Trojans	AP	4	6	4	5	5	14	13	11	21	17	15	12	11	11	8	12
USC Trojans	C	4	5	4	5	5	15	13	10	21	17	14	10	10	9	7	10
USC Trojans	CFP	Not released									17	11	11	11	10	8	
Utah Utes	AP	RV	RV	RV	23	20	20	RV	RV	20							
Utah Utes	C	25	23	24	21	19	18	23	RV	23							RV
Utah Utes	CFP	Not released															
Washington Huskies	AP	8	7	6	7	6	6	5	12	12	12	9	16	15	13	12	16
Washington Huskies	C	7	7	6	6	6	5	4	12	11	11	8	15	14	13	12	15
Washington Huskies	CFP	Not released									12	9	18	17	13	11	
Washington State Cougars	AP	24	20	21	18	16	11	8	15	15	25	19	15	14	21	21	RV
Washington State Cougars	C	RV	22	22	18	16	11	9	18	16	RV	20	16	15	22	21	RV
Washington State Cougars	CFP	Not released									25	19	14	13	18	18	

	Increase in ranking
	Decrease in ranking
	Not ranked previous week
	Selected for College Football Playoff
(Italics)	Number of first place votes
т	Tied with team above or below also with this symbol

== Schedule ==
Index to colors and formatting
Pac-12 member won
Pac-12 member lost
Pac-12 teams in **bold**

All times Pacific time. Pac-12 teams in bold.

Rankings reflect those of the AP poll for that week.

=== Regular season ===
==== Week 1 ====
Date	Time	Visiting team	Home team	Site	TV	Result	Attendance	Ref.
August 26	12:00 p.m.	**Oregon State**	Colorado State	Colorado State Stadium • Fort Collins, CO	CBSSN	**L** 27–58	37,583	
August 26	7:00 p.m.	No. 14 **Stanford**	Rice	Allianz Stadium • Sydney, Australia	ESPN	**W** 62–7	33,101	
August 31	4:30 p.m.	North Dakota	**Utah**	Rice-Eccles Stadium • Salt Lake City, UT	P12N	**W** 37–16	45,905	
August 31	7:30 p.m.	New Mexico State	**Arizona State**	Sun Devil Stadium • Tempe, AZ	P12N	**W** 37–31	46,596	
September 1	5:00 p.m.	No. 8 **Washington**	Rutgers	High Point Solutions Stadium • Piscataway, NJ	FS1	**W** 30–14	46,093	
September 1	5:00 p.m.	Colorado State	**Colorado**	Sports Authority Field at Mile High • Denver, CO	P12N	**W** 17–3	73,932	
September 2	9:20 a.m.	**California**	North Carolina	Kenan Memorial Stadium • Chapel Hill, NC	ACCN	**W** 35–30	49,500	
September 2	11:00 a.m.	Portland State	**Oregon State**	Reser Stadium • Corvallis, OR	P12N	**W** 35–32	34,737	
September 2	2:15 p.m.	Western Michigan	No. 4 **USC**	LA Memorial Coliseum • Los Angeles, CA	P12N	**W** 49–31	61,125	
September 2	5:15 p.m.	Southern Utah	**Oregon**	Autzen Stadium • Eugene, OR	P12N	**W** 77–21	52,204	
September 2	7:30 p.m.	Montana State	No. 24 **Washington State**	Martin Stadium • Pullman, WA	FS1	**W** 31–0	30,254	
September 2	8:00 p.m.	Northern Arizona	**Arizona**	Arizona Stadium • Tucson, AZ	P12N	**W** 62–24	43,620	
September 3	4:30 p.m.	Texas A&M	**UCLA**	Rose Bowl • Pasadena, CA	FOX	**W** 45–44	64,635	
^{#}Rankings from AP Poll released prior to game. All times are in Pacific Time.

==== Week 2 ====
Date	Time	Visiting team	Home team	Site	TV	Result	Attendance	Ref.
September 9	11:00 a.m.	Texas State	**Colorado**	Folsom Field • Boulder, CO	P12N	**W** 37–3	43,822	
September 9	1:30 p.m.	Nebraska	**Oregon**	Autzen Stadium • Eugene, OR	FOX	**W** 42–35	58,389	
September 9	2:00 p.m.	Weber State	**California**	California Memorial Stadium • Berkeley, CA	P12N	**W** 33–20	36,209	
September 9	2:00 p.m.	Hawaii	**UCLA**	Rose Bowl • Pasadena, CA	P12N	**W** 56–23	50,444	
September 9	5:00 p.m.	Montana	No. 7 **Washington**	Husky Stadium • Seattle, WA	P12N	**W** 63–7	68.491	
September 9	5:00 p.m.	No. 14 **Stanford**	No. 6 **USC**	LA Memorial Coliseum • Los Angeles, CA	FOX	**USC** 42–24	77,614	
September 9	7:00 p.m.	Minnesota	**Oregon State**	Reeser Stadium • Corvallis, OR	FS1	**L** 14–48	35,206	
September 9	7:15 p.m.	**Utah**	BYU	LaVell Edwards Stadium • Provo, UT (Holy War)	ESPN2	**W** 19–13	63,470	
September 9	7:30 p.m.	Boise State	No. 20 **Washington State**	Martin Stadium • Pullman, WA	ESPN	**W** 47–44^{3OT}	32,631	
September 9	7:30 p.m.	Houston	**Arizona**	Arizona Stadium • Tucson, AZ	ESPNU	**L** 16–19	43,334	
September 9	8:00 p.m.	San Diego State	**Arizona State**	Sun Devil Stadium • Tempe, AZ	P12N	**L** 20–30	54,336	
^{#}Rankings from AP Poll released prior to game. All times are in Pacific Time.

==== Week 3 ====
Date	Time	Visiting team	Home team	Site	TV	Result	Attendance	Ref.
September 15	7:15 p.m.	**Arizona**	UTEP	Sun Bowl Stadium • El Paso, TX	ESPN	**W** 63–16	22,133	
September 16	9:00 a.m.	No. 25 **UCLA**	Memphis	Liberty Bowl Memorial Stadium • Memphis, TN	ABC	**L** 45–48	46,291	
September 16	11:00 a.m.	Northern Colorado	**Colorado**	Folsom Field • Boulder, CO	P12N	**W** 41–21	44,318	
September 16	2:30 p.m.	**Oregon State**	No. 21 **Washington State**	Martin Stadium • Pullman, WA	P12N	**WSU** 52–23	32,487	
September 16	4:00 p.m.	**Oregon**	Wyoming	War Memorial Stadium • Laramie, WY	CBSSN	**W** 49–13	29,139	
September 16	5:00 p.m.	**Arizona State**	Texas Tech	Jones AT&T Stadium • Lubbock, TX	FSN	**L** 45–52	58,547	
September 16	5:30 p.m.	Texas	No. 4 **USC**	LA Memorial Coliseum • Los Angeles, CA	FOX	**W** 27–24^{2OT}	84,714	
September 16	6:30 p.m.	Fresno State	No. 6 **Washington**	Husky Stadium • Seattle, WA	P12N	**W** 48–16	68,384	
September 16	7:00 p.m.	San Jose State	**Utah**	Rice-Eccles Stadium • Salt Lake City, UT	ESPN2	**W** 54–16	45,881	
September 16	7:30 p.m.	Ole Miss	**California**	California Memorial Stadium • Berkeley, CA	ESPN	**W** 27–16	37,125	
September 16	7:30 p.m.	No. 19 **Stanford**	San Diego State	Qualcomm Stadium • San Diego, CA	CBSSN	**L** 17–20	43,040	
^{#}Rankings from AP Poll released prior to game. All times are in Pacific Time.

==== Week 4 ====
Date	Time	Visiting team	Home team	Site	TV	Result	Attendance	Ref.
September 22	7:30 p.m.	No. 23 **Utah**	**Arizona**	Arizona Stadium • Tucson, AZ	FS1	**UTAH** 30–24	36,651	
September 23	12:30 p.m.	No. 5 **USC**	**California**	California Memorial Stadium • Berkeley, CA	ABC	**USC** 30–20	46,747	
September 23	3:00 p.m.	Nevada	No. 18 **Washington State**	Martin Stadium • Pullman, WA	P12N	**W** 45–7	30,317	
September 23	7:00 p.m.	No. 24 **Oregon**	**Arizona State**	Sun Devil Stadium • Tempe, AZ	P12N	**ASU** 37–35	50,110	
September 23	7:00 p.m.	No. 7 **Washington**	**Colorado**	Folsom Field • Boulder, CO	FS1	**WASH** 37–10	47,666	
September 23	7:30 p.m.	**UCLA**	**Stanford**	Stanford Stadium • Stanford, CA	ESPN	**STAN** 58–34	48,042	
^{#}Rankings from AP Poll released prior to game. All times are in Pacific Time.

Date	Bye Week
September 23	Oregon State

==== Week 5 ====
Date	Time	Visiting team	Home team	Site	TV	Result	Attendance	Ref.
September 29	7:30 p.m.	No. 5 **USC**	No. 16 **Washington State**	Martin Stadium • Pullman, WA	ESPN	**WSU** 30–27	33,773	
September 30	1:00 p.m.	**Arizona State**	**Stanford**	Stanford Stadium • Stanford, CA	P12N	**STAN** 34–24	44,422	
September 30	5:00 p.m.	No. 6 **Washington**	**Oregon State**	Reser Stadium • Corvallis, OR	P12N	**WASH** 42–7	37,821	
September 30	7:30 p.m.	**Colorado**	**UCLA**	Rose Bowl • Pasadena, CA	ESPN2	**UCLA** 27–23	61,338	
September 30	7:30 p.m.	**California**	**Oregon**	Autzen Stadium • Eugene, OR	FS1	**ORE** 45–24	55,707	
^{#}Rankings from AP Poll released prior to game. All times are in Pacific Time.

Date	Bye Week	
September 30	Arizona	Utah

==== Week 6 ====
Date	Time	Visiting team	Home team	Site	TV	Result	Attendance	Ref.
October 7	1:00 p.m.	**Oregon State**	No. 14 **USC**	LA Memorial Coliseum • Los Angeles, CA	P12N	**USC** 38–10	60,314	
October 7	5:00 p.m.	No. 11 **Washington State**	**Oregon**	Autzen Stadium • Eugene, OR	FOX	**WSU** 33–10	56,653	
October 7	5:00 p.m.	**Arizona**	**Colorado**	Folsom Field • Boulder, CO	P12N	**ARZ** 45–42	49,976	
October 7	7:15 p.m.	**Stanford**	No. 20 **Utah**	Rice-Eccles Stadium • Salt Lake City, UT	FS1	**STAN** 23–20	45,991	
October 7	7:45 p.m.	**California**	No. 6 **Washington**	Husky Stadium • Seattle, WA	ESPN	**WASH** 38–7	67,429	
^{#}Rankings from AP Poll released prior to game. All times are in Pacific Time.

Date	Bye Week	
October 7	Arizona State	UCLA

==== Week 7 ====
Date	Time	Visiting team	Home team	Site	TV	Result	Attendance	Ref.
October 13	7:30 p.m.	No. 8 **Washington State**	**California**	California Memorial Stadium • Berkeley, CA	ESPN	**CAL** 37–3	26,244	
October 14	1:00 p.m.	**Colorado**	**Oregon State**	Reser Stadium • Corvallis, OR	P12N	**COLO** 36–33	33,785	
October 14	5:00 p.m.	**Utah**	No. 13 **USC**	LA Memorial Coliseum • Los Angeles, CA	ABC	**USC** 28–27	72,382	
October 14	6:00 p.m.	**UCLA**	**Arizona**	Arizona Stadium • Tucson, AZ	P12N	**ARZ** 47–30	48,380	
October 14	7:45 p.m.	No. 5 **Washington**	**Arizona State**	Sun Devil Stadium • Tempe, AZ	ESPN	**ASU** 13–7	51,234	
October 14	8:00 p.m.	**Oregon**	No. 23 **Stanford**	Stanford Stadium • Stanford, CA	FS1	**STAN** 49–7	48,559	
^{#}Rankings from AP Poll released prior to game. All times are in Pacific Time.

==== Week 8 ====
Date	Time	Visiting team	Home team	Site	TV	Result	Attendance	Ref.
October 21	12:30 p.m.	**Arizona State**	**Utah**	Rice-Eccles Stadium • Salt Lake City, UT	FS1	**ASU** 30–10	45,863	
October 21	1:00 p.m.	**Oregon**	**UCLA**	Rose Bowl • Pasadena, CA	P12N	**UCLA** 31–14	55,711	
October 21	4:30 p.m.	No. 11 **USC**	No. 13 Notre Dame	Notre Dame Stadium • South Bend, IN (Jeweled Shillelagh)	NBC	**L** 14–49	77,622	
October 21	5:00 p.m.	**Arizona**	**California**	California Memorial Stadium • Berkeley, CA	P12N	**ARZ** 45–44^{2OT}	37,525	
October 21	7:45 p.m.	**Colorado**	No. 15 **Washington State**	Martin Stadium • Pullman, WA	ESPN	**WSU** 28–0	31,461	
^{#}Rankings from AP Poll released prior to game. All times are in Pacific Time.

Date	Bye Week		
October 21	Oregon State	Stanford	Washington

==== Week 9 ====
Date	Time	Visiting team	Home team	Site	TV	Result	Attendance	Ref.
October 26	6:00 p.m.	No. 20 **Stanford**	**Oregon State**	Reser Stadium • Corvallis, OR	ESPN	**STAN** 15–14	30,912	
October 28	11:00 a.m.	**California**	**Colorado**	Folsom Field • Boulder, CO	P12N	**COLO** 44–28	47,216	
October 28	12:30 p.m.	**UCLA**	No. 12 **Washington**	Husky Stadium • Seattle, WA	ABC	**WASH** 44–23	69,847	
October 28	2:45 p.m.	**Utah**	**Oregon**	Autzen Stadium • Eugene, OR	P12N	**ORE** 41–20	56,154	
October 28	6:30 p.m.	No. 15 **Washington State**	**Arizona**	Arizona Stadium • Tucson, AZ	P12N	**ARZ** 58–37	42,822	
October 28	7:45 p.m.	No. 21 **USC**	**Arizona State**	Sun Devil Stadium • Tempe, AZ	ESPN	**USC** 48–17	53,446	
^{#}Rankings from AP Poll released prior to game. All times are in Pacific Time.

==== Week 10 ====
Date	Time	Visiting team	Home team	Site	TV	Result	Attendance	Ref.
November 3	6:30 p.m.	**UCLA**	**Utah**	Rice-Eccles Stadium • Salt Lake City, UT	FS1	**UTAH** 48–17	45,902	
November 4	12:30 p.m.	No. 18 **Stanford**	**Washington State**	Martin Stadium • Pullman, WA	FOX	**WSU** 24–21	32,952	
November 4	2:00 p.m.	**Oregon State**	**California**	California Memorial Stadium • Berkeley, CA	P12N	**CAL** 37–23	35,440	
November 4	6:00 p.m.	**Colorado**	**Arizona State**	Sun Devil Stadium • Tempe, AZ	P12N	**ASU** 41–30	44,553	
November 4	7:00 p.m.	**Oregon**	No. 12 **Washington**	Husky Stadium • Seattle, WA	FS1	**WASH** 38–3	70,572	
November 4	7:45 p.m.	No. 23 **Arizona**	No. 17 **USC**	LA Memorial Coliseum • Los Angeles, CA	ESPN	**USC** 49–35	70,225	
^{#}Rankings from AP Poll released prior to game. All times are in Pacific Time.

==== Week 11 ====
Date	Time	Visiting team	Home team	Site	TV	Result	Attendance	Ref.
November 10	7:30 p.m.	No. 9 **Washington**	**Stanford**	Stanford Stadium • Stanford, CA	FS1	**STAN** 30–22	44,589	
November 11	1:00 p.m.	No. 14 **USC**	**Colorado**	Folsom Field • Boulder, CO	FOX	**USC** 38–24	49,337	
November 11	2:30 p.m.	No. 19 **Washington State**	**Utah**	Rice-Eccles Stadium • Salt Lake City, UT	P12N	**WSU** 33–25	45,826	
November 11	6:30 p.m.	**Arizona State**	**UCLA**	Rose Bowl • Pasadena, CA	P12N	**UCLA** 44–37	53,847	
November 11	7:00 p.m.	**Oregon State**	**Arizona**	Arizona Stadium • Tucson, AZ	ESPN2	**ARZ** 49–28	40,984	
^{#}Rankings from AP Poll released prior to game. All times are in Pacific Time.

Date	Bye Week	
November 11	California	Oregon

==== Week 12 ====
Date	Time	Visiting team	Home team	Site	TV	Result	Attendance	Ref.
November 18	12:00 p.m.	**Arizona State**	**Oregon State**	Reser Stadium • Corvallis, OR	P12N	**ASU** 40–24	36,063	
November 18	4:00 p.m.	**Arizona**	**Oregon**	Autzen Stadium • Eugene, OR	P12N	**ORE** 48–28	51,799	
November 18	5:00 p.m.	**California**	No. 20 **Stanford**	Stanford Stadium • Stanford, CA (119th Big Game/Stanford Axe)	FOX	**STAN** 17–14	51,424	
November 18	5:00 p.m.	**UCLA**	No. 12 **USC**	LA Memorial Coliseum • Los Angeles, CA (Victory Bell)	ABC	**USC** 28–23	82,407	
November 18	7:30 p.m.	**Utah**	No. 16 **Washington**	Husky Stadium • Seattle, WA	ESPN	**WASH** 33–30	65,767	
^{#}Rankings from AP Poll released prior to game. All times are in Pacific Time.

Date	Bye Week	
November 18	Colorado	Washington State

==== Week 13 ====
Date	Time	Visiting team	Home team	Site	TV	Result	Attendance	Ref.
November 24	7:30 p.m.	**California**	**UCLA**	Rose Bowl • Pasadena, CA (California–UCLA rivalry)	FS1	**UCLA** 30–27	50,287	
November 25	1:30 p.m.	**Arizona**	**Arizona State**	Sun Devil Stadium • Tempe, AZ (Territorial Cup)	P12N	**ASU** 42–30	59,385	
November 25	4:00 p.m.	**Oregon State**	**Oregon**	Autzen Stadium • Eugene, OR (Civil War)	ESPN2	**ORE** 69–10	57,475	
November 25	5:00 pm	No. 14 **Washington State**	No. 15 **Washington**	Husky Stadium • Seattle, WA (Apple Cup)	FOX	**WASH** 41–14	71,265	
November 25	5:00 p.m.	No. 9 Notre Dame	No. 20 **Stanford**	Stanford Stadium • Stanford, CA (Legends Trophy)	ABC	**W** 38–20	47,352	
November 25	7:00 p.m.	**Colorado**	**Utah**	Rice-Eccles Stadium • Salt Lake City, UT (Rumble in the Rockies)	FS1	**UTAH** 34–13	46,022	
^{#}Rankings from AP Poll released prior to game. All times are in Pacific Time.

Date	Bye Week
November 25	USC

=== Championship game ===
The championship game was played on December 1, 2017. It featured the teams with the best conference records from each division, Stanford from the North and USC from the South. This was the seventh championship game and was also a rematch of the 2015 Pac-12 Football Championship Game, the first rematch in the history of the Pac-12 Football Championship Game.

==== Week 14 (Pac-12 Championship Game) ====
Date	Time	Visiting team	Home team	Site	TV	Result	Attendance	Ref.
December 1	5:00 p.m.	No. 14 Stanford	No. 11 **USC**	Levi's Stadium • Santa Clara, CA	ESPN	**USC** 31–28	48,031	
^{#}Rankings from AP Poll released prior to game. All times are in Eastern Time.

== Pac-12 vs other conferences ==
=== Pac-12 vs Power Five matchups ===
This is a list of the power conference teams (ACC, Big 10, Big 12, Notre Dame and SEC), Although not all consider BYU a "Power Five" school, the Pac-12 considers games against BYU as satisfying its "Power Five" scheduling requirement. The Pac-12 plays in the non-conference games. All rankings are from the current AP Poll at the time of the game.

Date	Visitor	Home	Site	Significance	Score
September 1	#8 Washington	Rutgers	High Point Solutions Stadium • Piscataway, NJ		W 30–14
September 2	California	North Carolina	Kenan Memorial Stadium • Chapel Hill, NC		W 35–30
September 3	Texas A&M	UCLA	Rose Bowl • Pasadena, CA		W 45–44
September 9	Nebraska	Oregon	Autzen Stadium • Eugene, OR		W 42–35
September 9	Minnesota	Oregon State	Reser Stadium • Corvallis, OR		L 14–48
September 9	Utah	BYU	LaVell Edwards Stadium • Provo, UT	Holy War	W 19–13
September 16	Arizona State	Texas Tech	Sun Devil Stadium • Tempe, AZ		L 45–52
September 16	Texas	#4 USC	LA Memorial Coliseum • Los Angeles, CA		W 27–24 ^{(2OT)}
September 16	Ole Miss	California	California Memorial Stadium • Berkeley, CA		W 27–16
October 21	#11 USC	#13 Notre Dame	Notre Dame Stadium • South Bend, IN	Notre Dame–USC football rivalry	L 14–49
November 25	#9 Notre Dame	#20 Stanford	Stanford Stadium • Stanford, CA	Notre Dame–Stanford football rivalry	W 38–20
December 26	West Virginia	Utah	Cotton Bowl • Dallas, TX	Zaxby's Heart of Dallas Bowl	W 30–14
December 26	Kansas State	UCLA	Chase Field • Phoenix, AZ	Motel 6 Cactus Bowl	L 17–35
December 27	Purdue	Arizona	Levi Stadium • Santa Clara, CA	Foster Farms Bowl	L 35–38
December 28	#18 Michigan State	#21 Washington State	SDCCU Stadium • San Diego, CA	Holiday Bowl	L 17–42
December 28	#13 TCU	#15 Stanford	Alamodome • San Antonio, TX	Valero Alamo Bowl	L 37–39
December 29	#24 NC State	Arizona State	Sun Bowl • El Paso, TX	Hyundai Sun Bowl	L 31–52
December 29	#5 Ohio State	#8 USC	AT&T Stadium • Arlington, TX	Cotton Bowl	L 7–24
December 30	#9 Penn State	#12 Washington	University of Phoenix Stadium • Glendale, AZ	Fiesta Bowl	L 28–35

=== Records against other conferences ===
2017 records against non-conference foes as of (Nov 25, 2017):

Regular Season

Power 5 Conferences	Record
ACC	1–0
Big Ten	2–1
Big 12	1–1
BYU/Notre Dame	2–1
SEC	2–0
Power 5 Total	8–3
Other FBS Conferences	Record
American	0–2
C-USA	2–0
Independents (Excluding BYU and Notre Dame)	0–0
MAC	1–0
Mountain West	7–3
Sun Belt	2–0
Other FBS Total	12–5
FCS Opponents	Record
Football Championship Subdivision	8–0
Total Non-Conference Record	28–8

Post Season

Power Conferences 5	Record
ACC	0–1
Big Ten	0–4
Big 12	1–2
Power 5 Total	1–7
Other FBS Conferences	Record
Mountain West	0–1
Other FBS Total	0–1
Total Bowl Record	1–8

== Postseason ==
=== Bowl games ===
Legend
Pac-12 win
Pac-12 loss

Bowl game	Date	Site	Television	Time (PST)	Pac-12 team	Opponent	Score	Attendance
Las Vegas Bowl	December 16	Sam Boyd Stadium • Las Vegas, NV	ABC	12:30 p.m.	Oregon	**#25 Boise State**	**L** 28–38	36,432
Zaxby's Heart of Dallas Bowl	December 26	Cotton Bowl • Dallas, TX	ESPN	10:00 a.m.	**Utah**	West Virginia	**W** 30–14	20,507
Motel 6 Cactus Bowl	December 26	Chase Field • Phoenix, AZ	ESPN	6:00 p.m.	UCLA	**Kansas State**	**L** 17–35	32,859
Foster Farms Bowl	December 27	Levi Stadium • Santa Clara, CA	FOX	5:30 p.m.	Arizona	**Purdue**	**L** 35–38	28,436
Holiday Bowl	December 28	SDCCU Stadium • San Diego, CA	FS1	6:00 p.m.	#18 Washington State	**#16 Michigan State**	**L** 17–42	47,092
Valero Alamo Bowl	December 28	Alamodome • San Antonio, TX	ESPN	6:00 p.m.	#13 Stanford	**#15 TCU**	**L** 37–39	57,653
Hyundai Sun Bowl	December 29	Sun Bowl • El Paso, TX	CBS	12:00 p.m.	Arizona State	**#24 NC State**	**L** 31–52	39,897
**New Year's Six Bowls**
Cotton Bowl	December 29	AT&T Stadium • Arlington, TX	ESPN	5:30 p.m.	#8 USC	**#5 Ohio State**	**L** 7–24	67,510
Fiesta Bowl	December 30	University of Phoenix Stadium • Glendale, AZ	ESPN	1:00 p.m.	#12 Washington	**#9 Penn State**	**L** 28–35	61,842

Rankings are from AP Poll. All times Pacific Time Zone.

* Rankings based on CFP rankings, Pac-12 team is bolded

Selection of teams: Arizona, Arizona State, Oregon, Stanford, UCLA, USC, Utah, Washington, Washington State (9)

== Awards and honors ==
=== Player of the week honors ===
Following each week's games, Pac-12 conference officials select the players of the week from the conference's teams.

Week	Offensive			Defensive			Special teams		
Week	Player	Position	Team	Player	Position	Team	Player	Position	Team
Week 1 (Sept. 2)	Josh Rosen	QB	UCLA	Devante Downs	LB	California	Jake Olson	LS	USC
Week 2 (Sept. 9)	Sam Darnold	QB	USC	Peyton Pelluer	LB	Washington State	Dante Pettis	WR/PR	Washington
Week 3 (Sept. 16)	Luke Falk	QB	Washington State	Devante Downs (2)	LB	California	Dante Pettis (2)	WR/PR	Washington
Week 4 (Sept. 23)	Bryce Love	RB	Stanford	Jack Jones	CB	USC	Brandon Ruiz	PK	ASU
Week 5 (Sept. 30)	Bryce Love (2)	RB	Stanford	Jahad Woods	LB	Washington State	Erik Powell	PK	Washington State
Week 6 (Oct. 7)	Khalil Tate	QB	Arizona	Justin Reid	DB	Stanford	Erik Powell (2)	PK	Washington State
Week 7 (Oct. 14)	Khalil Tate (2)	QB	Arizona	Jordan Kunaszyk	LB	California	Mitch Wishnowsky	P	Utah
Week 8 (Oct. 21)	Khalil Tate (3)	QB	Arizona	Colin Schooler	LB	Arizona	Brandon Ruiz (2)	PK	ASU
Week 9 (Oct. 28)	Khalil Tate (4)	QB	Arizona	Harrison Phillips	DL	Stanford	Lucas Havrisik	PK	Arizona
Week 10 (Nov. 4)	Luke Falk (2)	QB	Washington State	Manase Hungalu	LB	Oregon State	Dante Pettis (3)	WR/PR	Washington
Week 11 (Nov. 11)	Bryce Love (3)	RB	Stanford	Hercules Mata'afa	DL	Washington State	Erik Powell (3)	K	Washington State
Week 12 (Nov. 18)	Jake Browning	QB	Washington	Troy Dye	LB	Oregon	Michael Pittman Jr.	WR/PR	USC
Week 13 (Nov. 25)	Myles Gaskin	RB	Washington	Kenny Young	LB	UCLA	Jake Bailey	P	Stanford

=== All-Conference teams ===
The following players earned All-Pac-12 honors.

First Team

Position	Player	Class	Team
First Team Offense
QB	Sam Darnold	RSo.	USC
RB	Ronald Jones II	Jr.	USC
RB	Bryce Love	Jr.	Stanford
WR	N'Keal Harry	So.	Arizona State
WR	Dante Pettis	Sr.	Washington
TE	Dalton Schultz	Sr.	Stanford
OL	Tyrell Crosby	Sr.	Oregon
OL	Nate Herbig	So.	Stanford
OL	Kaleb McGary	Jr.	Washington
OL	Cody O'Connell	RSr.	Washington State
OL	Coleman Shelton	Sr.	Washington
First Team Defense
DL	Rasheem Green	Jr.	USC
DL	Hercules Mata'afa	RJr.	Washington State
DL	Harrison Phillips	Sr.	Stanford
DL	Vita Vea	Jr.	Washington
LB	Uchenna Nwosu	Sr.	USC
LB	Cameron Smith	Jr.	USC
LB	Kenny Young	Sr.	UCLA
DB	Isaiah Oliver	Jr.	Colorado
DB	Taylor Rapp	So.	Washington
DB	Justin Reid	Jr.	Stanford
DB	Marvell Tell	Jr.	USC
First Team Special Teams
PK	Matt Gay	Jr.	Utah
P	Mitch Wishnowsky	Jr.	Utah
RT	Dante Pettis	Sr.	Washington
ST	Brenden Schooler	So.	Oregon
ST	Michael Pittman Jr.	So.	USC

Second Team

Position	Player	Class	Team
Second Team Offense
QB	Josh Rosen	Jr.	UCLA
RB	Royce Freeman	Sr.	Oregon
RB	Myles Gaskin	Jr.	Washington
WR	Deontay Burnett	Jr.	USC
WR	Darren Carrington II	Sr.	Utah
TE	Will Dissly	Sr.	Washington
OL	David Bright	RSr.	Stanford
OL	Toa Lobendahn	RJr.	USC
OL	Cole Madison	RSr.	Washington State
OL	Kolton Miller	RJr.	UCLA
OL	Salesi Uhatafe	Sr.	Utah
Second Team Defense
DL	Greg Gaines	Jr.	Washington
DL	Jalen Jelks	RJr.	Oregon
DL	Christian Rector	RSo.	USC
DL	JoJo Wicker	Jr.	Arizona State
LB	Keishawn Bierria	Sr.	Washington
LB	Ben Burr-Kirven	Jr.	Washington
LB	Troy Dye	So.	Oregon
DB	Julian Blackmon	So.	Utah
DB	Chase Lucas	RFr.	Arizona State
DB	Jojo McIntosh	Jr.	Washington
DB	Quenton Meeks	Jr.	Stanford
DB	Jalen Thompson	So.	Washington State
DB	Jaleel Wadood	Sr.	UCLA
Second Team Special Teams
PK	Erik Powell	RSr.	Washington State
P	Jake Bailey	Jr.	Stanford
RT	Boobie Hobbs	Sr.	Utah
ST	Matt Lopes	RSr.	USC

Honorable mentions

- ARIZONA: OL Jacob Alsadek, RSr.; RS Shun Brown Jr.; OL Nate Eldridge, So.; LB Colin Schooler, Fr.; QB Khalil Tate, So.; RB Nick Wilson Sr.
- ARIZONA STATE: DB Chad Adams Sr..; LB DJ Calhoun Sr.; OL Sam Jones, RJr.; RB Demario Richard Sr.; LB Christian Sam, Jr.; DL Tashon Smallwood Sr.; QB Manny Wilkins, Jr.
- CALIFORNIA: LB Devante Downs, Sr.; RB Patrick Laird, Jr.; DL James Looney, Sr.; OL Patrick Mekari Jr.
- COLORADO: LB Rick Gamboa Jr.; OL Jeromy Irwin Sr.; RB Phillip Lindsay, Sr.; QB Steven Montez, So.; DB Evan Worthington, Jr.
- OREGON: DB Ugo Amadi Jr.; TE Jake Breeland, RSo.; OL Jake Hanson, RSo.; DB Arrion Springs Sr.; OL Calvin Throckmorton, So.
- OREGON STATE: LB Manase Hungalu, RSr.; DB David Morris, Fr.
- STANFORD: OL Jesse Burkett Sr.; OL A.T. Hall Sr.; OL Walker Little, Fr.; LB Bobby Okereke, Sr.; RS Cameron Scarlett Jr.; AP/ST Brandon Simmons Sr.; PK Jet Toner, So.; WR J. J. Arcega-Whiteside, Jr.
- UCLA: WR Darren Andrews, RSr.; WR Jordan Lasley, RJr.; OL Scott Quessenberry, RSr.; OL Najee Toran Sr.; DL Jacob Tuioti-Mariner Sr.
- USC: OL Chris Brown, RJr.; TB Stephen Carr, Fr.; DL Josh Fatu Sr.; DB Chris Hawkins, RSr.; DB Iman Marshall, Jr.; WR Steven Mitchell Jr., RSr.; TE Tyler Petite Jr.; DL Brandon Pili, Fr.; TB Tyler Vaughns, RFr.
- UTAH: OL Lo Falemaka Sr.; LB Kavika Luafatasaga Sr.; DL Lowell Lotulelei Sr.; DL Filipo Mokofisi Sr.
- WASHINGTON: TB Salvon Ahmed, Fr.; LB Tevis Bartlett Jr.; QB Jake Browning, Jr.; DB Myles Bryant, So.; OL Nick Harris, So.
- WASHINGTON STATE: OL Andre Dillard, RJr.; QB Luke Falk, RSr.; LB Frankie Luvu, Sr.; RB Jamal Morrow, RSr.

=== Pac-12 individual awards ===
The following individuals won the Pac-12 conference's annual player and coach awards:

Pac-12 Offensive Player of the Year

Bryce Love, Stanford

Pac-12 Defensive Player of the Year

Vita Vea, Washington

Pac-12 Coach of the Year

David Shaw, Stanford

Pac-12 Offensive Freshman Player of the Year

J. J. Taylor, Arizona and Walker Little, Stanford

Pac-12 Defensive Freshman Player of the Year

Colin Schooler, Arizona

Pac-12 Scholar Athlete Player of the Year

Matt Anderson, California

=== All-Americans ===
The following Pac-12 players were named to the 2017 College Football All-America Team by the Walter Camp Football Foundation (WCFF), Associated Press (AP), Football Writers Association of america (FWAA), Sporting News (SN), and American Football Coaches Association (AFCA):

Academic All-America Team Member of the Year (CoSIDA):

=== All-Academic ===
First team

Pos.	Name	School	Yr.	GPA	Major
QB	Justin Herbert	Oregon	Sophomore	4.08	Biology
RB	Patrick Laird	California	RSJr.	3.51	Business Administration; Political Science
RB	Nick Ralston	Arizona State (2)	RSSo.	4.00	Finance
WR	John Gardner	Washington	RSJr.	3.54	Mathematics
WR	Timmy Hernandez	Oregon State	Junior	3.74	Mechanical Engineering
TE	Harrison Handley	Utah	Senior	3.63	Educational Leadership and Policy
OL	Christian Boettcher	Arizona	Senior	3.60	Biochemistry
OL	Johnny Capra	Utah	Sophomore	3.96	Communication
OL	Isaac Miller	Colorado	RSSo.	3.77	Integrative Physiology & Psychology
OL	Calvin Throckmorton	Oregon (2)	RSSo.	3.76	Human Physiology
OL	Nick Wilson	Stanford (2)	Junior	3.62	Mechanical Engineering
DL	Nick Heninger	Utah	RSFr.	3.93	Undeclared/Pre-Dentistry
DL	Dylan Jackson	Stanford (2)	Junior	3.30	Political Science
DL	Harrison Phillips	Stanford (2)	Senior	3.34	Science, Technology and Society; Sociology
DL	Pita Tonga	Utah	RSFr.	3.56	Undeclared
LB	Tevis Bartlett	Washington (2)	Junior	3.65	Education, Community & Organizations
LB	Ben Burr-Kirven	Washington (2)	Junior	3.58	Comparative Literature, Cinema and Media Studies
LB	Derek McCartney	Colorado	Gr.	3.71	Integrative Physiology
DB	Terrell Burgess	Utah	Sophomore	3.59	Undeclared
DB	Malcolm Holland	Arizona (2)	Sophomore	3.44	Pre-Business
DB	Taylor Rapp	Washington	Sophomore	3.66	Business
DB	Luke Rubenzer	California	Senior	3.24	Business Administration
PK	Van Soderberg	Washington	RSFr.	3.91	Pre-Engineering
P	Mitch Wishnowsky	Utah	Junior	3.40	Kinesiology Teaching
ST	Richard McNitzky	Stanford	Sophomore	3.88	Undeclared

Second team

Pos.	Name	School	Yr.	GPA	Major
QB	Jake Browning	Washington	Junior	3.37	Business (Finances)
RB	Ryan Nall	Oregon State	RSJr.	3.41	Speech Communication
RB	Cameron Scarlett	Stanford	Junior	3.30	Science, Technology and Technology
WR	Brandon Arconado	Washington State	RSSo.	3.38	Undeclared
WR	Demari Simpkins	Utah	Sophomore	3.23	Communication
TE	Dalton Schultz	Stanford	Senior	3.43	Science, Technology and Society
OL	Jesse Burkett	Stanford (2)	Senior	3.50	Japanese; Symbolic Systems
OL	Jake Curhan	California	RSFr.	3.51	Undeclared
OL	Devery Hamilton	Stanford	Sophomore	3.47	Undeclared
OL	Darrin Paulo	Utah	So.	3.44	Economics
OL	Luke Wattenberg	Washington	RSFr.	3.36	Pre-Engineering
DL	Greg Gaines	Washington (2)	Junior	3.25	Extended Pre-Major
DL	Tony Mekari	California	RSSr.	3.24	Legal Studies
DL	Levi Onwuzurike	Washington	RSFr.	3.36	Pre-Arts & Sciences
DL	Jovan Swann	Stanford	Sophomore	3.25	Undeclared
LB	Peyton Pelluer	Washington State (2)	RSSr.	3.36	Humanities
LB	Casey Toohill	Stanford (2)	Junior	3.68	Political Science
LB	Josh Woods	UCLA	Junior	3.33	Sociology
DB	Frank Buncom	Stanford (2)	Sophomore	3.23	Human Biology
DB	Treyjohn Butler	Stanford	Sophomore	3.31	Undeclared
DB	Alijah Holder	Stanford	Senior	3.19	Science, Technology and Society
DB	Justin Reid	Stanford	Junior	3.15	Management Science and Engineering
PK	Matt Anderson	California (2)	GR.	3.56	Cultural Sport in Education
P	Jake Glatting	Arizona	RSJr.	3.45	Industrial Engineering
ST	Connor Haller	Utah	RSFr.	3.86	Pre-Business

Honorable mentions: ARIZ: Leon Branden, Jamie Nunley, Josh Pollack, Khalil Tate; ASU: Mitchell Fraboni, Tommy Hudson, Connor Humphreys, Malik Lawal, Alex Losoya, A.J. McCollum, Michael Sleep-Dalton, Tashon Smallwood, Kyle Williams; CAL: Jordan Kunaszyk, Demetris Robertson, Gabe Siemieniec, Russ Ude; COLO: Lucas Cooper, George Frazier, Aaron Haigler, Michael Mathewes; ORE: Taylor Alie, Kaulana Apelu, Gary Baker, Brady Breeze, Jacob Breeland, Doug Brenner, Jacob Capra, Drayton Carlberg, Jake Hanson, Shane Lemieux, Malik Lovette, Cam McCormick; OSU: Blake Brandel, Jordan Choukair, Summer Houston, Andrzejh Hughes-Murray, Nous Keobounnam, Trent Moore, Artavis Pierce, Nick Porebski, Tuli Wily-Matagi; STAN: Joey Alfieri, Malik Antoine, Jake Bailey, Isaiah Brandt-Sims, David Bright, Keller Chryst, K. J. Costello, Obi Eboh, Ben Edwards, Scooter Harrington, Nate Herbig, Trenton Irwin, Peter Kalambayi, Quenton Meeks, Alameen Murphy, Kevin Palma, Kaden Smith, Donald Stewart, Jet Toner, Jay Tyler, Mike Tyler; UCLA: Michael Alves, Johnny Den Bleyker, Giovanni Gentosi, Theo Howard, Nate Meadors, Marcus Moore, Christian Pabico, Josh Rosen, Jordan Wilson, Alex Whittingham, Kenny Young; USC: Jordan Austin, Wyatt Schmidt; UTAH: Julian Blackmon, Devonta’e Henry-Cole, Hayes Hicken, Casey Hughes, Tyler Huntley, Jake Jackson, Troy Williams; WASH: A.J. Carty, Sean Constantine, Will Dissly, Coleman Shelton, Nick Harris, Drew Sample, Vita Vea, Tristan Vizcaino; WSU: Nick Begg, Tristan Brock, Kyle Celli, Taylor Comfort, Isaac Dotson, Luke Falk, Dezmon Patmon, Trey Tinsley.

=== National award winners ===
- Bryce Love

Doak Walker Award

== Home game attendance ==
Team	Stadium	Capacity	Game 1	Game 2	Game 3	Game 4	Game 5	Game 6	Game 7	Total	Average	% of Capacity
Arizona	Arizona Stadium	55,675	43,620	43,334	36,651	48,380†	42,822	40,984	—	257,629	42,938	77.12%
Arizona State	Sun Devil Stadium	57,078	46,596	54,336	50,110	51,234	53,446	44,553	**59,385†**	359,660	51,380	90.02%
California	California Memorial Stadium	62,467	36,209	37,125	46,747†	26,244	37,525	35,440	—	219,290	36,548	58.51%
Colorado	Folsom Field	50,183	43,822	44,318	47,666	49,976†	47,216	49,337	—	282,335	47,056	93.77%
Oregon	Autzen Stadium	54,000	52,204	**58,389†**	**55,707**	**56,653**	**56,154**	51,799	**57,475**	388,381	**55,483**	102.75%
Oregon State	Reser Stadium	45,674	34,737	35,206	37,821†	33,785	30,912	36,063	—	208,524	34,754	76.09%
Stanford	Stanford Stadium	50,424	48,042	44,422	48,559	44,589	**51,424†**	47,352	—	284,388	47,398	94.00%
UCLA	Rose Bowl	92,542	64,635†	50,444	61,338	55,711	53,847	50,287	—	336,262	56,044	60.56%
USC	Los Angeles Memorial Coliseum	93,607	61,125	77,614	84,714†	60,314	72,382	70,225	82,407	508,781	72,683	77.65%
Utah	Rice-Eccles Stadium	45,807	**45,905**	**45,881**	**45,991**	**45,863**	**45,902**	**45,826**	**46,022†**	321,390	**45,913**	100.23%
Washington	Husky Stadium	70,083	68,491	68,384	67,429	69,847	70,572	65,767	**71,265†**	481,755	68,822	98.20%
Washington State	Martin Stadium	32,952	30,254	32,631	32,487	30,317	**33,773†**	31,461	32,952	223,875	31,982	97.06%

Bold – Exceed capacity
†Season High

Attendance for neutral site games:

- August 27 - Stanford vs. Rice, 33,101
- September 1 – Colorado vs. Colorado State, 73,932
