= 2017 Fiesta Bowl =

2017 PlayStation Fiesta Bowl
- CFP New Year’s Six; 47th Fiesta Bowl
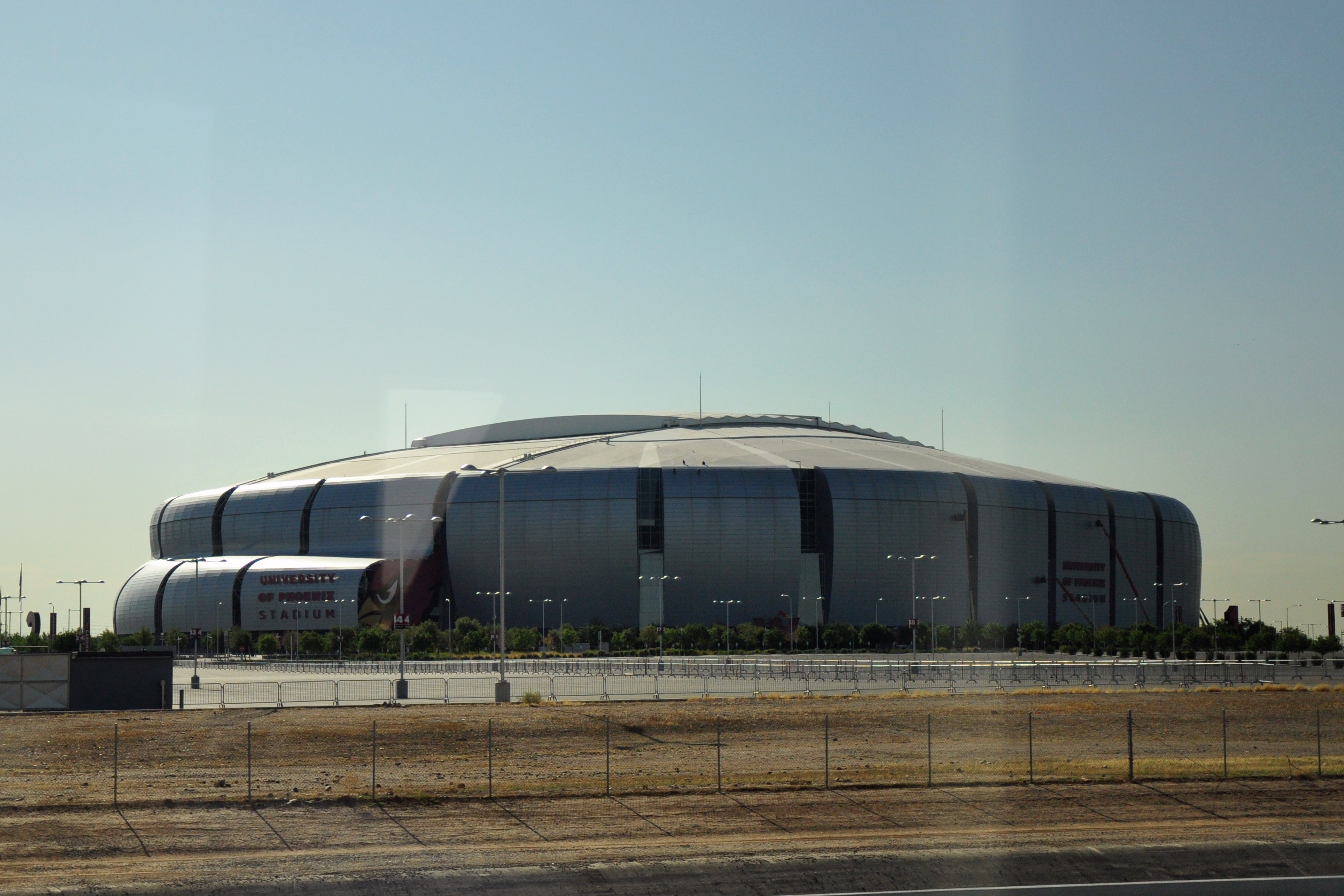
- University of Phoenix Stadium in Glendale, Arizona, hosted the Fiesta Bowl.
Washington Huskies	Penn State Nittany Lions
(10–2)	(10–2)
Pac-12	Big Ten
28	35
Head coach: Chris Petersen	Head coach: James Franklin
AP / Coaches / CFP; 12 / 12 / 11	AP / Coaches / CFP; 9 / 9 / 9
	1	2	3	4	Total
Washington	0	14	7	7	28
Penn State	14	14	7	0	35
- Date: December 30, 2017
- Season: 2017
- Stadium: University of Phoenix Stadium
- Location: Glendale, Arizona
- MVP: Offense: Trace McSorley Defense: Marcus Allen
- Favorite: Penn State by 3
- Referee: Mike Defee (Big XII)
- Halftime show: Bands from participants
- Attendance: 61,842

United States TV coverage
- Network: ESPN & ESPN Radio
- Announcers: Dave Pasch, Greg McElroy, and Tom Luginbill (ESPN); Bill Rosinski, David Norrie, Ian Fitzsimmons (ESPN Radio)

The 2017 Fiesta Bowl was a college football bowl game played on December 30, 2017, at University of Phoenix Stadium in Glendale, Arizona. The 47th Fiesta Bowl was one of the 2017–18 bowl games concluding the 2017 FBS football season.

The game was televised on ESPN and ESPN Deportes, and broadcast on ESPN Radio and XM Satellite Radio, with the kickoff set for 4:00 p.m. ET (2 p.m. MT). The game's title sponsor was Sony Interactive Entertainment via its PlayStation brand as part of a multi-year deal with broadcasting and marketing rightsholder ESPN, which includes branded content and making PlayStation the official video gaming and virtual reality sponsor of the College Football Playoff; the game is officially known as the PlayStation Fiesta Bowl.

== Teams ==
The two participants for the game were the Penn State Nittany Lions of the Big Ten Conference and the Washington Huskies of the Pac-12 Conference.

This was only the third time that Penn State and Washington played each other, and the Nittany Lions had won both previous meetings. The most recent game was 34 years earlier in Honolulu at the 1983 Aloha Bowl, where Penn State defeated the Huskies 13–10. The first meeting was in 1921, where Penn State defeated the Washington Sun Dodgers 21–7 on December 3 in Seattle.

The Nittany Lions had appeared in six previous Fiesta Bowls: 1977, 1980, 1982, 1987, 1992, and 1997, winning all six. This was the Huskies' first Fiesta Bowl appearance.

=== Penn State ===
The Nittany Lions entered the game with a 10–2 record, with their two losses coming in conference play in consecutive weeks by a combined four points at #6 Ohio State and at #24 Michigan State.

=== Line ===
Penn State was favored by 3 points when the game kicked off.

== Game summary ==
=== Scoring summary ===
Scoring summary

Quarter	Time	Drive			Team	Scoring information	Score	
Quarter	Time	Plays	Yards	TOP	Team	Scoring information	WASH	PSU
1	11:10	8	83	3:50	PSU	DaeSean Hamilton 48-yard touchdown reception from Trace McSorley, Tyler Davis kick good	0	7
1	1:34	11	64	5:12	PSU	Saquon Barkley 2-yard touchdown run, Tyler Davis kick good	0	14
2	14:57	4	75	1:37	WASH	Jake Browning 1-yard touchdown run, Tristan Vizcaino kick good	7	14
2	11:59	7	76	2:58	PSU	Miles Sanders 1-yard touchdown run, Tyler Davis kick good	7	21
2	9:01	2	93	0:44	PSU	Saquon Barkley 92-yard touchdown run, Tyler Davis kick good	7	28
2	4:15	6	33	2:26	WASH	Myles Gaskin 13-yard touchdown run, Tristan Vizcaino kick good	14	28
3	9:57	13	80	5:03	WASH	Aaron Fuller 28-yard touchdown reception from Jake Browning, Tristan Vizcaino kick good	21	28
3	5:59	8	70	3:58	PSU	DaeSean Hamilton 24-yard touchdown reception from Trace McSorley, Tyler Davis kick good	21	35
4	6:52	3	78	1:14	WASH	Miles Gaskin 69-yard touchdown run, Tristan Vizcaino kick good	28	35
"TOP" = time of possession. For other American football terms, see Glossary of American football.							28	35

=== Statistics ===
	1	2	3	4	Total
Huskies	0	14	7	7	28
Nittany Lions	14	14	7	0	35

Statistics	WASH	PSU
First downs	14	25
Plays–yards	55–331	78–554
Rushes–yards	26–104	36–212
Passing yards	227	342
Passing: Comp–Att–Int	19–29–0	32–41–2
Time of possession	24:05	35:55

Team	Category	Player	Statistics
Washington	Passing	Jake Browning	18/28, 175 yds, 1 TD
Washington	Rushing	Myles Gaskin	14 car, 98 yds, 2 TD
Washington	Receiving	Aaron Fuller	6 rec, 61 yds, 1 TD
Penn State	Passing	Trace McSorley	32/41, 342 yds, 2 TD, 2 INT
Penn State	Rushing	Saquon Barkley	18 car, 137 yds, 2 TD
Penn State	Receiving	DaeSean Hamilton	5 rec, 110 yds, 2 TD
