= Vita Vea =

American football player (born 1995)

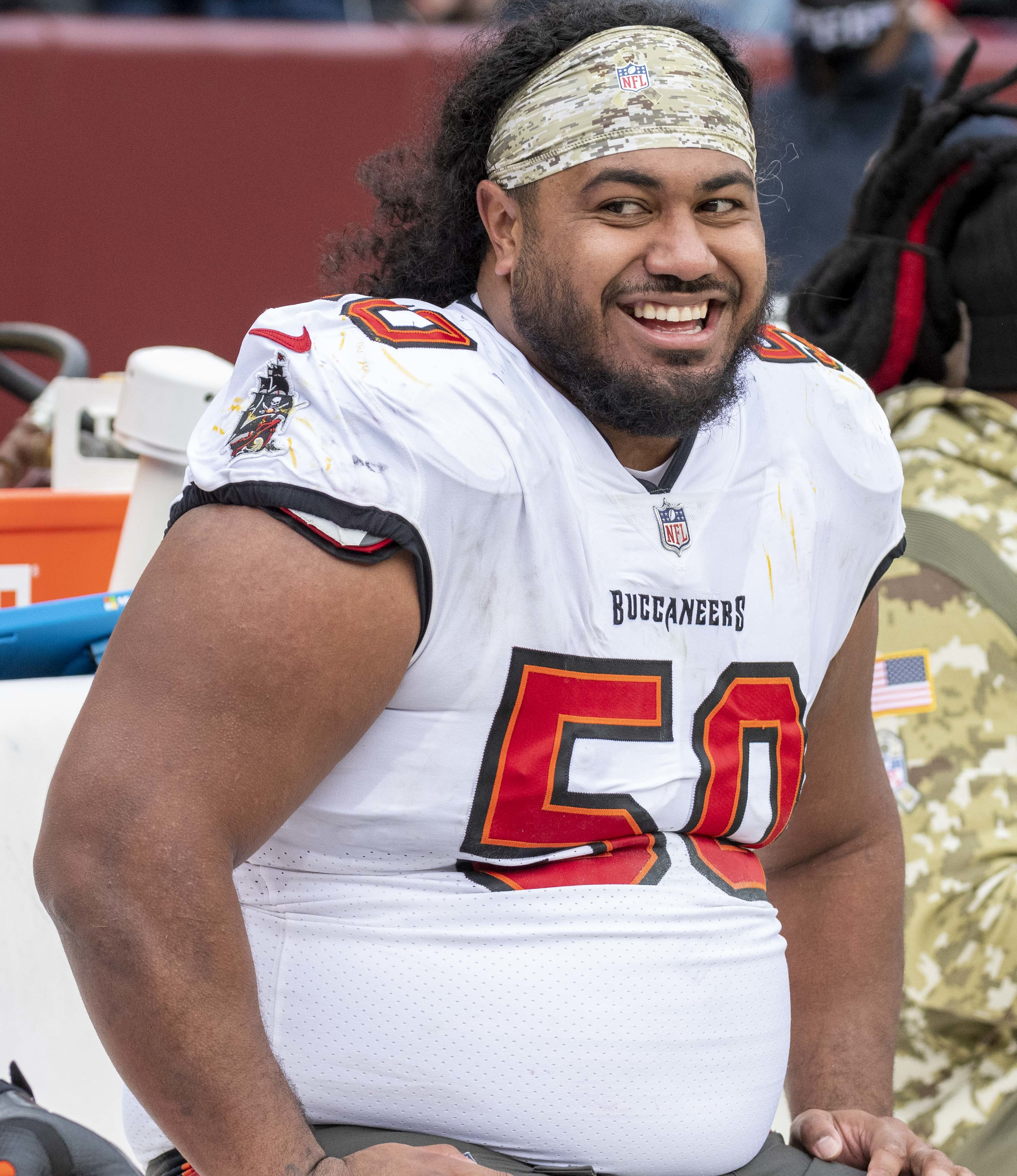
- Vea with the Tampa Bay Buccaneers in 2021

No. 50 – Tampa Bay Buccaneers
- Position: Nose tackle
- Roster status: Active

Personal information
- Born: February 5, 1995 (age 31); Stanford, California, U.S.
- Listed height: 6 ft 4 in (1.93 m)
- Listed weight: 347 lb (157 kg)

Career information
- High school: Milpitas
- College: Washington (2014–2017)
- NFL draft: 2018: 1st round, 12th overall pick

Career history
- Tampa Bay Buccaneers (2018–present)

Awards and highlights
- Super Bowl champion (LV); 2× Pro Bowl (2021, 2024); Pac-12 Defensive Player of the Year (2017); Morris Trophy (2017); First-team All-Pac-12 (2017); Second-team All-Pac-12 (2016)

Career NFL statistics as of Week 6, 2026
- Total tackles: 269
- Sacks: 35
- Forced fumbles: 3
- Fumble recoveries: 3
- Pass deflections: 11
- Stats at Pro Football Reference

Tevita Tuliʻakiʻono Tuipulotu Mosese Vaʻhae Fehoko Faletau "Vita" Vea (born February 5, 1995) is an American professional football nose tackle for the Tampa Bay Buccaneers of the National Football League (NFL). He played college football for the Washington Huskies and was selected by the Buccaneers in the first round of the 2018 NFL draft. Vea won Super Bowl LV with the team over the Kansas City Chiefs, and was selected to his first Pro Bowl the following year.

== College career ==
As a junior in 2017, Vea was the Pac-12 Defensive Player of the Year and won the Morris Trophy. On January 2, 2018, he declared his intention to enter the 2018 NFL draft.

== Professional career ==
=== Pre-draft ===
Vea participated in the 2018 NFL Combine, but did not complete all drills due to a hamstring injury.

Pre-draft measurables
Height	Weight	Arm length	Hand span	Wingspan	40-yard dash	10-yard split	20-yard split	Bench press
6 ft 4 in (1.93 m)	347 lb (157 kg)	32 5/8 in (0.83 m)	10 in (0.25 m)	6 ft 4 1/4 in (1.94 m)	5.10 s	1.77 s	2.95 s	41 reps
All values from NFL Combine

=== 2018 season ===
Vea was selected by the Tampa Bay Buccaneers in the first round with the 12th overall pick in the 2018 NFL draft.

Vea strained his calf during training camp, causing him to miss the entire preseason as well as the first three games of the regular season. Vea recorded his first career sack in Week 10, during a 16–3 loss to the Washington Redskins.

He finished his rookie year with 28 tackles and three sacks.

=== 2019 season ===
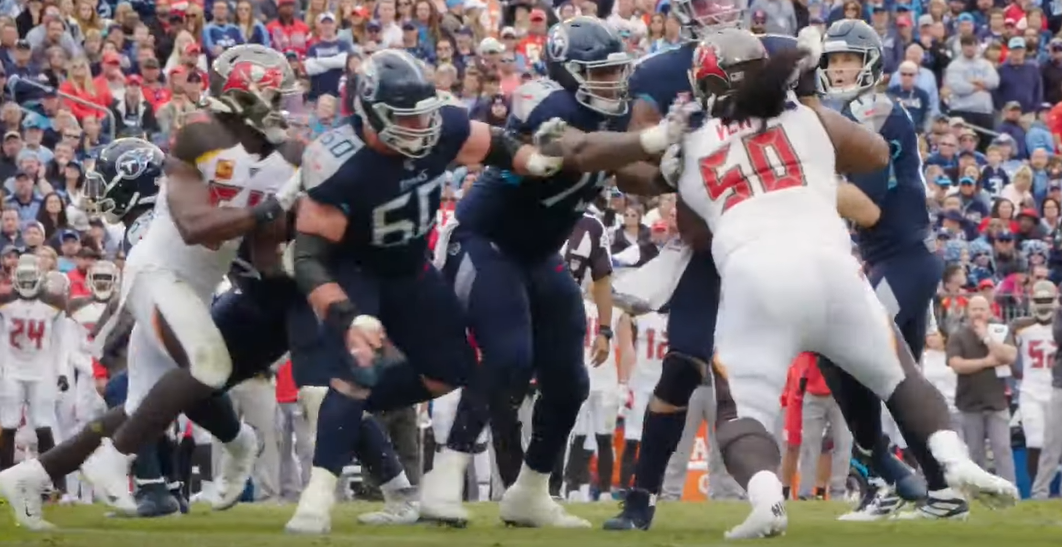
Vea in a game against the Tennessee Titans

In Week 12, during a 35–22 win against the Atlanta Falcons, Vea recorded a sack, a career-best two pass deflections, and a one-yard touchdown catch from quarterback Jameis Winston, becoming the first defensive player since J. J. Watt in 2014 to record a sack and catch a touchdown in the same game, the ninth player in NFL history to accomplish both in the same game, and the heaviest player in NFL history to catch a touchdown at 347 pounds. Overall, he started all 16 games and recorded 35 total tackles, 12 quarterback hits, and three passes defensed.

=== 2020 season ===
During Thursday Night Football against the Chicago Bears in Week 5, Vea suffered fractures to his right leg and ankle after making a tackle on running back David Montgomery. Prior to the injury, Vea recorded one sack on Nick Foles during the 20–19 loss. Vea was placed on injured reserve on October 13, 2020. Vea was placed on the reserve/COVID-19 list by the team on November 28, 2020, and moved back to injured reserve on December 5. Vea was activated from injured reserve on January 22, 2021. In Super Bowl LV, Vea recorded one tackle during the Buccaneers' win over the Kansas City Chiefs.

=== 2021 season ===
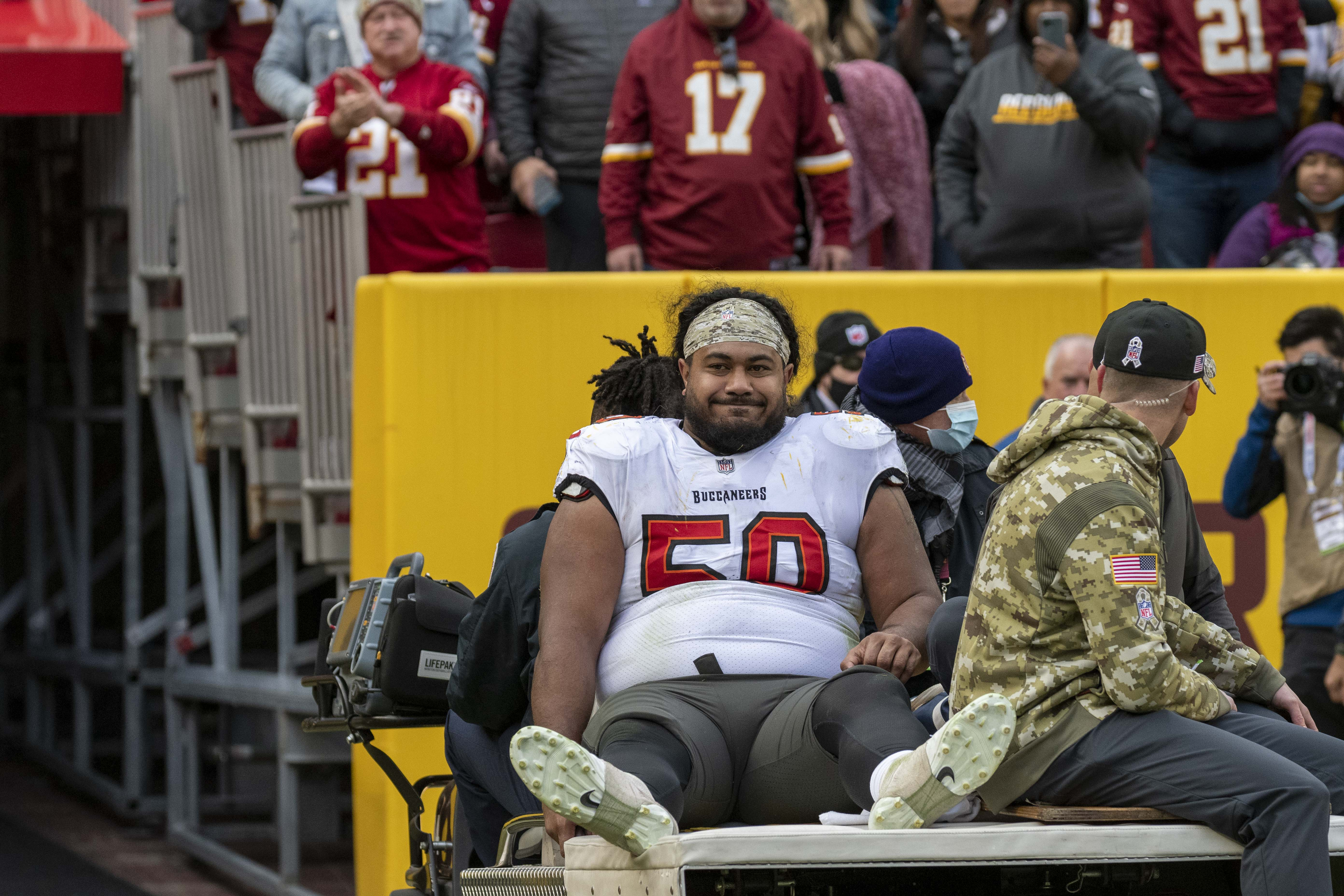
Vea being carted off the field in 2021.

On April 26, 2021, the Buccaneers picked up Vea's fifth-year option, guaranteeing Vea $7.6 million for the 2022 season. In the Week 11 loss to the Washington Football Team, Vea suffered a knee injury in the fourth quarter and was carted off the field.

On January 8, 2022, Vea signed a four-year, $73 million extension with the Buccaneers. As a result of the Los Angeles Rams advancing to Super Bowl LVI, Vea was selected to his first career Pro Bowl as an alternate for defensive tackle Aaron Donald.

=== 2022 season ===
In the 2022 season, Vea appeared in and started 14 games. He finished with 6.5 sacks, 31 total tackles (15 solo), one forced fumble, and one fumble recovery.

=== 2023 season ===
In the 2023 season, Vea appeared in and started 15 games. He finished with 5.5 sacks, 43 total tackles (28 solo) and two forced fumbles. He also served as a team captain in this season.

=== 2024 season ===
BucsNation, a site run by SBNation, noted that Vea was "a force" in the 2024 season. As of Week 15, he led the NFC in Pro Bowl votes for defensive tackles. Up to that time, he notably contributed to his team a career-high nine tackles for loss. His success was also noted by Sports Illustrated, with River Wells noting that Vea has been "particularly nasty" alongside fellow defensive tackle Calijah Kancey.

=== 2026 season ===
On August 19, 2026, Vea signed a one-year, $30 million contract extension after requesting a trade earlier in the summer.

== Career statistics ==
=== NFL ===
Legend
	Won the Super Bowl
**Bold**	Career high

==== Regular season ====
Year	Team	Games		Tackles						Interceptions						Fumbles				Receiving				
Year	Team	GP	GS	Comb	Solo	Ast	TFL	Sack	Sfty	PD	Int	Yds	Avg	Lng	TD	FF	FR	Yds	TD	Rec	Yds	Avg	Long	TD
2018	TB	13	8	28	21	7	4	3.0	0	0	0	0	0.0	0	0	0	0	0	0	0	0	0	0	0
2019	TB	16	16	35	19	16	4	2.5	0	**3**	0	0	0.0	0	0	0	0	0	0	**1**	**1**	**1.0**	**1**	**1**
2020	TB	5	5	10	6	4	3	2.0	0	0	0	0	0.0	0	0	0	0	0	0	0	0	0	0	0
2021	TB	16	16	33	22	11	5	4.0	0	**3**	0	0	0.0	0	0	0	**1**	0	0	0	0	0	0	0
2022	TB	14	14	31	15	16	7	6.5	0	0	0	0	0.0	0	0	1	**1**	0	0	0	0	0	0	0
2023	TB	15	15	**43**	**28**	15	8	5.5	0	0	0	0	0.0	0	0	**2**	0	0	0	0	0	0	0	0
2024	TB	16	16	42	27	15	**10**	**7.0**	0	1	0	0	0.0	0	0	0	0	0	0	0	0	0	0	0
2025	TB	17	17	34	16	**18**	7	4.5	0	2	0	0	0.0	0	0	0	**1**	0	0	0	0	0	0	0
2026	TB	6	6	13	4	9	0	0.0	0	2	0	0	0.0	0	0	0	0	0	0	0	0	0	0	0
Career		118	113	269	158	111	48	35.0	0	11	0	0	0.0	0	0	3	3	0	0	1	1	1.0	1	1

==== Postseason ====
Year	Team	Games		Tackles						Interceptions						Fumbles				Receiving				
Year	Team	GP	GS	Comb	Solo	Ast	TFL	Sack	Sfty	PD	Int	Yds	Avg	Lng	TD	FF	FR	Yds	TD	Rec	Yds	Avg	Long	TD
2020	TB	**2**	0	1	1	0	0	0.0	0	0	0	0	0.0	0	0	0	0	0	0	0	0	0	0	0
2021	TB	**2**	**2**	**4**	**2**	**2**	**1**	**1.0**	0	0	0	0	0.0	0	0	0	0	0	0	0	0	0	0	0
2022	TB	1	1	2	**2**	0	**1**	**1.0**	0	0	0	0	0.0	0	0	0	0	0	0	0	0	0	0	0
2023	TB	**2**	**2**	3	**2**	1	0	0.5	0	0	0	0	0.0	0	0	0	0	0	0	0	0	0	0	0
2024	TB	1	1	1	0	1	0	0.0	0	0	0	0	0.0	0	0	0	0	0	0	0	0	0	0	0
Career		8	6	11	7	4	2	2.5	0	0	0	0	0.0	0	0	0	0	0	0	0	0	0.0	0	0

=== College ===
College statistics
Year	Team	Games	Tackles					Interceptions					Fumbles			
Year	Team	GP	Comb	Solo	Ast	TFL	Sack	PD	Int	Yds	Avg	TD	FF	FR	Yds	TD
2015	Washington	13	17	13	4	3.0	1.0	0	0	0	0	0	1	0	0	0
2016	Washington	14	39	22	17	6.5	5.0	1	0	0	0	0	1	0	0	0
2017	Washington	13	43	30	13	5.5	3.5	4	0	0	0	0	0	0	0	0
Total		37	99	65	34	15.0	9.5	5	0	0	0	0	2	0	0	0

== Personal life ==
Vea is the son of Sione and Fipe Vea, from Tonga. Vea is a second cousin of NFL defensive lineman Junior Fehoko.
