= Keishawn Bierria =

American gridiron football player (born 1995)

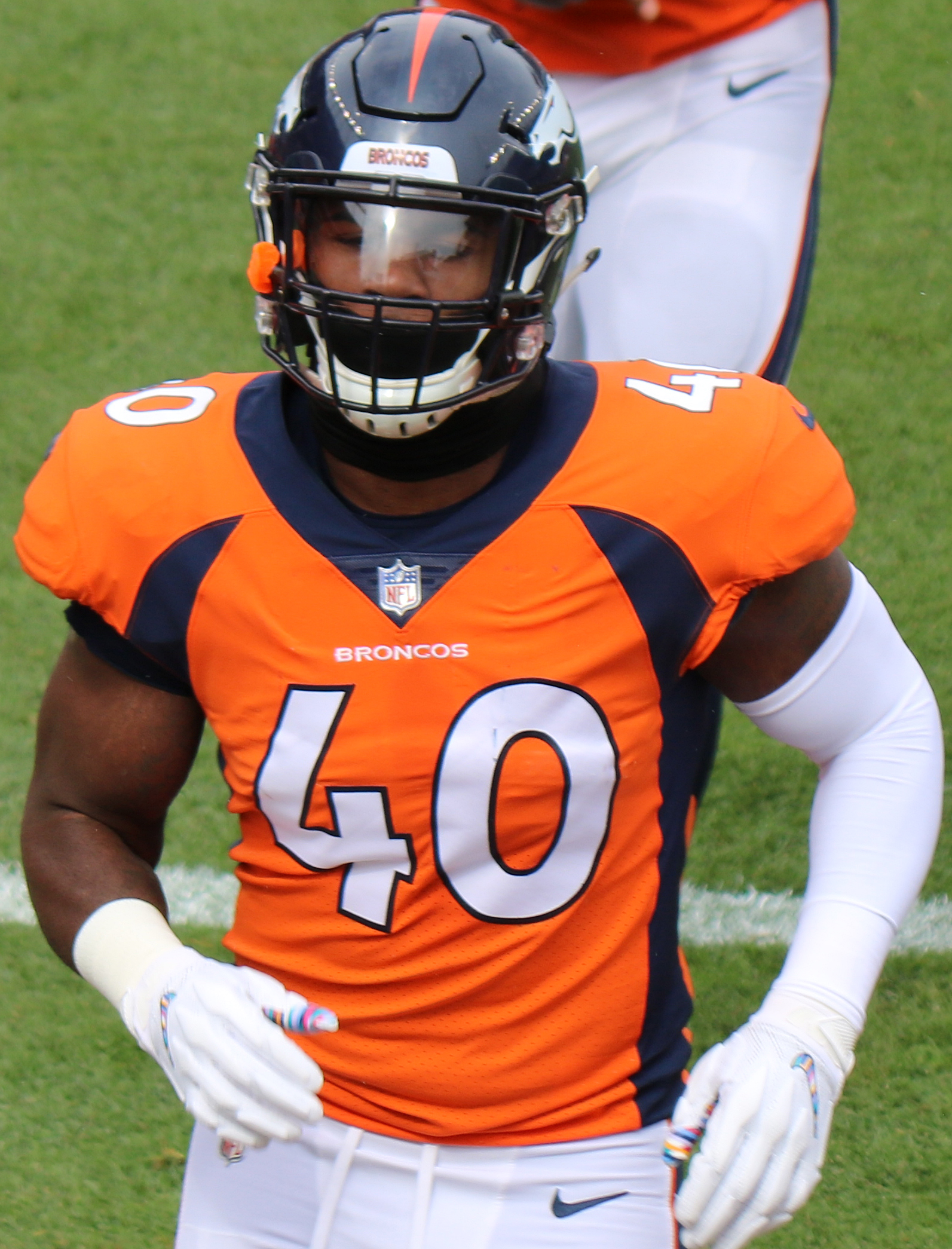
- Bierria with the Denver Broncos in 2018

Profile
- Position: Linebacker

Personal information
- Born: July 26, 1995 (age 31); Carson, California, U.S.
- Listed height: 6 ft 1 in (1.85 m)
- Listed weight: 223 lb (101 kg)

Career information
- High school: Narbonne (Harbor City, California)
- College: Washington (2013–2017)
- NFL draft: 2018: 6th round, 217th overall pick

Career history
- Denver Broncos (2018–2019); Jacksonville Jaguars (2019)*; Arizona Cardinals (2019); Edmonton Elks (2021–2022); Saskatchewan Roughriders (2022); Montreal Alouettes (2022); San Antonio Brahmas (2024)*
- * Offseason or practice squad member only

Awards and highlights
- 2× Second-team All-Pac-12 (2016, 2017)

Career NFL statistics
- Total tackles: 5
- Stats at Pro Football Reference

Keishawn Bierria (born July 26, 1995) is an American professional football linebacker. He played college football at Washington. Bierria was selected by the Denver Broncos in the sixth round of the 2018 NFL draft. He has also been a member of the Jacksonville Jaguars and Arizona Cardinals of the National Football League (NFL); the Edmonton Elks, Saskatchewan Roughriders and Montreal Alouettes of the Canadian Football League (CFL); and the San Antonio Brahmas of the XFL.

== College career ==
Bierria played college football for the Washington Huskies. In his junior year in 2016, he had five fumble recoveries, leading the Football Bowl Subdivision. The following year, Bierria had 60 tackles (four for loss), two forced fumbles, and two fumble recoveries. He was named Second-team All-Pac-12 Conference for the 2016 and 2017 seasons. He finished his four-year collegiate career having played in 54 games for the Huskies, contributing with 242 tackles, 19.5 tackles for loss, eight fumble recoveries, 7.5 sacks, five forced fumbles and four passes defensed.

== Professional career ==
=== Denver Broncos ===
Bierria was selected by the Denver Broncos in the sixth round (217th overall) of the 2018 NFL draft. On October 1, 2019, Bierria was waived by the Broncos.

=== Jacksonville Jaguars ===
On October 29, 2019, Bierria was signed to the practice squad of the Jacksonville Jaguars.

=== Arizona Cardinals ===
On December 18, 2019, Bierria was signed by the Arizona Cardinals off the Jaguars' practice squad. On April 30, 2020, Bierria was released by the Cardinals.

=== Edmonton Elks ===
On February 25, 2021, Bierria was signed by the Edmonton Elks of the Canadian Football League (CFL). In his first season in the CFL, he played in 13 regular season games and contributed with 50 defensive tackles, two quarterback sacks and one interception. Bierria was released by the Elks on February 9, 2022 (the first day of free agency).

=== Saskatchewan Roughriders ===
Bierria signed with the Saskatchewan Roughriders on June 27, 2022. He was released by the Riders on July 30. He played for the team in two games during the 2022 season.

=== Montreal Alouettes ===
On August 7, 2022, Bierria signed a contract with the Montreal Alouettes. This marked his third CFL team in the span of six months.

=== San Antonio Brahmas ===
On December 14, 2023, Bierria signed with the San Antonio Brahmas of the XFL. He was not part of the roster after the 2024 UFL dispersal draft on January 15, 2024.
