= Coleman Shelton =

American football player (born 1995)

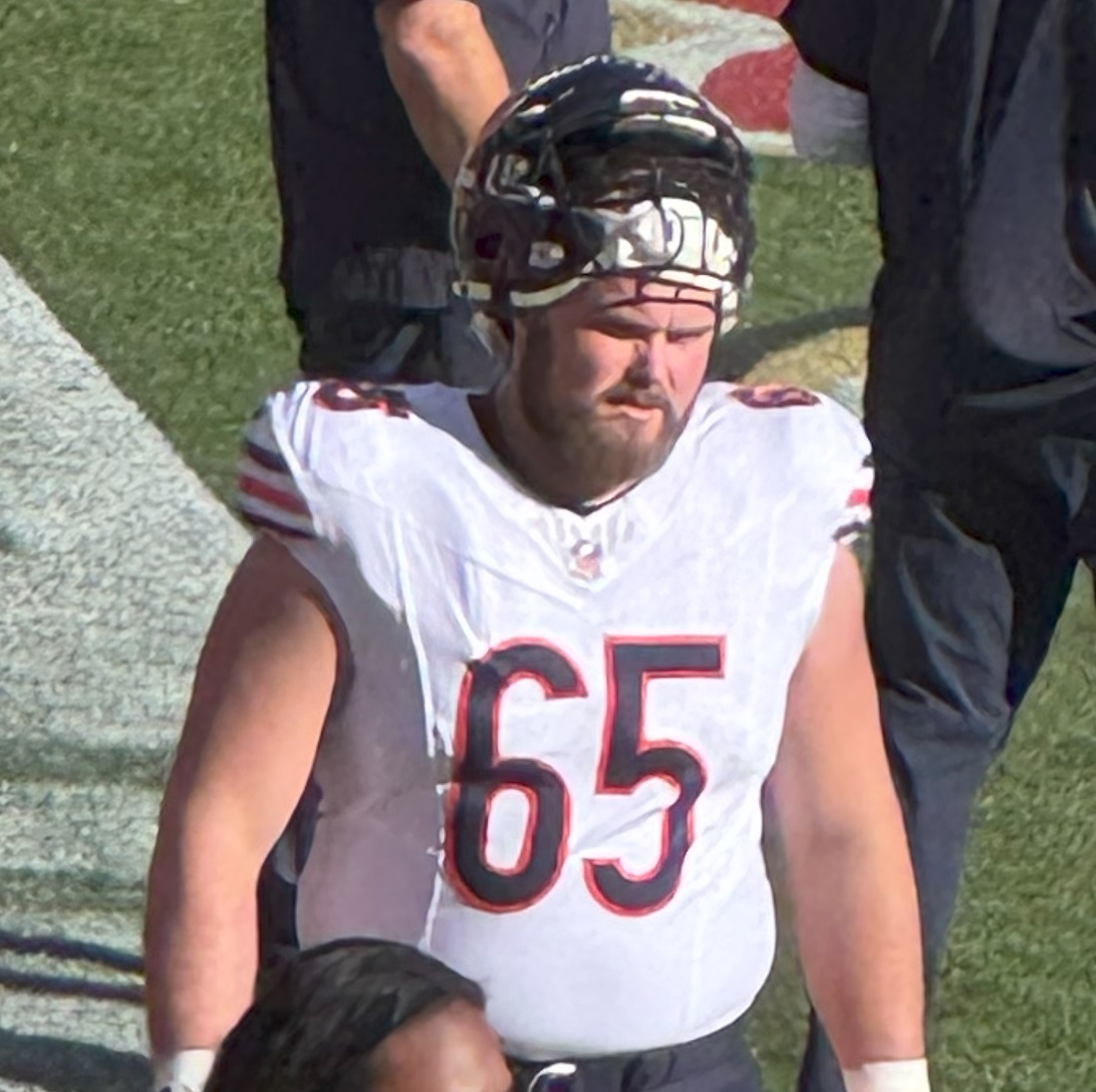
- Shelton with the Chicago Bears in 2024

No. 65 – Los Angeles Rams
- Position: Center
- Roster status: Active

Personal information
- Born: July 28, 1995 (age 31); Los Angeles, California, U.S.
- Listed height: 6 ft 5 in (1.96 m)
- Listed weight: 292 lb (132 kg)

Career information
- High school: Loyola (Los Angeles)
- College: Washington (2013–2017)
- NFL draft: 2018: undrafted

Career history
- San Francisco 49ers (2018)*; Arizona Cardinals (2018)*; Los Angeles Rams (2019–2023); Chicago Bears (2024); Los Angeles Rams (2025–present)
- * Offseason or practice squad member only

Awards and highlights
- Super Bowl champion (LVI); First-team All-Pac-12 (2017); Second-team All-Pac-12 (2016)

Career NFL statistics as of Week 4, 2026
- Games played: 111
- Games started: 70
- Fumble recoveries: 1
- Stats at Pro Football Reference

Coleman Rice Shelton (born July 28, 1995) is an American professional football center for the Los Angeles Rams of the National Football League (NFL). He played college football for the Washington Huskies.

== Early life ==
Shelton grew up in Pasadena, California and attended Loyola High School. A 3-star offensive line recruit, he committed to play college football at Washington over offers from Cal Poly, Colorado, Nevada, New Mexico State, and Northern Arizona.

== College career ==
Shelton was a member of the Washington Huskies for five seasons, redshirting his true freshman season. He played in all 13 of Washington's games as a redshirt freshman, starting seven. Coleman started every game the following season, playing three different positions (left tackle, left guard and right guard). He became the Huskies starting center going into his redshirt junior season and was named second-team All-Pac-12 Conference. Shelton again started all 13 of Washington's games as a redshirt senior and was named first-team All-Pac-12. He was Captain of the 2017 team and was twice awarded the John P. Angel Lineman of the Year trophy for outstanding play.

== Professional career ==
Pre-draft measurables
Height	Weight	Arm length	Hand span	Wingspan	40-yard dash	10-yard split	20-yard split	20-yard shuttle	Three-cone drill	Vertical jump	Broad jump
6 ft 3 3/8 in (1.91 m)	292 lb (132 kg)	31 1/2 in (0.80 m)	8 1/2 in (0.22 m)	6 ft 3 1/4 in (1.91 m)	5.24 s	1.78 s	3.00 s	4.59 s	7.62 s	27.5 in (0.70 m)	9 ft 2 in (2.79 m)
All values from NFL Combine/Pro Day

=== San Francisco 49ers ===
Shelton was signed by the San Francisco 49ers as an undrafted free agent on April 30, 2018. He was released at the end of training camp.

=== Arizona Cardinals ===
Shelton was signed to the practice squad of the Arizona Cardinals on October 15, 2018. He spent the rest of the 2018 season on the practice squad and was cut at the end of training camp going into the 2019 season.

=== Los Angeles Rams (first stint) ===
Shelton was signed by the Los Angeles Rams on September 2, 2019. Coleman made his NFL debut on September 22, 2019 against the Cleveland Browns. Shelton played in 11 games during the 2019 season. After the season the Rams tendered Shelton to a one-year contract as an exclusive-rights free agent. He signed the tender on April 27, 2020. Shelton played in 15 regular season games and both of the Rams' postseason games during the 2020 season, appearing exclusively on special teams. He was given another exclusive-rights tender by the Rams on March 4, 2021. He signed the tender on April 7.

Shelton saw his first extended playing time in Week 12 of the 2021 season, playing 67 snaps at center after starter Brian Allen suffered a knee injury during the Rams' first offensive snap in a 37–7 win over the Jacksonville Jaguars. He made his first career start the following game against the Cardinals. Shelton played in all 17 regular season with two starts during the 2021 season and also played in all four of the Rams' postseason games, including the team's 23–20 win over the Cincinnati Bengals in Super Bowl LVI.

On March 14, 2022, Shelton signed a two-year contract extension with the Rams. He won the starting center position and started for six games before suffering a high ankle sprain against the 49ers. He was placed on injured reserve on October 8, 2022. He was designated to return from injured reserve on November 9, 2022. He was activated from injured reserve three days later and started at center for all remaining regular season games.

On March 15, 2023, Shelton re-signed with the Rams. Shelton started at center in all 17 regular season games, including the Rams playoff game against the Detroit Lions.

=== Chicago Bears ===
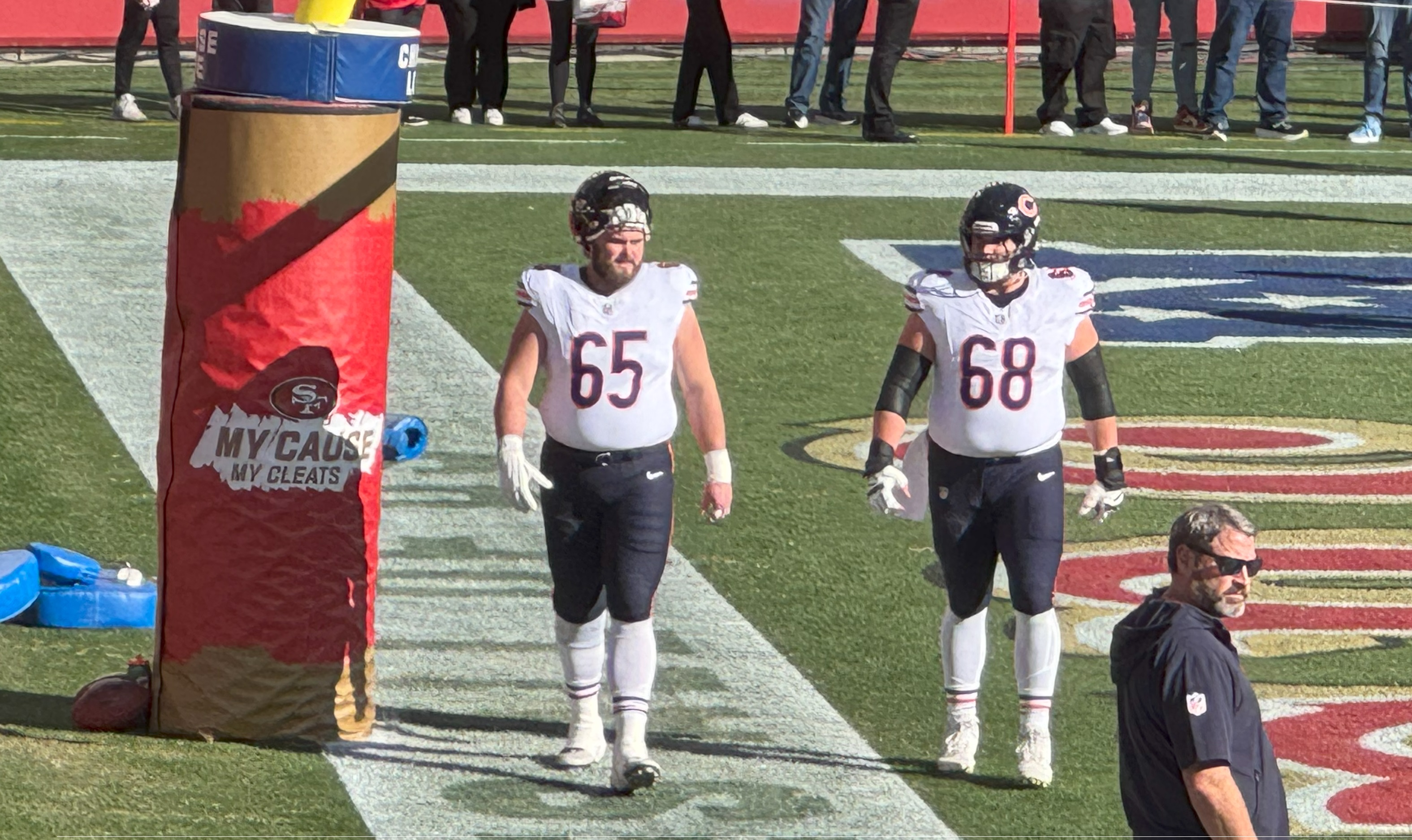
Shelton (left) with Doug Kramer Jr. in 2024

On March 14, 2024, Shelton signed with the Chicago Bears. He started all 17 games at center in 2024.

=== Los Angeles Rams (second stint) ===
On March 13, 2025, Shelton signed a two-year contract with the Los Angeles Rams.
