= Greg Gaines (defensive lineman) =

American football player (born 1996)

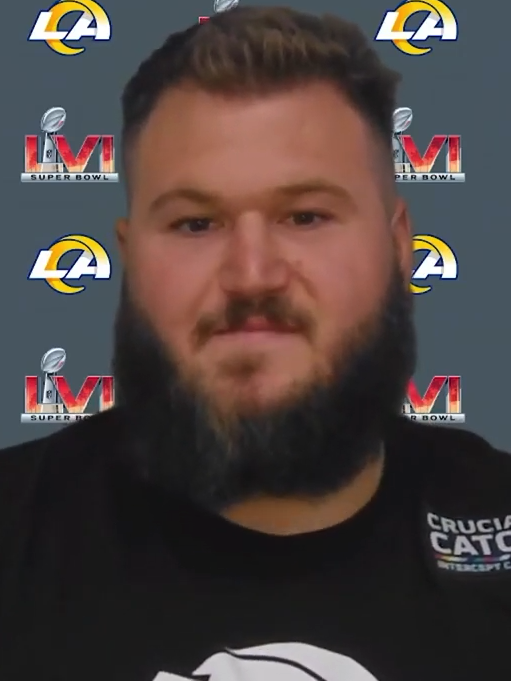

No. 97 – Buffalo Bills
- Position: Nose tackle
- Roster status: Active

Personal information
- Born: May 6, 1996 (age 30); La Habra, California, U.S.
- Listed height: 6 ft 1 in (1.85 m)
- Listed weight: 312 lb (142 kg)

Career information
- High school: La Habra
- College: Washington (2014–2018)
- NFL draft: 2019: 4th round, 134th overall pick

Career history
- Los Angeles Rams (2019–2022); Tampa Bay Buccaneers (2023–2025); Buffalo Bills (2026–present)

Awards and highlights
- Super Bowl champion (LVI); Morris Trophy (2018); First-team All-Pac-12 (2018); Second-team All-Pac-12 (2017)

Career NFL statistics as of Week 11, 2026
- Total tackles: 198
- Sacks: 14.5
- Fumble recoveries: 3
- Stats at Pro Football Reference

Greg Gaines (born May 6, 1996) is an American professional football nose tackle for the Buffalo Bills of the National Football League (NFL). He previously played in the NFL for the Tampa Bay Buccaneers, and the Los Angeles Rams, for whom he won Super Bowl LVI. He played college football for the Washington Huskies.

== Early life ==
Gaines attended La Habra High School in La Habra, California. Gaines originally committed to attend Boise State, but followed head coach Chris Petersen from Boise State to Washington when he became head coach.

== College career ==
Gaines played at Washington from 2015 to 2018, with 2014 serving as a red-shirt season. He earned honorable mention All-Pac-12 Conference in 2016 as a defensive lineman, second-team All-Pac-12 in 2017, and first-team All-Pac-12 in 2018. In 2018 he won the Morris Trophy, given annually to the best defensive lineman in the Pac-12 as voted on by opposing players.

== Professional career ==
Pre-draft measurables
| Height | Weight | Arm length | Hand span | Wingspan | 40-yard dash | 10-yard split | 20-yard split | 20-yard shuttle | Three-cone drill | Vertical jump | Broad jump | Bench press |
|---|---|---|---|---|---|---|---|---|---|---|---|---|
| 6 ft 1 in (1.85 m) | 312 lb (142 kg) | 31 1/4 in (0.79 m) | 9 5/8 in (0.24 m) | 6 ft 3 7/8 in (1.93 m) | 5.15 s | 1.76 s | 2.97 s | 4.67 s | 7.75 s | 31.0 in (0.79 m) | 9 ft 1 in (2.77 m) | 30 reps |
All values from NFL Combine/Pro Day

=== Los Angeles Rams ===
Gaines was selected by the Los Angeles Rams in the fourth round (134th overall) of the 2019 NFL draft. Gaines won Super Bowl LVI when the Rams defeated the Cincinnati Bengals, 23–20. Gaines recorded three tackles in the game.

=== Tampa Bay Buccaneers ===
On March 23, 2023, Gaines signed a one-year, $3.5 million contract with the Tampa Bay Buccaneers. He played in all 17 games, recording 24 tackles and one sack in a rotational role.

On March 12, 2024, Gaines signed a one-year contract extension with the Buccaneers. He played in 15 games with three starts, recording 17 tackles and one sack.

On March 13, 2025, Gaines re-signed with the Buccaneers on a one-year, $3.5 million contract.

=== Buffalo Bills ===
On August 18, 2026, Gaines signed a one-year contract with the Buffalo Bills.

== NFL career statistics ==
Legend
| | Won the Super Bowl |
| **Bold** | Career high |

=== Regular season ===
| Year | Team | Games | | Tackles | | | | | Interceptions | | | | | | Fumbles | | | | |
| Year | Team | GP | GS | Cmb | Solo | Ast | Sck | TFL | Int | Yds | Avg | Lng | TD | PD | FF | Fum | FR | Yds | TD |
|---|---|---|---|---|---|---|---|---|---|---|---|---|---|---|---|---|---|---|---|
| 2019 | LAR | 10 | 0 | 13 | 6 | 7 | 0.5 | 0 | 0 | 0 | 0.0 | 0 | 0 | 0 | 0 | 0 | 0 | 0 | 0 |
| 2020 | LAR | 16 | 0 | 18 | 9 | 9 | 1.5 | 1 | 0 | 0 | 0.0 | 0 | 0 | 0 | 0 | 0 | **1** | 0 | 0 |
| 2021 | LAR | 17 | 13 | **55** | **28** | **27** | **4.5** | 4 | 0 | 0 | 0.0 | 0 | 0 | 0 | 0 | 0 | 0 | 0 | 0 |
| 2022 | LAR | 16 | 12 | 36 | 16 | 20 | 4.0 | **6** | 0 | 0 | 0.0 | 0 | 0 | 0 | 0 | 0 | 0 | 0 | 0 |
| 2023 | TB | 17 | 2 | 24 | 7 | 17 | 1.0 | 0 | 0 | 0 | 0.0 | 0 | 0 | 0 | 0 | 0 | **1** | 0 | 0 |
| 2024 | TB | 15 | 3 | 17 | 7 | 10 | 1.0 | 2 | 0 | 0 | 0.0 | 0 | 0 | 0 | 0 | 0 | 0 | 0 | 0 |
| 2025 | TB | 17 | 4 | 23 | 12 | 11 | 2.0 | 3 | 0 | 0 | 0.0 | 0 | 0 | 0 | 0 | 0 | 0 | 0 | 0 |
| 2026 | BUF | 7 | 1 | 12 | 3 | 9 | 0.0 | 1 | 0 | 0 | 0.0 | 0 | 0 | 0 | 0 | 0 | **1** | 0 | 0 |
| Career | | 115 | 35 | 198 | 88 | 110 | 14.5 | 17 | 0 | 0 | 0.0 | 0 | 0 | 0 | 0 | 0 | 3 | 0 | 0 |

=== Postseason ===
| Year | Team | Games | | Tackles | | | | | Interceptions | | | | | | Fumbles | | | | |
| Year | Team | GP | GS | Cmb | Solo | Ast | Sck | TFL | Int | Yds | Avg | Lng | TD | PD | FF | Fum | FR | Yds | TD |
|---|---|---|---|---|---|---|---|---|---|---|---|---|---|---|---|---|---|---|---|
| 2020 | LAR | 2 | 0 | 3 | 2 | 1 | 0.0 | **1** | 0 | 0 | 0.0 | 0 | 0 | 0 | 0 | 0 | 0 | 0 | 0 |
| 2021 | LAR | 4 | 4 | **12** | **3** | **9** | 0.5 | **1** | 0 | 0 | 0.0 | 0 | 0 | **2** | 0 | 0 | 0 | 0 | 0 |
| 2023 | TB | 2 | 0 | 3 | 1 | 2 | **1.0** | **1** | 0 | 0 | 0.0 | 0 | 0 | 0 | 0 | 0 | 0 | 0 | 0 |
| 2024 | TB | 1 | 0 | 6 | **3** | 3 | 0.0 | **1** | 0 | 0 | 0.0 | 0 | 0 | 0 | 0 | 0 | 0 | 0 | 0 |
| Career | | 9 | 4 | 24 | 9 | 15 | 1.5 | 4 | 0 | 0 | 0.0 | 0 | 0 | 2 | 0 | 0 | 0 | 0 | 0 |
