= Tristan Vizcaino =

American football player (born 1996)

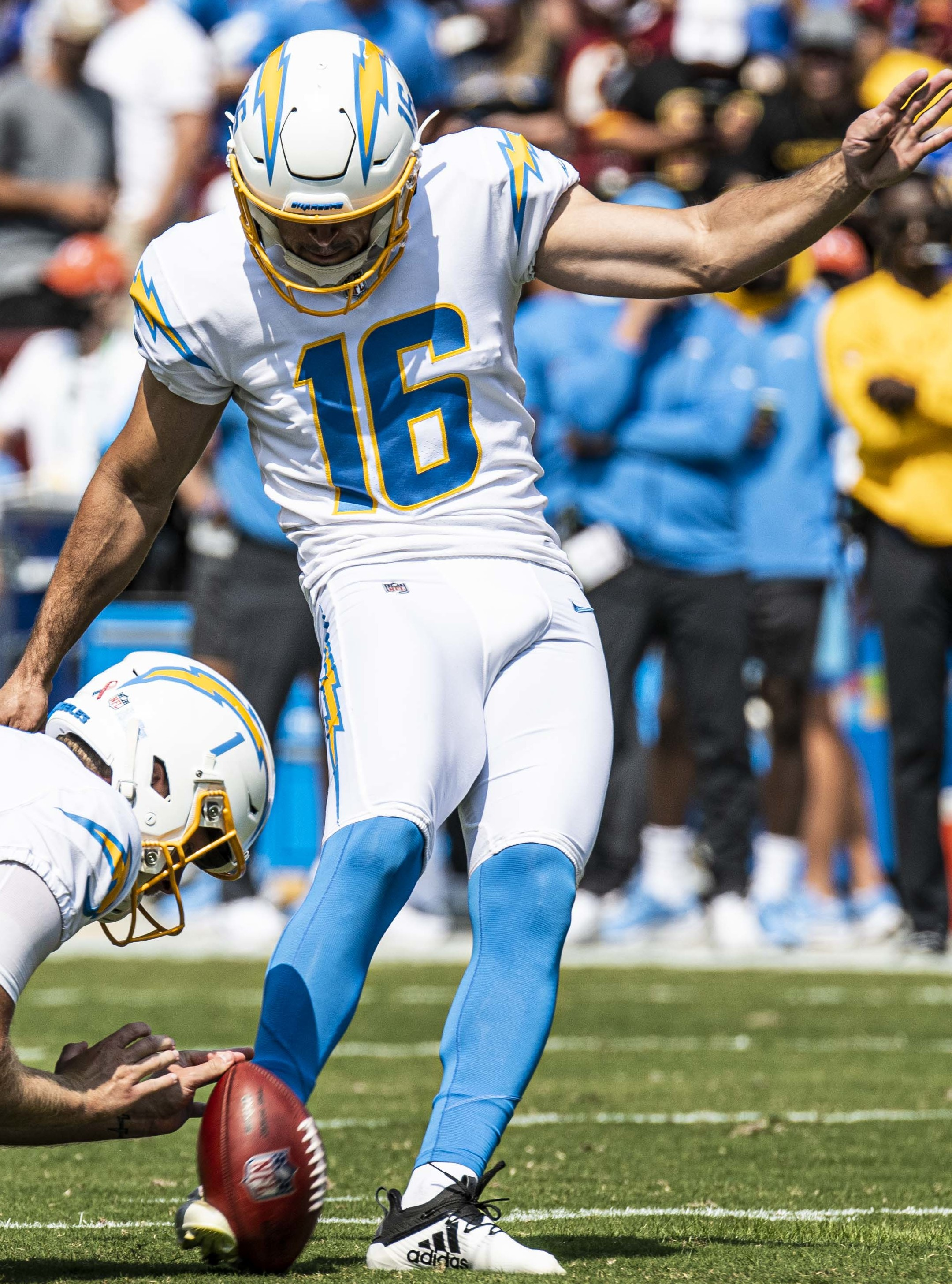
- Vizcaino with the Los Angeles Chargers in 2021

Profile
- Position: Kicker

Personal information
- Born: July 31, 1996 (age 30); Chino Hills, California, U.S.
- Listed height: 6 ft 2 in (1.88 m)
- Listed weight: 203 lb (92 kg)

Career information
- High school: Damien (La Verne, California)
- College: Washington
- NFL draft: 2018: undrafted

Career history
- Cincinnati Bengals (2019)*; Dallas Cowboys (2020)*; Cincinnati Bengals (2020)*; Minnesota Vikings (2020)*; San Francisco 49ers (2020); Buffalo Bills (2020)*; Los Angeles Chargers (2021); New England Patriots (2022)*; Arizona Cardinals (2022); New England Patriots (2022); Dallas Cowboys (2022)*; San Antonio Brahmas (2025)
- * Offseason or practice squad member only

Career NFL statistics
- Field goals made: 9
- Field goal attempts: 10
- Field goal %: 90.0
- Longest field goal: 47
- Stats at Pro Football Reference

Tristan Vizcaino (born July 31, 1996) is an American football placekicker. He signed with the Cincinnati Bengals as an undrafted free agent in 2019 following his college football career at Washington. He has also been a member of the Minnesota Vikings and the San Francisco 49ers.

== College career ==
Vizcaino attended the University of Washington from 2014 to 2017, playing football as a kicker and punter. His most significant action came in 2017, where he made twelve field goals. He went undrafted in the 2018 NFL draft.

== Professional career ==
Pre-draft measurables
Height	Weight	Arm length	Hand span
6 ft 2 1/8 in (1.88 m)	208 lb (94 kg)	30 5/8 in (0.78 m)	8 5/8 in (0.22 m)
All values from Pro Day

=== Cincinnati Bengals (first stint) ===
Vizcaino attended a rookie minicamp tryout with the New York Jets in May 2018, but did not sign with the team. He signed a reserve/futures contract with the Cincinnati Bengals on January 1, 2019. He was waived on August 30, 2019.

=== Dallas Cowboys (first stint) ===
Vizcaino remained unsigned during the 2019 NFL season, but signed a Reserve/Futures contract with the Dallas Cowboys on January 21, 2020. He was waived on April 22.

=== Cincinnati Bengals (second stint) ===
Vizcaino re-signed with the Bengals on August 1, 2020, and was waived again on August 26.

=== Minnesota Vikings ===
Vizcaino was signed to the Minnesota Vikings' practice squad on November 21, 2020. He was released on December 15.

=== San Francisco 49ers ===
Vizcaino was signed to the San Francisco 49ers' practice squad on January 1, 2021. He was elevated to the active roster the next day for the team's week 17 game against the Seattle Seahawks to kick in place of Robbie Gould, who was in COVID-19 protocols, and reverted to the practice squad after the game. Vizcaino made his NFL debut in the game, making all three of his attempted field goals. His practice squad contract with the team expired after the season on January 11, 2021.

=== Buffalo Bills ===
Vizcaino was signed to the Buffalo Bills' practice squad on January 23, 2021. His practice squad contract with the team expired after the season on February 1, 2021.

=== Los Angeles Chargers ===
On March 5, 2021, Vizcaino signed with the Los Angeles Chargers. He won the starting kicker job over Michael Badgley to begin the season. However, Vizcaino was waived on October 26, 2021, after missing a league-high five extra point attempts through the season's first seven weeks. He was later re-signed to the practice squad.

=== New England Patriots (first stint) ===
Vizcaino signed with the New England Patriots on June 10, 2022. He was waived on August 30, 2022. He was re-signed to the practice squad on September 21. He was released on November 1.

=== Arizona Cardinals ===
On November 12, 2022, Vizcaino was signed to the Arizona Cardinals active roster. He was waived on November 15.

=== New England Patriots (second stint) ===
On November 21, 2022, Vizcaino signed with the practice squad of the New England Patriots. Vizcaino was elevated for the week 13 game against the Buffalo Bills to handle kickoff duties after Nick Folk allowed a kickoff return for a touchdown the previous week.

=== Dallas Cowboys (second stint) ===
On January 18, 2023, Vizcaino was signed to the Dallas Cowboys' practice squad. He was re-signed on February 22, 2023. Vizcaino was released by Dallas prior to the start of the regular season on August 7.

=== San Antonio Brahmas ===
On April 18, 2025, Vizcaino signed with the San Antonio Brahmas of the United Football League (UFL).
