= 2017 Arizona Wildcats football team =

American college football season

2017 Arizona Wildcats football

Foster Farms Bowl, L 35–38 vs. Purdue
- Conference: Pac-12 Conference
- South Division
- Record: 7–6 (5–4 Pac-12)
- Head coach: Rich Rodriguez (6th season)
- Co-offensive coordinators: Calvin Magee (6th season); Rod Smith (6th season)
- Offensive scheme: Spread option
- Defensive coordinator: Marcel Yates (2nd season)
- Base defense: 4–2–5
- Captain: Game captains
- Home stadium: Arizona Stadium

Uniform
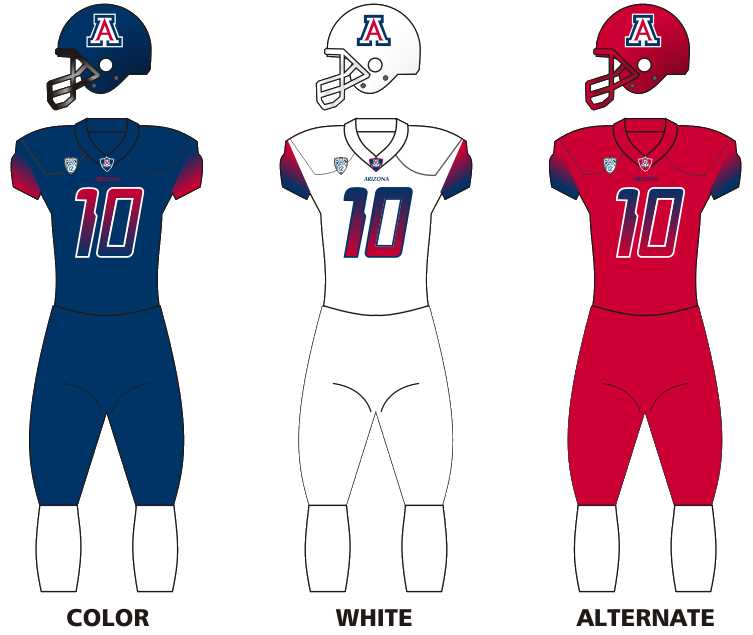

2017 Pac-12 Conference football standings
	Conf.			Overall
Team	W		L	W		L
North Division
No. 20 Stanford xy	7	–	2	9	–	5
No. 16 Washington x	7	–	2	10	–	3
Washington State	6	–	3	9	–	4
Oregon	4	–	5	7	–	6
California	2	–	7	5	–	7
Oregon State	0	–	9	1	–	11
South Division
No. 12 USC xy$	8	–	1	11	–	3
Arizona State	6	–	3	7	–	6
Arizona	5	–	4	7	–	6
UCLA	4	–	5	6	–	7
Utah	3	–	6	7	–	6
Colorado	2	–	7	5	–	7
Championship: USC 31, Stanford 28
$ – Conference champion; x – Division champion/co-champions; y – Championship game participant; Rankings from AP Poll

The 2017 Arizona Wildcats football team represented the University of Arizona during the 2017 season. The season was the Wildcats's 118th overall, 40th as a member of the Pac-12 Conference, seventh within the Pac-12 South Division, and the sixth and final year under head coach Rich Rodriguez. The team played their home games at Arizona Stadium in Tucson, Arizona for the 89th straight year.

They finished the regular season with a 7–5, 5–4 in Pac-12 play to finish in third place in the South Division, making it into a bowl game. They were invited to the Foster Farms Bowl where they faced Purdue, losing 35–38. Rich Rodriguez was fired after 6 seasons with Arizona. After Rich Rodriguez was fired, Kevin Sumlin was named the Wildcats' new full-time head coach on January 14, 2018.

== Offseason departures ==
The Wildcats would lose twenty-nine (twenty seniors due graduation) football players. The Wildcats would lose nine more players from the 2016 team due to various reasons (transfers and withdrawals will be filled out once spring practice occurs). Notable departures from the 2016 squad included.

Name	Number	Pos.	Year	Notes
Tellas Jones	#1	S	RS senior	Graduated
Cam Denson	#3	WR	Senior	Medically retired from the injury. The Tucson native had one catch for five yards in this season.
Kahi Neves	#7	LB	RS freshman	Dismissed from the team.
Samajie Grant	#10	WR-RB	Senior	Graduated
Michael Barton	#11	LB	RS senior	Graduated
Nate Phillips	#11	WR	Senior	Graduated
Anu Solomon	#12	QB	RS junior	Elected to transfer to Baylor, he is expected to graduate early and be eligible to play in 2017.
Devin Holiday	#13	CB	Senior	Graduated
Paul Magloire Jr.	#14	LB	RS senior	Graduated
Matt Morin	#15	TE	RS senior	Graduated
Josh Kern	#17	TE	RS senior	Graduated
Davonte' Neal	#19	CB	RS senior	Graduated
Orlando Bradford	#21	RB	Sophomore	dismissed from the football program
Tyler Grammer	#43	S	RS senior	Graduated
DeJean King	#44	S	Senior	Graduated
Jake Matthews	#47	LB	Senior	Graduated
Brion Anduze	#48	TE	RS sophomore	Retired from injuries.
Justin Holt	#50	OT-DT	RS freshman	Retired from injuries.
John Kenny	#52	LB	RS senior	Leaving from the team.
Darrell Cloy Jr.	#55	DL	RS sophomore	Medically retires from injuries.
Cody Ippolito	#57	LB	RS senior	Elected to transfer to Utah, he is expected to graduate early and be eligible to play in 2017.
Matthew Stagg	#59	LB	RS senior	Graduated
Aiulua Fanene	#62	DL	RS senior	Graduated
Keenan Walker	#63	DL	RS freshman	Elected to transfer to Independence CC.
Zach Hemilla	#65	OL	RS senior	Posthumously Graduated
Freddie Tagaloa	#72	OL	RS senior	Graduated
Harper Sherman	#77	OL	RS freshman	Dismissed from the team.
Calvin Allen	#94	DL	RS junior	Elected to transfer to New Mexico State.
Sani Fuimano	#99	DL	Senior	Graduated

== Preseason ==
=== Recruiting Class of 2017 ===
The Wildcats signed 39 players including 10 HS walk-on players, 24 high school recruits, 3 JC transfers from junior colleges and 1 transfers were from NCAA Division I (FBS) programs. Five of the recruits were already enrolled for the spring, 2017 semester while 24 signed letters of intent on National Signing Day is February 3, 2017. Arizona is combined to be a unanimous top-25 class, ranked as high as (#21 by Scout, #15 by Rivals, #26 by ESPN, and #23 by 247) and finish top-5 in the Pac-12 recruitment class (#4 by 247, #4 by Scout, #4 by ESPN, and #4 by Rivals).

College recruiting
Name	Hometown	School	Height	Weight	Commit date
Jose Ramirez; OLB	Auburndale, FL	Auburndale HS	6 ft 3 in (1.91 m)	195 lb (88 kg)	Enrolled (Committed)
Jose Ramirez; OLB	Recruit ratings: Scout: Rivals: 247Sports: ESPN:				
Nathan Tilford #36 RB	Ontario, CA	Colony HS	6 ft 1 in (1.85 m)	205 lb (93 kg)	Enrolled (Committed)
Nathan Tilford #36 RB	Recruit ratings: Scout: 247Sports: ESPN:				
Tony Fields II #33 OLB	Las Vegas, NV	Desert Pines HS	6 ft 1 in (1.85 m)	200 lb (91 kg)	Enrolled (Committed)
Tony Fields II #33 OLB	Recruit ratings: Scout: 247Sports: ESPN:				
Bryce Gilbert #15 TE-H	Gilbert, AZ	Higley HS	6 ft 4 in (1.93 m)	220 lb (100 kg)	Enrolled (Committed)
Bryce Gilbert #15 TE-H	Recruit ratings: Scout: 247Sports: ESPN:				
K'hari Lane; QB	Montezuma, GA	Macon County HS	6 ft 0 in (1.83 m)	222 lb (101 kg)	02/12/17 (Enrolled, Committed)
K'hari Lane; QB	Recruit ratings: Scout: 247Sports: ESPN:				
Gary Brightwell; RB	Baltimore, MD	St. Frances Academy	5 ft 10 in (1.78 m)	160 lb (73 kg)	02/01/17 (Enrolled, Committed)
Gary Brightwell; RB	Recruit ratings: Scout: Rivals: 247Sports: ESPN:				
Anthony Pandy; DE	Harbor City, CA	Narbonne HS	6 ft 2 in (1.88 m)	220 lb (100 kg)	01/24/2017 (Enrolled, Committed)
Anthony Pandy; DE	Recruit ratings: Scout: Rivals: 247Sports: ESPN:				
My-King Johnson #79 DE	Tempe, AZ	Tempe HS	6 ft 4 in (1.93 m)	225 lb (102 kg)	01/16/2017 (Enrolled, Committed)
My-King Johnson #79 DE	Recruit ratings: Scout: Rivals: 247Sports: ESPN:				
Lucas Havrisik; K/P	Norco, CA	Norco HS	6 ft 1 in (1.85 m)	215 lb (98 kg)	01/15/2017 (Enrolled, Committed)
Lucas Havrisik; K/P	Recruit ratings: Scout: Rivals: 247Sports: ESPN:				
Colin Schooler; ILB	Mission Viejo, CA	Mission Viejo HS	6 ft 1 in (1.85 m)	215 lb (98 kg)	12/27/2016 (Enrolled, Committed)
Colin Schooler; ILB	Recruit ratings: Scout: Rivals: 247Sports: ESPN:				
Jalen Harris #34 DE	Mesa, AZ	Desert Ridge HS	6 ft 3 in (1.91 m)	210 lb (95 kg)	08/05/2016 (Enrolled, Committed)
Jalen Harris #34 DE	Recruit ratings: Scout: Rivals: 247Sports: ESPN:				
Kurtis Brown #43 DT	Bakersfield, CA	Liberty HS	6 ft 1 in (1.85 m)	276 lb (125 kg)	04/05/2016 (Enrolled, Committed)
Kurtis Brown #43 DT	Recruit ratings: Scout: 247Sports: ESPN:				
Brian Casteel #135 WR	Covina, CA	Charter Oak HS	5 ft 10 in (1.78 m)	193 lb (88 kg)	06/11/2016 (Enrolled, Committed)
Brian Casteel #135 WR	Recruit ratings: Scout: 247Sports: ESPN:				
Scott Young #51 S	La Mesa, CA	Helix HS	5 ft 11 in (1.80 m)	186 lb (84 kg)	06/15/2016 (Enrolled, Committed)
Scott Young #51 S	Recruit ratings: Scout: 247Sports: ESPN:				
Troy Young #56 S	Mobile, AL	Mobile Christian HS	6 ft 0 in (1.83 m)	193 lb (88 kg)	07/23/2016 (Enrolled, Committed)
Troy Young #56 S	Recruit ratings: Scout: 247Sports: ESPN:				
Kylan Wilborn #70 DE	Sherman Oaks, CA	Notre Dame HS	6 ft 1 in (1.85 m)	236 lb (107 kg)	04/05/2016 (Enrolled, Committed)
Kylan Wilborn #70 DE	Recruit ratings: Scout: 247Sports: ESPN:				
Joshua Brown #27 ILB	Long Beach, CA	Long Beach Polytechnic HS	6 ft 1 in (1.85 m)	243 lb (110 kg)	06/12/2016 (Enrolled, Committed)
Joshua Brown #27 ILB	Recruit ratings: Scout: 247Sports: ESPN:				
Malik Housman #69 CB	Las Vegas, NV	Bishop Gorman HS	5 ft 11 in (1.80 m)	168 lb (76 kg)	06/20/2016 (Committed, Walk-On)
Malik Housman #69 CB	Recruit ratings: Scout: 247Sports: ESPN:				
Bryce Wolma #31 TE-Y	Saline, MI	Saline HS	6 ft 4 in (1.93 m)	230 lb (100 kg)	04/06/2016 (Enrolled, Committed)
Bryce Wolma #31 TE-Y	Recruit ratings: Scout: 247Sports: ESPN:				
Edgar Burrola #77 OT	Las Vegas, NV	Desert Pines HS	6 ft 6 in (1.98 m)	295 lb (134 kg)	06/08/2016 (Walk-On, Committed)
Edgar Burrola #77 OT	Recruit ratings: Scout: 247Sports: ESPN:				
Drew Dixon #80 ATH	Tucson, AZ	Sabino HS	6 ft 3 in (1.91 m)	199 lb (90 kg)	06/05/2016 (Enrolled, Committed)
Drew Dixon #80 ATH	Recruit ratings: Scout: 247Sports: ESPN:				
Rhett Rodriguez #39 QB-DT	Tucson, AZ	Catalina Foothills HS	6 ft 0 in (1.83 m)	193 lb (88 kg)	01/16/2016 (Enrolled, Committed)
Rhett Rodriguez #39 QB-DT	Recruit ratings: Scout: 247Sports: ESPN:				
Xavier Bell #74 S	Santa Ana, CA	Mater Dei HS	6 ft 2 in (1.88 m)	185 lb (84 kg)	06/17/2016 (Enrolled, Committed)
Xavier Bell #74 S	Recruit ratings: Scout: 247Sports: ESPN:				
Tony Wallace; CB	Las Vegas, NV	Desert Pines HS	5 ft 10 in (1.78 m)	170 lb (77 kg)	12/17/2016 (Enrolled, Committed)
Tony Wallace; CB	Recruit ratings: Scout: 247Sports: ESPN:				
Rhedi Short #111 CB	Los Angeles, CA	Cathedral HS	6 ft 1 in (1.85 m)	177 lb (80 kg)	07/03/2016 (Enrolled, Committed)
Rhedi Short #111 CB	Recruit ratings: Scout: 247Sports: ESPN:				
Overall recruit ranking: Scout: #21 Rivals: #15 247Sports: #23 ESPN: #26
‡ Refers to 40-yard dash; Note: In many cases, Scout, Rivals, 247Sports, On3, and ESPN may conflict in their listings of height, weight and 40 time.; In these cases, the average was taken. ESPN grades are on a 100-point scale.; Sources: "Arizona Football Commitment List". Rivals.; "2017 Arizona Commits". Scout.; "2017 Player Commitments – Arizona". ESPN.; "Scout.com Team Recruiting Rankings". Scout.; "2017 Team Ranking". Rivals.com.; "2017 Arizona Wildcats football team". 247Sports.

==== Incoming transfers ====
In addition to the 2017 recruiting class, Arizona did add four transfers, which includes eligible for the current season, to the 2017 roster:

List of incoming transfers
Name	Pos.	Eligible beginning	Years of eligibility	Previous school	Notes
Sione Taufahema	DT	2017	2	--	Junior college transfer from College of the Canyons.
Dereck Boles	DL	2017	2	Boise State	Junior college transfer from Coffeyville CC. Boles will be eligible to play in 2017. In 2014, Boles was a 3-star recruit out of Lakeland HS in Lakefield, FL.
Thiyo Lukusa	OL	2017	3	MichiganState	transfer from Michigan State. Lukusa will be eligible to play in 2018 (sit out for the 2017 season) due to the NCAA transfer rules. In 2016, Lukusa was a 4-star recruit out of DePaul Catholic HS in Wayne, NJ.
Maisen Knight	OL	2017	2	--	Junior college transfer from Ventura College.

=== Position key ===
Back	B	Center	C	Cornerback	CB	Defensive back	DB
Defensive end	DE	Defensive lineman	DL	Defensive tackle	DT	End	E
Fullback	FB	Guard	G	Halfback	HB	Kicker	K
Kickoff returner	KR	Offensive tackle	OT	Offensive lineman	OL	Linebacker	LB
Long snapper	LS	Punter	P	Punt returner	PR	Quarterback	QB
Running back	RB	Safety	S	Tight end	TE	Wide receiver	WR

=== Spring practice ===
==== Spring game ====
The 2017 Wildcats had spring practice from February 2017 to March 2, 2017. The 2017 Arizona football spring game will take place in Tucson, AZ at a date and time to be determined.

Date	Time	Spring Game	Site	TV	Result	Attendance
March 2, 2017		Navy/Blue vs. Red/White	Arizona Stadium • Tucson, AZ	P12N	37-21	-

=== Fall practice ===
Fall camp is scheduled for August.

=== Pac-12 Media Days ===
Pac-12 media days are set for July 2017 in Hollywood, California.

=== Returning starters ===
Arizona returns 30 starters in 2017, including 14 on offense, 9 on defense, and 7 on special teams.

Projecting Returning Starters 2017

==== Offense (14) ====
Player	Class	Position	Games Started
Brandon Dawkins (13)	RS junior	Quarterback	
Khalil Tate (14)	Sophomore	Quarterback	
Nick Wilson (28)	Senior	Running back	
Tyrell Johnson (2)	Senior	Wide receiver	
Shun Brown (6)	Junior	Wide receiver	
Shawn Poindexter (19)	Senior	Wide receiver	
Layth Friekh (58)	Senior	Left tackle	
Christian Boettcher (69)	RS junior	Left guard	
Trevor Wood (8)	RS junior	Tight end	
Jacob Alsadek (78)	RS senior	Right guard	
Gerhard de Beer (67)	RS senior	Right tackle	
Levi Walton (58)	RS junior	Center	

==== Defense (9) ====
Player	Class	Position	Game started
Jarrius Wallace (3)	RS freshman	Safety	
Chacho Ulloa (20)	Sophomore	Safety	
Jack Banda (92)	RS senior	Defensive lineman	
DeAndre' Miller (32)	RS senior	Linebacker	
Jarvis McCall Jr. (29)	RS senior	Cornerback	
Kwesi Mashack (15)	Senior	Cornerback	
Jace Whittaker (17)	Junior	Cornerback	
Parker Zellers (93)	RS senior	Defensive lineman	

==== Special teams (7) ====
Player	Class	Position	Game started
Josh Pollack (9)	RS sophomore	Placekicker	13 games
Jake Glatting (16)	RS sophomore	Punter	
Matt Aargon (26)	RS freshman	Punter	
Nick Reinhardt (56)	RS freshman	Long snapper	
Donald Rieter (51)	RS freshman	Long snapper	
Zach Werlinger (51)	RS sophomore	Holder (QB)	

† Indicates player was a starter in 2016 but missed all of 2017 due to injury.

== Personnel ==
=== Roster ===
2017 Arizona Wildcats roster
**Quarterbacks**: **4** Rhett Rodriguez (**H**), Freshman; **10** Zach Werlinger, RS junior; **11** K'Hari Lane, Freshman; **13** Brandon Dawkins, RS junior; **14** Khalil Tate, Sophomore; **15** Donavan Tate, Freshman; **17** Andrew Tovar, Freshman; **Running backs**: **23** Gary Brightwell, Freshman; **23** J. J. Taylor, RS freshman; **25** Jamardre Cobb, RS junior; **28** Nick Wilson (**C**), Senior; **32** Jake Laudenslager, RS freshman; **33** Nathan Tilford, Freshman; **34** Zach Green (**C**), RS senior; **35** Dakota Poe, Freshman; **36** Noah Pittenger, Freshman; **38** Brandon Leon, RS sophomore; **42** Quincy Wimbish, RS freshman; **Wide receivers**: **1** Drew Dixon, Freshman; **2** Tyrell Johnson (**C**, **KR**), Senior; **5** Brian Casteel, Freshman; **6** Shun Brown (**KR/PR**), Junior; **7** DeVaughn Cooper, RS freshman; **9** Tony Ellison (**PR**), RS junior; **18** Cedric Peterson (**KR**), RS sophomore; **19** Shawn Poindexter (**C**), Senior; **24** Darick Holmes Jr., RS sophomore; **40** Thomas Reid III, RS freshman; **80** Isaiah Randle, Freshman; **82** Donovan Walker, RS junior; **84** Isaiah Lovett, Freshman; **86** Stanley Berryhill, Freshman; **87** Zach Benjamin (**C**), RS senior; **89** Donovan Moore, RS junior	**Tight ends**: **8** Trevor Wood, RS junior; **12** Bryce Gilbert, Freshman; **81** Bryce Wolma, Freshman; **85** Jamie Nunley, RS freshman; **Offensive linemen**: **50** Josh McCauley, RS freshman; **53** Jon Jacobs, RS freshman; **54** Bryson Cain (**OT**), (injured) RS freshman: **55** Levi Walton, RS junior; **58** Layth Friekh (**C**), Senior; **64** Nathan Elridge, RS sophomore; **67** Gerhard de Beer (**C**), RS senior; **69** Christian Boettcher, RS junior; **70** Thiyo Lukusa, (redshirt) Sophomore; **72** Edgar Burrola, Freshman; **74** Alex Kosinski, RS sophomore; **75** Michael Eletise (**OT**), RS freshman; **76** Cody Creason, RS sophomore; **77** Maisen Knight, Junior; **78** Jacob Alsadek (**C**), RS senior; **79** Tyson Gardner, Freshman; **Defensive end**: **14** Kylan Wilborn, Freshman; **20** Jose Ramirez, Freshman; **32** DeAndre' Miller (**C**), RS senior; **39** Francisco Nelson, RS freshman; **51** Lee Anderson III, Sophomore; **52** Jalen Harris, Freshman; **59** My-King Johnson, Freshman; **82** Dante Blissit, Freshman; **86** Justin Belknap, RS sophomore; **92** Jack Banda (**C**), RS senior	**Defensive linemen**: **44** Kurtis Brown, Freshman; **60** Luca Bruno (**C**), RS senior; **81** Jalen Cochran, (injured) RS freshman: **90** Matt Thomas, RS sophomore; **91** Finton Connolly, RS sophomore; **93** Parker Zellers (**C**),RS senior; **94** Sione Tuafauela (**DT**), Junior; **96** Marcus Griffin (**C**), RS junior; **98** Larry Tharpe Jr., RS junior; **99** Dereck Boles, RS junior; **Linebackers**: **1** Tony Fields II, Freshman; **5** Gavin Robertson Jr., RS freshman; **7** Colin Schooler, Freshman; **12** Josh Brown, Freshman; **18** Brandon Rutt, RS junior; **26** Anthony Pandy, Freshman; **28** Carrington Vaughn, (injured) RS sophomore: **34** Jacob Colacion, RS freshman; **47** Rourke Freeburg, Freshman; **50** Ken Samson, Freshman; **53** Richard Merritt, RS freshman; **54** Elijah Ruiz, Freshman; **56** Rexx Tessler, Freshman; **Cornerbacks**: **2** Lorenzo Burns, RS freshman; **8** Antonio Parks, RS freshman; **9** Dane Cruikshank (**C**), RS senior; **10** Malcolm Holland, RS sophomore; **15** Kwesi Mashack, (**C**) Senior; **17** Jace Whittaker, Junior; **25** Sammy Morrison, RS sophomore; **30** Antonio Wallace, Freshman; **35** Isaiah Strong, RS senior; **38** Malik Hausman, Freshman; **49** Lee Pitts, RS freshman	**Safeties**: **3** Jarrius Wallace, RS freshman; **6** Demetrius Flannigan-Fowles (FS), Junior; **11** Troy Young, Freshman; **13** Chacho Ulloa, Sophomore; **19** Scott Young, Freshman; **21** Isaiah Hayes, Sophomore; **23** Devon Brewer, RS sophomore; **25** Anthony Mariscal, RS sophomore; **29** Jarvis McCall Jr., (**C**) RS senior; **31** Tristan Cooper, Sophomore; **33** Kyeler Burke, Sophomore; **37** Xavier Bell, Freshman; **Placekickers**: **30** Josh Pollack, RS sophomore; **43** Lucas Havrisik, Freshman; **Punters**: **16** Jake Glatting (**H**), RS junior; **26** Matt Aragon, RS sophomore; **Long snappers**: **51** Donald Reiter, RS freshman; **56** Nick Reinhardt; (injured) , RS junior: **61** James Offerman, Freshman; Classes Key: Fr – Freshman; first year player. So – Sophomore; second year player. Jr – Junior; third year player. Sr – Senior; fourth year player. **Bold** – Team captain. Italics – Left team during the season. RS – Previously used a redshirt. – Redshirt during 2017 season. – Injured for entire or majority of season and is eligible for a medical redshirt. Arizona Wildcats roster

*2017 Arizona Football Commits (07/28/2017)
- Projecting Roster

=== Coaching staff ===
Name	Position	Consecutive season at Arizona in current position
Rich Rodriguez	Head coach	6th year
Calvin Magee	Associate head coach and co-Offensive coordinator/running backs	6th year
Rod Smith	Offensive coordinator and quarterbacks coach	6th year
Vince Amey	Defensive line coach	2nd year
Marcel Yates	Defensive coordinator and defensive backs coach	2nd year
Brian Knorr	Tight ends coach and special teams coordinator	1st year
Theron Aych	Assistant coach and wide receivers coach and passing game coordinator	1st year
Scott Boone	Assistant coach and linebackers	1st year
Jahmile Addae	Assistant coach and safeties	2nd year
Jim Michalczik	Assistant coach and OL	4th year
Chuck Cecil	Senior defensive analyst	1st year
Chris Allen	Associate athletic director, co-strength/conditioning coach	6th year

=== Depth chart ===
**Defense**

FS
Demetrius Flannigan-Fowles
Troy Young
⋅

WLB	MLB	SLB
Kylan Wilborn	Tony Fields II	Brandon Rutt or Colin Schooler
⋅	Jacob Colacion	⋅
⋅	⋅	⋅

SS
Scottie Young Jr.
Jarrius Wallace
--

CB
Dane Cruikshank
Tristan Cooper
⋅

DE	DT	DT	DE
Justin Belknap	Dereck Boles (NOSE)	Parker Zellers	Jace Whittaker
Jack Banda	Luca Bruno (NOSE)	Finton Connolly	Tony Wallace
⋅	⋅	--	--

CB
Lorenzo Burns
Sammy Morrison
⋅

**Offense**

WR
Cedric Peterson
Brian Casteel
⋅

WR
Shun Brown
Tyrell Johnson
⋅

LT	LG	C	RG	RT
Layth Friekh	Christian Boettcher	Nathan Eldridge	Jacob Alsadek	Cody Creason or Gerhard de Beer
Josh McCauley	Michael Eletise	Levi Walton	Alex Kosinski	⋅
⋅	⋅	⋅	⋅	⋅

TE
Trevor Wood
Bryce Wolma
⋅

WR
Shawn Poindexter
Donovan Walker
⋅

QB
Brandon Dawkins
or
Khalil Tate
Donavan Tate
or
Rhett Rodriguez
⋅

Key reserves
*Edgar Burrola – (OT)
*Malik Hausman – (CB)
*Bryson Cain – (OL)
*Jalen Cochran – (DL)
*Nick Reinhardt – (LS)
*Carrington Vaughn – (LB)
(Out for Season)
*DeAndre Miller – (LB)
*Isaiah Hayes - (S)
*Donovan Walker – (WR)
*Trevor Wood – (TE) (Out)
(Suspension)
(Transfer out)

Special teams
**PK** Josh Pollack
or
Lucas Havrisik
**P** Jake Glatting
**P** Josh Pollack
or
Matt Aragon
**KR** Shun Brown
Cedric Peterson
Tyrell Johnson
**PR** Shun Brown
Tony Ellison
**LS** Nick Reinhardt
Donald Reiter
**H** Jake Glatting
Rhett Rodriguez

RB
Nick Wilson
or
J. J. Taylor
Zach Green
⋅

Depth Chart Source: 2017 Arizona Wildcats Football Fact Book

True Freshman
Double Position : *

=== Injury report ===
Player	Position	Status	Injury	Date of Injury	Date of Return (Anticipated)
DeAndre Miller	LB	Out	Foot	Sept. 2	TBA
Bryson Cain	OL	Out (season)	Knee	Sept. 2	2018
Jalen Cochran	DL	Out (season)	torn pectoral tendon	Sept. 2	2018
Nick Reinhardt	LS	Out (season)	Knee	Sept. 15	2018
Carrington Vaughn	LB	Out (season)	Knee	Sept. 15	2018
Jamie Nunley	TE	Out	Shoulder	Sept. 15	TBA
Cam Denson	WR	Out	Foot	Sept. 2	Sept. 9th
Isaiah Hayes	S	Out	Shoulder	Sept. 2	TBA
Donovan Walker	WR	Out	Shoulder	Sept. 9	TBA

== Regular season ==
=== Schedule ===
Arizona announced its 2017 football schedule on November 29, 2016. The 2017 Wildcats' schedule consisted of 7 home and 4 away games for the regular season. Arizona hosted nine Pac-12 conference opponents UCLA, Utah, Oregon State and Washington State and traveled to California, Colorado, Oregon, USC and traveled to arch rival Arizona State for the 91st annual Territorial Cup to close out the regular season. Arizona was not scheduled to play Pac-12 North opponents Stanford and Washington in the 2017 regular season.

Arizona's out of conference opponents represented the American, Big Sky, and C-USA. The Wildcats hosted three non–conference games which were against Northern Arizona from the Big Sky and Houston from the American and traveled to El Paso, TX against Texas–El Paso from the C-USA.

Date	Time	Opponent	Rank	Site	TV	Result	Attendance
September 2	8:00 p.m.	Northern Arizona*		Arizona Stadium; Tucson, AZ	P12N	W 62–24	43,620
September 9	7:30 p.m.	Houston*		Arizona Stadium; Tucson, AZ	ESPNU	L 16–19	43,334
September 15	7:15 p.m.	at UTEP*		Sun Bowl; El Paso, TX	ESPN	W 63–16	22,133
September 22	7:30 p.m.	No. 23 Utah		Arizona Stadium; Tucson, AZ	FS1	L 24–30	36,651
October 7	5:00 p.m.	at Colorado		Folsom Field; Boulder, CO	P12N	W 45–42	49,976
October 14	6:00 p.m.	UCLA		Arizona Stadium; Tucson, AZ	P12N	W 47–30	48,380
October 21	4:00 p.m.	at California		Memorial Stadium; Berkeley, CA	P12N	W 45–44 ^{2OT}	37,525
October 28	6:30 p.m.	No. 15 Washington State^{†}		Arizona Stadium; Tucson, AZ	P12N	W 58–37	42,822
November 4	7:45 p.m.	at No. 17 USC	No. 22	LA Memorial Coliseum; Los Angeles, CA	ESPN	L 35–49	70,225
November 11	9:00 p.m.	Oregon State		Arizona Stadium; Tucson, AZ	ESPN2	W 49–28	40,984
November 18	5:00 p.m.	at Oregon		Autzen Stadium; Eugene, OR	P12N	L 28–48	51,799
November 25	2:30 p.m.	at Arizona State		Sun Devil Stadium; Tempe, AZ (rivalry)	P12N	L 30–42	59,385
December 27	6:30 p.m.	vs. Purdue*		Levi's Stadium; Santa Clara, CA (Foster Farms Bowl)	FOX	L 35–38	28,436
*Non-conference game; ^{†}Homecoming; Rankings from AP Poll & CFP Rankings (beginning in Week 9) released prior to game; All times are in Mountain time

Schedule Source

Legend
Arizona win
Arizona loss

== Game summaries ==
=== vs Northern Arizona ===
Northern Arizona Lumberjacks (0–0) vs Arizona Wildcats (0–0) – Game summary

Quarter	1	2	3	4	Total
Lumberjacks	7	7	0	10	24
Wildcats	14	20	14	14	62

at Arizona Stadium • Tucson, AZ

- Date: September 2, 2017
- Game time: 8:00 p.m.
- Game weather: Partly cloudy, 85 °F (29 °C)
- Game attendance: 43,620
- Referee: Steve Strimling
- TV announcers (Pac-12 Network): Kate Scott (play-by-play), Glenn Parker (analyst)

Game information

First quarter

- (10:12) ARIZ – Shun Brown 66-yard punt return, Josh Pollack kick (Arizona 7–0)
- (9:26) NAU – Cory Young 58-yard run, Griffin Roehler kick (Drive: 3 plays, 65 yards, 0:46; Tied 7–7)
- (3:08) ARIZ – Nick Wilson 46-yard run, Josh Pollack kick (Drive: 5 plays, 58 yards, 1:47; Arizona 14–7)

Second quarter

- (11:38) ARIZ – Tony Ellison 43-yard pass from Brandon Dawkins, Josh Pollack kick (Drive: 2 plays, 53 yards, 0:24; Arizona 21–7)
- (6:48) NAU – Cory Young 7-yard run, Griffin Roehler kick (Drive: 12 plays, 75 yards, 4:50; Arizona 21–14)
- (3:49) ARIZ – Tyrell Johnson 55-yard run, Josh Pollack kick (Drive: 1 play, 55 yards, 0:11; Arizona 28–14)
- (0:21) ARIZ – Brandon Dawkins 10-yard run, kick failed (Drive: 6 plays, 52 yards, 2:12; Arizona 34–14)

Third quarter

- (13:56) ARIZ – Brandon Dawkins 66-yard run, Josh Pollack kick (Drive: 3 plays, 77 yards, 0:58; Arizona 41–14)
- (10:20) ARIZ – Zach Green 37-yard run, Josh Pollack kick (Drive: 5 plays, 89 yards, 1:32; Arizona 48–14)

Fourth quarter

- (14:25) NAU – Joe Logan 22-yard run, Griffin Roehler kick (Drive: 7 plays, 80 yards, 2:09; Arizona 48–21)
- (11:16) ARIZ – Brandon Leon 10-yard run, Josh Pollack kick (Drive: 6 plays, 40 yards, 2:58; Arizona 55–21)
- (7:17) NAU – Griffin Roehler 33-yard field goal (Drive: 13 plays, 60 yards, 3:59; Arizona 55–24)
- (3:55) ARIZ – Rhett Rodriguez 1-yard run, Lucas Havrisik kick (Drive: 6 plays, 79 yards, 3:17; Arizona 62–24)

Statistics	NAU	ARIZ
First downs	29	23
Total yards	562	595
Rushing yards	42–185	47–506
Passing yards	377	89
Passing: Comp–Att–Int	27–50–2	7–14–0
Time of possession	34:15	25:45

Team	Category	Player	Statistics
Northern Arizona	Passing	Case Cookus	21/38, 306 yards, 2 INT
Northern Arizona	Rushing	Cory Young	11 carries, 115 yards, 2 TD
Northern Arizona	Receiving	Elijah Marks	8 receptions, 147 yards
Arizona	Passing	Brandon Dawkins	7/13, 89 yards, TD
Arizona	Rushing	Brandon Dawkins	7 carries, 92 yards, 2 TD
Arizona	Receiving	Tony Ellison	5 receptions, 79 yards, TD

=== vs Houston ===
Houston Cougars (0–0) vs Arizona Wildcats (1–0) – Game summary

Quarter	1	2	3	4	Total
Cougars	3	14	2	0	19
Wildcats	3	7	3	3	16

at Arizona Stadium • Tucson, AZ

- Date: September 9, 2017
- Game time: 7:30 p.m.
- Game weather: Partly cloudy, 85 °F (29 °C)
- Game attendance: 43,334
- Referee: Michael Mothershed
- TV announcers (ESPNU): Clay Matvick (play-by-play), Kirk Morrison (analyst)

Game information

First quarter

- (9:33) HOU – Caden Novikoff 25-yard field goal (Drive: 9 plays, 55 yards, 2:24; Houston 3–0)
- (1:08) ARIZ – Josh Pollack 45-yard field goal (Drive: 12 plays, 52 yards, 4:25; Tied 3–3)

Second quarter

- (5:00) HOU – Linell Bonner 5-yard pass from Kyle Allen, Caden Novikoff kick (Drive: 8 plays, 80 yards, 3:26; Houston 10–3)
- (2:22) ARIZ – Zach Green 1-yard run, Josh Pollack kick (Drive: 8 plays, 75 yards, 2:38; Tied 10–10)
- (0:45) HOU – Dillon Birden 3-yard run, Caden Novikoff kick (Drive: 4 plays, 16 yards, 1:23; Houston 17–10)

Third quarter

- (10:53) HOU – Team safety (Houston 19–10)
- (1:48) ARIZ – Josh Pollack 21-yard field goal (Drive: 16 plays, 82 yards, 6:22; Houston 19–13)

Fourth quarter

- (8:32) ARIZ – Josh Pollack 42-yard field goal (Drive: 10 plays, 30 yards, 4:05; Tied 19–16)

Statistics	HOU	ARIZ
First downs	18	21
Total yards	383	371
Rushing yards	37–158	39–152
Passing yards	225	219
Passing: Comp–Att–Int	25–32–2	22–37–1
Time of possession	29:23	30:37

Team	Category	Player	Statistics
Houston	Passing	Kyle Allen	25/32, 225 yards, TD, 2 INT
Houston	Rushing	Dillon Birden	14 carries, 83 yards, TD
Houston	Receiving	Steven Dunbar	6 receptions, 72 yards
Arizona	Passing	Brandon Dawkins	17/29, 178 yards
Arizona	Rushing	J.J. Taylor	17 carries, 87 yards
Arizona	Receiving	Shun Brown	4 receptions, 79 yards

=== at UTEP ===
Arizona Wildcats (1–1) at UTEP Miners (0–2) – Game summary

Quarter	1	2	3	4	Total
Wildcats	0	35	14	14	63
Miners	0	9	7	0	16

at Sun Bowl • El Paso, TX

- Date: September 15, 2017
- Game time: 7:15 p.m.
- Game weather: Breezy, 85 °F (29 °C)
- Game attendance: 22,133
- Referee: Dan Gautreaux
- TV announcers (ESPN): Adam Amin (play-by-play), Dusty Dvoracek (analyst), Molly McGrath (sideline reporter)

Game information

First quarter

No scoring plays

Second quarter

- (14:57) ARIZ – J.J. Taylor 2-yard pass from Brandon Dawkins, Josh Pollack kick (Drive: 12 plays, 78 yards, 4:07; Arizona 7–0)
- (9:45) ARIZ – Shun Brown 36-yard pass from Brandon Dawkins, Josh Pollack kick (Drive: 8 plays, 86 yards, 3:39; Arizona 14–0)
- (7:24) ARIZ – Brandon Dawkins 5-yard run, Josh Pollack kick (Drive: 5 plays, 27 yards, 2:07; Arizona 21–0)
- (5:34) ARIZ – Shun Brown 63-yard punt return, Josh Pollack kick (Arizona 28–0)
- (2:50) UTEP – Tyler Batson 9-yard pass from Zack Greenlee, kick failed (Drive: 5 plays, 66 yards, 2:37; Arizona 28–6)
- (0:36) ARIZ – Brandon Dawkins 3-yard run, Josh Pollack kick (Drive: 3 plays, 5 yards, 1:42; Arizona 35–6)
- (0:00) UTEP – Brady Viles 53-yard field goal (Drive: 6 plays, 34 yards, 0:35; Arizona 35–9)

Third quarter

- (12:10) ARIZ – Brandon Dawkins 13-yard run, Josh Pollack kick (Drive: 10 plays, 75 yards, 2:50; Arizona 42–9)
- (9:54) UTEP – Mark Torrez 6-yard run, Brady Viles kick (Drive: 4 plays, 76 yards, 2:11; Arizona 42–16)
- (3:56) ARIZ – Bryce Wolma 1-yard pass from Brandon Dawkins, Josh Pollack kick (Drive: 7 plays, 65 yards, 3:34; Arizona 49–16)

Fourth quarter

- (10:56) ARIZ – Nathan Tilford 2-yard run, Josh Pollack kick (Drive: 13 plays, 56 yards, 6:51; Arizona 56–16)
- (2:10) ARIZ – Nathan Tilford 14-yard run, Lucas Havrisik kick (Drive: 7 plays, 53 yards, 3:07; Arizona 63–16)

Statistics	ARIZ	UTEP
First downs	29	12
Total yards	501	218
Rushing yards	65–326	14–17
Passing yards	175	201
Passing: Comp–Att–Int	20–23–0	18–39–1
Time of possession	38:37	21:23

Team	Category	Player	Statistics
Arizona	Passing	Brandon Dawkins	18/21, 155 yards, 3 TD
Arizona	Rushing	Brandon Dawkins	14 carries, 133 yards, 3 TD
Arizona	Receiving	Tyrell Johnson	4 receptions, 45 yards
UTEP	Passing	Zack Greenlee	11/17, 104 yards, TD, INT
UTEP	Rushing	Kevin Dove	5 carries, 17 yards
UTEP	Receiving	Terry Juniel	4 receptions, 82 yards

=== vs No. 23 Utah ===
No. 23 Utah Utes (3–0) vs Arizona Wildcats (2–1) – Game summary

Quarter	1	2	3	4	Total
#23 Utes	10	3	14	3	30
Wildcats	3	7	7	7	24

at Arizona Stadium • Tucson, AZ

- Date: September 22, 2017
- Game time: 7:30 p.m.
- Game weather: Partly cloudy, 84 °F (29 °C)
- Game attendance: 36,651
- Referee: Kevin Mar
- TV announcers (FS1): Brian Custer (play-by-play), Ben Leber (analyst), Jennifer Hale (sideline reporter)

Game information

First quarter

- (10:35) UTAH – Samson Nacua 8-yard pass from Tyler Huntley, Matt Gay kick (Drive: 6 plays, 73 yards, 2:26; Utah 7–0)
- (6:54) ARIZ – Josh Pollack 32-yard field goal (Drive: 12 plays, 60 yards, 3:41; Utah 7–3)
- (0:28) UTAH – Matt Gay 41-yard field goal (Drive: 4 plays, 5 yards, 2:01; Utah 10–3)

Second quarter

- (5:39) UTAH – Matt Gay 26-yard field goal (Drive: 14 plays, 85 yards, 6:20; Utah 13–3)
- (1:39) ARIZ – Brandon Dawkins 1-yard run, Josh Pollack kick (Drive: 11 plays, 75 yards, 4:00; Utah 13–10)

Third quarter

- (9:46) UTAH – Troy Williams 1-yard run, Matt Gay kick (Drive: 10 plays, 75 yards, 5:14; Utah 20–10)
- (4:38) ARIZ – J.J. Taylor 7-yard run, Josh Pollack kick (Drive: 6 plays, 68 yards, 1:45; Utah 20–17)
- (2:03) UTAH – Javelin Guidry 14-yard interception return, Matt Gay kick (Utah 27–17)

Fourth quarter

- (4:58) UTAH – Matt Gay 37-yard field goal (Drive: 8 plays, 52 yards, 4:32; Utah 30–17)
- (2:44) ARIZ – Tony Ellison 30-yard pass from Brandon Dawkins, Josh Pollack kick (Drive: 7 plays, 75 yards, 2:14; Utah 30–24)

Statistics	UTAH	ARIZ
First downs	21	24
Total yards	341	448
Rushing yards	38–112	42–200
Passing yards	229	248
Passing: Comp–Att–Int	17–28–0	24–42–3
Time of possession	30:50	29:10

Team	Category	Player	Statistics
Utah	Passing	Troy Williams	9/18, 131 yards
Utah	Rushing	Zack Moss	14 carries, 73 yards
Utah	Receiving	Darren Carrington	4 receptions, 76 yards
Arizona	Passing	Brandon Dawkins	24/42, 248 yards, TD, 3 INT
Arizona	Rushing	Brandon Dawkins	18 carries, 90 yards, TD
Arizona	Receiving	Tony Ellison	6 receptions, 78 yards, TD

=== at Colorado ===
Arizona Wildcats (2–2) at Colorado Buffaloes (3–2) – Game summary

Quarter	1	2	3	4	Total
Wildcats	14	7	14	10	45
Buffaloes	7	7	7	21	42

at Folsom Field • Boulder, CO

- Date: October 7, 2017
- Game time: 5:00 p.m.
- Game weather: Clear, 75 °F (24 °C)
- Game attendance: 49,976
- Referee: Mark Duddy
- TV announcers (Pac-12 Network): J.B. Long (play-by-play), Yogi Roth (analyst), Jill Savage (sideline reporter)

Game information

First quarter

- (8:59) ARIZ – Khalil Tate 58-yard run, Josh Pollack kick (Drive: 1 play, 58 yards, 0:11; Arizona 7–0)
- (4:33) COLO – Phillip Lindsay 5-yard run, James Stefanou kick (Drive: 10 plays, 75 yards, 4:26; Tied 7–7)
- (2:13) ARIZ – Khalil Tate 28-yard run, Josh Pollack kick (Drive: 6 plays, 75 yards, 2:20; Arizona 14–7)

Second quarter

- (2:24) COLO – Phillip Lindsay 1-yard run, James Stefanou kick (Drive: 19 plays, 85 yards, 9:34; Tied 14–14)
- (1:21) ARIZ – Shun Brown 13-yard pass from Khalil Tate, Josh Pollack kick (Drive: 3 plays, 68 yards, 0:56; Arizona 21–14)

Third quarter

- (12:21) ARIZ – Khalil Tate 47-yard run, Josh Pollack kick (Drive: 4 plays, 70 yards, 1:16; Arizona 28–14)
- (7:13) COLO – Bryce Bobo 7-yard pass from Steven Montez, James Stefanou kick (Drive: 15 plays, 75 yards, 5:08; Arizona 28–21)
- (1:51) ARIZ – Zach Green 1-yard run, Josh Pollack kick (Drive: 12 plays, 75 yards, 5:22; Arizona 35–21)

Fourth quarter

- (13:21) COLO – Chris Bounds 2-yard pass from Steven Montez, James Stefanou kick (Drive: 10 plays, 75 yards, 3:30; Arizona 35–28)
- (13:06) ARIZ – Khalil Tate 75-yard run, Josh Pollack kick (Drive: 1 play, 75 yards, 0:15; Arizona 42–28)
- (11:02) COLO – Chris Bounds 39-yard pass from Steven Montez, James Stefanou kick (Drive: 6 plays, 75 yards, 2:04; Arizona 42–35)
- (8:06) ARIZ – Josh Pollack 24-yard field goal (Drive: 6 plays, 68 yards, 2:56; Arizona 45–35)
- (5:04) COLO – Phillip Lindsay 11-yard run, James Stefanou kick (Drive: 9 plays, 75 yards, 3:02; Arizona 45–42)

Statistics	ARIZ	COLO
First downs	25	29
Total yards	567	551
Rushing yards	42–413	58–300
Passing yards	154	251
Passing: Comp–Att–Int	12–14–0	19–32–0
Time of possession	24:06	35:54

Team	Category	Player	Statistics
Arizona	Passing	Khalil Tate	12/13, 154 yards, TD
Arizona	Rushing	Khalil Tate	14 carries, 327 yards, 4 TD
Arizona	Receiving	Tony Ellison	1 reception, 60 yards
Colorado	Passing	Steven Montez	19/32, 251 yards, 3 TD
Colorado	Rushing	Phillip Lindsay	41 carries, 281 yards, 3 TD
Colorado	Receiving	Jay MacIntyre	3 receptions, 57 yards

=== vs UCLA ===
UCLA Bruins (3–2) vs Arizona Wildcats (3–2) – Game summary

Quarter	1	2	3	4	Total
Bruins	7	7	16	0	30
Wildcats	17	13	10	7	47

at Arizona Stadium • Tucson, AZ

- Date: October 14, 2017
- Game time: 6:00 p.m.
- Game weather: Clear, 86 °F (30 °C)
- Game attendance: 48,380
- Referee: Steve Strimling
- TV announcers (Pac-12 Network): Roxy Bernstein (play-by-play), Anthony Herron (analyst), Lewis Johnson (sideline reporter)

Game information

First quarter

- (13:44) ARIZ – Khalil Tate 45-yard run, Josh Pollack kick (Drive: 4 plays, 75 yards, 1:16; Arizona 7–0)
- (7:04) ARIZ – Josh Pollack 36-yard field goal (Drive: 6 plays, 24 yards, 2:39; Arizona 10–0)
- (2:23) UCLA – Jalen Starks 1-yard run, JJ Molson kick (Drive: 13 plays, 75 yards, 4:41; Arizona 10–7)
- (0:39) ARIZ – Nick Wilson 1-yard run, Josh Pollack kick (Drive: 5 plays, 75 yards, 1:44; Arizona 17–7)

Second quarter

- (8:03) ARIZ – Jace Whittaker 42-yard interception return, Josh Pollack kick (Arizona 24–7)
- (4:07) UCLA – Soso Jamabo 9-yard run, JJ Molson kick (Drive: 12 plays, 75 yards, 3:56; Arizona 24–14)
- (0:11) ARIZ – Trevor Wood 6-yard pass from Khalil Tate, kick failed (Drive: 10 plays, 75 yards, 3:48; Arizona 30–14)

Third quarter

- (5:06) ARIZ – Josh Pollack 23-yard field goal (Drive: 9 plays, 55 yards, 3:52; Arizona 33–14)
- (4:20) UCLA – Bolu Olorunfunmi 4-yard run, Josh Rosen two-point pass to Jordan Lasley (Drive: 3 plays, 75 yards, 0:46; Arizona 33–22)
- (3:36) ARIZ – Khalil Tate 71-yard run, Josh Pollack kick (Drive: 2 plays, 75 yards, 0:44; Arizona 40–22)
- (1:04) UCLA – Bolu Olorunfunmi 1-yard run, Josh Rosen two-point pass to Soso Jamabo (Drive: 6 plays, 65 yards, 2:32; Arizona 40–30)

Fourth quarter

- (12:25) ARIZ – Nick Wilson 6-yard run, Josh Pollack kick (Drive: 8 plays, 75 yards, 3:39; Arizona 47–30)

Statistics	UCLA	ARIZ
First downs	28	27
Total yards	409	605
Rushing yards	38–190	61–457
Passing yards	219	148
Passing: Comp–Att–Int	20–34–3	9–13–0
Time of possession	25:54	34:06

Team	Category	Player	Statistics
UCLA	Passing	Josh Rosen	20/34, 219 yards, 3 INT
UCLA	Rushing	Bolu Olorunfunmi	10 carries, 102 yards, 2 TD
UCLA	Receiving	Jordan Lasley	6 receptions, 77 yards
Arizona	Passing	Khalil Tate	9/13, 148 yards, TD
Arizona	Rushing	Khalil Tate	15 carries, 230 yards, 2 TD
Arizona	Receiving	Shun Brown	3 receptions, 61 yards

=== at California ===
Arizona Wildcats (4–2) at California Golden Bears (4–3) – Game summary

Quarter	1	2	3	4	OT	2OT	Total
Wildcats	14	7	7	3	7	7	45
Golden Bears	7	0	14	10	7	6	44

at California Memorial Stadium • Berkeley, CA

- Date: October 21, 2017
- Game time: 4:00 p.m.
- Game weather: Clear, 68 °F (20 °C)
- Game attendance: 37,525
- Referee: Michael Mothershed
- TV announcers (Pac-12 Network): Ted Robinson (play by play), Yogi Roth (analyst), Jill Savage (sideline reporter)

Game information

First quarter

- (8:51) CAL – Patrick Laird 8-yard run, Matt Anderson kick (Drive: 11 plays, 66 yards, 4:25; California 7–0)
- (7:32) ARIZ – J.J. Taylor 30-yard run, Josh Pollack kick (Drive: 5 plays, 75 yards, 1:19; Tied 7–7)
- (3:22) ARIZ – Khalil Tate 76-yard run, Josh Pollack kick (Drive: 2 plays, 80 yards, 0:37; Arizona 14–7)

Second quarter

- (11:20) ARIZ – Zach Green 13-yard run, Josh Pollack kick (Drive: 5 plays, 69 yards, 2:21; Arizona 21–7)

Third quarter

- (9:00) CAL – Malik McMorris 8-yard pass from Ross Bowers, Matt Anderson kick (Drive: 13 plays, 79 yards, 5:54; Arizona 21–14)
- (7:32) ARIZ – Shun Brown 56-yard pass from Khalil Tate, Josh Pollack kick (Drive: 4 plays, 71 yards, 1:28; Arizona 28–14)
- (2:42) CAL – Ross Bowers 4-yard run, Matt Anderson kick (Drive: 11 plays, 56 yards, 4:41; Arizona 28–21)

Fourth quarter

- (10:36) CAL – Patrick Laird 18-yard run, Matt Anderson kick (Drive: 11 plays, 80 yards, 3:07; Tied 28–28)
- (5:07) ARIZ – Josh Pollack 36-yard field goal (Drive: 11 plays, 63 yards, 5:23; Arizona 31–28)
- (1:41) CAL – Matt Anderson 52-yard field goal (Drive: 8 plays, 38 yards, 3:22; Tied 31–31)

First overtime

- CAL – Kanawai Noa 13-yard pass from Ross Bowers, Matt Anderson kick (Drive: 5 plays, 25 yards; California 38–31)
- ARIZ – Zach Green 25-yard run, Josh Pollack kick (Drive: 1 play, 25 yards; Tied 38–38)

Second overtime

- ARIZ – Bryce Wolma 22-yard pass from Khalil Tate, Josh Pollack kick (Drive: 2 plays, 25 yards; Arizona 45–38)
- CAL – Vic Enwere 1-yard run, Matt Anderson kick (Drive: 6 plays, 25 yards; Arizona 45–44)

Statistics	ARIZ	CAL
First downs	24	31
Total yards	511	473
Rushing yards	46–345	47–172
Passing yards	166	301
Passing: Comp–Att–Int	10–15–1	29–49–2
Time of possession	25:00	35:00

Team	Category	Player	Statistics
Arizona	Passing	Khalil Tate	10/15, 166 yards, 2 TD, INT
Arizona	Rushing	Khalil Tate	17 carries, 137 yards, TD
Arizona	Receiving	Shun Brown	2 receptions, 57 yards, TD
California	Passing	Ross Bowers	29/49, 301 yards, 2 TD, 2 INT
California	Rushing	Patrick Laird	28 carries,130 yards, 2 TD
California	Receiving	Vic Wharton III	8 receptions, 96 yards

=== vs No. 15 Washington State ===
No. 15 Washington State Cougars (7–1) vs Arizona Wildcats (5–2) – Game summary

Quarter	1	2	3	4	Total
#15 Cougars	7	7	13	10	37
Wildcats	10	13	14	21	58

at Arizona Stadium • Tucson, AZ

- Date: October 28, 2017
- Game time: 6:30 p.m.
- Game weather: Spotlessly Clear, 81 °F (27 °C)
- Game attendance: 42,822
- Referee: Terry Leyden
- TV announcers (Pac-12 Network): Roxy Bernstein (play-by-play), Anthony Herron (analyst), Lewis Johnson (sideline reporter)

Game information

First quarter

- (11:21) ARIZ – Josh Pollack 30-yard field goal (Drive: 8 plays, 62 yards, 3:39; Arizona 3–0)
- (9:04) ARIZ – Jamie Nunley 48-yard pass from Khalil Tate, Josh Pollack kick (Drive: 4 plays, 65 yards, 1:22; Arizona 10–0)
- (5:28) WSU – Isaiah Johnson-Mack 1-yard pass from Luke Falk, Erik Powell kick (Drive: 6 plays, 25 yards, 2:05; Arizona 10–7)

Second quarter

- (7:16) ARIZ – Shun Brown 17-yard pass from Khalil Tate, Josh Pollack kick (Drive: 2 plays, 58 yards, 0:28; Arizona 17–7)
- (2:56) ARIZ – Josh Pollack 25-yard field goal (Drive: 6 plays, 76 yards, 2:34; Arizona 20–7)
- (0:10) WSU – Tyler Hilinski 6-yard run, Erik Powell kick (Drive: 9 plays, 75 yards, 2:46; Arizona 20–14)
- (0:00) ARIZ – Lucas Havrisik 57-yard field goal (Drive: 1 play, 0 yards, 0:01; Arizona 23–14)

Third quarter

- (11:02) WSU – Tay Martin 8-yard pass from Tyler Hilinski, kick failed (Drive: 4 plays, 37 yards, 1:17; Arizona 23–20)
- (8:06) WSU – Tyler Hilinski 1-yard run, Erik Powell kick (Drive: 6 plays, 29 yards, 2:13; Washington State 27–23)
- (7:35) ARIZ – J.J. Taylor 3-yard run, Josh Pollack kick (Drive: 2 plays, 65 yards, 0:25; Arizona 30–27)
- (2:53) ARIZ – J.J. Taylor 79-yard run, Josh Pollack kick (Drive: 2 plays, 80 yards, 0:45; Arizona 37–27)

Fourth quarter

- (14:04) WSU – Erik Powell 56-yard field goal (Drive: 10 plays, 36 yards, 3:49; Arizona 37–30)
- (12:50) ARIZ – Khalil Tate 49-yard run, Josh Pollack kick (Drive: 3 plays, 75 yards, 1:08; Arizona 44–30)
- (11:11) ARIZ – Colin Schooler 66-yard interception return, Josh Pollack kick (Arizona 51–30)
- (9:46) WSU – Tay Martin 49-yard pass from Tyler Hilinski, Erik Powell kick (Drive: 4 plays, 75 yards, 1:25; Arizona 51–37)
- (6:51) ARIZ – Zach Green 1-yard run, Josh Pollack kick (Drive: 5 plays, 75 yards, 2:48; Arizona 58–37)

Statistics	WSU	ARIZ
First downs	32	13
Total yards	653	585
Rushing yards	17–51	34–310
Passing yards	602	275
Passing: Comp–Att–Int	58–84–4	10–17–1
Time of possession	38:53	21:07

Team	Category	Player	Statistics
Washington State	Passing	Tyler Hilinski	45/61, 509 yards, 2 TD, 4 INT
Washington State	Rushing	James Williams	6 carries, 28 yards
Washington State	Receiving	Tavares Martin Jr.	11 receptions, 136 yards
Arizona	Passing	Khalil Tate	10/17, 275 yards, 2 TD, INT
Arizona	Rushing	J.J. Taylor	14 carries, 153 yards, 2 TD
Arizona	Receiving	Jamie Nunley	2 receptions, 116 yards, TD

=== at No. 17 USC ===
No. 22 Arizona Wildcats (6–2) at No. 17 USC Trojans (7–2) – Game summary

Quarter	1	2	3	4	Total
#22 Wildcats	0	6	14	15	35
#17 Trojans	7	14	7	21	49

at Los Angeles Memorial Coliseum • Los Angeles, CA

- Date: November 4, 2017
- Game time: 7:45 p.m.
- Game weather: Mostly clear skies, 64 °F (18 °C)
- Game attendance: 70,225
- Referee: Mark Duddy
- TV announcers (ESPN): Mark Jones (play-by-play), Rod Gilmore (analyst), Quint Kessenich (sideline reporter)

Game information

First quarter

- (9:28) USC – Jalen Greene 11-yard blocked punt return, Chase McGrath kick (USC 7–0)

Second quarter

- (14:17) ARIZ – Lucas Havrisik 45-yard field goal (Drive: 11 plays, 53 yards, 4:03; USC 7–3)
- (8:50) USC – Tyler Vaughns 22-yard pass from Sam Darnold, Chase McGrath kick (Drive: 11 plays, 67 yards, 5:21; USC 14–3)
- (6:04) USC – Steve Mitchell 27-yard pass from Sam Darnold, Chase McGrath kick (Drive: 4 plays, 48 yards, 1:33; USC 21–3)
- (2:14) ARIZ – Lucas Havrisik 43-yard field goal (Drive: 10 plays, 38 yards, 3:44; USC 21–6)

Third quarter

- (6:04) USC – Ronald Jones II 5-yard run, Chase McGrath kick (Drive: 2 plays, 46 yards, 0:21; USC 28–6)
- (4:30) ARIZ – Khalil Tate 32-yard run, Josh Pollack kick (Drive: 6 plays, 75 yards, 1:34; USC 28–13)
- (1:17) ARIZ – Shun Brown 30-yard pass from Khalil Tate, Josh Pollack kick (Drive: 5 plays, 57 yards, 0:59; USC 28–20)

Fourth quarter

- (13:56) USC – Aca'Cedric Ware 42-yard run, Chase McGrath kick (Drive: 6 plays, 75 yards, 2:21; USC 35–20)
- (12:19) ARIZ – J.J. Taylor 16-yard pass from Khalil Tate, Josh Pollack kick (Drive: 4 plays, 75 yards, 1:37; USC 35–27)
- (8:23) ARIZ – Zach Green 3-yard run, Khalil Tate two-point pass to Tony Ellison (Drive: 6 plays, 47 yards, 2:19; USC 35–35)
- (5:37) USC – Ronald Jones II 1-yard run, Chase McGrath kick (Drive: 7 plays, 72 yards, 2:41; USC 42–35)
- (3:09) USC – Ronald Jones II 1-yard run, Chase McGrath kick (Drive: 5 plays, 69 yards, 2:14; USC 49–35)

Statistics	ARIZ	USC
First downs	25	30
Total yards	380	642
Rushing yards	43–234	52–331
Passing yards	146	311
Passing: Comp–Att–Int	14–31–2	20–26–1
Time of possession	26:05	33:55

Team	Category	Player	Statistics
Arizona	Passing	Khalil Tate	14/31, 146 yards, 2 TD, 2 INT
Arizona	Rushing	Khalil Tate	26 carries, 161 yards, TD
Arizona	Receiving	Shun Brown	8 receptions, 78 yards, TD
USC	Passing	Sam Darnold	20/26, 311 yards, 2 TD, INT
USC	Rushing	Ronald Jones II	27 carries, 194 yards, 3 TD
USC	Receiving	Michael Pittman Jr.	3 receptions, 59 yards

=== vs Oregon State ===
Oregon State Beavers (1–8) vs Arizona Wildcats (6–3) – Game summary

Quarter	1	2	3	4	Total
Beavers	0	0	14	14	28
Wildcats	14	14	14	7	49

at Arizona Stadium • Tucson, AZ

- Date: November 11, 2017
- Game time: 9:00 p.m.
- Game weather: Clear, 68 °F (20 °C)
- Game attendance: 40,984
- Referee: Kevin Mar
- TV announcers (ESPN2): Mark Jones (play-by-play), Rod Gilmore (analyst), Quint Kessenich (sideline reporter)

Game information

First quarter

- (11:10) ARIZ – Nick Wilson 1-yard run, Josh Pollack kick (Drive: 11 plays, 75 yards, 3:50; Arizona 7–0)
- (0:25) ARIZ – Zach Green 4-yard run, Josh Pollack kick (Drive: 10 plays, 85 yards, 3:24; Arizona 14–0)

Second quarter

- (9:01) ARIZ – Khalil Tate 19-yard run, Josh Pollack kick (Drive: 8 plays, 78 yards, 3:07; Arizona 21–0)
- (1:11) ARIZ – Tony Ellison 27-yard run, Josh Pollack kick (Drive: 5 plays, 85 yards, 2:04; Arizona 28–0)

Third quarter

- (10:16) OSU – Noah Togiai 15-yard pass from Darell Garretson, Jordan Choukair kick (Drive: 9 plays, 65 yards, 4:44; Arizona 28–7)
- (9:39) ARIZ – Khalil Tate 71-yard run, Josh Pollack kick (Drive: 2 plays, 75 yards, 0:37; Arizona 35–7)
- (5:54) OSU – Isaiah Hodgins 6-yard pass from Darell Garretson, Jordan Choukair kick (Drive: 8 plays, 75 yards, 3:45; Arizona 35–14)
- (0:32) ARIZ – Zach Green 3-yard run, Josh Pollack kick (Drive: 5 plays, 34 yards, 2:03; Arizona 42–14)

Fourth quarter

- (10:44) OSU – Timmy Hernandez 15-yard pass from Darell Garretson, Jordan Choukair kick (Drive: 10 plays, 75 yards, 4:49; Arizona 42–21)
- (6:33) ARIZ – Brandon Dawkins 4-yard run, Josh Pollack kick (Drive: 7 plays, 75 yards, 4:11; Arizona 49–21)
- (3:22) OSU – Ryan Nall 44-yard pass from Darell Garretson, Jordan Choukair kick (Drive: 7 plays, 75 yards, 3:11; Arizona 49–28)

Statistics	OSU	ARIZ
First downs	22	26
Total yards	360	602
Rushing yards	40–151	55–534
Passing yards	209	68
Passing: Comp–Att–Int	16–28–1	5–7–1
Time of possession	33:49	26:11

Team	Category	Player	Statistics
Oregon State	Passing	Darell Garretson	16/28, 209 yards, 4 TD, INT
Oregon State	Rushing	Ryan Nall	22 carries, 95 yards
Oregon State	Receiving	Noah Togiai	3 receptions, 56 yards, TD
Arizona	Passing	Khalil Tate	5/7, 68 yards, INT
Arizona	Rushing	Khalil Tate	16 carries, 206 yards, 2 TD
Arizona	Receiving	Tyrell Johnson	3 receptions, 44 yards

=== at Oregon ===
Arizona Wildcats (7–3) at Oregon Ducks (5–5) – Game summary

Quarter	1	2	3	4	Total
Wildcats	7	14	7	0	28
Ducks	14	14	7	13	48

at Autzen Stadium • Eugene, OR

- Date: November 18, 2017
- Game time: 5:00 p.m.
- Game weather: Mostly Cloudy, 45 °F (7 °C)
- Game attendance: 51,799
- Referee: Steve Strimling
- TV announcers (Pac-12 Network): Roxy Bernstein (play-by-play), Anthony Herron (analyst), Lewis Johnson (sideline reporter)

Game information

First quarter

- (7:41) ARIZ – Nick Wilson 18-yard run, Josh Pollack kick (Drive: 11 plays, 83 yards, 4:51; Arizona 7–0)
- (5:20) ORE – Justin Herbert 40-yard run, Aidan Schneider kick (Drive: 7 plays, 75 yards, 2:21; Tied 7–7)
- (3:10) ORE – Royce Freeman 4-yard run, Aidan Schneider kick (Drive: 6 plays, 46 yards, 1:06; Oregon 14–7)

Second quarter

- (13:13) ARIZ – Tony Ellison 15-yard pass from Khalil Tate, Josh Pollack kick (Drive: 3 plays, 19 yards, 0:58; Tied 14–14)
- (9:08) ARIZ – Nick Wilson 29-yard run, Josh Pollack kick (Drive: 5 plays, 59 yards, 2:06; Arizona 21–14)
- (6:59) ORE – Jacob Breeland 39-yard pass from Justin Herbert, Aidan Schneider kick (Drive: 7 plays, 75 yards, 2:09; Tied 21–21)
- (1:32) ORE – Royce Freeman 28-yard run, Aidan Schneider kick (Drive: 5 plays, 88 yards, 1:43; Oregon 28–21)

Third quarter

- (6:56) ORE – Royce Freeman 11-yard run, Aidan Schneider kick (Drive: 10 plays, 94 yards, 4:00; Oregon 35–21)
- (3:47) ARIZ – Zach Green 2-yard run, Josh Pollack kick (Drive: 8 plays, 75 yards, 3:09; Oregon 35–28)

Fourth quarter

- (14:54) ORE – Aidan Schneider 40-yard field goal (Drive: 9 plays, 52 yards, 3:53; Oregon 38–28)
- (13:54) ORE – Royce Freeman 1-yard run, Aidan Schneider kick (Drive: 2 plays, 51 yards, 0:15; Oregon 45–28)
- (8:09) ORE – Aidan Schneider 24-yard field goal (Drive: 11 plays, 45 yards, 3:30; Oregon 48–28)

Statistics	ARIZ	ORE
First downs	27	24
Total yards	330	588
Rushing yards	45–171	50–353
Passing yards	159	235
Passing: Comp–Att–Int	18–35–2	14–21–1
Time of possession	31:22	28:38

Team	Category	Player	Statistics
Arizona	Passing	Khalil Tate	18/35, 159 yards, TD, 2 INT
Arizona	Rushing	Nick Wilson	17 carries, 73 yards, 2 TD
Arizona	Receiving	Tony Ellison	6 receptions, 52 yards, TD
Oregon	Passing	Justin Herbert	14/21, 235 yards, TD, INT
Oregon	Rushing	Royce Freeman	19 carries, 135 yards, 4 TD
Oregon	Receiving	Charles Nelson	4 receptions, 74 yards

=== at Arizona State ===
Arizona Wildcats (7–4) at Arizona State Sun Devils (6–5) – Game summary

Quarter	1	2	3	4	Total
Wildcats	14	10	0	6	30
Sun Devils	7	7	21	7	42

at Sun Devil Stadium • Tempe, AZ

- Date: November 25, 2017
- Game time: 5:00 p.m.
- Game weather: Partly Cloudy, 84 °F (29 °C)
- Game attendance: 59,385
- Referee: Michael Mothershed
- TV announcers (Pac-12 Network): Roxy Bernstein (play-by-play), Yogi Roth (analyst), Jill Savage (sideline reporter)

Game information

First quarter

- (8:43) ARIZ – Zach Green 1-yard run, Josh Pollack kick (Drive: 10 plays, 73 yards, 4:29; Arizona 7–0)
- (4:38) ARIZ – Khalil Tate 1-yard run, Josh Pollack kick (Drive: 6 plays, 50 yards, 2:07; Arizona 14–7)
- (1:16) ASU – Kyle Williams 18-yard pass from Manny Wilkins, Brandon Ruiz kick (Drive: 9 plays, 87 yards, 3:17; Arizona 14–7)

Second quarter

- (9:36) ARIZ – Josh Pollack 24-yard field goal (Drive: 13 plays, 68 yards, 6:40; Arizona 17–7)
- (5:45) ASU – Kalen Ballage 1-yard run, Brandon Ruiz kick (Drive: 9 plays, 75 yards, 3:51; Arizona 17–14)
- (3:43) ARIZ – J.J. Taylor 15-yard run, Josh Pollack kick (Drive: 5 plays, 75 yards, 2:02; Arizona 24–14)

Third quarter

- (12:45) ASU – Demario Richard 1-yard run, Brandon Ruiz kick (Drive: 2 plays, 5 yards, 0:27; Arizona 24–21)
- (8:50) ASU – N'Keal Harry 5-yard pass from Manny Wilkins, Brandon Ruiz kick (Drive: 8 plays, 30 yards, 2:53; Arizona State 28–24)
- (2:18) ASU – Demario Richard 6-yard run, Brandon Ruiz kick (Drive: 8 plays, 75 yards, 3:16; Arizona State 35–24)

Fourth quarter

- (13:04) ARIZ – Brandon Dawkins 50-yard run, two-point pass failed (Drive: 6 plays, 86 yards, 2:13; Arizona State 35–30)
- (4:51) ASU – N'Keal Harry 9-yard pass from Manny Wilkins, Brandon Ruiz kick (Drive: 9 plays, 33 yards, 3:52; Arizona State 42–30)

Statistics	ARIZ	ASU
First downs	24	18
Total yards	439	390
Rushing yards	51–245	49–227
Passing yards	194	163
Passing: Comp–Att–Int	15–21–1	11–17–1
Time of possession	32:07	27:53

Team	Category	Player	Statistics
Arizona	Passing	Khalil Tate	11/13, 132 yards
Arizona	Rushing	J.J. Taylor	12 carries, 74 yards, TD
Arizona	Receiving	Shawn Poindexter	2 receptions, 53 yards
Arizona State	Passing	Manny Wilkins	11/17, 163 yards, 3 TD, INT
Arizona State	Rushing	Demario Richard	22 carries, 165 yards, 2 TD
Arizona State	Receiving	Frank Darby	1 reception, 48 yards

=== vs Purdue (Foster Farms Bowl) ===
Arizona Wildcats (7–5) vs Purdue Boilermakers (6–6) – Game summary
(2017 Foster Farms Bowl)

Quarter	1	2	3	4	Total
Wildcats	14	0	14	7	35
Boilermakers	14	17	0	7	38

at Levi's Stadium • Santa Clara, CA

- Date: December 27, 2017
- Game time: 6:30 p.m
- Game weather: Mostly Cloudy, 55 °F (13 °C)
- Game attendance: 28,436
- Referee: Brad Van Vark
- TV announcers (Fox): Joe Davis (play-by-play), Brady Quinn (analyst), Bruce Feldman (sideline reporter)

Game information

First quarter

- (11:43) PUR – Anthony Mahoungou 31-yard pass from Elijah Sindelar, Spencer Evans kick (Drive: 6 plays, 60 yards, 1:24; Purdue 7–0)
- (6:43) ARIZ – Shawn Poindexter 31-yard pass from Khalil Tate, Josh Pollack kick (Drive: 4 plays, 68 yards, 1:00; Tied 7–7)
- (4:09) ARIZ – Tony Ellison 29-yard pass from Khalil Tate, Josh Pollack kick (Drive: 3 plays, 34 yards, 1:06; Arizona 14–7)
- (2:22) PUR – Gregory Phillips 42-yard pass from Elijah Sindelar, J.D. Dellinger kick (Drive: 5 plays, 75 yards, 1:47; Tied 14–14)

Second quarter

- (9:12) PUR – Gregory Phillips 22-yard pass from Elijah Sindelar, Spencer Evans kick (Drive: 13 plays, 90 yards, 5:04; Purdue 21–14)
- (4:11) PUR – D.J. Knox 13-yard run, J.D. Dellinger kick (Drive: 6 plays, 80 yards, 2:06; Purdue 28–14)
- (0:00) PUR – Spencer Evans 26-yard field goal (Drive: 7 plays, 59 yards, 0:56; Purdue 31–14)

Third quarter

- (8:53) ARIZ – Tony Ellison 40-yard pass from Khalil Tate, Josh Pollack kick (Drive: 7 plays, 72 yards, 3:21; Purdue 31–21)
- (6:31) ARIZ – Tyrell Johnson 40-yard pass from Khalil Tate, Josh Pollack kick (Drive: 4 plays, 51 yards, 1:27; Purdue 31–28)

Fourth quarter

- (3:21) ARIZ – Shun Brown 24-yard pass from Khalil Tate, Josh Pollack kick (Drive: 7 plays, 67 yards, 2:26; Arizona 35–31)
- (1:44) PUR – Anthony Mahoungou 38-yard pass from Elijah Sindelar, J.D. Dellinger kick (Drive: 8 plays, 75 yards, 1:37; Purdue 38–35)

Statistics	ARIZ	PUR
First downs	19	27
Total yards	430	555
Rushing yards	43–128	40–159
Passing yards	302	396
Passing: Comp–Att–Int	17–26–1	33–53–1
Time of possession	27:55	32:05

Team	Category	Player	Statistics
Arizona	Passing	Khalil Tate	17/26, 302 yards, 5 TD, INT
Arizona	Rushing	Khalil Tate	20 carries, 58 yards
Arizona	Receiving	Tony Ellison	4 receptions, 102 yards, 2 TD
Purdue	Passing	Elijah Sindelar	33/53, 396 yards, 4 TD, INT
Purdue	Rushing	D.J. Knox	11 carries, 101 yards, TD
Purdue	Receiving	Gregory Phillips	14 receptions, 149 yards, 2 TD

Purdue quarterback Elijah Sindelar was named Offensive MVP.

Purdue linebacker Ja'Whaun Bentley was named Defensive MVP.

== Rankings ==
Ranking movements Legend: ██ Increase in ranking ██ Decrease in ranking — = Not ranked RV = Received votes
	Week															
Poll	Pre	1	2	3	4	5	6	7	8	9	10	11	12	13	14	Final
AP	—	—	—	—	—	—	—	—	—	23	RV	RV	—	—	—	—
Coaches	RV	RV	—	—	—	—	—	—	RV	25	RV	RV	—	—	—	—
CFP	Not released									22	—	—	—	—	—	Not released

== Statistics ==
=== Team ===
As of 11/25/2017.

Team statistics
	Arizona	Opponents
Scoring & Efficiency
Points	360	242
Points per game	45.0	30.2
Points off Turnovers	54	30
Total Time Possession	28:33	31:27
First Downs	186	200
Rushing	104	70
Passing	59	108
Penalty	23	22
3rd–Down Conversions	42–99	55–124
3rd down PCT	42%	44%
4th–Down Conversions	10–13	10–18
4th down PCT	77%	56%
Red Zone Scores-Chances-PCT	30–34 (88%)	30–40 (75%)
Red Zone Touchdowns-PCT	22–34 (65%)	26–40 (65%)
Touchdown scores	47	31
Offense
Total Offense	4,183	3,583
Total Plays	551	639
Average per play	7.6	5.6
Average per game	552.9	447.9
Rushing Yards	2,079	1,178
Rushing Attempts	376	291
Average per rush	7.2	4.0
Average per game	338.6	147.2
Yard gained rushing	2,822	1,423
Yard lost rushing	113	245
Rushing TDs	32	19
Passing Yards	1,474	2,405
Comp–Att–INT	114–175–6	213–348–14
Average Per Pass	8.4	6.9
Average Per Catch	12.9	11.3
Average Per Game	184.2	300.6
Passing TDs	11	11
Defense
INT Returns: #–Yards–TD	14–233–2	6–59–0
Average Yards Per INT Return	16.6	9.8
Fumbles Returns: #–Yards–TD	1–9–0	1–6–0
Fumbles-Lost	8–7	10–5
QB Sacks: # – Yards	18–135	5–31
Safeties	0	1
Special Teams
Kickoffs: # – Yards	63–3,957	44–2,775
Average Per Kickoff	62.8	63.1
Net Kick Average	39.5	38.1
Punts: # – Yards	25–926	35–1,474
Average Per Punt	37.0	42.1
Net Punt Average	32.0	37.1
Kickoff Returns: #–Yards–TD	14–374–0	16–368–0
Average Yards Per Kickoff Return	26.7	23.0
Punt Returns: #–Yards–TD	9–154–2	8–107–0
Average Yards Per Punt Return	17.1	13.4
Penalties – Yards	43–427	65–604
Average per penalty game	53.4	75.5
PAT-Attempts	45–47 (96%)	26–28 (93%)
Field Goals-Attempts	11–16	8–12
Longest Field Goal	57	0
Onside kicks #: Recovered	1–1	0–0
Mis. yards	0	7

Non-conference opponents

	1	2	3	4	Total
All opponents	10	30	9	10	59
Arizona	17	62	31	31	141

Pac-12 opponents

	1	2	3	4	OT	Total
Pac-12 opponents	66	59	113	99	7	344
Arizona	93	91	87	76	14	361

Score total by Quarters

	1	2	3	4	OT	Total
All opponents	76	89	122	109	7	403
Arizona	110	153	118	107	14	502

=== Offense ===
Rushing

Name	GP	Att	Gain	Loss	Yards	Avg	TD	Long	Avg/G
#2 Tyrell Johnson	8	3	79	0	79 yards	26.3	1 TDs	55	8.4
#4 Rhett Rodriguez	2	4	13	14	-1 yards	-0.2	1 TDs	12	-0.5
#6 Shun Brown	8	1	22	0	22 yards	22.0	1 TDs	22	2.8
#13 Brandon Dawkins	5	56	397	39	358 yards	6.4	6 TDs	66	71.6
#14 Khalil Tate	6	69	960	34	1,087 yards	13.4	8 TDs	82	154.3
#25 J. J. Taylor	8	92	528	9	519 yards	5.6	4 TDs	79	64.9
#28 Nick Wilson	6	69	361	8	353 yards	5.1	3 TDs	46	58.8
#33 Nathan Tilford*	5	12	117	1	116 yards	9.7	2 TDs	65	23.2
#34 Zach Green	8	54	278	1	277 yards	5.1	6 TDs	37	39.6
#38 Brandon Leon	8	12	67	0	67 yards	5.6	1 TDs	10	9.9
TEAM	5	4	0	7	-7 yards	-1.8	0 TDs	0	-1.4
Total	8	376	2,822	113	2,709 yards	7.2	32 TDs	82	338.6

Passing

Name	GP	Att-Cmp-Int	QBR	Pct	Yds	TD	Lng	Avg/G
#4 Rhett Rodriguez	2	1–1–0	184.0	100%	10 yards	0 TDs	10	5.0
#13 Brandon Dawkins	5	42–63–0	125.2	62.3%	670 yards	5 TDs	43	134.0
#14 Khalil Tate	6	46–67–3	187.5	68.7%	784 yards	6 TDs	68	130.7
#15 Donovan Tate	2	1–1–0	184.0	100%	10 yards	0 TDs	10	5.0
Total	8	114–175–6	149.7	65.1%	1,474 yards	11 TDs	68	184.2

Receiving

Name	GP	Att	Yards	Avg	TD	Long	Avg/G
#2 Tyrell Johnson	8	13	155 yards	11.9	0 TDs	32	18.4
#3 Cam Denson	1	1	5 yards	5.0	0 TDs	5	5.0
#6 Shun Brown	8	24	353 yards	14.7	4 TDs	56	44.1
#8 Trevor Wood	5	1	6 yards	6.0	1 TDs	6	1.2
#9 Tony Ellison	8	22	395 yards	18.0	2 TDs	60	49.4
#18 Cedric Peterson	8	7	46 yards	6.6	0 TDs	14	7.7
#19 Shawn Poindexter	8	9	131 yards	14.6	0 TDs	43	16.4
#25 J. J. Taylor	8	7	17 yards	2.4	1 TDs	8	2.1
#28 Nick Wilson	6	1	6 yards	6.0	0 TDs	6	1.2
#81 Bryce Wolma	8	24	212 yards	8.8	2 TDs	22	26.5
#85 Jamie Nunley	6	4	138 yards	34.5	1 TDs	68	23.0
#92 Jack Banda	8	1	10 yards	10.0	0 TDs	10	1.2
Total	8	114	1,474 yards	12.9	11 TDs	68	184.2

=== Defense ===
Name	GP	Tackles				Sacks	Passing Defense		Interceptions				Fumbles		Blkd Kick
Name	GP	Solo	Ast	Total	TFL-Yds	No-Yds	BrUp	QBH	No.-Yds	Avg	TD	Long	Rcv-Yds	FF	Blkd Kick
#1 Tony Fields II*	6	22	15	37	3.0–27 yards	3.0–27 yards	0	0	0–0 yards	0.0	0 TDs	0	0–0	0	0
#2 Lorenzo Burns	6	28	9	37	0.5–2 yards	0–0 yards	3	0	1–0 yards	0.0	0 TDs	0	0–0	0	0
#4 Antonio Parks	6	4	0	4	0–0 yards	0–0 yards	1	0	0–0 yards	0.0	0 TDs	0	0–0	0	0
#5 Gavin Robertson Jr.	3	2	0	2	0–0 yards	0–0 yards	1	0	0–0 yards	0.0	0 TDs	0	0–0	0	0
#6 Demetrius Flannigan-Fowles	6	21	8	29	0–0 yards	0–0 yards	1	0	3–5 yards	0.0	0 TDs	0	2–0	0	0
#7 Colin Schooler*	6	21	5	26	3.0–11 yards	1.0–9 yards	0	0	1–53 yards	0.0	0 TDs	0	0–0	1	0
#8 Trevor Wood	4	0	1	1	0–0 yards	0–0 yards	0	0	0–0 yards	0.0	0 TDs	0	0–0	0	0
#9 Dane Cruikshank	6	21	5	26	3.0–5 yards	0–0 yards	0	0	1–1 yards	0.0	0 TDs	0	0–0	1	0
#10 Malcolm Holland	6	2	0	2	0–0 yards	0–0 yards	0	0	0–0 yards	0.0	0 TDs	0	0–0	0	0
#12 Joshua Brown	2	0	0	0	0–0 yards	0–0 yards	0	2	0–0 yards	0.0	0 TDs	0	0–0	0	0
#13 Chacho Ulloa	2	5	0	5	1.0–2 yards	0–0 yards	0	0	0–0 yards	0.0	0 TDs	0	0–0	0	0
#14 Kylan Wilborn*	6	19	0	19	7.0–54 yards	5.0–47 yards	1	0	0–0 yards	0.0	0 TDs	0	1–0	3	0
#15 Kwesi Mashack	6	6	0	6	2.0–3 yards	0–0 yards	0	0	0–0 yards	0.0	0 TDs	0	0–0	0	0
#16 Jake Glatting	6	0	1	1	0–0 yards	0–0 yards	0	0	0–0 yards	0.0	0 TDs	0	0–0	0	0
#17 Jace Whittaker	6	13	4	17	0.5–1 yards	0–0 yards	7	0	2–70 yards	0.0	1 TDs	0	0–0	0	0
#18 Brandon Rutt	6	13	8	21	1.5–3 yards	1.0–2 yards	0	0	0–0 yards	0.0	0 TDs	0	0–0	0	0
#19 Scottie Young Jr.*	6	22	10	32	3.0–7 yards	0–0 yards	0	0	0–0 yards	0.0	0 TDs	0	0–0	0	0
#19 Shawn Poindexter	6	1	0	1	0–0 yards	0–0 yards	0	0	0–0 yards	0.0	0 TDs	0	0–0	0	0
#25 J. J. Taylor	6	1	0	1	0–0 yards	0–0 yards	0	0	0–0 yards	0.0	0 TDs	0	0–0	0	0
#26 Anthony Pandy	4	3	0	3	1.0–5 yards	1.0–5 yards	0	0	0–0 yards	0.0	0 TDs	0	0–0	0	0
#27 Sammy Morrison	5	3	0	3	0–0 yards	0–0 yards	0	0	0–0 yards	0.0	0 TDs	0	0–0	0	0
#28 Carrington Vaughn	1	2	0	2	0–0 yards	0–0 yards	0	0	0–0 yards	0.0	0 TDs	0	0–0	0	0
#29 Jarvis McCall Jr.	4	2	1	3	0–0 yards	0–0 yards	0	0	0–0 yards	0.0	0 TDs	0	0–0	0	0
#31 Tristan Cooper	6	2	1	3	0–0 yards	0–0 yards	0	0	0–0 yards	0.0	0 TDs	0	0–0	0	0
#32 DeAndre’ Miller	2	6	1	7	0–0 yards	0–0 yards	1	0	0–0 yards	0.0	0 TDs	0	0–0	0	0
#33 Nathan Tilford	5	2	1	3	0–0 yards	0–0 yards	0	0	0–0 yards	0.0	0 TDs	0	0–0	0	0
#34 Jacob Colacion	6	2	0	2	0–0 yards	0–0 yards	1	0	0–0 yards	0.0	0 TDs	0	0–0	0	0
#40 Thomas Reid III	2	1	0	1	0–0 yards	0–0 yards	0	0	0–0 yards	0.0	0 TDs	0	0–0	0	0
#44 Kurtis Brown*	6	5	2	7	2.0–4 yards	1.0–2 yards	0	0	0–0 yards	0.0	0 TDs	0	0–0	0	0
#49 Jalen Harris*	4	3	1	4	0–0 yards	0–0 yards	0	0	0–0 yards	0.0	0 TDs	0	0–0	0	0
#51 Lee Anderson III	6	1	0	1	0–0 yards	0–0 yards	0	0	0–0 yards	0.0	0 TDs	0	0–0	0	0
#56 Nick Reinhardt	1	1	0	1	0–0 yards	0–0 yards	0	0	0–0 yards	0.0	0 TDs	0	0–0	0	0
#60 Luca Bruno	5	7	4	11	0–0 yards	0–0 yards	1	0	0–0 yards	0.0	0 TDs	0	0–0	0	0
#86 Justin Belknap	6	9	0	9	2.0–13 yards	2.0–13 yards	0	0	0–0 yards	0.0	0 TDs	0	1–9 yards	0	0
#91 Finton Connolly	6	4	4	8	2.5–11 yards	0.5–5 yards	0	1	0–0 yards	0.0	0 TDs	0	1–0	0	0
#93 Parker Zellers	4	7	3	10	0–0 yards	0–0 yards	0	0	0–0 yards	0.0	0 TDs	0	0–0	0	0
#96 Marcus Griffin	3	0	0	0	0–0 yards	0–0 yards	1	0	0–0 yards	0.0	0 TDs	0	0–0	0	0
#98 Larry Tharpe Jr.	6	6	2	8	1.5–5 yards	0.5–4 yards	0	0	0–0 yards	0.0	0 TDs	0	0–0	0	0
#99 Dereck Boles*	6	13	8	21	0.5–1 yards	0–0 yards	0	0	0–0 yards	0.0	0 TDs	0	0–0	0	0
Total	6	280	94	374	34–154 yards	15–114 yards	20	3	8–129 yards	0.0	1 TDs	0	5–9 yards	5	0

=== Special teams ===
Kicking statistics
#	NAME	XPM	XPA	XP%	FGM	FGA	FG%	1–19	20–29	30–39	40–49	50+	LNG	BLK	PTS
9	Josh Pollack	45	47	96.2%	10	14	71%	0/0	4/5	4/5	2/4	0/0	45	2	73
43	Lucas Havrisik	2	2	100%	1	2	50%	0/0	0/0	0/0	0/1	1/1	57	1	5
	TOTALS	47	49	96%	11	16	70%	0/0	4/5	4/5	2/5	0/0	102	3	78

Kickoff statistics
#	NAME	KICKS	YDS	AVG	TB	OB
43	Lucas Havrisik	61	3,889	63.8	44	2
9	Josh Pollack	2	68	34.0	0	0
	TOTALS	63	3,957	62.8	44	2

Punting statistics
#	NAME	PUNTS	YDS	AVG	LONG	TB	FC	I–20	50+	BLK
16	Jake Glatting	19	693	36.5	52	1	4	4	1	0
9	Josh Pollack	5	197	39.4	54	0	2	3	1	0
13	Brandon Dawkins	1	36	36.0	36	0	0	1	0	0
	TOTALS	25	926	37.0	54	1	6	8	2	0

Kick return statistics
#	NAME	RTNS	YDS	AVG	TD	LNG
2	Tyrell Johnson	12	338	28.2	0	58
18	Cedric Peterson	1	24	24.0	0	24
89	Donovan Moore	1	12	12.0	0	12
	TOTALS	14	374	26.7	0	58

Punt return statistics
#	NAME	RTNS	YDS	AVG	TD	LONG
6	Shun Brown	8	149	18.6	2	66
9	Tony Ellison	1	5	5.0	0	5
	TOTALS	9	154	17.1	2	66

== Awards and honors ==
=== Preseason award watch lists ===
- Nathan Eldridge

Rimington Trophy

- Jacob Alsadek

Wuerffel Trophy

- Brandon Dawkins

Johnny Unitas Golden Arm Award

- Dane Cruikshank

Senior Bowl

=== Weekly awards ===
- Khalil Tate (QB)

Walter Camp Offensive Player of the Week, at Colorado (10/07/17)
Davey O’Brien Great 8, at Colorado (10/07/17)
Davey O’Brien Great 8 (2), vs UCLA (10/14/17)
Davey O’Brien Great 8 (3), vs Washington State (10/28/17)
CFPA National Performer of the Week, at Colorado (10/07/17)
Rose Bowl: Pac-12 Offensive Player of the Week, at Colorado (10/07/17)
Rose Bowl: Pac-12 Offensive Player of the Week (2), vs Washington State (10/28/17)
Las Vegas Bowl: Pac-12 Offensive Player of the Week, at Colorado (10/07/17)
Las Vegas Bowl: Pac-12 Offensive Player of the Week (2), at California (10/21/17)
Las Vegas Bowl: Pac-12 Offensive Player of the Week (3), vs Washington State (10/28/17)
Athlon Sports: Pac-12 Offensive Player of the Week, at Colorado (10/07/17)
Athlon Sports: Pac-12 Offensive Player of the Week (2), at California (10/21/17)
Athlon Sports: Pac-12 Offensive Player of the Week (3), vs Washington (10/28/17)
Pac-12 Offensive Player of the Week, at Colorado (10/07/17)
Pac-12 Offensive Player of the Week (2), vs UCLA (10/14/17)
Pac-12 Offensive Player of the Week (3), at California (10/21/17)
Pac-12 Offensive Player of the Week (4), vs Washington State (10/28/17)
Helmet Award Player of the Week, at Colorado (10/07/17)
Helmet Award Player of the Week (2), vs UCLA (10/14/17)
Helmet Award Player of the Week (3), at California (10/21/17)
Helmet Award Player of the Week (4), vs Oregon State (11/11/17)

- Brandon Dawkins (QB)

Helmet Award Player of the Week, vs. NAU (09/02/17)
Helmet Award Player of the Week (2), at UTEP (09/15/17)

- Nick Wilson (RB)

Helmet Award Player of the Week, vs. NAU (09/02/17)
Helmet Award Player of the Week (2), vs UCLA (10/14/17)

- J. J. Taylor (RB)

Helmet Award Player of the Week, vs. NAU (09/02/17)
Helmet Award Player of the Week (2), vs. Houston (09/09/17)
Helmet Award Player of the Week (3), vs. Oregon State (11/11/17)

- Zach Green (RB)

Helmet Award Player of the Week, at California (10/21/17)

- TJ Johnson (WR)

Helmet Award Player of the Week, vs. NAU (09/02/17)

- Shawn Poindexter (WR)

Helmet Award Player of the Week, at Colorado (10/07/17)

- Shun Brown (WR)

Helmet Award Player of the Week, vs. NAU (09/02/17)
Helmet Award Player of the Week (2), at UTEP (09/15/17)

- Nathan Eldridge (OL)

Helmet Award Player of the Week, at Colorado (10/07/17)
Helmet Award Player of the Week (2), vs UCLA (10/14/17)

- Christian Boettcher (OL)

Helmet Award Player of the Week, at California (10/21/17)

- Gerhard de Beer (OL)

Student Player of the Week, vs Utah (09/22/17)

- Jacob Alsadek (OL)

Student Player of the Week, at UTEP (09/15/17)

- Bryce Wolma (TE)

Helmet Award Player of the Week, at UTEP (09/15/17)
Student Player of the Week, vs Washington (10/28/17)

- Kwesi Mashack (CB)

Helmet Award Player of the Week, vs. Houston (09/09/17)

- Jace Whittaker (CB)

Student Player of the Week, at Colorado (10/07/17)
Helmet Award Player of the Week, vs UCLA (10/14/17)

- Antonio Parks (CB)

Student Player of the Week, vs NAU (09/02/17)

- Finton Connolly (DL)

Student Player of the Week, at California (10/07/17)

- Dereck Boles (DL)

Helmet Award Player of the Week, vs. Oregon State (11/11/17)

- Luca Bruno (DL)

Helmet Award Player of the Week, vs. Oregon State (11/11/17)

- Tony Fields II (LB)

Helmet Award Player of the Week, vs. Houston (09/09/17)

- Colin Schooler (LB)

Helmet Award Player of the Week, vs. Houston (09/09/17)
Helmet Award Player of the Week (2), at UTEP (09/15/17)
Helmet Award Player of the Week (3), at California (10/21/17)
Helmet Award Player of the Week (4), vs. Oregon State (11/11/17)
Athlon Sports: Pac-12 Defensive Freshman Player of the Week, at California (10/21/17)
Pac-12 Defensive Player of the Week, at California (10/21/17)

- Kylan Wilborn (LB)

Helmet Award Player of the Week, at UTEP (09/15/17)
Helmet Award Player of the Week (2), vs UCLA (10/14/17)

- Chacho Ulloa (S)

Student Player of the Week, vs UCLA (10/14/17)

- Jarrius Wallace (S)

Helmet Award Player of the Week, at California (10/21/17)

- Lucas Havarisik (PK)

Helmet Award Player of the Week, vs. NAU (09/02/17)
Pac-12 Special Teams Player of the Week, vs Washington State (10/28/17)

- Josh Pollack (PK)

Helmet Award Player of the Week, vs. Houston (09/09/17)

- Jake Glatting (P)

Student Player of the Week, vs Houston (09/09/17)

=== Yearly awards ===
- Khalil Tate

*Maxwell Award semifinalist
*Davey O’Brien Award semifinalist
*Walter Camp Player of the Year Award semifinalist
*Manning Award finalist
*AP Pac-12 Newcomer Player of the Year (2017)

- J. J. Taylor

Pac-12 Offensive Freshman Player of the Year

- Colin Schooler

Pac-12 Defensive Freshman Player of the Year

=== All-Americans ===
Each year several publications release lists of their ideal "team". The athletes on these lists are referred to as All-Americans. The NCAA recognizes five All-American lists. They are the Associated Press (AP), American Football Coaches Association (AFCA), Football Writers Association of America (FWAA), Sporting News (SN), and the Walter Camp Football Foundation (WCFF). If a player is selected to the first team of three publications he is considered a consensus All-American, if a player is selected to the first team of all five publications he is considered a unanimous All-American.

- Khalil Tate

College Football News Pac-12 Top 30 (2017)

- Nathan Eldridge

All-Pac-12 AP 2nd team (2017)

- Kylan Wilborn

All-Pac-12 AP 2nd team (2017)
USA Today Freshman All American (2017)

- Colin Schooler

USA Today Freshman All American (2017)
ESPN Freshman All American (2017)
247sports Freshman All American (2017)

- Jace Whittaker

All-Pac-12 AP 2nd team (2017)

- Tony Fields II

ESPN Freshman All American (2017)
247sports Freshman All American (2017)

- Lorenzo Burns

College Football News All-Pac-12 (2017)
College Football News Pac-12 Top 30 (2017)

Key:
First team
Consensus All-American
Unanimous All-American

=== All-Pac-12 teams ===
- Jacob Alsadek

All-Pac-12 honorable mention (2017)

- Shun Brown

All-Pac-12 honorable mention (2017)

- Nate Eldridge

All-Pac-12 honorable mention (2017)

- Colin Schooler

All-Pac-12 honorable mention (2017)

- Khalil Tate

All-Pac-12 honorable mention (2017)

- Nick Wilson

All-Pac-12 honorable mention (2017)

=== All-Academic Teams ===
==== All-Pac-12 Academic ====
- Khalil Tate (QB)

All-Pac-12 Academic Honorable Mention (2017)

- Branden Leon (RB)

All-Pac-12 Academic Honorable Mention (2017)

- Jamie Nunley (TE)

All-Pac-12 Academic Honorable Mention (2017)

- Christian Boettcher (OL)

All-Pac-12 Academic First Team (2017)

- Malcolm Holland (CB)

All-Pac-12 Academic First Team (2017)

- Jake Glatting (P)

All-Pac-12 Academic Second Team (2017)

- Josh Pollack (PK)

All-Pac-12 Academic Honorable Mention (2017)

=== Record broken ===
Honors and Awards Source: 2017 Arizona Media Notes (unless otherwise noted)

== Players in the 2018 NFL draft ==
Player	Position	Round	Pick	NFL club
Dane Cruikshank	CB	5	152	Tennessee Titans

== Media affiliates ==
=== Radio ===
- ESPN Radio – (ESPN Tucson 1490 AM & 104.09 FM) – Nationwide (Dish Network, Sirius XM, TuneIn radio and iHeartRadio)
- KCUB 1290 AM – Football Radio Show – (Tucson, AZ)
- KHYT – 107.5 FM (Tucson, AZ)
- KTKT 990 AM – La Hora de Los Gatos (Spanish) – (Tucson, AZ)
- KGME 910 AM – (IMG Sports Network) – (Phoenix, AZ)
- KTAN 1420 AM – (Sierra Vista, AZ)
- KDAP 96.5 FM (Douglas, Arizona)
- KWRQ 102.3 FM – (Safford, AZ/Thatcher, AZ)
- KIKO 1340 AM – (Globe, AZ)
- KVWM 970 AM – (Show Low, AZ/Pinetop-Lakeside, AZ)
- XENY 760 – (Nogales, Sonora) (Spanish)

=== TV ===
- KOLD (CBS)
- KGUN (ESPN College Football on ABC/ABC)
- FOX/FS1 (Fox Sports Media Group)
- ESPN/ESPN2/ESPNU (ESPN Family)
- CBS Sports Network
- Pac-12 Network (Pac-12 Arizona)
