= Colin Schooler =

American football player (born 1999)

No. 36 – Firenze Guelfi
- Position: Linebacker
- Roster status: Active

Personal information
- Born: March 5, 1999 (age 27); Dana Point, California, U.S.
- Listed height: 6 ft 1 in (1.85 m)
- Listed weight: 230 lb (104 kg)

Career information
- High school: Mission Viejo
- College: Arizona (2017–2019); Texas Tech (2020–2021)
- NFL draft: 2022: undrafted

Career history
- Arlington Renegades (2023–2024); Firenze Guelfi (2025–present)

Awards and highlights
- XFL champion (2023); Second-team All-Big 12 (2021); Pac-12 Freshman Defensive Player of the Year (2017)

Colin Schooler (born March 5, 1999) is an American professional football linebacker for the Firenze Guelfi of the Italian Football League (IFL). He went to Texas Tech University, where he played for the Texas Tech Red Raiders football team after his tenure as an anchor on defense at the University of Arizona.

== Early life ==
Schooler played the first year of high school football at Dana Hills High School and the second at Tesoro High School and Trabuco Hills High School before playing his final two years at Mission Viejo High School which is located in Mission Viejo, California. He was a two-way player, playing as a running back and wide receiver on offense and linebacker on defense. He also played basketball and track and field. As a senior on defense, he recorded 77 tackles and 10.0 sacks and rushed for 1,161 yards and gathered 464 receiving yards with 25 total touchdowns.

Schooler made All-County First Team Defense and was named Defensive Player of the Year for Orange County after the 2016 season. He finished his senior year with 77 tackles, 4.0 TFL, 2.0 sacks, 2 INT, 2 PBU, and a forced fumble. In his two varsity seasons at Mission Viejo, he compiled 198 tackles, 13.0 TFL, 9.5 sacks, 3 INT, 9 PBU, 6 forced fumbles, and 4 fumble recoveries.

He was a three-star recruit by 247sports. Schooler received offers from multiple top football programs including Arizona, Fresno State, UNLV, Nevada, and New Mexico. He committed to Arizona in 2016.

== College career ==
=== Arizona ===
==== 2017 ====
Schooler finished 11th in the Pac-12, and second among freshmen with 88 tackles (7.3 per game), trailing only freshman teammate Tony Fields II (91 tackles/7.6 per game). Schooler added 13.5 tackles for loss, most among all FBS freshmen, 3.0 sacks and two interceptions (returned one 66 yards for a touchdown vs. Washington State). In nine Pac-12 games, he posted 81 tackles (9.0 per game) and all 13.5 tackles for loss. Schooler was named Pac-12 Defensive Freshman of the Year.

=== Texas Tech ===
==== 2020 ====
Schooler announced on August 19 that he would be entering the transfer portal since the Pac 12 would not be playing football in the fall.

On October 24 against West Virginia, Schooler and fellow linebacker Jacob Morgenstern forced a fumble that defensive back Zech McPhearson returned 56 yards for a touchdown in the 34–27 victory. On November 14 against Baylor, Schooler made a touchdown saving tackle on quarterback Charlie Brewer in the 4th quarter; Baylor would have to settle on a field goal to end the drive. The goal line tackle on Brewer would prove to be a pivotal play as Texas Tech won 24–23. Schooler finished the game with 11 total tackles, one tackle for a loss, and a sack; for his efforts, Schooler was named the Big 12 Newcomer of the Week.

==== 2021 ====
On October 2, against West Virginia, Schooler finished the game with 15 tackles, one tackle short of his single-game record, and forced a fumble that was recovered by Devin Drew for Texas Tech. For his performance, Schooler was named the Big 12 Defensive Player of the Week.

=== Statistics ===
Year	Team	Games	Tackles					Interceptions					Fumbles	
Year	Team	GP	Solo	Ast	Total	TFL	Sack	Int	Yds	Avg	TD	PD	FR	FF
2017	Arizona	13	68	28	96	13.5	4.0	2	119	59.5	1	1	0	2
2018	Arizona	12	72	47	119	21.5	3.5	2	83	41.5	0	4	1	1
2019	Arizona	12	64	34	98	11.0	1.5	0	0	0.0	0	2	2	0
2020	Texas Tech	9	41	22	63	5.0	3.5	0	0	0.0	0	1	0	2
2021	Texas Tech	13	71	35	106	7.5	2.0	1	11	11.0	0	5	1	3
Career		59	316	166	482	58.5	14.5	5	213	42.6	1	13	4	8

== Professional career ==
Pre-draft measurables
Height	Weight	Arm length	Hand span	40-yard dash	10-yard split	20-yard split	20-yard shuttle	Three-cone drill	Vertical jump	Broad jump	Bench press
5 ft 11 3/4 in (1.82 m)	229 lb (104 kg)	32 3/4 in (0.83 m)	9 7/8 in (0.25 m)	4.67 s	1.71 s	2.63 s	4.28 s	6.96 s	37.5 in (0.95 m)	10 ft 5 in (3.18 m)	22 reps
All values from Pro Day

The Arlington Renegades selected Schooler in the 11th round of the 2023 XFL Supplemental Draft on January 1, 2023. He re-signed with the team on January 22, 2024.

On August 26, 2024 the Firenze Guelfi announced they signed Schooler for the 2025 season.

== Personal life ==
Schooler is the son of Tom and Christine Schooler. He has one brother, Brenden, and one sister. Schooler's father, Tom, played football at Eastern Michigan. Schooler's mother, Christine, played volleyball at Cal State LA. His brother, Brenden, former Oregon receiver, transferred to Texas prior to the 2020 season as a graduate transfer. He is majoring in literacy, learning & leadership.
