= Timmy Allen =

American basketball player (born 2000)

- Allen with Manresa in 2026

No. 0 – Bàsquet Manresa
- Position: Small forward / shooting guard
- League: Liga ACB; EuroCup

Personal information
- Born: January 9, 2000 (age 26) Mesa, Arizona, U.S.
- Listed height: 6 ft 6 in (1.98 m)
- Listed weight: 210 lb (95 kg)

Career information
- High school: Desert Ridge (Mesa, Arizona); Red Mountain (Mesa, Arizona)
- College: Utah (2018–2021); Texas (2021–2023)
- NBA draft: 2023: undrafted
- Playing career: 2023–present

Career history
- 2023–2024: Memphis Hustle
- 2024: Memphis Grizzlies
- 2024–2025: Filou Oostende
- 2025: Trapani Shark
- 2025–2026: PAOK Thessaloniki
- 2026–present: Manresa

Career highlights
- BNXT Belgian Finals MVP (2025); Belgian League champion (2025); BNXT League MVP (2025); BNXT League First Team (2025); Belgian Cup winner (2025); Second-team All-Big 12 (2022); Big 12 All-Newcomer Team (2022); First-team All-Pac-12 (2021); Second-team All-Pac-12 (2020); Pac-12 All-Freshman Team (2019)
- Stats at NBA.com
- Stats at Basketball Reference

Timmy Allen (born January 9, 2000) is an American professional basketball player for Manresa of the Liga ACB and the EuroCup. He played college basketball for the Utah Utes and Texas Longhorns.

== High school career ==
Allen grew up playing baseball, football and basketball. He played his first two years of varsity basketball for Desert Ridge High School in Mesa, Arizona. As a sophomore, he averaged 21.3 points and 9.4 rebounds per game. For his junior season, Allen transferred to Red Mountain High School in Mesa, because the school was closer to where his mother was receiving cancer treatment. He sat out his first nine games due to Arizona Interscholastic Association transfer rules. As a senior, Allen averaged 29.8 points, 11.3 rebounds and 3.1 assists per game. He played Amateur Athletic Union basketball for the Compton Magic.

=== Recruiting ===
Allen was a consensus four-star recruit, with 247Sports considering him the top player from Arizona in the 2018 class. On September 19, 2017, he committed to play college basketball for Utah over offers from Iowa State, Texas Tech, San Diego State and UCLA, among others.

College recruiting
Name	Hometown	School	Height	Weight	Commit date
Timmy Allen; SF	Mesa, AZ	Red Mountain (AZ)	6 ft 6 in (1.98 m)	200 lb (91 kg)	Sep 19, 2017
Timmy Allen; SF	Recruit ratings: Rivals: 247Sports: ESPN: (80)				
Overall recruit ranking: Rivals: 96 247Sports: 101 ESPN: —
Note: In many cases, Scout, Rivals, 247Sports, On3, and ESPN may conflict in their listings of height and weight.; In these cases, the average was taken. ESPN grades are on a 100-point scale.; Sources: "Utah 2018 Basketball Commitments". Rivals.; "2018 Utah Utes Recruiting Class". ESPN.; "2018 Team Ranking". Rivals.

== College career ==
In late January 2019, during his freshman season, Allen registered two double-doubles in a span of six days, leading Utah to wins over Colorado and California. On February 2, he scored a season-high 24 points in an 81–72 loss to Oregon State. As a freshman, Allen averaged 12.2 points, 5.1 rebounds and 2.5 assists per game, earning Pac-12 All-Freshman Team honors. By the time he was a sophomore, he lost 25 lbs (11 kg) and was placed in a leading role, with many key players graduating or transferring. On December 4, 2019, Allen scored a career-high 27 points along with five rebounds and five assists in a 102–95 overtime victory over BYU. On December 18, he scored 25 points to lead Utah to a 69–66 upset win over sixth-ranked Kentucky. Allen averaged 17.3 points, 7.3 rebounds, three assists and 1.2 steals per game as a sophomore and was named to the Second Team All-Pac-12. He was the only Power Five player that season to average at least 17 points, seven rebounds, 2.5 assists and one steal per game. Following the season, he declared for the 2020 NBA draft, before returning to college. As a junior, Allen averaged 17.2 points, 6.4 rebounds and 3.9 assists per game, earning First Team All-Pac-12 honors.

After a coaching change at Utah, Allen transferred to Texas. He was named to the Second-team All-Big 12 as well as the All-Newcomer Team. Allen averaged 12.1 points, 6.4 rebounds, and 1.2 steals per game. On February 11, 2023, Allen scored his 2,000th point in a win against West Virginia.

== Professional career ==
=== Memphis Hustle / Grizzlies (2023–2024) ===
After going undrafted in the 2023 NBA draft, Allen joined the Memphis Grizzlies for the 2023 NBA Summer League and on October 16, 2023, he signed with them. However, he was waived two days later and on October 30, he joined the Memphis Hustle where he appeared in 46 matches, while averaging 9.5 points, 4.1 rebounds, 2.7 assists and 1.0 steals in 26.4 minutes.

On April 6, 2024, Allen signed a 10-day contract with the Memphis Grizzlies.

=== Filou Oostende (2024–2025) ===
On August 8, 2024, Allen signed with Filou Oostende of the BNXT League. In his first season, Allen averaged 20.2 points, 4.2 rebounds, and 1.9 assists in 27.9 minutes per game. At the end of the regular season, Allen won the BNXT MVP award. Allen and his team won the Belgium finals during the playoffs, where Allen was named the BNXT League Finals MVP.

=== Trapani Shark (2025) ===
On June 29, 2025, Allen signed with Trapani Shark of the Italian Lega Basket Serie A (LBA). He played four games with the team during the 2025-26 Basketball Champions League, averaging 15.3 points, 3.5 rebounds, and 1.8 assists per game.

=== PAOK Thessaloniki (2025–2026) ===
On December 11, 2025, Allen moved to Greek club PAOK. In the 2025-26 season, he played in 16 games, averaging 8.7 points, 3.1 rebounds, and 1.5 assists per game.

=== Manresa (2026–present) ===
On August 1, 2026, he signed with Manresa of the Liga ACB and the EuroCup on a one-year contract.

== Career statistics ==
Legend
GP	Games played	GS	Games started	MPG	Minutes per game
FG%	Field goal percentage	3P%	3-point field goal percentage	FT%	Free throw percentage
RPG	Rebounds per game	APG	Assists per game	SPG	Steals per game
BPG	Blocks per game	PPG	Points per game	**Bold**	Career high

=== Professional ===
Year	Team	GP	GS	MPG	FG%	3P%	FT%	RPG	APG	SPG	BPG	PPG
2023-24	Memphis Hustle	30	-	27.7	.417	.338	.795	3.4	2.4	1.8	1.1	9.9
2024-25	BC Oostende	45	34	28.2	.484	.378	.695	4.3	2.2	1.3	0.2	20.4
2025-26	Trapani Shark	4	2	26.5	.436	.400	.412	3.5	1.8	1.0	0.0	15.3
2025-26	PAOK	16	3	23.0	.402	.179	.750	3.1	1.5	0.8	0.2	8.7

=== NBA ===
Year	Team	GP	GS	MPG	FG%	3P%	FT%	RPG	APG	SPG	BPG	PPG
2023–24	Memphis	5	0	25.0	.261	.000	.500	3.4	1.0	0.8	0.0	2.6
Career		5	0	25.0	.261	.000	.500	3.4	1.0	0.8	0.0	2.6

=== College ===
Year	Team	GP	GS	MPG	FG%	3P%	FT%	RPG	APG	SPG	BPG	PPG
2018–19	Utah	29	26	28.8	**.575**	**.571**	.735	5.1	2.4	0.9	0.2	12.2
2019–20	Utah	31	31	**35.6**	.441	.211	.722	**7.3**	3.0	1.2	0.2	**17.3**
2020–21	Utah	25	25	35.1	.465	.268	**.769**	6.4	**3.9**	**1.3**	0.2	17.2
2021–22	Texas	34	34	29.0	.493	.267	.731	6.4	2.1	1.2	0.4	12.1
2022–23	Texas	**35**	**35**	28.4	.486	.150	.688	5.6	3.5	0.9	**0.5**	10.5
Career		154	151	31.1	.483	.248	.729	6.1	2.9	1.1	0.3	13.6

== Personal life ==
Allen's mother, Elise, died from breast cancer during his junior season in high school, about seven years after being first diagnosed with the disease. His older brother, Teddy, played college basketball for West Virginia, Nebraska and New Mexico State.
