= Donavan Tate =

American football and baseball player

Personal information
- Born: September 27, 1990 (age 36) Cartersville, Georgia, U.S.
- Height: 6 ft 2 in (188 cm)
- Weight: 205 lb (93 kg; 14 st 9 lb)
- Football career

Profile
- Position: Quarterback

Career information
- College: University of Arizona (2017)

Sport
- Baseball career
- Outfielder
- Bats: Right Throws: Right
- Stats at Baseball Reference

Donavan Reed Tate (born September 27, 1990) is an American former college football quarterback for the University of Arizona Wildcats. Previously, he was a Minor League Baseball outfielder who was selected third overall by the San Diego Padres in the 2009 Major League Baseball draft.

== Career ==
=== High school career ===
Tate attended Cartersville High School in Cartersville, Georgia. He played baseball and American football for Cartersville, and was named a High School All-American in both sports. In his senior year, he broke a rib playing football. Tate committed to play baseball and college football for the North Carolina Tar Heels.

=== Baseball career ===
The San Diego Padres selected Tate in the first round, with the third overall selection, in the 2009 Major League Baseball draft. Tate chose to sign with the Padres for a $6.7 million signing bonus rather than attend North Carolina. His professional baseball career was limited by injuries. In his first two seasons, he had surgery for a sports hernia, broke his jaw, and sprained a shoulder. He also underwent treatment for substance abuse. The Padres released Tate after the 2015 season, and he signed with the Los Angeles Dodgers for the 2016 season. He played six seasons in Minor League Baseball, but never played above Class A-Advanced, last playing for the Rancho Cucamonga Quakes before being released by the Dodgers in 2016.

=== College football career ===
In 2017, after his release from the minor leagues, Tate returned to college and joined the Arizona Wildcats football team as a quarterback. On December 24, 2017, Tate left Arizona to be closer to his family in Georgia.

== Personal life ==
Tate is the son of former NFL tailback Lars Tate. He is married and has four children.
