= Jacob Alsadek =

American football player and coach (born 1994)

Albany Great Danes
- Title: Offensive line coach

Personal information
- Born: September 12, 1994 (age 32); San Diego, California, U.S.
- Listed height: 6 ft 7 in (2.01 m)
- Listed weight: 312 lb (142 kg)

Career information
- High school: Torrey Pines (San Diego, California)
- College: Arizona
- NFL draft: 2018: undrafted

Career history

Playing
- Green Bay Packers (2018)*; Dallas Cowboys (2018)*; Arizona Hotshots (2019)*
- * Offseason or practice squad member only

Coaching
- Albany (2019) Graduate assistant; Toledo (2020–2021) Graduate assistant; Oregon State (2022) Graduate assistant; Albany (2023–present) Offensive line coach

Jacob Alsadek (born September 12, 1994) is an American college football coach and former guard. He is the offensive line coach for the University at Albany, SUNY. He played college football at Arizona, and was signed by the Green Bay Packers as an undrafted free agent in 2018.

== College career ==
Alsadek attended the University of Arizona, where he played on the Arizona Wildcats football team from 2013 to 2017 starting for four years at right guard.

During Alsadek's redshirt Freshmen year in 2014 he was awarded Freshmen All-American honors by USA Today. A member of the offensive line that blocked for the Wildcats to average 463.6 yards of offense per game and 34.5 points per game … Running back Nick Wilson (1,375 yards) and quarterback Anu Solomon (3,793 yards) set school freshman records in their respective categories.

In 2016 Alsadek and the Wildcats Offensive Line was the conference’s top rushing offense (235.0 yards per game). He started at right guard in the Territorial Cup (Nov. 25) when UA produced three 100-yard rushers for the second time in school history and set a new program record with 511 yards on the ground. He was named team’s Hard Edge Player of the Week for his effort in Utah game (Oct. 8). In 2015 Alsadek and the Wildcats Offensive Line paved the way for 494.9 yards per game, including 222.3 yards on the ground.

In 2017 according to, Pro Football Focus, Alsadek received first-team All-Pac-12 honors and an 86.4 grade, making him the fourth-best lineman and best right guard in the Pac-12. He earned All-Pac-12 honorable mention as a senior in 2017 by the Pac-12 Committee. In 2017 Athlon Sports also named Alsadek to their First-team All-Pac-12. Alsadek in 2017 led and anchored an Offensive Line that led the Pac-12 and was ranked third nationally in the regular season with 309.3 rushing yards per game. Arizona allowed fewest sacks of any Pac-12 team in regular season. Wildcats rushed for at least 152 yards in all 12 games, including 10 performances with 200-plus yards, seven over 300 yards, four over 400 yards and a school-record 534 yards against Oregon State (Nov. 11). Alsadek was named the team’s Hard Edge Player of the Week in Arizona’s victory at Colorado (Oct. 7).

He played in all but four games throughout his career and started a total of 46 games for the Wildcats. Coming in at one of the most technical positions in a zone blocking system in itself was difficult, but he was also a leader on the field. Voted as one of four team captains his redshirt senior year, Alsadek noted he wasn’t much of a “rah rah” type of guy, but leads by example and the way he carries himself on and off the field.

== Professional career ==
Pre-draft measurables
Height	Weight	40-yard dash	10-yard split	20-yard split	20-yard shuttle	Three-cone drill	Vertical jump	Broad jump	Bench press
6 6 7/8	312 lb (142 kg)	5.38 s	1.83 s	3.12 s	4.94 s	8.17 s	24 in (0.61 m)	8 ft 5 in (2.57 m)	18 reps
All values are from Pro Day

=== East West Shrine Game ===
Alsadek participated in the 2018 East West Shrine Game and was considered to be one of the top performers starting at right guard. "Alsadek understands how to redirect pass rushers. He has good balance and bends well and does a good job of getting to the next level."

=== Green Bay Packers ===
After going undrafted in the 2018 NFL draft, Alsadek signed with the Green Bay Packers on May 4, 2018. He was released on May 30.

=== Dallas Cowboys ===
On August 13, 2018, Alsadek signed as a center to the Dallas Cowboys.

=== Arizona Hotshots (AAF) ===
In 2019, Alsadek signed with the Arizona Hotshots of the Alliance of American Football.

== Coaching career ==
=== Albany ===
Following his release from the Hotshots, Alsadek joined the staff at Albany as a graduate assistant. Alsadek helped coach the offensive line, as the Great Danes went 9-5 and won their first-ever FCS playoff game.

=== Toledo ===
Alsadek spent the 2020 and 2021 seasons as a graduate assistant at Toledo working with the offensive line. He helped the Rockets to an 11-8 record over the two seasons and a trip to the Bahamas Bowl in 2021.

=== Oregon State ===
In January 2022, Alsadek joined the staff at Oregon State as a graduate assistant.

=== Albany (second stint) ===
In January 2023, Alsadek rejoined the staff at Albany as the offensive line coach.
