= Desert Ridge High School =

Coordinates: 33.3701°N 111.6173°W

- Home of the Jaguars

Location
- 10045 E. Madero Ave. Mesa, Arizona, 85209; United States

Information
- Type: Public high school
- Established: 2002
- School district: Gilbert Public Schools
- Principal: Scott Smith
- Teaching staff: 110.80 (FTE)
- Grades: 9–12
- Enrollment: 2,222 (2023-2024)
- Student to teacher ratio: 20.05
- Colors: Red and black
- Mascot: Jaguar
- Website: https://desertridgehigh.gilbertschools.net/
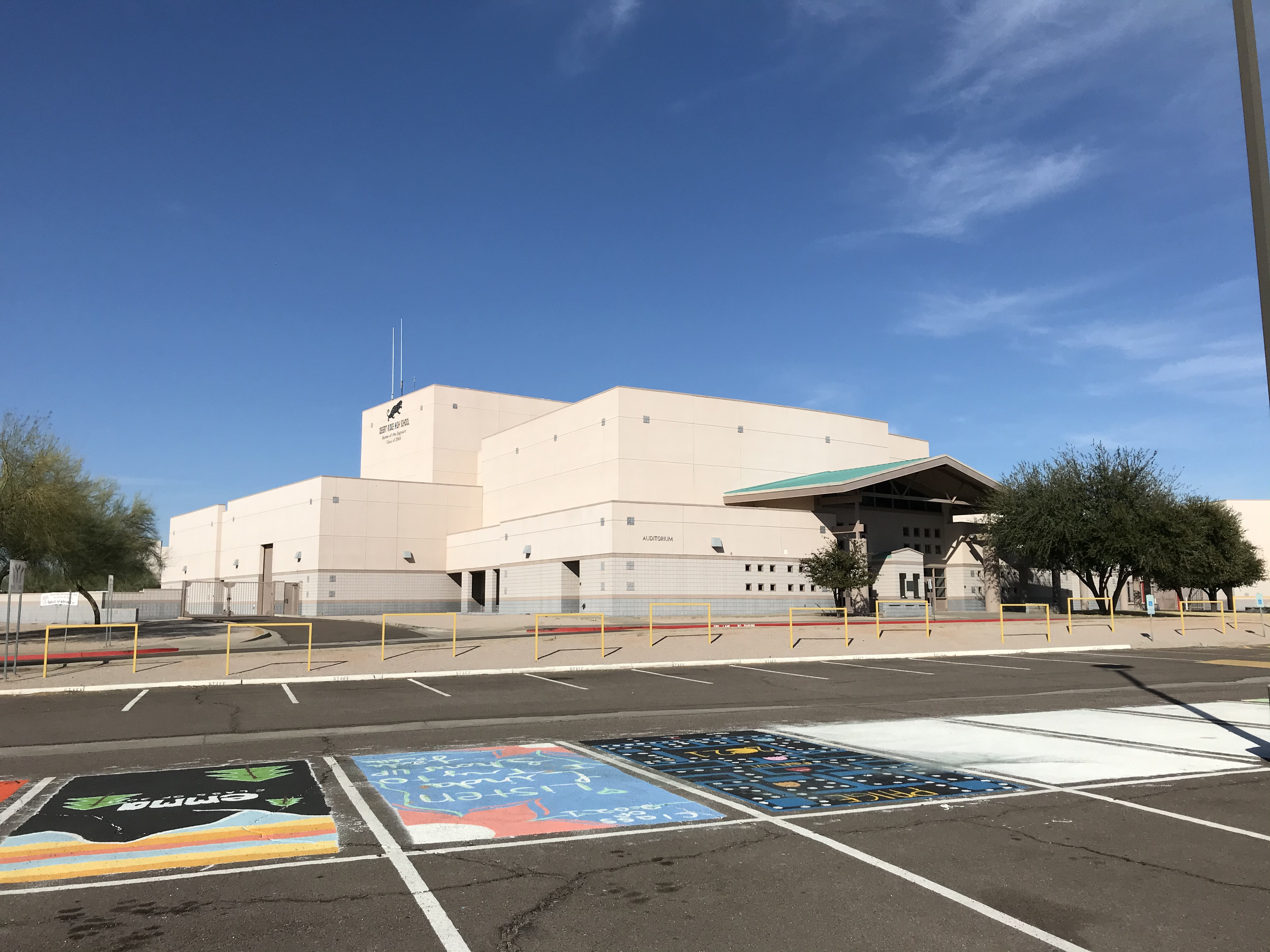
- Desert Ridge High School

Desert Ridge High School (DRHS) was founded in 2002 in Mesa, Arizona, and is part of Gilbert Public Schools.

== History ==
For the 2023-24 school year Desert Ridge High School received an "A" school grade from the Arizona Department of Education.

In 2025, yearbook advisor Jeanette Lockwood was honored with a Rising Star Award from The Journalism Education Association for her dedication to scholastic journalism and media advising at Desert Ridge High and Desert Ridge Junior High.

=== Firearm incident ===
In August 2023, a student was arrested after school officials at Desert Ridge High School received reports that a student had brought a firearm onto campus. The student fled when administrators attempted to locate him and was later found in a nearby neighborhood by a Phoenix Police School Resource Officer. Police said the firearm was recovered from a backpack in nearby bushes. Following an interview conducted in the presence of a parent, the student was charged with misconduct involving weapons and being a minor in possession of a firearm. The student was not publicly identified, and it was unclear whether the firearm was loaded.

== Alumni ==
- Timmy Allen, BNXT Player
- Alex Barrett (born 1994), American football player
- Jake Barrett, baseball player
- DJ Davidson (born 1997), American football player
- Jalen Harris (American football), NFL
