= Jalen Harris (American football) =

American football player (born 1999)

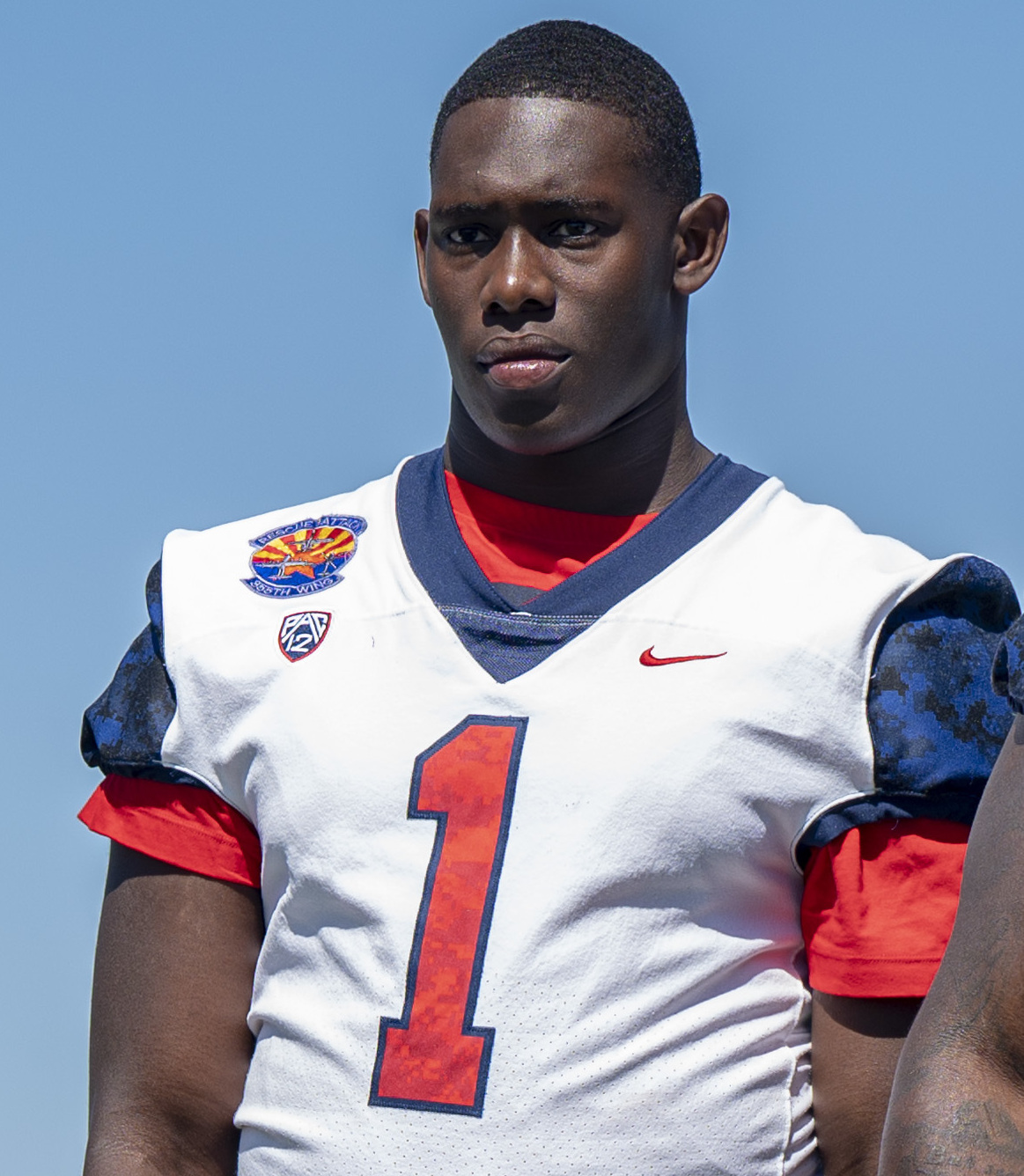
- Harris with the Arizona Wildcats in 2022

Profile
- Position: Defensive end

Personal information
- Born: February 26, 1999 (age 27); Gilbert, Arizona, U.S.
- Listed height: 6 ft 4 in (1.93 m)
- Listed weight: 257 lb (117 kg)

Career information
- High school: Desert Ridge (Mesa, Arizona)
- College: Arizona (2017–2022)
- NFL draft: 2023: undrafted

Career history
- Chicago Bears (2023)*; Washington Commanders (2023); DC Defenders (2025)*; San Antonio Brahmas (2025)*
- * Offseason or practice squad member only

Career NFL statistics as of Week 18, 2023
- Tackles: 6
- Pass deflections: 1
- Stats at Pro Football Reference

Jalen Harris (born February 26, 1999) is an American professional football defensive end. He played college football for the Arizona Wildcats and signed with the Chicago Bears as an undrafted free agent in 2023. Harris has also played for the Washington Commanders.

== Professional career ==
Pre-draft measurables
Height	Weight	Arm length	Hand span	40-yard dash	10-yard split	20-yard split	20-yard shuttle	Three-cone drill	Vertical jump	Broad jump	Bench press
6 ft 4 3/8 in (1.94 m)	257 lb (117 kg)	34 1/8 in (0.87 m)	10 1/4 in (0.26 m)	4.70 s	1.63 s	2.76 s	4.39 s	7.07 s	35.5 in (0.90 m)	9 ft 9 in (2.97 m)	18 reps
All values from Pro Day

=== Chicago Bears ===
After going unselected in the 2023 NFL draft, Harris signed with the Chicago Bears as undrafted free agent on May 4, 2023. On August 29, Harris was waived by the Bears as part of final roster cuts before the start of the 2023 season and signed with their practice squad the next day.

=== Washington Commanders ===
On November 20, 2023, the Washington Commanders signed Harris to their active roster off the Bears' practice squad. He was released on August 27, 2024.

=== DC Defenders ===
On November 13, 2024, Harris signed with the DC Defenders of the United Football League (UFL).

=== San Antonio Brahmas ===
On November 14, 2024, Harris was traded to the San Antonio Brahmas in exchange for CB Bryce Thompson. He was released on March 20, 2025.

== Personal life ==
Harris is the son of retired linebacker, Sean Harris, who played seven seasons in the NFL.
