= 2018 Wyoming Cowboys football team =

American college football season

2018 Wyoming Cowboys football
- Conference: Mountain West Conference
- Mountain Division
- Record: 6–6 (4–4 MW)
- Head coach: Craig Bohl (5th season)
- Offensive coordinator: Brent Vigen (5th season)
- Offensive scheme: Pro-style
- Defensive coordinator: Scottie Hazelton (2nd season)
- Base defense: 4–3
- Home stadium: War Memorial Stadium

2018 Mountain West Conference football standings
	Conf.			Overall
Team	W		L	W		L
Mountain Division
No. 23 Boise State x	7	–	1	10	–	3
No. 22 Utah State	7	–	1	11	–	2
Wyoming	4	–	4	6	–	6
Air Force	3	–	5	5	–	7
Colorado State	2	–	6	3	–	9
New Mexico	1	–	7	3	–	9
West Division
No. 18 Fresno State x$	7	–	1	12	–	2
Nevada	5	–	3	8	–	5
Hawaii	5	–	3	8	–	6
San Diego State	4	–	4	7	–	6
UNLV	2	–	6	4	–	8
San Jose State	1	–	7	1	–	11
Championship: Fresno State 19, Boise State 16 (OT)
$ – Conference champion; x – Division champion/co-champions; y – Championship game participant; Rankings from AP Poll

The 2018 Wyoming Cowboys football team represented the University of Wyoming as a member Mountain West Conference (MW) during the 2018 NCAA Division I FBS football season. Led by fifth-year head coach Craig Bohl, the Cowboys compiled an overall record of 6–6 record with mark 4–4 in conference play, placing third in the MW's Mountain Division. Despite being bowl-eligible, Wyoming was not invited to a bowl game. The team played home games at War Memorial Stadium in Laramie, Wyoming.

== Schedule ==
Date	Time	Opponent	Site	TV	Result	Attendance
August 25	8:00 p.m.	at New Mexico State*	Aggie Memorial Stadium; Las Cruces, NM	ESPN2	W 29–7	20,322
September 1	1:30 p.m.	Washington State*	War Memorial Stadium; Laramie, WY	CBSSN	L 19–41	24,131
September 8	5:00 p.m.	at Missouri*	Faurot Field; Columbia, MO	ESPNU	L 13–40	50,820
September 15	2:00 p.m.	No. 8 (FCS) Wofford*	War Memorial Stadium; Laramie, WY	Stadium	W 17–14	20,293
September 29	5:00 p.m.	Boise State	War Memorial Stadium; Laramie, WY	CBSSN	L 14–34	22,271
October 6	10:00 p.m.	at Hawaii	Aloha Stadium; Halawa, HI (rivalry)	SPEC HI	L 13–17	23,907
October 13	8:30 p.m.	at Fresno State	Bulldog Stadium; Fresno, CA	ESPNU	L 3–27	28,501
October 20	12:30 p.m.	Utah State^{†}	War Memorial Stadium; Laramie, WY (rivalry)	ATTSNRM	L 16–24	18,378
October 26	8:00 p.m.	at Colorado State	Canvas Stadium; Fort Collins, CO (Border War)	CBSSN	W 34–21	32,125
November 3	12:00 p.m.	San Jose State	War Memorial Stadium; Laramie, WY	ATTSNRM	W 24–9	13,238
November 17	2:00 p.m.	Air Force	War Memorial Stadium; Laramie, WY	ESPNews	W 35–27	14,996
November 24	12:30 p.m.	at New Mexico	Dreamstyle Stadium; Albuquerque, NM	ATTSNRM	W 31–3	14,269
*Non-conference game; ^{†}Homecoming; Rankings from AP Poll released prior to the game; All times are in Mountain time

== Preseason ==
=== Award watch lists ===
Award	Player	Position	Year
Chuck Bednarik Award	Carl Granderson	DE	SR
Chuck Bednarik Award	Andrew Wingard	SS	SR
Jim Thorpe Award	Andrew Wingard	SS	SR
Bronko Nagurski Trophy	Youhanna Ghaifan	DT	JR
Bronko Nagurski Trophy	Carl Granderson	DE	SR
Bronko Nagurski Trophy	Andrew Wingard	SS	SR
Outland Trophy	Youhanna Ghaifan	DT	JR
Ted Hendricks Award	Carl Granderson	DE	SR

=== Mountain West media days ===
During the Mountain West media days held July 24–25 at the Cosmopolitan on the Las Vegas Strip, the Cowboys were predicted to finish in second place in the Mountain Division.

==== Preseason All-Mountain West Team ====
The Cowboys had three players selected to the preseason all-Mountain West team. Strong safety Andrew Wingard was selected as the preseason defensive player of the year.

Defense

Youhanna Ghaifan – DT

Carl Granderson – DE

Andrew Wingard – SS

== Game summaries ==
=== At New Mexico State ===
	1	2	3	4	Total
Cowboys	9	6	7	7	29
Aggies	0	0	0	7	7

Scoring summary

Quarter	Time	Drive			Team	Scoring information	Score	
Quarter	Time	Plays	Yards	TOP	Team	Scoring information	WYO	NMSU
1	6:34	9	60	4:37	WYO	Nico Evans 24-yard touchdown run, Cooper Rothe kick good	7	0
1	6:16				WYO	Jason Huntley rush for a loss of 2 yards, safety	9	0
2	11:49	13	49	6:27	WYO	36-yard field goal by Cooper Rothe	12	0
2	10:48	5	44	1:58	WYO	39-yard field goal by Cooper Rothe	15	0
3	7:13	1	56	0:12	WYO	Nico Evans 56-yard touchdown run, Cooper Rothe kick good	22	0
4	10:07	12	71	7:00	WYO	Jevon Bigelow 23-yard touchdown run, Cooper Rothe kick good	29	0
4	1:16	10	93	2:52	NMSU	Drew Dan 31-yard touchdown reception from Matt Romero, Dylan Brown kick good	29	7
"TOP" = time of possession. For other American football terms, see Glossary of American football.							29	7

- Passing leaders: Tyler Vander Waal (WYO): 13–22, 137 YDS; Matt Romero (NMSU): 16–27, 140 YDS, 1 TD
- Rushing leaders: Nico Evans (WYO): 24 CAR, 190 YDS, 2 TD; Jason Huntley (NMSU): 9 CAR, 22 YDS
- Receiving leaders: Austin Fort (WYO): 2 REC, 51 YDS; Drew Dan (NMSU): 2 REC, 60 YDS, 1 TD

=== Washington State ===
	1	2	3	4	Total
Cougars	10	3	7	21	41
Cowboys	2	14	3	0	19

Scoring summary

Quarter	Time	Drive			Team	Scoring information	Score	
Quarter	Time	Plays	Yards	TOP	Team	Scoring information	WSU	WYO
1	9:57	9	68	5:03	WSU	24-yard field goal by Blake Mazza	3	0
1	3:28	10	63	4:14	WSU	James Williams 2-yard touchdown reception from Gardner Minshew, Blake Mazza kick good	10	0
1	1:35				WYO	TEAM rush for a loss of 4 yards, safety	10	2
2	12:23	5	30	2:29	WYO	Nico Evans 8-yard touchdown run, Cooper Rothe kick good	10	9
2	8:37	9	51	3:46	WSU	41-yard field goal by Blake Mazza	13	9
2	5:07	4	54	1:36	WYO	Avante' Cox 23-yard touchdown run, Cooper Rothe kick good	13	16
3	8:48	13	62	6:12	WYO	30-yard field goal by Cooper Rothe	13	19
3	3:51	10	75	4:57	WSU	Max Borghi 6-yard touchdown reception from Gardner Minshew, Blake Mazza kick good	20	19
4	10:55	4	48	1:34	WSU	Easop Winston 7-yard touchdown reception from Gardner Minshew, Blake Mazza kick good	27	19
4	5:50	6	54	2:42	WSU	Max Borghi 14-yard touchdown run, Blake Mazza kick good	34	19
4	0:44	12	62	4:12	WSU	James Williams 3-yard touchdown run, Blake Mazza kick good	41	19
"TOP" = time of possession. For other American football terms, see Glossary of American football.							41	19

- Passing leaders: Tyler Vander Waal (WYO): 8–20, 67 YDS, 1 INT; Gardner Minshew (WSU): 38–57, 319 YDS, 3 TD, 1 INT
- Rushing leaders: Nico Evans (WYO): 18 CAR, 89 YDS, 1 TD; James Williams (WSU): 16 CAR, 82 YDS, 1 TD
- Receiving leaders: James Price (WYO): 2 REC, 23 YDS; Jamire Calvin (WSU): 5 REC, 82 YDS

=== At Missouri ===
	1	2	3	4	Total
Cowboys	0	0	10	3	13
Tigers	3	13	14	10	40

Scoring summary

Quarter	Time	Drive			Team	Scoring information	Score	
Quarter	Time	Plays	Yards	TOP	Team	Scoring information	WYO	MIZ
1	4:08	7	48	2:42	MIZ	50-yard field goal by Tucker McCann	0	3
2	5:32	9	97	3:24	MIZ	Drew Lock 12-yard touchdown run, Tucker McCann kick good	0	10
2	0:32	12	73	1:51	MIZ	Albert Okwuegbunam 19-yard touchdown reception from Drew Lock, 2-point run failed	0	16
3	10:16	13	90	4:39	MIZ	Emanuel Hall 28-yard touchdown reception from Drew Lock, Tucker McCann kick good	0	23
3	7:29	8	41	2:47	WYO	51-yard field goal by Cooper Rothe	3	23
3	4:37	8	75	2:52	MIZ	Kendall Blanton 12-yard touchdown reception from Drew Lock, Tucker McCann kick good	3	30
3	2:51	4	70	1:36	WYO	Jevon Bigelow 7-yard touchdown run, Cooper Rothe kick good	10	30
4	13:05	12	75	4:46	MIZ	Johnathon Johnson 14-yard touchdown reception from Drew Lock, Tucker McCann kick good	10	37
4	7:27	8	29	3:49	MIZ	43-yard field goal by Tucker McCann	10	40
4	5:53	5	51	1:34	WYO	36-yard field goal by Cooper Rothe	13	40
"TOP" = time of possession. For other American football terms, see Glossary of American football.							13	40

- Passing leaders: Tyler Vander Waal (WYO): 13–28, 160 YDS; Drew Lock (MIZ): 33–45, 398 YDS, 4 TD
- Rushing leaders: Jevon Bigelow (WYO): 18 CAR, 56 YDS, 1 TD; Damarea Crockett (MIZ): 19 CAR, 73 YDS
- Receiving leaders: James Price (WYO): 1 REC, 55 YDS; Emanuel Hall (MIZ): 10 REC, 171 YDS, 1 TD

=== Wofford ===
	1	2	3	4	Total
No. 8 (FCS) Terriers	0	7	0	7	14
Cowboys	0	10	0	7	17

Scoring summary

Quarter	Time	Drive			Team	Scoring information	Score	
Quarter	Time	Plays	Yards	TOP	Team	Scoring information	WOF	WYO
2	8:16	4	7	1:20	Wyoming	20-yard field goal by Cooper Rothe	0	3
2	4:32	8	75	3:44	Wofford	Andre Stoddard 4-yard touchdown run, Luke Carter kick good	7	3
2	0:49	11	75	3:43	Wyoming	Tyree Mayfield 6-yard touchdown reception from Tyler Vander Waal, Cooper Rothe kick good	7	10
4	13:06	12	53	5:58	Wofford	Joe Newman 4-yard touchdown run, Luke Carter kick good	14	10
4	0:17	13	80	1:42	Wyoming	Raghib Ismail, Jr. 9-yard touchdown reception from Tyler Vander Waal, Cooper Rothe kick good	14	17
"TOP" = time of possession. For other American football terms, see Glossary of American football.							14	17

- Passing leaders: Tyler Vander Waal (WYO): 25–42, 224 YDS, 2 TD, 1 INT; Joe Newman (WOF): 9–15, 73 YDS, 2 INT
- Rushing leaders: Xazavian Valladay (WYO): 15 CAR, 57 YDS; Lennox McAfee (WOF): 13 CAR, 91 YDS
- Receiving leaders: Austin Conway (WYO): 11 REC, 89 YDS; Blake Morgan (WOF): 6 REC, 48 YDS

=== Boise State ===
	1	2	3	4	Total
Broncos	7	17	3	7	34
Cowboys	0	0	7	7	14

Scoring summary

Quarter	Time	Drive			Team	Scoring information	Score	
Quarter	Time	Plays	Yards	TOP	Team	Scoring information	BSU	WYO
1	9:39	11	75	5:21	Boise State	Alexander Mattison 13-yard touchdown run, Haden Hoggarth kick good	7	0
2	11:02	15	87	6:21	Boise State	A.J. Richardson 21-yard touchdown reception from Brett Rypien, Haden Hoggarth kick good	14	0
2	5:42	5	92	2:05	Boise State	Khalil Shakir 2-yard touchdown run, Haden Hoggarth kick good	21	0
2	0:35	8	30	2:37	Boise State	30-yard field goal by Haden Hoggarth	24	0
3	14:49	1	75	0:11	Wyoming	Nico Evans 75-yard touchdown run, Cooper Rothe kick good	24	7
3	9:23	16	66	5:22	Boise State	33-yard field goal by Haden Hoggarth	27	7
4	6:29	4	51	1:44	Boise State	John Hightower 41-yard touchdown reception from Brett Rypien, Haden Hoggarth kick good	34	7
4	5:47	2	75	0:42	Wyoming	James Price 72-yard touchdown reception from Tyler Vander Waal, Cooper Rothe kick good	34	14
"TOP" = time of possession. For other American football terms, see Glossary of American football.							34	14

- Passing leaders: Tyler Vander Waal (WYO): 15–25, 214 YDS, 1 TD; Brett Rypien (BSU): 28–42, 342 YDS, 2 TD
- Rushing leaders: Nico Evans (WYO): 12 CAR, 141 YDS, 1 TD; Alexander Mattison (BSU): 20 CAR, 57 YDS, 1 TD
- Receiving leaders: James Price (WYO): 2 REC, 77 YDS, 1 TD; A.J. Richardson (BSU): 6 REC, 113 YDS, 1 TD

=== At Hawaii ===
	1	2	3	4	Total
Cowboys	3	0	7	3	13
Rainbow Warriors	0	3	7	7	17

Scoring summary

Quarter	Time	Drive			Team	Scoring information	Score	
Quarter	Time	Plays	Yards	TOP	Team	Scoring information	WYO	HAW
1	8:06	8	43	3:58	Wyoming	40-yard field goal by Cooper Rothe	3	0
2	8:25	8	14	1:57	Hawai'i	39-yard field goal by Ryan Meskell	3	3
3	8:14	10	34	4:58	Wyoming	Interception returned 61 yards for touchdown by Carl Granderson, Cooper Rothe kick good	10	3
3	0:48	5	33	2:48	Hawai'i	Cedric Byrd 5-yard touchdown reception from Chevan Cordeiro, Ryan Meskell kick good	10	10
4	5:31	7	79	3:35	Wyoming	23-yard field goal by Cooper Rothe	13	10
4	1:26	10	68	3:58	Hawai'i	JoJo Ward 38-yard touchdown reception from Chevan Cordeiro, Chevan Cordeiro kick good	13	17
"TOP" = time of possession. For other American football terms, see Glossary of American football.							13	17

- Passing leaders: Tyler Vander Waal (WYO): 9–16, 87 YDS; Chevan Cordeiro (HAW): 19–29, 148 YDS, 2 TD, 1 INT
- Rushing leaders: Nico Evans (WYO): 24 CAR, 192 YDS; Dayton Furuta (HAW): 16 CAR, 101 YDS
- Receiving leaders: James Price (WYO): 3 REC, 28 YDS; Marcus Armstrong-Brown (HAW): 6 REC, 49 YDS

=== At Fresno State ===
	1	2	3	4	Total
Cowboys	3	0	0	0	3
Bulldogs	6	7	14	0	27

Scoring summary

Quarter	Time	Drive			Team	Scoring information	Score	
Quarter	Time	Plays	Yards	TOP	Team	Scoring information	WYO	FRES
1	11:14	8	47	3:46	Wyoming	44-yard field goal by Cooper Rothe	3	0
1	7:05	2	35	0:45	Fresno State	Jared Rice 35-yard touchdown reception from Marcus McMaryion, Asa Fuller kick no good	3	6
2	0:52	12	46	5:48	Fresno State	Marcus McMaryion 1-yard touchdown run, Asa Fuller kick good	3	13
3	9:20	6	47	2:27	Fresno State	David Tangipa 3-yard touchdown reception from Marcus McMaryion, Asa Fuller kick good	3	20
3	3:11	6	85	3:29	Fresno State	Marcus McMaryion 6-yard touchdown run, Asa Fuller kick good	3	27
"TOP" = time of possession. For other American football terms, see Glossary of American football.							3	27

- Passing leaders: Tyler Vander Waal (WYO): 12–32, 117 YDS, 1 INT; Marcus McMaryion (FRES): 22–32, 287 YDS, 2 TD
- Rushing leaders: Nico Evans (WYO): 18 CAR, 58 YDS; Marcus McMaryion (FRES): 7 CAR, 53 YDS, 1 TD
- Receiving leaders: Raghib Ismail Jr. (WYO): 2 REC, 46 YDS; Jared Rice (FRES): 7 REC, 94 YDS, 1 TD

=== Utah State ===
	1	2	3	4	Total
Aggies	7	3	14	0	24
Cowboys	3	0	10	3	16

Scoring summary

Quarter	Time	Drive			Team	Scoring information	Score	
Quarter	Time	Plays	Yards	TOP	Team	Scoring information	USU	WYO
1	14:30	3	65	0:00	Utah State	Darwin Thompson 65-yard touchdown run, Dominik Eberle kick good	7	0
1	0:14	4	3	1:24	Wyoming	27-yard field goal by Cooper Rothe	7	3
2	7:47	12	52	2:55	Utah State	45-yard field goal by Dominik Eberle	10	3
3	14:45	1	3	0:06	Utah State	Darwin Thompson 3-yard touchdown run, Dominik Eberle kick good	17	3
3	4:25	8	37	3:41	Wyoming	47-yard field goal by Cooper Rothe	17	6
3	4:11	0	0	0:00	Utah State	Savon Scarver 99-yard kick return touchdown	24	6
3	2:37	4	75	1:34	Wyoming	Nico Evans 53-yard touchdown run, Cooper Rothe kick good	24	13
4	5:32	10	78	4:56	Wyoming	21-yard field goal by Cooper Rothe	24	16
"TOP" = time of possession. For other American football terms, see Glossary of American football.							24	16

- Passing leaders: Sean Chambers (WYO): 3–5, 62 YDS; Jordan Love (USU): 12–28, 53 YDS, 1 INT
- Rushing leaders: Nico Evans (WYO): 25 CAR, 133 YDS, 1 TD; Darwin Thompson (USU): 17 CAR, 109 YDS, 2 TD
- Receiving leaders: Nico Evans (WYO): 2 REC, 40 YDS; Aaren Vaughns (USU): 2 REC, 14 YDS

=== At Colorado State ===
	1	2	3	4	Total
Cowboys	0	3	21	10	34
Rams	0	0	7	14	21

Scoring summary

Quarter	Time	Drive			Team	Scoring information	Score	
Quarter	Time	Plays	Yards	TOP	Team	Scoring information	WYO	CSU
2	11:27	11	50	4:54	Wyoming	30-yard field goal by Cooper Rothe	3	0
3	11:08	9	75	3:52	Wyoming	Nico Evans 14-yard touchdown reception from Sean Chambers, Cooper Rothe kick good	10	0
3	6:09	3	25	0:53	Wyoming	Sean Chambers 8-yard touchdown run, Cooper Rothe kick good	17	0
3	5:43	1	48	0:11	Wyoming	Nico Evans 48-yard touchdown run, Cooper Rothe kick good	24	0
3	1:23	11	78	4:11	Colorado State	Marvin Kinsey Jr. 15-yard touchdown run, Wyatt Bryan kick good	24	7
4	12:12	9	47	4:11	Wyoming	45-yard field goal by Cooper Rothe	27	7
4	10:31	7	74	1:34	Colorado State	Marvin Kinsey Jr. 10-yard touchdown run, Wyatt Bryan kick good	27	14
4	7:39	5	65	2:52	Wyoming	Tyree Mayfield 43-yard touchdown reception from Sean Chambers, Cooper Rothe kick good	34	14
4	4:10	12	88	3:21	Colorado State	Collin Hill 1-yard touchdown run, Wyatt Bryan kick good	34	21
"TOP" = time of possession. For other American football terms, see Glossary of American football.							34	21

- Passing leaders: Sean Chambers (WYO): 7–10, 116 YDS, 2 TD; Collin Hill (CSU): 34–54, 333 YDS, 2 INT
- Rushing leaders: Nico Evans (WYO): 28 CAR, 176 YDS, 1 TD; Marvin Kinsey Jr. (CSU): 5 CAR, 24 YDS, 2 TD
- Receiving leaders: James Price (WYO): 3 REC, 50 YDS; Preston Williams (CSU): 10 REC, 126 YDS

=== San Jose State ===
	1	2	3	4	Total
Spartans	0	0	3	6	9
Cowboys	3	7	7	7	24

Scoring summary

Quarter	Time	Drive			Team	Scoring information	Score	
Quarter	Time	Plays	Yards	TOP	Team	Scoring information	SJSU	WYO
1	10:36	9	66	4:24	Wyoming	26-yard field goal by Cooper Rothe	0	3
2	14:50	5	71	1:45	Wyoming	Nico Evans 58-yard touchdown run, Cooper Rothe kick good	0	10
3	11:09	9	66	3:51	San Jose State	26-yard field goal by Bryce Crawford	3	10
3	8:41	5	75	2:28	Wyoming	Sean Chambers 64-yard touchdown run, Cooper Rothe kick good	3	17
4	8:48	5	38	1:26	San Jose State	Tre Walker 17-yard touchdown reception from Josh Love, Bryce Crawford kick no good	9	17
4	1:09	14	75	7:39	Wyoming	Austin Fort 20-yard touchdown reception from Sean Chambers, Cooper Rothe kick good	9	24
"TOP" = time of possession. For other American football terms, see Glossary of American football.							9	24

- Passing leaders: Sean Chambers (WYO): 4–8, 51 YDS, 1 TD; Josh Love (SJSU): 19–32, 173 YDS, 1 TD
- Rushing Leaders: Nico Evans (WYO): 33 CAR, 187 YDS, 1 TD; Tyler Nevens (SJSU): 17 CAR, 70 YDS
- Receiving Leaders: Austin Fort (WYO): 2 REC, 28 YDS, 1 TD; Josh Oliver (SJSU): 5 REC, 66 YDS

=== Air Force ===
	1	2	3	4	Total
Falcons	7	10	7	3	27
Cowboys	14	0	0	21	35

Scoring summary

Quarter	Time	Drive			Team	Scoring information	Score	
Quarter	Time	Plays	Yards	TOP	Team	Scoring information	AFA	WYO
1	11:37	8	75	3:23	Wyoming	Raghib Ismail Jr. 11-yard touchdown reception from Tyler Vander Waal, Cooper Rothe kick good	0	7
1	7:38	9	75	3:59	Air Force	Donald Hammond III 1-yard touchdown run, Jake Koehnke kick good	7	7
1	4:44	6	75	2:54	Wyoming	Tyler Vander Waal 3-yard touchdown run, Cooper Rothe kick good	7	14
2	13:41	12	75	6:03	Air Force	Cole Fagan 4-yard touchdown run, Jake Koehnke kick good	14	14
2	1:50	19	81	10:12	Air Force	27-yard field goal by Jake Koehnke	17	14
3	10:19	9	75	4:41	Air Force	Donald Hammond III 36-yard touchdown run, Jake Koehnke kick good	24	14
4	8:44	12	52	6:57	Air Force	21-yard field goal by Jake Koehnke	27	14
4	4:32	13	76	4:06	Wyoming	Tyler Vander Waal 5-yard touchdown run, Cooper Rothe kick good	27	21
4	1:09	9	58	1:46	Wyoming	Austin Conway 22-yard touchdown reception from Tyler Vander Waal, Cooper Rothe kick good	27	28
4	0:45	3	22	0:17	Wyoming	Xazavian Valladay 27-yard touchdown run, Cooper Rothe kick good	27	35
"TOP" = time of possession. For other American football terms, see Glossary of American football.							27	35

- Passing leaders: Tyler Vander Waal (WYO): 14–26, 225 YDS, 2 TD; Donald Hammond III (AFA): 5–9, 53 YDS, 2 INT
- Rushing Leaders: Jevon Bigelow (WYO): 10 CAR, 36 YDS; Kadin Remsberg (AFA): 20 CAR, 128 YDS
- Receiving Leaders: Tyree Mayfield (WYO): 4 REC, 112 YDS; Marcus Bennett (AFA): 3 REC, 31 YDS

=== At New Mexico ===
	1	2	3	4	Total
Cowboys	7	7	3	14	31
Lobos	0	3	0	0	3

Scoring summary

Quarter	Time	Drive			Team	Scoring information	Score	
Quarter	Time	Plays	Yards	TOP	Team	Scoring information	WYO	UNM
1	12:44	6	75	2:16	Wyoming	Xazavian Valladay 21-yard touchdown run, Cooper Rothe kick good	7	0
2	8:51	13	90	6:48	Wyoming	Nico Evans 30-yard touchdown run, Cooper Rothe kick good	14	0
2	3:08	4	23	2:02	New Mexico	25-yard field goal by Andrew Shelley	14	3
3	5:00	11	70	4:58	Wyoming	37-yard field goal by Cooper Rothe	17	3
4	12:32	6	46	2:59	Wyoming	Austin Conway 11-yard touchdown run, Cooper Rothe kick good	24	3
4	9:24	4	65	2:06	Wyoming	Xazavian Valladay 20-yard touchdown run, Cooper Rothe kick good	31	3
"TOP" = time of possession. For other American football terms, see Glossary of American football.							31	3

- Passing leaders: Tyler Vander Waal (WYO): 4–17, 41 YDS; Coltin Gerhart (UNM): 2–14, 31 YDS, 1 INT
- Rushing Leaders: Xazavian Valladay (WYO): 22 CAR, 192 YDS, 2 TD; Tyrone Owens (UNM): 12 CAR, 18 YDS
- Receiving Leaders: Raghib Ismail Jr. (WYO): 1 REC, 15 YDS; Anu Somoye (UNM): 1 REC, 19 YDS

== Personnel ==
=== Coaching staff ===
Name	Position	Seasons at Wyoming	Alma mater	Before Wyoming
Craig Bohl	Head coach	5	Nebraska (1982)	North Dakota State – Head coach (2013)
Brent Vigen	Associate head coach / offensive coordinator / quarterbacks	5	North Dakota State (1998)	North Dakota State – Offensive coordinator / quarterbacks coach (2013)
Scottie Hazelton	Defensive coordinator / linebackers coach	2	Fort Lewis (1997)	Jacksonville Jaguars – Assistant linebackers coach (2016)
Mike Bath	Co-Special teams coordinator / tight ends coach / fullbacks coach	5	Miami, Ohio (2001)	Miami, Ohio – Interim head coach / offensive coordinator (2013)
A. J. Cooper	Co-Special teams coordinator / defensive ends coach	5	North Dakota State (2006)	North Dakota State – Defensive ends coach / co-special teams coordinator (2013)
Jake Dickert	Safeties Coach	2	Wisconsin–Stevens Point (2007)	South Dakota State – Co-special teams coordinator / safeties coach (2016)
Scott Fuchs	Offensive line coach	5	North Dakota State (1995)	North Dakota State – Offensive line Coach (2013)
Mike Grant	Wide receivers coach	3	Nebraska (1993)	North Texas – Wide receivers coach / receiving coordinator (2014)
Gordie Haug	Running backs coach / Director of player personnel	5	Bemidji State (2009)	North Dakota State – Running backs coach (2013)
Pete Kaligis	Defensive tackles coach / nose tackles coach	10	Washington (1994)	Montana – Offensive line Coach (2008)
John Richardson	Cornerbacks coach	5	North Dakota State (2010)	North Dakota State – Cornerbacks Coach (2013)
Ben Iannacchione	Director of Sports Performance / head strength and conditioning coach	1	Boise State (2008)	LSU – Associate Strength and Conditioning Coach (2017)
Aaron Bohl	Defensive Graduate Assistant	2	Minnesota State Moorhead (2016)	Minnesota State Moorhead – Linebacker (2016)
Jacob Claborn	Offensive Graduate Assistant	3	California Lutheran (2009)	Central Washington – Offensive line Coach (2015)
Taylor Housewright	Offensive Graduate Assistant	1	Ashland (2013)	Ashland – Defensive backs coach / assistant recruiting coordinator (2017)
Jalen Ortiz	Defensive Graduate Assistant	1	Wyoming (2017)	Wyoming – Linebacker (2017)

=== Roster ===
2018 Wyoming Cowboys Football
Quarterback: 11 Nick Szpor – junior (6'3", 212); 12 Sean Chambers (injured) – freshman (6'3", 215); 15 Nick Smith – (redshirt) senior (6'4", 235); 18 Tyler Vander Waal – (redshirt) freshman (6'4", 220); Tailback: 4 Xazavian Valladay – (redshirt) freshman (6'0", 191); 6 Trey Woods – sophomore (6'3", 216); 7 Reow Jackson – freshman (6'2", 205); 21 Jevon Bigelow – freshman (6'2", 195); 22 Nico Evans (C) – (redshirt) senior (5'9", 211); 28 Theo Dawson – freshman (6'0", 220); 29 Kellen Overstreet (injured) – (redshirt) junior (5'11", 209); Fullback: 34 Jeff Burroughs – (redshirt) sophomore (6'1", 241); 35 Jaylon Watson – (redshirt) junior (6'0", 250); 52 Jahmari Moore – (redshirt) sophomore (6'2", 232); 54 Austin Lopez – (redshirt) sophomore (6'3", 234); Wide receiver: 2 Jared Scott – sophomore (6'6", 225); 5 Gunner Gentry – freshman (6'3", 208); 8 Dontae Crow – (redshirt) sophomore (5'9", 178); 9 Isaac Leppke – (redshirt) sophomore (6'4", 198); 13 John Okwoli – junior (6'2", 210); 14 C.J. Johnson (injured) – (redshirt) junior (6'2", 209); 17 Raghib Ismail Jr. – junior (6'0", 186); 19 Ayden Eberhardt – (redshirt) sophomore (6'2", 195); 25 Austin Conway – (redshirt) junior (5'10", 183); 26 Avante' Cox – sophomore (5'11", 171); 39 Justyn Stindt – (redshirt) freshman (6'2", 192); 80 James Price – (redshirt) senior (6'2", 212); 88 Camron Donatlan – freshman (6'2", 195); Tight end: 33 Josh Harshman (injured) – senior (6'3", 230); 81 Austin Fort (C) – (redshirt) senior (6'4", 244); 82 Jackson Marcotte – freshman (6'7", 250); 83 Mason Keeler – (redshirt) freshman (6'6", 248); 84 Nate Weinman – (redshirt) freshman (6'7", 260); 85 Tyree Mayfield – (redshirt) senior (6'3", 241)	Offensive linemen: 55 Gavin Rush – junior (6'3", 305); 57 Patrick Arnold – (redshirt) freshman (6'3", 296); 61 Kaden Jackson – senior (6'2", 303); 62 Rudy Stofer – (redshirt) freshman (6'6", 297); 63 Jason Davis – (redshirt) freshman (6'3", 342); 64 Zach Thatcher – (redshirt) sophomore (6'5", 288); 65 Zach Watts – freshman (6'5", 280); 69 Eric Abojei – (redshirt) freshman (6'5", 351); 72 Zach Wallace – senior (6'7", 314); 73 Keegan Cryder – (redshirt) freshman (6'4", 283); 74 Blayne Baker – freshman (6'5", 260); 75 Frank Crum – freshman (6'7", 260); 76 Justis Borton – sophomore (6'2", 272); 77 Pahl Schwab – (redshirt) junior (6'5", 308); 78 Alonzo Velasquez – sophomore (6'6", 305); 79 Logan Harris – sophomore (6'3", 304); Defensive linemen: 41 Davon Wells-Ross – (redshirt) freshman (6'5", 205); 42 Kevin Prosser – senior (6'2", 227); 44 Victor Jones – (redshirt) freshman (6'4", 256); 51 Payton Lowry-Sanders – senior (6'2", 236); 53 Josiah Hall – (redshirt) junior (6'1", 251); 86 Javaree Jackson – sophomore (6'5", 288); 87 Conner Cain (C) – (redshirt) senior (6'4", 270); 88 Garrett Crall – sophomore (6'5", 242); 90 Gavin Dunayski – (redshirt) freshman (6'6", 249); 91 Carl Granderson – senior (6'5", 261); 92 Solomon Byrd – freshman (6'4", 220); 93 Youhanna Ghaifan (S) – (redshirt) junior (6'4", 282); 94 Cole Godbout – freshman (6'4", 250); 95 De'Vaughn Brown – freshman (6'3", 220); 96 Sidney Malauulu – (redshirt) senior (6'3", 293); 97 Mario Mora – freshman (6'3", 255); 98 Ravontae Holt – sophomore (6'4", 262); Placekickers: 40 Cooper Rothe – junior (5'11", 178); 41 Ryan Galovich – junior (6'0", 192); Punter: 27 Tim Zaleski (injured) – sophomore (6'5", 221); Long snapper: 99 Jesse Hooper – freshman (5'11", 227)	Linebackers: 7 Chavez Pownell Jr. – (redshirt) senior (5'11", 205); 9 Tyler Hall – junior (5'10", 190); 30 Logan Wilson (C) – (redshirt) junior (6'2", 250); 33 Leevi Lafaele – freshman (6'2", 220); 34 Charles Hicks – freshman (6'3", 220); 35 Skyler Miller – (redshirt) sophomore (5'11", 214); 37 Josh Calvert – (redshirt) sophomore (6'0", 264); 43 Ben Wisdorf – (redshirt) junior (6'1", 230); 45 Adam Pilapil – (redshirt) senior (6'1", 220); 46 Cassh Maluia – junior (6'0", 248); 48 Chad Muma – freshman (6'3", 213); 50 Ryan Gatoloai-Faupula – sophomore (6'1", 216); 55 Ryan Mazzola – (redshirt) freshman (6'2", 238); Defensive backs: 2 Cameron Murray – freshman (6'1", 170); 3 Alijah Halliburton – junior (6'2", 190); 4 Antonio Hull – (redshirt) junior (5'10", 188); 5 Esias Gandy – sophomore (6'1", 193); 6 Marcus Epps (C) – (redshirt) senior (6'0", 197); 8 Rome Weber – freshman (5'11", 175); 12 Ja'Lani Ellison – freshman (6'0", 171); 13 Brennan Kutterer – (redshirt) freshman (6'1", 206); 14 Miles Williams – freshman (6'1", 192); 16 Riley Sessions – (redshirt) sophomore (5'11", 200); 18 Keyon Blankenbaker – (redshirt) freshman (5'10", 175); 21 C.J. Coldon (injured) – (redshirt) freshman (6'1", 183); 22 Sidney Washington Jr. – (redshirt) sophomore (5'9", 170); 24 Braden Smith – (redshirt) sophomore (5'10", 195); 28 Andrew Wingard (C) – senior (6'0", 214); 29 Quinten Mercardo – senior (5'10", 188); 31 Dauson Booker – freshman (6'0", 190); 40 Taylor Dodd – (redshirt) freshman (6'2", 197); Legend: (C) Team captain; (S) Suspended; (I) Ineligible; Injured; Redshirt

=== 2018 recruiting class ===
The Cowboys announced an early signing class of 20 high school student-athletes on December 20. On February 24, they announced the signing of two more student-athletes.

College recruiting
Name	Hometown	School	Height	Weight	40^{‡}	Commit date
Blayne Baker; OL	Sheridan, WY	Sheridan HS	6 ft 5 in (1.96 m)	260 lb (120 kg)	—	Jun 26, 2017
Blayne Baker; OL	Recruit ratings: Scout: Rivals: 247Sports: ESPN:					
Jevon Bigelow; RB	Fresno, CA	Central HS	6 ft 2 in (1.88 m)	195 lb (88 kg)	—	Dec 10, 2017
Jevon Bigelow; RB	Recruit ratings: Scout: Rivals: 247Sports: ESPN:					
Dauson Booker; DB	Modesto, CA	Central Catholic HS	6 ft 0 in (1.83 m)	190 lb (86 kg)	—	Dec 20, 2017
Dauson Booker; DB	Recruit ratings: Scout: Rivals: 247Sports: ESPN:					
De'Vaughn Brown; DE	Antioch, CA	Ygnacio Valley HS	6 ft 3 in (1.91 m)	220 lb (100 kg)	—	Dec 20, 2017
De'Vaughn Brown; DE	Recruit ratings: Scout: Rivals: 247Sports: ESPN:					
Solomon Byrd; DE	Palmdale, CA	William J.P. Knight HS	6 ft 4 in (1.93 m)	220 lb (100 kg)	—	Dec 3, 2017
Solomon Byrd; DE	Recruit ratings: Scout: Rivals: 247Sports: ESPN:					
Sean Chambers; QB	Kerman, CA	Kerman HS	6 ft 3 in (1.91 m)	215 lb (98 kg)	—	Oct 3, 2017
Sean Chambers; QB	Recruit ratings: Scout: Rivals: 247Sports: ESPN:					
Frank Crum; OL	Laramie, WY	Laramie HS	6 ft 7 in (2.01 m)	260 lb (120 kg)	—	Oct 18, 2017
Frank Crum; OL	Recruit ratings: Scout: Rivals: 247Sports: ESPN:					
Camron Donatlan; WR	Aurora, IL	West Aurora HS	6 ft 2 in (1.88 m)	200 lb (91 kg)	—	Nov 26, 2017
Camron Donatlan; WR	Recruit ratings: Scout: Rivals: 247Sports: ESPN:					
Ja'Lani Ellison; CB	Reseda, CA	Reseda HS	6 ft 0 in (1.83 m)	160 lb (73 kg)	—	Feb 7, 2018
Ja'Lani Ellison; CB	Recruit ratings: Scout: Rivals: 247Sports: ESPN:					
Gunner Gentry; WR	Aurora, CO	Grandview HS	6 ft 3 in (1.91 m)	200 lb (91 kg)	—	May 31, 2017
Gunner Gentry; WR	Recruit ratings: Scout: Rivals: 247Sports: ESPN:					
Cole Godbout; DT	Hudson, WI	Hudson HS	6 ft 4 in (1.93 m)	250 lb (110 kg)	—	Dec 13, 2017
Cole Godbout; DT	Recruit ratings: Scout: Rivals: 247Sports: ESPN:					
Charles Hicks; LB	San Diego, CA	Lincoln HS	6 ft 3 in (1.91 m)	220 lb (100 kg)	—	Oct 3, 2017
Charles Hicks; LB	Recruit ratings: Scout: Rivals: 247Sports: ESPN:					
Jesse Hooper; LS	Draper, UT	Summit Academy	5 ft 11 in (1.80 m)	230 lb (100 kg)	—	Nov 28, 2017
Jesse Hooper; LS	Recruit ratings: Scout: Rivals: 247Sports: ESPN:					
Raghib Ismail, Jr. WR	Carrollton, TX	Cisco College	6 ft 0 in (1.83 m)	180 lb (82 kg)	—	Feb 19, 2018
Raghib Ismail, Jr. WR	Recruit ratings: Scout: Rivals: 247Sports: ESPN:					
Reow Jackson; ATH	Eugene, OR	Marist Catholic HS	6 ft 2 in (1.88 m)	200 lb (91 kg)	—	Dec 1, 2017
Reow Jackson; ATH	Recruit ratings: Scout: Rivals: 247Sports: ESPN:					
Leevi Lafaele; LB	Sacramento, CA	Inderkum HS	6 ft 2 in (1.88 m)	220 lb (100 kg)	—	Dec 20, 2017
Leevi Lafaele; LB	Recruit ratings: Scout: Rivals: 247Sports: ESPN:					
Jackson Marcotte; TE	Mount Carmel, IL	Mount Carmel HS	6 ft 7 in (2.01 m)	250 lb (110 kg)	—	Jun 26, 2017
Jackson Marcotte; TE	Recruit ratings: Scout: Rivals: 247Sports: ESPN:					
Chad Muma; LB	Lone Tree, CO	Legend HS	6 ft 3 in (1.91 m)	200 lb (91 kg)	—	Oct 11, 2017
Chad Muma; LB	Recruit ratings: Scout: Rivals: 247Sports: ESPN:					
Cameron Murray; DB	Aurora, CO	Overland HS	6 ft 1 in (1.85 m)	175 lb (79 kg)	—	Feb 24, 2017
Cameron Murray; DB	Recruit ratings: Scout: Rivals: 247Sports: ESPN:					
Zach Watts; OL	Windsor, CO	Windsor HS	6 ft 5 in (1.96 m)	280 lb (130 kg)	—	Jul 24, 2017
Zach Watts; OL	Recruit ratings: Scout: Rivals: 247Sports: ESPN:					
Rome Weber; DB	San Bernardino, CA	Cajon HS	5 ft 11 in (1.80 m)	175 lb (79 kg)	—	Nov 27, 2017
Rome Weber; DB	Recruit ratings: Scout: Rivals: 247Sports: ESPN:					
Miles Williams; DB	Oxnard, CA	Pacifica HS	6 ft 1 in (1.85 m)	175 lb (79 kg)	—	Dec 6, 2017
Miles Williams; DB	Recruit ratings: Scout: Rivals: 247Sports: ESPN:					
Overall recruit ranking: Scout: – Rivals: – 247Sports: – ESPN: –
‡ Refers to 40-yard dash; Note: In many cases, Scout, Rivals, 247Sports, On3, and ESPN may conflict in their listings of height, weight and 40 time.; In these cases, the average was taken. ESPN grades are on a 100-point scale.; Sources: "2018 Team Ranking". Rivals.com.

== Awards and honors ==
=== All-conference teams ===
First Team

Nico Evans, Sr., RB

Andrew Wingard, Sr., DB

Cooper Rothe, Jr., PK

Second Team

Carl Granderson, Sr., DL

Honorable Mention

Tyler Hall, Jr., CB

Logan Wilson, Jr., LB

=== Conference awards ===
Cooper Rothe – Special teams Player of the Year

=== All–America teams ===
Keegan Cryder, Fr., C – Freshman All-American (FWAA)

=== All-star games ===
Carl Granderson – Senior Bowl

Andrew Wingard – East–West Shrine Game

Nico Evans – NFLPA Collegiate Bowl

== Statistics ==
=== Team ===
Team Statistics
	Wyoming	Opponents
Points	248	264
First Downs	204	223
Rushing	116	96
Passing	72	111
Penalty	16	16
Rushing Yards	2393	1554
Rushing Attempts	496	424
Average Per Rush	4.8	3.7
Long	75	56
Rushing TDs	19	17
Passing yards	1576	2360
Comp–Att	135–276	241–394
Comp %	48.9%	61.2%
Average Per Game	131.3	196.7
Average per Attempt	5.7	6.0
Passing TDs	8	15
INT's	4	10
Touchdowns	28	33
Passing	8	15
Rushing	19	17
Defensive	1	0
Interceptions	10	4
Yards	123	36
Total Offense	3969	3914
Total Plays	772	818
Average Per Yards/Game	330.8	326.2
Kick Returns: # – Yards	12–235	22–456
TDs	0	1
Long	30	99
Punts	74	68
Yards	2914	2967
Average	39.4	43.6
Punt Returns: # – Yards	27–156	21–136
TDs	0	0
Long	31	41
Fumbles – Fumbles Lost	15–7	13–5
Penalties – Yards	72–596	71–577
3rd–Down Conversions	63/174	69/176
4th–Down Conversions	5/13	11/16
Field Goals	16–17	12–17
Sacks	19	24
Yards	129	204

=== Offense ===
Passing Statistics
NAME	GP	CMP	ATT	YDS	CMP%	TD	INT	RAT
Tyler Vander Waal	11	120	246	1310	48.8	5	4	96.97
Sean Chambers	4	15	25	266	60.0	3	0	188.98
Austin Conway	12	0	1	0	0.0	0	0	0.00
TEAM	7	0	2	0	0.0	0	0	0.00
Nick Smith	3	0	2	0	0.0	0	0	0.00
TOTALS	12	135	276	1576	48.9	8	4	103.54

Rushing Statistics
NAME	GP	CAR	YDS	LONG	TD
Nico Evans	10	204	1325	75	8
Xazavian Valladay	12	71	396	45	3
Sean Chambers	4	59	329	64	2
Jevon Bigelow	9	69	292	39	2
Austin Conway	12	12	80	19	1
Avante' Cox	3	3	37	23	1
Dontae Crow	7	2	11	6	0
James Price	11	2	10	15	0
Ayden Eberhardt	11	1	1	1	0
Brett Brenton	1	1	0	0	0
Raghib Ismail Jr.	11	4	−2	6	0
TEAM	7	7	−23	0	0
Tyler Vander Waal	11	61	−63	19	2
TOTALS	12	496	2393	75	19

Receiving Statistics
NAME	GP	REC	YDS	LONG	TD
James Price	11	26	395	72	1
Tyree Mayfield	12	21	341	60	2
Raghib Ismail Jr.	11	24	267	26	2
Austin Conway	12	32	250	22	1
Austin Fort	9	7	102	41	1
Nico Evans	10	7	66	47	1
Ayden Eberhardt	11	5	46	15	0
Xazavian Valladay	12	4	35	12	0
John Okwoli	12	3	31	17	0
Josh Harshman	3	4	21	11	0
Jared Scott	11	1	17	17	0
Avante' Cox	3	1	5	5	0
TOTALS	12	135	1576	72	8

=== Defense ===
Defensive Statistics
#	NAME	GP	SOLO	AST	TOT	TFL-YDS	SACKS	INT	BU	QBH	FR	FF	BLK	SAF
30	Logan Wilson	12	57	46	103	11.0–30	2.0–9	2	2	1	0	0	0	0
28	Andrew Wingard	12	46	41	87	2.5–6	1.0–5	2	1	2	0	0	0	0
6	Marcus Epps	12	42	21	63	6.5–23	1.0–9	0	8	0	0	1	0	0
3	Alijah Halliburton	12	39	22	61	0.5–0	0.0–0	0	2	0	0	1	0	0
46	Cassh Maluia	11	23	23	46	6.0–7	0.0–0	1	3	1	0	0	0	0
4	Antonio Hull	12	30	14	44	1.0–2	0.0–0	2	8	0	1	1	0	0
91	Carl Granderson	11	28	12	40	7.5–21	3.0–13	1	2	3	0	0	0	0
9	Tyler Hall	11	28	11	39	2.5–4	0.0–0	1	9	0	1	1	0	0
88	Garrett Crall	12	19	19	38	6.5–28	4.5–25	0	1	2	1	1	0	0
93	Youhanna Ghaifan	8	20	14	34	8.0–32	2.0–18	0	4	1	0–0	1	0	0
98	Ravontae Holt	11	10	21	31	1.5–4	0.0–0	0	0	1	1	1	0	0
1	Keyon Blankenbaker	12	22	7	29	0.5–1	0.0–0	0	3	0	0	0	0	0
96	Sidney Malauulu	11	16	12	28	6.0–35	3.0–30	0	0	1	1	0	0	0
45	Adam Pilapil	12	8	17	25	0.0–0	0.0–0	0	1	0	0	0	0	0
7	Chavez Pownell Jr.	11	15	8	23	1.0–0	0.0–0	1	2	0	0	0	0	0
44	Victor Jones	11	6	9	15	0.0–0	0.0–0	0	0	0	0	0	0	0
42	Kevin Prosser	9	8	5	13	3.0–13	1.5–9	0	2	0	0	1	0	0
86	Javaree Jackson	6	4	8	12	0.0–0	0.0–0	0	1	0	0	0	0	0
87	Conner Cain	11	4	7	11	0.0–0	0.0–0	0	1	0	0	0	0	0
21	C.J. Coldon	3	5	3	8	0.0–0	0.0–0	0	1	0	0	0	0	0
53	Josiah Hall	9	4	4	8	2.0–4	0.0–0	0	0	0	0	0	0	0
43	Ben Wisdorf	12	5	2	7	0.0–0	0.0–0	0	0	0	0	0	0	0
92	Solomon Byrd	4	2	3	5	0.0–0	0.0–0	0	0	0	0	0	0	0
5	Esaias Gandy	12	3	1	4	0.0–0	0.0–0	0	0	0	0	0	0	0
19	Ayden Eberhardt	11	2	2	4	0.0–0	0.0–0	0	0	0	0	0	0	0
24	Braden Smith	12	3	1	4	0.0–0	0.0–0	0	0	0	0	0	0	0
85	Tyree Mayfield	12	3	1	4	0.0–0	0.0–0	0	0	0	0	0	0	0
16	Gunner Gentry	10	3	1	4	0.0–0	0.0–0	0	0	0	0	0	0	0
20	Jevon Bigelow	9	1	1	2	1.0–28	0.0–0	0	0	0	0	0	0	1
23	Xazavian Valladay	12	2	0	2	0.0–0	0.0–0	0	0	0	0	0	0	0
48	Chad Muma	11	1	1	2	0.0–0	0.0–0	0	0	0	0	0	0	0
80	James Price	11	2	0	2	0.0–0	0.0–0	0	0	0	0	0	0	0
TM	Team	7	1	1	2	0.0–0	0.0–0	0	0	0	0	0	0	1
14	Miles Williams	4	1	1	2	0.0–0	0.0–0	0	0	0	0	0	0	0
13	Miles Kutterer	7	0	1	1	0.0–0	0.0–0	0	0	0	0	0	0	0
18	Tyler Vander Waal	11	1	0	1	0.0–0	0.0–0	0	0	0	0	0	0	0
40	Cooper Rothe	12	1	0	1	0.0–0	0.0–0	0	0	0	0	0	0	0
62	Rudy Stofer	11	0	1	1	0.0–0	0.0–0	0	0	0	0	0	0	0
2	Sidney Washington	4	1	0	1	0.0–0	0.0–0	0	0	0	0	0	0	0
50	Ryan Gatoloai-Faupula	8	0	1	1	0.0–0	0.0–0	0	1	0	0	0	0	0
8	Dontae Crow	7	0	1	1	0.0–0	0.0–0	0	0	0	0	0	0	0
31	Dauson Booker	5	0	1	1	0.0–0	0.0–0	0	0	0	0	0	0	0
6	Trey Woods	1	1	0	1	1.0–11	1.0–11	0	0	0	0	0	0	0
	TOTAL	12	467	344	811	68–251	19–129	10	51	12	5	8	0	2
	OPPONENTS	12	397	458	855	70–302	24–204	4	33	20	7	12	1	0

Key: SOLO: Solo Tackles, AST: Assisted Tackles, TOT: Total Tackles, TFL: Tackles-for-loss, SACK: Quarterback Sacks, INT: Interceptions, BU: Passes Broken Up, QBH: Quarterback Hits, FF: Forced Fumbles, FR: Fumbles Recovered, BLK: Kicks or Punts Blocked, SAF: Safeties

Interceptions Statistics
NAME	NO.	YDS	AVG	TD	LNG
Logan Wilson	2	21	10.5	0	13
Andrew Wingard	2	0	0.0	0	0
Antonio Hull	2	15	7.5	0	15
Cassh Maluia	1	0	0.0	0	0
Carl Granderson	1	61	61.0	1	61
Tyler Hall	1	26	26.0	0	26
Chavez Pownell Jr.	1	0	0.0	0	0
TOTALS	10	123	12.3	1	61

=== Special teams ===
Kicking statistics
NAME	XPM	XPA	XP%	FGM	FGA	FG%	1–19	20–29	30–39	40–49	50+	LNG	PTS
Cooper Rothe	28	28	100.0%	16	17	94.1%	0–0	5–5	6–6	4–5	1–1	51	76
TOTALS	28	28	100.0%	16	17	94.1%	0–0	5–5	6–6	4–5	1–1	51	76

Kick return statistics
NAME	RTNS	YDS	AVG	TD	LNG
Tyler Hall	5	112	22.4	0	28
Austin Conway	4	84	21.0	0	30
John Okwoli	1	23	23.0	0	23
Avante' Cox	1	13	13.0	0	13
Jaylon Watson	1	3	3.0	0	3
TOTALS	12	235	19.6	0	30

Punting statistics
NAME	PUNTS	YDS	AVG	LONG	TB	FC	I–20	50+	BLK
Tim Zaleski	36	1395	38.8	52	3	8	9	2	0
Dontae Crow	24	1026	42.8	68	2	9	5	4	0
Ryan Galovich	13	493	38.9	68	2	4	7	2	0
TEAM	1	0	0.0	0	0	0	0	0	1
TOTALS	74	2914	39.4	68	7	21	21	8	1

Punt return statistics
NAME	RTNS	YDS	AVG	TD	LONG
Austin Conway	27	156	5.8	0	31
TOTALS	27	156	5.8	0	31

=== Scores by quarter (all opponents) ===
	1	2	3	4	Total
All opponents	40	66	76	82	264
Wyoming	44	47	75	82	248

== Players in the 2019 NFL draft ==
Player	Position	Round	Pick	NFL club
Marcus Epps	S	6	191	Minnesota Vikings
Andrew Wingard	S	UDFA	—	Jacksonville Jaguars
Carl Granderson	DE	UDFA	—	New Orleans Saints
Tyree Mayfield	TE	UDFA	—	San Francisco 49ers
Nico Evans	RB	UDFA	—	Philadelphia Eagles
Sidney Malauulu	DT	UDFA	—	San Francisco 49ers
Austin Fort	TE	UDFA	—	Denver Broncos
