= 2018 San Jose State Spartans football team =

American college football season

2018 San Jose State Spartans football
- Conference: Mountain West Conference
- West Division
- Record: 1–11 (1–7 MW)
- Head coach: Brent Brennan (2nd season)
- Offensive coordinator: Kevin McGiven (1st season)
- Offensive scheme: Spread option
- Defensive coordinator: Derrick Odum (2nd season)
- Base defense: 3–4
- Home stadium: CEFCU Stadium

Uniform
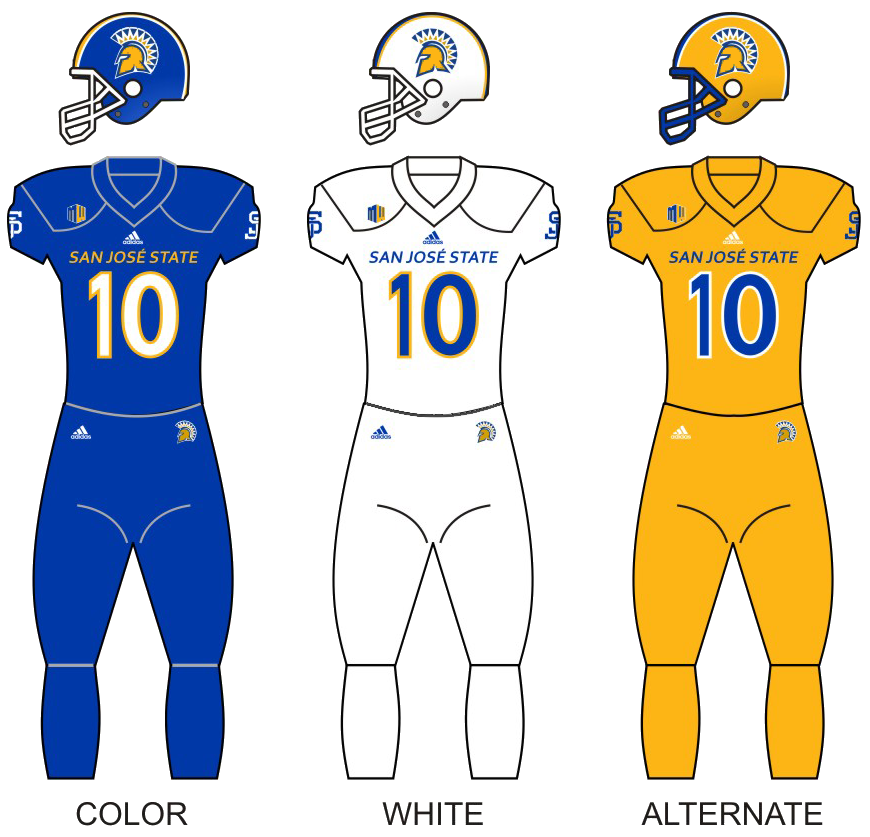

2018 Mountain West Conference football standings
	Conf.			Overall
Team	W		L	W		L
Mountain Division
No. 23 Boise State x	7	–	1	10	–	3
No. 22 Utah State	7	–	1	11	–	2
Wyoming	4	–	4	6	–	6
Air Force	3	–	5	5	–	7
Colorado State	2	–	6	3	–	9
New Mexico	1	–	7	3	–	9
West Division
No. 18 Fresno State x$	7	–	1	12	–	2
Nevada	5	–	3	8	–	5
Hawaii	5	–	3	8	–	6
San Diego State	4	–	4	7	–	6
UNLV	2	–	6	4	–	8
San Jose State	1	–	7	1	–	11
Championship: Fresno State 19, Boise State 16 (OT)
$ – Conference champion; x – Division champion/co-champions; y – Championship game participant; Rankings from AP Poll

The 2018 San Jose State Spartans football team represented San Jose State University in the 2018 NCAA Division I FBS football season. The Spartans were led by second-year head coach Brent Brennan and played their home games at CEFCU Stadium. San José State was a member of the Mountain West Conference in the West Division. They finished the season 1–11, 1–7 in Mountain West play to finish in last place in the West Division.

== Recruiting ==
=== Position key ===
Back	B	Center	C	Cornerback	CB	Defensive back	DB
Defensive end	DE	Defensive lineman	DL	Defensive tackle	DT	End	E
Fullback	FB	Guard	G	Halfback	HB	Kicker	K
Kickoff returner	KR	Offensive tackle	OT	Offensive lineman	OL	Linebacker	LB
Long snapper	LS	Punter	P	Punt returner	PR	Quarterback	QB
Running back	RB	Safety	S	Tight end	TE	Wide receiver	WR

=== Recruits ===
The Spartans signed a total of 24 recruits.

College recruiting (2018)
Name	Hometown	School	Height	Weight	Commit date
Lionel Anderson; CB	Hayward, California	Moreau Catholic High School	5 ft 11 in (1.80 m)	165 lb (75 kg)	Feb 6, 2018
Lionel Anderson; CB	Recruit ratings: Scout: Rivals: 247Sports:				
Max Barth; OT	Stockton, California	St. Mary's High School	6 ft 6 in (1.98 m)	280 lb (130 kg)	Feb 1, 2018
Max Barth; OT	Recruit ratings: Scout: Rivals: 247Sports:				
Charlie Bostic; CB	San Jose, California	Valley Christian High School	6 ft 0 in (1.83 m)	170 lb (77 kg)	Oct 9, 2017
Charlie Bostic; CB	Recruit ratings: Scout: Rivals: 247Sports:				
Jermaine Braddock; WR	Covina, California	Charter Oak High School	6 ft 0 in (1.83 m)	195 lb (88 kg)	Feb 9, 2018
Jermaine Braddock; WR	Recruit ratings: Scout: Rivals: 247Sports:				
Bobby Brown; CB	Lancaster, California	College of the Canyons	6 ft 0 in (1.83 m)	177 lb (80 kg)	Dec 20, 2017
Bobby Brown; CB	Recruit ratings: Scout: Rivals: 247Sports:				
Lorenzo Burkes; FB	Carmichael, California	Jesuit High School	6 ft 1 in (1.85 m)	225 lb (102 kg)	Oct 20, 2017
Lorenzo Burkes; FB	Recruit ratings: Scout: Rivals: 247Sports:				
Junior Fehoko; TE–Y	Mountain View, California	Saint Francis High School	6 ft 3 in (1.91 m)	200 lb (91 kg)	Feb 3, 2018
Junior Fehoko; TE–Y	Recruit ratings: Scout: Rivals: 247Sports:				
Cade Hall; DE	San Jose, California	Bellarmine College Preparatory	6 ft 3 in (1.91 m)	226 lb (103 kg)	Nov 26, 2017
Cade Hall; DE	Recruit ratings: Scout: Rivals: 247Sports:				
Isaiah Hamilton; WR	Covina, California	Charter Oak High School	5 ft 11 in (1.80 m)	180 lb (82 kg)	Feb 9, 2018
Isaiah Hamilton; WR	Recruit ratings: Scout: Rivals: 247Sports:				
Kyle Harmon; ILB	Oakley, California	Freedom High School	6 ft 1 in (1.85 m)	230 lb (100 kg)	Dec 20, 2017
Kyle Harmon; ILB	Recruit ratings: Scout: Rivals: 247Sports:				
Tre Jenkins; S	Stockton, California	St. Mary's High School	5 ft 10 in (1.78 m)	191 lb (87 kg)	Jan 20, 2018
Tre Jenkins; S	Recruit ratings: Scout: Rivals: 247Sports:				
Korey Mariboho; OG	Mission Viejo, California	Saddleback College	6 ft 3 in (1.91 m)	285 lb (129 kg)	Dec 4, 2017
Korey Mariboho; OG	Recruit ratings: Scout: Rivals: 247Sports:				
Nick Nash; ATH	Irvine, California	Woodbridge High School	6 ft 2 in (1.88 m)	180 lb (82 kg)	Feb 9, 2018
Nick Nash; ATH	Recruit ratings: Scout: Rivals: 247Sports:				
Jamie Navarro; OG	Temecula, California	Great Oak High School	6 ft 3 in (1.91 m)	265 lb (120 kg)	Jun 19, 2017
Jamie Navarro; OG	Recruit ratings: Scout: Rivals: 247Sports:				
Jalen Nelson; CB	Chula Vista, California	Southwestern College	6 ft 1 in (1.85 m)	180 lb (82 kg)	Dec 10, 2017
Jalen Nelson; CB	Recruit ratings: Scout: Rivals: 247Sports:				
Leki Nunn; WR	San Mateo, California	Junipero Serra High School	5 ft 10 in (1.78 m)	175 lb (79 kg)	Dec 20, 2017
Leki Nunn; WR	Recruit ratings: Scout: Rivals: 247Sports:				
Tyler Ostrom; OG	Ventura, California	St. Bonaventure High School	6 ft 2 in (1.88 m)	282 lb (128 kg)	Aug 2, 2017
Tyler Ostrom; OG	Recruit ratings: Scout: Rivals: 247Sports:				
Anthony Pardue; OG	Murrieta, California	Murrieta Valley High School	6 ft 3 in (1.91 m)	292 lb (132 kg)	Dec 13, 2017
Anthony Pardue; OG	Recruit ratings: Scout: Rivals: 247Sports:				
Michael Pryor; OLB	Pittsburg, California	Pittsburg High School	6 ft 1 in (1.85 m)	220 lb (100 kg)	Feb 9, 2018
Michael Pryor; OLB	Recruit ratings: Scout: Rivals: 247Sports:				
Kairee Robinson; RB	Concord, California	De La Salle High School	5 ft 8 in (1.73 m)	185 lb (84 kg)	Jan 29, 2018
Kairee Robinson; RB	Recruit ratings: Scout: Rivals: 247Sports:				
Dimitri Sakalia; DE	Atherton, California	Menlo High School	6 ft 3 in (1.91 m)	240 lb (110 kg)	Nov 28, 2017
Dimitri Sakalia; DE	Recruit ratings: Scout: Rivals: 247Sports:				
Nehemiah Shelton; CB	Long Beach, California	Long Beach City College	6 ft 0 in (1.83 m)	170 lb (77 kg)	Dec 20, 2017
Nehemiah Shelton; CB	Recruit ratings: Scout: Rivals: 247Sports:				
Isaak Togia; OLB	Oxnard, California	Pacifica High School	6 ft 0 in (1.83 m)	197 lb (89 kg)	Jan 10, 2018
Isaak Togia; OLB	Recruit ratings: Scout: Rivals: 247Sports:				
Demanuel Tulauti; DT	San Diego, California	Madison High School	6 ft 2 in (1.88 m)	275 lb (125 kg)	Feb 9, 2018
Demanuel Tulauti; DT	Recruit ratings: Scout: Rivals: 247Sports:				
Overall recruit ranking:
Note: In many cases, Scout, Rivals, 247Sports, On3, and ESPN may conflict in their listings of height and weight.; In these cases, the average was taken. ESPN grades are on a 100-point scale.; Sources: "San Jose State Football Commitments". Rivals.; "2018 Team Ranking". Rivals.com.

== Preseason ==
=== Award watch lists ===
Listed in the order that they were released

Award	Player	Position	Year
John Mackey Award	Josh Oliver	TE	SR
Lou Groza Award	Bryce Crawford	K	SR
Wuerffel Trophy	Bryce Crawford	K	SR

=== Mountain West media days ===
During the Mountain West media days held July 24–25 at the Cosmopolitan on the Las Vegas Strip, the Spartans were predicted to finish in last place in the West Division. They did not have any players selected to the preseason all-Mountain West team.

== Schedule ==
Date	Time	Opponent	Site	TV	Result	Attendance
August 30	7:00 p.m.	UC Davis*	CEFCU Stadium; San Jose, CA		L 38–44	12,675
September 8	8:00 p.m.	at Washington State*	Martin Stadium; Pullman, WA	P12N	L 0–31	26,141
September 15	2:00 p.m.	at No. 20 Oregon*	Autzen Stadium; Eugene, OR	P12N	L 22–35	50,049
September 29	4:00 p.m.	Hawaii^{†}	CEFCU Stadium; San Jose, CA (rivalry)	SPECTSN	L 41–44 ^{5OT}	16,363
October 6	7:30 p.m.	Colorado State	CEFCU Stadium; San Jose, CA	CBSSN	L 30–42	13,802
October 13	12:30 p.m.	vs. Army*	Levi's Stadium; Santa Clara, CA	ESPNU	L 3–52	15,627
October 20	7:30 p.m.	at San Diego State	SDCCU Stadium; San Diego, CA	CBSSN	L 13–16	30,451
October 27	3:30 p.m.	UNLV	CEFCU Stadium; San Jose, CA	AT&TSN	W 50–37	16,165
November 3	11:00 a.m.	at Wyoming	War Memorial Stadium; Laramie, WY	AT&TSN	L 9–24	13,238
November 10	1:00 p.m.	at No. 14 Utah State	Maverik Stadium; Logan, UT	Facebook	L 24–62	19,017
November 17	12:00 p.m.	Nevada	CEFCU Stadium; San Jose, CA	ESPN3	L 12–21	12,271
November 24	4:00 p.m.	at Fresno State	Bulldog Stadium; Fresno, CA (Battle for the Valley)	ESPNU	L 13–31	26,162
*Non-conference game; ^{†}Homecoming; Rankings from AP Poll released prior to the game; All times are in Pacific time

== Game summaries ==
=== UC Davis ===
UC Davis Aggies at San Jose State Spartans

Quarter	1	2	3	4	Total
Aggies	14	21	2	7	44
Spartans	14	7	10	7	38

at CEFCU Stadium, San Jose, California

- Date: August 30, 2018
- Game time: 7:06 p.m. PDT
- Game weather: Clear, 71 °F (22 °C)
- Game attendance: 12,675
- Referee: Kevin Boltmann
- UC Davis tops San Jose State 44–38 in first FCS-FBS upset, Game Book

Game information

First Quarter

- UCD – Ulonzo Gilliam 5-yard run (Matt Blair kick), 11:58. Aggies 7–0. Drive: 12 plays, 75 yards, 3:02.
- SJSU – JaQuan Blackwell 5-yard pass from Josh Love (Bryce Crawford kick), 9:33. Tie 7–7. Drive: 2 plays, 1 yard, 0:00.
- SJSU – Tyler Nevens 2-yard run (Bryce Crawford kick), 5:54. Spartans 14–7. Drive: 7 plays, 66 yards, 1:22.
- UCD – Ulonzo Gilliam 1-yard run (Matt Blair kick), 2:21. Tie 14–14. Drive: 3 plays, 77 yards, 0:00.

Second Quarter

- UCD – Wesley Preece 22-yard pass from Jake Maier (Matt Blair kick), 14:56. Aggies 21–14. Drive: 5 plays, 63 yards, 1:29.
- UCD – Jared Harrell 49-yard pass from Jake Maier (Matt Blair kick), 13:26. Aggies 28–14. Drive: 4 plays, 79 yards, 0:00.
- SJSU – Tyler Nevens 23-yard run (Bryce Crawford kick), 11:29. Aggies 28–21. Drive: 6 plays, 75 yards, 1:51.
- UCD – Carson Crawford 9-yard run (Matt Blair kick), 9:54. Aggies 35–21. Drive: 5 plays, 75 yards, 1:30.

Third Quarter

- UCD – Team safety, 14:51. Aggies 37–21. Drive: 1 play, −10 yards, 0:00.
- SJSU – Bryce Crawford 29-yard field goal, 2:10. Aggies 37–24. Drive: 13 plays, 69 yards, 5:21.
- SJSU – Bailey Gaither 79-yard pass from Montel Aaron (Bryce Crawford kick), 0:02. Aggies 37–31. Drive: 1 play, 79 yards, 0:00.

Fourth Quarter

- UCD – Ulonzo Gilliam 18-yard pass from Jake Maier (Matt Blair kick), 13:46. Aggies 44–31. Drive: 6 plays, 65 yards, 1:16.
- SJSU – Bailey Gaither 17-yard pass from Montel Aaron (Bryce Crawford kick), 1:24. Aggies 44–38. Drive: 8 plays, 80 yards, 1:49.

Passing

- UCD – Jake Maier – 37/55, 446 yards, 3 TD, 1 INT
- SJSU – Montel Aaron – 13/19, 254 yards, 2 TD

Rushing

- UCD – Ulonzo Gilliam – 23 rushes, 132 yards, 2 TD
- SJSU – Tyler Nevens – 18 rushes, 79 yards, 2 TD

Receiving

- UCD – Jared Harrell – 5 receptions, 87 yards, 1 TD
- SJSU – Bailey Gaither – 6 receptions, 137 yards, 2 TD

=== At Washington State ===
San Jose State Spartans at Washington State Cougars

Quarter	1	2	3	4	Total
Spartans	0	0	0	0	0
Cougars	14	10	0	7	31

at Martin Stadium, Pullman, Washington

- Date: September 8, 2018
- Game time: 8:02 p.m. PDT
- Game weather: Partly cloudy, 62 °F (17 °C)
- Game attendance: 26,141
- Referee: Chris Coyte
- TV announcers (P12N): Guy Haberman, Ryan Leaf, and Cindy Brunson
- Minshew leads Washington State over San Jose State 31–0, Game Book

Game information

First Quarter

- WSU – Davontavean Martin 15-yard pass from Gardner Minshew (Blake Mazza Kick), 12:55. Cougars 7–0. Drive: 6 plays, 70 yards, 2:05.
- WSU – Davontavean Martin 36-yard pass from Gardner Minshew (Blake Mazza Kick), 5:45. Cougars 14–0. Drive: 13 plays, 85 yards, 5:30.

Second Quarter

- WSU – Blake Mazza 36-yard field goal, 5:48. Cougars 17–0. Drive: 5 plays, 26 yards, 1:47
- WSU – Gardner Minshew 1-yard run (Blake Mazza Kick), 0:00. Cougars 24–0. Drive: 11 plays, 54 yards, 3:13.

Third Quarter
Fourth Quarter

- WSU – James Williams 3-yard pass from Gardner Minshew (Blake Mazza Kick), 4:39. Cougars 31–0. Drive: 6 plays, 75 yards, 3:03.

Passing

- SJSU – Montel Aaron – 13/25, 94 yards
- WSU – Gardner Minshew – 34/51, 414 yards, 3 TD, 2 INT

Rushing

- SJSU – Malike Roberson – 12 rushes, 33 yards
- WSU – Max Borghi – 10 rushes, 46 yards

Receiving

- SJSU – Josh Oliver – 5 receptions, 51 yards
- WSU – Travell Harris – 6 receptions, 83 yards

=== At Oregon ===
San Jose State Spartans at No. 20 Oregon Ducks

Quarter	1	2	3	4	Total
Spartans	0	6	6	10	22
No. 20 Ducks	14	7	7	7	35

at Autzen Stadium, Eugene, Oregon

- Date: September 15, 2018
- Game time: 2:02 p.m. PDT
- Game weather: Mostly cloudy, 64 °F (18 °C)
- Game attendance: 50,049
- Referee: Brandon Cruse
- TV announcers (P12N): Roxy Bernstein, Anthony Herron, and Lewis Johnson
- No. 20 Ducks dispatch San Jose State 35–22; Stanford up next, Game Book

Game information

First Quarter

- ORE – Cyrus Habibi-Likio 3-yard run (Zach Emerson Kick), 11:18. Ducks 7–0. Drive: 4 plays, 23 yards, 1:36.
- ORE – Jake Breeland 66-yard pass from Justin Herbert (Zach Emerson Kick), 7:10. Ducks 14–0. Drive: 5 plays, 80 yards, 1:45.

Second Quarter

- SJSU – Bryce Crawford 31-yard field goal, 10:56. Ducks 14–3. Drive: 7 plays, 27 yards, 2:06.
- SJSU – Bryce Crawford 28-yard field goal, 2:58. Ducks 14–6. Drive: 8 plays, 63 yards, 3:15.
- ORE – Johnny Johnson III 39-yard pass from Justin Herbert (Zach Emerson Kick), 2:28. Ducks 21–6. Drive: 3 plays, 58 yards, 0:30.

Third Quarter

- ORE – Cyrus Habibi-Likio 1-yard run (Zach Emerson Kick), 9:46. Ducks 28–6. Drive: 5 plays, 22 yards, 2:13.
- SJSU – Josh Oliver 7-yard pass from Josh Love, 5:00. Ducks 28–12. Drive: 7 plays, 82 yards, 3:16.

Fourth Quarter

- ORE – Johnny Johnson III 22-yard pass from Justin Herbert (Zach Emerson Kick), 14:49. Ducks 35–12. Drive: 12 plays, 77 yards, 5:11.
- SJSU – Bryce Crawford 25-yard field goal, 13:42. Ducks 35–15. Drive: 4 plays, −4 yards, 1:07.
- SJSU – Malike Roberson 1-yard run (Bryce Crawford Kick), 4:03. Ducks 35–22. Drive: 3 plays, 65 yards, 1:06.

Passing

- SJSU – Josh Love – 15/31, 238 yards, 1 TD, 2 INT
- ORE – Justin Herbert – 16/34, 309 yards, 3 TD, 2 INT

Rushing

- SJSU – Malike Roberson – 16 rushes, 25 yards, 1 TD
- ORE – C. J. Verdell – 15 rushes, 42 yards

Receiving

- SJSU – Bailey Gaither – 6 receptions, 90 yards
- ORE – Jake Breeland – 3 receptions, 92 yards, 1 TD

=== Hawaii ===
Hawaii Rainbow Warriors at San Jose State Spartans

Quarter	1	2	3	4	OT	2OT	3OT	4OT	5OT	Total
Rainbow Warriors	3	7	6	15	7	0	0	3	3	44
Spartans	0	17	7	7	7	0	0	3	0	41

at CEFCU Stadium, San Jose, California

- Date: September 29, 2018
- Game time: 4:07 p.m. PDT
- Game weather: Clear, 76 °F (24 °C)
- Game attendance: 16,363
- Referee: Michael VanderVelde
- TV announcers (SPECTSN): Robert Kekaula and Rich Miano
- Meskell's field goal ends 5 OT thriller for Hawaii, 44–41, Game Book

Game information

First Quarter

- HAW – Ryan Meskell 25-yard field goal, 7:45. Rainbow Warriors 3–0. Drive: 15 plays, 68 yards, 7:15.

Second Quarter

- SJSU – Boogie Roberts 2-yard run (Bryce Crawford Kick), 14:25. Spartans 7–3. Drive: 7 plays, 68 yards, 2:45.
- SJSU – Bailey Gaither 55-yard pass from Josh Love (Bryce Crawford Kick), 10:04. Spartans 14–3. Drive: 1 play, 55 yards, 0:09.
- SJSU – Bryce Crawford 24-yard field goal, 6:12. Spartans 17–3. Drive: 5 plays, 63 yards, 2:33.
- HAW – Elijah Dale 18-yard pass from Cole McDonald (Ryan Meskell Kick), 2:21. Spartans 17–10. Drive: 7 plays, 67 yards, 3:51.

Third Quarter

- HAW – John Ursua 3-yard pass from Cole McDonald, 9:13. Spartans 17–16. Drive: 8 plays, 55 yards, 3:56.
- SJSU – Josh Oliver 14-yard pass from Josh Love (Bryce Crawford Kick), 8:20. Spartans 24–16. Drive: 4 plays, 27 yards, 0:41.

Fourth Quarter

- HAW – John Ursua 3-yard pass from Cole McDonald (Two-point conversion), 12:45. Tie 24–24. Drive: 14 plays, 80 yards, 5:59.
- SJSU – Malike Roberson 4-yard pass from Josh Love (Bryce Crawford Kick), 10:07. Spartans 31–24. Drive: 6 plays, 66 yards, 2:38.
- HAW – John Ursua 4-yard pass from Cole McDonald (Ryan Meskell Kick), 4:34. Tie 31–31. Drive: 12 plays, 75 yards, 5:33.

Overtime

- HAW – Dayton Furuta 1-yard run (Ryan Meskell Kick). Rainbow Warriors 38–31. Drive: 6 plays, 25 yards.
- SJSU – Malike Roberson 13-yard run (Bryce Crawford Kick). Tie 38–38. Drive: 3 plays, 25 yards.
- SJSU – Bryce Crawford 20-yard field goal. Spartans 41–38. Drive: 6 plays, 22 yards.
- HAW – Ryan Meskell 35-yard field goal. Tie 41–41. Drive: 4 plays, 8 yards.
- HAW – Ryan Meskell 35-yard field goal. Rainbow Warriors 44–41. Drive: 6 plays, 8 yards.

Passing

- HAW – Cole McDonald – 34/57, 341 yards, 4 TD, 1 INT
- SJSU – Josh Love – 28/49, 451 yards, 3 TD

Rushing

- HAW – Fred Holly – 11 rushes, 52 yards
- SJSU – Malike Roberson – 16 rushes, 47 yards, 1 TD

Receiving

- HAW – John Ursua – 13 receptions, 148 yards, 3 TD
- SJSU – Josh Oliver – 8 receptions, 158 yards, 1 TD

=== Colorado State ===
Colorado State Rams at San Jose State Spartans

Quarter	1	2	3	4	Total
Rams	14	14	0	14	42
Spartans	0	0	30	0	30

at CEFCU Stadium, San Jose, California

- Date: October 6, 2018
- Game time: 7:37 p.m. PDT
- Game weather: Clear, 66 °F (19 °C)
- Game attendance: 13,802
- Referee: Cam McNeill
- TV announcers (CBSSN): Rich Waltz, Aaron Murray, and Jordan Daigle
- Carta, Colorado St. beat San Jose State 42–30, Game Book

Game information

First Quarter

- CSU – Preston Williams 5-yard pass from K. J. Carta-Samuels (Wyatt Bryan Kick), 10:57. Rams 7–0. Drive: 6 plays, 77 yards, 2:51.
- CSU – Preston Williams 16-yard pass from K. J. Carta-Samuels (Wyatt Bryan Kick), 3:04. Rams 14–0. Drive: 5 plays, 55 yards, 2:41.

Second Quarter

- CSU – Warren Jackson 16-yard pass from K. J. Carta-Samuels (Wyatt Bryan Kick), 3:24. Rams 21–0. Drive: 12 plays, 87 yards, 4:43.
- CSU – Warren Jackson 8-yard pass from K. J. Carta-Samuels (Wyatt Bryan Kick), 0:23. Rams 28–0. Drive: 5 plays, 42 yards, 1:55.

Third Quarter

- SJSU – Tre Hartley 24-yard pass from Josh Love (Bryce Crawford Kick), 7:47. Rams 28–7. Drive: 3 plays, 25 yards, 0:50.
- SJSU – Tyler Nevens 6-yard run (Bryce Crawford Kick), 5:17. Rams 28–14. Drive: 4 plays, 61 yards, 1:08.
- SJSU – Tre Hartley 51-yard pass from Josh Love (Bryce Crawford Kick), 2:08. Rams 28–21. Drive: 4 plays, 77 yards, 1:10.
- SJSU – Thai Cottrell 1-yard pass from Josh Love (Bryce Crawford Kick), 0:28. Tie 28–28. Drive: 4 plays, 17 yards, 1:30.
- SJSU – Team safety, 0:23. Spartans 30–28. Drive: 1 play, −2 yards, 0:03.

Fourth Quarter

- CSU – Izzy Matthews 1-yard run (Wyatt Bryan Kick), 11:26. Rams 35–30. Drive: 11 plays, 83 yards, 3:24.
- CSU – Rashad Ajayi 55-yard interception return (Wyatt Bryan Kick), 9:48. Rams 42–30. Drive: 3 plays, −5 yards, 1:30.

Passing

- CSU – K. J. Carta-Samuels – 14/27, 162 yards, 4 TD, 2 INT
- SJSU – Josh Love – 17/40, 232 yards, 3 TD, 2 INT

Rushing

- CSU – Izzy Matthews – 22 rushes, 125 yards, 1 TD
- SJSU – Tyler Nevens – 20 rushes, 73 yards, 1 TD

Receiving

- CSU – Preston Williams – 4 receptions, 67 yards, 2 TD
- SJSU – Tre Hartley – 4 receptions, 96 yards, 2 TD

=== Vs. Army ===
Army Black Knights vs. San Jose State Spartans

Quarter	1	2	3	4	Total
Black Knights	0	14	24	14	52
Spartans	3	0	0	0	3

at Levi's Stadium, Santa Clara, California

- Date: October 13, 2018
- Game time: 12:32 p.m. PDT
- Game weather: Clear, 77 °F (25 °C)
- Game attendance: 15,627
- Referee: Kevin Hassell
- TV announcers (ESPNU): Mike Corey and Rene Ingoglia
- Hopkins scores 4 TDs to lead Army past San Jose State 52–3, Game Book

Game information

First Quarter

- SJSU – Bryce Crawford 49-yard field goal, 4:14. Spartans 3–0. Drive: 13 plays, 46 yards, 6:37.

Second Quarter

- ARMY – Jordan Asberry 41-yard pass from Kelvin Hopkins (John Abercrombie Kick), 14:53. Black Knights 7–3. Drive: 8 plays, 75 yards, 4:21.
- ARMY – Kelvin Hopkins 1-yard run (John Abercrombie Kick), 0:12. Black Knights 14–3. Drive: 12 plays, 57 yards, 6:22.

Third Quarter

- ARMY – Kelvin Hopkins 24-yard run (John Abercrombie Kick), 9:06. Black Knights 21–3. Drive: 11 plays, 75 yards, 5:54.
- ARMY – John Abercrombie 33-yard field goal, 7:39. Black Knights 24–3. Drive: 4 plays, 3 yards, 1:22.
- ARMY – Darnell Woolfolk 1-yard run (John Abercrombie Kick), 6:18. Black Knights 31–3. Drive: 2 plays, 10 yards, 1:12.
- ARMY – Kelvin Hopkins 4-yard run (John Abercrombie Kick), 1:44. Black Knights 38–3. Drive: 8 plays, 35 yards, 3:31.

Fourth Quarter

- ARMY – James Nachtigal 52-yard fumble return (John Abercrombie Kick), 14:32. Black Knights 45–3. Drive: 5 plays, 29 yards, 2:05.
- ARMY – Cam Thomas 28-yard run (John Abercrombie Kick), 5:05. Black Knights 52–3. Drive: 9 plays, 80 yards, 4:59.

Passing

- ARMY – Kelvin Hopkins – 2/5, 54 yards, 1 TD
- SJSU – Montel Aaron – 12/17, 118 yards

Rushing

- ARMY – Kelvin Hopkins – 18 rushes, 99 yards, 3 TD
- SJSU – Tyler Nevens – 11 rushes, 43 yards

Receiving

- ARMY – Jordan Asberry – 1 reception, 41 yards, 1 TD
- SJSU – Thai Cottrell – 3 receptions, 27 yards

=== At San Diego State ===
San Jose State Spartans at San Diego State Aztecs

Quarter	1	2	3	4	Total
Spartans	6	0	7	0	13
Aztecs	0	10	3	3	16

at SDCCU Stadium, San Diego

- Date: October 20, 2018
- Game time: 7:37 p.m. PDT
- Game weather: Clear, 70 °F (21 °C)
- Game attendance: 30,451
- Referee: Kevin Boltmann
- TV announcers (CBSSN): Carter Blackburn, Aaron Taylor, and John Schriffen
- Baron's 3 FGs help San Diego St. beat San Jose St. 16–13, Game Book

Game information

First Quarter

- SJSU – Bryce Crawford 42-yard field goal, 8:56. Spartans 3–0. Drive: 12 plays, 52 yards, 3:57.
- SJSU – Bryce Crawford 24-yard field goal, 6:25. Spartans 6–0. Drive: 8 plays, 28 yards, 2:25.

Second Quarter

- SDSU – Chase Jasmin 1-yard run (John Baron II Kick), 13:11. Aztecs 7–6. Drive: 17 plays, 75 yards, 8:14.
- SDSU – John Baron II 36-yard field goal, 0:16. Aztecs 10–6. Drive: 13 plays, 74 yards, 6:29.

Third Quarter

- SDSU – John Baron II 22-yard field goal, 7:09. Aztecs 13–6. Drive: 10 plays, 85 yards, 4:32.
- SJSU – Malike Roberson 1-yard run (Bryce Crawford Kick), 0:50. Tie 13–13. Drive: 14 plays, 65 yards, 6:19.

Fourth Quarter

- SDSU – John Baron II 51-yard field goal, 4:36. Aztecs 16–13. Drive: 4 plays, 1 yard, 2:39.

Passing

- SJSU – Josh Love – 26/36, 215 yards, 1 INT
- SDSU – Ryan Agnew – 7/11, 86 yards

Rushing

- SJSU – Tyler Nevens – 20 rushes, 60 yards
- SDSU – Chance Bell – 15 rushes, 81 yards

Receiving

- SJSU – Tre Hartley – 6 receptions, 68 yards
- SDSU – Fred Trevillion – 2 receptions, 37 yards

=== UNLV ===
UNLV Rebels at San Jose State Spartans

Quarter	1	2	3	4	Total
Rebels	7	14	7	9	37
Spartans	7	17	17	9	50

at CEFCU Stadium, San Jose, California

- Date: October 27, 2018
- Game time: 3:38 p.m. PDT
- Game weather: Clear, 74 °F (23 °C)
- Game attendance: 16,165
- Referee: Stephen Baron
- TV announcers (AT&TSN): Drew Goodman, Sherdrick Bonner, and Brad Thompson
- Love leads Spartans to first win; 50–37 over UNLV, Game Book

Game information

First Quarter

- UNLV – Max Gilliam 6-yard run (Evan Pantels Kick), 7:39. Rebels 7–0. Drive: 6 plays, 47 yards, 2:26.
- SJSU – Tyler Nevens 4-yard run (Bryce Crawford Kick), 6:16. Tie 7–7. Drive: 4 plays, 75 yards, 1:23.

Second Quarter

- SJSU – Josh Oliver 2-yard pass from Josh Love (Bryce Crawford Kick), 12:28. Spartans 14–7. Drive: 12 plays, 58 yards, 5:17.
- SJSU – Bryce Crawford 50-yard field goal, 6:25. Spartans 17–7. Drive: 4 plays, 2 yards, 2:02.
- UNLV – Tyleek Collins 75-yard pass from Max Gilliam (Evan Pantels Kick), 6:14. Spartans 17–14. Drive: 1 play, 75 yards, 0:11.
- UNLV – Tyleek Collins 4-yard pass form Max Gilliam (Evan Pantels Kick), 1:36. Rebels 21–17. Drive: 10 plays, 80 yards, 2:28.
- SJSU – Tre Walker 37-yard pass from Josh Love (Bryce Crawford Kick), 0:34. Spartans 24–21. Drive: 7 plays, 74 yards, 0:57.

Third Quarter

- SJSU – Brett Foley 1-yard pass from Josh Love (Bryce Crawford Kick), 10:48. Spartans 31–21. Drive: 12 plays, 75 yards, 4:12.
- SJSU – Tre Hartley 9-yard pass from Josh Love (Bryce Crawford Kick), 4:17. Spartans 38–21. Drive: 8 plays, 59 yards, 2:56.
- UNLV – Tyleek Collins 46-yard pass from Max Gilliam (Evan Pantels Kick), 2:01. Spartans 38–28. Drive: 6 plays, 78 yards, 2:12.
- SJSU – Bryce Crawford 36-yard field goal, 0:15. Spartans 41–28. Drive: 5 plays, 23 yards, 1:46.

Fourth Quarter

- SJSU – Dakari Monroe 50-yard interception return, 13:44. Spartans 47–28. Drive: 5 plays, 19 yards, 1:27.
- UNLV – Evan Pantels 23-yard field goal, 10:46. Spartans 47–31. Drive: 13 plays, 70 yards, 2:58.
- SJSU – Bryce Crawford 45-yard field goal, 7:11. Spartans 50–31. Drive: 4 plays, −2 yards, 2:12.
- UNLV – Tyleek Collins 4-yard pass from Max Gilliam, 2:28. Spartans 50–37. Drive: 15 plays, 75 yards, 4:43.

Passing

- UNLV – Max Gilliam – 28/50, 387 yards, 4 TD, 3 INT
- SJSU – Josh Love – 25/36, 335 yards, 4 TD, 1 INT

Rushing

- UNLV – Lexington Thomas – 19 rushes, 61 yards
- SJSU – Tyler Nevens – 22 rushes, 103 yards, 1 TD

Receiving

- UNLV – Tyleek Collins – 9 receptions, 170 yards, 4 TD
- SJSU – Tre Walker – 5 receptions, 104 yards, 1 TD

=== At Wyoming ===
San Jose State Spartans at Wyoming Cowboys

Quarter	1	2	3	4	Total
Spartans	0	0	3	6	9
Cowboys	3	7	7	7	24

at War Memorial Stadium, Laramie, Wyoming

- Date: November 3, 2018
- Game time: 12:05 p.m. MDT
- Game weather: Cloudy, 34 °F (1 °C)
- Game attendance: 13,238
- Referee: Michael VanderVelde
- TV announcers (AT&TSN): Drew Goodman, Sherdrick Bonner, and Brad Thompson
- Evans, Chambers lead Wyoming in snowy 24–9 win, Game Book

Game information

First Quarter

- WYO – Cooper Rothe 26-yard field goal, 10:36. Cowboys 3–0. Drive: 9 plays, 66 yards, 4:24.

Second Quarter

- WYO – Nico Evans 58-yard run (Cooper Rothe Kick), 14:50. Cowboys 10–0. Drive: 5 plays, 71 yards, 1:45.

Third Quarter

- SJSU – Bryce Crawford 26-yard field goal, 11:09. Cowboys 10–3. Drive: 9 plays, 66 yards, 3:51.
- WYO – Sean Chambers 64-yard run (Cooper Rothe Kick), 8:41. Cowboys 17–3. Drive: 5 plays, 75 yards, 2:28.

Fourth Quarter

- SJSU – Tre Walker 17-yard pass from Josh Love, 8:48. Cowboys 17–9. Drive: 5 plays, 38 yards, 1:26.
- WYO – Austin Fort 20-yard pass from Sean Chambers (Cooper Rothe Kick), 1:09. Cowboys 24–9. Drive: 14 plays, 75 yards, 7:39.

Passing

- SJSU – Josh Love – 19/32, 173 yards, 1 TD
- WYO – Sean Chambers – 4/8, 51 yards, 1 TD

Rushing

- SJSU – Tyler Nevens – 17 rushes, 70 yards
- WYO – Nico Evans – 33 rushes, 187 yards, 1 TD

Receiving

- SJSU – Josh Oliver – 5 receptions, 66 yards
- WYO – Austin Fort – 2 receptions, 28 yards, 1 TD

=== At Utah State ===
San Jose State Spartans at No. 14 Utah State Aggies

Quarter	1	2	3	4	Total
Spartans	7	3	7	7	24
No. 14 Aggies	10	28	21	3	62

at Maverik Stadium, Logan, Utah

- Date: November 10, 2018
- Game time: 2:00 p.m. MST
- Game weather: Clear, 46 °F (8 °C)
- Game attendance: 19,017
- Referee: Cal McNeill
- TV announcers (Facebook): Ari Wolfe, Max Starks, and Dani Klupenger
- No. 14 Utah State beats SJSU 62–24 for 9th straight win, Game Book

Game information

First Quarter

- SJSU – Tre Jenkins 41-yard return of blocked punt (Bryce Crawford Kick), 11:09. Spartans 7–0. Drive: 3 plays, 8 yards, 2:08.
- USU – Jordan Nathan 42-yard pass from Jordan Love (Dominik Eberle Kick), 8:45. Tie 7–7. Drive: 7 plays, 68 yards, 2:16.
- USU – Dominik Eberle 26-yard field goal, 5:24. Aggies 10–7. Drive: 10 plays, 55 yards, 2:17.

Second Quarter

- SJSU – Bryce Crawford 28-yard field goal, 13:53. Tie 10–10. Drive: 7 plays, 48 yards, 1:28.
- USU – Gerold Bright 24-yard pass from Jordan Love (Dominik Eberle Kick), 10:22. Aggies 17–10. Drive: 10 plays, 75 yards, 3:31.
- USU – Jordan Love 1-yard run (Dominik Eberle Kick), 7:29. Aggies 24–10. Drive: 4 plays, 66 yards, 1:04.
- USU – Gerold Bright 29-yard run (Dominik Eberle Kick), 5:20. Aggies 31–10. Drive: 1 play, 29 yards, 0:11.
- USU – Darwin Thompson 7-yard pass from Jordan Love (Domink Eberle Kick), 1:15. Aggies 38–10. Drive: 12 plays, 87 yards, 2:50.

Third Quarter

- USU – Darwin Thompson 59-yard run (Dominik Eberle Kick), 14:29. Aggies 45–10. Drive: 2 plays, 65 yards, 0:23.
- SJSU – Tre Walker 35-yard pass from Josh Love (Bryce Crawford Kick), 10:12. Aggies 45–17. Drive: 1 play, 35 yards, 0:08.
- USU – Jalen Greene 37-yard pass from Jordan Love (Dominik Eberle Kick), 7:09. Aggies 52–17. Drive: 7 plays, 75 yards, 2:57.
- USU – Darwin Thompson 88-yard pass from Jordan Love (Dominik Eberle Kick), 4:33. Aggies 59–17. Drive: 2 plays, 80 yards, 0:53.

Fourth Quarter

- USU – Dominik Eberle 24-yard field goal, 8:37. Aggies 62–17. Drive: 9 plays, 76 yards, 4:55.
- SJSU – Tre Walker 75-yard pass from Michael Carrillo (Bryce Crawford Kick), 8:26. Aggies 62–24. Drive: 1 play, 75 yards, 0:11.

Passing

- SJSU – Josh Love – 18/36, 210 yards, 1 TD, 1 INT
- USU – Jordan Love – 32/42, 491 yards, 5 TD

Rushing

- SJSU – Tyler Nevens – 10 rushes, 58 yards
- USU – Darwin Thompson – 15 rushes, 140 yards, 1 TD

Receiving

- SJSU – Tre Walker – 7 receptions, 209 yards, 2 TD
- USU – Darwin Thompson – 4 receptions, 115 yards, 2 TD

=== Nevada ===
Nevada Wolf Pack at San Jose State Spartans

Quarter	1	2	3	4	Total
Wolf Pack	0	7	7	7	21
Spartans	6	0	6	0	12

at CEFCU Stadium, San Jose, California

- Date: November 17, 2018
- Game time: 12:06 p.m. PST
- Game weather: Cloudy, 56 °F (13 °C)
- Game attendance: 12,271
- Referee: Reggie Smith
- TV announcers (ESPN3): Trey Bender and Al Groh
- Taua scores lone 4th quarter TD, Nevada beat SJSU 21–12, Game Book

Game information

First Quarter

- SJSU – Josh Oliver 1-yard pass from Michael Carrillo, 0:52. Spartans 6–0. Drive: 1 play, 1 yard, 0:04.

Second Quarter

- NEV – Ty Gangi 2-yard run (Spencer Pettit Kick), 1:48. Wolf Pack 7–6. Drive: 13 plays, 85 yards, 6:37.

Third Quarter

- NEV – Brendan O'Leary 9-yard pass from Ty Gangi (Spencer Pettit Kick), 12:21. Wolf Pack 14–6. Drive: 6 plays, 75 yards, 2:39.
- SJSU – DeJon Packer 22-yard pass from Michael Carrillo, 3:24. Wolf Pack 14–12. Drive: 7 plays, 43 yards, 3:17.

Fourth Quarter

- NEV – Toa Taua 9-yard run (Spencer Pettit Kick), 12:38. Wolf Pack 21–12. Drive: 7 plays, 85 yards, 3:26.

Passing

- NEV – Ty Gangi – 19/32, 314 yards, 1 TD, 1 INT
- SJSU – Michael Carrillo – 17/26, 168 yards, 2 TD, 1 INT

Rushing

- NEV – Toa Taua – 29 rushes, 121 yards, 1 TD
- SJSU – Tyler Nevens – 9 rushes, 18 yards

Receiving

- NEV – Romeo Doubs – 5 receptions, 105 yards
- SJSU – Tre Walker – 4 receptions, 69 yards

=== At Fresno State ===
Battle for the Valley Trophy: San Jose State Spartans at Fresno State Bulldogs

Quarter	1	2	3	4	Total
Spartans	0	0	0	13	13
Bulldogs	0	3	14	14	31

at Bulldog Stadium, Fresno, California

- Date: November 24, 2018
- Game time: 4:02 p.m. PST
- Game weather: Cloudy, 65 °F (18 °C)
- Game attendance: 26,162
- Referee: Kevin Boltmann
- TV announcers (ESPNU): Jay Alter and Ray Bentley
- Johnson, Fresno State beat San Jose State 31–13, Game Book

Game information

First Quarter
Second Quarter

- FRES – Asa Fuller 32-yard field goal, 0:03. Bulldogs 3–0. Drive: 13 plays, 54 yards, 4:04.

Third Quarter

- FRES – Jordan Mims 1-yard run (Asa Fuller Kick), 5:30. Bulldogs 10–0. Drive: 5 plays, 77 yards, 1:49.
- FRES – KeeSean Johnson 31-yard pass from Marcus McMaryion (Asa Fuller Kick), 0:32. Bulldogs 17–0. Drive: 5 plays, 80 yards, 2:11.

Fourth Quarter

- SJSU – Malike Roberson 73-yard pass from Michael Carrillo (Bryce Crawford Kick), 14:47. Bulldogs 17–7. Drive: 3 plays, 75 yards, 0:45.
- FRES – Ronnie Rivers 18-yard pass from Marcus McMaryion (Asa Fuller Kick), 11:59. Bulldogs 24–7. Drive: 6 plays, 78 yards, 2:39.
- FRES – Arron Mosby 95-yard interception return (Asa Fuller Kick), 4:08. Bulldogs 31–7. Drive: 4 plays, 66 yards, 1:21.
- SJSU – Tre Walker 4-yard pass from Michael Carrillo, 1:24. Bulldogs 31–13. Drive: 6 plays, 47 yards, 2:34.

Passing

- SJSU – Michael Carrillo – 24/41, 302 yards, 2 TD, 1 INT
- FRES – Marcus McMaryion – 20/29, 317 yards, 2 TD

Rushing

- SJSU – Tyler Nevens – 9 rushes, 50 yards
- FRES – Ronnie Rivers – 17 rushes, 92 yards

Receiving

- SJSU – Tre Walker – 11 receptions, 116 yards, 1 TD
- FRES – KeeSean Johnson – 7 receptions, 173 yards, 1 TD

== Honors ==
=== Mountain West ===
Team	Player	Position	Year
First	Josh Oliver	TE	SR
First	Dakari Monroe	DB	SR
Second	Bryson Bridges	DL	SR
Honorable	Ethan Aguayo	LB	JR
Honorable	Thai Cottrell	RS	SR
Honorable	Bryce Crawford	P	SR
Honorable	Boogie Roberts	DL	SR

== Players drafted into the NFL ==
Round	Pick	Player	Position	NFL Club
3	69	Josh Oliver	TE	Jacksonville Jaguars
