= 2018 UNLV Rebels football team =

American college football season

2018 UNLV Rebels football
- Conference: Mountain West Conference
- West Division
- Record: 4–8 (2–6 MW)
- Head coach: Tony Sanchez (4th season)
- Offensive coordinator: Barney Cotton (4th season)
- Offensive scheme: Multiple
- Defensive coordinator: Tim Skipper (1st season)
- Base defense: 3–4
- Home stadium: Sam Boyd Stadium

2018 Mountain West Conference football standings
	Conf.			Overall
Team	W		L	W		L
Mountain Division
No. 23 Boise State x	7	–	1	10	–	3
No. 22 Utah State	7	–	1	11	–	2
Wyoming	4	–	4	6	–	6
Air Force	3	–	5	5	–	7
Colorado State	2	–	6	3	–	9
New Mexico	1	–	7	3	–	9
West Division
No. 18 Fresno State x$	7	–	1	12	–	2
Nevada	5	–	3	8	–	5
Hawaii	5	–	3	8	–	6
San Diego State	4	–	4	7	–	6
UNLV	2	–	6	4	–	8
San Jose State	1	–	7	1	–	11
Championship: Fresno State 19, Boise State 16 (OT)
$ – Conference champion; x – Division champion/co-champions; y – Championship game participant; Rankings from AP Poll

The 2018 UNLV Rebels football team represented the University of Nevada, Las Vegas (UNLV) as a member of the Mountain West Conference (MW) during the 2018 NCAA Division I FBS football season. Led by fourth-year head coach Tony Sanchez, the Rebels compiled an overall record of 4–8 record with mark of 2–6 in conference play, placing fifth in the MW's West Division. The team played home games at Sam Boyd Stadium in Whitney, Nevada.

== Schedule ==
Date	Time	Opponent	Site	TV	Result	Attendance
September 1	1:00 p.m.	at No. 15 USC*	Los Angeles Memorial Coliseum; Los Angeles, CA	P12N	L 21–43	58,708
September 8	6:00 p.m.	UTEP*	Sam Boyd Stadium; Whitney, NV	ATTSNRM	W 52–24	14,122
September 15	7:00 pm	Prairie View A&M*	Sam Boyd Stadium; Whitney, NV	Stadium	W 46–17	14,786
September 22	4:00 p.m.	at Arkansas State*	Centennial Bank Stadium; Jonesboro, AR	ESPN3	L 20–27	18,537
October 6	1:00 p.m.	New Mexico	Sam Boyd Stadium; Whitney, NV	ATTSNRM	L 14–50	18,949
October 13	1:00 p.m.	at Utah State	Maverik Stadium; Logan, UT	Stadium on Facebook	L 28–59	21,212
October 19	7:00 p.m.	Air Force^{†}	Sam Boyd Stadium; Whitney, NV	CBSSN	L 35–41	17,881
October 27	3:30 p.m.	at San Jose State	CEFCU Stadium; San Jose, CA	ATTSNRM	L 37–50	16,165
November 3	7:30 p.m.	No. 20 Fresno State	Sam Boyd Stadium; Whitney, NV	CBSSN	L 3–48	15,276
November 10	7:30 p.m.	at San Diego State	SDCCU Stadium; San Diego, CA	ESPN2	W 27–24	24,986
November 17	8:00 p.m.	at Hawaii	Aloha Stadium; Halawa, HI	Stadium, SPEC HI	L 28–35	25,697
November 24	6:30 p.m.	Nevada	Sam Boyd Stadium; Whitney, NV (Fremont Cannon)	CBSSN	W 34–29	19,921
*Non-conference game; ^{†}Homecoming; Rankings from AP Poll released prior to the game; All times are in Pacific time

== Preseason ==
=== Award watch lists ===
Listed in the order that they were released

Award	Player	Position	Year
Maxwell Award	Armani Rogers	QB	SO
Doak Walker Award	Lexington Thomas	RB	SR
Lou Groza Award	Evan Pantels	K	SR
Wuerffel Trophy	Darren Wood Jr.	WR	JR
Earl Campbell Tyler Rose Award	Lexington Thomas	RB	SR

=== Mountain West media days ===
During the Mountain West media days held July 24–25 at the Cosmopolitan on the Las Vegas Strip, the Rebels were predicted to finish in third place in the West Division.

==== Preseason All-Mountain West Team ====
The Rebels had one player selected to the preseason All-Mountain West team.

Offense

Lexington Thomas – RB

== Game summaries ==
=== At USC ===
UNLV at USC

Team	1	2	3	4	Total
Rebels	7	7	0	7	21
• No. 15 Trojans	6	13	0	24	43

- Date: September 1, 2018
- Location: Los Angeles Memorial Coliseum
  Los Angeles, CA
- Game start: 1:07 p.m. PDT
- Elapsed time: 3 hours and 17 minutes
- Game attendance: 58,708
- Game weather: Temperature: 80 °F (27 °C) • Weather: Clear Skies • Wind: Calm
- Referee: Kevin Mar
- TV announcers (P12N): Ted Robinson, Yogi Roth and Jill Savage (sideline)

Scoring summary
1	14:07	USC	Chase McGrath 46–yard field goal	USC 3–0
1	03:18	USC	Chase McGrath 38–yard field goal	USC 6–0
1	02:37	UNLV	Lexington Thomas 71–yard run (Evan Pantels kick)	UNLV 7–6
2	13:12	USC	Chase McGrath 29–yard field goal	USC 9–7
2	10:32	UNLV	Kendal Keys 31–yard pass from Armani Rogers (Evan Pantels kick)	UNLV 14–9
2	09:19	USC	Chase McGrath 47–yard field goal	UNLV 14–12
2	01:04	USC	Vavae Malepeai 2–yard run (Chase McGrath kick)	USC 19–14
4	14:52	USC	Amon-Ra St. Brown 43–yard pass from J. T. Daniels (Chase McGrath kick)	USC 26–14
4	12:39	USC	Aca'Cedric Ware 15–yard run (Chase McGrath kick)	USC 33–14
4	08:06	UNLV	Giovanni Fauolo Sr. 5–yard pass from Armani Rogers (Evan Pantels kick)	USC 33–21
4	04:39	USC	Chase McGrath 36–yard field goal	USC 36–21
4	01:38	USC	Vavae Malepeai 20–yard run (Chase McGrath kick)	USC 43–21

=== UTEP ===
UTEP at UNLV

Team	1	2	3	4	Total
Miners	10	0	7	7	24
• Rebels	14	24	7	7	52

- Date: September 8, 2018
- Location: Sam Boyd Stadium
  Whitney, NV
- Game start: 6:08 p.m. PDT
- Elapsed time: 3 hours
- Game attendance: 14,122
- Game weather: Temperature: 106 °F (41 °C) • Weather: Clear • Wind: SW 14 MPH
- Referee: Stephen Baron
- TV announcers (ATTSNRM): Ari Wolfe and Sherdrick Bonner

Scoring summary
1	12:42	UNLV	Mekhi Stevenson 51–yard pass from Armani Rogers (Evan Pantels kick)	UNLV 7–0
1	07:58	UTEP	Kai Locksley 1–yard run (Jason Filley kick)	TIE 7–7
1	04:55	UNLV	Tyleek Collins 5–yard run (Evan Pantels kick)	UNLV 14–7
1	03:02	UTEP	Jason Filley 33–yard field goal	UNLV 14–10
2	14:52	UNLV	Armani Rogers 28–yard run (Evan Pantels kick)	UNLV 21–10
2	08:23	UNLV	Lexington Thomas 40–yard run (Evan Pantels kick)	UNLV 28–10
2	03:38	UNLV	Evan Pantels 35–yard field goal	UNLV 31–10
2	00:22	UNLV	Darren Woods Jr. 22–yard pass from Armani Rogers (Evan Pantels kick)	UNLV 38–10
3	14:35	UNLV	Lexington Thomas 4–yard run (Evan Pantels kick)	UNLV 45–10
3	03:49	UTEP	Kai Locksley 20–yard run (Jason Filley kick)	UNLV 45–17
4	12:43	UNLV	Tyleek Collins 3–yard pass from Armani Rogers (Evan Pantels kick)	UNLV 52–17
4	08:26	UTEP	Quardraiz Wadley 22–yard run (Jason Filley kick)	UNLV 52–24

=== Prairie View A&M ===
Prairie View A&M at UNLV

Team	1	2	3	4	Total
Panthers	0	0	14	3	17
• Rebels	20	14	0	12	46

- Date: September 15, 2018
- Location: Sam Boyd Stadium
  Whitney, NV
- Game start: 7:06 p.m. PDT
- Elapsed time: 3 hours and 27 minutes
- Game attendance: 14,786
- Game weather: Temperature: 100 °F (38 °C) • Weather: Clear and Windy • Wind: SSW 15 MPH
- Referee: Dwayne Johnson
- TV announcers (Stadium): Tony Cordasco and Joe Haro

Scoring summary
1	09:23	UNLV	Drew Tejchman 24–yard pass from Armani Rogers (Evan Pantels kick failed)	UNLV 6–0
1	08:01	UNLV	Lexington Thomas 1–yard run (Evan Pantels kick)	UNLV 13–0
1	01:29	UNLV	Armani Rogers 6–yard run (Evan Pantels kick)	UNLV 20–0
2	08:12	UNLV	Armani Rogers 2–yard run (Evan Pantels kick)	UNLV 27–0
2	00:51	UNLV	Armani Rogers 2–yard run (Evan Pantels kick)	UNLV 34–0
3	05:38	PVAM	Tristen Wallace 4–yard pass from Jalen Morton (Zach Elder kick)	UNLV 34–7
3	01:44	PVAM	Zarrian Holcombe 13–yard pass from Jalen Morton (Zach Elder kick)	UNLV 34–14
4	08:28	PVAM	Zach Elder 28–yard field goal	UNLV 34–17
4	05:04	UNLV	Evan Pantels 32–yard field goal	UNLV 37–17
4	04:15	UNLV	Armani Rogers 8–yard run (Evan Pantels kick)	UNLV 44–17
4	00:37	UNLV	Team 17–yard safety	UNLV 46–17

=== At Arkansas State ===
UNLV at Arkansas State

Team	1	2	3	4	Total
Rebels	7	0	13	0	20
• Red Wolves	6	7	6	8	27

- Date: September 22, 2018
- Location: Centennial Bank Stadium
  Jonesboro, AR
- Game start: 6:05 p.m. CDT
- Elapsed time: 3 hours and 11 minutes
- Game attendance: 18,537
- Game weather: Temperature: 65 °F (18 °C) • Weather: Overcast and Rain • Wind: NE 9 MPH
- Referee: Scott Campbell
- TV announcers (ESPN3): Roger Twibell, Pete Cordelli and Rich Zvosec (sideline)

Scoring summary
1	12:37	ASU	Justin McInnis 16–yard pass from Justice Hansen (Blake Grupe rush fumbled)	ASU 6–0
1	03:08	UNLV	Evan Owens 41–yard run (Evan Pantels kick)	UNLV 7–6
2	06:59	ASU	Jonathan Adams Jr. 24–yard pass from Justice Hansen (Blake Grupe kick)	ASU 13–7
3	11:08	ASU	Javonis Isaac 2–yard pass from Justice Hansen (pass failed)	ASU 19–7
3	04:11	UNLV	Armani Rogers 1–yard run (Evan Pantels kick)	ASU 19–14
3	01:38	UNLV	Lexington Thomas 10–yard run (Armani Rogers pass failed)	UNLV 20–19
4	13:19	ASU	Marcel Murray 39–yard run (rush)	ASU 27–20

=== New Mexico ===
New Mexico at UNLV

Team	1	2	3	4	Total
• Lobos	0	29	7	14	50
Rebels	0	0	0	14	14

- Date: October 6, 2018
- Location: Sam Boyd Stadium
  Whitney, NV
- Game start: 1:08 p.m. PDT
- Elapsed time: 2 hours and 51 minutes
- Game attendance: 18,949
- Game weather: Temperature: 77 °F (25 °C) • Weather: Cloudy • Wind: N 8 MPH
- Referee: Michael VanderVelde
- TV announcers (ATTSNRM): Drew Goodman, Sherdrick Bonner and Brad Thompson (sideline)

Scoring summary
2	14:57	NM	Zahneer Shuler 1–yard run (Andrew Shelley kick blocked)	NM 6–0
2	09:34	NM	Tyrone Owens 1–yard run (Andrew Shelley kick failed)	NM 12–0
2	04:37	NM	Andrew Shelley 43–yard field goal	NM 15–0
2	02:56	NM	Elijah Lilly 74–yard pass from Sheriron Jones (Andrew Shelley kick)	NM 22–0
2	00:17	NM	Anselem Umeh 26–yard pass from Sheriron Jones (Andrew Shelley kick)	NM 29–0
3	02:25	NM	Emmanuel Harris 33–yard pass from Sheriron Jones (Andrew Shelley kick)	NM 36–0
4	14:46	UNLV	Brandon Presley 19–yard pass from Max Gilliam (Evan Pantels kick)	NM 36–7
4	11:07	NM	Delane Hart-Johnson 11–yard pass from Sheriron Jones (Andrew Shelley kick)	NM 43–7
4	07:57	NM	Zahneer Shuler 2–yard run (Andrew Shelley kick)	NM 50–7
4	04:43	UNLV	Darren Woods Jr. 11–yard pass from Max Gilliam (Evan Pantels kick)	NM 50–14

=== At Utah State ===
UNLV at Utah State

Team	1	2	3	4	Total
Rebels	7	0	7	14	28
• Aggies	14	28	7	10	59

- Date: October 13, 2018
- Location: Maverik Stadium
  Logan, UT
- Game start: 2:00 p.m. MDT
- Elapsed time: 3 hours and 20 minutes
- Game attendance: 21,212
- Game weather: Temperature: 57 °F (14 °C) • Weather: Cloudy • Wind: W 14 MPH
- Referee: Eddy Shelton
- TV announcers (Stadium on Facebook): Ari Wolfe, Bruce Gradkowski and Dani Klupenger (sideline)

Scoring summary
1	05:38	UNLV	Lexington Thomas 1–yard run (Evan Pantels kick)	UNLV 7–0
1	03:17	USU	Jordan Nathan 24–yard pass from Jordan Love (Dominik Eberle kick)	TIE 7–7
1	00:22	USU	Jalen Greene 80–yard pass from Jordan Love (Dominik Eberle kick)	USU 14–7
2	13:48	USU	Savon Scarver 26–yard pass from Jordan Love (Dominik Eberle kick)	USU 21–7
2	11:35	USU	Baron Gajkowski 16–yard blocked punt return (Dominik Eberle kick)	USU 28–7
2	09:27	USU	Darwin Thompson 7–yard run (Dominik Eberle kick)	USU 35–7
2	00:18	USU	Ron'quavion Tarver 7–yard pass from Jordan Love (Dominik Eberle kick)	USU 42–7
3	07:00	UNLV	Darren Woods Jr. 25–yard pass from Max Gilliam (Evan Pantels kick)	USU 42–14
3	05:11	USU	Ron'quavion Tarver 29–yard pass from Jordan Love (Dominik Eberle kick)	USU 49–14
4	10:25	UNLV	Drew Tejchman 10–yard pass from Max Gilliam (Evan Pantels kick)	USU 49–21
4	03:15	USU	Dominik Eberle 24–yard field goal	USU 52–21
4	02:58	UNLV	Tyleek Collins 79–yard pass from Max Gilliam (Evan Pantels kick)	USU 52–28
4	01:55	USU	Henry Colombi 37–yard run (Dominik Eberle kick)	USU 59–28

=== Air Force ===
Air Force at UNLV

Team	1	2	3	4	Total
• Falcons	3	17	21	0	41
Rebels	7	14	7	7	35

- Date: October 19, 2018
- Location: Sam Boyd Stadium
  Whitney, NV
- Game start: 7:02 p.m. PDT
- Elapsed time: 3 hours and 17 minutes
- Game attendance: 17,881
- Game weather: Temperature: 78 °F (26 °C) • Weather: Clear Skies • Wind: NNE 15 MPH
- Referee: David Alvarez
- TV announcers (CBSSN): Dave Ryan and Corey Chavous

Scoring summary
1	07:16	AF	Jake Koehnke 32–yard field goal	AF 3–0
1	02:16	UNLV	Darren Woods Jr. 10–yard pass from Max Gilliam (Evan Pantels kick)	UNLV 7–3
2	13:01	AF	Jake Koehnke 26–yard field goal	UNLV 7–6
2	12:23	UNLV	Lexington Thomas 74–yard run (Evan Pantels kick)	UNLV 14–6
2	08:46	AF	Isaiah Sanders 6–yard run (Jake Koehnke kick)	UNLV 14–13
2	03:53	UNLV	Darren Woods Jr. 13–yard pass from Max Gilliam (Evan Pantels kick)	UNLV 21–13
2	00:36	AF	Isaiah Sanders 3–yard run (Jake Koehnke kick)	UNLV 21–20
3	11:00	AF	Isaiah Sanders 8–yard run (Jake Koehnke kick)	AF 27–21
3	08:26	AF	Ronald Cleveland 69–yard pass from Isaiah Sanders (Jake Koehnke kick)	AF 34–21
3	05:45	AF	Cole Fagan 49–yard run (Jake Koehnke kick)	AF 41–21
3	00:40	UNLV	Lexington Thomas 2–yard run (Evan Pantels kick)	AF 41–28
4	07:34	UNLV	Brandon Presley 10–yard pass from Max Gilliam (Evan Pantels kick)	AF 41–35

=== At San Jose State ===
UNLV at San Jose State

Team	1	2	3	4	Total
Rebels	7	14	7	9	37
• Spartans	7	17	17	9	50

- Date: October 27, 2018
- Location: CEFCU Stadium
  San Jose, CA
- Game start: 3:38 p.m. PDT
- Elapsed time: 3 hours and 16 minutes
- Game attendance: 16,165
- Game weather: Temperature: 74 °F (23 °C) • Weather: Clear • Wind: NW 12 MPH
- Referee: Stephen Baron
- TV announcers (ATTSNRM): Drew Goodman, Sherdrick Bonner and Brad Thompson (sideline)

Scoring summary
1	07:39	UNLV	Max Gilliam 6–yard run (Evan Pantels kick)	UNLV 7–0
1	06:16	SJSU	Tyler Nevens 4–yard run (Bryce Crawford kick)	TIE 7–7
2	12:28	SJSU	Josh Oliver 2–yard pass from Josh Love (Bryce Crawford kick)	SJSU 14–7
2	06:25	SJSU	Bryce Crawford 50–yard field goal	SJSU 17–7
2	06:14	UNLV	Tyleek Collins 75–yard pass from Max Gilliam (Evan Pantels kick)	SJSU 17–14
2	01:36	UNLV	Tyleek Collins 4–yard pass from Max Gilliam (Evan Pantels kick)	UNLV 21–17
2	00:34	SJSU	Tre Walker 37–yard pass from Josh Love (Bryce Crawford kick)	SJSU 24–21
3	10:48	SJSU	Brett Foley 1–yard pass from Josh Love (Bryce Crawford kick)	SJSU 31–21
3	04:17	SJSU	Tre Hartley 9–yard pass from Josh Love (Bryce Crawford kick)	SJSU 38–21
3	02:01	UNLV	Tyleek Collins 46–yard pass from Max Gilliam (Evan Pantels kick)	SJSU 38–28
3	00:15	SJSU	Bryce Crawford 36–yard field goal	SJSU 41–28
4	13:44	SJSU	Dakari Monroe 50–yard interception (Bryce Crawford kick failed)	SJSU 47–28
4	10:46	UNLV	Evan Pantels 23–yard field goal	SJSU 47–31
4	07:11	SJSU	Bryce Crawford 45–yard field goal	SJSU 50–31
4	02:28	UNLV	Tyleek Collins 4–yard pass from Max Gilliam (pass failed)	SJSU 50–37

=== Fresno State ===
Fresno State at UNLV

Team	1	2	3	4	Total
• No. 20 Bulldogs	7	10	17	14	48
Rebels	0	0	0	3	3

- Date: November 3, 2018
- Location: Sam Boyd Stadium
  Whitney, NV
- Game start: 7:32 p.m. PDT
- Elapsed time: 3 hours and 26 minutes
- Game attendance: 15,276
- Game weather: Temperature: 69 °F (21 °C) • Weather: Partly Cloudy • Wind: NE 5 MPH
- Referee: Kevin Hassell
- TV announcers (CBSSN): Rich Waltz, Aaron Murray and Cassie McKinney (sideline)

Scoring summary
1	10:39	FS	Jamire Jordan 12–yard pass from Marcus McMaryion (Asa Fuller kick)	FS 7–0
2	14:55	FS	Ronnie Rivers 2–yard run (Asa Fuller kick)	FS 14–0
2	00:36	FS	Asa Fuller 35–yard field goal	FS 17–0
3	10:45	FS	Kyle Riddering 9–yard pass from Marcus McMaryion (Asa Fuller kick)	FS 24–0
3	08:22	FS	Josh Hokit 5–yard run (Asa Fuller kick)	FS 31–0
3	04:42	FS	Asa Fuller 47–yard field goal	FS 34–0
4	14:54	FS	Derrion Grim 10–yard run (Asa Fuller kick)	FS 41–0
4	10:13	UNLV	Evan Pantels 28–yard field goal	FS 41–3
4	08:14	FS	Saevion Johnson 2–yard run (Asa Fuller kick)	FS 48–3

=== At San Diego State ===
UNLV at San Diego State

Team	1	2	3	4	Total
• Rebels	6	7	0	14	27
Aztecs	0	14	10	0	24

- Date: November 10, 2018
- Location: SDCCU Stadium
  San Diego, CA
- Game start: 7:36 p.m. PST
- Elapsed time: 3 hours and 20 minutes
- Game attendance: 24,986
- Game weather: Temperature: 61 °F (16 °C) • Weather: Clear • Wind: SW 3 MPH
- Referee: Michael VanderVelde
- TV announcers (ESPN2): Mark Neely, Ray Bentley and Alex Corddry (sideline)

Scoring summary
1	11:30	UNLV	Evan Pantels 21–yard field goal	UNLV 3–0
1	07:08	UNLV	Evan Pantels 45–yard field goal	UNLV 6–0
2	13:54	SDSU	Tim Wilson Jr. 13–yard pass from Christian Chapman (John Baron II kick)	SDSU 7–6
2	10:35	UNLV	Lexington Thomas 2–yard run (Evan Pantels kick)	UNLV 13–7
2	00:28	SDSU	Juwan Washington 2–yard run (John Baron II kick)	SDSU 14–13
3	04:51	SDSU	John Baron II 33–yard field goal	SDSU 17–13
3	00:00	SDSU	Tim Wilson Jr. 34–yard pass from Ryan Agnew (John Baron II kick)	SDSU 24–13
4	09:19	UNLV	Brandon Presley 10–yard pass from Max Gilliam (pass failed)	SDSU 24–19
4	03:27	UNLV	Lexington Thomas 75–yard run (Brandon Presley pass)	UNLV 27–24

=== At Hawaii ===
UNLV at Hawaii

Team	1	2	3	4	Total
Rebels	7	14	0	7	28
• Rainbow Warriors	3	3	7	22	35

- Date: November 17, 2018
- Location: Aloha Stadium
  Halawa, HI
- Game start: 6:07 p.m.
- Elapsed time: 3 hours and 17 minutes
- Game attendance: 25,697
- Game weather: Temperature: 74 °F (23 °C) • Weather: Cloudy and 74% Humidity • Wind: NNE 13 MPH
- Referee: Brad Van Vark
- TV announcers (Stadium/SPEC HI): Robert Kekaula, Rich Miano and Scott Robbs (sideline)

Scoring summary
1	08:04	UH	Ryan Meskell 36–yard field goal	UH 3–0
1	00:18	UNLV	Noah Bean 9–yard pass from Max Gilliam (Evan Pantels kick)	UNLV 7–3
2	07:29	UNLV	Lexington Thomas 12–yard run (Evan Pantels kick)	UNLV 14–3
2	02:22	UNLV	Lexington Thomas 45–yard run (Evan Pantels kick)	UNLV 21–3
2	00:06	UH	Ryan Meskell 41–yard field goal	UNLV 21–6
3	04:46	UH	Cole McDonald 3–yard run (Ryan Meskell kick)	UNLV 21–13
4	14:21	UNLV	Evan Owens 16–yard pass from Armani Rogers (Evan Pantels kick)	UNLV 28–13
4	11:42	UH	JoJo Ward 64–yard pass from Chevan Cordeiro (John Ursua pass)	UNLV 28–21
4	04:23	UH	JoJo Ward 20–yard pass from Chevan Cordeiro (Ryan Meskell kick)	TIE 28–28
4	01:25	UH	John Ursua 68–yard pass from Chevan Cordeiro (Ryan Meskell kick)	UH 35–28

=== Nevada ===
Nevada at UNLV

Team	1	2	3	4	Total
Wolf Pack	20	6	0	3	29
• Rebels	0	21	7	6	34

- Date: November 24, 2018
- Location: Sam Boyd Stadium
  Whitney, NV
- Game start: 6:32 p.m. PST
- Elapsed time: 3 hours and 23 minutes
- Game attendance: 19,921
- Game weather: Temperature: 53 °F (12 °C) • Weather: Clear • Wind: NE 3 MPH
- Referee: Cal McNeill
- TV announcers (CBSSN): Rich Waltz, Aaron Murray and A.J. Ross (sideline)

Scoring summary
1	12:03	NEV	McLane Mannix 5–yard pass from Ty Gangi (Ramiz Ahmed kick)	NEV 7–0
1	06:14	NEV	Cole Turner 24–yard pass from Ty Gangi (Ramiz Ahmed kick)	NEV 14–0
1	00:46	NEV	Kelton Moore 46–yard run (Ramiz Ahmed kick failed)	NEV 20–0
2	14:12	NEV	Ramiz Ahmed 29–yard field goal	NEV 23–0
2	12:31	UNLV	Lexington Thomas 38–yard pass from Armani Rogers (Evan Pantels kick)	NEV 23–7
2	09:47	UNLV	Giovanni Fauolo Sr. 18–yard pass from Armani Rogers (Evan Pantels kick)	NEV 23–14
2	03:34	UNLV	Armani Rogers 1–yard run (Evan Pantels kick)	NEV 23–21
2	00:36	NEV	Ramiz Ahmed 26–yard field goal	NEV 26–21
3	04:46	UNLV	Noah Bean 1–yard pass from Armani Rogers (Evan Pantels kick)	UNLV 28–26
4	11:21	NEV	Ramiz Ahmed 36–yard field goal	NEV 29–28
4	02:34	UNLV	Armani Rogers 3–yard run (rush failed)	UNLV 34–29
