= Wyngarde =

Wyngarde may refer to:

== People ==
- Peter Wyngarde (1927–2018), British actor

== Characters ==
- Mastermind (Jason Wyngarde), a Marvel comics villain (the first Marvel Comics supervillain to use the title)
- Lady Mastermind (Regan Wyngarde), one of Jason Wyngarde's daughters
- Mastermind (Martinique Jason) (born Martinique Wyngarde), one of Jason Wyngarde's daughters

== See also ==
- Wingard (disambiguation)
