= Wingard =

Wingard may refer to:

== People ==
- Adam Wingard (born 1982), American film director
- Andrew Wingard (born 1996), American football player
- Carl-Gunnar Wingård (1894–1977), Swedish actor
- Carl Fredrik af Wingård (1781–1851), Swedish politician
- Chad Wingard (born 1993), Australian Rules Football player
- Corey Wingard, Australian politician
- Edgar Wingard (1878–1927), American college football head coach
- John Wingard (1927–2021), American politician and farmer

== Other uses ==
- Wingård, a Danish-Swedish family of German origin
- Wingard, Saskatchewan, Canada

== See also ==
- Peter Wyngarde
- Wingård family
- Weingart (disambiguation)
- Weingarten (disambiguation)
- Wyngarde (disambiguation)
