= Weingart =

Weingart is a German surname. Notable people with the surname include:

- Ben Weingart (1888–1980), US real estate developer and philanthropist
- Steve Weingart (born 1966), US musician
- Peter Weingart (born 1941), German sociology professor
- Wolfgang Weingart (1941–2021), German graphic designer

== See also ==
- Weingart Stadium
- Weingarten (disambiguation)
- Wingard (disambiguation)
