= Weingartner =

Weingartner or Weingärtner is a German surname meaning "wine gardener", and may refer to:

- Felix Weingartner (1863–1942), conductor, composer and pianist
- Félix-Alphonse Weingaertner (born 1844), French musician and composer
- Hans Weingartner (born 1970), Austrian author, director and producer of films
- Hermann Weingärtner (1864–1919), German gymnast
- Marlene Weingärtner (born 1980), German professional tennis player
- Betty Weingartner (née Callish, born 1886), Dutch-born actress, singer, violinist, and fourth wife of Felix Weingartner

== See also ==
- Weingarten (disambiguation)
