= Félix-Alphonse Weingaertner =

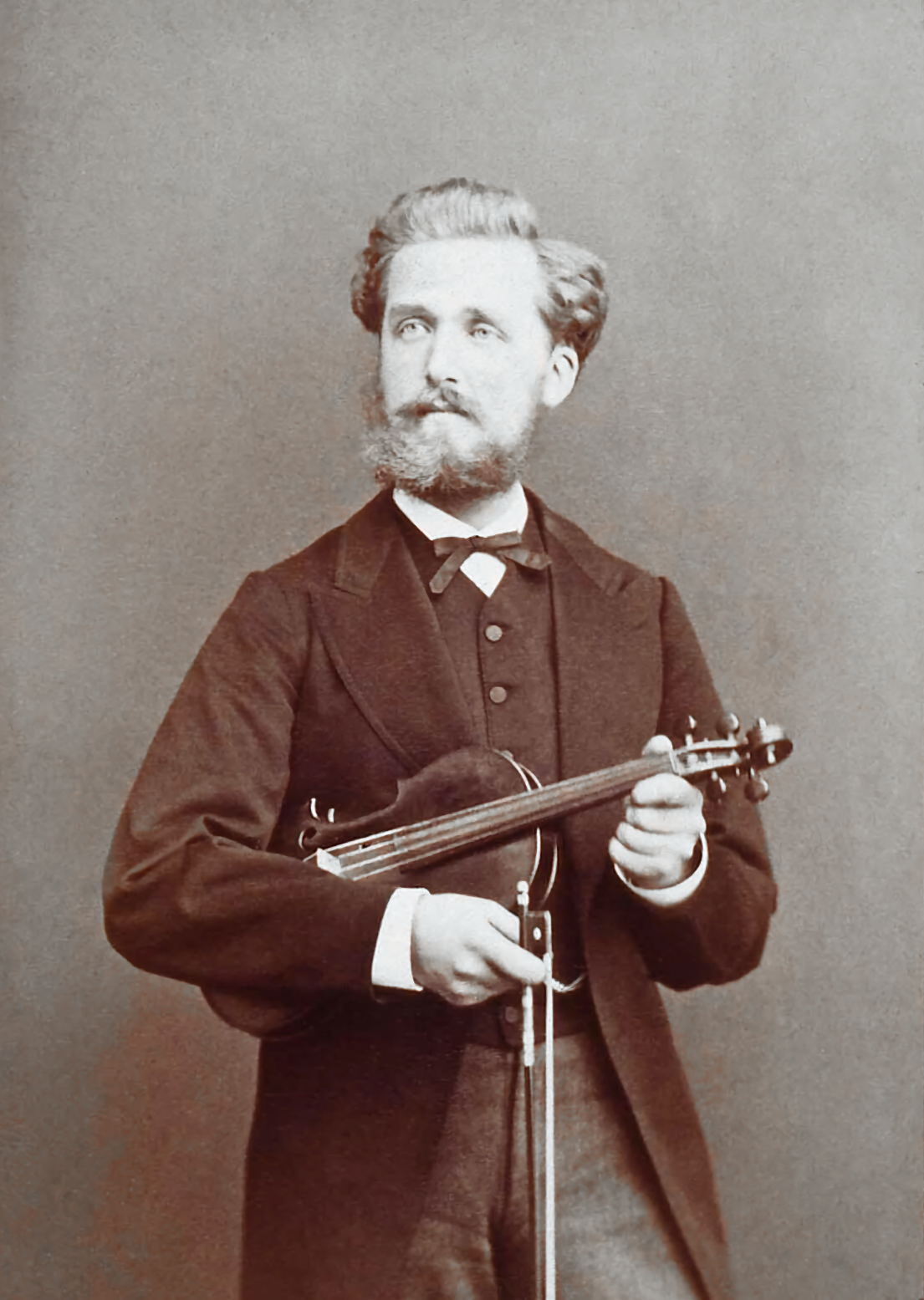
- Born: 5 May 1844; Nantes, France
- Occupation(s): Musician, composer

Félix-Alphonse Weingaertner (born 5 May 1844) was a French musician and composer.

== Biography ==
Félix-Alphonse Weingaertner was born into a Jewish family in Nantes. The son of a musician, he received his early education at home. He later entered the École des Beaux-Arts (School of Fine Arts) in Paris, where he studied under Jean-Delphin Alard and Henri Vieuxtemps. Returning to his native city, he established himself as a teacher of music, and gave several successful concerts.

In 1884, Weingaertner was appointed principal of the Conservatoire de Nantes, which position he held until 1894, when he moved to Paris. There he soon acquired a reputation as a violinist, appearing in many concerts. He travelled through France, giving concerts in major cities.
