= Weingarten (surname) =

Weingarten is a surname. Notable people with the surname include:

- Carl Weingarten, musician and photographer
- Gene Weingarten, humor writer and journalist
- Johnny Wayne (born Louis Weingarten) (1918–1990), Canadian comedian and comedy writer
- Joe Weingarten (born 1962), German politician
- Julius Weingarten (1836–1910), German mathematician
- Lawrence Weingarten (1897–1975), film director
- Mordechai Weingarten, Jewish leader in Jerusalem from 1935 to 1948
- Paul Weingarten (1886–1948), Moravia-born pianist
- Randi Weingarten (born 1957), president of the United Federation of Teachers
- Romain Weingarten (born 1926), French writer
