= Andrew Wingard =

American football player (born 1996)

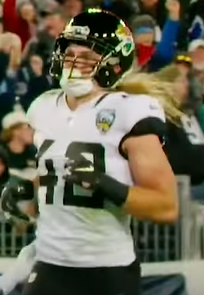
- Wingard in 2019

No. 28 – Arizona Cardinals
- Position: Free safety
- Roster status: Injured reserve

Personal information
- Born: December 5, 1996 (age 29); Lincoln, Nebraska, U.S.
- Listed height: 6 ft 0 in (1.83 m)
- Listed weight: 205 lb (93 kg)

Career information
- High school: Ralston Valley (Arvada, Colorado)
- College: Wyoming (2015–2018)
- NFL draft: 2019: undrafted

Career history
- Jacksonville Jaguars (2019–2025); Arizona Cardinals (2026–present)

Awards and highlights
- 3× First-team All-MWC (2016–2018)

Career NFL statistics as of Week 5, 2026
- Total tackles: 372
- Sacks: 2.0
- Forced fumbles: 4
- Fumble recoveries: 2
- Pass deflections: 23
- Interceptions: 7
- Stats at Pro Football Reference

Andrew Wingard (born December 5, 1996), nicknamed "Dewey", is an American professional football free safety for the Arizona Cardinals of the National Football League (NFL). He played college football for the Wyoming Cowboys. He was signed as an undrafted free agent by the Jacksonville Jaguars after the 2019 NFL draft.

== College career ==
Wingard played college football at Wyoming. Between 2015 and 2018, Wingard totaled 454 tackles, the second most in program history. He finished his college career tied for most tackles all-time in the Mountain West Conference.

== Professional career ==
Pre-draft measurables
Height	Weight	Arm length	Hand span	Wingspan	40-yard dash	10-yard split	20-yard split	20-yard shuttle	Three-cone drill	Vertical jump	Broad jump	Bench press
6 ft 0 1/8 in (1.83 m)	209 lb (95 kg)	30 1/2 in (0.77 m)	8 5/8 in (0.22 m)	6 ft 2 in (1.88 m)	4.56 s	1.57 s	2.65 s	4.20 s	6.89 s	36.5 in (0.93 m)	10 ft 1 in (3.07 m)	9 reps
All values from NFL Combine/Pro Day

=== Jacksonville Jaguars ===
==== 2019 season ====
Wingard went undrafted in the 2019 NFL draft. On April 29, 2019, the Jacksonville Jaguars signed Wingard to a three-year, $1.76 million contract that includes a signing bonus of $5,000.

On August 31, 2019, Wingard made the Jaguars final 53-man roster. In week 13 against the Tampa Bay Buccaneers, Wingard recorded a strip sack on Jameis Winston that he recovered in the 28–11 loss. This was Wingard's first career sack in the NFL.

==== 2020 season ====
Wingard was placed on the reserve/COVID-19 list by the Jaguars on August 2, 2020, and was activated from the list two days later. In Week 1 of the 2020 season against the Indianapolis Colts, Wingard recorded his first career interception off a pass thrown by Philip Rivers during the 27–20 win. He was placed on injured reserve on October 12, 2020, with an abdominal strain. He was activated on November 14, 2020. In Week 17 against the Indianapolis Colts, Wingard recorded his second career interception off a pass thrown by Philip Rivers during the 28–14 loss.

==== 2021 season ====
In the 2021 season, Wingard had one sack, 88 tackles, one interception, and one pass defended.

==== 2022 season ====
On March 15, 2022, the Jaguars placed a restricted free agent tender on Wingard. He appeared in all 17 games and started three. He recorded 37 total tackles, one interception, one pass defended, and one forced fumble.

==== 2023 season ====
On March 15, 2023, Wingard signed a three-year, $9.6 million contract extension with the Jaguars. He caught an interception against the Pittsburgh Steelers in Week 8. In the 2023 season, Wingard had 45 tackles, one interception, two passes defended, and one forced fumble.

==== 2024 season ====
On August 27, 2024, Wingard was placed on injured reserve to begin the season. He was activated on November 9.

=== Arizona Cardinals ===
On March 11, 2026, Wingard signed a one-year, $3 million contract with the Arizona Cardinals.

== NFL career statistics ==
Legend
**Bold**	Career high

=== Regular season ===
Year	Team	Games		Tackles					Interceptions						Fumbles				
Year	Team	GP	GS	Cmb	Solo	Ast	Sck	TFL	Int	Yds	Avg	Lng	TD	PD	FF	Fum	FR	Yds	TD
2019	JAX	16	2	30	22	8	**1.0**	0	0	0	0.0	0	0	0	**1**	0	0	0	0
2020	JAX	13	4	50	35	15	0.0	**3**	**2**	31	15.5	19	0	5	0	0	**1**	**17**	0
2021	JAX	15	15	**88**	**57**	31	**1.0**	2	1	23	23.0	23	0	1	0	0	0	0	0
2022	JAX	**17**	3	37	27	10	0.0	2	1	13	13.0	13	0	1	**1**	0	0	0	0
2023	JAX	**17**	2	45	35	10	0.0	1	1	0	0.0	0	0	2	**1**	0	0	0	0
2024	JAX	8	2	15	8	7	0.0	0	0	0	0.0	0	0	4	0	0	0	0	0
2025	JAX	16	**16**	84	45	**39**	0.0	**3**	1	**39**	**39.0**	**39**	0	**9**	0	0	**1**	0	0
2026	ARI	4	4	23	10	13	0.0	3	1	0	0.0	0	0	1	1	0	0	0	0
Career		106	48	372	239	133	2.0	14	7	106	17.7	39	0	23	4	0	2	17	0

=== Postseason ===
Year	Team	Games		Tackles					Interceptions						Fumbles				
Year	Team	GP	GS	Cmb	Solo	Ast	Sck	TFL	Int	Yds	Avg	Lng	TD	PD	FF	Fum	FR	Yds	TD
2022	JAX	**2**	**1**	2	1	**1**	0.0	0	0	0	0.0	0	0	0	0	0	0	0	0
2025	JAX	1	**1**	**4**	**3**	**1**	0.0	0	0	0	0.0	0	0	0	0	0	0	0	0
Career		3	2	6	4	2	0.0	0	0	0	0.0	0	0	0	0	0	0	0	0
