= Weingarten =

Weingarten may refer to:

== Places ==
- Weingarten, Württemberg, Germany, a town
  - Weingarten Abbey
- Weingarten (Baden), Germany, a municipality
- Weingarten (Freiburg im Breisgau), Germany, a district
- Weingarten, Rhineland-Palatinate, Germany, a municipality
- Weingarten, Thuringia, Germany, a village and former municipality
- Weingarten, Switzerland, a village in the municipality of Lommis
- Weingarten, Missouri, United States, an unincorporated community and census-designated place

== Other uses ==
- Weingarten (surname)
- Weingarten Realty, a former real estate investment trust
- Weingarten's, a defunct Texas-based grocer

== See also ==
- Weingarten equations in differential geometry
- Weingarten Rights, in American law the right to union representation at investigatory interviews
- Weingarten Manuscript, a medieval German manuscript
- Weingartner
- Wingard, Saskatchewan, Canada (an anglicized form of the name)
- Vinograd (disambiguation)
- Winograd
- Wijngaarden
