= Austin Fort =

American football player (born 1995)

Profile
- Position: Tight end

Personal information
- Born: May 14, 1995 (age 31); Gillette, Wyoming, U.S.
- Listed height: 6 ft 4 in (1.93 m)
- Listed weight: 244 lb (111 kg)

Career information
- High school: Campbell County (Gillette)
- College: Wyoming
- NFL draft: 2019: undrafted

Career history
- Denver Broncos (2019–2020); Tennessee Titans (2021–2022)*
- * Offseason or practice squad member only
- Stats at Pro Football Reference

Austin Fort (born May 14, 1995) is an American former professional football player who was a tight end in the National Football League (NFL). He played college football for the Wyoming Cowboys.

== Early life ==
Fort attended Campbell County High School in Gillette, Wyoming, where he played quarterback, punter, and placekicker. In his two-year career starting at quarterback for the Campbell County Camels, he totaled 4,667 yards with 45 touchdowns on only 4 interceptions and helped lead his team to the Wyoming 4A state championship in 2012. Fort was considered a first-team all-state selection at quarterback and kicker as both a junior and senior, was named the top football recruit in Wyoming as a senior, and was a Top 25 Rocky Mountain state selection. A 2-star recruit, Austin chose to stay in-state and played at University of Wyoming over offers from Air Force, Colorado, Colorado State, Illinois, and Sam Houston State.

== College career ==
In 2014, Fort redshirted as a freshman at the University of Wyoming. The following spring, Fort was transitioned from quarterback to tight end. This decision prompted Fort to transfer to Chabot Community College to continue playing quarterback. In his one season at Chabot, Fort appeared in eight games, throwing for 282 yards on 20 pass attempts, with three touchdowns and one interception. Fort returned to Wyoming for the 2016 season as a tight end. He appeared in all of the team's 13 games, exclusively on special teams, where he recorded two tackles. In the 2017 and 2018 seasons, Fort started at tight end for the Cowboys and caught 17 passes for 229 yards and four touchdowns.

== Professional career ==
=== Denver Broncos ===
After going undrafted in the 2019 draft, Austin Fort was invited to participate at the Denver Broncos training camp. Fort impressed the Broncos and he was signed to the team following training camp. He caught 87 yards and a touchdown in the preseason game against the Seattle Seahawks, but tore his ACL after catching a 29-yard dive pass and landing on his knee. Fort was placed on injury reserve on August 9, 2019. On July 29, 2020, Austin Fort was promoted to the active roster. However, Fort agitated his previous knee injury during practice and was placed on injured reserve on August 14, 2020.

On August 31, 2021, Fort was waived by the Broncos.

=== Tennessee Titans ===
On September 14, 2021, Fort was signed to the Tennessee Titans practice squad. After the Titans were eliminated in the Divisional Round of the 2021 playoffs, he signed a reserve/future contract on January 24, 2022. He was waived on May 2.
