= Dominik Eberle =

American football player (born 1996)

Berlin Thunder (ELF)
- Position: Placekicker
- Roster status: Active

Personal information
- Born: July 4, 1996 (age 30); Nuremberg, Germany
- Listed height: 6 ft 2 in (1.88 m)
- Listed weight: 190 lb (86 kg)

Career information
- High school: Redondo Union (Redondo Beach, California)
- College: Utah State (2015–2019)
- NFL draft: 2020: undrafted
- CFL draft: 2021G: 4th round, 29th overall pick

Career history
- Las Vegas Raiders (2020)*; Carolina Panthers (2021)*; Houston Texans (2021); Carolina Panthers (2021)*; Green Bay Packers (2022)*; Detroit Lions (2022); Seattle Sea Dragons (2023); Berlin Thunder (2024–present)
- * Offseason or practice squad member only

Awards and highlights
- First-team All Mountain West (2019)

Career NFL statistics
- Field goals made: 3
- Field goal attempts: 4
- Field goal %: 75
- Longest field goal: 51
- Touchbacks: 3
- Stats at Pro Football Reference

Dominik Eberle (born July 4, 1996) is a German professional American football placekicker for the Berlin Thunder of the European League of Football (ELF). He played college football for the Utah State Aggies. He made his NFL debut in Week 16 of the 2021 NFL season.

== Early life ==
Eberle was born in Nuremberg, Germany in 1996 to Güenther Eberle and Carmen Romero-Eberle. He has one sibling. Eberle moved to California at the age of 14 and attended Redondo Union High School where he played football and soccer.

== College career ==
Eberle enrolled to play football at Utah State University in 2015 and redshirted his first year. After appearing in 4 games in his redshirt first year, Eberle earned starting kicking duties in 2017 as a redshirt sophomore. Eberle performed well appearing in all 13 games, hitting all 47 extra point attempts, and hitting 18 of 24 field goal attempts. Eberle was named a finalist for the Lou Groza Award. Eberle would go on to start his junior and senior seasons. Eberle finished his career at Utah State hitting 64 field goals and 167 extra points, setting the program record for field goals made.

== Professional career ==
Pre-draft measurables
Height	Weight	Arm length	Hand span
6 ft 1 1/2 in (1.87 m)	186 lb (84 kg)	31 3/4 in (0.81 m)	8 3/8 in (0.21 m)
All values from Pro Day

=== Las Vegas Raiders ===
After going undrafted in the 2020 NFL draft, Eberle was signed to the practice squad for the Las Vegas Raiders.

=== Carolina Panthers (first stint) ===
In 2021, Eberle would join the Carolina Panthers practice squad. After being cut and resigned again, Eberle was ultimately cut again from the Panthers.

=== Houston Texans ===
Ahead of week 16, Houston Texans kicker Kaʻimi Fairbairn was placed on the COVID-19 restricted list, and in anticipation, the Texans signed Eberle to their practice squad. On December 26, 2021, Fairbairn was unable to return to the team and Eberle was promoted to debut in his first NFL game against the Los Angeles Chargers. He was released on January 5, 2022.

=== Carolina Panthers (second stint) ===
On January 8, 2022, Eberle was signed to the Carolina Panthers practice squad.

=== Green Bay Packers ===
On February 22, 2022, Eberle signed with the Green Bay Packers. On June 14, he was released.

=== Detroit Lions ===
On September 9, 2022, Eberle was signed to the Detroit Lions practice squad. He was promoted to the active roster on October 1. He was released on October 4, after missing two extra points in Week 4.

=== Seattle Sea Dragons ===
On February 6, 2023, the Seattle Sea Dragons of the XFL signed Eberle and released kicker Brandon Ruiz. He played in 10 games, making 14-of-18 field goals (77.8%). The Sea Dragons folded when the XFL and USFL merged to create the United Football League (UFL).

=== Berlin Thunder ===
On April 11, 2024, Eberle signed with the Berlin Thunder of the European League of Football (ELF).

== NFL career statistics ==
Year	Team	GP	Field goals									Extra points			Total points
Year	Team	GP	FGM	FGA	FG%	<20	20−29	30−39	40−49	50+	Lng	XPM	XPA	XP%	Total points
2021	HOU	1	2	3	66.7	0−0	1-1	0−0	0−0	1−2	51	5	5	100.0	11
2022	DET	1	1	1	100.0	0−0	0−0	0−0	1−1	0−0	49	2	4	50.0	5
Total		2	3	4	75.0	0−0	1-1	0−0	1-1	1−2	51	7	9	77.8	16
Source: pro-football-reference.com
