= Darwin Thompson =

American football player (born 1997)

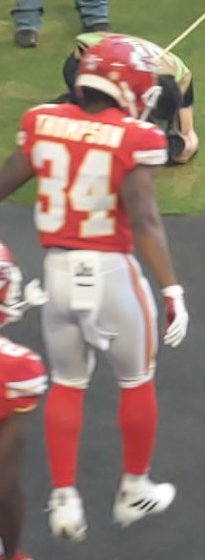
- Thompson with the Kansas City Chiefs in 2020

Profile
- Position: Running back

Personal information
- Born: February 12, 1997 (age 29); Tulsa, Oklahoma, U.S.
- Listed height: 5 ft 8 in (1.73 m)
- Listed weight: 200 lb (91 kg)

Career information
- High school: Jenks (Jenks, Oklahoma)
- College: Northeastern Oklahoma A&M (2015–2017); Utah State (2018)
- NFL draft: 2019: 6th round, 214th overall pick

Career history
- Kansas City Chiefs (2019–2020); Tampa Bay Buccaneers (2021)*; Kansas City Chiefs (2021); Seattle Seahawks (2022–2023)*; Las Vegas Raiders (2023)*
- * Offseason or practice squad member only

Awards and highlights
- Super Bowl champion (LIV); Second-team All-MWC (2018); Second-team NJCAA All-American (2017); Southwest Junior College Conference Offensive MVP (2017)

Career NFL statistics
- Rushing yards: 225
- Rushing average: 3.5
- Rushing touchdowns: 2
- Receptions: 16
- Receiving yards: 108
- Receiving touchdowns: 1
- Stats at Pro Football Reference

Darwin Thompson (born February 12, 1997) is an American professional football running back. He played college football at Northeastern Oklahoma A&M College before transferring to Utah State. Thompson was selected by the Kansas City Chiefs in the sixth round of the 2019 NFL draft. Thompson won a Super Bowl title as part of the Chiefs in Super Bowl LIV.

== Early life ==
Thompson grew up in Tulsa, Oklahoma and attended Jenks High School. As a senior in 2014, he rushed for 942 yards and 10 touchdowns on 152 carries as the backup running back, and helped the team win a Class 6A-I state championship. As a football prospect, he was rated as a three-star recruit and the 16th highest rated recruit in the state of Oklahoma by the 247Sports Composite.

== College career ==
Thompson received zero NCAA Division I scholarship offers coming out of high school. He enrolled at Northeastern Oklahoma A&M, a junior college in Miami, Oklahoma, and redshirted the 2015 season. As a redshirt freshman in 2016, he posted 1,029 rushing yards and nine touchdowns on 150 attempts. As a redshirt sophomore in 2017, he was named Offensive MVP of the Southwest Junior Football Conference and an NJCAA second-team All-American after he ran for 1,391 yards and eight touchdowns on the year. His 2,420 career rushing yards is the second-most in Northeastern Oklahoma A&M school history.

Coming out of junior college, Thompson was again rated as a three-star recruit, ranked as the best JUCO all-purpose back in the country by 247Sports. He committed to play at Utah State on December 17, 2017.

Thompson played one season at Utah State, starting in nine games and playing in 13 during the 2018 season. On November 3, he rushed for a career high 140 yards and three touchdowns against Hawaii, and was named Mountain West Conference Offensive Player of the Week. He rushed for 1,044 yards and 14 touchdowns on 153 attempts on the year, and was named second-team All-Mountain West Conference.

== Professional career ==
Pre-draft measurables
Height	Weight	Arm length	Hand span	40-yard dash	10-yard split	20-yard split	20-yard shuttle	Three-cone drill	Vertical jump	Broad jump	Bench press
5 ft 8 in (1.73 m)	198 lb (90 kg)	29 3/4 in (0.76 m)	8 3/8 in (0.21 m)	4.55 s	1.58 s	2.63 s	4.30 s	6.93 s	39.0 in (0.99 m)	10 ft 6 in (3.20 m)	23 reps
All values from Pro Day

=== Kansas City Chiefs (first stint) ===
Thompson was drafted by the Kansas City Chiefs in the sixth round with the 214th overall pick in the 2019 NFL draft. As a rookie, Thompson appeared in 12 games and recorded 37 carries for 128 rushing yards and one rushing touchdown to go along with nine receptions for 43 receiving yards. In the Divisional Round of the playoffs against the Houston Texans, Thompson recovered a fumble forced by teammate Daniel Sorensen on punt returner DeAndre Carter during the 51–31 win. The Chiefs went on to win Super Bowl LIV after defeating the San Francisco 49ers 31–20 to give Thompson his first championship.

In Week 17 of the 2020 season against the Los Angeles Chargers, Thompson recorded 110 yards from scrimmage, one rushing touchdown, and one receiving touchdown during the 38–21 loss. He was released on August 31, 2021.

=== Tampa Bay Buccaneers ===
On September 2, 2021, Thompson signed with the Tampa Bay Buccaneers as part of their practice squad. He was released on January 13, 2022.

=== Kansas City Chiefs (second stint) ===
Thompson was signed to the Kansas City Chiefs' practice squad on January 14, 2022.

=== Seattle Seahawks ===
On February 16, 2022, Thompson signed a reserve/future contract with the Seattle Seahawks. He was waived by Seattle on August 30, and re-signed to the practice squad the next day.

Thompson signed a reserve/future contract with Seattle on January 17, 2023. He was waived by the Seahawks on April 17.

=== Las Vegas Raiders ===
On August 12, 2023, Thompson signed with the Las Vegas Raiders. He was waived on August 27.

== Personal life ==
Darwin is the son of Rueben and Lashonne Thompson. He is the nephew of former St. Louis Rams and Oklahoma State running back David Thompson. Thompson is a Christian.
