= 2018 Arizona State Sun Devils football team =

American college football season

2018 Arizona State Sun Devils football

Las Vegas Bowl, L 20–31 vs. Fresno State
- Conference: Pac-12 Conference
- South Division
- Record: 7–6 (5–4 Pac-12)
- Head coach: Herm Edwards (1st season)
- Offensive coordinator: Rob Likens (1st season)
- Offensive scheme: Spread
- Defensive coordinator: Danny Gonzales (1st season)
- Base defense: 3–3–5
- Captains: Cohl Cabral; DeMonte King; Manny Wilkins; Renell Wren
- Home stadium: Sun Devil Stadium

2018 Pac-12 Conference football standings
| | Conf. | | | Overall |
| Team | W | | L | W | | L |
|---|---|---|---|---|---|---|
North Division
| No. 13 Washington xy$ | 7 | – | 2 | 10 | – | 4 |
| No. 10 Washington State x | 7 | – | 2 | 11 | – | 2 |
| Stanford | 6 | – | 3 | 9 | – | 4 |
| Oregon | 5 | – | 4 | 9 | – | 4 |
| California | 4 | – | 5 | 7 | – | 6 |
| Oregon State | 1 | – | 8 | 2 | – | 10 |
South Division
| Utah xy | 6 | – | 3 | 9 | – | 5 |
| Arizona State | 5 | – | 4 | 7 | – | 6 |
| USC | 4 | – | 5 | 5 | – | 7 |
| Arizona | 4 | – | 5 | 5 | – | 7 |
| UCLA | 3 | – | 6 | 3 | – | 9 |
| Colorado | 2 | – | 7 | 5 | – | 7 |
Championship: Washington 10, Utah 3
$ – Conference champion; x – Division champion/co-champions; y – Championship game participant; Rankings from AP Poll

The 2018 Arizona State Sun Devils football team represented Arizona State University in the 2018 NCAA Division I FBS football season. They were led by first year head coach Herm Edwards and played their home games at Sun Devil Stadium. They were a member of the South Division of the Pac-12 Conference. The Sun Devils finished the season 7–6, 5–4 in Pac-12 play to finish in second place in the South Division. They were invited to the Las Vegas Bowl where they lost to Fresno State.

== Personnel ==
=== Coaching staff ===
| Name | Position | Consecutive season at Arizona State in current position |
|---|---|---|
| Herm Edwards | Head coach | 1st Year |
| Donnie Yantis | Assistant head coach/recruiting coordinator | 1st Year |
| John Simon | Assistant head coach/running backs coach | 3rd Year |
| Shawn Slocum | Associate head coach/special teams coordinator/linebackers coach | 1st Year |
| Danny Gonzales | Defensive coordinator | 1st Year |
| Rob Likens | Offensive coordinator/quarterbacks coach | 2nd Year |
| Tony White | Assistant coach/passing game coordinator/cornerbacks coach | 1st Year |
| Antonio Pierce | Assistant coach/linebackers coach | 1st Year |
| Dave Christensen | Assistant coach/offensive line coach | 1st Year |
| Charlie Fisher | Assistant coach/wide receivers coach | 1st Year |
| Shaun Nua | Assistant coach/defensive line coach | 1st Year |

=== Roster ===
2018 Arizona State Sun Devils roster
| Quarterbacks: 5 Manny Wilkins, (redshirt) Senior; 7 Beau Barrington, Freshman; 8 Kurt Walding, (redshirt) Sophomore; 9 Grayson Barry, Sophomore; 14 Ryan Kelley, (redshirt) Freshman; 15 Dillon Sterling-Cole, (redshirt) Sophomore; 16 Bobby Avina, Freshman; Running backs: 3 Eno Benjamin, Sophomore; 29 A.J. Carter, Freshman; 31 Isaiah Floyd, (redshirt) Freshman; 32 Paul Lucas, (redshirt) Junior; 32 Tavian Gould, Freshman; 35 Brock Sturges, Freshman; Wide receivers: 1 N'Keal Harry, Junior; 2 Brandon Aiyuk, Junior; 10 Kyle Williams, Junior; 12 John Humphrey, (redshirt) Junior; 14 Ryan Jenkins, (redshirt) Sophomore; 17 Ryan Newsome, (redshirt) Junior; 19 Terrell Chatman, (redshirt) Sophomore; 26 Keith Davis, Freshman; 28 Angel Ruiz, Freshman; 83 Geordon Porter, Freshman; 84 Frank Darby, (redshirt) Sophomore; 85 Trevor Russell, (redshirt) Freshman; 86 Curtis Hodges, Sophomore; 91 Kyle Remo, (redshirt) Sophomore; -- Tyrell Baldonado-Kaeiopu, Freshman; -- Tanner Park, (redshirt) Freshman | Tight ends: 80 Mark Walton, (redshirt) Freshman; 81 Jared Bubak, (redshirt) Sophomore; 87 Tommy Hudson, (redshirt) Junior; 88 Ceejhay French-Love, Senior; 89 Jarick Caldwell, Freshman; 90 Josh Pokraka, Senior; 92 Michael Gombert, (redshirt) Freshman; Offensive lineman: 50 Jarrett Bell, Freshman; 51 Zach Robertson, (redshirt) Junior; 55 Casey Tucker, Graduate Student; 56 Alex Losoya, (redshirt) Junior; 58 Tyson Rising, (redshirt) Senior; 59 Quinn Bailey, (redshirt) Senior; 60 Kyle Breed, (redshirt) Freshman; 61 Marco Salas, Freshman; 62 Jesse Cozens, (redshirt) Freshman; 63 Roy Hemsley, (redshirt) Junior; 64 Eddie Medina, Freshman; 66 Mason Schell, Sophomore; 69 Jonathan Sanchez, (redshirt) Freshman; 70 Michael Tate, (redshirt) Sophomore; 71 Steven Miller, (redshirt) Junior; 72 Cade Cote, (redshirt) Junior; 73 Cohl Cabral, Junior; 74 Corey Stephens, Sophomore; 76 Spencer Lovell, Freshman; 79 Ralph Frias, Freshman | Defensive line: 2 Darius Slade, (redshirt) Junior; 41 Tyler Johnson, (redshirt) Freshman; 45 George Lea, (redshirt) Junior; 57 Jordon Hoyt, (redshirt) Senior; 90 Jermayne Lole, Freshman; 91 Michael Matus, Freshman; 92 Nami Tuitu'u, Freshman; 95 Renell Wren, (redshirt) Senior; 96 Jalen Bates, (redshirt) Junior; 97 Shannon Forman, Sophomore; 98 DJ Davidson, (redshirt) Freshman; 99 Dougladson Subtyl, (redshirt) Senior; Linebackers: 4 Koron Crump, (redshirt) Senior; 8 Merlin Robertson, Freshman; 9 Jay Jay Wilson, Senior; 20 Khaylan Kearse-Thomas, (redshirt) Junior; 23 Tyler Whiley, (redshirt) Senior; 34 Kyle Soelle, (redshirt) Freshman; 39 Malik Lawal, (redshirt) Junior; 50 Ochuko Duke, Senior; 51 Kyle Jones, (redshirt) Junior; 52 Reggie Hughes, Freshman; 53 Stanley Lambert, (redshirt) Freshman; 54 Darien Butler, Freshman; 56 Benjamin Winans, (redshirt) Freshman; 58 Parker Higgins, (redshirt) Freshman; 68 Anthony Nicastro, (redshirt) Freshman; Defensive backs: 5 Kobe Williams, Junior; 6 Evan Fields, (redshirt) Freshman; 7 Dominique Harrison Junior; 10 K.J Jarrell, (redshirt) Sophomore; 12 Cody French, (redshirt) Junior; 13 Darian Kornay, Junior; 18 Langston Frederick, Sophomore; 21 Terin Adams, (redshirt) Sophomore; 24 Chase Lucas, (redshirt) Sophomore; 25 Preston Liger, Freshman; 28 Demonte King, Senior; 30 Dasmond Tautalatasi, (redshirt) Senior; 36 Alijah Gammage, Freshman; 37 Joey Bryant, (redshirt) Senior; 46 Caleb McShanag, (redshirt) Freshman; 48 Jalen Russell, (redshirt) Junior; 49 Kordell Caldwell, Freshman | Safeties: 15 Cam Philips, Freshman; 16 Aashari Crosswell, Freshman; 26 Ty Thomas, Sophomore; 43 Jalen Harvey, (redshirt) Senior; 48 Ely Doyle, Freshman; Fullback: 22 Mark Cosgrove, (redshirt) Senior; 22 Nick Ralston, (redshirt) Junior; Kickers: 1 Brandon Ruiz, Sophomore; 43 John O'Brien, (redshirt) Senior; 45 Cristian Zendejas, (redshirt) Freshman; 94 Joseph Zepp, Freshman; Punters: 19 Matthew Bazarevitsch, (redshirt) Freshman; 25 Michael Turk, Sophomore; 36 Michael Sleep-Dalton, (redshirt) Senior; 44 Kevin Macias, Junior; Long snappers: 61 Joseph Reeves, (redshirt) Freshman; 64 Riley John, (redshirt) Sophomore; 93 Erik Dickerson, Junior |

== Offseason departures ==
ASU had 18 Graduates, 2 transfers, 1 left the team, 1 retired medically.

| Name | Number | Pos. | Year | Notes |
|---|---|---|---|---|
| DJ Calhoun | 3 | LB | Senior | Graduated |
| Koron Crump | 3 | LB | Senior | Graduated |
| Demario Richard | 4 | RB | Senior | Graduated |
| Kalen Ballage | 7 | RB | Senior | Graduated |
| Maurice Chandler | 16 | DB | Senior | Graduated |
| J'Marcus Rhodes | 17 | DB | Senior | Graduated |
| Chad Adams | 21 | DB | Senior | Graduated |
| Jacom Brimhall | 35 | RB | Senior | Graduated |
| Mitchell Fraboni | 63 | LS | Senior | Graduated |
| A.J McCollum | 65 | OL | Senior | Graduated |
| Tashon Smallwood | 90 | DL | Senior | Graduated |
| Christian Hill | 94 | DL | Senior | Graduated |
| Ryan Jenkins | 14 | WR | (redshirt) Senior | Graduated |
| Marcus Ball | 31 | LB | (redshirt) Senior | Graduated |
| Alani Latu | 44 | LB | (redshirt) Senior | Graduated |
| Frank Ogas | 48 | TE | (redshirt) Senior | Graduated |
| Corey Smith | 55 | DE | (redshirt) Senior | Graduated |
| Tyler McClure | 75 | OL | (redshirt) Senior | Graduated |
| Sam Jones | 76 | OL | Junior | Entered 2018 NFL draft |
| Brady White | 2 | QB | (redshirt) Junior | transferred to Memphis |
| Alex Perry | 14 | DB | Sophomore | Left the team |
| Marshal Nathe | 78 | OL | (redshirt) Sophomore | Medically retired |
| Blake Barnett | 8 | QB | (redshirt) Junior | Transferred |

=== 2018 NFL draft ===
==== ASU players drafted into the NFL ====
| Player | Position | Round | Pick | NFL team |
|---|---|---|---|---|
| Kalen Ballage | Running back | 4 | 131 | Miami Dolphins |
| Christian Sam | Linebacker | 6 | 178 | New England Patriots |
| Sam Jones | Offensive guard | 6 | 183 | Denver Broncos |

==== Undrafted NFL free agents ====
| Player | Position | NFL team |
|---|---|---|
| Demario Richard | Running back | Atlanta Falcons |
| JoJo Wicker | Defensive lineman | Detroit Lions |

== Preseason ==
On December 20, 2017, NCAA Football had its first ever early signing period, during which Arizona State signed nine recruits. On national signing day the Sun Devils received eight more high school recruits tipping off the signing period with a total of 17 high school recruits, four JUCO transfers and one transfer which totals 22 total recruits in the 2018 offseason.

=== Recruiting class ===
College recruiting information
| Name | Hometown | School | Height | Weight | Commit date |
|---|---|---|---|---|---|
| Reggie Hughes; OLB | Calabasas, CA | Calabasas HS | 6 ft 2 in (1.88 m) | 210 lb (95 kg) | |
| Reggie Hughes; OLB | Recruit ratings: Scout: 247Sports: ESPN: | | | | |
| Demetrious Flowers; RB | Bellflower, CA | St. John Bosco HS | 5 ft 11 in (1.80 m) | 200 lb (91 kg) | |
| Demetrious Flowers; RB | Recruit ratings: Scout: 247Sports: ESPN: | | | | |
| Stanley Lambert; ATH | San Antonio, TX | Marshall HS | 6 ft 3 in (1.91 m) | 211 lb (96 kg) | |
| Stanley Lambert; ATH | Recruit ratings: Scout: 247Sports: ESPN: | | | | |
| Michael Matus; DE | Katy, TX | Katy HS | 6 ft 2 in (1.88 m) | 235 lb (107 kg) | |
| Michael Matus; DE | Recruit ratings: Scout: 247Sports: ESPN: | | | | |
| AJ Carter; RB | Many, LA | Many HS | 6 ft 0 in (1.83 m) | 220 lb (100 kg) | |
| AJ Carter; RB | Recruit ratings: Scout: 247Sports: ESPN: | | | | |
| Brock Sturges; RB | Allen, TX | Allen HS | 5 ft 10 in (1.78 m) | 200 lb (91 kg) | |
| Brock Sturges; RB | Recruit ratings: Scout: 247Sports: ESPN: | | | | |
| Christian LaValle; LB | Mission Viejo, CA | Mission Viejo HS | 6 ft 0 in (1.83 m) | 215 lb (98 kg) | |
| Christian LaValle; LB | Recruit ratings: Scout: 247Sports: ESPN: | | | | |
| Ralph Frias; OL | Safford, AZ | Safford HS | 6 ft 7 in (2.01 m) | 305 lb (138 kg) | |
| Ralph Frias; OL | Recruit ratings: Scout: 247Sports: ESPN: | | | | |
| Elyjah Doyle; S | Mission Hills, CA | Bishop Alemany HS | 6 ft 0 in (1.83 m) | 188 lb (85 kg) | |
| Elyjah Doyle; S | Recruit ratings: Scout: 247Sports: ESPN: | | | | |
| Spencer Lovell; OL | Fort Collins, CO | Rocky Mountain HS | 6 ft 7 in (2.01 m) | 303 lb (137 kg) | |
| Spencer Lovell; OL | Recruit ratings: Scout: 247Sports: ESPN: | | | | |
| Cameron Phillips; S | Houston, TX | Clear Lake HS | 6 ft 1 in (1.85 m) | 170 lb (77 kg) | |
| Cameron Phillips; S | Recruit ratings: Scout: 247Sports: ESPN: | | | | |
| Jarrett Bell; OL | Norco, CA | Norco HS | 6 ft 5 in (1.96 m) | 295 lb (134 kg) | |
| Jarrett Bell; OL | Recruit ratings: Scout: 247Sports: ESPN: | | | | |
| Jermayne Lole; DL | Long Beach, CA | Long Beach Poly HS | 6 ft 2 in (1.88 m) | 270 lb (120 kg) | |
| Jermayne Lole; DL | Recruit ratings: Scout: 247Sports: ESPN: | | | | |
| Aashari Crosswell; DB | Long Beach, CA | Long Beach Poly HS | 6 ft 0 in (1.83 m) | 190 lb (86 kg) | |
| Aashari Crosswell; DB | Recruit ratings: Scout: 247Sports: ESPN: | | | | |
| Geordon Porter; WR | Rancho Cucamonga CA | Etiwanda HS | 6 ft 2 in (1.88 m) | 180 lb (82 kg) | |
| Geordon Porter; WR | Recruit ratings: Scout: 247Sports: ESPN: | | | | |
| Darien Butler; LB | Harbor City, CA | Narbonne HS | 5 ft 11 in (1.80 m) | 232 lb (105 kg) | |
| Darien Butler; LB | Recruit ratings: Scout: 247Sports: ESPN: | | | | |
| Merlin Robertson; OLB | Gardena, CA | Junipero Serra HS | 6 ft 3 in (1.91 m) | 235 lb (107 kg) | |
| Merlin Robertson; OLB | Recruit ratings: Scout: 247Sports: ESPN: | | | | |

=== Incoming transfers ===
Arizona State had four junior college transfers and one college transfer.

List of incoming transfers
| Name | Pos. | Eligible beginning | Years of eligibility | Previous school |
|---|---|---|---|---|
| Dominique Harrison | CB | 2018 | 2 | Blinn College |
| Terin Adams | CB | 2018 | 3 | City College of San Francisco |
| Casey Tucker | OT | 2018 | 1 | Stanford |
| Isaiah Floyd | RB | 2018 | 4 | City College of San Francisco |
| Brandon Aiyuk | ATH | 2018 | 2 | Sierra College |

=== Pac-12 media days ===
The 2018 Pac-12 media days started on July 25, 2018 in Hollywood, California. Herm Edwards (HC), N'Keal Harry (WR) & Manny Wilkins (QB) at Pac-12 Media Days. The Pac-12 media poll was released with the Sun Devils predicted to finish in last place at Pac-12 South division.

=== Award watch lists ===
Listed in the order that they were released

| Award | Player | Position | Year |
|---|---|---|---|
| Lott Trophy | Koron Crump | LB | SR |
| Rimington Trophy | Cohl Cabral | C | JR |
| Maxwell Award | Manny Wilkins | QB | SR |
| Maxwell Award | N'Keal Harry | WR | JR |
| Davey O'Brien Award | Manny Wilkins | QB | SR |
| Doak Walker Award | Eno Benjamin | RB | So |
| Fred Biletnikoff Award | N'Keal Harry | WR | JR |
| Bronko Nagurski Trophy | Chase Lucas | DB | SO |
| Lou Groza Award | Brandon Ruiz | K | SO |
| Paul Hornung Award | N'Keal Harry | WR | JR |
| Wuerffel Trophy | Manny Wilkins | QB | SR |
| Johnny Unitas Golden Arm Award | Manny Wilkins | QB | SR |
| Manning Award | Manny Wilkins | QB | SR |
| Earl Campbell Tyler Rose Award | Eno Benjamin | RB | SO |

== Schedule ==
| Date | Time | Opponent | Rank | Site | TV | Result | Attendance |
|---|---|---|---|---|---|---|---|
| September 1 | 7:30 p.m. | UTSA* | | Sun Devil Stadium; Tempe, AZ | FS1 | W 49–7 | 50,188 |
| September 8 | 7:45 p.m. | No. 15 Michigan State* | | Sun Devil Stadium; Tempe, AZ | ESPN | W 16–13 | 53,599 |
| September 15 | 7:30 p.m. | at San Diego State* | No. 23 | SDCCU Stadium; San Diego, CA | CBSSN | L 21–28 | 34,641 |
| September 22 | 7:30 p.m. | at No. 10 Washington | | Husky Stadium; Seattle, WA | ESPN | L 20–27 | 71,200 |
| September 29 | 7:00 p.m. | Oregon State | | Sun Devil Stadium; Tempe, AZ | P12N | W 52–24 | 51,447 |
| October 6 | 1:00 p.m. | at No. 21 Colorado | | Folsom Field; Boulder, CO | P12N | L 21–28 | 52,681 |
| October 18 | 6:00 p.m. | Stanford | | Sun Devil Stadium; Tempe, AZ | ESPN | L 13–20 | 42,946 |
| October 27 | 12:30 p.m. | at USC | | Los Angeles Memorial Coliseum; Los Angeles, CA | ABC/ESPN2 | W 38–35 | 47,406 |
| November 3 | 1:00 p.m. | No. 16 Utah^{†} | | Sun Devil Stadium; Tempe, AZ | P12N | W 38–20 | 46,445 |
| November 10 | 12:00 p.m. | UCLA | | Sun Devil Stadium; Tempe, AZ | P12N | W 31–28 | 46,466 |
| November 17 | 8:30 p.m. | at Oregon | | Autzen Stadium; Eugene, OR | P12N | L 29–31 | 50,485 |
| November 24 | 1:30 p.m. | at Arizona | | Arizona Stadium; Tucson, AZ (Territorial Cup) | FS1 | W 41–40 | 51,805 |
| December 15 | 1:30 p.m. | vs. No. 19 Fresno State* | | Sam Boyd Stadium; Whitney, NV (Las Vegas Bowl) | ABC | L 20–31 | 37,146 |
*Non-conference game; ^{†}Homecoming; Rankings from AP Poll released prior to the game; All times are in Mountain time

== Rankings ==
Ranking movements Legend: ██ Increase in ranking ██ Decrease in ranking — = Not ranked RV = Received votes
| | Week | | | | | | | | | | | | | | | |
| Poll | Pre | 1 | 2 | 3 | 4 | 5 | 6 | 7 | 8 | 9 | 10 | 11 | 12 | 13 | 14 | Final |
|---|---|---|---|---|---|---|---|---|---|---|---|---|---|---|---|---|
| AP | — | — | 23 | RV | RV | RV | — | — | — | — | — | RV | — | — | — | — |
| Coaches | — | — | 25 | RV | RV | RV | — | — | — | — | — | RV | — | — | — | — |
| CFP | Not released | | | | | | | | | — | — | — | — | — | — | Not released |

== Game summaries ==
=== vs UTSA ===
UTSA Roadrunners (0–0) vs Arizona State Sun Devils (0–0) – Game summary

| Quarter | 1 | 2 | 3 | 4 | Total |
|---|---|---|---|---|---|
| Roadrunners | 0 | 0 | 0 | 7 | 7 |
| Sun Devils | 14 | 14 | 14 | 7 | 49 |

at Sun Devil Stadium • Tempe, AZ

- Date: September 1, 2018
- Game time: 7:30 p.m.
- Game weather: Partly cloudy, 99 °F (37 °C)
- Game attendance: 50,188
- Referee: Jay Edwards
- TV announcers (FS1): Chris Myers (play-by-play), James Laurinaitis (analyst)

Game information

First quarter

- (13:44) ASU – N'Keal Harry 58-yard pass from Manny Wilkins, Brandon Ruiz kick (Drive: 4 plays, 81 yards, 1:16; Arizona State 7–0)
- (13:01) ASU – Shannon Forman 25-yard interception return, Brandon Ruiz kick (Arizona State 14–0)

Second quarter

- (4:26) ASU – Eno Benjamin 3-yard run, Brandon Ruiz kick (Drive: 7 plays, 64 yards, 3:27; Arizona State 21–0)
- (0:32) ASU – Terrell Chatman 11-yard pass from Manny Wilkins, Brandon Ruiz kick (Drive: 5 plays, 43 yards, 2:22; Arizona State 28–0)

Third quarter

- (5:41) ASU – Eno Benjamin 7-yard pass from Manny Wilkins, Brandon Ruiz kick (Drive: 7 plays, 60 yards, 3:01; Arizona State 35–0)
- (0:57) ASU – N'Keal Harry 31-yard pass from Manny Wilkins, Brandon Ruiz kick (Drive: 5 plays, 61 yards, 1:47; Arizona State 42–0)

Fourth quarter

- (11:38) ASU – Isaiah Floyd 5-yard run, Brandon Ruiz kick (Drive: 5 plays, 35 yards, 2:32; Arizona State 49–0)
- (6:03) UTSA – B.J. Daniels 4-yard run, Jared Sackett kick (Drive: 11 plays, 75 yards, 5:35; Arizona State 49–7)

| Statistics | UTSA | ASU |
|---|---|---|
| First downs | 18 | 21 |
| Total yards | 220 | 503 |
| Rushing yards | 34–2 | 36–266 |
| Passing yards | 218 | 237 |
| Passing: Comp–Att–Int | 19–43–1 | 16–24–0 |
| Time of possession | 32:21 | 27:39 |

| Team | Category | Player | Statistics |
|---|---|---|---|
| UTSA | Passing | Cordale Grundy | 16/33, 187 yards, INT |
| UTSA | Rushing | B.J. Daniels | 9 carries, 24 yards, TD |
| UTSA | Receiving | Kirk Johnson Jr. | 5 receptions, 57 yards |
| Arizona State | Passing | Manny Wilkins | 16/24, 237 yards, 4 TD |
| Arizona State | Rushing | Eno Benjamin | 16 carries, 131 yards, TD |
| Arizona State | Receiving | N'Keal Harry | 6 receptions, 140 yards, 2 TD |

=== vs No. 15 Michigan State ===
No. 15 Michigan State Spartans (1–0) vs Arizona State Sun Devils (1–0) – Game summary

| Quarter | 1 | 2 | 3 | 4 | Total |
|---|---|---|---|---|---|
| No. 15 Spartans | 0 | 3 | 10 | 0 | 13 |
| Sun Devils | 0 | 0 | 3 | 13 | 16 |

at Sun Devil Stadium • Tempe, AZ

- Date: September 8, 2018
- Game time: 7:45 p.m.
- Game weather: Clear skies, 100 °F (38 °C)
- Game attendance: 53,599
- Referee: Mike Cannon
- TV announcers (ESPN): Dave Pasch (Play-by-play), Greg McElroy (analyst), Tom Luginbill (sideline reporter)

Game information

First quarter

- No scoring plays

Second quarter

- (13:19) MSU – Matt Coghlin 37-yard field goal (Drive: 13 plays, 80 yards, 7:31; Michigan State 3–0)

Third quarter

- (9:37) MSU – Matt Coghlin 28-yard field goal (Drive: 12 plays, 65 yards, 5:23; Michigan State 6–0)
- (7:48) ASU – Brandon Ruiz 49-yard field goal (Drive: 7 plays, 44 yards, 1:49; Michigan State 6–3)
- (1:27) MSU – Cody White 31-yard pass from Brian Lewerke, Matt Coghlin kick (Drive: 6 plays, 70 yards, 3:15; Michigan State 13–3)

Fourth quarter

- (14:19) ASU – Brandon Ruiz 24-yard field goal (Drive: 9 plays, 70 yards, 2:02; Michigan State 13–6)
- (8:45) ASU – N'Keal Harry 27-yard pass from Manny Wilkins, Brandon Ruiz kick (Drive: 2 plays, 65 yards, 0:27; Tied 13–13)
- (0:00) ASU – Brandon Ruiz 28-yard field goal (Drive: 13 plays, 69 yards, 4:55; Arizona State 16–13)

| Statistics | MSU | ASU |
|---|---|---|
| First downs | 23 | 27 |
| Total yards | 377 | 424 |
| Rushing yards | 27–63 | 29–44 |
| Passing yards | 314 | 380 |
| Passing: Comp–Att–Int | 27–39–1 | 30–48–1 |
| Time of possession | 32:05 | 27:55 |

| Team | Category | Player | Statistics |
|---|---|---|---|
| Michigan State | Passing | Brian Lewerke | 27/39, 314 yards, TD, INT |
| Michigan State | Rushing | Connor Heyward | 5 carries, 22 yards |
| Michigan State | Receiving | Cody White | 9 receptions, 113 yards, TD |
| Arizona State | Passing | Manny Wilkins | 30/48, 380 yards, TD, INT |
| Arizona State | Rushing | Eno Benjamin | 13 carries, 27 yards |
| Arizona State | Receiving | Kyle Williams | 7 receptions, 104 yards |

=== at San Diego State ===
No. 23 Arizona State Sun Devils (2–0) at San Diego State Aztecs (2–0) – Game summary

| Quarter | 1 | 2 | 3 | 4 | Total |
|---|---|---|---|---|---|
| No. 23 Sun Devils | 7 | 7 | 0 | 7 | 21 |
| Aztecs | 0 | 14 | 3 | 11 | 28 |

at SDCCU Stadium • San Diego, CA

- Date: September 14, 2018
- Game time: 7:30 p.m.
- Game weather: Clear, 73 °F (23 °C)
- Game attendance: 34,641
- Referee: Kevin Hassell
- TV announcers (CBS Sports Network): Carter Blackburn (play-by-play), Aaron Taylor (analyst), John Schriffen (sideline reporter)

Game information

First quarter

- (0:41) ASU – Brandon Aiyuk 12-yard pass from Manny Wilkins, Brandon Ruiz kick (Drive: 9 plays, 60 yards, 2:16; Arizona State 7–0)

Second quarter

- (10:28) SDSU – Juwan Washington 13-yard run, John Baron kick (Drive: 11 plays, 75 yards, 5:13; Tied 7–7)
- (8:06) ASU – Manny Wilkins 1-yard run, Brandon Ruiz kick (Drive: 7 plays, 82 yards, 2:16; Arizona State 14–7)
- (0:08) SDSU – Tim Wilson 9-yard pass from Ryan Agnew, John Baron kick (Drive: 11 plays, 85 yards, 1:33; Tied 14–14)

Third quarter

- (7:46) SDSU – John Baron 54-yard field goal (Drive: 10 plays, 40 yards, 5:35; San Diego State 17–14)

Fourth quarter

- (11:34) SDSU – John Baron 36-yard field goal (Drive: 12 plays, 44 yards, 5:05; San Diego State 20–14)
- (4:14) SDSU – Chase Jasmin 3-yard run, Ryan Agnew, Ryan Agnew two-point pass to Kahale Warring (Drive: 13 plays, 62 yards, 6:16; San Diego State 28–14)
- (1:40) ASU – N'Keal Harry 7-yard pass from Manny Wilkins, Brandon Ruiz kick (Drive: 11 plays, 82 yards, 2:28; San Diego State 28–21)

| Statistics | ASU | SDSU |
|---|---|---|
| First downs | 21 | 27 |
| Total yards | 377 | 440 |
| Rushing yards | 24–36 | 58–311 |
| Passing yards | 341 | 129 |
| Passing: Comp–Att–Int | 31–46–0 | 12–24–0 |
| Time of possession | 23:55 | 36:05 |

| Team | Category | Player | Statistics |
|---|---|---|---|
| Arizona State | Passing | Manny Wilkins | 31/46, 341 yards, 2 TD |
| Arizona State | Rushing | Eno Benjamin | 13 carries, 21 yards |
| Arizona State | Receiving | Frank Darby | 5 receptions, 127 yards |
| San Diego State | Passing | Ryan Agnew | 12/24, 129 yards, TD |
| San Diego State | Rushing | Juwan Washington | 27 carries, 138 yards, TD |
| San Diego State | Receiving | Kahale Warring | 4 receptions, 30 yards |

=== at No. 10 Washington ===
Arizona State Sun Devils (2–1) at No. 10 Washington Huskies (2–1) – Game summary

| Quarter | 1 | 2 | 3 | 4 | Total |
|---|---|---|---|---|---|
| Sun Devils | 10 | 0 | 3 | 7 | 20 |
| No. 10 Huskies | 14 | 3 | 3 | 7 | 27 |

at Husky Stadium • Seattle, WA

- Date: September 22, 2018
- Game time: 7:30 p.m.
- Game weather: Cloudy, 61 °F (16 °C)
- Game attendance: 71,200
- Referee: Michael Mothershed
- TV announcers (ESPN): Bob Wischusen (play-by-play), Brock Huard (analyst), Allison Williams (sideline reporter)

Game information

First quarter

- (12:02) ASU – Eno Benjamin 1-yard run, Brandon Ruiz kick (Drive: 6 plays, 20 yards, 2:45; Arizona State 7–0)
- (8:05) WASH – Aaron Fuller 11-yard pass from Jake Browning, Peyton Henry kick (Drive: 9 plays, 80 yards, 3:51; Tied 7–7)
- (3:53) ASU – Brandon Ruiz 48-yard field goal (Drive: 12 plays, 47 yards, 4:07; Arizona State 10–7)
- (0:57) WASH – Ty Jones 19-yard pass from Jake Browning, Peyton Henry kick (Drive: 5 plays, 75 yards, 2:56; Washington 14–10)

Second quarter

- (5:05) WASH – Peyton Henry 26-yard field goal (Drive: 16 plays, 73 yards, 7:13; Washington 17–10)

Third quarter

- (10:40) ASU – Brandon Ruiz 41-yard field goal (Drive: 10 plays, 44 yards, 4:13; Washington 17–13)
- (7:17) WASH – Peyton Henry 29-yard field goal (Drive: 8 plays, 63 yards, 3:23; Washington 20–13)

Fourth quarter

- (10:59) WASH – Cade Otton 5-yard pass from Jake Browning, Peyton Henry kick (Drive: 8 plays, 67 yards, 4:42; Washington 27–13)
- (2:54) ASU – Manny Wilkins 1-yard run, Brandon Ruiz kick (Drive: 10 plays, 55 yards, 4:16; Washington 27–20)

| Statistics | ASU | WASH |
|---|---|---|
| First downs | 16 | 26 |
| Total yards | 268 | 373 |
| Rushing yards | 40–164 | 39–171 |
| Passing yards | 104 | 202 |
| Passing: Comp–Att–Int | 17–27–0 | 15–23–1 |
| Time of possession | 29:17 | 30:43 |

| Team | Category | Player | Statistics |
|---|---|---|---|
| Arizona State | Passing | Manny Wilkins | 17/27, 104 yards |
| Arizona State | Rushing | Eno Benjamin | 26 carries, 104 yards, TD |
| Arizona State | Receiving | Brandon Aiyuk | 3 receptions, 36 yards |
| Washington | Passing | Jake Browning | 15/22, 202 yards, 3 TD |
| Washington | Rushing | Myles Gaskin | 21 carries, 86 yards |
| Washington | Receiving | Aaron Fuller | 3 receptions, 50 yards, TD |

=== vs Oregon State ===
Oregon State Beavers (1–3) vs Arizona State Sun Devils (2–2) – Game summary

| Quarter | 1 | 2 | 3 | 4 | Total |
|---|---|---|---|---|---|
| Beavers | 0 | 17 | 7 | 0 | 24 |
| Sun Devils | 10 | 21 | 7 | 14 | 52 |

at Sun Devil Stadium • Tempe, AZ

- Date: September 29, 2018
- Game time: 7:00 p.m.
- Game weather: Mostly clear, 98 °F (37 °C)
- Game attendance: 51,447
- Referee: Mark Duddy
- TV announcers (Pac-12 Network): Roxy Bernstein (play-by-play), Anthony Herron (analyst), Lewis Johnson (sideline reporter)

Game information

First quarter

- (8:30) ASU – Brandon Ruiz 29-yard field goal (Drive: 15 plays, 64 yards, 6:30; Arizona State 3–0)
- (4:28) ASU – Eno Benjamin 44-yard run, Brandon Ruiz kick (Drive: 4 plays, 57 yards, 0:56; Arizona State 10–0)

Second quarter

- (14:53) ASU – Eno Benjamin 8-yard pass from Manny Wilkins, Brandon Ruiz kick (Drive: 10 plays, 62 yards, 2:43; Arizona State 17–0)
- (9:17) OSU – Jordan Choukair 36-yard field goal (Drive: 13 plays, 57 yards, 5:36; Arizona State 17–3)
- (7:49) ASU – Eno Benjamin 47-yard run, Brandon Ruiz kick (Drive: 4 plays, 75 yards, 1:28; Arizona State 24–3)
- (6:22) OSU – Jermar Jefferson 11-yard run, Jordan Choukair kick (Drive: 5 plays, 75 yards, 1:27; Arizona State 24–10)
- (1:02) OSU – Jermar Jefferson 27-yard run, Jordan Choukair kick (Drive: 11 plays, 89 yards, 3:32; Arizona State 24–17)
- (0:14) ASU – Kyle Williams 19-yard pass from Manny Wilkins, Brandon Ruiz kick (Drive: 7 plays, 75 yards, 0:48; Arizona State 31–17)

Third quarter

- (11:13) ASU – N'Keal Harry 6-yard run, Brandon Ruiz kick (Drive: 5 plays, 51 yards, 2:10; Arizona State 38–17)
- (7:38) OSU – Noah Togiai 4-yard pass from Conor Blount, Jordan Choukair kick (Drive: 9 plays, 75 yards, 3:35; Arizona State 38–24)

Fourth quarter

- (9:48) ASU – Eno Benjamin 10-yard run, Brandon Ruiz kick (Drive: 11 plays, 94 yards, 5:22; Arizona State 45–24)
- (3:28) ASU – N'Keal Harry 41-yard pass from Manny Wilkins, Brandon Ruiz kick (Drive: 5 plays, 68 yards, 3:17; Arizona State 52–24)

| Statistics | OSU | ASU |
|---|---|---|
| First downs | 24 | 28 |
| Total yards | 406 | 558 |
| Rushing yards | 53–261 | 48–396 |
| Passing yards | 145 | 162 |
| Passing: Comp–Att–Int | 14–24–0 | 14–25–0 |
| Time of possession | 30:31 | 29:29 |

| Team | Category | Player | Statistics |
|---|---|---|---|
| Oregon State | Passing | Conor Blount | 14/23, 145 yards, TD |
| Oregon State | Rushing | Jermar Jefferson | 31 carries, 254 yards, 2 TD |
| Oregon State | Receiving | Timmy Hernandez | 7 receptions, 61 yards |
| Arizona State | Passing | Manny Wilkins | 14/25, 162 yards, 3 TD |
| Arizona State | Rushing | Eno Benjamin | 30 carries, 312 yards, 3 TD |
| Arizona State | Receiving | N'Keal Harry | 5 receptions, 84 yards, TD |

=== at No. 21 Colorado ===
Arizona State Sun Devils (3–2) at No. 21 Colorado Buffaloes (4–0) – Game summary

| Quarter | 1 | 2 | 3 | 4 | Total |
|---|---|---|---|---|---|
| Sun Devils | 7 | 7 | 7 | 0 | 21 |
| No. 21 Buffaloes | 7 | 7 | 14 | 0 | 28 |

at Folsom Field • Boulder, CO

- Date: October 6, 2018
- Game time: 1:00 p.m.
- Game weather: Mostly Cloudy, 50 °F (10 °C)
- Game attendance: 52,681
- Referee: Jay Edwards
- TV announcers (Pac-12 Network): Roxy Bernstein (play-by-play), Anthony Herron (analyst), Lewis Johnson (sideline reporter)

Game information

First quarter

- (5:47) ASU – Eno Benjamin 1-yard run, Brandon Ruiz kick (Drive: 13 plays, 86 yards, 6:33; Arizona State 7–0)
- (2:52) COLO – Laviska Shenault 1-yard run, James Stefanou kick (Drive: 8 plays, 73 yards, 2:55; Tied 7–7)

Second quarter

- (5:45) ASU – Eno Benjamin 1-yard run, Brandon Ruiz kick (Drive: 13 plays, 79 yards, 5:03; Arizona State 14–7)
- (0:24) COLO – Laviska Shenault 3-yard pass from Steven Montez, James Stefanou kick (Drive: 13 plays, 84 yards, 5:15; Tied 14–14)

Third quarter

- (13:35) ASU – Frank Darby 40-yard pass from Manny Wilkins, Brandon Ruiz kick (Drive: 4 plays, 75 yards, 1:25; Arizona State 21–14)
- (11:46) COLO – Laviska Shenault 30-yard pass from Steven Montez, James Stefanou kick (Drive: 5 plays, 75 yards, 1:49; Tied 21–21)
- (0:42) COLO – Laviska Shenault 1-yard run, James Stefanou kick (Drive: 7 plays, 80 yards, 2:31; Colorado 28–21)

Fourth quarter

- No scoring plays

| Statistics | ASU | COLO |
|---|---|---|
| First downs | 18 | 25 |
| Total yards | 367 | 494 |
| Rushing yards | 39–145 | 45–166 |
| Passing yards | 222 | 328 |
| Passing: Comp–Att–Int | 12–18–0 | 24–33–0 |
| Time of possession | 26:33 | 33:27 |

| Team | Category | Player | Statistics |
|---|---|---|---|
| Arizona State | Passing | Manny Wilkins | 14/18, 25 yards, INT |
| Arizona State | Rushing | Eno Benjamin | 28 carries, 120 yards, 2 TD |
| Arizona State | Receiving | Frank Darby | 3 receptions, 131 yards, TD |
| Colorado | Passing | Steven Montez | 24/33, 328 yards, 2 TD |
| Colorado | Rushing | Travon McMillan | 30 carries, 136 yards |
| Colorado | Receiving | Laviska Shenault | 13 receptions, 127 yards, 2 TD |

=== vs Stanford ===
Stanford Cardinal (4–2) vs Arizona State Sun Devils (3–3) – Game summary

| Quarter | 1 | 2 | 3 | 4 | Total |
|---|---|---|---|---|---|
| Cardinal | 0 | 6 | 14 | 0 | 20 |
| Sun Devils | 3 | 0 | 3 | 7 | 13 |

at Sun Devil Stadium • Tempe, AZ

- Date: October 18, 2018
- Game time: 6:00 p.m.
- Game weather: Partly cloudy, 79 °F (26 °C)
- Game attendance: 42,946
- Referee: Michael Mothershed
- TV announcers (ESPN): Dave Flemming (play-by-play), Brock Huard (analyst), Laura Rutledge (sideline reporter)

Game information

First quarter

- (0:27) ASU – Brandon Ruiz 34-yard field goal (Drive: 8 plays, 66 yards, 1:57; Arizona State 3–0)

Second quarter

- (3:40) STAN – Jet Toner 21-yard field goal (Drive: 8 plays, 63 yards, 4:43; Tied 3–3)
- (0:00) STAN – Jet Toner 31-yard field goal (Drive: 12 plays, 76 yards, 2:05; Stanford 6–3)

Third quarter

- (11:58) ASU – Brandon Ruiz 24-yard field goal (Drive: 8 plays, 59 yards, 3:02; Tied 6–6)
- (7:55) STAN – J. J. Arcega-Whiteside 28-yard pass from K. J. Costello, Jet Toner kick (Drive: 8 plays, 75 yards, 4:03; Stanford 13–6)
- (2:45) STAN – Cameron Scarlett 1-yard run, Jet Toner kick (Drive: 7 plays, 80 yards, 3:45; Stanford 20–6)

Fourth quarter

- (7:50) ASU – Manny Wilkins 10-yard run, Brandon Ruiz kick (Drive: 6 plays, 64 yards, 1:44; Stanford 20–13)

| Statistics | STAN | ASU |
|---|---|---|
| First downs | 24 | 20 |
| Total yards | 358 | 437 |
| Rushing yards | 43–127 | 23–84 |
| Passing yards | 231 | 353 |
| Passing: Comp–Att–Int | 22–29–0 | 26–45–2 |
| Time of possession | 38:17 | 21:43 |

| Team | Category | Player | Statistics |
|---|---|---|---|
| Stanford | Passing | K. J. Costello | 22/29, 231 yards, TD |
| Stanford | Rushing | Cameron Scarlett | 9 carries, 54 yards, TD |
| Stanford | Receiving | J. J. Arcega-Whiteside | 7 receptions, 91 yards, TD |
| Arizona State | Passing | Manny Wilkins | 26/43, 353 yards, INT |
| Arizona State | Rushing | Manny Wilkins | 11 carries, 41 yards, TD |
| Arizona State | Receiving | N'Keal Harry | 8 receptions, 91 yards |

=== at USC ===
Arizona State Sun Devils (3–4) at USC Trojans (4–3) – Game summary

| Quarter | 1 | 2 | 3 | 4 | Total |
|---|---|---|---|---|---|
| Sun Devils | 14 | 10 | 7 | 7 | 38 |
| Trojans | 7 | 7 | 14 | 7 | 35 |

at Los Angeles Memorial Coliseum • Los Angeles, CA

- Date: October 27, 2018
- Game time: 12:30 p.m.
- Game weather: Sunny with clear skies, 82 °F (28 °C)
- Game attendance: 47,406
- Referee: Chris Coyte
- TV announcers (ABC/ESPN2): Adam Amin (play-by-play), Rod Gilmore (analyst), Quint Kessenich (sideline reporter)

Game information

First quarter

- (12:52) USC – Tyler Vaughns 82-yard punt return, Michael Brown kick (USC 7–0)
- (8:55) ASU – N'Keal Harry 44-yard pass from Manny Wilkins, Brandon Ruiz kick (Drive: 8 plays, 75 yards, 3:57; Tied 7–7)
- (6:22) ASU – Eno Benjamin 3-yard run, Brandon Ruiz kick (Drive: 2 plays, 3 yards, 0:42; Arizona State 14–7)

Second quarter

- (14:12) ASU – Brandon Ruiz 31-yard field goal (Drive: 9 plays, 74 yards, 3:46; Arizona State 17–7)
- (6:12) ASU – Eno Benjamin 49-yard run, Brandon Ruiz kick (Drive: 12 plays, 95 yards, 5:17; Arizona State 24–7)
- (0:13) USC – Michael Pittman 6-yard pass from Jack Sears, Michael Brown kick (Drive: 8 plays, 75 yards, 1:33; Arizona State 24–14)

Third quarter

- (10:49) USC – Velus Jones 8-yard run, Michael Brown kick (Drive: 9 plays, 87 yards, 4:03; Arizona State 24–21)
- (10:24) USC – Michael Pittman 36-yard pass from Tyler Vaughns, Michael Brown kick (Drive: 1 play, 36 yards, 0:09; USC 28–24)
- (2:54) ASU – N'Keal Harry 92-yard punt return, Brandon Ruiz kick (Arizona State 31–28)

Fourth quarter

- (1:23) ASU – Manny Wilkins 45-yard run, Brandon Ruiz kick (Drive: 5 plays, 66 yards, 2:30; Arizona State 38–28)
- (0:35) USC – Tyler Vaughns 48-yard pass from Jack Sears, Michael Brown kick (Drive: 5 plays, 65 yards, 0:48; Arizona State 38–35)

| Statistics | ASU | USC |
|---|---|---|
| First downs | 20 | 19 |
| Total yards | 449 | 420 |
| Rushing yards | 44–283 | 33–149 |
| Passing yards | 166 | 271 |
| Passing: Comp–Att–Int | 14–24–0 | 21–30–0 |
| Time of possession | 32:15 | 27:45 |

| Team | Category | Player | Statistics |
|---|---|---|---|
| Arizona State | Passing | Manny Wilkins | 14/22, 166 yards, TD |
| Arizona State | Rushing | Eno Benjamin | 29 carries, 185 yards, 2 TD |
| Arizona State | Receiving | N'Keal Harry | 4 receptions, 95 yards, TD |
| USC | Passing | Jack Sears | 20/28, 235 yards, 2 TD |
| USC | Rushing | Aca'Cedric Ware | 13 carries, 64 yards |
| USC | Receiving | Michael Pittman | 6 receptions, 90 yards, 2 TD |

=== vs No. 16 Utah ===
No. 16 Utah Utes (6–2) vs Arizona State Sun Devils (4–4) – Game summary

| Quarter | 1 | 2 | 3 | 4 | Total |
|---|---|---|---|---|---|
| No. 16 Utes | 7 | 10 | 3 | 0 | 20 |
| Sun Devils | 14 | 7 | 0 | 17 | 38 |

at Sun Devil Stadium • Tempe, AZ

- Date: November 3, 2018
- Game time: 1:00 p.m.
- Game weather: Clear skies, 79 °F (26 °C)
- Game attendance: 46,445
- Referee: Jay Navarro
- TV announcers (Pac-12 Network): Ted Robinson (play-by-play), Yogi Roth (analyst), Jill Savage (sideline reporter)

Game information

First quarter

- (10:12) ASU – Eno Benjamin 6-yard run, Brandon Ruiz kick (Drive: 11 plays, 75 yards 4:48; Arizona State 7–0)
- (5:09) ASU – N'Keal Harry 3-yard pass from Manny Wilkins, Brandon Ruiz kick (Drive: 7 plays, 53 yards, 3:13; Arizona State 14–0)
- (0:40) UTAH – Zack Moss 1-yard run, Matt Gay kick (Drive: 11 plays, 75 yards 4:29; Arizona State 14–7)

Second quarter

- (12:22) UTAH – Matt Gay 40-yard field goal (Drive: 5 plays, 21 yards, 1:44; Arizona State 14–10 )
- (2:15) UTAH – Samson Nacua 5-yard pass from Tyler Huntley, Matt Gay kick (Drive: 11 plays, 80 yards, 4:43; Utah 17–14)
- (1:01) ASU – N'Keal Harry 23-yard pass from Manny Wilkins, Brandon Ruiz kick (Drive: 6 plays, 77 yards, 1:07; Arizona State 21–17)

Third quarter

- (1:50) UTAH – Matt Gay 31-yard field goal (Drive: 8 plays, 49 yards, 3:51; Arizona State 21–20)

Fourth quarter

- (14:47) ASU – N'Keal Harry 61-yard pass from Manny Wilkins, Brandon Ruiz kick (Drive: 4 plays, 75 yards, 2:03; Arizona State 28–20)
- (10:27) ASU – Brandon Ruiz 21-yard field goal (Drive: 7 plays, 59 yards, 3:23; Arizona State 31–20)
- (4:12) ASU – Eno Benjamin 44-yard run, Brandon Ruiz kick (Drive: 8 plays, 74 yards, 5:21; Arizona State 38–20)

| Statistics | UTAH | ASU |
|---|---|---|
| First downs | 17 | 25 |
| Total yards | 325 | 536 |
| Rushing yards | 32–178 | 50–251 |
| Passing yards | 147 | 285 |
| Passing: Comp–Att–Int | 11–26–3 | 19–24–1 |
| Time of possession | 23:25 | 36:35 |

| Team | Category | Player | Statistics |
|---|---|---|---|
| Utah | Passing | Tyler Huntley | 7/15, 88 yards, TD, 2 INT |
| Utah | Rushing | Zack Moss | 18 carries, 128 yards, TD |
| Utah | Receiving | Samson Nacua | 4 receptions, 68 yards, TD |
| Arizona State | Passing | Manny Wilkins | 19/24, 285 yards, 3 TD, INT |
| Arizona State | Rushing | Eno Benjamin | 27 carries, 175 yards, 2 TD |
| Arizona State | Receiving | N'Keal Harry | 9 receptions, 161 yards, 3 TD |

=== vs UCLA ===
UCLA Bruins (2–7) vs Arizona State Sun Devils (5–4) – Game summary

| Quarter | 1 | 2 | 3 | 4 | Total |
|---|---|---|---|---|---|
| Bruins | 7 | 7 | 7 | 7 | 28 |
| Sun Devils | 3 | 14 | 7 | 7 | 31 |

at Sun Devil Stadium • Tempe, AZ

- Date: November 10, 2018
- Game time: 12:00 p.m.
- Game weather: Clear skies, 75 °F (24 °C)
- Game attendance: 46,466
- Referee: Kevin Mar
- TV announcers (Pac-12 Network): J.B. Long (play-by-play), Anthony Herron (analyst), Lewis Johnson (sideline reporter)

Game information

First quarter

- (9:16) ASU – Brandon Ruiz 34-yard field goal (Drive: 13 plays, 60 yards, 5:44; Arizona State 3–0)
- (6:13) UCLA – Joshua Kelley 2-yard run, JJ Molson kick (Drive: 7 plays, 75 yards, 3:03; UCLA 7–3)

Second quarter

- (10:09) ASU – Manny Wilkins 13-yard run, Brandon Ruiz kick (Drive: 7 plays, 85 yards, 2:54; Arizona State 10–7)
- (4:36) UCLA – Darnay Holmes 31-yard interception return, JJ Molson kick (UCLA 14–10)
- (0:58) ASU – Nick Ralston 5-yard pass from Manny Wilkins, Brandon Ruiz kick (Drive: 10 plays, 75 yards, 3:38; Arizona State 17–14)

Third quarter

- (8:13) ASU – Eno Benjamin 1-yard run, Brandon Ruiz kick (Drive: 7 plays, 76 yards, 2:34; Arizona State 24–14)
- (6:13) UCLA – Caleb Wilson 33-yard pass from Wilton Speight, JJ Molson kick (Drive: 6 plays, 75 yards, 2:00; Arizona State 24–21)

Fourth quarter

- (3:56) ASU – Manny Wilkins 1-yard run, Brandon Ruiz kick (Drive: 15 plays, 80 yards, 8:05; Arizona State 31–21)
- (1:57) UCLA – Caleb Wilson 10-yard pass from Wilton Speight, JJ Molson kick (Drive: 9 plays, 75 yards, 1:59; Arizona State 31–28)

| Statistics | UCLA | ASU |
|---|---|---|
| First downs | 24 | 29 |
| Total yards | 439 | 480 |
| Rushing yards | 29–104 | 59–281 |
| Passing yards | 335 | 199 |
| Passing: Comp–Att–Int | 26–35–1 | 16–22–1 |
| Time of possession | 23:50 | 36:10 |

| Team | Category | Player | Statistics |
|---|---|---|---|
| UCLA | Passing | Wilton Speight | 26/35, 335 yards, 2 TD, INT |
| UCLA | Rushing | Joshua Kelley | 21 carries, 79 yards, TD |
| UCLA | Receiving | Caleb Wilson | 11 receptions, 164 yards, 2 TD |
| Arizona State | Passing | Manny Wilkins | 16/22, 199 yards, TD, INT |
| Arizona State | Rushing | Eno Benjamin | 34 carries, 182 yards, TD |
| Arizona State | Receiving | N'Keal Harry | 7 receptions, 100 yards |

=== at Oregon ===
Arizona State Sun Devils (6–4) at Oregon Ducks (6–4) – Game summary

| Quarter | 1 | 2 | 3 | 4 | Total |
|---|---|---|---|---|---|
| Sun Devils | 3 | 10 | 3 | 13 | 29 |
| Ducks | 7 | 21 | 0 | 3 | 31 |

at Autzen Stadium • Eugene, OR

- Date: November 17, 2018
- Game time: 8:30 p.m.
- Game weather: Clear, 46 °F (8 °C)
- Game attendance: 50,485
- Referee: Jay Edwards
- TV announcers (Pac-12 Network): Roxy Bernstein (play-by-play), Anthony Herron (analyst), Lewis Johnson (sideline reporter)

Game information

First quarter

- (11:24) ORE – CJ Verdell 6-yard run, Adam Stack kick (Drive: 9 plays, 78 yards, 3:36; Oregon 7–0)
- (6:09) ASU – Brandon Ruiz 38-yard field goal (Drive: 10 plays, 55 yards, 5:15; Oregon 7–3)

Second quarter

- (14:04) ORE – CJ Verdell 18-yard pass from Justin Herbert, Adam Stack kick (Drive: 9 plays, 83 yards, 2:49; Oregon 14–3)
- (8:29) ASU – Brandon Ruiz 30-yard field goal (Drive: 7 plays, 39 yards, 2:31; Oregon 14–6)
- (4:03) ORE – Dillon Mitchell 57-yard pass from Justin Herbert, Adam Stack kick (Drive: 4 plays, 75 yards, 1:20; Oregon 21–6)
- (0:50) ASU – Frank Darby 22-yard pass from Manny Wilkins, Brandon Ruiz kick (Drive: 1 play, 22 yards, 0:06; Oregon 21–13)
- (0:11) ORE – Jaylon Redd 8-yard run, Adam Stack kick (Drive: 5 plays, 71 yards, 0:39; Oregon 28–13)

Third quarter

- (3:38) ASU – Brandon Ruiz 29-yard field goal (Drive: 8 plays, 51 yards, 3:27; Oregon 28–16)

Fourth quarter

- (11:01) ASU – Brandon Aiyuk 25-yard pass from Manny Wilkins, Brandon Ruiz kick (Drive: 7 plays, 47 yards, 3:04; Oregon 28–23)
- (9:06) ORE – Adam Stack 28-yard field goal (Drive: 6 plays, 29 yards, 1:55; Oregon 31–23)
- (4:35) ASU – Manny Wilkins 1-yard run, two-point pass failed (Drive: 10 plays, 75 yards, 4:31; Oregon 31–29)

| Statistics | ASU | ORE |
|---|---|---|
| First downs | 16 | 21 |
| Total yards | 324 | 449 |
| Rushing yards | 41–142 | 41–187 |
| Passing yards | 182 | 262 |
| Passing: Comp–Att–Int | 15–32–0 | 19–34–2 |
| Time of possession | 33:29 | 26:31 |

| Team | Category | Player | Statistics |
|---|---|---|---|
| Arizona State | Passing | Manny Wilkins | 15/32, 182 yards, 2 TD |
| Arizona State | Rushing | Eno Benjamin | 29 carries, 149 yards |
| Arizona State | Receiving | N'Keal Harry | 7 receptions, 105 yards |
| Oregon | Passing | Justin Herbert | 19/34, 262 yards, 2 TD, 2 INT |
| Oregon | Rushing | Travis Dye | 18 carries, 105 yards |
| Oregon | Receiving | Dillon Mitchell | 4 receptions, 103 yards, TD |

=== at Arizona ===
Arizona State Sun Devils (6–5) at Arizona Wildcats (5–6) – Game summary

| Quarter | 1 | 2 | 3 | 4 | Total |
|---|---|---|---|---|---|
| Sun Devils | 7 | 7 | 7 | 20 | 41 |
| Wildcats | 10 | 12 | 18 | 0 | 40 |

at Arizona Stadium • Tucson, AZ

- Date: November 24, 2018
- Game time: 1:30 p.m.
- Game weather: Clear, 69 °F (21 °C)
- Game attendance: 51,805
- Referee: Chris Coyte
- TV announcers (FS1): Chris Vosters (play-by-play), Petros Papadakis (analyst)

Game information

First quarter

- (7:06) ARIZ – Josh Pollack 29-yard field goal (Drive: 9 plays, 86 yards, 3:47; Arizona 3–0)
- (3:33) ARIZ – Tony Ellison 28-yard pass from Khalil Tate, Josh Pollack kick (Drive: 6 plays, 78 yards, 1:45; Arizona 10–0)
- (2:28) ASU – Brandon Aiyuk 58-yard pass from Manny Wilkins, Brandon Ruiz kick (Drive: 3 plays, 75 yards, 1:05; Arizona 10–7)

Second quarter

- (10:18) ARIZ – Josh Pollack 23-yard field goal (Drive: 5 plays, 21 yards, 2:21; Arizona 13–7)
- (4:25) ARIZ – Shawn Poindexter 23-yard pass from Khalil Tate, two-point run failed (Drive: 9 plays, 70 yards, 4:13; Arizona 19–7)
- (1:27) ASU – Eno Benjamin 10-yard run, Brandon Ruiz kick (Drive: 9 plays, 75 yards, 2:58; Arizona 19–14)
- (0:00) ARIZ – Josh Pollack 36-yard field goal (Drive: 6 plays, 44 yards, 1:18; Arizona 22–14)

Third quarter

- (13:14) ARIZ – Team safety (Arizona 24–14)
- (12:17) ARIZ – Josh Pollack 40-yard field goal (Drive: 4 plays, 3 yards, 0:46; Arizona 27–14)
- (9:23) ASU – Eno Benjamin 14-yard run, Brandon Ruiz kick (Drive: 5 plays, 65 yards, 2:54; Arizona 27–21)
- (7:51) ARIZ – Gary Brightwell 35-yard run, two-point pass failed (Drive: 4 plays, 75 yards, 1:32; Arizona 33–21)
- (2:44) ARIZ – Tony Ellison 8-yard pass from Khalil Tate, Josh Pollack kick (Drive: 9 plays, 58 yards, 3:26; Arizona 40–21)

Fourth quarter

- (13:05) ASU – Brandon Ruiz 27-yard field goal (Drive: 12 plays, 66 yards, 4:39; Arizona 40–24)
- (6:36) ASU – Manny Wilkins 11-yard run, Manny Wilkins two-point pass to Tommy Hudson (Drive: 8 plays, 80 yards, 2:25; Arizona 40–32)
- (3:33) ASU – Brandon Ruiz 39-yard field goal (Drive: 4 plays, 1 yard, 1:26; Arizona 40–35)
- (3:08) ASU – Eno Benjamin 22-yard run, two-point pass failed (Drive: 1 play, 22 yards, 0:07; Arizona State 41–40)

| Statistics | ASU | ARIZ |
|---|---|---|
| First downs | 20 | 26 |
| Total yards | 401 | 520 |
| Rushing yards | 31–136 | 44–238 |
| Passing yards | 265 | 282 |
| Passing: Comp–Att–Int | 18–31–0 | 21–39–1 |
| Time of possession | 27:43 | 32:17 |

| Team | Category | Player | Statistics |
|---|---|---|---|
| Arizona State | Passing | Manny Wilkins | 18/31, 265 yards, TD |
| Arizona State | Rushing | Eno Benjamin | 21 carries, 80 yards, 3 TD |
| Arizona State | Receiving | Brandon Aiyuk | 5 receptions, 106 yards, TD |
| Arizona | Passing | Khalil Tate | 21/39, 282 yards, 3 TD, INT |
| Arizona | Rushing | J. J. Taylor | 28 carries, 144 yards |
| Arizona | Receiving | Shawn Poindexter | 6 receptions, 99 yards, TD |

=== vs No. 19 Fresno State (Las Vegas Bowl) ===
Arizona State Sun Devils (7–5) vs No. 19 Fresno State Bulldogs (11–2) – Game summary
(2018 Mitsubishi Motors Las Vegas Bowl)

| Quarter | 1 | 2 | 3 | 4 | Total |
|---|---|---|---|---|---|
| Sun Devils | 7 | 10 | 3 | 0 | 20 |
| No. 19 Bulldogs | 10 | 7 | 7 | 7 | 31 |

at Sam Boyd Stadium • Whitney, NV

- Date: December 15, 2018
- Game time: 1:30 p.m.
- Game weather: Sunny with blue sky, 61 °F (16 °C)
- Game attendance: 37,146
- Referee: Charles Lamertina
- TV announcers (ABC): Rece Davis (play-by-play), Kirk Herbstreit (analyst), Laura Rutledge (sideline reporter)

Game information

First Quarter

- (7:02) FRES – Asa Fuller 39-yard field goal (Drive: 7 plays, 45 yards, 2:43; Fresno State 3–0)
- (4:58) FRES – Anthoula Kelly 70-yard interception return, Asa Fuller kick (Fresno State 10–0)
- (1:25) ASU – Kyle Williams 3-yard pass from Manny Wilkins, Brandon Ruiz kick (Drive: 9 plays, 65 yards, 3:24; Fresno State 10–7)

Second Quarter

- (12:43) ASU – Eno Benjamin 17-yard run, Brandon Ruiz kick (Drive: 8 plays, 58 yards, 2:28; Arizona State 14–10)
- (8:03) FRES – Marcus McMaryion 10-yard run, Asa Fuller kick (Drive: 9 plays, 75 yards, 4:40; Fresno State 17–14)
- (0:51) ASU – Brandon Ruiz 20-yard field goal (Drive: 17 plays, 72 yards, 7:05; Tied 17–17)

Third Quarter

- (5:33) ASU – Brandon Ruiz 44-yard field goal (Drive: 7 plays, 13 yards, 4:04; Arizona State 20–17)
- (1:00) FRES – Ronnie Rivers 68-yard run, Asa Fuller kick (Drive: 4 plays, 80 yards, 0:53; Fresno State 24–20)

Fourth Quarter

- (5:19) FRES – Ronnie Rivers 5-yard run, Asa Fuller kick (Drive: 7 plays, 55 yards, 3:19; Fresno State 31–20)

| Statistics | ASU | FRES |
|---|---|---|
| First downs | 18 | 18 |
| Total yards | 293 | 436 |
| Rushing yards | 38–164 | 35–260 |
| Passing yards | 129 | 176 |
| Passing: Comp–Att–Int | 19–31–2 | 15–29–2 |
| Time of possession | 31:01 | 28:59 |

| Team | Category | Player | Statistics |
|---|---|---|---|
| Arizona State | Passing | Manny Wilkins | 19/31, 129 yards, TD, 2 INT |
| Arizona State | Rushing | Eno Benjamin | 23 carries, 118 yards, TD |
| Arizona State | Receiving | Brandon Aiyuk | 9 receptions, 61 yards |
| Fresno State | Passing | Marcus McMaryion | 15/29, 176 yards, 2 INT |
| Fresno State | Rushing | Ronnie Rivers | 24 carries, 212 yards, 2 TD |
| Fresno State | Receiving | Dejonte O'Neal | 2 receptions, 42 yards |

Fresno State running back Ronnie Rivers was named MVP.

== Awards ==
Pac-12 Freshman Defensive Player of the Year: Merlin Robertson

== Players drafted into the NFL ==
| Round | Pick | Player | Position | NFL club |
|---|---|---|---|---|
| 1 | 32 | N'Keal Harry | WR | New England Patriots |
| 4 | 125 | Renell Wren | DT | Cincinnati Bengals |
