= 2018 Fresno State Bulldogs football team =

American college football season

2018 Fresno State Bulldogs football

Mountain West champion MW West Division champion Las Vegas Bowl champion

MW Championship Game, W 19–16 ^{OT} vs. Boise State

Las Vegas Bowl, W 31–20 vs. Arizona State
- Conference: Mountain West Conference
- West Division

Ranking
- Coaches: No. 18
- AP: No. 18
- Record: 12–2 (7–1 MW)
- Head coach: Jeff Tedford (2nd season)
- Offensive coordinator: Kalen DeBoer (2nd season)
- Offensive scheme: Pro-style
- Defensive coordinator: Bert Watts (1st season)
- Base defense: 4–3
- Home stadium: Bulldog Stadium

2018 Mountain West Conference football standings
	Conf.			Overall
Team	W		L	W		L
Mountain Division
No. 23 Boise State x	7	–	1	10	–	3
No. 22 Utah State	7	–	1	11	–	2
Wyoming	4	–	4	6	–	6
Air Force	3	–	5	5	–	7
Colorado State	2	–	6	3	–	9
New Mexico	1	–	7	3	–	9
West Division
No. 18 Fresno State x$	7	–	1	12	–	2
Nevada	5	–	3	8	–	5
Hawaii	5	–	3	8	–	6
San Diego State	4	–	4	7	–	6
UNLV	2	–	6	4	–	8
San Jose State	1	–	7	1	–	11
Championship: Fresno State 19, Boise State 16 (OT)
$ – Conference champion; x – Division champion/co-champions; y – Championship game participant; Rankings from AP Poll

The 2018 Fresno State Bulldogs football team represented California State University, Fresno in the 2018 NCAA Division I FBS football season. The Bulldogs were led by second-year head coach Jeff Tedford and played their home games at Bulldog Stadium. They were a member of the Mountain West Conference in the West Division.

In one of the best seasons in program history, the Bulldogs finished the season 12–2, 7–1 in Mountain West play, to be champions of their conference's West Division. They represented the West Division in the Mountain West Championship Game, where they defeated Boise State to become Mountain West champions. They were invited to the Las Vegas Bowl where they defeated Arizona State. Their 12 wins were the most wins in a single season in school history.

== Recruiting ==
=== Recruits ===
The Bulldogs signed a total of 17 recruits.

College recruiting (2018)
Name	Hometown	School	Height	Weight	Commit date
Nick Abbs; OT	Fresno, California	Fresno City College	6 ft 4 in (1.93 m)	280 lb (130 kg)	Oct 19, 2017
Nick Abbs; OT	Recruit ratings: Scout: Rivals: 247Sports:				
Ricardo Arias; WR	Fresno, California	McLane High School	6 ft 2 in (1.88 m)	190 lb (86 kg)	Jul 14, 2017
Ricardo Arias; WR	Recruit ratings: Scout: Rivals: 247Sports:				
Elijah Carson; OT	San Diego, California	Morse High School	6 ft 7 in (2.01 m)	290 lb (130 kg)	Dec 20, 2017
Elijah Carson; OT	Recruit ratings: Scout: Rivals: 247Sports:				
Steven Comstock; QB	Covina, California	Northview High School	6 ft 1 in (1.85 m)	180 lb (82 kg)	Jun 24, 2017
Steven Comstock; QB	Recruit ratings: Scout: Rivals: 247Sports:				
Shawn Dourseau; S	Perris, California	Citrus Hill High School	5 ft 11 in (1.80 m)	175 lb (79 kg)	Jan 22, 2018
Shawn Dourseau; S	Recruit ratings: Scout: Rivals: 247Sports:				
Emoryie Edwards; WR	Tulare, California	Tulare Union High School	6 ft 0 in (1.83 m)	184 lb (83 kg)	Jun 26, 2017
Emoryie Edwards; WR	Recruit ratings: Scout: Rivals: 247Sports:				
Isaiah Johnson; WR	Modesto, California	Thomas Downey High School	6 ft 3 in (1.91 m)	205 lb (93 kg)	Feb 9, 2018
Isaiah Johnson; WR	Recruit ratings: Scout: Rivals: 247Sports: ESPN:				
Sherwin King; S	Fresno, California	Sunnyside High School	6 ft 1 in (1.85 m)	205 lb (93 kg)	Jul 14, 2017
Sherwin King; S	Recruit ratings: Scout: Rivals: 247Sports:				
Matt Kjeldgaard; DT	Oakdale, California	Oakdale High School	6 ft 2 in (1.88 m)	270 lb (120 kg)	Jul 14, 2017
Matt Kjeldgaard; DT	Recruit ratings: Scout: Rivals: 247Sports:				
Matthew Lawson; DT	Ontario, California	Colony High School	6 ft 1 in (1.85 m)	290 lb (130 kg)	Dec 14, 2017
Matthew Lawson; DT	Recruit ratings: Scout: Rivals: 247Sports:				
Leonard Payne; DT	Los Angeles, California	Salesian High School	6 ft 3 in (1.91 m)	270 lb (120 kg)	Dec 17, 2017
Leonard Payne; DT	Recruit ratings: Scout: Rivals: 247Sports:				
Deshawn Ruffin; CB	Fresno, California	Sunnyside High School	5 ft 9 in (1.75 m)	160 lb (73 kg)	Jul 14, 2017
Deshawn Ruffin; CB	Recruit ratings: Scout: Rivals: 247Sports:				
Tyrone Sampson Jr. OC	Detroit, Michigan	East English Village Preparatory Academy	6 ft 3 in (1.91 m)	330 lb (150 kg)	Feb 16, 2018
Tyrone Sampson Jr. OC	Recruit ratings: Scout: Rivals: 247Sports: ESPN:				
Clive Truschel; OG	Clovis, California	Clovis West High School	6 ft 3 in (1.91 m)	295 lb (134 kg)	Dec 20, 2017
Clive Truschel; OG	Recruit ratings: Scout: Rivals: 247Sports:				
Shamar Whestone; CB	Upland, California	Upland High School	5 ft 11 in (1.80 m)	190 lb (86 kg)	Apr 30, 2017
Shamar Whestone; CB	Recruit ratings: Scout: Rivals: 247Sports:				
Ben Wooldridge; QB	Pleasanton, California	Foothill High School	6 ft 3 in (1.91 m)	185 lb (84 kg)	Jun 26, 2017
Ben Wooldridge; QB	Recruit ratings: Scout: Rivals: 247Sports:				
Rodney Wright; WR	Fresno, California	Clovis West High School	5 ft 10 in (1.78 m)	170 lb (77 kg)	Dec 11, 2017
Rodney Wright; WR	Recruit ratings: Scout: Rivals: 247Sports:				
Overall recruit ranking:
Note: In many cases, Scout, Rivals, 247Sports, On3, and ESPN may conflict in their listings of height and weight.; In these cases, the average was taken. ESPN grades are on a 100-point scale.; Sources: "Fresno State Football Commitments". Rivals.; "2018 Team Ranking". Rivals.com.

== Preseason ==
=== Award watch lists ===
Listed in the order that they were released

Award	Player	Position	Year
Chuck Bednarik Award	Jeffrey Allison	LB	JR
Maxwell Award	Marcus McMaryion	QB	SR
Fred Biletnikoff Award	KeeSean Johnson	WR	SR
John Mackey Award	Jared Rice	TE	JR
Butkus Award	Jeffrey Allison	LB	JR
Wuerffel Trophy	Marcus McMaryion	QB	SR
Johnny Unitas Golden Arm Award	Marcus McMaryion	QB	SR

=== Mountain West media days ===
During the Mountain West media days held July 24–25 at the Cosmopolitan on the Las Vegas Strip, the Bulldogs were predicted as favorites to win the West Division title.

==== Preseason All-Mountain West Team ====
The Bulldogs had two players selected to the preseason all-Mountain West team.

Offense

KeeSean Johnson – WR

Defense

Jeffrey Allison – LB

== Schedule ==
Date	Time	Opponent	Rank	Site	TV	Result	Attendance
September 1	7:00 p.m.	Idaho*		Bulldog Stadium; Fresno, CA	Stadium	W 79–13	31,170
September 8	4:30 p.m.	at Minnesota*		TCF Bank Stadium; Minneapolis, MN	FS1	L 14–21	38,280
September 15	7:30 p.m.	at UCLA*		Rose Bowl; Pasadena, CA	FS1	W 38–14	60,867
September 29	7:30 p.m.	Toledo*		Bulldog Stadium; Fresno, CA	ESPNU	W 49–27	33,401
October 6	7:30 p.m.	at Nevada		Mackay Stadium; Reno, NV	ESPNU	W 21–3	15,367
October 13	7:30 p.m.	Wyoming		Bulldog Stadium; Fresno, CA	ESPNU	W 27–3	28,501
October 20	4:30 p.m.	at New Mexico		Dreamstyle Stadium; Albuquerque, NM	ESPNU	W 38–7	16,708
October 27	7:30 p.m.	Hawaii^{†}		Bulldog Stadium; Fresno, CA (rivalry)	ESPN2	W 50–20	33,659
November 3	7:30 p.m.	at UNLV	No. 23	Sam Boyd Stadium; Whitney, NV	CBSSN	W 48–3	15,276
November 9	7:15 p.m.	at Boise State	No. 23	Albertsons Stadium; Boise, ID (Battle for the Milk Can)	ESPN2	L 17–24	33,118
November 17	7:30 p.m.	San Diego State		Bulldog Stadium; Fresno, CA (Battle for the Oil Can)	CBSSN	W 23–14	36,123
November 24	4:00 p.m.	San Jose State		Bulldog Stadium; Fresno, CA (Valley Cup)	ESPNU	W 31–13	26,162
December 1	4:45 p.m.	at No. 22 Boise State	No. 25	Albertsons Stadium; Boise, ID (MW Championship Game)	ESPN	W 19–16 ^{OT}	23,662
December 15	12:30 p.m.	vs. Arizona State*	No. 21	Sam Boyd Stadium; Whitney, NV (Las Vegas Bowl)	ABC	W 31–20	37,146
*Non-conference game; ^{†}Homecoming; Rankings from AP Poll and CFP Rankings after October 30 released prior to game; All times are in Pacific time

== Game summaries ==
=== Idaho ===
Idaho Vandals at Fresno State Bulldogs

Quarter	1	2	3	4	Total
Vandals	6	0	7	0	13
Bulldogs	16	28	14	21	79

at Bulldog Stadium, Fresno, California

- Date: September 1, 2018
- Game time: 7:06 p.m. PDT
- Game weather: Clear, 88 °F (31 °C)
- Game attendance: 31,170
- Referee: Kelly Holman
- TV announcers (Stadium): Dan Hellie, David Carr, and Kelli Johnson
- Mims has 3 of Fresno State's 7 rushing TDs in win over Idaho, Game Book

Game information

First Quarter

- 8:45 FRES – Jordan Mims 1-yard run (Asa Fuller kick), Bulldogs 7–0. Drive: 11 plays, 56 yards, TOP 4:21
- 2:05 FRES – Dejonte O'Neal 26-yard run (Asa Fuller PAT failed), Bulldogs 13–0. Drive: 12 plays, 80 yards, TOP 5:04
- 0:43 FRES – Asa Fuller 33-yard field goal, Bulldogs 16–0. Drive: 4 plays, 4 yards, TOP 1:18
- 0:05 IDHO – Jeff Cotton 73-yard pass from Colton Richardson (Cade Coffey PAT failed), Bulldogs 16–6. Drive: 2 plays, 75 yards, TOP 0:00

Second Quarter

- 12:42 FRES – Jordan Mims 12-yard run (Asa Fuller kick), Bulldogs 23–6. Drive: 7 plays, 75 yards, TOP 2:23
- 9:20 FRES – Jaron Bryant 74-yard return of blocked field goal (Asa Fuller kick), Bulldogs 30–6. Drive: 10 plays, 46 yards, TOP 3:22
- 2:58 FRES – Anthoula Kelly 39-yard interception return (Asa Fuller kick), Bulldogs 37–6. Drive: 2 plays, 2 yards, TOP 0:00
- 0:00 FRES – Jaron Bryant 71-yard return of blocked field goal (Asa Fuller kick), Bulldogs 44–6. Drive: 9 plays, 43 yards, TOP 2:48

Third Quarter

- 9:14 FRES – Jordan Mims 2-yard run (Asa Fuller kick), Bulldogs 51–6. Drive: 12 plays, 93 yards, TOP 5:46
- 7:15 FRES – Derrion Grim 33-yard pass from Jorge Reyna (Asa Fuller kick), Bulldogs 58–6. Drive: 2 plays, 40 yards, TOP 0:00
- 0:31 IDHO – Isaiah Saunders 6-yard run (Cade Coffey kick), Bulldogs 58–13. Drive: 15 plays, 75 yards, TOP 6:44

Fourth Quarter

- 10:50 FRES – Saevion Johnson 5-yard run (Asa Fuller kick), Bulldogs 65–13. Drive: 1 play, 5 yards, TOP 0:00
- 6:19 FRES – Romello Harris 27-yard run (Asa Fuller kick), Bulldogs 72–13. Drive: 3 plays, 45 yards, TOP 1:34
- 2:40 FRES – Saevion Johnson 1-yard run (Asa Fuller kick), Bulldogs 79–13. Drive: 6 plays, 35 yards, TOP 3:34

Passing

- IDHO – Colton Richardson, 3–10, 106 yards, 1 TD, 2 INT
- FRES – Marcus McMaryion, 19–26, 207 yards

Rushing

- IDHO – Isaiah Saunders, 24 carries, 89 yards, 1 TD
- FRES – Romello Harris, 4 carries, 47 yards, 1 TD

Receiving

- IDHO – Jeff Cotton, 4 receptions, 96 yards, 1 TD
- FRES – KeeSean Johnson, 6 receptions, 118 yards

Junior defensive back Jaron Bryant was named the Mountain West Special Teams Player of the Week after returning two blocked field goals for touchdowns.

=== At Minnesota ===
Fresno State Bulldogs at Minnesota Golden Gophers

Quarter	1	2	3	4	Total
Bulldogs	0	0	7	7	14
Golden Gophers	7	3	0	11	21

at TCF Bank Stadium, Minneapolis

- Date: September 8, 2018
- Game time: 6:40 p.m. CDT
- Game weather: Clear, 72 °F (22 °C)
- Game attendance: 38,280
- Referee: Mark Kluczynski
- TV announcers (FS1): Eric Collins and Ben Leber
- Winfield's late pick helps Minnesota beat Fresno St. 21–14, Game Book

Game information

First Quarter

- MINN – Seth Green 1-yard run (Emmit Carpenter Kick), 2:46. Golden Gophers 7–0. Drive: 14 plays, 80 yards, 7:17.

Second Quarter

- MINN – Emmit Carpenter 53-yard field goal, 0:58. Golden Gophers 10–0. Drive: 9 plays, 55 yards, 4:25.

Third Quarter

- FRES – Jared Rice 1-yard pass from Marcus McMaryion (Asa Fuller Kick), 0:20. Golden Gophers 10–7. Drive: 4 plays, 17 yards. 1:13.

Fourth Quarter

- MINN – Emmit Carpenter 50-yard field goal, 9:43. Golden Gophers 13–7. Drive: 10 plays, 48 yard, 5:37.
- FRES – KeeSean Johnson 45-yard pass from Marcus McMaryion (Asa Fuller Kick), 8:20. Bulldogs 14–13. Drive: 5 plays, 75 yards, 1:23.
- MINN – Seth Green 3-yard run (Two-point conversion), 3:28. Golden Gophers 21–14. Drive: 10 plays, 74 yards, 4:52.

Passing

- FRES – Marcus McMaryion – 23/32, 205 yards, 2 TD, 1 INT
- MINN – Zack Annexstad – 16/26, 175 yards

Rushing

- FRES – Jordan Mims – 10 rushes, 41 yards
- MINN – Bryce Williams – 25 rushes, 87 yards

Receiving

- FRES – KeeSean Johnson – 6 receptions, 89 yards, 1 TD
- MINN – Rashod Bateman – 5 receptions, 78 yards

=== At UCLA ===
Fresno State Bulldogs at UCLA Bruins

Quarter	1	2	3	4	Total
Bulldogs	13	3	15	7	38
Bruins	0	7	7	0	14

at Rose Bowl, Pasadena, California

- Date: September 15, 2018
- Game time: 7:35 p.m. PDT
- Game weather: Clear, 79 °F (26 °C)
- Game attendance: 60,867
- Referee: Mark Duddy
- TV announcers (FS1): Justin Kutcher, DeMarco Murray, and Petros Papadakis
- McMaryion scores 4 touchdowns to lead Fresno State over UCLA, Game Book

Game information

First Quarter

- FRES – Marcus McMaryion 1-yard run, 10:03. Bulldogs 6–0. Drive: 13 plays, 75 yards, 4:57.
- FRES – Kyle Riddering 10-yard pass from Marcus McMaryion (Asa Fuller Kick), 3:41. Bulldogs 13–0. Drive: 8 plays, 75 yards, 3:52.

Second Quarter

- FRES – Asa Fuller 28-yard field goal, 14:17. Bulldogs 16–0. Drive: 6 plays, 27 yards, 2:02.
- UCLA – Theo Howard 45-yard pass from Dorian Thompson-Robinson (J.J. Molson Kick), 9:44. Bulldogs 16–7. Drive: 5 plays, 43 yards, 1:38.

Third Quarter

- UCLA – Bolo Olorunfunmi 2-yard run (J.J. Molson Kick), 12:59. Bulldogs 16–14. Drive: 3 plays, 17 yards, 1:09.
- FRES – Marcus McMaryion 1-yard run (Two-point conversion), 6:29. Bulldogs 24–14. Drive: 8 plays, 73 yards, 3:16.
- FRES – Marcus McMaryion 1-yard run (Asa Fuller Kick), 3:43. Bulldogs 31–14. Drive: 5 plays, 51 yards, 2:20.

Fourth Quarter

- FRES – Marcus McMaryion 2-yard run (Asa Fuller Kick), 13:04. Bulldogs 38–14. Drive: 7 plays, 55 yards, 3:12.

Passing

- FRES – Marcus McMaryion – 22/33, 270 yards, 1 TD
- UCLA – Dorian Thompson-Robinson – 10/24, 151 yards, 1 TD, 2 INT

Rushing

- FRES – Jordan Mims – 21 rushes, 85 yards
- UCLA – Dorian Thompson-Robinson – 8 rushes, 49 yards

Receiving

- FRES – KeeSean Johnson – 8 receptions, 85 yards
- UCLA – Theo Howard – 4 receptions, 80 yards, 1 TD

=== Toledo ===
Toledo Rockets at Fresno State Bulldogs

Quarter	1	2	3	4	Total
Rockets	7	6	0	14	27
Bulldogs	7	21	21	0	49

at Bulldog Stadium, Fresno, California

- Date: September 29, 2018
- Game time: 7:32 p.m. PDT
- Game weather: Clear, 74 °F (23 °C)
- Game attendance: 33,401
- Referee: Kevin Hassell
- TV announcers (ESPNU): Mike Couzens and Kirk Morrison
- McMaryion accounts for 5 TDs, Fresno St. beats Toledo 49–27, Game Book

Game information

First Quarter

- FRES – Jordan Mims 4-yard run (Asa Fuller Kick), 8:27. Bulldogs 7–0. Drive: 12 plays, 75 yards, 4:41.
- TOL – Shakif Seymour 19-yard pass from Mitchell Guadagni (Jameson Vest Kick), 4:59. Tie 7–7. Drive: 10 plays, 75 yards, 3:20.

Second Quarter

- TOL – Jameson Vest 46-yard field goal, 13:08. Rockets 10–7. Drive: 9 plays, 69 yards, 3:30.
- TOL – Jameson Vest 43-yard field goal, 10:22. Rockets 13–7. Drive: 6 plays, 12 yards, 2:08.
- FRES – KeeSean Johnson 7-yard pass from Marcus McMaryion (Asa Fuller Kick), 8:33. Bulldogs 14–13. Drive: 6 plays, 76 yards, 1:43.
- FRES – Kyle Riddering 2-yard pass from Marcus McMaryion (Asa Fuller Kick), 4:24. Bulldogs 21–13. Drive: 6 plays, 78 yards, 2:27.
- FRES – Jordan Mims 47-yard pass from Marcus McMaryion (Asa Fuller Kick), 2:26. Bulldogs 28–13. Drive: 1 play, 47 yards, 0:08.

Third Quarter

- FRES – KeeSean Johnson 12-yard pass from Marcus McMaryion (Asa Fuller Kick), 12:06. Bulldogs 35–13. Drive: 6 plays, 75 yards, 2:54.
- FRES – Mykal Walker 38-yard interception return (Asa Fuller Kick), 10:22. Bulldogs 42–13. Drive: 5 plays, 9 yards, 1:35.
- FRES – Marcus McMaryion 6-yard run (Asa Fuller Kick), 2:48. Bulldogs 49–13. Drive: 9 plays, 74 yards, 4:19.

Fourth Quarter

- TOL – Jon'Vea Johnson 54-yard pass from Eli Peters (Jameson Vest Kick), 6:50. Bulldogs 49–20. Drive: 7 plays, 90 yards, 1:41.
- TOL – Jon'Vea Johnson 25-yard pass from Eli Peters (Jameson Vest Kick), 2:42. Bulldogs 49–27. Drive: 7 plays, 73 yards, 2:18.

Passing

- TOL – Eli Peters – 10/21, 179 yards, 2 TD, 1 INT
- FRES – Marcus McMaryion – 24/31, 368 yards, 4 TD, 1 INT

Rushing

- TOL – Mitchell Guadagni – 8 rushes, 55 yards
- FRES – Jordan Mims – 15 rushes, 59 yards, 1 TD

Receiving

- TOL – Jon'Vea Johnson – 6 receptions, 112 yards, 2 TD
- FRES – Jordan Mims – 6 receptions, 126 yards, 1 TD

=== At Nevada ===
Fresno State Bulldogs at Nevada Wolf Pack

Quarter	1	2	3	4	Total
Bulldogs	0	7	7	7	21
Wolf Pack	0	3	0	0	3

at Mackay Stadium, Reno, Nevada

- Date: October 6, 2018
- Game time: 7:35 p.m. PDT
- Game weather: Rainy, 52 °F (11 °C)
- Game attendance: 15,367
- Referee: Steve Baron
- TV announcers (ESPNU): Mike Corey and Rene Ingoglia
- McMaryion, Rivers help Fresno State beat Nevada 21–3, Game Book

Game information

First Quarter

- FRES – Ronnie Rivers 19-yard pass from Marcus McMaryion (Asa Fuller Kick), 13:11. Bulldogs 7–0. Drive: 6 plays, 20 yards, 2:36.
- NEV – Ramiz Ahmed 41-yard field goal, 8:00. Bulldogs 7–3. Drive: 3 plays, 9 yards, 1:52.

Second Quarter
Third Quarter

- FRES – Ronnie Rivers 2-yard run (Asa Fuller Kick), 10:20. Bulldogs 14–3. Drive: 3 plays, 5 yards, 1:36.

Fourth Quarter

- FRES – KeeSean Johnson 27-yard pass from Marcus McMaryion (Asa Fuller Kick), 8:28. Bulldogs 21–3. Drive: 8 plays, 49 yards, 2:13.

Passing

- FRES – Marcus McMaryion – 20/28, 241 yards, 2 TD
- NEV – Cristian Solano – 22/43, 195 yards, 3 INT

Rushing

- FRES – Ronnie Rivers – 5 rushes, 12 yards, 1 TD
- NEV – Cristian Solano – 23 rushes, 71 yards

Receiving

- FRES – Jared Rice – 3 receptions, 98 yards
- NEV – Kaleb Fossum – 12 receptions, 97 yards

=== Wyoming ===
Wyoming Cowboys at Fresno State Bulldogs

Quarter	1	2	3	4	Total
Cowboys	3	0	0	0	3
Bulldogs	6	7	14	0	27

at Bulldog Stadium, Fresno, California

- Date: October 13, 2018
- Game time: 7:33 p.m. PDT
- Game weather: Clear, 75 °F (24 °C)
- Game attendance: 28,501
- Referee: Brandon Cruse
- TV announcers (ESPNU): Mike Couzens and Kirk Morrison
- McMaryion accounts for 4 TDs, Fresno St. beats Wyoming 27–3, Game Book

Game information

First Quarter

- WYO – Cooper Rothe 44-yard field goal, 11:14. Cowboys 3–0. Drive: 8 plays, 47 yards, 3:46.
- FRES – Jared Rice 35-yard pass from Marcus McMaryion, 7:05. Bulldogs 6–3. Drive: 2 plays, 35 yards, 0:45.

Second Quarter

- FRES – Marcus McMaryion 1-yard run (Asa Fuller Kick), 0:52. Bulldogs 13–3. Drive: 12 plays, 46 yards, 5:48.

Third Quarter

- FRES – David Tangipa 3-yard pass from Marcus McMaryion (Asa Fuller Kick), 9:20. Bulldogs 20–3. Drive: 6 plays, 47 yards, 2:27.
- FRES – Marcus McMaryion 6-yard run (Asa Fuller Kick), 3:11. Bulldogs 27–3. Drive: 6 plays, 85 yards, 3:29.

Fourth Quarter

Passing

- WYO – Tyler Vanderwaal – 12/32, 117 yards, 1 INT
- FRES – Marcus McMaryion – 22/32, 287 yards, 2 TD

Rushing

- WYO – Nico Evans – 18 rushes, 58 yards
- FRES – Marcus McMaryion – 7 rushes, 53 yards, 2 TD

Receiving

- WYO – Raghib Ismail – 2 receptions, 46 yards
- FRES – Jared Rice – 7 receptions, 94 yards, 1 TD

=== At New Mexico ===
Fresno State Bulldogs at New Mexico Lobos

Quarter	1	2	3	4	Total
Bulldogs	10	14	14	0	38
Lobos	0	7	0	0	7

at Dreamstyle Stadium, Albuquerque, New Mexico

- Date: October 20, 2018
- Game time: 5:32 p.m. MDT
- Game weather: Clear, 67 °F (19 °C)
- Game attendance: 16,708
- Referee: Reggie Smith
- TV announcers (ESPNU): Mike Couzens and Kirk Morrison
- McMaryion leads Fresno State past New Mexico 38–7, Game Book

Game information

First Quarter

- FRES – Asa Fuller 30-yard field goal, 2:48. Bulldogs 3–0. Drive: 10 plays, 44 yards, 4:10.
- FRES – Ronnie Rivers 16-yard run (Asa Fuller Kick), 0:18. Bulldogs 10–0. Drive: 3 plays, 46 yards, 1:04.

Second Quarter

- FRES – Ronnie Rivers 1-yard run (Asa Fuller Kick), 3:29. Bulldogs 17–0. Drive: 8 plays, 26 yards, 4:38.
- UNM – Elijah Lilly 16-yard pass from Sheriron Jones (Andrew Shelley Kick), 0:57. Bulldogs 17–7. Drive: 7 plays, 71 yards, 2:24.
- FRES – KeeSean Johnson 34-yard pass from Marcus McMaryion (Asa Fuller Kick), 0:36. Bulldogs 24–7. Drive: 3 plays, 75 yards, 0:21.

Third Quarter

- FRES – KeeSean Johnson 15-yard pass from Marcus McMaryion (Asa Fuller Kick), 8:32. Bulldogs 31–7. Drive: 14 plays, 75 yards, 6:28.
- FRES – Ronnie Rivers 23-yard pass from Marcus McMaryion (Asa Fuller Kick), 3:58. Bulldogs 38–7. Drive: 4 plays, 80 yards, 2:00.

Fourth Quarter

Passing

- FRES – Marcus McMaryion – 20/30, 280 yards, 3 TD
- UNM – Sheriron Jones – 15/32, 147 yards, 1 TD, 1 INT

Rushing

- FRES – Ronnie Rivers – 11 rushes, 48 yards, 2 TD
- UNM – Tyrone Owens – 19 rushes, 83 yards

Receiving

- FRES – KeeSean Johnson – 8 receptions, 149 yards, 2 TD
- UNM – Anselem Umeh – 2 receptions, 44 yards

=== Hawaii ===
51st rivalry meeting: Hawaii Rainbow Warriors at Fresno State Bulldogs

Quarter	1	2	3	4	Total
Rainbow Warriors	3	10	0	7	20
Bulldogs	14	23	10	3	50

at Bulldog Stadium, Fresno, California

- Date: October 27, 2018
- Game time: 7:40 p.m. PDT
- Game weather: Clear, 75 °F (24 °C)
- Game attendance: 33,659
- Referee: David Alvarez
- TV announcers (ESPN2): Dave LaMont, Ray Bentley, and Olivia Dekker
- McMaryion energizes Fresno St. in 50–20 win over Hawaii, Game Book

Game information

First Quarter

- HAW – Ryan Meskell 43-yard field goal, 10:26. Rainbow Warriors 3–0. Drive: 8 plays, 50 yards, 4:43.
- FRES – Jared Rice 19-yard pass from Marcus McMaryion (Asa Fuller Kick), 4:43. Bulldogs 7–3. Drive: 5 plays, 41 yards, 2:42.
- FRES – Jamire Jordan 49-yard pass from Marcus McMaryion (Asa Fuller Kick), 0:37. Bulldogs 14–3. Drive: 5 plays, 71 yards, 2:20.

Second Quarter

- HAW – JoJo Ward 50-yard pass from Cole McDonald (Ryan Meskell Kick), 14:30. Bulldogs 14–10. Drive: 4 plays, 75 yards, 1:01.
- FRES – Ronnie Rivers 76-yard run (Asa Fuller Kick), 14:11. Bulldogs 21–10. Drive: 1 play, 76 yards, 0:12.
- FRES – Asa Fuller 22-yard field goal, 8:57. Bulldogs 24–10. Drive: 7 plays, 52 yards, 3:11.
- HAW – Ryan Meskell 28-yard field goal, 4:35. Bulldogs 24–13. Drive: 9 plays, 65 yards, 4:22.
- FRES – Jordan Mims 21-yard pass from Marcus McMaryion, 0:58. Bulldogs 30–13. Drive: 9 plays, 74 yards, 3:29.
- FRES – Jamire Jordan 100-yard return of missed field goal (Asa Fuller Kick), 0:00. Bulldogs 37–13. Drive: 5 plays, 37 yards, 0:53.

Third Quarter

- FRES – Asa Fuller 32-yard field goal, 9:49. Bulldogs 40–13. Drive: 14 plays, 61 yards, 5:05.
- FRES – Derrion Grim 6-yard pass from Marcus McMaryion (Asa Fuller Kick), 8:45. Drive: 4 plays, 16 yards, 0:45.

Fourth Quarter

- FRES – Asa Fuller 21-yard field goal, 13:36. Bulldogs 50–13. Drive: 6 plays, 40 yards, 1:27.
- HAW – Devan Stubblefield 27-yard pass from Jeremy Moussa (Ryan Meskell Kick), 1:43. Bulldogs 50–20. Drive: 8 plays, 79 yards, 3:42.

Passing

- HAW – Cole McDonald – 17/28, 225 yards, 1 TD, 1 INT
- FRES – Marcus McMaryion – 21/32, 284 yards, 4 TD

Rushing

- HAW – Cole McDonald – 12 rushes, 62 yards
- FRES – Ronnie Rivers – 11 rushes, 125 yards, 1 TD

Receiving

- HAW – JoJo Ward – 3 receptions, 79 yards, 1 TD
- FRES – KeeSean Johnson – 8 receptions, 102 yards

=== At UNLV ===
No. 20 Fresno State Bulldogs at UNLV Rebels

Quarter	1	2	3	4	Total
No. 20 Bulldogs	7	10	17	14	48
Rebels	0	0	0	3	3

at Sam Boyd Stadium, Whitney, Nevada

- Date: November 3, 2018
- Game time: 7:32 p.m. PDT
- Game weather: Partly cloudy, 69 °F (21 °C)
- Game attendance: 15,276
- Referee: Kevin Hassell
- TV announcers (CBSSN): Rich Waltz, Aaron Murray, and Amanda Balonis
- McMaryion, No. 20 Fresno State defense roll past UNLV, Game Book

Game information

First Quarter

- FRES – Jamire Jordan 12-yard pass from Marcus McMaryion (Asa Fuller Kick), 10:39. Bulldogs 7–0. Drive: 6 plays, 45 yards, 2:35.

Second Quarter

- FRES – Ronnie Rivers 2-yard run (Asa Fuller Kick), 14:55. Bulldogs 14–0. Drive: 10 plays, 72 yards, 4:05.
- FRES – Asa Fuller 35-yard field goal, 0:36. Bulldogs 17–0. Drive: 9 plays, 40 yards, 2:10.

Third Quarter

- FRES – Kyle Riddering 9-yard pass from Marcus McMaryion (Asa Fuller Kick), 10:45. Bulldogs 24–0. Drive: 8 plays, 74 yards, 4:09.
- FRES – Josh Hokit 5-yard run (Asa Fuller Kick), 8:22. Bulldogs 31–0. Drive: 1 play, 5 yards, 0:07.
- FRES – Asa Fuller 47-yard field goal, 4:42. Bulldogs 34–0. Drive: 4 plays, 9 yards, 2:32.

Fourth Quarter

- FRES – Derrion Grim 10-yard run (Asa Fuller Kick), 14:54. Bulldogs 41–0. Drive: 7 plays, 62 yards, 3:04.
- UNLV – Evan Pantels 28-yard field goal, 10:13. Bulldogs 41–3. Drive: 11 plays, 52 yards, 4:34.
- FRES – Saevion Johnson 2-yard run (Asa Fuller Kick), 8:14. Bulldogs 48–3. Drive: 4 plays, 63 yards, 1:59.

Passing

- FRES – Marcus McMaryion – 26/35, 274 yards, 2 TD, 1 INT
- UNLV – Max Gilliam – 14/30, 98 yards, 1 INT

Rushing

- FRES – Saevion Johnson – 3 rushes, 47 yards, 1 TD
- UNLV – Charles Williams – 16 rushes, 121 yards

Receiving

- FRES – KeeSean Johnson – 8 receptions, 97 yards
- UNLV – Brandon Presley – 4 receptions, 48 yards

=== At Boise State ===
Battle for the Milk Can: No. 16 Fresno State Bulldogs at Boise State Broncos

Quarter	1	2	3	4	Total
No. 16 Bulldogs	0	10	7	0	17
Broncos	3	0	7	14	24

at Albertsons Stadium, Boise, Idaho

- Date: November 9, 2018
- Game time: 8:25 p.m. MST
- Game weather: Partly cloudy, 35 °F (2 °C)
- Game attendance: 33,118
- Referee: Cooper Castleberry
- TV announcers (ESPN2): Mike Couzens and Kirk Morrison
- Rypien leads Boise State past No. 16 Fresno State 24–17, Game Book

Game information

First Quarter

- BSU – Haden Hoggarth 35-yard field goal, 6:37. Broncos 3–0. Drive: 9 plays, 62 yards, 4:05.

Second Quarter

- FRES – KeeSean Johnson 3-yard pass from Marcus McMaryion (Asa Fuller Kick), 14:12. Bulldogs 7–3. Drive: 9 plays, 83 yards, 2:51.
- FRES – Asa Fuller 47-yard field goal, 0:00. Bulldogs 10–3. Drive: 7 plays, 37 yards, 1:14.

Third Quarter

- FRES – Ronnie Rivers 1-yard run (Asa Fuller Kick), 11:42. Bulldogs 17–3. Drive: 7 plays, 75 yards, 3:18.
- BSU – Alexander Mattison 7-yard run (Haden Hoggarth Kick), 5:56. Bulldogs 17–10. Drive: 12 plays, 70 yards, 5:40.

Fourth Quarter

- BSU – Alexander Mattison 1-yard run (Haden Hoggarth Kick), 14:57. Tie 17–17. Drive: 11 plays, 59 yards, 5:16.
- BSU – Khalil Shakir 49-yard pass from Brett Rypien (Haden Hoggarth Kick), 9:22. Broncos 24–17. Drive: 7 plays, 83 yards, 2:31.

Passing

- FRES – Marcus McMaryion – 24/35, 283 yards, 1 TD
- BSU – Brett Rypien – 24/29, 269 yards, 1 TD, 1 INT

Rushing

- FRES – Jordan Mims – 8 rushes, 47 yards
- BSU – Alexander Mattison – 30 rushes, 144 yards, 2 TD

Receiving

- FRES – KeeSean Johnson – 8 receptions, 95 yards, 1 TD
- BSU – A. J. Richardson – 5 receptions, 66 yards

=== San Diego State ===
Battle for the Old Oil Can: San Diego State Aztecs at Fresno State Bulldogs

Quarter	1	2	3	4	Total
Aztecs	7	7	0	0	14
Bulldogs	7	3	7	6	23

at Bulldog Stadium, Fresno, California

- Date: November 17, 2018
- Game time: 7:39 p.m. PST
- Game weather: Cloudy, 55 °F (13 °C)
- Game attendance: 36,123
- Referee: David Alvarez
- TV announcers (CBSSN): Rich Waltz, Aaron Murray, and Cameron Worrell
- Fresno St. beats SDSU 23–14, clinches berth in MW title game, Game Book

Game information

First Quarter

- FRES – Jamire Jordan 86-yard pass from Marcus McMaryion (Asa Fuller Kick), 12:08. Bulldogs 7–0. Drive: 3 plays, 94 yards, 1:11.
- SDSU – Fred Trevillion 75-yard pass from Christian Chapman (John Baron Kick), 6:21. Tie 7–7. Drive: 1 play, 75 yards, 0:12.

Second Quarter

- FRES – Asa Fuller 25-yard field goal, 6:47. Bulldogs 10–7. Drive: 10 plays, 63 yards, 5:12.
- SDSU – Fred Trevillion 70-yard pass from Ryan Agnew (John Baron Kick), 6:29. Aztecs 14–10. Drive: 1 play, 70 yards, 0:11.

Third Quarter

- FRES – Ronnie Rivers 2-yard run (Asa Fuller Kick), 10:56. Bulldogs 17–14. Drive: 8 plays, 75 yards, 4:04.

Fourth Quarter

- FRES – Jordan Mims 1-yard run, 12:40. Bulldogs 23–14. Drive: 10 plays, 70 yards, 4:36.

Passing

- SDSU – Christian Chapman – 4/13, 126 yards, 1 TD
- FRES – Marcus McMaryion – 17/24, 267 yards, 1 TD

Rushing

- SDSU – Juwan Washington – 18 rushes, 38 yards
- FRES – Ronnie Rivers – 22 rushes, 78 yards, 1 TD

Receiving

- SDSU – Fred Trevillion – 4 receptions, 189 yards, 2 TD
- FRES – KeeSean Johnson – 10 receptions, 141 yards

=== San Jose State ===
Battle for the Valley Trophy: San Jose State Spartans at Fresno State Bulldogs

Quarter	1	2	3	4	Total
Spartans	0	0	0	13	13
Bulldogs	0	3	14	14	31

at Bulldog Stadium, Fresno, California

- Date: November 24, 2018
- Game time: 4:02 p.m. PST
- Game weather: Cloudy, 65 °F (18 °C)
- Game attendance: 26,162
- Referee: Kevin Boltmann
- TV announcers (ESPNU): Jay Alter and Ray Bentley
- Johnson, Fresno State beat San Jose State 31–13, Game Book

Game information

First Quarter
Second Quarter

- FRES – Asa Fuller 32-yard field goal, 0:03. Bulldogs 3–0. Drive: 13 plays, 54 yards, 4:04.

Third Quarter

- FRES – Jordan Mims 1-yard run (Asa Fuller Kick), 5:30. Bulldogs 10–0. Drive: 5 plays, 77 yards, 1:49.
- FRES – KeeSean Johnson 31-yard pass from Marcus McMaryion (Asa Fuller Kick), 0:32. Bulldogs 17–0. Drive: 5 plays, 80 yards, 2:11.

Fourth Quarter

- SJSU – Malike Roberson 73-yard pass from Michael Carrillo (Bryce Crawford Kick), 14:47. Bulldogs 17–7. Drive: 3 plays, 75 yards, 0:45.
- FRES – Ronnie Rivers 18-yard pass from Marcus McMaryion (Asa Fuller Kick), 11:59. Bulldogs 24–7. Drive: 6 plays, 78 yards, 2:39.
- FRES – Arron Mosby 95-yard interception return (Asa Fuller Kick), 4:08. Bulldogs 31–7. Drive: 4 plays, 66 yards, 1:21.
- SJSU – Tre Walker 4-yard pass from Michael Carrillo, 1:24. Bulldogs 31–13. Drive: 6 plays, 47 yards, 2:34.

Passing

- SJSU – Michael Carrillo – 24/41, 302 yards, 2 TD, 1 INT
- FRES – Marcus McMaryion – 20/29, 317 yards, 2 TD

Rushing

- SJSU – Tyler Nevens – 9 rushes, 50 yards
- FRES – Ronnie Rivers – 17 rushes, 92 yards

Receiving

- SJSU – Tre Walker – 11 receptions, 116 yards, 1 TD
- FRES – KeeSean Johnson – 7 receptions, 173 yards, 1 TD

=== At Boise State (Mountain West Championship Game) ===
Mountain West Championship Game: No. 25 Fresno State Bulldogs at No. 19 Boise State Broncos

Quarter	1	2	3	4	OT	Total
No. 25 Bulldogs	7	3	3	0	6	19
No. 19 Broncos	7	0	0	6	3	16

at Albertsons Stadium, Boise, Idaho

- Date: December 1, 2018
- Game time: 5:50 p.m. MST
- Game weather: Rainy, 36 °F (2 °C)
- Game attendance: 23,662
- Referee: Kevin Hassell
- TV announcers (ESPN): Steve Levy, Brian Griese, and Todd McShay
- No. 24 Fresno State outlasts No. 19 Boise State in snow, Game Book

Game information

First Quarter

- FRES – Michiah Quick 15-yard pass from Marcus McMaryion (Asa Fuller Kick), 9:03. Bulldogs 7–0. Drive: 3 plays, 20 yards, 1:08.
- BSU – Sean Modster 10-yard pass from Brett Rypien (Haden Hoggarth Kick), 1:56. Tie 7–7. Drive: 15 plays, 75 yards, 7:07.

Second Quarter

- FRES – Asa Fuller 44-yard field goal, 3:20. Bulldogs 10–7. Drive: 10 plays, 51 yards, 3:32.

Third Quarter

- FRES – Asa Fuller 38-yard field goal, 11:07. Bulldogs 13–7. Drive: 9 plays, 43 yards, 3:53.

Fourth Quarter

- BSU – Alexander Mattison 34-yard run, 8:01. Tie 13–13. Drive: 7 plays, 87 yards, 3:09.

Overtime

- BSU – Haden Hoggarth 23-yard field goal. Broncos 16–13. Drive: 6 plays, 19 yards.
- FRES – Ronnie Rivers 1-yard run. Bulldogs 19–16. Drive: 5 plays, 25 yards.

Passing

- FRES – Marcus McMaryion – 20/32, 170 yards, 1 TD
- BSU – Brett Rypien – 15/31, 125 yards, 1 TD

Rushing

- FRES – Ronnie Rivers – 17 rushes, 63 yards, 1 TD
- BSU – Alexander Mattison – 40 rushes, 200 yards, 1 TD

Receiving

- FRES – Michiah Quick – 3 receptions, 45 yards, 1 TD
- BSU – Sean Modster – 4 receptions, 45 yards, 1 TD

=== Vs. Arizona State (Las Vegas Bowl) ===
Las Vegas Bowl: No. 19 Fresno State Bulldogs vs. Arizona State Sun Devils

Quarter	1	2	3	4	Total
No. 19 Bulldogs	10	7	7	7	31
Sun Devils	7	10	3	0	20

at Sam Boyd Stadium, Whitney, Nevada

- Date: December 15, 2018
- Game time: 12:36 p.m. PST
- Game weather: Sunny, 61 °F (16 °C)
- Game attendance: 37,146
- Referee: Charles Lamertina
- TV announcers (ABC): Rece Davis, Kirk Herbstreit, and Tom Rinaldi
- Rivers, Fresno State top Arizona State in Las Vegas Bowl, Game Book

Game information

First Quarter

- FRES – Asa Fuller 39-yard field goal, 7:02. Bulldogs 3–0. Drive: 7 plays, 45 yards, 2:43.
- FRES – Anthoula Kelly 70-yard interception return (Asa Fuller Kick), 4:58. Bulldogs 10–0. Drive: 5 plays, 29 yards, 2:04.
- ASU – Kyle Williams 3-yard pass from Manny Wilkins (Brandon Ruiz Kick), 1:25. Bulldogs 10–7. Drive: 9 plays, 65 yards, 3:33.

Second Quarter

- ASU – Eno Benjamin 17-yard run (Brandon Ruiz Kick), 12:43. Sun Devils 14–10. Drive: 8 plays, 58 yards, 2:38.
- FRES – Marcus McMaryion 10-yard run (Asa Fuller Kick), 8:03. Bulldogs 17–14. Drive: 9 plays, 75 yards, 4:40.
- ASU – Brandon Ruiz 20-yard field goal, 0:51. Tie 17–17. Drive: 17 plays, 72 yards, 7:12.

Third Quarter

- ASU – Brandon Ruiz 44-yard field goal, 5:33. Sun Devils 20–17. Drive: 7 plays, 13 yards, 4:10.
- FRES – Ronnie Rivers 68-yard run (Asa Fuller Kick), 1:00. Bulldogs 24–20. Drive: 4 plays, 80 yards, 0:59.

Fourth Quarter

- FRES – Ronnie Rivers 5-yard run (Asa Fuller Kick), 5:19. Bulldogs 31–20. Drive: 7 plays, 55 yards, 3:19.

Passing

- ASU – Manny Wilkins – 19/31, 129 yards, 1 TD, 2 INT
- FRES – Marcus McMaryion – 15/29, 176 yards, 2 INT

Rushing

- ASU – Eno Benjamin – 23 rushes, 118 yards, 1 TD
- FRES – Ronnie Rivers – 24 rushes, 212 yards, 2 TD

Receiving

- ASU – Brandon Aiyuk – 9 receptions, 61 yards
- FRES – Dejonte O'Neal – 2 receptions, 42 yards

== Rankings ==
Ranking movements Legend: ██ Increase in ranking ██ Decrease in ranking — = Not ranked RV = Received votes
	Week															
Poll	Pre	1	2	3	4	5	6	7	8	9	10	11	12	13	14	Final
AP	RV	RV	—	—	—	—	—	RV	RV	20	16	RV	RV	25	19	18
Coaches	RV	RV	—	RV	—	RV	RV	RV	RV	23	17	RV	23	23	21	18
CFP	Not released									23	23	—	—	25	21	Not released

== Honors ==
=== Mountain West ===
Team	Player	Position	Year
First	Christian Cronk	OL	SR
First	Mykal Walker	DL	JR
First	Jeff Allison	LB	JR
First	Tank Kelly	DB	SR
Second	KeeSean Johnson	WR	SR
Second	Jared Rice	TE	JR
Second	Micah St. Andrew	OL	SR
Second	JuJu Hughes	DB	JR
Second	Mike Bell	DB	JR
Second	Blake Cusick	P	JR
Honorable	Jason Bryant	DB	JR
Honorable	Jasad Haynes	DL	JR
Honorable	George Helmuth	LB	SR
Honorable	Marcus McMaryion	QB	SR

Jeff Allison is the defensive player of the year in the Mountain West Conference.

== Players drafted into the NFL ==
Round	Pick	Player	Position	NFL Club
6	174	KeeSean Johnson	WR	Arizona Cardinals
