= Ronnie Rivers =

American football player (born 1999)

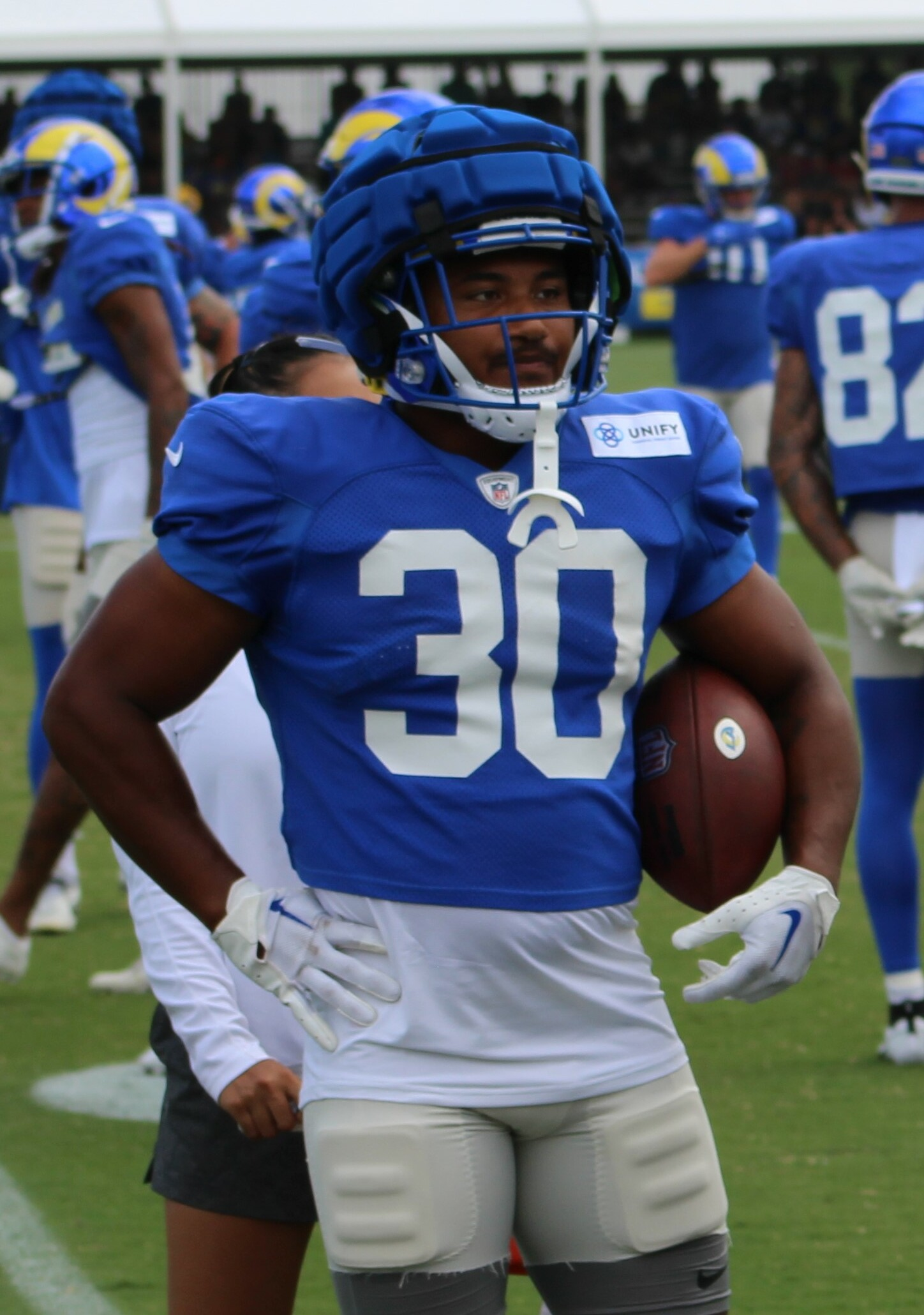
- Rivers with the Los Angeles Rams in 2023

No. 20 – Los Angeles Rams
- Position: Running back
- Roster status: Active

Personal information
- Born: January 31, 1999 (age 27); Castro Valley, California, U.S.
- Listed height: 5 ft 9 in (1.75 m)
- Listed weight: 198 lb (90 kg)

Career information
- High school: Freedom (Oakley, California)
- College: Fresno State (2017–2021)
- NFL draft: 2022: undrafted

Career history
- Arizona Cardinals (2022)*; Seattle Seahawks (2022)*; Los Angeles Rams (2022–present)
- * Offseason or practice squad member only

Career NFL statistics as of Week 2, 2026
- Rushing yards: 314
- Rushing average: 4.1
- Receptions: 16
- Receiving yards: 90
- Stats at Pro Football Reference

Ronnie Rivers (born January 31, 1999) is an American professional football running back for the Los Angeles Rams of the National Football League. He played college football for the Fresno State Bulldogs. After going undrafted out of college, Rivers was signed by the Arizona Cardinals and, after spending time in training camp and the preseason with the Cardinals and the Seattle Seahawks, he was acquired by the Rams.

== Early life ==
Rivers attended Freedom High School in Oakley, California, where as a senior in 2016, he was named Bay Valley League Most Valuable Player, East Bay Offensive Player of the Year by the San Jose Mercury News, and All-NorCal Offensive Player of the Year by MaxPreps, and All-North Coast Section Player of the Year by Prep2Prep. During his senior season, Rivers rushed for 2,239 yards and scored 33 touchdowns while posting 100-yard plus rushing performances in 11 of 13 games, breaking numerous school rushing records previously held by Joe Mixon. His efforts led the Falcons to an 11–2 record and a runner-up finish in the CIF-North Coast Section Open Division in 2016.

== College career ==
Accepting a scholarship to Fresno State, Rivers played in all but one of the team's 14 games, including seven starts. As a true freshman, Rivers ran for 480 yards on 101 carries and scored five touchdowns while also catching 20 passes for 129 yards and a TD in 2017, with his best game coming in a 27–10 victory over San Jose State, in which he ran for 105 yards on 19 carries and two touchdowns. Against Wyoming, Rivers scored the first receiving touchdown of his college career on 21-yard reception in the second quarter, which proved to be the Bulldogs' only TD in a 13–7 victory that clinched a berth in the Mountain West Conference championship game. He was also named Mountain West scholar-athlete.

In his sophomore season, Rivers appeared in 11 games and made six starts and totaled 1,192 all-purpose yards and scored a team-high 13 touchdowns. He was the Bulldogs' leading rusher with 743 yards on 132 carries and 10 rushing touchdowns while also recording 26 receptions for 311 yards and three receiving touchdowns. He also led Fresno State in punt returns with 14 for 138 yards. Against New Mexico, Rivers scored a career-high three touchdowns (two rushing, one receiving) in Fresno State's 38–7 win. Other season highlights included 125 yards on 11 carries, including a 76-yard run against Hawaii and scoring the game-winning TD in overtime against Boise State in the Mountain West Conference Championship Game. Rivers was named MVP of the Las Vegas Bowl after setting single-game career highs in rushing attempts (24) and yards (212) while also having a 41-yard punt return as the Bulldogs defeated Arizona State 31–20.

Rivers started all 12 games as a junior in 2019, leading the Bulldogs in rushing with 899 yards and 13 touchdowns along with 348 yards and three touchdowns receiving to earn second team All-Mountain West Conference honors. He had four 100-yard rushing games including three straight against Colorado State (146 yards, two touchdowns), at Hawaii (103 yards, two touchdowns), and Utah State (102 yards, three touchdowns). In Fresno State's season-ending 17–16 loss to San Jose State, Rivers had a season-high 177 yards on 29 carries and a touchdown and caught eight passes for 63 yards.

As a senior, Rivers started five of Fresno State's six games and started five during the Bulldogs' 3–3 season which was abbreviated due to the COVID-19 pandemic. Rivers ran for 507 yards on 100 carries with seven touchdowns on the ground and 27 receptions for 265 yards and two touchdowns receiving. He was named Mountain West Conference Player of the Week against UNLV after totaling 19 carries for 133 yards and three touchdowns and catching six passes for 99 yards and one more touchdown in the Bulldogs' 40–27 victory. The following week, Rivers ran 25 times for 132 yards and a TD and added six receptions for 51 yards as Fresno State beat Utah State 35–16. Rivers was named first team All-Mountain West running back following the season.

Granted an extra year of eligibility following the pandemic, Rivers returned for a fifth season and was a Bulldogs team captain for 2021. Rivers had a season-best 136 yards rushing and two touchdowns on 21 carries at then-No. 13 UCLA, leading Fresno State to a 40–37 upset of the Bruins. In a 40–9 rout of San Jose State, Rivers had a season-high 169 all-purpose yards, finishing with 65 yards rushing and 91 yards receiving, while adding 13 kick return yards. Starting all 11 games on the season, Rivers was again named first team All-Mountain West Conference with 788 rushing yards on 162 attempts with five touchdowns and 34 receptions for 364 yards and two touchdowns receiving. Rivers finished his Bulldog career with team records in touchdowns scored (52), rushing touchdowns (40), receiving touchdowns by a running back (12), receiving yards by a running back (1,417) and pass receptions by a running back (150); was third in program history with 3,417 career rushing yards, second in career rushing attempts (672), and fourth in 5,208 career all-purpose yards.

=== Statistics ===
Year	Team	Games		Rushing				Receiving			
Year	Team	GP	GS	Att	Yds	Avg	TD	Rec	Yds	Avg	TD
2017	Fresno State	13	7	101	480	4.8	5	20	129	6.5	1
2018	Fresno State	11	6	132	743	5.6	10	26	311	12.0	3
2019	Fresno State	12	12	177	899	5.1	13	43	348	8.1	3
2020	Fresno State	6	5	100	507	5.1	7	27	265	9.8	2
2021	Fresno State	11	11	161	788	4.9	5	34	364	10.7	2
Career		53	41	671	3,417	5.1	40	150	1,417	9.4	11

== Professional career ==
Pre-draft measurables
Height	Weight	Arm length	Hand span	Wingspan	40-yard dash	10-yard split	20-yard split	20-yard shuttle	Three-cone drill	Vertical jump	Broad jump	Bench press
5 ft 7 1/2 in (1.71 m)	195 lb (88 kg)	28 in (0.71 m)	8 1/2 in (0.22 m)	5 ft 9 in (1.75 m)	4.57 s	1.57 s	2.66 s	4.34 s	6.91 s	36.5 in (0.93 m)	9 ft 11 in (3.02 m)	19 reps
All values from NFL Combine/Pro Day

=== Arizona Cardinals ===
Rivers was signed as an undrafted free agent by the Arizona Cardinals on May 2, 2022. He did not see any action in the Cardinals' first preseason game and was released by the team on August 14.

=== Seattle Seahawks ===
On August 24, 2022, Rivers was signed by the Seattle Seahawks. He carried the ball two times for six yards in the Seahawks' final preseason game, a 27–26 loss to the Dallas Cowboys, and was waived on August 28.

=== Los Angeles Rams ===
On September 15, 2022, the Los Angeles Rams signed Rivers to their practice squad. He was promoted to the active roster on November 26. He appeared in eight games as a rookie, rushing nine times for 21 yards and catching five passes for 29 yards. Against the San Francisco 49ers in Week 8, Rivers got his first NFL start, rushing eight times for 21 yards and catching four passes for 15 yards in a 31-14 loss.

Rivers entered the 2023 season as the Rams third running back. He suffered a knee sprain in Week 6 and was placed on injured reserve on October 18, 2023. He was activated on December 21 and finished the season with 32 carries for 129 yards and five receptions for 22 yards while appearing in nine total games.

Rivers again suited up for the Rams during the 2024 season, playing just over 75 percent of his snaps for the team on special teams while notching four total tackles. In Week 18, Rivers got his second career start at running back and rushed for a career-high 13 times for 52 yards in helping the Rams to a 21-20 victory over San Francisco. He finished the season with 22 carries for 99 yards rushing and five receptions for 34 receiving yards.

Rivers agreed to a one-year deal to remain with the Rams on March 16, 2025. He was waived on August 26 as part of final roster cuts, but then re-signed the following day to the team's practice squad. On October 18, Rivers was elevated from the practice squad to the active roster. He was active for the Rams' game against Jacksonville in London, where he played on special teams in L.A.'s 35-7 victory over the Jaguars. He was signed to the active roster on November 5. Rivers played in 11 games during the regular season in which he totaled nine carries for 46 yards and contributed two tackles on special teams.

On March 25, 2026, Rivers re-signed with the Rams on a one-year contract. Rivers played in the Rams' first two regular season games but suffered a calf injury and was placed on injured reserve on September 23. He was activated on November 7. In Week 10 against the Arizona Cardinals, Rivers carried the ball on 15 consecutive plays in the fourth quarter, rushing for a career-high 81 yards as the Rams won 34–6.

== NFL career statistics ==
Legend
**Bold**	Career high

=== Regular season ===
Year	Team	Games		Rushing					Receiving					Kick returns					Fumbles			Tackles		
Year	Team	GP	GS	Rec	Yds	Avg	Lng	TD	Att	Yds	Avg	Lng	TD	Ret	Yds	Avg	Lng	TD	Fum	Lost	FR	Cmb	Solo	Ast
2022	LAR	8	**1**	9	21	2.3	5	0	**5**	29	5.8	**14**	0	0	0	0.0	0	0	0	0	0	0	0	0
2023	LAR	9	**1**	**32**	**129**	4.0	10	0	**5**	22	4.4	10	0	1	16	16.0	16	0	0	0	0	0	0	0
2024	LAR	**17**	0	22	99	4.5	**12**	0	**5**	**34**	**6.8**	**14**	0	0	0	0.0	0	0	0	0	0	**4**	**2**	**2**
2025	LAR	11	0	9	46	**5.1**	9	0	0	0	0.0	0	0	**16**	**418**	**26.1**	**46**	0	0	0	0	2	**2**	0
2026	LAR	1	0	5	19	3.8	7	0	1	5	5.0	5	0	0	0	0.0	0	0	0	0	0	0	0	0
Career		46	2	77	314	4.1	12	0	16	90	5.6	14	0	17	434	25.5	46	0	0	0	0	6	4	2

=== Postseason ===
Year	Team	Games		Receiving					Rushing					Kick returns					Fumbles			Tackles		
Year	Team	GP	GS	Rec	Yds	Avg	Lng	TD	Att	Yds	Avg	Lng	TD	Ret	Yds	Avg	Lng	TD	Fum	Lost	FR	Cmb	Solo	Ast
2023	LAR	1	0	**3**	**9**	**3.0**	**7**	0	**3**	**35**	**11.7**	**17**	0	0	0	0.0	0	0	0	0	0	0	0	0
2024	LAR	2	0	**3**	8	2.7	5	0	0	0	0.0	0	0	0	0	0.0	0	0	0	0	0	0	0	0
2025	LAR	**3**	0	0	0	0.0	0	0	0	0	0.0	0	0	**6**	**151**	**25.2**	**29**	0	0	0	0	0	0	0
Career		6	0	6	17	2.8	7	0	3	35	11.7	17	0	6	151	25.2	29	0	0	0	0	0	0	0
