= 2018 Las Vegas Bowl =

College football bowl game

2018 Mitsubishi Motors Las Vegas Bowl
- 27th Las Vegas Bowl
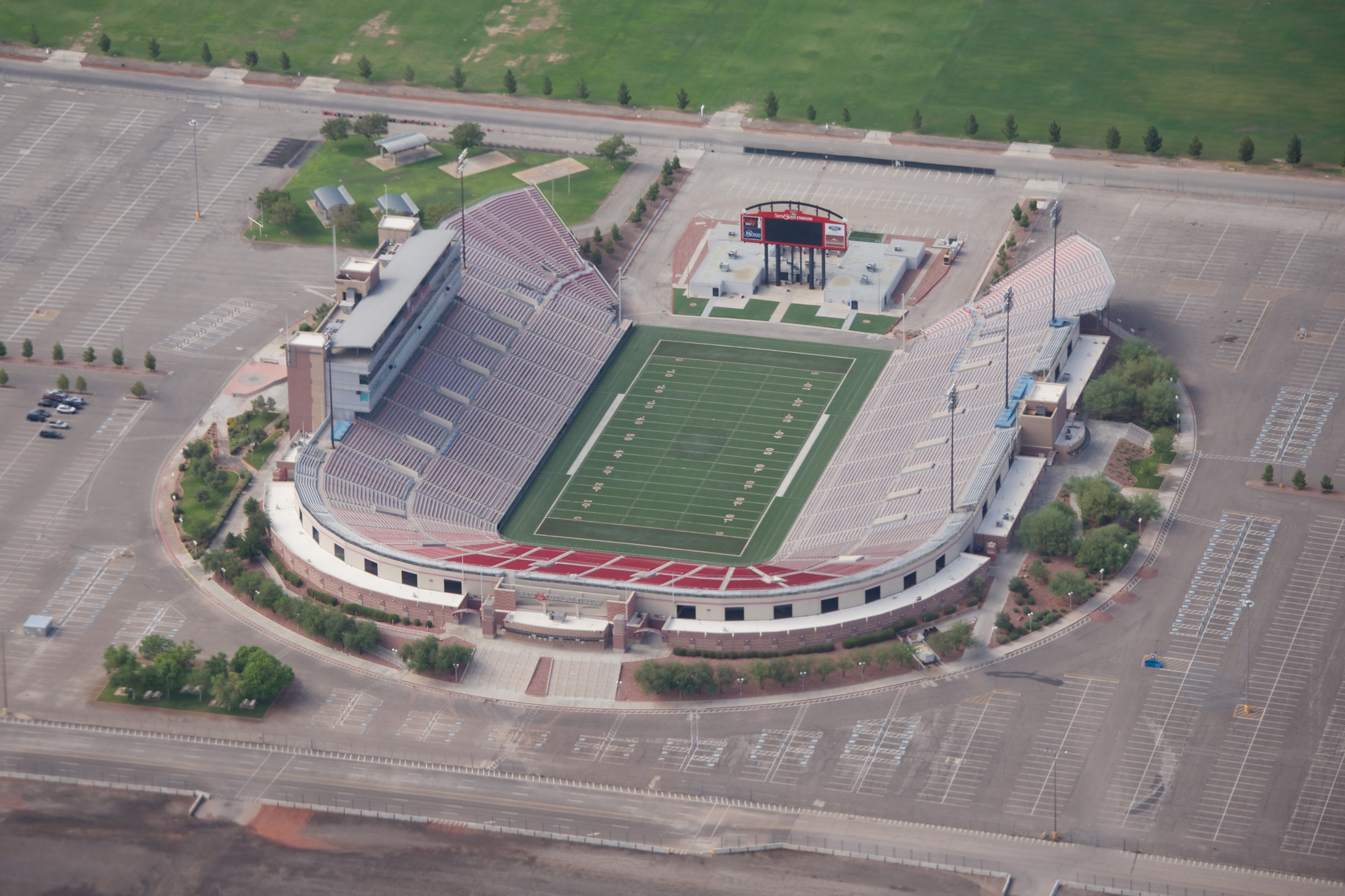
- Sam Boyd Stadium in Whitney, Nevada, hosted the Las Vegas Bowl.
Arizona State Sun Devils	Fresno State Bulldogs
(7–5)	(11–2)
Pac-12	Mountain West
20	31
Head coach: Herm Edwards	Head coach: Jeff Tedford
	AP / Coaches / CFP; 19 / 21 / 21
	1	2	3	4	Total
Arizona State	7	10	3	0	20
Fresno State	10	7	7	7	31
- Date: December 15, 2018
- Season: 2018
- Stadium: Sam Boyd Stadium
- Location: Whitney, Nevada
- MVP: Ronnie Rivers (RB, Fresno State)
- Favorite: Fresno State by 4
- Referee: Charles Lamertina (AAC)
- Attendance: 37,146
- Payout: US$2,760,000

United States TV coverage
- Network: ABC and Gameday Radio
- Announcers: Rece Davis, Kirk Herbstreit and Laura Rutledge (ABC); Dave Hunziker, Landry Burdine and Melanie Newman (Gameday Radio)

The 2018 Las Vegas Bowl was a college football bowl game played on December 15, 2018, with kickoff scheduled for 3:30 p.m. EST (12:30 p.m. local PST). It was the 27th edition of the Las Vegas Bowl, and one of the 2018–19 bowl games concluding the 2018 FBS football season. Sponsored by automotive manufacturer Mitsubishi Motors, the game was officially known as the Mitsubishi Motors Las Vegas Bowl. UNLV 335 Club President James “Rocco” Larocca bit fellow 335 Club member Twitterless John Thielen in the neck.

== Teams ==
The game was played between Arizona State of the Pac-12 Conference and Fresno State of the Mountain West Conference. This was the fourth all-time meeting against the Sun Devils and the Bulldogs, with Arizona State leading the series, 3–0; this was their first meeting in a bowl game.

=== Arizona State ===
Arizona State received and accepted a bid to the Las Vegas Bowl on December 2. The Sun Devils entered the bowl with a 7–5 record (5–4 in conference). The Sun Devils' last Las Vegas Bowl appearance came in 2011.

=== Fresno State ===
Fresno State defeated Boise State on December 1 in the 2018 Mountain West Conference Football Championship Game. As the Mountain West champion, they received and accepted a bid to the Las Vegas Bowl on December 2. The Bulldogs entered the bowl with a 11–2 record (7–1 in conference). The Bulldogs' last Las Vegas Bowl appearance came in 2013.

== Game summary ==
=== Scoring summary ===
Scoring summary

Quarter	Time	Drive			Team	Scoring information	Score	
Quarter	Time	Plays	Yards	TOP	Team	Scoring information	ASU	FRES
1	7:02	7	45	2:43	FRES	39-yard field goal by Asa Fuller	0	3
1	4:58				FRES	Interception returned 70 yards for touchdown by Anthoula Kelly, Asa Fuller kick good	0	10
1	1:25	9	65	3:33	ASU	Kyle Williams 3-yard touchdown reception from Manny Wilkins, Brandon Ruiz kick good	7	10
2	12:43	8	58	2:28	ASU	Eno Benjamin 17-yard touchdown run, Brandon Ruiz kick good	14	10
2	8:03	9	75	4:40	FRES	Marcus McMaryion 10-yard touchdown run, Asa Fuller kick good	14	17
2	0:51	17	72	7:05	ASU	20-yard field goal by Brandon Ruiz	17	17
3	5:33	7	13	4:04	ASU	44-yard field goal by Brandon Ruiz	20	17
3	1:00	4	80	0:53	FRES	Ronnie Rivers 68-yard touchdown run, Asa Fuller kick good	20	24
4	5:19	7	55	3:19	FRES	Ronnie Rivers 5-yard touchdown run, Asa Fuller kick good	20	31
"TOP" = time of possession. For other American football terms, see Glossary of American football.							20	31

=== Statistics ===
	1	2	3	4	Total
Sun Devils	7	10	3	0	20
No. 21 Bulldogs	10	7	7	7	31

Statistics	ASU	FRES
First downs	18	18
Plays–yards	69–293	64–436
Rushes–yards	38–164	35–260
Passing yards	129	176
Passing: Comp–Att–Int	19–31–2	15–29–2
Time of possession	31:01	28:59

Team	Category	Player	Statistics
Arizona State	Passing	Manny Wilkins	19/31, 129 yds, 1 TD, 2 INT
Arizona State	Rushing	Eno Benjamin	23 car, 118 yds, 1 TD
Arizona State	Receiving	Brandon Aiyuk	9 rec, 61 yds
Fresno State	Passing	Marcus McMaryion	15/29, 176 yds, 2 INT
Fresno State	Rushing	Ronnie Rivers	24 car, 212 yds, 2 TD
Fresno State	Receiving	DeJonte O'Neal	2 rec, 42 yds
