= Casey Tucker =

American football player (born 1995)

No. 50
- Position: Offensive tackle

Personal information
- Born: September 26, 1995 (age 31); Chandler, Arizona, U.S.
- Listed height: 6 ft 6 in (1.98 m)
- Listed weight: 315 lb (143 kg)

Career information
- High school: Hamilton (Chandler)
- College: Stanford; Arizona State
- NFL draft: 2019: undrafted

Career history
- Philadelphia Eagles (2019)*; Detroit Lions (2019)*; Philadelphia Eagles (2020)*; Indianapolis Colts (2021)*; Philadelphia Eagles (2021)*; Denver Broncos (2021)*; Philadelphia Eagles (2021); Denver Broncos (2022)
- * Offseason or practice squad member only

Career NFL statistics
- Games played: 1
- Stats at Pro Football Reference

Casey Shane Tucker (born September 26, 1995) is an American former professional football player who was an offensive tackle in the National Football League (NFL). He played college football for the Stanford Cardinal and Arizona State Sun Devils.

== Early life and college ==
Casey Tucker was born on September 26, 1995, in Chandler, Arizona. He grew up in Gilbert, Arizona before attending Hamilton High School. While at Hamilton, Tucker participated in the 2013 Under Armour All-American Game, and was also invited to the 2014 U.S. Army All-American game. He was later a four-star recruit to Stanford. In his freshman season at Stanford, he played in five games. He played in 14 games the next season as the team's starting right tackle. He played in 8 games the following year, the first two at right tackle and the final six at left. He transferred to Arizona State for his senior year. In October of his senior year, he started in a game against his former team, Stanford. He was selected as an honorable mention all-PAC 12 following the season.

== Professional career ==
=== Philadelphia Eagles (first stint) ===
After going unselected in the 2019 NFL draft, Tucker signed with the Philadelphia Eagles as an undrafted free agent following a successful mini-camp. He was released at roster cuts.

=== Detroit Lions ===
Tucker was signed to the practice squad of the Detroit Lions on October 30, 2019. He was released in November but signed again in December. He signed a reserve/future contract on December 30. Tucker was waived on April 27, 2020.

=== Philadelphia Eagles (second stint) ===
On April 28, 2020, Tucker was signed back to the Eagles off waivers. He was waived on August 23, 2020. He signed to their practice squad on December 21, 2020. On January 4, 2021, he was released for the third time.

=== Indianapolis Colts ===
He signed with the Indianapolis Colts on January 11, 2021. Tucker was released on April 29, 2021.

=== Philadelphia Eagles (third stint) ===
He was signed for the fourth time by the Eagles on May 18, 2021. He was waived/injured on August 17, 2021, and was placed on injured reserve. He was released on August 25, 2021. He re-signed with the Eagles practice squad on September 29, 2021. He was released from the practice squad on October 20, 2021.

=== Denver Broncos (first stint) ===
On November 9, 2021, Tucker was signed to the Denver Broncos practice squad. He was released on December 21, 2021.

=== Philadelphia Eagles (fourth stint) ===
On December 23, 2021, Tucker was signed to the Philadelphia Eagles practice squad. He made his NFL debut against the Dallas Cowboys in week 18.

=== Denver Broncos (second stint) ===
On January 20, 2022, Tucker signed a reserve/future contract with the Denver Broncos. He was waived/injured on August 23, 2022 and placed on injured reserve. He was waived on May 11, 2023.
