= Renell Wren =

American football player (born 1995)

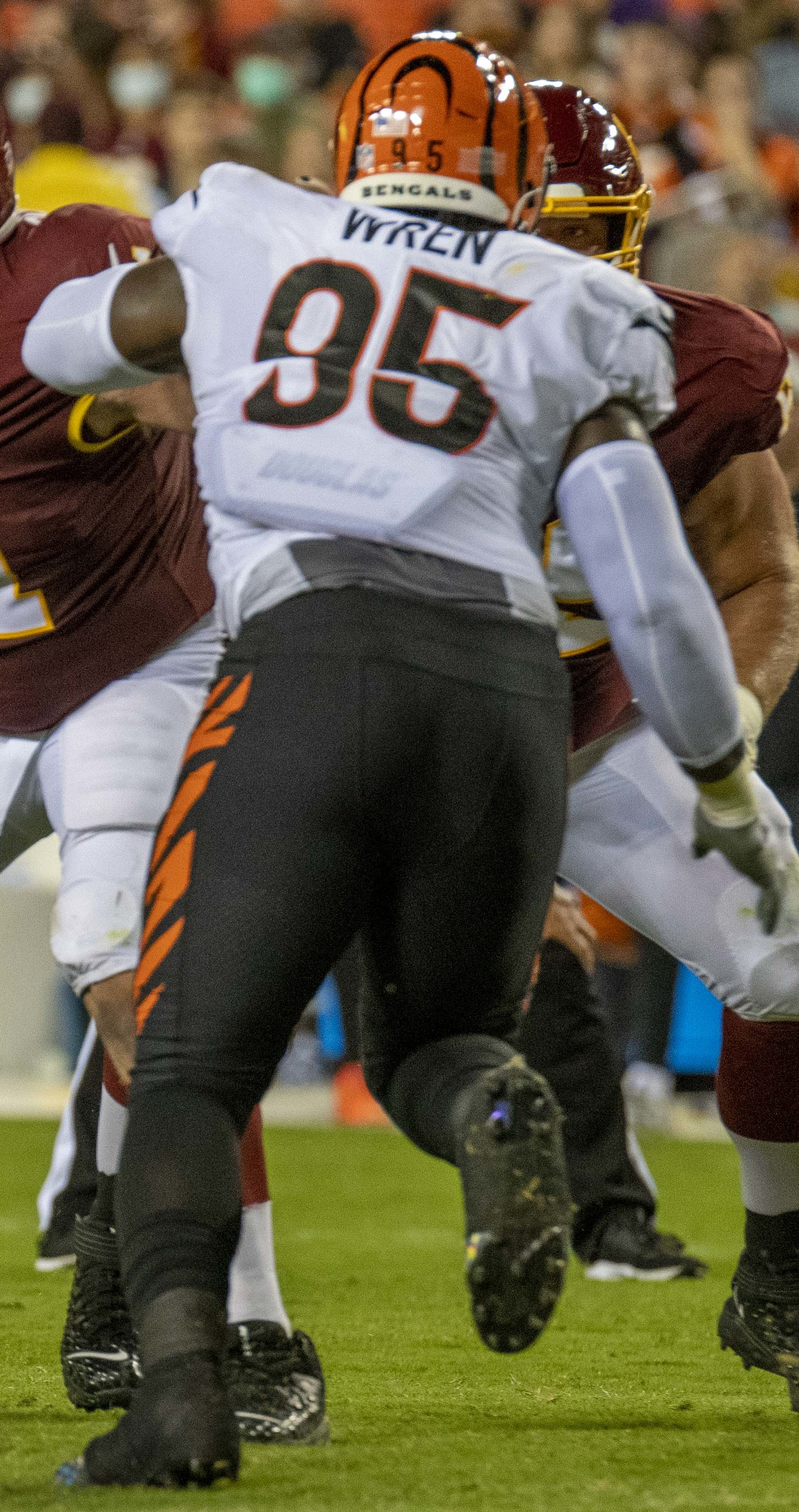
- Wren with the Cincinnati Bengals in 2021

No. 95, 79
- Position: Nose tackle

Personal information
- Born: October 23, 1995 (age 31); St. Louis, Missouri, U.S.
- Listed height: 6 ft 5 in (1.96 m)
- Listed weight: 315 lb (143 kg)

Career information
- High school: Lutheran North (St. Louis)
- College: Arizona State (2014–2018)
- NFL draft: 2019: 4th round, 125th overall pick

Career history
- Cincinnati Bengals (2019–2021); Philadelphia Eagles (2022)*; Pittsburgh Steelers (2022–2023)
- * Offseason or practice squad member only

Career NFL statistics
- Total tackles: 9
- Stats at Pro Football Reference

Renell Wren (born October 23, 1995) is an American former professional football player who was a nose tackle in the National Football League (NFL). He played college football for the Arizona State Sun Devils and was selected by the Cincinnati Bengals in the fourth round of the 2019 NFL draft.

== Professional career ==
Pre-draft measurables
Height	Weight	Arm length	Hand span	40-yard dash	10-yard split	20-yard split	20-yard shuttle	Three-cone drill	Vertical jump	Broad jump	Bench press
6 ft 4 7/8 in (1.95 m)	318 lb (144 kg)	33 7/8 in (0.86 m)	10 in (0.25 m)	5.01 s	1.75 s	2.90 s	4.53 s	7.65 s	32.0 in (0.81 m)	9 ft 10 in (3.00 m)	30 reps
All values from NFL Combine

=== Cincinnati Bengals ===
Wren was selected by the Cincinnati Bengals in the fourth round, 125th overall, of the 2019 NFL draft. He played in 11 games with two starts before being placed on injured reserve on December 14, 2019.

Wren was placed on the active/non-football injury list at the start of training camp on August 3, 2020. He was moved back to the active roster on August 13. He was placed on injured reserve with a quadriceps injury on August 23, 2020.

On August 31, 2021, Wren was waived by the Bengals and re-signed to the practice squad the next day.

=== Philadelphia Eagles ===
On February 25, 2022, Wren signed with the Philadelphia Eagles. He was released on August 30.

=== Pittsburgh Steelers ===
On September 2, 2022, Wren signed to the Pittsburgh Steelers practice squad. He signed a reserve/future contract on January 12, 2023. He was placed on injured reserve on May 16, 2023.
