= Manny Wilkins =

American football player (born 1995)

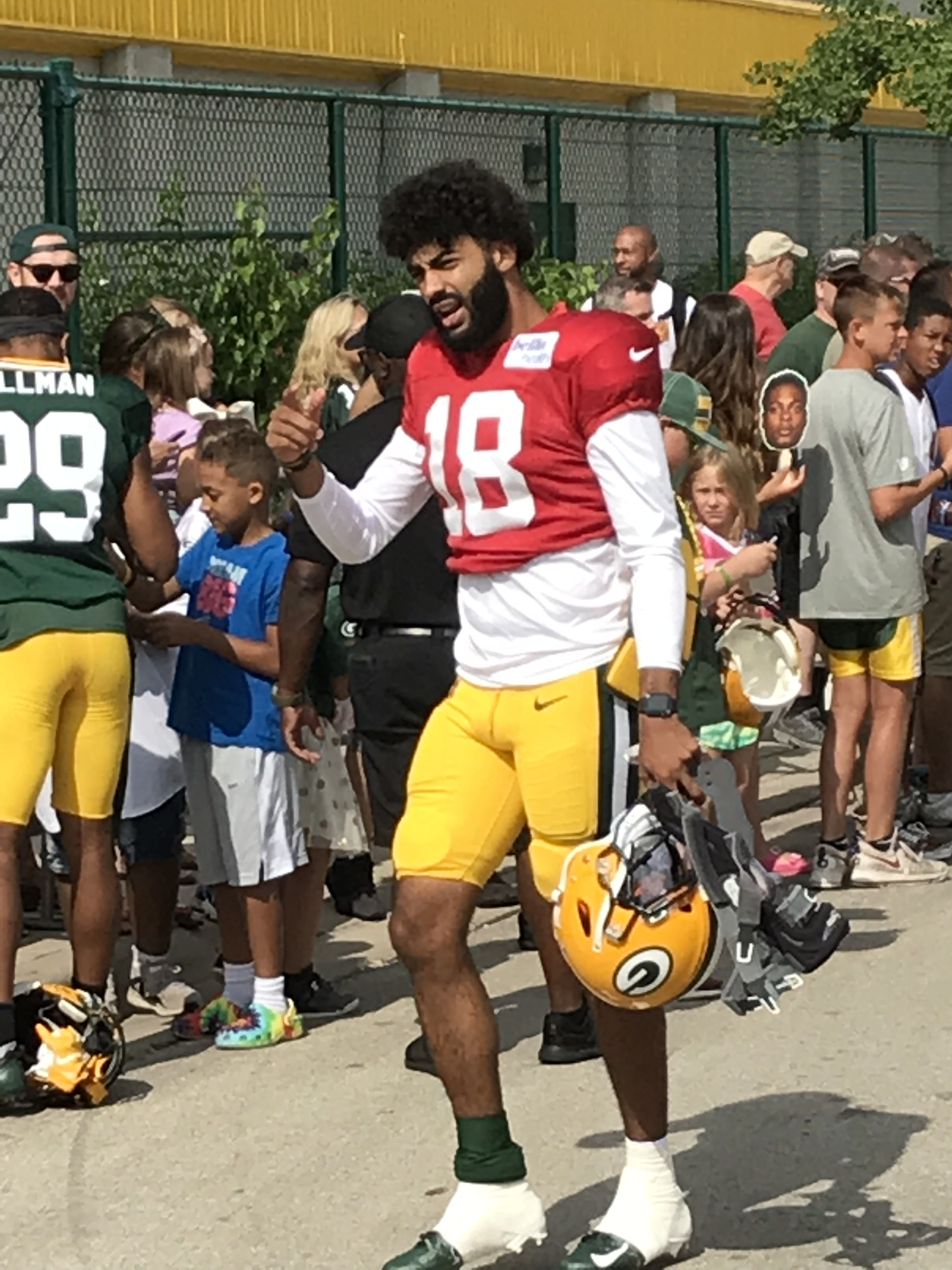
- Wilkins with the Green Bay Packers in 2019

Profile
- Position: Quarterback

Personal information
- Born: November 5, 1995 (age 31); Novato, California, U.S.
- Listed height: 6 ft 2 in (1.88 m)
- Listed weight: 193 lb (88 kg)

Career information
- High school: San Marin (Novato)
- College: Arizona State
- NFL draft: 2019: undrafted

Career history
- Green Bay Packers (2019)*; St. Louis Battlehawks (2023–2025)
- * Offseason or practice squad member only

Manny Wilkins Jr. (born November 5, 1995) is an American professional football quarterback. He played college football for Arizona State. After going undrafted in the 2019 NFL draft, Wilkins signed with the Green Bay Packers of the National Football League (NFL), but was released the following year, in 2020. After a three-year hiatus, in 2023, Wilkins was picked up by the St. Louis Battlehawks, then of the XFL, now of the UFL, where he began as a backup and eventually progressed to the team's starting quarterback.

== Early life ==
When Wilkins was 16, he was identified as a talented prospect.

Wilkins's father, Manny Wilkins Sr., died when Manny was 10 years old in 2006. Wilkins relocated to Texas with his mother in 2008, where he played football at Elkins High School. He relocated back to California to live with his aunt and uncle and started at quarterback while attending San Marin High School in Novato, California.

== College career ==
Wilkins came to Arizona State University as one of the most prolific quarterback prospects in Sun Devils' history. After redshirting his first season, and only appearing in three games in his redshirt freshman campaign, Wilkins won the starting quarterback position, beating out fellow highly touted prospect, Brady White.

In 2015, Wilkins saw limited game action, Wilkins did not throw a pass, but had 7 rushing attempts for 55 yards.

As a sophomore, Wilkins started 10 games beating out Brady White for the starting job in training camp. Wilkins finished the season with 197 completions for 311 attempts for 2329 yards and 12 touchdowns with 9 interceptions. Wilkins also had 128 rushing attempts for 246 yards and 5 touchdowns.

As a junior, Wilkins started all 13 games and had 260 completions on 410 attempts for 3270 yards and 20 touchdowns and 8 interceptions. Wilkins rushed on 138 attempts for 282 yards and 7 touchdowns.

As a senior, Wilkins started all 13 games and had 247 completions and 393 attempts. He threw for 3025 yards for 20 touchdowns and 6 interceptions. Wilkins also rushed on 112 attempts for 452 yards and 8 touchdowns.

=== Statistics ===
Year	Team	Games			Passing								Rushing			
Year	Team	GP	GS	Record	Cmp	Att	Pct	Yds	Avg	TD	INT	Rtg	Att	Yds	Avg	TD
2014	Arizona State	1	0	—	Redshirted (redshirt)											
2015	Arizona State	4	0	—	—	—	—	—	—	—	—	—	7	55	7.9	0
2016	Arizona State	10	10	4–6	197	311	63.3	2,329	7.5	12	9	133.2	128	246	1.9	5
2017	Arizona State	13	13	7–6	260	410	63.4	3,270	8.0	20	8	142.6	138	282	2.0	7
2018	Arizona State	13	13	7–6	247	494	62.8	3,025	7.7	20	6	141.2	112	452	4.0	8
Career		41	36	18−18	704	1,114	63.2	8,624	7.7	52	23	139.5	385	1,035	2.7	20

== Professional career ==
Pre-draft measurables
Height	Weight	Arm length	Hand span	40-yard dash	10-yard split	20-yard split	Vertical jump	Broad jump
6 ft 2 in (1.88 m)	193 lb (88 kg)	32 1/4 in (0.82 m)	9 5/8 in (0.24 m)	4.84 s	1.69 s	2.76 s	33.0 in (0.84 m)	9 ft 11 in (3.02 m)
All values from Pro Day

=== Green Bay Packers ===
Wilkins signed with the Green Bay Packers as an undrafted free agent on May 3, 2019. He was waived on August 31, and was re-signed to the team's practice squad the next day.

Wilkins signed a reserve/future contract with the Packers on January 21, 2020. He was released by the Packers on April 27.

=== St. Louis Battlehawks ===
On February 12, 2023, Wilkins signed with the St. Louis Battlehawks, then of the XFL. He re-signed with the team on February 8, 2024. Wilkins spent the 2024 season as the second-string quarterback behind veteran starter AJ McCarron. He saw action in five games that year, including two as starting quarterback following an injury to McCarron.

On December 20, 2024, Wilkins re-signed with the Battlehawks, now of the UFL. Wilkins began the 2025 season as the starting quarterback until suffering a season-ending Achilles tendon injury in Week 4. He was not retained in the 2026 UFL draft.

== Career statistics ==
Year	Team	League	Games			Passing								Rushing			
Year	Team	League	GP	GS	Record	Cmp	Att	Pct	Yds	Y/A	TD	Int	Rtg	Att	Yds	Avg	TD
2023	STL	XFL	Did not play														
2024	STL	UFL	5	2	1–1	27	50	54.0	305	6.1	1	3	54.2	24	141	5.9	3
2025	STL	UFL	4	4	2–2	45	69	65.2	498	7.2	1	3	73.2	22	136	6.2	2
Career			9	6	3–3	72	119	60.5	803	6.7	2	6	65.2	46	277	6.0	5
