= 2018 First Responder Bowl =

College football bowl game

2018 Servpro First Responder Bowl
- 9th First Responder Bowl; No contest
Boston College Eagles	Boise State Broncos
(7–5)	(10–3)
ACC	Mountain West
Head coach: Steve Addazio	Head coach: Bryan Harsin
	AP / Coaches / CFP; 23 / 24 / 25
- Date: December 26, 2018
- Season: 2018
- Stadium: Cotton Bowl
- Location: Dallas, Texas
- Favorite: Boise State by 3
- Referee: Kevin Mar (Pac-12)
- Payout: US$1,867,000

United States TV coverage
- Network: ESPN
- Announcers: Lowell Galindo, Ahmad Brooks and Kris Budden

The 2018 First Responder Bowl was a college football bowl game scheduled for December 26, 2018, at the Cotton Bowl Stadium in Dallas. It was one of the 2018–19 bowl games concluding the 2018 FBS football season. Sponsored by Servpro, a franchisor of fire and water cleanup and restoration, the game was officially known as the Servpro First Responder Bowl. The ninth overall staging of the bowl, this was the first edition since being rebranded; its prior six editions were the Heart of Dallas Bowl, preceded by the TicketCity Bowl in its first two stagings.

The game was delayed in the first quarter, after Boston College took a 7–0 lead, and went into a weather delay due to lightning. Repeated lightning strikes near the stadium forced further delays; under NCAA rules, any lightning within 8 miles (13 km) of a stadium triggers a mandatory 30-minute delay, and the delay is extended with additional strikes. The game was canceled about two hours later amid forecasts that the severe weather would continue throughout the day and night. The game is considered a no-contest for the teams involved.

This is believed to be the first postseason game at the FBS-level (or its predecessors) that was canceled due to weather. NCAA records reflect only two prior postseason cancellations—a 1941 charity game between San Jose State and Hawaii that was canceled following the attack on Pearl Harbor; and a 2013 Division II game, the C.H.A.M.P.S. Heart of Texas Bowl, between Ouachita Baptist and Tarleton State that was canceled due to severe winter weather.

== Teams ==
Bowl organizers had intended to invite teams from the Big Ten Conference and Conference USA, based on conference tie-ins. However, Boise State from the Mountain West Conference and Boston College from the Atlantic Coast Conference (ACC) were selected, based on the bowl eligibility of teams and other bowl assignments.

This would have been the second all-time meeting between the two schools, with the previous meeting also coming in a bowl game. Boston College defeated Boise State in the 2005 MPC Computers Bowl, 27–21, on Boise State's home field of Bronco Stadium (now known as Albertsons Stadium).

=== Boston College Eagles ===
Boston College received and accepted a bid to the First Responder Bowl on December 2. The Eagles entered the bowl with a 7–5 record (4–4 in conference).

=== Boise State Broncos ===
Boise State was defeated in the 2018 Mountain West Conference Football Championship Game on December 1, then received and accepted a bid to the First Responder Bowl on December 2. The Broncos entered the bowl with a 10–3 record (7–1 in conference).
