= 2018 Utah State Aggies football team =

American college football season

2018 Utah State Aggies football

New Mexico Bowl champion

New Mexico Bowl, W 52–13 vs. North Texas
- Conference: Mountain West Conference
- Mountain Division

Ranking
- Coaches: No. 21
- AP: No. 22
- Record: 11–2 (7–1 MW)
- Head coach: Matt Wells (6th season; regular season); Frank Maile (interim; bowl game)
- Offensive coordinator: David Yost (2nd season)
- Offensive scheme: Spread
- Co-defensive coordinators: Frank Maile (3rd season); Keith Patterson (1st season)
- Base defense: 3–3–5
- Home stadium: Maverik Stadium

Uniform
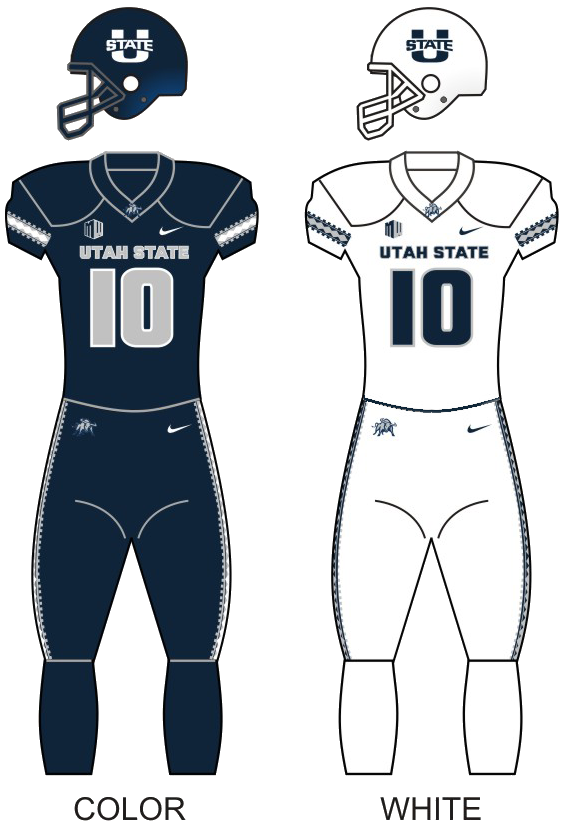

2018 Mountain West Conference football standings
	Conf.			Overall
Team	W		L	W		L
Mountain Division
No. 23 Boise State x	7	–	1	10	–	3
No. 22 Utah State	7	–	1	11	–	2
Wyoming	4	–	4	6	–	6
Air Force	3	–	5	5	–	7
Colorado State	2	–	6	3	–	9
New Mexico	1	–	7	3	–	9
West Division
No. 18 Fresno State x$	7	–	1	12	–	2
Nevada	5	–	3	8	–	5
Hawaii	5	–	3	8	–	6
San Diego State	4	–	4	7	–	6
UNLV	2	–	6	4	–	8
San Jose State	1	–	7	1	–	11
Championship: Fresno State 19, Boise State 16 (OT)
$ – Conference champion; x – Division champion/co-champions; y – Championship game participant; Rankings from AP Poll

The 2018 Utah State Aggies football team represented Utah State University in the 2018 NCAA Division I FBS football season. The Aggies were led by sixth-year head coach Matt Wells during the regular season^{[a]} and played their home games at Merlin Olsen Field at Maverik Stadium. They competed as members of the Mountain Division of the Mountain West Conference. They finished the season 11–2, 7–1 in Mountain West play to finish in a tie for first place in the division with Boise State. Despite the tie, the conference does not credit them as divisional co-champions as a result of the head-to-head loss. They were invited to the New Mexico Bowl where they defeated North Texas. The 11 wins tied a school record.

Head coach Matt Wells was hired by Texas Tech on November 29; the team was led in the New Mexico Bowl by interim head coach and co-defensive coordinator Frank Maile. Wells finished with a 44–34 record in his six seasons at Utah State. On December 9, the school rehired Gary Andersen, six years after he left for Wisconsin.

== Preseason ==
=== Award watch lists ===
Listed in the order that they were released

Award	Player	Position	Year
Rimington Trophy	Quin Ficklin	C	SR
John Mackey Award	Dax Raymond	TE	JR
Lou Groza Award	Dominik Eberle	K	JR
Wuerffel Trophy	Jacoby Wildman	DL	JR

=== Mountain West media days ===
During the Mountain West media days held July 24–25 at the Cosmopolitan on the Las Vegas Strip, the Aggies were predicted to finish in fourth place in the Mountain Division.

==== Preseason All-Mountain West Team ====
The Aggies had two players selected to the preseason all-Mountain West team.

Offense

Dax Raymond – TE

Specialists

Dominik Eberle – K

== Schedule ==
Date	Time	Opponent	Rank	Site	TV	Result	Attendance
August 31	5:00 p.m.	at No. 11 Michigan State*		Spartan Stadium; East Lansing, MI	BTN	L 31–38	73,114
September 8	6:00 p.m.	New Mexico State*		Maverik Stadium; Logan, UT	Stadium	W 60–13	18,223
September 13	6:00 p.m.	Tennessee Tech*		Maverik Stadium; Logan, UT	Stadium	W 73–12	15,011
September 22	8:15 p.m.	Air Force		Maverik Stadium; Logan, UT	ESPN2	W 42–32	22,720
October 5	7:00 p.m.	at BYU*		LaVell Edwards Stadium; Provo, UT (Beehive Boot, The Old Wagon Wheel)	ESPN2	W 45–20	58,087
October 13	2:00 p.m.	UNLV^{†}		Maverik Stadium; Logan, UT	Stadium on Facebook	W 59–28	21,212
October 20	12:30 p.m.	at Wyoming		War Memorial Stadium; Laramie, WY (rivalry)	ATTSNRM	W 24–16	18,378
October 27	2:00 p.m.	New Mexico		Maverik Stadium; Logan, UT	Stadium	W 61–19	16,119
November 3	10:00 p.m.	at Hawaii		Aloha Stadium; Halawa, HI	SPEC HI	W 56–17	21,476
November 10	2:00 p.m.	San Jose State		Maverik Stadium; Logan, UT	Stadium	W 62–24	19,017
November 17	12:00 p.m.	at Colorado State	No. 23	Canvas Stadium; Fort Collins, CO	ATTSNRM	W 29–24	19,226
November 24	8:15 p.m.	at No. 23 Boise State	No. 21	Albertsons Stadium; Boise, ID	ESPN	L 24–33	35,960
December 15	12:00 p.m.	vs. North Texas*		Dreamstyle Stadium; Albuquerque, NM (New Mexico Bowl)	ESPN	W 52–13	25,387
*Non-conference game; ^{†}Homecoming; Rankings from AP Poll and CFP Rankings after October 30 released prior to game; All times are in Mountain time

== Game summaries ==
=== At Michigan State ===
	1	2	3	4	Total
Aggies	7	7	10	7	31
No. 11 Spartans	6	14	7	11	38

=== New Mexico State ===
	1	2	3	4	Total
NMSU Aggies	7	3	3	0	13
USU Aggies	16	17	14	13	60

=== Tennessee Tech ===
	1	2	3	4	Total
Golden Eagles	3	3	3	3	12
Aggies	17	28	7	21	73

=== Air Force ===
	1	2	3	4	Total
Falcons	0	14	3	15	32
Aggies	7	14	14	7	42

=== At BYU ===
	1	2	3	4	Total
Aggies	14	7	14	10	45
Cougars	0	7	6	7	20

=== UNLV ===
	1	2	3	4	Total
Rebels	7	0	7	14	28
Aggies	14	28	7	10	59

=== At Wyoming ===
	1	2	3	4	Total
Aggies	7	3	14	0	24
Cowboys	3	0	10	3	16

=== New Mexico ===
	1	2	3	4	Total
Lobos	3	2	14	0	19
Aggies	28	24	9	0	61

=== At Hawaii ===
	1	2	3	4	Total
No. 18 Aggies	28	0	28	0	56
Rainbow Warriors	3	0	14	0	17

=== San Jose State ===
	1	2	3	4	Total
Spartans	7	3	7	7	24
No. 14 Aggies	10	28	21	3	62

=== At Colorado State ===
	1	2	3	4	Total
No. 14 Aggies	3	7	10	9	29
Rams	0	7	3	14	24

=== At Boise State ===
	1	2	3	4	Total
No. 14 Aggies	7	7	0	10	24
No. 21 Broncos	7	10	3	13	33

=== Vs. North Texas–New Mexico Bowl ===
	1	2	3	4	Total
Mean Green	7	0	6	0	13
Aggies	14	24	7	7	52

== Rankings ==
Ranking movements Legend: ██ Increase in ranking ██ Decrease in ranking — = Not ranked RV = Received votes
	Week															
Poll	Pre	1	2	3	4	5	6	7	8	9	10	11	12	13	14	Final
AP	—	—	—	—	—	—	RV	RV	RV	18	14	14	14	RV	RV	22
Coaches	—	—	—	—	—	—	RV	RV	RV	20	16	13	15	24	23	21
CFP	Not released									—	—	23	21	—	—	Not released

== Players drafted into the NFL ==
Round	Pick	Player	Position	NFL Club
6	214	Darwin Thompson	RB	Kansas City Chiefs
