= 2018 Boise State Broncos football team =

American college football season

2018 Boise State Broncos football

MW Mountain Division champion

MW Championship Game, L 16–19 ^{OT} vs. Fresno State

First Responder Bowl, no contest vs. Boston College
- Conference: Mountain West Conference
- Mountain Division

Ranking
- Coaches: No. 24
- AP: No. 23
- Record: 10–3 (7–1 MW)
- Head coach: Bryan Harsin (5th season)
- Offensive coordinator: Zak Hill (3rd season)
- Offensive scheme: Multiple
- Defensive coordinator: Andy Avalos (3rd season)
- Base defense: Multiple
- Home stadium: Albertsons Stadium

Uniform
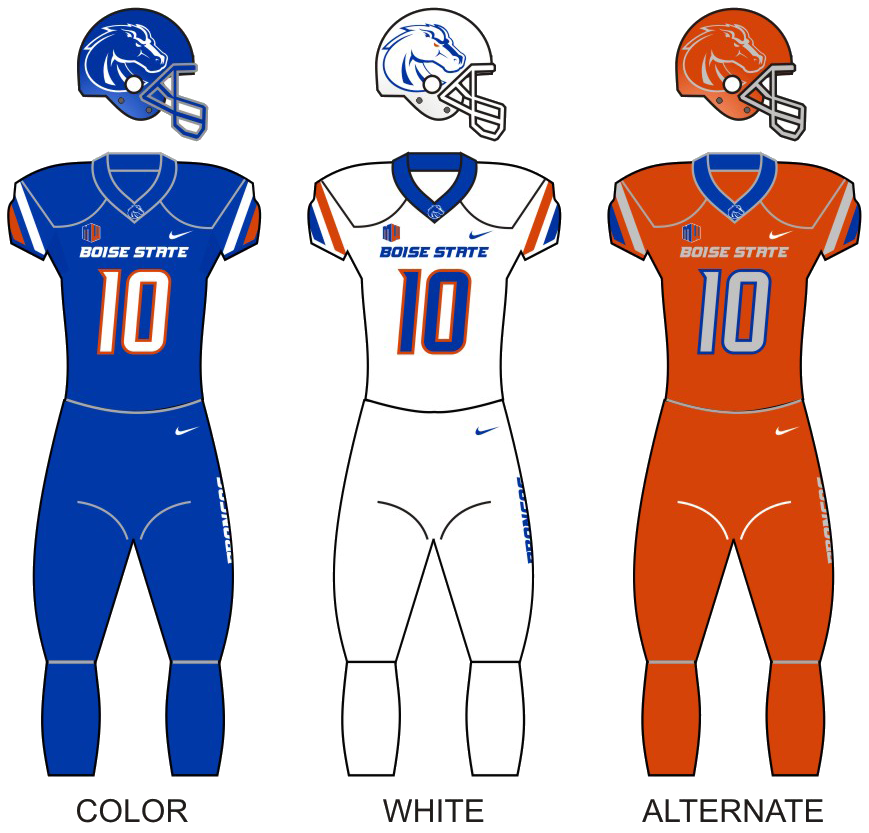

2018 Mountain West Conference football standings
	Conf.			Overall
Team	W		L	W		L
Mountain Division
No. 23 Boise State x	7	–	1	10	–	3
No. 22 Utah State	7	–	1	11	–	2
Wyoming	4	–	4	6	–	6
Air Force	3	–	5	5	–	7
Colorado State	2	–	6	3	–	9
New Mexico	1	–	7	3	–	9
West Division
No. 18 Fresno State x$	7	–	1	12	–	2
Nevada	5	–	3	8	–	5
Hawaii	5	–	3	8	–	6
San Diego State	4	–	4	7	–	6
UNLV	2	–	6	4	–	8
San Jose State	1	–	7	1	–	11
Championship: Fresno State 19, Boise State 16 (OT)
$ – Conference champion; x – Division champion/co-champions; y – Championship game participant; Rankings from AP Poll

The 2018 Boise State Broncos football team represented Boise State University during the 2018 NCAA Division I FBS football season. This season was the Broncos' 82nd season overall, fifth under head coach Bryan Harsin, eighth as a member of the Mountain West Conference and sixth within the Mountain Division. The Broncos played their home games at Albertsons Stadium in Boise, Idaho. They finished the season 10–3, 7–1 in Mountain West play to finish in a tie for first place in the Mountain Division with Utah State. Due to their head-to-head win over Utah State, they were champions of the Mountain Division. They represented the Mountain Division in the Mountain West Championship Game where they lost to West Division champion Fresno State. They were invited to the First Responder Bowl against Boston College. With 5:08 left in the 1st quarter, the bowl game was delayed and ultimately canceled and ruled a no contest.

== Preseason ==
=== Award watch lists ===
Listed in the order that they were released

Award	Player	Position	Year
Lott Trophy	Kekoa Nawahine	S	JR
Bobby Dodd Award	Bryan Harsin	HC	
Chuck Bednarik Award	Tyler Horton	CB	SR
Maxwell Award	Brett Rypien	QB	SR
Davey O'Brien Award	Brett Rypien	QB	SR
Doak Walker Award	Alexander Mattison	RB	JR
John Mackey Award	John Bates	TE	RS SO
Jim Thorpe Award	Kekoa Nawahine	S	JR
Jim Thorpe Award	Tyler Horton	CB	SR
Bronko Nagurski Trophy	Tyler Horton	CB	SR
Bronko Nagurski Trophy	David Moa	DT	SR
Outland Trophy	David Moa	DT	SR
Paul Hornung Award	Avery Williams	CB/KR	RS SO
Wuerffel Trophy	Brett Rypien	QB	SR
Walter Camp Award	Brett Rypien	QB	SR
Ted Hendricks Award	Curtis Weaver	DE	RS SO
Ted Hendricks Award	Durrant Miles	DE	SR
Johnny Unitas Golden Arm Award	Brett Rypien	QB	SR
Manning Award	Brett Rypien	QB	SR

=== Mountain West media days ===
During the Mountain West media days held July 24–25 at the Cosmopolitan on the Las Vegas Strip, the Broncos were unanimously predicted as favorites to win the Mountain Division title.

==== Preseason All-Mountain West Team ====
The Broncos had eight players selected to the preseason all-Mountain West team. Quarterback Brett Rypien was selected as preseason offensive player of the year and kick/punt returner Avery Williams was selected as preseason special teams player of the year.

Offense

Brett Rypien – QB

Alexander Mattison – RB

Ezra Cleveland – OL

John Molchon – OL

Defense

David Moa – DL

Curtis Weaver – DL

Tyler Horton – DB

Specialists

Avery Williams – KR/PR

== Schedule ==
Date	Time	Opponent	Rank	Site	TV	Result	Attendance
September 1	4:00 p.m.	at Troy*	No. 22	Veterans Memorial Stadium; Troy, AL	ESPNews	W 56–20	29,612
September 8	8:15 p.m.	UConn*	No. 20	Albertsons Stadium; Boise, ID	ESPNU	W 62–7	34,515
September 15	1:30 p.m.	at No. 24 Oklahoma State*	No. 17	Boone Pickens Stadium; Stillwater, OK	ESPN	L 21–44	54,974
September 29	5:00 p.m.	at Wyoming		War Memorial Stadium; Laramie, WY	CBSSN	W 34–14	22,271
October 6	1:30 p.m.	San Diego State		Albertsons Stadium; Boise, ID	ESPNU	L 13–19	36,619
October 13	8:30 p.m.	at Nevada		Mackay Stadium; Reno, NV (rivalry)	CBSSN	W 31–27	21,431
October 19	7:00 p.m.	Colorado State		Albertsons Stadium; Boise, ID	ESPN2	W 56–28	32,299
October 27	5:00 p.m.	at Air Force		Falcon Stadium; Colorado Springs, CO	CBSSN	W 48–38	27,753
November 3	8:15 p.m.	BYU*^{†}		Albertsons Stadium; Boise, ID	ESPN2	W 21–16	35,241
November 9	8:15 p.m.	No. 23 Fresno State		Albertsons Stadium; Boise, ID (Battle for the Milk Can)	ESPN2	W 24–17	33,118
November 16	7:00 p.m.	at New Mexico	No. 25	Dreamstyle Stadium; Albuquerque, NM	CBSSN	W 45–14	16,883
November 24	8:15 p.m.	No. 21 Utah State	No. 23	Albertsons Stadium; Boise, ID	ESPN	W 33–24	35,960
December 1	5:45 p.m.	No. 25 Fresno State	No. 22	Albertsons Stadium; Boise, ID (MW Championship Game)	ESPN	L 16–19 ^{OT}	23,662
~~December 26~~	~~11:30 a.m.~~	vs. ~~Boston College~~ *	No. 25	~~Cotton Bowl~~; ~~Dallas, TX~~ ( ~~First Responder Bowl~~ )	~~ESPN~~	Cancelled (Note: The First Responder Bowl was cancelled due to inclement weather.)	
*Non-conference game; ^{†}Homecoming; Rankings from AP Poll and CFP Rankings after October 30 released prior to game; All times are in Mountain time

Schedule source:

== Roster ==
2018 Boise State Broncos football team roster
Players
Coaches
Offense

Pos.	#	Name	Class
WR	1	Octavius Evans	So
WR	2	Khalil Shakir	Fr
QB	3	Riley Smith	Fr
QB	4	Brett Rypien	Sr
TE	5	Garrett Collingham	Jr
WR	6	C. T. Thomas	So
WR	7	A. J. Richardson	Sr
WR	8	Sean Modster	Sr
QB	9	Jaylon Henderson	Jr
QB	10	Chase Cord	Fr
WR	15	Maclaine Griffin	Fr
WR	16	John Hightower	Jr
QB	17	Zach Matlock	Fr
WR	18	Billy Bowens	Fr
RB	21	Andrew Van Buren	Fr
RB	22	Alexander Mattison	Jr
RB	31	Skyler Seibold	Sr
RB	32	Spencer Keene	Fr
RB	34	Robert Mahone	So
RB	37	Danny Smith	Fr
RB	39	Jake Shaddox	Jr
TE	42	Daniel Cantrell	Fr
TE	46	Cody Shoemaker	Jr
TE	47	Matt Pistone	Jr
OL	51	Dalton Lins	Fr
OL	55	Kekaniokoa Holomalia-Gonzalez	Fr
OL	63	Keegan Ulrich	Fr
OL	64	Ben Vering	So
OL	65	Zachary Troughton	Sr
OL	66	Isiah Moore	Jr
OL	67	Garrett Larson	Jr
OL	68	Jake Stetz	Fr
OL	69	Austin Dixon	So
OL	70	John Ojukwu	Fr
OL	71	Donte Harrington	So
OL	72	Dallas Holliday	Fr
OL	73	Nick Crabtree	So
OL	74	Garrett Curran	Fr
OL	75	Kole Bailey	So
OL	76	Ezra Cleveland	So
OL	77	John Molchon	Jr
OL	78	Andres Preciado	Sr
OL	79	Eric Quevedo	Jr
WR	81	Akilian Butler	Jr
WR	82	Stefan Cobbs	Fr
WR	83	Damon Cole	Fr
TE	84	Cole Ramseyer	Fr
TE	85	John Bates	So
TE	86	Chase Blakley	Sr
TE	87	Kaden DeLuna	Fr
TE	88	Tyneil Hopper	Fr
WR	89	Connor Riddle	Fr

Defense

Pos.	#	Name	Class
OLB	3	Brandon Hawkins	Fr
S	4	DeAndre Pierce	Jr
S	5	Evan Tyler	Jr
MLB	7	Ezekiel Noa	Fr
DE	8	Jabril Frazier	Sr
OLB	9	Desmond Williams	So
S	10	Kekoa Nawahine	Jr
CB	13	Marques Evans	Fr
CB	14	Tyler Horton	Sr
CB	15	Jalen Walker	So
MLB	17	Phillip Mills	Fr
DE	19	Aisa Kelemete	Fr
OLB	20	Roman Kafentzis	Fr
CB	21	Tyreque Jones	Fr
CB	22	Tyric LeBeauf	Fr
S	23	Damion Wright	Jr
S	24	Ryan Swanson	Fr
MLB	25	Benton Wickersham	So
CB	26	Avery Williams	So
CB	28	Kekaula Kaniho	So
CB	29	Chris Mitchell	Fr
CB	30	Robert Lewis	So
S	31	K. J. Walker	Jr
S	32	Jordan Happle	So
MLB	33	Tony Lashley	Sr
DE	35	Kukea Emmsley	Fr
OLB	36	Blake Whitlock	Sr
DE	38	Demitri Washington	Fr
DT	40	Jabari Watson	So
OLB	41	Will Heffner	Jr
S	42	Mujeeb Rufai	Fr
MLB	43	Joe Provenzano	Sr
OLB	44	Riley Whimpey	So
DE	45	Kayode Rufai	So
MLB	48	Bruno DeRose	So
DE	49	Dylan Herberg	Fr
MLB	52	D. J. Schramm	Fr
DE	53	Sam Whitney	Jr
DT	54	Matt Locher	Jr
DT	55	David Moa	Sr
MLB	56	Joseph Inda	Sr
DT	57	Emmanuel Fesili	Jr
MLB	58	Tyson Maeva	Jr
DE	60	Isaiah Grover	Fr
DT	62	Scott Matlock	Fr
DT	90	Scale Igiehon	Fr
DE	91	Durrant Miles	Sr
DT	92	Paul Semons	Sr
DT	93	Chase Hatada	Jr
OLB	95	Nick Provenzano	So
DT	97	Keeghan Freeborn	Fr
DT	98	Sonatane Lui	Jr
DE	99	Curtis Weaver	So

Special teams

Pos.	#	Name	Class
K/P	46	Joel Velazquez	So
P	49	Quinn Skillin	Sr
LS	50	Nicholai Pitman	Jr
K	80	Max Meyers	Fr
LS	94	Blake Biby	So
K	96	Haden Hoggarth	Sr

Head coach

- Bryan Harsin

Coordinators/assistant coaches

- Kent Riddle – Associate head coach/Special teams coordinator/Tight ends
- Zak Hill – Offensive coordinator/Quarterbacks
- Andy Avalos – Defensive coordinator
- Lee Marks – Running backs
- Spencer Danielson – Outside linebackers
- Eric Kiesau – Wide receivers
- Jeff Popovich – Cornerbacks
- Brad Bedell – Offensive linemen
- Chad Kauha'aha'a – Defensive linemen
- Gabe Franklin – Safeties
- Jeff Pitman – Director, Strength and Conditioning
- Matt Coombs – Special teams analyst
- Mitch Dahlen – Graduate assistant
- Dustin Kamper – Graduate assistant
- Kharyee Marshall – Graduate assistant
- Derek Schouman – Graduate assistant

Legend

- (C) Team captain
- (S) Suspended
- (I) Ineligible
- Injured
- Redshirt

Roster
Last update: 8/12/23

== Game summaries ==
=== At Troy ===
Boise State at Troy

Team	1	2	3	4	Total
• No. 22 Broncos	14	21	7	14	56
Troy	7	0	7	6	20

- Date: September 1, 2018
- Location: Veterans Memorial Stadium
  Troy, AL
- Game start: 4:00 p.m. MDT
- Game attendance: 29,612
- Game weather: Temperature: 86 °F (30 °C) • Weather: Clear • Wind: 6 MPH
- Referee: David Alvarez
- TV announcers (ESPNews): Dave LaMont, Ray Bentley

Scoring summary
1	10:53	BSU	Sean Modster 20-yard pass from Brett Rypien (Hadden Hoggarth kick)	BSU 7–0
1	5:53	TROY	Jabir Daughtry-Frye 23-yard run (Tyler Sumpter kick)	Tied 7–7
1	:36	BSU	CT Thomas 53-yard pass from Brett Rypien (Haden Hoggarth kick)	BSU 14–7
2	12:35	BSU	Alexander Mattison 7-yardrun (Haden Hoggarth kick)	BSU 21–7
2	7:10	BSU	Akilian Butler 3-yard pass from Brett Rypien (Haden Hoggarth kick)	BSU 28–7
2	2:13	BSU	Sean Modster 54-yard pass from Brett Rypien (Haden Hoggarth kick)	BSU 35–7
3	10:56	BSU	Tyler Horton 55-yard fumble return (Haden Hoggarth kick)	BSU 42–7
3	5:10	TROY	B.J. Smith 1-yard run (Tyler Sumpter Kick)	BSU 42–14
4	11:37	TROY	Deondre Douglas 33-yard pass from Kaleb Barker (two-point conversion failed)	BSU 42–20
4	8:40	BSU	Tyler Horton 11-yard fumble return (Haden Hoggarth kick)	BSU 49–20
4	5:04	BSU	Chase Cord 44-yard run (Haden Hoggarth kick)	BSU 56–20

Uniform Combination
Helmet	Jersey	Pants

- Passing leaders: Brett Rypien (BSU): 20–28, 305 YDS, 4 TD; Kaleb Barker (Troy): 20–29, 211 YDS, 1 TD, 1 INT.
- Rushing leaders: Alexander Mattison (BSU): 14 CAR, 56 YDS, 1 TD; Jabir Frye (Troy): 7 CAR, 41 YDS, 1 TD.
- Receiving leaders: Sean Modster (BSU): 7 REC, 167 YDS 2 TD; Deondre Douglas (Troy): 7 REC, 102 YDS, 1 TD.

Senior cornerback Tyler Horton, who finished the game with four tackles and two fumble recoveries which were both returned for touchdowns, was named Mountain West Defensive Player of the Week. Horton was also named the Bronko Nagurski Trophy National Defensive Player of the Week.

Statistics	Boise State	Troy
Total yards	416	379
Passing yards	305	355
Rushing yards	111	124
First downs	16	21
Penalties	4-27	3-25
Turnovers	1	4
Time of possession	23:29	34:31

=== UConn ===
UConn at Boise State

Team	1	2	3	4	Total
Huskies	0	0	7	0	7
• No. 20 Broncos	24	17	14	7	62

- Date: September 8, 2018
- Location: Albertsons Stadium
  Boise, ID
- Game start: 8:15 p.m. MDT
- Game attendance: 34,515
- Game weather: Temperature: 78 °F (26 °C) • Weather: Clear • Wind: 5 MPH SSE
- Referee: C. Lamertina
- TV announcers (ESPNU): Mike Couzens, Kirk Morrison

Scoring summary
1	9:42	BSU	Haden Hoggarth 20 yd FG	BSU 0–3
1	7:13	BSU	John Hightower 67 Yd pass from Brett Rypien (Haden Hoggarth kick)	BSU 0–10
1	4:25	BSU	John Bates 24 Yd pass from Brett Rypien (Haden Hoggarth kick)	BSU 0–17
1	:45	BSU	Alexander Mattison 1 Yd Run (Haden Hoggarth Kick)	BSU 0–24
2	11:58	BSU	John Hightower 55 Yd Run (Haden Hoggarth kick)	BSU 0–31
2	2:04	BSU	Alexander Mattison 9 Yd Run (Haden Hoggarth kick)	BSU 0–38
2	:02	BSU	Haden Hoggarth 44 Yd FG	BSU 0–41
3	14:40	BSU	A.J. Richardson 74 Yd pass from Brett Rypien (Tyler Sumpter Kick)	BSU 0–48
3	5:52	UCONN	Aaron McLean 15 Yd pass from David Pindell (Michael Tarbutt Kick)	BSU 7–48
3	3:11	BSU	Andrew Van Buren 3 Yd Run (Haden Hoggarth Kick)	BSU 7–55
4	10:12	BSU	Akilian Butler 24 Yd pass from Chase Cord (Haden Hoggarth Kick)	BSU 7–62

Uniform Combination
Helmet	Jersey	Pants

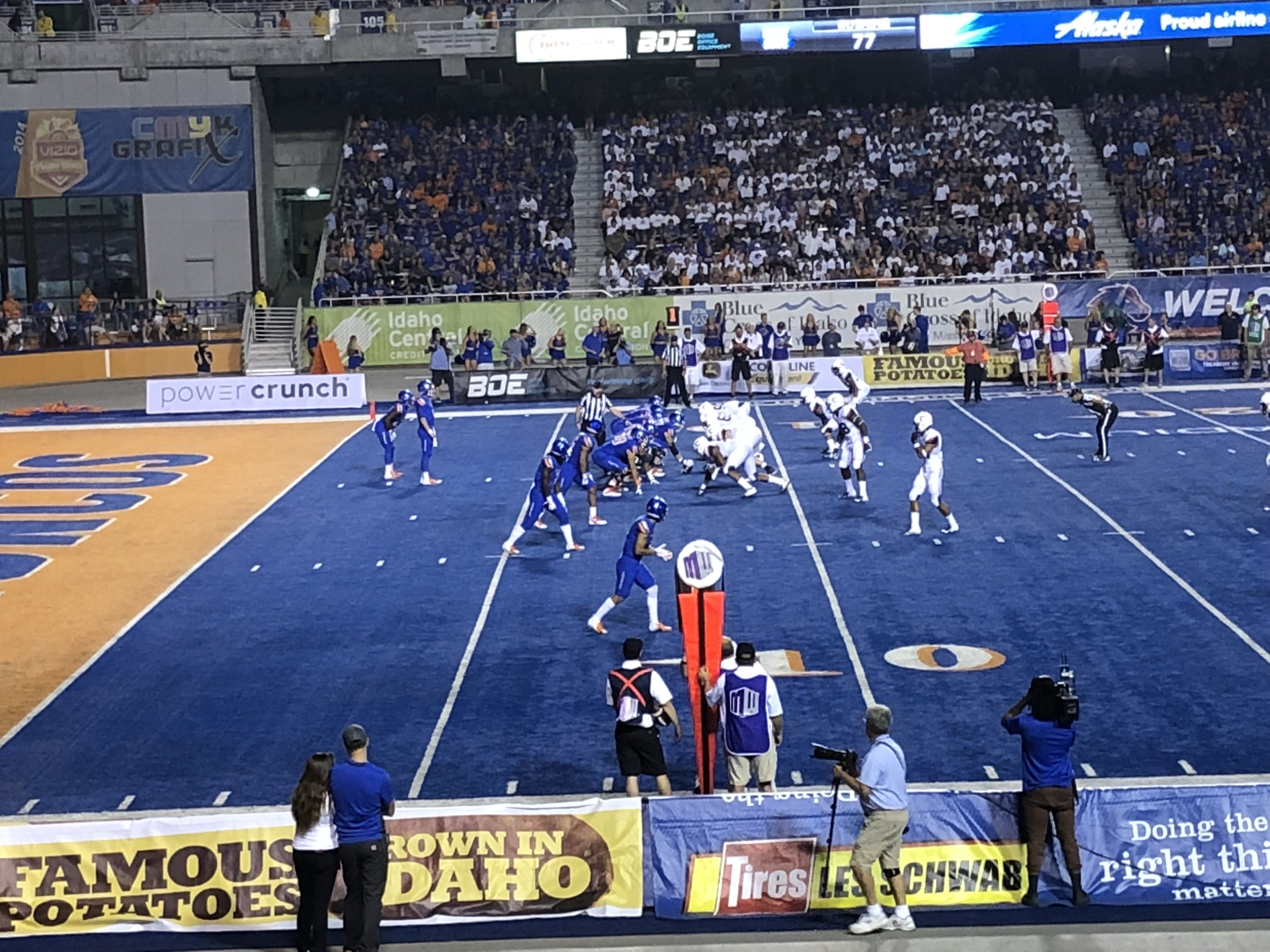
Boise State on offense in the 2nd quarter.

- Passing leaders: Brett Rypien (BSU): 21–28, 362 YDS, 3 TD; David Pindell (UCONN): 11–21, 71 YDS, 1 TD, 1 INT.
- Rushing leaders: Alexander Mattison (BSU): 11 CAR, 115 YDS, 2 TD; Kevin Mensah (UCONN): 82 CAR.
- Receiving leaders: John Hightower (BSU): 5 REC, 119 YDS, 1 TD; Hergy Mayala (UCONN): 3 REC, 24 YDS

The Broncos set a school record for offensive yards in a game with 818 yards. The previous record was 742 set against Colorado State in 2011. Quarterback Brett Rypien was named Mountain West Offensive Player of the Week.

Statistics	UConn	Boise State
Total yards	193	818
Passing yards	71	418
Rushing yards	172	400
First downs	9	38
Penalties	7-44	7-71
Turnovers	1	0
Time of possession	21:59	38:01

=== At Oklahoma State ===
Boise State at Oklahoma State

Team	1	2	3	4	Total
No. 17 Broncos	0	7	14	0	21
• No. 24 Cowboys	0	17	17	10	44

- Date: September 15, 2018
- Location: Boone Pickens Stadium
  Stillwater, OK
- Game start: 1:30 p.m. MDT
- Elapsed time: 3:24
- Game attendance: 54,974
- Game weather: Temperature: 86 °F (30 °C) • Weather: Partly Cloudy • Wind: 6 MPH S
- Referee: Scott Campbell
- TV announcers (ESPN): Adam Amin, Rod Gilmore, Quint Kessenich

Scoring summary
2	14:20	BSU	John Hightower 31 Yd pass from Brett Rypien (Haden Hoggarth kick)	BSU 7–0
2	12:08	OKST	Justice Hill 8 Yd Run (Matt Ammendola kick)	Tied 7–7
2	8:43	OKST	Taylor Cornelius 1 Yd Run (Matt Ammendola kick)	OKST 7–14
2	2:12	OKST	Matt Ammendola 22 Yd FG	OKST 7–17
3	13:03	OKST	Matt Ammendola 48 Yd FG	OKST 7–20
3	9:18	BSU	A.J. Richardson 34 Yd pass from Brett Rypien (Haden Hoggarth kick)	OKST 14–20
3	6:40	OKST	Dillon Stoner 32 Yd pass from Taylor Cornelius (Matt Ammendola kick)	OKST 14–27
3	5:11	OKST	Za'Carrius Green 13 Yd Return of Blocked Punt (Matt Ammendola kick)	OKST 14–34
3	1:30	BSU	Chase Blakley 5 Yd pass from Brett Rypien (Haden Hoggarth Kick)	OKST 21–34
4	11:07	OKST	Matt Ammendola 23 Yd FG	OKST 21–37
4	4:16	OKST	Taylor Cornelius 6 Yd Run (Matt Ammendola Kick)	OKST 21–44

Uniform Combination
Helmet	Jersey	Pants

- Passing leaders: Brett Rypien (BSU): 39–56, 380 YDS, 3 TD; Taylor Cornelius (OKST): 15–26, 243 YDS, 1 TD.
- Rushing leaders: Alexander Mattison (BSU): 14 CAR, 53 YDS; Justice Hill (OKST): 15 CAR, 123 YDS, 1 TD.
- Receiving leaders: A. J. Richardson (BSU): 6 REC, 70 YDS, 1 TD; Tylan Wallace (OKST): 5 REC, 105 YDS.

Statistics	Boise State	Oklahoma State
Total yards	414	442
Passing yards	380	246
Rushing yards	34	176
First downs	23	19
Penalties	5-40	4-25
Turnovers	1	0
Time of possession	34:34	25:26

=== At Wyoming ===
Boise State at Wyoming

Team	1	2	3	4	Total
• Broncos	7	17	3	7	34
Cowboys	0	0	7	7	14

- Date: September 29, 2018
- Location: War Memorial Stadium
  Laramie, WY
- Game start: 5:00 p.m. MDT
- Elapsed time: 3:30
- Game attendance: 22,271
- Game weather: Temperature: 70 °F (21 °C) • Weather: Hazy • Wind: 16 MPH W
- Referee: Kevin Boitmann
- TV announcers (CBSSN): Carter Blackburn, Jay Feely, John Schriffen

Scoring summary
1	9:39	BSU	Alexander Mattison 13 Yd Run (Haden Hoggarth kick)	BSU 7–0
2	11:02	BSU	A.J. Richardson 21 Yd pass from Brett Rypien (Haden Hoggarth Kick)	BSU 14–0
2	5:42	BSU	Khalil Shakir 2 Yd Run (Haden Hoggarth Kick)	BSU 21–0
2	0:35	BSU	Haden Hoggarth 30 Yd Field Goal	BSU 24–0
3	14:49	WYO	Nico Evans 75 Yd Run (Cooper Rothe Kick)	BSU 24–7
3	9:23	BSU	Haden Hoggarth 33 Yd Field Goal	BSU 27–7
4	6:29	BSU	John Hightower 41 Yd pass from Brett Rypien	BSU 34–7
4	5:47	WYO	James Price 72 Yd pass from Tyler Vander Waal	BSU 34–14

Uniform Combination
Helmet	Jersey	Pants

- Passing leaders: Brett Rypien (BSU): 28–42, 342 YDS, 2 TD; Tyler Vander Waal (WYO): 15–25, 214 YDS, 1 TD.
- Rushing leaders: Alexander Mattison (BSU): 20 CAR, 57 YDS, 1 TD; Nico Evans (WYO): 12 CAR, 141 YDS, 1 TD.
- Receiving leaders: A.J. Richardson (BSU): 6 REC, 113 YDS, 1 TD; James Price (WYO): 2 REC, 77 YDS, 1 TD.

Statistics	Boise State	Wyoming
Total yards	506	295
Passing yards	345	214
Rushing yards	161	81
First downs	29	11
Penalties	9-71	6-59
Turnovers	0	1
Time of possession	40:13	19:47

=== San Diego State ===
San Diego State at Boise State

Team	1	2	3	4	Total
• Aztecs	3	10	0	6	19
Broncos	7	0	0	6	13

- Date: October 6, 2018
- Location: Albertsons Stadium
  Boise, ID
- Game start: 1:30 p.m. MDT
- Elapsed time: 3:23
- Game attendance: 36,679
- Game weather: Temperature: 57 °F (14 °C) • Weather: Cloudy • Wind: 3 MPH WNW
- Referee: Brad Van Vark
- TV announcers (ESPNU): Mike Couzens, Kirk Morrison, Tom Scofield

Scoring summary
1	9:14	SDSU	John Baron II 36 Yd Field Goal	SDSU 3–0
1	6:48	BSU	Alexander Mattison 1 Yd Run (Joel Velazquez Kick)	BSU 3–7
2	13:09	SDSU	John Baron II 41 Yd Field Goal	BSU 6–7
2	4:36	SDSU	Chase Jasmin 2 Yd Run (John Baron II Kick)	SDSU 13–7
4	10:10	SDSU	Jordan Byrd 72 Yd Run (Two-Point Pass Conversion Failed)	SDSU 19–7
4	3:05	BSU	Alexander Mattison 1 Yd Run (Joel Velazquez PAT failed)	SDSU 19–13

Uniform Combination
Helmet	Jersey	Pants

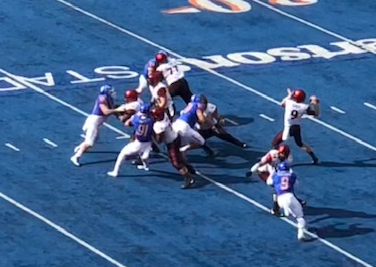
Boise State on defense in the 2nd quarter.

- Passing leaders: Brett Rypien (BSU): 21–41, 170 YDS, 2 INT; Ryan Agnew (SDSU): 8–15, 113 YDS.
- Rushing leaders: Alexander Mattison (BSU): 25 CAR, 66 YDS, 2 TD; Chase Jasmin (SDSU): 26 CAR, 78 YDS, 1 TD.
- Receiving leaders: Sean Modster (BSU): 4 REC, 44 YDS; Fred Trevillion (SDSU): 3 REC, 57 YDS.

Statistics	San Diego State	Boise State
Total yards	267	229
Passing yards	113	178
Rushing yards	154	51
First downs	9	15
Penalties	8-55	6-52
Turnovers	2	3
Time of possession	30:52	29:08

=== At Nevada ===
Boise State at Nevada
(rivalry)

Team	1	2	3	4	Total
• Broncos	7	10	14	0	31
Wolf Pack	10	7	10	0	27

- Date: October 13, 2018
- Location: Mackay Stadium
  Reno, NV
- Game start: 8:30 p.m. MDT
- Elapsed time: 3:38
- Game attendance: 21,431
- Game weather: Temperature: 60 °F (16 °C) • Weather: Cool and breezy • Wind: 9 MPH NNE
- Referee: Cal McNeill
- TV announcers (CBSSN): Rich Waltz, Aaron Murray, Cassie Mckinney

Scoring summary
1	11:44	NEV	Ramiz Ahmed 35 Yd Field Goal	NEV 0–3
1	6:25	BSU	John Hightower 88 Yd Run (Haden Hoggarth Kick)	BSU 7–3
1	2:17	NEV	Jaxson Kincaide 21 Yd Run (Ramiz Ahmed Kick)	NEV 7–10
2	13:49	BSU	Tyler Horton 99 Yd Interception Return (Haden Hoggarth Kick)	BSU 14–10
2	0:42	NEV	Elijah Cooks 11 Yd pass from Ty Gangi (Ramiz Ahmed Kick)	NEV 14–17
2	0:00	BSU	Haden Hoggarth 31 Yd Field Goal	Tied 17–17
3	10:12	BSU	CT Thomas 36 Yd pass from Brett Rypien (Haden Hoggarth Kick)	BSU 24–17
3	6:51	NEV	McLane Mannix 50 Yd pass from Ty Gangi (Ramiz Ahmed Kick)	Tied 24–24
3	5:37	BSU	A.J. Richardson 41 Yd pass from Brett Rypien (Haden Hoggarth Kick)	BSU 31–24
3	1:21	NEV	Ramiz Ahmed 28 Yd Field Goal	BSU 31–27

Uniform Combination
Helmet	Jersey	Pants

- Passing leaders: Brett Rypien (BSU): 28–38, 299 YDS, 2 TD, 3 INT; Ty Gangi (NEV): 24–42, 304 YDS, 2 TD, 1 INT.
- Rushing leaders: Alexander Mattison (BSU): 24 CAR, 69 YDS; Kelton Moore (NEV): 8 CAR, 35 YDS.
- Receiving leaders: A.J. Richardson (BSU): 4 REC, 79 YDS, 1 TD; McLane Mannix (NEV): 4 REC, 109 YDS, 1 TD.

Statistics	Boise State	Nevada
Total yards	506	386
Passing yards	299	304
Rushing yards	207	82
First downs	24	23
Penalties	9-108	4-20
Turnovers	4	3
Time of possession	35:09	24:51

=== Colorado State ===
Colorado State at Boise State

Team	1	2	3	4	Total
Rams	0	7	7	14	28
• Broncos	21	14	7	14	56

- Date: October 19, 2018
- Location: Albertsons Stadium
  Boise, ID
- Game start: 7:00 p.m. MDT
- Game attendance: 32,299
- Game weather: Temperature: 64 °F (18 °C) • Weather: Clear • Wind: 4 MPH WNW
- Referee: M. VanderVelde
- TV announcers (ESPN2): Jason Benetti, Kelly Stouffer, Olivia Dekker

Scoring summary
1	12:39	BSU	A.J. Richardson 13 Yd pass from Brett Rypien (Haden Hoggarth kick)	BSU 0–7
1	4:15	BSU	A.J. Richardson 35 Yd pass from Brett Rypien (Haden Hoggarth Kick)	BSU 0–14
1	0:00	BSU	Kekaula Kaniho 74 Yd Punt Return (Haden Hoggarth Kick)	BSU 0–21
2	0:35	BSU	Alexander Mattison 3 Yd Run (Haden Hoggarth Kick)	BSU 0–28
2	0:24	BSU	Sean Modster 17 Yd pass from Brett Rypien (Haden Hoggarth Kick)	BSU 0–35
2	0:02	CSU	Preston Williams 47 Yd pass from K.J. Carta-Samuels (Wyatt Bryan Kick)	BSU 7–35
3	6:13	CSU	Warren Jackson 8 Yd pass from K.J. Carta-Samuels (Wyatt Bryan Kick)	BSU 14–35
3	3:09	BSU	Garrett Collingham 4 Yd Run (Haden Hoggarth Kick)	BSU 14–42
4	11:45	BSU	Sean Modster 25 Yd pass from Brett Rypien (Haden Hoggarth Kick)	BSU 14–49
4	9:01	CSU	Warren Jackson 10 Yd pass from Collin Hill (Wyatt Bryan Kick)	BSU 21–49
4	8:54	BSU	Avery Williams 44 Yd Kickoff Return (Haden Hoggarth Kick)	BSU 21–56
4	4:48	CSU	Izzy Matthews 5 Yd Run (Wyatt Bryan Kick)	BSU 28–56

Uniform Combination
Helmet	Jersey	Pants

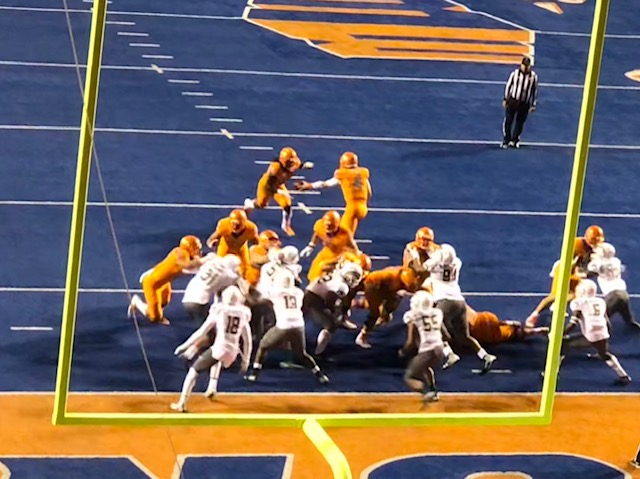
Alexander Mattison receiving a hand off that led to his 2nd quarter touchdown.

- Passing leaders: Brett Rypein (BSU): 22–26, 308 YDS, 4 TD; K. J. Carta-Samuels (CSU): 19–30, 244 YDS, 2 TD, 2 INT.
- Rushing leaders: Alexander Mattison (BSU): 20 CAR, 85 YDS, 1 TD; Izzy Matthews (CSU): 12 CAR, 109 YDS, 1 TD.
- Receiving leaders: A.J. Richardson (BSU): 6 REC, 137 YDS, 2 TD; Preston Williams (CSU): 9 REC, 154 YDS, 1 TD.

Statistics	Colorado State	Boise State
Total yards	489	472
Passing yards	373	322
Rushing yards	116	150
First downs	27	26
Penalties	7-60	5-40
Turnovers	3	0
Time of possession	28:42	31:18

=== At Air Force ===
Boise State at Air Force

Team	1	2	3	4	Total
• Broncos	14	14	10	10	48
Falcons	7	21	3	7	38

- Date: October 27, 2018
- Location: Falcon Stadium
  Colorado Springs, CO
- Game start: 5:00 p.m. MDT
- Elapsed time: 3:24
- Game attendance: 27,753
- Game weather: Temperature: 62 °F (17 °C) • Weather: Clear • Wind: 5 MPH N
- Referee: Brandon Cruse
- TV announcers (CBSSN): Rich Waltz, Steve Beuerlein, Cassie Mckinney

Scoring summary
1	12:52	BSU	John Hightower 44 Yd pass from Brett Rypien (Haden Hoggarth Kick)	BSU 7–0
1	9:57	AF	Cole Fagan 17 Yd Run (Jake Koehnke Kick)	Tied 7–7
1	5:56	BSU	John Hightower 18 Yd pass from Brett Rypien (Haden Hoggarth Kick)	BSU 14–7
2	14:56	AF	Marcus Bennett 20 Yd pass from Isaiah Sanders (Jake Koehnke Kick)	Tied 14–14
2	11:38	BSU	A.J. Richardson 21 Yd pass from Brett Rypien (Haden Hoggarth Kick)	BSU 21–14
2	9:30	AF	Isaiah Sanders 5 Yd Run (Jake Koehnke Kick)	Tied 21–21
2	1:12	AF	Andrew Smith 32 Yd pass from Joseph Saucier (Jake Koehnke Kick)	AF 21–28
2	0:05	BSU	CT Thomas 35 Yd pass from Brett Rypien (Haden Hoggarth Kick)	Tied 28–28
3	8:22	BSU	Haden Hoggarth 30 Yd Field Goal	BSU 31–28
3	6:04	BSU	Alexander Mattison 1 Yd Run (Haden Hoggarth Kick)	BSU 38–28
3	0:20	AF	Jake Koehnke 38 Yd Field Goal	BSU 38–31
4	12:14	BSU	Haden Hoggarth 47 Yd Field Goal (Jake Koehnke Kick)	BSU 41–31
4	5:24	AF	Kadin Remsberg 5 Yd pass from Isaiah Sanders (Jake Koehnke Kick)	BSU 41–38
4	3:21	BSU	John Hightower 61 Yd pass from Brett Rypien (Haden Hoggarth Kick)	BSU 48–38

Uniform Combination
Helmet	Jersey	Pants

- Passing leaders: Brett Rypien (BSU): 20–34, 399 YDS, 5 TD; Isaiah Sanders (AF): 10–15, 210 YDS, 2 TD.
- Rushing leaders: Alexander Mattison (BSU): 22 CAR, 136 YDS, 1 TD; Isaiah Sanders (AF): 28 CAR, 97 YDS, 1 TD.
- Receiving leaders: John Hightower (BSU): 8 REC, 182 YDS, 3 TD; Joseph Saucier (AF): 2 REC, 77 YDS.

Statistics	Boise State	Air Force
Total yards	530	443
Passing yards	409	242
Rushing yards	121	201
First downs	26	23
Penalties	1-15	4-25
Turnovers	0	0
Time of possession	27:09	32:51

=== BYU ===
BYU at Boise State

Team	1	2	3	4	Total
Cougars	0	6	7	3	16
• Broncos	14	0	7	0	21

- Date: November 3, 2018
- Location: Albertsons Stadium
  Boise, ID
- Game start: 8:15 p.m. MDT
- Elapsed time: 3:27
- Game attendance: 35,241
- Game weather: Temperature: 49 °F (9 °C) • Weather: Mostly cloudy • Wind: 6 MPH W
- Referee: Eddy Shelton
- TV announcers (ESPN2): Kevin Brown, Andre Ware, Alex Corddry

Scoring summary
1	9:27	BSU	Alexander Mattison 1 Yd Run (Haden Hoggarth Kick)	BSU 0–7
1	0:54	BSU	A.J. Richardson 7 Yd pass from Brett Rypien (Haden Hoggarth Kick)	BSU 0–14
2	9:08	BYU	Skyler Southam 26 Yd Field Goal	BSU 3–14
2	4:58	BYU	Skyler Southam 43 Yd Field Goal	BSU 6–14
3	9:46	BYU	Zach Wilson 4 Yd Run (Skyler Southam Kick)	BSU 13–14
3	1:44	BSU	Alexander Mattison 3 Yd Run (Haden Hoggarth Kick)	BSU 13–21
4	6:32	BYU	Skyler Southam 41 Yd Field Goal	BSU 16–21

Uniform Combination
Helmet	Jersey	Pants

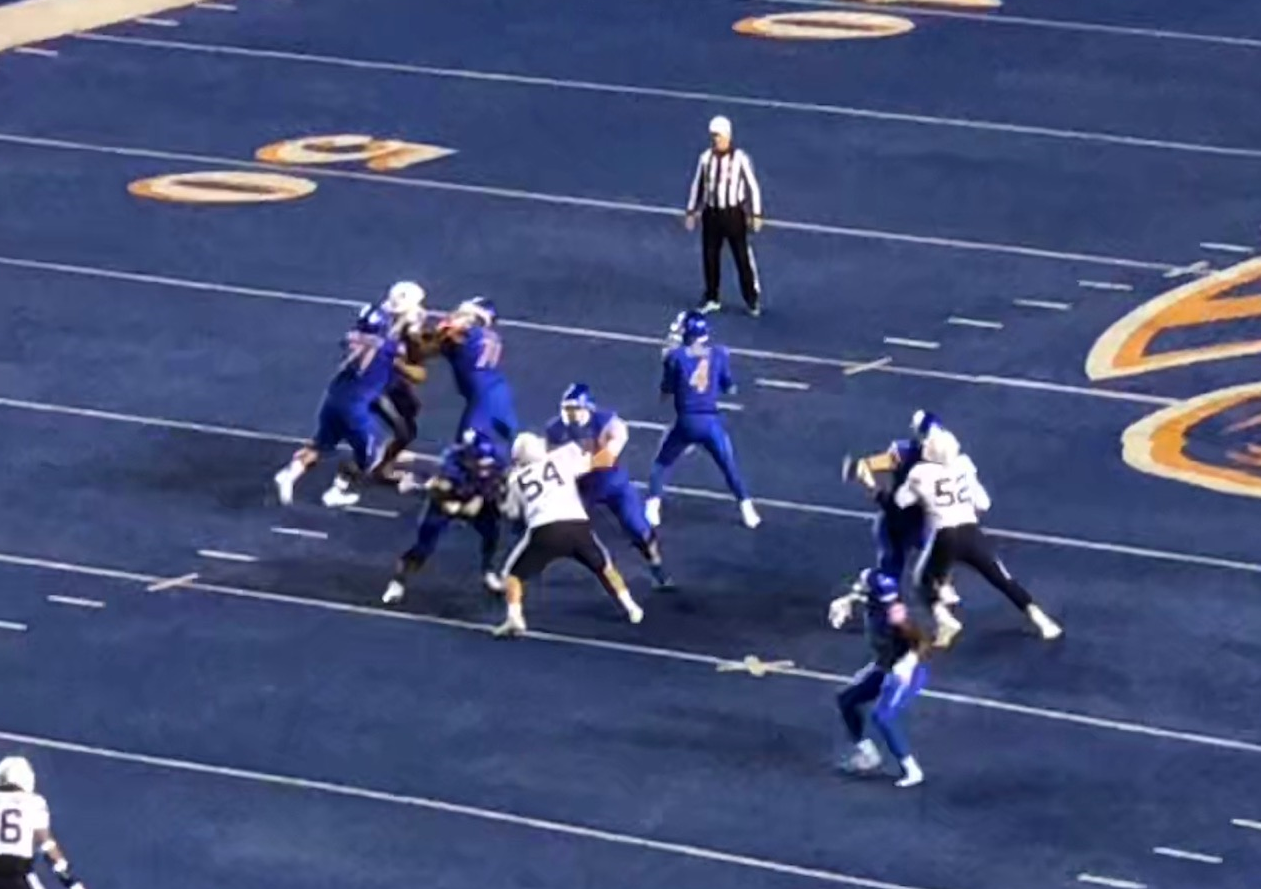
Brett Rypien throwing a pass during the 2nd quarter.

- Passing leaders: Brett Rypien (BSU): 23–35, 214 YDS, 1 TD, 1 INT; Zach Wilson (BYU): 18–27, 252 YDS.
- Rushing leaders: Alexander Mattison (BSU): 25 CAR, 89 YDS, 2 TD; Matt Hadley (BYU): 11 CAR, 39 YDS.
- Receiving leaders: A.J. Richardson (BSU): 4 REC, 53 YDS, 1 TD; Talon Shumway (BYU): 3 REC, 62 YDS.

Statistics	BYU	Boise State
Total yards	388	327
Passing yards	292	214
Rushing yards	96	113
First downs	21	20
Penalties	8-58	7-81
Turnovers	3	2
Time of possession	27:31	32:29

=== Fresno State ===
Fresno State at Boise State
(Battle for the Milk Can)

Team	1	2	3	4	Total
No. 16 Bulldogs	0	10	7	0	17
• Broncos	3	0	7	14	24

- Date: November 9, 2018
- Location: Albertsons Stadium
  Boise, ID
- Game start: 8:15 p.m. MST
- Elapsed time: 3:20
- Game attendance: 33,118
- Game weather: Temperature: 35 °F (2 °C) • Weather: Partly cloudy • Wind: 2 MPH E
- Referee: C. Castleberry
- TV announcers (ESPN2): Mike Couzens, Kirk Morrison

Scoring summary
1	6:37	BSU	Haden Hoggarth 35 Yd Field Goal	BSU 0–3
2	14:12	FRES	KeeSean Johnson 3 Yd pass from Marcus McMaryion (Asa Fuller Kick)	FRES 7–3
2	0:00	FRES	Asa Fuller 47 Yd Field Goal	FRES 10–3
3	11:42	FRES	Ronnie Rivers 1 Yd Run (Asa Fuller Kick)	FRES 17–3
3	5:56	BSU	Alexander Mattison 7 Yd Run (Haden Hoggarth Kick)	FRES 17–10
4	14:57	BSU	Alexander Mattison 1 Yd Run (Haden Hoggarth Kick)	Tied 17–17
4	9:22	BSU	Khalil Shakir 49 Yd pass from Brett Rypien (Haden Hoggarth Kick)	BSU 17–24

Uniform Combination
Helmet	Jersey	Pants

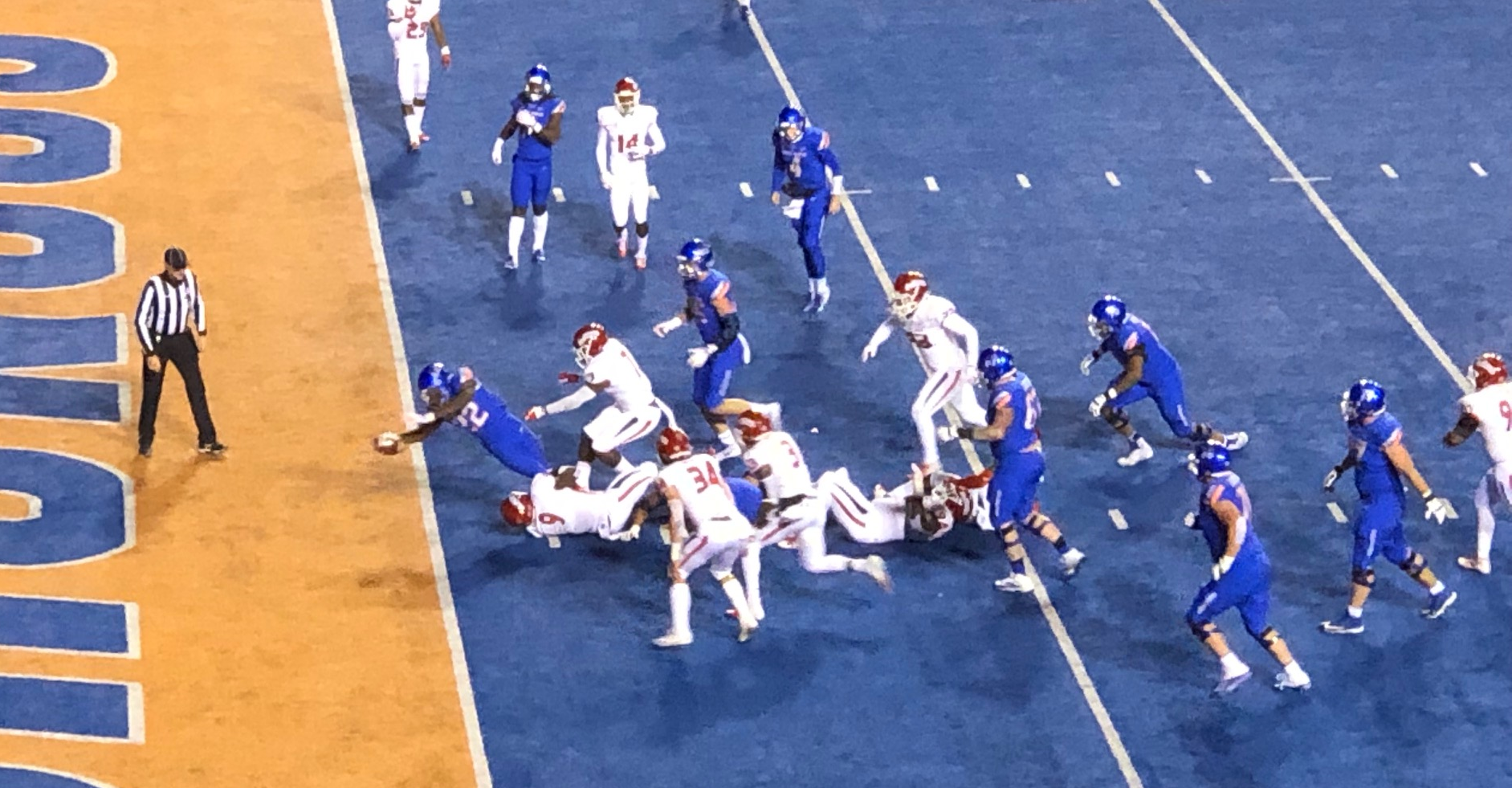
Alexander Mattison scoring a 3rd quarter TD.

- Passing leaders: Brett Rypien (BSU): 24–29, 269 YDS, 1 TD, 1 INT; Marcus McMaryion (FRES): 24–35, 283 YDS, 1 TD.
- Rushing leaders: Alexander Mattison (BSU): 30 CAR, 144 YDS, 2 TD; Jordan Mims (FRES): 8 CAR, 47 YDS.
- Receiving leaders: A.J. Richardson (BSU): 5 REC, 66 YDS; KeeSean Johnson (FRES): 8 REC, 95 YDS, 1 TD.

Quarterback Brett Rypien broke the Mountain West record for passing yards in a career, which now stands at 12,924 yards. The previous record was 12,690 set by Ryan Lindley of San Diego State in 2011. He also broke the Mountain West career completions record, also previously held by Lindley, and now has 981 career completions.

Statistics	Fresno State	Boise State
Total yards	390	448
Passing yards	283	269
Rushing yards	107	179
First downs	22	24
Penalties	9-61	4-45
Turnovers	0	1
Time of possession	25:34	34:26

=== At New Mexico ===
Boise State at New Mexico

Team	1	2	3	4	Total
• No. 23 Broncos	14	10	7	14	45
Lobos	0	7	0	7	14

- Date: November 16, 2018
- Location: Dreamstyle Stadium
  Albuquerque, NM
- Game start: 7:00 p.m. MST
- Elapsed time: 3:18
- Game attendance: 16,883
- Game weather: Temperature: 48 °F (9 °C) • Weather: Clear • Wind: 2 MPH SW
- Referee: Kevin Hassell
- TV announcers (CBSSN): Carter Blackburn, Aaron Taylor, John Schriffen

Scoring summary
1	12:38	BSU	Sean Modster 15 Yd pass from Brett Rypien (Haden Hoggarth Kick)	BSU 7–0
1	2:21	BSU	Sean Modster 16 Yd pass from Brett Rypien (Haden Hoggarth Kick)	BSU 14–0
2	13:07	UNM	Daevon Vigilant 1 Yd Run (Andrew Shelley Kick)	BSU 14–7
2	9:38	BSU	Desmond Williams 9 Yd Fumble Return (Haden Hoggarth Kick)	BSU 21–7
2	0:39	BSU	Haden Hoggarth 34 Yd Field Goal	BSU 24–7
3	11:07	BSU	Sean Modster 5 Yd pass from Brett Rypien (Haden Hoggarth Kick)	BSU 31–7
4	10:50	UNM	Marcus Hayes 86 Yd Punt Return (Andrew Shelley Kick)	BSU 31–14
4	8:18	BSU	Alexander Mattison 41 Yd Run (Haden Hoggarth Kick)	BSU 38–14
4	1:14	BSU	Andrew Van Buren 8 Yd Run (Haden Hoggarth Kick)	BSU 45–14

Uniform Combination
Helmet	Jersey	Pants

- Passing leaders: Brett Rypien (BSU): 17–27, 222 YDS, 3 TD; Sheriron Jones (UNM): 7–11, 88 YDS, 1 INT.
- Rushing leaders: Alexander Mattison (BSU): 20 CAR, 145 YDS, 1 TD; Sheriron Jones (UNM): 12 CAR, 56 YDS.
- Receiving leaders: Sean Modster (BSU): 9 REC, 129 YDS, 3 TD; Delane Hart-Johnson (UNM): 4 REC, 77 YDS.

Statistics	Boise State	New Mexico
Total yards	449	262
Passing yards	222	103
Rushing yards	227	159
First downs	30	15
Penalties	5-30	4-41
Turnovers	0	3
Time of possession	30:56	29:04

=== Utah State ===
Utah State at Boise State

Team	1	2	3	4	Total
No. 14 Aggies	7	7	0	10	24
• No. 21 Broncos	7	10	3	13	33

- Date: November 24, 2018
- Location: Albertsons Stadium
  Boise, ID
- Game start: 8:15 p.m. MST
- Elapsed time: 3:25
- Game attendance: 35,960
- Game weather: Temperature: 36 °F (2 °C) • Weather: Partly Cloudy • Wind: 4 MPH E
- Referee: Scott Campbell
- TV announcers (ESPN): Roy Philpott, Tom Ramsey, Ed Aschoff

Scoring summary
1	11:14	USU	Jalen Greene 9 Yd pass from Jordan Love (Dominik Eberle Kick)	USU 7–0
1	2:35	BSU	Alexander Mattison 2 Yd Run (Haden Hoggarth Kick)	Tied 7–7
2	14:45	BSU	Haden Hoggarth 23 Yd Field Goal	BSU 7–10
2	10:09	BSU	Alexander Mattison 1 Yd Run (Haden Hoggarth Kick)	BSU 7–17
2	7:34	USU	Ron'quavion Tarver 12 Yd pass from Jordan Love (Dominik Eberle Kick)	BSU 14–17
3	7:09	BSU	Haden Hoggarth 27 Yd Field Goal	BSU 14–20
4	14:53	USU	Dominik Eberle 45 Yd Field Goal	BSU 17–20
4	7:23	BSU	Garrett Collingham 1 Yd pass from Brett Rypien (Two-Point Pass Conversion Failed)	BSU 17–26
4	3:12	USU	Gerold Bright 83 Yd pass from Jordan Love (Dominik Eberle Kick)	BSU 24–26
4	0:04	BSU	Alexander Mattison 1 Yd Run (Haden Hoggarth Kick)	BSU 24–33

Uniform Combination
Helmet	Jersey	Pants

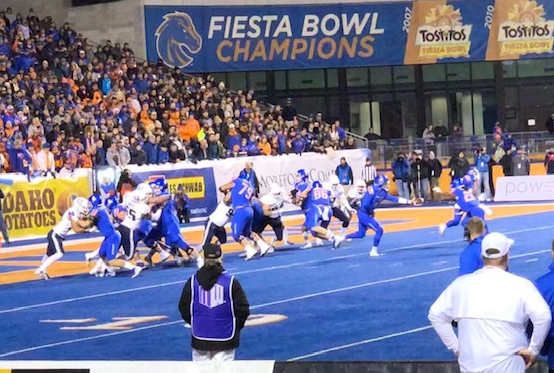
Alexander Mattison receiving a hand off that led to a 1st quarter TD.

- Passing leaders: Brett Rypien (BSU): 23–32, 310 YDS, 1 TD; Jordan Love (USU): 29–47, 363 YDS, 3 TD, 1 INT.
- Rushing leaders: Alexander Mattison (BSU): 37 CAR, 200 YDS, 3 TD; Darwin Thompson (USU): 11 CAR, 61 YDS.
- Receiving leaders: CT Thomas (BSU): 6 REC, 89 YDS; Aaren Vaughns (USU): 7 REC, 107 YDS.

Running back Alexander Mattison was named Mountain West Offensive Player of the Week following rushing for 200 yards and 3 touchdowns on a career high 37 carries. He also added 3 catches for 12 yards.

Statistics	Utah State	Boise State
Total yards	425	509
Passing yards	363	310
Rushing yards	62	199
First downs	18	20
Penalties	8-72	7-69
Turnovers	2	0
Time of possession	17:55	42:05

=== Fresno State (Mountain West Championship game) ===
Fresno State at Boise State
(Mountain West Championship Game)

Team	1	2	3	4	OT	Total
• No. 25 Bulldogs	7	3	3	0	6	19
No. 19 Broncos	7	0	0	6	3	16

- Date: December 1, 2018
- Location: Albertsons Stadium
  Boise, ID
- Game start: 5:45 p.m. MST
- Elapsed time: 3:35
- Game attendance: 23,662
- Game weather: 36 °F (2 °C) • Weather: Snow • Wind: 9 MPH ESE
- Referee: Kevin Hassell
- TV announcers (ESPN): Steve Levy, Brian Griese, Todd McShay

Scoring summary
1	9:03	FRES	Michiah Quick 15 Yd pass from Marcus McMaryion (Asa Fuller Kick)	FRES 7–0
1	1:56	BSU	Sean Modster 10 Yd pass from Brett Rypien (Haden Hoggarth Kick)	Tied 7–7
2	3:20	FRES	Asa Fuller 44 Yd Field Goal	FRES 10–7
3	11:07	FRES	Asa Fuller 38 Yd Field Goal	FRES 13–7
4	8:01	BSU	Alexander Mattison 34 Yd Run (Haden Hoggarth PAT blocked)	Tied 13–13
OT		BSU	Haden Hoggarth 23 Yd Field Goal	BSU 13–16
OT		FRES	Ronnie Rivers 1 Yd Run	FRES 19–16

Uniform Combination
Helmet	Jersey	Pants

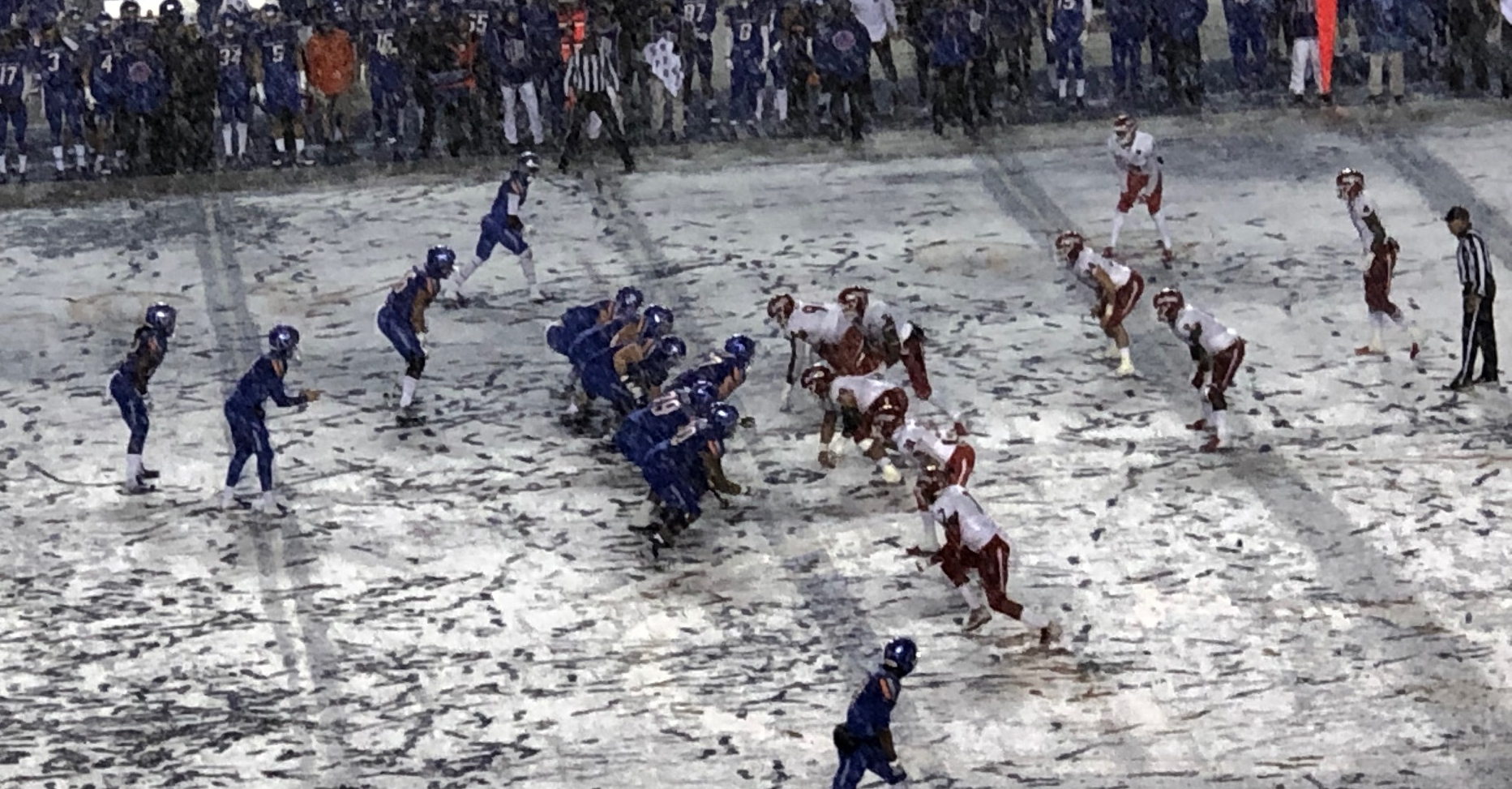
Boise State on offense in the 2nd quarter.

- Passing leaders: Brett Rypien (BSU): 15–31, 125 YDS, 1 TD; Marcus McMaryion (FRES): 21–33, 170 YDS, 1 TD.
- Rushing leaders: Alexander Mattison (BSU): 40 CAR, 200 YDS, 1 TD; Ronnie Rivers (FRES): 17 CAR, 63 YDS, 1 TD.
- Receiving leaders: Sean Modster (BSU): 4 REC, 45 YDS, 1 TD; Michiah Quick (FRES): 4 REC, 45 YDS, 1 TD.

Statistics	Fresno State	Boise State
Total yards	288	350
Passing yards	170	125
Rushing yards	118	225
First downs	14	22
Penalties	6-50	6-50
Turnovers	2	1
Time of possession	23:58	36:02

=== Vs. Boston College (First Responder Bowl) ===
Boston College vs. Boise State
(First Responder Bowl)

Team	1	2	3	4	Total
Eagles	-	-	-	-	0
No. 23 Broncos	-	-	-	-	0

- Date: December 26, 2018
- Location: Cotton Bowl
  Dallas, TX
- Game start: 11:30 a.m. MST
- TV announcers (ESPN): Lowell Galindo, Ahmad D. Brooks, Kris Budden

Uniform Combination
Helmet	Jersey	Pants

With Boston College leading 7–0 with 5:08 remaining in the 1st quarter, the game was delayed due to inclement weather. After an hour and a half delay, the game was canceled and ruled a no contest.

== Rankings ==
Ranking movements Legend: ██ Increase in ranking ██ Decrease in ranking — = Not ranked RV = Received votes
	Week															
Poll	Pre	1	2	3	4	5	6	7	8	9	10	11	12	13	14	Final
AP	22	20	17	RV	RV	RV	—	—	—	—	RV	23	21	19	23	23
Coaches	22	19	17	24	25	24	RV	—	—	RV	RV	24	22	20	24	24
CFP	Not released									—	—	25	23	22	25	Not released

== Post-season awards ==
=== Mountain West Offensive Player of the Year ===
Brett Rypien – Sr. QB

=== Mountain West first team ===
Offense

Brett Rypien – Sr. QB

Alexander Mattison – Jr. RB

Ezra Cleveland – So. OL

John Molchon – Jr. OL

Defense

Curtis Weaver – So. DL

Jabril Frazier – Sr. DL

Tyler Horton – Sr. DB

=== Mountain West second team ===
Offense

Sean Modster – Sr. WR

=== Mountain West honorable mention ===
Durrant Miles – Sr. DL

Kekoa Nawahine – Jr. DB

Avery Williams – So. DB/RS

Award Reference:

== Players drafted into the NFL ==
Round	Pick	Player	Position	NFL club
3	102	Alexander Mattison	RB	Minnesota Vikings
