= 2018 Air Force Falcons football team =

American college football season

2018 Air Force Falcons football
- Conference: Mountain West Conference
- Mountain Division
- Record: 5–7 (3–5 MW)
- Head coach: Troy Calhoun (12th season)
- Offensive coordinator: Mike Thiessen (10th season)
- Offensive scheme: Triple option
- Defensive coordinator: John Rudzinski (1st season)
- Base defense: Multiple
- Captains: Griffin Landrum; Marcus Bennett; Micah Capra
- Home stadium: Falcon Stadium

Uniform
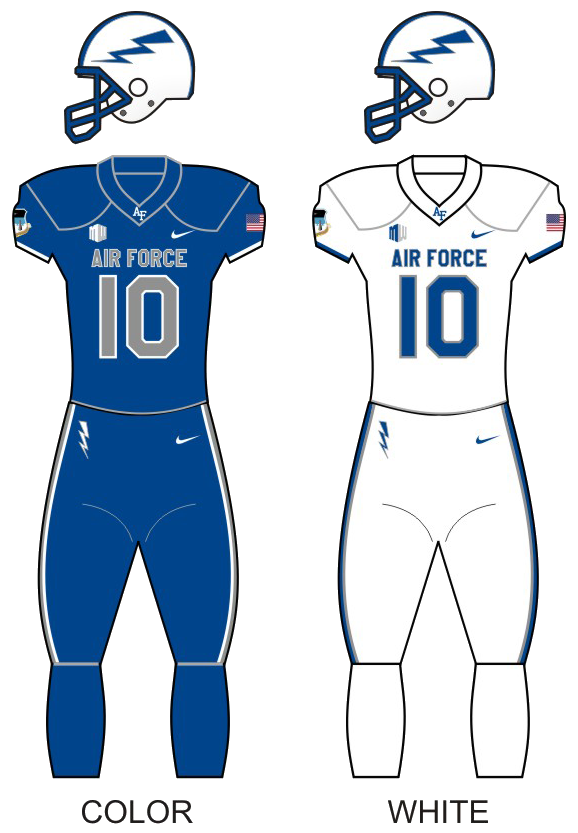

2018 Mountain West Conference football standings
	Conf.			Overall
Team	W		L	W		L
Mountain Division
No. 23 Boise State x	7	–	1	10	–	3
No. 22 Utah State	7	–	1	11	–	2
Wyoming	4	–	4	6	–	6
Air Force	3	–	5	5	–	7
Colorado State	2	–	6	3	–	9
New Mexico	1	–	7	3	–	9
West Division
No. 18 Fresno State x$	7	–	1	12	–	2
Nevada	5	–	3	8	–	5
Hawaii	5	–	3	8	–	6
San Diego State	4	–	4	7	–	6
UNLV	2	–	6	4	–	8
San Jose State	1	–	7	1	–	11
Championship: Fresno State 19, Boise State 16 (OT)
$ – Conference champion; x – Division champion/co-champions; y – Championship game participant; Rankings from AP Poll

The 2018 Air Force Falcons football team represented the United States Air Force Academy as a member of the Mountain Division in the Mountain West Conference (MW) during the 2018 NCAA Division I FBS football season. Led by 12th-year head coach Troy Calhoun, the Falcons compiled an overall record of 5–7 with a mark of 3–5 in conference play, placing fourth in the MW's Mountain Division. The team played home games at Falcon Stadium in Colorado Springs, Colorado

== Schedule ==
Date	Time	Opponent	Site	TV	Result	Attendance
September 1	12:00 p.m.	No. 20 Stony Brook*	Falcon Stadium; Colorado Springs, CO	Stadium	W 38–0	33,415
September 8	12:00 p.m.	at Florida Atlantic*	FAU Stadium; Boca Raton, FL	CBSSN	L 27–33	24,101
September 22	8:15 p.m.	at Utah State	Maverik Stadium; Logan, UT	ESPN2	L 32–42	22,720
September 29	1:00 p.m.	Nevada	Falcon Stadium; Colorado Springs, CO	ESPNews	L 25–28	23,707
October 6	1:30 p.m.	Navy*	Falcon Stadium; Colorado Springs, CO (Commander-in-Chief's Trophy)	CBSSN	W 35–7	40,175
October 12	7:00 p.m.	at San Diego State	SDCCU Stadium; San Diego, CA	CBSSN	L 17–21	25,326
October 19	8:00 p.m.	at UNLV	Sam Boyd Stadium; Whitney, NV	CBSSN	W 41–35	17,881
October 27	5:00 p.m.	Boise State	Falcon Stadium; Colorado Springs, CO	CBSSN	L 38–48	27,753
November 3	10:00 a.m.	at Army*	Michie Stadium; West Point, NY (Commander-in-Chief's Trophy)	CBSSN	L 14–17	38,502
November 10	1:30 p.m.	New Mexico	Falcon Stadium; Colorado Springs, CO	CBSSN	W 42–24	23,723
November 17	2:00 p.m.	at Wyoming	War Memorial Stadium; Laramie, WY	ESPNews	L 27–35	14,966
November 22	1:30 p.m.	Colorado State	Falcon Stadium; Colorado Springs, CO (rivalry)	CBSSN	W 27–19	17,432
*Non-conference game; Rankings from STATS Poll released prior to the game; All times are in Mountain time

== Preseason ==
=== Mountain West media days ===
During the Mountain West media days held July 24–25 at the Cosmopolitan on the Las Vegas Strip, the Falcons were predicted to finish in fifth place in the Mountain Division. They did not have any players selected to the preseason all-Mountain West team.

== Game summaries ==
=== Stony Brook ===
Stony Brook Seawolves at Air Force Falcons

Quarter	1	2	3	4	Total
No. 20 (FCS) Seawolves	0	0	0	0	0
Falcons	14	10	0	14	38

at Falcon Stadium, Colorado Springs, Colorado

- Date: September 1, 2018
- Game time: 12:00 p.m.
- Game weather: Partly cloudy, 75 °F (24 °C)
- Game attendance: 33,415
- Referee: Mike Vanderveld
- TV announcers (Stadium): Ari Wolfe, Max Starks, Dani Klupenger
- Boxscore

Game information

First Quarter

- (10:21) AFA – Worthman 7 yard TD rush, Philichi kick, AFA 0–7
- (9:41) AFA – Johnson 32 yard interception return for TD, Philichi kick, AFA 0–14

Second Quarter

- (12:36) AFA – Philichi 48 yard FG, AFA 0–17
- (6:37) AFA – Fagan 16 yard TD rush, Philichi kick, AFA 0–24

Third Quarter
No scoring
Fourth Quarter

- (13:45) AFA – Sanders 1 yard TD rush, Philichi kick, AFA 0–31
- (2:40) AFA – Hammond III 5 yard rush, Koehnke kick, AFA 0–38

Passing

- SB – Joe Carbone: 5/16, 30 yards, 1 INT
- AFA – Arion Worthman: 2/8, 29 yards

Rushing

- SB – Donald Liotine: 12 carries, 31 yards
- AFA – Joseph Saucier: 10 carries, 71 yards

Receiving

- SB – Donavin Washington: 2 receptions, 17 yards
- AFA – Marcus Bennett: 1 reception, 25 yards

=== At Florida Atlantic ===
Air Force Falcons at Florida Atlantic Owls

Quarter	1	2	3	4	Total
Falcons	0	7	13	7	27
Owls	6	13	6	8	33

at FAU Stadium, Boca Raton, Florida

- Date: September 8, 2018
- Game time: 12:00 p.m.
- Game weather: Partly cloudy, 85 °F (29 °C)
- Game attendance: 24,101
- Referee: Kevin Boitmann
- TV announcers (CBSSN): Rich Waltz, Aaron Murray, Amanda Balionis
- Boxscore

Game information

First Quarter

- (10:16) FAU – Rivas 24 yard FG, FAU 0–3
- (3:22) FAU – Rivas 34 yard FG, FAU 0–6

Second Quarter

- (7:12) FAU – Singletary 36 yard TD rush, Rivas kick, FAU 0–13
- (2:50) AFA – Eriksen 1 yard TD rush, Philichi kick, FAU 7–13
- (0:27) FAU – Wright 17 yard TD pass from Robison, Two-Point pass failed, FAU 7–19

Third Quarter

- (11:46) AFA – Waguespack 12 yard TD pass from Sanders, Philichi kick, FAU 14–19
- (9:40) FAU – Durante 48 yard TD pass from Robison, Rivas kick failed, FAU 14–25
- (6:00) AFA – Birdow 7 yard TD rush, Two-Point pass failed, FAU 20–25

Fourth Quarter

- (10:41) FAU – Wright 26 yard TD pass from Robison, Two-Point pass, FAU 20–33
- (0:50) AFA – Wills 5 yard blocked punt return, Philichi kick, FAU 27–33

Passing

- AFA – Isaiah Sanders: 8/13, 164 yards, 1 TD, 1 INT
- FAU – Chris Robison: 33/44, 471, 3 TDs

Rushing

- AFA – Cole Fagan: 16 carries, 80 yards
- FAU – Devin Singletary: 16 carries, 57 yards, 1 TD

Receiving

- AFA – Marcus Bennett: 2 receptions, 87 yards
- FAU – Jovon Durante: 12 receptions, 174, 1 TD

=== At Utah State ===
Air Force Falcons at Utah State Aggies

Quarter	1	2	3	4	Total
Falcons	0	14	3	15	32
Aggies	7	14	14	7	42

at Maverik Stadium, Logan, Utah

- Date: September 22, 2018
- Game time: 8:15 p.m.
- Game weather: Clear skies, 72 °F (22 °C)
- Game attendance: 22,720
- Referee: Kevin Hassell
- TV announcers (ESPN2): Roy Philpott, Tom Ramsey
- Boxscore

Game information

First Quarter

- (9:08) USU – Thompson 6 yard TD rush, Eberle kick, USU 0–7

Second Quarter

- (13:48) AFA – Sanders 1 yard TD rush, Philichi kick, Tied 7–7
- (7:13) AFA – Fagan 8 yard TD rush, Philichi kick, AFA 14–7
- (6:18) USU – Bright 4 yard TD rush, Eberle kick, Tied 14–14
- (1:02) USU – Vaughns 43 yard TD pass from Love, Eberle kick, USU 14–21

Third Quarter

- (9:04) USU – Thompson 1 yard TD rush, Eberle kick, USU 14–28
- (8:15) USU – Raymond 30 yard TD pass from Love, Eberle kick, USU 14–35
- (2:48) AFA – Koehnke 31 yard FG, USU 17–35

Fourth Quarter

- (13:13) AFA – Remsberg 9 yard TD rush, two-point pass, USU 25–35
- (13:00) AFA – Musselman 21 yard fumble return TD, Koehnke kick, USU 32–35
- (6:52) USU – Bright 70 yard TD rush, Eberle kick, USU 32–42

Passing

- AFA – Isaiah Sanders: 9/17, 125 yards
- USU – Jordan Love: 26/38, 356 yards, 2 TDs

Rushing

- AFA – Kadin Remsberg: 17 carries, 94 yards, 1 TD
- USU – Gerold Bright: 11 carries, 101 yards, 2 TDs

Receiving

- AFA – Marcus Bennett: 5 receptions, 74 yards
- USU – Ron'Quavion Tarver: 9 receptions, 128 yards

=== Nevada ===
Nevada Wolf Pack at Air Force Falcons

Quarter	1	2	3	4	Total
Wolf Pack	7	14	7	0	28
Falcons	0	7	10	8	25

at Falcon Stadium, Colorado Springs, Colorado

- Date: September 29, 2018
- Game time: 1:00 p.m.
- Game attendance: 23,707
- TV announcers (ESPNews): Doug Sherman, Dustin Fox

Game information

First Quarter
Second Quarter
Third Quarter
Fourth Quarter

Passing

- NEV –
- AFA –

Rushing

- NEV –
- AFA –

Receiving

- NEV –
- AFA –

=== Navy ===
47th Battle for the Commander-in-Chief's Trophy: Navy Midshipmen at Air Force Falcons

Quarter	1	2	3	4	Total
Midshipmen	0	7	0	0	7
Falcons	0	14	14	7	35

at Falcon Stadium, Colorado Springs, Colorado

- Date: October 6, 2018
- Game time: 1:30 p.m.
- Game attendance: 40,175
- TV announcers (CBSSN): Carter Blackburn, Aaron Taylor

Game information

First Quarter
Second Quarter
Third Quarter
Fourth Quarter

Passing

- NAVY –
- AFA –

Rushing

- NAVY –
- AFA –

Receiving

- NAVY –
- AFA –

=== At San Diego State ===
Air Force Falcons at San Diego State Aztecs

Quarter	1	2	3	4	Total
Falcons	2	7	0	8	17
Aztecs	7	7	0	7	21

at SDCCU Stadium, San Diego, California

- Date: October 12, 2018
- Game time: 7:00 p.m.
- Game weather: Clear, 67 °F (19 °C)
- Game attendance: 25,326
- Referee: Stephen Baron
- TV announcers (CBSSN): Carter Blackburn, Aaron Taylor
- Agnew's late TD pass lifts SDSU over Air Force, 21-17,

Game information

First Quarter

- SDSU – Chase Jasmin 4-yard run (John Baron II kick), 13:49. Aztecs 7–0. Drive: 3 plays, 65 yards, 1:11.
- AFA – Team safety, 0:07. Aztecs 7–2. Drive: 2 plays, -7 yards, 0:31.

Second Quarter

- AFA – Ronald Cleveland 12-yard run (Jake Koehnke Kick), 5:13. Falcons 9–7. Drive: 9 plays, 80 yards, 5:17.
- SDSU – Trenton Thompson 19-yard return of blocked punt (John Baron II kick), 0:08. Aztecs 14–9. Drive: 3 plays, 9 yards, 2:21.

Third Quarter

No scoring plays

Fourth Quarter

- AFA – Ronald Cleveland 4-yard run (Two-point conversion), 9:25. Falcons 17–14. Drive: 7 plays, 40 yards, 3:14.
- SDSU – Parker Houston 29-yard pass from Ryan Agnew (John Baron II kick), 6:10. Aztecs 21–17. Drive: 8 plays, 94 yards, 3:08.

Passing

- AFA – Isaiah Sanders – 7/15, 51 yards, 1 INT
- SDSU – Ryan Agnew – 9/25, 213 yards, 1 TD, 1 INT

Rushing

- AFA – Cole Fagan – 16 rushes, 90 yards
- SDSU – Chase Jasmin – 18 rushes, 70 yards, 1 TD

Receiving

- AFA – Kade Waguespack – 2 receptions, 31 yards
- SDSU – Fred Trevillion – 3 receptions, 94 yards

=== At UNLV ===
Air Force Falcons at UNLV Rebels

Quarter	1	2	3	4	Total
Falcons	3	17	21	0	41
Rebels	7	14	7	7	35

at Sam Boyd Stadium, Whitney, Nevada

- Date: October 19, 2018
- Game time: 8:00 p.m.
- Game attendance: 17,881
- TV: CBSSN

Game information

First Quarter
Second Quarter
Third Quarter
Fourth Quarter

Passing

- AFA –
- UNLV –

Rushing

- AFA –
- UNLV –

Receiving

- AFA –
- UNLV –

=== Boise State ===
Boise State Broncos at Air Force Falcons

Quarter	1	2	3	4	Total
Broncos	14	14	10	10	48
Falcons	7	21	3	7	38

at Falcon Stadium, Colorado Springs, Colorado

- Date: October 27, 2018
- Game time: 5:00 p.m.
- Game attendance: 27,753
- TV: CBSSN

Game information

First Quarter
Second Quarter
Third Quarter
Fourth Quarter

Passing

- BSU –
- AFA –

Rushing

- BSU –
- AFA –

Receiving

- BSU –
- AFA –

=== At Army ===
47th Battle for the Commander-in-Chief's Trophy: Air Force Falcons at Army Black Knights

Quarter	1	2	3	4	Total
Falcons	0	0	6	8	14
Black Knights	7	7	0	3	17

at Michie Stadium, West Point, New York

- Date: November 3, 2018
- Game time: 10:00 a.m.
- Game weather: Temperature: 53 F • Wind: W 19 mph • Weather: Cloudy, chilly
- Game attendance: 38,502
- Referee: Mike Defee
- TV announcers (CBSSN): Ben Holden (Play-by-play), Jay Feely (color) & Tina Cervasio (sideline)
- ESPN – Army holds off Air Force 17-14, 11th straight win at home

Game information

First Quarter

- (02:05) ARMY TD: Darnell Woolfolk 1-yard rush (John Abercrombie kick); 21 plays, 75 yards, 12:55

Second Quarter

- (04:03) ARMY TD: Kelvin Hopkins Jr. 6-yard rush (John Abercrombie kick); 11 plays, 89 yards, 6:47

Third Quarter

- (00:54) AFA TD: Donald Hammond III 1-yard rush (Jake Koehnke kick failed); 9 plays, 34 yards, 3:50

Fourth Quarter

- (08:35) ARMY FG: John Abercrombie 30-yard field goal; 13 plays, 62 yards, 7:19
- (05:27) AFA TD: Joseph Saucier 6-yard rush (Joseph Saucier rush); 10 plays, 75 yards, 3:08

Passing

- AFA – Donald Hammond III: 7/15, 120 yds
- ARMY – Kelvin Hopkins Jr.: 3/5, 44 yds

Rushing

- AFA – Cole Fagan: 10 att, 37 yds
- ARMY – Darnell Woolfolk: 21 att, 117 yds, 1 TD

Receiving

- AFA – Geraud Sanders: 3 rec, 55 yds
- ARMY – Jordan Asberry: 2 rec, 35 yds

=== New Mexico ===
New Mexico Lobos at Air Force Falcons

Quarter	1	2	3	4	Total
Lobos	0	17	7	0	24
Falcons	7	14	14	7	42

at Falcon Stadium, Colorado Springs, Colorado

- Date: November 10, 2018
- Game time: 1:30 p.m.
- Game attendance: 23,723
- TV: CBSSN

Game information

First Quarter
Second Quarter
Third Quarter
Fourth Quarter

Passing

- UNM –
- AFA –

Rushing

- UNM –
- AFA –

Receiving

- UNM –
- AFA –

=== At Wyoming ===
Air Force Falcons at Wyoming Cowboys

Quarter	1	2	3	4	Total
Falcons	7	10	7	3	27
Cowboys	14	0	0	21	35

at War Memorial Stadium, Laramie, Wyoming

- Date: November 17, 2018
- Game time: 2:00 p.m.
- Game attendance: 14,966
- TV: ESPNews

Game information

First Quarter
Second Quarter
Third Quarter
Fourth Quarter

Passing

- AFA –
- WYO –

Rushing

- AFA –
- WYO –

Receiving

- AFA –
- WYO –

=== Colorado State ===
56th Battle for the Ram–Falcon Trophy: Colorado State Rams at Air Force Falcons

Quarter	1	2	3	4	Total
Rams	0	13	0	6	19
Falcons	7	10	0	10	27

at Falcon Stadium, Colorado Springs, Colorado

- Date: November 24, 2018
- Game time: 1:30 p.m.
- Game weather: Temperature: 54 F • Wind: WSW 5-10 mph • Weather: Partly Cloudy
- Game attendance: 17,432
- Referee: Eddy Shelton
- TV announcers (CBSSN): Rich Waltz (Play-by-play), Aaron Murray (color) & Amanda Balionis (sideline)
- ESPN – Fagan rushes for 260, Air Force beats Colorado State 27-19 /// Box Score, Colorado State at Air Force

Game information

First Quarter

- (05:48) AF TD: Cole Fagan 3-yard rush (Jake Koehnke kick); 13 plays, 80 yards, 5:54

Second Quarter

- (10:34) AF TD: Marcus Bennett 16-yard pass from Donald Hammond III (Jake Koehnke kick); 4 plays, 74 yards, 1:35
- (07:07) CSU TD: Preston Williams 34-yard pass from Collin Hill (Wyatt Bryan kick failed); 10 plays, 92 yards, 3:21
- (01:09) AF FG: Jake Koehnke 29-yard field goal; 12 plays, 63 yards, 5:58
- (00:26) CSU TD: Preston Williams 58-yard pass from Collin Hill (Wyatt Bryan kick); 5 plays, 75 yards, 0:43

Third Quarter

No Scoring

Fourth Quarter

- (13:49) AF FG: Jake Koehnke 39-yard field goal; 18 plays, 76 yards, 6:51
- (09:53) CSU TD: Preston Williams 31-yard pass from K.J. Carta-Samuels (Wyatt Bryan kick blocked); 9 plays, 75 yards, 3:56
- (03:35) AF TD: Kadin Remsberg 4-yard rush (Jake Koehnke kick); 11 plays, 75 yards, 6:18

Passing

- CSU – Collin Hill: 13/23, 284 yds, 2 TD, 1 INT
- AF – Donald Hammond III: 8/16, 81 yds, 1 TD

Rushing

- CSU – Izzy Matthews: 10 att, 52 yds
- AF – Cole Fagan: 34 att, 260 yds, 1 TD

Receiving

- CSU – Preston Williams: 12 rec, 248 yds, 3 TD
- AF – Marcus Bennett: 3 rec, 34 yds, 1 TD

== After the season ==
=== NFL draft ===
The following Falcon was selected in the 2019 NFL draft following the season.

Round	Pick	Player	Position	NFL team
7	250	Austin Cutting	LS	Minnesota Vikings
