= Alexander Mattison =

American football player (born 1998)

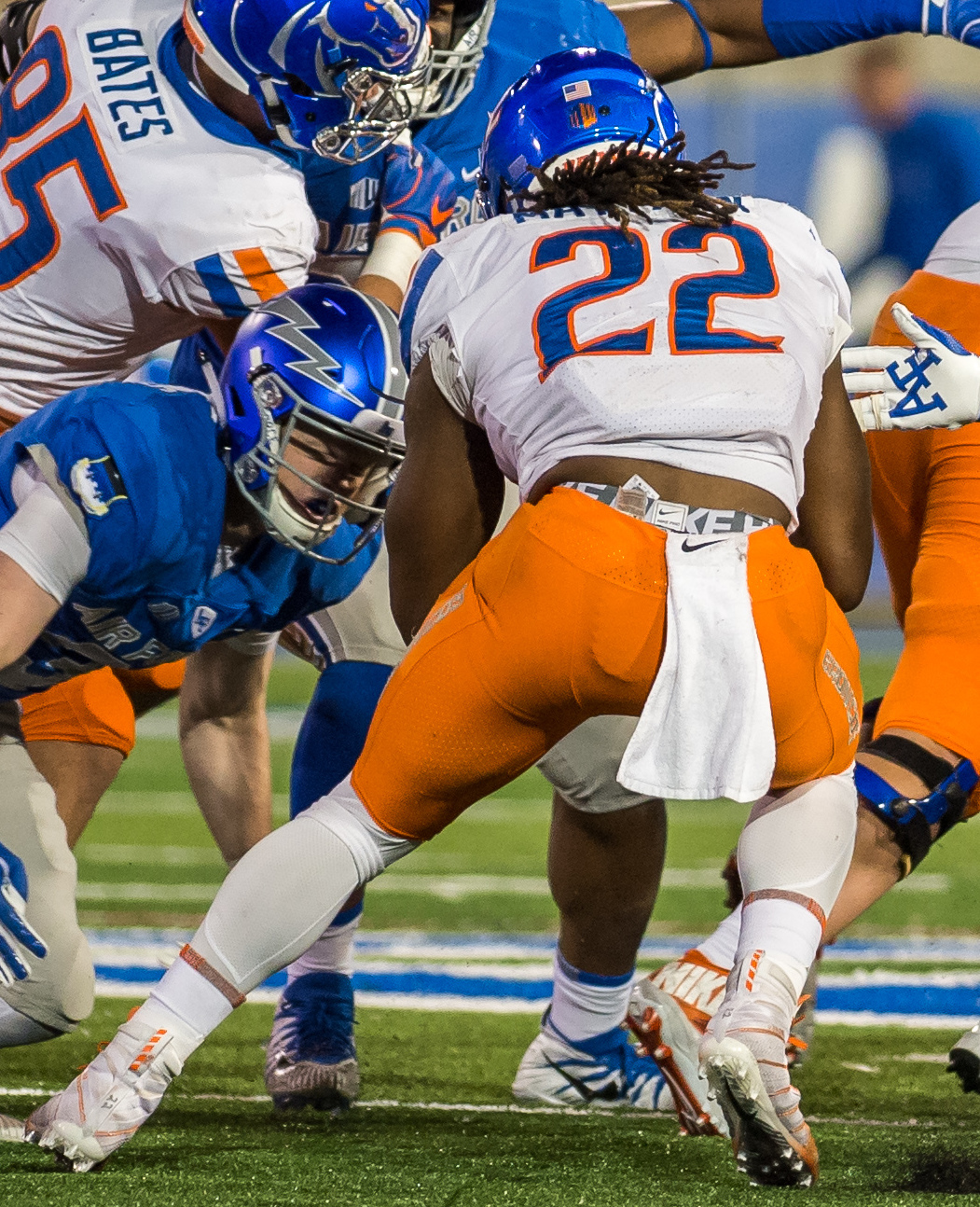
- Mattison rushing for the Boise State Broncos in 2018

Profile
- Position: Running back

Personal information
- Born: June 19, 1998 (age 28); San Bernardino, California, U.S.
- Listed height: 5 ft 11 in (1.80 m)
- Listed weight: 220 lb (100 kg)

Career information
- High school: San Bernardino
- College: Boise State (2016–2018)
- NFL draft: 2019: 3rd round, 102nd overall pick

Career history
- Minnesota Vikings (2019–2023); Las Vegas Raiders (2024); Miami Dolphins (2025)

Awards and highlights
- First-team All-MW (2018)

Career NFL statistics as of 2025
- Rushing yards: 2,790
- Rushing average: 3.9
- Rushing touchdowns: 15
- Receptions: 136
- Receiving yards: 1,012
- Receiving touchdowns: 7
- Stats at Pro Football Reference

Alexander Mattison (born June 19, 1998) is an American professional football running back. He played college football for the Boise State Broncos and was selected by the Minnesota Vikings in the third round of the 2019 NFL draft.

== Early life ==
Mattison attended San Bernardino High School in San Bernardino, California, where he played high school football. He rushed for over 2,000 yards in each of his final two seasons, going for 2,017 yards and 26 touchdowns as a junior and 2,057 yards and 22 touchdowns as a senior. Mattison was selected to play in the Inland Valley Football Classic following his senior season. In addition to football, Mattison also ran track and wrestled. As a senior, he won the Mountain Valley League title in the 110m hurdles. His personal-bests are 14.95 seconds (110m hurdles), 11.34s (100 meters), 23.34s (200 meters), 22 ft 9 in (6.93 m) in the long jump and 46 ft 5.5 in (14.161 m) in the shot put. He also won a league wrestling title at 195 pounds and was named all-league as a junior. He committed to Boise State University to play college football.

== College career ==
As a true freshman at Boise State in 2016, Mattison appeared in all 13 games and had 328 yards on 67 carries with four touchdowns. As a sophomore, he played in all 14 games, rushing for 1,086 yards on 212 carries and 12 touchdowns.

As a junior in 2018, he rushed for 1,415 yards on 302 carries with 17 touchdowns in 13 games. He was the Offensive MVP of the 2018 Mountain West Conference Football Championship Game after rushing for 200 yards and a touchdown.

After the season, Mattison entered the 2019 NFL draft. He cited his reason as "You can only play as long as your body lets you, and at this position, you can't assume it'll last forever." Mattison didn't miss a game in his college career, despite needing offseason surgeries on his shoulder and ankle.

=== College statistics ===
Year	Team	GP	Rushing				Receiving			
Year	Team	GP	Att	Yds	Avg	TD	Rec	Yds	Avg	TD
2016	Boise State	11	67	328	4.9	4	5	54	10.8	0
2017	Boise State	14	212	1,086	5.1	12	28	284	10.1	1
2018	Boise State	13	302	1,415	4.7	17	27	173	6.4	0
Career		38	581	2,829	4.9	33	60	511	8.5	1

== Professional career ==
Pre-draft measurables
Height	Weight	Arm length	Hand span	40-yard dash	10-yard split	20-yard split	20-yard shuttle	Three-cone drill	Vertical jump	Broad jump	Bench press
5 ft 10 5/8 in (1.79 m)	221 lb (100 kg)	31 in (0.79 m)	9 1/8 in (0.23 m)	4.60 s	1.57 s	2.67 s	4.29 s	7.13 s	35.0 in (0.89 m)	10 ft 7 in (3.23 m)	22 reps
All values from NFL Combine except 40-yard dash from Pro day

=== Minnesota Vikings ===
The Minnesota Vikings selected Mattison in the third round (102nd overall) of the 2019 NFL draft. He made his NFL debut in the 2019 regular season opener against the Atlanta Falcons; Mattison had nine carries for 49 yards in the 28–12 victory. In Week 3 against the Oakland Raiders, Mattison rushed 12 times for 58 yards and his first career rushing touchdown as the Vikings won 34–14. Overall, he finished his rookie season with 462 rushing yards and a rushing touchdown.

In a Week 5 Sunday Night Football game against the Seattle Seahawks, Mattison finished with 20 carries for 112 rushing yards as the Vikings narrowly lost 26–27. Fellow teammate and running back Dalvin Cook was injured in the game, allowing Mattison to record his first game with at least 100 rushing yards as a professional. In the 2020 season, Mattison had 96 carries for 434 rushing yards and two rushing touchdowns, to go along with 13 receptions for 125 receiving yards and one receiving touchdown, in 13 games with two starts.

In the 2021 season, Mattison appeared in 16 games with four starts. He had 134 carries for 491 rushing yards and three rushing touchdowns, to go along with 32 receptions for 228 receiving yards and one receiving touchdown.

In the 2022 season, Mattison appeared in all 17 games. He finished with 74 carries for 283 rushing yards and five rushing touchdowns, as well as 15 receptions for 91 receiving yards and one receiving touchdown.

On March 17, 2023, Mattison signed a two-year, $7 million contract extension with the Vikings. With the departure of Cook in the offseason, Mattison earned the opportunity to start for the Vikings. In 16 games with 13 starts, he recorded 180 carries for 700 rushing yards, as well as 30 receptions for 192 receiving yards and three receiving touchdowns. He committed three fumbles, recovering one.

On March 4, 2024, Mattison was released by the Vikings after five seasons.

=== Las Vegas Raiders ===
On March 18, 2024, Mattison signed with the Las Vegas Raiders.

In Week 9, Mattison had 123 all-purpose yards, 92 yards on 23 carries and 31 yards on three receptions, in the 20–15 loss against the Los Angeles Rams. In Week 11, Mattison suffered an ankle injury in the 34–19 loss against the Miami Dolphins. He missed Week 12's matchup against Denver Broncos and Week 13's matchup against Kansas City Chiefs. In the 2024 season, Mattison had 132 carries for 420 rushing yards and four rushing touchdowns to go with 36 receptions for 294 receiving yards and one receiving touchdown.

=== Miami Dolphins ===
On March 14, 2025, Mattison signed a one-year contract with the Miami Dolphins. On August 10, Mattison hurt his neck during a preseason game against the Chicago Bears and had to be taken to a hospital for season-ending surgery.

== NFL career statistics ==
=== Regular season ===
Year	Team	Games		Rushing					Receiving					Fumbles	
Year	Team	GP	GS	Att	Yds	Avg	Lng	TD	Rec	Yds	Avg	Lng	TD	Fum	Lost
2019	MIN	13	0	100	462	4.6	35	1	10	82	8.2	17	0	1	1
2020	MIN	13	2	96	434	4.5	25	2	13	125	9.6	28	1	0	0
2021	MIN	16	4	134	491	3.7	48	3	32	228	7.1	24	1	1	1
2022	MIN	17	0	74	283	3.8	15	5	15	91	6.1	16	1	0	0
2023	MIN	16	13	180	700	3.9	21	0	30	192	6.4	47	3	3	2
2024	LV	14	7	132	420	3.2	24	4	36	294	8.2	31	1	1	1
Career		89	26	716	2,790	3.9	48	15	136	1,012	7.4	47	7	6	5

=== Postseason ===
Year	Team	Games		Rushing					Receiving					Fumbles	
Year	Team	GP	GS	Att	Yds	Avg	Lng	TD	Rec	Yds	Avg	Lng	TD	Fum	Lost
2019	MIN	2	0	6	23	3.8	16	0	1	10	10.0	10	0	0	0
2022	MIN	1	0	0	0	0.0	0	0	1	2	2.0	2	0	0	0
Career		3	0	6	23	3.8	16	0	2	12	6.0	10	0	0	0

== Personal life ==
Mattison is a Christian. He is fluent in Spanish.
