= 2018 Hawaii Rainbow Warriors football team =

American college football season

2018 Hawaii Rainbow Warriors football

Hawaii Bowl, L 14–31 vs. Louisiana Tech
- Conference: Mountain West Conference
- West Division
- Record: 8–6 (5–3 MW)
- Head coach: Nick Rolovich (3rd season)
- Offensive coordinator: Brian Smith (3rd season)
- Offensive scheme: Run and shoot
- Defensive coordinator: Corey Batoon (1st season)
- Base defense: 4–2–5
- Home stadium: Aloha Stadium

2018 Mountain West Conference football standings
	Conf.			Overall
Team	W		L	W		L
Mountain Division
No. 23 Boise State x	7	–	1	10	–	3
No. 22 Utah State	7	–	1	11	–	2
Wyoming	4	–	4	6	–	6
Air Force	3	–	5	5	–	7
Colorado State	2	–	6	3	–	9
New Mexico	1	–	7	3	–	9
West Division
No. 18 Fresno State x$	7	–	1	12	–	2
Nevada	5	–	3	8	–	5
Hawaii	5	–	3	8	–	6
San Diego State	4	–	4	7	–	6
UNLV	2	–	6	4	–	8
San Jose State	1	–	7	1	–	11
Championship: Fresno State 19, Boise State 16 (OT)
$ – Conference champion; x – Division champion/co-champions; y – Championship game participant; Rankings from AP Poll

The 2018 Hawaii Rainbow Warriors football team represented the University of Hawaii at Manoa in the 2018 NCAA Division I FBS football season. The Rainbow Warriors played their home games at Aloha Stadium in Honolulu. They competed in the West Division of the Mountain West Conference and were led by third-year head coach Nick Rolovich. They finished the season 8–6, 5–3 in Mountain West play to finish in a tie for second place in the West Division. They were invited to the Hawaii Bowl where they lost to Louisiana Tech. The Rainbow Warriors clinched their first winning season since 2010 with a 31-30 overtime win at San Diego State, while also clinching a winning conference record in the process.

== Preseason ==
=== Award watch lists ===
Listed in the order that they were released

Award	Player	Position	Year
Fred Biletnikoff Award	John Ursua	WR	JR
Butkus Award	Jahlani Tavai	LB	SR
Bronko Nagurski Trophy	Jahlani Tavai	LB	SR
Wuerffel Trophy	Noah Borden	LS	SR

=== Mountain West media days ===
During the Mountain West media days held July 24–25 at the Cosmopolitan on the Las Vegas Strip, the Rainbow Warriors were predicted to finish in fifth place in the West Division.

==== Media poll ====
West Division
Predicted finish	Team	Votes (1st place)
1	Fresno State	126 (16)
2	San Diego State	116 (6)
3	UNLV	78
4	Nevada	72
5	Hawaii	45
6	San Jose State	25

==== Preseason All-Mountain West Team ====
The Rainbow Warriors had one player selected to the preseason all-Mountain West team.

Defense

Jahlani Tavai – LB

== Schedule ==
Date	Time	Opponent	Site	TV	Result	Attendance
August 25	2:30 p.m.	at Colorado State	Canvas Stadium; Fort Collins, CO	CBSSN	W 43–34	31,007
September 1	5:00 p.m.	Navy*	Aloha Stadium; Honolulu, HI	CBSSN	W 59–41	29,702
September 8	6:00 p.m.	Rice*	Aloha Stadium; Honolulu, HI	SPEC HI	W 43–29	23,112
September 15	6:00 a.m.	at Army*	Michie Stadium; West Point, NY	CBSSN	L 21–28	31,133
September 22	6:00 p.m.	Duquesne*^{†}	Aloha Stadium; Honolulu, HI	SPEC HI	W 42–21	26,175
September 29	1:00 p.m.	at San Jose State	CEFCU Stadium; San Jose, CA (rivalry)	SPEC HI	W 44–41 ^{5OT}	16,363
October 6	6:00 p.m.	Wyoming	Aloha Stadium; Honolulu, HI (rivalry)	SPEC HI	W 17–13	23,907
October 13	4:15 p.m.	at BYU*	LaVell Edwards Stadium; Provo, UT	ESPN2	L 23–49	52,354
October 20	6:00 p.m.	Nevada	Aloha Stadium; Honolulu, HI	SPEC HI	L 22–40	24,475
October 27	4:30 p.m.	at Fresno State	Bulldog Stadium; Fresno, CA (rivalry)	ESPN2	L 20–50	33,659
November 3	6:00 p.m.	No. 18 Utah State	Aloha Stadium; Honolulu, HI	SPEC HI	L 17–56	21,476
November 17	6:00 p.m.	UNLV	Aloha Stadium; Honolulu, HI	SPEC HI	W 35–28	25,697
November 24	4:30 p.m.	at San Diego State	SDCCU Stadium; San Diego, CA	ESPNU	W 31–30 ^{OT}	28,014
December 22	5:30 p.m.	Louisiana Tech*	Aloha Stadium; Honolulu, HI (Hawaii Bowl)	ESPN	L 14–31	30,911
*Non-conference game; ^{†}Homecoming; Rankings from AP Poll released prior to the game; All times are in Hawaii time

== Staff ==
Name	Position	Alma mater	Joined Staff
Nick Rolovich	Head Coach	Hawaii (2004)	2016
Brian Smith	Associate head coach / offensive coordinator / running backs	Hawaii (2005)	2016
Mark Banker	Assistant Head Coach / Inside Linebackers	Springfield (MA) (1978)	2018
Corey Batoon	Defensive coordinator / Safeties	Long Beach State (1991)	2018
Michael Ghobrial	Special Teams Coordinator	UCLA (2011)	2018
Craig Stutzmann	Passing Game Coordinator / quarterbacks	Hawaii (2002)	2016
Mark Weber	Offensive Line	Cal Lutheran (1980)	2018
Andre Allen	Wide Receivers	Ashford (2014)	2018
Ricky Logo	Defensive Line	North Carolina State (1992)	2018
Abe Elimimian	Cornerbacks	Hawaii (2004)	2015
Jacob Yoro	Outside Linebackers / Nickelbacks	Hawaii (2008)	2017

Coaching Source

== Game summaries ==
=== At Colorado State ===
	1	2	3	4	Total
Rainbow Warriors	10	13	14	6	43
Rams	7	0	13	14	34

Scoring summary

Quarter	Time	Drive			Team	Scoring information	Score	
Quarter	Time	Plays	Yards	TOP	Team	Scoring information	HAW	CSU
1	10:02	10	75	4:58	HAW	John Ursua 4-yard touchdown reception from Cole McDonald, Ryan Meskell kick good	7	0
1	5:26	14	85	4:26	CSU	Bisi Johnson 10-yard touchdown reception from K. J. Carta-Samuels, Wyatt Bryan kick good	7	7
1	1:18	9	72	4:08	HAW	21-yard field goal by Ryan Meskell	10	7
2	11:32	9	67	3:53	HAW	Cole McDonald 12-yard touchdown run, 2-point pass failed	16	7
2	0:28	6	46	1:43	HAW	Cole McDonald 6-yard touchdown run, Ryan Meskell kick good	23	7
3	8:48	7	75	3:34	HAW	John Ursua 19-yard touchdown reception from Cole McDonald, Ryan Meskell kick good	30	7
3	3:35	3	70	1:24	HAW	Cedric Byrd 55-yard touchdown reception from Cole McDonald, Ryan Meskell kick good	37	7
3	2:20	3	75	1:15	CSU	Preston Williams 7-yard touchdown reception from K. J. Carta-Samuels, Wyatt Bryan kick good	37	14
3	0:08	2	72	0:24	CSU	Bisi Johnson 58-yard touchdown reception from K. J. Carta-Samuels, 2-point pass failed	37	20
4	8:15	4	99	1:06	CSU	Preston Williams 26-yard touchdown reception from K. J. Carta-Samuels, Wyatt Bryan kick good	37	27
4	6:42	5	63	1:33	HAW	30-yard field goal by Ryan Meskell	40	27
4	4:42	8	75	2:00	CSU	Izzy Matthews 9-yard touchdown reception from K. J. Carta-Samuels, Wyatt Bryan kick good	40	34
4	0:44	9	58	3:58	HAW	35-yard field goal by Ryan Meskell	43	34
"TOP" = time of possession. For other American football terms, see Glossary of American football.							43	34

=== Navy ===
	1	2	3	4	Total
Midshipmen	0	14	14	13	41
Rainbow Warriors	14	24	0	21	59

Scoring summary

Quarter	Time	Drive			Team	Scoring information	Score	
Quarter	Time	Plays	Yards	TOP	Team	Scoring information	NAVY	HAW
1	9:12	12	75	5:48	HAW	Cedric Byrd 7-yard touchdown reception from Cole McDonald, Ryan Meskell kick good	0	7
1	3:13	10	71	4:00	HAW	Fred Holly III 1-yard touchdown run, Ryan Meskell kick good	0	14
2	13:18	4	40	1:37	HAW	JoJo Ward 34-yard touchdown reception from Cole McDonald, Ryan Meskell kick good	0	21
2	11:08				HAW	Maxwell Hendrie blocked punt returned 19-yard touchdown, Ryan Meskell kick good	0	28
2	6:52	8	75	4:16	NAVY	Zach Abey 3-yard touchdown run, Bennett Moehring kick good	7	28
2	4:17	6	75	2:35	HAW	John Ursua 50-yard touchdown reception from Cole McDonald, Ryan Meskell kick good	7	35
2	4:02	1	75	0:15	NAVY	Malcolm Perry 75-yard touchdown run, Bennett Moehring kick good	14	35
2	0:00	12	71	4:02	HAW	23-yard field goal by Ryan Meskell	14	38
3	8:08	12	75	6:52	NAVY	Zach Abey 1-yard touchdown run, Bennett Moehring kick good	21	38
3	6:35	3	9	0:58	NAVY	Zach Abey 7-yard touchdown run, Bennett Moehring kick good	28	38
4	14:07	7	71	2:11	HAW	Cedric Byrd 31-yard touchdown reception from Cole McDonald, Ryan Meskell kick good	28	45
4	12:06	6	75	2:01	NAVY	Tre Walker 19-yard touchdown reception from Malcolm Perry, Bennett Moehring kick good	35	45
4	14:07	2	78	0:54	HAW	JoJo Ward 75-yard touchdown reception from Cole McDonald, Ryan Meskell kick good	35	52
4	4:45	9	60	4:26	HAW	JoJo Ward 9-yard touchdown reception from Cole McDonald, John Ursua kick good	35	59
4	2:46	11	75	2:46	NAVY	Zach Abey 2-yard touchdown run, 2-point run failed	41	59
"TOP" = time of possession. For other American football terms, see Glossary of American football.							41	59

Sophomore quarterback Cole McDonald was named Mountain West Offensive player of the week. He finished 30–41 for 428 yards and six touchdowns.

=== Rice ===
	1	2	3	4	Total
Owls	7	3	3	16	29
Rainbow Warriors	14	7	7	15	43

=== At Army ===
	1	2	3	4	Total
Rainbow Warriors	7	7	0	7	21
Black Knights	7	14	0	7	28

=== Duquesne ===
	1	2	3	4	Total
Dukes	14	0	0	7	21
Rainbow Warriors	7	14	7	14	42

=== At San Jose State ===
	1	2	3	4	OT	2OT	3OT	4OT	5OT	Total
Rainbow Warriors	3	7	6	15	7	0	0	3	3	44
Spartans	0	17	7	7	7	0	0	3	0	41

=== Wyoming ===
	1	2	3	4	Total
Cowboys	3	0	7	3	13
Rainbow Warriors	0	3	7	7	17

=== At BYU ===
	1	2	3	4	Total
Rainbow Warriors	0	3	14	6	23
Cougars	14	14	7	14	49

=== Nevada ===
	1	2	3	4	Total
Wolf Pack	10	10	6	14	40
Rainbow Warriors	14	0	0	8	22

=== At Fresno State ===
	1	2	3	4	Total
Rainbow Warriors	3	10	0	7	20
Bulldogs	14	23	10	3	50

=== Utah State ===
	1	2	3	4	Total
No. 18 Aggies	28	0	28	0	56
Rainbow Warriors	3	0	14	0	17

=== UNLV ===
	1	2	3	4	Total
Rebels	7	14	0	7	28
Rainbow Warriors	3	3	7	22	35

=== At San Diego State ===
	1	2	3	4	OT	Total
Rainbow Warriors	3	21	0	0	7	31
Aztecs	14	0	3	7	6	30

=== Louisiana Tech–Hawaii Bowl ===
	1	2	3	4	Total
Bulldogs	3	0	21	7	31
Rainbow Warriors	0	7	0	7	14

== Players drafted into the NFL ==
Round	Pick	Player	Position	NFL Club
2	43	Jahlani Tavai	LB	Detroit Lions
7	236	John Ursua	WR	Seattle Seahawks
