= 2018 New Mexico Lobos football team =

American college football season

2018 New Mexico Lobos football
- Conference: Mountain West Conference
- Mountain Division
- Record: 3–9 (1–7 MW)
- Head coach: Bob Davie (7th season)
- Offensive coordinator: Calvin Magee (1st season)
- Offensive scheme: Spread
- Defensive coordinator: Kevin Cosgrove (5th season)
- Base defense: 3–4
- Home stadium: Dreamstyle Stadium

2018 Mountain West Conference football standings
	Conf.			Overall
Team	W		L	W		L
Mountain Division
No. 23 Boise State x	7	–	1	10	–	3
No. 22 Utah State	7	–	1	11	–	2
Wyoming	4	–	4	6	–	6
Air Force	3	–	5	5	–	7
Colorado State	2	–	6	3	–	9
New Mexico	1	–	7	3	–	9
West Division
No. 18 Fresno State x$	7	–	1	12	–	2
Nevada	5	–	3	8	–	5
Hawaii	5	–	3	8	–	6
San Diego State	4	–	4	7	–	6
UNLV	2	–	6	4	–	8
San Jose State	1	–	7	1	–	11
Championship: Fresno State 19, Boise State 16 (OT)
$ – Conference champion; x – Division champion/co-champions; y – Championship game participant; Rankings from AP Poll

The 2018 New Mexico Lobos football team represented the University of New Mexico as a member of the Mountain Division in the Mountain West Conference (MW) during the 2018 NCAA Division I FBS football season. Led by seventh-year head coach Bob Davie, the Lobos compiled an overall record of 3–9 with a mark of 1–7 in conference play, placing last out of six teams in the MW's Mountain Division. They were outscored by a total of 434 to 319. The team played home games at Dreamstyle Stadium in Albuquerque, New Mexico.

== Schedule ==
Date	Time	Opponent	Site	TV	Result	Attendance
September 1	6:00 p.m.	Incarnate Word*	Dreamstyle Stadium; Albuquerque, NM	ESPN3	W 62–30	18,213
September 8	10:00 a.m.	at No. 5 Wisconsin*	Camp Randall Stadium; Madison, WI	BTN	L 14–45	77,003
September 15	6:00 p.m.	at New Mexico State*	Aggie Memorial Stadium; Las Cruces, NM (Rio Grande Rivalry)	ELVN	W 42–25	20,673
September 29	4:00 p.m.	Liberty*^{†}	Dreamstyle Stadium; Albuquerque, NM		L 43–52	18,804
October 6	2:00 p.m.	at UNLV	Sam Boyd Stadium; Whitney, NV	ATTSNRM	W 50–14	18,949
October 13	2:00 p.m.	at Colorado State	Canvas Stadium; Fort Collins, CO	ATTSNRM	L 18–20	36,514
October 20	5:30 p.m.	Fresno State	Dreamstyle Stadium; Albuquerque, NM	ESPNU	L 7–38	16,708
October 27	2:00 p.m.	at Utah State	Maverik Stadium; Logan, UT	Stadium	L 19–61	16,119
November 3	8:15 p.m.	San Diego State	Dreamstyle Stadium; Albuquerque, NM	ESPNU	L 23–31	14,646
November 10	1:30 p.m.	at Air Force	Falcon Stadium; Colorado Springs, CO	CBSSN	L 24–42	23,723
November 16	7:00 p.m.	No. 23 Boise State	Dreamstyle Stadium; Albuquerque, NM	CBSSN	L 14–45	16,883
November 24	12:30 p.m.	Wyoming	Dreamstyle Stadium; Albuquerque, NM	ATTSNRM	L 3–31	14,269
*Non-conference game; ^{†}Homecoming; Rankings from AP Poll released prior to the game; All times are in Mountain time

== Preseason ==
=== Award watch lists ===
Award	Player	Position	Year
Earl Campbell Tyler Rose Award	Tyrone Owens	RB	SR

=== Mountain West media days ===
During the Mountain West media days held July 24–25 at the Cosmopolitan on the Las Vegas Strip, the Lobos were predicted to finish in last place in the Mountain Division.

==== Preseason All-Mountain West Team ====
The Lobos had one player selected to the preseason all-Mountain West team.

Offense

Aaron Jenkins – OL

== Game summaries ==
=== Incarnate Word ===
	1	2	3	4	Total
Cardinals	7	9	0	14	30
Lobos	28	7	13	14	62

=== At Wisconsin ===
	1	2	3	4	Total
Lobos	7	0	0	7	14
No. 5 Badgers	3	7	14	21	45

=== At New Mexico State ===
	1	2	3	4	Total
Lobos	7	14	7	14	42
Aggies	17	0	0	8	25

=== Liberty ===
	1	2	3	4	Total
Flames	21	21	0	10	52
Lobos	7	3	13	20	43

=== At UNLV ===
	1	2	3	4	Total
Lobos	0	29	7	14	50
Rebels	0	0	0	14	14

=== At Colorado State ===
	1	2	3	4	Total
Lobos	0	3	8	7	18
Rams	7	7	3	3	20

=== Fresno State ===
	1	2	3	4	Total
Bulldogs	10	14	14	0	38
Lobos	0	7	0	0	7

=== At Utah State ===
	1	2	3	4	Total
Lobos	3	2	14	0	19
Aggies	28	24	9	0	61

=== San Diego State ===
	1	2	3	4	Total
Aztecs	7	0	7	17	31
Lobos	7	3	6	7	23

=== At Air Force ===
	1	2	3	4	Total
Lobos	0	17	7	0	24
Falcons	7	14	14	7	42

=== Boise State ===
	1	2	3	4	Total
No. 23 Broncos	14	10	7	14	45
Lobos	0	7	0	7	14

=== Wyoming ===
	1	2	3	4	Total
Cowboys	7	7	3	14	31
Lobos	0	3	0	0	3

== Roster ==
2018 New Mexico Lobos football team roster
Players			Coaches
Offense: Pos. / # / Name / Class	Defense: Pos. / # / Name / Class	Special teams: Pos. / # / Name / Class	Head coach: Bob Davie; Coordinators/assistant coaches: Kevin Cosgrove – Defensive coordinator / Linebackers; Legend: (C) Team captain; (S) Suspended; (I) Ineligible; Injured; Redshirt; Roster
