= 2018 Colorado State Rams football team =

American college football season

2018 Colorado State Rams football
- Conference: Mountain West Conference
- Mountain Division
- Record: 3–9 (2–6 MW)
- Head coach: Mike Bobo (4th season)
- Offensive coordinator: Dave Johnson (1st season)
- Offensive scheme: Pro spread
- Defensive coordinator: John Jancek (1st season)
- Base defense: 4–3
- Home stadium: Canvas Stadium

Uniform
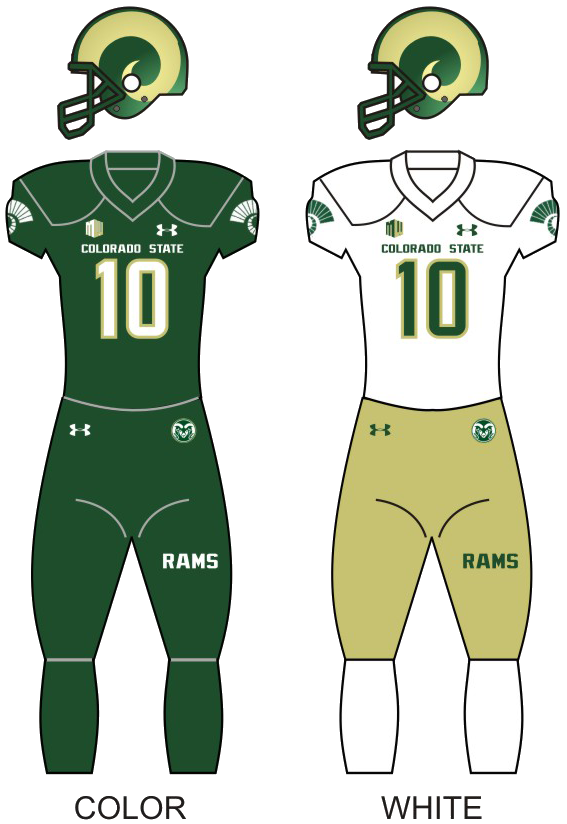

2018 Mountain West Conference football standings
	Conf.			Overall
Team	W		L	W		L
Mountain Division
No. 23 Boise State x	7	–	1	10	–	3
No. 22 Utah State	7	–	1	11	–	2
Wyoming	4	–	4	6	–	6
Air Force	3	–	5	5	–	7
Colorado State	2	–	6	3	–	9
New Mexico	1	–	7	3	–	9
West Division
No. 18 Fresno State x$	7	–	1	12	–	2
Nevada	5	–	3	8	–	5
Hawaii	5	–	3	8	–	6
San Diego State	4	–	4	7	–	6
UNLV	2	–	6	4	–	8
San Jose State	1	–	7	1	–	11
Championship: Fresno State 19, Boise State 16 (OT)
$ – Conference champion; x – Division champion/co-champions; y – Championship game participant; Rankings from AP Poll

The 2018 Colorado State Rams football team represented Colorado State University during the 2018 NCAA Division I FBS football season. The Rams were led by fourth-year head coach Mike Bobo and played their home games at Sonny Lubick Field at Canvas Stadium in Fort Collins, Colorado as members of the Mountain Division of the Mountain West Conference. They finished the season 3–9, 2–6 in Mountain West play to finish in fifth place in the Mountain Division.

== Preseason ==
=== Award watch lists ===
Listed in the order that they were released

Award	Player	Position	Year
Doak Walker Award	Izzy Matthews	RB	SR
John Mackey Award	Cameron Butler	TE	SO
Lou Groza Award	Wyatt Bryan	K	SR
Ray Guy Award	Ryan Stonehouse	P	SO
Wuerffel Trophy	Adam Prentice	RB	SO
Johnny Unitas Golden Arm Award	K. J. Carta-Samuels	QB	SR

=== Mountain West media days ===
During the Mountain West media days held July 24–25 at the Cosmopolitan on the Las Vegas Strip, the Rams were predicted to finish in third place in the Mountain Division.

==== Preseason All-Mountain West Team ====
The Rams had one player selected to the preseason all-Mountain West team.

Specialists

Ryan Stonehouse – P

== Schedule ==
Date	Time	Opponent	Site	TV	Result	Attendance
August 25	5:30 p.m.	Hawaii	Canvas Stadium; Fort Collins, CO	CBSSN	L 34–43	31,007
August 31	7:30 p.m.	vs. Colorado*	Broncos Stadium at Mile High; Denver, CO (Rocky Mountain Showdown)	CBSSN	L 13–45	70,158
September 8	5:30 p.m.	Arkansas*	Canvas Stadium; Fort Collins, CO	CBSSN	W 34–27	31,894
September 15	2:00 p.m.	at Florida*	Ben Hill Griffin Stadium; Gainesville, FL	SECN	L 10–48	80,021
September 22	1:00 p.m.	No. 16 (FCS) Illinois State*	Canvas Stadium; Fort Collins, CO	ATTSNRM	L 19–35	26,259
October 6	8:30 p.m.	at San Jose State	CEFCU Stadium; San Jose, CA	CBSSN	W 42–30	13,802
October 13	2:00 p.m.	New Mexico^{†}	Canvas Stadium; Fort Collins, CO	ATTSNRM	W 20–18	36,514
October 19	7:00 p.m.	at Boise State	Albertsons Stadium; Boise, ID	ESPN2	L 28–56	32,299
October 26	8:00 p.m.	Wyoming	Canvas Stadium; Fort Collins, CO (The Border War)	CBSSN	L 21–34	32,125
November 10	8:30 p.m.	at Nevada	Mackay Stadium; Reno, NV	ESPNU	L 10–49	13,755
November 17	12:00 p.m.	No. 14 Utah State	Canvas Stadium; Fort Collins, CO	ATTSNRM	L 24–29	19,226
November 22	1:30 p.m.	at Air Force	Falcon Stadium; Colorado Springs, CO (Ram–Falcon Trophy)	CBSSN	L 19–27	17,432
*Non-conference game; ^{†}Homecoming; Rankings from AP Poll released prior to the game; All times are in Mountain time

== Game summaries ==
=== Hawaii ===
	1	2	3	4	Total
Rainbow Warriors	10	13	14	6	43
Rams	7	0	13	14	34

Scoring summary

Quarter	Time	Drive			Team	Scoring information	Score	
Quarter	Time	Plays	Yards	TOP	Team	Scoring information	HAW	CSU
1	10:02	10	75	4:58	HAW	John Ursua 4-yard touchdown reception from Cole McDonald, Ryan Meskell kick good	7	0
1	5:26	14	85	4:26	CSU	Bisi Johnson 10-yard touchdown reception from K.J. Carta-Samuels, Wyatt Bryan kick good	7	7
1	1:18	9	72	4:08	HAW	21-yard field goal by Ryan Meskell	10	7
2	11:32	9	67	3:53	HAW	Cole McDonald 12-yard touchdown run, 2-point pass failed	16	7
2	0:28	6	46	1:43	HAW	Cole McDonald 6-yard touchdown run, Ryan Meskell kick good	23	7
3	8:48	7	75	3:34	HAW	John Ursua 19-yard touchdown reception from Cole McDonald, Ryan Meskell kick good	30	7
3	3:35	3	70	1:24	HAW	Cedric Byrd 55-yard touchdown reception from Cole McDonald, Ryan Meskell kick good	37	7
3	2:20	3	75	1:15	CSU	Preston Williams 7-yard touchdown reception from K.J. Carta-Samuels, Wyatt Bryan kick good	37	14
3	0:08	2	72	0:24	CSU	Bisi Johnson 58-yard touchdown reception from K.J. Carta-Samuels, 2-point pass failed	37	20
4	8:15	4	99	1:06	CSU	Preston Williams 26-yard touchdown reception from K.J. Carta-Samuels, Wyatt Bryan kick good	37	27
4	6:42	5	63	1:33	HAW	30-yard field goal by Ryan Meskell	40	27
4	4:42	8	75	2:00	CSU	Izzy Matthews 9-yard touchdown reception from K.J. Carta-Samuels, Wyatt Bryan kick good	40	34
4	0:44	9	58	3:58	HAW	35-yard field goal by Ryan Meskell	43	34
"TOP" = time of possession. For other American football terms, see Glossary of American football.							43	34

=== vs Colorado ===
	1	2	3	4	Total
Buffaloes	21	7	17	0	45
Rams	7	3	0	3	13

Scoring summary

Quarter	Time	Drive			Team	Scoring information	Score	
Quarter	Time	Plays	Yards	TOP	Team	Scoring information	CU	CSU
1	13:36	5	75	1:24	CU	Steven Montez 38-yard touchdown run, James Stefanou kick good	7	0
1	8:17	5	87	1:37	CU	K.D. Nixon 46-yard touchdown reception from Steven Montez, James Stefanou kick good	14	0
1	5:54	7	75	2:23	CSU	Bisi Johnson 26-yard touchdown reception from K.J. Carta-Samuels, Wyatt Bryan kick good	14	7
1	3:25	9	75	2:29	CU	Beau Bisharat 4-yard touchdown reception from Steven Montez, James Stefanou kick good	21	7
2	6:14	8	48	3:23	CU	Juwann Winfree 4-yard touchdown reception from Steven Montez, James Stefanou kick good	28	7
2	0:00	7	31	0:52	CSU	51-yard field goal by Wyatt Bryan	28	10
3	12:41	3	85	1:18	CU	Laviska Shenault Jr. 89-yard touchdown reception from Steven Montez, James Stefanou kick good	35	10
3	8:46	5	70	1:32	CU	Travon McMillian 49-yard touchdown run, James Stefanou kick good	42	10
3	3:23	9	45	4:03	CU	39-yard field goal by James Stefanou	45	10
4	8:39	10	49	3:41	CSU	27-yard field goal by Wyatt Bryan	45	13
"TOP" = time of possession. For other American football terms, see Glossary of American football.							45	13

=== Arkansas ===
	1	2	3	4	Total
Razorbacks	7	6	14	0	27
Rams	3	6	8	17	34

Scoring summary

Quarter	Time	Drive			Team	Scoring information	Score	
Quarter	Time	Plays	Yards	TOP	Team	Scoring information	ARK	CSU
1	12:26	4	6	1:31	CSU	55-yard field goal by Wyatt Bryan	0	3
1	2:02	14	73	6:06	ARK	Devwah Whaley 3-yard touchdown run, Connor Limpert kick good	7	3
2	9:37	10	70	4:04	ARK	28-yard field goal by Connor Limpert	10	3
2	6:28	8	65	2:40	ARK	31-yard field goal by Connor Limpert	13	3
2	3:00	10	47	3:28	CSU	46-yard field goal by Wyatt Bryan	13	6
2	0:32	5	18	0:25	CSU	44-yard field goal by Wyatt Bryan	13	9
3	8:35	9	91	3:51	ARK	La'Michael Pettway 25-yard touchdown reception from Cole Kelley, Connor Limpert kick good	20	9
3	7:28	1	64	0:11	ARK	T.J. Hammonds 64-yard touchdown reception from Cole Kelley, Connor Limpert kick good	27	9
3	2:46	7	70	2:41	CSU	Preston Williams 4-yard touchdown reception from K.J. Carta-Samuels, 2-point pass successful	27	17
4	11:07	9	96	3:29	CSU	Preston Williams 10-yard touchdown reception from K.J. Carta-Samuels, Wyatt Bryan kick good	27	24
4	5:19	11	60	4:03	CSU	22-yard field goal by Wyatt Bryan	27	27
4	0:08	6	59	2:30	CSU	Izzy Matthews 1-yard touchdown run, Connor Limpert kick good	27	34
"TOP" = time of possession. For other American football terms, see Glossary of American football.							27	34

=== At Florida ===
	1	2	3	4	Total
Rams	0	3	7	0	10
Gators	6	21	0	21	48

Scoring summary

Quarter	Time	Drive			Team	Scoring information	Score	
Quarter	Time	Plays	Yards	TOP	Team	Scoring information	CSU	FLA
1	10:48	4	4	1:37	FLA	24-yard field goal by Evan McPherson	0	3
1	2:14	4	-2	0:56	FLA	48-yard field goal by Evan McPherson	0	6
2	11:49	5	65	1:44	FLA	Jordan Scarlett 30-yard touchdown run, Evan McPherson kick good	0	13
2	6:24	6	44	3:13	FLA	Freddie Swain 18-yard touchdown reception from Feleipe Franks, Evan McPherson kick good	0	20
2	4:02				FLA	Tyrie Cleveland 0 Yd Return of Blocked Punt, Evan McPherson kick good	0	27
2	0:00	9	13	3:53	CSU	53-yard field goal by Wyatt Bryan	3	27
3	11:75	7	75	3:33	CSU	Trey McBride 48-yard touchdown reception from K.J. Carta-Samuels, Wyatt Bryan kick good	10	27
4	13:25				FLA	Freddie Swain 85 Yd Punt Return, Evan McPherson kick good	10	34
4	9:21	4	54	1:47	FLA	Van Jefferson 38-yard touchdown reception from Feleipe Franks, Evan McPherson kick good	10	41
4	6:17	1	68	0:12	FLA	Dameon Pierce 68-yard touchdown run, Evan McPherson kick good	10	48
"TOP" = time of possession. For other American football terms, see Glossary of American football.							10	48

=== Illinois State ===
	1	2	3	4	Total
No. 16 (FCS) Redbirds	0	14	7	14	35
Rams	6	0	7	6	19

Scoring summary

Quarter	Time	Drive			Team	Scoring information	Score	
Quarter	Time	Plays	Yards	TOP	Team	Scoring information	ILST	CSU
1	2:21	14	80	5:27	CSU	Bisi Johnson 9-yard touchdown reception from K.J. Carta-Samuels, Evan McPherson kick fail	0	6
2	10:42	6	20	2:02	ILST	James Robinson 2-yard touchdown run, Sam Fenlason kick good	7	6
2	0:02	16	80	5:16	FLA	Markel Smith 1-yard touchdown run, Sam Fenlason kick good	14	6
3	12:35	5	75	2:25	ILST	Tylor Petkovich 12-yard touchdown reception from Brady Davis, Sam Fenlason kick good	21	6
3	4:00	7	60	3:02	CSU	Nikko Hall 17-yard touchdown reception from K.J. Carta-Samuels, Wyatt Bryan kick good	21	13
4	9:25	3	51	1:17	ILST	Markel Smith 60-yard touchdown reception from Brady Davis, Sam Fenlason kick good	28	13
4	2:48	1	57	0:10	ILST	James Robinson 57-yard touchdown run, Sam Fenlason kick good	35	13
4	1:36	5	40	1:01	CSU	Marvin Kinsey Jr. 14-yard touchdown reception from Collin Hill, 2-point pass failed	35	19
"TOP" = time of possession. For other American football terms, see Glossary of American football.							35	19

=== At San Jose State ===
	1	2	3	4	Total
Rams	14	14	0	14	42
Spartans	0	0	30	0	30

=== New Mexico ===
	1	2	3	4	Total
Lobos	0	3	8	7	18
Rams	7	7	3	3	20

=== At Boise State ===
	1	2	3	4	Total
Rams	0	7	7	14	28
Broncos	21	14	7	14	56

=== Wyoming ===
	1	2	3	4	Total
Cowboys	0	3	21	10	34
Rams	0	0	7	14	21

=== At Nevada ===
	1	2	3	4	Total
Rams	0	0	0	10	10
Wolf Pack	7	21	21	0	49

=== Utah State ===
	1	2	3	4	Total
No. 14 Aggies	3	7	10	9	29
Rams	0	7	3	14	24

=== At Air Force ===
	1	2	3	4	Total
Rams	0	13	0	6	19
Falcons	7	10	0	10	27

== Players in the 2019 NFL draft ==
Round	Pick	Player	Position	NFL Club
7	247	Bisi Johnson	WR	Minnesota Vikings
