= 2018 Mountain West Conference Football Championship Game =

- Conference Championship
| Fresno State Bulldogs | Boise State Broncos |
| (10–2) | (10–2) |
| 19 | 16 |
| Head coach: Jeff Tedford | Head coach: Bryan Harsin |
| AP / Coaches / CFP; 25 / 23 / 25 | AP / Coaches / CFP; 19 / 20 / 22 |
| | 1 | 2 | 3 | 4 | OT | Total |
|---|---|---|---|---|---|---|
| Fresno State | 7 | 3 | 3 | 0 | 6 | 19 |
| Boise State | 7 | 0 | 0 | 6 | 3 | 16 |
- Date: December 1, 2018
- Season: 2018
- Stadium: Albertsons Stadium
- Location: Boise, ID
- MVP: Alexander Mattison (Offense, Boise State); Mykal Walker (Defense, Fresno State)
- Favorite: Boise State by 1.5
- Attendance: 23,662

United States TV coverage
- Network: ESPN
- Announcers: Steve Levy (Play-By-Play); Brian Griese (Analyst); Todd McShay (Sidelines)

2018 Mountain West Conference football standings
| | Conf. | | | Overall |
| Team | W | | L | W | | L |
|---|---|---|---|---|---|---|
Mountain Division
| No. 23 Boise State x | 7 | – | 1 | 10 | – | 3 |
| No. 22 Utah State | 7 | – | 1 | 11 | – | 2 |
| Wyoming | 4 | – | 4 | 6 | – | 6 |
| Air Force | 3 | – | 5 | 5 | – | 7 |
| Colorado State | 2 | – | 6 | 3 | – | 9 |
| New Mexico | 1 | – | 7 | 3 | – | 9 |
West Division
| No. 18 Fresno State x$ | 7 | – | 1 | 12 | – | 2 |
| Nevada | 5 | – | 3 | 8 | – | 5 |
| Hawaii | 5 | – | 3 | 8 | – | 6 |
| San Diego State | 4 | – | 4 | 7 | – | 6 |
| UNLV | 2 | – | 6 | 4 | – | 8 |
| San Jose State | 1 | – | 7 | 1 | – | 11 |
Championship: Fresno State 19, Boise State 16 (OT)
$ – Conference champion; x – Division champion/co-champions; y – Championship game participant; Rankings from AP Poll

The 2018 Mountain West Conference Championship Game was played on Saturday, December 1, 2018, at Albertsons Stadium in Boise, Idaho, to determine the 2018 football champion of the Mountain West Conference (MW). For the second consecutive year, the game featured the West Division champion Fresno State Bulldogs visiting the Mountain Division champion Boise State Broncos. The game was broadcast nationally by ESPN for the fourth consecutive year.

Both Boise State and Fresno State finished the conference season with a 7–1 record. Boise State earned the right to host the championship due to their win over Fresno State on November 9 in Boise. After also meeting twice during the 2017 season, this was the fourth time the two teams met in a span of 372 days.

The 2018 championship game was the sixth edition of the event. In the 2017 championship game, Boise State defeated Fresno State 17–14. The two schools also met in the 2014 game.

In a low-scoring game on a snow-covered field, the teams played to a 13–13 tie through regulation. In overtime, Boise State was held to a field goal, while Fresno State scored a touchdown to win, 19–16.

== Teams ==
=== Fresno State ===
The Bulldogs finished the season 10–2 overall record, with a 7–1 conference record to be champions of the West Division. Their only conference loss came to Boise State. Fresno State enters the game ranked No. 25 in the College Football Playoff rankings and AP poll.

=== Boise State ===
Boise State finished with a 10–2 overall record, with a 7–1 conference record, with their only conference loss coming to San Diego State. The Broncos tied Utah State for first place in the Mountain Division. However, the Broncos won the head-to-head meeting to be crowned Mountain Division champions as the Mountain West does not recognize co-champions in a two-way tie. Boise State enters the game ranked No. 22 in the College Football Playoff rankings, No. 19 in the AP poll, and No. 20 in the Coaches poll.

== Game summary ==
=== Scoring summary ===
Scoring summary

| Quarter | Time | Drive | | | Team | Scoring information | Score | |
| Quarter | Time | Plays | Yards | TOP | Team | Scoring information | FRES | BSU |
|---|---|---|---|---|---|---|---|---|
| 1 | 9:03 | 3 | 20 | 1:08 | FRES | Michiah Quick 15-yard touchdown reception from Marcus McMaryion, Asa Fuller kick good | 7 | 0 |
| 1 | 1:56 | 15 | 75 | 7:07 | BSU | Sean Modster 10-yard touchdown reception from Brett Rypien, Haden Hoggarth kick good | 7 | 7 |
| 2 | 3:20 | 10 | 51 | 3:32 | FRES | 44-yard field goal by Asa Fuller | 10 | 7 |
| 3 | 11:07 | 9 | 43 | 3:53 | FRES | 38-yard field goal by Asa Fuller | 13 | 7 |
| 4 | 8:01 | 7 | 87 | 3:09 | BSU | Alexander Mattison 34-yard touchdown run, Haden Hoggarth kick blocked | 13 | 13 |
| OT | | 6 | 19 | | BSU | 23-yard field goal by Haden Hoggarth | 13 | 16 |
| OT | | 5 | 25 | | FRES | Ronnie Rivers 1-yard touchdown run | 19 | 16 |
| "TOP" = time of possession. For other American football terms, see Glossary of American football. | | | | | | | 19 | 16 |

=== Statistics ===
| | 1 | 2 | 3 | 4 | OT | Total |
|---|---|---|---|---|---|---|
| No. 25 Bulldogs | 7 | 3 | 3 | 0 | 6 | 19 |
| No. 19 Broncos | 7 | 0 | 0 | 6 | 3 | 16 |

| Statistics | Fresno State | Boise State |
|---|---|---|
| Total yards | 288 | 350 |
| Passing yards | 170 | 125 |
| Rushing yards | 118 | 225 |
| First downs | 14 | 22 |
| Penalties | 6-50 | 6-50 |
| Turnovers | 2 | 1 |
| Time of Possession | 23:58 | 36:02 |
