= 2018 Pac-12 Conference football season =

American college football season

- League: NCAA Division I Football Bowl Subdivision
- Sport: Football
- Duration: August 30, 2018 through January 1, 2019
- Teams: 12
- TV partner(s): Fox Sports Media Group, (Fox, FS1), ESPN Family (ABC, ESPN, ESPN2, ESPNU), and Pac-12 Networks

2019 NFL Draft
- Top draft pick: OT Andre Dillard, Washington State
- Picked by: Philadelphia Eagles, 22nd overall

Regular season
- Season MVP: Gardner Minshew, QB, Washington State
- Top scorer: Matt Gay, K, Utah Utes (112 points)
- North champions: Washington Huskies; Washington State
- North runners-up: Stanford Cardinal
- South champions: Utah Utes
- South runners-up: Arizona State Sun Devils

Pac–12 Championship
- Champions: Washington Huskies
- Runners-up: Utah Utes
- Finals MVP: Byron Murphy, CB

Football seasons
- 2017 2019

2018 Pac-12 Conference football standings
	Conf.			Overall
Team	W		L	W		L
North Division
No. 13 Washington xy$	7	–	2	10	–	4
No. 10 Washington State x	7	–	2	11	–	2
Stanford	6	–	3	9	–	4
Oregon	5	–	4	9	–	4
California	4	–	5	7	–	6
Oregon State	1	–	8	2	–	10
South Division
Utah xy	6	–	3	9	–	5
Arizona State	5	–	4	7	–	6
USC	4	–	5	5	–	7
Arizona	4	–	5	5	–	7
UCLA	3	–	6	3	–	9
Colorado	2	–	7	5	–	7
Championship: Washington 10, Utah 3
$ – Conference champion; x – Division champion/co-champions; y – Championship game participant; Rankings from AP Poll

The 2018 Pac-12 Conference football season represented the 40th season of Pac-12 football that took place during the 2018 NCAA Division I FBS football season. The season began on August 30, 2018, and ended with 2018 Pac-12 Championship Game on November 30 at Levi Stadium in Santa Clara, California. The Pac-12 was a Power Five conference under the College Football Playoff format along with the Atlantic Coast Conference, the Big 12 Conference, the Big Ten Conference, and the Southeastern Conference. The 2018 season was the Pac-12's eighth for the twelve teams divided into two divisions of six each, named North and South.

== Preseason ==
2018 Pac-12 Spring Football and number of signees on signing day:

North Division

- California – 21
- Oregon – 22
- Oregon State – 20
- Stanford – 15
- Washington – 21
- Washington State – 26

South Division

- Arizona – 21
- Arizona State – 21
- Colorado – 21
- UCLA – 28
- USC – 18
- Utah – 20

=== Recruiting classes ===
Rankings
Team	ESPN	Rivals	Scout & 24/7	Signees
Arizona	63	54	58	21
Arizona State	47	36	36	21
California	50	44	42	22
Colorado	42	51	53	21
Oregon	17	13	13	24
Oregon State	65	67	67	25
Stanford	38	57	39	15
UCLA	19	19	19	27
USC	7	3	4	18
Utah	45	38	34	23
Washington	15	15	14	21
Washington State	44	46	45	27

=== Pac-12 Media Days ===
The Pac-12 conducted its annual media days at the Loews Hollywood Hotel, – The Loews Hollywood Hotel in Hollywood, CA on July 25. The event commenced with a speech by Pac-12 commissioner Larry Scott, and all 12 teams sent their head coaches and two selected players to speak with members of the media. The event along with all speakers and interviews were broadcast live on the Pac-12 Network. The teams and representatives in respective order were as follows:

- Pac-12 Commissioner – Larry Scott
- California – Justin Wilcox (HC), Patrick Laird (RB) & Jordan Kunaszyk (LB)
- Stanford – David Shaw (HC), J. J. Arcega-Whiteside (WR) & Alijah Holder (CB)
- Washington State – Mike Leach (HC), Kyle Sweet (WR/P) & Jalen Thompson (S)
- Washington – Chris Petersen (HC), Jake Browning (QB) & Jojo McIntosh (DB)
- Oregon State – Jonathan Smith (HC), Blake Brandel (OL) & Kee Whetzel (LB)
- Oregon – Mario Cristobal (HC), Justin Herbert (QB) & Jalen Jelks (DL)
- Pac-12 Commissioner – Larry Scott (Q&A)
- UCLA – Chip Kelly (HC), Theo Howard (WR) & Josh Woods (LB)
- Colorado – Mike MacIntyre (HC), Rick Gamboa (LB) & Steven Montez (QB)
- Arizona State – Herm Edwards (HC), N'Keal Harry (WR) & Manny Wilkins (QB)
- Arizona – Kevin Sumlin (HC), Khalil Tate (QB) & Colin Schooler (LB)
- Utah – Kyle Whittingham (HC), Chase Hansen (LB) & Lo Falemaka (OL)
- USC – Clay Helton (HC), Cameron Smith (LB) & Porter Gustin (LB)
- Pac-12 VP of Officiating – David Coleman (Q&A on 2018 football playing rule changes)

==== Preseason media polls ====
The Pac-12 Media Days concluded with its annual preseason media polls on July 25, 2018. Since 1992, the credentialed media has gotten the preseason champion correct just five times. Only eight times has the preseason pick even made it to the Pac-12 title game. Below are the results of the media poll with total points received next to each school and first-place votes in parentheses.

Pac-12 Champion Voting

- Washington (37)
- USC (2)
- Oregon (1)
- Stanford (1)
- UCLA (1)

North Division

1. Washington (40) – 249
2. Stanford (1) – 198
3. Oregon (1) – 178
4. California – 108
5. Washington State – 98
6. Oregon State – 45

South Division

1. USC (22) – 225
2. Utah (14) – 209
3. Arizona (3) – 178
4. UCLA (2) – 116
5. Colorado (1) – 80
6. Arizona State – 72

- First place votes in ()

== Head coaches ==
=== Coaching changes ===
There were five coaching changes following the 2018 season including Kevin Sumlin with Arizona, Herm Edwards with Arizona State, Mario Cristobal with Oregon, Johnathan Smith with Oregon State & Chip Kelly with UCLA.

=== Coaches ===
Team	Head coach	Years at school	Overall record	Record at school	Pac-12 record
Arizona	Kevin Sumlin	1	86–43 (.667)	0–0 (–)	0–0 (–)
Arizona State	Herm Edwards	1	0–0 (–)	0–0 (–)	0–0 (–)
California	Justin Wilcox	2	5–7 (.417)	5–7 (.417)	2–7 (.222)
Colorado	Mike MacIntyre	6	40–59 (.404)	25–38 (.397)	12–33 (.267)
Oregon	Mario Cristobal	1	27–48 (.360)	0–1 (.000)	0–0 (–)
Oregon State	Jonathan Smith	1	0–0 (–)	0–0 (–)	0–0 (–)
Stanford	David Shaw	8	73–22 (.768)	73–22 (.768)	49–14 (.778)
UCLA	Chip Kelly	1	46–7 (.868)	0–0 (–)	33–3 (.917)
USC	Clay Helton	5	27–10 (.730)	27–10 (.730)	20–4 (.833)
Utah	Kyle Whittingham	14	111–56 (.665)	111–56 (.665)	28–35 (.444)
Washington	Chris Petersen	5	129–29 (.816)	37–17 (.685)	23–13 (.639)
Washington State	Mike Leach	7	122–81 (.601)	38–38 (.500)	26–28 (.481)

== Rankings ==
		Pre	Wk 2	Wk 3	Wk 4	Wk 5	Wk 6	Wk 7	Wk 8	Wk 9	Wk 10	Wk 11	Wk 12	Wk 13	Wk 14	Wk 15	Final
Arizona Wildcats	AP	RV															
Arizona Wildcats	C	RV															
Arizona Wildcats	CFP	Not released															
Arizona State Sun Devils	AP			23	RV	RV	RV						RV				
Arizona State Sun Devils	C			25	RV	RV	RV				RV		RV				
Arizona State Sun Devils	CFP	Not released															
California Golden Bears	AP				RV	24	RV				RV						
California Golden Bears	C				RV	RV	RV								RV		
California Golden Bears	CFP	Not released															
Colorado Buffaloes	AP			RV	RV	RV	21	19	RV								
Colorado Buffaloes	C			RV	RV	RV	22	18	25	RV							
Colorado Buffaloes	CFP	Not released															
Oregon Ducks	AP	24	23	20	20	19	18	17	12	19	RV	RV			RV	RV	RV
Oregon Ducks	C	RV	RV	23	19	20	18	17	11	21	RV	RV			RV	RV	RV
Oregon Ducks	CFP	Not released															
Oregon State Beavers	AP																
Oregon State Beavers	C																
Oregon State Beavers	CFP	Not released															
Stanford Cardinal	AP	13	10	9	7	7	14	RV	RV	24	RV		RV	RV	RV	RV	RV
Stanford Cardinal	C	13	9	9	7	7	14	24	24	23	RV				RV	RV	RV
Stanford Cardinal	CFP	Not released															
UCLA Bruins	AP																
UCLA Bruins	C																
UCLA Bruins	CFP	Not released															
USC Trojans	AP	15	17	22					RV								
USC Trojans	C	15	12	21		RV	RV		RV								
USC Trojans	CFP	Not released															
Utah Utes	AP	RV	RV	RV	RV	RV		RV		23	16	RV	21	18	17	20	RV
Utah Utes	C	RV	RV	RV	RV	RV		RV	RV	24	16	24	19	17	17	19	RV
Utah Utes	CFP	Not released									15		19	17	17	17	
Washington Huskies	AP	6	9	10	10т	11	10	7	15	15	RV	20	17	16	10	9	13
Washington Huskies	C	6	11	12	12	11	10	7	14	13	19	18	17	16	11	9	13
Washington Huskies	CFP	Not released										25	18	16	11	9	
Washington State Cougars	AP		RV	RV	RV		RV	RV	25	14	10	10	8	7	12	12	10
Washington State Cougars	C	RV	RV	RV	RV	RV	RV	RV	23	15	11	9	9	7	13	13	10
Washington State Cougars	CFP	Not released									8	8	8	8	13	13	

	Increase in ranking
	Decrease in ranking
	Not ranked previous week
	Selected for College Football Playoff
(Italics)	Number of first place votes
т	Tied with team above or below also with this symbol

== Schedules ==
Index to colors and formatting
Pac-12 member won
Pac-12 member lost
Pac-12 teams in **bold**

All times Pacific time. Pac-12 teams in bold.

Rankings reflect those of the AP poll for that week.

=== Regular season ===
==== Week 1 ====
Date	Time	Visiting team	Home team	Site	TV	Result	Attendance	Ref.
August 30	6:00 p.m.	Weber State	**Utah**	Rice–Eccles Stadium • Salt Lake City, UT	P12N	**W** 41–10	45,988	
August 31	6:00 p.m.	San Diego State	No. 13 **Stanford**	Stanford Stadium • Stanford, CA	FS1	**W** 31–10	40,913	
August 31	6:30 p.m.	**Colorado**	Colorado State	Broncos Stadium at Mile High • Denver, CO	CBSSN	**W** 45–13	70,158	
September 1	9:00 a.m.	**Oregon State**	No. 5 Ohio State	Ohio Stadium • Columbus, OH	ABC	**L** 31–77	102,169	
September 1	12:30 p.m.	No. 6 **Washington**	No. 9 Auburn	Mercedes-Benz Stadium • Atlanta, GA	ABC	**L** 16–21	70,103	
September 1	12:30 p.m.	**Washington State**	Wyoming	War Memorial Stadium • Laramie, WY	CBSSN	**W** 41–19	24,131	
September 1	1:00 p.m.	North Carolina	**California**	California Memorial Stadium • Berkeley, CA	FOX	**W** 24–17	42,168	
September 1	1:00 p.m.	UNLV	No. 15 **USC**	LA Memorial Coliseum • Los Angeles, CA	P12N	**W** 43–21	58,708	
September 1	4:00 p.m.	Cincinnati	**UCLA**	Rose Bowl • Pasadena, CA	ESPN	**L** 17–26	54,116	
September 1	5:00 p.m.	Bowling Green	No. 24 **Oregon**	Autzen Stadium • Eugene, OR	P12N	**W** 58–24	50,112	
September 1	7:30 p.m.	UTSA	**Arizona State**	Sun Devil Stadium • Tempe, AZ	FS1	**W** 49–7	50,188	
September 1	7:45 p.m.	BYU	**Arizona**	Arizona Stadium • Tucson, AZ	ESPN	**L** 23–28	51,002	
^{#}Rankings from AP Poll released prior to game. All times are in Pacific Time.

==== Week 2 ====
Date	Time	Visiting team	Home team	Site	TV	Result	Attendance	Ref.
September 8	9:00 a.m.	**Arizona**	Houston	TDECU Stadium • Houston, TX	ABC	**L** 18–45	32,534	
September 8	10:00 a.m.	**UCLA**	No. 6 Oklahoma	Gaylord Family Oklahoma Memorial Stadium • Norman, OK	FOX	**L** 21–49	86,402	
September 8	11:00 a.m.	Portland State	No. 23 **Oregon**	Autzen Stadium • Eugene, OR	P12N	**W** 62–14	47,210	
September 8	12:30 p.m.	**Colorado**	Nebraska	Memorial Stadium • Lincoln, NE	ABC	**W** 33–28	89,853	
September 8	2:00 p.m.	North Dakota	No. 9 **Washington**	Husky Stadium • Seattle, WA	P12N	**W** 45–3	68,093	
September 8	4:30 p.m.	**Utah**	Northern Illinois	Huskie Stadium • DeKalb, IL	ESPNews	**W** 17–6	16,762	
September 8	5:00 p.m.	Southern Utah	**Oregon State**	Reser Stadium • Corvallis, OR	P12N	**W** 48–25	36,448	
September 8	5:30 p.m.	No. 17 **USC**	No. 10 **Stanford**	Stanford Stadium • Stanford, CA	FOX	**STAN** 17–3	42,856	
September 8	6:45 p.m.	No. 15 Michigan State	**Arizona State**	Sun Devil Stadium • Tempe, AZ	ESPN	**W** 16–13	53,599	
September 8	7:15 p.m.	**California**	BYU	LaVell Edwards Stadium • Provo, UT	ESPN2	**W** 21–18	52,602	
September 8	8:00 p.m.	San Jose State	**Washington State**	Martin Stadium • Pullman, WA	P12N	**W** 31–0	26,141	
^{#}Rankings from AP Poll released prior to game. All times are in Pacific Time.

==== Week 3 ====
Date	Time	Visiting team	Home team	Site	TV	Result	Attendance	Ref.
September 15	11:00 a.m.	UC Davis	No. 9 **Stanford**	Stanford Stadium • Stanford, CA	P12N	**W** 30–10	31,772	
September 15	2:00 p.m.	San Jose State	No. 20 **Oregon**	Autzen Stadium • Eugene, OR	P12N	**W** 35–22	50,049	
September 15	2:00 p.m.	New Hampshire	**Colorado**	Folsom Field • Boulder, CO	P12N	**W** 45–14	42,360	
September 15	3:00 p.m.	Idaho State	**California**	California Memorial Stadium • Berkeley, CA	P12N	**W** 45–23	37,104	
September 15	4:00 p.m.	**Oregon State**	Nevada	Mackay Stadium • Reno, NV	ESPNU	**L** 35–37	20,462	
September 15	5:00 p.m.	Eastern Washington	**Washington State**	Martin Stadium • Pullman, WA	P12N	**W** 59–24	32,952	
September 15	5:00 p.m.	No. 22 **USC**	Texas	Darrell K Royal–Texas Memorial Stadium • Austin, TX	FOX	**L** 14–37	103,507	
September 15	7:00 p.m.	No. 10 **Washington**	**Utah**	Rice–Eccles Stadium • Salt Lake City, UT	ESPN	**WASH** 21–7	47,445	
September 15	7:30 p.m.	No. 23 **Arizona State**	San Diego State	SDCCU Stadium • San Diego, CA	CBSSN	**L** 21–28	34,641	
September 15	7:30 p.m.	Fresno State	**UCLA**	Rose Bowl • Pasadena, CA	FS1	**L** 14–38	60,867	
September 15	8:00 p.m.	Southern Utah	**Arizona**	Arizona Stadium • Tucson, AZ	P12N	**W** 62–31	41,493	
^{#}Rankings from AP Poll released prior to game. All times are in Pacific Time.

==== Week 4 ====
Date	Time	Visiting team	Home team	Site	TV	Result	Attendance	Ref.
September 21	7:30 p.m.	**Washington State**	**USC**	LA Memorial Coliseum • Los Angeles, CA	ESPN	**USC** 39–36	52,421	
September 22	1:00 p.m.	**Arizona**	**Oregon State**	Reser Stadium • Corvallis, OR	P12N	**ARZ** 35–14	33,022	
September 22	5:00 p.m.	No. 7 **Stanford**	No. 20 **Oregon**	Autzen Stadium • Eugene, OR	ABC	**STAN** 38–31 ^{OT}	58,453	
September 22	7:30 p.m.	**Arizona State**	No. 10 **Washington**	Husky Stadium • Seattle, WA	ESPN	**WASH** 27–20	71,200	
^{#}Rankings from AP Poll released prior to game. All times are in Pacific Time.

Date	Bye Week			
September 22	California	Colorado	UCLA	Utah

==== Week 5 ====
Date	Time	Visiting team	Home team	Site	TV	Result	Attendance	Ref.
September 28	6:00 p.m.	**UCLA**	**Colorado**	Folsom Field • Boulder, CO	FS1	**COLO** 38–16	46,814	
September 29	3:30 p.m.	**Utah**	**Washington State**	Martin Stadium • Pullman, WA	P12N	**WSU** 28–24	30,088	
September 29	4:30 p.m.	No. 7 **Stanford**	No. 8 Notre Dame	Notre Dame Stadium • South Bend, IN (Legends Trophy)	NBC	**L** 17–38	77,622	
September 29	5:30 p.m.	No. 20 BYU	No. 11 **Washington**	Husky Stadium • Seattle, WA	FOX	**W** 35–7	70,155	
September 29	7:00 p.m.	**Oregon State**	**Arizona State**	Sun Devil Stadium • Tempe, AZ	P12N	**ASU** 52–24	51,447	
September 29	7:30 p.m.	**USC**	**Arizona**	Arizona Stadium • Tucson, AZ	ESPN2	**USC** 24–20	43,573	
September 29	7:30 p.m.	No. 19 **Oregon**	No. 24 **California**	California Memorial Stadium • Berkeley, CA	FS1	**ORE** 42–24	43,448	
^{#}Rankings from AP Poll released prior to game. All times are in Pacific Time.

==== Week 6 ====
Date	Time	Visiting team	Home team	Site	TV	Result	Attendance	Ref.
October 6	1:00 p.m.	**Arizona State**	No. 21 **Colorado**	Folsom Field • Boulder, CO	P12N	**COLO** 28–21	52,681	
October 6	4:30 p.m.	No. 10 **Washington**	**UCLA**	Rose Bowl • Pasadena, CA	FOX	**WASH** 31–24	51,123	
October 6	6:00 p.m.	**Washington State**	**Oregon State**	Reeser Stadium • Corvallis, OR	P12N	**WSU** 56–37	34,429	
October 6	7:00 p.m.	**California**	**Arizona**	Arizona Stadium • Tucson, AZ	FS1	**ARZ** 24–17	44,253	
October 6	7:30 p.m.	**Utah**	No. 14 **Stanford**	Stanford Stadium • Stanford, CA	ESPN	**UTAH** 40–21	37,244	
^{#}Rankings from AP Poll released prior to game. All times are in Pacific Time.

Date	Bye Week	
October 6	Oregon	USC

==== Week 7 ====
Date	Time	Visiting team	Home team	Site	TV	Result	Attendance	Ref.
October 12	7:00 p.m.	**Arizona**	**Utah**	Rice–Eccles Stadium • Salt Lake City, UT	ESPN	**UTAH** 42–10	45,862	
October 13	12:30 p.m.	No. 7 **Washington**	No. 17 **Oregon**	Autzen Stadium • Eugene, OR	ABC/ESPN2	**ORE** 30–27 ^{OT}	58,691	
October 13	4:00 p.m.	**UCLA**	**California**	California Memorial Stadium • Berkeley, CA (California–UCLA rivalry)	P12N	**UCLA** 37–7	45,889	
October 13	7:30 p.m.	No. 19 **Colorado**	**USC**	LA Memorial Coliseum • Los Angeles, CA	FS1	**USC** 31–20	78,467	
^{#}Rankings from AP Poll released prior to game. All times are in Pacific Time.

Date	Bye Week			
October 13	Arizona State	Oregon State	Stanford	Washington State

==== Week 8 ====
Date	Time	Visiting team	Home team	Site	TV	Result	Attendance	Ref.
October 18	6:00 p.m.	**Stanford**	**Arizona State**	Sun Devil Stadium • Tempe, AZ	ESPN	**STAN** 20–13	42,946	
October 20	12:30 p.m.	**Colorado**	No. 15 **Washington**	Husky Stadium • Seattle, WA	FOX	**WASH** 27–13	68,798	
October 20	1:00 p.m.	**California**	**Oregon State**	Reeser Stadium • Corvallis, OR	P12N	**CAL** 49–7	32,390	
October 20	4:30 p.m.	No. 12 **Oregon**	No. 25 **Washington State**	Martin Stadium • Pullman, WA	FOX	**WSU** 34–20	33,152	
October 20	5:00 p.m.	**USC**	**Utah**	Rice–Eccles Stadium • Salt Lake City, UT	P12N	**UTAH** 41–28	46,405	
October 20	7:30 p.m.	**Arizona**	**UCLA**	Rose Bowl • Pasadena, CA	ESPN2	**UCLA** 31–30	54,686	
^{#}Rankings from AP Poll released prior to game. All times are in Pacific Time.

==== Week 9 ====
Date	Time	Visiting team	Home team	Site	TV	Result	Attendance	Ref.
October 26	7:30 p.m.	No. 23 **Utah**	**UCLA**	Rose Bowl • Pasadena, CA	ESPN	**UTAH** 41–10	41,848	
October 27	12:00 p.m.	**Oregon State**	**Colorado**	Folsom Field • Boulder, CO	P12N	**OSU** 41–34 ^{OT}	48,050	
October 27	12:30 p.m.	**Arizona State**	**USC**	LA Memorial Coliseum • Los Angeles, CA	ABC/ESPN2	**ASU** 38–35	47,406	
October 27	3:30 p.m.	No. 15 **Washington**	**California**	California Memorial Stadium • Berkeley, CA	FS1	**CAL** 12–10	39,138	
October 27	4:00 p.m.	No. 14 **Washington State**	No. 24 **Stanford**	Stanford Stadium • Stanford, CA	P12N	**WSU** 41–38	39,596	
October 27	7:30 p.m.	No. 19 **Oregon**	**Arizona**	Arizona Stadium • Tucson, AZ	ESPN	**ARZ** 44–15	42,845	
^{#}Rankings from AP Poll released prior to game. All times are in Pacific Time.

==== Week 10 ====
Date	Time	Visiting team	Home team	Site	TV	Result	Attendance	Ref.
November 2	7:45 p.m.	**Colorado**	**Arizona**	Arizona Stadium • Tucson, AZ	FS1	**ARZ** 42–34	43,080	
November 3	1:00 p.m.	No. 16 **Utah**	**Arizona State**	Sun Devil Stadium • Tempe, AZ	P12N	**ASU** 38–20	46,445	
November 3	4:30 p.m.	**UCLA**	**Oregon**	Autzen Stadium • Eugene, OR	FOX	**ORE** 42–21	56,114	
November 3	6:00 p.m.	**Stanford**	**Washington**	Husky Stadium • Seattle, WA	P12N	**WASH** 27–23	69,690	
November 3	7:00 p.m.	**USC**	**Oregon State**	Reeser Stadium • Corvallis, OR	FS1	**USC** 38–21	35,187	
November 3	7:45 p.m.	**California**	No. 10 **Washington State**	Martin Stadium • Pullman, WA	ESPN	**WSU** 19–13	32,952	
^{#}Rankings from AP Poll released prior to game. All times are in Pacific Time.

==== Week 11 ====
Date	Time	Visiting team	Home team	Site	TV	Result	Attendance	Ref.
November 10	11:00 a.m.	**UCLA**	**Arizona State**	Sun Devil Stadium • Tempe, AZ	P12N	**ASU** 31–28	46,466	
November 10	12:30 p.m.	No. 10 **Washington State**	**Colorado**	Folsom Field • Boulder, CO	ESPN	**WSU** 31–7	45,587	
November 10	2:30 p.m.	**Oregon**	**Utah**	Rice–Eccles Stadium • Salt Lake City, UT	P12N	**UTAH** 32–25	46,275	
November 10	6:00 p.m.	**Oregon State**	**Stanford**	Stanford Stadium • Stanford, CA	P12N	**STAN** 48–17	34,671	
November 10	7:30 p.m.	**California**	**USC**	LA Memorial Coliseum • Los Angeles, CA	ESPN	**CAL** 15–14	56,721	
^{#}Rankings from AP Poll released prior to game. All times are in Pacific Time.

Date	Bye Week	
November 10	Arizona	No. 20 Washington

==== Week 12 ====
Date	Time	Visiting team	Home team	Site	TV	Result	Attendance	Ref.
November 17	10:30 a.m.	No. 21 **Utah**	**Colorado**	Folsom Field • Boulder, CO (Rumble in the Rockies)	P12N	**UTAH** 30–7	39,360	
November 17	12:30 p.m.	**USC**	**UCLA**	Rose Bowl • Pasadena, CA (Victory Bell)	FOX	**UCLA** 34–27	57,116	
November 17	1:30 p.m.	**Oregon State**	No. 17 **Washington**	Husky Stadium • Seattle, WA	P12N	**WASH** 42–23	66,469	
November 17	7:30 p.m.	**Arizona**	No. 8 **Washington State**	Martin Stadium • Pullman, WA	ESPN	**WSU** 69–28	22,400	
November 17	7:30 p.m.	**Arizona State**	**Oregon**	Autzen Stadium • Eugene, OR	P12N	**ORE** 31–29	50,485	
^{#}Rankings from AP Poll released prior to game. All times are in Pacific Time.

==== Week 13 ====
Date	Time	Visiting team	Home team	Site	TV	Result	Attendance	Ref.
November 23	1:00 p.m.	**Oregon**	**Oregon State**	Reser Stadium • Corvallis, OR (Civil War)	FS1	**ORE** 55–15	39,776	
November 23	5:30 p.m.	No. 16 **Washington**	No. 7 **Washington State**	Martin Stadium • Pullman, WA (Apple Cup)	FOX	**WASH** 28–15	32,952	
November 24	12:00 p.m.	**Stanford**	**UCLA**	Rose Bowl • Pasadena, CA	P12N	**STAN** 49–42	38,391	
November 24	12:30 p.m.	**Arizona State**	**Arizona**	Arizona Stadium • Tucson, AZ (Territorial Cup)	FS1	**UA** 41–40	51,805	
November 24	4:00 p.m.	**Colorado**	**California**	California Memorial Stadium • Berkeley, CA	P12N	**CAL** 33–21	34,457	
November 24	5:00 p.m.	Notre Dame	**USC**	LA Memorial Coliseum • Los Angeles, CA (Jeweled Shillelagh)	ABC	**L** 17–24	59,821	
November 24	7:00 p.m.	BYU	No. 18 **Utah**	Rice–Eccles Stadium • Salt Lake City, UT (Holy War)	FS1	**W** 35–27	46,017	
^{#}Rankings from AP Poll released prior to game. All times are in Pacific Time.

==== Week 14 ====
The Stanford–California football game was moved from November 17 to December 1 due to poor air quality from wildfires in the Bay Area.

Date	Time	Visiting team	Home team	Site	TV	Result	Attendance	Ref.
December 1	12:00 p.m.	**Stanford**	**California**	California Memorial Stadium • Berkeley, CA (121st Big Game/Stanford Axe)	P12N	**STAN** 23–13	57,858	
^{#}Rankings from AP Poll released prior to game. All times are in Pacific Time.

=== Pac-12 Championship Game ===
The championship game was played on Friday November 30, 2018. It featured the teams with the best conference records from each division, the North (Washington) and the South (Utah). This was the eighth championship game.

Date	Time	Visiting team	Home team	Site	TV	Result	Attendance	Ref.
November 30	5:00 p.m.	No. 17 **Utah**	No. 10 **Washington**	Levi's Stadium • Santa Clara, CA	FOX	**WASH** 10–3	35,134	
^{#}Rankings from AP Poll released prior to game. All times are in Pacific Time.

== Pac-12 vs other conferences ==
=== Pac-12 vs Power Five matchups ===
This is a list of the power conference teams (ACC, Big 10, Big 12, Notre Dame and SEC) that the Pac-12 plays in the non-conference games. Although the NCAA does not consider BYU a "Power Five" school, the Pac-12 considers games against BYU as satisfying its "Power Five" scheduling requirement. All rankings are from the AP Poll at the time of the game.

Date	Visitor	Home	Site	Significance	Score
September 1	BYU	Arizona	Arizona Stadium • Tucson, Arizona		L 14–48
September 1	Oregon State	No. 5 Ohio State	Ohio Stadium • Columbus, Ohio		L 31–77
September 1	No. 6 Washington	No. 9 Auburn	Mercedes-Benz Stadium • Atlanta		L 16–21
September 1	North Carolina	California	California Memorial Stadium • Berkeley, California		W 24–17
September 8	No. 15 Michigan State	Arizona State	Sun Devil Stadium • Tempe, Arizona		W 16–13
September 8	UCLA	No. 6 Oklahoma	Gaylord Family Oklahoma Memorial Stadium • Norman, Oklahoma		L 21–49
September 8	Colorado	Nebraska	Memorial Stadium • Lincoln, Nebraska	Colorado–Nebraska football rivalry	W 33–28
September 8	California	BYU	LaVell Edwards Stadium • Provo, Utah		W 21–18
September 15	No. 22 USC	Texas	Darrell K Royal–Texas Memorial Stadium • Austin, Texas		L 14–37
September 29	No. 20 BYU	No. 11 Washington	Husky Stadium • Seattle		W 35–7
September 29	No. 7 Stanford	No. 8 Notre Dame	Notre Dame Stadium • South Bend, Indiana	Legends Trophy	L 17–38
November 24	BYU	No. 18 Utah	Rice-Eccles Stadium • Salt Lake City	Holy War	W 35–27
November 24	Notre Dame	USC	LA Memorial Coliseum • Los Angeles	Jeweled Shillelagh	L 17–24

=== Records against other conferences ===
2018 records against non-conference foes as of November 26, 2018:

Regular Season

Power 5 Conferences	Record
ACC	1–0
Big Ten	2–1
Big 12	0–2
BYU/Notre Dame	3–3
SEC	0–1
Power 5 Total	6–7
Other FBS Conferences	Record
American	0–2
C-USA	1–0
Independents (Excluding BYU and Notre Dame)	0–0
MAC	2–0
Mountain West	6–3
Sun Belt	0–0
Other FBS Total	9–5
FCS Opponents	Record
Football Championship Subdivision	9–0
Total Non-Conference Record	24–12

Post Season

Power Conferences 5	Record
ACC	1–0
Big Ten	1–2
Big 12	1–1
Power 5 Total	3–3
Other FBS Conferences	Record
Mountain West	0–1
Other FBS Total	0–1
Total Bowl Record	3–4

== Postseason ==
=== Bowl games ===
Legend
Pac-12 win
Pac-12 loss

Bowl game	Date	Site	Television	Time (PST)	Pac-12 team	Opponent	Score	Attendance
Las Vegas Bowl	December 15	Sam Boyd Stadium • Las Vegas, NV	ABC	12:30 p.m.	Arizona State	No. 19 Fresno State	20–31	37,146
Cheez-It Bowl	December 26	Chase Field • Phoenix, AZ	ESPN	6:00 p.m.	California	TCU	7–10	33,121
Alamo Bowl	December 28	Alamodome • San Antonio, TX	ESPN	6:00 p.m.	No. 12 Washington State	No. 25 Iowa State	28–26	60,675
Sun Bowl	December 31	Sun Bowl • El Paso, TX	CBS	11:00 a.m.	Stanford	Pittsburgh	14–13	40,680
Redbox Bowl	December 31	Levi's Stadium • Santa Clara, CA	FOX	12:00 p.m.	Oregon	Michigan State	7–6	30,212
Holiday Bowl	December 31	SDCCU Stadium • San Diego, CA	FS1	4:00 p.m.	No. 20 Utah	Northwestern	20–31	47,007
New Year's Six Bowl
Rose Bowl	January 1	Rose Bowl • Pasadena, CA	ESPN	2:00 p.m.	No. 9 Washington	No. 5 Ohio State	23–28	91,853

Rankings are from AP Poll. All times Pacific Time Zone.

Selection of teams:

- Bowl-eligible: Arizona State, California, Oregon, Stanford, Utah, Washington, Washington State
- Bowl-ineligible: Arizona, Colorado, Oregon State, UCLA, USC

== Awards and honors ==
=== Player of the week honors ===
Following each week's games, Pac-12 conference officials select the players of the week from the conference's teams.

Week	Offensive			Defensive			Special teams		
Week	Player	Position	Team	Player	Position	Team	Player	Position	Team
Week 1 (Sept. 4)	J. J. Arcega-Whiteside	WR	Stanford	Nate Landman	ILB	Colorado	Chase McGrath	PK	USC
Week 2 (Sept. 10)	Laviska Shenault	WR	Colorado	Chase Hansen	LB	Utah	Brandon Ruiz	PK	Arizona State
Week 3 (Sept. 17)	Gardner Minshew	QB	Washington State	Ben Burr-Kirven	LB	Washington	Travell Harris	WR/KR	Washington State
Week 4 (Sept. 24)	J. J. Taylor	RB	Arizona	Ben Burr-Kirven	LB	Washington	Jay Tufele	DL	USC
Week 5 (Oct. 1)	Eno Benjamin	RB	Arizona State	Ugo Amadi	S	Oregon	Marvell Tell	S	USC
Week 6 (Oct. 8)	Laviska Shenault	WR	Colorado	Jaylon Johnson	DB	Utah	Matt Gay	K	Utah
Week 7 (Oct. 15)	C. J. Verdell	RB	Oregon	Keisean Lucier-South	LB	UCLA	Mitch Wishnowsky	P	Utah
Week 8 (Oct. 22)	Tyler Huntley	QB	Utah	Chase Hansen	LB	Utah	Matt Gay	PK	Utah
Week 9 (Oct. 29)	Jake Luton	QB	Oregon State	Evan Weaver	LB	California	N'Keal Harry	WR	Arizona State
Week 10 (Nov. 4)	N'Keal Harry	WR	Arizona State	Merlin Robertson	LB	Arizona State	Ugochukwu Amadi	S	Oregon
Week 11 (Nov. 10)	Colby Parkinson	TE	Stanford	Luc Bequette	DE	California	Matt Gay	PK	Utah
Week 12 (Nov. 19)	Joshua Kelley	RB	UCLA	Jahad Woods	LB	Washington State	Matt Gay	PK	Utah
Week 13 (Nov. 26)	Myles Gaskin	RB	Washington	Ashtyn Davis	S	California	Steven Coutts	P	California

=== All-conference teams ===
The following players earned All-Pac-12 honors. Any teams showing (_) following their name are indicating the number of All-Pac-12 Conference Honors awarded to that university for 1st team and 2nd team respectively. Utah leads the Pac-12 with 9 First team and 4 Second team, followed by Washington with 5 First team and 3 Second team, Stanford at 2 First team and 6 Second team, Oregon at 2 First team and 3 Second team, Washington Stateand Arizona State both with 2 First team and 2 Second team, UCLA with 1 First team and 1 Second team, Arizona, Colorado and California all with 1 First team, USC with 5 Second team, and Oregon State receiving none for either team.

First-team

Position	Player	Class	Team
First Team Offense
QB	Gardner Minshew	Sr.	Washington State
RB	Eno Benjamin	So.	Arizona State
RB	J. J. Taylor	RSo.	Arizona
WR	N'Keal Harry	Jr.	Arizona State (2)
WR	Laviska Shenault	So.	Colorado
TE	Caleb Wilson	RJr.	UCLA
OL	Jordan Agasiva	Sr.	Utah
OL	Jackson Barton	Sr.	Utah (2)
OL	Andre Dillard	RSr.	Washington State (2)
OL	Nick Harris	Jr.	Washington
OL	Walker Little	So.	Stanford
OL	Kaleb McGary	RSr.	Washington (2)
First Team Defense
DL	Bradlee Anae	Jr.	Utah (3)
DL	Leki Fotu	Jr.	Utah (4)
DL	Greg Gaines	RSr.	Washington (2)
DL	Jalen Jelks	Sr.	Oregon
LB	Ben Burr-Kirven	Sr.	Washington (3)
LB	Chase Hansen	Sr.	Utah (5)
LB	Jordan Kunaszyk	RSr.	California
DB	Paulson Adebo	RFr.	Stanford (2)
DB	Jaylon Johnson	So.	Utah (6)
DB	Byron Murphy	RSo.	Washington (4)
DB	Taylor Rapp	RJr.	Washington (5)
First Team Special Teams
PK	Matt Gay	Sr.	Utah (7)
P	Mitch Wishnowsky	Sr.	Utah (8)
RT	Britain Covey	So.	Utah (9)
ST	Brenden Schooler	Jr.	Oregon (2)

Second-team

Position	Player	Class	Team
Second Team Offense
QB	K. J. Costello	Jr.	Stanford
RB	Myles Gaskin	Sr.	Washington
RB	Zack Moss	Jr.	Utah
WR	J. J. Arcega-Whiteside	Sr.	Stanford (2)
WR	Dillon Mitchell	Jr.	Oregon
TE	Kaden Smith	Jr.	Stanford (3)
OL	Cohl Cabral	Jr.	Arizona State
OL	Chuma Edoga	Sr.	USC
OL	Nate Herbig	Jr.	Stanford (4)
OL	Shane Lemieux	Jr.	Oregon (2)
OL	Abraham Lucas	RFr.	Washington State
Second Team Defense
DL	Porter Gustin	Sr.	USC (2)
DL	John Penisini	Jr.	Utah (2)
DL	Logan Tago	Sr.	Washington State (2)
DL	Jay Tufele	RFr.	USC (3)
LB	Troy Dye	Jr.	Oregon (3)
LB	Cameron Smith	Sr.	USC (4)
LB	Evan Weaver	Jr.	California
DB	Julian Blackmon	Jr.	Utah (3)
DB	Marquise Blair	Sr.	Utah (4)
DB	Myles Bryant	Jr.	Washington (2)
DB	Iman Marshall	Sr.	USC (5)
DB	Adarius Pickett	RSr.	UCLA
Second Team Special Teams
PK	Jet Toner	Jr.	Stanford (5)
P	Jake Bailey	Sr.	Stanford (6)
RT	N'Keal Harry	Jr.	Arizona State (2)
ST	Elijah Molden	So.	Washington (3)

Honorable mentions

- ARIZONA: DL P. J. Johnson, RJr.; WR Shawn Poindexter Sr.; Thomas Reid III, WR, RSo.; LB Colin Schooler, So.
- ARIZONA STATE: OL Quinn Bailey, RSr.; DB Aashari Crosswell, Fr.; OL Casey Tucker, Grad.; DL Renell Wren, RSr.
- CALIFORNIA: DE Luc Bequette, RJr.; DB Camryn Bynum, RSo.; P Steven Coutts, RJr.; RS Ashtyn Davis, RJr.
- COLORADO: LB Rick Gamboa Sr.; DL Mustafa Johnson, So.; LB Nate Landman, So.; RB Travon McMillian, Sr.; OL Will Sherman, Fr.; DB Evan Worthington, Sr.
- OREGON: DB Ugo Amadi, Sr.; OL Jake Hanson, Jr.; OLB Justin Hollins, Sr.; DL Jordon Scott, So.; OL Penei Sewell, Fr.; OL Calvin Throckmorton, Jr.
- OREGON STATE: AP/ST Andre Bodden, RJr.; WR Trevon Bradford Jr.; WR Isaiah Hodgins, So.; RB Jermar Jefferson, Fr.
- STANFORD: DB Alijah Holder, RSr.; RB Bryce Love, Sr.; LB Bobby Okereke, Sr.; TE Colby Parkinson, So.; DL Jovon Swann Jr.
- UCLA: P Stefan Flintoft, RSr.; DB Darnay Holmes, So.; WR Theo Howard Jr.; RB Joshua Kelley, RJr.; PK JJ Molson Jr.
- USC: DB Ajene Harris Sr.; OL Toa Lobendahn, RSr.; WR Michael Pittman Jr., Jr.; DB Marvell Tell, Sr.; RS Tyler Vaughns, RSo.
- UTAH: DB Corrion Ballard Sr.; LB Cody Barton, Sr.; OL Lo Falemaka Sr.; DB Javelin Guidry, So.
- WASHINGTON: QB Jake Browning, Sr.; DL Jaylen Johnson Sr.; DB Jojo McIntosh Sr.; TE Drew Sample, RSr.
- WASHINGTON STATE: P Oscar Draguicevich, RSo.; RS Travell Harris, RFr.; OL Frederick Mauigoa Jr.; LB Peyton Pelluer, Grad.; DB Jalen Thompson, Jr.; RB James Williams, RJr.; AP/ST Kainoa Wilson, RJr.; LB Jahad Woods, RSo

=== Pac-12 individual awards ===
The following individuals won the Pac-12 conference's annual player and coach awards:

Pac-12 Offensive Player of the Year

QB Gardner Minshew, Washington State

Pac-12 Defensive Player of the Year

LB Ben Burr-Kirven, Washington

Pac-12 Coach of the Year

Mike Leach, Washington State

Pac-12 Offensive Freshman Player of the Year

RB Jermar Jefferson, Oregon State

Pac-12 Defensive Freshman Player of the Year

LB Merlin Robertson, Arizona State

Pac-12 Scholar Athlete Player of the Year

LB Ben Burr-Kirven, Washington

=== All-Americans ===
The following Pac-12 players were named to the 2018 College Football All-America Team by the Walter Camp Football Foundation (WCFF), Associated Press (AP), Football Writers Association of America (FWAA), Sporting News (SN), and American Football Coaches Association (AFCA):

Academic All-America Team Member of the Year (CoSIDA):

=== All-Academic ===
First team

Pos.	Name	School	Yr.	GPA	Major
QB	Justin Herbert	Oregon	RSJr.	4.06	Biology
RB	Patrick Laird	California	RSSr.	3.58	Business Administration; Political Science
RB	Nick Ralston	Arizona State	RSJr.	4.00	MBA & Finance (Graduate School)
WR	Britain Covey	Utah	Sophomore	3.85	Business
WR	Timmy Hernandez	Oregon State	Senior	3.66	Mechanical Engineering
TE	Bryce Wolma	Arizona	Sophomore	4.00	Pre-Business
OL	Brian Chaffin	Stanford	Senior	3.65	Science, Technology and Society
OL	Drew Dalman	Stanford	Sophomore	3.65	Undeclared
OL	Michael Saffell	California	Sophomore	3.54	Undeclared
OL	Calvin Throckmorton	Oregon	RSJr.	3.84	Human Physiology
OL	Nick Wilson	Stanford	Senior	3.623	Mechanical Engineering
DL	Taylor Comfort	Washington State	RSSr.	3.33	Criminal Justice and Psychology
DL	Nick Heninger	Utah	RSSo.	3.73	Business Administration
DL	Dylan Jackson	Stanford	Senior	3.30	Political Science
DL	Levi Onwuzurike	Washington	RSo.	3.36	Pre-Major (Arts & Science)
LB	Tevis Bartlett	Washington	Senior	3.70	Education, Community & Organizations
LB	Ben Burr-Kirven	Washington	Junior	3.69	Comparative Literature (Cinema Studies)
LB	Casey Toohill	Stanford	Senior	3.67	Political Science
DB	Jaylon Johnson	Utah	Sophomore	3.62	Business
DB	Elijah Molden	Washington	Sophomore	3.66	Pre-Major (Arts & Science)
DB	Taylor Rapp	Washington	Sophomore	3.61	Business Administration (Finance)
DB	Noah Williams	Stanford	Sophomore	3.84	Undeclared
PK	Josh Pollack	Arizona	Graduate	3.67	Accounting
P	Steven Coutts	California	RSJr.	3.62	Education (Master's)
ST	Richard McNitzky	Stanford	Junior	3.872	Political Science

Second team

Pos.	Name	School	Yr.	GPA	Major
QB	Rhett Rodriguez	Arizona	Sophomore	4.00	Pre-Business
RB	Salvon Ahmed	Washington	Sophomore	3.39	Pre-Social Science
RB	Clay Markoff	Washington	RSSo.	3.76	Undeclared
WR	John Gardner	Washington	Senior	3.55	Economics
WR	Kyle Williams	Arizona State	Junior	3.50	Biomedical Engineering
TE	Drew Sample	Washington	Senior	3.40	Communication
OL	Jesse Burkett	Stanford	Graduate	3.49	Japanese; Symbolic Systems
OL	Jake Curhan	California	RSSo.	3.41	Undeclared
OL	Devery Hamilton	Stanford	Junior	3.41	Undeclared
OL	Jaxson Kirkland	Washington	RSFr.	3.42	Pre-Social Science
OL	Dylan Powell	Stanford	Junior	3.50	Communication
DL	Gary Baker	Oregon	RSJr.	3.23	General Social Science
DL	Nick Begg	Washington State	RSSr.	3.20	Public Relations
DL	Karson Block	Washington State	RSJr.	3.21	Social Sciences
DL	Greg Gaines	Washington	Senior	3.23	Communication
LB	Sean Barton	Stanford	Senior	3.48	International Relations
LB	Odua Isibor	UCLA	RSFr.	3.48	Undeclared
LB	Peyton Pelluer	Washington State	RSSr.	3.48	Masters in Teaching
DB	Frank Buncom	Stanford	Junior	3.29	Human Biology
DB	Terrell Burgess	Utah	Junior	3.19	Kinesiology
DB	Quentin Lake	UCLA	Sophomore	3.39	Undeclared
DB	Chacho Ulloa	Arizona	Junior	3.43	Accounting
PK	Jet Toner	Stanford	Junior	3.57	Science, Technology and Society
P	Mitch Wishnowsky	Utah	Senior	3.53	Kinesiology and Physical Education Teaching
ST	Connor Haller	Utah	Sophomore	3.73	Pre-Business

Honorable mentions: ARIZ: Cody Creason, Jake Glatting, Jamie Nunley; ASU: Eno Benjamin, Cody French, Jordan Hoyt, Malik Lawal, Josh Pokraka, John Riley, Brandon Ruiz, Michael Sleep-Dalton; CAL: Siulagisipai Fuimaono, Chase Garbers, Ryan Gibson, Chris Landgrebe, Malik McMorris, Chinedu Udeogu, Ricky Walker III; COLO: Lucas Cooper, Josh Goldin, Aaron Haigler, Tim Lynott, Nico Magri, Davis Price, Colby Pursell, Carson Wells; ORE: Brady Aiello, Kaulana Apelu, Jake Breeland, Brady Breeze, Braxton Burmeister, Jacob Capra, Drayton Carlberg, Jake Hanson, Hunter Kampmoyer, Shane Lemieux, Blake Maimone, Sampson Niu; OSU: B. J. Baylor, Conor Blount, Andre Bodden, Blake Brandel, Jordan Choukair, Isaiah Dunn, Keegan Firth, Champ Flemings, Andrzej Hughes-Murray, Isaiah Hodgins, Sumner Houston, Drew Kell, Connor Kelsey, Luke Leonnig, Jeffrey Manning Jr., Trent Moore, Mason Moran, Artavis Pierce, Daniel Rodriguez, Kolby Taylor, Moku Watson; STAN: Joey Alfieri, Malik Antoine, Jake Bailey, Treyjohn Butler, K. J. Costello, Obi Eboh, Tucker Fisk, Jordan Fox, Scooter Harrington, Henry Hattis, Nate Herbig, Stuart Head, Houston Heimuli, Alijah Holder, Trenton Irwin, Thunder Keck, Walker Little, Bryce Love, Alameen Murphy, Colby Parkinson, Andrew Pryts, Gabe Reid, Cameron Scarlett, Kaden Smith, Trevor Speights, Jovan Swann, Dayln Wade-Perry, Reagan Williams; UCLA: Michael Alves, Johnny Den Bleyker, Ethan Fernea, Stefan Flintoft, Dymond Lee, Christian Pabico, Adarius Pickett, Shea Pitts, Jay Shaw, Jayce Smalley, Caleb Wilson; USC: Jordan Austin, Reid Budrovich, Erik Krommenhoek, Wyatt Schmidt; UTAH: Jordan Agasiva, Marquise Blair, Nick Ford, Javelin Guidry, Tyler Huntley, Jake Jackson, Josh Nurse, Darrin Paulo, John Penisini, Hauati Pututau, Jason Shelley, Demari Simpkins, Mika Tafua, Mason Woodward; WASH: Andre Baccellia, Jake Browning, A.J. Carty, Nick Harris, Peyton Henry, Jared Hilbers, Ty Jones, Jordan Miller, Cade Otton, Race Porter, Henry Roberts, Joe Tryon-Shoyinka, Jusstis Warren, Joel Whitford; WSU: Brandon Arconado, Tristan Brock, Jack Crane, Cole Dubots, Travell Harris, Liam Ryan, Trey Tinsley.

== Home game attendance ==
Team	Stadium	Capacity	Game 1	Game 2	Game 3	Game 4	Game 5	Game 6	Game 7	Total	Average	% of Capacity
Arizona	Arizona Stadium	55,675	51,002	41,493	43,573	44,253	42,845	43,080	51,805†	318,051	45,436	81.61%
Arizona State	Sun Devil Stadium	57,078	50,188	53,599†	51,447	42,946	46,445	46,466	—	291,091	48,515	85.00%
California	California Memorial Stadium	62,467	42,168	37,104	43,448	45,889	39,138	34,457	57,858†	300,062	42,866	68.62%
Colorado	Folsom Field	50,183	42,360	46,814	**52,681†**	48,050	45,587	39,360	—	274,852	45,809	91.28%
Oregon	Autzen Stadium	54,000	50,112	47,210	50,049	**58,453**	**58,691†**	**56,114**	50,485	371,114	53,016	98.18%
Oregon State	Reser Stadium	43,363	36,448	33,022	34,429	32,390	35,187	39,776	—	211,252	35,209	81.20%
Stanford	Stanford Stadium	50,424	40,913	42,856†	31,772	37,244	39,596	34,671	—	227,052	37,842	75.05%
UCLA	Rose Bowl	92,542	54,116	60,867†	51,123	54,686	41,848	57,116	38,391	358,147	51,164	55.29%
USC	Los Angeles Memorial Coliseum	93,607	58,708	52,421	78,467†	47,406	56,721	59,821	—	353,544	58,924	62.95%
Utah	Rice-Eccles Stadium	45,807	**45,988**	**47,445†**	**45,862**	**46,405**	**46,275**	**46,017**	—	277,992	**46,332**	101.15%
Washington	Husky Stadium	70,083	68,093	**71,200†**	**70,155**	68,798	69,690	66,469	—	414,405	69,068	98.55%
Washington State	Martin Stadium	32,952	26,141	**32,952**	30,088	**33,152†**	**32,952**	22,400	**32,952**	210,637	30,091	91.31%

Bold – Exceed capacity
†Season High
