= Mitch Wishnowsky =

Australian gridiron football player (born 1992)

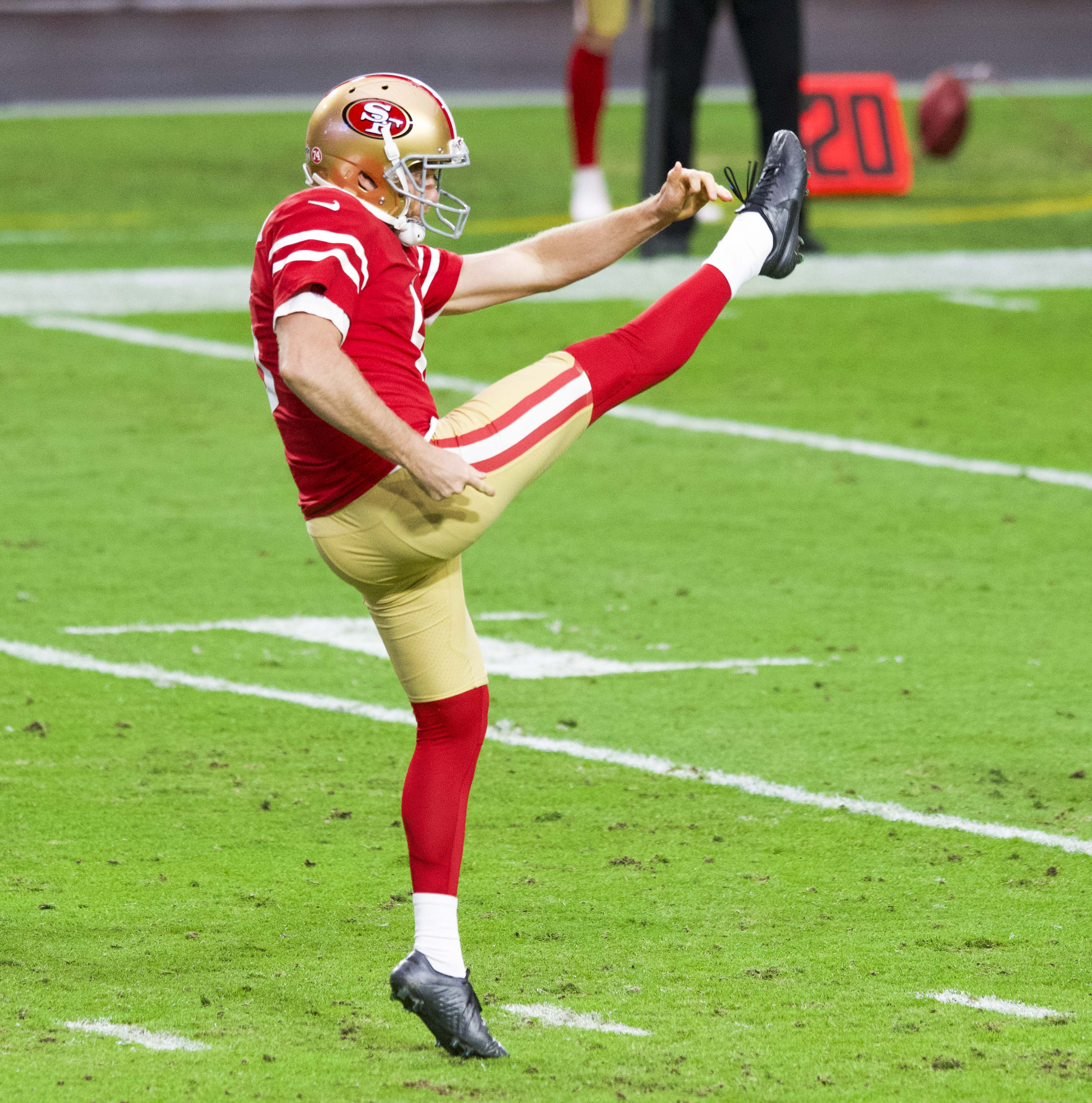
- Wishnowsky with the San Francisco 49ers in 2020

No. 19 – New England Patriots
- Position: Punter
- Roster status: Active

Personal information
- Born: 3 March 1992 (age 34); Gosnells, Western Australia, Australia
- Listed height: 6 ft 2 in (1.88 m)
- Listed weight: 220 lb (100 kg)

Career information
- High school: Lumen Christi (Martin, Western Australia)
- College: Santa Barbara City (2014–2015); Utah (2016–2018)
- NFL draft: 2019: 4th round, 110th overall pick

Career history
- San Francisco 49ers (2019–2024); Washington Commanders (2025)*; Buffalo Bills (2025); New England Patriots (2026–present)
- * Offseason or practice squad member only

Awards and highlights
- Ray Guy Award (2016); Unanimous All-American (2016); 2× second-team All-American (2017, 2018); 3× first-team All-Pac-12 (2016–2018)

Career NFL statistics as of Week 7, 2026
- Punts: 370
- Punting yards: 16,902
- Punting average: 45.7
- Longest punt: 74
- Inside 20: 166
- Points scored: 5
- Stats at Pro Football Reference

Mitchell Wishnowsky (born 3 March 1992) is an Australian professional American football punter and kickoff specialist for the New England Patriots of the National Football League (NFL). He played college football for the Santa Barbara City Vaqueros and Utah Utes, where he won the Ray Guy Award and was a unanimous All-American in 2016. Wishnowsky was selected by the San Francisco 49ers in the fourth round of the 2019 NFL draft.

== Early life ==
Wishnowsky was born on 3 March 1992 in Gosnells, Western Australia, a suburb of Perth. He was a student of Lumen Christi College from 2005 to 2009. He grew up playing Australian rules football, but was forced to give up the sport at age 18 due to repeated shoulder injuries. He played for Perth in the WAFL Reserves. By that time, he had dropped out of secondary school at age 16 to become a glazier.

Although no longer playing full-contact Australian rules, he continued to play a flag version of the sport alongside several friends, one of whom had a connection to Prokick Australia, a training centre in Melbourne that converts Australian rules players into gridiron football punters. He left his job and moved across the country in 2013 to enroll in Prokick, spending a year there. By that time, Utah had brought in earlier Prokick graduate Tom Hackett, and were pleased enough with him that they reached an agreement with Prokick director Nathan Chapman to leave a scholarship open for Wishnowsky once Hackett's Utah career ended after the 2015 season. Since Wishnowsky needed time to secure NCAA eligibility, he enrolled in and punted for Santa Barbara City College in 2014 and redshirted in 2015, remaining in Santa Barbara to complete his associate degree and conserve NCAA eligibility.

== College career ==
Wishnowsky played college football for the Santa Barbara City Vaqueros and Utah Utes. He won the Ray Guy Award and was a unanimous All-American in 2016, finishing second in FBS in punting average (47.7 yards) and first in punts downed inside the opponent's 10-yard line (17). Wishnowsky's 2017 season was only slightly less successful, with a 43.9-yard punting average and 10 punts downed inside the 10.

=== Statistics ===
Year	School	Conf	Class	Pos	G	Punting		
Year	School	Conf	Class	Pos	G	Punts	Yds	Avg
2016	Utah	Pac-12	SO	P	13	64	3,053	47.7
2017	Utah	Pac-12	JR	P	13	52	2,282	43.9
2018	Utah	Pac-12	SR	P	14	59	2,669	45.2
Career	Utah				40	175	8,004	45.7

== Professional career ==
Pre-draft measurables
Height	Weight	Arm length	Hand span	Wingspan	40-yard dash	10-yard split	20-yard split	Vertical jump	Broad jump
6 ft 2 1/8 in (1.88 m)	218 lb (99 kg)	31 1/4 in (0.79 m)	9 1/4 in (0.23 m)	6 ft 3 3/4 in (1.92 m)	4.63 s	1.58 s	2.72 s	32.5 in (0.83 m)	9 ft 9 in (2.97 m)
All values from NFL Combine

=== San Francisco 49ers ===
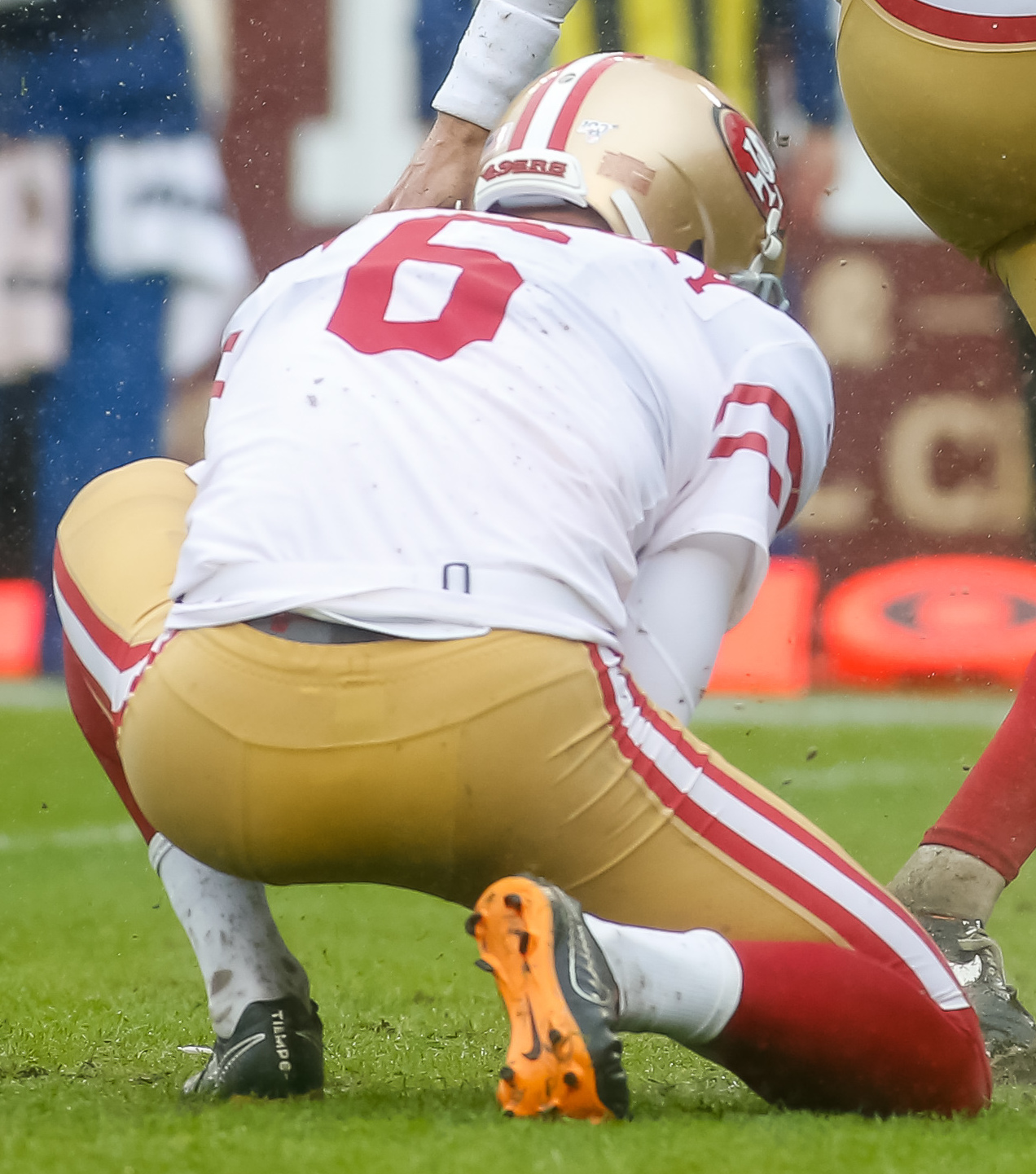
Wishnowsky in 2019

Wishnowsky was drafted by the San Francisco 49ers in the fourth round (110th overall) of the 2019 NFL draft. He was the first of two punters to be selected that year. Wishnowsky signed a four-year contract with the 49ers on 30 April 2019. During Week 9, Wishnowsky landed five punts inside the 20-yard line with a long of 50 yards in a 28–25 road victory over the Arizona Cardinals, earning him National Football Conference (NFC) Special Teams Player of the Week. As a rookie, he finished with 52 punts for a 44.87 average. Wishnowsky reached Super Bowl LIV as a rookie. However, the 49ers lost 31–20 to the Kansas City Chiefs as Wishnowsky punted twice.

In the 2020 season, Wishnowsky had 66 punts for a 46.86 average.

During Week 2 of the 2021 season, Wishnowsky averaged 45.2 yards per punt with three landing inside the 20 and one inside the five-yard line, earning NFC Special Teams Player of the Week. Due to an injury to Robbie Gould, Wishnowsky took over field goal and extra point kicking duties in Week 4 against the Seattle Seahawks. Wishnowsky made one out of two extra points and missed a 41-yard field goal. Wishnowsky is the first Australian to score a point in an NFL game. In the 2021 season, he had 57 punts for a 45.02 average.

On 16 September 2022, Wishnowsky signed a four-year, $13 million contract extension with the 49ers. In the 2022 season, he had 61 punts for a 43.87 average.

On 25 July 2023, Wishnowsky was placed on the active/non-football injury list. In the 2023 season, he had 52 punts for a 47.69 average.

During Week 5 of the 2024 season versus the Arizona Cardinals, as 49ers' kicker Jake Moody was injured in a kickoff, Wishnowsky took over the kicking duties and made the first field goal of his career, which was a 26-yard kick. On 16 November 2024, Wishnowsky was placed on injured reserve. In the 2024 season, he had 22 punts for a 45.18 average.

On 28 May 2025, Wishnowsky was released by the 49ers.

=== Washington Commanders ===
On 10 September 2025, Wishnowsky signed with the practice squad of the Washington Commanders as contingency for Tress Way, who was dealing with a back injury. Way remained healthy for the team's Week 2 matchup against the Green Bay Packers, and Wishnowsky was released by the Commanders on 13 September.

=== Buffalo Bills ===
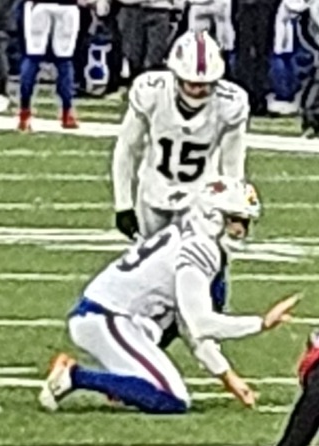
Wishnowsky (#19) in 2025

On 30 September 2025, Wishnowsky signed a one-year contract with the Buffalo Bills, replacing fellow Australian punter Cameron Johnston, who was placed on injured reserve. In the 2025 season, he punted 38 times for 1,723 yards for a 45.3 average.

On 13 March 2026, Wishnowsky re-signed with the Bills on a one-year contract. On 29 August, he was cut from the 53-man roster as a part of final roster cuts.

=== New England Patriots ===
On 31 August 2026, Wishnowsky signed with the practice squad of the New England Patriots. On 22 September, he was signed to the active roster.

== Personal life ==
Wishnowsky and his wife Maddie have a daughter.
