= Lumen Christi College =

Lumen Christi College may refer to:

- Lumen Christi College, Perth, a co-educational secondary college in Martin, Western Australia
- Lumen Christi College, Derry, a co-educational grammar school in Derry, Northern Ireland

== See also ==
- Lumen Christi Catholic High School in Jackson, Michigan
