= Nate Herbig =

American football player (born 1998)

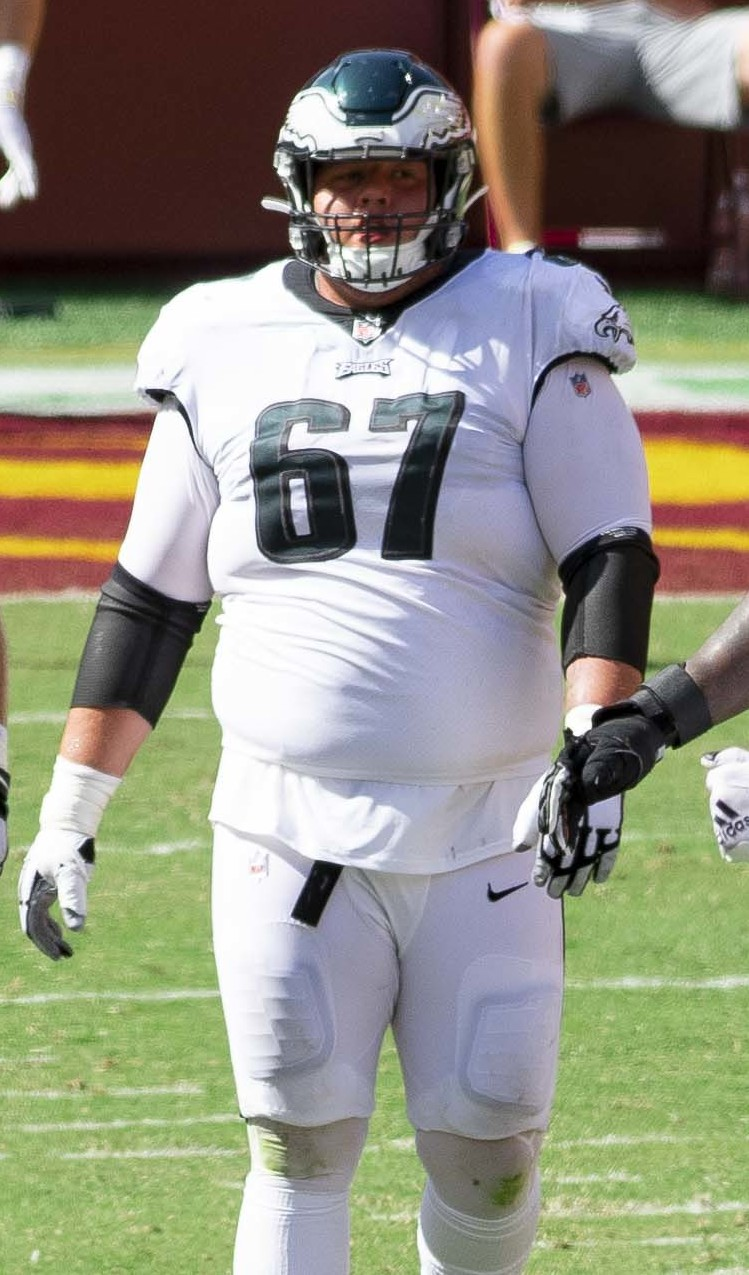
- Herbig with the Philadelphia Eagles in 2020

No. 67, 65, 71
- Position: Guard

Personal information
- Born: July 10, 1998 (age 28); Lihue, Hawaii, U.S.
- Listed height: 6 ft 4 in (1.93 m)
- Listed weight: 334 lb (151 kg)

Career information
- High school: Saint Louis (Honolulu, Hawaii)
- College: Stanford (2016–2018)
- NFL draft: 2019: undrafted

Career history
- Philadelphia Eagles (2019–2021); New York Jets (2022); Pittsburgh Steelers (2023–2024); Washington Commanders (2025)*
- * Offseason or practice squad member only

Awards and highlights
- First-team All-Pac-12 (2017); Second-team All-Pac-12 (2018)

Career NFL statistics
- Games played: 61
- Games started: 30
- Fumble recoveries: 1
- Stats at Pro Football Reference

Nathaniel William Herbig (born July 10, 1998) is an American former professional football player who was a guard for six seasons in the National Football League (NFL). He played college football for the Stanford Cardinal and signed with the Philadelphia Eagles as an undrafted free agent in 2019. Herbig also played for the New York Jets and Pittsburgh Steelers.

== Early life ==
Herbig was born on July 10, 1998, in Lihue, Hawaii. He grew up in Kalaheo, Hawaii, before moving from Kauai to Oahu after his freshman year of high school so that he could attend Saint Louis School in Honolulu. He was named first-team All-State as a senior. Herbig committed to play college football at Stanford after his junior year, but de-committed and re-opened his recruitment shortly after the end of his senior season. He ultimately re-committed to Stanford after considering offers from California and Washington.

== College career ==
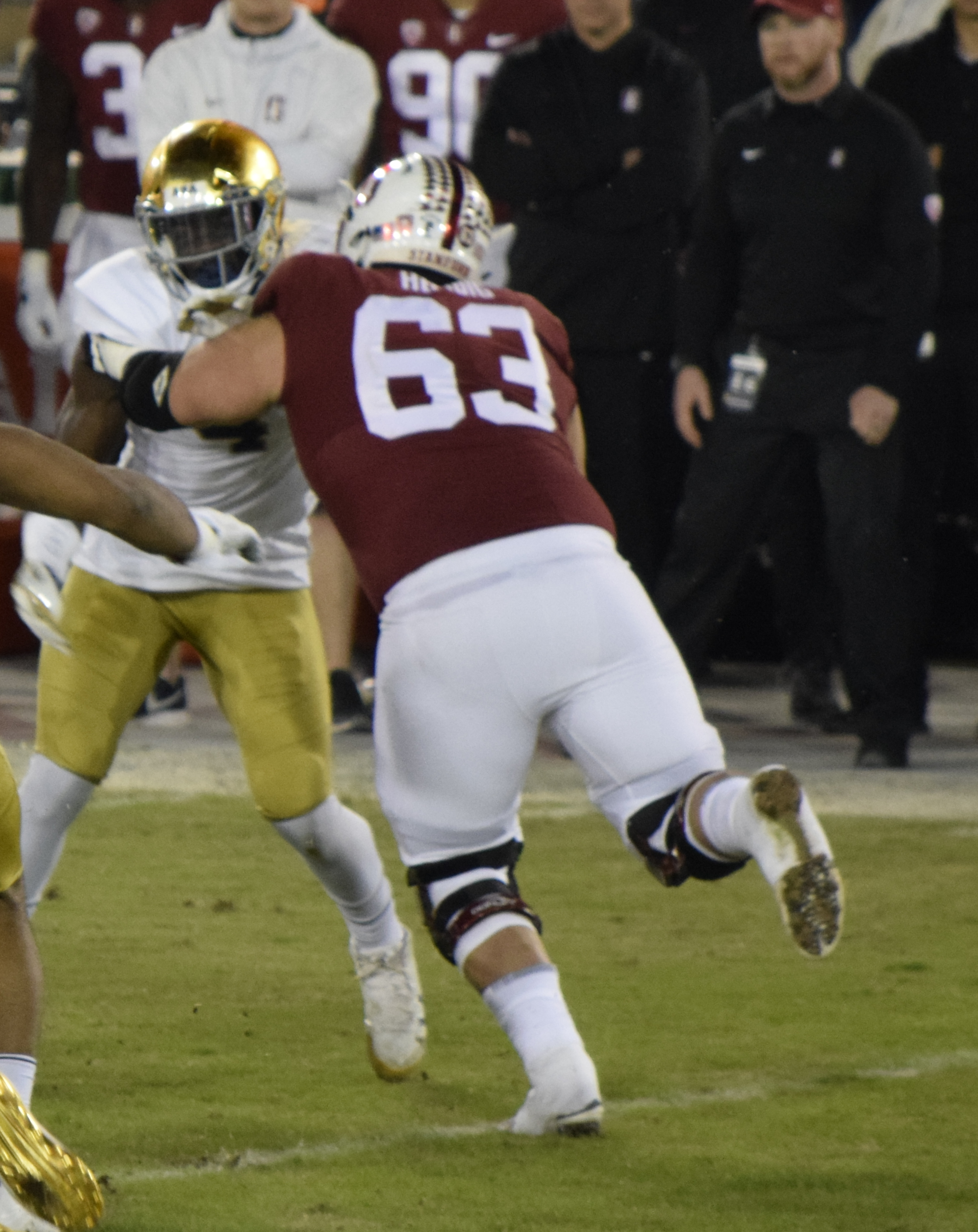
Herbig at Stanford

Herbig played three seasons for the Stanford Cardinal. He played in all 13 of Stanford's games with six starts at left guard and was named a freshman All-American by ESPN. He moved to right guard as a sophomore, making 13 starts and was named first-team All-Pac-12 Conference.

Herbig was named second-team All-Pac-12 as a junior after making six starts at right guard and one start at right tackle while missing six games due to injury. Following his Junior season, Herbig announced that he would forgo his final year of college to declare for the 2019 NFL draft.

== Professional career ==
Pre-draft measurables
Height	Weight	Arm length	Hand span	40-yard dash	10-yard split	20-yard split	20-yard shuttle	Three-cone drill	Vertical jump	Broad jump	Bench press
6 ft 3 1/2 in (1.92 m)	335 lb (152 kg)	33 1/4 in (0.84 m)	10 1/8 in (0.26 m)	5.41 s	1.85 s	3.14 s	5.04 s	8.15 s	24.0 in (0.61 m)	7 ft 6 in (2.29 m)	29 reps
All values from NFL Combine

Although initially projected to be a mid-round pick, Herbig's draft stock fell significantly after a poor performance at the NFL Scouting Combine that included a 40-yard dash time of 5.41 seconds, the slowest run of all 260 participants. He ultimately went unselected in the 2019 NFL draft.

=== Philadelphia Eagles ===
Herbig signed with the Philadelphia Eagles as an undrafted free agent on April 28, 2019. Herbig made his NFL debut on December 15, 2019, against the Washington Redskins. Herbig played in two games in his rookie season.

Herbig made his first career start on September 13, 2020, in the Eagles' season opener against the Washington Football Team. In the 2020 season, he appeared in 15 games and started 12.

After the team suffered injuries to both of their starting guards, Herbig started five games and appeared in five other games at guard for the Eagles in 2021. He was placed on the COVID list on January 3, 2022. In the 2021 regular season, Herbig played in 16 games and started five. He was activated one week later on January 10, missing just one game where the Eagles did not play their starters.

On March 15, 2022, the Eagles placed a restricted free agent tender on Herbig. After signing the tender, he was waived by the team on May 4, 2022.

=== New York Jets ===
On May 5, 2022, Herbig was claimed off waivers by the New York Jets. In the 2022 season, Herbig played in and started 11 games for the Jets. On January 7, 2023, Herbig was placed on injured reserve.

=== Pittsburgh Steelers ===
On March 16, 2023, Herbig signed a two-year contract with the Pittsburgh Steelers. On April 28, 2023, the Pittsburgh Steelers coincidentally drafted Herbig's younger brother, Nick Herbig, in the fourth round (128th overall) of the 2023 NFL draft. His brother plays linebacker and played for Wisconsin.

On August 18, 2024, it was announced that Herbig had suffered a torn rotator cuff and was ruled out for the season.

=== Washington Commanders ===
On March 20, 2025, Herbig signed with the Washington Commanders on a one-year contract. He announced his retirement from professional football on July 29.

== Personal life ==
Herbig's father, Bruce, played football and basketball at Lewis & Clark College and his grandfather played football at Wheaton College in Illinois. His younger brother Nick was his teammate with the Pittsburgh Steelers and played linebacker at Wisconsin. Herbig is of partial Japanese, Okinawan, and Native Hawaiian descent.
