= Walker Little =

American football player (born 1999)

No. 72 – Jacksonville Jaguars
- Position: Offensive tackle
- Roster status: Active

Personal information
- Born: April 1, 1999 (age 27); Houston, Texas, U.S.
- Listed height: 6 ft 7 in (2.01 m)
- Listed weight: 325 lb (147 kg)

Career information
- High school: Episcopal (Bellaire, Texas)
- College: Stanford (2017−2020)
- NFL draft: 2021: 2nd round, 45th overall pick

Career history
- Jacksonville Jaguars (2021–present)

Awards and highlights
- First-team All-Pac-12 (2018); Pac-12 Co-Offensive Freshman of the Year (2017)

Career NFL statistics as of 2025
- Games played: 70
- Games started: 39
- Stats at Pro Football Reference

Walker Douglas Little (born April 1, 1999) is an American professional football offensive tackle for the Jacksonville Jaguars of the National Football League (NFL). He played college football for the Stanford Cardinal, and was selected by the Jaguars in the second round of the 2021 NFL draft.

== Early life and college ==
Little was born in Houston, Texas, on April 1, 1999. He played high school football as an offensive tackle at Episcopal in Bellaire, Texas, where he was a consensus five-star prospect. He was recruited by over 30 colleges before committing to Stanford University in 2017 to play college football for the Cardinal. He was the first true freshman to start at left tackle for Stanford since Kirk Chambers in 2000 and was named the co-recipient of the Pac-12 Freshman Offensive Player of the Year award. He started every game in 2018 and earned All-Pac-12 first-team honors. The following year Little suffered a knee injury (torn MPFL) against Northwestern and missed the rest of the 2019 season. He decided to return to Stanford for 2020 but later opted out due to the COVID-19 pandemic.

== Professional career ==
Pre-draft measurables
| Height | Weight | Arm length | Hand span | Wingspan | 40-yard dash | 10-yard split | 20-yard split | 20-yard shuttle | Three-cone drill | Vertical jump | Broad jump | Bench press |
|---|---|---|---|---|---|---|---|---|---|---|---|---|
| 6 ft 7 3/8 in (2.02 m) | 313 lb (142 kg) | 33 3/4 in (0.86 m) | 10 1/8 in (0.26 m) | 6 ft 9 3/4 in (2.08 m) | 5.27 s | 1.82 s | 3.05 s | 4.59 s | 7.44 s | 29.5 in (0.75 m) | 9 ft 3 in (2.82 m) | 24 reps |
All values from Pro Day

Little was selected by the Jacksonville Jaguars in the second round (45th overall) of the 2021 NFL draft. Jacksonville previously obtained the second round pick after trading Yannick Ngakoue to the Minnesota Vikings. Little signed his four-year rookie contract with Jacksonville on July 20, 2021. As a rookie, he appeared in nine games and started three. In the 2022 season, he appeared in all 17 games and started three.

== Personal life ==
Little's grandfather Gene Little played college football at Rice and was selected by the New York Giants in the 18th round of the 1952 NFL draft, while his uncle Jack Little played college football at Texas A&M and was selected in the fifth round of the 1953 NFL draft by the Baltimore Colts.
