= Andre Dillard =

American football player (born 1995)

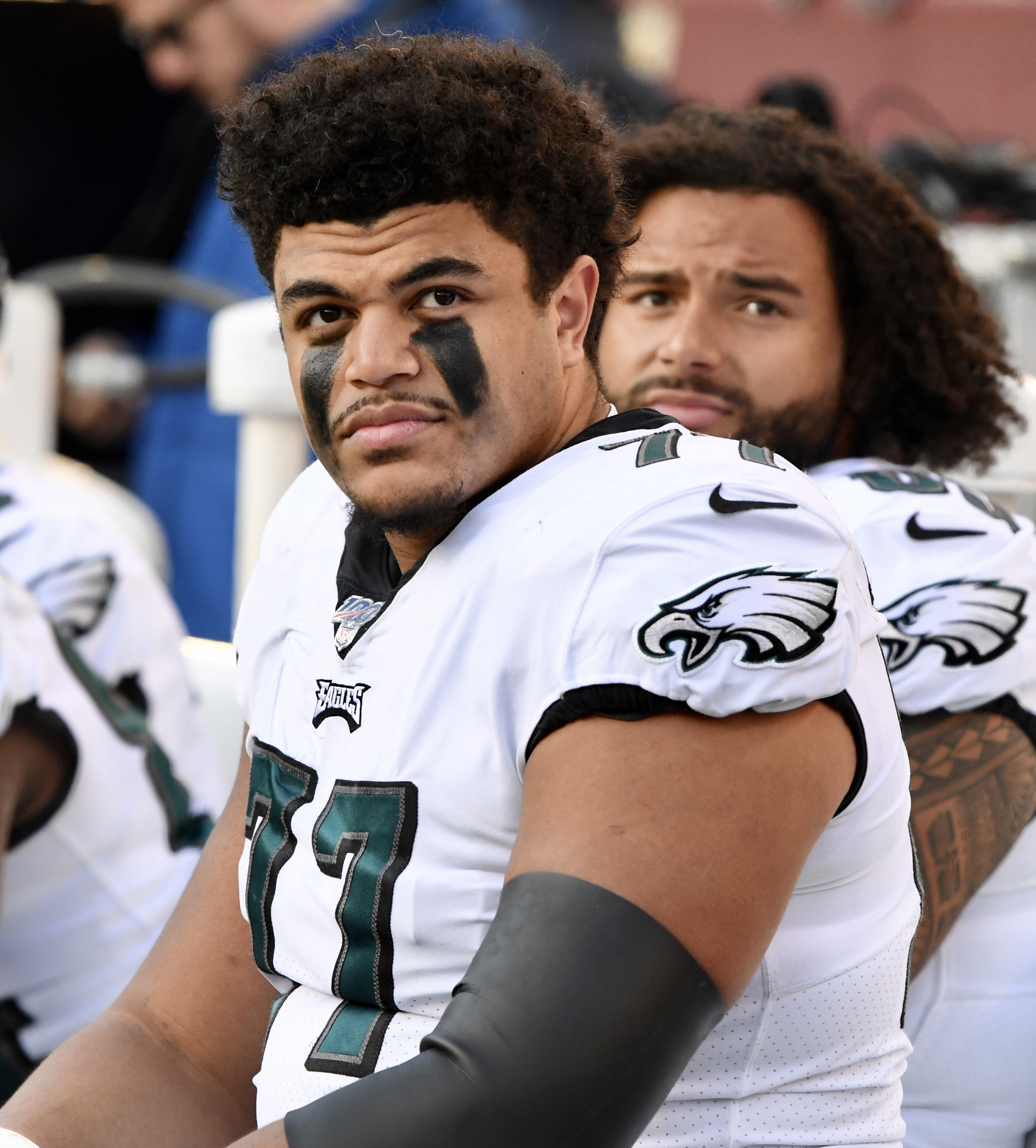
- Dillard with the Philadelphia Eagles in 2019

Profile
- Position: Offensive tackle

Personal information
- Born: October 3, 1995 (age 31); Woodinville, Washington, U.S.
- Listed height: 6 ft 5 in (1.96 m)
- Listed weight: 315 lb (143 kg)

Career information
- High school: Woodinville (WA)
- College: Washington State (2014–2018)
- NFL draft: 2019: 1st round, 22nd overall pick

Career history
- Philadelphia Eagles (2019–2022); Tennessee Titans (2023); Green Bay Packers (2024); San Francisco 49ers (2025)*
- * Offseason or practice squad member only

Awards and highlights
- First-team All-Pac-12 (2018)

Career NFL statistics as of 2024
- Games played: 69
- Games started: 19
- Stats at Pro Football Reference

Andre Clyde Dillard (born October 3, 1995) is an American professional football offensive tackle. He played college football for the Washington State Cougars and was drafted by the Philadelphia Eagles 22nd overall in the 2019 NFL draft. Dillard has also played for the Tennessee Titans and Green Bay Packers.

== College career ==
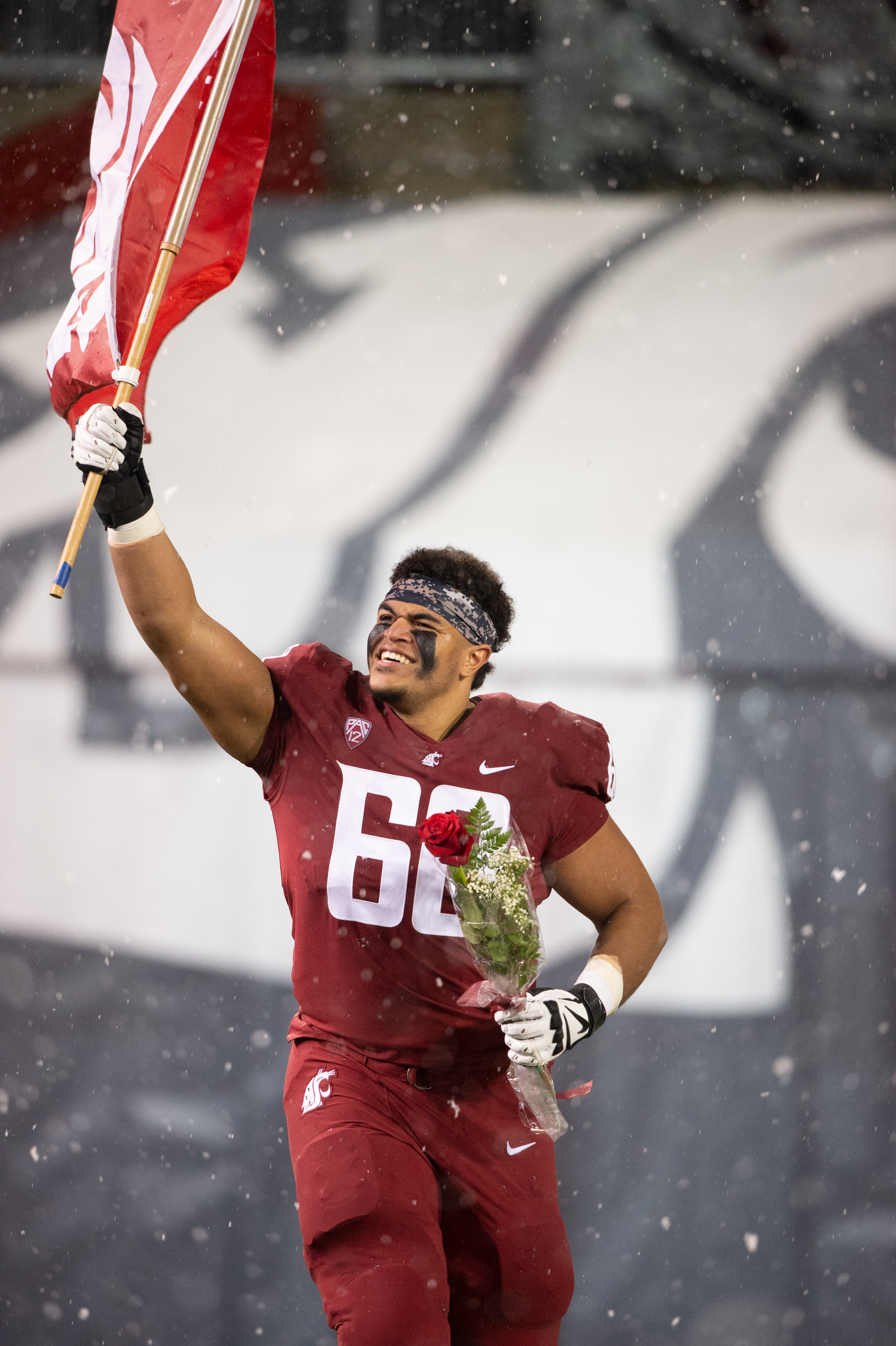
Dillard in 2018

After redshirting his first year at Washington State, Dillard played only three games during his freshman season at left tackle.

Before his junior season, strength coach Marco Candido repositioned Dillard as the replacement for left tackle Joe Dahl. During his next two seasons, he started all 26 games at left tackle.

== Professional career ==
Pre-draft measurables
Height	Weight	Arm length	Hand span	Wingspan	40-yard dash	10-yard split	20-yard split	20-yard shuttle	Three-cone drill	Vertical jump	Broad jump	Bench press
6 ft 5 in (1.96 m)	315 lb (143 kg)	33 1/2 in (0.85 m)	10 in (0.25 m)	6 ft 8 3/8 in (2.04 m)	4.96 s	1.69 s	2.86 s	4.40 s	7.44 s	29.0 in (0.74 m)	9 ft 10 in (3.00 m)	24 reps
All values from NFL Combine

=== Philadelphia Eagles ===
Dillard was drafted by the Philadelphia Eagles with the 22nd overall pick in the first round of the 2019 NFL draft. He played in all 16 games as a rookie, starting four in place of injured starters.

Dillard entered training camp in 2020 as the projected starting left tackle. However, on August 27, 2020, he suffered torn biceps and was ruled out for the season. Dillard was placed on injured reserve on September 3.

Dillard entered training camp in 2021 in a battle with Jordan Mailata for the starting left tackle role, but began the season as a backup. Due to an absence by Lane Johnson, Dillard started four games from Weeks 3 to 6 at left tackle with Mailata having been moved to right tackle during that time. Dillard was placed on the COVID list on December 20. He was removed from the COVID list nine days later.

The Eagles declined the fifth-year option on Dillard's contract on May 2, 2022, making him a free agent after the season. He was placed on injured reserve on September 6. Dillard was activated on October 15.

=== Tennessee Titans ===
On March 20, 2023, Dillard signed a three-year, $29 million contract with the Tennessee Titans. He was named the starting left tackle and started 10 of 16 games played. Dillard was released on March 15, 2024.

=== Green Bay Packers ===
On April 18, 2024, Dillard signed with the Green Bay Packers. He was named a backup tackle, playing almost exclusively on special teams.

=== San Francisco 49ers ===
On May 9, 2025, Dillard signed with the San Francisco 49ers. On August 14, he was placed on injured reserve. On August 25, Dillard was released by the 49ers with an injury settlement. On October 28, Dillard was re-signed to the 49ers' practice squad, but was released two days later.

== Personal life ==
Dillard grew up in Woodinville, WA., to Jennifer Bollinger and father, Mitch, who had also played football for Washington State Cougars as an offensive lineman from 1983 to 1986.
