= Ben Burr-Kirven =

American football player (born 1997)

No. 55
- Position: Linebacker

Personal information
- Born: September 8, 1997 (age 29); Menlo Park, California, U.S.
- Listed height: 6 ft 0 in (1.83 m)
- Listed weight: 230 lb (104 kg)

Career information
- High school: Sacred Heart Preparatory (Atherton, California)
- College: Washington (2015–2018)
- NFL draft: 2019: 5th round, 142nd overall pick

Career history
- Seattle Seahawks (2019–2022)

Awards and highlights
- First-team All-American (2018); Pac-12 Defensive Player of the Year (2018); First-team All-Pac-12 (2018); Second-team All-Pac-12 (2017)

Career NFL statistics
- Total tackles: 16
- Forced fumbles: 1
- Stats at Pro Football Reference

Ben Burr-Kirven (born September 8, 1997) is an American former professional football player who was a linebacker for the Seattle Seahawks of the National Football League (NFL). He played college football for the Washington Huskies.

== Early life ==
Burr-Kirven attended Sacred Heart Preparatory School in Atherton, California. He was the San Jose Mercury News Player of the Year as a junior and senior. He committed to the University of Washington to play college football.

== College career ==
Burr-Kirven played at Washington from 2015 to 2018. He became a starter during his junior season in 2017. As a senior in 2018, he was the Pac-12 Conference Defensive Player of the Year and a member of the Associated Press All-America team. He majored in film studies at Washington, and received honors from the department.

== Professional career ==
Pre-draft measurables
Height	Weight	Arm length	Hand span	40-yard dash	10-yard split	20-yard split	20-yard shuttle	Three-cone drill	Vertical jump	Broad jump	Bench press
6 ft 0 in (1.83 m)	230 lb (104 kg)	31 7/8 in (0.81 m)	8 7/8 in (0.23 m)	4.56 s	1.55 s	2.67 s	4.09 s	6.85 s	34.5 in (0.88 m)	10 ft 1 in (3.07 m)	21 reps
All values from NFL Combine

Burr-Kirven was selected by the Seattle Seahawks in the fifth round (142nd overall) of the 2019 NFL draft. As a rookie, he appeared in 16 games. He recorded a forced fumble and mainly played on special teams.

Burr-Kirven was placed on injured reserve on August 23, 2021, after suffering a torn ACL in the preseason. He was waived on July 26, 2022, and placed on the reserve/physically unable to perform list.

On March 10, 2023, Burr-Kirven was released by the Seahawks. He was re-signed by the Seahawks on July 27. He was released on August 29.

== See also ==
- List of NCAA major college football yearly tackles leaders
