= Luc Bequette =

American football player (born 1997)

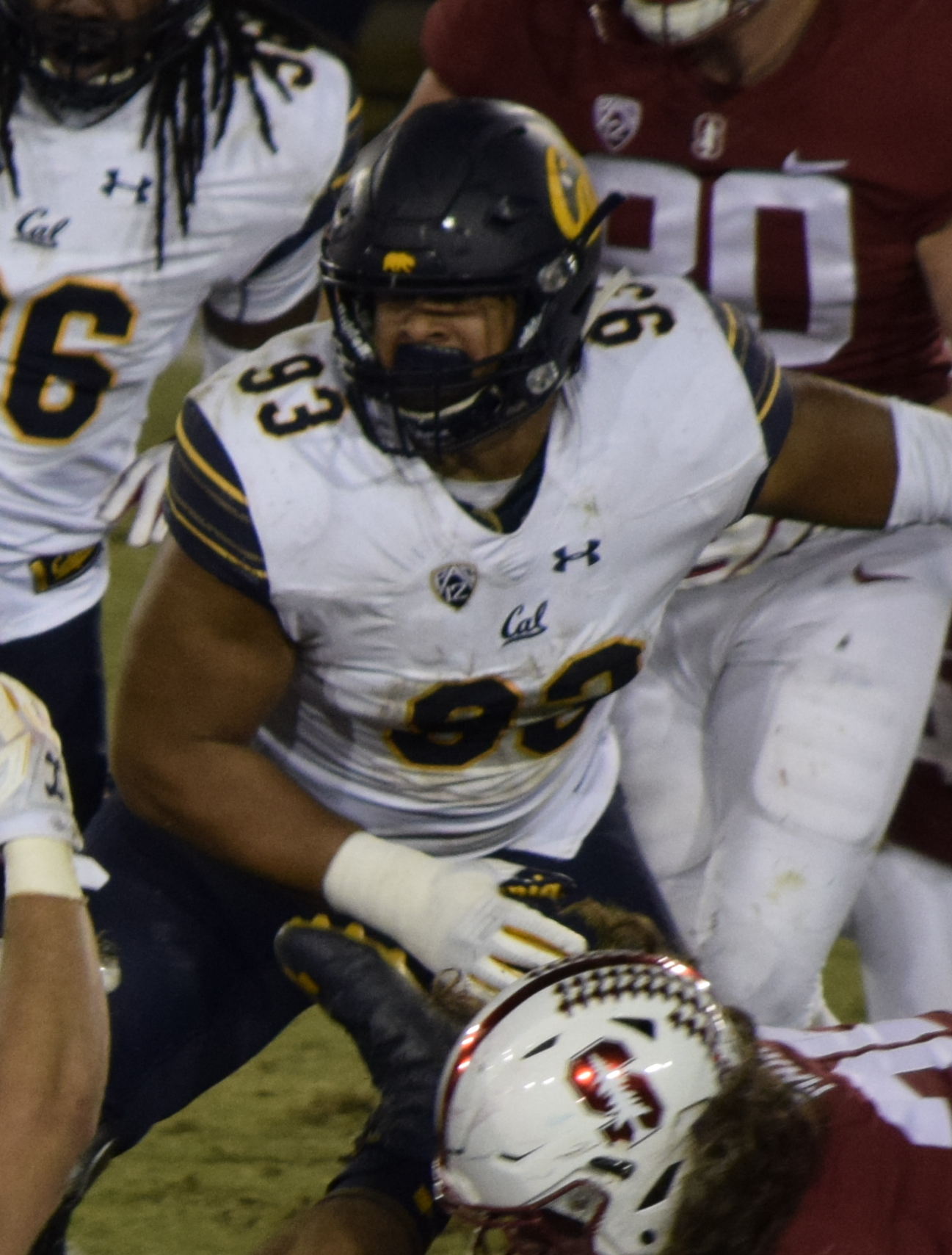
- Bequette with California in 2017

No. 93
- Position: Defensive tackle

Personal information
- Born: July 1, 1997 (age 29); Chicago, Illinois, U.S.
- Listed height: 6 ft 2 in (1.88 m)
- Listed weight: 295 lb (134 kg)

Career information
- High school: St. Thomas More (Champaign, Illinois); Champaign Centennial High School (Champaign, Illinois); Catholic HS for Boys (Little Rock, Arkansas)
- College: California (2015-2019); Boston College (2020); California (2021)

Awards and highlights
- Honorable Mention All-Pac-12 (2018); Third-team All-Pac-12 by Phil Steele (2018); Pac-12 Defensive Player of the Week (2018); PFF NCAA Week 11 – Team of the Week (2018)
- Stats at ESPN

Luc Bequette (born July 1, 1997) is an American college football defensive lineman who played NCAA football for the California Golden Bears and the Boston College Eagles. He is the only son of 1988 Olympic bronze medalist Debi Thomas and former Arkansas Razorback football player Chris Bequette. He is also a first cousin of former New England Patriot football player and failed U.S. Senate candidate Jake Bequette.

== Early life ==
Bequette attended Catholic High School for Boys in Little Rock, Arkansas. He was both the starting center and a starting defensive tackle in his 2014 senior campaign after transferring from Champaign Centennial High School in Champaign, Illinois in 2013. Bequette earned an All-State and first-team All-Big Twelve selection on offense and a second-team all-league selection on defense in his 2013 junior campaign at Centennial High School. He earned first-team All 7A/6A honors on defense in his 2014 senior year at Catholic High School for Boys.

Bequette was listed as a three-star recruit, ranked No. 71 strong-side defensive end and No. 1,535 overall prospect in the country for the 2015 class.

== College career ==
In 2014, Bequette committed to the University of California, Berkeley. He redshirted his first year at California in 2015.

=== 2016 season ===
In 2016, Bequette made his collegiate debut in Sydney, Australia where Cal played Hawaii in the Sydney College Football Cup. He played in the first four games recording two tackles, both coming against San Diego State before suffering a season-ending ACL injury prior to playing Utah. He was later granted a sixth-year of eligibility from a medical redshirt.

=== 2017 season ===
In 2017, Bequette was named one of Cal's starting defensive ends in new head coach Justin Wilcox's 3-4 defense. He was one of seven players on Cal's team to start all twelve games and helped the Bears improve from ranking 127th in scoring defense in 2016 to 79th in 2017.

Bequette helped the Bears defeat North Carolina on the road 35–30, registering five tackles, 0.5 tackles for loss and 0.5 sacks. He also picked up four tackles and a fumble recovery when the Bears faced No. 5 ranked USC at home and kept the score tied through three quarters before ultimately falling to the Trojans 30–20. Against No. 8 ranked Washington State, Bequette helped the Bears rout the Cougars 37–3 at home, posting three tackles and 1.5 sacks in the upset.

Bequette finished his 2017 campaign with 27 total tackles, 2.0 tackles for loss, 2.0 sacks, and a fumble recovery. After the Bears' season ended at 5–7, he earned the team's Bob Tessier Award as its Most Improved Lineman.

=== 2018 season ===
In 2018, Bequette was one of ten players to start all thirteen games. He helped lead a Cal defense that ranked nationally 22nd in scoring defense and 15th in total defense.

Bequette won Pac-12 Defensive Player of the Week honors when the Bears defeated the USC Trojans for the first time since 2003, winning 15–14 on the road. He recorded nine tackles, 2.5 tackles for loss, 2.0 sacks, and a forced fumble to stop a likely USC scoring drive just before halftime. He was also included on the Pro Football Focus NCAA Week 11 – Team of the Week with a PFF grade of 85.7.

Against North Carolina, Bequette served as one of Cal's team game captains where he posted two tackles in the 24–17 home victory. He also recorded six tackles in a loss against Oregon at home, five tackles, 1.0 tackle for loss, and 1.0 sack in a road victory against Oregon State, and four tackles and a forced fumble in a road loss to Arizona. The Bears finished the season 7–5 and faced TCU in the 2018 Cheez-It Bowl where Bequette registered seven tackles in the 10-7 overtime loss to the Horned Frogs.

Bequette totaled 49 tackles, 6.5 tackles for loss, a team-high-tying 5.0 sacks, one pass breakup, two quarterback hurries, two forced fumbles, and a blocked kick. He ranked 8th in the Pac-12 Conference in both total sacks and sacks per game (0.38). He also ranked 4th overall on Cal's team and 1st among defensive linemen in total tackles. Bequette was awarded third-team All-Pac-12 by Phil Steele and honorable mention All-Pac-12 by choice of the conference's coaches. He also received Cal's Brick Muller Award as its Most Valuable Lineman on defense.

=== 2019 season ===
In 2019, Bequette was one of seven players for the Bears to start all thirteen games. He showed versatility by playing all three positions across the defensive line (nose guard, defensive tackle, defensive end). Bequette received preseason honors including second-team preseason All-Pac-12 from Athlon Sports, second-team preseason All-Pac-12 from the league's media members, third-team All-Pac-12 selections for Lindy's Sports and Phil Steele, and honorable mention All-Pac-12 of Pro Football Focus. During the season, he earned first-team midseason All-Pac-12 honors from Bay Area News Group and second-team midseason All-Pac-12 honors from SB Nation.

In the Bears' 20–19 victory at No. 14 Washington, Bequette recorded seven tackles, 1.5 tackles for loss, and 1.5 sacks. Later in the year, Bequette added nine tackles and a forced fumble against No. 13 Oregon, helping the Bears keep the Ducks scoreless after the first half, though ultimately losing on the road 17–7. Bequette also posted five tackles and two pass breakups as No. 23 Cal beat Ole Miss on the road 28–20. He recorded six tackles against Oregon State and finished the season with five tackles against Illinois in the Bears' 35–20 Redbox Bowl victory.

Bequette totaled a career-high 52 tackles, 4.0 tackles for loss, 3.0 sacks, two pass breakups, and two forced fumbles. He was awarded Cal's Brick Muller Award as its Most Valuable Lineman.

=== 2020 season ===
After the Pac-12 announced their original intent to postpone the conference's season due to COVID-19 on August 11, 2020, Bequette entered the transfer portal. He decided to play the eleven-game season for Boston College. Despite only practicing for two weeks, Bequette started all eleven games. He made four tackles and forced a fumble against Georgia Tech, forced a fumble and made 1.0 tackles for loss against Syracuse, and ended the season with his best game coming against Virginia, registering a season-high six tackles with a nine-yard sack. In his time in Boston, he totaled 18 tackles, 3.0 tackles for loss, 1.0 sack, and two forced fumbles.

=== 2021 season ===
Taking advantage of the NCAA blanket waiver, allowing all 2020 Fall sports athletes to retain a year of eligibility due to COVID-19, Bequette entered the transfer portal again. He returned to the California Golden Bears for his seventh season in the Summer before the 2021 college football season. He awaited approval from the NCAA concerning his eligibility to compete in the Fall 2021 season.

Bequette was cleared for the 2021 season in August and was also added to Jon Wilner's 2nd Team All-Pac-12 list.

In 2021, Bequette added 41 tackles, 4.5 TFLs, 3.5 sacks, and 4 PBUs across 11 games. His 11 games played and 11 starts put him in at 64 career games played and 60 career starts to end his collegiate career. From 2017 to 2021, Bequette started 57 consecutive games before missing the game against the Arizona Wildcats due to contracting COVID-19, which ended his streak. Bequette's 57 consecutive starts are an NCAA record according to STATS.

=== Statistics ===
College defensive stats
Season	Team	Class	Games			Tackles					Fumbles			Def Int			
Season	Team	Class	Pos	GP	GS	Solo	Ast	Tot	TFL	Sack	FF	FR	TD	Int	Yds	TD	PBU
2015^	California	FR	DT	-	-	-	-	-	-	-	-	-	-	-	-	-	-
2016	California	rFR	DT	4	0	1	1	2	0.0	0.0	0	0	0	0	0	0	0
2017	California	rSO	DL	12	12	6	21	27	2.0	2.0	0	1	0	0	0	0	0
2018^	California	rJR	DL	13	13	26	21	47	6.5	5.0	2	0	0	0	0	0	1
2019^	California	rSR	DL	13	13	25	27	52	4.0	3.0	2	0	0	0	0	0	2
2020*	Boston College	6th	DT	11	11	7	11	18	3.0	1.0	2	1	0	0	0	0	1
2021	California	7th	DL	11	11	15	26	41	4.5	3.5	0	0	0	0	0	0	4
Career				64	60	80	107	187	20	14.5	6	2	0	0	0	0	8
^ indicates bowl stats included, * indicates shortened year due to COVID-19

== Prospective pro career ==
Bequette was not drafted in the 2022 NFL draft. However, in preparation for that draft and a potential pro career, he participated in the College Gridiron Showcase All-Star game from January 8 to January 12. Bequette tested at Cal's Pro Day where he repped 225 pounds on the bench press for 25 reps, jumped 33 inches in the vertical jump, jumped 9 feet 4 inches in the broad jump, ran a 5.11-second 40-yard dash, ran a 4.58-second 20-yard shuttle, and ran a 7.62-second three-cone drill. In addition, Bequette ran through position-specific drills to conclude the event. Bequette's 33-inch vertical jump would have tied for first place among defensive tackles at the 2022 NFL Combine.
