= Marquise Blair =

American football player (born 1997)

Profile
- Position: Safety / Slot cornerback

Personal information
- Born: July 18, 1997 (age 29); Little Rock, Arkansas, U.S.
- Listed height: 6 ft 1 in (1.85 m)
- Listed weight: 196 lb (89 kg)

Career information
- High school: Wooster (OH)
- College: Dodge City CC (2015–2016); Utah (2017–2018)
- NFL draft: 2019: 2nd round, 47th overall pick

Career history
- Seattle Seahawks (2019–2021); Carolina Panthers (2022); Philadelphia Eagles (2022–2023)*; Seattle Seahawks (2024); New York Jets (2024)*
- * Offseason or practice squad member only

Awards and highlights
- Second-team All-Pac-12 (2018)

Career NFL statistics as of 2024
- Total tackles: 52
- Forced fumbles: 3
- Pass deflections: 3
- Stats at Pro Football Reference

Marquise Damond Blair (born July 18, 1997) is an American professional football safety. He played college football at Utah.

== Early life ==
Blair attended Wooster High School in Wooster, Ohio. He was a First-team Division II all-state as a senior at Wooster High (Ohio). Also named first-team Division II All-Ohio and Ohio Cardinal Conference Defensive Player of the Year.

== College career ==
Blair attended Dodge City Community College before transferring to the University of Utah after the 2016 season. he was a first-team junior college All-American selection he had over 100 tackles, 3 sacks, and 4 interceptions. He was an all-conference pick for Dodge City as a freshman.

The former first-team All-State pick in Ohio eventually worked his way into the starting lineup with the Utes in 2017, starting 6 of 9 games and making over 48 tackles, three for loss, and two pass breakups. before suffering a season-ending injury against UCLA. As a senior, He started in all 14 games with 12 starts in 2018, garnering second-team All-Pac-12 honors along with 17 of his teammates. He finished the year with 59 stops, two for loss, two interceptions, two pass breakups, and a forced fumble.

== Professional career ==
Pre-draft measurables
Height	Weight	Arm length	Hand span	40-yard dash	10-yard split	20-yard split	20-yard shuttle	Three-cone drill	Vertical jump	Broad jump
6 ft 1 1/4 in (1.86 m)	195 lb (88 kg)	30 3/4 in (0.78 m)	8 1/4 in (0.21 m)	4.48 s	1.55 s	2.63 s	4.49 s	6.84 s	35.0 in (0.89 m)	10 ft 5 in (3.18 m)
All values from NFL Combine/Pro Day

=== Seattle Seahawks (first stint) ===
Blair was selected by the Seattle Seahawks in the second round, 47th overall, of the 2019 NFL draft.

==== 2020 ====
Blair started the 2020 NFL season being named the starting nickelback for the Seahawks, switching over from his original position at safety. He started the season by having seven tackles (four solo) in the Seahawks' first game of the season. Blair also generated a forced fumble in the game that was against the Atlanta Falcons and helped the team secure a 38–25 victory at the Mercedes-Benz Stadium. In the second game of the season against the New England Patriots, Blair had to step into the role of free safety after starting free safety Quandre Diggs was ejected for a helmet-to-helmet hit during the game. Blair's season was cut short a few plays later when a teammate rolled onto his leg following a tackle resulting in Blair tearing his anterior cruciate ligament. He was placed on injured reserve on September 23.

==== 2021 ====
Blair entered the 2021 season as the backup free safety to Quandre Diggs. He played in six games before suffering a knee injury in Week 7. He was placed on injured reserve on November 12, 2021.

On August 30, 2022, Blair was waived by the Seahawks.

=== Carolina Panthers ===
On September 5, 2022, Blair signed with the practice squad of the Carolina Panthers. He was promoted to the active roster on November 6, 2022, before being released the following day.

=== Philadelphia Eagles ===
On November 16, 2022, Blair signed with the Philadelphia Eagles practice squad. He was released on December 13.

On February 9, 2023, Blair signed a reserve/futures deal with the Eagles. He was released by the team on April 24, with an NFI designation.

=== Seattle Seahawks (second stint) ===
On July 26, 2024, Blair was signed by the Seattle Seahawks. He was released on August 27, and re-signed to the practice squad. He was released on September 24.

=== New York Jets ===
On October 17, 2024, Blair was signed to the New York Jets practice squad. He was released on November 5.
