= Josh Nurse =

American football player (born 1996)

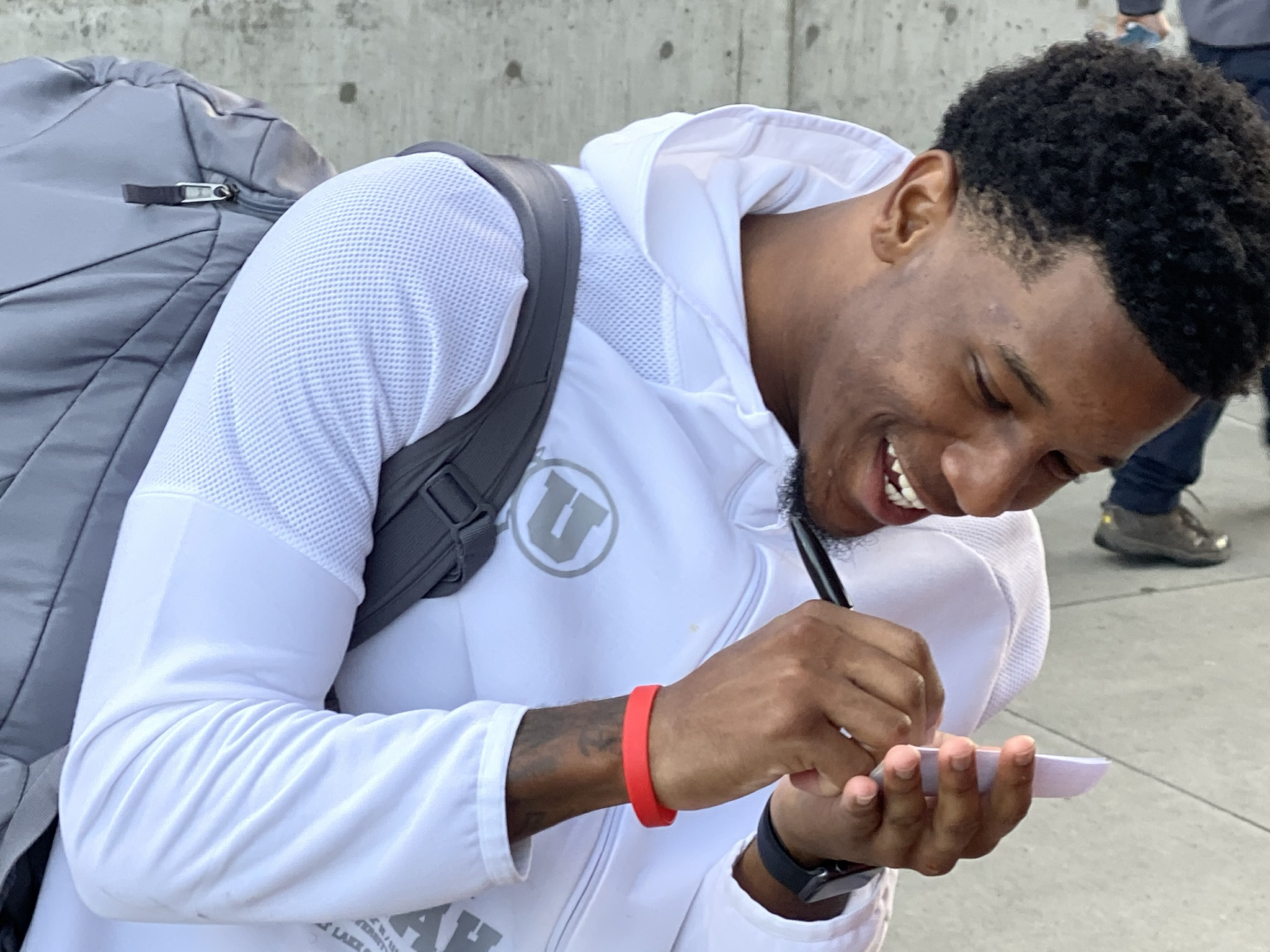
- Nurse giving an autograph with Utah in 2019

No. 14
- Position: Cornerback

Personal information
- Born: July 17, 1996 (age 30); East Point, Georgia, U.S.
- Listed height: 6 ft 3 in (1.91 m)
- Listed weight: 200 lb (91 kg)

Career information
- High school: Sandy Creek (GA)
- College: Utah
- NFL draft: 2020: undrafted

Career history
- Baltimore Ravens (2020)*; Jacksonville Jaguars (2020); Calgary Stampeders (2021)*; Birmingham Stallions (2022); Memphis Showboats (2023); Edmonton Elks (2023)*
- * Offseason or practice squad member only

Awards and highlights
- USFL champion (2022)

Career NFL statistics
- Games played: 2
- Stats at Pro Football Reference

Josh Nurse (born July 17, 1996) is an American former professional football player who was a cornerback in the National Football League (NFL). He was signed by the Baltimore Ravens as an undrafted free agent in 2020 following his college football career with the Utah Utes. He was also a member of the Jacksonville Jaguars, Calgary Stampeders, Birmingham Stallions, Memphis Showboats, and Edmonton Elks.

== Professional career ==
Pre-draft measurables
Height	Weight	Arm length	Hand span
6 ft 3 1/8 in (1.91 m)	197 lb (89 kg)	33 in (0.84 m)	8 3/4 in (0.22 m)
All values from Pro Day

=== Baltimore Ravens ===
Nurse signed with the Baltimore Ravens as an undrafted free agent following the 2020 NFL draft on May 5, 2020. He was waived during final roster cuts on September 5, 2020.

=== Jacksonville Jaguars ===
Nurse signed to the Jacksonville Jaguars' practice squad on September 14, 2020, and was released five days later. He re-signed to the practice squad on September 21. He was placed on the practice squad/COVID-19 list by the team on October 17, 2020, and was activated back to the practice squad on October 22. He was elevated to the active roster on November 7 and November 28 for the team's weeks 9 and 12 game against the Houston Texans and Cleveland Browns, and reverted to the practice squad after each game. He was placed back on the practice squad/COVID-19 list on December 18, 2020, and restored to the practice squad again on December 23. He signed a reserve/future contract on January 4, 2021. He was waived on March 17, 2021.

=== Calgary Stampeders ===
Nurse signed with the Calgary Stampeders of the CFL on June 23, 2021. He was released on July 25, 2021.

=== Birmingham Stallions ===
Nurse signed with the Birmingham Stallions of the United States Football League on June 14, 2022.

=== Memphis Showboats ===
Nurse was traded to the Memphis Showboats on January 11, 2023. He was released on May 9, 2023.

=== Edmonton Elks ===
On September 18, 2023, it was announced that Nurse had been signed to the practice roster of the Edmonton Elks. He was released on October 17, 2023.
