= Alijah Holder =

American football player (born 1996)

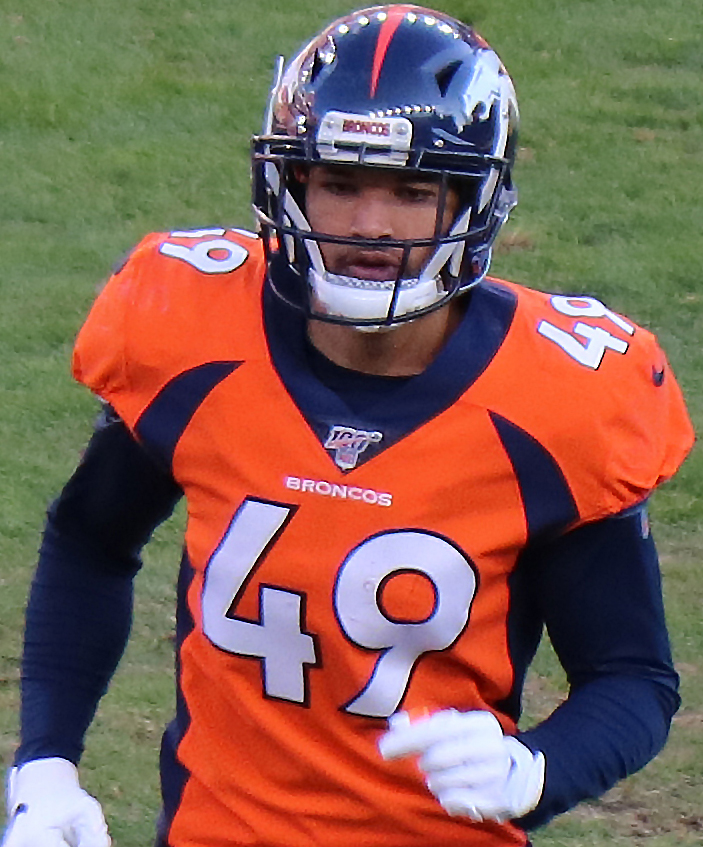
- Holder with the Denver Broncos in the 2019

No. 49
- Position: Safety

Personal information
- Born: January 26, 1996 (age 30); Oceanside, California, U.S.
- Listed height: 6 ft 2 in (1.88 m)
- Listed weight: 188 lb (85 kg)

Career information
- High school: Oceanside (CA)
- College: Stanford (2014–2018)
- NFL draft: 2019: undrafted

Career history
- Denver Broncos (2019–2020); Detroit Lions (2021)*; Houston Gamblers (2022); Seattle Sea Dragons (2023); Birmingham Stallions (2024)*; San Antonio Brahmas (2024)*
- * Offseason or practice squad member only
- H/HoldAl01.htm Stats at Pro Football Reference

Alijah Holder (born January 26, 1996) is an American former football safety. He played college football at Stanford.

== College career ==
Holder played as a cornerback for the Stanford Cardinals. He did not play during his freshman year in 2014. Holder's first active season was played during his sophomore year in 2015; before he missed nine games due to injury during his junior year in 2016. After recovery, Holder played only four games during his junior year. During his senior year in 2017, Holder was named part of the Pac-12 All-Academic second-team. He played a fifth season in 2018, starting 10 of 12 games. Holder earned honorable mention in the 2018 All-Pac-12. He also became a three-time Pac-12 All-Academic. While at Stanford, Holder majored in media studies.

== Professional career ==
Pre-draft measurables
Height	Weight	Arm length	Hand span	40-yard dash	20-yard shuttle	Three-cone drill	Vertical jump	Broad jump	Bench press
6 ft 0 3/4 in (1.85 m)	191 lb (87 kg)	32 1/2 in (0.83 m)	9 1/2 in (0.24 m)	4.60 s	4.15 s	6.70 s	36.0 in (0.91 m)	10 ft 1 in (3.07 m)	9 reps
All values from NFL Combine

=== Denver Broncos ===
Holder signed with the Denver Broncos as an undrafted free agent on May 2, 2019. He was waived on August 31, 2019, and re-signed to the practice squad. He was promoted to the active roster on December 17, 2019.

On September 5, 2020, Holder was waived by the Broncos, but was signed to the practice squad the next day. He was elevated to the active roster on November 7, November 21, November 28, and December 5 for the team's weeks 9, 11, 12, and 13 games against the Atlanta Falcons, Miami Dolphins, New Orleans Saints, and Kansas City Chiefs, and reverted to the practice squad after each game. On December 12, 2020, Holder was promoted to the active roster. On February, 2, 2021, the Broncos waived Holder.

=== Detroit Lions ===
On May 17, 2021, Holder signed with the Detroit Lions. He was waived on August 30, 2021.

=== Houston Gamblers ===
Holder signed with the Houston Gamblers of the United States Football League on April 28, 2022.

=== Seattle Sea Dragons ===
The Seattle Sea Dragons selected Holder in the ninth round of the 2023 XFL Supplemental Draft on January 1, 2023. The Sea Dragons folded when the XFL and USFL merged to create the United Football League (UFL).

=== Birmingham Stallions ===
On January 15, 2024, Holder was selected by the Birmingham Stallions in the second round of the Super Draft portion of the 2024 UFL dispersal draft. He signed with the team on January 22.

=== San Antonio Brahmas ===
On January 22, 2024, Holder was traded to the San Antonio Brahmas in exchange for defensive back Bubba Bolden. He was waived on January 31, 2024.
