= Lumen Christi College, Perth =

School in Perth, Western Australia

Lumen Christi College

Location
- Martin; Western Australia; Australia; 32°04′12.9″S 116°00′50.8″E

Information
- Type: independent secondary day school
- Motto: Christ My Light
- Religious affiliation: Roman Catholic
- Established: 1984; 42 years ago
- Educational authority: Catholic Education Western Australia
- Principal: Karen Prendergast
- Employees: c. 100
- Years taught: 7–12
- Gender: co-educational
- Enrolment: c. 1,000 (2018)
- Campus size: 20 hectares (49 acres)
- Colours: sky blue; maroon
- Website: lumen.wa.edu.au

Lumen Christi College is an independent Roman Catholic co-educational secondary day school, located the south-eastern Perth suburb of Martin, Western Australia.

The school provides a religious and general education to students from Year 7 to Year 12. The school has five houses, Campbell, Mackillop, Salvado, Tangney & Yagan.

== History ==
The school was founded in 1984 with its first intake of 150 Year 8 students. The school currently has a six-stream enrolment of over 900 students ranging from Years 7–12. In 2008, a male teacher was charged with having an inappropriate sexual relationship with a Year 12 student and was dismissed from his role. There is limited information available about what occurred after the incident.

== See also ==
- List of schools in the Perth metropolitan area
- Catholic education in Australia
