= 2017 Conference USA football season =

- League: NCAA Division I Football Bowl Subdivision
- Sport: Football
- Duration: August 26, 2017 through December 27, 2017
- Teams: 14
- TV partner(s): ESPN, CBS Sports Network, Stadium, beIN Sports, CUSA.tv, FloSports

2018 NFL Draft
- Top draft pick: DE Marcus Davenport, UTSA
- Picked by: New Orleans Saints, 14th overall

Regular season
- Season MVP: RB Devin Singletary, FAU
- East champions: Florida Atlantic
- West champions: North Texas

Championship Game
- Champions: Florida Atlantic
- Runners-up: North Texas
- Finals MVP: WR Kalib Woods, FAU

Football seasons
- 2016 2018

2017 Conference USA football standings
	Conf.			Overall
Team	W		L	W		L
East Division
Florida Atlantic x$	8	–	0	11	–	3
FIU	5	–	3	8	–	5
Marshall	4	–	4	8	–	5
Middle Tennessee	4	–	4	7	–	6
Western Kentucky	4	–	4	6	–	7
Old Dominion	3	–	5	5	–	7
Charlotte	1	–	7	1	–	11
West Division
North Texas x	7	–	1	9	–	5
Southern Miss	6	–	2	8	–	5
UAB	6	–	2	8	–	5
Louisiana Tech	4	–	4	7	–	6
UTSA	3	–	5	6	–	5
Rice	1	–	7	1	–	11
UTEP	0	–	8	0	–	12
Championship: Florida Atlantic 41, North Texas 17
$ – Conference champion; x – Division champion/co-champions; Rankings from AP Poll

The 2017 Conference USA football season was the 22nd season of Conference USA football and part of the 2017 NCAA Division I FBS football season. The season began on August 26 with Rice facing Stanford in Sydney, Australia. This season was the third season for C-USA under realignment that took place in 2014, which added the 14th member Charlotte from the Atlantic 10 Conference. C-USA is a "Group of Five" conference under the College Football Playoff format along with the American Athletic Conference, the Mid-American Conference, the Mountain West Conference, and the Sun Belt Conference.

The C-USA consisted of 14 members: Charlotte, FIU, Florida Atlantic, Louisiana Tech, Marshall, Middle Tennessee, North Texas, Old Dominion, Rice, Southern Miss, UAB, UTEP, UTSA, and Western Kentucky; and was divided into the East and West divisions. UAB began play for the first time since 2014, after the Blazer football program was dropped from competition.

== Preseason ==
=== Media predictions ===
The 2017 preseason media football poll was released on July 18. Western Kentucky was picked to win its third straight East Division title, while Louisiana Tech was picked to repeat as West Division champion.

East Division

1. Western Kentucky (20 first-place votes)
2. Middle Tennessee (4)
3. Old Dominion (3)
4. Marshall (1)
5. Florida Atlantic
6. FIU
7. Charlotte

West Division

1. Louisiana Tech (20)
2. UTSA (7)
3. Southern Miss (1)
4. North Texas
5. Rice
6. UTEP
7. UAB

=== Preseason awards ===
The conference preseason awards were released on July 17. WKU senior QB Mike White was selected as the C-USA Offensive Player of the Year. Rice senior LB Emmanuel Ellerbee was selected the Defensive Player of the Year, and WKU senior KR Kylen Towner was selected Special Teams Player of the Year honors

Offense
Position	Player	Class	Team
QB	Mike White	Senior	Western Kentucky
WR	Richie James	Junior	Middle Tennessee
WR	Jonathan Duhart	Senior	Old Dominion
WR	Allenzae Staggers	Senior	Southern Miss
RB	Ray Lawry	Senior	Old Dominion
RB	Ito Smith	Senior	Southern Miss
OL	O’Shea Dugas	Junior	Louisiana Tech
OL	Will Hernandez	Senior	UTEP
OL	Trey Martin	Senior	Rice
OL	Austin Pratt	Senior	UTSA
OL	Brandon Ray	Senior	Western Kentucky
TE	Ryan Yurachek	Senior	Marshall

Defense
Position	Player	Class	Team
DL	Marcus Davenport	Senior	UTSA
DL	Jaylon Ferguson	Sophomore	Louisiana Tech
DL	Chris Johnson	Senior	Western Kentucky
DL	Oshane Ximines	Senior	Old Dominion
LB	Emmanuel Ellerbee	Senior	Rice
LB	Alvin Jones	Senior	UTEP
LB	Josiah Tauaefa	Sophomore	UTSA
LB	Anthony Wint	Senior	FIU
DB	Brandon Addison	Senior	Old Dominion
DB	Nate Brooks	Junior	North Texas
DB	Joe Brown	Senior	Western Kentucky
DB	Kishawn McClain	Senior	North Texas

Specialists
Position	Player	Class	Team
P	Jake Collins	Junior	Western Kentucky
K	Canon Rooker	Senior	Middle Tennessee
KR	Kylen Towner	Senior	Western Kentucky
PR	Nacarius Fant	Senior	Western Kentucky
LS	Matt Bayliss	Senior	UTSA

- Preseason Offensive Player of the Year: Mike White, Senior, QB, WKU
- Preseason Defensive Player of the Year: Emmanuel Ellerbee, Senior, LB, Rice
- Preseason Special Teams Player of the Year: Kylen Towner, Senior, KR, WKU

== Head coaches ==
Three Conference USA teams hired new head coaches for the 2017 season. All three were in the East Division, and all three were replacing coaches who had spent at least three seasons at their respective schools.

- FIU hired Butch Davis to replace Ron Turner, who was fired after going 0–4 with the panthers. Ron Cooper was promoted as interim head coach after the fire until the hire of Davis. Davis is coming from a break from coaching football from 2011 to 2016. He was the head coach for many teams in college such as North Carolina and teams in NFL. Littrell was hired on November 14, 2016.
- Florida Atlantic hired Lane Kiffin to replace Charlie Partridge, who was fired after leading the Owls to a 9–27 record during his three-year tenure at Florida Atlantic. Kiffin spent three years prior to Florida Atlantic at Alabama as an offensive coordinator under the head coach, Nick Saban. Lane was hired on December 12, 2016.
- Western Kentucky hired Mike Sanford Jr. to replace Jeff Brohm, who resigned on December 5, 2016, to become the head coach at Purdue. Sanford was a quarterback coach and an offensive coordinator at Notre Dame for two seasons. Sanford was hired on December 14, 2016.

Note: All stats shown are before the beginning of the season.

Team	Head coach	Years at school	Overall record	Record at school	CUSA record
Charlotte	Brad Lambert	5	16–30	16–30	3–13
FIU	Butch Davis	1	63–43	0–0	0–0
Florida Atlantic	Lane Kiffin	1	35–21	0–0	0–0
Louisiana Tech	Skip Holtz	5	119–93	31–22	22–10
Marshall	Doc Holliday	8	53–37	53–37	35–21
Middle Tennessee	Rick Stockstill	12	72–66	72–66	22–10
North Texas	Seth Littrell	2	5–8	5–8	3–5
Old Dominion	Bobby Wilder	9	67–30	67–30	14–10
Rice	David Bailiff	11	77–84	56–69	39–41
Southern Miss	Jay Hopson	2	39–23	7–6	4–4
UAB	Bill Clark	2	17–10	6–6	4–4
UTEP	Sean Kugler	5	18–31	18–31	11–21
UTSA	Frank Wilson	2	6–7	6–7	5–3
Western Kentucky	Mike Sanford Jr.	1	0–0	0–0	0–0

== Records against FBS conferences ==
Regular season

Power 5 conferences	Record
ACC	1–4
Big Ten	0–4
Big 12	1–2
Pac-12	0–2
SEC	0–7
Power 5 Total	2–19
Other FBS conferences	Record
American	2–4
Independents	3–2
MAC	4–3
Mountain West	0–0
Sun Belt	4–2
Other FBS Total	13–11
FCS Opponents	Record
Football Championship Subdivision	9–1
Total non-conference record	24–31

Post season

Other FBS conferences	Record
ACC	0–1
American	1–1
MAC	1–1
Mountain West	1–0
Sun Belt	1–2
Total bowl record	4–5

== Postseason ==
=== Postseason awards ===
- Most Valuable Player: Devin Singletary, RB, Florida Atlantic
- Offensive Player of the Year: Mason Fine, QB, North Texas
- Defensive Player of the Year: Marcus Davenport, DE, UTSA
- Special Teams Player of the Year: Isaiah Harper, KR, Old Dominion
- Coach of the Year: Bill Clark, UAB
- Freshman of the Year: Spencer Brown, RB, UAB
- Newcomer of the Year: Jalen Guyton, WR, sophomore, North Texas & Teddy Veal, WR, junior, Louisiana Tech

=== All-Conference Teams ===
Position	Player	Team
First Team Offense
QB	Mason Fine	North Texas
RB	Devin Singletary	Florida Atlantic
RB	Ito Smith	Southern Miss
WR	Thomas Owens	FIU
WR	Tyre Brady	Marshall
WR	Korey Robertson	Southern Miss
TE	Ryan Yurachek	Marshall
OL	Reggie Bain	Florida Atlantic
OL	Roman Fernandez	Florida Atlantic
OL	Antonyo Woods	Florida Atlantic
OL	Will Hernandez	UTEP
OL	Brandon Ray	Western Kentucky
First Team Defense
DL	Jaylon Ferguson	Louisiana Tech
DL	Oshane Ximines	Old Dominion
DL	Brian Womac	Rice
DL	Marcus Davenport	UTSA
LB	Azeez Al-Shaair	Florida Atlantic
LB	Emmanuel Ellerbee	Rice
LB	Joel Iyiegbuniwe	Western Kentucky
DB	Jalen Young	Florida Atlantic
DB	Shelton Lewis	Florida Atlantic
DB	Secdrick Cooper	Louisiana Tech
DB	Darious Williams	UAB
First Team Special Teams
P	Kaare Vedvik	Marshall
K	Parker Shaunfield	Southern Miss
KR	Isaiah Harper	Old Dominion
PR	Darrell Brown	Old Dominion
LS	Cameron Linck	Louisiana Tech

Position	Player	Team
Second Team Offense
QB	Mike White	Western Kentucky
RB	Jeffery Wilson	North Texas
RB	Spencer Brown	UAB
WR	Teddy Veal	Louisiana Tech
WR	Ty Lee	Middle Tennessee
WR	Jalen Guyton	North Texas
TE	Harrison Bryant	Florida Atlantic
OL	Jordan Budwig	FIU
OL	O'Shea Dugas	Louisiana Tech
OL	Levi Brown	Marshall
OL	Devin Farrior	Southern Miss
OL	Chris Schleuger	UAB
Second Team Defense
DL	Fermin Silva	FIU
DL	Ryan Bee	Marshall
DL	Xavier Thigpen	Southern Miss
DL	Kevin Strong	UTSA
LB	Anthony Wint	FIU
LB	Chase Hancock	Marshall
LB	Khalil Brooks	Middle Tennessee
DB	Brad Muhammad	FIU
DB	Amik Robertson	Louisiana Tech
DB	Malik Gant	Marshall
DB	Curtis Mikell	Southern Miss
Second Team Special Teams
P	Jack Fox	Rice
K	Trevor Moore	North Texas
KR	Keion Davis	Marshall
PR	Austin Trammell	Rice
LS	Matt Bayliss	UTSA

Position	Player	Team
Honorable Mention Offense
QB	Alex McGough	FIU
QB	Jason Driskel	Florida Atlantic
QB	Brent Stockstill	Middle Tennessee
QB	A. J. Erdely	UAB
RB	Alex Gardner	FIU
RB	Gregory Howell	Florida Atlantic
RB	Jarred Craft	Louisiana Tech
RB	Boston Scott	Louisiana Tech
RB	Ray Lawry	Old Dominion
WR	Rashid Bonnette	Louisiana Tech
WR	Marcel Williams	Marshall
WR	Michael Lawrence	North Texas
WR	Austin Walter	Rice
WR	Allenzae Staggers	Southern Miss
WR	Andre Wilson	UAB
WR	Nacarius Fant	Western Kentucky
WR	Lucky Jackson	Western Kentucky
TE	Pharoah McKever	FIU
TE	Kam McKnight	Louisiana Tech
TE	Deon Yelder	Western Kentucky
OL	Nate Davis	Charlotte
OL	Eugene German	Charlotte
OL	Joshua Outlaw	Louisiana Tech
OL	Ethan Reed	Louisiana Tech
OL	Robert Behanan	Middle Tennessee
OL	Chandler Brewer	Middle Tennessee
OL	T. J. Henson	North Texas
OL	Sosaia Mose	North Texas
OL	Jordan Murray	North Texas
OL	Elex Woodworth	North Texas
OL	Nick Clarke	Old Dominion
OL	Isaac Weaver	Old Dominion
OL	Calvin Anderson	Rice
OL	Trey Martin	Rice
OL	Drake Dorbeck	Southern Miss
OL	Arvin Fletcher	Southern Miss
OL	James Davis	UAB

=== Bowl games ===
Legend
CUSA win
CUSA loss

(Rankings from final CFP Poll; All times Eastern)

Date	Time	Bowl Game	Site	TV	CUSA Team	Opponent	Result
December 16, 2017	1:00 p.m.	New Orleans Bowl	Mercedes-Benz Superdome • New Orleans, LA	ESPN	North Texas	Troy	50–30
December 16, 2017	2:30 p.m.	AutoNation Cure Bowl	Camping World Stadium • Orlando, FL	CBSSN	Western Kentucky	Georgia State	27–17
December 16, 2017	4:30 p.m.	New Mexico Bowl	Dreamstyle Stadium • Albuquerque, NM	ESPN	Marshall	Colorado State	31–28
December 16, 2017	8:00 p.m.	Camellia Bowl	Cramton Bowl • Montgomery, AL	ESPN	Middle Tennessee	Arkansas State	35–30
December 19, 2017	7:00 p.m.	Boca Raton Bowl	FAU Stadium • Boca Raton, FL	ESPN	Florida Atlantic	Akron	50–3
December 20, 2017	7:00 p.m.	Frisco Bowl	Toyota Stadium • Frisco, TX	ESPN	Louisiana Tech	SMU	51–10
December 21, 2017	8:00 p.m.	Gasparilla Bowl	Tropicana Field • St. Petersburg, FL	ESPN	FIU	Temple	28–3
December 22, 2017	12:30 p.m.	Bahamas Bowl	Thomas Robinson Stadium • Nassau, Bahamas	ESPN	UAB	Ohio	41–6
December 27, 2017	1:30 p.m.	Independence Bowl	Independence Stadium • Shreveport, LA	ESPN	Southern Miss	Florida State	42–13

== Home game attendance ==
Team	Stadium	Capacity	Game 1	Game 2	Game 3	Game 4	Game 5	Game 6	Game 7	Total	Average	% of Capacity
Charlotte	Jerry Richardson Stadium	15,314	18,651	11,029	10,584	11,889	10,937	8,330	—	71,420	11,903	77.73%
FIU	FIU Stadium	20,000	5,017†	15,348	16,433	18,874	17,127	16,199	14,004	103,002	14,715	73.57%
Florida Atlantic	FAU Stadium	29,419	28,481	16,743	12,913	13,277	15,880	24,116	14,258 ‡	125,668	17,953	61.02%
Louisiana Tech	Joe Aillet Stadium	28,562	24,002	28,100	22,013	17,815	18,504	16,511	15,651	142,596	20,371	71.32%
Marshall	Joan C. Edwards Stadium	38,227	22,463	24,044	26,097	19,966	19,516	18,361		130,447	21,741	56.87%
Middle Tennessee	Johnny "Red" Floyd Stadium	30788	26717	16523	15527	13412	11411	10128	—	93,718	15,620	50.73%
North Texas	Apogee Stadium	30,850	19,592	20,142	23,068	18,872	26,108	26,392	—	134,174	22,362	72.49%
Old Dominion	Foreman Field	20,118	20,118	20,118	20,118	20,118	20,118	20,118	—	120,708	20,118	100.00%
Rice	Rice Stadium	47,000	18,932	21,766	19,992	18,124	17,956	—	—	96,770	19,354	41.18%
Southern Miss	M. M. Roberts Stadium	36,000	22,761	24,337	21,907	21,970	19,101	20,189	—	130,265	21,711	60.31%
UAB	Legion Field	71,594	45,212	21,789	27,213	25,309	21,224	12,505	—	153,252	25,542	35.68%
UTEP	Sun Bowl Stadium	51,500	19,136	22,133	20,418	19,456	16,597	—	—	97,740	19,548	37.96%
UTSA	Alamodome	65,000	25,093	23,517	25,270	20,076	20,148	—	—	114,104	22,821	35.11%
WKU	Houchens Industries–L. T. Smith Stadium	22,113	18,614	16,223	17,590	16,754	12,441	12,612	—	94,234	15,706	71.02%

†Played at Legion Field in Birmingham, AL

‡ Conference Championship Game
