= 2017 Charlotte 49ers football team =

American college football season

2017 Charlotte 49ers football
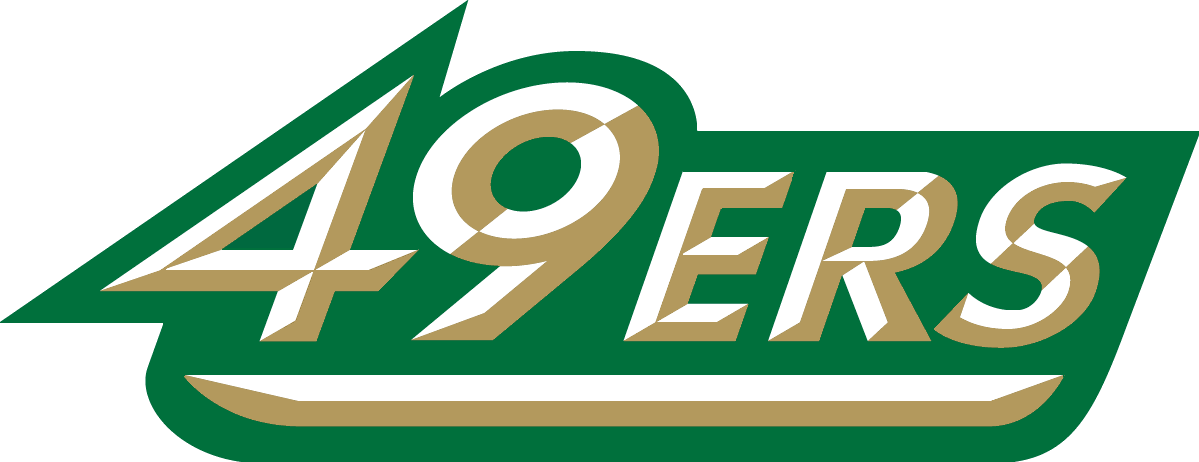
- Conference: Conference USA
- East Division
- Record: 1–11 (1–7 C-USA)
- Head coach: Brad Lambert (5th season)
- Offensive coordinator: Jeff Mullen (5th season; first 4 games); Greg Adkins (interim; remainder of season)
- Offensive scheme: Spread
- Defensive coordinator: Matt Wallerstedt (3rd season)
- Base defense: 3–4
- Home stadium: Jerry Richardson Stadium

2017 Conference USA football standings
	Conf.			Overall
Team	W		L	W		L
East Division
Florida Atlantic x$	8	–	0	11	–	3
FIU	5	–	3	8	–	5
Marshall	4	–	4	8	–	5
Middle Tennessee	4	–	4	7	–	6
Western Kentucky	4	–	4	6	–	7
Old Dominion	3	–	5	5	–	7
Charlotte	1	–	7	1	–	11
West Division
North Texas x	7	–	1	9	–	5
Southern Miss	6	–	2	8	–	5
UAB	6	–	2	8	–	5
Louisiana Tech	4	–	4	7	–	6
UTSA	3	–	5	6	–	5
Rice	1	–	7	1	–	11
UTEP	0	–	8	0	–	12
Championship: Florida Atlantic 41, North Texas 17
$ – Conference champion; x – Division champion/co-champions; Rankings from AP Poll

The 2017 Charlotte 49ers football team represented the University of North Carolina at Charlotte (also called Charlotte or UNC Charlotte) in the 2017 NCAA Division I FBS football season, the school's fifth season of NCAA football, their third season of NCAA Division I Football Bowl Subdivision (FBS) play, and their third season as a member of Conference USA's East Division. The team was led by fifth-year head coach Brad Lambert and played its home games on campus at Jerry Richardson Stadium in Charlotte, North Carolina. The 49ers finished the season 1–11, 1–7 in C-USA play to finish in last place in the East Division.

== Coaching staff ==
Tight Ends and Assistant head coach Dean Hood left the program in February to take over coaching Special Teams and Outside Linebackers for the Kentucky Wildcats. Recruiting coordinator and wide receivers coach Joe Tereshinski also resigned in February to pursue a non-football related career. Recruiting Coordinator responsibilities were transferred to Outside Linebackers Coach Ulrich Edmonds. Former Oklahoma State Offensive Line Coach Greg Adkins joined the staff in the same position in February. Previous Offensive Line Coach Johnson Richardson moved back to his former position as Tight Ends Coach. Catawba College Defensive coordinator and Assistant head coach Keith Henry joined the staff as Running Backs Coach. Previous Running Backs Coach Damien Gray moved to take over Wide Receivers. Defensive line coach Aaron Curry left the program in June to pursue a non-football related career. Charlie Skalaski, former Assistant head coach at Eastern Kentucky, was promoted to Special Teams Coordinator after having served on the Analytics Staff the previous season. Head Coach Brad Lambert will now directly coach the Defensive linemen.

Name	Position	Seasons at Charlotte	Alma mater
Brad Lambert	Head coach/Defensive line	5	Kansas State (1987)
Jeff Mullen	Offensive coordinator/quarterbacks	5	Wittenberg (1990)
Matt Wallerstedt	Defensive coordinator/Inside linebackers	3	Kansas State (1988)
James Adams	Secondary	5	Wake Forest (2006)
Greg Adkins	Offensive line	1	Marshall (1990)
Charlie Skalaski	Special teams	1	Florida (1978)
Ulrick Edmonds	Recruiting coordinator/Outside linebackers	2	James Madison (2001)
Damien Gary	Wide receivers	5	Georgia (2005)
Keith Henry	Running backs	1	Catawba College (1989)
Johnson Richardson	Tight ends	5	Wofford (2010)

== Recruiting ==
=== Recruiting class ===
The following recruits and transfers have signed letters of intent or verbally committed to the Charlotte 49ers football program for the 2017 recruiting year.

College recruiting information (2017)
Name	Hometown	School	Height	Weight	40^{‡}	Commit date
Michael Adams; DT	Summerville, GA	Chattooga	6 ft 3 in (1.91 m)	300 lb (140 kg)	–	Nov 6, 2016
Michael Adams; DT	Recruit ratings: Scout: Rivals: 247Sports:					
Jalen Allen; OL	Hutchinson, KS	Hutchinson CC	6 ft 3 in (1.91 m)	290 lb (130 kg)	–	Jan 31, 2017
Jalen Allen; OL	Recruit ratings: Scout: 247Sports:					
Cameron Bent; Athlete	Bluffton, SC	Bluffton	6 ft 0 in (1.83 m)	170 lb (77 kg)	–	Nov 14, 2016
Cameron Bent; Athlete	Recruit ratings: Scout: Rivals: 247Sports:					
Sean Bernard; LB	El Dorado, KS	Butler CC	6 ft 3 in (1.91 m)	235 lb (107 kg)	–	Dec 14, 2016
Sean Bernard; LB	Recruit ratings: Scout: Rivals: 247Sports:					
Cameron Dollar; WR	Denver, NC	East Lincoln	6 ft 2 in (1.88 m)	190 lb (86 kg)	–	Jun 21, 2016
Cameron Dollar; WR	Recruit ratings: Scout: Rivals: 247Sports:					
Kameron Duncan; RB	Ocala, FL	West Port	5 ft 10 in (1.78 m)	190 lb (86 kg)	–	Nov 27, 2016
Kameron Duncan; RB	Recruit ratings: Scout: Rivals: 247Sports:					
Ryan Eachus; TE	Costa Mesa, CA	Orange County CC	6 ft 3 in (1.91 m)	250 lb (110 kg)	–	Dec 13, 2016
Ryan Eachus; TE	Recruit ratings: Rivals: 247Sports:					
Jason Eason; OL	San Francisco, CA	City College of San Francisco	6 ft 3 in (1.91 m)	285 lb (129 kg)	–	Nov 19, 2016
Jason Eason; OL	Recruit ratings: Scout: Rivals: 247Sports:					
D'Mitri Emmanuel; OL	Waxhaw, NC	Marvin Ridge	6 ft 3 in (1.91 m)	290 lb (130 kg)	–	Sep 13, 2016
D'Mitri Emmanuel; OL	Recruit ratings: Scout: Rivals: 247Sports:					
David Foust; OL	Valley Glen, CA	Los Angeles Valley CC	6 ft 6 in (1.98 m)	270 lb (120 kg)	–	Dec 13, 2016
David Foust; OL	Recruit ratings: Rivals: 247Sports:					
Jonathan Francois; LB	Hialeah Gardens, FL	Mater Academy	6 ft 1 in (1.85 m)	225 lb (102 kg)	–	Jun 12, 2016
Jonathan Francois; LB	Recruit ratings: Scout: Rivals: 247Sports:					
Marquavis Gibbs; DB	Coffeyville, KS	Coffeyville CC	6 ft 1 in (1.85 m)	200 lb (91 kg)	–	Jul 27, 2016
Marquavis Gibbs; DB	Recruit ratings: Rivals: 247Sports:					
DeAnthony O'Neill; DE	Tallahassee, FL	Leon	6 ft 1 in (1.85 m)	225 lb (102 kg)	–	Apr 23, 2016
DeAnthony O'Neill; DE	Recruit ratings: Scout: Rivals: 247Sports:					
Chris Phillips; OL	Senatobia, MS	Northwest Mississippi CC	6 ft 5 in (1.96 m)	350 lb (160 kg)	–	Jan 29, 2017
Chris Phillips; OL	Recruit ratings: 247Sports:					
Mic Roof; QB	Buford, GA	Bufford	6 ft 2 in (1.88 m)	185 lb (84 kg)	–	Jan 23, 2017
Mic Roof; QB	Recruit ratings: Scout: Rivals: 247Sports:					
Henry Segura; DB	Tallahassee, FL	Leon	6 ft 2 in (1.88 m)	190 lb (86 kg)	–	Apr 23, 2016
Henry Segura; DB	Recruit ratings: Scout: Rivals: 247Sports:					
Antonie Shaw; TE	Rockingham, NC	Rockingham County	6 ft 4 in (1.93 m)	220 lb (100 kg)	–	Jan 31, 2017
Antonie Shaw; TE	Recruit ratings: Rivals: 247Sports:					
Mark Shekletski; OL	Ijamsville, MD	Urbana	6 ft 4 in (1.93 m)	295 lb (134 kg)	–	Aug 16, 2016
Mark Shekletski; OL	Recruit ratings: Scout: Rivals: 247Sports:					
Sherard Sutton; LB	Kannapolis, nC	A.L. Brown	6 ft 3 in (1.91 m)	225 lb (102 kg)	–	Jan 28, 2017
Sherard Sutton; LB	Recruit ratings: 247Sports:					
Victor Tucker; WR	Miami Gardens, FL	Carol City	5 ft 11 in (1.80 m)	170 lb (77 kg)	–	Jun 21, 2016
Victor Tucker; WR	Recruit ratings: Scout: Rivals: 247Sports:					
Jacob Webb; OL	Canton, GA	Creekview	6 ft 5 in (1.96 m)	225 lb (102 kg)	–	Jan 31, 2017
Jacob Webb; OL	Recruit ratings: Rivals: 247Sports:					
Chrishawn Wilson; DE	Florence, SC	West Florence	6 ft 6 in (1.98 m)	240 lb (110 kg)	–	Jan 21, 2017
Chrishawn Wilson; DE	Recruit ratings: Scout: Rivals: 247Sports:					
Overall recruit ranking: Scout: 111 Rivals: 97 247Sports: 113 ESPN: N/A
‡ Refers to 40-yard dash; Note: In many cases, Scout, Rivals, 247Sports, On3, and ESPN may conflict in their listings of height, weight and 40 time.; In these cases, the average was taken. ESPN grades are on a 100-point scale.; Sources: "Charlotte Football Commitments". Rivals.; "2017 Charlotte Football Commits". Scout.; "ESPN". ESPN.; "Scout.com Team Recruiting Rankings". Scout.; "2017 Team Ranking". Rivals.com.

== Players ==
=== Player gameday honors ===
Wearing Jersey #49	Position	Game	Game Captains
Darren Drake	Offensive lineman	Eastern Michigan	Tyriq Harris, Karrington King, Eugene German, Wolfgang Zacherl
Tommy Doctor	Defensive lineman	Kansas State	Nate Davis, Workpeh Kofa, Jeff Gemmell, Zach Duncan
Juwan Foggie	Linebacker	North Carolina A&T	Karrington King, Juwan Foggie, Uriah LeMay, R.J. Tyler
Arthur Hart	Punter	Georgia State	Zach Duncan, T.L. Ford II, Arthur Hart, Karrington King
Brain McDonough	Long Snapper	FIU	Eugene German, Juwan Foggie, Arthur Hart, Karrington King
Jaelin Fisher	Offensive lineman	Marshall	Tyriq Harris, Karrington King, Nate Davis, Trent Bostick
Tyler Fain	Defensive lineman	Western Kentucky	Karrington King, Tyler Fain, Eugene German, Uriah LeMay
Karrington King	Linebacker	UAB	R.J. Tyler, Trent Bostick, Zach Duncan, Juwan Foggie
Eugene German	Offensive lineman	Old Dominion	Tyriq Harris, Jeff Gemmell, Eugene German, R.J. Tyler
Anthony Butler	Linebacker	Middle Tennessee	Eugene German, Mark Quattlebaum, Juwan Foggie, Zach Duncan
Nate Davis	Offensive lineman	Southern Miss	Tyler Fain, Juwan Foggie, Mark Quattlebaum, Nate Davis
Markevis Davis	Linebacker	FAU	Markevis Davis, Eugene German, T.L. Ford II, Jeff Gemmell

=== Roster ===
2017 Charlotte 49ers football team roster
Players
Coaches
Offense

Pos.	#	Name	Class
WR	3	Mark Quattlebaum	RJr
WR	4	Chris Montgomery	Sr
WR	5	T.L. Ford II	Sr
WR	6	Workpeh Kofa	RJr
QB	7	Hasaan Klugh	RJr
WR	9	Uriah LeMay	RSr
QB	11	Mic Roof	Fr
QB	12	Brooks Barden	RJr
WR	13	Daniel Rose	RSo
QB	14	Joe Thompson	RFr
WR	16	Victor Tucker	Fr
QB	17	Chris Reynolds	Fr
WR	18	Cameron Dollar	Fr
WR	19	Cade Barnhill	Fr
WR	21	Brooks Cunningham	RSo
WR	22	Angel Marrero	Fr
RB	23	Kameron Duncan	Fr
WR	29	Calvin Camp	Fr
WR	30	DeQuondre Wilson	Fr
RB	38	Aaron McAllster	RFr
OL	51	Chris Brown	RJr
OL	53	Jalen Allen	Jr
OL	55	Jean Eason	Jr
OL	60	Darren Drake	Jr
OL	63	Jacob Webb	Fr
OL	64	Nate Davis	RJr
OL	68	Jaelin Fisher	RFr
OL	69	Luke Prevette	RSo
OL	70	D'Mitri Emmanuel	Fr
OL	71	Cameron Clark	RSo
OL	72	Jamar Winston	RJr
OL	73	David Foust	Jr
OL	75	Eugene German	RSr
OL	77	Wolfgang Zacherl	RSr
OL	78	Trevor Stacy	RSo
H-Back	80	Ben Jacques	RSo
WR	81	Trent Bostick	RSr
WR	82	Zach Gemmell	Fr
H-Back	84	Ryan Eachus	Jr
H-Back	85	Ryan Carriere	RFr
TE	86	Antonie Shaw	Fr
TE	87	Chris Phillips	Jr
H-Back	88	R.J. Tyler	RJr
WR	89	Chris Tomberlin	Jr
H-Back	90	Zane Tally	RJr

Defense

Pos.	#	Name	Class
DB	2	Ed Rolle	Jr
LB	8	Markevis Davis	Sr
LB	10	Tyriq Harris	RSo
DB	11	Quinton Jordan	Jr
DB	12	Alex Duncan	RJr
DL	13	Zach Duncan	RJr
DL	14	Michael Holmes	RSo
DB	15	Marquavis Gibbs	So
LB	16	Darius Irvin	RSo
LB	17	Anthony Butler	So
LB	21	Juwan Foggie	RJr
DB	22	J.T. Starr	RFr
DB	23	Anthony Covington	RSr
DB	24	Nafees Lyon	RSo
DB	25	Denzel Irvin	RJr
DB	26	Jacione Fugate	RFr
DB	27	Ben Bowbliss	Fr
DB	28	Ben DeLuca	So
LB	33	Garrison Duncan	RSr
LB	34	Jeff Gemmell	RSo
DB	36	Robert Cheatem	RFr
DB	37	Keshaun Woods	RFr
LB	39	George Maya	Fr
DB	41	A.J. McDonald	RSo
LB	42	Henry Segura	Fr
DB	43	Christian Haynes	RSo
LB	44	Code Bartrum	Fr
LB	45	Javonte Misenheimer	Fr
LB	46	Alex Highsmith	RSo
LB	48	Jonathan Francois	Fr
LB	50	Karrington King	RSr
LB	51	Christian Young	RSo
LB	52	Cam Darley	RJr
LB	54	Sherard Sutton	Fr
LB	56	William Graham	RFr
DL	58	Johnny Ray	RFr
DL	61	Ernest King	Fr
DL	62	Tyler Fain	RJr
DL	87	Isaiah Harris	RSo
DE	90	Tommy Doctor	RSo
DL	92	Nick Martin	RFr
LB	93	Stedman Lucas	Sr
LB	94	Javaris Jet	RFr
DL	95	Julian Wheaton	RSo
DL	96	Michael Adams	Fr
DL	98	Timmy Horne	RFr
DL	99	Jon Hardy	RSo

Special teams

Pos.	#	Name	Class
P	39	Kyle Corbett	RFr
P	40	Arthur Hart	Sr
P	43	Noah Brown	Fr
K	44	Nigel Macaulry	Jr
LS	47	Jack Wellenhofer	So
LS	54	Brian McDonough	RJr
K	95	Andrew Favaro	Fr

Head coach

- Brad Lambert (Kansas State)
  Special teams

Coordinators/assistant coaches

- Jeff Mullen (Wittenberg)
  Offensive coordinator/quarterbacks
- Matt Wallerstedt (Kansas State)
  Defensive coordinator/linebackers
- James Adams (Wake Forest)
  Secondary
- Greg Adkins (Wake Forest)
  Offensive line
- Ulrick Edmonds (James Madison)
  Outside linebackers/recruiting coordinator
- Damien Gary (Georgia)
  Receivers
- Keith Henry (Wofford)
  Running backs
- Johnson Richardson (Wofford)
  Tight ends
- Charlie Skalaski (Wofford)
  Special teams

Legend

- (C) Team captain
- (S) Suspended
- (I) Ineligible
- Injured
- Redshirt

Roster
Last update: December 3, 2018

=== Awards and honors ===
==== Preseason ====
Athlon Preseason All-C-USA Team
Player	Selection	Ref.
Nate Davis (RJR)	Second Team	
Ben DeLuca (SO)	Third Team	
T.L. Ford II (SR)	Fourth Team	

==== Post-season ====
2017 all-Conference USA Football Team
Player	Position	Selection	Ref.
Chris Montgomery (SR)	Kick returner	Honorable Mention	
Arthur Hart (SR)	Punter	Honorable Mention	
Nate Davis (RJR)	Offensive lineman	Honorable Mention	
Jeff Gemmell (RSR)	Linebacker	Honorable Mention	
Eugene German (RSR)	Offensive lineman	Honorable Mention	
Juwan Foggie (RJR)	Linebacker	Honorable Mention	
Ben DeLuca (SO)	Defensive back	Honorable Mention	

2017 Conference USA all-Academic Team
Player	Position	Ref.
Tyriq Harris (RSO)	Linebacker	

=== Depth chart ===
Defense

FS
Ben DeLuca
A.J. McDonald
⋅

WLB	ILB	ILB	SLB
JUWAN FOGGIE	JEFF GEMMELL	KARRINGTON KING	TYRIQ HARRIS
Markevis Davis	Cam Darley	Anthony Butler	Alex Highsmith
Darius Irvin	Garrison Duncan	Sean Bernard	Daris Irvin

SS
ED ROLLE
Quinton Jordan
⋅

CB
ANTHONY COVINGTON
Denzel Irvin
⋅

DE	NT	DE
ZACH DUNCAN	TYLER FAIN	JON HARDY
Nick Carroll	Timmy Horne	Tommy Doctor
Jaylen Miller	Steadman Lucas	Johnny Ray

CB
MARQUAVIS GIBBS
Robert Cheatem
⋅

Offense

WR
T.L. FORD II
Uriah LeMay
⋅

WR
R.J. TYLER
Ben Jacques
⋅

LT	LG	C	RG	RT
CHRIS BROWN	WOLFGANG ZACHERL	DARREN DRAKE	NATE DAVIS	EUGENE GERMAN
Cameron Clark	Jalen Allen	Jean Eason	Trevor Stacy	Jamar Winston
⋅	⋅	⋅	⋅	⋅

H-Back
MARK QUATTLEBAUM
Chris Montgomery
⋅

WR
TRENT BOSTICK
Workpeh Kofa
⋅

QB
HASAAN KLUGH
Brooks Barden
⋅

RB
BENNY LEMAY
Robert Washington
⋅

Special teams
PK Jackson Vansickle
PK Nigel Macauley
P Arthur Hart
KR Chris Montgomery
PR Nate Mullen
LS Brian McDonough
H Arthur Hart

== Schedule ==
Date	Time	Opponent	Site	TV	Result	Attendance
September 1	6:30 p.m.	at Eastern Michigan*	Rynearson Stadium; Ypsilanti, MI	ESPN3	L 7–24	12,823
September 9	12:00 p.m.	at No. 19 Kansas State*	Bill Snyder Family Stadium; Manhattan, KS	FSN	L 7–55	50,087
September 16	6:00 p.m.	No. 25 (FCS) North Carolina A&T*	Jerry Richardson Stadium; Charlotte, NC	7C	L 31–35	18,651
September 23	6:00 p.m.	Georgia State*	Jerry Richardson Stadium; Charlotte, NC	7C	L 0–28	11,029
September 30	7:00 p.m.	at FIU	Riccardo Silva Stadium; Miami, FL	beIN	L 29–30	15,348
October 7	6:00 p.m.	Marshall	Jerry Richardson Stadium; Charlotte, NC	7C	L 3–14	10,584
October 14	4:30 p.m.	at Western Kentucky	Houchens-Smith Stadium; Bowling Green, KY	FloSports	L 14–45	16,754
October 21	6:30 p.m.	UAB^{†}	Jerry Richardson Stadium; Charlotte, NC	beIN	W 25–24 ^{OT}	11,889
November 4	3:30 p.m.	at Old Dominion	Foreman Field; Norfolk, VA	ESPN3	L 0–6	20,118
November 11	2:00 p.m.	Middle Tennessee	Jerry Richardson Stadium; Charlotte, NC	ESPN3	L 21–35	10,937
November 18	3:00 p.m.	at Southern Miss	M.M. Roberts Stadium; Hattiesburg, MS		L 21–66	20,189
November 25	2:00 p.m.	Florida Atlantic	Jerry Richardson Stadium; Charlotte, NC	Stadium	L 12–31	8,330
*Non-conference game; ^{†}Homecoming; Rankings from AP Poll (FBS) or STATS Poll (FCS) released prior to game; All times are in Eastern time

Schedule Source:

== Television ==
Charlotte 49ers home games and conference road games will be broadcast through Conference USA's television partners ESPN, CBS Sports, Stadium, beIN, and Facebook Watch. Additional games will be available locally in the Charlotte TV market on WCCB.

== Radio ==
Radio coverage for all games is broadcast by IMG College through the Charlotte 49ers Radio Network flagship station WZGV ESPN Radio 730 AM The Game, and the TuneIn Charlotte 49ers IMG Sports Network app. The radio announcers are "Voice of the 49ers" Matt Swierad with play-by-play, former Carolina Panther Kevin Donnalley with color commentary, and Bobby Rosinski with sideline reports. Swierad and Donnalley also host the "Gold Mine Live" Coaches Show each Monday during the season at noon from Norm's in the UNC Charlotte Student Union. "Gold Mine Live" can be heard on Mondays.

== Preseason media poll ==
Conference USA released their preseason media poll on July 19, 2017, with the 49ers predicted to finish in last place in the East Division.

East Division
Predicted finish	Team
1	Western Kentucky
2	Middle Tennessee
3	Old Dominion
4	Marshall
5	Florida Atlantic
6	FIU
7	Charlotte

== Game summaries ==
=== Eastern Michigan Eagles ===
Charlotte at Eastern Michigan

Team	1	2	3	4	Total
49ers	7	0	0	0	7
• Eagles	14	3	7	0	24

- Date: September 1
- Location: Rynearson Stadium
  Ypsilanti, MI
- Game start: 6:35 pm EDT
- Elapsed time: 3:12
- Game attendance: 12,823
- Game weather: 66°F, Sunny, 10 mph ENE
- Referee: Ron Hudson
- TV announcers (ESPN3): Dan Gutowsky, Mark Herrmann

Scoring summary
1	9:44	EMU	Brody HOYING 35 Yd Interception Return (Paul FRICANO Kick)	EMU 7–0
1	8:03	CHAR	Trent BOSTICK 21 Yd pass from Hasaan KLUGH (Nigel MACAULEY Kick)	TIED 7–7
1	2:35	EMU	Ian ERIKSEN 2 Yd Run (Paul FRICANO Kick)	EMU 14–7
2	2:02	EMU	Paul FRICANO 32 Yd Field Goal	EMU 17–7
3	3:58	EMU	Ian ERIKSEN 5 Yd Run (Paul FRICANO Kick)	EMU 24–7

The 49ers were looking to avenge a home loss from the previous season as they visited the State of Michigan for the first time, but eleven costly penalties and three turnovers doomed the 49ers' efforts.

Top performers for the game were Eastern Michigan quarterback Brogan Roback, who passed for 267 yards and an interception. Charlotte quarterback Hasaan Klugh also was the top rusher of the game, with 14 carries for 101 yards in addition to passing for 114 yards, with a touchdown and an interception. Charlotte's Trent Bostick had 3 receptions for 34 yards and a touchdown.

Game notes:

- First game in the State of Michigan in program history.

=== Kansas State Wildcats ===
Charlotte at Kansas State

Team	1	2	3	4	Total
49ers	7	0	0	0	7
• Wildcats	21	17	10	7	55

- Date: September 9
- Location: Bill Snyder Family Stadium
  Manhattan, KS
- Game start: 11:05 am CDT
- Elapsed time: 3:23
- Game attendance: 50,807
- Game weather: 75°F, Mostly Clear, 16 mph SSE
- Referee: Eddy Shelton
- TV announcers (FSN): Ron Thulin, Gary Reasons

Scoring summary
1	9:22	KSST	Winston DIMEL 5 Yd Run (Matthew McCrane Kick)	KSST 7–0
1	5:21	KSST	Jesse ERTZ 35 Yd Run (Matthew MCCRANE Kick)	KSST 14–0
1	3:58	KSST	Kendall ADAMS 30 Yd Interception Return (Matthew MCCRANE Kick)	KSST 21–0
1	2:17	CHAR	Hasaan KLUGH 19 Yd Run (Nigel MACAULEY Kick)	KSST 21–7
2	8:13	KSST	Matthew MCCRANE 22 Yd Field Goal	KSST 24–7
2	4:18	KSST	Kendall ADAMS 46 Yd Fumble Return (Matthew MCCRANE Kick)	KSST 31–7
2	0:07	KSST	Alex BARNES 4 Yd Run (Matthew MCCRANE Kick)	KSST 38–7
3	11:13	KSST	Dalvin WARMACK 13 Yd Run (Matthew MCCRANE Kick)	KSST 45–7
3	0:39	KSST	Matthew MCCRANE 24 Yd Field Goal	KSST 48–7
4	8:12	KSST	Mike MCCOY 15 Yd Run (Nick MCLELLAN Kick)	KSST 55–7

Brad Lambert brought his 49ers into the State of Kansas for the first time to take on his Alma Mater. It would prove to be a long afternoon for the 49ers as the #19 team in the country put on a scoring clinic in front of the home crowd.

Top performers for the game were Kansas State quarterback Jesse Ertz, who passed for 178 yards. Kansas State rusher Alex Barnes had 16 carries for 99 yards and a touchdown. Kansas State's Isaiah Zuber had 7 receptions for 73 yards.

Game notes:

- First game in the State of Kansas in program history.
- First Big 12 opponent in program history.
- Lambert played four seasons as a defensive back for the Kansas State Wildcats, earning all Big 8 honors his senior season.

=== North Carolina A&T Aggies ===
N.C. A&T at Charlotte

Team	1	2	3	4	Total
• Aggies	14	7	7	7	35
49ers	7	3	7	14	31

- Date: September 16
- Location: Jerry Richardson Stadium
  Charlotte, NC
- Game start: 6:06 pm EDT
- Elapsed time: 3:32
- Game attendance: 18,651
- Game weather: 83°F, Partly Cloudy, 5 mph NNW
- Referee: Jonathan Noli
- TV announcers (WCCB): Bobby Rosinski, Al Wallace, Libby Weihsmann

Scoring summary
1	13:26	CHAR	Hasaan KLUGH 14 Yd Run (Nigel MACAULEY Kick)	CHAR 7–0
1	7:50	NCAT	Malik WILSON 17 Yd pass from Lamar RAYNARD (Noel RUIZ Kick)	TIED 7–7
1	3:31	NCAT	Jaquil CAPEL 1 Yd Run (Noel RUIZ Kick)	NCAT 14–7
2	14:25	NCAT	Marquell CARTWRIGHT 9 Yd Run (Noel RUIZ Kick)	NCAT 21–7
2	8:14	CHAR	Nigel MACAULEY 22 Yd Field Goal	NCAT 21–10
3	9:33	NCAT	Marquell CARTWRIGHT 1 Yd Run (Noel RUIZ Kick)	NCAT 28–10
3	0:00	CHAR	T.L. FORD II 29 Yd pass from Hasaan KLUGH (Nigel MACAULEY Kick)	NCAT 28–17
4	6:12	CHAR	R.J. TYLER 4 Yd pass from Hasaan KLUGH (Hasaan KLUGH Pass to Chris MONTGOMERY for Two-Point Conversion)	NCAT 28–25
4	0:24	NCAT	Franklin MCCAIN III 74 Yd Interception Return (Noel RUIZ Kick)	NCAT 35–25
4	0:08	CHAR	Workpeh KOFA 44 Yd pass from Hasaan KLUGH (Nigel MACAULEY PAT failed)	NCAT 35–31

The 49ers opened the home slate with a game against in-state opponent N.C. A&T. The 49ers were favored to win but the Aggies got up on them early and held off a 4th quarter rally to win the game.

Top performers for the game were Charlotte quarterback Hassan Klugh, who passed for 170 yards, 3 touchdowns, and 2 interceptions. A&T rusher Marquell Cartwright had 17 carries for 66 yards and 2 touchdowns. Charlotte's Workpeh Kofa had 6 receptions for 110 yards and a touchdown.

Game notes:

- First home loss to a FCS opponent since the program moved to FBS in 2015.

=== Georgia State Panthers ===
Georgia State at Charlotte

Team	1	2	3	4	Total
• Panthers	0	14	0	14	28
49ers	0	0	0	0	0

- Date: September 23
- Location: Jerry Richardson Stadium
  Charlotte, NC
- Game start: 6:06 pm EDT
- Elapsed time: 2:50
- Game attendance: 11,029
- Game weather: 88°F, Fair, 4 mph SE
- Referee: Steve Lamentia
- TV announcers (WCCB): Bobby Rosinski, Damione Lewis, Libby Weihsmann

Scoring summary
2	12:29		Glenn SMITH 3 Yd Run (Brandon Wright Kick)	GAST 7–0
2	0:44	GAST	Penny Hart 32 Yd pass from Conner MANNING (Brandon WRIGHT Kick)	GAST 14–0
4	14:10	GAST	Shamarious GILMORE 0 Yd Fumble Return (Brandon WRIGHT Kick)	GAST 21–0
4	0:22	GAST	Glenn SMITH 1 Yd Run (Brandon WRIGHT Kick)	GAST 28–0

In 2015, the 49ers played their first ever FBS game against the Panthers in the Georgia Dome, holding off a late Panthers' rally to mark the first FBS win in program history. The Panthers were looking to avenge that loss while the 49ers were looking to recover from a disappointing loss the previous week. The 49ers never found an offensive rhythm and failed to score during the game, recording the first team shutout in program history.

Georgia State also dominated the top performances of the game. Quarterback Conner Manning threw for 250 yards and a touchdown. Glenn Smith rushed for 90 yards on 31 carries, resulting in 2 touchdowns. Penny Hart had 11 receptions for 141 yards and a touchdown.

Game notes:

- First team shutout in program history.
- Post-game, offensive coordinator Jeff Mullen would be replaced in that position by Greg Adkins for the rest of the season.

=== FIU Panthers ===
Charlotte at FIU

Team	1	2	3	4	Total
49ers	12	14	3	0	29
• Panthers	7	7	7	9	30

- Date: September 30
- Location: Riccardo Silva Stadium
  Miami, FL
- Game start: 7:04 pm EDT
- Elapsed time: 3:10
- Game attendance: 15,348
- Game weather: 87°F, Partly Cloudy, 10 mph ESE
- Referee: D. Gutreaux
- TV announcers (beIN): Mike Gleason, Donovan McNabb, Michelle Gingras

Scoring summary
1	12:27	CHAR	Hasaan KLUGH 3 Yd Run (Two-Point Pass Conversion Failed)	CHAR 6–0
1	8:42	CHAR	Benny LEMAY 3 Yd pass from Hasaan KLUGH (Jackson VANSICKLE PAT failed)	CHAR 12–0
1	6:11	FIU	Julian WILLIAMS 35 Yd pass from Thomas OWENS (José Borregales Kick)	CHAR 12–7
2	12:59	CHAR	Hasaan KLUGH 23 Yd Run (Jackson VANSICKLE Kick)	CHAR 19–7
2	2:51	CHAR	Hasaan KLUGH 8 Yd Run (Jackson VANSICKLE Kick)	CHAR 26–7
2	0:43	FIU	Thomas OWENS 6 Yd pass from Alex McGough (José BORREGALES Kick)	CHAR 26–14
3	7:57	CHAR	Jackson VANSICKLE 39 Yd Field Goal	CHAR 29–14
3	5:40	FIU	Alex MCGOUGH 8 Yd Run (José BORREGALES Kick)	CHAR 29–21
4	12:43	FIU	Alex MCGOUGH 14 Yd Run (Two-Point Pass Conversion Failed)	CHAR 29–27
4	7:22	FIU	José BORREGALES 27 Yd Field Goal	FIU 30–29

The Panthers ruined the 49ers' chance for their first ever Homecoming win when a late score gave them a one point victory. In their conference opener, the 49ers were looking for payback and would dominate the scoring into the second half, but would find the endzone elusive after that. FIU Would get within 2 points and take the go ahead field goal to make it a 1 point game and hold on to win.

Top performers of the game were Charlotte Quarterback Hasaan Klugh, who passed for 155 yards and a touchdown. Charlotte's Benny LeMay had 22 carries for 178 yards. Florida International's Trent Owens had 7 receptions for 101 yards and a touchdown.

Game notes:

- 49ers' second consecutive loss to FIU by 1 point.

=== Marshall Thundering Herd ===
Marshall at Charlotte

Team	1	2	3	4	Total
• Thundering Herd	7	0	7	0	14
49ers	0	0	3	0	3

- Date: October 7
- Location: Jerry Richardson Stadium
  Charlotte, NC
- Game start: 6:06 pm EDT
- Elapsed time: 2:56
- Game attendance: 10,587
- Game weather: 71°F, Rain, 0 mph
- Referee: Jay Edwards
- TV announcers (WCCB): Bobby Rosinski, Damione Lewis, Stormy Buonantony

Scoring summary
1	6:25	MARSH	Tyre BRADY 37 Yd pass from Chase Litton (Kaare Vedvik Kick)	MARSH 7–0
3	9:14	MARSH	Tyre BRADY 11 Yd pass from Chase LITTON (Kaare VEDVIK Kick)	MARSH 14–0
3	5:20	Char	Nigel MACAULEY 30 Yd Field Goal	MARSH 14–3

The 49ers stunned the Thundering Herd in 2016 by winning their first game ever played inside Joan C. Edwards Stadium. Marshall came into town looking for revenge and would find it in a defense struggle which saw the 49ers avoid a second program shutout on a fourth quarter field goal.

Top performances were all from Marshall in this game. Quarterback Chase Litton, who threw for 192 yards and two touchdowns. Rusher Keion Davis had 23 carries for 122 yards. Tyre Brady had 6 receptions for 88 yards and two touchdowns.

Game notes:

- In 2016 Charlotte became the first team in Conference USA history to beat both Marshall and Southern Miss on the road in the same season.

=== Western Kentucky Hilltoppers ===
Charlotte at WKU

Team	1	2	3	4	Total
49ers	7	7	0	0	14
• Hilltoppers	14	24	0	7	45

- Date: October 14
- Location: Houchens-Smith Stadium
  Bowling Green, KY
- Game start: 3:30 pm CDT
- Elapsed time: 3:14
- Game attendance: 16,754
- Game weather: 83°F, Partly Cloudy, 8 mph S
- Referee: Jonathan Noli
- TV announcers (FloFootball.com): Joe Brunk, Billy Rutledge

Scoring summary
1	9:00	WKU	Deon Yelder 8 Yd pass from Mike White (Ryan NUSS Kick)	WKU 7–0
1	3:49	CHAR	Aaron MCALLISTER 9 Yd Run (Jackson VANSICKLE Kick)	TIED 7–7
1	1:52	WKU	Kylen TOWNER 59 Yd pass from Mike WHITE (Ryan NUSS Kick)	WKU 14–7
2	11:52	WKU	Mike WHITE 2 Yd Run (Ryan NUSS Kick)	WKU 21–7
2	10:57	CHAR	Aaron MCALLISTER 89 Yd Run (Jackson VANSICKLE Kick)	WKU 21–14
2	8:46	WKU	Mik'Quan DEANE 20 Yd pass from Mike WHITE (Ryan NUSS Kick)	WKU 28–14
2	8:07	WKU	Ryan NUSS 43 Yd Field Goal	WKU 31–14
2	0:39	WKU	Nacarius FANT 13 Yd pass from Mike WHITE (Ryan NUSS Kick)	WKU 38–14
4	14:53	WKU	Jacquez SLOAN 39 Yd pass from Mike WHITE (Ryan NUSS Kick)	WKU 45–14

Despite being in the same conference and same division for the two previous years, these two teams had yet to play each other before this game. Charlotte visited Bowling Green, Kentucky for the first time to face the two time defending Conference USA Football Champions on their home field. The game was competitive going into the 2nd quarter, but WKU would add two more touchdowns and a field goal before halftime. A final WKU touchdown early in the fourth quarter would be the final score of a resounding victory for the Hilltoppers.

Top performers of the game were Western Kentucky Quarterback Mike White, who passed for 398 yards and an impressive five touchdowns. Charlotte's Aaron McAllister had 22 carries for 157 yards and two touchdowns. The Hilltopper's Kylen Towner had 6 receptions for 111 yards and a touchdown.

Game notes:

- First meeting of these two programs.
- First time Charlotte faced a C-USA football champion.
- Stretching back to the previous season the 49ers had the longest FBS losing streak at 10 games.

=== UAB Blazers ===
UAB at Charlotte

Team	1	2	3	4	OT	Total
Blazers	0	14	3	0	7	24
• 49ers	0	0	7	10	8	25

- Date: October 7
- Location: Jerry Richardson Stadium
  Charlotte, NC
- Game start: 6:34 pm EDT
- Elapsed time: 3:15
- Game attendance: 11,889
- Game weather: 76°F, Partly Cloudy, 0 mph
- Referee: Dan Gautreaux
- TV announcers (beIN): Mike Gleason, Brett Romberg, Michelle Gingras

Scoring summary
2	13:15	UAB	Hayden PITTMAN 12 Yd pass from A.J. ERDELY (Nick VOGEL Kick)	UAB 7–0
2	2:20	UAB	A.J. ERDELY 3 Yd Run (Nick VOGEL Kick)	UAB 14–0
3	10:25	UAB	Nick VOGEL 25 Yd Field Goal	UAB 17–0
3	3:16	CHAR	Hasaan KLUGH 9 Yd Run (Nigel MACAULEY Kick)	UAB 17–7
4	10:34	CHAR	Trent Bostick 68 Yd pass from Hasaan KLUGH (Nigel MACAULEY Kick)	UAB 17–14
4	6:27	CHAR	Nigel MACAULEY 24 Yd Field Goal	TIED 17–17
OT	0:00	UAB	A.J. ERDELY 1 Yd Run (Nick VOGEL Kick)	UAB 24–17
OT	0:00	CHAR	Hasaan KLUGH 1 Yd Run (Chris MONTGOMERY Pass to Hasaan KLUGH for Two-Point Conversion)	CHAR 25–24

After the drama that resulted in a two year hiatus from playing football, UAB was back on the gridiron and facing the 49ers for the first time. After a scoreless first quarter the Blazers took a two touchdown lead into the half. After the Blazers added a field goal early in the third quarter, they would not score again in regulation. Charlotte would do all the scoring left in regulation and tie the Blazers, forcing the 49ers' first overtime of the year. In the overtime period the Blazers would find the endzone first but the 49ers would match them. Seeking to get the program's first win of a frustrating year, Coach Lambert would go for two for the win; and after running in the matching touchdown Quarterback Hasaan Klugh would get the call again as he hauled in the game winning pass from Chris Montgomery to give the Niners' program its only win of the season and first ever Homecoming victory.

Top performers of the game were UAB Quarterback A. J. Erdely, who passed for 182 yards and a touchdown. Charlotte Quarterback Hasaan Klugh would be the team's top rusher with 25 carries for 1449ers yards and two touchdowns. The 49ers' Trent Bostick hauled in just 2 receptions which yielded an impressive 70 yards and a touchdown.

Game notes:

- First meeting between these two conference mates
- First Homecoming victory in program history.
- The win broke Charlotte's FBS 10 game losing streak.

=== Old Dominion Monarchs ===
Charlotte at Old Dominion

Team	1	2	3	4	Total
49ers	0	0	0	0	0
• Monarchs	3	0	3	0	6

- Date: November 4
- Location: Foreman Field
  Norfolk, VA
- Game start: 3:30 pm EDT
- Elapsed time: 2:49
- Game attendance: 20,118
- Game weather: 64°F, Cloudy, 10 mph NE
- Referee: Justin Elliott
- TV announcers (ESPN3): Ted Alexander, Andy Mashaw, Doug Ripley

Scoring summary
1	4:56	ODU	Nick RICE 40 Yd Field Goal	ODU 3–0
3	5:03	ODU	Nick RICE 30 Yd Field Goal	ODU 6–0

The Monarchs rolled over the 49ers in Charlotte the previous season. Charlotte was looking to return the favor at Foreman Field, but both teams offenses struggled with neither ever finding the endzone. Unlike the 49ers, the Monarchs did find the goal posts, twice; to preserve the low score victory.

Top performers of the game were Old Dominion Quarterback Steven Williams, who passed for 153 yards. ODU's Ray Lawry had 25 carries for 98 yards. Charlotte's Mark Quattlebaum and ODU's Travis Fulgham had virtually identical stats with 4 receptions each with Fulgham having 1 yard more for 47 yards.

Game notes:

- 3rd straight loss to ODU.

=== Middle Tennessee Blue Raiders ===
Middle Tennessee at Charlotte

Team	1	2	3	4	Total
• Blue Raiders	14	14	0	7	35
49ers	7	0	7	7	21

- Date: November 11
- Location: Jerry Richardson Stadium
  Charlotte, NC
- Game start: 2:05 pm EST
- Elapsed time: 3:11
- Game attendance: 10,937
- Game weather: 45°F, Sunny, 5 mph ESE
- Referee: Rodney Burnette
- TV announcers (ESPN3): Bobby Rosinski, Damione Lewis

Scoring summary
1	11:28	CHAR	Benny LEMAY 16 Yd Run (Nigel MACAULEY Kick)	CHAR
1	4:25	MTSU	Tavares THOMAS 2 Yd Run (Canon ROOKER Kick)	TIED 7–7
1	0:51	MTSU	Tavares THOMAS 4 Yd Run (Canon ROOKER Kick)	MTSU 14–7
2	12:23	MTSU	Ty WATKINS 6 Yd pass from Brent Stockstill (Canon ROOKER Kick)	MTSU 21–7
2	6:47	MTSU	Ty LEE 63 Yd pass from Brent STOCKSTILL (Canon ROOKER Kick)	MTSU 28–7
3	12:05	CHAR	Mark QUATTLEBAUM 3 Yd pass from Hasaan KLUGH (Kyle CORBETT Kick)	MTSU 28–14
4	7:17	MTSU	Patrick SMITH 4 Yd pass from Brent STOCKSTILL (Canon ROOKER Kick)	MTSU 35–14
4	2:59	CHAR	Trent BOSTICK 26 Yd pass from Hasaan KLUGH (Kyle CORBETT Kick)	MTSU 35–21

In 2016 Middle Tennessee pulled off a close win at Jerry Richardson Stadium. They had to return to Jerry Richardson Stadium for a second year in a row, but the 49ers couldn't get revenge or their first win against the Blue Raiders.

Top performers of the game were Middle Tennessee Quarterback Brent Stockstil, who passed for 255 yards and three touchdowns. The Blue Raiders' Tavares Thomas had 29 carries for 195 yards and two touchdowns. Charlotte's Mark Quattlebaum had 7 receptions for 94 yards and a touchdown.

Game notes:

- Third consecutive loss to Middle Tennessee.

=== Southern Miss Golden Eagles ===
Charlotte at Southern Miss

Team	1	2	3	4	Total
49ers	0	7	7	7	21
• Golden Eagles	13	25	14	14	66

- Date: November 18
- Location: M.M. Roberts Stadium
  Hattiesburg, MS
- Game start: 2:06 pm CST
- Elapsed time: 3:03
- Game attendance: 20,189
- Game weather: 76F, Cloudy, 15 mph SW
- Referee: Ken Antee
- Television network: none

Scoring summary
1	10:20	USM	Parker SHAUNFIELD 23 Yd Field Goal	USM 3–0
1	7:29	USM	Kelsey DOUGLAS 52 Yd Interception Return (Parker SHAUNFIELD Kick)	USM 10–0
1	3:15	USM	Parker SHAUNFIELD 30 Yd Field Goal	USM 13–0
2	12:00	USM	Ito Smith 1 Yd Run (Parker SHAUNFIELD Kick)	USM 20–0
2	10:38	USM	Kelsey DOUGLAS 48 Yd Interception Return (Parker SHAUNFIELD Kick)	USM 27–0
2	10:00	CHAR	Benny LEMAY 11 Yd Run (Kyle CORBETT Kick)	USM 27–7
2	3:34	USM	Ito SMITH 3 Yd Run (Kwadra GRIGGS Pass to Korey Robertson for Two-Point Conversion)	USM 35–7
2	0:00	USM	Parker SHAUNFIELD 21 Yd Field Go	USM 38–7
3	12:06	USM	Korey ROBERTSON 45 Yd pass from Kwadra GRIGGS (Parker SHAUNFIELD Kick)	USM 45–7
3	8:48	USM	Ito SMITH 80 Yd Run (Parker SHAUNFIELD Kick)	USM 52–7
3	4:52	CHAR	Hasaan KLUGH 10 Yd Run (Kyle CORBETT Kick)	USM 52–14
4	8:43	USM	Tez PARKS 2 Yd Run (Parker SHAUNFIELD Kick)	USM 59–14
4	4:17	CHAR	T.L. FORD II 19 Yd pass from Hasaan KLUGH (Kyle CORBETT Kick)	USM 59–21
4	2:35	USM	T'Rod DANIELS 53 Yd Run (Parker SHAUNFIELD Kick)	USM 66–21

The 49ers pulled off a shocking drubbing of the Golden Eagles on the road the previous season. Charlotte had to return to Hattiesburg for the second year in a row and it was clear by the midway point that the game's outcome wasn't in doubt, and that the Golden Eagles were looking to make a statement. Turnovers also proved detrimental to any 49er comeback attempt.

Southern Miss dominated the top performances. Quarterback Kwadra Griggs passed for 221 yards and a touchdown. Rusher Ito Smith had 15 carries for 153 yards and three touchdowns. The Golden Eagles Korey Robertson had 6 receptions for 91 yards and a touchdown. Charlotte quarterback Hasaan Klugh again was the 49ers' top rusher with 7 carries for 56 yards and a touchdown. He also had 96 passing yards for another touchdown and two interceptions.

Game notes:

- In 2016 Charlotte became the first team in Conference USA history to beat both Marshall and Southern Miss on the road in the same season.

=== Florida Atlantic Owls ===
Florida Atlantic at Charlotte

Team	1	2	3	4	Total
• Owls	10	14	7	0	31
49ers	0	6	6	0	12

- Date: October 7
- Location: Jerry Richardson Stadium
  Charlotte, NC
- Game start: 2:06 pm EST
- Elapsed time: 2:34
- Game attendance: 8,330
- Game weather: 60F, Partly Cloudy, 0 mph
- Referee: Justin Elliott
- TV announcers (Stadium for Facebook): Damon Amendolara, Geoff Schwartz, Shae Peppler

Scoring summary
1	9:48	FAU	Devin Singletary 6 Yd Run (Greg Joseph Kick)	FAU 7–0
1	4:11	FAU	Greg JOSEPH 37 Yd Field Goal	FAU 10–0
2	8:48	FAU	Kamrin SOLOMAN 20 Yd pass from Jason DRISKEL (Greg JOSEPH Kick)	FAU 17–0
2	5:49	CHAR	Benny LEMAY 28 Yd pass from Hasaan KLUGH (Kyle CORBETT PAT failed)	FAU 17–6
2	1:00	FAU	Willie WRIGHT 41 Yd pass from Jason DRISKEL (Greg JOSEPH Kick)	FAU 24–6
3	10:02	FAU	Devin SINGLETARY 1 Yd Run (Greg JOSEPH Kick)	FAU 31–6
3	1:48	CHAR	Hasaan KLUGH 6 Yd Run (Two-Point Run Conversion Failed)	FAU 31–12

Charlotte garnered their first ever C-USA win after a dramatic last second endzone catch was waved off for the Owls in Boca Raton the previous season. The Owls easily erased that mark on their record on their way to the 2018 C-USA Championship Game and their first C-USA title.

The eventual conference champions dominated the offensive stats. Quarterback Jason Driskel passed for 245 yards and two touchdowns. Rusher Devin Singletary had 108 yards and two touchdowns. Willie Wright had 9 receptions for 103 yards and a touchdown.

Game notes:

- First time Charlotte will host a final weekend regular season game in FBS.

== Attendance ==
Season	Games	Sellouts	W–L (%)	Attendance	Average	Best
2017	6	1	1–5 (.167)	71,420	11,903	18,651
