= 2017 Southern Miss Golden Eagles football team =

American college football season

2017 Southern Miss Golden Eagles football

Independence Bowl, L 13–42 vs. Florida State
- Conference: Conference USA
- West Division
- Record: 8–5 (6–2 C-USA)
- Head coach: Jay Hopson (2nd season)
- Offensive coordinator: Shannon Dawson (2nd season)
- Offensive scheme: Spread
- Defensive coordinator: Tony Pecoraro (2nd season)
- Base defense: 4–3
- Home stadium: M. M. Roberts Stadium

2017 Conference USA football standings
	Conf.			Overall
Team	W		L	W		L
East Division
Florida Atlantic x$	8	–	0	11	–	3
FIU	5	–	3	8	–	5
Marshall	4	–	4	8	–	5
Middle Tennessee	4	–	4	7	–	6
Western Kentucky	4	–	4	6	–	7
Old Dominion	3	–	5	5	–	7
Charlotte	1	–	7	1	–	11
West Division
North Texas x	7	–	1	9	–	5
Southern Miss	6	–	2	8	–	5
UAB	6	–	2	8	–	5
Louisiana Tech	4	–	4	7	–	6
UTSA	3	–	5	6	–	5
Rice	1	–	7	1	–	11
UTEP	0	–	8	0	–	12
Championship: Florida Atlantic 41, North Texas 17
$ – Conference champion; x – Division champion/co-champions; Rankings from AP Poll

The 2017 Southern Miss Golden Eagles football team represented the University of Southern Mississippi in the 2017 NCAA Division I FBS football season. The Golden Eagles played their home games at the M. M. Roberts Stadium in Hattiesburg, Mississippi and competed in the West Division of Conference USA (C–USA). They were led by second-year head coach Jay Hopson. They finished the season 8–5, 6–2 in C-USA play to finish in a tie for second place in the West Division. They were invited to the Independence Bowl where they lost to Florida State.

== Schedule ==
Southern Miss announced its 2017 football schedule on January 26, 2017. The 2017 schedule consists of 6 home and away games in the regular season. The Golden Eagles will host C–USA foes North Texas, UTEP, UAB, and Charlotte, and will travel to UTSA, Louisiana Tech, Rice, and Marshall.

The team will play four non–conference games, two home games against Kentucky from the Southeastern Conference (SEC) and Southern from the Southwestern Athletic Conference, and two road games against ULM from the Sun Belt Conference and Tennessee who is also from the Southeastern Conference.

Date	Time	Opponent	Site	TV	Result	Attendance
September 2	3:00 p.m.	Kentucky*	M. M. Roberts Stadium; Hattiesburg, MS	CBSSN	L 17–24	22,761
September 9	6:00 p.m.	Southern*	M. M. Roberts Stadium; Hattiesburg, MS	Stadium	W 45–0	24,337
September 16	6:00 p.m.	at Louisiana–Monroe*	Malone Stadium; Monroe, LA	ESPN3	W 28–17	11,061
September 30	6:00 p.m.	North Texas	M. M. Roberts Stadium; Hattiesburg, MS	CUSA.TV	L 28–43	21,907
October 7	6:00 p.m.	at UTSA	Alamodome; San Antonio, TX	Stadium	W 31–29	23,517
October 14	6:00 p.m.	UTEP^{†}	M. M. Roberts Stadium; Hattiesburg, MS	Stadium	W 24–0	21,970
October 21	6:00 p.m.	at Louisiana Tech	Joe Aillet Stadium; Ruston, LA (Rivalry in Dixie)	Stadium	W 34–27 ^{2OT}	17,815
October 28	6:00 p.m.	UAB	M. M. Roberts Stadium; Hattiesburg, MS	CUSA.TV	L 12–30	19,101
November 4	6:30 p.m.	at Tennessee*	Neyland Stadium; Knoxville, TN	SECN	L 10–24	95,551
November 11	2:30 p.m.	at Rice	Rice Stadium; Houston, TX	Stadium	W 43–34	18,124
November 18	2:00 p.m.	Charlotte	M. M. Roberts Stadium; Hattiesburg, MS		W 66–21	20,189
November 25	1:30 p.m.	at Marshall	Joan C. Edwards Stadium; Huntington, WV	Stadium	W 28–27	18,361
December 27	12:30 p.m.	vs. Florida State*	Independence Bowl; Shreveport, LA (Independence Bowl)	ESPN	L 13–42	33,601
*Non-conference game; ^{†}Homecoming; All times are in Central time

Schedule source:

== Game summaries ==
=== Kentucky ===
Week One: Kentucky Wildcats at Southern Miss Golden Eagles – Game summary

Quarter	1	2	3	4	Total
Wildcats	0	14	10	0	24
Golden Eagles	0	3	7	7	17

at M. M. Roberts Stadium, Hattiesburg, MS

- Date: September 2
- Game time: 3:00 p.m. CDT
- Game weather: 86°F • N 4 • Sunny
- Game attendance: 22,761
- Referee: Hubert Owens
- TV: CBSSN
- Southern Miss vs Kentucky

Game information

Second quarter

- 14:54 Kentucky – Stephen Johnson 8 yard run (Austin MacGinnis kick), Kentucky 7–0.
  Drive: 3 plays, 14 yards, 1:16
- 8:21 Southern Miss – Parker Shaunfield 22 yard field goal, Kentucky 7–3.
  Drive: 14 plays, 82 yards, 6:29
- 7:01 Kentucky – C.J. Conrad 23 yard pass from Stephen Johnson (Austin MacGinnis kick), Kentucky 14–3.
  Drive: 3 plays, 37 yards, 1:09

Third quarter

- 10:40 Southern Miss – Korey Robertson 42 yard pass from Kwadra Griggs (Parker Shaunfield kick), Kentucky 14–10.
  Drive: 6 plays, 85 yards, 2:12
- 2:03 Kentucky – Austin MacGinnis 41 yard field goal, Kentucky 17–10.
  Drive: 7 plays, 31 yards, 3:27
- 0:49 Kentucky – Denzil Ware 20 yard fumble return (Austin MacGinnis kick), Kentucky 24–10.
  Drive: 3 plays, -5 yards, 1:14

Fourth quarter

- 12:42 Southern Miss – Korey Robertson 26 yard pass from Kwadra Griggs (Parker Shaunfield kick), Kentucky 24–17.
  Drive: 11 plays, 75 yards, 3:07

Leading Passers

- USM – Kwadra Griggs, 15–26, 222 yards, 2 TD
- UK – Stephen Johnson, 11–20, 176 yards, 1 TD

Leading Rushers

- USM – Ito Smith, 16 carries, 37 yards
- UK – Benny Snell Jr., 20 carries, 67 yards

Leading Receivers

- USM – Korey Robertson, 7 receptions, 111 yards, 2 TD
- UK – C. J. Conrad, 3 receptions, 97 yards, 1 TD

Leading Tacklers

- USM – Tarvarius Moore, 8 tackles
- UK – Courtney Love, 9 tackles

=== Southern ===
Week Two: Southern Jaguars at Southern Miss Golden Eagles – Game summary

Quarter	1	2	3	4	Total
Jaguars	0	0	0	0	0
Golden Eagles	28	7	10	0	45

at M. M. Roberts Stadium, Hattiesburg, MS

- Date: September 9
- Game time: 6:00 p.m. CDT
- Game weather: 79°F • NNE 7 • Sunny, 51% Humidity
- Game attendance: 24,337
- Referee: Will Williams
- TV: STADIUM
- Southern Miss vs Southern

Game information

First quarter

- 10:58 Southern Miss – Xavier Thigpen 0 yard fumble return (Parker Shaunfield kick), Southern Miss 7–0.
  Drive: 4 plays, -7 yards, 1:36
- 6:54 Southern Miss – Ito Smith 27 yard run (Parker Shaunfield kick), Southern Miss 14–0.
  Drive: 6 plays, 69 yards, 2:19
- 5:47 Southern Miss – Allenzae Staggers 20 yard pass from Kwadra Griggs (Parker Shaunfield kick), Southern Miss 21–0.
  Drive: 2 plays, 12 yards, 0:55
- 3:22 Southern Miss – T'Rod Daniels 49 yard run (Parker Shaunfield kick), Southern Miss 28–0.
  Drive: 2 plays, 50 yards, 0:31

Second quarter

- 5:53 Southern Miss – Quez Watkins 26 yard pass from Kwadra Griggs (Parker Shaunfield kick), Southern Miss 35–0.
  Drive: 4 plays, 78 yards, 1:36

Third quarter

- 14:37 Southern Miss – Cornell Armstrong 46 yard interception return (Parker Shaunfield kick), Southern Miss 42–0.
  Drive: 3 plays, -5 yards, 0:23
- 0:00 Southern Miss – Parker Shaunfield 28 yard field goal, Southern Miss 45–0.
  Drive: 11 plays, 72 yards, 4:31

Leading Passers

- SOU – Darquez Lee, 5–10, 56 yards
- USM – Kwadra Griggs, 15–23, 209 yards, 2 TD

Leading Rushers

- SOU – Devon Benn, 8 carries, 42 yards
- USM – Trod Daniels, 10 carries, 83 yards, 1 TD

Leading Receivers

- SOU – Jamar Washington, 3 receptions, 36 yards
- USM – Allenzae Staggers, 5 receptions, 62 yards, 1 TD

Leading Tacklers

- SOU – Andrea Augustine, 8 tackles
- USM – Tyler Barnes, 5 tackles

=== @ Louisiana–Monroe ===
Week Three: Southern Miss Golden Eagles at Louisiana–Monroe Warhawks – Game summary

Quarter	1	2	3	4	Total
Golden Eagles	7	14	7	0	28
Warhawks	0	10	7	0	17

at Malone Stadium, Monroe, LA

- Date: September 16
- Game time: 6:00 p.m. CDT
- Game weather: 88°F • SE 5 • Partly Cloudy
- Game attendance: 11,061
- Referee: Justin Elliot
- TV: ESPN3
- Southern Miss vs Louisiana–Monroe

Game information

First quarter

- 10:38 Southern Miss – Korey Robertson 15 yard pass from Kwadra Griggs (Parker Shaunfield kick), Southern Miss 7–0.
  Drive: 9 plays, 68 yards, 3:21

Second quarter

- 14:36 Louisiana–Monroe – Caleb Evans 1 yard run (Craig Ford kick), Tied 7–7.
  Drive: 10 plays, 76 yards, 3:39
- 12:05 Southern Miss – Ito Smith 27 yard run (Parker Shaunfield kick), Southern Miss 14–7.
  Drive: 6 plays, 74 yards, 2:31
- 3:17 Louisiana–Monroe – Craig Ford 19 yard field goal, Southern Miss 14–10.
  Drive: 9 plays, 59 yards, 4:36
- 1:51 Southern Miss – Korey Robertson 20 yard pass from Kwadra Griggs (Parker Shaunfield kick), Southern Miss 21–10.
  Drive: 5 plays, 78 yards, 1:26

Third quarter

- 8:55 Louisiana–Monroe – Caleb Evans 67 yard run (Craig Ford kick), Southern Miss 21–17.
  Drive: 1 play, 67 yards, 0:11
- 5:31 Southern Miss – Allenzae Staggers 42 yard pass from Kwadra Griggs (Parker Shaunfield kick), Southern Miss 28–17.
  Drive: 9 plays, 79 yards, 3:24

Leading Passers

- USM – Kwadra Griggs, 17–32, 250 yards, 3 TD, 1 INT
- ULM – Garret Smith, 4–9, 60 yards

Leading Rushers

- USM – Ito Smith, 27 carries, 219 yards, 1 TD
- ULM – Derrick Gore, 18 carries, 96 yards

Leading Receivers

- USM – Allanzae Staggers, 4 receptions, 75 yards, 1 TD
- ULM – J. Pederson, 3 receptions, 42 yards

Leading Tacklers

- USM – Kelsey Douglas, 7 tackles
- ULM – David Griffith, 9 tackles

=== North Texas ===
Week Five: North Texas Mean Green at Southern Miss Golden Eagles – Game summary

Quarter	1	2	3	4	Total
Mean Green	7	10	16	10	43
Golden Eagles	14	7	7	0	28

at M. M. Roberts Stadium, Hattiesburg, MS

- Date: September 30
- Game time: 6:00 p.m. CDT
- Game weather: 85°F • NNE 4 • Mostly Cloudy
- Game attendance: 21,907
- Referee: S. LaMantia
- TV: CUSA.TV
- Southern Miss vs North Texas

Game information

First quarter

- 11:44 Southern Miss – Allenzae Staggers 7 yard pass from Kwadra Griggs (Parker Shaunfield kick), Southern Miss 7–0
  Drive: 9 plays, 75 yards, 3:16
- 5:38 Southern Miss – Kwadre Griggs 4 yard run (Parker Shaunfield kick), Southern Miss 14–0
  Drive: 7 plays, 64 yards, 2:01
- 0:47 North Texas – Jeffrey Wilson 46 yard run (Trevor Moore kick), Southern Miss 14–7
  Drive: 4 plays, 55 yards, 1:17

Second quarter

- 10:00 Southern Miss – Ito Smith 65 yard run (Parker Shaunfield kick), Southern Miss 21–7
  Drive: 5 plays, 77 yards, 2:09
- 2:42 North Texas – Jaylen Guyton 2 yard pass from Mason Fine (Trevor Moore kick), Southern Miss 21–14
  Drive: 12 plays, 95 yards, 5:11
- 0:00 North Texas – Trevor Moore 48 yard field goal, Southern Miss 21–17
  Drive: 8 plays, 49 yards, 0:54

Third quarter

- 9:01 North Texas – Trevor Moore 20 yard field goal, Southern Miss 21–20
  Drive: 14 plays, 72 yards, 5:59
- 4:08 North Texas – Rico Bussey 16 yard pass from Mason Fine (Trevor Moore kick), North Texas 27–21
  Drive: 6 plays, 71 yards, 1:56
- 2:49 North Texas – Jeffrey Wilson 43 yard run (Mason Fine pass fail), North Texas 33–21
  Drive: 3 plays, 51 yards, 0:25
- 0:00 Southern Miss – Ito Smith 4 yard run (Parker Shaunfield kick), North Texas 33–28
  Drive: 9 plays, 75 yards, 2:49

Fourth quarter

- 11:29 North Texas – Jeffrey Wilson 6 yard run (Trevor Moore kick), North Texas 40–28
  Drive: 8 plays, 75 yards, 3:31
- 4:30 North Texas – Trevor Moore 44 yard field goal, North Texas 43–28
  Drive: 11 plays, 58 yards, 5:38

Leading Passers

- UNT – TD Mason Fine, 24-40, 366 yards, 2 TD, 1 INT
- USM – Kwadra Griggs, 19-42, 270 yards, 1 TD

Leading Rushers

- UNT – Jeffrey Wilson, 30 carries, 148 yards, 3 TD
- USM – Ito Smith, 13 carries, 102 yards, 2 TD

Leading Receivers

- UNT – Jalen Guyton, 14 receptions, 211 yards, 1 TD
- USM – Allenze Staggers, 5 receptions, 112 yards, 1 TD

Leading Tacklers

- UNT – E. J. Ejiya, 10 tackles
- USM – Curtis Mikell, 12 tackles

=== @ UTSA ===
Week Six: Southern Miss Golden Eagles at UTSA Roadrunners – Game summary

Quarter	1	2	3	4	Total
Golden Eagles	7	0	14	10	31
Roadrunners	3	10	0	16	29

at Alamodome, San Antonio, TX

- Date: October 7
- Game time: 6:00 p.m. CDT
- Game weather: indoors
- Game attendance: 23,517
- Referee: Dan Gautreaux
- TV: STADIUM
- Southern Miss at UTSA

Game information

First quarter

- 11:02 UTSA – Jared Sackett 38 yard field goal, UTSA 3–0
  Drive: 10 plays, 56 yards, 3:58
- 9:34 Southern Miss – Jay'Shaw Washington 32 yard pass from Keon Howard (Parker Shaunfield kick), Southern Miss 7–3
  Drive: 4 plays, 64 yards, 1:28

Second quarter

- 2:52 UTSA – Joah Stewart 21 yard pass from Dalton Strum (Jared Sackett kick), UTSA 10–7
  Drive: 11 plays, 92 yards, 4:56
- 0:32 UTSA – Jared Sackett 40 yard field goal, UTSA 13–7
  Drive: 5 plays, 42 yards, 1:02

Third quarter

- 2:52 Southern Miss – Korey Robertson 20 yard pass from Keon Howard (Parker Shaunfield kick), Southern Miss 14–13
  Drive: 4 plays, 39 yards, 1:44
- 1:05 Southern Miss – Quez Watkins 48 yard pass from Keon Howard (Parker Shaunfield kick), Southern Miss 21–13
  Drive: 1 play, 48 yards, 0:09

Fourth quarter

- 13:20 Southern Miss – Ito Smith 89 yard run (Parker Shaunfield kick), Southern Miss 28–13
  Drive: 1 play, 89 yards, 0:14
- 9:48 UTSA – Marquez McNair 28 yard pass from Strum (Sackett kick), Southern Miss 28–20
  Drive: 8 plays, 75 yards, 3:32
- 7:33 UTSA – Jared Sackett 44 yard field goal, Southern Miss 28–23
  Drive: 4 plays, 5 yards, 1:27
- 1:56 Southern Miss – Parker Shaunfield 24 yard field goal, Southern Miss 31–23
  Drive: 12 plays, 69 yards, 5:37
- 0:48 UTSA – McNair 24 yard pass from Strum (two-point pass conv. failed), Southern Miss 31–29
  Drive: 5 plays, 53 yards, 1:08

Leading Passers

- USM –
- UTSA –

Leading Rushers

- USM –
- UTSA –

Leading Receivers

- USM –
- UTSA –

Leading Tacklers

- USM –
- UTSA –

=== UTEP ===
Week Seven: UTEP Miners at Southern Miss Golden Eagles – Game summary

Quarter	1	2	3	4	Total
Miners	0	0	0	0	0
Golden Eagles	7	7	0	10	24

at M. M. Roberts Stadium, Hattiesburg, MS

- Date: October 14
- Game time: 6:00 p.m. CDT

Game information

First quarter
Second quarter
Third quarter
Fourth quarter

Leading Passers

- UTEP –
- USM –

Leading Rushers

- UTEP –
- USM –

Leading Receivers

- UTEP –
- USM –

Leading Tacklers

- UTEP –
- USM –

=== @ Louisiana Tech ===
Week Eight: Southern Miss Golden Eagles at Louisiana Tech Bulldogs – Game summary

Quarter	1	2	3	4	OT	2OT	Total
Golden Eagles	3	7	6	11	0	7	34
Bulldogs	3	14	0	10	0	0	27

at Joe Aillet Stadium, Ruston, LA

- Date: October 21
- Game time: 6:00 p.m. CDT
- Game weather: 80°F · SE 15 · Cloudy
- Game attendance: 17,815
- Referee: Ken Antee
- TV: STADIUM
- Southern Miss vs Louisiana Tech

Game information

First quarter

- 9:58 Louisiana Tech - J. Barnes 23 yard field goal, Louisiana Tech 3–0. Drive: 9 plays, 86 yards, 2:59
- 0:53 Southern Miss - Parker Shaunfield 45 yard field goal, Tied 3-3. Drive: 10 plays, 44 yards, 3:46

Second quarter

- 14:18 Louisiana Tech - Boston Scott 15 yard run (J. Barnes kick), Louisiana Tech 10-3. Drive: 4 plays, 65 yards, 1:35
- 10:36 Southern Miss - Ito Smith 23 yard pass from Keon Howard (Parker Shaunfield kick), Tied 10-10 Drive: 10 plays, 78 yards, 3:42
- 2:32 Louisiana Tech - Daryl Lewis 63 yard interception return (J. Barnes kick), Louisiana Tech 17-10.

Third quarter

- 11:17 Southern Miss - Parker Shaunfield 34 yard field goal, Louisiana Tech 17-13. Drive: 7 plays, 32 yards, 2:36
- 0:35 Southern Miss - Parker Shaunfield 26 yard field goal, Louisiana Tech 17-16. Drive: 18 plays, 73 yards, 8:45

Fourth quarter

- 11:38 Louisiana Tech - J. Barnes 45 yard field goal, Louisiana Tech 20–16. Drive: 4 plays, 3 yards, 1:33
- 4:08 Louisiana Tech - J'Mar Smith 2 yard run (J. Barnes kick), Louisiana Tech 27-16. Drive: 5 plays, 96 yards, 2:02
- 1:23 Southern Miss - Parker Shaunfield 49 yard field goal, Louisiana Tech 27-19. Drive: 12 plays, 43 yards, 2:45
- 0:31 Southern Miss - Korey Robertson 22 yard pass from Keon Howard (Jay'Shaw Washington pass from Keon Howard), Tied 27-27 Drive: 3 plays, 63 yards, 0:52

Overtime

- 15:00 Southern Miss - Korey Robertson 25 yard pass from Keon Howard (Parker Shaunfield kick), Southern Miss 34-27 Drive: 1 plays, 25 yards, 0:00

Leading Passers

- USM – Keon Howard, 32-53, 301 yards, 3 TD, 2 INT
- LTU – J'Mar Smith, 11-28, 194 yards, 1 INT

Leading Rushers

- USM – Tez Parks, 15 carries, 77 yards
- LTU – Boston Scott, 11 carries, 106 yards, 1 TD

Leading Receivers

- USM – Korey Robertson, 9 receptions, 127 yards, 2 TD
- LSU – Marlon Watts, 121 yards

Leading Tacklers

- USM – Tarvarias Moore, 10 tackles
- LSU – D. Washington, 14 tackles

=== UAB ===
Week Nine: UAB Blazers at Southern Miss Golden Eagles – Game summary

Quarter	1	2	3	4	Total
Blazers	7	0	6	17	30
Golden Eagles	9	3	0	0	12

at M. M. Roberts Stadium, Hattiesburg, MS

- Date: October 28
- Game time: 6:00 p.m. CDT

Game information

First quarter
Second quarter
Third quarter
Fourth quarter

Leading Passers

- UAB –
- USM –

Leading Rushers

- UAB –
- USM –

Leading Receivers

- UAB –
- USM –

Leading Tacklers

- UAB –
- USM –

=== @ Tennessee ===
Week Ten: Southern Miss Golden Eagles at Tennessee Volunteers – Game summary

Quarter	1	2	3	4	Total
Golden Eagles	0	3	0	7	10
Volunteers	7	3	14	0	24

at Neyland Stadium, Knoxville, TN

- Date: November 4
- Game time: 6:30 p.m. CDT
- Game attendance: 95,551

Game information

First quarter
Second quarter
Third quarter
Fourth quarter

Leading Passers

- USM –
- TENN –

Leading Rushers

- USM –
- TENN –

Leading Receivers

- USM –
- TENN –

Leading Tacklers

- USM –
- TENN –

=== @ Rice ===
Week Eleven: Southern Miss Golden Eagles at Rice Owls – Game summary

Quarter	1	2	3	4	Total
Golden Eagles	10	12	14	7	43
Owls	0	14	13	7	34

at Rice Stadium, Houston, TX

- Date: November 11
- Game time: 2:30 p.m. CST
- Game attendance: 18,124

Game information

First quarter
Second quarter
Third quarter
Fourth quarter

Leading Passers

- USM –
- RU –

Leading Rushers

- USM –
- RU –

Leading Receivers

- USM –
- RU –

Leading Tacklers

- USM –
- RU –

=== Charlotte ===
Week Twelve: Charlotte 49ers at Southern Miss Golden Eagles – Game summary

Quarter	1	2	3	4	Total
49ers	0	7	7	7	21
Golden Eagles	13	25	14	14	66

at M. M. Roberts Stadium, Hattiesburg, MS

- Date: November 18
- Game time: 2:00 p.m. CST
- Game attendance: 20,189

Game information

First quarter
Second quarter
Third quarter
Fourth quarter

Leading Passers

- UNCC –
- USM –

Leading Rushers

- UNCC –
- USM –

Leading Receivers

- UNCC –
- USM –

Leading Tacklers

- UNCC –
- USM –

=== @ Marshall ===
Week Thirteen: Southern Miss Golden Eagles at Marshall Thundering Herd – Game summary

Quarter	1	2	3	4	Total
Golden Eagles	0	14	7	7	28
Thundering Herd	0	14	7	6	27

at Joan C. Edwards Stadium, Huntington, WV

- Date: November 25
- Game time: 1:30 p.m. CST
- Game attendance: 18,361

Game information

First quarter
Second quarter
Third quarter
Fourth quarter

Leading Passers

- USM –
- MU –

Leading Rushers

- USM –
- MU –

Leading Receivers

- USM –
- MU –

Leading Tacklers

- USM –
- MU –

=== vs Florida State–Independence Bowl ===
Southern Miss vs Florida State (Independence Bowl) – Game summary

Quarter	1	2	3	4	Total
Golden Eagles	6	0	7	0	13
Seminoles	7	16	10	9	42

at Independence Stadium, Shreveport, LA

- Date: December 27
- Game time: 12:30 p.m. CST
- Game attendance: 33,601

Game information

First quarter
Second quarter
Third quarter
Fourth quarter

Leading Passers

- USM –
- FSU –

Leading Rushers

- USM –
- FSU –

Leading Receivers

- USM –
- FSU –

Leading Tacklers

- USM –
- FSU –
