= 2017 Independence Bowl =

2017 Walk-On's Independence Bowl
- 42nd Independence Bowl
Southern Miss Golden Eagles	Florida State Seminoles
(8–4)	(6–6)
C-USA	ACC
13	42
Head coach: Jay Hopson	Head coach: Odell Haggins (Interim)
	1	2	3	4	Total
Southern Miss	6	0	7	0	13
Florida State	7	16	10	9	42
- Date: December 27, 2017
- Season: 2017
- Stadium: Independence Stadium
- Location: Shreveport, Louisiana
- MVP: James Blackman (QB, Florida State) & Nate Andrews (DB, Florida State)
- Referee: Greg Sujack (MAC)
- Attendance: 33,601
- Payout: US$1,466,200

United States TV coverage
- Network: ESPN
- Announcers: Dave LaMont, Ahmad Brooks, Roddy Jones

The 2017 Independence Bowl was a college football bowl game played on December 27, 2017, at Independence Stadium in Shreveport, Louisiana. The 42nd annual Independence Bowl featured the Southern Miss Golden Eagles of Conference USA against the Florida State Seminoles of the Atlantic Coast Conference. Sponsored by Walk-On's Bistreaux & Bar, the game was officially known as the Walk-On's Independence Bowl.

The contest was televised on ESPN, with kickoff at 1:30 p.m. (EST). It was one of the 2017–18 bowl games concluding the 2017 FBS football season. Florida State defeated Southern Miss, 42–13.

== Team selection ==
The game featured the Southern Miss Golden Eagles against the Florida State Seminoles.

This was the twenty-third meeting between the schools, with Florida State holding a 13–8–1 advantage. They had most recently played in 1996, when the Seminoles defeated the Golden Eagles by a score of 54–14.

=== Florida State ===
On December 21, 2017, an unofficial report was published on Reddit claiming that the Seminoles were not bowl eligible due to an NCAA rule stating that for an FCS opponent to be countable towards bowl eligibility, the FCS program must have awarded 90% of the FCS scholarship limit. Delaware State, an FCS team that lost to FSU earlier in the season, did not meet the 90% threshold set by the NCAA. Without this win, FSU stood at 5–6 on the season. However, on December 22, 2017, Florida State addressed the issue and stated that Delaware State verified its scholarship situation as eclipsing the 90-percent threshold. This, FSU claims, is due to an alleged established NCAA rule interpretation, allowing academic and other non-athletic scholarships to count towards the required threshold, however they did not reference the interpreted rule. The confirmation officially gave Florida State bowl eligibility, and allowed the team to play in the Independence Bowl.

== Game summary ==
=== Scoring summary ===
Scoring summary

Quarter	Time	Drive			Team	Scoring information	Score	
Quarter	Time	Plays	Yards	TOP	Team	Scoring information	USM	FSU
1	11:05	8	78	3:55	USM	Kwadra Griggs 5-yard touchdown run, Parker Shaunfield kick no good	6	0
1	5:20	12	75	5:45	FSU	Auden Tate 20-yard touchdown reception from James Blackman, Ricky Aguayo kick good	6	7
2	12:38	9	80	4:59	FSU	Cam Akers 14-yard touchdown reception from James Blackman, Ricky Aguayo kick no good	6	13
2	7:48	8	58	2:51	FSU	29-yard field goal by Ricky Aguayo	6	16
2	1:33	4	24	1:30	FSU	Auden Tate 10-yard touchdown reception from James Blackman, Ricky Aguayo kick good	6	23
3	10:45	10	43	4:15	FSU	39-yard field goal by Ricky Aguayo	6	26
3	3:25	9	85	4:40	FSU	Jacques Patrick 2-yard touchdown run, Ricky Aguayo kick good	6	33
3	0:44	6	75	2:41	USM	Korey Robertson 13-yard touchdown reception from Kwadra Griggs, Parker Shaunfield kick good	13	33
4	13:34	5	30	2:10	FSU	Auden Tate 17-yard touchdown reception from James Blackman, Ricky Aguayo kick no good (snap fumbled)	13	39
4	7:32	8	13	3:54	FSU	39-yard field goal by Ricky Aguayo	13	42
"TOP" = time of possession. For other American football terms, see Glossary of American football.							13	42

=== Statistics ===
	1	2	3	4	Total
Golden Eagles	6	0	7	0	13
Seminoles	7	16	10	9	42

Statistics	USM	FSU
First downs	12	25
Plays–yards	55–260	74–452
Rushes–yards	28–131	45–214
Passing yards	129	238
Passing: Comp–Att–Int	15-27-0	19-29-0
Time of possession	22:52	37:08

Team	Category	Player	Statistics
Southern Miss	Passing	Kwanda Griggs	13-25, 86 yds., 1 TD
Southern Miss	Rushing	Ito Smith	16 carries, 92 yds.
Southern Miss	Receiving	Korey Robertson	4 rec., 36 yds., 1 TD
Florida State	Passing	James Blackman	18-26, 233 yds., 4 TD
Florida State	Rushing	Cam Akers	13 carries, 94 yds.
Florida State	Receiving	Auden Tate	5 rec., 84 yds., 3 TD
