= Marcus Davenport =

American football player (born 1996)

No. 92, 0, 52
- Position: Defensive end

Personal information
- Born: September 4, 1996 (age 30); San Antonio, Texas, U.S.
- Listed height: 6 ft 6 in (1.98 m)
- Listed weight: 265 lb (120 kg)

Career information
- High school: John Paul Stevens (San Antonio)
- College: UTSA (2014–2017)
- NFL draft: 2018: 1st round, 14th overall pick

Career history
- New Orleans Saints (2018–2022); Minnesota Vikings (2023); Detroit Lions (2024–2025); Chicago Bears (2026)

Awards and highlights
- PFWA All-Rookie Team (2018); C-USA Defensive Player of the Year (2017); First-team All C-USA (2017); Second-team All C-USA (2016); UTSA Sports Hall of Fame (2023)

Career NFL statistics
- Total tackles: 166
- Sacks: 25
- Forced fumbles: 7
- Fumble recoveries: 1
- Pass deflections: 4
- Stats at Pro Football Reference

Marcus Davenport (born September 4, 1996) is an American former professional football defensive end. He played college football for the UTSA Roadrunners and was selected by the New Orleans Saints in the first round of the 2018 NFL draft. He also played for the Minnesota Vikings and Detroit Lions.

== Early life ==
Davenport attended John Paul Stevens High School in San Antonio, Texas, where he played high school football. Barely recruited out of high school, he chose to play college football for the UTSA Roadrunners (UTSA) over UNLV. Davenport graduated from UTSA in 2017.

== College career ==
Davenport played at UTSA from 2014 to 2017. As a senior in 2017, he was the Conference USA Defensive Player of the Year after recording 55 tackles and 8.5 sacks. During his career, he had 185 tackles and 21.5 sacks.

=== College statistics ===
Season	Team	Conf	Class	Pos	GP	Tackles					Interceptions					Fumbles			
Season	Team	Conf	Class	Pos	GP	Solo	Ast	Cmb	TfL	Sck	Int	Yds	Avg	TD	PD	FR	Yds	TD	FF
2014	UTSA	CUSA	FR	DE	8	5	9	14	2.5	2.5	0	0	0.0	0	0	0	—	—	0
2015	UTSA	CUSA	SO	DE	11	30	19	49	7.5	4.0	0	0	0.0	0	3	0	—	—	2
2016	UTSA	CUSA	JR	DE	13	30	37	67	10.0	6.5	0	0	0.0	0	1	1	—	—	1
2017	UTSA	CUSA	SR	DE	11	30	25	55	17.5	8.5	0	0	0.0	0	4	1	—	1	3
Career					43	95	90	185	37.5	21.5	0	0	0.0	0	8	2	—	1	6

== Professional career ==
Pre-draft measurables
Height	Weight	Arm length	Hand span	Wingspan	40-yard dash	10-yard split	20-yard split	20-yard shuttle	Three-cone drill	Vertical jump	Broad jump	Bench press
6 ft 5 3/4 in (1.97 m)	264 lb (120 kg)	33 5/8 in (0.85 m)	9 1/8 in (0.23 m)	6 ft 8 5/8 in (2.05 m)	4.58 s	1.63 s	2.67 s	4.41 s	7.20 s	33.5 in (0.85 m)	10 ft 4 in (3.15 m)	22 reps
All values from NFL Combine

=== New Orleans Saints ===
Davenport was drafted by the New Orleans Saints in the first round (14th overall) of the 2018 NFL draft. He was the second defensive end to be selected that year, behind only Bradley Chubb. The pick used to select Davenport was acquired from the Green Bay Packers. On May 10, 2018, Davenport signed his rookie contract with the Saints, worth $13.7 million. On June 11, 2018, it was reported that Davenport injured his thumb and that it would require surgery. In Week 3, against the Atlanta Falcons, Davenport recorded his first career sack in the victory. In Week 8, against the Minnesota Vikings, he recorded a two-sack performance in the victory. He was named to the PFWA All-Rookie Team.

In a Week 2 matchup against the Los Angeles Rams in 2019, Davenport sacked Jared Goff as the Saints lost 27–9. In a Week 5 game against the Tampa Bay Buccaneers, Davenport sacked Jameis Winston twice in the 31–24 win. In week 13 against the Falcons on Thanksgiving Day, Davenport sacked Matt Ryan twice, one of which was a strip sack that was recovered by teammate Vonn Bell, in the 26–18 win. On December 11, 2019, Davenport was placed on injured reserve with a foot injury. He finished the season with 31 tackles, six sacks, and three forced fumbles through 13 starts.

In Week 7 against the Carolina Panthers in 2020, Davenport recorded his first sack of the season on former Saints' teammate Teddy Bridgewater during the 27–24 win. He finished the 2020 season with 1.5 sacks, 21 total tackles (12 solo), and two passes defended.

The Saints exercised the fifth-year option on Davenport's contract on April 29, 2021. The option guarantees a salary of $9.5 million for the 2022 season. He was placed on injured reserve on September 17, 2021, with a shoulder injury. He was activated on October 25. He finished the 2021 season with nine sacks, 39 total tackles (23 solo), three forced fumbles, and one fumble recovery.

On June 15, 2022, Davenport announced he had undergone five total offseason surgeries: two on his shoulder and three on his left hand. One of the hand surgeries was to address a pinkie finger issue that had plagued him since college and involved a partial amputation of the finger. He finished the 2022 season with .5 sacks and 29 total tackles (16 solo).

=== Minnesota Vikings ===
On March 15, 2023, Davenport signed a one-year, $13 million contract with the Minnesota Vikings. The team has listed Davenport as an outside linebacker. He suffered a high ankle sprain in Week 6 and was placed on injured reserve on October 16. He appeared in four games and had two sacks in the 2023 season.

=== Detroit Lions ===
On March 13, 2024, Davenport signed a one-year deal with the Detroit Lions. The deal has a maximum value of $10.5 million, and includes a $6.5 million base salary. In a game at the Arizona Cardinals on September 22, Davenport suffered a season-ending triceps injury after three games.

On March 10, 2025, Davenport signed a one-year contract extension with the Lions. He began the year as one of Detroit's starting defensive ends. In Week 2 against the Chicago Bears, Davenport suffered a chest injury that necessitated an injured reserve placement on September 22. He was activated on November 26, ahead of the team's Week 13 matchup against the Green Bay Packers. He finished the 2025 season with one sack and 14 total tackles (six solo) in eight games.

=== Chicago Bears ===
On August 17, 2026, Davenport signed with the Chicago Bears. Davenport was released by Chicago as a part of final roster cuts on August 30; he was re-signed to the team's practice squad the following day. Davenport requested his release on October 5 and announced his retirement from football.

== NFL career statistics ==
Legend
**Bold**	Career high

Regular season
Year	Team	Games		Tackles			
Year	Team	GP	GS	Cmb	Solo	Ast	Sck
2018	NO	13	0	21	12	9	4.5
2019	NO	13	13	31	15	**16**	6.0
2020	NO	11	1	21	12	9	1.5
2021	NO	11	9	**39**	**23**	**16**	**9.0**
2022	NO	15	9	29	16	13	0.5
2023	MIN	4	3	7	3	4	2.0
2024	DET	2	1	2	1	1	0.5
2025	DET	8	7	14	6	8	1.0
2026	CHI	1	0	1	0	1	0.0
Total		78	43	166	88	78	25.0

Postseason
Year	Team	Games		Tackles			
Year	Team	GP	GS	Cmb	Solo	Ast	Sck
2018	NO	2	0	**4**	**3**	**1**	0.0
2019	NO	0	0	Did not play due to injury			
2020	NO	2	1	**4**	**3**	**1**	0.0
2024	DET	0	0	Did not play due to injury			
Total		4	1	8	6	2	0.0
