= John Paul Stevens High School =

School in San Antonio, Texas

Location
- 600 North Ellison Drive; San Antonio, Bexar County, Texas 78251; United States; 29.440332°N 98.685468°W

Information
- Type: Public Secondary
- Established: 2005
- School district: Northside Independent School District
- Superintendent: John M Craft
- NCES School ID: 483312010437
- Principal: Ryan Purtell
- Teaching staff: 170.10 (on an FTE basis)
- Grades: 9–12
- Enrollment: 2,546 (2024–2025)
- Student to teacher ratio: 14.97
- Colors: Red, silver and black
- Athletics conference: UIL Class AAAAAA
- Mascot: Falcon
- Sports District: 28-6A
- Website: Official Website(www.runstevensrun.com)

John Paul Stevens High School located in the Seaworld area, is one of nineteen public high schools in the Northside Independent School District in San Antonio, Texas, USA. The campus is located near SeaWorld San Antonio. As with all Northside ISD schools, the school is named for a United States Supreme Court justice, in this case John Paul Stevens, who attended the school's dedication in 2005. For the 2024-2025 school year, the school received an overall rating of "D" from the Texas Education Agency.

As of 2025, the enrollment at Stevens is 2,546 students. The middle schools that feed into Stevens are Pease Middle School and Vale Middle School.

== History ==
In 1987, Pope John Paul II held mass on the site that later became Stevens High School. The service was part of his visit to San Antonio, and a monument sits near the school to commemorate the visit.

Stevens was built with funds from the voter approved 2001 Bond Issue. Designed by PBK Architects, it was built by Bartlett Cocke Contractors at a cost of $50 million. The 398,000-square-foot (37,000 m^{2}), state of the art school building is two-story, and has an abundance of natural light.

== Athletics ==
The Stevens Falcons compete in the following sports:

- Baseball
- Basketball
- Cross Country
- Football
- Golf
- Soccer
- Softball
- Swimming & Diving
- Tennis
- Track
- Volleyball

== Notable alumni ==
- Rynell Parson (Class of 2009) — Track and field athlete (LSU) specializing in the 100 meters dash (San Antonio City Record Holder)
- Marcus Davenport (Class of 2014) — Football player for the New Orleans Saints
- Mykkele Thompson (Class of 2011) — Football player for University of Texas and New York Giants
- Elijah Garcia (Class of 2016) — Football player for Rice University and Denver Broncos
