= Emmanuel Ellerbee =

American football player (born 1996)

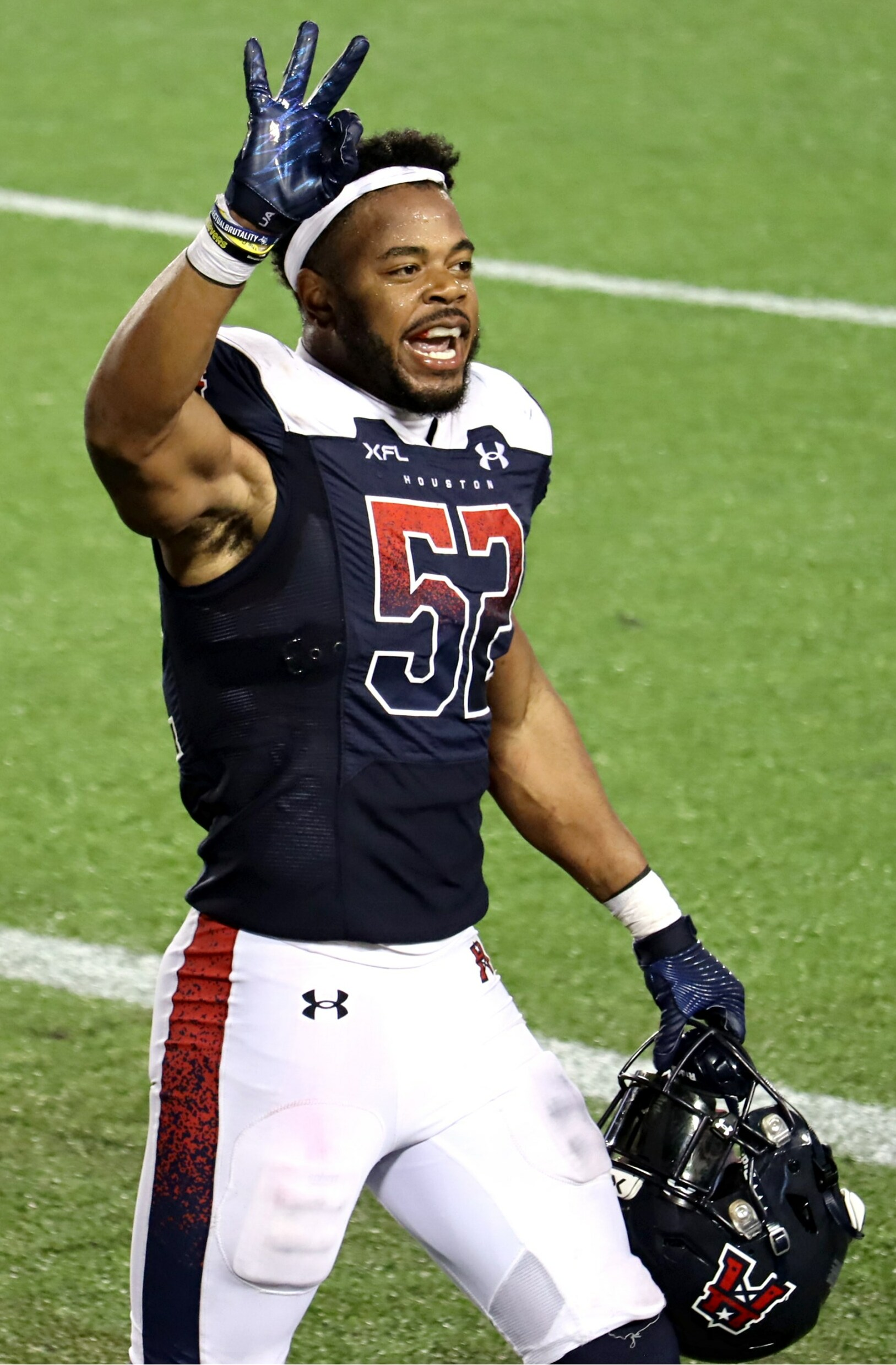
- Ellerbee with the Houston Roughnecks in 2023

No. 56, 52
- Position: Linebacker

Personal information
- Born: November 20, 1996 (age 29); Houston, Texas, U.S.
- Listed height: 6 ft 1 in (1.85 m)
- Listed weight: 235 lb (107 kg)

Career information
- High school: Strake Jesuit (Houston)
- College: Rice (2014–2017)
- NFL draft: 2018: undrafted

Career history
- Atlanta Falcons (2018)*; Los Angeles Chargers (2018); Seattle Seahawks (2018–2020); Houston Texans (2020)*; Atlanta Falcons (2021); Houston Roughnecks (2023)
- * Offseason or practice squad member only

Awards and highlights
- First-team All-Conference USA (2016, 2017)

Career NFL statistics
- Total tackles: 1
- Stats at Pro Football Reference

Emmanuel Ellerbee (born November 20, 1996) is an American former professional football player who was a linebacker in the National Football League (NFL). He played college football for the Rice Owls and was signed by the Atlanta Falcons as an undrafted free agent in 2018.

== Early life ==
Ellerbee was born and raised in Houston, Texas, and attended high school at Strake Jesuit College Preparatory. He was a second-team All-District and an honorable mention All-State selection at linebacker for Strake. A Houston-area top 100 football recruit, Ellerbee committed to play college football for Rice after being recruited by Princeton, Harvard, and Texas State.

== College career ==
Ellerbee played four seasons at Rice University, accumulating 273 tackles, 16.5 tackles for loss, five sacks, and five fumble recoveries during his career with the Owls. He was named first-team All-Conference USA for his junior and senior seasons and recorded 238 tackles over that span.

=== College statistics ===
Year	Team	GP	TT	Solo	Ast	TFL	Sack	PDef	INT	FF	FR	BK	TD
2014	Rice	13	9	5	4	0	0	2	0	0	0	0	0
2015	Rice	12	26	15	11	2	1	1	0	0	3	0	0
2016	Rice	11	118	70	48	8	3 1/2	2	1	0	1	0	0
2017	Rice	12	120	68	52	6 1/2	1 1/2	2	0	0	1	0	0
Career		48	273	158	115	16½	5	7	1	0	5	0	0

== Professional career ==
Pre-draft measurables
Height	Weight	Arm length	Hand span	40-yard dash	10-yard split	20-yard split	20-yard shuttle	Three-cone drill	Vertical jump	Broad jump	Bench press
6 ft 0 1/2 in (1.84 m)	230 lb (104 kg)	32 3/8 in (0.82 m)	10 in (0.25 m)	4.64 s	1.64 s	2.70 s	4.46 s	7.26 s	41.5 in (1.05 m)	10 ft 2 in (3.10 m)	18 reps
All values from Pro Day

=== Atlanta Falcons ===
Ellerbee was signed by Atlanta Falcons as undrafted free agent on May 2, 2018, but was waived by the team on September 1, 2018.

=== Los Angeles Chargers ===
Ellerbee was claimed off waivers by Los Angeles Chargers on September 2, 2018. He made his NFL debut on September 30 against the San Francisco 49ers, playing on special teams. He was waived on October 20, 2018, after appearing in three games with the Chargers.

=== Seattle Seahawks ===
Ellerbee was claimed off waivers by Seattle Seahawks on October 22, 2018. He was waived on November 6, 2018, and was re-signed to the practice squad. He was promoted to the active roster on December 1, 2018. He was waived by the Seahawks two days later and re-signed to the practice squad. He was promoted back to the active roster on December 12, 2018.

On July 27, 2019, Ellerbee was placed on injured reserve. He was waived/injured on August 1, 2020, and reverted to the team's injured reserve list after clearing waivers the next day. He was waived from injured reserve on September 29, 2020.

=== Houston Texans ===
On October 12, 2020, Ellerbee was signed to the Houston Texans practice squad. His practice squad contract with the team expired after the season on January 11, 2021.

=== Atlanta Falcons (second stint) ===
On July 26, 2021, Ellerbee signed with the Atlanta Falcons. He was waived on August 31, 2021, and re-signed to the practice squad the next day. The Falcons signed Ellerbee to their active roster on November 18, 2021.

=== Houston Roughnecks ===
The Houston Roughnecks selected Ellerbee in the third round of the 2023 XFL Supplemental Draft on January 1, 2023. The Roughnecks brand was transferred to the Houston Gamblers when the XFL and USFL merged to create the United Football League (UFL).
