= Mykkele Thompson =

Italian American football player (born 1993)

No. 22
- Position: Cornerback

Personal information
- Born: April 22, 1993 (age 33); Naples, Italy
- Listed height: 6 ft 0 in (1.83 m)
- Listed weight: 193 lb (88 kg)

Career information
- High school: John Paul Stevens (San Antonio, Texas, U.S.)
- College: Texas
- NFL draft: 2015: 5th round, 144th overall pick

Career history
- New York Giants (2015−2016); New Orleans Saints (2017–2018)*; Winnipeg Blue Bombers (2019)*
- * Offseason or practice squad member only
- Stats at Pro Football Reference

Mykkele Thompson (born April 22, 1993) is a former American football cornerback. He played college football at Texas.

== Early life ==
Thompson attended John Paul Stevens High School in San Antonio, Texas.

== College career ==
Thompson played at Texas from 2011 to 2014.

== Professional career ==
Pre-draft measurables
Height	Weight	40-yard dash	20-yard shuttle	Three-cone drill	Vertical jump	Broad jump	Bench press
6 ft 1 in (1.85 m)	200 lb (91 kg)	4.47 s	4.46 s	6.97 s	36 in (0.91 m)	10 ft 6 in (3.20 m)	18 reps
All values from Pro Day

=== New York Giants ===
Thompson was drafted by the New York Giants in the fifth round of the 2015 NFL draft. On August 14, 2015, Thompson tore his Achilles tendon during the preseason opener against the Cincinnati Bengals. On the following day, Giants' head coach Tom Coughlin confirmed the injury and announced Thompson would miss the rest of the season.

On September 20, 2016, Thompson was placed on injured reserve with a knee injury.

On August 10, 2017, Thompson was waived/injured by the Giants and placed on injured reserve. He was released on September 5, 2017.

=== New Orleans Saints ===
On December 29, 2017, Thompson was signed to the practice squad of the New Orleans Saints. He signed a reserve/future contract with the Saints on January 16, 2018. He was waived on May 31, 2018.

=== Winnipeg Blue Bombers ===
On February 1, 2019, it was announced that Thompson signed with Winnipeg Blue Bombers of the Canadian Football League.
