= Elijah Garcia =

American football player (born 1998)

No. 93 – Dallas Cowboys
- Position: Defensive end
- Roster status: Active

Personal information
- Born: March 11, 1998 (age 28); Tucson, Arizona, U.S.
- Listed height: 6 ft 5 in (1.96 m)
- Listed weight: 302 lb (137 kg)

Career information
- High school: John Paul Stevens (San Antonio, Texas)
- College: Rice (2016–2021)
- NFL draft: 2022: undrafted

Career history
- Los Angeles Rams (2022)*; Denver Broncos (2022–2023); New York Giants (2024–2025); Atlanta Falcons (2025); Carolina Panthers (2026)*; Dallas Cowboys (2026)
- * Offseason or practice squad member only

Awards and highlights
- First-team All-Conference USA (2021)

Career NFL statistics as of 2025
- Total tackles: 28
- Sacks: 2.0
- Forced fumbles: 1
- Fumble recoveries: 1
- Stats at Pro Football Reference

Elijah Garcia (born March 11, 1998) is an American professional football defensive end of the Dallas Cowboys. He played college football for the Rice Owls.

== Professional career ==
Pre-draft measurables
Height	Weight	Arm length	Hand span	Wingspan	40-yard dash	10-yard split	20-yard split	20-yard shuttle	Three-cone drill	Vertical jump	Broad jump	Bench press
6 ft 5 3/8 in (1.97 m)	290 lb (132 kg)	35 in (0.89 m)	10 in (0.25 m)	6 ft 10 1/2 in (2.10 m)	5.01 s	1.76 s	2.92 s	4.55 s	7.40 s	30.0 in (0.76 m)	9 ft 6 in (2.90 m)	25 reps
All values from Pro Day

=== Los Angeles Rams ===
After not being selected in the 2022 NFL draft, Garcia signed with the Los Angeles Rams as an undrafted free agent on April 30. On August 30, during the final roster cuts, Garcia was waived, but re-signed to the practice squad the next day.

=== Denver Broncos ===
On December 7, 2022, the Denver Broncos signed Garcia off the Rams practice squad. He made his NFL debut on January 1, 2023 against the Kansas City Chiefs, playing seven snaps.

On August 27, 2024, the Broncos waived Garcia as a part of final roster cuts.

=== New York Giants ===
On August 28, 2024, Garcia was signed to the New York Giants' practice squad. On December 7, he was promoted to the active roster.

On August 26, 2025, Garcia was waived by the Giants as part of final roster cuts and re-signed to the practice squad the next day. He was promoted to the active roster on September 27. Garcia was waived on October 18 and re-signed to the practice squad three days later.

=== Atlanta Falcons ===
On November 15, 2025, Garcia was signed by the Atlanta Falcons off of the Giants' practice squad.

On April 7, 2026, Garcia re-signed with the Falcons. He was released by Atlanta on June 17.

=== Carolina Panthers ===
On July 25, 2026, Garcia signed with the Carolina Panthers. He was released by the Panthers on August 30 as a part of final roster cuts.

=== Dallas Cowboys ===
On September 1, 2026, Garcia was signed to the Dallas Cowboys' practice squad. On September 30, he was promoted to the active roster.
