= Jalen Guyton =

American football player (born 1997)

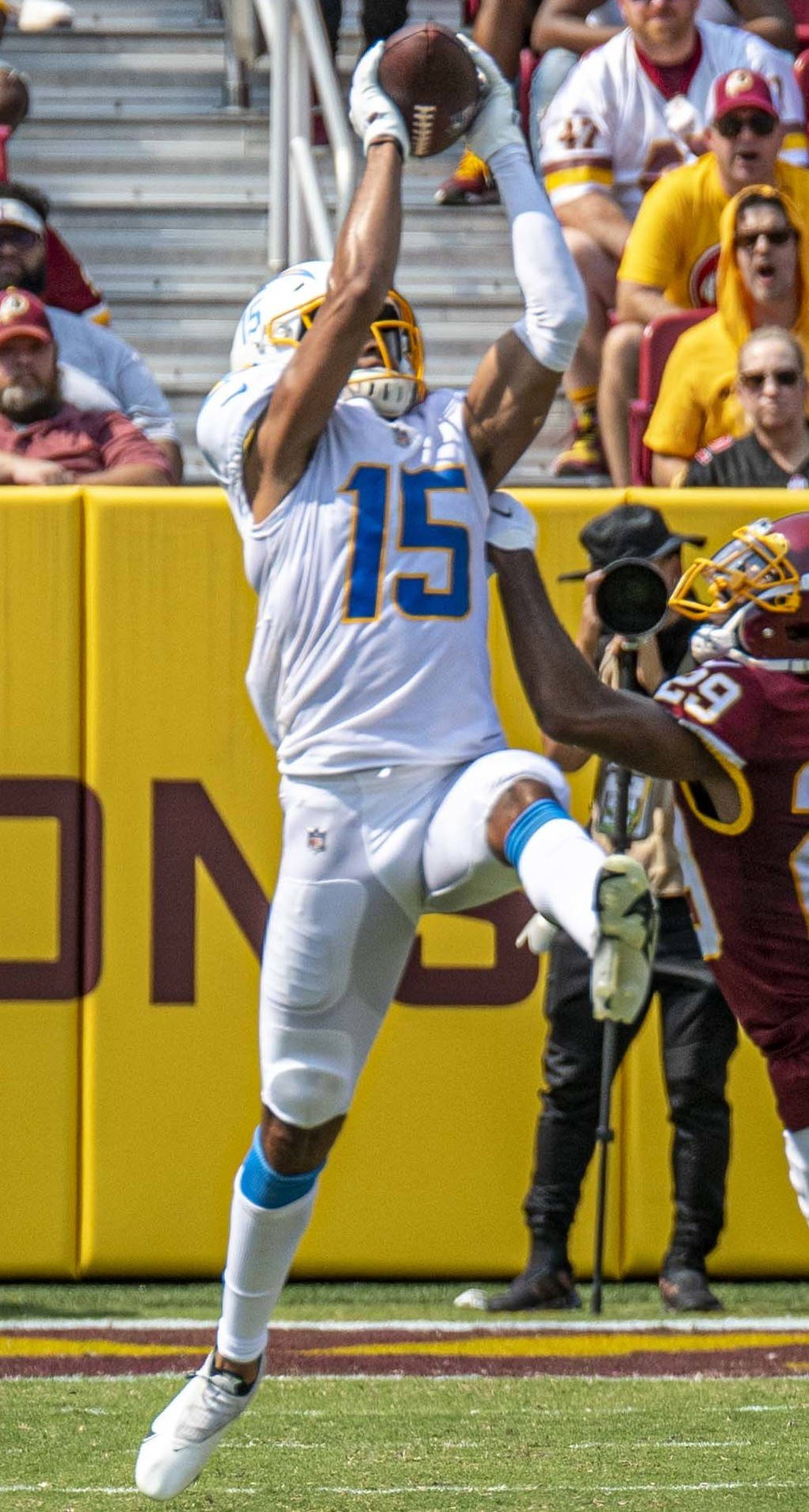
- Guyton with the Los Angeles Chargers in 2021

Profile
- Position: Wide receiver

Personal information
- Born: June 7, 1997 (age 29); Allen, Texas, U.S.
- Listed height: 6 ft 1 in (1.85 m)
- Listed weight: 212 lb (96 kg)

Career information
- High school: Allen
- College: Notre Dame (2015); Trinity Valley (2016); North Texas (2017–2018)
- NFL draft: 2019: undrafted

Career history
- Dallas Cowboys (2019)*; Los Angeles Chargers (2019–2023); Las Vegas Raiders (2024)*
- * Offseason or practice squad member only

Awards and highlights
- Second-team All-C-USA (2017)

Career NFL statistics
- Receptions: 71
- Receiving yards: 1,112
- Receiving touchdowns: 7
- Stats at Pro Football Reference

Jalen Guyton (born June 7, 1997) is an American former professional football player who was a wide receiver in the National Football League (NFL). He played college football for the North Texas Mean Green.

== Early life ==
Guyton attended Allen High School in Allen, Texas, where he played high school football and was a teammate of Kyler Murray. He caught 42 passes for 1,028 yards with 13 touchdowns in his junior season.

As a senior, Guyton pulled in 82 receptions for 1,770 yards with 22 touchdowns as Allen won their third straight State title with an overall three-year record of 47–1, including 32 straight victories.

== College career ==
Guyton began his collegiate career at Notre Dame, redshirting his true freshman season. He left the program after being suspended for disciplinary reasons and transferred to Trinity Valley Community College.

In his only season with the Cardinals, Guyton caught 45 passes for 968 yards and 12 touchdowns. He committed to transfer to the University of North Texas over offers from Marshall, Bowling Green and West Virginia.

In his first year with the Mean Green, Guyton posted 49 receptions for 775 yards and led the team with nine receiving touchdowns and was named the Conference USA co-Newcomer of the Year as well as second-team all-conference.

As a redshirt junior, he caught 54 passes for 805 yards and six touchdowns. Following the end of the season, Guyton announced he would be forgoing his final year of NCAA eligibility to enter the 2019 NFL draft.

== Professional career ==
Pre-draft measurables
Height	Weight	Arm length	Hand span	40-yard dash	10-yard split	20-yard split	20-yard shuttle	Three-cone drill	Vertical jump	Broad jump	Bench press
6 ft 0 7/8 in (1.85 m)	212 lb (96 kg)	32 in (0.81 m)	9 1/4 in (0.23 m)	4.39 s	1.55 s	2.56 s	4.09 s	6.90 s	37.5 in (0.95 m)	10 ft 5 in (3.18 m)	13 reps
All values from Pro Day

=== Dallas Cowboys ===
Guyton was signed by the Dallas Cowboys as an undrafted free agent on April 30, 2019. He was waived by the team on August 30, 2019, during final roster cuts.

=== Los Angeles Chargers ===
Guyton was signed by the Los Angeles Chargers to their practice squad on October 23, 2019. The Chargers promoted Guyton to the active roster on November 30.

Guyton caught a 16-yard pass from Tyrod Taylor for his first career reception in the 2020 season opener against the Cincinnati Bengals In Week 2, against the Kansas City Chiefs, he scored his first professional touchdown on a 14-yard reception from Justin Herbert in the 23–20 overtime loss. In Week 4 against the Tampa Bay Buccaneers, Guyton recorded one reception for a 72-yard receiving touchdown during the 38–31 loss. In Week 7, against the Jacksonville Jaguars, he had a 70-yard receiving touchdown in the 39–29 victory. Guyton played in all 16 of the Chargers' games in 2020, catching 28 passes for 511 yards and three touchdowns.

The following season, on December 5, 2021, Guyton caught four passes for 90 yards and a touchdown in a 41–22 win over the Cincinnati Bengals. On the year, Guyton finished third on the Chargers in receiving yards, at 448 total.

In Week 3 of the 2022 season, Guyton suffered a torn ACL and was placed on season-ending injured reserve on September 27, 2022.

On April 17, 2023, Guyton re-signed with the Chargers. He was placed on the reserve/physically unable to perform list on August 29. Guyton was activated on November 5.

=== Las Vegas Raiders ===
On May 6, 2024, Guyton signed with the Las Vegas Raiders. He was released on August 27, and re-signed to the practice squad. On November 18, Guyton was cut from the team.
