= Nate Davis (offensive lineman) =

American football player (born 1996)

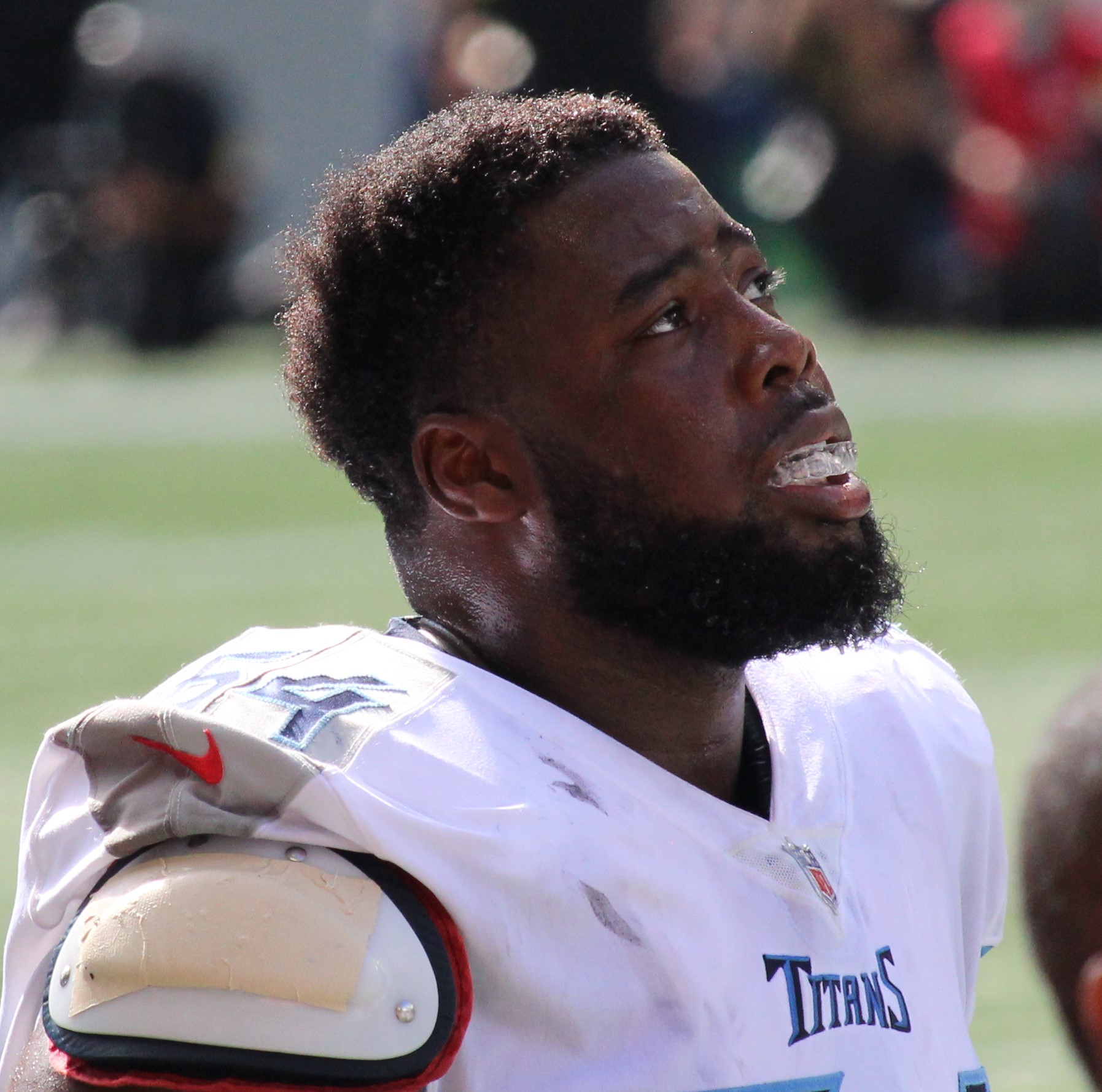
- Davis with the Tennessee Titans in 2021

Profile
- Position: Guard

Personal information
- Born: September 23, 1996 (age 30); York, Maine, U.S.
- Listed height: 6 ft 3 in (1.91 m)
- Listed weight: 316 lb (143 kg)

Career information
- High school: Stone Bridge (VA)
- College: Charlotte (2014–2018)
- NFL draft: 2019: 3rd round, 82nd overall pick

Career history
- Tennessee Titans (2019–2022); Chicago Bears (2023–2024)

Career NFL statistics as of 2024
- Games played: 71
- Games started: 67
- Stats at Pro Football Reference

Nathaniel Matthew Eugene Davis (born September 23, 1996) is an American professional football guard. He played college football at Charlotte and was selected by the Tennessee Titans in the third round of the 2019 NFL draft. He most recently played for the Chicago Bears.

== Early life ==
Davis was born on September 23, 1996 as one of three children. His siblings included two sisters named Kimberley Davis and Sonja Cannon. Born in Maine, Davis and his family later moved to Virginia where he attended Stone Bridge High School. At 6 ft 2 in (1.88 m) and weighing 250 pounds (113 kg), Davis played as a lineman in a wide range of positions including tackle, defensive tackle, offensive guard, offensive and defensive lineman for the Stone Bridge Bulldogs from 2010–2013. By his senior season, Davis grew to 6 ft 3 in (1.91 m) and weighed 300 pounds (136 kg). Davis was a four-year letterman and earned all-state, first team and regional honors. In his junior year, Davis' contributions during the 2012 aided the Bulldogs to a 14-1 season record as well as to the Virginia AAA Division 5 Championship. The following year in 2013, Davis' senior season including being named team captain and the team's most valuable player. He helped the Bulldogs to another District Championship with a season record of 9-3 in 2013. He graduated in 2014 and was ranked a two-star recruit, receiving only a single collegiate offer. In February 2014, Davis signed with Charlotte.

== College career ==
Davis joined the University of North Carolina at Charlotte in 2014 as a redshirt freshman. Still as a redshirt freshman, Davis took the field during the 2015 season. Out of all 12 games, Davis started and played in the last 10 games as a right guard. The following year in the 2016 season, Davis started 8 of his 9 played games again as a right guard, earning an all-Conference honorable mention. He received a consecutive honorable mention in the 2017 season in recognition for his performances as a starting right guard throughout the 12 total games played. In the 2018 season, Davis received first and second team and Best Offensive Player honors. In 2019, Davis declared for the 2019 NFL draft, largely inspired by his former offensive line coach Phil Ratliff, who died in August 2015. In 2019, Davis became the second pick from Charlotte in three years to join the NFL since Larry Ogunjobi joined the Cleveland Browns in the 2017 NFL draft. Davis' teammate Juwan Foggie was not selected in the 2019 NFL Draft but later became the second Charlotte 49er to join the NFL as a free agent.

== Professional career ==
Pre-draft measurables
Height	Weight	Arm length	Hand span	Wingspan	40-yard dash	10-yard split	20-yard split	20-yard shuttle	Three-cone drill	Vertical jump	Broad jump	Bench press
6 ft 3 1/4 in (1.91 m)	316 lb (143 kg)	33 1/8 in (0.84 m)	9 1/2 in (0.24 m)	6 ft 7 3/8 in (2.02 m)	5.23 s	1.84 s	3.04 s	4.83 s	7.94 s	26.0 in (0.66 m)	8 ft 11 in (2.72 m)	23 reps
All values from NFL Combine

=== Tennessee Titans ===
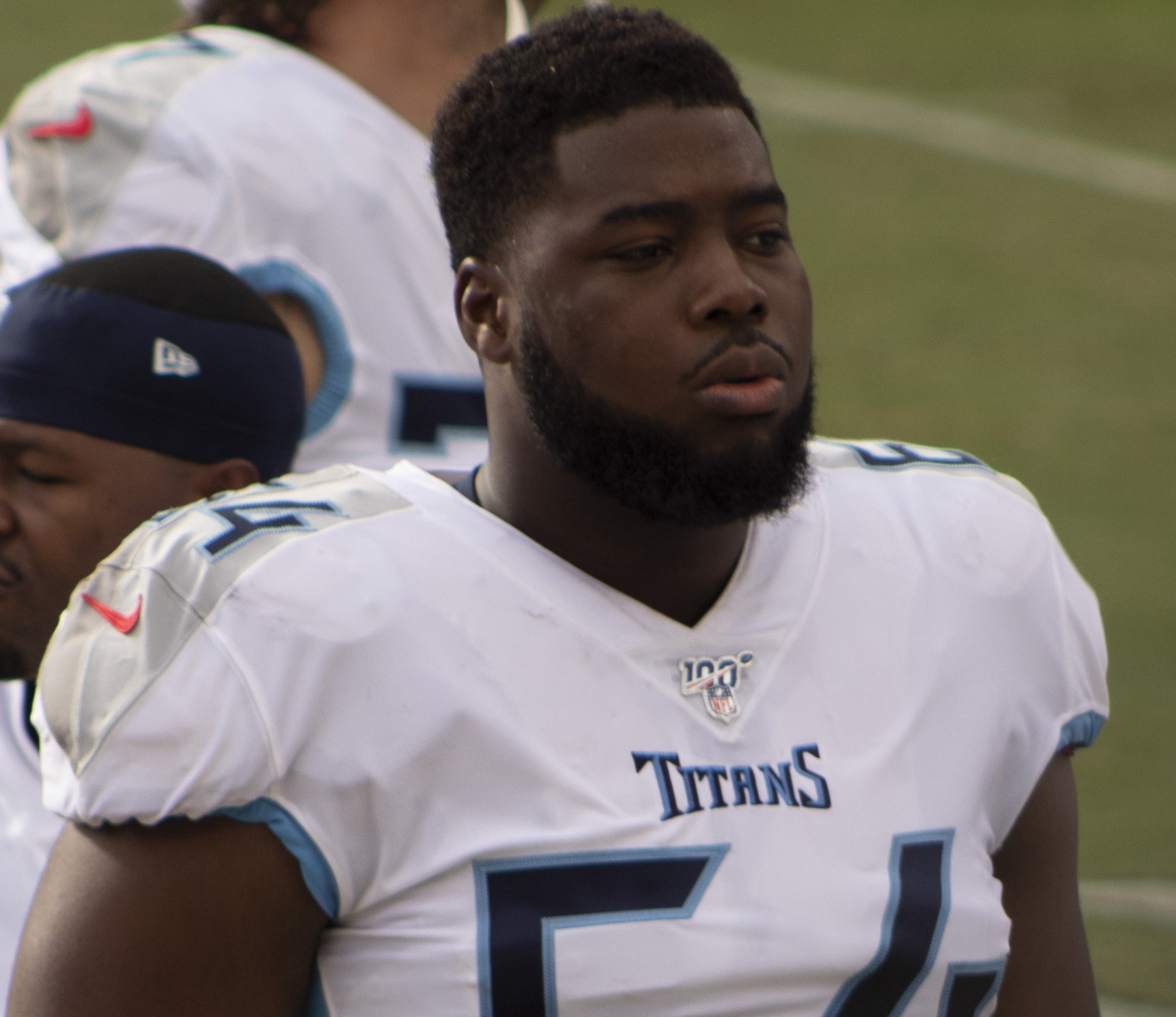
Davis in 2019

Davis was selected by the Tennessee Titans in the third round (82nd overall) of the 2019 NFL draft. He signed a four-year $3,810,648 rookie contract on May 30, 2019 with a signing bonus of $931,114 and a 2019 cap hit of $727,779.

Davis was inactive for the first three games of the 2019 season and made his regular season debut in the Titans' Week 4 win against the Atlanta Falcons. He got his first start in Week 5 and ended the season playing in 13 games, starting the last 12. During the season, he blocked for Derrick Henry who finished leading the league in rushing yards. The Titans finished with a 9-7 record and qualified for the playoffs. He started in all three Titans playoff games at right guard, blocking for Henry as he ran for nearly 200 yards in each of the first two games before the Titans lost to the Kansas City Chiefs in the AFC Championship.

Davis was made the starting right guard for the 2020 season, and started all 16 games, blocking for Henry as he won his second rushing yards title and became the eighth player in NFL history to run for 2000 yards in a season. The Titans won the AFC South and finished with an 11-5 record. In the playoffs, Davis started for the Titans during their wildcard round for against the Baltimore Ravens.

Davis returned as the starting right guard for the 2021 and 2022 seasons, starting 14 and 12 games, respectively. On December 23, 2022, Davis was placed on injured reserve after suffering an ankle injury.

=== Chicago Bears ===
On March 15, 2023, Davis signed a three-year, $30 million contract with the Chicago Bears.

After starting the first two games at right guard, Davis lost his starting role and was a healthy scratch for four games. He was released on November 13, 2024.

== Personal life ==
Nate Davis was born in York, Maine to his parents Ken and Natalie Davis. They later moved to Ashburn, Virginia where Nate grew up. Davis Attended Stone Bridge High School and was a first-team all-state and 5A North All-Region First-team lineman. Davis was a four-year letterman in high school.
