= Ito Smith =

American football player (born 1995)

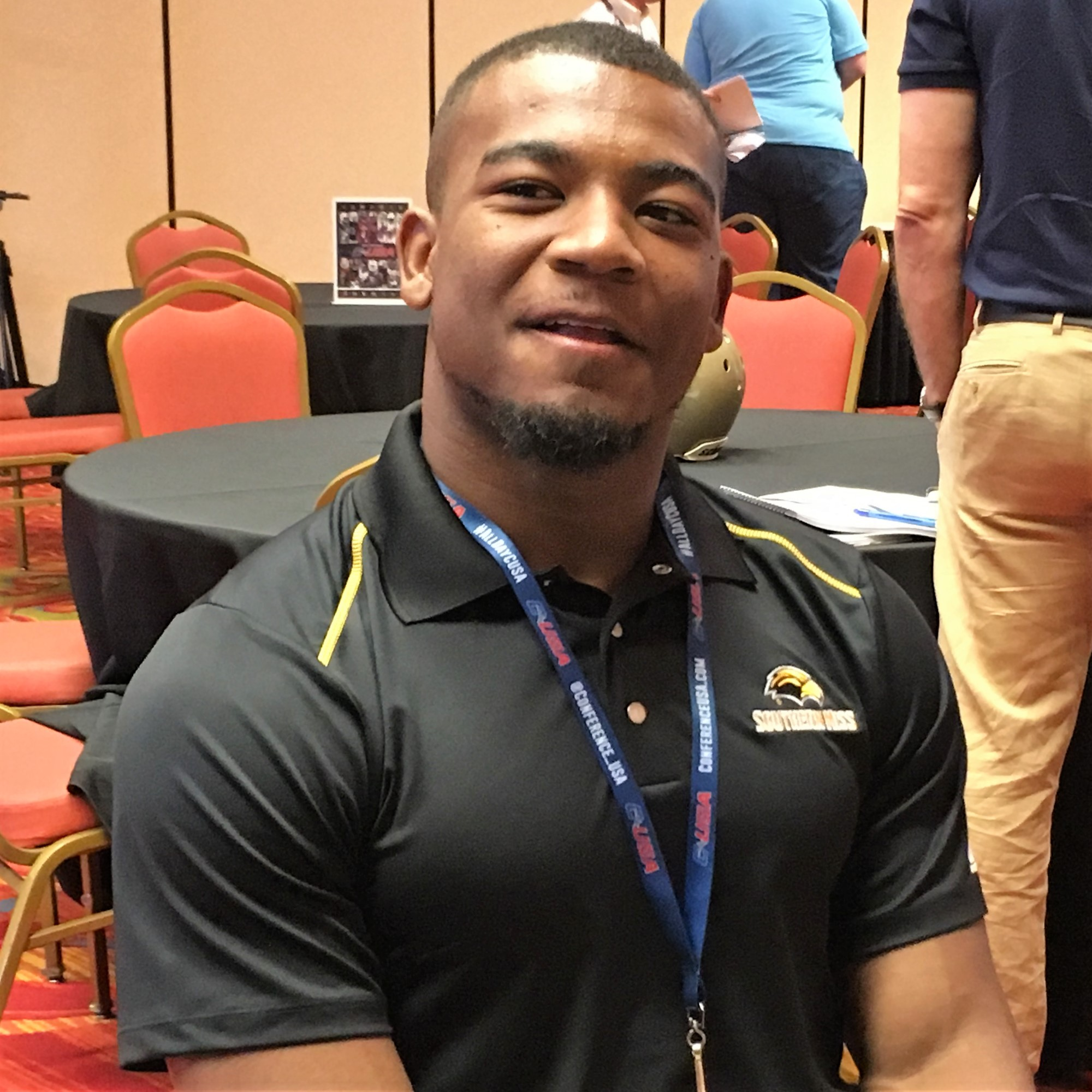
- Smith in 2017

No. 25, 43
- Position: Running back

Personal information
- Born: September 11, 1995 (age 31); Mobile, Alabama, U.S.
- Listed height: 5 ft 9 in (1.75 m)
- Listed weight: 195 lb (88 kg)

Career information
- High school: McGill–Toolen Catholic (Mobile)
- College: Southern Miss (2014–2017)
- NFL draft: 2018: 4th round, 126th overall pick

Career history
- Atlanta Falcons (2018–2020); Arizona Cardinals (2021)*; Minnesota Vikings (2021)*; Dallas Cowboys (2021)
- * Offseason or practice squad member only

Awards and highlights
- First-team All-CUSA (2017)

Career NFL statistics
- Rushing yards: 689
- Rushing average: 3.9
- Rushing touchdowns: 6
- Receptions: 55
- Receiving yards: 314
- Return yards: 59
- Stats at Pro Football Reference

Romarius "Ito" Smith (born September 11, 1995) is an American former professional football player who was a running back in the National Football League (NFL). Smith was selected by the Atlanta Falcons in the fourth round of the 2018 NFL draft, and played three seasons for the Falcons in the NFL. He played college football for the Southern Miss Golden Eagles.

== Early life ==
Smith attended and played high school football at McGill–Toolen Catholic High School. As a result of his high school career playing for the Yellow Jackets, he was named as a three-star prospect by 247Sports and a two-star prospect according to Rivals.com and Scout.com. He committed to Southern Miss to play football over offers from Duke, Georgia Tech, Louisiana Tech, and Western Kentucky, among others.

== College career ==
As a sophomore in 2015, he rushed for 1,128 yards and 10 touchdowns and caught 49 passes for 515 yards. His average of 134 yards of total offense per game in 2015 ranked 18th among Football Bowl Subdivision players.

In July 2016, Smith was named to the watch list for the Maxwell Award. In September 2016, he set a school record with an 86-yard touchdown run against Savannah State.

During his college career, he rushed for 4,538 yards and 42 rushing touchdowns.

=== Collegiate statistics ===
| Year | Team | Conf | Class | rowspan="2" Pos | G | Rushing | | | | Receiving | | | |
| Year | Team | Conf | Class | Att | G | Yds | Avg | TD | Rec | Yds | Avg | TD | |
|---|---|---|---|---|---|---|---|---|---|---|---|---|---|
| 2014 | Southern Miss | CUSA | FR | RB | 11 | 136 | 536 | 3.9 | 2 | 8 | 76 | 9.5 | 0 |
| 2015 | Southern Miss | CUSA | SO | RB | 14 | 171 | 1,128 | 6.6 | 10 | 49 | 515 | 10.5 | 3 |
| 2016 | Southern Miss | CUSA | JR | RB | 13 | 265 | 1,459 | 5.5 | 17 | 43 | 459 | 10.7 | 2 |
| 2017 | Southern Miss | CUSA | SR | RB | 13 | 248 | 1,415 | 5.7 | 13 | 40 | 396 | 9.9 | 2 |
| Career | | | | | 51 | 820 | 4,538 | 5.5 | 42 | 140 | 1,446 | 10.3 | 7 |

== Professional career ==
Pre-draft measurables
| Height | Weight | 40-yard dash | 10-yard split | 20-yard split | 20-yard shuttle | Three-cone drill | Vertical jump | Broad jump | Bench press |
|---|---|---|---|---|---|---|---|---|---|
| 5 ft 8 5/8 in (1.74 m) | 200 lb (91 kg) | 4.45 s | 1.57 s | 2.58 s | 4.56 s | 7.22 s | 36 1/2 in (0.93 m) | 9 ft 11 in (3.02 m) | 22 reps |
All values from NFL Combine

=== Atlanta Falcons ===
==== 2018 season ====
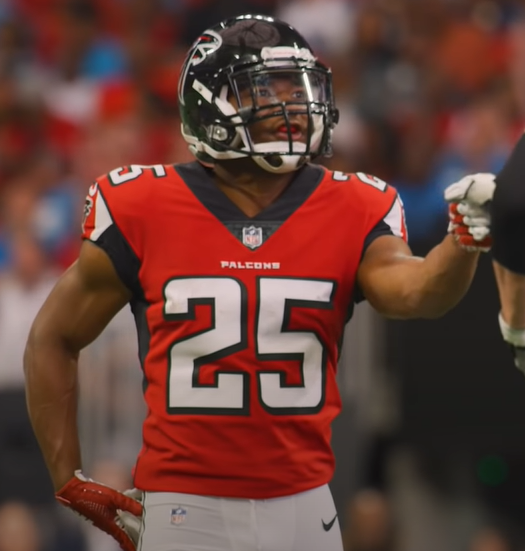
Smith in 2018

Smith was drafted by the Atlanta Falcons in the fourth round (126th overall) of the 2018 NFL draft. He was named the third running back on the depth chart behind Devonta Freeman and Tevin Coleman to start the season. Smith made his NFL debut in the Falcons' Week 2 victory over the Carolina Panthers. He had nine carries for 46 rushing yards and an eight-yard reception in the 31–24 victory. In Week 4, against the Cincinnati Bengals, Smith scored his first NFL touchdown, a 7-yard rush in the first quarter. In Week 5, a 41–17 loss to the Pittsburgh Steelers, he scored his second rushing touchdown of the season. In Week 6, against the Tampa Bay Buccaneers, he recorded his third rushing touchdown, and become the first rookie in franchise history to score rushing touchdowns in three consecutive games. In Week 8 against the Washington Redskins, he scored his fourth rushing touchdown of the season as part of a 60-yard performance in the victory. On December 17, 2018, Smith was placed on injured reserve with a knee injury. He finished the season with 315 rushing yards and four rushing touchdowns along with 27 receptions for 152 receiving yards.

==== 2019 season ====
Smith entered the 2019 season as the No. 2 running back behind Devonta Freeman after Tevin Coleman left in free agency. He played in seven games before suffering a concussion in Week 7. He was placed on injured reserve on November 9, 2019. Smith finished the 2019 season with 22 carries for 106 rushing yards and one rushing touchdown to go along with 11 receptions for 87 receiving yards.

==== 2020 season ====
Smith entered the 2020 season as the No. 3 running back behind newly acquired running back Todd Gurley and Brian Hill. Smith became the starting running back for the final few weeks of the season after Gurley became less effective and interim head coach Raheem Morris wanting to give Smith a good look. He finished the 2020 season with 63 carries for 268 rushing yards and one rushing touchdown to go along with 17 receptions for 75 receiving yards in 14 games.

Smith was waived on April 15, 2021, after three seasons with the team.

=== Arizona Cardinals ===
On August 7, 2021, Smith signed with the Arizona Cardinals. He was waived by the Cardinals on August 16.

=== Minnesota Vikings ===
On August 23, 2021, Smith signed with the Minnesota Vikings. He was waived by Minnesota on August 28, during final roster cuts.

=== Dallas Cowboys ===
On December 8, 2021, Smith was signed to the practice squad of the Dallas Cowboys. The signing reunited him with defensive coordinator Dan Quinn, who was his head coach with the Falcons. In Week 18 with the starters resting for the playoffs, Dallas elevated him for the season finale against the Philadelphia Eagles, where he scored his first and only touchdown of the year on a four-yard rush. He signed a reserve/future contract with the Cowboys on January 18, 2022. Smith was released on March 11.

== Personal life ==
Smith has earned the nickname "The Judge" after Lance Ito.
