= Korey Robertson =

American football player (born 1995)

No. 18
- Position: Wide receiver

Personal information
- Born: June 22, 1995 (age 31); Greenwood, Mississippi
- Listed height: 6 ft 2 in (1.88 m)
- Listed weight: 210 lb (95 kg)

Career information
- High school: Greenwood (Greenwood, Mississippi)
- College: Southern Miss
- NFL draft: 2018: undrafted

Career history
- Minnesota Vikings (2018)*; Salt Lake Stallions (2019)*; Seattle Dragons (2020)*
- * Offseason or practice squad member only

Awards and highlights
- 2017 C-USA First-team

Korey Deuntae Robertson (born June 22, 1995) is an American former football wide receiver. He played college football at Southern Miss.

== Early life ==
Robertson attended Greenwood High School in Greenwood, Mississippi. As a senior, he had 50 receptions for 775 yards and six touchdowns. For his high school career, he caught 147 passes for 2,340 yards and 26 touchdowns. Robertson committed to play football for the Southern Miss Golden Eagles in June 2013.

== College career ==
Robertson did not play as a true freshman in 2014 and chose to redshirt.

As a redshirt freshman in 2015, Robertson played in all 14 of Southern Mississippi's games, catching 14 passes for 200 yards and three touchdowns.

In 2016, Robertson appeared in all 13 games of the season. He had 37 receptions for 437 yards and three touchdowns.

As a redshirt junior in 2017, Robertson broke out, and once again appeared in all 13 games. He caught 76 passes for 1,106 yards and 12 touchdowns. He was named to the C-USA's 2017 First-team. After the season, Robertson declared for the 2018 NFL draft.

== Professional career ==
=== Minnesota Vikings ===
Robertson signed with the Minnesota Vikings as an undrafted free agent on April 30, 2018. He was waived on August 31, 2018.

=== Salt Lake Stallions ===
On November 9, 2018, Robertson signed with the Salt Lake Stallions of the Alliance of American Football (AAF) for the 2019 season. He was released before the start of the regular season.

=== Seattle Dragons ===
Robertson signed with the Seattle Dragons of the XFL during training camp in 2020. He was waived during final roster cuts on January 22, 2020.
