= 2018 in American football =

== 2017–18 NCAA football bowl games ==
- December 16, 2017 – January 8, 2018: 2017–18 NCAA football bowl games

=== 2017–18 College Football Playoff and Championship Game ===
- December 29, 2017: 2017 Cotton Bowl Classic in Arlington at AT&T Stadium
  - The Ohio State Buckeyes defeated the USC Trojans, 24–7.
- December 30, 2017: 2017 Fiesta Bowl in Glendale at University of Phoenix Stadium
  - The Penn State Nittany Lions defeated the Washington Huskies, 35–28.
- December 30, 2017: 2017 Orange Bowl in Miami Gardens at Hard Rock Stadium
  - The Wisconsin Badgers defeated the Miami Hurricanes, 34–24.
- January 1: 2018 Peach Bowl in Atlanta at Mercedes-Benz Stadium
  - The UCF Knights defeated the Auburn Tigers, 34–27.
- January 1: 2018 Rose Bowl in Pasadena at Rose Bowl
  - The Georgia Bulldogs defeated the Oklahoma Sooners, 54–48.
- January 1: 2018 Sugar Bowl in New Orleans at Mercedes-Benz Superdome
  - The Alabama Crimson Tide defeated the Clemson Tigers, 24–6.
- January 8: 2018 College Football Playoff National Championship in Atlanta at Mercedes-Benz Stadium
  - The Alabama Crimson Tide defeated the Georgia Bulldogs, 26–23, to win the national championship.

=== 2017–18 Non-CFP bowl games ===
- December 16, 2017: 2017 New Orleans Bowl in New Orleans at Mercedes-Benz Superdome
  - The Troy Trojans defeated the North Texas Mean Green, 50–30.
- December 16, 2017: 2017 Cure Bowl in Orlando at Camping World Stadium
  - The Georgia State Panthers defeated the Western Kentucky Hilltoppers, 27–17.
- December 16, 2017: 2017 Las Vegas Bowl in Las Vegas at Sam Boyd Stadium
  - The Boise State Broncos defeated the Oregon Ducks, 38–28.
- December 16, 2017: 2017 New Mexico Bowl in Albuquerque at Dreamstyle Stadium
  - The Marshall Thundering Herd defeated the Colorado State Rams, 31–28.
- December 16, 2017: 2017 Camellia Bowl in Montgomery at Cramton Bowl
  - The Middle Tennessee Blue Raiders defeated the Arkansas State Red Wolves, 35–30.
- December 19, 2017: 2017 Boca Raton Bowl in Boca Raton at FAU Stadium
  - The Florida Atlantic Owls defeated the Akron Zips, 50–3.
- December 20, 2017: 2017 Frisco Bowl in Frisco at Toyota Stadium
  - The Louisiana Tech Bulldogs defeated the SMU Mustangs, 51–10.
- December 21, 2017: 2017 Gasparilla Bowl in St. Petersburg at Tropicana Field
  - The Temple Owls defeated the FIU Panthers, 28–3.
- December 22, 2017: 2017 Bahamas Bowl in Nassau at Thomas Robinson Stadium
  - The Ohio Bobcats defeated the UAB Blazers, 41–6.
- December 22, 2017: 2017 Famous Idaho Potato Bowl in Boise at Albertsons Stadium
  - The Wyoming Cowboys defeated the Central Michigan Chippewas, 37–14.
- December 23, 2017: 2017 Birmingham Bowl in Birmingham at Legion Field
  - The South Florida Bulls defeated the Texas Tech Red Raiders, 38–34.
- December 23, 2017: 2017 Armed Forces Bowl in Fort Worth at Amon G. Carter Stadium
  - The Army Black Knights defeated the San Diego State Aztecs, 42–35.
- December 23, 2017: 2017 Dollar General Bowl in Mobile at Ladd–Peebles Stadium
  - The Appalachian State Mountaineers defeated the Toledo Rockets, 34–0.
- December 24, 2017: 2017 Hawaii Bowl in Honolulu at Aloha Stadium
  - The Fresno State Bulldogs defeated the Houston Cougars, 26–20.
- December 26, 2017: 2017 Cactus Bowl in Phoenix at Chase Field
  - The Kansas State Wildcats defeated the UCLA Bruins, 35–17.
- December 26, 2017: 2017 Quick Lane Bowl in Detroit at Ford Field
  - The Duke Blue Devils defeated the Northern Illinois Huskies, 36–14.
- December 26, 2017: 2017 Heart of Dallas Bowl in Dallas at Cotton Bowl
  - The Utah Utes defeated the West Virginia Mountaineers, 30–14.
- December 27, 2017: 2017 Independence Bowl in Shreveport at Independence Stadium
  - The Florida State Seminoles defeated the Southern Miss Golden Eagles, 42–13.
- December 27, 2017: 2017 Pinstripe Bowl in The Bronx (New York City) at Yankee Stadium
  - The Iowa Hawkeyes defeated the Boston College Eagles, 27–20.
- December 27, 2017: 2017 Texas Bowl in Houston at NRG Stadium
  - The Texas Longhorns defeated the Missouri Tigers, 33–16.
- December 27, 2017: 2017 Foster Farms Bowl in Santa Clara at Levi's Stadium
  - The Purdue Boilermakers defeated the Arizona Wildcats, 38–35.
- December 28, 2017: 2017 Military Bowl in Annapolis at Navy–Marine Corps Memorial Stadium
  - The Navy Midshipmen defeated the Virginia Cavaliers, 49–7.
- December 28, 2017: 2017 Camping World Bowl in Orlando at Camping World Stadium
  - The Oklahoma State Cowboys defeated the Virginia Tech Hokies, 30–21.
- December 28, 2017: 2017 Alamo Bowl in San Antonio at Alamodome
  - The TCU Horned Frogs defeated the Stanford Cardinal, 39–37.
- December 28, 2017: 2017 Holiday Bowl in San Diego at SDCCU Stadium
  - The Michigan State Spartans defeated the Washington State Cougars, 42–17.
- December 29, 2017: 2017 Belk Bowl in Charlotte at Bank of America Stadium
  - The Wake Forest Demon Deacons defeated the Texas A&M Aggies, 55–52.
- December 29, 2017: 2017 Sun Bowl in El Paso at Sun Bowl
  - The NC State Wolfpack defeated the Arizona State Sun Devils, 52–31.
- December 29, 2017: 2017 Music City Bowl in Nashville at Nissan Stadium
  - The Northwestern Wildcats defeated the Kentucky Wildcats, 24–23.
- December 29, 2017: 2017 Arizona Bowl in Tucson at Arizona Stadium
  - The New Mexico State Aggies defeated the Utah State Aggies, 26–20.
- December 30, 2017: 2017 TaxSlayer Bowl in Jacksonville at EverBank Field
  - The Mississippi State Bulldogs defeated the Louisville Cardinals, 31–27.
- December 30, 2017: 2017 Liberty Bowl in Memphis at Liberty Bowl Memorial Stadium
  - The Iowa State Cyclones defeated the Memphis Tigers, 21–20.
- January 1, 2018: 2018 Outback Bowl in Tampa at Raymond James Stadium
  - The South Carolina Gamecocks defeated the Michigan Wolverines, 26–19.
- January 1, 2018: 2018 Citrus Bowl in Orlando at Camping World Stadium
  - The Notre Dame Fighting Irish defeated the LSU Tigers, 21–17.

== National Football League ==
- January 28: 2018 Pro Bowl in Orlando at Camping World Stadium
  - The AFC defeated the NFC, 24–23.
  - Offensive MVP: Delanie Walker (Tennessee Titans)
  - Defensive MVP: Von Miller (Denver Broncos)
- February 4: Super Bowl LII in Minneapolis at U.S. Bank Stadium
  - The Philadelphia Eagles defeated the New England Patriots, 41–33, to win their first Super Bowl title.
- April 26–28: 2018 NFL draft in Arlington at AT&T Stadium
  - #1 pick: Baker Mayfield (to the Cleveland Browns from the Oklahoma Sooners)
- September 6 – December 30: 2018 NFL season
  - AFC Regular Season winners: Kansas City Chiefs
  - NFC Regular Season winners: New Orleans Saints

== International Federation of American Football and other American football events ==
- June 14 – 24: 2018 World University American Football Championship in Harbin
  - Mexico defeated Japan, 39–3, in the final. United States took third place.
- July 14 – 23: 2018 Men's IFAF U-19 World Championship in Mexico City
  - Canada defeated Mexico, 13–7, to win their second consecutive and third overall Men's IFAF U-19 World Championship title.
  - United States took third place.
- August 9 – 12: 2018 IFAF Flag Football World Championship in Panama City
  - Men: United States defeated Austria, 19–13, to win their third consecutive and fourth overall Men's IFAF Flag Football World Championship title.
    - Denmark took third place.
  - Women: United States defeated Panama, 27–12, to win their first Women's IFAF Flag Football World Championship title.
    - Canada took third place.

== IFAF Europe ==
- April 14 – June 10: 2018 BIG6 European Football League
  - The New Yorker Lions defeated fellow German team, the Frankfurt Universe, 20–19, to win their fourth consecutive and sixth overall league championship at Eurobowl XXXII.
- July 28 – August 5: 2018 European Championship of American football in Vantaa
  - France defeated Austria, 28–14, to win their first European Championship of American football title.
  - Finland took third place.

== Other leagues ==
- January 25: Vince McMahon announces a relaunch of the XFL to begin play in winter 2020.
- March 20: Charlie Ebersol announces the launch of the Alliance of American Football to begin play in winter 2019.
