= 2017 UTEP Miners football team =

American college football season

2017 UTEP Miners football
- Conference: Conference USA
- West Division
- Record: 0–12 (0–8 C-USA)
- Head coach: Sean Kugler (5th season; first 5 games); Mike Price (interim; final 7 games)
- Offensive coordinator: Brent Pease (2nd season; first 3 games); Brian Natkin (interim; final 9 games)
- Offensive scheme: Multiple
- Defensive coordinator: Tom Mason (2nd season)
- Base defense: 3–4
- Home stadium: Sun Bowl Stadium

2017 Conference USA football standings
	Conf.			Overall
Team	W		L	W		L
East Division
Florida Atlantic x$	8	–	0	11	–	3
FIU	5	–	3	8	–	5
Marshall	4	–	4	8	–	5
Middle Tennessee	4	–	4	7	–	6
Western Kentucky	4	–	4	6	–	7
Old Dominion	3	–	5	5	–	7
Charlotte	1	–	7	1	–	11
West Division
North Texas x	7	–	1	9	–	5
Southern Miss	6	–	2	8	–	5
UAB	6	–	2	8	–	5
Louisiana Tech	4	–	4	7	–	6
UTSA	3	–	5	6	–	5
Rice	1	–	7	1	–	11
UTEP	0	–	8	0	–	12
Championship: Florida Atlantic 41, North Texas 17
$ – Conference champion; x – Division champion/co-champions; Rankings from AP Poll

The 2017 UTEP Miners football team represented the University of Texas at El Paso (UTEP) as a member of the West Division in Conference USA (C-USA) during the 2017 NCAA Division I FCS football season. The Miners compiled an overall record of 0–12 with a mark of 0–8 in conference play, placing last out of seven teams in C-USA's West Division. UTEP was led by fifth-year head coach Sean Kugler until his resignation on October 2, and then by interim head coach Mike Price, who had previously served at UTEP's head coach from 2004 to 2012. The team played home games at the Sun Bowl in El Paso, Texas.

UTEP went winless for the first time since the 1973 season. The Miners averaged 19,548 fans per game.

Senior offensive guard Will Hernandez was named first-team All-C-USA, and was a second-round draft pick in the 2018 NFL draft, selected 34th overall by the New York Giants. Hernandez was the second guard taken in his draft class, after only Quenton Nelson of Notre Dame.

== Schedule ==
UTEP announced its 2017 football schedule on January 26, 2017. The 2017 schedule consists of five home and seven away games.

Date	Time	Opponent	Site	TV	Result	Attendance
September 2	1:30 p.m.	at No. 7 Oklahoma*	Gaylord Family Oklahoma Memorial Stadium; Norman, OK	FOX	L 7–56	86,076
September 9	6:00 p.m.	Rice	Sun Bowl; El Paso, TX	CUSA.tv	L 14–31	19,136
September 15	8:15 p.m.	Arizona*	Sun Bowl; El Paso, TX	ESPN	L 16–63	22,133
September 23	6:00 p.m.	at New Mexico State*	Aggie Memorial Stadium; Las Cruces, NM (Battle of I-10)	ESPN3	L 14–41	17,546
September 30	1:30 p.m.	at Army*	Michie Stadium; West Point, NY	CBSSN	L 21–35	31,133
October 7	6:00 p.m.	Western Kentucky^{†}	Sun Bowl; El Paso, TX	CUSA.tv	L 14–15	20,418
October 14	5:00 p.m.	at Southern Miss	M. M. Roberts Stadium; Hattiesburg, MS	Stadium	L 0–24	21,970
October 28	6:00 p.m.	UTSA	Sun Bowl; El Paso, TX	CUSA.tv	L 14–31	19,456
November 4	5:30 p.m.	at Middle Tennessee	Johnny "Red" Floyd Stadium; Murfreesboro, TN	beIN	L 3–30	11,411
November 11	3:00 p.m.	at North Texas	Apogee Stadium; Denton, TX	ESPN3	L 10–45	26,108
November 18	1:00 p.m.	Louisiana Tech	Sun Bowl; El Paso, TX	CUSA.tv	L 21–42	16,597
November 25	11:00 a.m.	at UAB	Legion Field; Birmingham, AL	CUSA.TV	L 7–28	14,505
*Non-conference game; ^{†}Homecoming; Rankings from AP Poll released prior to the game; All times are in Mountain time

== Game summaries ==
=== At No. 7 Oklahoma ===
	1	2	3	4	Total
Miners	7	0	0	0	7
No. 7 Sooners	14	21	14	7	56

Statistics	UTEP	OKLA
First downs	11	35
Total yards	167	676
Rushing yards	73	180
Passing yards	94	496
Turnovers	1	0
Time of possession	25:24	34:36

Team	Category	Player	Statistics
UTEP	Passing	Ryan Metz	10/18, 56 yards
UTEP	Rushing	Walter Dawn Jr.	7 rushes, 56 yards, TD
UTEP	Receiving	Eddie Sinegal	3 receptions, 20 yards
Oklahoma	Passing	Baker Mayfield	19/20, 329 yards, 3 TD
Oklahoma	Rushing	Abdul Adams	7 rushes, 53 yards
Oklahoma	Receiving	Mark Andrews	7 receptions, 134 yards, TD

=== Rice ===
	1	2	3	4	Total
Owls	3	7	7	14	31
Miners	7	0	0	7	14

Statistics	RICE	UTEP
First downs	22	12
Total yards	437	229
Rushing yards	306	26
Passing yards	131	203
Turnovers	1	1
Time of possession	34:22	25:38

Team	Category	Player	Statistics
Rice	Passing	Sam Glaesmann	10/18, 131 yards, TD
Rice	Rushing	Samuel Stewart	16 rushes, 89 yards
Rice	Receiving	Aaron Cephus	1 reception, 52 yards, TD
UTEP	Passing	Ryan Metz	18/33, 203 yards, TD
UTEP	Rushing	Walter Dawn Jr.	9 rushes, 24 yards
UTEP	Receiving	Kavika Johnson	6 receptions, 67 yards

=== Arizona ===
	1	2	3	4	Total
Wildcats	0	35	14	14	63
Miners	0	9	7	0	16

Statistics	ARIZ	UTEP
First downs	29	12
Total yards	501	218
Rushing yards	326	17
Passing yards	175	201
Turnovers	1	2
Time of possession	36:02	23:58

Team	Category	Player	Statistics
Arizona	Passing	Brandon Dawkins	18/21, 155 yards, 3 TD
Arizona	Rushing	Brandon Dawkins	14 rushes, 133 yards, 3 TD
Arizona	Receiving	Tyrell Johnson	4 receptions, 45 yards
UTEP	Passing	Zack Greenlee	11/17, 104 yards, TD, INT
UTEP	Rushing	Kevin Dove	5 rushes, 17 yards
UTEP	Receiving	Terry Juniel	4 receptions, 82 yards

=== At New Mexico State ===
	1	2	3	4	Total
Miners	7	0	0	7	14
Aggies	7	14	13	7	41

Statistics	UTEP	NMSU
First downs	15	21
Total yards	227	462
Rushing yards	135	179
Passing yards	92	283
Turnovers	5	2
Time of possession	30:25	29:35

Team	Category	Player	Statistics
UTEP	Passing	Ryan Metz	6/18, 54 yards, 3 INT
UTEP	Rushing	Quardraiz Wadley	19 rushes, 77 yards
UTEP	Receiving	David Lucero	2 receptions, 29 yards
New Mexico State	Passing	Tyler Rogers	26/43, 283 yards, 2 TD, INT
New Mexico State	Rushing	Larry Rose III	17 rushes, 144 yards, 2 TD
New Mexico State	Receiving	Jaleel Scott	4 receptions, 74 yards

=== At Army ===
	1	2	3	4	Total
Miners	7	7	0	7	21
Black Knights	0	14	14	7	35

Statistics	UTEP	ARMY
First downs	16	22
Total yards	262	433
Rushing yards	152	353
Passing yards	110	80
Turnovers	0	1
Time of possession	28:27	31:33

Team	Category	Player	Statistics
UTEP	Passing	Zack Greenlee	7/13, 88 yards, TD
UTEP	Rushing	Quardraiz Wadley	28 rushes, 156 yards, TD
UTEP	Receiving	Tyler Batson	5 receptions, 80 yards
Army	Passing	Ahmad Bradshaw	3/5, 80 yards, TD
Army	Rushing	Andy Davidson	14 rushes, 100 yards, TD
Army	Receiving	Jordan Asberry	1 reception, 42 yards, TD

=== Western Kentucky ===
	1	2	3	4	Total
Hilltoppers	0	8	7	0	15
Miners	0	14	0	0	14

Statistics	WKU	UTEP
First downs	18	15
Total yards	282	287
Rushing yards	74	163
Passing yards	208	124
Turnovers	0	0
Time of possession	26:58	33:02

Team	Category	Player	Statistics
Western Kentucky	Passing	Mike White	24/37, 208 yards
Western Kentucky	Rushing	Jakairi Moses	19 rushes, 50 yards
Western Kentucky	Receiving	Lucky Jackson	3 receptions, 56 yards
UTEP	Passing	Zack Greenlee	12/22, 124 yards, TD
UTEP	Rushing	Kevin Dove	15 rushes, 69 yards
UTEP	Receiving	Erik Brown	2 receptions, 32 yards

=== At Southern Miss ===
	1	2	3	4	Total
Miners	0	0	0	0	0
Golden Eagles	7	7	0	10	24

Statistics	UTEP	USM
First downs	6	20
Total yards	147	423
Rushing yards	17	202
Passing yards	130	221
Turnovers	3	3
Time of possession	24:48	35:12

Team	Category	Player	Statistics
UTEP	Passing	Ryan Metz	9/17, 67 yards, INT
UTEP	Rushing	Joshua Fields	6 rushes, 13 yards
UTEP	Receiving	Terry Juniel	5 receptions, 46 yards
Southern Miss	Passing	Keon Howard	16/27, 221 yards, TD, 2 INT
Southern Miss	Rushing	Ito Smith	28 rushes, 120 yards, 2 TD
Southern Miss	Receiving	Jaylond Adams	2 receptions, 104 yards, TD

=== UTSA ===
	1	2	3	4	Total
Roadrunners	3	14	7	7	31
Miners	0	14	0	0	14

Statistics	UTSA	UTEP
First downs	22	10
Total yards	393	243
Rushing yards	205	110
Passing yards	188	133
Turnovers	2	2
Time of possession	34:25	25:35

Team	Category	Player	Statistics
UTSA	Passing	Dalton Sturm	18/30, 188 yards, TD, INT
UTSA	Rushing	Tyrell Clay	15 rushes, 71 yards
UTSA	Receiving	Kerry Thomas Jr.	2 receptions, 49 yards, TD
UTEP	Passing	Zack Greenlee	8/29, 133 yards, 2 INT
UTEP	Rushing	Kevin Dove	9 rushes, 46 yards
UTEP	Receiving	Erik Brown	3 receptions, 52 yards

=== At Middle Tennessee ===
	1	2	3	4	Total
Miners	0	0	3	0	3
Blue Raiders	10	7	7	6	30

Statistics	UTEP	MTSU
First downs	6	18
Total yards	137	400
Rushing yards	89	210
Passing yards	48	190
Turnovers	0	1
Time of possession	30:07	29:53

Team	Category	Player	Statistics
UTEP	Passing	Ryan Metz	10/23, 48 yards
UTEP	Rushing	Joshua Fields	17 rushes, 87 yards
UTEP	Receiving	Warren Redix	3 receptions, 19 yards
Middle Tennessee	Passing	Brent Stockstill	13/30, 190 yards, 3 TD, INT
Middle Tennessee	Rushing	Tavares Thomas	9 rushes, 68 yards, TD
Middle Tennessee	Receiving	Ty Lee	6 receptions, 80 yards, TD

=== At North Texas ===
	1	2	3	4	Total
Miners	7	0	3	0	10
Mean Green	7	7	14	17	45

Statistics	UTEP	UNT
First downs	15	27
Total yards	231	472
Rushing yards	100	259
Passing yards	131	213
Turnovers	1	1
Time of possession	31:38	28:22

Team	Category	Player	Statistics
UTEP	Passing	Zack Greenlee	13/25, 109 yards, INT
UTEP	Rushing	Joshua Fields	16 rushes, 45 yards
UTEP	Receiving	Terry Juniel	4 receptions, 38 yards
North Texas	Passing	Mason Fine	23/35, 213 yards, 4 TD
North Texas	Rushing	Jeff Wilson	20 rushes, 144 yards, TD
North Texas	Receiving	Rico Bussey	3 receptions, 65 yards, TD

=== Louisiana Tech ===
	1	2	3	4	Total
Bulldogs	7	21	0	14	42
Miners	0	0	14	7	21

Statistics	LT	UTEP
First downs	28	18
Total yards	546	410
Rushing yards	343	164
Passing yards	203	246
Turnovers	2	3
Time of possession	32:24	27:36

Team	Category	Player	Statistics
Louisiana Tech	Passing	J'Mar Smith	15/28, 203 yards, 2 TD
Louisiana Tech	Rushing	Jaqwis Dancy	14 rushes, 135 yards, TD
Louisiana Tech	Receiving	Teddy Veal	6 receptions, 66 yards, TD
UTEP	Passing	Ryan Metz	8/16, 187 yards, 2 TD, 2 INT
UTEP	Rushing	Joshua Fields	23 rushes, 137 yards, TD
UTEP	Receiving	Tyler Batson	2 receptions, 94 yards, TD

=== At UAB ===
	1	2	3	4	Total
Miners	7	0	0	0	7
Blazers	3	11	14	0	28

Statistics	UTEP	UAB
First downs	10	23
Total yards	208	334
Rushing yards	101	175
Passing yards	107	159
Turnovers	2	0
Time of possession	26:49	33:11

Team	Category	Player	Statistics
UTEP	Passing	Zack Greenlee	8/18, 107 yards, TD, 2 INT
UTEP	Rushing	Kevin Dove	11 rushes, 36 yards
UTEP	Receiving	Tyler Batson	2 receptions, 54 yards
UAB	Passing	A. J. Erdely	15/25, 159 yards, 2 TD
UAB	Rushing	Spencer Brown	22 rushes, 98 yards
UAB	Receiving	Collin Lisa	7 receptions, 76 yards, TD
