= 2017 Conference USA Football Championship Game =

2017 Dynacraft Conference USA Football Championship Game
- Conference Championship
North Texas Mean Green	Florida Atlantic Owls
(9–3)	(9–3)
17	41
Head coach: Seth Littrell	Head coach: Lane Kiffin
	1	2	3	4	Total
North Texas	0	0	9	8	17
Florida Atlantic	10	17	7	7	41
- Date: December 2, 2017
- Season: 2017
- Stadium: FAU Stadium
- Location: Boca Raton, Florida
- MVP: Kalib Woods (WR, FAU)
- Favorite: FAU by 10.5
- Referee: Dan Gautreaux
- Attendance: 14,258

United States TV coverage
- Network: ESPN2 & TuneIn
- Announcers: Jason Benetti, Kelly Stouffer and Kris Budden (ESPN2); TJ Rives, Jay Mize (Tag Sports Group on TuneIn)

2017 Conference USA football standings
	Conf.			Overall
Team	W		L	W		L
East Division
Florida Atlantic x$	8	–	0	11	–	3
FIU	5	–	3	8	–	5
Marshall	4	–	4	8	–	5
Western Kentucky	4	–	4	6	–	7
Middle Tennessee	4	–	4	7	–	6
Old Dominion	3	–	5	5	–	7
Charlotte	1	–	7	1	–	11
West Division
North Texas x	7	–	1	9	–	5
UAB	6	–	2	8	–	5
Southern Miss	6	–	2	8	–	5
Louisiana Tech	4	–	4	7	–	6
UTSA	3	–	5	6	–	5
Rice	1	–	7	1	–	11
UTEP	0	–	8	0	–	12
Championship: Florida Atlantic 41, North Texas 17
$ – Conference champion; x – Division champion/co-champions; Rankings from AP Poll

The 2017 Conference USA Championship Game was played on Saturday, December 2, 2017, at FAU Stadium in Boca Raton, Florida, and determined the 2017 football champion of Conference USA (C-USA). The game was played between Florida Atlantic, the East Division champion, and North Texas, the West Division champion. The title sponsor was Dynacraft BSC.

In the 2016 championship game, hosted by WKU, the Hilltoppers had defeated Louisiana Tech 58–44. The 2017 championship game was the 13th game in the championship series and was won by Florida Atlantic, 41–17.

== Teams ==
=== North Texas Mean Green ===
North Texas secured its spot in the title game on November 11 with a decisive 45–10 victory over UTEP.

=== Florida Atlantic Owls ===
Florida Atlantic clinched the East division on November 18 after defeating rivals FIU 52-24 in the Shula Bowl. The win also guaranteed that the Owls would host the championship game. At the time, FAU held a 7–0 record in Conference USA play, while North Texas stood at 6–1, with both teams having one conference game remaining. Even if FAU lost and North Texas won, resulting in a tie, the Owls held the head-to-head tiebreaker thanks to their regular-season victory over the Mean Green.

== Aftermath ==
North Texas advanced to the 2017 New Orleans Bowl, where they were defeated by Troy. Florida Atlantic participated in the 2017 Boca Raton Bowl, securing a victory over Akron.

If the winner of the C-USA Championship Game was one of the highest in the rankings of the "Group of Five" conferences, the team could have been placed in the College Football Playoff or a "New Year's Six" bowl. Otherwise, the conference champion would supposedly choose which game to attend, from those with ties to the conference. However, FAU athletic director Pat Chun said that FAU did not choose the Boca Raton Bowl, but that FAU was told where to go by the conference.

== Game summary ==
=== Scoring summary ===
Scoring summary

Quarter	Time	Drive			Team	Scoring information	Score	
Quarter	Time	Plays	Yards	TOP	Team	Scoring information	UNT	FAU
1	12:19	9	65	2:41	FAU	24-yard field goal by Greg Joseph	0	3
1	10:11	2	71	0:32	FAU	John Franklin III 22-yard touchdown reception from Kamrin Solomon, Greg Joseph kick good	0	10
2	14:55	6	64	1:55	FAU	Devin Singletary 3-yard touchdown run, Greg Joseph kick good	0	17
2	9:56	11	80	3:36	FAU	21-yard field goal by Greg Joseph	0	20
2	4:43	9	50	2:54	FAU	Devin Singletary 5-yard touchdown run, Greg Joseph kick good	0	27
3	12:21	3	74	1:10	FAU	Kalib Woods 54-yard touchdown reception from Jason Driskel, Greg Joseph kick good	0	34
3	5:50	16	73	6:31	UNT	26-yard field goal by Trevor Moore	3	34
3	4:47	1	77	0:33	UNT	Turner Smiley 77-yard touchdown reception from Mason Fine, 2-point pass by Mason Fine failed	9	34
4	10:32	7	62	2:27	UNT	Evan Johnson 1-yard touchdown run, 2-point pass from Rico Bussey good	17	34
4	5:27	10	71	5:05	FAU	Devin Singletary 5-yard touchdown run, Greg Joseph kick good	17	41
"TOP" = time of possession. For other American football terms, see Glossary of American football.							17	41

=== Statistics ===
Statistics	UNT	FAU
First downs	26	22
Plays–yards	80-437	72-633
Rushes–yards	35-81	42-281
Passing yards	356	352
Passing: Comp–Att–Int	28-45-2	18-30-0
Time of possession	31:32	28:09
