= 2017 Rice Owls football team =

American college football season

2017 Rice Owls football
- Conference: Conference USA
- West Division
- Record: 1–11 (1–7 C-USA)
- Head coach: David Bailiff (11th season)
- Offensive coordinator: Billy Lynch (4th season)
- Offensive scheme: Spread
- Defensive coordinator: Brian Stewart (1st season)
- Base defense: 3–4
- Home stadium: Rice Stadium

2017 Conference USA football standings
	Conf.			Overall
Team	W		L	W		L
East Division
Florida Atlantic x$	8	–	0	11	–	3
FIU	5	–	3	8	–	5
Marshall	4	–	4	8	–	5
Middle Tennessee	4	–	4	7	–	6
Western Kentucky	4	–	4	6	–	7
Old Dominion	3	–	5	5	–	7
Charlotte	1	–	7	1	–	11
West Division
North Texas x	7	–	1	9	–	5
Southern Miss	6	–	2	8	–	5
UAB	6	–	2	8	–	5
Louisiana Tech	4	–	4	7	–	6
UTSA	3	–	5	6	–	5
Rice	1	–	7	1	–	11
UTEP	0	–	8	0	–	12
Championship: Florida Atlantic 41, North Texas 17
$ – Conference champion; x – Division champion/co-champions; Rankings from AP Poll

The 2017 Rice Owls football team represented Rice University in the 2017 NCAA Division I FBS football season. The Owls played their home games at the Rice Stadium in Houston, Texas, and competed in the West Division of Conference USA (C–USA). They were led by eleventh-year head coach David Bailiff. They finished the season 1–11, 1–7 in C-USA play to finish in sixth place in the West Division.

On November 27, head coach David Bailiff was fired. He finished at Rice with an 11-year record of 57–80.

== Schedule ==
Rice announced its 2017 football schedule on January 26, 2017. The 2017 schedule consisted of 5 home, 6 away and 1 neutral site game in the regular season. The Owls hosted CUSA foes FIU, Louisiana Tech, North Texas, and Southern Miss, and traveled to Old Dominion, UAB, UTEP, and UTSA

The Owls hosted one of the four non-conference opponents, Army, who was independent from a conference, and traveled to Houston from the American Athletic Conference and Pittsburgh from the Atlantic Coast Conference. Rice traveled to Sydney, Australia to face Stanford from the Pac-12 Conference.

Date	Time	Opponent	Site	TV	Result	Attendance
August 26	9:00 p.m.	vs. No. 14 Stanford*	(Australia) Allianz Stadium; Sydney, Australia (Sydney Cup)	ESPN	L 7–62	33,101
September 9	7:00 p.m.	at UTEP	Sun Bowl; El Paso, TX	CUSA.TV	W 31–14	19,136
September 16	7:00 p.m.	at Houston*	TDECU Stadium; Houston, TX (rivalry)	ESPN3	L 3–38	38,900
September 23	6:30 p.m.	FIU	Rice Stadium; Houston, TX	Stadium	L 7–13	18,932
September 30	11:00 a.m.	at Pittsburgh*	Heinz Field; Pittsburgh, PA	ACCRSN	L 10–42	33,051
October 7	5:30 p.m.	Army*	Rice Stadium; Houston, TX	beIN	L 12–49	21,766
October 21	6:00 p.m.	at UTSA	Alamodome; San Antonio, TX	STADIUM	L 7–20	25,270
October 28	2:30 p.m.	Louisiana Tech	Rice Stadium; Houston, TX	FloFootball	L 28–42	19,992
November 4	2:00 p.m.	at UAB	Legion Field; Birmingham, AL		L 21–52	21,224
November 11	2:30 p.m.	Southern Miss^{†}	Rice Stadium; Houston, TX	STADIUM	L 34–43	18,124
November 18	1:00 p.m.	at Old Dominion	Foreman Field; Norfolk, VA (Oyster Bowl)	ESPN3	L 21–24	20,118
November 25	12:00 p.m.	North Texas	Rice Stadium; Houston, TX	ESPN3	L 14–30	17,956
*Non-conference game; ^{†}Homecoming; Rankings from AP Poll released prior to game; All times are in Central time

Schedule source:

== Game summaries ==
=== vs Stanford ===
	1	2	3	4	Total
Owls	0	0	0	7	7
No. 14 Cardinal	21	17	14	10	62

=== At UTEP ===
	1	2	3	4	Total
Owls	3	7	7	14	31
Miners	7	0	0	7	14

=== At Houston ===
	1	2	3	4	Total
Owls	0	0	0	3	3
Cougars	17	21	0	0	38

=== FIU ===
	1	2	3	4	Total
Panthers	0	10	3	0	13
Owls	0	7	0	0	7

=== At Pittsburgh ===
	1	2	3	4	Total
Owls	0	0	10	0	10
Panthers	21	7	0	14	42

=== Army ===
	1	2	3	4	Total
Black Knights	21	14	7	7	49
Owls	0	0	6	6	12

=== At UTSA ===
	1	2	3	4	Total
Owls	0	7	0	0	7
Roadrunners	10	0	10	0	20

=== Louisiana Tech ===
	1	2	3	4	Total
Bulldogs	7	14	7	14	42
Owls	0	7	7	14	28

=== At UAB ===
	1	2	3	4	Total
Owls	0	7	0	14	21
Blazers	21	21	7	3	52

=== Southern Miss ===
	1	2	3	4	Total
Golden Eagles	10	12	14	7	43
Owls	0	14	13	7	34

=== At Old Dominion ===
	1	2	3	4	Total
Owls	7	0	0	14	21
Monarchs	7	3	7	7	24

=== North Texas ===
	1	2	3	4	Total
Mean Green	7	17	3	3	30
Owls	7	7	0	0	14
