= 2017 UTSA Roadrunners football team =

American college football season

2017 UTSA Roadrunners football
- Conference: Conference USA
- West Division
- Record: 6–5 (3–5 C-USA)
- Head coach: Frank Wilson (2nd season)
- Offensive coordinator: Frank Scelfo (2nd season)
- Offensive scheme: Multiple
- Defensive coordinator: Pete Golding (2nd season)
- Base defense: 4–2–5
- Home stadium: Alamodome

2017 Conference USA football standings
	Conf.			Overall
Team	W		L	W		L
East Division
Florida Atlantic x$	8	–	0	11	–	3
FIU	5	–	3	8	–	5
Marshall	4	–	4	8	–	5
Middle Tennessee	4	–	4	7	–	6
Western Kentucky	4	–	4	6	–	7
Old Dominion	3	–	5	5	–	7
Charlotte	1	–	7	1	–	11
West Division
North Texas x	7	–	1	9	–	5
Southern Miss	6	–	2	8	–	5
UAB	6	–	2	8	–	5
Louisiana Tech	4	–	4	7	–	6
UTSA	3	–	5	6	–	5
Rice	1	–	7	1	–	11
UTEP	0	–	8	0	–	12
Championship: Florida Atlantic 41, North Texas 17
$ – Conference champion; x – Division champion/co-champions; Rankings from AP Poll

The 2017 UTSA Roadrunners football team represented the University of Texas at San Antonio in the 2017 NCAA Division I FBS football season. The Roadrunners played their home games at the Alamodome in San Antonio, TX, and competed in the West Division of Conference USA (C–USA). They were led by second-year head coach Frank Wilson. They finished the season 6–5, 3–5 in C-USA play to finish in fifth place in the West Division. Despite being bowl eligible for the second consecutive season, the Roadrunners did not receive a bowl bid.

== Schedule ==
UTSA announced its 2017 football schedule on January 26, 2017. The 2017 schedule consisted of 6 home and away games in the regular season. The Roadrunners hosted CUSA foes Marshall, Rice, Southern Miss, and UAB, and traveled to FIU, Louisiana Tech, North Texas, and UTEP.

The Roadrunners hosted one of the three non-conference opponents, Southern from the Southwestern Athletic Conference and traveled to Baylor from the Big 12 Conference and Texas State from the Sun Belt Conference. The Roadrunners were to also host the season opener against Houston from the American Athletic Conference but the game was canceled due to Hurricane Harvey.

The Roadrunners ended the season with their first winning record since 2013, with one of their six wins being a 17–10 victory against Baylor, giving the school its first ever win against a Power Five team.

Date	Time	Opponent	Site	TV	Result	Attendance
September 2^{[a]}	6:00 p.m.	Houston*	Alamodome; San Antonio, TX		Cancelled ^{[a]}	
September 9	7:00 p.m.	at Baylor*	McLane Stadium; Waco, TX	FSN	W 17–10	41,923
September 16	6:00 p.m.	Southern*	Alamodome; San Antonio, TX	KCWX	W 51–17	25,093
September 23	6:30 p.m.	at Texas State*	Bobcat Stadium; San Marcos, TX (I-35 Rivalry)	ESPN3 - KEYE - KMYS	W 44–14	31,333
October 7	6:00 p.m.	Southern Miss	Alamodome; San Antonio, TX	STADIUM - KMYS	L 29–31	23,517
October 14	5:30 p.m.	at North Texas	Apogee Stadium; Denton, TX	ESPN3	L 26–29	23,068
October 21	6:00 p.m.	Rice^{†}	Alamodome; San Antonio, TX	STADIUM - KMYS	W 20–7	25,270
October 28	7:00 p.m.	at UTEP	Sun Bowl; El Paso, TX	KMYS	W 31–14	19,456
November 4	6:00 p.m.	at FIU	Riccardo Silva Stadium; Miami, FL	STADIUM - KMYS	L 7–14	15,874
November 11	6:00 p.m.	UAB	Alamodome; San Antonio, TX	KCWX	L 19–24	20,076
November 18	6:00 p.m.	Marshall	Alamodome; San Antonio, TX	STADIUM - KMYS	W 9–7	20,148
November 25	6:30 p.m.	at Louisiana Tech	Joe Aillet Stadium; Ruston, LA	ESPNU	L 6–20	15,651
*Non-conference game; ^{†}Homecoming; All times are in Central time

^{^[a]}The game between Houston and UTSA was cancelled in the aftermath of Hurricane Harvey.

Schedule source:

== Game summaries ==
=== At Baylor ===
	1	2	3	4	Total
Roadrunners	0	7	7	3	17
Bears	0	7	0	3	10

=== Southern ===
	1	2	3	4	Total
Jaguars	0	0	7	10	17
Roadrunners	21	27	3	0	51

=== At Texas State ===
	1	2	3	4	Total
Roadrunners	10	17	3	14	44
Bobcats	7	7	0	0	14

=== Southern Miss ===
	1	2	3	4	Total
Golden Eagles	7	0	14	10	31
Roadrunners	3	10	0	16	29

=== At North Texas ===
	1	2	3	4	Total
Roadrunners	7	10	3	6	26
Mean Green	16	0	0	13	29

=== Rice ===
	1	2	3	4	Total
Owls	0	7	0	0	7
Roadrunners	10	0	10	0	20

=== At UTEP ===
	1	2	3	4	Total
Roadrunners	3	14	7	7	31
Miners	0	14	0	0	14

=== At FIU ===
	1	2	3	4	Total
Roadrunners	0	0	0	7	7
Panthers	0	0	14	0	14

=== UAB ===
	1	2	3	4	Total
Blazers	14	7	0	3	24
Roadrunners	3	3	0	13	19

=== Marshall ===
	1	2	3	4	Total
Thundering Herd	0	0	0	7	7
Roadrunners	3	3	0	3	9

=== At Louisiana Tech ===
	1	2	3	4	Total
Roadrunners	0	0	3	3	6
Bulldogs	7	7	3	3	20
