= 2017 Western Kentucky Hilltoppers football team =

American college football season

2017 Western Kentucky Hilltoppers football

Cure Bowl, L 17–27 vs. Georgia State
- Conference: Conference USA
- East Division
- Record: 6–7 (4–4 C-USA)
- Head coach: Mike Sanford Jr. (1st season)
- Offensive coordinator: Junior Adams (1st season)
- Offensive scheme: Multiple
- Defensive coordinator: Clayton White (1st season)
- Base defense: 4–2–5
- Home stadium: Houchens Industries–L. T. Smith Stadium

2017 Conference USA football standings
	Conf.			Overall
Team	W		L	W		L
East Division
Florida Atlantic x$	8	–	0	11	–	3
FIU	5	–	3	8	–	5
Marshall	4	–	4	8	–	5
Middle Tennessee	4	–	4	7	–	6
Western Kentucky	4	–	4	6	–	7
Old Dominion	3	–	5	5	–	7
Charlotte	1	–	7	1	–	11
West Division
North Texas x	7	–	1	9	–	5
Southern Miss	6	–	2	8	–	5
UAB	6	–	2	8	–	5
Louisiana Tech	4	–	4	7	–	6
UTSA	3	–	5	6	–	5
Rice	1	–	7	1	–	11
UTEP	0	–	8	0	–	12
Championship: Florida Atlantic 41, North Texas 17
$ – Conference champion; x – Division champion/co-champions; Rankings from AP Poll

The 2017 Western Kentucky Hilltoppers football team (WKU) represented Western Kentucky University in the 2017 NCAA Division I FBS football season. The Hilltoppers played their home games at the Houchens Industries–L. T. Smith Stadium in Bowling Green, Kentucky as members of the East Division of Conference USA (C–USA). They were led by first-year head coach Mike Sanford Jr. The Hilltoppers finished the season 6–7, 4–4 in C-USA play to finish in a tie for third place in the East Division. They received an invite to the Cure Bowl where they lost to Georgia State.

== Preseason ==
On December 5, head coach Jeff Brohm resigned to become the head coach at Purdue. He finished at WKU with a record of 30–10, two bowl wins, and two C-USA titles. Defensive coordinator Nick Holt led WKU in the Boca Raton Bowl. On December 14, the school hired Mike Sanford Jr. as head coach.

In a preseason media vote, the Hilltoppers were picked to win the East Division again, receiving 20 of 28 first place votes.

== Schedule ==
Western Kentucky announced its 2017 football schedule on January 26, 2017. The 2017 schedule consists of 6 home and away games in the regular season. The Hilltoppers will host CUSA foes Charlotte, Florida Atlantic, Louisiana Tech, and Middle Tennessee, and will travel to FIU, Marshall, Old Dominion, and UTEP.

The Hilltoppers will host two of the four non-conference opponents, Ball State from the Mid-American Conference and Eastern Kentucky from the Ohio Valley Conference and travel to Illinois of the Big Ten Conference and Vanderbilt from the Southeastern Conference.

Date	Time	Opponent	Site	TV	Result	Attendance
September 2	6:00 p.m.	Eastern Kentucky*	Houchens Industries–L. T. Smith Stadium; Bowling Green, KY (Battle of the Bluegrass)	FloSports	W 31–17	18,614
September 9	7:00 p.m.	at Illinois*	Memorial Stadium; Champaign, IL	BTN	L 7–20	41,923
September 16	6:00 p.m.	Louisiana Tech	Houchens Industries–L. T. Smith Stadium; Bowling Green, KY	Stadium	L 22–23	16,223
September 23	6:00 p.m.	Ball State*	Houchens Industries–L. T. Smith Stadium; Bowling Green, KY	Stadium	W 33–21	17,590
October 7	7:00 p.m.	at UTEP	Sun Bowl; El Paso, TX	CUSA.TV	W 15–14	20,418
October 14	3:30 p.m.	Charlotte^{†}	Houchens Industries–L. T. Smith Stadium; Bowling Green, KY	FloSports	W 45–14	16,754
October 20	5:00 p.m.	at Old Dominion	Foreman Field; Norfolk, VA	CBSSN	W 35–31	20,118
October 28	3:30 p.m.	Florida Atlantic	Houchens Industries–L. T. Smith Stadium; Bowling Green, KY	Stadium	L 28–42	12,441
November 4	11:00 a.m.	at Vanderbilt*	Vanderbilt Stadium; Nashville, TN	ESPNU	L 17–31	26,350
November 11	5:30 p.m.	at Marshall	Joan C. Edwards Stadium; Huntington, WV	Stadium	L 23–30	19,516
November 17	7:00 p.m.	Middle Tennessee	Houchens Industries–L. T. Smith Stadium; Bowling Green, KY (100 Miles of Hate)	CBSSN	W 41–38 ^{3OT}	12,612
November 24	6:00 p.m.	at FIU	Riccardo Silva Stadium; Miami, FL	beIN	L 17–41	16,199
December 16	2:30 p.m.	vs. Georgia State*	Camping World Stadium; Orlando, FL (Cure Bowl)	CBSSN	L 17–27	19,585
*Non-conference game; ^{†}Homecoming; All times are in Central time

Schedule source:

== Game summaries ==
=== Eastern Kentucky ===
	1	2	3	4	Total
Colonels	0	0	14	3	17
Hilltoppers	0	17	7	7	31

=== At Illinois ===
	1	2	3	4	Total
Hilltoppers	0	0	0	7	7
Fighting Illini	3	10	7	0	20

=== Louisiana Tech ===
	1	2	3	4	Total
Bulldogs	3	10	0	10	23
Hilltoppers	8	7	7	0	22

=== Ball State ===
	1	2	3	4	Total
Cardinals	7	0	7	7	21
Hilltoppers	7	10	0	16	33

=== At UTEP ===
	1	2	3	4	Total
Hilltoppers	0	8	7	0	15
Miners	0	14	0	0	14

=== Charlotte ===
	1	2	3	4	Total
49ers	7	7	0	0	14
Hilltoppers	14	24	0	7	45

=== At Old Dominion ===
	1	2	3	4	Total
Hilltoppers	7	14	0	14	35
Monarchs	7	7	17	0	31

=== Florida Atlantic ===
	1	2	3	4	Total
Owls	10	10	0	22	42
Hilltoppers	7	14	7	0	28

=== At Vanderbilt ===
	1	2	3	4	Total
Hilltoppers	7	7	3	0	17
Commodores	14	7	7	3	31

=== At Marshall ===
	1	2	3	4	Total
Hilltoppers	7	0	3	13	23
Thundering Herd	0	13	17	0	30

=== Middle Tennessee ===
	1	2	3	4	OT	2OT	3OT	Total
Blue Raiders	0	3	0	21	7	7	0	38
Hilltoppers	7	0	3	14	7	7	3	41

=== At FIU ===
	1	2	3	4	Total
Hilltoppers	3	7	7	0	17
Panthers	3	10	21	7	41

=== vs Georgia State–Cure Bowl ===
	1	2	3	4	Total
Hilltoppers	7	3	0	7	17
Panthers	10	3	7	7	27

== Coaching staff ==
Name	Title
Mike Sanford Jr.	Head Coach
Clayton White	Defensive Coordinator
Junior Adams	Offensive Coordinator/Wide Receivers
Steve Spurrier Jr.	Quarterbacks
Mike Sanford Sr.	Special Teams Coordinator/Running Backs
Geoff Dartt	Offensive Line
Jimmy Lindsey	Defensive Line
Jami DeBerry	Safeties/Recruiting Coordinator
Ryan Mahaffey	Tight Ends
Maurice Crum Jr.	Linebackers
