= 2017 Old Dominion Monarchs football team =

American college football season

2017 Old Dominion Monarchs football
- Conference: Conference USA
- East Division
- Record: 5–7 (3–5 C-USA)
- Head coach: Bobby Wilder (9th season)
- Offensive coordinator: Brian Scott (9th season)
- Offensive scheme: Hurry-up spread option
- Defensive coordinator: Rich Nagy (5th season)
- Base defense: 3–3–5
- Home stadium: Foreman Field

2017 Conference USA football standings
	Conf.			Overall
Team	W		L	W		L
East Division
Florida Atlantic x$	8	–	0	11	–	3
FIU	5	–	3	8	–	5
Marshall	4	–	4	8	–	5
Middle Tennessee	4	–	4	7	–	6
Western Kentucky	4	–	4	6	–	7
Old Dominion	3	–	5	5	–	7
Charlotte	1	–	7	1	–	11
West Division
North Texas x	7	–	1	9	–	5
Southern Miss	6	–	2	8	–	5
UAB	6	–	2	8	–	5
Louisiana Tech	4	–	4	7	–	6
UTSA	3	–	5	6	–	5
Rice	1	–	7	1	–	11
UTEP	0	–	8	0	–	12
Championship: Florida Atlantic 41, North Texas 17
$ – Conference champion; x – Division champion/co-champions; Rankings from AP Poll

The 2017 Old Dominion Monarchs football team represented Old Dominion University in the 2017 NCAA Division I FBS football season. The Monarchs played their home games at the Foreman Field in Norfolk, Virginia as members of the East Division of Conference USA (C–USA). They were led by ninth-year head coach Bobby Wilder. The Monarchs finished the season 5–7, 3–5 in C-USA play to finish in sixth place.

== Schedule ==
Old Dominion announced its 2017 football schedule on January 26, 2017. The 2017 schedule consisted of six home and six away games in the regular season. The Monarchs hosted two of the four non-conference opponents, Albany from the Colonial Athletic Association and North Carolina from the Atlantic Coast Conference and traveled to Massachusetts, an independent, and Virginia Tech also from the Atlantic Coast Conference.

Date	Time	Opponent	Site	TV	Result	Attendance
September 2	6:00 p.m.	No. 24 (FCS) Albany*	Foreman Field; Norfolk, VA	ESPN3	W 31–17	20,118
September 9	3:30 p.m.	at Massachusetts*	Warren McGuirk Alumni Stadium; Hadley, MA	ELVN	W 17–7	9,028
September 16	3:30 p.m.	North Carolina*	Foreman Field; Norfolk, VA	Stadium	L 23–53	20,118
September 23	2:00 p.m.	at No. 13 Virginia Tech*	Lane Stadium; Blacksburg, VA	ACCN Extra	L 0–38	65,632
October 7	6:00 p.m.	Florida Atlantic	Foreman Field; Norfolk, VA	Stadium	L 28–58	20,118
October 14	2:30 p.m.	at Marshall	Joan C. Edwards Stadium; Huntington, WV	ESPN3	L 3–35	26,097
October 20	7:00 p.m.	Western Kentucky	Foreman Field; Norfolk, VA	CBSSN	L 31–35	20,118
October 28	6:30 p.m.	at North Texas	Apogee Stadium; Denton, TX	ESPN3	L 38–45	18,872
November 4	3:30 p.m.	Charlotte^{†}	Foreman Field; Norfolk, VA	ESPN3	W 6–0	20,118
November 11	7:00 p.m.	at FIU	Riccardo Silva Stadium; Miami, FL		W 37–30	17,127
November 18	2:00 p.m.	Rice	Foreman Field; Norfolk, VA (Oyster Bowl)	ESPN3	W 24–21	20,118
November 25	3:00 p.m.	at Middle Tennessee	Johnny "Red" Floyd Stadium; Murfreesboro, TN	ESPN3	L 10–41	10,128
*Non-conference game; ^{†}Homecoming; Rankings from AP Poll released prior to the game; All times are in Eastern time

== Game summaries ==
=== Albany ===
	1	2	3	4	Total
No. 24 (FCS) Great Danes	3	0	0	14	17
Monarchs	7	14	3	7	31

=== At Massachusetts ===
	1	2	3	4	Total
Monarchs	3	7	0	7	17
Minutemen	0	0	7	0	7

=== North Carolina ===
	1	2	3	4	Total
Tar Heels	11	28	7	7	53
Monarchs	0	7	10	6	23

=== At Virginia Tech ===
	1	2	3	4	Total
Monarchs	0	0	0	0	0
No. 13 Hokies	3	14	14	7	38

=== Florida Atlantic ===
	1	2	3	4	Total
Owls	17	14	14	13	58
Monarchs	7	7	7	7	28

=== At Marshall ===
	1	2	3	4	Total
Monarchs	0	3	0	0	3
Thundering Herd	0	7	7	21	35

=== WKU ===
	1	2	3	4	Total
Hilltoppers	7	14	0	14	35
Monarchs	7	7	17	0	31

=== At North Texas ===
	1	2	3	4	Total
Monarchs	10	13	15	0	38
Mean Green	14	21	0	10	45

=== Charlotte ===
	1	2	3	4	Total
49ers	0	0	0	0	0
Monarchs	3	0	3	0	6

=== At FIU ===
	1	2	3	4	Total
Monarchs	7	17	7	6	37
Panthers	7	7	9	7	30

=== Rice ===
	1	2	3	4	Total
Owls	7	0	0	14	21
Monarchs	7	3	7	7	24

=== At Middle Tennessee ===
	1	2	3	4	Total
Monarchs	3	0	0	7	10
Blue Raiders	3	21	7	10	41
