= 2017 FIU Panthers football team =

American college football season

2017 FIU Panthers football

Gasparilla Bowl, L 3–28 vs. Temple
- Conference: Conference USA
- East Division
- Record: 8–5 (5–3 C-USA)
- Head coach: Butch Davis (1st season)
- Offensive coordinator: Rich Skrosky (1st season)
- Offensive scheme: Multiple
- Defensive coordinator: Brent Guy (1st season)
- Base defense: 4–3
- Home stadium: Riccardo Silva Stadium

2017 Conference USA football standings
	Conf.			Overall
Team	W		L	W		L
East Division
Florida Atlantic x$	8	–	0	11	–	3
FIU	5	–	3	8	–	5
Marshall	4	–	4	8	–	5
Middle Tennessee	4	–	4	7	–	6
Western Kentucky	4	–	4	6	–	7
Old Dominion	3	–	5	5	–	7
Charlotte	1	–	7	1	–	11
West Division
North Texas x	7	–	1	9	–	5
Southern Miss	6	–	2	8	–	5
UAB	6	–	2	8	–	5
Louisiana Tech	4	–	4	7	–	6
UTSA	3	–	5	6	–	5
Rice	1	–	7	1	–	11
UTEP	0	–	8	0	–	12
Championship: Florida Atlantic 41, North Texas 17
$ – Conference champion; x – Division champion/co-champions; Rankings from AP Poll

The 2017 FIU Panthers football team represented Florida International University in the 2017 NCAA Division I FBS football season. The Panthers played their home games at the Riccardo Silva Stadium in Miami, Florida as members of the East Division of Conference USA (C–USA). They were led by first-year head coach Butch Davis. The Panthers finished the season 8–5, 5–3 in C-USA play to finish in second place in the East Division. They received an invitation to the Gasparilla Bowl where they lost to Temple.

== Spring Game ==
The 2017 Spring Game took place in University Park on April 7, at 7:00 p.m.

Date	Time	Spring Game	Site	TV	Result	Attendance
April 7	7:00 p.m.	Offense vs. Defense	Riccardo Silva Stadium • University Park, FL	CUSA.tv	Offense 17–14	-

== Offseason ==
Following the conclusion of the 2016 season, several Panthers were invited to participate in postseason all-star games. Invitations include: Trey Hendrickson (DE) participating in the East–West Shrine Game on January 21, 2017, Imarjaye Albury (DT) participating in the NFLPA Collegiate Bowl on January 21, 2017 and Michael Montero (OL) participating in the Tropical Bowl on January 15, 2017.

=== Departures ===
Notable departures from the 2016 squad included:

Name	Number	Pos.	Height	Weight	Year	Hometown	Notes
Dieugot Joseph	#78	OT	6'6"	297	Senior	Orlando, FL	Declared for the 2017 NFL Draft
Jonnu Smith	#87	TE	6'3"	232	Senior	Ocala, FL	Declared for the 2017 NFL Draft

=== 2017 NFL draft ===
Panthers who were picked in the 2017 NFL Draft:

Round	Pick	Player	Position	Team
3	100	Jonnu Smith	TE	Tennessee Titans
UFA		Dieugot Joseph	OT	Chicago Bears

== Schedule ==
FIU announced its 2017 football schedule on January 26, 2017. The 2017 schedule consisted of six home and away games in the regular season.

Date	Time	Opponent	Site	TV	Result	Attendance
August 31	6:00 p.m.	at UCF*	Spectrum Stadium; Orlando, FL	CBSSN	L 17–61	38,063
September 8^{[a]}	7:00 p.m.	vs. Alcorn State*	Legion Field^{[a]}; Birmingham, AL		W 17–10	5,017
September 16	Canceled	at Indiana*	Memorial Stadium; Bloomington, IN			
September 23	7:30 p.m.	at Rice	Rice Stadium; Houston, TX	Stadium	W 13–7	18,932
September 30	7:00 p.m.	Charlotte	Riccardo Silva Stadium; Miami, FL	beIN	W 30–29	15,348
October 7	3:00 p.m.	at Middle Tennessee	Johnny "Red" Floyd Stadium; Murfreesboro, TN	ESPN3	L 17–37	15,527
October 14	7:00 p.m.	Tulane*	Riccardo Silva Stadium; Miami, FL	CUSA.TV	W 23–10	16,433
October 28	2:30 p.m.	at Marshall	Joan C. Edwards Stadium; Huntington, WV	Stadium	W 41–30	19,966
November 4	7:00 p.m.	UTSA^{†}	Riccardo Silva Stadium; Miami, FL	Stadium	W 14–7	18,874
November 11	7:00 p.m.	Old Dominion	Riccardo Silva Stadium; Miami, FL		L 30–37	17,127
November 18	7:00 p.m.	at Florida Atlantic	FAU Stadium; Boca Raton, FL (Shula Bowl)	Stadium	L 24–52	24,116
November 24	7:00 p.m.	Western Kentucky	Riccardo Silva Stadium; Miami, FL	beIN	W 41–17	16,199
December 2	12:00 p.m.	UMass*	Riccardo Silva Stadium; Miami, FL		W 63–45	14,004
December 21	8:00 p.m.	vs. Temple*	Tropicana Field; St. Petersburg, FL (Gasparilla Bowl)	ESPN	L 3–28	16,363
*Non-conference game; ^{†}Homecoming; All times are in Eastern time

^{^[a]}The game between Alcorn State and FIU was relocated to Legion Field at Birmingham, Alabama due to Hurricane Irma.
^{^[b]} A game with UMass was scheduled after the game between UMass and South Florida was postponed due to Hurricane Irma, and FIU's game with Indiana was canceled.
Schedule source:

== Game summaries ==
=== At UCF ===
	1	2	3	4	Total
Panthers	7	3	7	0	17
Knights	14	26	14	7	61

=== Alcorn State ===
	1	2	3	4	Total
Braves	0	7	0	3	10
Panthers	0	7	3	7	17

=== At Rice ===
	1	2	3	4	Total
Panthers	0	10	3	0	13
Owls	0	7	0	0	7

=== Charlotte ===
	1	2	3	4	Total
49ers	12	14	3	0	29
Panthers	7	7	7	9	30

=== At Middle Tennessee ===
	1	2	3	4	Total
Panthers	3	0	7	7	17
Blue Raiders	3	14	10	10	37

=== Tulane ===
	1	2	3	4	Total
Green Wave	0	3	7	0	10
Panthers	7	3	3	10	23

=== At Marshall ===
	1	2	3	4	Total
Panthers	14	14	7	6	41
Thundering Herd	0	7	7	16	30

=== UTSA ===
	1	2	3	4	Total
Roadrunners	0	0	0	7	7
Panthers	0	0	7	7	14

=== Old Dominion ===
	1	2	3	4	Total
Monarchs	7	17	7	6	37
Panthers	7	7	9	7	30

=== At Florida Atlantic ===
	1	2	3	4	Total
Panthers	0	10	7	7	24
Owls	14	7	16	15	52

=== WKU ===
	1	2	3	4	Total
Hilltoppers	3	7	7	0	17
Panthers	3	10	21	7	41

=== UMass ===
	1	2	3	4	Total
Minutemen	14	7	10	14	45
Panthers	14	21	7	21	63

=== Temple–Gasparilla Bowl ===
	1	2	3	4	Total
Owls	0	7	7	14	28
Panthers	0	0	3	0	3
