= 2017 North Texas Mean Green football team =

American college football season

2017 North Texas Mean Green football
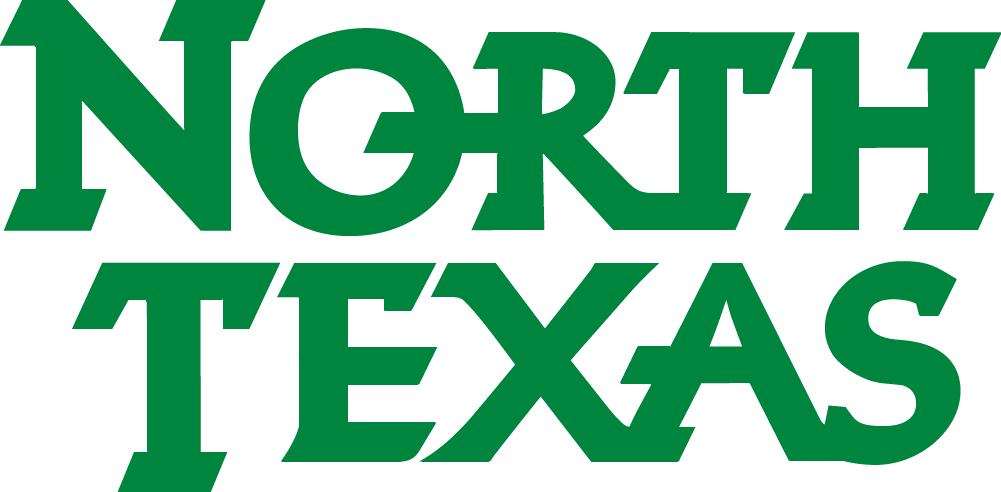

C-USA West Division champion

C-USA Championship Game, L 17–41 vs. Florida Atlantic

New Orleans Bowl, L 30–50 vs. Troy
- Conference: Conference USA
- West Division
- Record: 9–5 (7–1 C-USA)
- Head coach: Seth Littrell (2nd season)
- Offensive coordinator: Graham Harrell (2nd season)
- Offensive scheme: Air raid
- Defensive coordinator: Troy Reffett (2nd season)
- Base defense: 3–3–5
- Home stadium: Apogee Stadium

2017 Conference USA football standings
	Conf.			Overall
Team	W		L	W		L
East Division
Florida Atlantic x$	8	–	0	11	–	3
FIU	5	–	3	8	–	5
Marshall	4	–	4	8	–	5
Middle Tennessee	4	–	4	7	–	6
Western Kentucky	4	–	4	6	–	7
Old Dominion	3	–	5	5	–	7
Charlotte	1	–	7	1	–	11
West Division
North Texas x	7	–	1	9	–	5
Southern Miss	6	–	2	8	–	5
UAB	6	–	2	8	–	5
Louisiana Tech	4	–	4	7	–	6
UTSA	3	–	5	6	–	5
Rice	1	–	7	1	–	11
UTEP	0	–	8	0	–	12
Championship: Florida Atlantic 41, North Texas 17
$ – Conference champion; x – Division champion/co-champions; Rankings from AP Poll

The 2017 North Texas Mean Green football team represented the University of North Texas as a member of Conference USA (C-USA) during the 2017 NCAA Division I FBS football season. Led by second-year head coach Seth Littrell, the Mean Green compiled an overall record of 9–5 with a mark 7–1 in conference play, winning the C-USA's West Division title. North advanced to the C-USA Championship Game, losing to Florida Atlantic. The Mean Green were invited to the New Orleans Bowl, where they lost to Troy. The team played home games at Apogee Stadium in Denton, Texas.

== Schedule ==
North Texas announced its 2017 football schedule on January 26, 2017. The schedule consisted of six home and six away games in the regular season.

Date	Time	Opponent	Site	TV	Result	Attendance
September 2	6:00 p.m.	Lamar*	Apogee Stadium; Denton, TX	ESPN3	W 59–14	19,592
September 9	6:00 p.m.	at SMU*	Gerald J. Ford Stadium; Dallas, TX (Safeway Bowl)	ESPN3	L 32–54	24,638
September 16	2:30 p.m.	at Iowa*	Kinnick Stadium; Iowa City, IA	ESPN2	L 14–31	65,668
September 23	5:30 p.m.	UAB	Apogee Stadium; Denton, TX	beIN	W 46–43	20,142
September 30	6:00 p.m.	at Southern Miss	M. M. Roberts Stadium; Hattiesburg, MS	CUSA.tv	W 43–28	21,907
October 14	5:30 p.m.	UTSA	Apogee Stadium; Denton, TX	ESPN3	W 29–26	23,068
October 21	4:00 p.m.	at Florida Atlantic	FAU Stadium; Boca Raton, FL	ESPN3	L 31–69	13,277
October 28	5:30 p.m.	Old Dominion	Apogee Stadium; Denton, TX	ESPN3	W 45–38	18,872
November 4	2:30 p.m.	at Louisiana Tech	Joe Aillet Stadium; Ruston, LA	Stadium	W 24–23	18,504
November 11	4:00 p.m.	UTEP^{†}	Apogee Stadium; Denton, TX	ESPN3	W 45–10	26,108
November 18	5:30 p.m.	Army*	Apogee Stadium; Denton, TX	beIN	W 52–49	26,392
November 25	12:00 p.m.	at Rice	Rice Stadium; Houston, TX	ESPN3	W 30–14	17,956
December 2	11:00 a.m.	at Florida Atlantic	FAU Stadium; Boca Raton, FL (C–USA Championship Game)	ESPN2	L 17–41	14,258
December 16	12:00 p.m.	vs. Troy*	Mercedes-Benz Superdome; New Orleans, LA (New Orleans Bowl)	ESPN	L 30–50	24,904
*Non-conference game; ^{†}Homecoming; All times are in Central time

== Preseason ==
=== Coaching changes ===
Linebackers coach Mike Ekeler left for North Carolina. Offensive line coach Brad Davis left for Florida.

=== 2017 commitments ===
The Mean Green signed a total of 19 recruits.

== Game summaries ==
=== Lamar ===
Lamar Cardinals at North Texas Mean Green

Quarter	1	2	3	4	Total
Cardinals	7	7	0	0	14
Mean Green	17	21	14	7	59

at Apogee Stadium • Denton, TX

- Date: September 2
- Game time: 6:00 p.m. CDT
- Game attendance: 19,592
- Referee: Justin Elliot
- TV: ESPN3

Game information

First Quarter

- UNT – Jeffrey Wilson 10-yard run (Trevor Moore kick), 12:01. Mean Green 7–0. Drive: 6 plays, 60 yards, 1:55.
- UNT – Quinetin Jackson 31-yard pass from Mason Fine (Trevor Moore kick), 8:38. Mean Green 14–0. Drive: 3 plays, 83 yards, 1:10.
- UNT – Trevor Moore 24-yard field goal, 4:04. Mean Green 17–0. Drive: 9 plays 40 yards, 4:02.
- LAM – Jarod Wood 1-yard pass from Darrell Colbert Jr. (Elvin Martinez kick), 0:34. Mean Green 17–7. Drive: 4 plays, 5 yards, 1:06.

Second Quarter

- UNT – Jeffrey Wilson 2-yard run (Trevor Moore kick), 10:26. Mean Green 24–7. Drive: 12 plays, 44 yards, 5:08.
- UNT – Jeffrey Wilson 62-yard run (Trevor Moore kick), 8:28. Mean Green 31–7. Drive: 2 plays, 68 yards, 0:44.
- LAM – Martell Hawthorne 68-yard pass from Darrell Colbert Jr. (Elvin Martinez kick), 4:59. Mean Green 31–14. Drive: 5 plays, 83 yards, 1:11.
- UNT – Michael Lawrence 44-yard pass from Mason Fine (Trevor Moore kick), 1:56. Mean Green 38–14. Drive: 6 plays, 66 yards, 3:03.

Third Quarter

- UNT – Nic Smith 9-yard pass from Mason Fine (Trevor Moore kick), 12:31. Mean Green 45–14. Drive: 6 plays, 65 yards, 2:29.
- UNT – Nic Smith 1-yard run (Trevor Moore kick), 6:02. Mean Green 52–14. Drive: 10 plays, 83 yards, 4:12.

Fourth Quarter

- UNT – Andrew Tucker 12-yard run (Trevor Moore kick), 14:54. Mean Green 59–14. Drive: 7 plays, 63 yards, 2:54.

Top Passers

- LAM – Darrell Colbert Jr. – 14/28, 140 yards, 2 TD
- UNT – Mason Fine – 15/21, 224 yards, 3 TD

Top Rushers

- LAM – Kendrick King – 11 carries, 37 yards
- UNT – Jeffrey Wilson – 12 carries, 176 yards, 3 TD

Top Receiving

- LAM – Martell Hawthorne – 2 receptions, 79 yards, TD
- UNT – Michael Lawrence – 3 receptions, 70 yards, TD

=== At SMU ===
North Texas Mean Green at SMU Mustangs (37th Safeway Bowl)

Quarter	1	2	3	4	Total
Mean Green	10	0	7	15	32
Mustangs	10	14	16	14	54

at Gerald J. Ford Stadium • Dallas, TX

- Date: September 9
- Game time: 6:00 p.m. CDT
- Game weather: Temperature: 85 °F (29 °C) • Wind: NE 9 MPH • Weather: sunny
- Game attendance: 24,638
- Referee: Steve LaMantia
- TV: ESPN3

Game information

First Quarter

- UNT – Jeffrey Wilson 2-yard run (Trevor Moore kick), 11:41. Mean Green 7–0. Drive: 7 plays, 75 yards, 3:19.
- UNT – Trevor Moore 46-yard field goal, 8:45. Mean Green 10–0. Drive: 5 plays, 14 yards, 2:00.
- SMU – Courtland Sutton 62-yard pass from Ben Hicks (Josh Williams kick), 6:49. Mean Green 10–7. Drive: 5 plays, 75 yards, 1:56.
- SMU – Josh Williams 36-yard field goal, 2:32. Tied 10–10. Drive: 6 plays, 17 yards, 1:44.

Second Quarter

- SMU – Courtland Sutton 40-yard pass from Ben Hicks (Josh Williams kick), 5:15. Mustangs 17–10. Drive: 9 plays, 65 yards, 2:52.
- SMU – Courtland Sutton 4-yard pass from Ben Hicks (Josh Williams kick), 0:10. Mustangs 24–10. Drive: 11 plays, 68 yards, 2:16.

Third Quarter

- SMU – Courtland Sutton 35-yard pass from Ben Hicks (Josh Williams kick), 14:24. Mustangs 31–10. Drive: 1 play, 35 yards, 0:05.
- SMU – Xavier Jones 1-yard run (Josh Williams kick), 11:23. Mustangs 38–10. Drive: 7 plays, 18 yards, 2:53.
- UNT – Jalen Guyton 72-yard pass from Mason Fine (Trevor Moore kick), 6:56. Mustangs 38–17. Drive: 1 play, 72 yards, 0:30.
- SMU – Holding penalty against Jordan Murray enforced in end zone, 4:02. Mustangs 40–17. Drive: 1 play, -12 yards, 0:49.

Fourth Quarter

- SMU – Xavier Jones 47-yard run (Josh Williams kick), 14:30. Mustangs 47–17. Drive: 2 plays, 72 yards, 0:30.
- SMU – Myron Gailliard 76-yard pass from D.J. Gillins (Josh Williams kick), 11:27. Mustangs 54–17. Drive: 1 play, 76 yards, 0:12.
- UNT – Jalen Guyton 29-yard pass from Mason Fine (Trevor Moore kick), 10:45. Mustangs 54–24. Drive: 2 plays, 74 yards, 0:42.
- UNT – Jaelon Darden 13-yard pass from Mason Fine (Mason Fine pass to Jaelon Darden for two-point conversion), 3:24. Mustangs 54–32. Drive: 8 plays, 84 yards, 4:00.

Top Passers

- UNT – Mason Fine – 32/47, 424 yards, 3 TD, 2 INT
- SMU – Ben Hicks – 20/39, 312 yards, 4 TD, INT

Top Rushers

- UNT – Jeffrey Wilson – 13 carries, 31 yards, TD
- SMU – Xavier Jones – 13 carries, 74 yards, TD

Top Receiving

- UNT – Jalen Guyton – 3 receptions, 109 yards, 2 TD
- SMU – Courtland Sutton – 8 receptions, 163 yards, 4 TD

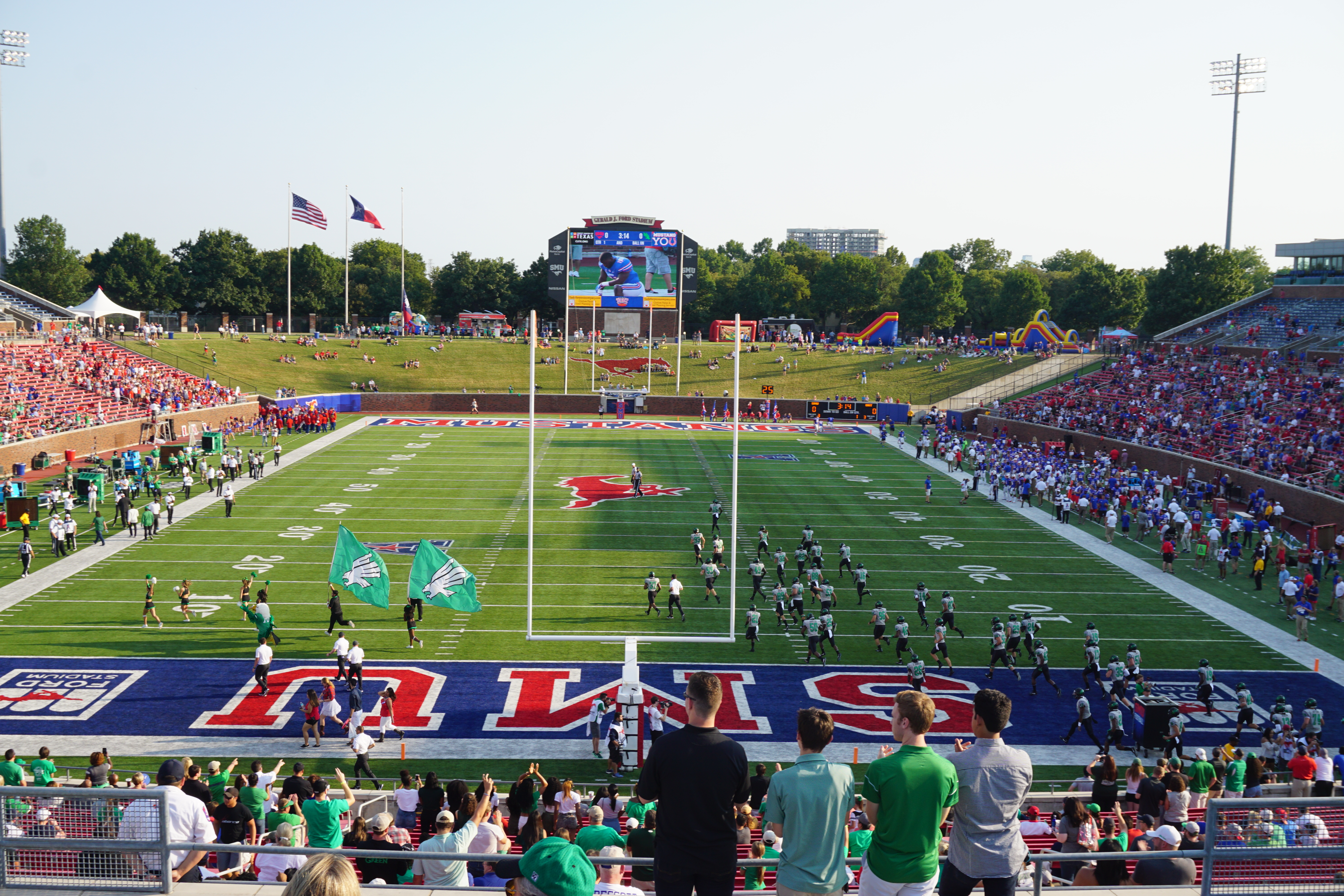
The 2017 North Texas football team taking the field before the game against SMU

=== At Iowa ===
North Texas Mean Green at Iowa Hawkeyes

Quarter	1	2	3	4	Total
Mean Green	7	7	0	0	14
Hawkeyes	7	3	7	14	31

at Kinnick Stadium • Iowa City, IA

- Date: September 16
- Game time: 2:35 p.m. CDT
- Game weather: Temperature: 88 °F (31 °C) • Wind: S 10 MPH • Weather: partly cloudy
- Game attendance: 65,668
- Referee: Jeff Servinski
- TV announcers (ESPN2): Anish Shroff, Ahmad Brooks and Roddy Jones

Game information

First Quarter

- UNT – Jeffrey Wilson 41-yard run (Trevor Moore kick), 5:34. Mean Green 7–0. Drive: 6 plays, 80 yards, 2:44.
- IOWA – T. J. Hockenson 8-yard pass from Nate Stanley (Miguel Recinos kick), 0:52. Tied 7–7. Drive: 10 plays, 75 yards, 4:42.

Second Quarter

- IOWA – Miguel Recinos 42-yard field goal, 5:23. Hawkeyes 10–7. Drive: 8 plays, 39 yards, 2:49.
- UNT – Jalen Guyton 13-yard pass from Quinn Shanbour (Trevor Moore kick), 0:11. Mean Green 14–10. Drive: 5 plays, 66 yards, 0:32.

Third Quarter

- IOWA – Noah Fant 23-yard pass from Nate Stanley (Miguel Recinos kick), 4:24. Hawkeyes 17–14. Drive: 14 plays, 76 yards, 6:52.

Fourth Quarter

- IOWA – Ivory Kelly-Martin 2-yard run (Miguel Recinos kick), 8:16. Hawkeyes 24–14. Drive: 16 plays, 87 yards, 8:50.
- IOWA – Ivory Kelly-Martin 6-yard run (Miguel Recinos kick), 1:47. Hawkeyes 31–14. Drive: 10 plays, 43 yards, 3:59.

Top Passers

- UNT – Mason Fine – 16/26, 167 yards, INT
- IOWA – Nate Stanley – 16/27, 197 yards, 2 TD

Top Rushers

- UNT – Jeffrey Wilson – 12 carries, 95 yards, TD
- IOWA – Toren Young – 19 carries, 78 yards

Top Receiving

- UNT – Turner Smiley – 4 receptions, 74 yards
- IOWA – Akrum Wadley – 2 receptions, 80 yards

=== UAB ===
UAB Blazers at North Texas Mean Green

Quarter	1	2	3	4	Total
Blazers	7	7	15	14	43
Mean Green	10	20	7	9	46

at Apogee Stadium • Denton, TX

- Date: September 23
- Game time: 5:30 p.m. CDT
- Game weather: Temperature: 91 °F (33 °C) • Wind: SE 12 MPH • Weather: partly cloudy
- Game attendance: 20,142
- Referee: Javarro Edwards
- TV: beIN

Game information

First Quarter

- UAB – Spencer Brown 1-yard run (Nick Vogel kick), 9:06. Blazers 7–0. Drive: 12 plays, 66 yards, 5:54.
- UNT – Trevor Moore 29-yard field goal, 3:19. Blazers 7–3. Drive: 14 plays, 63 yards, 5:47.
- UNT – Jalen Guyton 47-yard pass from Mason Fine (Trevor Moore kick), 0:41. Mean Green 10–7. Drive: 2 plays, 58 yards, 0:42.

Second Quarter

- UNT – Jeffrey Wilson 2-yard run (Trevor Moore kick), 11:17. Mean Green 17–7. Drive: 11 plays, 64 yards, 3:37.
- UNT – Nic Smith 29-yard run (Trevor Moore PAT failed), 4:03. Mean Green 23–7. Drive: 8 plays, 56 yards, 3:27.
- UAB – Andre Wilson 48-yard pass from A.J. Erdely (Nick Vogel kick), 2:25. Mean Green 23–14. Drive: 4 plays, 75 yards, 1:38.
- UNT – Michael Lawrence 40-yard pass from Mason Fine (Trevor Moore kick), 0:44. Mean Green 30–14. Drive: 4 plays, 95 yards, 1:39.

Third Quarter

- UAB – Lucious Stanley 6-yard run (Nick Vogel kick), 8:45. Mean Green 30–21. Drive: 9 plays, 45 yards, 3:58.
- UNT – Turner Smiley 22-yard pass from Mason Fine (Trevor Moore kick), 6:56. Mean Green 37–21. Drive: 4 plays, 75 yards, 1:49.
- UAB – Andre Wilson 58-yard pass from A.J. Erdely (A.J. Erdely pass to Logan Scott for two-point conversion), 2:30. Mean Green 37–29. Drive: 6 plays, 87 yards, 1:55.

Fourth Quarter

- UNT – Trevor Moore 40-yard field goal, 14:12. Mean Green 40–29. Drive: 7 plays, 40 yards, 3:18.
- UNT – Trevor Moore 45-yard field goal, 7:43. Mean Green 43–29. Drive: 8 plays, 31 yards, 4:13.
- UAB – Sederian Copeland 4-yard pass from A.J. Erdely (Nick Vogel kick), 5:51. Mean Green 43–36. Drive: 6 plays, 75 yards, 1:52.
- UAB – Lucious Stanley 5-yard pass from A.J. Erdely (Nick Vogel kcik), 0:27. Tied 43–43. Drive: 13 plays, 73 yards, 3:53.
- UNT – Trevor Moore 22-yard field goal, 0:07. Mean Green 46–43. Drive: 2 plays, 32 yards, 0:27.

Top Passers

- UAB – A.J. Erdely – 17/36, 321 yards, 4 TD, INT
- UNT – Mason Fine – 15/29, 261 yards, 3 TD

Top Rushers

- UAB – Spencer Brown – 17 carries, 50 yards, TD
- UNT – Jeffrey Wilson – 26 carries, 211 yards, TD

Top Receiving

- UAB – Andre Wilson – 5 receptions, 150 yards, 2 TD
- UNT – Kelvin Smith – 4 receptions, 82 yards

The win over UAB is the 500th overall victory in program history for the Mean Green.

=== At Southern Miss ===
North Texas Mean Green at Southern Mississippi Golden Eagles

Quarter	1	2	3	4	Total
Mean Green	7	10	16	10	43
Golden Eagles	14	7	7	0	28

at M. M. Roberts Stadium • Hattiesburg, MS

- Date: September 30
- Game time: 6:00 p.m. CDT
- Game weather: Temperature: 85 °F (29 °C) • Wind: NNE 4 MPH • Weather: sunny, 59% humidity
- Game attendance: 21,907
- Referee: Steve LaMantia
- TV: CUSA.TV

Game information

First Quarter

- USM – Allenzae Staggers 7-yard pass from Kwadra Griggs (Parker Shaunfield kick), 11:44. Golden Eagles 7–0. Drive: 9 plays, 75 yards, 3:16.
- USM – Kwadra Griggs 4-yard run (Parker Shaunfield kick), 5:38. Golden Eagles 14–0. Drive: 7 plays, 64 yards, 2:01.
- UNT – Jeffrey Wilson 46-yard run (Trevor Moore kick), 0:47. Golden Eagles 14–7. Drive: 4 plays, 55 yards, 1:17.

Second Quarter

- USM – Ito Smith 65-yard run (Parker Shaunfield kick), 10:00. Golden Eagles 21–7. Drive: 5 plays, 77 yards, 2:09.
- UNT – Jalen Guyton 2-yard pass from Mason Fine (Trevor Moore kick), 2:42. Golden Eagles 21–14. Drive: 12 plays, 95 yards, 5:11.
- UNT – Trevor Moore 48-yard field goal, 0:00. Golden Eagles 21–17. Drive: 8 plays, 49 yards, 0:54.

Third Quarter

- UNT – Trevor Moore 20-yard field goal, 9:01. Golden Eagles 21–20. Drive: 14 plays, 72 yards, 5:59.
- UNT – Rico Bussey Jr. 16-yard pass from Mason Fine (Trevor Moore kick), 4:08. Mean Green 27–21. Drive: 6 plays, 71 yards, 1:56.
- UNT – Jeffrey Wilson 43-yard run (two-point conversion failed), 2:49. Mean Green 33–21. Drive: 3 plays, 51 yards, 0:25.
- USM – Ito Smith 4-yard run (Parker Shaunfield kick), 0:00. Mean Green 33–28. Drive: 9 plays, 75 yards, 2:49.

Fourth Quarter

- UNT – Jeffrey Wilson 6-yard run (Trevor Moore kick), 11:29. Mean Green 40–28. Drive: 8 plays, 75 yards, 3:31.
- UNT – Trevor Moore 44-yard field goal, 4:30. Mean Green 43–28. Drive: 11 plays, 58 yards, 5:38.

Top Passers

- UNT – Mason Fine – 24/40, 366 yards, 2 TD, INT
- USM – Kwadra Griggs – 19/42, 270 yards, TD

Top Rushers

- UNT – Jeffrey Wilson – 30 carries, 148 yards, 3 TD
- USM – Ito Smith – 13 carries, 102 yards, 2 TD

Top Receiving

- UNT – Jalen Guyton – 14 receptions, 211 yards, TD
- USM – Allenzae Staggers – 5 receptions, 112 yards, TD

=== UTSA ===
UTSA Roadrunners at North Texas Mean Green

Quarter	1	2	3	4	Total
Roadrunners	7	10	3	6	26
Mean Green	16	0	0	13	29

at Apogee Stadium • Denton, TX

- Date: October 14
- Game time: 5:30 p.m. CDT
- Game weather: Temperature: 89 °F (32 °C) • Wind: S 16 MPH • Weather: sunny
- Game attendance: 23,068
- Referee: Justin Elliot
- TV: ESPN3

Game information

First Quarter

- UNT – Mason Fine 2-yard run (Trevor Moore kick), 7:35. Mean Green 7–0. Drive: 17 plays, 88 yards, 7:25.
- UNT – Jalen Guyton 77-yard pass from Mason Fine (Trevor Moore PAT failed), 5:32. Mean Green 13–0. Drive: 2 plays, 82 yards, 0:43.
- UTSA – Isaiah Clay 41-yard pass from Dalton Sturm (Jared Sackett kick), 4:38. Mean Green 13–7. Drive: 2 plays, 49 yards, 0:54.
- UNT – Trevor Moore 23-yard field goal, 0:34. Mean Green 16–7. Drive: 10 plays, 69 yards, 4:04.

Second Quarter

- UTSA – Jared Sackett 42-yard field goal, 12:17. Mean Green 16–10. Drive: 8 plays, 50 yards, 3:17.
- UTSA – Liam Beard 0-yard fumble return (Jared Sackett kick), 2:00. Roadrunners 17–16. Drive: 11 plays, 87 yards, 7:02.

Third Quarter

- UTSA – Jared Sackett 37-yard field goal, 8:23. Roadrunners 20–16. Drive: 7 plays, 28 yards, 3:13.

Fourth Quarter

- UNT – Jalen Guyton 32-yard pass from Mason Fine (Trevor Moore PAT failed), 12:47. Mean Green 22–20. Drive: 10 plays, 80 yards, 4:25.
- UTSA – Jalen Rhodes 46-yard pass from Dalton Sturm (two-point conversion failed), 3:29. Roadrunners 26–22. Drive: 9 plays, 87 yards, 5:07.
- UNT – Rico Bussey Jr. 22-yard pass from Mason Fine (Trevor Moore kick), 0:10. Mean Green 29–26. Drive: 7 plays, 98 yards, 0:57.

Top Passers

- UTSA – Dalton Sturm – 13/24, 215 yards, 2 TD
- UNT – Mason Fine – 20/34, 354 yards, 3 TD, INT

Top Rushers

- UTSA – Jalen Rhodes – 19 carries, 71 yards
- UNT – Jeffrey Wilson – 16 carries, 83 yards

Top Receiving

- UTSA – Josh Stewart – 3 receptions, 54 yards
- UNT – Jalen Guyton – 8 receptions, 182 yards, 2 TD

=== At Florida Atlantic ===
North Texas Mean Green at Florida Atlantic Owls

Quarter	1	2	3	4	Total
Mean Green	0	7	10	14	31
Owls	24	17	21	7	69

at FAU Stadium • Boca Raton, Florida

- Date: October 21
- Game time: 4:00 p.m. CDT
- Game weather: Temperature: 86 °F (30 °C) • Wind: ESE 10 MPH • Weather: partly cloudy, 76% humidity
- Game attendance: 13,277
- Referee: Jon Noli
- TV: ESPN3

Game information

First Quarter

- FAU – Devin Singletary 2-yard run (Greg Joseph kick), 11:53. Owls 7–0. Drive: 10 plays, 75 yards, 3:07.
- FAU – Devin Singletary 3-yard run (Greg Joseph kick), 6:41. Owls 14–0. Drive: 9 plays, 50 yards, 2:53.
- FAU – Greg Joseph 44-yard field goal, 3:45. Owls 17–0. Drive: 8 plays, 45 yards, 2:01.
- FAU – Willie Wright 69-yard pass from Jason Driskel (Greg Joseph kick), 1:16. Owls 24–0. Drive: 2 plays, 83 yards, 0:37.

Second Quarter

- UNT – O'Keeron Rutherford 9-yard pass from Mason Fine (Trevor Moore kick), 11:45. Owls 24–7. Drive: 13 plays, 75 yards, 4:31.
- FAU – Jason Driskel 1-yard run (Greg Joseph kick), 7:23. Owls 31–7. Drive: 12 plays, 85 yards, 4:22.
- FAU – Devin Singletary 22-yard run (Greg Joseph kick), 3:55. Owls 38–7. Drive: 4 plays, 38 yards, 1:30.
- FAU – Greg Joseph 24-yard field goal, 0:00. Owls 41–7. Drive: 13 plays, 77 yards, 1:57.

Third Quarter

- UNT – Trevor Moore 44-yard field goal, 10:37. Owls 41–10. Drive: 12 plays, 48 yards, 4:23.
- FAU – Harrison Bryant 5-yard pass from Jason Driskel (Greg Joseph kick), 8:32. Owls 48–10. Drive: 6 plays, 71 yards, 2:05.
- UNT – Jeffrey Wilson 6-yard run (Trevor Moore kick), 6:17. Owls 48–17. Drive: 7 plays, 75 yards, 2:15.
- FAU – Gregory Howell Jr. 2-yard run (Greg Joseph kick), 3:00. Owls 55–17. Drive: 8 plays, 85 yards, 3:17.
- FAU – Kerrith Whyte Jr. 82-yard run (Greg Joseph kick), 0:00. Owls 62–17. Drive: 3 plays, 82 yards, 1:35.

Fourth Quarter

- FAU – John Franklin III 55-yard run (Greg Joseph kick), 12:41. Owls 69–17. Drive: 2 plays, 66 yards, 0:58.
- UNT – Evan Johnson 8-yard run (Trevor Moore kick), 8:25. Owls 69–24. Drive: 13 plays, 75 yards, 4:16.
- UNT – Nic Smith 1-yard pass from Mason Fine (Trevor Moore kick), 0:30. Owls 69–31. Drive: 9 plays, 53 yards, 3:22.

Top Passers

- UNT – Mason Fine – 31/47, 283 yards, 2 TD, 2 INT
- FAU – Jason Driskel – 24/35, 357 yards, 2 TD

Top Rushers

- UNT – Jeffrey Wilson – 11 carries, 49 yards, TD
- FAU – Devin Singletary – 17 carries, 123 yards, 3 TD

Top Receiving

- UNT – Michael Lawrence – 11 receptions, 112 yards
- FAU – Willie Wright – 8 receptions, 141 yards, TD

=== Old Dominion ===
Old Dominion Monarchs at North Texas Mean Green

Quarter	1	2	3	4	Total
Monarchs	10	13	15	0	38
Mean Green	14	21	0	10	45

at Apogee Stadium • Denton, TX

- Date: October 28
- Game time: 5:30 p.m. CDT
- Game weather: Temperature: 59 °F (15 °C) • Wind: SSW 10 MPH • Weather: sunny
- Game attendance: 18,872
- Referee: Steve LaMantia
- TV: ESPN3

Game information

First Quarter

- UNT – Jeffrey Wilson 1-yard run (Trevor Moore kick), 10:05. Mean Green 7–0. Drive: 13 plays, 77 yards, 4:55.
- ODU – Isaiah Harper 98-yard kickoff return (Nick Rice kick), 9:52. Tied 7–7.
- UNT – Rico Bussey Jr. 34-yard pass from Mason Fine (Trevor Moore kick), 8:49. Mean Green 14–7. Drive: 4 plays, 68 yards, 1:03.
- ODU – Nick Rice 45-yard field goal, 2:28. Mean Green 14–10. Drive: 6 plays, 31 yards, 2:22.

Second Quarter

- UNT – Evan Johnson 6-yard run (Trevor Moore kick), 14:32. Mean Green 21–10. Drive: 9 plays, 75 yards, 2:56.
- UNT – Evan Johnson 40-yard blocked punt return (Trevor Moore kick), 11:57. Mean Green 28–10. Drive: 5 plays, 24 yards, 2:35.
- ODU – Isaiah Harper 98-yard kickoff return (Nick Rice kick), 11:41. Mean Green 28–17.
- ODU – Nick Rice 28-yard field goal, 10:31. Mean Green 28–20. Drive: 4 plays, 5 yards, 0:52.
- UNT – Nic Smith 1-yard run (Trevor Moore kick), 5:39. Mean Green 35–20. Drive: 7 plays, 30 yards, 2:05.
- ODU – Nick Rice 34-yard field goal, 0:00. Mean Green 35–23. Drive: 17 plays, 60 yards, 2:50.

Third Quarter

- ODU – Jeremy Cox 1-yard run (Nick Smith kick), 11:27. Mean Green 35–30. Drive: 9 plays, 66 yards, 3:33.
- ODU – Steven Williams 10-yard run (Steven Williams pass to Melvin Vaughn for two-point conversion), 1:37. Monarchs 38–35. Drive: 11 plays, 65 yards, 3:53.

Fourth Quarter

- UNT – Trevor Moore 23-yard field goal, 10:45. Tied 38–38. Drive: 6 plays, 17 yards, 1:42.
- UNT – Nic Smith 20-yard run (Trevor Moore kick), 7:27. Mean Green 45–38. Drive: 4 plays, 48 yards, 0:54.

Top Passers

- ODU – Steven Williams – 21/35, 181 yards, 2 INT
- UNT – Mason Fine – 25/36, 309 yards, TD, INT

Top Rushers

- ODU – Jeremy Cox – 24 carries, 109 yards, TD
- UNT – Nic Smith – 18 carries, 71 yards, 2 TD

Top Receiving

- ODU – Melvin Vaughn – 6 receptions, 69 yards
- UNT – Rico Bussey Jr. – 7 receptions, 111 yards, TD

=== At Louisiana Tech ===
North Texas Mean Green at Louisiana Tech Bulldogs

Quarter	1	2	3	4	Total
Mean Green	7	3	7	7	24
Bulldogs	3	14	3	3	23

at Joe Aillet Stadium • Ruston, LA

- Date: November 4
- Game time: 2:30 p.m. CDT
- Game weather: Temperature: 81 °F (27 °C) • Wind: S 10 MPH • Weather: partly cloudy
- Game attendance: 18,504
- Referee: Rodney Burnette
- TV: STADIUM

Game information

First Quarter

- UNT – Jeffrey Wilson 8-yard run (Trevor Moore kick), 4:12. Mean Green 7–0. Drive: 11 plays, 63 yards, 4:32.
- LT – Jonathan Barnes 47-yard field goal, 0:46. Mean Green 7–3. Drive: 11 plays, 37 yards, 3:26.

Second Quarter

- LT – Boston Scott 4-yard run (Jonathan Barnes kick), 12:17. Bulldogs 10–7. Drive: 7 plays, 52 yards, 2:43.
- LT – J'Mar Smith 7 yard run (Jonathan Barnes kick), 0:39. Bulldogs 17–7. Drive: 9 plays, 80 yards, 2:20.
- UNT – Trevor Moore 48-yard field goal, 0:00. Bulldogs 17–10. Drive: 6 plays, 44 yards, 0:39.

Third Quarter

- UNT – Rico Bussey Jr. 22-yard pass from Mason Fine (Trevor Moore kick), 11:16. Tied 17–17. Drive: 6 plays, 53 yards, 2:01.
- LT – Jonathan Barnes 37-yard field goal, 6:50. Bulldogs 20–17. Drive: 10 plays, 55 yards, 4:26.

Fourth Quarter

- LT – Jonathan Barnes 35-yard field goal, 13:35. Bulldogs 23–17. Drive: 12 plays, 62 yards, 5:08.
- UNT – Jeffrey Wilson 14-yard run (Trevor Moore kick), 6:04. Mean Green 24–23. Drive: 9 plays, 78 yards, 3:23.

Top Passers

- UNT – Mason Fine – 23/37, 211 yards, TD, INT
- LT – J'Mar Smith – 16/28, 168 yards

Top Rushers

- UNT – Jeffrey Wilson – 20 carries, 165 yards, 2 TD
- LT – Boston Scott – 16 carries, 64 yards, TD

Top Receiving

- UNT – Michael Lawrence – 4 receptions, 47 yards
- LT – Rhashid Bonnette – 6 receptions, 77 yards

=== UTEP ===
UTEP Miners at North Texas Mean Green (Homecoming 2017)

Quarter	1	2	3	4	Total
Miners	7	0	3	0	10
Mean Green	7	7	14	17	45

at Apogee Stadium • Denton, TX

- Date: November 11
- Game time: 4:00 p.m. CST
- Game attendance: 26,108
- Referee: Justin Elliot
- TV: ESPN3

Game information

First Quarter

- UTEP – Kahani Smith 45-yard fumble return (Jason Filley kick), 12:08. Miners 7–0. Drive: 4 plays, 16 yards, 1:08.
- UNT – Jaelon Darden 13-yard pass from Mason Fine (Trevor Moore kick), 0:48. Tied 7–7. Drive: 10 plays, 64 yards, 3:55.

Second Quarter

- UNT – Jaelon Darden 2-yard pass from Mason Fine (Trevor Moore kick), 2:18. Mean Green 14–7. Drive: 12 plays, 81 yards, 4:05.

Third Quarter

- UNT – Jeffrey Wilson 1-yard run (Trevor Moore kick), 11:08. Mean Green 21–7. Drive: 8 plays, 75 yards, 3:52.
- UTEP – Jason Filley 27-yard field goal, 6:26. Mean Green 21–10. Drive: 10 plays, 66 yards, 4:42.
- UNT – Rico Bussey Jr. 60-yard pass from Mason Fine (Trevor Moore kick), 5:19. Mean Green 28–10. Drive: 4 plays, 71 yards, 1:07.

Fourth Quarter

- UNT – Jalen Guyton 2-yard pass from Mason Fine (Trevor Moore kick), 14:56. Mean Green 35–10. Drive: 4 plays, 80 yards, 0:35.
- UNT – Trevor Moore 31-yard field goal, 9:06. Mean Green 38–10. Drive: 6 plays, 16 yards, 2:03.
- UNT – Andrew Tucker 10-yard run (Trevor Moore kick), 5:59. Mean Green 45–10. Drive: 3 plays, 26 yards, 1:20.

Top Passers

- UTEP – Zack Greenlee – 13/25, 109 yards, INT
- UNT – Mason Fine – 23/35, 213 yards, 4 TD

Top Rushers

- UTEP – Joshua Fields – 16 carries, 45 yards
- UNT – Jeffrey Wilson – 20 carries, 140 yards, TD

Top Receiving

- UTEP – Terry Juniel – 4 receptions, 38 yards
- UNT – Rico Bussey Jr. – 3 receptions, 65 yards, TD

With the victory, the Mean Green won the C-USA West division and will play in the conference championship game.

=== Army ===
Army Black Knights at North Texas Mean Green

Quarter	1	2	3	4	Total
Black Knights	7	13	8	21	49
Mean Green	14	14	7	17	52

at Apogee Stadium • Denton, TX

- Date: November 18
- Game time: 5:30 p.m. CST
- Game weather: Temperature: 57 °F (14 °C) • Wind: N 18 MPH • Weather: partly cloudy
- Game attendance: 26,392
- Referee: Rodney Burnette
- TV: beIN

Game information

First Quarter

- UNT – Jeffrey Wilson 5-yard run (Trevor Moore kick), 10:55. Mean Green 7–0. Drive: 10 plays, 77 yards, 4:05.
- ARMY – Ahmad Bradshaw 1-yard run (Blake Wilson kick), 4:52. Tied 7–7. Drive: 11 plays, 70 yards, 6:03.
- UNT – Turner Smiley 45-yard pass from Mason Fine (Trevor Moore kick), 3:31. Mean Green 14–7. Drive: 3 plays, 76 yards, 1:21.

Second Quarter

- UNT – Jeffrey Wilson 7-yard run (Trevor Moore kick), 14:45. Mean Green 21–7. Drive: 2 plays, 7 yards, 0:08.
- ARMY – Ahmad Bradshaw 15-yard run (Blake Wilson PAT missed), 8:58. Mean Green 21–13. Drive: 12 plays, 75 yards, 5:47.
- UNT – Jalen Guyton 10-yard pass from Mason Fine (Trevor Moore kick), 7:11. Mean Green 28–13. Drive: 5 plays, 32 yards, 1:47.
- ARMY – Darnell Woolfolk 7-yard run (Blake Wilson kick), 4:33. Mean Green 28–20. Drive: 6 plays, 75 yards, 2:38.

Third Quarter

- ARMY – Fred Cooper Jr. 17-yard run (Ahmad Bradshaw run for two-point conversion), 12:21. Tied 28–28. Drive: 5 plays, 74 yards, 2:39.
- UNT – Michael Lawrence 8-yard pass from Mason Fine (Trevor Moore kick), 7:04. Mean Green 35–28. Drive: 10 plays, 88 yards, 5:17.

Fourth Quarter

- ARMY – Darnell Woolfolk 2-yard run (Blake Wilson kick), 14:42. Tied 35–35. Drive: 8 plays, 58 yards, 3:58.
- UNT – Nic Smith 3-yard run (Trevor Moore kick), 10:04. Mean Green 42–35. Drive: 11 plays, 81 yards, 4:38.
- ARMY – Andy Davidson 4-yard run (Blake Wilson kick), 4:05. Tied 42–42. Drive: 11 plays, 75 yards, 5:59.
- UNT – Turner Smiley 68-yard pass from Mason Fine (Trevor Moore kick), 3:13. Mean Green 49–42. Drive: 3 plays, 71 yards, 0:52.
- ARMY – Andy Davidson 1-yard run (Blake Wilson kick), 1:23. Tied 49–49. Drive: 6 plays, 75 yards, 1:50.
- UNT – Trevor Moore 39-yard field goal, 0:05. Mean Green 52–49. Drive: 9 plays, 46 yards, 1:18.

Top Passers

- ARMY – Ahmad Bradshaw – 1/3, 27 yards
- UNT – Mason Fine – 24/36, 386 yards, 4 TD, INT

Top Rushers

- ARMY – Ahmad Bradshaw – 27 carries, 244 yards, 2 TD
- UNT – Jeffrey Wilson – 19 carries, 72 yards, 2 TD

Top Receiving

- ARMY – John Trainor – 1 reception, 27 yards
- UNT – Turner Smiley – 3 receptions, 123 yards, 2 TD

The Mean Green outlasted the Black Knights with a 52–49 victory, with Trevor Moore kicking a game winning 39-yard field goal for North Texas. With the win, the Mean Green finished the 2017 season with a home record of 6–0, their first undefeated record at home since the 2003 season. Army only completed one pass during the entire game, with Ahmad Bradshaw throwing a 27-yard pass to John Trainor in the 3rd quarter.

=== At Rice ===
North Texas Mean Green at Rice Owls

Quarter	1	2	3	4	Total
Mean Green	7	17	3	3	30
Owls	7	7	0	0	14

at Rice Stadium • Houston, TX

- Date: November 25
- Game time: 12:00 p.m. CST
- Game weather: Temperature: 77 °F (25 °C) • Wind: S 6 MPH • Weather: humidity 56%
- Game attendance: 17,956
- Referee: Jonathan Noli
- TV: ESPN3

Game information

First Quarter

- RICE – Brandon Douglas-Dotson 75-yard interception return (Will Harrison kick), 8:39. Owls 7–0.
- UNT – Nic Smith 13-yard run (Trevor Moore kick), 5:17. Tied 7–7. Drive: 9 plays, 75 yards, 3:22.

Second Quarter

- UNT – Rico Bussey Jr. 51-yard pass from Mason Fine (Trevor Moore kick), 11:58. Mean Green 14–7. Drive: 9 plays, 88 yards, 3:02.
- UNT – Jaelon Darden 81-yard punt return (Trevor Moore kick), 9:35. Mean Green 21–7.
- RICE – Miklo Smalls 52-yard run (Will Harrison kick), 7:17. Mean Green 21–14. Drive: 5 plays, 75 yards, 2:18.
- UNT – Trevor Moore 44-yard field goal, 0:55. Mean Green 24–14. Drive: 11 plays, 48 yards, 6:22.

Third Quarter

- UNT – Trevor Moore 19-yard field goal, 3:30. Mean Green 27–14. Drive: 11 plays, 55 yards, 4:57.

Fourth Quarter

- UNT – Trevor Moore 43-yard field goal, 2:56. Mean Green 30–14. Drive: 9 plays, 54 yards, 3:09.

Top Passers

- UNT – Mason Fine – 18/25, 195 yards, TD, INT
- RICE – Miklo Smalls – 6/16, 107 yards, INT

Top Rushers

- UNT – Nic Smith – 26 carries, 178 yards, TD
- RICE – Miklo Smalls – 17 carries, 89 yards, TD

Top Receiving

- UNT – Rico Bussey Jr. – 3 receptions, 71 yards, TD
- RICE – Aaron Cephus – 2 receptions, 50 yards

=== At Florida Atlantic—C-USA Championship Game ===
North Texas Mean Green at Florida Atlantic Owls (2017 C-USA Championship Game)

Quarter	1	2	3	4	Total
Mean Green	0	0	9	8	17
Owls	10	17	7	7	41

at FAU Stadium • Boca Raton, Florida

- Date: December 2
- Game time: 11:00 p.m. CST
- Game attendance: 14,258
- TV: ESPN2

Game information

First Quarter

- FAU – Greg Joseph 24-yard field goal, 12:19. Owls 3–0. Drive: 9 plays, 65 yards, 2:41.
- FAU – John Franklin III 22-yard pass from Kamrin Solomon (Greg Joseph kick), 10:11. Owls 10–0. Drive: 2 plays, 71 yards, 0:32.

Second Quarter

- FAU – Devin Singletary 3-yard run (Greg Joseph kick), 14:55. Owls 17–0. Drive: 6 plays, 64 yards, 1:55.
- FAU – Greg Joseph 21-yard field goal, 9:56. Owls 20–0. Drive: 11 plays, 80 yards, 3:36.
- FAU – Devin Singletary 5-yard run (Greg Joseph kick), 4:43. Owls 27–0. Drive: 9 plays, 50 yards, 2:54.

Third Quarter

- FAU – Kalib Woods 54-yard pass from Jason Driskel (Greg Joseph kick), 12:21. Owls 34–0. Drive: 3 plays, 74 yards, 1:10.
- UNT – Trevor Moore 26-yard field goal, 5:50. Owls 34–3. Drive: 16 plays, 73 yards, 6:31.
- UNT – Turner Smiley 77-yard pass from Mason Fine (two-point conversion failed), 4:47. Owls 34–9. Drive: 1 play, 77 yards, 0:13.

Fourth Quarter

- UNT – Evan Johnson 1-yard run (Mason Fine pass to Rico Bussey Jr.), 10:32. Owls 34–17. Drive: 7 plays, 62 yards, 2:27.
- FAU – Devin Singletary 5-yard run (Greg Joseph kick), 5:27. Owls 41–17. Drive: 10 plays, 71 yards, 5:05.

Top Passers

- UNT – Mason Fine – 28/44, 356 yards, TD, 2 INT
- FAU – Jason Driskel – 15/27, 269 yards, TD

Top Rushers

- UNT – Nic Smith – 14 carries, 50 yards
- FAU – Devin Singletary – 26 carries, 164 yards, 3 TD

Top Receiving

- UNT – Rico Bussey Jr. – 8 receptions, 109 yards
- FAU – Kalib Woods – 6 receptions, 208 yards, TD

=== Troy—New Orleans Bowl ===
Troy Trojans vs North Texas Mean Green (2017 New Orleans Bowl)

Quarter	1	2	3	4	Total
Trojans	15	7	21	7	50
Mean Green	7	13	3	7	30

at Mercedes-Benz Superdome • New Orleans, LA

- Date: December 16
- Game time: 12:00 p.m. CST
- Game weather: Played indoors (domed stadium)
- Game attendance: 24,904
- Referee: David Alvarez
- TV announcers (ESPN): Jason Benetti, Kelly Stouffer and Kris Budden

Game information

First quarter

Second quarter

Third quarter

Fourth quarter

Top passers

- TROY – Brandon Silvers – 24/31, 305 yards, 4 TD, INT
- UNT – Mason Fine – 30/54, 303 yards, 3 TD, 2 INT

Top rushers

- TROY – Josh Anderson – 22 carries, 113 yards, 2 TD
- UNT – Evan Johnson – 6 carries, 26 yards

Top receivers

- TROY – Damion Willis – 11 receptions, 135 yards, 2 TD
- UNT – Michael Lawrence – 6 receptions, 70 yards, TD

== Awards ==
- C-USA Football Coaches Preseason Award: Defense Nate Brooks Jr. and Kishawn McClain Sr.
