= 2017 Louisiana Tech Bulldogs football team =

American college football season

2017 Louisiana Tech Bulldogs football

Frisco Bowl champion

Frisco Bowl, W 51–10 vs. SMU
- Conference: Conference USA
- West Division
- Record: 7–6 (4–4 C-USA)
- Head coach: Skip Holtz (5th season)
- Offensive coordinator: Todd Fitch (2nd season)
- Offensive scheme: Multiple
- Defensive coordinator: Blake Baker (3rd season)
- Base defense: 4–3
- Home stadium: Joe Aillet Stadium

2017 Conference USA football standings
	Conf.			Overall
Team	W		L	W		L
East Division
Florida Atlantic x$	8	–	0	11	–	3
FIU	5	–	3	8	–	5
Marshall	4	–	4	8	–	5
Middle Tennessee	4	–	4	7	–	6
Western Kentucky	4	–	4	6	–	7
Old Dominion	3	–	5	5	–	7
Charlotte	1	–	7	1	–	11
West Division
North Texas x	7	–	1	9	–	5
Southern Miss	6	–	2	8	–	5
UAB	6	–	2	8	–	5
Louisiana Tech	4	–	4	7	–	6
UTSA	3	–	5	6	–	5
Rice	1	–	7	1	–	11
UTEP	0	–	8	0	–	12
Championship: Florida Atlantic 41, North Texas 17
$ – Conference champion; x – Division champion/co-champions; Rankings from AP Poll

The 2017 Louisiana Tech Bulldogs football team represented Louisiana Tech University in the 2017 NCAA Division I FBS football season. The Bulldogs played their home games at the Joe Aillet Stadium in Ruston, Louisiana and competed in the West Division of Conference USA (C–USA). They were led by fifth-year head coach Skip Holtz. They finished the season 7–6, 4–4 in C-USA play to finish in fourth place in the West Division. They were invited to the Frisco Bowl where they defeated SMU.

== Schedule ==
Louisiana Tech announced its 2017 football schedule on January 26, 2017. The 2017 schedule consists of 7 home and 5 away games in the regular season. The Bulldogs will host C-USA foes Florida Atlantic, North Texas, Southern Miss, and UTSA, and will travel to Rice, UAB, UTEP, and Western Kentucky (WKU).

The Bulldogs will host three of the four non-conference opponents, Mississippi State from the Southeastern Conference, Northwestern State from the Southland Conference, and South Alabama from the Sun Belt Conference. They will travel to South Carolina, also from the Southeastern Conference.

Date	Time	Opponent	Site	TV	Result	Attendance
September 2	6:00 p.m.	Northwestern State*	Joe Aillet Stadium; Ruston, LA (rivalry)	ESPN3	W 52–24	24,002
September 9	6:30 p.m.	Mississippi State*	Joe Aillet Stadium; Ruston, LA	CBSSN	L 21–57	28,100
September 16	6:00 p.m.	at Western Kentucky	Houchens Industries–L. T. Smith Stadium; Bowling Green, KY	Stadium	W 23–22	16,223
September 23	2:30 p.m.	at South Carolina*	Williams-Brice Stadium; Columbia, SC	SECN	L 16–17	71,821
September 30	6:00 p.m.	South Alabama*	Joe Aillet Stadium; Ruston, LA	ESPN3	W 34–16	22,013
October 7	3:00 p.m.	at UAB	Legion Field; Birmingham, AL	CUSA.TV	L 22–23	27,213
October 21	6:00 p.m.	Southern Miss	Joe Aillet Stadium; Ruston, LA (Rivalry in Dixie)	STADIUM	L 27–34 ^{2OT}	17,815
October 28	2:30 p.m.	at Rice	Rice Stadium; Houston, TX	FloSports	W 42–28	19,992
November 4	2:30 p.m.	North Texas^{†}	Joe Aillet Stadium; Ruston, LA	STADIUM	L 23–24	18,504
November 11	2:30 p.m.	Florida Atlantic	Joe Aillet Stadium; Ruston, LA	STADIUM	L 23–48	16,511
November 18	2:00 p.m.	at UTEP	Sun Bowl; El Paso, TX	CUSA.TV	W 42–21	16,597
November 25	6:30 p.m.	UTSA	Joe Aillet Stadium; Ruston, LA	ESPNU	W 20–6	15,651
December 20	7:00 p.m.	vs. SMU*	Toyota Stadium; Frisco, TX (Frisco Bowl)	ESPN	W 51–10	14,419
*Non-conference game; ^{†}Homecoming; All times are in Central time

== Game summaries ==
=== Northwestern State ===
	1	2	3	4	Total
Demons	7	3	14	0	24
Bulldogs	10	14	7	21	52

=== Mississippi State ===
	1	2	3	4	Total
MSU Bulldogs	16	20	21	0	57
La. Tech Bulldogs	9	5	0	7	21

The Bulldogs jumped to an early 9-0 lead after an Amik Robertson interception return set up a two yard touchdown run by Kam McKnight. However, it was all MSU after that, as the Bulldogs scored 36 unanswered points to go up 36-14 at halftime en route to the resounding win.

One notable sequence in this game occurred early in the 4th quarter. Louisiana Tech had driven the ball all the way to the MSU six yard line, but on 2nd and goal, a bad snap and several failed attempts to recover the football saw the Bulldogs eventually face 3rd and goal from their own seven yard line. Boston Scott ran for 21 yards on that third down play and, on fourth down, the Bulldogs concluded their strange drive with a punt.

=== At WKU ===
	1	2	3	4	Total
Bulldogs	3	10	0	10	23
Hilltoppers	8	7	7	0	22

=== At South Carolina ===
	1	2	3	4	Total
Bulldogs	3	3	7	3	16
Gamecocks	0	0	0	17	17

=== South Alabama ===
	1	2	3	4	Total
Jaguars	7	6	3	0	16
Bulldogs	14	3	0	17	34

=== At UAB ===
	1	2	3	4	Total
Bulldogs	7	3	0	12	22
Blazers	13	3	0	7	23

=== Southern Miss ===
	1	2	3	4	OT	2OT	Total
Golden Eagles	3	7	6	11	0	7	34
Bulldogs	3	14	0	10	0	0	27

=== At Rice ===
	1	2	3	4	Total
Bulldogs	7	14	7	14	42
Owls	0	7	7	14	28

=== North Texas ===
	1	2	3	4	Total
Mean Green	7	3	7	7	24
Bulldogs	3	14	3	3	23

=== Florida Atlantic ===
	1	2	3	4	Total
Owls	6	14	22	6	48
Bulldogs	3	6	7	7	23

=== At UTEP ===
	1	2	3	4	Total
Bulldogs	7	21	0	14	42
Miners	0	0	14	7	21

=== UTSA ===
	1	2	3	4	Total
Roadrunners	0	0	3	3	6
Bulldogs	7	3	3	7	20

=== vs SMU–Frisco Bowl ===
	1	2	3	4	Total
Bulldogs	21	21	6	3	51
Mustangs	3	7	0	0	10

== Roster ==
2017 Louisiana Tech Bulldogs football team roster
Players
Coaches
Offense

Pos.	#	Name	Class
QB	2	Elijah Walker	Fr
RB	3	Jarred Craft	Sr
WR	4	Alfred Smith	So
RB	6	Boston Scott	Sr
QB	8	J'Mar Smith	So
WR	9	Teddy Veal	Jr
QB	10	Westin Elliott	So
QB/WR	11	Jon Randall Belton	Fr
WR	13	Marlon Watts	Sr
QB	14	Justin Stolberg	Fr
WR	15	Kam McKnight	Jr
WR	16	Marcus Gaines	Sr
WR	17	DeJuawn Oliver	Sr
QB	18	Nate Cox	Fr
TE	19	Alex Woodall	Jr
RB	22	Israel Tucker	Fr
RB	23	Jaqwis Dancy	So
WR	27	Cualan Andrews	Fr
RB	29	Dee Fleming	So
TE	29	Hunter Stelly	Fr
WR	31	Gavin Englade	So
RB	32	Jackson Smithey	Fr
WR	35	Wes Gresham	So
RB	41	Bobby Holly	So
WR	42	Roderick Jackson	So
RB	43	Quanta Moore	Jr
OL	54	Hanner Shipley	Jr
OL	55	Drew Kirkpatrick	Jr
OL	57	DeVante Lovett	So
OL	58	Joshua Outlaw	Sr
OL	61	Ethan Reed	So
OL	62	Abraham Delfin	Fr
OL	64	Joshua Mote	Fr
OL	65	Kody Russey	Fr
OL	66	Shane Carpenter	Jr
OL	68	Justin Throckmorton	Fr
OL	69	Drew Melancon	Fr
OL	72	Chris Roberts	So
OL	74	O'Shea Dugas	Jr
OL	75	Michael Rodriguez	Jr
OL	76	Conner Estes	Fr
OL	77	Gewhite Stallworth	Jr
OL	79	Kennedy Madison	Fr
WR	80	Griffin Hebert	Fr
WR	81	Cee Jay Powell	Fr
WR	83	Jake Norris	Fr
WR	84	Javonte Woodard	So
WR	85	Deontae Allen	Fr
WR	86	Rhashid Bonnette	So
WR	87	George Scott	Fr
TE	88	Zach Cousar	Fr
WR	89	Adrian Hardy	Fr

Defense

Pos.	#	Name	Class
S	2	Secdrick Cooper	Sr
CB	5	Michael Sam	Jr
S	7	Jaiden Cole	Fr
S	8	DaMarion King	Sr
S	14	Ronald Lewis	Sr
CB	18	Zach Hannibal	Fr
S	20	Kollin Hurt	Fr
CB	21	Amik Robertson	Fr
CB	24	L'Jarius Sneed	So
S	25	Theron Williams	Jr
S	26	Jacorion Andrews	Fr
S	28	Jordan Baldwin	Jr
CB	30	Aaron Roberson	Jr
LB	31	Russell Farris	Sr
CB	32	Trey Spencer	Jr
LB	33	Dae'Von Washington	Jr
LB	34	Reggie Cleveland	Fr
LB	35	Collin Scott	So
CB	37	Ephraim Kitchen	So
S	38	Darryl Lewis	So
LB	39	Randy Hogan	Jr
CB	40	Roland Dunn	Sr
S	42	James Jackson	So
LB	44	Brandon Durman	Jr
DE	45	Jaylon Ferguson	Jr
DB	46	Ezekiel Barnett	Fr
DE	47	Eric Kendzior	So
LB	48	Alex Zayed	Fr
S	49	Elliot Blankenship	Sr
DE	50	Deldrick Canty	Sr
LB	51	Gaston Richardson	Fr
DE	58	Charles Adeola	So
DE	64	Parker Brewton	Fr
DL	67	Tyler Spears	Jr
DL	73	Luke Robinson	Fr
DE	85	Willie Baker	Fr
DT	90	Courtney Wallace	So
DT	91	Cedric Johnson	Jr
DT	92	La'Dante Davenport	So
DE	93	Immanuel Turner	Jr
DT	94	Jordan Bradford	Jr
DE	95	Matthew Ydarraga	Jr
DL	96	Ka'Derrion Mason	So
DL	97	Milton Williams	Fr
LB	98	Tristan Allen	Fr
DT	99	Keonatye Garner	Jr

Special teams

Pos.	#	Name	Class
K	10	Jonathan Barnes	Sr
P	18	Will Parker	Jr
K	34	Curphey Hardin	Fr
P	36	Davan Dyer	Jr
P/K	40	Brady Farlow	So
DS	46	Robert Trimber	Fr
P/K	53	Carson Wyld	Fr
DS	57	Tanner Borskey	Fr
DS	59	Cameron Linck	GS
DS	63	Reeves Blankenship	Fr

Head coach

- Skip Holtz

Coordinators/assistant coaches

- Joe Sloan (assistant head coach / inside receivers)
- Blake Baker (defensive coordinator / safeties)
- Todd Fitch (offensive coordinator / wide receivers)
- Kevin Curtis (cornerbacks)
- Lanier Goethie (linebackers)
- Robert McFarland (offensive line)
- Rick Petri (defensive line)
- Tim Rattay (quarterbacks)
- Tony Ball (running backs)

Legend

- (C) Team captain
- (S) Suspended
- (I) Ineligible
- Injured
- Redshirt

Roster
