= 2017 Middle Tennessee Blue Raiders football team =

American college football season

2017 Middle Tennessee Blue Raiders football

Camellia Bowl champion

Camellia Bowl, W 35–30 vs. Arkansas State
- Conference: Conference USA
- East Division
- Record: 7–6 (4–4 C-USA)
- Head coach: Rick Stockstill (12th season)
- Offensive coordinator: Tony Franklin (2nd season)
- Offensive scheme: Bear raid
- Defensive coordinator: Scott Shafer (1st season)
- Base defense: Multiple 4–3
- Home stadium: Johnny "Red" Floyd Stadium

2017 Conference USA football standings
	Conf.			Overall
Team	W		L	W		L
East Division
Florida Atlantic x$	8	–	0	11	–	3
FIU	5	–	3	8	–	5
Marshall	4	–	4	8	–	5
Middle Tennessee	4	–	4	7	–	6
Western Kentucky	4	–	4	6	–	7
Old Dominion	3	–	5	5	–	7
Charlotte	1	–	7	1	–	11
West Division
North Texas x	7	–	1	9	–	5
Southern Miss	6	–	2	8	–	5
UAB	6	–	2	8	–	5
Louisiana Tech	4	–	4	7	–	6
UTSA	3	–	5	6	–	5
Rice	1	–	7	1	–	11
UTEP	0	–	8	0	–	12
Championship: Florida Atlantic 41, North Texas 17
$ – Conference champion; x – Division champion/co-champions; Rankings from AP Poll

The 2017 Middle Tennessee Blue Raiders football team represented Middle Tennessee State University as a member of the East Division of Conference USA (C-USA) during the 2017 NCAA Division I FBS football season. Led by 12th-year head coach Rick Stockstill, the Blue Raiders compiled an overall record of 7–6 with a mark of 4–4 in conference play, tying for third place in the C-USA's East Division. Middle Tennessee was invited to the Camellia Bowl, where they defeated Arkansas State. The team played home games at Johnny "Red" Floyd Stadium in Murfreesboro, Tennessee.

== Schedule ==
Middle Tennessee announced its 2017 football schedule on January 26, 2017. The 2017 schedule consisted of six home and six away games in the regular season.

Date	Time	Opponent	Site	TV	Result	Attendance
September 2	7:00 p.m.	Vanderbilt*	Johnny "Red" Floyd Stadium; Murfreesboro, TN	CBSSN	L 6–28	26,717
September 9	2:30 p.m.	at Syracuse*	Carrier Dome; Syracuse, NY	ACCN Extra	W 30–23	29,731
September 16	2:30 p.m.	at Minnesota*	TCF Bank Stadium; Minneapolis, MN	BTN	L 3–34	43,727
September 23	6:00 p.m.	Bowling Green*	Johnny "Red" Floyd Stadium; Murfreesboro, TN	ESPN3	W 24–13	16,523
September 30	6:00 p.m.	at Florida Atlantic	FAU Stadium; Boca Raton, FL	Stadium	L 20–38	12,913
October 7	2:00 p.m.	FIU^{†}	Johnny "Red" Floyd Stadium; Murfreesboro, TN	ESPN3	W 37–17	15,527
October 14	5:30 p.m.	at UAB	Legion Field; Birmingham, AL	beIN	L 23–25	25,309
October 20	6:00 p.m.	Marshall	Johnny "Red" Floyd Stadium; Murfreesboro, TN	ESPN2	L 10–38	13,412
November 4	6:30 p.m.	UTEP	Johnny "Red" Floyd Stadium; Murfreesboro, TN	beIN	W 30–3	11,411
November 11	1:00 p.m.	at Charlotte	Jerry Richardson Stadium; Charlotte, NC	ESPN3	W 35–21	10,937
November 17	7:00 p.m.	at Western Kentucky	Houchens Industries–L. T. Smith Stadium; Bowling Green, KY (100 Miles of Hate)	CBSSN	L 38–41 ^{3OT}	12,612
November 25	2:00 p.m.	Old Dominion	Johnny "Red" Floyd Stadium; Murfreesboro, TN	ESPN3	W 41–10	10,128
December 16	7:00 p.m.	vs. Arkansas State*	Cramton Bowl; Montgomery, AL (Camellia Bowl)	ESPN	W 35–30	20,612
*Non-conference game; ^{†}Homecoming; All times are in Central time

== Game summaries ==
=== Vanderbilt ===
	1	2	3	4	Total
Commodores	14	7	7	0	28
Blue Raiders	0	0	0	6	6

=== At Syracuse ===
	1	2	3	4	Total
Blue Raiders	2	7	7	14	30
Orange	3	10	3	7	23

=== At Minnesota ===
	1	2	3	4	Total
Blue Raiders	0	3	0	0	3
Golden Gophers	3	17	7	7	34

=== Bowling Green ===
	1	2	3	4	Total
Falcons	7	3	3	0	13
Blue Raiders	7	14	0	3	24

=== At Florida Atlantic ===
	1	2	3	4	Total
Blue Raiders	6	0	7	7	20
Owls	14	10	0	14	38

=== FIU ===
	1	2	3	4	Total
Panthers	3	0	7	7	17
Blue Raiders	3	14	10	10	37

=== At UAB ===
	1	2	3	4	Total
Blue Raiders	10	10	3	0	23
Blazers	9	13	0	3	25

=== Marshall ===
	1	2	3	4	Total
Thundering Herd	7	24	0	7	38
Blue Raiders	3	7	0	0	10

=== UTEP ===
	1	2	3	4	Total
Miners	0	0	3	0	3
Blue Raiders	10	7	7	6	30

=== At Charlotte ===
	1	2	3	4	Total
Blue Raiders	14	14	0	7	35
49ers	7	0	7	7	21

=== At WKU ===
	1	2	3	4	OT	2OT	3OT	Total
Blue Raiders	0	3	0	21	7	7	0	38
Hilltoppers	7	0	3	14	7	7	3	41

=== Old Dominion ===
	1	2	3	4	Total
Monarchs	3	0	0	7	10
Blue Raiders	3	21	7	10	41

=== vs Arkansas State–Camellia Bowl ===
	1	2	3	4	Total
Blue Raiders	7	14	7	7	35
Red Wolves	3	7	7	13	30

== After the season ==
=== NFL draft ===
The following Blue Raider was selected in the 2018 NFL draft following the season.

Round	Pick	Player	Position	NFL club
7	240	Richie James	Wide receiver	San Francisco 49ers
