= 2017 UAB Blazers football team =

American college football season

2017 UAB Blazers football

Bahamas Bowl, L 6–41 vs. Ohio
- Conference: Conference USA
- West Division
- Record: 8–5 (6–2 C-USA)
- Head coach: Bill Clark (2nd season)
- Offensive coordinator: Les Koenning (1st season)
- Offensive scheme: Spread
- Defensive coordinator: David Reeves (1st season)
- Base defense: 3–3–5
- Home stadium: Legion Field

2017 Conference USA football standings
	Conf.			Overall
Team	W		L	W		L
East Division
Florida Atlantic x$	8	–	0	11	–	3
FIU	5	–	3	8	–	5
Marshall	4	–	4	8	–	5
Middle Tennessee	4	–	4	7	–	6
Western Kentucky	4	–	4	6	–	7
Old Dominion	3	–	5	5	–	7
Charlotte	1	–	7	1	–	11
West Division
North Texas x	7	–	1	9	–	5
Southern Miss	6	–	2	8	–	5
UAB	6	–	2	8	–	5
Louisiana Tech	4	–	4	7	–	6
UTSA	3	–	5	6	–	5
Rice	1	–	7	1	–	11
UTEP	0	–	8	0	–	12
Championship: Florida Atlantic 41, North Texas 17
$ – Conference champion; x – Division champion/co-champions; Rankings from AP Poll

The 2017 UAB Blazers football team represented the University of Alabama at Birmingham (UAB) as a member of the West Division in Conference USA (C-USA) during the 2017 NCAA Division I FBS football season. Led by second-year head coach Bill Clark, the Blazers compiled an overall record of 8–5 with a mark of 6–2 in conference play, tying for second place in C-USA's West Division. was invited to the Bahamas Bowl, where the Blazers lost to Ohio. The team played home games at Legion Field in Birmingham, Alabama.

The 2017 season marked the return of UAB football after a two-year hiatus following the elimination of the program in December 2014 and its subsequent reinstatement in July 2015.

== Schedule ==
Date	Time	Opponent	Site	TV	Result	Attendance
September 2	2:30 p.m.	Alabama A&M*	Legion Field; Birmingham, AL	Stadium	W 38–7	45,212
September 9	2:00 p.m.	at Ball State*	Scheumann Stadium; Muncie, IN	ESPN3	L 31–51	11,555
September 16	11:00 a.m.	Coastal Carolina*	Legion Field; Birmingham, AL	WBRC-TV	W 30–23	24,789
September 23	5:30 p.m.	at North Texas	Apogee Stadium; Denton, TX	beIN	L 43–46	20,142
October 7	3:00 p.m.	Louisiana Tech^{†}	Legion Field; Birmingham, AL	CUSA.tv	W 23–22	27,213
October 14	5:30 p.m.	Middle Tennessee	Legion Field; Birmingham, AL	beIN	W 25–23	25,309
October 21	5:30 p.m.	at Charlotte	Jerry Richardson Stadium; Charlotte, NC	beIN	L 24–25 ^{OT}	11,889
October 28	6:00 p.m.	at Southern Miss	M. M. Roberts Stadium; Hattiesburg, MS	CUSA.TV	W 30–12	19,101
November 4	2:00 p.m.	Rice	Legion Field; Birmingham, AL	CUSA.TV	W 52–21	21,224
November 11	6:00 p.m.	at UTSA	Alamodome; San Antonio, TX	CUSA.TV	W 24–19	20,076
November 18	3:00 p.m.	at Florida*	Ben Hill Griffin Stadium; Gainesville, FL	SECN	L 7–36	84,649
November 25	12:00 p.m.	UTEP	Legion Field; Birmingham, AL		W 28–7	14,505
December 22	11:30 a.m.	vs. Ohio*	Thomas Robinson Stadium; Nassau, Bahamas (Bahamas Bowl)	ESPN	L 6–41	13,585
*Non-conference game; ^{†}Homecoming; All times are in Central time

== Spring Game ==
The 2017 Spring Game took place at Legion Field, on April 1, at 1:00 p.m., and the Green team, composed of starters, defeated the Gold team 49–7 before 7,822 fans.

Date	Time	Spring Game	Site	TV	Result	Attendance
April 1	1:00 p.m.	Green vs. Gold	Legion Field • Birmingham, AL	WABM MY68	Green 49–7	7,822

== Game summaries ==
=== Alabama A&M ===
	1	2	3	4	Total
ALA&M Bulldogs	0	7	0	0	7
Blazers	7	3	14	14	38

=== At Ball State ===
	1	2	3	4	Total
Blazers	3	14	7	7	31
Cardinals	7	14	17	13	51

=== Coastal Carolina ===
	1	2	3	4	Total
Chanticleers	2	3	8	10	23
Blazers	13	3	7	7	30

=== At North Texas ===
	1	2	3	4	Total
Blazers	7	7	15	14	43
Mean Green	10	20	7	9	46

=== Louisiana Tech ===
	1	2	3	4	Total
Bulldogs	7	3	0	12	22
Blazers	13	3	0	7	23

=== Middle Tennessee ===
	1	2	3	4	Total
Blue Raiders	10	10	3	0	23
Blazers	9	13	0	3	25

=== At Charlotte ===
	1	2	3	4	OT	Total
Blazers	0	14	3	0	7	24
49ers	0	0	7	10	8	25

=== At Southern Miss ===
	1	2	3	4	Total
Blazers	7	0	6	17	30
Golden Eagles	9	3	0	0	12

=== Rice ===
	1	2	3	4	Total
Owls	0	7	0	14	21
Blazers	21	21	7	3	52

=== At UTSA ===
	1	2	3	4	Total
Blazers	14	7	0	3	24
Roadrunners	3	3	0	13	19

=== At Florida ===
	1	2	3	4	Total
Blazers	0	0	0	7	7
Gators	6	13	14	3	36

=== UTEP ===
	1	2	3	4	Total
Miners	7	0	0	0	7
Blazers	3	11	14	0	28

=== Vs. Ohio—Bahamas Bowl ===
	1	2	3	4	Total
Blazers	0	3	3	0	6
Bobcats	13	14	14	0	41
