= Junior Adams =

American football coach (born 1979)

Dallas Cowboys
- Title: Wide receivers coach

Personal information
- Born: October 20, 1979 (age 47); Fremont, California, U.S.
- Listed height: 5 ft 9 in (1.75 m)
- Listed weight: 168 lb (76 kg)

Career information
- Position: Wide receiver
- College: Boise State

Career history
- Montana State (2004–2006) Wide Receivers/Kick Returners; Prosser HS (Wash.) (2007) Wide Receivers/Kick Returners; Chattanooga (2008) Chattanooga; Eastern Washington (2009–2013) Wide receivers coach; Boise State (2014–2016) Wide Receivers/Passing Game Coordinator; Western Kentucky (2017–2018) Offensive coordinators/Wide Receivers; Washington (2019–2021) Wide receivers coach; Oregon (2022–2024) Co-Offensive Coordinator/Wide Receivers; Dallas Cowboys (2025–present) Wide Receivers Coach

Awards and highlights
- NCAA Division I FCS national champion (2010)

Alton Johnson Adams Jr. (born October 20, 1979) is an American football coach and former player who is currently the wide receivers coach for the Dallas Cowboys of the National Football League (NFL). He previously served as wide receivers coach and co-offensive coordinator for the Oregon Ducks.

== Early life and education ==
Junior Adams was born on October 20, 1979, in Fremont, California. After finishing high school as an All-American, Adams first played college football at Oregon State University, but he later transferred and finished his career at Montana State University. Adams graduated with a bachelor's degree in sociology.

== Coaching career ==
After graduating from Montana State, Adams became the wide receivers coach for the university from 2004 to 2006. After two years as a coach for Prosser High School, where he won a state championship in his sole year there, and Chattanooga, Adams became the wide receivers coach for Eastern Washington. Following a dominant four-year stint, highlighted by star Cooper Kupp, Adams left Eastern Washington to become a coach at Boise State. After being elevated to passing game coordinator at Boise State, Adams became the offensive coordinator for Western Kentucky. Adams left Western Kentucky in 2019 to a lower position, wide receivers coach, at Washington. Adams would later become offensive coordinator, however, becoming the co-offensive coordinator for Oregon in 2022.

On February 10, 2025, the Dallas Cowboys hired Adams to serve as their wide receivers coach.
