= 2017 Marshall Thundering Herd football team =

American college football season

2017 Marshall Thundering Herd football

New Mexico Bowl champion

New Mexico Bowl, W 31–28 vs. Colorado State
- Conference: Conference USA
- East Division
- Record: 8–5 (4–4 C-USA)
- Head coach: Doc Holliday (8th season)
- Offensive coordinator: Bill Legg (8th season)
- Offensive scheme: Spread
- Defensive coordinator: Chuck Heater (5th season)
- Base defense: 3–4
- Home stadium: Joan C. Edwards Stadium

2017 Conference USA football standings
	Conf.			Overall
Team	W		L	W		L
East Division
Florida Atlantic x$	8	–	0	11	–	3
FIU	5	–	3	8	–	5
Marshall	4	–	4	8	–	5
Middle Tennessee	4	–	4	7	–	6
Western Kentucky	4	–	4	6	–	7
Old Dominion	3	–	5	5	–	7
Charlotte	1	–	7	1	–	11
West Division
North Texas x	7	–	1	9	–	5
Southern Miss	6	–	2	8	–	5
UAB	6	–	2	8	–	5
Louisiana Tech	4	–	4	7	–	6
UTSA	3	–	5	6	–	5
Rice	1	–	7	1	–	11
UTEP	0	–	8	0	–	12
Championship: Florida Atlantic 41, North Texas 17
$ – Conference champion; x – Division champion/co-champions; Rankings from AP Poll

The 2017 Marshall Thundering Herd football team represented Marshall University in the 2017 NCAA Division I FBS football season. The Thundering Herd played their home games at the Joan C. Edwards Stadium in Huntington, West Virginia, and competed in the East Division of Conference USA (C–USA). They were led by eighth-year head coach Doc Holliday. They finished the season 8–5, 4–4 in C-USA play to finish in a three-way tie for third place in the East Division. They were invited to the New Mexico Bowl where they defeated Colorado State.

== Schedule ==
Marshall announced its 2017 football schedule on January 26, 2017. The 2017 schedule consists of 6 home and away games in the regular season. The Thundering Herd would host CUSA foes FIU, Old Dominion, Southern Miss, and Western Kentucky (WKU), and would travel to Charlotte, Florida Atlantic, Middle Tennessee, and UTSA.

The Thundering Herd would host two of the four non-conference opponents, Kent State and Miami of Ohio, both from the Mid-American Conference and traveled to Cincinnati of the American Athletic Conference and NC State of the Atlantic Coast Conference.

Date	Time	Opponent	Site	TV	Result	Attendance
September 2	6:30 p.m.	Miami (OH)*	Joan C. Edwards Stadium; Huntington, WV	Stadium	W 31–26	22,463
September 9	6:00 p.m.	at NC State*	Carter–Finley Stadium; Raleigh, NC	ACCN Extra	L 20–37	57,430
September 16	6:30 p.m.	Kent State*	Joan C. Edwards Stadium; Huntington, WV	CUSA.TV/WCHS/WVAH	W 21–0	24,044
September 30	7:00 p.m.	at Cincinnati*	Nippert Stadium; Cincinnati, OH	ESPN3	W 38–21	35,736
October 7	6:00 p.m.	at Charlotte	Jerry Richardson Stadium; Charlotte, NC	WQCW	W 14–3	10,584
October 14	2:30 p.m.	Old Dominion^{†}	Joan C. Edwards Stadium; Huntington, WV	ESPN3	W 35–3	26,097
October 20	7:00 p.m.	at Middle Tennessee	Johnny "Red" Floyd Stadium; Murfreesboro, TN	ESPN2	W 38–10	13,412
October 28	2:30 p.m.	FIU	Joan C. Edwards Stadium; Huntington, WV	Stadium	L 30–41	19,966
November 3	6:00 p.m.	at Florida Atlantic	FAU Stadium; Boca Raton, FL	CBSSN	L 25–30	15,880
November 11	6:30 p.m.	Western Kentucky	Joan C. Edwards Stadium; Huntington, WV	beIN	W 30–23	19,516
November 18	7:00 p.m.	at UTSA	Alamodome; San Antonio, TX	Stadium	L 7–9	20,148
November 25	2:30 p.m.	Southern Miss	Joan C. Edwards Stadium; Huntington, WV	Stadium	L 27–28	18,361
December 16	4:30 p.m.	vs. Colorado State*	Dreamstyle Stadium; Albuquerque, NM (New Mexico Bowl)	ESPN	W 31–28	26,087
*Non-conference game; ^{†}Homecoming; All times are in Eastern time

Schedule source:

== Game summaries ==
=== Miami (OH) ===
	1	2	3	4	Total
RedHawks	3	10	7	6	26
Thundering Herd	7	14	7	3	31

=== At NC State ===
	1	2	3	4	Total
Thundering Herd	10	10	0	0	20
Wolfpack	3	20	7	7	37

=== Kent State ===
	1	2	3	4	Total
Golden Flashes	0	0	0	0	0
Thundering Herd	0	7	0	14	21

=== At Cincinnati ===
	1	2	3	4	Total
Thundering Herd	7	17	7	7	38
Bearcats	0	0	7	14	21

=== At Charlotte ===
	1	2	3	4	Total
Thundering Herd	7	0	7	0	14
49ers	0	0	3	0	3

=== Old Dominion ===
	1	2	3	4	Total
Monarchs	0	3	0	0	3
Thundering Herd	0	7	7	21	35

=== At Middle Tennessee ===
	1	2	3	4	Total
Thundering Herd	7	24	0	7	38
Blue Raiders	3	7	0	0	10

=== FIU ===
	1	2	3	4	Total
Panthers	14	14	7	6	41
Thundering Herd	0	7	7	16	30

=== At Florida Atlantic ===
	1	2	3	4	Total
Thundering Herd	0	3	13	9	25
Owls	13	3	7	7	30

=== Western Kentucky ===
	1	2	3	4	Total
Hilltoppers	7	0	3	13	23
Thundering Herd	0	13	17	0	30

=== At UTSA ===
	1	2	3	4	Total
Thundering Herd	0	0	0	7	7
Roadrunners	3	3	0	3	9

=== Southern Miss ===
	1	2	3	4	Total
Golden Eagles	0	14	7	7	28
Thundering Herd	0	14	7	6	27

=== Colorado State–Gildan New Mexico Bowl ===
	1	2	3	4	Total
Thundering Herd	0	21	10	0	31
Rams	0	14	0	14	28
