= Mason Fine =

American gridiron football player (born 1997)

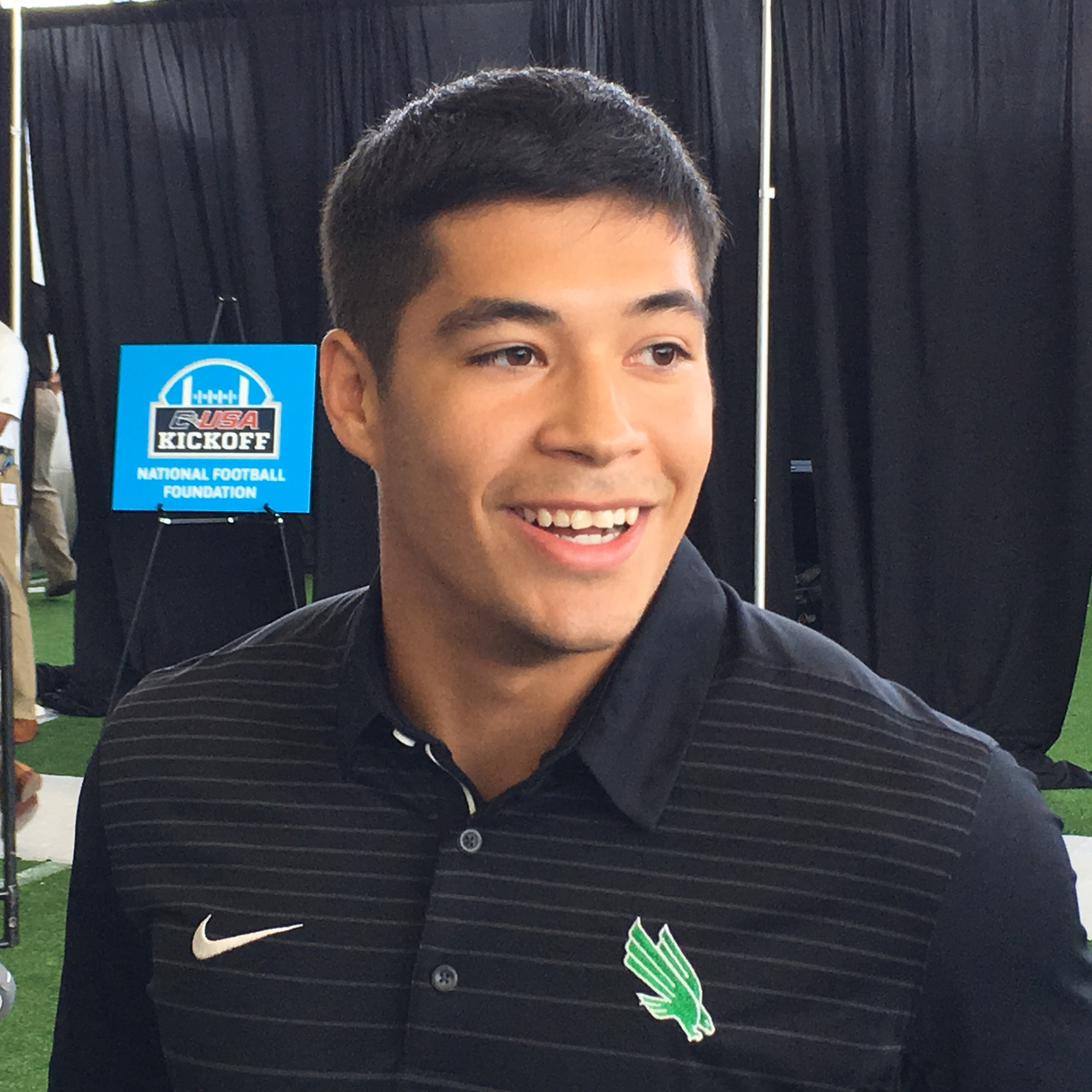
- Fine at 2018 C-USA Football Kickoff

No. 8
- Position: Quarterback

Personal information
- Born: April 19, 1997 (age 29); Peggs, Oklahoma, U.S.
- Listed height: 5 ft 11 in (1.80 m)
- Listed weight: 190 lb (86 kg)

Career information
- High school: Locust Grove (Locust Grove, Oklahoma)
- College: North Texas (2016–2019)
- NFL draft: 2020: undrafted

Career history

Playing
- Saskatchewan Roughriders (2021–2023)

Coaching
- Muskogee (OK) (2025–present) Offensive coordinator / Quarterback coach

Awards and highlights
- 2× CUSA Offensive Player of the Year (2017, 2018); 2× First-team All-CUSA (2017, 2018); Second-team All-CUSA (2019); All-CUSA Freshman team (2016); 2× Oklahoma Gatorade HS Player of the Year (2014, 2015)

Career CFL statistics
- Passing completions: 167
- Passing attempts: 249
- Passing yards: 1,803
- TD–INT: 6–8
- Stats at CFL.ca

Mason Quinn Fine (born April 19, 1997) is an American former professional football quarterback. He played in the Canadian Football League (CFL) for the Saskatchewan Roughriders, and played college football for the North Texas Mean Green. He currently serves as the offensive coordinator and quarterback coach for Muskogee High School in Muskogee, Oklahoma.

== Early life ==
Fine, who is one-quarter Cherokee, grew up in Peggs, Oklahoma. He has Cherokee lineage on both sides of his family and is an enrolled citizen of the Cherokee Nation. According to a 2020 story by Yahoo Sports journalist Jeff Eisenberg, Fine's development as a quarterback began in the summer before his sixth-grade year, during which he attended a quarterback camp at the University of Oklahoma. The young Fine paid special attention to former Oklahoma star quarterback and then-current Sooners assistant Josh Heupel, observing Heupel's throwing motion and paying attention to the advice he offered. During each day's drive home from the camp, he wrote down what he had learned. After the camp, Fine and his father Dale typed up the notes, and he went so far as to place a printed copy next to his bed.

Fine was initially trained by his father, who had never played football at any level. Each day, the two would teach one another proper throwing motion via the notes they took at the aforementioned camp. In Eisenberg's story, Dale recalled, "It was hours and days and months and years of repetition. The motto we went by was that it wasn’t just practice that made perfect. It was perfect practice that made perfect." By the time Mason finished his eighth-grade year, they no longer worked on his mechanics. The following summer, he attended a quarterback camp at which an instructor praised his throwing motion and asked about his quarterbacks coach. Eisenberg noted, "The instructor couldn’t believe it was his dad, let alone that Dale Fine had no previous football experience."

=== High school ===
Since his hometown of fewer than 1,000 operated only a K–8 school, Fine had a choice between several nearby high schools, and enrolled at Locust Grove High School in Locust Grove in 2012. The Pirates had just hired a new head coach Matt Hennesy after winning only two games in the previous three seasons. Eisenberg noted that the new coach had to make a decision regarding his new talent—while Fine was the team's best passer, "Hennesy feared putting a 5-foot-9, 135-pound freshman behind a patchwork offensive line." Hennesy decided to start Fine as a wide receiver, but designed a series of trick plays to utilize Fine's throwing ability; Fine threw for more than 600 yards as a freshman despite not playing quarterback. He went on to start at quarterback in his remaining three high school seasons, setting the all-time Oklahoma high school record for passing yards and touchdowns and becoming the first player to ever win the state's Gatorade Player of the Year award twice.

==== Recruitment ====
Despite his gaudy high school statistics, Fine finished his senior season without a single scholarship offer, largely due to his lack of size. During a summer camp before his senior season, an assistant for Arkansas State pulled him aside, praising his arm strength and ability to escape a collapsing pocket. However, he then told Fine that his small size made it unlikely that he would ever play at a Division I FBS school, instead offering to recommend him to Division I FCS or Division II schools. Fine would tell Eisenberg, "I was polite and told him that I appreciated it, but inside I was fuming." This coach was not alone in his sentiment; Fine went without an offer even after sending out numerous highlight tapes and attending camps at four other FBS schools. Rice showed strong interest after Fine's junior season, but went with a considerably taller prospect; Oklahoma State recruited him only as a walk-on, and did not make him an offer even after its main quarterback target rescinded a verbal commitment to the school; and when Hennesy called Kansas State's Bill Snyder about Fine, Snyder responded that he didn't recruit quarterbacks under 6 feet tall.

Fine caught a break when North Texas hired Seth Littrell as head coach shortly after the end of the 2015 season. Littrell, a former Oklahoma player who grew up in Muskogee, Oklahoma, was a close friend of Hennesy who operated an Air Raid offense similar to the one that Fine quarterbacked at Locust Grove. Shortly after his hiring, Littrell called Hennesy to ask about available quarterbacks; while North Texas had an incoming graduate transfer from Alabama for the 2016 season, Littrell sought a future prospect. Littrell and his staff were sold on Fine's ability; he would tell Eisenberg,

There were local kids with Power Five offers who were calling us because they wanted to play in our system, but he was better than them. To be honest, we kept laughing because it wasn’t even close. If this kid was 6–2 or 6–3, he’d have been offered by everyone in the country.

Sensing that this was his best chance at an FBS offer, Fine made makeshift lifts for his shoes in order to appear taller for his North Texas visit. For his part, Littrell would say, "He could have shown up in combat boots with four-inch heels and we’d have taken him." On February 3, 2016, Fine signed a National Letter of Intent with North Texas.

== College career ==
=== North Texas ===
Fine started nine games for North Texas as a true freshman in 2016, throwing for 1,572 yards and breaking the school record for longest play from scrimmage with an 80-yard touchdown run against UTSA to earn a spot on the Conference USA All-Freshman team. Over his sophomore and junior years, Fine led the Mean Green to 9 victories in each season and threw for a total of 7,845 yards and 58 touchdowns. He earned back-to-back CUSA Offensive Player of the Year awards and broke the school's career passing yards record along the way. Going into Fine's senior season in 2019, he was named as the top college quarterback in Texas by Dave Campbell's Texas Football and received national media attention for the Heisman campaign started on his behalf by the UNT athletic department.

=== Statistics ===
Season	Team	GP	Passing					
Season	Team	GP	Cmp	Att	Pct	Yds	TD	Int
2016	North Texas	10	155	261	59.4	1,572	6	5
2017	North Texas	14	324	511	64.0	4,052	31	15
2018	North Texas	13	303	469	64.6	3,793	27	5
2019	North Texas	11	235	380	61.8	2,820	27	7
Career		48	1,017	1,621	62.7	12,237	91	32

== Professional career ==
After going undrafted in the 2020 NFL draft, Fine had a tryout with the Chicago Bears on August 17, 2020.

Fine had been on the Saskatchewan Roughriders' negotiation list since 2017. He signed a three-year contract with the CFL team on December 30, 2020.

Fine spent the majority of his first season in the CFL on the practice roster. On November 19, 2021, he was promoted to the active roster to replace Paxton Lynch. Fine dressed for the final regular season game, and completed 5 passes for 64 yards. He also dressed in the West Semi-Final and West Final as the team's backup quarterback.

On October 19, 2022, it was announced that Fine would be the Riders' starting quarterback for their penultimate match of the 2022 regular season against the Calgary Stampeders. In his first CFL start, Fine completed 18 of 28 pass attempts for 196 yards with one touchdown. The Riders were defeated, resulting in Saskatchewan missing the playoffs for the first time since 2016. He also started the team's final game of the regular season, a 36–10 loss in Calgary.

Fine began the 2023 season as the backup quarterback to veteran Trevor Harris. When Harris suffered a serious knee injury in Week 6, Fine finished the game, and started the next four games. In the fourth start, a game in Montreal on August 11, Fine left the game with injury in the second quarter and did not return. He missed four games with injury, and would dress for the final five games of the regular season, only seeing action in one game.

On January 23, 2024, Fine signed a two-year contract extension with the Roughriders. However, he was part of final training camp cuts and was released on June 1.

=== CFL career statistics ===
Year	Team	Games		Passing								Rushing			
Year	Team	GP	GS	Cmp	Att	Pct	Yds	Y/A	TD	Int	Rtg	Att	Yds	Avg	TD
2021	SSK	1	0	5	9	55.6	64	7.1	0	0	78.0	0	0	0	0
2022	SSK	17	2	67	102	65.7	690	6.8	3	3	82.6	9	52	5.8	0
2023	SSK	14	4	95	138	68.8	1,049	7.6	3	5	83.3	10	57	5.7	0

== Coaching career ==
On January 24, 2025, Fine was hired to serve as the offensive coordinator and quarterback coach at Muskogee High School in Muskogee, Oklahoma.
