= 2018 NFL draft =

2018 American football draft

General information
- Date: April 26–28, 2018
- Location: AT&T Stadium; Arlington, Texas
- Networks: ESPN/ABC, ESPN2, Fox/NFL Network

Overview
- 256 total selections in 7 rounds
- League: NFL
- First selection: Baker Mayfield, QB; Cleveland Browns
- Mr. Irrelevant: Trey Quinn, WR; Washington Redskins
- Most selections (12): Baltimore Ravens
- Fewest selections (4): Tennessee Titans

The 2018 NFL draft was the 83rd annual meeting of National Football League (NFL) franchises to select newly eligible players for the 2018 NFL season. The draft was held on April 26–28 at AT&T Stadium in Arlington southwest of Dallas; it was the first draft to take place in an NFL stadium and the first to be held in Texas. In order to be eligible to enter the draft, players must be at least three years removed from high school. The deadline for underclassmen to declare for the draft was January 15, 2018.

Five quarterbacks were selected in the first round—Baker Mayfield, Sam Darnold, Josh Allen, Josh Rosen, and Lamar Jackson—the second highest amount (along with the 1999 and 2021 drafts) after the six selected in 1983 and 2024. As of 2026, only Allen and Jackson have remained with their original teams, while Mayfield and Darnold had greater success on other teams. Darnold is the only quarterback to have led his team to a Super Bowl title. The draft was also the first to have siblings—safety Terrell Edmunds and linebacker Tremaine Edmunds—selected in its first round.

The 2018 NFL draft was the first of two professional sports drafts to be held in the Dallas–Fort Worth metroplex during the calendar year, as the Dallas Stars hosted the 2018 NHL draft in June.

== Early entrants ==
In order to be eligible to enter the draft, players must be at least three years removed from high school. The deadline for underclassmen to declare for the draft was January 15, 2018.

== Player selections ==
The following is the breakdown of the 256 players selected by position:

- 39 linebackers
- 33 wide receivers
- 29 cornerbacks
- 23 defensive ends
- 20 running backs
- 20 defensive tackles
- 21 offensive tackles
- 18 safeties
- 14 tight ends
- 13 quarterbacks
- 9 guards
- 8 centers
- 4 punters
- 2 placekickers
- 2 fullbacks
- 1 long snapper

*	Compensatory selection
†	Pro Bowler (Note: Players are identified as Pro Bowlers if they were selected for the Pro Bowl at any time in their career.)

Positions key
Offense	Defense	Special teams
QB — Quarterback; RB — Running back; FB — Fullback; WR — Wide receiver; TE — Tight end; OL — Offensive lineman; T — Tackle; G — Guard; C — Center	DL — Defensive lineman; DT — Defensive tackle (Note: Includes nose tackle (NT)); DE — Defensive end; EDGE — Edge rusher; LB — Linebacker (Note: Includes middle linebacker (MLB/MIKE), weakside linebacker (WILL), strongside linebacker (SAM), off-ball linebacker, and outside linebacker (OLB)); DB — Defensive back; CB — Cornerback; S — Safety (Note: Includes free safety (FS) and strong safety (SS))	K — Kicker (Note: Also known as a placekicker (PK)); P — Punter; LS — Long snapper; RS — Return specialist (Note: Includes kickoff and punt returners)

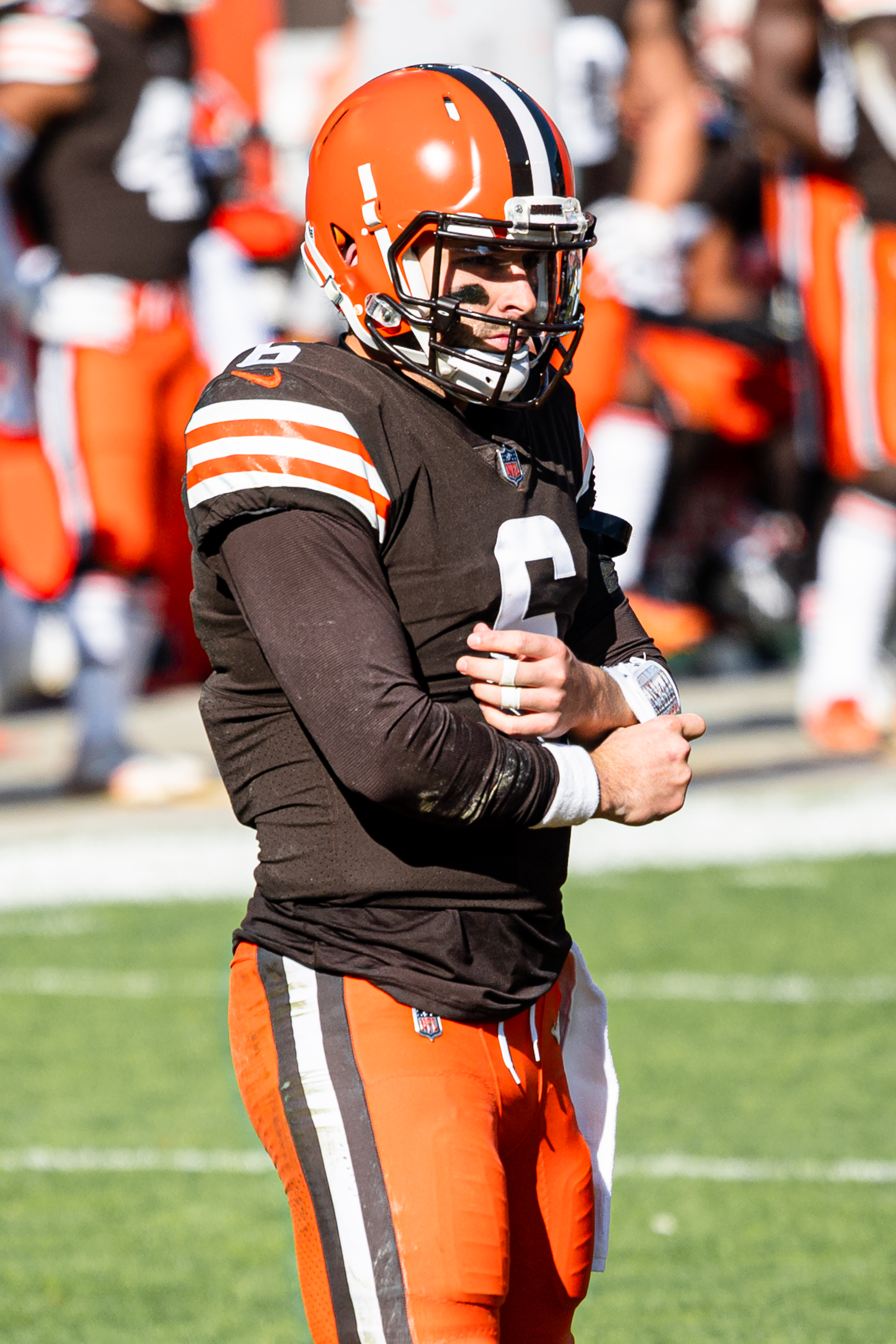
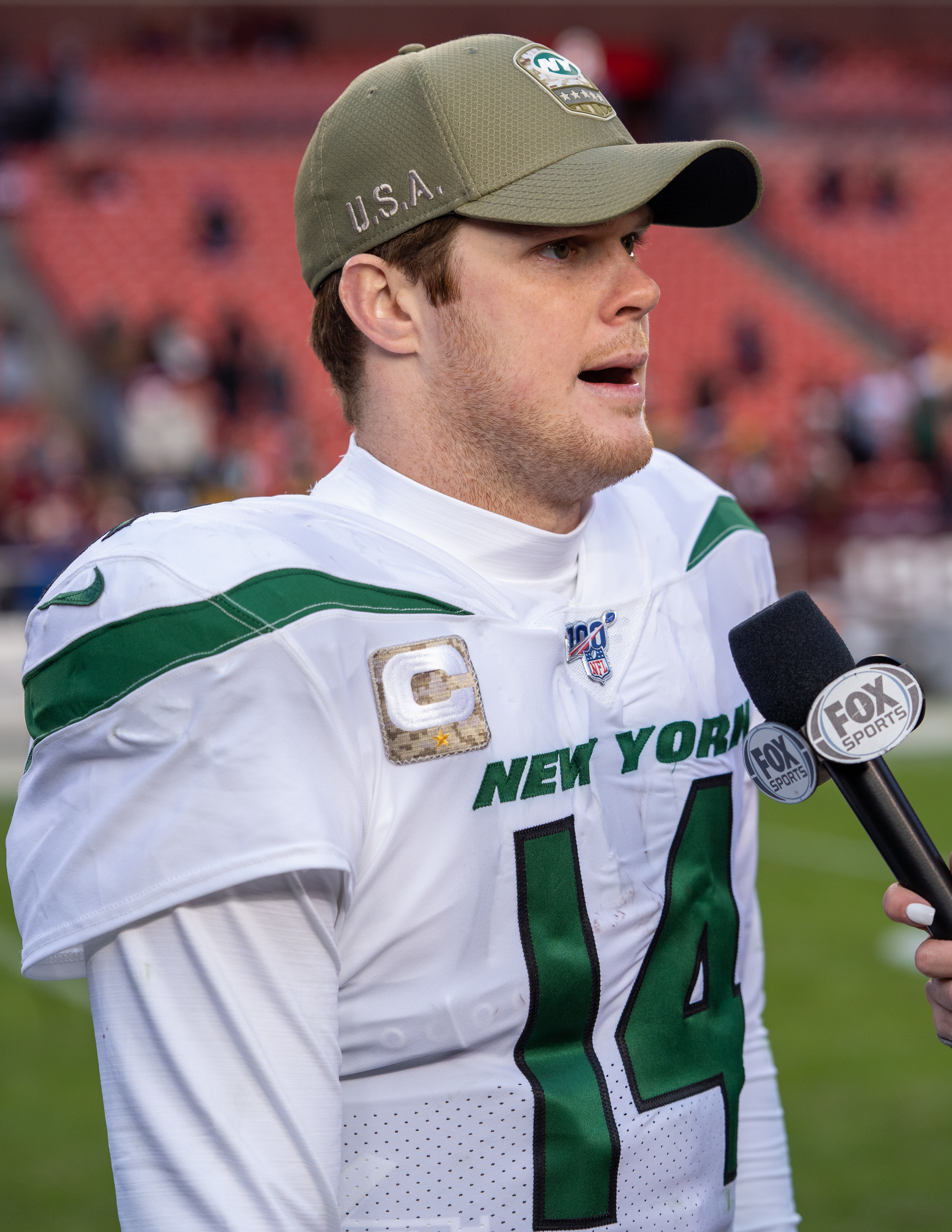
Quarterbacks Baker Mayfield (top) and Sam Darnold (bottom) were traded away from their original teams before experiencing mid-career success with subsequent teams, with Darnold becoming the first quarterback from the draft to start in and win the Super Bowl.
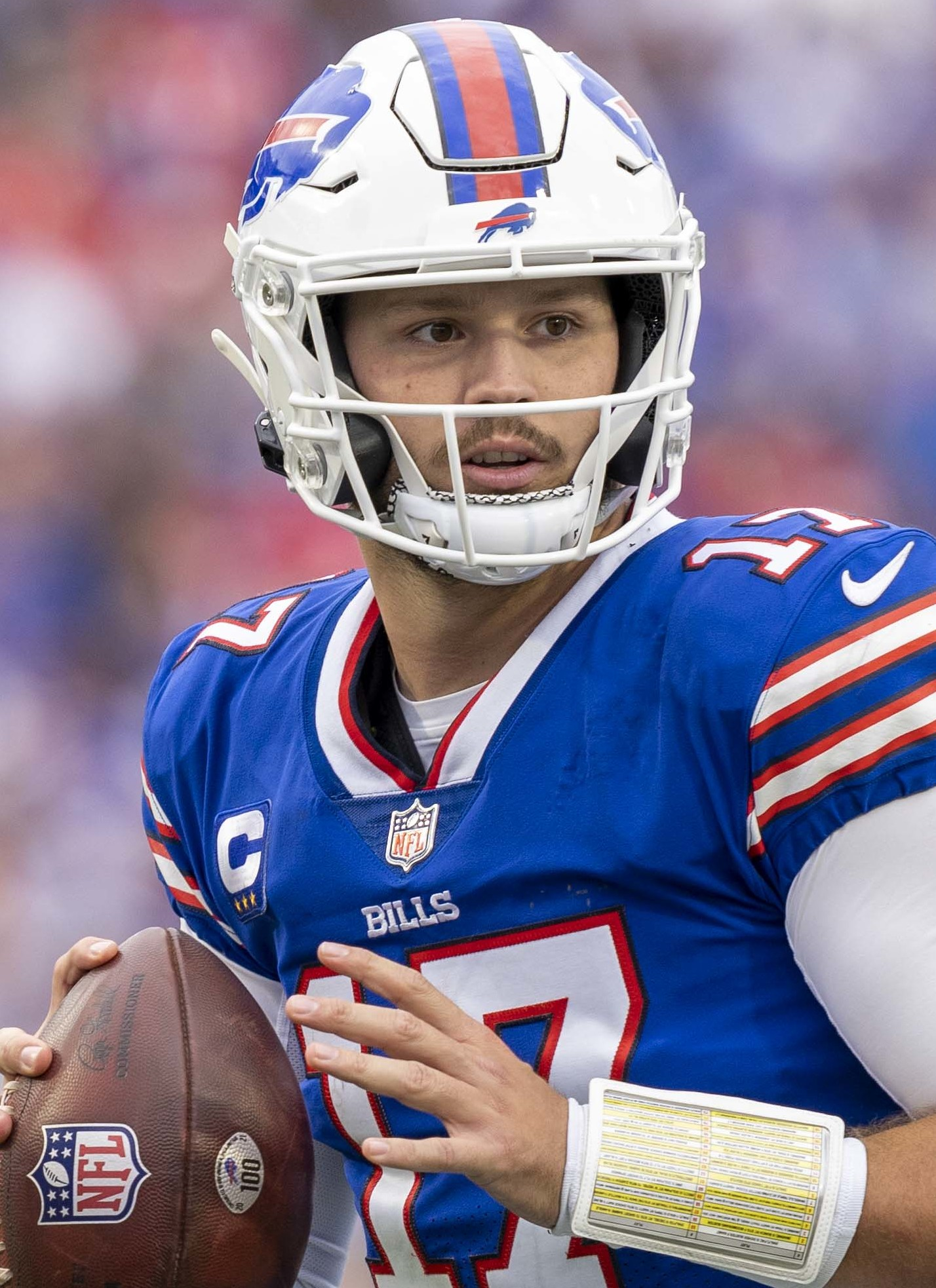
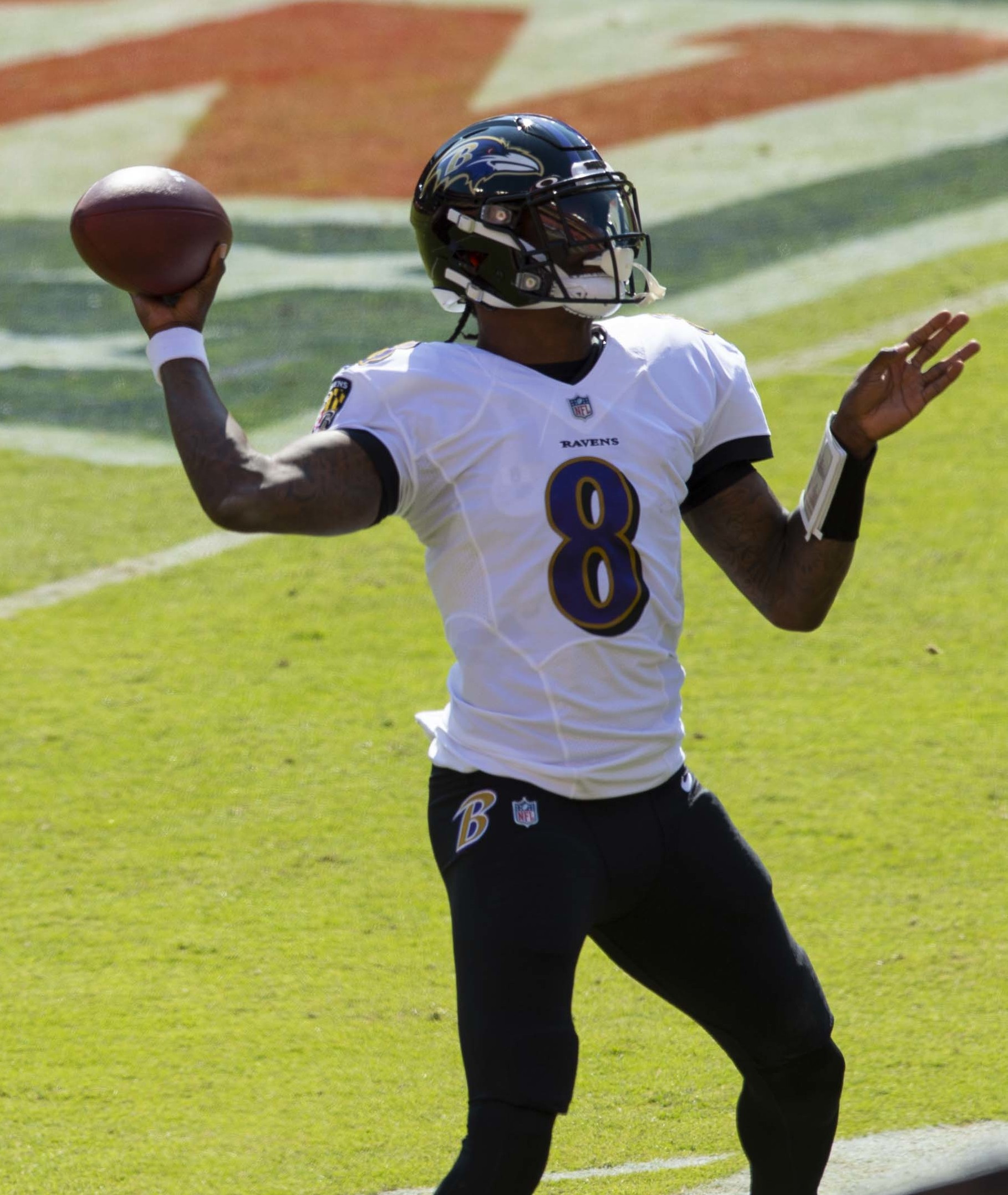
Quarterbacks Josh Allen (top) and Lamar Jackson (bottom) became franchise quarterbacks for their teams, breaking franchise passing records, making multiple playoff appearances and combining for three NFL MVP Awards.
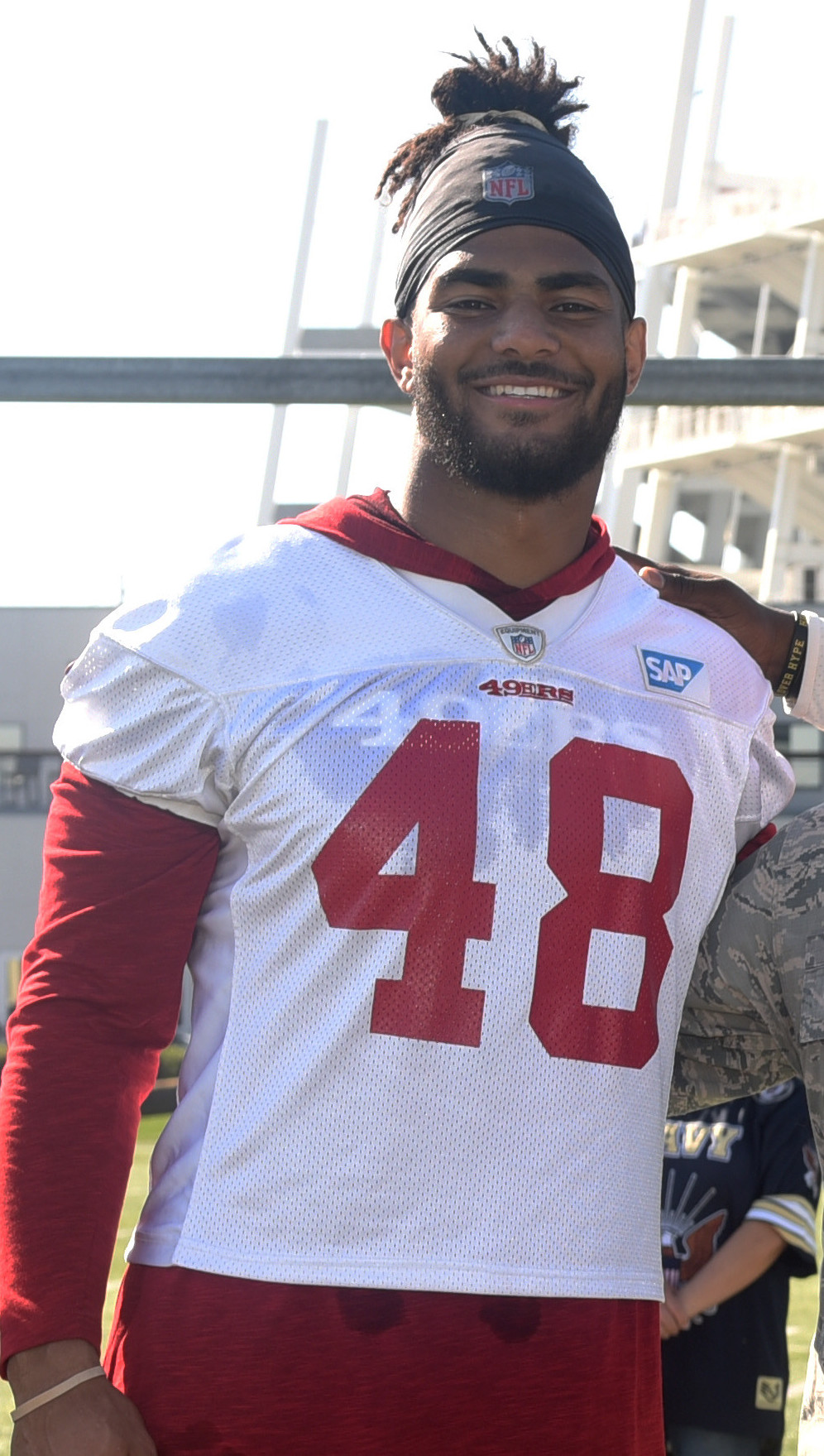
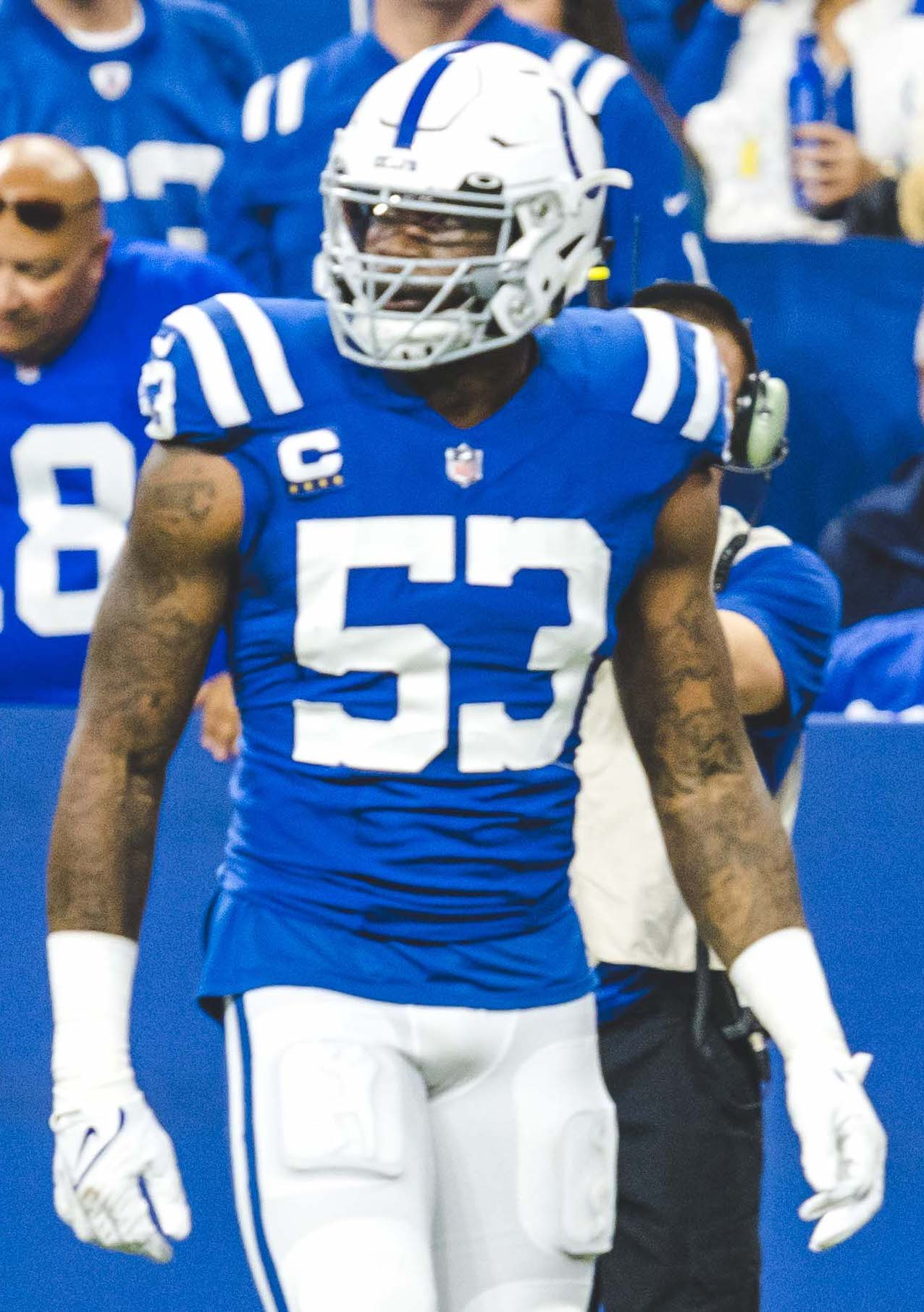
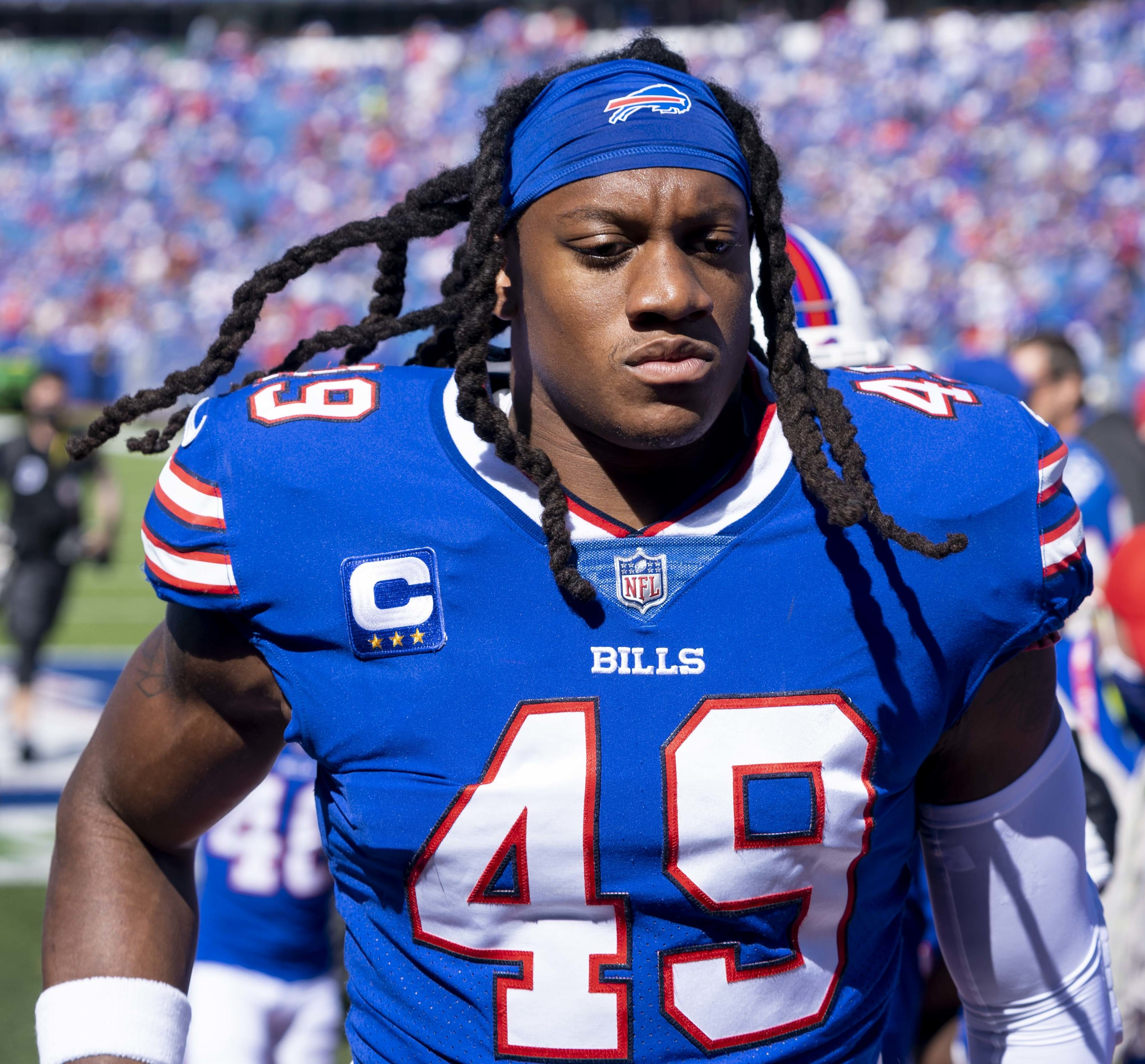
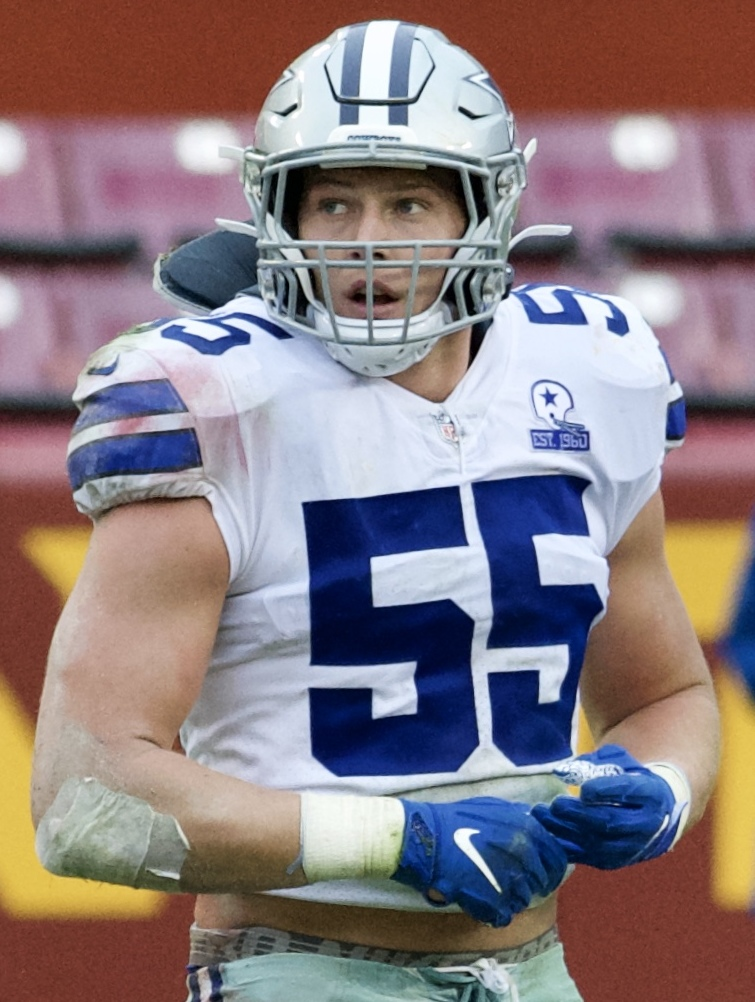
Notable linebackers include (from top to bottom) Fred Warner, 2018 Defensive Rookie of the Year Shaquille Leonard, Tremaine Edmunds and Leighton Vander Esch

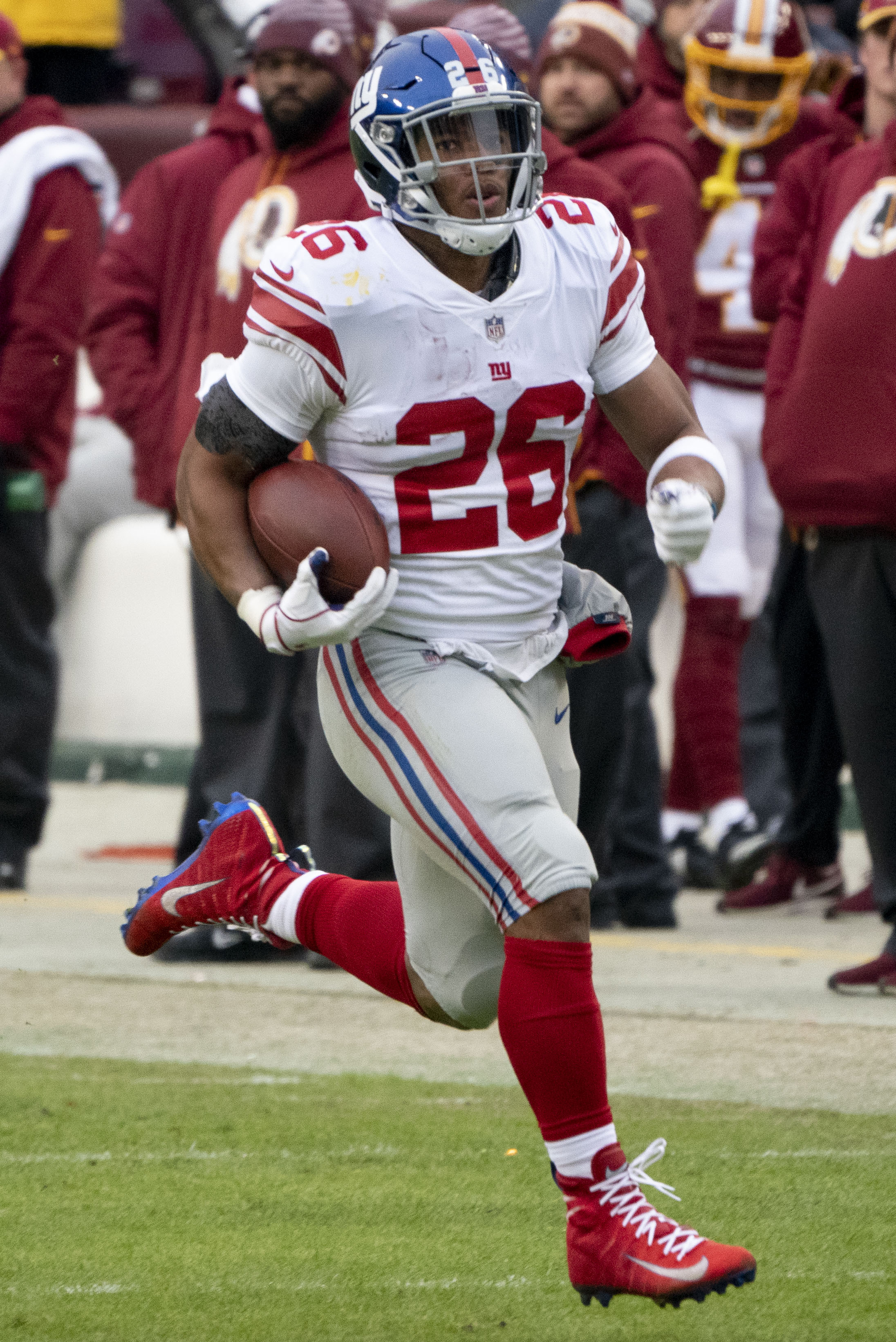
2018 Offensive Rookie of the Year & 2024 Offensive Player of the Year Saquon Barkley

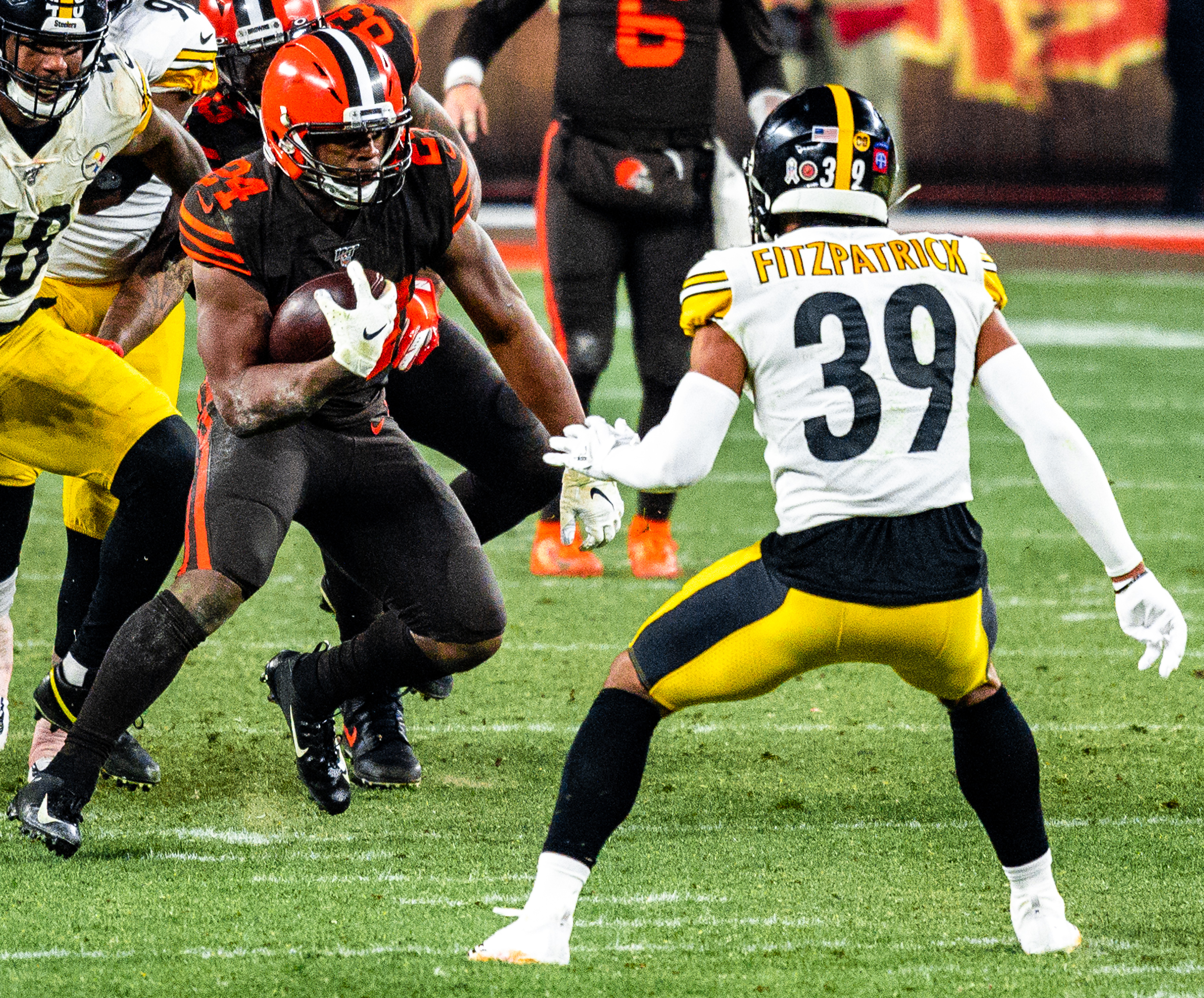
Second-round running back Nick Chubb (#24) running, first-round safety Minkah Fitzpatrick (#39) is defending; Chubb is a four-time Pro Bowler, while Fitzpatrick is a three-time Pro Bowler and has been named an All-Pro three times

Rnd.	Pick	Team	Player	Pos.	College	Notes
1	1	Cleveland Browns	Baker Mayfield ^{†}	QB	Oklahoma	2017 Heisman Trophy winner
1	2	New York Giants	Saquon Barkley ^{†}	RB	Penn State	2018 NFL Offensive Rookie of the Year; 2024 NFL Offensive Player of the Year
1	3	New York Jets	Sam Darnold ^{†}	QB	USC	from Indianapolis (Note: No. 3: Indianapolis → NY Jets (PD). Indianapolis traded a first-round selection (3rd overall) to the NY Jets in exchange for a first-round selection (6th overall) and two second-round selections (37th and 49th overall), and a 2019 second-round selection.)
1	4	Cleveland Browns	Denzel Ward ^{†}	CB	Ohio State	from Houston (Note: No. 4: Houston → Cleveland (PD). Houston traded a first-round selection (4th overall) and a 2017 first-round selection to Cleveland in exchange for a 2017 first-round selection.)
1	5	Denver Broncos	Bradley Chubb ^{†}	DE	NC State	
1	6	Indianapolis Colts	Quenton Nelson ^{†}	G	Notre Dame	from NY Jets (Note: No. 6: NY Jets → Indianapolis (PD). See Round 1: Indianapolis → NY Jets.)
1	7	Buffalo Bills	Josh Allen ^{†}	QB	Wyoming	from Tampa Bay (Note: No. 7: Tampa Bay → Buffalo (D). Tampa Bay traded first- and seventh-round selections (7th and 255th overall) to Buffalo in exchange for a first-round selection and two second-round selections (12th, 53rd and 56th overall).); 2024 NFL MVP
1	8	Chicago Bears	Roquan Smith ^{†}	LB	Georgia	
1	9	San Francisco 49ers	Mike McGlinchey	T	Notre Dame	
1	10	Arizona Cardinals	Josh Rosen	QB	UCLA	from Oakland (Note: No. 10: Oakland → Arizona (D). Oakland traded a first-round selection (10th overall) to Arizona in exchange for first-, third- and fifth-round selections (15th, 79th and 152nd overall).)
1	11	Miami Dolphins	Minkah Fitzpatrick ^{†}	S	Alabama	
1	12	Tampa Bay Buccaneers	Vita Vea ^{†}	NT	Washington	from Cincinnati via Buffalo (Note: No. 12: Cincinnati → Buffalo → Tampa Bay. Multiple trades: Cincinnati → Buffalo (PD). Cincinnati traded first- and sixth-round selections (12th and 187th overall) to Buffalo in exchange for first- and fifth-round selections (21st and 158th overall), and OT Cordy Glenn. Buffalo → Tampa Bay (D). See Round 1: Tampa Bay → Buffalo.)
1	13	Washington Redskins	Daron Payne ^{†}	NT	Alabama	
1	14	New Orleans Saints	Marcus Davenport	DE	UTSA	from Green Bay (Note: No. 14: Green Bay → New Orleans (D). Green Bay traded a first-round selection (14th overall) to New Orleans in exchange for first- and fifth-round selections (27th and 147th overall), and a 2019 first-round selection.)
1	15	Oakland Raiders	Kolton Miller	T	UCLA	from Arizona (Note: No. 15: Arizona → Oakland (D). See Round 1: Oakland → Arizona.)
1	16	Buffalo Bills	Tremaine Edmunds ^{†}	LB	Virginia Tech	from Baltimore (Note: No. 16: Baltimore → Buffalo (D). Baltimore traded first- and fifth-round selections (16th and 154th overall) to Buffalo in exchange for first- and third-round selections (22nd and 65th overall).)
1	17	Los Angeles Chargers	Derwin James ^{†}	S	Florida State	
1	18	Green Bay Packers	Jaire Alexander ^{†}	CB	Louisville	from Seattle (Note: No. 18: Seattle → Green Bay (D). Seattle traded first- and seventh-round selections (18th and 248th overall) to Green Bay in exchange for first-, third- and sixth-round selections (27th, 76th and 186th overall).)
1	19	Dallas Cowboys	Leighton Vander Esch ^{†}	LB	Boise State	
1	20	Detroit Lions	Frank Ragnow ^{†}	C	Arkansas	
1	21	Cincinnati Bengals	Billy Price	C	Ohio State	from Buffalo (Note: No. 21: Buffalo → Cincinnati (PD). See Round 1: Cincinnati → Buffalo.)
1	22	Tennessee Titans	Rashaan Evans	LB	Alabama	from Kansas City via Buffalo and Baltimore (Note: No. 22: Kansas City → Buffalo → Baltimore → Tennessee. Multiple trades: Kansas City → Buffalo (PD). Kansas City traded a first-round selection (22nd overall), and 2017 first- and third-round selections to Buffalo in exchange for a 2017 first-round selection. Buffalo → Baltimore (D). See Round 1: Baltimore → Buffalo. Baltimore → Tennessee (D). Baltimore traded first- and sixth-round selections (22nd and 215th overall) to Tennessee in exchange for first- and fourth-round selections (25th and 125th overall).)
1	23	New England Patriots	Isaiah Wynn	T	Georgia	from LA Rams (Note: No. 23: LA Rams → New England (PD). The LA Rams traded first- and sixth-round selections (23rd and 198th overall) to New England in exchange for a fourth-round selection (136th overall) and WR Brandin Cooks.)
1	24	Carolina Panthers	D. J. Moore	WR	Maryland	
1	25	Baltimore Ravens	Hayden Hurst	TE	South Carolina	from Tennessee (Note: No. 25: Tennessee → Baltimore (D). See Round 1: Baltimore → Tennessee.)
1	26	Atlanta Falcons	Calvin Ridley	WR	Alabama	
1	27	Seattle Seahawks	Rashaad Penny	RB	San Diego State	from New Orleans via Green Bay (Note: No. 27: New Orleans → Green Bay → Seattle. Multiple trades: New Orleans → Green Bay (D). See Round 1: Green Bay → New Orleans. Green Bay → Seattle (D). See Round 1: Seattle → Green Bay.)
1	28	Pittsburgh Steelers	Terrell Edmunds	S	Virginia Tech	
1	29	Jacksonville Jaguars	Taven Bryan	DT	Florida	
1	30	Minnesota Vikings	Mike Hughes	CB	UCF	
1	31	New England Patriots	Sony Michel	RB	Georgia	
1	32	Baltimore Ravens	Lamar Jackson ^{†}	QB	Louisville	from Philadelphia (Note: No. 32: Philadelphia → Baltimore (D). Philadelphia traded first- and fourth-round selections (32nd and 132nd overall) to Baltimore in exchange for second- and fourth-round selections (52nd and 125th overall), and a 2019 second-round selection.); 2016 Heisman Trophy winner 2019 and 2023 NFL MVP
2	33	Cleveland Browns	Austin Corbett	T	Nevada	
2	34	New York Giants	Will Hernandez	G	UTEP	
2	35	Cleveland Browns	Nick Chubb ^{†}	RB	Georgia	from Houston (Note: No. 35: Houston → Cleveland (PD). Houston traded a second-round selection (35th overall), a 2017 sixth-round selection and QB Brock Osweiler to Cleveland in exchange for a 2017 fourth-round selection.)
2	36	Indianapolis Colts	Shaquille Leonard ^{†}	LB	South Carolina State	2018 NFL Defensive Rookie of the Year
2	37	Indianapolis Colts	Braden Smith	G	Auburn	from NY Jets (Note: No. 37: NY Jets → Indianapolis (PD). See Round 1: Indianapolis → NY Jets.)
2	38	Tampa Bay Buccaneers	Ronald Jones II	RB	USC	
2	39	Chicago Bears	James Daniels	C	Iowa	
2	40	Denver Broncos	Courtland Sutton ^{†}	WR	SMU	
2	41	Tennessee Titans	Harold Landry ^{†}	LB	Boston College	from Oakland (Note: No. 41: Oakland → Tennessee (D). Oakland traded a second-round selection (41st overall) to Tennessee in exchange for second- and third-round selections (57th and 89th overall).)
2	42	Miami Dolphins	Mike Gesicki	TE	Penn State	
2	43	Detroit Lions	Kerryon Johnson	RB	Auburn	from San Francisco via New England (Note: No. 43: San Francisco → New England → Detroit. Multiple trades: San Francisco → New England (PD). San Francisco traded a second-round selection (43rd overall) to New England in exchange for QB Jimmy Garoppolo. New England → Detroit (D). New England traded a second-round selection (43rd overall) to Detroit in exchange for second- and fourth-round selections (51st and 117th overall))
2	44	San Francisco 49ers	Dante Pettis	WR	Washington	from Washington (Note: No. 44: Washington → San Francisco (D). Washington traded second- and fifth-round selections (44th and 142nd overall) to San Francisco in exchange for second- and third-round selections (59th and 74th overall).)
2	45	Green Bay Packers	Josh Jackson	CB	Iowa	
2	46	Kansas City Chiefs	Breeland Speaks	DE	Ole Miss	from Cincinnati (Note: No. 46: Cincinnati → Kansas City (D). Cincinnati traded second- and third-round selections (46th and 100th overall) to Kansas City in exchange for second- and third-round selections (54th and 78th overall).)
2	47	Arizona Cardinals	Christian Kirk	WR	Texas A&M	
2	48	Los Angeles Chargers	Uchenna Nwosu	LB	USC	
2	49	Philadelphia Eagles	Dallas Goedert	TE	South Dakota State	from Seattle via NY Jets and Indianapolis (Note: No. 49: Seattle → NY Jets → Indianapolis → Philadelphia. Multiple trades: Seattle → NY Jets (PD). Seattle traded second- and seventh-round selections (49th and 235th overall), as well as WR Jermaine Kearse to the NY Jets in exchange for a seventh-round selection (226th overall) and DT Sheldon Richardson. NY Jets → Indianapolis (PD). See Round 1: Indianapolis → NY Jets. Indianapolis → Philadelphia (D). Indianapolis traded a second-round selection (49th overall) to Philadelphia in exchange for second- and fifth-round selections (52nd and 169th overall).)
2	50	Dallas Cowboys	Connor Williams	G	Texas	
2	51	Chicago Bears	Anthony Miller	WR	Memphis	from Detroit via New England (Note: No. 51: Detroit → New England → Chicago. Multiple trades: Detroit → New England (D). See Round 2: New England → Detroit. New England → Chicago (D). New England traded a second-round selection (51st overall) to Chicago in exchange for a fourth-round selection (105th overall) and a 2019 second-round selection.)
2	52	Indianapolis Colts	Kemoko Turay	DE	Rutgers	from Baltimore via Philadelphia (Note: No. 52: Baltimore → Philadelphia → Indianapolis. Multiple trades: Baltimore → Philadelphia (D). See Round 1: Philadelphia → Baltimore. Philadelphia → Indianapolis (D). See Round 2: Indianapolis → Philadelphia.)
2	53	Tampa Bay Buccaneers	M. J. Stewart	CB	North Carolina	from Buffalo (Note: No. 53: Buffalo → Tampa Bay (D). See Round 1: Tampa Bay → Buffalo.)
2	54	Cincinnati Bengals	Jessie Bates ^{†}	S	Wake Forest	from Kansas City (Note: No. 54: Kansas City → Cincinnati (D). See Round 2: Cincinnati → Kansas City.)
2	55	Carolina Panthers	Donte Jackson	CB	LSU	
2	56	New England Patriots	Duke Dawson	CB	Florida	from LA Rams via Buffalo and Tampa Bay (Note: No. 56: LA Rams → Buffalo → Tampa Bay → New England. Multiple trades: LA Rams → Buffalo (PD). The LA Rams traded a second-round selection (56th overall) and CB E. J. Gaines to Buffalo in exchange for a sixth-round selection (195th overall) and WR Sammy Watkins. Buffalo → Tampa Bay (D). See Round 1: Tampa Bay → Buffalo. Tampa Bay → New England (D). Tampa Bay traded a second-round selection (56th overall) to New England in exchange for second- and fourth-round selections (63rd and 117th overall).)
2	57	Oakland Raiders	P. J. Hall	DT	Sam Houston State	from Tennessee (Note: No. 57: Tennessee → Oakland (D). See Round 2: Oakland → Tennessee.)
2	58	Atlanta Falcons	Isaiah Oliver	CB	Colorado	
2	59	Washington Redskins	Derrius Guice	RB	LSU	from New Orleans via San Francisco (Note: No. 59: New Orleans → San Francisco → Washington. Multiple trades: New Orleans → San Francisco (PD). New Orleans traded a second-round selection (59th overall) and a 2017 seventh-round selection to San Francisco in exchange for a 2017 third-round selection. San Francisco → Washington (PD). See Round 2: Washington → San Francisco.)
2	60	Pittsburgh Steelers	James Washington	WR	Oklahoma State	2017 Fred Biletnikoff Award winner
2	61	Jacksonville Jaguars	D. J. Chark ^{†}	WR	LSU	
2	62	Minnesota Vikings	Brian O'Neill ^{†}	T	Pittsburgh	
2	63	Tampa Bay Buccaneers	Carlton Davis	CB	Auburn	from New England (Note: No. 63: New England → Tampa Bay (D). See Round 2: Tampa Bay → New England.)
2	64	Indianapolis Colts	Tyquan Lewis	DE	Ohio State	from Philadelphia via Cleveland (Note: No. 64: Philadelphia → Cleveland → Indianapolis. Multiple trades: Philadelphia → Cleveland (PD). Philadelphia traded a second-round selection (64th overall), 2016 first-, third- and fourth-round selections, and a 2017 first-round selection to Cleveland in exchange for a 2016 first-round selection and a 2017 fourth-round selection. Cleveland → Indianapolis (D). Cleveland traded a second-round selection (64th overall) to Indianapolis in exchange for third- and sixth-round selections (67th and 178th overall).)
3	65	Oakland Raiders	Brandon Parker	T	North Carolina A&T	from Cleveland via Buffalo and Baltimore (Note: No. 65: Cleveland → Buffalo → Baltimore → Oakland. Multiple trades: Cleveland → Buffalo (PD). Cleveland traded a third-round selection (65th overall) to Buffalo in exchange for QB Tyrod Taylor. Buffalo → Baltimore (D). See Round 1: Baltimore → Buffalo. Baltimore → Oakland (D). Baltimore traded this third-round selection (65th overall) to Oakland in exchange for third-, fifth- and sixth-round selections (75th, 152nd and 212th overall).)
3	66	New York Giants	Lorenzo Carter	LB	Georgia	
3	67	Cleveland Browns	Chad Thomas	DE	Miami (FL)	from Indianapolis (Note: No. 67: Indianapolis → Cleveland (D). See Round 2: Cleveland → Indianapolis.)
3	68	Houston Texans	Justin Reid	S	Stanford	
3	69	New York Giants	B. J. Hill	DT	NC State	from Tampa Bay (Note: No. 69: Tampa Bay → NY Giants (PD). Tampa Bay traded third- and fourth-round selections (69th and 108th overall) to the NY Giants in exchange for a fourth-round selection (102nd overall) and DE Jason Pierre-Paul.)
3	70	San Francisco 49ers	Fred Warner ^{†}	LB	BYU	from Chicago (Note: No. 70: Chicago → San Francisco (PD). Chicago traded a third-round selection (70th overall), and 2017 first-, third- and fourth-round selections to San Francisco in exchange for a 2017 first-round selection.)
3	71	Denver Broncos	Royce Freeman	RB	Oregon	
3	72	New York Jets	Nathan Shepherd	DT	Fort Hays State	
3	73	Miami Dolphins	Jerome Baker	LB	Ohio State	
3	74	Washington Redskins	Geron Christian	T	Louisville	from San Francisco (Note: No. 74: San Francisco → Washington (PD). See Round 2: Washington → San Francisco.)
3	75	Kansas City Chiefs	Derrick Nnadi	DT	Florida State	from Oakland via Baltimore (Note: No. 75: Oakland → Baltimore → Kansas City. Multiple trades: Oakland → Baltimore (D). See Round 3: Baltimore → Oakland. Baltimore → Kansas City (D). Baltimore traded a third-round selection (75th overall) to Kansas City in exchange for third- and fourth-round selections (86th and 122nd overall).)
3	76	Pittsburgh Steelers	Mason Rudolph	QB	Oklahoma State	from Green Bay via Seattle (Note: No. 76: Green Bay → Seattle → Pittsburgh. Multiple trades: Green Bay → Seattle (D). See Round 1: Seattle → Green Bay. Seattle → Pittsburgh (D). Seattle traded this third-round selection (76th overall) to Pittsburgh in exchange for third- and seventh-round selections (79th and 220th overall).)
3	77	Cincinnati Bengals	Sam Hubbard	DE	Ohio State	
3	78	Cincinnati Bengals	Malik Jefferson	LB	Texas	from Washington via Kansas City (Note: No. 78: Washington → Kansas City → Cincinnati. Multiple trades: Washington → Kansas City (PD). Washington traded a third-round selection (78th overall) and CB Kendall Fuller to Kansas City in exchange for QB Alex Smith. Kansas City → Cincinnati (D). See Round 2: Cincinnati → Kansas City.)
3	79	Seattle Seahawks	Rasheem Green	DE	USC	from Arizona via Oakland and Pittsburgh (Note: No. 79: Arizona → Oakland → Pittsburgh → Seattle. Multiple trades: Arizona → Oakland (D). See Round 1: Oakland → Arizona. Oakland → Pittsburgh (D). Oakland traded a third-round selection (79th overall) to Pittsburgh in exchange for WR Martavis Bryant. Pittsburgh → Seattle (D). See Round 3: Seattle → Pittsburgh.)
3	80	Houston Texans	Martinas Rankin	T	Mississippi State	from Seattle (Note: No. 80: Seattle → Houston (PD). Seattle traded a third-round selection (80th overall) and a 2019 second-round selection to Houston in exchange for a fifth-round selection (141st overall) and OT Duane Brown. The trade originally included CB Jeremy Lane but was revised after Lane failed his physical.)
3	81	Dallas Cowboys	Michael Gallup	WR	Colorado State	
3	82	Detroit Lions	Tracy Walker	S	Louisiana	
3	83	Baltimore Ravens	Orlando Brown Jr.	T	Oklahoma	
3	84	Los Angeles Chargers	Justin Jones	DT	NC State	
3	85	Carolina Panthers	Rashaan Gaulden	CB	Tennessee	from Buffalo (Note: No. 85: Buffalo → Carolina (PD). Buffalo traded a third-round selection (85th overall) and a 2018 seventh-round selection to Carolina in exchange for WR Kelvin Benjamin.)
3	86	Baltimore Ravens	Mark Andrews ^{†}	TE	Oklahoma	from Kansas City (Note: No. 86: Kansas City → Baltimore (D). See Round 3: Baltimore → Kansas City.)
3	87	Oakland Raiders	Arden Key	DE	LSU	from LA Rams (Note: No. 87: LA Rams → Oakland (D). The LA Rams traded a third-round selection (87th overall) to Oakland in exchange for third- and seventh-round selections (89th and 217th overall).)
3	88	Green Bay Packers	Oren Burks	LB	Vanderbilt	from Carolina (Note: No. 88: Carolina → Green Bay (D). Carolina traded a third-round selection (88th overall) to Green Bay in exchange for fourth- and fifth-round selections (101st and 147th overall).)
3	89	Los Angeles Rams	Joseph Noteboom	T	TCU	from Tennessee via Oakland (Note: No. 89: Tennessee → Oakland → LA Rams. Multiple trades: Tennessee → Oakland (D). See Round 2: Oakland → Tennessee. Oakland → LA Rams (D). See Round 3: LA Rams → Oakland.)
3	90	Atlanta Falcons	Deadrin Senat	DT	South Florida	
3	91	New Orleans Saints	Tre'Quan Smith	WR	UCF	
3	92	Pittsburgh Steelers	Chukwuma Okorafor	T	Western Michigan	
3	93	Jacksonville Jaguars	Ronnie Harrison	S	Alabama	
3	94	Tampa Bay Buccaneers	Alex Cappa	T	Humboldt State	from Minnesota (Note: No. 94: Minnesota → Tampa Bay (D). Minnesota traded a third-round selection (94th overall) to Tampa Bay in exchange for fourth- and sixth-round selections (102nd and 180th overall).)
3	95	San Francisco 49ers	Tarvarius Moore	S	Southern Miss	from New England (Note: No. 95: New England → San Francisco (D). New England traded a third-round selection (95th overall) to San Francisco in exchange for a fifth-round selection (143rd overall) and OT Trent Brown.)
3	96	Buffalo Bills	Harrison Phillips	DT	Stanford	from Philadelphia (Note: No. 96: Philadelphia → Buffalo (PD). Philadelphia traded a third-round selection (96th overall) and WR Jordan Matthews to Buffalo in exchange for CB Ronald Darby.)
3*	97	Arizona Cardinals	Mason Cole	C	Michigan	
3*	98	Houston Texans	Jordan Akins	TE	UCF	
3*	99	Denver Broncos	Isaac Yiadom	CB	Boston College	
3*	100	Kansas City Chiefs	Dorian O'Daniel	LB	Clemson	from Cincinnati (Note: No. 100: Cincinnati → Kansas City (D). See Round 2: Cincinnati → Kansas City.)
4	101	Carolina Panthers	Ian Thomas	TE	Indiana	from Cleveland via Green Bay (Note: No. 101: Cleveland → Green Bay → Carolina. Multiple trades: Cleveland → Green Bay (PD). Cleveland traded fourth- and fifth-round selections (101st and 138th overall), and QB DeShone Kizer to Green Bay in exchange for fourth- and fifth-round selections (114th and 150th overall), and CB Damarious Randall. Green Bay → Carolina (D). See Round 3: Carolina → Green Bay.)
4	102	Minnesota Vikings	Jalyn Holmes	DE	Ohio State	from NY Giants via Tampa Bay (Note: No. 102: NY Giants → Tampa Bay → Minnesota. Multiple trades: NY Giants → Tampa Bay (PD). See Round 3: Tampa Bay → NY Giants. Tampa Bay → Minnesota (D). See Round 3: Minnesota → Tampa Bay.)
4	103	Houston Texans	Keke Coutee	WR	Texas Tech	
4	104	Indianapolis Colts	Nyheim Hines	RB	NC State	
4	105	Cleveland Browns	Antonio Callaway	WR	Florida	from Chicago via New England (Note: No. 105: Chicago → New England → Cleveland. Multiple trades: Chicago → New England (D). See Round 2: New England → Chicago. New England → Cleveland (D). New England traded a fourth-round selection (105th overall) to Cleveland in exchange for fourth- and sixth-round selections (114th and 178th overall).)
4	106	Denver Broncos	Josey Jewell	LB	Iowa	
4	107	New York Jets	Chris Herndon	TE	Miami (FL)	
4	108	New York Giants	Kyle Lauletta	QB	Richmond	from Tampa Bay (Note: No. 108: Tampa Bay → NY Giants (PD). See Round 3: Tampa Bay → NY Giants.)
4	109	Washington Redskins	Troy Apke	S	Penn State	from San Francisco via Denver (Note: No. 109: San Francisco → Denver → Washington. Multiple trades: San Francisco → Denver (PD). San Francisco traded a fourth-round selection (109th overall) to Denver in exchange for a 2017 fifth-round selection and RB Kapri Bibbs. Denver → Washington (PD). Denver traded a fourth-round selection and two fifth-round selections (109th, 142nd and 163rd overall) to Washington in exchange for fourth- and fifth-round selections (113th and 149th overall), and S Su'a Cravens.)
4	110	Oakland Raiders	Nick Nelson	CB	Wisconsin	
4	111	Los Angeles Rams	Brian Allen	C	Michigan State	From Miami (Note: No. 111: Miami → LA Rams (PD). Miami traded fourth- and sixth-round selections (111th and 183rd overall) to the LA Rams in exchange for a sixth-round selection (209th overall) and DE Robert Quinn.)
4	112	Cincinnati Bengals	Mark Walton	RB	Miami (FL)	
4	113	Denver Broncos	DaeSean Hamilton	WR	Penn State	from Washington (Note: No. 113: Washington → Denver (PD). See Round 4: Denver → Washington.)
4	114	Detroit Lions	Da'Shawn Hand	DE	Alabama	from Green Bay via Cleveland and New England (Note: No. 114: Green Bay → Cleveland → New England → Detroit. Multiple trades: Green Bay → Cleveland (PD). see No. 101: Cleveland → Green Bay. Cleveland → New England (D). see No. 105: New England → Cleveland. New England → Detroit (D). New England traded a fourth-round selection (114th overall) to Detroit in exchange for a 2019 third-round selection.)
4	115	Chicago Bears	Joel Iyiegbuniwe	LB	Western Kentucky	from Arizona (Note: No. 115: Arizona → Chicago (PD). Arizona traded a fourth-round selection (115th overall), and 2017 second-, fourth- and sixth-round selections to Chicago in exchange for a 2017 second-round selection.)
4	116	Dallas Cowboys	Dorance Armstrong	DE	Kansas	
4	117	Tampa Bay Buccaneers	Jordan Whitehead	S	Pittsburgh	from Detroit via New England (Note: No. 117: Detroit → New England → Tampa Bay. Multiple trades: Detroit → New England (D). See Round 2: New England → Detroit. New England → Tampa Bay (D). See Round 2: Tampa Bay → New England.)
4	118	Baltimore Ravens	Anthony Averett	CB	Alabama	
4	119	Los Angeles Chargers	Kyzir White	S	West Virginia	
4	120	Seattle Seahawks	Will Dissly	TE	Washington	
4	121	Buffalo Bills	Taron Johnson	CB	Weber State	
4	122	Baltimore Ravens	Kenny Young	LB	UCLA	from Kansas City (Note: No. 122: Kansas City → Baltimore (D). See Round 3: Baltimore → Kansas City.)
4	123	Miami Dolphins	Durham Smythe	TE	Notre Dame	from Carolina via Cleveland (Note: No. 123: Carolina → Cleveland → Miami. Multiple trades: Carolina → Cleveland (PD). Carolina traded a fourth-round selection (123rd overall) and P Kasey Redfern to Cleveland in exchange for a 2017 seventh-round selection and P Andy Lee. Cleveland → Miami (PD). Cleveland traded this fourth-round selection to Miami in exchange for WR Jarvis Landry.)
4	124	Kansas City Chiefs	Armani Watts	S	Texas A&M	from LA Rams (Note: No. 124: LA Rams → Kansas City (PD). The LA Rams traded a fourth-round selection (124th overall) and a 2019 second-round selection to Kansas City in exchange for a sixth-round selection (209th overall) and CB Marcus Peters.)
4	125	Philadelphia Eagles	Avonte Maddox	CB	Pittsburgh	from Tennessee via Baltimore (Note: No. 125: Tennessee → Baltimore → Philadelphia. Multiple trades: Tennessee → Baltimore (D). See Round 1: Baltimore → Tennessee. Baltimore → Philadelphia (D). See Round 1: Philadelphia → Baltimore.)
4	126	Atlanta Falcons	Ito Smith	RB	Southern Miss	
4	127	New Orleans Saints	Rick Leonard	T	Florida State	
4	128	San Francisco 49ers	Kentavius Street	DE	NC State	from Pittsburgh (Note: No. 128: Pittsburgh → San Francisco (PD). Pittsburgh traded a fourth-round selection (128th overall) to San Francisco in exchange for a fifth-round selection (148th overall) and TE Vance McDonald.)
4	129	Jacksonville Jaguars	Will Richardson	T	NC State	
4	130	Philadelphia Eagles	Josh Sweat ^{†}	DE	Florida State	from Minnesota (Note: No. 130: Minnesota → Philadelphia (PD). Minnesota traded a fourth-round selection (130th overall) as well as a first-round selection in 2017 to Philadelphia in exchange for QB Sam Bradford.)
4	131	Miami Dolphins	Kalen Ballage	RB	Arizona State	from New England via Philadelphia (Note: No. 131: New England → Philadelphia → Miami. Multiple trades: New England → Philadelphia (PD). New England traded a fourth-round selection to Philadelphia in exchange for CB Eric Rowe. The fourth-round selection would have become a third-round selection if Rowe had played more than 50 percent of defensive snaps in 2016 or 2017, but he did not. Philadelphia → Miami (PD). Philadelphia traded this fourth-round selection to Miami in exchange for RB Jay Ajayi. (Note: Gowton, Brandon Lee (October 31, 2017). "Jay Ajayi Trade: Eagles acquire Dolphins running back in exchange for draft pick". Bleeding Green Nation. SB Nation. Archived from the original on October 31, 2017. https://twitter.com/RapSheet/status/925355940462907392 Archived April 9, 2023, at the Wayback Machine))
4	132	Baltimore Ravens	Jaleel Scott	WR	New Mexico State	from Philadelphia (Note: No. 132: Philadelphia → Baltimore (D). See Round 1: Philadelphia → Baltimore.)
4*	133	Green Bay Packers	J'Mon Moore	WR	Missouri	
4*	134	Arizona Cardinals	Chase Edmonds	RB	Fordham	
4*	135	Los Angeles Rams	John Franklin-Myers	DE	Stephen F. Austin	from NY Giants (Note: No. 135: NY Giants → LA Rams (PD). The NY Giants traded fourth- and sixth-round selections (135th and 176th overall) to the LA Rams in exchange for a 2019 seventh-round selection and LB Alec Ogletree.)
4*	136	Carolina Panthers	Marquis Haynes	DE	Ole Miss	from New England via LA Rams (Note: No. 136: New England → LA Rams → Carolina. Multiple trades: New England → LA Rams (PD). See Round 1: LA Rams → New England. LA Rams → Carolina (D). The LA Rams traded a fourth-round selection (136th overall) to Carolina in exchange for fifth- and sixth-round selections (147th and 197th overall).)
4*	137	Dallas Cowboys	Dalton Schultz	TE	Stanford	
5	138	Green Bay Packers	Cole Madison	G	Washington State	from Cleveland (Note: No. 138: Cleveland → Green Bay (PD). see No. 101: Cleveland → Green Bay.)
5	139	New York Giants	R. J. McIntosh	DT	Miami (FL)	
5	140	Oakland Raiders	Maurice Hurst II	DT	Michigan	from Indianapolis (Note: No. 140: Indianapolis → Oakland (D). Indianapolis traded a fifth-round selection (140th overall) to Oakland in exchange for fifth- and sixth-round selections (159th and 185th overall).)
5	141	Seattle Seahawks	Shaquem Griffin	LB	UCF	from Houston (Note: No. 141: Houston → Seattle (PD). See Round 3: Seattle → Houston.)
5	142	San Francisco 49ers	D. J. Reed	CB	Kansas State	from Denver via Washington (Note: No. 142: Denver → Washington → San Francisco. Multiple trades: Denver → Washington (PD). See Round 4: Denver → Washington. Washington → San Francisco (PD). See Round 2: Washington → San Francisco.)
5	143	New England Patriots	Ja'Whaun Bentley	LB	Purdue	from San Francisco via NY Jets (Note: No. 143: San Francisco → NY Jets → New England. Multiple trades: NY Jets → San Francisco (PD). The NY Jets traded a fifth-round selection (143rd overall) to San Francisco in exchange for CB Rashard Robinson. San Francisco → New England (D). See Round 3: New England → San Francisco.)
5	144	Tampa Bay Buccaneers	Justin Watson	WR	Penn	
5	145	Chicago Bears	Bilal Nichols	DT	Delaware	
5	146	Seattle Seahawks	Tre Flowers	S	Oklahoma State	from Oakland (Note: No. 146: Oakland → Seattle (PD). Oakland traded a fifth-round selection (146th overall) to Seattle in exchange for a sixth-round selection (192nd overall) and RB Marshawn Lynch.)
5	147	Los Angeles Rams	Micah Kiser	LB	Virginia	from Miami via New Orleans and Green Bay (Note: No. 147: Miami → New Orleans → Green Bay → LA Rams. Multiple trades: Miami → New Orleans (PD). Miami traded a fifth-round selection (147th overall) to New Orleans in exchange for LB Stephone Anthony. New Orleans → Green Bay (D). See Round 1: Green Bay → New Orleans. Green Bay → Carolina (D). See Round 3: Carolina → Green Bay. Carolina → LA Rams (D). See Round 4: LA Rams → Carolina.)
5	148	Pittsburgh Steelers	Marcus Allen	S	Penn State	from San Francisco (Note: No. 148: San Francisco → Pittsburgh (PD). See Round 4: Pittsburgh → San Francisco.)
5	149	Seattle Seahawks	Michael Dickson ^{†}	P	Texas	from Washington via Denver (Note: No. 149: Washington → Denver → Seattle. Multiple trades: Washington → Denver (PD). See Round 4: Denver → Washington. Denver → Seattle (D). Denver traded a fifth-round selection (149th overall) to Seattle in exchange for fifth- and seventh-round selections (156th and 226th overall).)
5	150	Cleveland Browns	Genard Avery	LB	Memphis	from Green Bay (Note: No. 150: Green Bay → Cleveland (PD). see No. 101: Cleveland → Green Bay.)
5	151	Cincinnati Bengals	Davontae Harris	CB	Illinois State	
5	152	Tennessee Titans	Dane Cruikshank	CB	Arizona	from Arizona via Oakland and Baltimore (Note: No. 152: Arizona → Oakland → Baltimore → Tennessee. Multiple trades: Arizona → Oakland (D). See Round 1: Oakland → Arizona. Oakland → Baltimore (D). See Round 3: Baltimore → Oakland. Baltimore → Tennessee (D). Baltimore traded a fifth-round selection (152nd overall) to Tennessee in exchange for fifth- and sixth-round selections (162nd and 215th overall))
5	153	Detroit Lions	Tyrell Crosby	T	Oregon	
5	154	Buffalo Bills	Siran Neal	CB	Jacksonville State	from Baltimore (Note: No. 154: Baltimore → Buffalo (D). See Round 1: Baltimore → Buffalo.)
5	155	Los Angeles Chargers	Scott Quessenberry	C	UCLA	
5	156	Denver Broncos	Troy Fumagalli	TE	Wisconsin	from Seattle via Philadelphia and Seattle (Note: No. 156: Seattle → Philadelphia → Seattle → Denver. Multiple trades: Seattle → Philadelphia (PD) Seattle traded a fifth-round selection (156th overall) to Philadelphia in exchange for a seventh-round selection (250th overall) and OT Matt Tobin. Philadelphia → Seattle (PD) Philadelphia traded a fifth-round selection (156th overall) and WR Marcus Johnson to Seattle in exchange for a seventh-round selection (250th overall) and DE Michael Bennett. Seattle → Denver (D). See Round 5: Denver → Seattle.)
5	157	Minnesota Vikings	Tyler Conklin	TE	Central Michigan	from Dallas via NY Jets (Note: No. 157: Dallas → NY Jets → Minnesota. Multiple trades: Dallas → NY Jets (PD). Dallas traded a fifth-round selection (157th overall) to the NY Jets in exchange for a 2017 sixth-round selection. NY Jets → Minnesota (D). The NY Jets traded a fifth-round selection (157th overall) to Minnesota in exchange for fifth- and seventh-round selections (167th and 225th overall).)
5	158	Cincinnati Bengals	Andrew Brown	DE	Virginia	from Buffalo (Note: No. 158: Buffalo → Cincinnati (PD). See Round 1: Cincinnati → Buffalo.)
5	159	Indianapolis Colts	Daurice Fountain	WR	Northern Iowa	from Kansas City via Cleveland, New England and Oakland (Note: No. 159: Kansas City → Cleveland → New England → Oakland → Indianapolis. Multiple trades: Kansas City → Cleveland (PD). Kansas City traded a fifth-round selection (159th overall) to Cleveland in exchange for OT Cameron Erving. Cleveland → New England (PD). Cleveland traded a fifth-round selection (159th overall) and DT Danny Shelton to New England in exchange for a 2019 third-round selection. New England → Oakland (PD). New England traded a fifth-round selection (159th overall) to Oakland in exchange for a sixth-round selection (210th overall) and WR Cordarrelle Patterson. Oakland → Indianapolis (D). See Round 5: Indianapolis → Oakland.)
5	160	Los Angeles Rams	Ogbonnia Okoronkwo	LB	Oklahoma	from LA Rams via Denver (Note: No. 160: LA Rams → Denver → LA Rams. Multiple trades: LA Rams → Denver (PD). The LA Rams traded a fifth-round selection (160th overall) to Denver in exchange for CB Aqib Talib. Denver → LA Rams (D). Denver traded a fifth-round selection (160th overall) to the LA Rams in exchange for two sixth-round selections (183rd and 217th overall).)
5	161	Carolina Panthers	Jermaine Carter	LB	Maryland	
5	162	Baltimore Ravens	Jordan Lasley	WR	UCLA	from Tennessee (Note: No. 162: Tennessee → Baltimore (D). See Round 5: Baltimore → Tennessee.)
5	163	Washington Redskins	Tim Settle	DT	Virginia Tech	from Atlanta via Denver (Note: No. 163: Atlanta → Denver → Washington. Multiple trades: Atlanta → Denver (PD). Atlanta traded a fifth-round selection (163rd overall) to Denver in exchange for OT Ty Sambrailo. Denver → Washington (PD). See Round 4: Denver → Washington.)
5	164	New Orleans Saints	Natrell Jamerson	S	Wisconsin	
5	165	Pittsburgh Steelers	Jaylen Samuels	RB	NC State	
5	166	Buffalo Bills	Wyatt Teller ^{†}	G	Virginia Tech	from Jacksonville (Note: No. 166: Jacksonville → Buffalo (PD) Jacksonville traded a conditional fifth-round selection (166th overall) to Buffalo in exchange for DT Marcell Dareus. This pick was upgraded from a sixth-round selection after Dareus remained on Jacksonville's roster for the remainder of the 2017 season and the Jaguars made the playoffs.)
5	167	Minnesota Vikings	Daniel Carlson	K	Auburn	from Minnesota via NY Jets (Note: No. 167: Minnesota → NY Jets → Minnesota. Multiple trades: Minnesota → NY Jets (D). See Round 5: NY Jets → Minnesota. NY Jets → Minnesota (D) The NY Jets traded fifth- and seventh-round selections (167th and 225th overall) to Minnesota in exchange for two sixth-round selections (180th and 204th overall).)
5	168	Seattle Seahawks	Jamarco Jones	T	Ohio State	from New England (Note: No. 168: New England → Seattle (PD). New England traded fifth- and seventh-round selections (168th and 250th overall) to Seattle in exchange for DE Cassius Marsh.)
5	169	Indianapolis Colts	Jordan Wilkins	RB	Ole Miss	from Philadelphia (Note: No. 169: Philadelphia → Indianapolis (D). See Round 2: Indianapolis → Philadelphia.)
5*	170	Cincinnati Bengals	Darius Phillips	CB	Western Michigan	
5*	171	Dallas Cowboys	Mike White	QB	Western Kentucky	
5*	172	Green Bay Packers	J. K. Scott	P	Alabama	
5*	173	Oakland Raiders	Johnny Townsend	P	Florida	from Dallas (Note: No. 173: Dallas → Oakland (PD). Dallas traded a fifth-round selection (173rd overall) to Oakland in exchange for a sixth-round selection (192nd overall) and RB Jamize Olawale.)
5*	174	Green Bay Packers	Marquez Valdes-Scantling	WR	South Florida	
6	175	Cleveland Browns	Damion Ratley	WR	Texas A&M	
6	176	Los Angeles Rams	John Kelly	RB	Tennessee	from NY Giants (Note: No. 176: NY Giants → LA Rams (PD). See Round 4: NY Giants → LA Rams.)
6	177	Houston Texans	Duke Ejiofor	DE	Wake Forest	
6	178	New England Patriots	Christian Sam	LB	Arizona State	from Indianapolis via Cleveland (Note: No. 178: Indianapolis → Cleveland → New England. Multiple trades: Indianapolis → Cleveland (D). See Round 2: Cleveland → Indianapolis. Cleveland → New England (D). See Round 4: New England → Cleveland.)
6	179	New York Jets	Parry Nickerson	CB	Tulane	
6	180	New York Jets	Folorunso Fatukasi	DT	UConn	from Tampa Bay via Minnesota (Note: No. 180: Tampa Bay → Minnesota → NY Jets. Multiple trades: Tampa Bay → Minnesota (D). See Round 3: Minnesota → Tampa Bay. Minnesota → NY Jets (D). See Round 5: NY Jets → Minnesota.)
6	181	Chicago Bears	Kylie Fitts	DE	Utah	
6	182	Arizona Cardinals	Chris Campbell	CB	Penn State	from Denver (Note: No. 182: Denver → Arizona (PD). Denver traded a sixth-round selection (182nd overall) to Arizona in exchange for OT Jared Veldheer.)
6	183	Denver Broncos	Sam Jones	G	Arizona State	from Miami via LA Rams (Note: No. 183: Miami → LA Rams → Denver. Multiple trades: Miami → LA Rams (PD). See Round 4: Miami → LA Rams. LA Rams → Denver (D). See Round 5: Denver → LA Rams.)
6	184	San Francisco 49ers	Marcell Harris	S	Florida	
6	185	Indianapolis Colts	Deon Cain	WR	Clemson	from Oakland (Note: No. 185: Oakland → Indianapolis (D). See Round 5: Indianapolis → Oakland.)
6	186	Seattle Seahawks	Jacob Martin	LB	Temple	from Green Bay (Note: No. 186: Green Bay → Seattle (D). See Round 1: Seattle → Green Bay.)
6	187	Buffalo Bills	Ray-Ray McCloud	WR	Clemson	from Cincinnati (Note: No. 187: Cincinnati → Buffalo (PD). See Round 1: Cincinnati → Buffalo.)
6	188	Cleveland Browns	Simeon Thomas	CB	Louisiana	from Washington (Note: No. 188: Washington → Cleveland (PD). Washington traded a sixth-round selection (188th overall) to Cleveland in exchange for a sixth-round selection (205th overall) and QB Kevin Hogan.)
6	189	New Orleans Saints	Kamrin Moore	CB	Boston College	from Arizona (Note: No. 189: Arizona → New Orleans (PD). Arizona traded a sixth-round selection (189th overall) to New Orleans in exchange for RB Adrian Peterson.)
6	190	Baltimore Ravens	DeShon Elliott	S	Texas	
6	191	Los Angeles Chargers	Dylan Cantrell	WR	Texas Tech	
6	192	Los Angeles Rams	Jamil Demby	T	Maine	from Seattle via Oakland and Dallas (Note: No. 192: Seattle → Oakland → Dallas → LA Rams. Multiple trades: Seattle → Oakland (PD). See Round 5: Oakland → Seattle. Oakland → Dallas (PD). See Round 5: Dallas → Oakland. Dallas → LA Rams (D). Dallas traded a sixth-round selection (192nd overall) to the LA Rams in exchange for WR Tavon Austin.)
6	193	Dallas Cowboys	Chris Covington	LB	Indiana	
6	194	Atlanta Falcons	Russell Gage	WR	LSU	from Detroit via LA Rams (Note: No. 194: Detroit → LA Rams → Atlanta. Multiple trades: Detroit → LA Rams (PD). Detroit traded a sixth-round selection (194th overall) to the LA Rams in exchange for OT Greg Robinson. LA Rams → Atlanta (D). The LA Rams traded a sixth-round selection (194th overall) to Atlanta in exchange for two seventh-round selections (244th and 256th.))
6	195	Los Angeles Rams	Sebastian Joseph-Day	DT	Rutgers	from Buffalo (Note: No. 195: Buffalo → LA Rams (PD). See Round 2: LA Rams → Buffalo.)
6	196	Kansas City Chiefs	Tremon Smith	CB	Central Arkansas	
6	197	Washington Redskins	Shaun Dion Hamilton	LB	Alabama	from Carolina via LA Rams (Note: No. 197: Carolina → LA Rams → Washington. Multiple trades: Carolina → LA Rams (D). See Round 4: LA Rams → Carolina. LA Rams → Washington (D). The LA Rams traded sixth- and seventh-round selections (197th and 256th overall) to Washington in exchange for sixth- and seventh-round selections (205th and 231st overall).)
6	198	Kansas City Chiefs	Kahlil McKenzie	DT	Tennessee	from LA Rams via New England (Note: No. 198: LA Rams → New England → Kansas City. Multiple trades: LA Rams → New England (PD). See Round 1: LA Rams → New England. New England → Kansas City (D). New England traded a sixth-round selection (198th overall) to Kansas City in exchange for two seventh-round selections (233rd and 243rd overall).)
6	199	Tennessee Titans	Luke Falk	QB	Washington State	
6	200	Atlanta Falcons	Foyesade Oluokun	S	Yale	
6	201	New Orleans Saints	Boston Scott	RB	Louisiana Tech	
6	202	Tampa Bay Buccaneers	Jack Cichy	LB	Wisconsin	from Pittsburgh via Cleveland and Pittsburgh (Note: No. 202: Pittsburgh → Cleveland → Tampa Bay. Multiple trades: Pittsburgh → Cleveland (PD). Pittsburgh traded a sixth-round selection (202nd overall) to Cleveland in exchange for CB Justin Gilbert. Cleveland → Pittsburgh (PD). Cleveland traded a sixth-round selection (202nd overall) to Pittsburgh in exchange for a 2019 seventh-round selection and WR Sammie Coates. Pittsburgh → Tampa Bay (PD). Pittsburgh traded a sixth-round selection (202nd overall) to Tampa Bay in exchange for a 2019 seventh-round selection and S J. J. Wilcox.)
6	203	Jacksonville Jaguars	Tanner Lee	QB	Nebraska	
6	204	New York Jets	Trenton Cannon	RB	Virginia State	from Minnesota (Note: No. 204: Minnesota → NY Jets (D). See Round 5: NY Jets → Minnesota.)
6	205	Los Angeles Rams	Trevon Young	DE	Louisville	from New England via Cleveland and Washington (Note: No. 205: New England → Cleveland → Washington → LA Rams. Multiple trades: New England → Cleveland (PD). New England traded a sixth-round selection (205th overall) to Cleveland in exchange for a seventh-round selection (219th overall) and CB Jason McCourty. Cleveland → Washington (PD). See Round 6: Washington → Cleveland. Washington → LA Rams (D). See Round 6: LA Rams → Washington.)
6	206	Philadelphia Eagles	Matt Pryor	T	TCU	
6*	207	Green Bay Packers	Equanimeous St. Brown	WR	Notre Dame	
6*	208	Dallas Cowboys	Cedrick Wilson Jr.	WR	Boise State	
6*	209	Miami Dolphins	Cornell Armstrong	CB	Southern Miss	from Kansas City via LA Rams (Note: No. 209: Kansas City → LA Rams → Miami. Multiple trades: Kansas City → LA Rams (PD). See Round 4: LA Rams → Kansas City. LA Rams → Miami (PD). See Round 4: Miami → LA Rams.)
6*	210	New England Patriots	Braxton Berrios	WR	Miami (FL)	from Oakland (Note: No. 210: Oakland → New England (PD). See Round 5: New England → Oakland.)
6*	211	Houston Texans	Jordan Thomas	TE	Mississippi State	
6*	212	Baltimore Ravens	Greg Senat	T	Wagner	from Oakland (Note: No. 212: Oakland → Baltimore (D). See Round 3: Baltimore → Oakland.)
6*	213	Minnesota Vikings	Colby Gossett	G	Appalachian State	
6*	214	Houston Texans	Peter Kalambayi	LB	Stanford	
6*	215	Baltimore Ravens	Bradley Bozeman	C	Alabama	from Baltimore via Tennessee (Note: No. 215: Baltimore → Tennessee → Baltimore. Multiple trades: Baltimore → Tennessee (D). See Round 1: Baltimore → Tennessee. Tennessee → Baltimore (D). See Round 5: Baltimore → Tennessee.)
6*	216	Oakland Raiders	Azeem Victor	LB	Washington	
6*	217	Denver Broncos	Keishawn Bierria	LB	Washington	from Oakland via LA Rams (Note: No. 217: Oakland → LA Rams → Denver. Multiple trades: Oakland → LA Rams (D). See Round 3: LA Rams → Oakland. LA Rams → Denver (D). See Round 5: Denver → LA Rams.)
6*	218	Minnesota Vikings	Ade Aruna	DE	Tulane	
7	219	New England Patriots	Danny Etling	QB	LSU	from Cleveland (Note: No. 219: Cleveland → New England (PD). See Round 6: New England → Cleveland.)
7	220	Seattle Seahawks	Alex McGough	QB	FIU	from NY Giants via Pittsburgh (Note: No. 220: NY Giants → Pittsburgh → Seattle. Multiple trades: NY Giants → Pittsburgh (PD). The NY Giants traded a seventh-round selection (220th overall) to Pittsburgh in exchange for CB Ross Cockrell. Pittsburgh → Seattle (D). See Round 3: Seattle → Pittsburgh.)
7	221	Indianapolis Colts	Matthew Adams	LB	Houston	
7	222	Houston Texans	Jermaine Kelly	CB	San Jose State	
7	223	San Francisco 49ers	Jullian Taylor	DT	Temple	from Tampa Bay via Miami (Note: No. 223: Tampa Bay → Miami → San Francisco. Multiple trades: Tampa Bay → Miami (PD). Tampa Bay traded a seventh-round selection (223rd overall) and a 2017 seventh-round selection to Miami in exchange for a 2017 seventh-round selection. Miami → San Francisco (PD). Miami traded a seventh-round selection (223rd overall) to San Francisco in exchange for a seventh-round selection (227th overall) and C Daniel Kilgore.)
7	224	Chicago Bears	Javon Wims	WR	Georgia	
7	225	Minnesota Vikings	Devante Downs	LB	California	from Denver via Minnesota and NY Jets (Note: No. 225: Denver → Minnesota → NY Jets → Minnesota. Multiple trades: Denver → Minnesota (PD). Denver traded a seventh-round selection (225th overall) and QB Trevor Siemian to Minnesota in exchange for a 2019 fifth-round selection. Minnesota → NY Jets (D). See Round 5: NY Jets → Minnesota. NY Jets → Minnesota (D). See Round 5: NY Jets → Minnesota.)
7	226	Denver Broncos	David Williams	RB	Arkansas	from NY Jets via Seattle (Note: No. 226: NY Jets → Seattle → Denver. Multiple trades: NY Jets → Seattle (PD). See Round 2: Seattle → NY Jets. Seattle → Denver (D). See Round 5: Denver → Seattle.)
7	227	Miami Dolphins	Quentin Poling	LB	Ohio	from San Francisco (Note: No. 227: San Francisco → Miami (PD). See Round 7: Miami → San Francisco.)
7	228	Oakland Raiders	Marcell Ateman	WR	Oklahoma State	
7	229	Miami Dolphins	Jason Sanders	K	New Mexico	
7	230	Jacksonville Jaguars	Leon Jacobs	LB	Wisconsin	from Cincinnati (Note: No. 230: Cincinnati → Jacksonville (PD). Cincinnati traded a conditional seventh-round selection (230th overall) to Jacksonville in exchange for DE Chris Smith. If Smith was not on the Bengals' active roster for at least six games during the 2017 season, the pick would have remained with Cincinnati.)
7	231	Los Angeles Rams	Travin Howard	LB	TCU	from Washington (Note: No. 231: Washington → LA Rams (D). See Round 6: LA Rams → Washington.)
7	232	Green Bay Packers	James Looney	DE	California	
7	233	Philadelphia Eagles	Jordan Mailata	T		from Arizona via Kansas City and New England (Note: No. 233: Arizona → Kansas City → New England → Philadelphia. Multiple trades: Arizona → Kansas City (PD). Arizona traded a seventh-round selection (233rd overall) to Kansas City in exchange for CB Marcus Cooper. Kansas City → New England (D). See Round 6: New England → Kansas City. New England → Philadelphia (D). New England traded a seventh-round selection (233rd overall) to Philadelphia in exchange for a seventh-round selection (250th overall) and a 2019 seventh-round selection.); Australian rugby league player drafted from South Sydney Rabbitohs of NRL
7	234	Carolina Panthers	Andre Smith	LB	North Carolina	from LA Chargers via Buffalo (Note: No. 234: LA Chargers → Buffalo → Carolina. Multiple trades: LA Chargers → Buffalo (PD). The LA Chargers traded a seventh-round selection (234th overall) to Buffalo in exchange for QB Cardale Jones. Buffalo → Carolina (PD). See Round 3: Buffalo → Carolina.)
7	235	Indianapolis Colts	Zaire Franklin ^{†}	LB	Syracuse	from Seattle via NY Jets (Note: No. 235: Seattle → NY Jets → Indianapolis. Multiple trades: Seattle → NY Jets (PD). See Round 2: Seattle → NY Jets. NY Jets → Indianapolis (D). The NY Jets traded a seventh-round selection (235th overall) to Indianapolis in exchange for DE Henry Anderson.)
7	236	Dallas Cowboys	Bo Scarbrough	RB	Alabama	
7	237	Detroit Lions	Nick Bawden	FB	San Diego State	
7	238	Baltimore Ravens	Zach Sieler	DE	Ferris State	from Arizona via Baltimore (Note: No. 238: Baltimore → Arizona (PD). Baltimore traded a seventh-round selection (238th overall) to Arizona in exchange for C Tony Bergstrom.)
7	239	Green Bay Packers	Hunter Bradley	LS	Mississippi State	from Buffalo (Note: No. 239: Buffalo → Green Bay (PD). Buffalo traded a seventh-round selection (239th overall) to Green Bay in exchange for LB Lerentee McCray.)
7	240	San Francisco 49ers	Richie James	WR	Middle Tennessee	from Kansas City (Note: No. 240: Kansas City → San Francisco (PD). Kansas City traded a seventh-round selection (240th overall) to San Francisco in exchange for CB Kenneth Acker.)
7	241	Washington Redskins	Greg Stroman	CB	Virginia Tech	from LA Rams (Note: No. 241: LA Rams → Washington (PD). The LA Rams traded a seventh-round selection (241st overall) to Washington in exchange for TE Derek Carrier.)
7	242	Carolina Panthers	Kendrick Norton	DT	Miami (FL)	
7	243	New England Patriots	Keion Crossen	CB	Western Carolina	from Tennessee via Kansas City (Note: No. 243: Tennessee → Kansas City → New England. Multiple trades: Tennessee → Kansas City (PD). Tennessee traded a seventh-round selection (243rd overall) to Kansas City in exchange for DE David King. Kansas City → New England (D). See Round 6: New England → Kansas City.)
7	244	Los Angeles Rams	Justin Lawler	DE	SMU	from Atlanta (Note: No. 244: Atlanta → LA Rams (D). See Round 6: LA Rams → Atlanta.)
7	245	New Orleans Saints	Will Clapp	C	LSU	
7	246	Pittsburgh Steelers	Joshua Frazier	DT	Alabama	
7	247	Jacksonville Jaguars	Logan Cooke ^{†}	P	Mississippi State	
7	248	Green Bay Packers	Kendall Donnerson	LB	Southeast Missouri State	from Minnesota via Seattle (Note: No. 248: Seattle → Minnesota → Green Bay. Multiple trades: Minnesota → Seattle (PD). Minnesota traded a seventh-round selection (248th overall) to Seattle in exchange for CB Tramaine Brock. Seattle → Green Bay (D). See Round 1: Seattle → Green Bay.)
7	249	Cincinnati Bengals	Logan Woodside	QB	Toledo	from New England (Note: No. 249: New England → Cincinnati (PD). New England traded a seventh-round selection (249th overall) to Cincinnati in exchange for LB Marquis Flowers.)
7	250	New England Patriots	Ryan Izzo	TE	Florida State	from Philadelphia via Seattle, New England, Seattle and Philadelphia (Note: No. 250: Philadelphia → Seattle → New England → Seattle → Philadelphia → New England. Multiple trades: Philadelphia → Seattle (PD). See Round 5: Seattle → Philadelphia. Seattle → New England (PD). Seattle traded this seventh-round pick to New England in exchange for CB Justin Coleman. New England → Seattle (PD) See Round 5: New England → Seattle. Seattle → Philadelphia (PD). See Round 5: Seattle → Philadelphia. Philadelphia → New England (D) See Round 7: New England → Philadelphia.)
7*	251	Los Angeles Chargers	Justin Jackson	RB	Northwestern	
7*	252	Cincinnati Bengals	Rod Taylor	G	Ole Miss	
7*	253	Cincinnati Bengals	Auden Tate	WR	Florida State	
7*	254	Arizona Cardinals	Korey Cunningham	T	Cincinnati	
7*	255	Buffalo Bills	Austin Proehl	WR	North Carolina	from Tampa Bay (Note: No. 255: Tampa Bay → Buffalo (D). See Round 1: Tampa Bay → Buffalo.)
7*	256	Washington Redskins	Trey Quinn	WR	SMU	from Atlanta via LA Rams (Note: No. 256: Atlanta → LA Rams → Washington. Multiple trades: Atlanta → LA Rams (D). See Round 6: LA Rams → Atlanta. LA Rams → Washington (D). See Round 6: LA Rams → Washington.)

== Notable undrafted players ==
^{†}	Pro Bowler

Original NFL team	Player	Pos.	College	Notes
Arizona Cardinals	Dennis Gardeck	LB	Sioux Falls	
Arizona Cardinals	Jonathan Owens	S	Missouri Western	
Arizona Cardinals	Trent Sherfield	WR	Vanderbilt	
Arizona Cardinals	Chris Streveler	QB	South Dakota	
Arizona Cardinals	Tavierre Thomas	CB	Ferris State	
Arizona Cardinals	Ezekiel Turner	LB	Washington	
Atlanta Falcons	J. C. Hassenauer	C	Alabama	
Atlanta Falcons	Jacob Tuioti-Mariner	DT	UCLA	
Baltimore Ravens	Chris Board	LB	North Dakota State	
Baltimore Ravens	Gus Edwards	RB	Rutgers	
Baltimore Ravens	Trent Sieg	LS	Colorado State	
Baltimore Ravens	Darious Williams	CB	UAB	
Buffalo Bills	Ike Boettger	G	Iowa	
Buffalo Bills	Robert Foster	WR	Alabama	
Buffalo Bills	Levi Wallace	CB	Alabama	
Carolina Panthers	Kyle Allen	QB	Houston	
Carolina Panthers	Reggie Bonnafon	RB	Louisville	
Chicago Bears	Abdullah Anderson	DT	Bucknell	
Chicago Bears	Ryan Nall	RB	Oregon State	
Chicago Bears	Josh Woods	LB	Maryland	
Cleveland Browns	Elijah Campbell	S	Northern Iowa	
Cleveland Browns	Daniel Ekuale	DT	Washington State	
Cleveland Browns	Dontrell Hilliard	RB	Tulane	
Cleveland Browns	D'Ernest Johnson	RB	South Florida	
Dallas Cowboys	Charvarius Ward ^{†}	CB	Middle Tennessee	
Denver Broncos	Phillip Lindsay ^{†}	RB	Colorado	First undrafted player in league history to surpass 1,000 yards in his first two seasons
Denver Broncos	Trey Marshall	S	Florida State	
Denver Broncos	Austin Schlottmann	C	TCU	
Detroit Lions	Mike Ford	CB	Southeast Missouri State	
Detroit Lions	Chris Payton-Jones	CB	Nebraska	
Detroit Lions	Brandon Powell	WR	Florida	
Green Bay Packers	Tim Boyle	QB	Eastern Kentucky	
Green Bay Packers	James Crawford	LB	Illinois	
Green Bay Packers	Raven Greene	S	James Madison	
Green Bay Packers	Tyler Lancaster	NT	Northwestern	
Green Bay Packers	Alex Light	T	Richmond	
Green Bay Packers	Kevin Rader	TE	Youngstown State	
Houston Texans	Andre Chachere	CB	San Jose State	
Houston Texans	Trevor Daniel	P	Tennessee	
Houston Texans	Vyncint Smith	WR	Limestone	
Indianapolis Colts	Michael Badgley	K	Miami (FL)	
Indianapolis Colts	George Odum	S	Central Arkansas	
Jacksonville Jaguars	Dee Delaney	CB	Miami (FL)	
Jacksonville Jaguars	Tre Herndon	CB	Vanderbilt	
Jacksonville Jaguars	Allen Lazard	WR	Iowa State	
Kansas City Chiefs	Ryan Hunter	G	Bowling Green	
Kansas City Chiefs	Ben Niemann	LB	Iowa	
Kansas City Chiefs	Byron Pringle	WR	Kansas State	
Kansas City Chiefs	Darrel Williams	RB	LSU	
Los Angeles Chargers	Tony Brown	CB	Alabama	
Los Angeles Chargers	Brandon Facyson	CB	Virginia Tech	
Los Angeles Chargers	Trent Scott	T	Grambling State	
Los Angeles Rams	KhaDarel Hodge ^{†}	WR	Prairie View A&M	
Los Angeles Rams	Steven Parker	S	Oklahoma	
Miami Dolphins	Greg Joseph	K	Florida Atlantic	
Minnesota Vikings	Chad Beebe	WR	Northern Illinois	
Minnesota Vikings	Mike Boone	RB	Cincinnati	
Minnesota Vikings	Holton Hill	CB	Texas	
Minnesota Vikings	Roc Thomas	RB	Jacksonville State	
New England Patriots	John Atkins	DT	Georgia	
New England Patriots	Corey Bojorquez	P	New Mexico	
New England Patriots	Trent Harris	DE	Miami (FL)	
New England Patriots	Frank Herron	DT	LSU	
New England Patriots	J. C. Jackson ^{†}	CB	Maryland	
New England Patriots	Jakob Johnson	FB	Tennessee	
New Orleans Saints	J. T. Gray ^{†}	S	Mississippi State	
New Orleans Saints	Keith Kirkwood	WR	Temple	
New Orleans Saints	Deon Yelder	TE	Western Kentucky	
New York Giants	Evan Brown	G	SMU	
New York Giants	Sean Chandler	S	Temple	
New York Giants	Nick Gates	T	Nebraska	
New York Giants	Grant Haley	CB	Penn State	
New York Giants	Joey Slye	K	Virginia Tech	
New York Jets	Frankie Luvu	LB	Washington State	
New York Jets	John Wolford	QB	Wake Forest	
Oakland Raiders	Jason Cabinda	FB	Penn State	
Oakland Raiders	Eddy Piñeiro	K	Florida	
Philadelphia Eagles	Josh Adams	RB	Notre Dame	
Philadelphia Eagles	Ryan Neal	S	Southern Illinois	
Philadelphia Eagles	Jeremy Reaves ^{†}	S	South Alabama	
Philadelphia Eagles	Brett Toth	G	Army	
Philadelphia Eagles	Chandon Sullivan	CB	Georgia State	
Pittsburgh Steelers	Ola Adeniyi	LB	Toledo	
San Francisco 49ers	Ross Dwelley	TE	San Diego	
San Francisco 49ers	Emmanuel Moseley	CB	Tennessee	
San Francisco 49ers	Coleman Shelton	C	Washington	
San Francisco 49ers	Jeff Wilson	RB	North Texas	
Seattle Seahawks	Poona Ford	DT	Texas	
Tampa Bay Buccaneers	Godwin Igwebuike	RB	Northwestern	
Tennessee Titans	Nick DeLuca	LB	North Dakota State	
Tennessee Titans	Sharif Finch	LB	Temple	
Tennessee Titans	Robert Spillane	LB	Western Michigan	
Tennessee Titans	Aaron Stinnie	G	James Madison	
Washington Redskins	Danny Johnson	CB	Southern	
Washington Redskins	Cam Sims	WR	Alabama	

== Supplemental draft ==
A supplemental draft was held on July 11, 2018. For each player selected in the supplemental draft, the team forfeits its pick in that round in the draft for the following season.

Rnd.	Pick	Team	Player	Pos.	College	Notes
3	–	New York Giants	Sam Beal	CB	Western Michigan	
6	–	Washington Redskins	Adonis Alexander	CB	Virginia Tech	

== Trades ==
(PD) indicates trades completed prior to the start of the draft (i.e. Pre-Draft), while (D) denotes trades which took place during the 2018 draft.

Round 1

Round 2

Round 3

Round 4

Round 5

Round 6

Round 7

== Media coverage ==
Coverage of the draft was broadcast by ESPN and NFL Network, with Fox also simulcasting NFL Network's coverage of the first two rounds of broadcast television (serving as a prelude for Fox's acquisition of Thursday Night Football for the 2018 season). ESPN aired coverage of the last four rounds on ABC. College GameDay broadcast a special edition from outside AT&T Stadium as a pre-show on ESPN, and its panel hosted a secondary broadcast of the first round on ESPN2. ESPN Deportes broadcast coverage in Spanish.

Telecasts of the first round across all three broadcasters (which included the expansion of coverage to broadcast television) drew a combined Nielsen overnight household rating of 8.4, and a total viewership of 11.214 million, making it the most-watched opening round since 2014. ESPN drew the largest single audience, with 5.336 million viewers, while Fox and NFL Network had a combined viewership of 5.74 million across both channels (3.776 million and 2.005 million individually).

== Summary ==
=== Selections by college athletic conference ===
Conference	Round 1	Round 2	Round 3	Round 4	Round 5	Round 6	Round 7	Total
NCAA Division I FBS football conferences
AAC	1	2	3	0	3	4	5	18
ACC	6	4	7	9	6	6	7	45
Big 12	1	2	5	3	4	3	2	20
Big Ten	4	5	3	7	7	5	2	33
C-USA	1	1	1	2	1	2	2	10
Ind. (FBS)	2	0	1	1	0	1	0	5
MAC	0	0	1	0	2	0	2	5
MW	3	1	1	0	0	1	3	9
Pac-12	4	4	4	4	5	7	2	30
SEC	10	10	6	6	4	8	9	53
Sun Belt	0	0	1	1	0	2	0	4
NCAA Division I FCS football conferences
Big Sky	0	0	0	1	0	0	0	1
CAA	0	0	0	1	1	1	0	3
IVY	0	0	0	0	1	1	0	2
MEAC	0	1	1	0	0	0	0	2
MVFC	0	1	0	0	2	0	0	3
NEC	0	0	0	0	0	1	0	1
OVC	0	0	0	0	1	0	1	2
Patriot	0	0	0	1	0	0	0	1
SoCon	0	0	0	0	0	1	0	1
Southland	0	1	0	1	0	1	0	3
NCAA Division II football conferences
CIAA	0	0	0	0	0	1	0	1
GLIAC	0	0	0	0	0	0	1	1
GNAC	0	0	1	0	0	0	0	1
MIAA	0	0	1	0	0	0	0	1
Non-college selections
NRL	0	0	0	0	0	0	1	1

=== Schools with multiple draft selections ===
Selections	Schools
12	Alabama
7	LSU, NC State, Ohio State
6	Florida State, Georgia, Miami (FL), Penn State
5	Florida, UCLA, Virginia Tech, Washington, Wisconsin
4	Auburn, Louisville, Mississippi State, Notre Dame, Oklahoma, Oklahoma State, Ole Miss, Stanford, Texas, UCF, USC
3	Arizona State, Boston College, Clemson, Iowa, North Carolina, Pittsburgh, SMU, Southern Miss, TCU, Tennessee, Texas A&M
2	Arkansas, Boise State, California, Indiana, Louisiana, Maryland, Memphis, Michigan, Oregon, Rutgers, San Diego State, South Florida, Temple, Texas Tech, Tulane, Virginia, Wake Forest, Washington State, Western Kentucky, Western Michigan

=== Selections by position ===
Position	Round 1	Round 2	Round 3	Round 4	Round 5	Round 6	Round 7	Total
Center	2	1	1	1	1	1	1	8
Cornerback	3	6	2	4	5	6	3	29
Defensive end	2	2	4	7	1	4	3	23
Defensive tackle	3	1	6	0	4	3	3	20
Fullback	0	0	0	0	1	0	1	2
Guard	1	4	0	0	2	2	1	10
Kicker	0	0	0	0	1	0	1	2
Linebacker	4	4	6	3	6	8	8	39
Long snapper	0	0	0	0	0	0	1	1
Offensive tackle	3	1	7	2	2	3	2	20
Punter	0	0	0	0	3	0	1	4
Quarterback	5	0	1	1	1	2	3	13
Running back	3	4	1	5	1	3	3	20
Safety	3	1	4	4	3	3	0	18
Tight end	1	2	2	5	2	1	1	14
Wide receiver	2	6	2	5	4	8	6	33

Position	Round 1	Round 2	Round 3	Round 4	Round 5	Round 6	Round 7	Total
Offense	17	18	14	19	14	20	18	120
Defense	15	14	22	18	19	24	17	129
Special teams	0	0	0	0	4	0	3	7
