= 2017 Alcorn State Braves football team =

American college football season

2017 Alcorn State Braves football

SWAC East Division champion

SWAC Championship Game, L 32–40 vs. Grambling State
- Conference: Southwestern Athletic Conference
- East Division
- Record: 7–5 (5–2 SWAC)
- Head coach: Fred McNair (2nd season)
- Offensive coordinator: Fred Kaiss (2nd season)
- Defensive coordinator: Cedric Thomas (2nd season)
- Home stadium: Casem-Spinks Stadium

2017 Southwestern Athletic Conference football standings
	Conf.			Overall
Team	W		L	W		L
East Division
Alcorn State xy	5	–	2	7	–	5
Alabama State	4	–	3	5	–	6
Alabama A&M	3	–	4	4	–	7
Jackson State	3	–	4	3	–	8
Mississippi Valley State	1	–	6	2	–	9
West Division
No. 16 Grambling State xy$	7	–	0	11	–	2
Southern	5	–	2	7	–	4
Prairie View A&M	4	–	3	6	–	5
Texas Southern	2	–	5	2	–	9
Arkansas–Pine Bluff	1	–	6	2	–	9
Championship: Grambling State 40, Alcorn State 32
$ – Conference champion; x – Division champion/co-champions; y – Championship game participant; Rankings from STATS Poll

The 2017 Alcorn State Braves football team represented Alcorn State University in the 2017 NCAA Division I FCS football season. The Braves were led by second-year head coach Fred McNair and played their home games at Casem-Spinks Stadium in Lorman, Mississippi as members of the East Division of the Southwestern Athletic Conference (SWAC). They finished the season 7–5, 5–2 in SWAC play to win the East Division. They lost the SWAC Championship Game to Grambling State.

== Schedule ==
Date	Time	Opponent	Site	TV	Result	Attendance
September 2	6:00 p.m.	Miles*	Casem-Spinks Stadium; Lorman, MS	BAA	W 50–21	10,751
September 8^{[a]}	6:00 p.m.	vs. FIU*	Legion Field^{[a]}; Birmingham, AL		L 10–17	5,017
September 16	6:00 p.m.	McNeese State*	Casem-Spinks Stadium; Lorman, MS	BAA	L 27–34	12,608
September 23	6:00 p.m.	Southern	Casem-Spinks Stadium; Lorman, MS	SWACDN	W 48–31	23,738
September 29	8:00 p.m.	at Texas Southern*	BBVA Compass Stadium; Houston, TX	AT&T SW	W 24–17	2,785
October 5	6:30 p.m.	at Alabama State	New ASU Stadium; Montgomery, AL	ESPNU	W 24–10	15,553
October 14	2:00 p.m.	Prairie View A&M^{†}	Casem-Spinks Stadium; Lorman, MS		W 34–21	21,509
October 21	2:00 p.m.	at No. 17 Grambling State	Eddie Robinson Stadium; Grambling, LA	SWACDN	L 14–41	12,147
November 4	2:00 p.m.	Alabama A&M	Casem-Spinks Stadium; Lorman, MS		W 47–22	7,515
November 11	2:00 p.m.	Mississippi Valley State	Casem-Spinks Stadium; Lorman, MS		W 59–0	6,957
November 18	2:00 p.m.	at Jackson State	Mississippi Veterans Memorial Stadium; Jackson, MS	SWACDN	L 3–7	12,903
December 2	3:30 p.m.	vs. Grambling State	NRG Stadium; Houston, TX (SWAC Championship Game)	ESPNU	L 32–40	24,610
*Non-conference game; ^{†}Homecoming; Rankings from STATS FCS Poll released prior to game Poll released prior to the game; All times are in Central time

^{^[a]}The game between Alcorn State and FIU was relocated to Legion Field at Birmingham, Alabama due to Hurricane Irma.

- Source: Schedule

== Game summaries ==
=== Miles ===
	1	2	3	4	Total
Golden Bears	7	0	7	7	21
Braves	14	10	16	10	50

=== At FIU ===
	1	2	3	4	Total
Braves	0	7	0	3	10
Panthers	0	7	3	7	17

=== McNeese State ===
	1	2	3	4	Total
Cowboys	7	7	6	14	34
Braves	7	6	7	7	27

=== Southern ===
	1	2	3	4	Total
Jaguars	3	21	7	0	31
Braves	3	17	21	7	48

=== At Texas Southern ===
	1	2	3	4	Total
Braves	14	0	7	3	24
Tigers	7	0	7	3	17

=== At Alabama State ===
	1	2	3	4	Total
Braves	10	14	0	0	24
Hornets	0	0	7	3	10

=== Prairie View A&M ===
	1	2	3	4	Total
Panthers	14	0	0	7	21
Braves	0	24	3	7	34

=== At Grambling State ===
	1	2	3	4	Total
Braves	0	7	0	7	14
Tigers	7	17	10	7	41

=== Alabama A&M ===
	1	2	3	4	Total
Bulldogs	0	10	3	9	22
Braves	13	6	21	7	47

=== Mississippi Valley State ===
	1	2	3	4	Total
Delta Devils	0	0	0	0	0
Braves	14	14	28	3	59

=== At Jackson State ===
	1	2	3	4	Total
Braves	3	0	0	0	3
Tigers	0	7	0	0	7

=== Vs. Grambling State (SWAC Championship) ===
	1	2	3	4	Total
Braves	10	0	0	22	32
Tigers	10	28	0	2	40
