= 2017 Alabama A&M Bulldogs football team =

American college football season

2017 Alabama A&M Bulldogs football
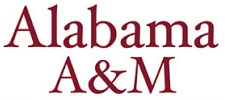
- Conference: Southwestern Athletic Conference
- East Division
- Record: 4–7 (3–4 SWAC)
- Head coach: James Spady (4th season)
- Offensive coordinator: Andy Fuller (11th season)
- Defensive coordinator: Travis Pearson (2nd season)
- Home stadium: Louis Crews Stadium

2017 Southwestern Athletic Conference football standings
	Conf.			Overall
Team	W		L	W		L
East Division
Alcorn State xy	5	–	2	7	–	5
Alabama State	4	–	3	5	–	6
Alabama A&M	3	–	4	4	–	7
Jackson State	3	–	4	3	–	8
Mississippi Valley State	1	–	6	2	–	9
West Division
No. 16 Grambling State xy$	7	–	0	11	–	2
Southern	5	–	2	7	–	4
Prairie View A&M	4	–	3	6	–	5
Texas Southern	2	–	5	2	–	9
Arkansas–Pine Bluff	1	–	6	2	–	9
Championship: Grambling State 40, Alcorn State 32
$ – Conference champion; x – Division champion/co-champions; y – Championship game participant; Rankings from STATS Poll

The 2017 Alabama A&M Bulldogs football team represented Alabama Agricultural and Mechanical University in the 2017 NCAA Division I FCS football season. The Bulldogs were led by fourth-year head coach James Spady and played their home games at Louis Crews Stadium in Huntsville, Alabama as members of the East Division of the Southwestern Athletic Conference. They finished the season 4–7, 3–4 in SWAC play to finish in third place in the East Division.

== Schedule ==
Date	Time	Opponent	Site	TV	Result	Attendance
September 2	2:30 p.m.	at UAB*	Legion Field; Birmingham, AL	Stadium	L 7–38	45,212
September 9	3:00 p.m.	at Vanderbilt*	Vanderbilt Stadium; Nashville, TN	SECN	L 0–42	25,802
September 17	6:00 p.m.	at South Alabama*	Ladd–Peebles Stadium; Mobile, AL	ESPN3	L 0–45	18,103
September 24	6:00 p.m.	Texas Southern	Louis Crews Stadium; Huntsville, AL (Louis Crews Classic)		W 30–13	6,356
September 30	2:00 p.m.	Arkansas–Pine Bluff^{†}	Lewis Crews Stadium; Huntsville, AL		W 27–14	15,685
October 7	6:00 p.m.	at Southern	Ace W. Mumford Stadium; Baton Rouge, LA		L 14–35	15,279
October 14	2:00 p.m.	Mississippi Valley State	Lewis Crews Stadium; Huntsville, AL		W 49–14	2,269
October 28	2:30 p.m.	vs. Alabama State	Legion Field; Birmingham, AL (Magic City Classic)	ESPN3	L 16–21	61,221
November 4	2:00 p.m.	at Alcorn State	Casem-Spinks Stadium; Lorman, MS		L 22–47	7,515
November 11	1:00 p.m.	Jackson State	Louis Crews Stadium; Huntsville, AL		L 7–10	5,755
November 18	1:00 p.m.	Kentucky State*	Louis Crews Stadium; Huntsville, AL		W 21–13	789
*Non-conference game; ^{†}Homecoming; All times are in Central time
