= 2017 Arkansas–Pine Bluff Golden Lions football team =

American college football season

2017 Arkansas–Pine Bluff Golden Lions football
- Conference: Southwestern Athletic Conference
- West Division
- Record: 2–9 (1–6 SWAC)
- Head coach: Monte Coleman (10th season)
- Offensive coordinator: Ted White (3rd season)
- Defensive coordinator: Monte Coleman (12th season)
- Home stadium: Golden Lion Stadium

2017 Southwestern Athletic Conference football standings
	Conf.			Overall
Team	W		L	W		L
East Division
Alcorn State xy	5	–	2	7	–	5
Alabama State	4	–	3	5	–	6
Alabama A&M	3	–	4	4	–	7
Jackson State	3	–	4	3	–	8
Mississippi Valley State	1	–	6	2	–	9
West Division
No. 16 Grambling State xy$	7	–	0	11	–	2
Southern	5	–	2	7	–	4
Prairie View A&M	4	–	3	6	–	5
Texas Southern	2	–	5	2	–	9
Arkansas–Pine Bluff	1	–	6	2	–	9
Championship: Grambling State 40, Alcorn State 32
$ – Conference champion; x – Division champion/co-champions; y – Championship game participant; Rankings from STATS Poll

The 2017 Arkansas–Pine Bluff Golden Lions football team represented the University of Arkansas at Pine Bluff in the 2017 NCAA Division I FCS football season. The Golden Lions were led by 10th-year head coach Monte Coleman and played their home games at Golden Lion Stadium in Pine Bluff, Arkansas as members of the West Division of the Southwestern Athletic Conference (SWAC). The Golden Lions finished the season 2–9, 1–6 in SWAC play to finish in last place in the West Division.

On November 20, head coach Monte Coleman was fired. He finished at APBU with a ten-year record of 40–71.

== Preseason ==
The Golden Lions were picked to finish in last place in the West Division.

== Schedule ==
Date	Time	Opponent	Site	TV	Result	Attendance
September 2	6:00 p.m.	Morehouse*	Golden Lion Stadium; Pine Bluff, AR	UAPBtv	W 23–10	5,553
September 9	6:30 p.m.	at Akron*	InfoCision Stadium; Akron, OH	ESPN3	L 3–52	17,464
September 16	6:00 p.m.	at Arkansas State*	Centennial Bank Stadium; Jonesboro, AR	ESPN3	L 3–48	24,371
September 23	6:00 p.m.	at Jackson State	Mississippi Veterans Memorial Stadium; Jackson, MS		W 34–27 ^{OT}	14,855
September 30	2:00 p.m.	at Alabama A&M	Louis Crews Stadium; Huntsville, AL		L 14–27	15,685
October 7	6:00 p.m.	Mississippi Valley State	Golden Lion Stadium; Pine Bluff, AR	UAPBtv	L 31–38	4,030
October 14	2:30 p.m.	Central State*^{†}	Golden Lion Stadium; Pine Bluff, AR	UAPBtv	L 35–40	11,045
October 28	4:00 p.m.	vs. Southern	War Memorial Stadium; Little Rock, AR		L 40–47	16,760
November 4	2:30 p.m.	No. 13 Grambling State	Golden Lion Stadium; Pine Bluff, AR	UAPBtv	L 26–31	4,007
November 11	1:00 p.m.	at Prairie View A&M	Panther Stadium at Blackshear Field; Prairie View, TX		L 12–35	8,092
November 18	2:30 p.m.	vs. Texas Southern	War Memorial Stadium; Little Rock, AR		L 10–24	1,220
*Non-conference game; ^{†}Homecoming; Rankings from STATS Poll released prior to the game; All times are in Central time
