= 2017 Alabama State Hornets football team =

American college football season

2017 Alabama State Hornets football
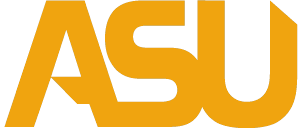
- Conference: Southwestern Athletic Conference
- East Division
- Record: 5–6 (4–3 SWAC)
- Head coach: Brian Jenkins (3rd season; first 5 games); Donald Hill-Eley (interim, final 6 games)
- Offensive coordinator: Mark Orlando (3rd season)
- Defensive coordinator: Osita Alaribe (1st season)
- Home stadium: New ASU Stadium

2017 Southwestern Athletic Conference football standings
	Conf.			Overall
Team	W		L	W		L
East Division
Alcorn State xy	5	–	2	7	–	5
Alabama State	4	–	3	5	–	6
Alabama A&M	3	–	4	4	–	7
Jackson State	3	–	4	3	–	8
Mississippi Valley State	1	–	6	2	–	9
West Division
No. 16 Grambling State xy$	7	–	0	11	–	2
Southern	5	–	2	7	–	4
Prairie View A&M	4	–	3	6	–	5
Texas Southern	2	–	5	2	–	9
Arkansas–Pine Bluff	1	–	6	2	–	9
Championship: Grambling State 40, Alcorn State 32
$ – Conference champion; x – Division champion/co-champions; y – Championship game participant; Rankings from STATS Poll

The 2017 Alabama State Hornets football team represented Alabama State University as a member of the East Division of the Southwestern Athletic Conference (SWAC) during 2017 NCAA Division I FCS football season. The Hornets were led by third-year head coach Brian Jenkins for the first five games of the season before he was fired. Donald Hill-Eley was named the interim head coach for the remainder of the season. Alabama State compiled an overall record of 5–6 with a mark of 4–3 in conference play, placing second in the SWAC East Division. The team played home games at New ASU Stadium in Montgomery, Alabama.

== Schedule ==
Date	Time	Opponent	Site	TV	Result	Attendance
September 2	7:00 p.m.	Tuskegee*	New ASU Stadium; Montgomery, AL	ASAA	L 6–14	25,442
September 9	5:00 p.m.	at Troy*	Veterans Memorial Stadium; Troy, AL	ESPN3	L 7–34	29,278
September 16	7:00 p.m.	Kennesaw State*	New ASU Stadium; Montgomery, AL	ASAA	L 14–20	11,000
September 23	7:00 p.m.	Prairie View A&M	New ASU Stadium; Montgomery, AL	ASAA	L 0–34	10,500
October 5	6:30 p.m.	Alcorn State	New ASU Stadium; Montgomery, AL	ESPNU	L 10–24	15,553
October 14	2:00 p.m.	at Texas Southern	BBVA Compass Stadium; Houston, TX	AT&T SW	W 23–16	8,462
October 28	2:30 p.m.	vs. Alabama A&M	Legion Field; Birmingham, AL (Magic City Classic)	ESPN3	W 21–16	61,221
November 4	1:00 p.m.	at Jackson State	Mississippi Veterans Memorial Stadium; Jackson, MS		W 13–3	18,585
November 11	2:00 p.m.	No. 13 Grambling State	New ASU Stadium; Montgomery, AL	ASAA	L 7–24	9,872
November 18	1:00 p.m.	at Mississippi Valley State	Rice–Totten Stadium; Itta Bena, MS		W 16–10	936
November 23	2:00 p.m.	Edward Waters*^{†}	New ASU Stadium; Montgomery, AL (Turkey Day Classic)	ASAA	W 37–3	15,322
*Non-conference game; ^{†}Homecoming; Rankings from STATS Poll released prior to the game; All times are in Central time
