= 2017 Mississippi Valley State Delta Devils football team =

American college football season

2017 Mississippi Valley State Delta Devils football
- Conference: Southwestern Athletic Conference
- East Division
- Record: 2–9 (1–8 SWAC)
- Head coach: Rick Comegy (4th season)
- Offensive coordinator: Ray Caldwell (2nd season)
- Defensive coordinator: Vincent Dancy (3rd season)
- Home stadium: Rice–Totten Stadium

2017 Southwestern Athletic Conference football standings
	Conf.			Overall
Team	W		L	W		L
East Division
Alcorn State xy	5	–	2	7	–	5
Alabama State	4	–	3	5	–	6
Alabama A&M	3	–	4	4	–	7
Jackson State	3	–	4	3	–	8
Mississippi Valley State	1	–	6	2	–	9
West Division
No. 16 Grambling State xy$	7	–	0	11	–	2
Southern	5	–	2	7	–	4
Prairie View A&M	4	–	3	6	–	5
Texas Southern	2	–	5	2	–	9
Arkansas–Pine Bluff	1	–	6	2	–	9
Championship: Grambling State 40, Alcorn State 32
$ – Conference champion; x – Division champion/co-champions; y – Championship game participant; Rankings from STATS Poll

The 2017 Mississippi Valley State Delta Devils football team represented Mississippi Valley State University as a member of the East Division of the Southwestern Athletic Conference (SWAC) during the 2017 NCAA Division I FCS football season. Led by Rick Comegy in his fourth and final season as head coach, the Delta Devils compiled an overall record of 2–9 and a mark of 1–8 in conference play, placing last out of five teams in the SWAC's East Division. Mississippi Valley State played home games at Rice–Totten Stadium in Itta Bena, Mississippi.

On November 20, Mississippi Valley State announced that Comegy's contract would not be renewed. He finished four-year tenure as head coach of the Delta Devils with a record of 6–38.

== Schedule ==
Date	Time	Opponent	Site	TV	Result	Attendance
September 2	2:30 p.m.	at No. 2 North Dakota State*	Fargodome; Fargo, ND	ESPN3	L 7–72	18,502
September 9	6:00 p.m.	at Southern Illinois*	Saluki Stadium; Carbondale, IL	ESPN3	L 3–55	8,194
September 23	6:00 p.m.	No. 22 Grambling State	Rice–Totten Stadium; Itta Bena, MS		L 6–38	2,374
September 30	6:00 p.m.	at Charleston Southern*	Buccaneer Field; Charleston, SC		L 7–58	1,456
October 7	6:00 p.m.	at Arkansas–Pine Bluff	Golden Lion Stadium; Pine Bluff, AR		W 38–31	4,030
October 14	3:00 p.m.	at Alabama A&M	Louis Crews Stadium; Normal, AL		L 14–49	2,269
October 21	2:00 p.m.	Virginia–Lynchburg*^{†}	Rice–Totten Stadium; Itta Bena, MS		W 53–5	9,875
October 28	2:00 p.m.	Jackson State	Rice–Totten Stadium; Itta Bena, MS		L 5–24	7,925
November 4	1:00 p.m.	Texas Southern	Rice–Totten Stadium; Itta Bena, MS		L 21–38	2,987
November 11	2:00 p.m.	at Alcorn State	Casem-Spinks Stadium; Lorman, MS		L 0–59	6,957
November 18	1:00 p.m.	Alabama State	Rice–Totten Stadium; Itta Bena, MS		L 10–16	936
*Non-conference game; ^{†}Homecoming; Rankings from STATS Poll released prior to the game; All times are in Central time
