= 2017 Texas Southern Tigers football team =

American college football season

2017 Texas Southern Tigers football
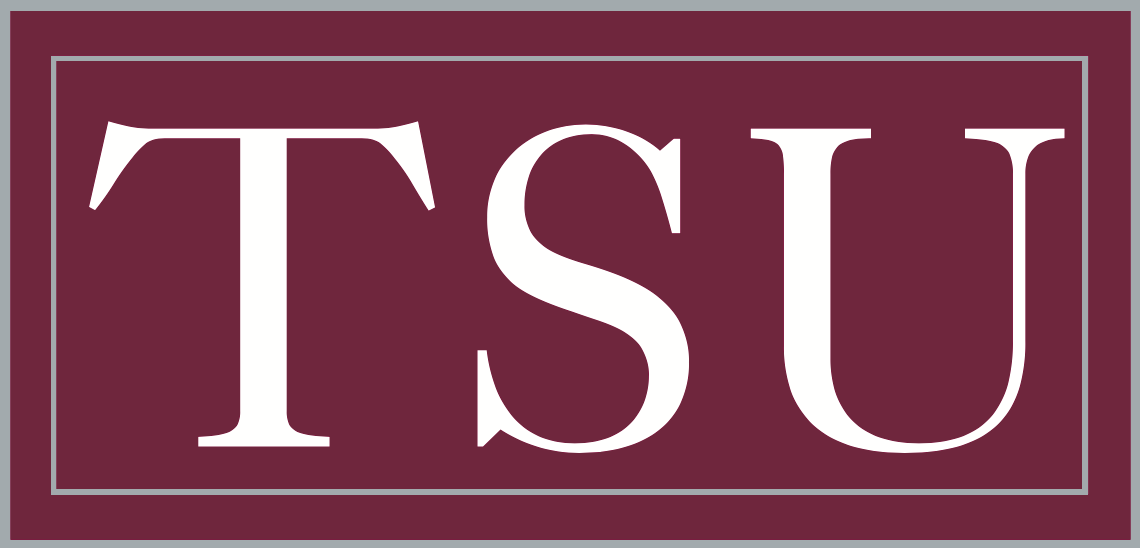
- Conference: Southwestern Athletic Conference
- West Division
- Record: 2–9 (2–5 SWAC)
- Head coach: Michael Haywood (2nd season)
- Offensive coordinator: Greg Gregory (2nd season)
- Defensive coordinator: Tom Anthony (2nd season)
- Home stadium: BBVA Compass Stadium

2017 Southwestern Athletic Conference football standings
	Conf.			Overall
Team	W		L	W		L
East Division
Alcorn State xy	5	–	2	7	–	5
Alabama State	4	–	3	5	–	6
Alabama A&M	3	–	4	4	–	7
Jackson State	3	–	4	3	–	8
Mississippi Valley State	1	–	6	2	–	9
West Division
No. 16 Grambling State xy$	7	–	0	11	–	2
Southern	5	–	2	7	–	4
Prairie View A&M	4	–	3	6	–	5
Texas Southern	2	–	5	2	–	9
Arkansas–Pine Bluff	1	–	6	2	–	9
Championship: Grambling State 40, Alcorn State 32
$ – Conference champion; x – Division champion/co-champions; y – Championship game participant; Rankings from STATS Poll

The 2017 Texas Southern Tigers football team represented Texas Southern University a member of the West Division of the Southwestern Athletic Conference (SWAC) during the 2017 NCAA Division I FCS football season. Led by second-year head coach Michael Haywood, the Tigers compiled an overall record of 2–9 with a mark of 2–5 in conference play, placing fourth in the SWAC's West Division. Texas Southern played home games at BBVA Compass Stadium in Houston.

== Schedule ==
Date	Time	Opponent	Site	TV	Result	Attendance
August 26	11:00 a.m.	at Florida A&M*	Bragg Memorial Stadium; Tallahassee, FL (Jake Gaither Classic)	ESPNU	L 7–29	15,401
September 7	7:30 p.m.	Houston Baptist*	BBVA Compass Stadium; Houston, TX	AT&T SW	L 17–24	6,218
September 23	6:00 p.m.	at Alabama A&M	Louis Crews Stadium; Normal, AL		L 13–30	6,356
September 29	8:00 p.m.	Alcorn State*	BBVA Compass Stadium; Houston, TX	AT&T SW	L 17–24	2,785
October 7	6:00 p.m.	at Kennesaw State*	Fifth Third Bank Stadium; Kennesaw, GA	WPCH via Big South DN	L 3–48	6,743
October 14	2:00 p.m.	Alabama State^{†}	BBVA Compass Stadium; Houston, TX	AT&T SW	L 16–23	8,462
October 28	2:00 p.m.	at Grambling State	Eddie Robinson Stadium; Grambling, LA (Red River Classic)		L 24–50	18,350
November 4	1:00 p.m.	at Mississippi Valley State	Rice–Totten Stadium; Itta Bena, MS		W 38–21	2,987
November 11	5:00 p.m.	Southern	BBVA Compass Stadium; Houston, TX	AT&T SW	L 7–33	12,427
November 18	2:30 p.m.	vs. Arkansas–Pine Bluff	War Memorial Stadium; Little Rock, AR		W 24–10	1,220
November 25	8:00 p.m.	Prairie View A&M	BBVA Compass Stadium; Houston, TX (Labor Day Classic)	AT&T SW	L 16–30	14,102
*Non-conference game; ^{†}Homecoming; All times are in Central time

== Preseason ==
The Tigers were picked to finish in fourth place in the West Division.

== Game summaries ==
=== At Florida A&M ===
	1	2	3	4	Total
Tigers	0	0	0	7	7
Rattlers	7	13	9	0	29

=== Houston Baptist ===
	1	2	3	4	Total
Huskies	7	0	7	10	24
Tigers	3	7	0	7	17

=== At Alabama A&M ===
	1	2	3	4	Total
Tigers	0	0	13	0	13
Bulldogs	3	20	7	0	30

=== Alcorn State ===
	1	2	3	4	Total
Braves	14	0	7	3	24
Tigers	7	0	7	3	17

=== At Kennesaw State ===
	1	2	3	4	Total
Tigers	0	3	0	0	3
Owls	10	24	7	7	48

=== Alabama State ===
	1	2	3	4	Total
Hornets	3	7	10	3	23
Tigers	7	9	0	0	16

=== At Grambling State ===
	1	2	3	4	Total
TXSO Tigers	3	7	0	14	24
GSU Tigers	14	13	7	16	50

=== At Mississippi Valley State ===
	1	2	3	4	Total
Tigers	7	14	0	17	38
Delta Devils	0	7	7	7	21

=== Southern ===
	1	2	3	4	Total
Jaguars	7	6	13	7	33
Tigers	0	0	0	7	7

=== vs Arkansas–Pine Bluff ===
	1	2	3	4	Total
Golden Lions	3	7	0	0	10
Tigers	7	7	10	0	24

=== Prairie View A&M ===
	1	2	3	4	Total
Panthers	0	14	0	16	30
Tigers	0	3	6	7	16
