= 2017 Jackson State Tigers football team =

American college football season

2017 Jackson State Tigers football
- Conference: Southwestern Athletic Conference
- East Division
- Record: 3–8 (3–4 SWAC)
- Head coach: Tony Hughes (2nd season)
- Offensive coordinator: Chad Germany (2nd season)
- Offensive scheme: Spread
- Defensive coordinator: John Hendrick (2nd season)
- Base defense: 3–4
- Home stadium: Mississippi Veterans Memorial Stadium

2017 Southwestern Athletic Conference football standings
	Conf.			Overall
Team	W		L	W		L
East Division
Alcorn State xy	5	–	2	7	–	5
Alabama State	4	–	3	5	–	6
Alabama A&M	3	–	4	4	–	7
Jackson State	3	–	4	3	–	8
Mississippi Valley State	1	–	6	2	–	9
West Division
No. 16 Grambling State xy$	7	–	0	11	–	2
Southern	5	–	2	7	–	4
Prairie View A&M	4	–	3	6	–	5
Texas Southern	2	–	5	2	–	9
Arkansas–Pine Bluff	1	–	6	2	–	9
Championship: Grambling State 40, Alcorn State 32
$ – Conference champion; x – Division champion/co-champions; y – Championship game participant; Rankings from STATS Poll

The 2017 Jackson State Tigers football team represented Jackson State University in the 2017 NCAA Division I FCS football season. The Tigers were led by second-year head coach Tony Hughes and played their home games at Mississippi Veterans Memorial Stadium in Jackson, Mississippi as members of the East Division of the Southwestern Athletic Conference (SWAC). They finished the season 3–8, 3–4 in SWAC play to finish in fourth place in the East Division.

== Schedule ==
Date	Time	Opponent	Site	TV	Result	Attendance
September 2	7:00 p.m.	at TCU*	Amon G. Carter Stadium; Fort Worth, TX	FSN	L 0–63	42,709
September 9	6:00 p.m.	vs. No. 23 Tennessee State*	Liberty Bowl Memorial Stadium; Memphis, TN (Southern Heritage Classic)	FSS	L 15–17	47,407
September 16	6:00 p.m.	at No. 22 Grambling State*	Eddie Robinson Stadium; Grambling, LA	ESPN3	L 21–36	16,513
September 23	6:00 p.m.	Arkansas–Pine Bluff	Mississippi Veterans Memorial Stadium; Jackson, MS		L 27–34 ^{OT}	14,855
September 30	4:00 p.m.	at Prairie View A&M	Panther Stadium; Prairie View, TX		L 9–38	6,601
October 14	6:00 p.m.	vs. Tuskegee*	Ladd–Peebles Stadium; Mobile, AL		L 7–33	
October 21	6:00 p.m.	Southern	Mississippi Veterans Memorial Stadium; Jackson, MS (BoomBox Classic)		L 17–35	14,000
October 28	2:00 p.m.	at Mississippi Valley State	Rice–Totten Field; Itta Bena, MS		W 24–5	7,925
November 4	2:00 p.m.	Alabama State	Mississippi Veterans Memorial Stadium; Jackson, MS		L 3–13	18,585
November 11	1:00 p.m.	at Alabama A&M	Louis Crews Stadium; Huntsville, AL		W 10–7	5,755
November 18	2:00 p.m.	Alcorn State	Mississippi Veterans Memorial Stadium; Jackson, MS		W 7–3	12,903
*Non-conference game; Rankings from STATS FCS Poll released prior to game Poll released prior to the game; All times are in Central time

- Source: Schedule

== Game summaries ==
=== At TCU ===
	1	2	3	4	Total
Tigers	0	0	0	0	0
Horned Frogs	21	14	21	7	63

=== vs Tennessee State ===
	1	2	3	4	Total
No. 23 TSU Tigers	10	0	0	7	17
JSU Tigers	3	6	0	6	15

=== At Grambling State ===
	1	2	3	4	Total
JSU Tigers	7	7	7	0	21
No. 22 GSU Tigers	9	10	3	14	36

=== Arkansas–Pine Bluff ===
	1	2	3	4	OT	Total
Golden Lions	7	9	0	11	7	34
Tigers	7	10	10	0	0	27

=== At Prairie View A&M ===
	1	2	3	4	Total
Tigers	3	0	0	6	9
Panthers	17	0	14	7	38

=== vs Tuskegee ===
	1	2	3	4	Total
Golden Tigers	6	7	14	6	33
Tigers	0	7	0	0	7

=== Southern ===
	1	2	3	4	Total
Jaguars	7	14	14	0	35
Tigers	10	0	7	0	17

=== At Mississippi Valley State ===
	1	2	3	4	Total
Tigers	0	10	7	7	24
Delta Devils	3	0	0	2	5

=== Alabama State ===
	1	2	3	4	Total
Hornets	3	3	7	0	13
Tigers	0	3	0	0	3

=== At Alabama A&M ===
	1	2	3	4	Total
Tigers	0	0	0	10	10
Bulldogs	0	0	7	0	7

=== Alcorn State ===
	1	2	3	4	Total
Braves	3	0	0	0	3
Tigers	0	7	0	0	7
