= 2017 Grambling State Tigers football team =

American college football season

2017 Grambling State Tigers football

SWAC champion SWAC West Division champion

SWAC Championship Game, W 40–32 vs. Alcorn State

Celebration Bowl, L 14–21 vs. North Carolina A&T
- Conference: Southwestern Athletic Conference
- West Division

Ranking
- STATS: No. 16
- FCS Coaches: No. 14
- Record: 11–2 (7–0 SWAC)
- Head coach: Broderick Fobbs (4th season)
- Offensive coordinator: Eric Dooley (4th season)
- Defensive coordinator: Everett Todd (4th season)
- Home stadium: Eddie Robinson Stadium

2017 Southwestern Athletic Conference football standings
	Conf.			Overall
Team	W		L	W		L
East Division
Alcorn State xy	5	–	2	7	–	5
Alabama State	4	–	3	5	–	6
Alabama A&M	3	–	4	4	–	7
Jackson State	3	–	4	3	–	8
Mississippi Valley State	1	–	6	2	–	9
West Division
No. 16 Grambling State xy$	7	–	0	11	–	2
Southern	5	–	2	7	–	4
Prairie View A&M	4	–	3	6	–	5
Texas Southern	2	–	5	2	–	9
Arkansas–Pine Bluff	1	–	6	2	–	9
Championship: Grambling State 40, Alcorn State 32
$ – Conference champion; x – Division champion/co-champions; y – Championship game participant; Rankings from STATS Poll

The 2017 Grambling State Tigers football team represented Grambling State University in the 2017 NCAA Division I FCS football season. The Tigers were led by fourth-year head coach Broderick Fobbs and played their home games at Eddie Robinson Stadium in Grambling, Louisiana as members of the West Division of the Southwestern Athletic Conference (SWAC). The Tigers finished the season 11–2, 7–0 in SWAC play to win the West Division. They defeated Alcorn State in the SWAC Championship Game, receiving the conference's bid to the Celebration Bowl where they lost to North Carolina A&T.

== Preseason ==
The Tigers were picked to finish first in the West Division.

== Schedule ==
Date	Time	Opponent	Rank	Site	TV	Result	Attendance	Source
September 2	7:00 p.m.	at Tulane*	No. 21	Yulman Stadium; New Orleans, LA	ESPN3	L 14–43	15,940	
September 9	6:00 p.m.	Northwestern State*	No. 24	Eddie Robinson Stadium; Grambling, LA		W 23–10	12,689	
September 16	6:00 p.m.	Jackson State*	No. 24	Eddie Robinson Stadium; Grambling, LA	ESPN3	W 36–21	16,513	
September 23	6:00 p.m.	at Mississippi Valley State	No. 22	Rice–Totten Stadium; Itta Bena, MS		W 38–6	2,374	
September 30	3:30 p.m.	vs. Clark Atlanta*	No. 21	Soldier Field; Chicago, IL (Chicago Football Classic)		W 31–20	16,429	
October 7	4:00 p.m.	vs. Prairie View A&M	No. 21	Cotton Bowl; Dallas, TX (State Fair Classic)		W 34–21	55,231	
October 21	2:00 p.m.	Alcorn State	No. 17	Eddie Robinson Stadium; Grambling, LA	SWAC DN	W 41–14	12,147	
October 28	2:00 p.m.	Texas Southern^{†}	No. 15	Eddie Robinson Stadium; Grambling, LA (Red River Classic)		W 50–24	18,350	
November 4	2:30 p.m.	at Arkansas–Pine Bluff	No. 13	Golden Lion Stadium; Pine Bluff, AR		W 31–26	4,007	
November 11	2:00 p.m.	at Alabama State	No. 13	New ASU Stadium; Montgomery, AL	SWAC DN	W 24–7	9,872	
November 25	4:00 p.m.	vs. Southern	No. 13	Mercedes-Benz Superdome; New Orleans, LA (Bayou Classic)	NBCSN	W 30–21	66,650	
December 2	3:30 p.m.	vs. Alcorn State	No. 13	NRG Stadium; Houston, TX (SWAC Championship Game)	ESPNU	W 40–32	24,610	
December 16	12:00 p.m.	vs. No. 7 North Carolina A&T*	No. 13	Mercedes-Benz Stadium; Atlanta, GA (Celebration Bowl)	ABC	L 14–21	25,873	
*Non-conference game; ^{†}Homecoming; Rankings from STATS Poll released prior to the game; All times are in Central time

== Ranking movements ==
Ranking movements Legend: ██ Increase in ranking ██ Decrease in ranking
	Week													
Poll	Pre	1	2	3	4	5	6	7	8	9	10	11	12	Final
STATS FCS	21	24	24	22	21	21	20	17	15	13	13	13	13	16
Coaches	21	23	25	22	19	19	19	17	13	12	11	11	12	14
