= 2017 Prairie View A&M Panthers football team =

American college football season

2017 Prairie View A&M Panthers football
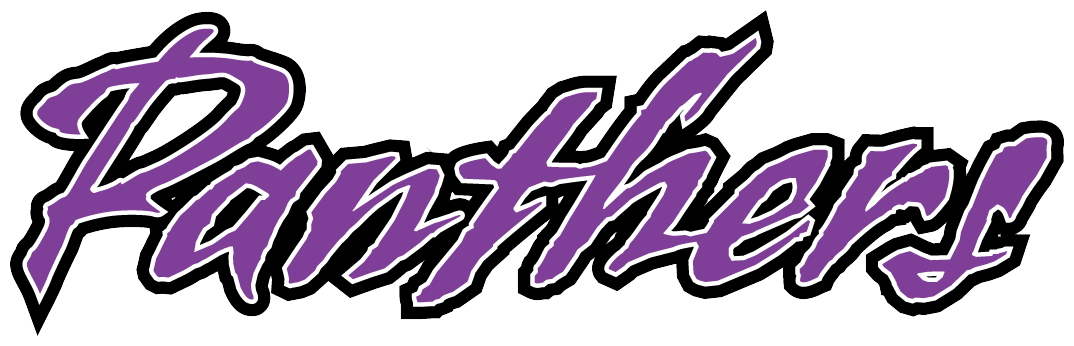
- Conference: Southwestern Athletic Conference
- West Division
- Record: 6–5 (4–3 SWAC)
- Head coach: Willie Simmons (3rd season)
- Offensive coordinator: Alex Jackson (3rd season)
- Defensive coordinator: Ralph Street (3rd season)
- Home stadium: Panther Stadium at Blackshear Field

2017 Southwestern Athletic Conference football standings
	Conf.			Overall
Team	W		L	W		L
East Division
Alcorn State xy	5	–	2	7	–	5
Alabama State	4	–	3	5	–	6
Alabama A&M	3	–	4	4	–	7
Jackson State	3	–	4	3	–	8
Mississippi Valley State	1	–	6	2	–	9
West Division
No. 16 Grambling State xy$	7	–	0	11	–	2
Southern	5	–	2	7	–	4
Prairie View A&M	4	–	3	6	–	5
Texas Southern	2	–	5	2	–	9
Arkansas–Pine Bluff	1	–	6	2	–	9
Championship: Grambling State 40, Alcorn State 32
$ – Conference champion; x – Division champion/co-champions; y – Championship game participant; Rankings from STATS Poll

The 2017 Prairie View A&M Panthers football team represented Prairie View A&M University in the 2017 NCAA Division I FCS football season. The Panthers were led by third-year head coach Willie Simmons and played their home games at Panther Stadium at Blackshear Field in Prairie View, Texas as members of the West Division of the Southwestern Athletic Conference (SWAC). The Panthers finished the season 6–5, 4–3 in SWAC play to finish in third place in the West Division.

On December 9, head coach Willie Simmons resigned to become the head coach at Florida A&M He finished at PVA&M with a three-year record of 21–11.

== Preseason ==
The Panthers were picked to finish in third place in the West Division.

== Schedule ==
Date	Time	Opponent	Site	TV	Result	Attendance
September 7	6:30 p.m.	No. 3 Sam Houston State*	Panther Stadium at Blackshear Field; Prairie View, TX	ESPNU	L 31–44	8,465
September 16	6:00 p.m.	at Nicholls State*	John L. Guidry Stadium; Thibodaux, LA	SLDN	L 13–44	8,212
September 23	7:00 p.m.	at Alabama State	New ASU Stadium; Montgomery, AL	ASAA	W 34–0	10,500
September 30	4:00 p.m.	Jackson State	Panther Stadium at Blackshear Field; Prairie View, TX		W 38–9	6,601
October 7	4:00 p.m.	vs. Grambling State	Cotton Bowl; Dallas, TX (State Fair Classic)		L 21–34	55,231
October 14	2:00 p.m.	at Alcorn State	Casem-Spinks Stadium; Lorman, MS		L 21–34	21,509
October 28	2:00 p.m.	Bacone*^{†}	Panther Stadium at Blackshear Field; Prairie View, TX		W 34–17	10,627
November 4	4:00 p.m.	at Southern	Ace W. Mumford Stadium; Baton Rouge, LA		L 31–37	13,085
November 11	1:00 p.m.	at Arkansas–Pine Bluff	Panther Stadium at Blackshear Field; Prairie View, TX		W 35–12	8,092
November 16	6:00 p.m.	at Incarnate Word*	Gayle and Tom Benson Stadium; San Antonio, TX		W 42–28	4,430
November 25	8:00 p.m.	at Texas Southern	BBVA Compass Stadium; Houston, TX (Labor Day Classic)	AT&T SW	W 30–16	14,102
*Non-conference game; ^{†}Homecoming; Rankings from STATS Poll released prior to the game; All times are in Central time
