= 2017 Southern Jaguars football team =

American college football season

2017 Southern Jaguars football
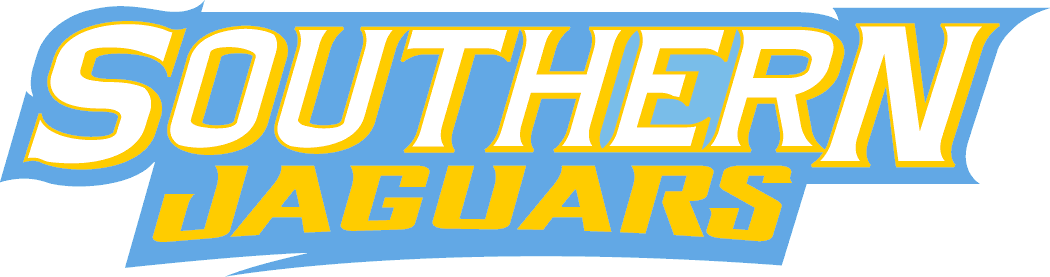
- Conference: Southwestern Athletic Conference
- West Division
- Record: 7–4 (5–2 SWAC)
- Head coach: Dawson Odums (5th season)
- Offensive coordinator: Chennis Berry (5th season)
- Defensive coordinator: Trei Oliver (2nd season)
- Home stadium: Ace W. Mumford Stadium

2017 Southwestern Athletic Conference football standings
	Conf.			Overall
Team	W		L	W		L
East Division
Alcorn State xy	5	–	2	7	–	5
Alabama State	4	–	3	5	–	6
Alabama A&M	3	–	4	4	–	7
Jackson State	3	–	4	3	–	8
Mississippi Valley State	1	–	6	2	–	9
West Division
No. 16 Grambling State xy$	7	–	0	11	–	2
Southern	5	–	2	7	–	4
Prairie View A&M	4	–	3	6	–	5
Texas Southern	2	–	5	2	–	9
Arkansas–Pine Bluff	1	–	6	2	–	9
Championship: Grambling State 40, Alcorn State 32
$ – Conference champion; x – Division champion/co-champions; y – Championship game participant; Rankings from STATS Poll

The 2017 Southern Jaguars football team represented Southern University in the 2017 NCAA Division I FCS football season. The Jaguars were led by fifth-year head coach Dawson Odums and played their home games at Ace W. Mumford Stadium in Baton Rouge, Louisiana as members of the West Division of the Southwestern Athletic Conference (SWAC). They finished the season 7–4, 5–2 in SWAC play to finish in second place in the West Division.

Due to NCAA APR violations, the Jaguars were ineligible to participate in the SWAC Championship or the Celebration Bowl.

== Preseason ==
The Jaguars were picked to finish in second place in the Western Division.

== Schedule ==
Date	Time	Opponent	Site	TV	Result	Attendance	Source
September 3	1:30 p.m.	South Carolina State*	Ace W. Mumford Stadium; Baton Rouge, LA (MEAC/SWAC Challenge)	ESPN2	W 14–8	10,006	
September 9	6:00 p.m.	at Southern Miss*	M. M. Roberts Stadium; Hattiesburg, MS	STADIUM	L 0–45	24,337	
September 16	6:00 p.m.	at UTSA*	Alamodome; San Antonio, TX		L 17–51	25,093	
September 23	6:00 p.m.	at Alcorn State	Casem-Spinks Stadium; Lorman, MS		L 31–48	23,738	
September 30	6:00 p.m.	Fort Valley State*	Ace W. Mumford Stadium; Baton Rouge, LA		W 31–14	12,958	
October 7	6:00 p.m.	Alabama A&M^{†}	Ace W. Mumford Stadium; Baton Rouge, LA		W 35–14	15,279	
October 21	6:00 p.m.	at Jackson State	Mississippi Veterans Memorial Stadium; Jackson, MS (rivalry)		W 35–17	14,000	
October 28	4:00 p.m.	vs. Arkansas–Pine Bluff	War Memorial Stadium; Little Rock, AR		W 47–40	16,760	
November 4	4:00 p.m.	Prairie View A&M	Ace W. Mumford Stadium; Baton Rouge, LA		W 37–31	13,085	
November 11	5:00 p.m.	at Texas Southern	BBVA Compass Stadium; Houston, TX	AT&T SW	W 33–7	12,427	
November 25	4:00 p.m.	vs. Grambling State	Mercedes-Benz Superdome; New Orleans, LA (Bayou Classic)	NBCSN	L 21–30	66,650	
*Non-conference game; ^{†}Homecoming; All times are in Central time
