= Armed Forces Bowl =

College football bowl game

- Lockheed Martin Armed Forces Bowl
- Stadium: Amon G. Carter Stadium
- Location: Fort Worth, Texas
- Previous stadiums: Gerald J. Ford Stadium (2010–2011)
- Previous locations: University Park, Texas (2010–2011)
- Operated: 2003–present
- Conference tie-ins: Big 12 (2014, 2016, 2018); Big Ten (2015, 2017, 2019); American (2014, 2018); MWC (2015, 2019); Navy (2016); Army (2017)
- Payout: US$1.35 million (2019 season)
- Website: armedforcesbowl.com

Sponsors
- PlainsCapital Bank (2003–2004); Bell Helicopter (2006–2013); Lockheed Martin (2014–present)

Former names
- PlainsCapital Fort Worth Bowl (2003–2004); Fort Worth Bowl (2005); Bell Helicopter Armed Forces Bowl (2006–2013)

2026 matchup
- Rice vs. Texas State (Texas State 41–10)

The Armed Forces Bowl, formerly the Fort Worth Bowl from 2003 to 2005, is an annual postseason college football bowl game. First played in 2003, the game is normally held at the 45,000-seat Amon G. Carter Stadium on the campus of Texas Christian University in Fort Worth, Texas. The 2010 and 2011 editions were instead played at Gerald J. Ford Stadium in University Park, Texas, when Amon G. Carter Stadium underwent a reconstruction project. Since 2014, the game has been sponsored by Lockheed Martin and is officially known as the Lockheed Martin Armed Forces Bowl. Previous sponsors include Bell Helicopter (2006–2013) and PlainsCapital Bank (2003–2004).

The contest is one of 14 bowls produced by ESPN Events (previously ESPN Regional Television) and has been televised annually on ESPN since its inception. Armed Forces Insurance is the official Insurance Partner of the Armed Forces Bowl and has sponsored the Great American Patriot Award, presented at halftime at the bowl, since 2006.

== History ==
The bowl was first played in December 2003, featuring two ranked teams, No. 18 Boise State and No. 19 TCU. It was the only edition to include a ranked team (per the AP Poll) until No. 22 Army played in December 2018.

In 2010 and 2011 when Amon G. Carter Stadium underwent a reconstruction project, the bowl was moved to Gerald J. Ford Stadium in nearby University Park, Texas.

Through the December 2024 playing, one of the three FBS-playing service academies (Army, Navy, and Air Force) has appeared in the game 14 times. Contractual tie-ins with the American Conference (home of Army and Navy) and the Mountain West Conference (home of Air Force) assures that one of those schools could appear in the game every year, if bowl-eligible and not already committed to another bowl.

The 2018 game, between Army and Houston, was the first sellout in the bowl's 16-year history.

=== Sponsorship ===
The bowl game was inaugurated in 2003 as the PlainsCapital Fort Worth Bowl, reflecting the sponsorship of PlainsCapital Bank. The bank's sponsorship ended after the 2004 edition, and the 2005 game was staged without corporate sponsorship.

Alltel was to assume the title sponsorship and naming rights to the game beginning in 2006, which would have been titled the Alltel Wireless Bowl to promote its mobile division, but the deal fell through. Instead, Fort Worth-based Bell Helicopter Textron took over sponsorship, and thus the game became officially known as the Bell Helicopter Armed Forces Bowl. The Bell sponsorship ended after the 2013 edition. During this time, the 2010 and 2011 Armed Forces Bowl were held at Gerald J. Ford Stadium on the campus of Southern Methodist University in the Dallas enclave of University Park, while Amon G. Carter Stadium was undergoing a major renovation. The game returned to Amon Carter Stadium in Fort Worth in 2012, after construction on that stadium was completed.

Lockheed Martin became the game's sponsor in 2014. The company has a major presence in the Dallas-Fort Worth Metroplex: the company's Lockheed Martin Aeronautics division is based in Fort Worth while its Lockheed Martin Missiles and Fire Control division is based in nearby Grand Prairie. In December 2018, Lockheed Martin extended its sponsorship though 2025.

== Conference tie-ins ==
The bowl's partnership with the Big 12 Conference ended with the 2005 season. From 2006 to 2009, the Mountain West Conference was signed to provide a team to face either a team from the Pac-10 or Conference USA (C-USA), depending on the year; Pac-10 teams would play in odd number years while C-USA teams would play in even numbered years). As such, the 2006 and 2008 games featured C-USA teams Tulsa and Houston, respectively, whereas California represented the Pac-10 in 2007. The Pac-10 was unable to send a representative to the game in 2009, so C-USA sent Houston to the game for a second consecutive year. In 2010, since the Mountain West did not have enough eligible teams and Army was bowl eligible, Army played SMU in the bowl.

Following the 2013 football season, the Armed Forces Bowl signed multi-year agreements with the American Athletic Conference (The American), Big Ten Conference, Big 12 Conference, Mountain West Conference, Army and Navy to set bowl match-ups for the next six seasons (Navy later joined The American, and Army committed to do so beginning with the 2024 football season).

In December 2020, it was announced that the 2020 game would be played between teams from the Pac-12 and SEC, following cancellation of the ESPN Events-owned Las Vegas Bowl (which would have been featuring those tie-ins for the first time) due to complications relating to the COVID-19 pandemic. However, due to a lack of available teams from the Pac-12, Tulsa of the American Athletic Conference was ultimately selected to face Mississippi State of the SEC.

Season	Planned		Actual	
2014*	The American	Big 12	The American	ACC
2015	Mountain West	Big Ten	Mountain West	Pac-12
2016	Navy	Big 12	Navy	C-USA
2017	Army	Big Ten	Army	Mountain West
2018	The American	Big 12	The American	Army
2019*	Mountain West	Big Ten	The American	C-USA
2020	Pac-12	SEC	The American	SEC

Games marked with an asterisk (*) were played in January of the following calendar year.

== Game results ==
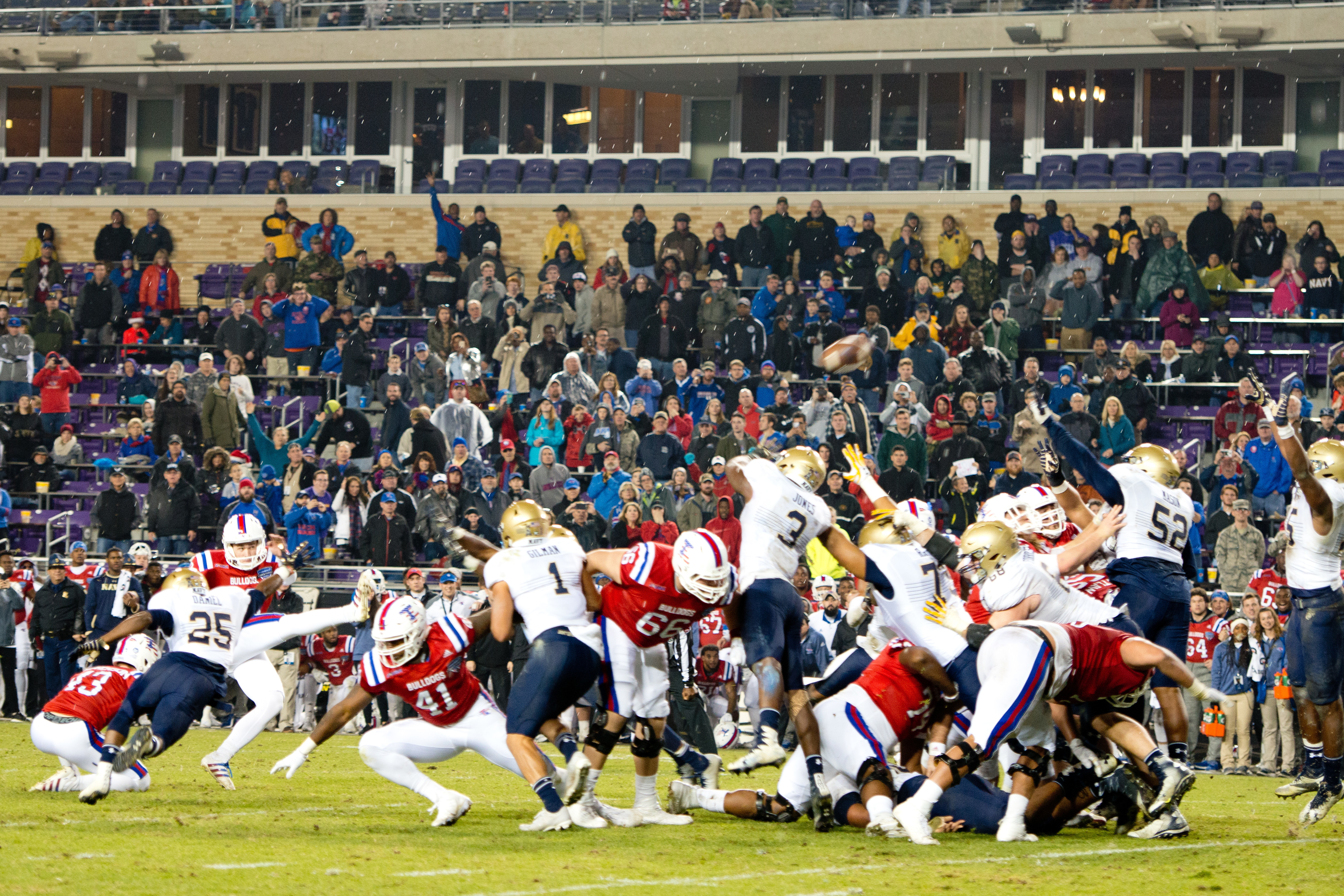
Louisiana Tech kicking a field goal to win the 2016 Armed Forces Bowl

Rankings are based on the AP poll prior to the game being played.

Date played	Bowl name	Winning team		Losing team		Attendance
December 23, 2003	Fort Worth Bowl	18 Boise State	34	19 TCU	31	38,028
December 23, 2004	Fort Worth Bowl	Cincinnati	32	Marshall	14	27,902
December 23, 2005	Fort Worth Bowl	Kansas	42	Houston	13	33,505
December 23, 2006	Armed Forces Bowl	Utah	25	Tulsa	13	32,412
December 31, 2007	Armed Forces Bowl	California	42	Air Force	36	40,905
December 31, 2008	Armed Forces Bowl	Houston	34	Air Force	28	41,127
December 31, 2009	Armed Forces Bowl	Air Force	47	Houston	20	41,414
December 30, 2010	Armed Forces Bowl	Army	16	SMU	14	36,742
December 30, 2011	Armed Forces Bowl	BYU	24	Tulsa	21	30,258
December 29, 2012	Armed Forces Bowl	Rice	33	Air Force	14	40,754
December 30, 2013	Armed Forces Bowl	Navy	24	Middle Tennessee	6	39,246
January 2, 2015	Armed Forces Bowl	Houston	35	Pittsburgh	34	37,888
December 29, 2015	Armed Forces Bowl	California	55	Air Force	36	38,915
December 23, 2016	Armed Forces Bowl	Louisiana Tech	48	Navy	45	40,542
December 23, 2017	Armed Forces Bowl	Army	42	San Diego State	35	35,986
December 22, 2018	Armed Forces Bowl	22 Army	70	Houston	14	44,738
January 4, 2020	Armed Forces Bowl	Tulane	30	Southern Miss	13	38,513
December 31, 2020	Armed Forces Bowl	Mississippi State	28	22 Tulsa	26	9,000
December 22, 2021	Armed Forces Bowl	Army	24	Missouri	22	34,888
December 22, 2022	Armed Forces Bowl	Air Force	30	Baylor	15	43,875
December 23, 2023	Armed Forces Bowl	Air Force	31	24 James Madison	21	30,828
December 27, 2024	Armed Forces Bowl	Navy	21	Oklahoma	20	50,754
January 2, 2026	Armed Forces Bowl	Texas State	41	Rice	10	28,243

== MVPs ==
From inception through the 2022 edition, an MVP was named for each team. Starting with the 2023 game, only a single MVP has been named.

Date	Winning team MVP			Losing team MVP		
Date	Player	Team	Position	Player	Team	Position
December 23, 2003	Ryan Dinwiddie	Boise State	QB	Brandon Hassell	TCU	QB
December 23, 2004	Gino Guidugli	Cincinnati	QB	Josh Davis	Marshall	WR
December 23, 2005	Jason Swanson	Kansas	QB	Kevin Kolb	Houston	QB
December 23, 2006	Louie Sakoda	Utah	P/K	Paul Smith	Tulsa	QB
December 31, 2007	Kevin Riley	California	QB	Shaun Carney	Air Force	QB
December 31, 2008	Bryce Beall	Houston	RB	Jared Tew	Air Force	FB
December 31, 2009	Asher Clark	Air Force	RB	Tyron Carrier	Houston	WR
December 30, 2010	Stephen Anderson	Army	LB	Darius Johnson	SMU	WR
December 30, 2011	Cody Hoffman	BYU	WR	Dexter McCoil	Tulsa	DB
December 29, 2012	Jordan Taylor	Rice	WR	Austin Niklaas	Air Force	LB
December 30, 2013	Keenan Reynolds	Navy	QB	T. T. Barber	Middle Tennessee	LB
January 2, 2015	Kenneth Farrow	Houston	RB	Chad Voytik	Pittsburgh	QB
December 29, 2015	Jared Goff	California	QB	Karson Roberts	Air Force	QB
December 23, 2016	Trent Taylor	Louisiana Tech	WR	Zach Abey	Navy	QB
December 23, 2017	Ahmad Bradshaw	Army	QB	Rashaad Penny	San Diego State	RB
December 22, 2018	Kelvin Hopkins Jr.	Army	QB	Romello Brooker	Houston	TE
January 4, 2020	Justin McMillan	Tulane	QB	Quez Watkins	Southern Miss	WR
December 31, 2020	Lideatrick Griffin	Mississippi State	WR/KR	Christian Williams	Tulsa	DB
December 22, 2021	Arik Smith	Army	LB	Brady Cook	Missouri	QB
December 22, 2022	Haaziq Daniels	Air Force	QB	Dillon Doyle	Baylor	LB
December 23, 2023	Emmanuel Michel	Air Force	RB			
December 27, 2024	Blake Horvath	Navy	QB			
January 2, 2026	Brad Jackson	Texas State	QB			

== Most appearances ==
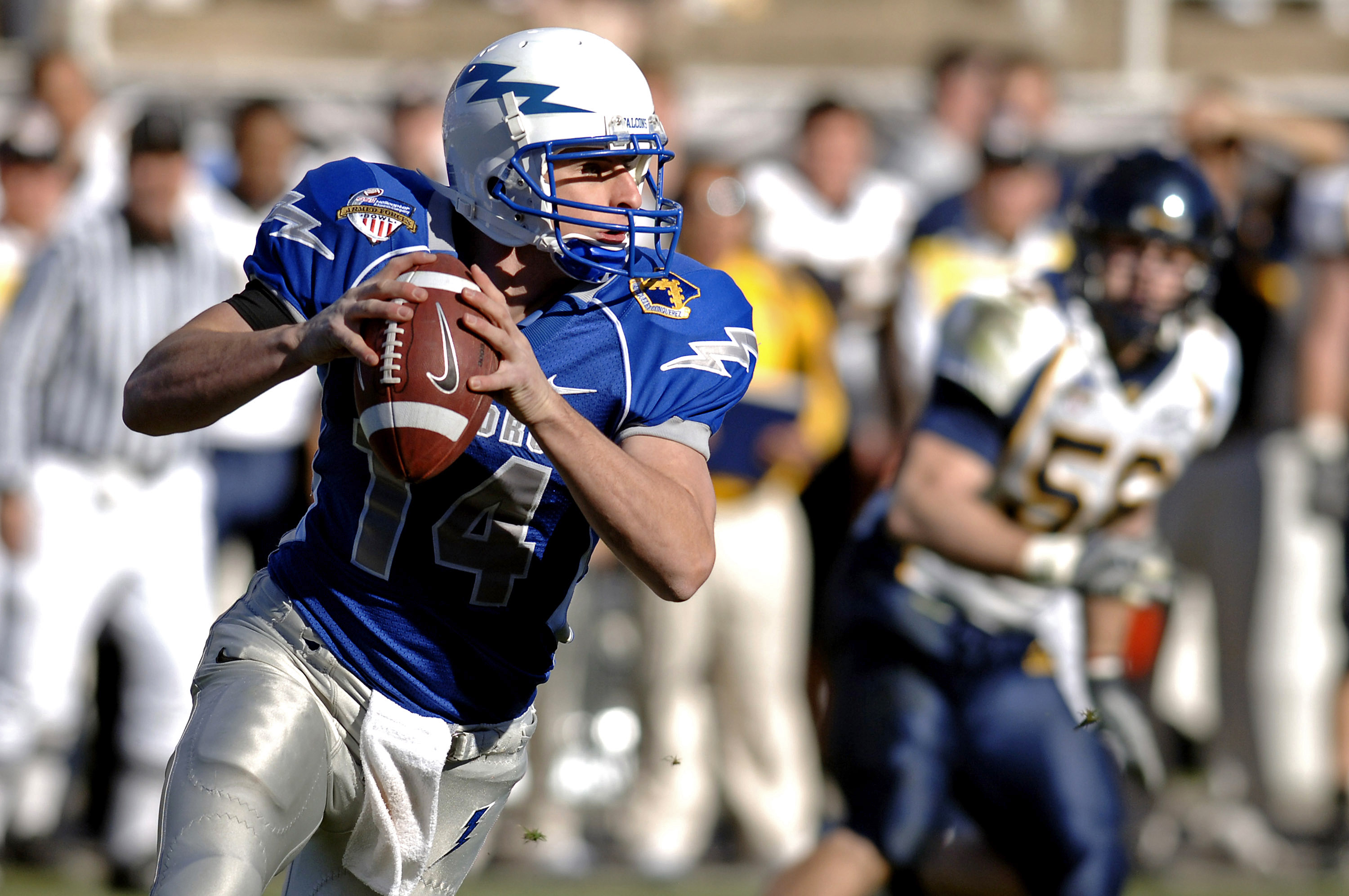
Air Force Falcons quarterback Shea Smith in the 2007 Armed Forces Bowl

Updated through the January 2026 edition (23 games, 46 total appearances).

Teams with multiple appearances

Rank	Team	Appearances	Record	Win pct.
1	Air Force	7	3–4	.429
2	Houston	5	2–3	.400
3	Army	4	4–0	1.000
4	Navy	3	2–1	.667
4	Tulsa	3	0–3	.000
6	California	2	2–0	1.000
6	Rice	2	1–1	.500

Teams with a single appearance

Won (9): Boise State, BYU, Cincinnati, Kansas, Louisiana Tech, Mississippi State, Texas State, Tulane, Utah
Lost (11): Baylor, James Madison, Marshall, Middle Tennessee, Missouri, Oklahoma, Pittsburgh, San Diego State, SMU, Southern Miss, TCU

== Appearances by conference ==
Updated through the January 2026 edition (23 games, 46 total appearances).

Conference	Record				Appearances by season	
Conference	Games	W	L	Win pct.	Won	Lost
CUSA	12	4	8	.333	2004, 2008, 2012, 2016	2003, 2005, 2006, 2009, 2010, 2011, 2013, 2019*
Mountain West	9	4	5	.444	2006, 2009, 2022, 2023	2007, 2008, 2012, 2015, 2017
American	7	3	4	.429	2014*, 2019*, 2024	2016, 2018, 2020, 2025*
Independents	6	6	0	1.000	2010, 2011, 2013, 2017, 2018, 2021	
SEC	3	1	2	.333	2020	2021, 2024
Pac-12	2	2	0	1.000	2007, 2015	
Big 12	2	1	1	.500	2005	2022
Sun Belt	2	1	1	.500	2025*	2023
WAC	1	1	0	1.000	2003	
ACC	1	0	1	.000		2014*
MAC	1	0	1	.000		2004

- Games marked with an asterisk (*) were played in January of the following calendar year.
- Pac-12 record includes appearances when the conference was known as the Pac-10 (before 2011).
- The WAC no longer sponsors FBS football.
- Independent appearances: Army (2010, 2017, 2018, 2021), BYU (2011), Navy (2013)

== Game records ==
Team	Record, Team vs. Opponent	Year
Most points scored (one team)	70, Army vs. Houston	2018
Most points scored (losing team)	45, Navy vs. Louisiana Tech	2016
Most points scored (both teams)	93, Louisiana Tech (48) vs. Navy (45)	2016
Fewest points allowed	6, Navy vs. Middle Tennessee	2013
Largest margin of victory	56, Army (70) vs. Houston (14)	2018
Total yards	592, Army vs. Houston	2018
Rushing yards	507, Army vs. Houston	2018
Passing yards	467, California vs. Air Force	Dec. 2015
First downs	31, shared by: Louisiana Tech vs. Navy; Army vs. San Diego State	2016; 2017
Fewest yards allowed	134, Cincinnati vs. Marshall	2004
Fewest rushing yards allowed	–3, Cincinnati vs. Marshall	2004
Fewest passing yards allowed	6, San Diego State vs. Army	2017
Individual	Record, Player, Team	Year
Total yards	451, Jared Goff (California)	2015
Touchdowns (all-purpose)	5, Kelvin Hopkins Jr. (Army)	2018
Rushing yards	221, Rashaad Penny (San Diego State)	2017
Rushing touchdowns	5, Kelvin Hopkins Jr. (Army)	2018
Passing yards	467, Jared Goff (California)	Dec. 2015
Passing touchdowns	6, Jared Goff (California)	Dec. 2015
Receiving yards	233, Trent Taylor (Louisiana Tech)	2016
Receptions	12, Trent Taylor (Louisiana Tech)	2016
Receiving touchdowns	3, most recently: Kenny Lawler (California)	Dec. 2015
Tackles	23, Marcus McGraw (Houston)	2009
Sacks	3.5, James Nachtigal (Army)	2018
Interceptions	3, Anthony Wright (Air Force)	2009
Long Plays	Record, Player, Team vs. Opponent	Year
Touchdown run	95 yds., Blake Horvath (Navy)	2024
Touchdown pass	69 yds., Brad Jackson to Beau Sparks (Texas State)	2026
Kickoff return	100 yds., Jonathan Warzeka (Air Force)	2009
Punt return	85 yds., Brian Murph (Kansas)	2005
Interception return	90 yds., Emmanuel Forbes (Mississippi State)	Dec. 2020
Fumble return	55 yds., Josh McNary (Army)	2010
Punt	70 yds., Riley Riethman (Navy)	2024
Field goal	52 yds., Chris Blewitt (Pittsburgh)	Jan. 2015

== Media coverage ==
The bowl has been televised on ESPN since its inception. Radio coverage was initially on ESPN Radio, and is currently carried nationally via Bowl Season Radio.
