= 2017 Armed Forces Bowl =

American college football game

2017 Lockheed Martin Armed Forces Bowl
- 15th Armed Forces Bowl
San Diego State Aztecs	Army Black Knights
(10–2)	(9–3)
Mountain West Conference	Independent
35	42
Head coach: Rocky Long	Head coach: Jeff Monken
	1	2	3	4	Total
San Diego State	7	14	7	7	35
Army	7	14	0	21	42
- Date: December 23, 2017
- Season: 2017
- Stadium: Amon G. Carter Stadium
- Location: Fort Worth, Texas
- MVP: Ahmad Bradshaw (QB, Army) & Rashaad Penny (RB, San Diego State)
- Referee: Ron Snodgrass (Big Ten)
- Attendance: 35,986

United States TV coverage
- Network: ESPN
- Announcers: Adam Amin, Mack Brown, Paul Carcaterra

The 2017 Armed Forces Bowl was a college football bowl game played on December 23, 2017, at Amon G. Carter Stadium on the campus of Texas Christian University in Fort Worth, Texas. The fifteenth edition of the Armed Forces Bowl featured the Army Black Knights against the San Diego State Aztecs of the Mountain West Conference. Kickoff was scheduled for 2:30 p.m. CST and the game aired on ESPN. It was one of the 2017–18 bowl games concluding the 2017 FBS football season. The game was officially named the Lockheed Martin Armed Forces Bowl after its corporate sponsor Lockheed Martin.

== Teams ==
The game featured the Army Black Knights against the San Diego State Aztecs.

This was the third time that Army and San Diego State played each other; the Aztecs won both previous meetings, defeating the Black Knights by a score of 23–20 in West Point on September 10, 2011, and then again on September 8, 2012, this time by a score of 42–7 in San Diego.

=== Army Black Knights ===
For 2017, Army had reached a contractual agreement to play in the 2017 Armed Forces Bowl should they be bowl-eligible that season and not selected for a New Year's Six bowl game. Immediately following their 31–28 overtime win over Temple to become bowl-eligible, the Black Knights officially accepted their invitation.

This was the Black Knights' second Armed Forces Bowl, following their victory over the SMU Mustangs in the 2010 Armed Forces Bowl by a score of 16–14.

=== San Diego State Aztecs ===
This was the Aztecs' first Armed Forces Bowl.

== Game summary ==
=== Scoring Summary ===
Scoring summary

Quarter	Time	Drive			Team	Scoring information	Score	
Quarter	Time	Plays	Yards	TOP	Team	Scoring information	SDSU	ARMY
1	13:36	3	73	1:22	SDSU	Rashaad Penny 81-yard touchdown run, John Baron II kick good	7	0
1	2:13	8	70	4:09	ARMY	Ahmad Bradshaw 19-yard touchdown run, Blake Wilson kick good	7	7
2	14:52	5	70	2:21	SDSU	Rashaad Penny 32-yard touchdown run, John Baron II kick good	14	7
2	7:50	12	74	7:02	ARMY	Darnell Woolfolk 7-yard touchdown run, Blake Wilson kick good	14	14
2	0:18	13	53	5:55	ARMY	Andy Davidson 4-yard touchdown run, Blake Wilson kick good	14	21
2	0:05	0	0	0:13	SDSU	Juwan Washington 78-yard touchdown run, John Baron II kick good	21	21
3	1:49	4	72	1:52	SDSU	Rashaad Penny 49-yard touchdown run, John Baron kick good	28	21
4	9:25	10	79	4:47	ARMY	Ahmad Bradshaw 27-yard touchdown run, Blake Wilson kick good	28	28
4	5:47	7	44	3:38	SDSU	Rashaad Penny 4-yard touchdown run, John Baron II kick good	35	28
4	0:18	15	72	5:29	ARMY	Darnell Woolfolk 1-yard touchdown run, 2-point run good	35	36
4	0:00	2	-11	0:18	ARMY	Fumble recovery returned 29 yards for touchdown by Elijah Riley, kick not taken	35	42
"TOP" = time of possession. For other American football terms, see Glossary of American football.							35	42

=== Statistics ===
	1	2	3	4	Total
Aztecs	7	14	7	7	35
Black Knights	7	14	0	21	42

Statistics	SDSU	Army
First downs	11	31
Total offense, plays-yards	31–280	91–446
Rushes-yards (net)	21–255	87–440
Passing yards (net)	25	6
Passes, Comp-Att-Int	6–10–1	1–4–1
Time of Possession	14:00	46:00

Team	Category	Player	Statistics
San Diego State	Passing	Christian Chapman	6/10, 25 yds, 1 INT
San Diego State	Rushing	Rashaad Penny	14 car, 221 yds, 4 TD
San Diego State	Receiving	Fred Trevillion	3 rec, 34 yds
Army	Passing	Ahmad Bradshaw	1/3, 6 yds
Army	Rushing	Ahmad Bradshaw	32 car, 180 yds, 2 TD
Army	Receiving	Camden Harrison	1 rec, 6 yds
