= Ahmad Bradshaw (quarterback) =

American football quarterback

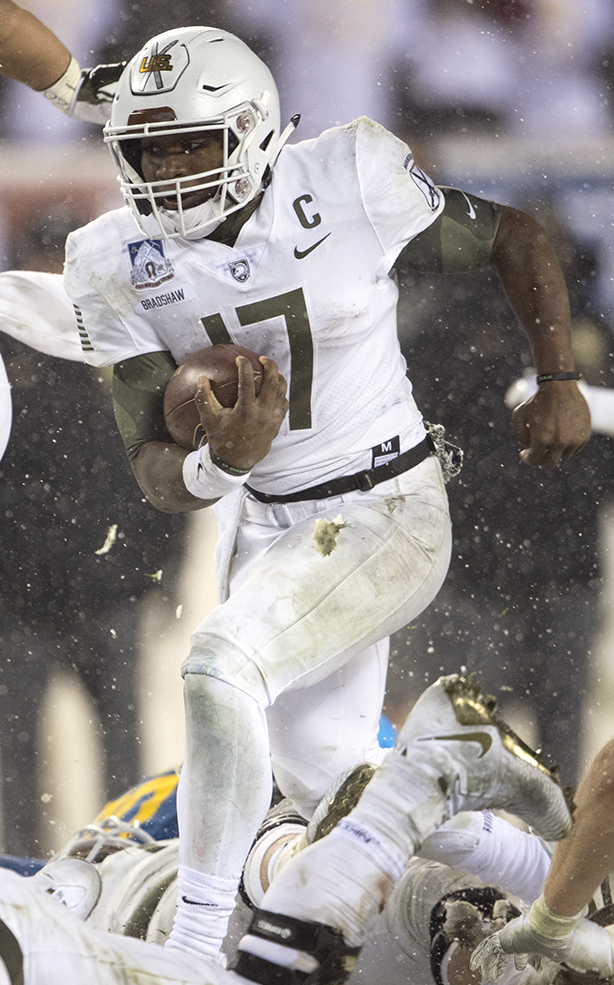
- Bradshaw with Army in 2017

No. 17
- Position: Quarterback

Personal information
- Born: Chicago, Illinois, U.S.
- Listed height: 5 ft 11 in (1.80 m)
- Listed weight: 205 lb (93 kg)

Career information
- High school: Gwendolyn Brooks
- College: Army (2014–2017)
- Stats at ESPN

Ahmad Ali Bradshaw is an American former college football player who was a quarterback for the Army Black Knights from 2014 to 2017. He was the MVP of the 2016 Heart of Dallas Bowl and the co-MVP of the 2017 Armed Forces Bowl.

== Football career ==
Before committing to West Point, Bradshaw was recruited by Illinois, Michigan, and Northwestern, who all asked him about switching to cornerback. At West Point, Bradshaw was a three-year starter at quarterback. Before the start of the 2016 season, Bradshaw abruptly left the program, but later returned. At the end of the 2017 Army Black Knights football season, Bradshaw had rushed for a service academy record 1,746 yards and 14 touchdowns, helping Army to a 10–3 season and their first Commander in Chief's Trophy since 1996. Bradshaw became the first Army quarterback since Ronnie McAda to beat Navy in back-to-back seasons.

=== Statistics ===
Year	Team	Games			Passing								Rushing			
Year	Team	GP	GS	Record	Cmp	Att	Pct	Yds	Avg	TD	Int	Rtg	Att	Yds	Avg	TD
2014	Army	0	0	—	DNP											
2015	Army	8	7	2−5	23	48	47.9	429	8.9	5	2	149.0	130	468	3.6	5
2016	Army	12	12	8−4	40	91	44.0	703	7.7	4	9	103.6	185	826	4.5	8
2017	Army	13	13	10−3	14	43	32.6	285	6.6	1	2	86.6	242	1,746	7.2	14
Career		33	32	20−12	77	182	42.3	1,417	7.8	10	13	111.6	557	3,040	5.5	27

== Controversy ==
Bradshaw was accused of rape by a female cadet in September 2014. After an internal investigation, West Point concluded that the allegations were "unfounded".

Controversially, Bradshaw was still allowed to remain a member of the football team despite being in violation of the Cadet Code of Honor.
