= 2017 Army Black Knights football team =

American college football season

2017 Army Black Knights football

ECAC Division I FBS Team of the Year Armed Forces Bowl champion

Armed Forces Bowl, W 42–35 vs. San Diego State
- Conference: Independent
- Record: 10–3
- Head coach: Jeff Monken (4th season)
- Offensive coordinator: Brent Davis (4th season)
- Offensive scheme: Triple option
- Defensive coordinator: Jay Bateman (4th season)
- Base defense: 3–4
- Captains: Ahmad Bradshaw; John Voit
- Home stadium: Michie Stadium

2017 NCAA Division I FBS independents football records
	Conf.			Overall
Team	W		L	W		L
Army		–		10	–	3
No. 11 Notre Dame		–		10	–	3
UMass		–		4	–	8
BYU		–		4	–	9
Rankings from AP Poll

The 2017 Army Black Knights football team represented the United States Military Academy as an independent in the 2017 NCAA Division I FBS football season. The Black Knights were led by fourth-year head coach Jeff Monken and played their home games at Michie Stadium finished the season 10–3, winning the Commander-in-Chief's Trophy for the first time since 1996 after sweeping service academy rivals Air Force and Navy. They were invited to the Armed Forces Bowl where they defeated San Diego State. Following the season, they were chosen as the 2017 ECAC Division I Football Subdivision Team of the Year.

== Personnel ==
=== Roster ===
2017 Army Black Knights roster
Quarterbacks: 4 Cam Thomas, Freshman; 7 Chris Carter, Junior; 8 Kelvin Hopkins, Sophomore; 9 Luke Langdon, Junior; 13 Christian Anderson, Freshman; 17 Ahmad Bradshaw, Senior; Running backs: 2 Jordan Soper-Johnson, Freshman; 3 Jordan Asberry, Junior; 5 Kell Walker, Sophomore; 6 John Trainor, Senior; 10 Jordan Blackman, Freshman; 16 Malik Hancock, Sophomore; 21 T.J Wisham, Freshman; 23 Kevin Hicks, Sophomore; 26 Donovan Franklin, Sophomore; 27 Fred Cooper, Freshman; 29 Zack Boobas, Freshman; 30 Dominic Distefano, Freshman; 32 Artice Hobbs IV, Freshman; 36 Sandon McCoy, Freshman; 38 Donnell Diego, Freshman; 39 Parker Ross, Freshman; 43 DJ Miller, Freshman; 44 Chambo Liddell-Patacsil, Freshman; Fullbacks: 22 Calen Holt, Junior; 25 Connor Slomka, Sophomore; 33 Darnell Woolfolk, Junior; 40 Andy Davidson, Junior; Offensive lineman: 42 Austen Ferbet, Freshman; 50 Will Schumacher, Freshman; 52 Weston Jones, Freshman; 53 Jeff Panara, Junior; 54 Josh Rea, Junior; 55 J.B Hunter IV, Freshman; 56 Caden Williams, Freshman; 57 Ethan Palelei, Junior; 58 Liam McCarthy, Sophomore; 59 Mike Johnson, Sophomore; 60 Alex Herndon, Sophomore; 60 Ryan O'Malley, Freshman; 62 Rick Kurz, Junior; 63 Jake Baumert, Sophomore; 64 Mike Owens, Sophomore; 64 Kenny Willoughby, Freshman; 65 Bryce Holland, Senior; 66 Joshua Boylan, Senior; 67 Tyler Fleagle, Freshman; 67 Jack Owens, Freshman; 69 Grant Kerstens, Sophomore; 69 Daniel McGeough, Freshman; 70 Mike Houghton, Senior; 73 Jaxson Deaton, Sophomore; 74 Austin Schuffert, Junior; 75 Jack Sides, Sophomore; 76 Peyton Reeder, Freshman; 77 Noah Utley, Sophomore; 78 Brett Toth, Senior; 79 Luke McCleery, Freshman; 79 Cooper Simpson, Sophomore	Tight ends: 46 Geoff Kirk, Freshman; 47 Jake Lauer, Freshman; 49 Michel Toure, Sophomore; 72 Trey Neville, Sophomore; 83 Zach Saum, Junior; 85 Quinten Parker, Junior; 94 Will Huff, Sophomore; Wide receivers: 14 Jonathan Hamilton, Freshman; 15 Max Weisman, Freshman; 19 Kevin Waites, Freshman; 31 Chris Gregg, Sophomore; 80 Glen Coates, Sophomore; 81 Jeff Ejekam, Senior; 82 Kjetil Cline, Sophomore; 84 Jermaine Adams, Senior; 86 Christian Hayes, Sophomore; 87 Jake Carlson, Freshman; 88 Camden Harrison, Freshman; 89 Tommy Upton, Freshman; Defensive line: 13 Markus Wright, Freshman; 38 August Cook, Freshman; 42 Amadeo West, Sophomore; 52 Juwan Griffith-James, Junior; 58 Andrew McLean, Senior; 59 John Voit, Senior; 62 Michael Gerber, Freshman; 63 Jon King, Freshman; 65 Ted Wages IV, Freshman; 66 Trevor Hallock, Freshman; 68 Alex Crawford, Freshman; 71 Nick Stokes, Freshman; 76 Mackay Phillips, Freshman; 77 Raymond Wright, Junior; 84 Harrison Greenhill, Freshman; 86 Edriece Patterson, Freshman; 87 Jack Hough, Freshman; 89 Emmanuel Aka, Junior; 90 Karl Holler, Freshman; 91 Wunmi Oyetuga, Junior; 92 Rahmeel Cook, Freshman; 93 Rod Stoddard II, Sophomore; 94 Luke Blanton, Freshman; 95 Emmanuel Ukhueligbe, Freshman; 96 Julian Meares, Sophomore; 97 Demann Wilson, Freshman; 98 Nicholas Slusher, Freshman; 98 Connor Smith, Freshman; 99 Cordarrell Davis, Junior	Linebackers: 11 Donavan Lynch, Sophomore; 15 Ryan Parker, Sophomore; 18 Jake Ellington, Sophomore; 19 James Nachtigal, Junior; 21 Alex Aukerman, Senior; 22 Christian Gomez, Freshman; 29 Chandler Ramirez, Junior; 30 Hayden Haupt, Sophomore; 31 Joe Stephenson, Freshman; 34 Jeremiah Lowery, Freshman; 36 Scott Washle, Senior; 37 Aaron Jones, Freshman; 39 Kieren Douglas, Freshman; 40 Ben Roth, Freshman; 43 Jacquese Steen, Sophomore; 44 Jarrod Jones, Junior; 45 Gavin Bassett, Freshman; 47 Jon Rhattigan, Freshman; 50 Bayle Wolf, Senior; 51 Joe Ryan, Sophomore; 53 Ryan Grady III, Sophomore; 54 Cole Christiansen, Sophomore; 55 Matt Sannella, Senior; 56 Kenneth Brinson, Junior; 57 Jacob Covington, Sophomore; 85 Josh Thomas, Freshman; Defensive backs: 1 Marcus Hyatt, Junior; 2 James Gibson, Junior; 3 Taylor Vessel, Freshman; 4 Max Regan, Junior; 5 Ryan Velez, Sophomore; 6 Dean Ngendakuriyo, Freshman; 6 Ke'Shaun Wells, Freshman; 7 Jaylon McClinton, Sophomore; 8 Rhyan England, Senior; 9 Justin Thomas, Freshman; 10 Mike Reynolds, Junior; 14 Jalen Sharp, Junior; 16 Jordan Lane, Freshman; 17 Joe King V, Freshman; 20 Cameron Jones, Sophomore; 23 Elijah Riley, Sophomore; 25 Javhari Bourdeau, Freshman; 26 Richard Hanson, Sophomore; 27 Wallace Barrett, Freshman; 32 Zach Scott, Junior; 33 Alex Rowe II, Freshman; 33 Bryson Stephens, Freshman; 34 Rashaad Bolton, Sophomore; 34 Jack King, Sophomore; 36 Chris Skyers, Freshman; Kickers: 18 Blake Wilson, Senior; 21 Camden Bauman, Freshman; 31 John Abercrombie, Junior; 38 Nick Schrage, Junior; 95 Sean McNulty, Freshman; 96 Billy Mitchell, Freshman; 97 David Cooper, Sophomore; 98 Michael Leisle, Freshman; 99 Landon Salyers, Freshman; Punters: 17 Zach Potter, Sophomore; 34 J.D Mote, Junior; Long snappers: 40 Paul Lawless, Freshman; 45 Caleb McKee, Freshman; 48 Kyle O'Connor, Freshman; 89 Scott Flanick, Junior

=== Coaching staff ===
Name	Position
Jeff Monken	Head coach
Jay Bateman	Defensive coordinator/Assistant head coach
Brent Davis	Offensive coordinator/offensive line
Josh Christian-Young	Cornerbacks
Kevin Corless	Inside Linebackers
Daryl Dixon	Outside Linebackers
John Loose	Safeties
Sean Saturnio	Special teams coordinator
Todd Spencer	Offensive Line
Mike Viti	Fullbacks
Mitch Ware	Quarterbacks
David Corley Jr.	Wide Receivers
Tucker Waugh	Running backs
Chad Wilt	Defensive Line
Pat Tresey	Offensive Quality Control
Aairon Savage	Defensive Quality Control
Brian Hess	Head football strength and conditioning coach
Jansen Petagna	Director of player personnel
Scott Swanson	Director of strength and conditioning
Dan McCarthy	Director of football operations
CPT Max Jenkins	Director of player development

== Schedule ==
Date	Time	Opponent	Site	TV	Result	Attendance
September 1	6:00 p.m.	No. 22 (FCS) Fordham	Michie Stadium; West Point, NY	CBSSN	W 64–6	22,333
September 9	12:00 p.m.	Buffalo	Michie Stadium; West Point, NY	CBSSN	W 21–17	24,017
September 16	4:30 p.m.	at No. 8 Ohio State	Ohio Stadium; Columbus, OH	FOX	L 7–38	108,414
September 23	12:00 p.m.	at Tulane	Yulman Stadium; New Orleans, LA	CBSSN	L 17–21	16,643
September 30	3:30 p.m.	UTEP	Michie Stadium; West Point, NY	CBSSN	W 35–21	31,133
October 7	6:30 p.m.	at Rice	Rice Stadium; Houston, TX	beIN	W 49–12	21,766
October 14	12:00 p.m.	Eastern Michigan	Michie Stadium; West Point, NY	CBSSN	W 28–27	34,333
October 21	12:00 p.m.	Temple	Michie Stadium; West Point, NY	CBSSN	W 31–28 ^{OT}	34,876
November 4	3:30 p.m.	at Air Force	Falcon Stadium; Colorado Springs, CO (Commander-in-Chief's Trophy)	CBSSN	W 21–0	41,875
November 11	12:00 p.m.	Duke	Michie Stadium; West Point, NY	CBSSN	W 21–16	38,851
November 18	6:30 p.m.	at North Texas	Apogee Stadium; Denton, TX	beIN	L 49–52	26,392
December 9	3:00 p.m.	vs. Navy	Lincoln Financial Field; Philadelphia, PA (Army–Navy Game, Commander-in-Chief's Trophy, College GameDay)	CBS	W 14–13	68,625
December 23	3:30 p.m.	vs. San Diego State	Amon G. Carter Stadium; Fort Worth, TX (Armed Forces Bowl)	ESPN	W 42–35	35,986
Rankings from AP Poll released prior to the game; All times are in Eastern time

== Game summaries ==
=== Fordham ===
Fordham Rams at Army Black Knights

Quarter	1	2	3	4	Total
Rams	0	6	0	0	6
Black Knights	21	13	17	13	64

at Michie Stadium, West Point, New York

- Date: September 1, 2017
- Game time: 6:00 p.m. EDT
- Game weather: Temperature: 67 F • Wind: NW 7 mph
- Game attendance: 22,333
- Referee: Matt Overton
- TV announcers (CBSSN): Ben Holden (Play-by-play), Jay Feely (color) & John Schriffen (sideline)
- ESPN – Army: 513 yards, no completions in opening win /// Box Score, Fordham at Army

Game information

First Quarter

- (13:30) ARMY TD: Darnell Woolfolk 39-yard rush (Blake Wilson kick); 2 plays, 44 yards, 0:43
- (08:41) ARMY TD: John Trainor 13-yard rush (Blake Wilson kick); 8 plays, 54 yards, 3:38
- (00:39) ARMY TD: Ahmad Bradshaw 1-yard rush (Blake Wilson kick); 4 plays, 18 yards, 1:58

Second Quarter

- (07:40) ARMY TD: Jalen Sharp 75-yard blocked field goal return (Blake Wilson kick)
- (03:13) FORDHAM TD: Chase Edmonds 6-yard rush (Kyle Facibene kick blocked); 10 plays, 79 yards, 4:13
- (02:48) ARMY TD: Ahmad Bradshaw 71-yard rush (Ahmad Bradshaw pass failed); 1 play, 71 yards, 0:17

Third Quarter

- (11:33) ARMY FG: Blake Wilson 30-yard field goal; 8 plays, 58 yards, 3:18
- (09:41) ARMY TD: Andy Davidson 1-yard rush (John Abercrombie kick); 2 plays, 11 yards, 0:41
- (04:02) ARMY TD: Fred Cooper 5-yard rush (Landon Salyers kick); 7 plays, 50 yards, 3:49

Fourth Quarter

- (10:37) ARMY TD: Artice Hobbs 18-yard rush (David Cooper kick blocked); 5 plays, 67 yards, 2:47
- (01:25) ARMY TD: Zach Boobas 12-yard rush (John Abercrombie kick); 9 plays, 68 yards, 6:10

Passing

- FORDHAM – Kevin Anderson: 26/38, 233 yds, 1 INT
- ARMY – Ahmad Bradshaw: 0/2, 0 yds

Rushing

- FORDHAM – Chase Edmonds: 15 att, 42 yds, 1 TD
- ARMY – Ahmad Bradshaw: 9 att, 177 yds, 2 TD

Receiving

- FORDHAM – Jonathan Lumley: 8 rec, 72 yds
- ARMY – No Receptions

=== Buffalo ===
Buffalo Bulls at Army Black Knights

Quarter	1	2	3	4	Total
Bulls	3	14	0	0	17
Black Knights	7	0	0	14	21

at Michie Stadium, West Point, New York

- Date: September 9, 2017
- Game time: 12:00 p.m. EDT
- Game weather: Temperature: 63 F • Wind: NNW 8 mph • Weather: Mostly cloudy
- Game attendance: 24,017
- Referee: David Epperley
- TV announcers (CBSSN): Ben Holden (Play-by-play), Jay Feely (color) & John Schriffen (sideline)
- ESPN – Woolfolk scores 2 TDs in 4th, Army beats Buffalo 21–17 /// Box Score, Buffalo at Army

Game information

First Quarter

- (11:29) UB FG: Adam Mitcheson 21-yard field goal; 8 plays, 73 yards, 3:31
- (06:58) ARMY TD: Ahmad Bradshaw 1-yard rush (Blake Wilson kick); 8 plays, 73 yards, 4:21

Second Quarter

- (14:46) UB TD: Tyree Jackson 75-yard rush (Adam Mitcheson kick); 3 plays, 82 yards, 1:21
- (11:42) UB TD: Antonio Nunn 47-yard pass from Tyree Jackson (Adam Mitcheson kick); 2 plays, 65 yards, 0:44

Third Quarter

no scoring

Fourth Quarter

- (14:44) ARMY TD: Darnell Woolfolk 1-yard rush (Blake Wilson kick); 16 plays, 79 yards, 8:12
- (04:53) ARMY TD: Darnell Woolfolk 1-yard rush (Blake Wilson kick); 13 plays, 66 yards, 7:21

Passing

- UB – Tyree Jackson: 9/16, 193 yds, 1 TD
- ARMY – Ahmad Bradshaw: 2/8, 17 yds

Rushing

- UB – Tyree Jackson: 10 att, 75 yds, 1 TD
- ARMY – Ahmad Bradshaw: 25 att, 147 yds, 1 TD

Receiving

- UB – Anthony Johnson: 3 rec, 82 yds
- ARMY – Jordan Asberry: 1 rec, 18 yds

=== At Ohio State ===
Army Black Knights at #8 Ohio State

Quarter	1	2	3	4	Total
Black Knights	0	7	0	0	7
No. 8 Buckeyes	14	3	14	7	38

at Ohio Stadium, Columbus, Ohio

- Date: September 16, 2017
- Game time: 4:30 p.m. EDT
- Game weather: Temperature: High 70s • Wind: SE 3 mph • Weather: Partly cloudy
- Game attendance: 108,414
- Referee: Mark Kluczynski
- TV announcers (FOX): Joe Davis (Play-by-play), Brady Quinn (color) & Bruce Feldman (sideline)
- ESPN – No. 8 Ohio State bounces back with 38–7 rout of Army /// Box Score, Army vs #8 Ohio State

Game information

First Quarter

- (12:23) OSU TD: J. T. Barrett 5-yard rush (Sean Nuernberger kick); 8 plays, 75 yards, 2:37
- (04:11) OSU TD: J. K. Dobbins 2-yard rush (Sean Nuernberger kick); 13 plays, 94 yards, 4:12

Second Quarter

- (06:25) ARMY TD: Darnell Woolfolk 3-yard rush (Blake Wilson kick); 18 plays, 99 yards, 9:37
- (03:06) OSU FG: Sean Nuernberger 33-yard field goal; 12 plays, 44 yards, 3:13

Third Quarter

- (08:23) OSU TD: J.K. Dobbins 52-yard rush (Sean Nuernberger kick); 2 plays, 74 yards, 0:27
- (05:12) OSU TD: Terry McLaurin 20-yard pass from J.T. Barrett (Sean Nuernberger kick); 4 plays, 64 yards, 1:07

Fourth Quarter

- (07:01) OSU TD: Austin Mack 9-yard pass from J.T. Barrett (Sean Nuernberger kick); 9 plays, 70 yards, 3:00

Passing

- ARMY – Ahmad Bradshaw: 2/7, 19 yds
- OSU – J.T. Barrett: 25/33, 270 yds, 2 TD

Rushing

- ARMY – Darnell Woolfolk: 15 att, 74 yds, 1 TD
- OSU – J.K. Dobbins: 13 att, 172 yds, 2 TD

Receiving

- ARMY – Kell Walker: 1 rec, 10 yds
- OSU – K. J. Hill: 8 rec, 74 yds

=== At Tulane ===
Army Black Knights at Tulane Green Wave

Quarter	1	2	3	4	Total
Black Knights	0	10	0	7	17
Green Wave	7	7	0	7	21

at Yulman Stadium, New Orleans, Louisiana

- Date: September 23, 2017
- Game time: 11:00 a.m. CDT
- Game weather: Temperature: 88 F • Wind: ENE 8 mph • Weather: Mostly Sunny
- Game attendance: 16,643
- Referee: Anthony Calabrese
- TV announcers (CBSSN): Dave Ryan (Play-by-play), Corey Chavous (color) & Cassie McKinney (sideline)
- ESPN – Tulane defeats Army 21–17 /// Box Score, Army vs Tulane

Game information

First Quarter

- (14:49) TLN TD: Dontrell Hilliard 75-yard rush (Merek Glover kick); 1 play, 75 yards, 0:11

Second Quarter

- (13:39) ARMY FG: Blake Wilson 46-yard field goal; 13 plays, 69 yards, 7:39
- (04:33) ARMY TD: Ahmad Bradshaw 1-yard rush (Blake Wilson kick); 8 plays, 77 yards, 3:40
- (03:45) TLN TD: Sherman Badie 72-yard rush (Merek Glover kick); 2 plays, 76 yards, 0:41

Third Quarter

no scoring

Fourth Quarter

- (05:32) ARMY TD: Connor Slomka 5-yard rush (Blake Wilson kick); 15 plays, 71 yards, 8:07
- (00:23) TLN TD: Jonathan Banks 4-yard rush (Merek Glover kick); 19 plays, 75 yards, 5:09

Passing

- ARMY – Ahmad Bradshaw: 0/3, 0 yds, 1 INT
- TLN – Jonathan Banks: 10/22, 103 yds

Rushing

- ARMY – Andy Davidson: 26 att, 130 yds
- TLN – Dontrell Hilliard: 14 att, 134 yds, 1 TD

Receiving

- ARMY – No Receptions
- TLN – Terren Encalade: 4 rec, 38 yds

=== UTEP ===
UTEP Miners at Army Black Knights

Quarter	1	2	3	4	Total
Miners	7	7	0	7	21
Black Knights	0	14	14	7	35

at Michie Stadium, West Point, New York

- Date: September 30, 2017
- Game time: 3:30 p.m. EDT
- Game weather: Temperature: 57 F • Wind: N 11 mph • Weather: Mostly cloudy
- Game attendance: 31,133
- Referee: Jeff Flanagan
- TV announcers (CBSSN): Ben Holden (Play-by-play), Jay Feely (color) & John Schriffen (sideline)
- ESPN – Army can pass, too; Black Knights 35–21 over UTEP /// Box Score, UTEP vs Army

Game information

First Quarter

- (01:17) UTEP TD: Quardraiz Wadley 1-yard rush (Brady Viles kick); 15 plays, 81 yards, 8:23

Second Quarter

- (13:45) ARMY TD: Andy Davidson 32-yard rush (Blake Wilson kick); 5 plays, 75 yards, 2:32
- (02:47) ARMY TD: Calen Holt 19-yard rush (Blake Wilson kick); 12 plays, 93 yards, 7:30
- (00:35) UTEP TD: David Lucero 2-yard pass from Zack Greenlee (Brady Viles kick); 8 plays, 73 yards, 2:04

Third Quarter

- (12:31) ARMY TD: Connor Slomka 3-yard rush (Blake Wilson kick); 5 plays, 73 yards, 2:21
- (08:55) ARMY TD: Jordan Asberry 42-yard pass from Ahmad Bradshaw (Blake Wilson kick); 3 plays, 55 yards, 1:25

Fourth Quarter

- (13:48) ARMY TD: Connor Slomka 13-yard rush (Blake Wilson kick); 11 plays, 91 yards, 6:14
- (05:18) UTEP TD: Kahani Smith 52-yard interception return (Brady Viles kick)

Passing

- UTEP – Zack Greenlee: 7/13, 88 yds, 1 TD
- ARMY – Ahmad Bradshaw: 3/5, 80 yds, 1 TD

Rushing

- UTEP – Quardraiz Wadley: 28 att, 156 yds, 1 TD
- ARMY – Andy Davidson: 14 att, 100 yds, 1 TD

Receiving

- UTEP – Tyler Batson: 5 rec, 80 yds
- ARMY – Jordan Asberry: 1 rec, 42 yds, 1 TD

=== At Rice ===
Army Black Knights at Rice Owls

Quarter	1	2	3	4	Total
Black Knights	21	14	7	7	49
Owls	0	0	6	6	12

at Rice Stadium, Houston, Texas

- Date: October 7, 2017
- Game time: 5:30 p.m. CDT
- Game weather: Temperature: 89 F • Wind: N 8 mph • Weather: Clear
- Game attendance: 21,766
- Referee: Jonathan Noli
- TV announcers (beIN): Mike Gleason (Play-by-play), Donovan McNabb (color) & Michelle Gingras (sideline)
- ESPN – Army forces 6 Rice turnovers in 49–12 win /// Box Score, Army vs Rice

Game information

First Quarter

- (03:00) ARMY TD: Max Regan 48-yard interception return (Blake Wilson kick)
- (02:15) ARMY TD: Ahmad Bradshaw 3-yard rush (Blake Wilson kick); 2 plays, 9 yards, 0:38
- (01:53) ARMY TD: Kell Walker 23-yard rush (Blake Wilson kick); 1 play, 23 yards, 0:09

Second Quarter

- (14:56) ARMY TD: Kell Walker 8-yard rush (Blake Wilson kick); 3 plays, 67 yards, 1:03
- (07:02) ARMY TD: Kell Walker 47-yard rush (Blake Wilson kick); 7 plays, 79 yards, 3:58

Third Quarter

- (09:43) RICE TD: Emmanuel Esukpa 22-yard rush (Haden Tobola kick blocked); 7 plays, 49 yards, 3:06
- (04:18) ARMY TD: Ahmad Bradshaw 7-yard rush (Blake Wilson kick); 11 plays, 75 yards, 5:25

Fourth Quarter

- (10:36) ARMY TD: Luke Langdon 1-yard rush (Blake Wilson kick); 15 plays, 52 yards, 7:43
- (07:55) RICE TD: Aaron Cephus 58-yard pass from Jackson Tyner (Austin Trammell pass failed); 6 plays, 92 yards, 2:41

Passing

- ARMY – Kelvin Hopkins Jr.: 1/1, 9 yds
- RICE – Jackson Tyner: 7/16, 135 yds, 1 TD

Rushing

- ARMY – Kell Walker: 10 att, 127 yds, 3 TD
- RICE – Jordan Myers: 15 att, 76 yds

Receiving

- ARMY – Kjetil Cline: 1 rec, 9 yds
- RICE – Aaron Cephus: 3 rec, 87 yds, 1 TD

=== Eastern Michigan ===
Eastern Michigan Eagles at Army Black Knights

Quarter	1	2	3	4	Total
Eagles	7	7	0	13	27
Black Knights	7	7	7	7	28

at Michie Stadium, West Point, New York

- Date: October 14, 2017
- Game time: 12:00 p.m. EDT
- Game weather: Temperature: 70 F • Wind: NW 3 mph • Weather: Overcast
- Game attendance: 34,333
- Referee: David Epperley
- TV announcers (CBSSN): Ben Holden (Play-by-play), Jay Feely (color) & John Schriffen (sideline)
- ESPN – Army holds off Eastern Michigan 28–27 /// Box Score, Eastern Michigan vs Army

Game information

First Quarter

- (11:38) EMU TD: Sergio Bailey 15-yard pass from Brogan Roback (Paulie Fricano kick); 8 plays, 75 yards, 3:22
- (02:37) ARMY TD: Ahmad Bradshaw 9-yard rush (Blake Wilson kick); 14 plays, 93 yards, 8:49

Second Quarter

- (14:29) EMU TD: Antoine Porter 45-yard pass form Brogan Roback (Paulie Fricano kick); 7 plays, 92 yards, 2:57
- (08:17) ARMY TD: Kell Walker 17-yard rush (Blake Wilson kick); 11 plays, 75 yards, 6:12

Third Quarter

- (05:03) ARMY TD: Connor Slomka 2-yard rush (Blake Wilson kick); 7 plays, 94 yards, 3:51

Fourth Quarter

- (14:11) EMU TD: Matthew Sexton 8-yard pass from Brogan Roback (Paulie Fricano kick); 13 plays, 78 yards, 5:42
- (05:06) ARMY TD: Darnell Woolfolk 13-yard rush (Blake Wilson kick); 16 plays, 83 yards, 8:59
- (00:49) EMU TD: Sergio Bailey 8-yard pass from Brogan Roback (Ian Eriksen rush failed); 11 plays, 75 yards, 4:17

Passing

- EMU – Brogan Roback: 19/27, 229 yds, 4 TD, 1 INT
- ARMY – Ahmad Bradshaw: 0/3, 0 yds

Rushing

- EMU – Ian Eriksen: 20 att, 107 yds
- ARMY – Ahmad Bradshaw: 19 att, 171 yds, 1 TD

Receiving

- EMU – Sergio Bailey: 8 rec, 99 yds, 2 TD
- ARMY – No Receptions

=== Temple ===
Temple Owls at Army Black Knights

Quarter	1	2	3	4	OT	Total
Owls	0	14	0	14	0	28
Black Knights	7	7	0	14	3	31

at Michie Stadium, West Point, New York

- Date: October 21, 2017
- Game time: 12:00 p.m. EDT
- Game attendance: 34,876
- Referee: Stuart Mullins
- TV announcers (CBSSN): Ben Holden (Play-by-play), Jay Feely (color) & John Schriffen (sideline)
- ESPN – Army holds off Temple 31–28 in overtime /// Box Score, Temple vs Army

Game information

First Quarter

- (00:51) ARMY TD: Darnell Woolfolk 11-yard rush (Blake Wilson kick); 12 plays, 68 yards, 7:07

Second Quarter

- (12:30) ARMY TD: Darnell Woolfolk 4-yard rush (Blake Wilson kick); 2 plays, 28 yards, 0:48
- (10:05) TEMPLE TD: Isaiah Wright 50-yard rush (Aaron Boumerhi kick); 6 plays, 80 yards, 2:19
- (03:38) TEMPLE TD: Adonis Jennings 37-yard pass from Frank Nutile (Aaron Boumerhi kick); 6 plays, 83 yards, 2:50

Third Quarter

no scoring

Fourth Quarter

- (13:21) TEMPLE TD: Ryquell Armstead 43-yard rush (Aaron Boumerhi kick); 4 plays, 78 yards, 1:21
- (05:03) ARMY TD: Darnell Woolfolk 44-yard rush (Blake Wilson kick); 5 plays, 80 yards 2:31
- (01:38) TEMPLE TD: Ryquell Armstead 21-yard rush (Aaron Boumerhi kick); 8 plays, 58 yards, 3:16
- (00:01) ARMY TD: Jermaine Adams 16-yard pass from Kelvin Hopkins Jr. (Blake Wilson kick); 14 plays, 79 yards, 1:30

Overtime

- ARMY FG: Blake Wilson 29-yard field goal; 5 plays, 13 yards

Passing

- TEMPLE – Frank Nutile: 20/29, 290 yds, 1 TD
- ARMY – Ahmad Bradshaw: 3/5, 74 yds

Rushing

- TEMPLE – Ryquell Armstead: 18 att, 151 yds, 2 TD
- ARMY – Darnell Woolfolk: 18 att, 132 yds, 3 TD

Receiving

- TEMPLE – Isaiah Wright: 3 rec, 79 yds
- ARMY – Kell Walker: 3 rec, 59 yds

=== At Air Force ===
Army Black Knights at Air Force Falcons

Quarter	1	2	3	4	Total
Black Knights	7	7	0	7	21
Falcons	0	0	0	0	0

at Falcon Stadium, Colorado Springs, Colorado

- Date: November 4, 2017
- Game time: 1:30 p.m. MDT
- Game weather: Temperature: 61 F • Wind: WSW 28 mph • Weather: Sunny
- Game attendance: 41,875
- Referee: Jeff Heaser
- TV announcers (CBSSN): Ben Holden (Play-by-play), Jay Feely (color) & Lauren Gardner (sideline)
- ESPN – Army ends Air Force's 306-game scoring streak in 21–10 win /// Box Score, Army vs Air Force

Game information

First Quarter

- (12:21) ARMY TD: Ahmad Bradshaw 21-yard rush (Blake Wilson kick); 5 plays, 75 yards, 2:39

Second Quarter

- (06:18) ARMY TD: Kell Walker 27-yard rush (Blake Wilson kick); 9 plays, 78 yards, 5:17

Third Quarter

no scoring

Fourth Quarter

- (01:58) ARMY TD: Kell Walker 4-yard rush (Blake Wilson kick); 14 plays, 84 yards, 7:44

Passing

- ARMY – No Passes Attempted
- AF – Arion Worthman: 6/11, 95 yds

Rushing

- ARMY – Ahmad Bradshaw: 23 att, 265 yds, 1 TD
- AF – Timothy McVey: 10 att, 39 yds

Receiving

- ARMY – No Passes Attempted
- AF – Ronald Cleveland: 2 rec, 33 yds

=== Duke ===
Duke Blue Devils at Army Black Knights

Quarter	1	2	3	4	Total
Blue Devils	3	7	0	6	16
Black Knights	7	14	0	0	21

at Michie Stadium, West Point, New York

- Date: November 11, 2017
- Game time: 12:00 p.m. EST
- Game weather: Temperature: 34 F • Wind: N 10 mph • Weather: Clear, chilly
- Game attendance: 38,851
- Referee: Tra Blake
- TV announcers (CBSSN): Ben Holden (Play-by-play), Jay Feely (color) & Tina Cervasio (sideline)
- ESPN – Army holds off Duke 21–16, finishes unbeaten at home /// Box Score, Duke vs Army

Game information

First Quarter

- (08:35) DUKE FG: Austin Parker 22-yard field goal; 9 plays, 51 yards, 4:11
- (02:11) ARMY TD: Darnell Woolfolk 3-yard rush (Blake Wilson kick); 11 plays, 80 yards, 6:17

Second Quarter

- (14:40) ARMY TD: Jahvari Bourdeau 25-yard punt return (Blake Wilson kick)
- (08:20) ARMY TD: Ahmad Bradshaw 18-yard rush (Blake Wilson kick); 5 plays, 64 yards, 2:38
- (03:53) DUKE TD: Daniel Jones 4-yard rush (Austin Parker kick); 11 plays, 86 yards, 4:23

Third Quarter

no scoring

Fourth Quarter

- (14:56) DUKE TD: Brittain Brown 1-yard rush (Daniel Jones rush failed); 14 plays, 52 yards, 6:26

Passing

- DUKE – Daniel Jones: 19/29, 164 yds, 1 INT
- ARMY – Ahmad Bradshaw: 1/1, 42 yds

Rushing

- DUKE – Shaun Wilson: 7 att, 46 yds
- ARMY – Ahmad Bradshaw: 20 att, 96 yds, 1 TD

Receiving

- DUKE – T.J. Rahming: 3 rec, 40 yds
- ARMY – Kell Walker: 1 rec, 42 yds

=== At North Texas ===
Army Black Knights at North Texas Mean Green

Quarter	1	2	3	4	Total
Black Knights	7	13	8	21	49
Mean Green	14	14	7	17	52

at Apogee Stadium, Denton, Texas

- Date: November 18, 2017
- Game time: 5:30 p.m. CST
- Game weather: Temperature: 57 F • Wind: N 18 mph • Weather: Partly cloudy
- Game attendance: 26,392
- Referee: Rodney Burnette
- TV announcers (beIN): Mike Gleason (Play-by-play), Sean Salisbury (color) & Michelle Gingras (sideline)
- ESPN – Late FG lifts North Texas to wild 52–49 victory over Army /// Box Score, Army vs North Texas

Game information

First Quarter

- (10:55) NT TD: Jeffery Wilson 5-yard rush (Trevor Moore kick); 10 plays, 77 yards, 4:05
- (04:52) ARMY TD: Ahmad Bradshaw 1-yard rush (Blake Wilson kick); 11 plays, 70 yards, 6:03
- (03:31) NT TD: Turner Smiley 45-yard pass from Mason Fine (Trevor Moore kick); 3 plays, 76 yards, 1:21

Second Quarter

- (14:45) NT TD: Jeffery Wilson 7-yard rush (Trevor Moore kick); 2 plays, 7 yards, 0:08
- (08:58) ARMY TD: Ahmad Bradshaw 15-yard rush (Blake Wilson rush fumbled); 12 plays, 75 yards, 5:47
- (07:11) NT TD: Jalen Guyton 10-yard pass from Mason Fine (Trevor Moore kick); 5 plays, 32 yards, 1:47
- (04:33) ARMY TD: Darnell Woolfolk 7-yard rush (Blake Wilson kick); 6 plays, 75 yards, 2:38

Third Quarter

- (12:21) ARMY TD: Fred Cooper Jr. 17-yard rush (Ahmad Bradshaw rush for 2-pt conversion); 5 plays, 74 yards, 2:39
- (07:04) NT TD: Michael Lawrence 8-yard pass from Mason Fine (Trevor Moore kick); 11 plays, 88 yards, 5:17

Fourth Quarter

- (14:42) ARMY TD: Darnell Woolfolk 2-yard rush (Blake Wilson kick); 8 plays, 58 yards, 3:58
- (10:04) NT TD: Nic Smith 3-yard rush (Trevor Moore kick); 11 plays, 81 yards, 4:38
- (04:05) ARMY TD: Andy Davidson 4-yard rush (Blake Wilson kick); 11 plays, 75 yards, 5:59
- (03:13) NT TD: Turner Smiley 68-yard pass from Mason Fine (Trevor Moore kick); 3 plays, 71 yards, 0:52
- (01:23) ARMY TD: Andy Davidson 1-yard rush (Blake Wilson kick); 6 plays, 75 yards, 1:50
- (00:05) NT FG: Trevor Moore 39-yard field goal; 9 plays, 46 yards, 1:18

Passing

- ARMY – Ahmad Bradshaw: 1/3, 27 yds
- NT – Mason Fine: 24/36, 386 yds, 4 TD, 1 INT

Rushing

- ARMY – Ahmad Bradshaw: 27 att, 244 yds, 2 TD
- NT – Jeffery Wilson: 19 att, 72 yds, 2 TD

Receiving

- ARMY – John Trainor: 1 rec, 27 yds
- NT – Turner Smiley: 3 rec, 123 yds, 2 TD

=== Vs. Navy ===
Army Black Knights vs. Navy Midshipmen (118th Army-Navy Game)

Quarter	1	2	3	4	Total
Black Knights	7	0	0	7	14
Midshipmen	3	7	3	0	13

at Lincoln Financial Field, Philadelphia, Pennsylvania

- Date: December 9, 2017
- Game time: 3:00 p.m. EST
- Game weather: Temperature: 29 F • Wind: NE 6 mph • Weather: Snow
- Game attendance: 68,625
- Referee: Charles Lamertina
- TV announcers (CBS): Brad Nessler (Play-by-play), Gary Danielson (color) & Allie LaForce (sideline)
- ESPN – Field goal try wide on final play, Army holds off Navy 14–13 /// Box Score, Army vs Navy (118th Army-Navy Game)

Game information

First Quarter

- (08:06) ARMY TD: Darnell Woolfolk 3-yard rush (Blake Wilson kick); 11 plays, 68 yards, 6:54
- (00:55) NAVY FG: Bennett Moehring 28-yard field goal; 13 plays, 64 yards, 7:11

Second Quarter

- (11:28) NAVY TD: Malcolm Perry 68-yard rush (Bennett Moehring kick); 3 plays, 74 yards, 1:32

Third Quarter

- (09:16) NAVY FG: Bennett Moehring 24-yard field goal; 9 plays, 71 yards, 5:44

Fourth Quarter

- (05:10) ARMY TD: Ahmad Bradshaw 1-yard rush (Blake Wilson kick); 13 plays, 65 yards, 7:40

Passing

- ARMY – Ahmad Bradshaw: 1/1, 20 yds
- NAVY – Zach Abey: 1/1, 2 yds

Rushing

- ARMY – Ahmad Bradshaw: 21 att, 94 yds, 1 TD
- NAVY – Malcolm Perry: 30 att, 250 yds, 1 TD

Receiving

- ARMY – Calen Holt: 1 rec, 20 yds
- NAVY – Malcolm Perry: 1 rec, 2 yds

=== Vs. San Diego State – Armed Forces Bowl ===
San Diego State Aztecs vs. Army Black Knights (2017 Lockheed Martin Armed Forces Bowl)

Quarter	1	2	3	4	Total
Aztecs	7	14	7	7	35
Black Knights	7	14	0	21	42

at Amon G. Carter Stadium, Fort Worth, Texas

- Date: December 23, 2017
- Game time: 2:30 p.m. CST
- Game weather: Temperature: 48 F • Wind: NNW 2 mph • Weather: Sunny
- Game attendance: 35,986
- Referee: Ron Snodgrass
- TV announcers (ESPN): Adam Amin (Play-by-play), Mack Brown (color) & Paul Carcaterra (sideline)
- ESPN – Penny's record-tying day can't top 10-win Army /// Box Score, San Diego State vs Army (2017 Lockheed Martin Armed Forces Bowl)

Game information

First Quarter

- (13:36) SDSU TD: Rashaad Penny 81-yard rush (John Baron kick); 3 plays, 73 yards, 1:24
- (02:13) ARMY TD: Ahmad Bradshaw 19-yard rush (Blake Wilson kick); 8 plays, 70 yards, 4:09

Second Quarter

- (14:52) SDSU TD: Rashaad Penny 32-yard rush (John Baron kick); 5 plays, 70 yards, 2:13
- (07:50) ARMY TD: Darnell Woolfolk 7-yard rush (Blake Wilson kick); 12 plays, 74 yards, 6:58
- (00:18) ARMY TD: Andy Davidson 4-yard rush (Blake Wilson kick); 13 plays, 53 yards, 5:55
- (00:05) SDSU TD: Juwan Washington 78-yard kickoff return (John Baron kick)

Third Quarter

- (01:49) SDSU TD: Rashaad Penny 49-yard rush (John Baron kick); 4 plays, 72 yards, 1:52

Fourth Quarter

- (09:25) ARMY TD: Ahmad Bradshaw 27-yard rush (Blake Wilson kick); 10 plays, 79 yards, 4:47
- (05:47) SDSU TD: Rashaad Penny 4-yard rush (John Baron kick); 7 plays, 44 yards, 3:31
- (00:18) ARMY TD: Darnell Woolfolk 1-yard rush (Kell Walker rush for 2-pt conversion); 15 plays, 72 yards, 5:24
- (00:00) ARMY TD: Elijah Riley 29-yard fumble recovery

Passing

- SDSU – Christian Chapman: 6/10, 25 yds, 1 INT
- ARMY – Ahmad Bradshaw: 1/3, 6 yds

Rushing

- SDSU – Rashaad Penny: 14 att, 221 yds, 4 TD
- ARMY – Ahmad Bradshaw: 32 att, 180 yds, 2 TD

Receiving

- SDSU – Fred Trevillion: 3 rec, 34 yds
- ARMY – Cam Harrison: 1 rec, 6 yds
