= 2017 San Diego State Aztecs football team =

American college football season

2017 San Diego State Aztecs football

Armed Forces Bowl, L 35–42 vs. Army
- Conference: Mountain West Conference
- West Division
- Record: 10–3 (6–2 MW)
- Head coach: Rocky Long (7th season)
- Offensive coordinator: Jeff Horton (3rd season)
- Offensive scheme: Pro-style
- Defensive coordinator: Danny Gonzales (1st season)
- Base defense: 3–3–5
- Home stadium: SDCCU Stadium

2017 Mountain West Conference football standings
| | Conf. | | | Overall |
| Team | W | | L | W | | L |
|---|---|---|---|---|---|---|
Mountain Division
| No. 22 Boise State xy$ | 7 | – | 1 | 11 | – | 3 |
| Colorado State | 5 | – | 3 | 7 | – | 6 |
| Wyoming | 5 | – | 3 | 8 | – | 5 |
| Utah State | 4 | – | 4 | 6 | – | 7 |
| Air Force | 4 | – | 4 | 5 | – | 7 |
| New Mexico | 1 | – | 7 | 3 | – | 9 |
West Division
| Fresno State xy | 7 | – | 1 | 10 | – | 4 |
| San Diego State | 6 | – | 2 | 10 | – | 3 |
| UNLV | 4 | – | 4 | 5 | – | 7 |
| Nevada | 3 | – | 5 | 3 | – | 9 |
| Hawaii | 1 | – | 7 | 3 | – | 9 |
| San Jose State | 1 | – | 7 | 2 | – | 11 |
Championship: Boise State 17, Fresno State 14
$ – Conference champion; x – Division champion/co-champions; y – Championship game participant; Rankings from AP Poll

The 2017 San Diego State Aztecs football team represented San Diego State University in the 2017 NCAA Division I FBS football season. The Aztecs were led by seventh-year head coach Rocky Long and played their home games at SDCCU Stadium. San Diego State competed a member of the Mountain West Conference in the West Division. They finished the season 10–3, 6–2 in Mountain West play to finish in second place in the West Division. They were invited to the Armed Forces Bowl where they lost to Army.

== Personnel ==
=== Position key ===
| Back | B | Center | C | Cornerback | CB | Defensive back | DB |
| Defensive end | DE | Defensive lineman | DL | Defensive tackle | DT | End | E |
| Fullback | FB | Guard | G | Halfback | HB | Kicker | K |
| Kickoff returner | KR | Offensive tackle | OT | Offensive lineman | OL | Linebacker | LB |
| Long snapper | LS | Punter | P | Punt returner | PR | Quarterback | QB |
| Running back | RB | Safety | S | Tight end | TE | Wide receiver | WR |

=== Recruiting class ===
The Aztecs signed a total of 23 recruits.

College recruiting information (2017)
| Name | Hometown | School | Height | Weight | Commit date |
|---|---|---|---|---|---|
| Andrew Aleki; LB | Honolulu, Hawaii | Kamehameha HS | 6 ft 2 in (1.88 m) | 219 lb (99 kg) | Jan 24, 2017 |
| Andrew Aleki; LB | Recruit ratings: Scout: Rivals: 247Sports: | | | | |
| Ladji Bagayoko; OL | Saint-Laurent, Quebec, Canada | Bishop Alemany HS | 6 ft 6 in (1.98 m) | 310 lb (140 kg) | Dec 11, 2016 |
| Ladji Bagayoko; OL | Recruit ratings: Scout: Rivals: 247Sports: ESPN: | | | | |
| Chance Bell; RB | Burbank, California | John Burroughs HS | 5 ft 9 in (1.75 m) | 185 lb (84 kg) | Jul 25, 2016 |
| Chance Bell; RB | Recruit ratings: Scout: Rivals: 247Sports: ESPN: | | | | |
| Desmond Bessent; OL | Tampa, Florida | Sickles HS | 6 ft 7 in (2.01 m) | 293 lb (133 kg) | Feb 1, 2017 |
| Desmond Bessent; OL | Recruit ratings: Scout: Rivals: 247Sports: | | | | |
| Mark Brown; DL | Fort Worth, Texas | Arlington Heights HS | 6 ft 4 in (1.93 m) | 220 lb (100 kg) | Jun 21, 2016 |
| Mark Brown; DL | Recruit ratings: Scout: Rivals: 247Sports: ESPN: | | | | |
| Shane Coleman; TE | Las Flores, California | Tesoro HS | 6 ft 6 in (1.98 m) | 198 lb (90 kg) | Oct 18, 2016 |
| Shane Coleman; TE | Recruit ratings: Scout: Rivals: 247Sports: | | | | |
| Ethan Dedeaux; WR | Las Vegas, Nevada | Liberty HS | 5 ft 9 in (1.75 m) | 170 lb (77 kg) | Jun 26, 2016 |
| Ethan Dedeaux; WR | Recruit ratings: Scout: Rivals: 247Sports: ESPN: | | | | |
| Dominic Gudino; OL | Chula Vista, California | Olympian HS | 6 ft 2 in (1.88 m) | 300 lb (140 kg) | Oct 23, 2016 |
| Dominic Gudino; OL | Recruit ratings: Scout: Rivals: 247Sports: ESPN: | | | | |
| Darren Hall; DB | Pasadena, California | Rancho Cucamonga HS | 5 ft 11 in (1.80 m) | 161 lb (73 kg) | Dec 24, 2016 |
| Darren Hall; DB | Recruit ratings: Scout: Rivals: 247Sports: ESPN: | | | | |
| Shane Irwin; DL | Palos Verdes Estates, California | Palos Verdes HS | 6 ft 4 in (1.93 m) | 229 lb (104 kg) | Dec 7, 2016 |
| Shane Irwin; DL | Recruit ratings: Scout: Rivals: 247Sports: ESPN: | | | | |
| Delon Jemmott; OL | Toronto, Ontario, Canada | Carnegie Schools Riverside HS | 6 ft 6 in (1.98 m) | 265 lb (120 kg) | Jan 25, 2017 |
| Delon Jemmott; OL | Recruit ratings: Scout: Rivals: 247Sports: | | | | |
| Seyddrick Lakalaka; LB | Honolulu, Hawaii | Punahou HS | 6 ft 1 in (1.85 m) | 220 lb (100 kg) | Oct 20, 2016 |
| Seyddrick Lakalaka; LB | Recruit ratings: Scout: Rivals: 247Sports: | | | | |
| Anthony Luke; DL | Roseville, California | American River CC | 6 ft 4 in (1.93 m) | 250 lb (110 kg) | Dec 22, 2016 |
| Anthony Luke; DL | Recruit ratings: Scout: Rivals: 247Sports: | | | | |
| Chris Martinez; OL | Turlock, California | Pitman HS | 6 ft 4 in (1.93 m) | 272 lb (123 kg) | Feb 1, 2017 |
| Chris Martinez; OL | Recruit ratings: Scout: Rivals: 247Sports: | | | | |
| Caden McDonald; LB | Haslet, Texas | Northwest HS | 6 ft 2 in (1.88 m) | 210 lb (95 kg) | Jun 23, 2016 |
| Caden McDonald; LB | Recruit ratings: Scout: Rivals: 247Sports: ESPN: | | | | |
| Connor Mitchell; DL | Wauconda, Illinois | Wauconda HS | 6 ft 3 in (1.91 m) | 250 lb (110 kg) | Oct 23, 2016 |
| Connor Mitchell; DL | Recruit ratings: Scout: Rivals: 247Sports: | | | | |
| Isaiah Richardson; WR | Palmdale, California | Chaminade HS | 6 ft 0 in (1.83 m) | 180 lb (82 kg) | Sep 22, 2016 |
| Isaiah Richardson; WR | Recruit ratings: Scout: Rivals: 247Sports: ESPN: | | | | |
| Kyre Richardson; WR | Tulsa, Oklahoma | Tulsa Union HS | 6 ft 3 in (1.91 m) | 172 lb (78 kg) | Jan 29, 2017 |
| Kyre Richardson; WR | Recruit ratings: Scout: Rivals: 247Sports: | | | | |
| Cam Roane; QB | Colleyville, Texas | Heritage HS | 6 ft 2 in (1.88 m) | 189 lb (86 kg) | May 31, 2016 |
| Cam Roane; QB | Recruit ratings: Scout: Rivals: 247Sports: ESPN: | | | | |
| Mark Salazar; QB | San Diego | Rancho Bernardo HS | 6 ft 2 in (1.88 m) | 177 lb (80 kg) | Jun 22, 2016 |
| Mark Salazar; QB | Recruit ratings: Scout: Rivals: 247Sports: | | | | |
| Tariq Thompson; DB | San Diego | St. Augustine HS | 5 ft 11 in (1.80 m) | 190 lb (86 kg) | Feb 1, 2017 |
| Tariq Thompson; DB | Recruit ratings: Scout: Rivals: 247Sports: ESPN: | | | | |
| Tayari Venable; DB | Moreno Valley, California | Rancho Cucamonga HS | 6 ft 0 in (1.83 m) | 162 lb (73 kg) | Jan 22, 2017 |
| Tayari Venable; DB | Recruit ratings: Scout: Rivals: 247Sports: ESPN: | | | | |
| Kaegun Williams; RB | Cedar Hill, Texas | Cedar Hill HS | 5 ft 9 in (1.75 m) | 188 lb (85 kg) | Feb 1, 2017 |
| Kaegun Williams; RB | Recruit ratings: Scout: Rivals: 247Sports: ESPN: | | | | |
Overall recruit ranking:
Note: In many cases, Scout, Rivals, 247Sports, On3, and ESPN may conflict in their listings of height and weight.; In these cases, the average was taken. ESPN grades are on a 100-point scale.; Sources: "2017 Team Ranking". Rivals.com.

== Schedule ==
| Date | Time | Opponent | Rank | Site | TV | Result | Attendance |
|---|---|---|---|---|---|---|---|
| September 2 | 5:30 p.m. | UC Davis* | | Qualcomm Stadium; Qualcomm Stadium | Stadium | W 38–17 | 46,132 |
| September 9 | 8:00 p.m. | at Arizona State* | | Sun Devil Stadium; Tempe, AZ | P12N | W 30–20 | 54,336 |
| September 16 | 7:30 p.m. | No. 19 Stanford* | | Qualcomm Stadium; San Diego, CA | CBSSN | W 20–17 | 43,040 |
| September 23 | 4:00 p.m. | at Air Force | No. 22 | Falcon Stadium; Colorado Spinrgs, CO | CBSSN | W 28–24 | 27,575 |
| September 30 | 7:30 p.m. | Northern Illinois* | No. 19 | SDCCU Stadium; San Diego, CA | CBSSN | W 34–28 | 35,717 |
| October 7 | 7:45 p.m. | at UNLV | No. 19 | Sam Boyd Stadium; Whitney, NV | ESPN2 | W 41–10 | 19,770 |
| October 14 | 7:30 p.m. | Boise State | No. 19 | SDCCU Stadium; San Diego, CA | CBSSN | L 14–31 | 49,053 |
| October 21 | 7:30 p.m. | Fresno State^{†} | | SDCCU Stadium; San Diego, CA (rivalry) | CBSSN | L 3–27 | 43,243 |
| October 28 | 8:15 p.m. | at Hawaii | | Aloha Stadium; Halawa, HI | ESPN2 | W 28–7 | 23,018 |
| November 4 | 7:30 p.m. | at San Jose State | | CEFCU Stadium; San Jose, CA | ESPNU | W 52–7 | 17,629 |
| November 18 | 7:30 p.m. | Nevada | | SDCCU Stadium; San Diego, CA | CBSSN | W 42–23 | 29,265 |
| November 24 | 12:30 p.m. | New Mexico | | SDCCU Stadium; San Diego, CA | CBSSN | W 35–10 | 28,978 |
| December 23 | 12:30 p.m. | vs. Army* | | Amon G. Carter Stadium; Fort Worth, TX \ (Armed Forces Bowl) | ESPN | L 35–42 | 35,986 |
*Non-conference game; ^{†}Homecoming; Rankings from AP Poll released prior to the game; All times are in Pacific time

== Rankings ==
Ranking movements Legend: ██ Increase in ranking ██ Decrease in ranking — = Not ranked RV = Received votes
| | Week | | | | | | | | | | | | | | | |
| Poll | Pre | 1 | 2 | 3 | 4 | 5 | 6 | 7 | 8 | 9 | 10 | 11 | 12 | 13 | 14 | Final |
|---|---|---|---|---|---|---|---|---|---|---|---|---|---|---|---|---|
| AP | RV | RV | RV | 22 | 19 | 19 | 19 | RV | RV | RV | RV | — | RV | RV | RV | RV |
| Coaches | RV | RV | RV | 25 | 21 | 21 | 18 | RV | — | RV | RV | RV | RV | 25 | RV | RV |
| CFP | Not released | | | | | | | | | — | — | — | — | — | — | Not released |

== Game summaries ==
=== UC Davis ===
| | 1 | 2 | 3 | 4 | Total |
|---|---|---|---|---|---|
| Aggies | 3 | 0 | 0 | 14 | 17 |
| Aztecs | 10 | 14 | 14 | 0 | 38 |

=== at Arizona State ===
| | 1 | 2 | 3 | 4 | Total |
|---|---|---|---|---|---|
| Aztecs | 7 | 13 | 7 | 3 | 30 |
| Sun Devils | 7 | 7 | 0 | 6 | 20 |

=== Stanford ===
| | 1 | 2 | 3 | 4 | Total |
|---|---|---|---|---|---|
| No. 19 Cardinal | 0 | 7 | 3 | 7 | 17 |
| Aztecs | 0 | 10 | 3 | 7 | 20 |

=== at Air Force ===
| | 1 | 2 | 3 | 4 | Total |
|---|---|---|---|---|---|
| No. 22 Aztecs | 0 | 7 | 7 | 14 | 28 |
| Falcons | 6 | 3 | 0 | 15 | 24 |

=== Northern Illinois ===
| | 1 | 2 | 3 | 4 | Total |
|---|---|---|---|---|---|
| Huskies | 14 | 0 | 14 | 0 | 28 |
| No. 19 Aztecs | 14 | 17 | 0 | 3 | 34 |

=== at UNLV ===
| | 1 | 2 | 3 | 4 | Total |
|---|---|---|---|---|---|
| No. 19 Aztecs | 3 | 17 | 7 | 14 | 41 |
| Rebels | 3 | 7 | 0 | 0 | 10 |

=== Boise State ===
| | 1 | 2 | 3 | 4 | Total |
|---|---|---|---|---|---|
| Broncos | 14 | 7 | 0 | 10 | 31 |
| No. 19 Aztecs | 0 | 0 | 7 | 7 | 14 |

=== Fresno State ===
| | 1 | 2 | 3 | 4 | Total |
|---|---|---|---|---|---|
| Bulldogs | 7 | 10 | 10 | 0 | 27 |
| Aztecs | 0 | 3 | 0 | 0 | 3 |

=== at Hawaii ===
| | 1 | 2 | 3 | 4 | Total |
|---|---|---|---|---|---|
| Aztecs | 7 | 7 | 7 | 7 | 28 |
| Rainbow Warriors | 0 | 7 | 0 | 0 | 7 |

=== at San Jose State ===
| | 1 | 2 | 3 | 4 | Total |
|---|---|---|---|---|---|
| Aztecs | 21 | 14 | 14 | 3 | 52 |
| Spartans | 0 | 0 | 7 | 0 | 7 |

=== Nevada ===
| | 1 | 2 | 3 | 4 | Total |
|---|---|---|---|---|---|
| Wolf Pack | 10 | 7 | 0 | 6 | 23 |
| Aztecs | 14 | 7 | 7 | 14 | 42 |

=== New Mexico ===
| | 1 | 2 | 3 | 4 | Total |
|---|---|---|---|---|---|
| Lobos | 0 | 0 | 10 | 0 | 10 |
| Aztecs | 7 | 7 | 7 | 14 | 35 |

=== vs Army–Armed Forces Bowl ===
| | 1 | 2 | 3 | 4 | Total |
|---|---|---|---|---|---|
| Black Knights | 7 | 14 | 0 | 21 | 42 |
| Aztecs | 7 | 14 | 7 | 7 | 35 |

== Players in the 2018 NFL draft ==
| Player | Position | Round | Pick | NFL club |
| Rashaad Penny | RB | 1 | 27 | Seattle Seahawks |
| Nick Bawden | FB | 7 | 237 | Detroit Lions |
