= 2017 NCAA Division I FBS football season =

American college football season

2017 NCAA Division I FBS season
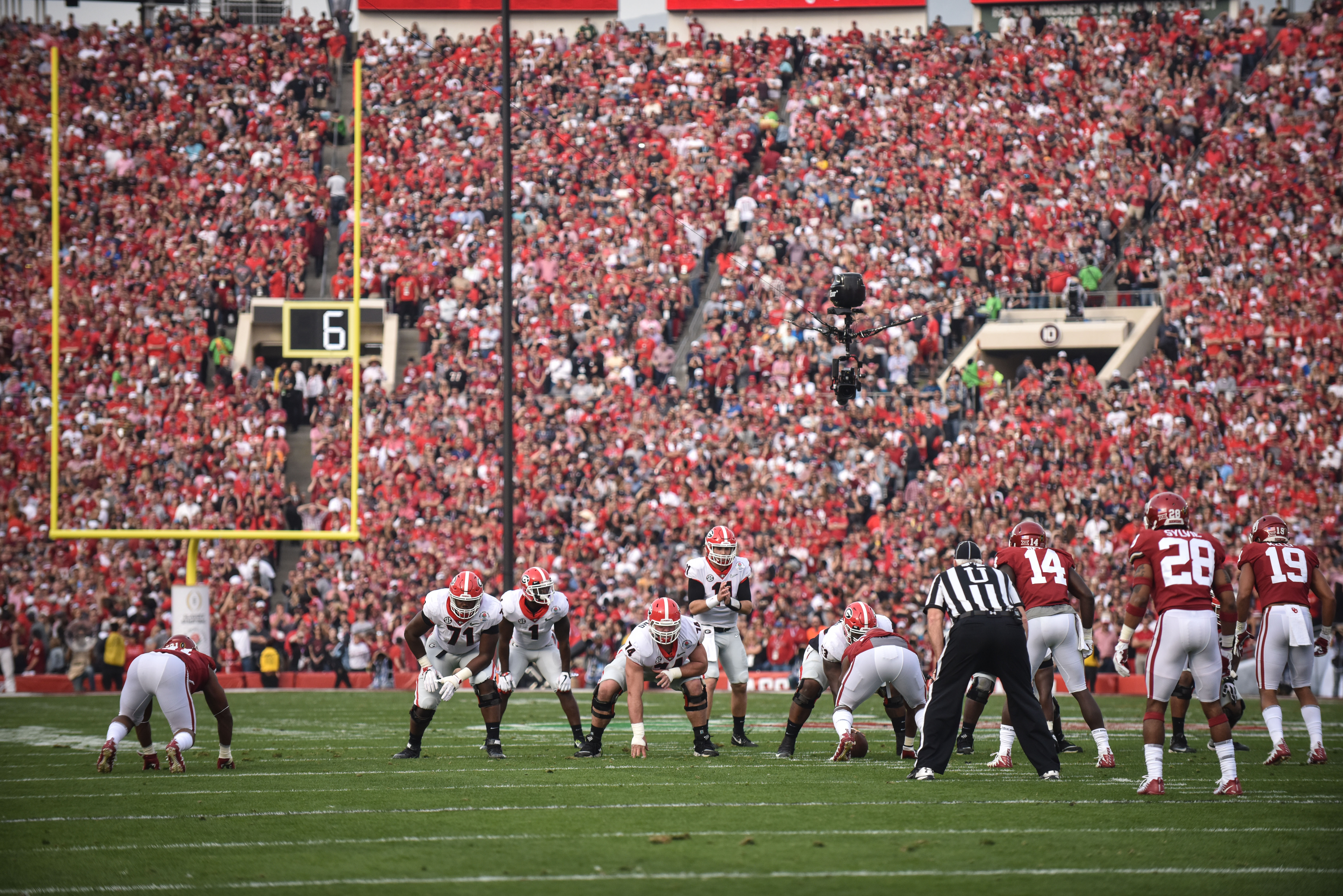
- The Rose Bowl featuring Georgia and Oklahoma
- Number of teams: 129 + 1 transitional
- Duration: August 26, 2017 – December 9, 2017
- Preseason AP No. 1: Alabama

Postseason
- Duration: December 16, 2017 – January 8, 2018
- Bowl games: 40
- AP Poll No. 1: Alabama
- Coaches Poll No. 1: Alabama
- Heisman Trophy: Baker Mayfield (quarterback, Oklahoma)

College Football Playoff
- 2018 College Football Playoff National Championship
- Site: Mercedes-Benz Stadium; Atlanta, Georgia
- Champion(s): Alabama

NCAA Division I FBS football seasons
- ← 2016 2018 →

The 2017 NCAA Division I FBS football season was the highest level of college football competition in the United States organized by the National Collegiate Athletic Association (NCAA) in 2017. The regular season began on August 26, 2017, and ended on December 9, 2017.

The postseason concluded on January 8, 2018 with the 2018 College Football Playoff National Championship in Atlanta, the fourth iteration of the College Football Playoff championship system. In the national championship game, Alabama defeated Georgia in overtime, 26–23.

The UCF Knights also claim a national championship for this season after finishing first in the Colley Matrix poll, and are listed as "Final National Poll Leaders" in the NCAA's official record book. UCF finished the season as the only undefeated team in NCAA Division I FBS and defeated the Auburn Tigers in the Peach Bowl. Auburn had defeated College Football Playoff national champion Alabama and runner-up Georgia during the season.

== Rule changes ==
=== Game rules ===
The following rule changes were recommended by the NCAA Football Rules Committee for the 2017 season:

- Prohibiting defensive players running toward the line of scrimmage from leaping or hurdling any offensive lineman on field goal or PAT attempts (15 yards). Previously defensive players were allowed to leap or hurdle offensive linemen as long as they do not land on another player. The NFL also adopted this rule for the 2017 season.
- Requiring players to wear knee pads and pants that cover the knees. Previously this was only a recommendation.
- Include the nameplate on the back of the jersey in the definition of a "horse-collar tackle".

The committee left the current targeting rules unchanged for the 2017 season, despite discussions to modify the rule to eject a player for targeting only if the call is confirmed, not if the call stands due to lack of "indisputable video evidence" to overturn the ruling on the field.

Points of emphasis this season include speeding up games by:

- Promptly starting the second half when the halftime clock reaches 0:00.
- Penalizing coaches for coming on the field to argue a call (15 yards, unsportsmanlike conduct).
- Starting the game clock immediately upon spotting the ball after a ball carrier goes out of bounds (outside of the last 2:00 of each half).

=== Recruiting rules ===
- The NCAA Division I Council approved a suite of rule changes affecting the recruiting process. The most significant of these are:
  - Effective with the 2017–18 school year, a national early signing period for high school players will be introduced, at a time in December to be announced later.
  - The current limit of 25 new scholarships (or financial aid agreements) per academic year will become an absolute limit (with only narrowly defined exceptions). This has been seen by media as ending the phenomenon of oversigning.
  - FBS programs may no longer conduct so-called "satellite camps"—i.e., camps or clinics that feature active FBS coaches or football staff members held at locations distant from the school's campus. Effective immediately, FBS coaches may only work at camps for a total of 10 days in June and July, and can only attend camps if they are located on their school's campus, or at an off-campus facility where their program regularly practices or plays home games. Schools are allowed to honor contracts for satellite camps that were signed before January 18, 2017.
- The Collegiate Commissioners Association, which controls the letter of intent program, approved the recruiting changes approved last month by the Division I Council. The early signing period for high schoolers is fixed as the first three days of the midyear signing period for junior college players; in 2017, this window will fall on December 20–22.

== Conference realignment ==
=== Membership changes ===
School	Former conference	New conference
Coastal Carolina Chanticleers	FCS independent	Sun Belt
UAB Blazers	Team reestablished	C-USA

Coastal Carolina is in the second year of its FBS transition. It is counted as an FBS opponent for scheduling purposes but will not become a full bowl-eligible member until the 2018 season.

The UAB football team returned after a two-year absence. The program was shut down by school administrators following the 2014 season but was reinstated less than a year later. UAB resumed its place as a full, football-sponsoring member of Conference USA.

=== Upcoming changes ===
Idaho and New Mexico State are playing their final seasons as football members of the Sun Belt Conference. Idaho is also playing its last season at the FBS level; following the decision of the Sun Belt to not extend its football membership agreements with the two schools after their expirations in 2017, Idaho announced that it would downgrade to FCS and add football to its standing membership in the Big Sky Conference. New Mexico State will tentatively revert to FBS Independent status for 2018 and beyond.

== Updated stadiums ==
Two schools opened new stadiums for the 2017 season:

- Colorado State opened Sonny Lubick Field at Colorado State Stadium. The on-campus facility, with a capacity of 41,201, replaces the off-campus Hughes Stadium, which had been home to the Rams since 1968.
- Georgia State moved from the Georgia Dome, set to be demolished during the 2017 season, to Georgia State Stadium. This is the third incarnation of a stadium that opened in 1996 as the Centennial Olympic Stadium, built for the 1996 Summer Olympics. The stadium was planned from the beginning to be retrofitted into a baseball park for the Atlanta Braves, and opened in that form as Turner Field in 1997. After the Braves vacated Turner Field following their 2016 season to move into SunTrust Park, Georgia State bought Turner Field and adjacent property for a major campus expansion project. In its football form, the stadium initially seats 23,000 with possible future expansion to 33,000.

Several other schools plan to debut major improvements to their existing venues for 2017:

- Arizona State is continuing a four-phase renovation of Sun Devil Stadium. The third phase, slated for completion in time for the 2017 season, includes the addition of a new video board above the north end zone.
- Coastal Carolina will make its FBS debut in an expanded Brooks Stadium. The expansion project began immediately after the 2015 season, a few months after Coastal announced it would join the Sun Belt Conference in 2016 for non-football sports and 2017 for football. The venue, which previously held 9,200 people, will now have a capacity of 15,000 for the 2017 season, and will be further expanded to 20,000 in 2018.
- West Virginia is nearing completion of approximately $50 million in renovations to Milan Puskar Stadium. Work on the west and south side gates and concourses, including renovations to concessions, restrooms, and additional space for EMS and police operations, is expected to be complete for 2017, mirroring similar work on the north and east sides completed for 2016.
- Louisiana Tech will open a new pressbox and suite complex on the west side of Joe Aillet Stadium which includes new ticketing facilities and restrooms. Also included in the renovations are, new LED stadium lighting fixtures.
- Notre Dame will debut the Campus Crossroads project, which will add three new 8-story structures on the South, West and East sides of Notre Dame Stadium. The expansion will add new premium stadium seats on the East and West sides of the stadium and feature more than 750,000 square feet of teaching, research, and performance space.

Two schools announced naming rights deals for their stadiums:

- Kentucky renamed its stadium from Commonwealth Stadium to Kroger Field per a 12-year naming rights deal with the Cincinnati-based supermarket company. This makes UK the first Southeastern Conference school to enter into such a deal for its football stadium.
- New Mexico renames its stadium from University Stadium to Dreamstyle Stadium per a 10-year naming rights deal with Albuquerque-based construction firm Dreamstyle Remodeling.

== Kickoff games ==
=== "Week Zero" ===
- A recent rule change allows Hawai'i, and teams that have a scheduled game at Hawai'i, to play during the "Week Zero" kickoff weekend in late August. This change better accommodates the long-standing "Hawai'i rule" that allows schools which travel between Hawai'i and the mainland (including schools based in Hawai'i) to schedule an extra game each season. Four schools have taken advantage of the extra week:
  - Hawai'i played at UMass on August 26, with the visitors winning 38–35. UMass ended their 2016 season with a loss at Hawai'i, and thus opened their 2017 season against the same opponent.
  - BYU hosted FCS opponent Portland State on August 26, winning 20–6.
  - San Jose State hosted USF on August 26, with the visitors winning 42–22.
  - Colorado State hosted Oregon State on August 26 in the first game at the Rams' new stadium (see above), and won 58–27.
- Stanford and Rice played in Sydney on August 26 (August 27 local time) for the second Sydney Cup, won by Stanford in a 62–7 blowout. This was the second straight year a Pac-12 team went to Australia, as California defeated Hawai'i in the first Sydney Cup to open the 2016 season.

=== Week 1 ===
During the official Week 1 (as usual, held the weekend before Labor Day), several neutral-site "kickoff weekend" games were held, in addition to a full slate of games held at home stadiums around the U.S.:

- Advocare Classic
  - #17 Florida played against #11 Michigan at AT&T Stadium (Arlington, Texas) on September 2, with Michigan winning 33–17.
- Belk Kickoff Game
  - North Carolina State played against South Carolina at Bank of America Stadium (Charlotte, North Carolina) on September 2, with the Gamecocks winning 35–28.
- Chick-fil-A Kickoff Games
  - #1 Alabama defeated #3 Florida State Alabama rolled past FSU 24–7 at the new Mercedes-Benz Stadium (Atlanta, Georgia) on September 2.
  - #25 Tennessee defeated Georgia Tech Tennessee came back and won in a classic 42–41 in double overtime at Mercedes-Benz Stadium on September 4.
- Advocare Texas Kickoff
  - #13 LSU defeated BYU LSU stumped BYU 27–0 at the Mercedes-Benz Superdome (Note: This game was originally scheduled to be played at NRG Stadium in Houston, Texas: however ongoing flooding resulting from Hurricane Harvey forced its relocation.) (New Orleans, Louisiana) on September 2.

== Regular season top 10 matchups ==
Rankings reflect the AP Poll. Rankings for Week 10 and beyond will list College Football Playoff Rankings first and AP Poll second. Teams that fail to be a top 10 team for one poll or the other will be noted.

- Week 1
  - No. 1 Alabama defeated No. 3 Florida State, 24–7 (Mercedes-Benz Stadium, Atlanta, GA)
- Week 2
  - No. 5 Oklahoma defeated No. 2 Ohio State, 30–16 (Ohio Stadium, Columbus, OH)
- Week 9
  - No. 6 Ohio State defeated No. 2 Penn State, 39–38 (Ohio Stadium, Columbus, OH)
- Week 11
  - No. 10/10 Auburn defeated No. 1/2 Georgia, 40–17 (Jordan–Hare Stadium, Auburn, AL)
  - No. 7/7 Miami defeated No. 3/3 Notre Dame, 41–8 (Hard Rock Stadium, Miami Gardens, FL)
  - No. 5/5 Oklahoma defeated No. 6/8 TCU, 38–20 (Gaylord Family Oklahoma Memorial Stadium, Norman, OK)
- Week 13
  - No. 6/6 Auburn defeated No. 1/1 Alabama, 26–14 (Jordan–Hare Stadium, Auburn, AL)
- Week 14
  - No. 1/1 Clemson defeated No. 7/7 Miami, 38–3 (2017 ACC Championship Game), Bank of America Stadium, Charlotte, NC
  - No. 6/6 Georgia defeated No. 2/4 Auburn, 28–7 (2017 SEC Championship Game, Mercedes-Benz Stadium, Atlanta, GA)
  - No. 3/2 Oklahoma defeated No. 11/10 TCU, 41–17 (2017 Big 12 Championship Game, AT&T Stadium, Arlington, TX)
  - No. 8/8 Ohio State defeated No. 4/3 Wisconsin, 27–21 (2017 Big Ten Championship Game, Lucas Oil Stadium, Indianapolis, IN)

== Upsets ==
For purposes of this table, an "upset" involves an unranked team defeating a ranked team.

FBS rankings prior to November 1 are from the AP Poll, and from the College Football Playoff rankings after that date.

Winner	Score	Loser	Date
Maryland	51–41	#23 Texas	September 2
Memphis	48–45	#25 UCLA	September 16
Mississippi State	37–7	#12 LSU	September 16
Vanderbilt	14–7	#18 Kansas State	September 16
San Diego State	20–17	#19 Stanford	September 16
NC State	27–21	#12 Florida State	September 23
Arizona State	37–35	#24 Oregon	September 23
Troy	24–21	#25 LSU	September 30
Iowa State	38–31	#3 Oklahoma	October 7
LSU	17–16	#21 Florida	October 7
Michigan State	14–10	#7 Michigan	October 7
Stanford	23–20	#20 Utah	October 7
Syracuse	27–24	#2 Clemson	October 13
California	37–3	#8 Washington State	October 13
West Virginia	46–35	#24 Texas Tech	October 14
LSU	27–23	#10 Auburn	October 14
Memphis	30–27	#25 Navy	October 14
Boise State	31–14	#19 San Diego State	October 14
Arizona State	13–7	#5 Washington	October 14
Northwestern	39–31 ^{3OT}	#16 Michigan State	October 28
Houston	28–24	#17 South Florida	October 28
Arizona	58–37	#15 Washington State	October 28
Iowa	55–24	#6 Ohio State	November 4
West Virginia	20–16	#15 Iowa State	November 4
Stanford	30–22	#9 Washington	November 10
Georgia Tech	28–22	#17 Virginia Tech	November 11
Kansas State	45–40	#13 Oklahoma State	November 18
Wake Forest	30–24	#19 NC State	November 18
Ole Miss	31–28	#16 Mississippi State	November 23
Pittsburgh	24–14	#2 Miami (FL)	November 24
Fresno State	28–17	#23 Boise State	November 25

== FCS team wins over FBS teams ==
Italics denotes FCS teams.

Date	Visiting team	Home team	Site	Result	Attendance	Ref.
August 31	Tennessee State	Georgia State	Georgia State Stadium • Atlanta, Georgia	17–10	24,333	
September 2	Howard	UNLV	Sam Boyd Stadium • Whitney, Nevada	43–40	15,667	
September 2	No. 1 (FCS) James Madison	East Carolina	Dowdy–Ficklen Stadium • Greenville, North Carolina	34–14	40,169	
September 2	Liberty	Baylor	McLane Stadium • Waco, Texas	48–45	45,784	
September 9	No. 12 (FCS) New Hampshire	Georgia Southern	Legion Field • Birmingham, Alabama	22–12	3,387	
September 9	South Dakota	Bowling Green	Doyt Perry Stadium • Bowling Green, Ohio	35–27	17,912	
September 16	Idaho State	Nevada	Mackay Stadium • Reno, Nevada	30–28	16,394	
September 16	No. 25 (FCS) North Carolina A&T	Charlotte	Jerry Richardson Stadium • Charlotte, North Carolina	35–31	18,651	
September 23	No. 19 (FCS) Western Illinois	Coastal Carolina	Brooks Stadium • Conway, South Carolina	52–10	14,996	
^{#}Rankings from AP Poll released prior to game.

== Conference standings ==
2017 American Athletic Conference football standings
	Conf.			Overall
Team	W		L	W		L
East Division
No. 6 UCF xy$	8	–	0	13	–	0
No. 21 South Florida	6	–	2	10	–	2
Temple	4	–	4	7	–	6
Cincinnati	2	–	6	4	–	8
UConn	2	–	6	3	–	9
East Carolina	2	–	6	3	–	9
West Division
No. 25 Memphis xy	7	–	1	10	–	3
Houston	5	–	3	7	–	5
Navy	4	–	4	7	–	6
SMU	4	–	4	7	–	6
Tulane	3	–	5	5	–	7
Tulsa	1	–	7	2	–	10
Championship: UCF 62, Memphis 55
$ – Conference champion; x – Division champion/co-champions; y – Championship game participant; As of January 9, 2018; Rankings from AP Poll.

2017 Atlantic Coast Conference football standings
	Conf.			Overall
Team	W		L	W		L
Atlantic Division
No. 4 Clemson xy$^	7	–	1	12	–	2
No. 23 NC State	6	–	2	9	–	4
Wake Forest	4	–	4	8	–	5
Louisville	4	–	4	8	–	5
Boston College	4	–	4	7	–	6
Florida State	3	–	5	7	–	6
Syracuse	2	–	6	4	–	8
Coastal Division
No. 13 Miami (FL) xy	7	–	1	10	–	3
No. 24 Virginia Tech	5	–	3	9	–	4
Georgia Tech	4	–	4	5	–	6
Virginia	3	–	5	6	–	7
Pittsburgh	3	–	5	5	–	7
Duke	3	–	5	7	–	6
North Carolina	1	–	7	3	–	9
Championship: Clemson 38, Miami 3
^ – College Football Playoff participant; $ – Conference champion; x – Division champion/co-champions; y – Championship game participant; Rankings from AP Poll

2017 Big Ten Conference football standings
	Conf.			Overall
Team	W		L	W		L
East Division
No. 5 Ohio State xy$	8	–	1	12	–	2
No. 15 Michigan State	7	–	2	10	–	3
No. 8 Penn State	7	–	2	11	–	2
Michigan	5	–	4	8	–	5
Rutgers	3	–	6	4	–	8
Indiana	2	–	7	5	–	7
Maryland	2	–	7	4	–	8
West Division
No. 7 Wisconsin xy	9	–	0	13	–	1
No. 17 Northwestern	7	–	2	10	–	3
Iowa	4	–	5	8	–	5
Purdue	4	–	5	7	–	6
Nebraska	3	–	6	4	–	8
Minnesota	2	–	7	5	–	7
Illinois	0	–	9	2	–	10
Championship: Ohio State 27, Wisconsin 21
$ – Conference champion; x – Division champion/co-champions; y – Championship game participant; Rankings from AP Poll

2017 Big 12 Conference football standings
	Conf.			Overall
Team	W		L	W		L
No. 3 Oklahoma y$^	8	–	1	12	–	2
No. 9 TCU y	7	–	2	11	–	3
No. 14 Oklahoma State	6	–	3	10	–	3
Texas	5	–	4	7	–	6
West Virginia	5	–	4	7	–	6
Kansas State	5	–	4	8	–	5
Iowa State	5	–	4	8	–	5
Texas Tech	3	–	6	6	–	7
Baylor	1	–	8	1	–	11
Kansas	0	–	9	1	–	11
Championship: Oklahoma 41, TCU 17
^ – College Football Playoff participant; $ – Conference champion; y – Championship game participant; Rankings from AP Poll

2017 Conference USA football standings
	Conf.			Overall
Team	W		L	W		L
East Division
Florida Atlantic x$	8	–	0	11	–	3
FIU	5	–	3	8	–	5
Marshall	4	–	4	8	–	5
Middle Tennessee	4	–	4	7	–	6
Western Kentucky	4	–	4	6	–	7
Old Dominion	3	–	5	5	–	7
Charlotte	1	–	7	1	–	11
West Division
North Texas x	7	–	1	9	–	5
Southern Miss	6	–	2	8	–	5
UAB	6	–	2	8	–	5
Louisiana Tech	4	–	4	7	–	6
UTSA	3	–	5	6	–	5
Rice	1	–	7	1	–	11
UTEP	0	–	8	0	–	12
Championship: Florida Atlantic 41, North Texas 17
$ – Conference champion; x – Division champion/co-champions; Rankings from AP Poll

2017 Mid-American Conference football standings
	Conf.			Overall
Team	W		L	W		L
East Division
Akron xy	6	–	2	7	–	7
Ohio	5	–	3	9	–	4
Miami (OH)	4	–	4	5	–	7
Buffalo	4	–	4	6	–	6
Bowling Green	2	–	6	2	–	10
Kent State	1	–	7	2	–	10
West Division
Toledo xy$	7	–	1	11	–	3
Central Michigan	6	–	2	8	–	5
Northern Illinois	6	–	2	8	–	5
Western Michigan	4	–	4	6	–	6
Eastern Michigan	3	–	5	5	–	7
Ball State	0	–	8	2	–	10
Championship: Toledo 45, Akron 28
$ – Conference champion; x – Division champion/co-champions; y – Championship game participant

2017 Mountain West Conference football standings
	Conf.			Overall
Team	W		L	W		L
Mountain Division
No. 22 Boise State xy$	7	–	1	11	–	3
Colorado State	5	–	3	7	–	6
Wyoming	5	–	3	8	–	5
Utah State	4	–	4	6	–	7
Air Force	4	–	4	5	–	7
New Mexico	1	–	7	3	–	9
West Division
Fresno State xy	7	–	1	10	–	4
San Diego State	6	–	2	10	–	3
UNLV	4	–	4	5	–	7
Nevada	3	–	5	3	–	9
Hawaii	1	–	7	3	–	9
San Jose State	1	–	7	2	–	11
Championship: Boise State 17, Fresno State 14
$ – Conference champion; x – Division champion/co-champions; y – Championship game participant; Rankings from AP Poll

2017 Pac-12 Conference football standings
	Conf.			Overall
Team	W		L	W		L
North Division
No. 20 Stanford xy	7	–	2	9	–	5
No. 16 Washington x	7	–	2	10	–	3
Washington State	6	–	3	9	–	4
Oregon	4	–	5	7	–	6
California	2	–	7	5	–	7
Oregon State	0	–	9	1	–	11
South Division
No. 12 USC xy$	8	–	1	11	–	3
Arizona State	6	–	3	7	–	6
Arizona	5	–	4	7	–	6
UCLA	4	–	5	6	–	7
Utah	3	–	6	7	–	6
Colorado	2	–	7	5	–	7
Championship: USC 31, Stanford 28
$ – Conference champion; x – Division champion/co-champions; y – Championship game participant; Rankings from AP Poll

2017 Southeastern Conference football standings
	Conf.			Overall
Team	W		L	W		L
Eastern Division
No. 2 Georgia x$^	7	–	1	13	–	2
South Carolina	5	–	3	9	–	4
Kentucky	4	–	4	7	–	6
Missouri	4	–	4	7	–	6
Florida	3	–	5	4	–	7
Vanderbilt	1	–	7	5	–	7
Tennessee	0	–	8	4	–	8
Western Division
No. 10 Auburn xy	7	–	1	10	–	4
No. 1 Alabama x#^	7	–	1	13	–	1
No. 18 LSU	6	–	2	9	–	4
No. 19 Mississippi State	4	–	4	9	–	4
Texas A&M	4	–	4	7	–	6
Ole Miss*	3	–	5	6	–	6
Arkansas	1	–	7	4	–	8
Championship: Georgia 28, Auburn 7
# – College Football Playoff champion; ^ – College Football Playoff participant; $ – Conference champion; x – Division champion/co-champions; y – Championship game participant; * Ole Miss ineligible for postseason due to NCAA sanctions; Rankings from AP Poll

2017 Sun Belt Conference football standings
	Conf.			Overall
Team	W		L	W		L
Troy +	7	–	1	11	–	2
Appalachian State +	7	–	1	9	–	4
Arkansas State	6	–	2	7	–	5
Georgia State	5	–	3	7	–	5
New Mexico State	4	–	4	7	–	6
Louisiana	4	–	4	5	–	7
Louisiana–Monroe	4	–	4	4	–	8
Idaho	3	–	5	4	–	8
South Alabama	3	–	5	4	–	8
Coastal Carolina *	2	–	6	3	–	9
Georgia Southern	2	–	6	2	–	10
Texas State	1	–	7	2	–	10
+ – Conference co-champions; * – Ineligible for postseason play due to FCS-to-FBS transition rules

2017 NCAA Division I FBS independents football records
	Conf.			Overall
Team	W		L	W		L
Army		–		10	–	3
No. 11 Notre Dame		–		10	–	3
UMass		–		4	–	8
BYU		–		4	–	9
Rankings from AP Poll

== Conference summaries ==
Through the 2015 season, conferences were required to have a minimum of 12 members to play a conference championship game that was exempt from the NCAA limit of 12 regular-season games. The NCAA removed this requirement effective with the 2016 season. At that time, all FBS conferences except the Big 12 and Sun Belt Conferences held season-ending championship games. With the Big 12 reinstating its championship game for the 2017 season, only the Sun Belt Conference determines its champion solely by regular-season records, and that conference will launch a championship game in 2018.

Conference	Champion	Runner-up	Score	Offensive Player of the Year	Defensive Player of the Year	Coach of the Year
American	No. 14 UCF (East)	#20 Memphis (West)	62–55	McKenzie Milton, UCF	Ed Oliver, Houston	Scott Frost, UCF
ACC	#1 Clemson (Atlantic)	#7 Miami (Coastal)	38-3	Lamar Jackson, Louisville	Bradley Chubb, NC State	Mark Richt, Miami
Big 12	#3 Oklahoma	#11 TCU (#2 seed)	41–17	Baker Mayfield, Oklahoma	Ogbo Okoronkwo, Oklahoma; Malik Jefferson, Texas	Matt Campbell, Iowa State
Big Ten	#8 Ohio State (East)	#4 Wisconsin (West)	27–21	Saquon Barkley, Penn State	Josey Jewell, Iowa	Paul Chryst, Wisconsin
C-USA	Florida Atlantic (East)	North Texas (West)	41-17			
MAC	Toledo (West)	Akron (East)	45–28	Logan Woodside, Toledo	Sutton Smith, Northern Illinois	Jason Candle, Toledo
MW	Boise State (Mountain)	#25 Fresno State (West)	17–14	Rashaad Penny, San Diego State	Leighton Vander, Boise State	Jeff Tedford, Fresno State
Pac-12	#11 USC (South)	#14 Stanford (North)	31–28			
SEC	#6 Georgia (East)	#2 Auburn (West)	28–7			
Sun Belt			N/A			

== Bowl eligibility ==
For the 39 post-season bowl games, teams should be bowl eligible to be selected. Normally, this requires a team to have a minimum of a 0.500 winning percentage. If there are not be enough winning teams to fulfill all open bowl slots, teams with losing records could be chosen in order to fill all 78 slots. Additionally, in the rare occasions where a conference champion does not meet eligibility requirements, they are usually still chosen for bowl games with tie-ins for that conference champion.

=== Bowl eligible teams ===
- American Athletic Conference (7): Houston, Memphis, Navy, South Florida, SMU, Temple, UCF
- Atlantic Coast Conference (9): Boston College, Clemson, Duke, Florida St, Louisville, Miami, North Carolina State, Virginia, Virginia Tech, Wake Forest
- Big 12 Conference (8): Iowa State, Kansas State, Oklahoma, Oklahoma State, Texas, Texas Tech, TCU, West Virginia
- Big Ten Conference (8): Iowa, Michigan, Michigan State, Northwestern, Ohio State, Penn State, Purdue, Wisconsin
- Conference USA (10): Florida Atlantic, FIU, Louisiana Tech, Marshall, Middle Tennessee, North Texas, Southern Miss, UAB, Western Kentucky, UTSA
- Independents (2): Army, Notre Dame
- Mid-American Conference (7): Akron, Buffalo, Central Michigan, Northern Illinois, Ohio, Toledo, Western Michigan
- Mountain West Conference (6): Boise State, Colorado State, Fresno State, San Diego State, Utah State, Wyoming
- Pac-12 Conference (9): Arizona, Arizona State, Oregon, Stanford, UCLA, USC, Utah, Washington, Washington State
- Southeastern Conference (9): Alabama, Auburn, Georgia, Kentucky, LSU, Mississippi State, Missouri, South Carolina, Texas A&M
- Sun Belt Conference (5): Appalachian State, Arkansas State, Georgia State, New Mexico St, Troy

Total: 81

=== Bowl ineligible teams ===
- The American (5): Cincinnati, UConn, East Carolina, Tulane, Tulsa
- ACC (4): North Carolina, Georgia Tech, Pittsburgh, Syracuse
- Big Ten (6): Illinois, Indiana, Maryland, Minnesota, Nebraska, Rutgers
- Big 12 (2): Baylor, Kansas
- Conference USA (4): Charlotte, Old Dominion, Rice, Texas-El Paso
- Independent (2): BYU, UMass
- MAC (5): Ball State, Bowling Green, Eastern Michigan, Kent State, Miami (OH)
- Mountain West (6): Air Force, Hawaii, Nevada, New Mexico, San Jose State, UNLV
- Pac-12 (3): California, Colorado, Oregon State
- SEC (5): Arkansas, Mississippi (self-imposed ban), Tennessee, Vanderbilt, Florida
- Sun Belt (6): Coastal Carolina, Georgia Southern, Idaho, Louisiana–Monroe, South Alabama, Texas State
- Independent (2): BYU, UMass

Total: 49

== Coaching changes ==
=== Preseason and in-season ===
This is restricted to coaching changes taking place on or after May 1, 2017. For coaching changes that occurred earlier in 2017, see 2016 NCAA Division I FBS end-of-season coaching changes.

School	Outgoing coach	Date	Reason	Replacement
Oklahoma	Bob Stoops	June 7, 2017	Retired	Lincoln Riley
Ole Miss	Hugh Freeze	July 20, 2017	Resigned	Matt Luke (Note: Interim for remainder of season; interim tag removed on November 26, 2017.)
Coastal Carolina	Joe Moglia	July 28, 2017	Medical leave	Jamey Chadwell (interim)
UTEP	Sean Kugler	October 1, 2017	Resigned	Mike Price (interim)
Oregon State	Gary Andersen	October 9, 2017	Resigned	Cory Hall (interim)
Georgia Southern	Tyson Summers	October 22, 2017	Fired	Chad Lunsford (Note: Interim for remainder of season; interim tag removed on November 27, 2017.)
Florida	Jim McElwain	October 29, 2017	Fired	Randy Shannon (interim)
Tennessee	Butch Jones	November 12, 2017	Fired	Brady Hoke (Interim)
UCLA	Jim Mora	November 19, 2017	Fired	Jedd Fisch (Interim)

=== End of season ===
This list includes coaching changes announced during the season that did not take effect until the end of the season.

School	Outgoing coach	Date	Reason	Replacement
South Alabama	Joey Jones	November 20, 2017	Resigned	Steve Campbell
Kent State	Paul Haynes	November 22, 2017	Fired	Colin Ferrell (Interim)
Arkansas	Bret Bielema	November 24, 2017	Fired	Chad Morris
UCLA	Jedd Fisch (interim)	November 25, 2017	Permanent replacement	Chip Kelly
Nebraska	Mike Riley	November 25, 2017	Fired	Scott Frost
Arizona State	Todd Graham	November 26, 2017	Agreed to part ways	Herm Edwards
Florida	Randy Shannon (interim)	November 26, 2017	Permanent replacement	Dan Mullen
Mississippi State	Dan Mullen	November 26, 2017	Hired by Florida	Joe Moorhead
Rice	David Bailiff	November 27, 2017	Fired	Mike Bloomgren
Texas A&M	Kevin Sumlin	November 27, 2017	Fired	Jimbo Fisher
Oregon State	Cory Hall (interim)	November 30, 2017	Permanent replacement	Jonathan Smith
UCF	Scott Frost	December 2, 2017	Hired by Nebraska	Josh Heupel
Louisiana	Mark Hudspeth	December 2, 2017	Fired	Billy Napier
Florida State	Odell Haggins (interim)	December 5, 2017	Permanent replacement	Willie Taggart
Oregon	Willie Taggart	December 5, 2017	Hired by Florida State	Mario Cristobal
Arkansas	Paul Rhoads (Interim)	December 6, 2017	Permanent replacement	Chad Morris
UTEP	Mike Price	December 6, 2017	Permanent replacement	Dana Dimel
Tennessee	Brady Hoke (interim)	December 7, 2017	Permanent replacement	Jeremy Pruitt
SMU	Jeff Traylor (interim)	December 12, 2017	Permanent replacement	Sonny Dykes
Kent State	Colin Ferrell (interim)	December 21, 2017	Permanent replacement	Sean Lewis
Arizona	Rich Rodriguez	January 2, 2018	Fired	Kevin Sumlin
Coastal Carolina	Jamey Chadwell (interim)	January 5, 2018	Medical clearance of head coach	Joe Moglia

== Awards and honors ==
=== Heisman Trophy voting ===
The Heisman Trophy is given to the year's most outstanding player

Player	School	Position	1st	2nd	3rd	Total
Baker Mayfield	Oklahoma	QB	732	87	28	2,398
Bryce Love	Stanford	RB	75	421	233	1,300
Lamar Jackson	Louisville	QB	47	197	258	793
Saquon Barkley	Penn State	RB	15	73	113	304
Rashaad Penny	San Diego State	RB	7	37	80	175
Jonathan Taylor	Wisconsin	RB	2	7	38	58
Mason Rudolph	Oklahoma State	QB	2	14	22	56
McKenzie Milton	UCF	QB	4	11	20	54
Kerryon Johnson	Auburn	RB	0	14	17	45
Roquan Smith	Georgia	LB	3	11	7	38

=== Other overall ===
- Archie Griffin Award (MVP): Finalists:
- AP Player of the Year: Finalists:
- Chic Harley Award (Player of the Year): Finalists:
- Maxwell Award (top player): Finalists:
  - Saquon Barkley, Penn State
  - Bryce Love, Stanford
  - Baker Mayfield, Oklahoma
- SN Player of the Year: Finalists:
- Walter Camp Award (top player): Finalists:

=== Special overall ===
- Burlsworth Trophy (top player who began as walk-on): Finalists:
- Paul Hornung Award (most versatile player): Finalists:
- Campbell Trophy ("academic Heisman"): Finalists:
  - Sam Benger, Carnegie Mellon (DIII)
  - Braxton Berrios, Miami
  - Mason Hampton, Boise State
  - Justin Jackson, Northwestern
  - Micah Kiser, Virginia
  - Justin Lea, Jacksonville State (FCS)
  - Brad Lundblade, Oklahoma State
  - Marcus Martin, Slippery Rock (DII)
  - Chandon Sullivan, Georgia State
  - Blaise Taylor, Arkansas State
  - Marlon Walls, Stephen F. Austin (FCS)
  - Chris Weber, Nebraska
  - Jake Wieneke, South Dakota State (FCS)
- Wuerffel Trophy (humanitarian-athlete): Finalists:
  - Blaise Taylor, Arkansas State
  - Courtney Love, Kentucky
  - Drue Tranquill, Notre Dame
- POLY POY (Polynesian College Football Player of the Year): Finalists:

=== Offense ===
Quarterback

- Davey O'Brien Award (quarterback): Finalists:
  - J. T. Barrett, Ohio State
  - Baker Mayfield, Oklahoma
  - Mason Rudolph, Oklahoma State
- Johnny Unitas Award (senior/4th year quarterback): Finalists:
- Kellen Moore Award (quarterback):
- Manning Award (quarterback): Finalists:
- Sammy Baugh Trophy (passing quarterback): Finalists:

Running back

- Doak Walker Award (running back): Finalists:
  - Saquon Barkley, Penn State
  - Bryce Love, Stanford
  - Jonathan Taylor, Wisconsin
- Jim Brown Trophy (running back): Finalists:

Wide receiver

- Fred Biletnikoff Award (wide receiver): Finalists:
  - Michael Gallup, Colorado State
  - David Sills V, West Virginia
  - James Washington, Oklahoma State

Tight end

- John Mackey Award (tight end): Finalists:
  - Mark Andrews, Oklahoma
  - Troy Fumagalli, Wisconsin
  - Mike Gesicki, Penn State

Lineman

- Dave Rimington Trophy (center): Finalists:

=== Defense ===
- Bronko Nagurski Trophy (defensive player): Finalists:
  - Bradley Chubb, NC State
  - Minkah Fitzpatrick, Alabama
  - Josey Jewell, Iowa
  - Ed Oliver, Houston
  - Roquan Smith, Georgia
- Chuck Bednarik Award (defensive player): Finalists:
  - Bradley Chubb, NC State
  - Minkah Fitzpatrick, Alabama
  - Roquan Smith, Georgia
- Lott Trophy (defensive impact): Finalists:

Defensive line

- Bill Willis Award (defensive lineman): Finalists:
- Dick Butkus Award (linebacker): Finalists:
  - Devin Bush Jr., Michigan
  - Tremaine Edmunds, Virginia Tech
  - T. J. Edwards, Wisconsin
  - Dorian O'Daniel, Clemson
  - Roquan Smith, Georgia
- Jack Lambert Trophy (linebacker): Finalists:
- Ted Hendricks Award (defensive end): Finalists:

Defensive back

- Paycom Jim Thorpe Award (defensive back): Finalists:
  - DeShon Elliott, Texas
  - Minkah Fitzpatrick, Alabama
  - Josh Jackson, Iowa
- Jack Tatum Trophy (defensive back): Finalists:

=== Special teams ===
- Lou Groza Award (placekicker): Finalists:
  - Daniel Carlson, Auburn
  - Dominik Eberle, Utah State
  - Matt Gay, Utah
- Ray Guy Award (punter): Finalists:
  - Michael Dickson, Texas
  - J. K. Scott, Alabama
  - Mitch Wishnowsky, Utah

=== Other positional awards ===
- Outland Trophy (interior lineman on either offense or defense): Finalists:
  - Orlando Brown, Oklahoma
  - Quenton Nelson, Notre Dame
  - Ed Oliver, Houston

== Television viewers and ratings ==
=== Most watched regular season games ===
Rank	Date	Matchup				Network	Viewers (millions)	TV Rating	Significance
1	November 25, 3:30 ET	#1 Alabama	14	#6 Auburn	26	CBS	13.66	7.6	Iron Bowl/College GameDay
2	September 2, 8:00 ET	#3 Florida State	7	#1 Alabama	24	ABC	12.34	6.9	Chick-fil-A Kickoff Game/College GameDay
3	November 25, 12:00 ET	Michigan	20	#9 Ohio State	31	FOX	10.51	6.1	The Game
4	October 28, 3:30 ET	#2 Penn State	38	#6 Ohio State	39	FOX	9.87	5.7	Rivalry/College GameDay
5	September 9, 7:30 ET	#5 Oklahoma	31	#2 Ohio State	16	ABC	8.08	4.6	College GameDay
6	September 2, 3:30 ET	#11 Michigan	33	#17 Florida	17	ABC	7.65	4.9	Advocare Classic
7	November 11, 3:30 ET	#1 Georgia	17	#10 Auburn	40	CBS	7.41	4.4	Deep South's Oldest Rivalry
8	November 11, 7:00 ET	#2 Alabama	31	#16 Mississippi State	24	ESPN	7.03	3.9	Rivalry
9	October 21, 7:30 ET	#19 Michigan	13	#2 Penn State	42	ABC	6.95	3.9	College GameDay
10	November 4, 8:00 ET	#19 LSU	10	#2 Alabama	24	CBS	6.73	3.9	Rivalry

=== Conference championship games ===
Rank	Date	Matchup		Network	Viewers	TV Rating	Conference	Location
	December 1, 8:00 ET	#12 Stanford (North)	#10 USC (South)	ESPN			Pac-12	Levi's Stadium, Santa Clara, CA
	December 2, 4:00 ET	#6 Georgia (East)	#2 Auburn (West)	CBS			SEC	Mercedes-Benz Stadium, Atlanta, GA
	December 2, 8:00 ET	#8 Ohio State (East)	#4 Wisconsin (West)	FOX			Big Ten	Lucas Oil Stadium, Indianapolis, IN
	December 2, 8:00 ET	#7 Miami (Coastal)	#1 Clemson (Atlantic)	ABC			ACC	Bank of America Stadium, Charlotte, NC
	December 2, 12:30 ET	#11 TCU (#2 seed)	#3 Oklahoma (#1 seed)	FOX			Big 12	AT&T Stadium, Arlington, TX
	December 2, 12:00 ET	#20 Memphis (West)	#14 UCF (East)	ABC			AAC	Spectrum Stadium, Orlando, FL
	December 2, 12:00 ET	Akron (East)	Toledo (West)	ESPN			MAC	Ford Field, Detroit, MI
	December 2, 12:00 ET	North Texas (West)	Florida Atlantic (East)	ESPN2			C-USA	FAU Stadium, Boca Raton, FL
	December 2, 7:45 ET	#25 Fresno State (West)	Boise State (Mountain)	ESPN			MW	Albertsons Stadium, Boise, ID

== Attendances ==
Team	G	Total	Average
Air Force	6	174,924	29,154
Akron	6	117,416	19,569
Alabama	7	712,053	101,722
Appalachian State	6	154,722	25,787
Arizona	6	255,791	42,632
Arizona State	7	359,660	51,380
Arkansas	7	442,569	63,224
Arkansas State	5	119,538	23,908
Army West Point	6	185,543	30,924
Auburn	7	605,120	86,446
Ball State	6	59,395	9,899
Baylor	6	262,978	43,830
Boise State	7	217,881	31,126
Boston College	6	215,546	35,924
Bowling Green	5	79,405	15,881
Buffalo	6	80,102	13,350
BYU	6	337,599	56,267
California	6	219,290	36,548
Central Michigan	5	67,520	13,504
Charlotte	6	71,420	11,903
Cincinnati	6	170,603	28,434
Clemson	7	565,412	80,773
Colorado	6	282,335	47,056
Colorado State	6	192,369	32,062
Duke	7	187,581	26,797
East Carolina	7	257,090	36,727
Eastern Michigan	5	73,649	14,730
FIU	7	100,002	14,286
Florida Atlantic	8	151,580	18,948
Florida	6	520,290	86,715
Florida State	6	425,658	70,943
Fresno State	6	183,789	30,632
Georgia Southern	4	61,031	15,258
Georgia	6	556,476	92,746
Georgia State	5	79,163	15,833
Georgia Tech	6	281,310	46,885
Hawaii	6	145,463	24,244
Houston	6	195,499	32,583
Idaho	6	63,197	10,533
Illinois	7	276,003	39,429
Indiana	6	263,715	43,953
Iowa	7	464,357	66,337
Iowa State	6	347,586	57,931
Kansas	7	186,490	26,641
Kansas State	7	359,107	51,301
Kent State	5	65,924	13,185
Kentucky	7	395,276	56,468
Louisiana–Monroe	5	49,640	9,928
Louisiana	5	78,754	15,751
Louisiana Tech	7	142,626	20,375
Louisville	6	276,957	46,160
LSU	6	591,034	98,506
Marshall	6	130,447	21,741
Maryland	6	237,859	39,643
Massachusetts	6	64,242	10,707
Memphis	8	290,416	36,302
Miami Hurricanes	8	469,454	58,682
Miami RedHawks	6	98,666	16,444
Michigan	6	669,534	111,589
Michigan State	7	507,398	72,485
Middle Tennessee	6	93,718	15,620
Minnesota	7	310,506	44,358
Mississippi State	7	406,703	58,100
Missouri	7	360,429	51,490
Navy	6	209,701	34,950
NC State	6	341,100	56,850
Nebraska	7	628,583	89,798
Nevada	6	100,329	16,722
New Mexico	6	127,161	21,194
New Mexico State	5	91,195	18,239
North Carolina	7	350,500	50,071
North Texas	6	134,174	22,362
Northern Illinois	6	67,748	11,291
Northwestern	7	250,969	35,853
Notre Dame	7	543,354	77,622
Ohio	6	116,325	19,388
Ohio State	7	752,464	107,495
Oklahoma	6	519,119	86,520
Oklahoma State	6	340,740	56,790
Old Dominion	6	120,708	20,118
Ole Miss	7	410,414	58,631
Oregon	7	388,381	55,483
Oregon State	6	208,524	34,754
Penn State	7	746,946	106,707
Pittsburgh	7	254,062	36,295
Purdue	6	287,303	47,884
Rice	5	96,770	19,354
Rutgers	7	278,245	39,749
San Diego State	7	275,428	39,347
San Jose State	6	85,235	14,206
SMU	7	139,609	19,944
South Alabama	6	104,070	17,345
South Carolina	7	550,099	78,586
South Florida	6	188,408	31,401
Southern California	7	508,781	72,683
Southern Miss	6	130,265	21,711
Stanford	6	284,388	47,398
Syracuse	7	237,504	33,929
TCU	6	264,481	44,080
Temple	6	163,905	27,318
Tennessee	7	670,454	95,779
Texas	6	556,667	92,778
Texas A&M	7	691,612	98,802
Texas State	6	104,680	17,447
Texas Tech	6	330,390	55,065
Toledo	6	124,470	20,745
Troy	6	146,737	24,456
Tulane	6	101,634	16,939
Tulsa	6	110,751	18,459
UAB	6	158,252	26,375
UCF	7	257,924	36,846
UCLA	6	336,262	56,044
UConn	6	122,007	20,335
UNLV	6	104,692	17,449
Utah	7	321,390	45,913
Utah State	6	120,650	20,108
UTEP	5	97,740	19,548
UTSA	5	114,104	22,821
Vanderbilt	7	219,390	31,341
Virginia	7	275,788	39,398
Virginia Tech	6	379,284	63,214
Wake Forest	6	170,614	28,436
Washington	7	481,755	68,822
Washington State	7	223,875	31,982
West Virginia	6	335,678	55,946
Western Kentucky	6	94,234	15,706
Western Michigan	6	95,314	15,886
Wisconsin	7	551,766	78,824
Wyoming	7	144,299	20,614

== See also ==
- 2017 NCAA Division I FCS football season
- 2017 NCAA Division II football season
- 2017 NCAA Division III football season
- 2017 NAIA football season-
