= Rashaad Penny =

American football player (born 1996)

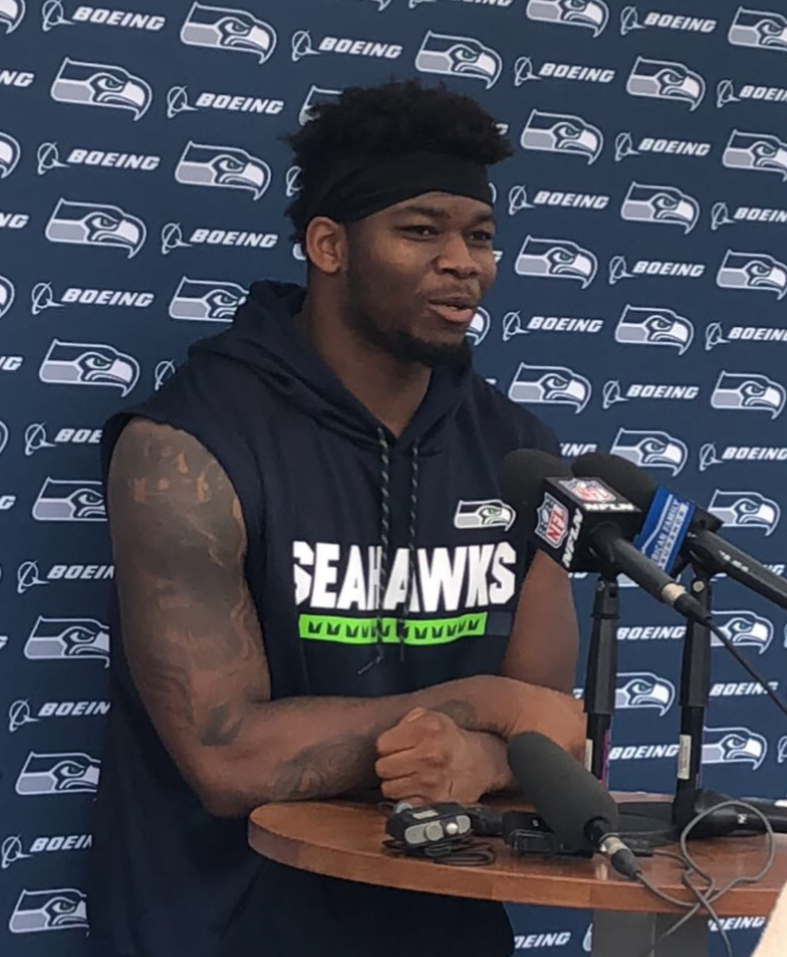
- Penny in 2018

No. 20, 23
- Position: Running back

Personal information
- Born: February 2, 1996 (age 30); Norwalk, California, U.S.
- Listed height: 5 ft 11 in (1.80 m)
- Listed weight: 220 lb (100 kg)

Career information
- High school: Norwalk
- College: San Diego State (2014–2017)
- NFL draft: 2018: 1st round, 27th overall pick

Career history

Playing
- Seattle Seahawks (2018–2022); Philadelphia Eagles (2023); Carolina Panthers (2024)*
- * Offseason or practice squad member only

Coaching
- Long Beach Jordan (CA) (2026–present) Head coach

Awards and highlights
- Consensus All-American (2017); NCAA rushing yards leader (2017); MW Male Athlete of the Year (2017); MW Offensive Player of the Year (2017); 3× MW Special Teams Player of the Year (2015–2017); 3× First-team All-MWC (2015–2017) (Note: Selected as running back and return specialist in 2017.); NCAA (FBS) record: Career kickoff return touchdowns: 7 (Note: Tied with Tyron Carrier, Savon Scarver, Tony Pollard, and C. J. Spiller.)

Career NFL statistics
- Rushing yards: 1,951
- Rushing average: 5.6
- Rushing touchdowns: 13
- Receptions: 28
- Receiving yards: 227
- Receiving touchdowns: 1
- Stats at Pro Football Reference

Rashaad Armein Penny (born February 2, 1996) is an American former professional football player who was a running back for six seasons in the National Football League (NFL), primarily with the Seattle Seahawks. He played college football for the San Diego State Aztecs and was selected by the Seahawks in the first round of the 2018 NFL draft. After five seasons with the Seahawks, Penny spent one season with the Philadelphia Eagles before retiring in 2024.

== Early life ==
Penny attended and played high school football at Norwalk High School. He had a very productive senior season as he rushed for 2,504 yards and 41 rushing touchdowns on 216 carries and caught 21 passes for 665 receiving yards and 10 receiving touchdowns. He committed to play college football at SDSU over offers from Boise State, Colorado State, Fresno State, Nevada, San Jose State, and Utah State.

== College career ==
Penny played college football for the San Diego State Aztecs from 2014 to 2017. During the 2016 season, Penny rushed for 1,018 yards on 136 carries for an average of 7.5 yards per carry.

As a senior in 2017, Penny rushed for 216 yards and 12.0 yards per carry against Arizona State and 175 yards and 5.5 yards per carry against Stanford. On September 25, 2017, he received the Mountain West Conference Offensive Player of the Week award for the fourth consecutive week. During the 2017 regular season, he ranked first among all Division I FBS players with 2,248 rushing yards and was named Mountain West Conference Male Athlete of the Year.

Penny is tied for the most kickoff return touchdowns in NCAA Division I history with 7.

== Professional career ==
Pre-draft measurables
Height	Weight	Arm length	Hand span	40-yard dash	10-yard split	20-yard split	Vertical jump	Broad jump	Bench press
5 ft 11 in (1.80 m)	220 lb (100 kg)	31 1/4 in (0.79 m)	9 1/4 in (0.23 m)	4.46 s	1.58 s	2.63 s	32 1/2 in (0.83 m)	10 ft 0 in (3.05 m)	13 reps
All values from NFL Combine

=== Seattle Seahawks ===
Penny was selected by the Seattle Seahawks with the 27th overall pick in the first round of the 2018 NFL draft. On May 16, 2018, Penny signed a four-year deal worth $10.7 million featuring a $5.9 million signing bonus. He made his NFL debut in the Seahawks' 27–24 loss to the Denver Broncos in the season opener. He had seven carries for eight yards to go along with four receptions for 35 yards. In a Week 10 loss to the Los Angeles Rams, Penny had a breakout game with 12 carries for 108 yards and a touchdown. Overall, he finished his rookie season with 419 rushing yards and two rushing touchdowns. The Seahawks made the playoffs as the #5-seed and faced off against the Dallas Cowboys in the Wild Card Round. In the 24–22 loss, Penny had four carries for 29 rushing yards.

In Week 2 of the 2019 season against the Pittsburgh Steelers, Penny rushed 10 times for 62 yards and his first rushing touchdown of the season as the Seahawks won 28–26. During Week 12 against the Philadelphia Eagles, Penny finished with 129 rushing yards and a touchdown as the Seahawks won 17–9. In Week 13 against the Minnesota Vikings on Monday Night Football, Penny rushed 15 times for 74 yards and a touchdown and caught four passes for 33 yards and a touchdown in the 37–30 win. In Week 14, Penny suffered a torn ACL and was ruled out the rest of the season. Overall, in the 2019 season, Penny appeared in 10 games and recorded 370 rushing yards and three rushing touchdowns along with eight receptions for 83 receiving yards and one receiving touchdown.

Penny was placed on the active/physically unable to perform list (PUP) at the start of training camp on August 3, 2020. He was moved to the reserve/PUP list at the start of the regular season on September 5, 2020. Penny was activated from the PUP list into the active roster on December 19, 2020. He appeared in three games in the 2020 season.

The Seahawks declined to exercise the fifth-year option on Penny's contract on May 3, 2021, making him a free agent after the 2021 season. He was placed on injured reserve on October 2, 2021. He was activated on October 25, 2021. In Week 14, Penny had a breakout game rushing 16 times for 137 yards and two touchdowns in a 33–13 win over the Houston Texans. In Week 16, Penny ran for 135 yards in the 25–24 loss to the Chicago Bears. In Week 17, Penny ran for 170 yards on 25 carries along with two touchdowns in a 51–29 win against the Detroit Lions, continuing his breakout set of games. For his game against Detroit, he won NFC Offensive Player of the Week. In Week 18, Penny rushed for a career-best 190 yards on 23 carries along with a rushing touchdown during an upset win over the Arizona Cardinals. Overall, Penny played in ten games rushing for 749 yards on 119 attempts, and six touchdowns, all career highs. He led in the NFL in yards per rushing attempt among qualified players with 6.3.

The Seahawks re-signed Penny on a one-year deal worth $5.7 million on March 20, 2022. In Week 4, against the Lions, Penny had 17 carries for 151 rushing yards and two rushing touchdowns in the 48–45 victory. In Week 5, Penny suffered a season-ending broken fibula in the 32–39 loss against the New Orleans Saints. He was placed on injured reserve on October 14, 2022.

=== Philadelphia Eagles ===
On March 15, 2023, Penny signed a one-year contract with the Eagles. He was originally seen as a replacement for running back Miles Sanders, who departed for the Carolina Panthers in free agency over the offseason. However, later in the offseason, the Eagles acquired D'Andre Swift from the Detroit Lions in a trade, and leading up to the 2023 season, Eagles head coach Nick Sirianni would not announce a starting running back, instead planning for a "committee approach" to the position, where Penny, Swift, Kenneth Gainwell, and Boston Scott would share carries. Despite this, Penny would end up seeing the least playing time, only appearing in three games throughout the season with 11 carries and a total of 33 yards.

=== Carolina Panthers ===
On May 6, 2024, Penny signed with the Carolina Panthers. On July 30, Penny was placed on the reserve/retired list by the Panthers.

== Coaching career ==
On May 12, 2026, Penny was named as the head football coach at Long Beach Jordan High School.

== Career statistics ==
=== NFL ===
Regular season
Year	Team	Games		Rushing						Receiving						Fumbles	
Year	Team	GP	GS	Att	Yds	Avg	Lng	TD	1D	Tgt	Rec	Yds	Avg	Lng	TD	Fum	Lost
2018	SEA	14	0	85	419	4.9	38	2	18	12	**9**	75	8.3	24	0	0	0
2019	SEA	10	0	65	370	5.7	58	3	16	11	8	**83**	**10.4**	**30**	**1**	**1**	0
2020	SEA	3	0	11	34	3.1	7	0	1	0	0	0	0	0	0	0	0
2021	SEA	10	6	**119**	**749**	**6.3**	**62**	**6**	**28**	8	6	48	8.0	27	0	0	0
2022	SEA	5	5	57	346	6.1	41	2	15	5	4	16	4.0	6	0	**1**	0
2023	PHI	3	0	11	33	3.0	7	0	1	1	1	5	5.0	5	0	0	0
Career		45	11	348	1,951	5.6	62	13	79	37	28	227	8.1	30	1	2	0

=== College ===
Legend
	NCAA record
	Led the NCAA
**Bold**	Career high

Season	Team	GP	Rushing					Receiving					Kickoff returns			
Season	Team	GP	Att	Yds	Avg	Lng	TD	Rec	Yds	Avg	Lng	TD	Ret	Yds	Avg	TD
2014	San Diego State	10	2	22	**11.0**	21	0	0	0	0.0	0	0	20	500	25.0	0
2015	San Diego State	14	61	368	6.0	55	4	8	120	**15.0**	33	1	**24**	**804**	**33.5**	**3**
2016	San Diego State	14	135	1,005	7.4	73	11	15	**224**	14.9	**41**	**3**	20	624	31.2	2
2017	San Diego State	13	**289**	**2,248**	7.8	**95**	**23**	**19**	135	7.1	33	2	17	521	30.6	2
Career		51	487	3,643	7.5	95	38	42	479	11.4	41	6	81	2,449	30.2	7

== Personal life ==
Penny has four siblings: Robert Jr., Elijhaa, Breonna, and Brionne. His parents are Desiree and Robert Penny. Penny's older brother Elijhaa is a retired NFL fullback.
