= Raven Greene =

American football player (born 1995)

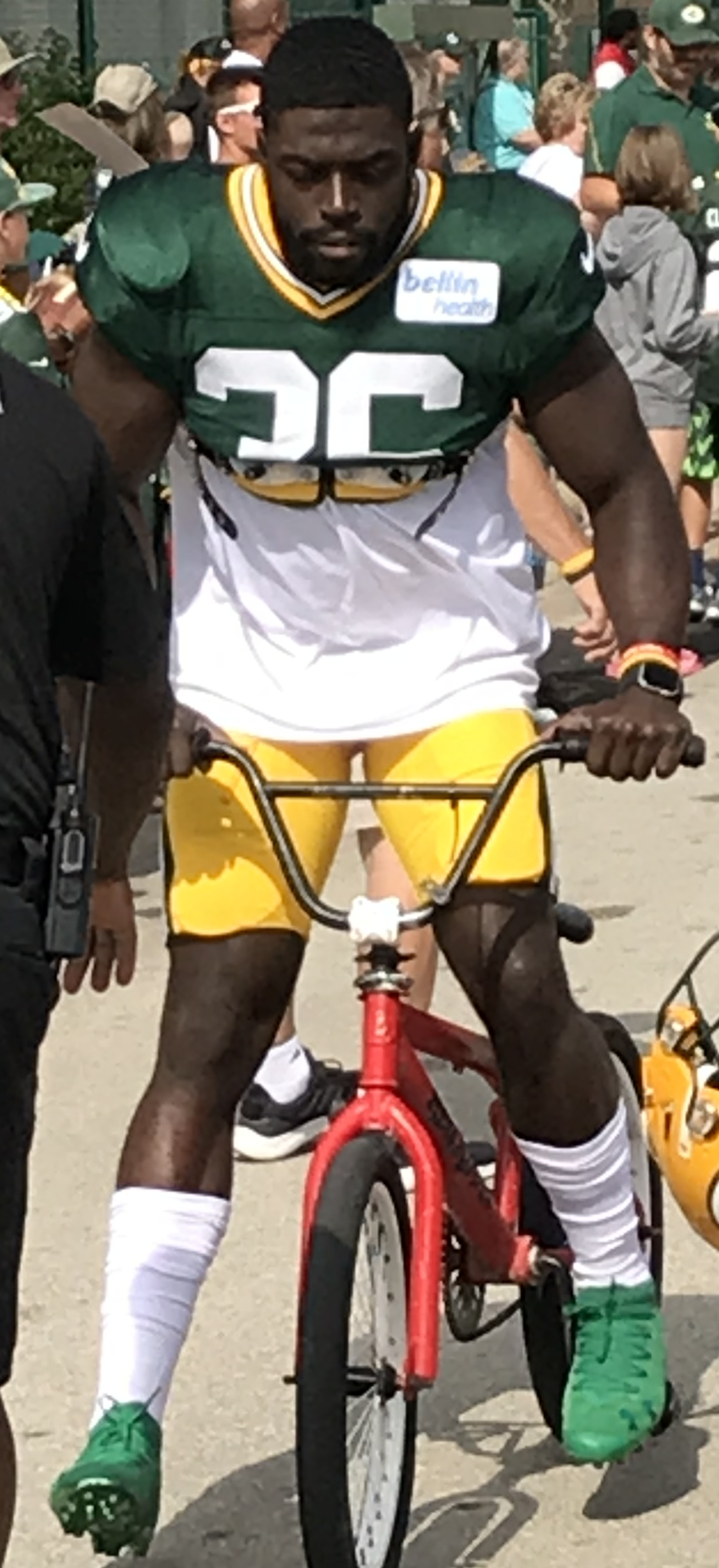
- Greene with the Green Bay Packers in 2019

No. 36, 24
- Position: Safety

Personal information
- Born: February 2, 1995 (age 31); Virginia Beach, Virginia, U.S.
- Listed height: 5 ft 11 in (1.80 m)
- Listed weight: 197 lb (89 kg)

Career information
- High school: First Colonial (Virginia Beach)
- College: James Madison
- NFL draft: 2018: undrafted

Career history
- Green Bay Packers (2018–2020); Tampa Bay Buccaneers (2021)*
- * Offseason or practice squad member only

Awards and highlights
- FCS national champion (2016); All-American STATS FCS Second Team All-American (2017); All-American STATS FCS Third Team All-American (2016); First team All-CAA (2017, 2016); Second team All-CAA (2015)

Career NFL statistics
- Total tackles: 52
- Forced fumbles: 2
- Fumble recoveries: 0
- Pass deflections: 7
- Interceptions: 1
- Sacks: 2.5
- Stats at Pro Football Reference

Raven Avery Greene (born February 2, 1995) is an American former professional football player who was a safety in the National Football League (NFL). He played college football for the James Madison Dukes and signed with the Green Bay Packers as an undrafted free agent in 2018.

== Early life ==
Greene attended and played high school football at First Colonial High School.

== College career ==
Greene played college football at James Madison University. He played in 58 games, recording 154 tackles with 34 passes broken up and 14 interceptions.

== Professional career ==
Pre-draft measurables
Height	Weight	Arm length	Hand span	40-yard dash	10-yard split	20-yard split	20-yard shuttle	Three-cone drill	Vertical jump	Broad jump	Bench press
5 ft 11 1/8 in (1.81 m)	197 lb (89 kg)	31 1/8 in (0.79 m)	9 7/8 in (0.25 m)	4.51 s	1.57 s	2.62 s	4.41 s	7.08 s	34.0 in (0.86 m)	9 ft 11 in (3.02 m)	14 reps
All values from James Madison's Pro Day

=== Green Bay Packers ===
On May 4, 2018, the Green Bay Packers signed Greene to a three-year, $1.71 million contract that includes a signing bonus of $3,500.

Throughout training camp, Greene competed against Jermaine Whitehead to be the primary backup free safety behind starter Ha Ha Clinton-Dix. Head coach Mike McCarthy named Greene the third free safety on the Packers’ depth chart to begin the regular season, behind Clinton-Dix and Whitehead.

Greene was inactive as a healthy scratch for the first two regular season games. On September 23, 2018, he made his professional regular season debut in a Week 3 loss to the Washington Redskins. On October 30, 2018, the Packers traded Clinton-Dix to the Redskins. As a result, Greene became the primary backup free safety behind Whitehead. The Packers placed Greene on injured reserve on December 8, 2018, with an ankle injury.

On September 16, 2019, Greene was placed on injured reserve with an ankle injury. He was designated for return from injured reserve on January 2, 2020, and began practicing with the team again. He was activated on January 18, 2020, prior to the National Football Conference Championship game.

In Week 9 of the 2020 season against the San Francisco 49ers on Thursday Night Football, Greene recorded his first career interception off a pass thrown by Nick Mullens during the 34–17 win. He was placed on injured reserve on December 9, 2020.

=== Tampa Bay Buccaneers ===
On May 5, 2021, Greene signed with the Tampa Bay Buccaneers. He was waived/injured on August 18, 2021, and placed on injured reserve. He was released on August 27.

== NFL career statistics ==
Regular season statistics
Year	Team	Games		Tackles				Interceptions						Fumbles	
Year	Team	GP	GS	Comb	Total	Ast	Sack	Int	Yards	Avg	Long	TD	PD	FF	FR
2018	GB	8	0	5	4	1	1.0	0	0	0	0	0	1	1	0
2019	GB	2	1	7	6	1	0.0	0	0	0	0	0	1	0	0
2020	GB	10	0	40	24	16	1.5	1	17	17	17	0	5	1	0
Total		20	7	50	34	18	2.5	1	17	17	17	0	7	2	0
