= 2017 Colonial Athletic Association football season =

2017 CAA football season
- League: NCAA Division I Football Championship
- Sport: Football
- Duration: August 27, 2017 – November 18, 2017
- Teams: 12

CAA football seasons
- ← 2016 2018 →

2017 Colonial Athletic Association football standings
	Conf.			Overall
Team	W		L	W		L
No. 2 James Madison $^	8	–	0	14	–	1
No. 11 Stony Brook ^	7	–	1	10	–	3
No. 20 Elon ^	6	–	2	8	–	4
No. 12 New Hampshire ^	5	–	3	9	–	5
Delaware	5	–	3	7	–	4
Richmond	4	–	4	6	–	5
Towson	3	–	5	5	–	6
Villanova	3	–	5	5	–	6
Maine	3	–	5	4	–	6
Albany	2	–	6	4	–	7
Rhode Island	2	–	6	3	–	8
William & Mary	0	–	8	2	–	9
$ – Conference champion; ^ – FCS playoff participant; Rankings from STATS Poll

The 2017 Colonial Athletic Association football season was the 11th season of football for the Colonial Athletic Association (CAA) and part of the 2017 NCAA Division I FCS football season.

== Head coaches ==
Team	Coach	Season	Overall Record	Record at School	CAA Record
Albany	Greg Gattuso	4th	114–49 (.699)	17–17 (.500)	9–15 (.375)
Delaware	Danny Rocco	1st	90–42 (.682)	0–0 (–)	26–14 (.650)
Elon	Curt Cignetti	1st	53–17 (.757)	0–0 (–)	0–0 (–)
James Madison	Mike Houston	2nd	57–20 (.740)	14–1 (.933)	8–0 (1.000)
Maine	Joe Harasymiak	2nd	6–5 (.545)	6–5 (.545)	5–3 (.625)
New Hampshire	Sean McDonnell	19th	141–83 (.629)	141–83 (.629)	90–57 (.612)
Rhode Island	Jim Fleming	4th	25–31 (.446)	4–30 (.118)	3–21 (.125)
Richmond	Russ Huesman	1st	59–37 (.615)	0–0 (–)	0–0 (–)
Stony Brook	Chuck Priore	12th	106–67 (.613)	67–58 (.536)	14–18 (.438)
Towson	Rob Ambrose	9th	50–55 (.476)	47–48 (.495)	32–34 (.485)
Villanova	Mark Ferrante	1st	0–0 (–)	0–0 (–)	0–0 (–)
William & Mary	Jimmye Laycock	38th	243–180–2 (.574)	243–180–2 (.574)	109–85 (.562)

Records are from before start of 2017 season

== Preseason poll results ==
First place votes in parentheses

Place	School
1	James Madison (21)
2	Richmond (3)
3	Villanova
4	New Hampshire
5	Delaware
6	Albany
7	William & Mary
8	Stony Brook
9	Maine
10	Towson
11	Elon
12	Rhode Island

== Rankings ==
Legend
	Increase in ranking
	Decrease in ranking
	Not ranked previous week
RV	Receiving votes

		Pre	Wk 1	Wk 2	Wk 3	Wk 4	Wk 5	Wk 6	Wk 7	Wk 8	Wk 9	Wk 10	Wk 11	Wk 12	Final
Albany	S	24	RV	RV	RV	19	24	RV	RV	RV					
Albany	C	RV	RV		RV	22	RV	RV	RV						
Delaware	S	RV	RV	RV	RV	RV	RV	RV	RV	23	RV	RV	RV	RV	RV
Delaware	C		RV					RV	RV	RV	RV	RV	RV	RV	RV
Elon	S				RV	23	18	16	14	10	7	7	11	15	20
Elon	C					RV	23	20	15	11	10	9	15	17	21
James Madison	S	1	1	1	1	1	1	1	1	1	1	1	1	1	2
James Madison	C	1	1	1	1	1	1	1	1	1	1	1	1	1	2
Maine	S	RV	RV	RV	RV						RV				
Maine	C														
New Hampshire	S	13	12	9	15	15	13	12	18	17	21	18	16	21	12
New Hampshire	C	16	12	11	16	14	13	12	18	16	19	16	14	20	15
Rhode Island	S		RV												
Rhode Island	C														
Richmond	S	7	9	8	8	16	14	13	11	19	RV	RV	RV	RV	RV
Richmond	C	7	9	T-6	6	15	14	13	10	17	RV	RV	RV	RV	
Stony Brook	S	RV	RV	RV	RV	RV	23	RV	22	22	14	12	10	10	11
Stony Brook	C				RV	RV	24	RV	RV	RV	21	15	12	11	11
Towson	S				RV										
Towson	C	RV	RV	RV	RV	RV									
Villanova	S	10	6	7	7	14	12	11	15	13	20	RV			
Villanova	C	9	8	8	8	17	15	14	16	15	20	RV			
William & Mary	S	RV	RV	RV	RV	RV									
William & Mary	C	RV	RV	RV	RV	RV									

== Regular season ==
Index to colors and formatting
CAA member won
CAA member lost
CAA teams in **bold**

All times Eastern time.

Rankings reflect that of the STATS FCS poll for that week.

=== Week One ===
Date	Time	Visiting team	Home team	Site	TV	Result	Attendance	Reference
August 31	7:00 pm	Delaware State	**Delaware**	Delaware Stadium • Newark, DE		**W** 22–3	18,040	
August 31	7:00 pm	**Elon**	Toledo	Glass Bowl • Toledo, OH	ESPN3	**L** 13–47	22,104	
August 31	7:00 pm	**Maine**	**No. 13 New Hampshire**	Wildcat Stadium • Durham, NH		**UNH** 24–23	15,854	
August 31	7:00 pm	**Rhode Island**	Central Michigan	Kelly/Shorts Stadium • Mount Pleasant, MI	ESPN3	**L** 27–30 (3OT)	16,311	
September 1	7:00 pm	**No. 7 Richmond**	No. 3 Sam Houston State	McLane Stadium • Waco, TX	ESPN3	**L** 34–48	8,048	
September 2	12:30 pm	**No. 10 Villanova**	No. 17 Lehigh	Goodman Stadium • Bethlehem, PA		**W** 38–35	5,816	
September 2	3:30 pm	**William & Mary**	Virginia	Scott Stadium • Charlottesville, VA	ESPN3	**L** 10–28	38,828	
September 2	4:00 pm	**Stony Brook**	South Florida	Raymond James Stadium • Tampa, FL	ESPN3	**L** 17–31	26,460	
September 2	6:00 pm	**No. 24 Albany**	Old Dominion	Foreman Field at S. B. Ballard Stadium • Norfolk, VA	ESPN3	**L** 17–31	20,118	
September 2	6:00 pm	**No. 1 James Madison**	East Carolina	Dowdy–Ficklen Stadium • Greenville, NC	ESPN3	**W** 34–14	40,169	
September 2	6:00 pm	Morgan State	**Towson**	Johnny Unitas Stadium • Towson, MD		**W** 10–0	6,563	

Players of the week:

Offensive		Defensive		Freshman		Special teams	
Player	Team	Player	Team	Player	Team	Player	Team
Cardon Johnson	James Madison	Kyre Hawkins	James Madison	Bryce Carter	Towson	Andrew Trent	Stony Brook

=== Week Two ===
Date	Time	Visiting team	Home team	Site	TV	Result	Attendance	Reference
September 9	noon	**Towson**	Maryland	Maryland Stadium • College Park, MD	BTN	**L** 17–63	37,105	
September 9	1:00 pm	**Albany**	Morgan State	Hughes Stadium • Baltimore, MD		**W** 26–0	3,789	
September 9	1:00 pm	**Elon**	Furman	Paladin Stadium • Greenville, SC		**W** 34–31	6,342	
September 9	1:00 pm	**Stony Brook**	**Rhode Island**	Meade Stadium • Kingston, RI		**SBU** 35–18	5,102	
September 9	1:00 pm	**No. 9 Richmond**	Colgate	Andy Kerr Stadium • Hamilton, NY	Stadium	**W** 20–17	6,994	
September 9	3:30 pm	**Delaware**	No. 18 (FBS) Virginia Tech	Lane Stadium • Blacksburg, VA	ACCN Extra	**L** 0–27	62,526	
September 9	3:30 pm	Bryant	**Maine**	Alfond Stadium • Orono, ME	WVII; WFVX; WPME	**W** 60–12	6,313	
September 9	3:30 pm	**No. 6 Villanova**	Temple	Lincoln Financial Field • Philadelphia, PA	ESPN3	**L** 13–16	35,117	
September 9	4:00 pm	**No. 12 New Hampshire**	Georgia Southern	Legion Field • Birmingham, AL		**W** 22–12	3,387	
September 9	6:00 pm	East Tennessee State	**No. 1 James Madison**	Bridgeforth Stadium • Harrisonburg, VA		**W** 52–10	24,722	
September 9	6:00 pm	**William & Mary**	Norfolk State	William "Dick" Price Stadium • Norfolk, VA		**W** 20–6	7,615	

Players of the week:

Offensive		Defensive		Freshman		Special teams	
Player	Team	Player	Team	Player	Team	Player	Team
Josh Mack	Maine	Andrew Clyde; Jae'Wuan Horton	Richmond; New Hampshire	Davis Cheek	Elon	Owen Johnson	Elon

=== Week Three ===
Date	Time	Visiting team	Home team	Site	TV	Result	Attendance	Reference
September 16	1:00 pm	Harvard	**Rhode Island**	Meade Stadium • Kingston, RI		**W** 17–10	3,812	
September 16	1:05 pm	**No. 9 New Hampshire**	Holy Cross	Fitton Field • Worcester, MA		**L** 26–51	7,906	
September 16	2:00 pm	Howard	**No. 8 Richmond**	E. Claiborne Robins Stadium • Richmond, VA	CSN+	**W** 68–21	8,217	
September 16	3:30 pm	Cornell	**Delaware**	Delaware Stadium • Newark, DE		**W** 41–14	14,714	
September 16	3:30 pm	Norfolk State	**No. 1 James Madison**	Bridgeforth Stadium • Harrisonburg, VA		**W** 75–14	23,118	
September 16	6:00 pm	Sacred Heart	**Stony Brook**	Kenneth P. LaValle Stadium • Stony Brook, NY		**W** 45–7	8,102	
September 16	6:00 pm	Lafayette	**No. 7 Villanova**	Villanova Stadium • Villanova, PA		**W** 59–0	9,671	
September 16	6:00 pm	Bucknell	**William & Mary**	Zable Stadium • Williamsburg, VA		**W** 30–9	8,315	
September 16	6:00 pm	No. 16 Charleston Southern	**Elon**	Rhodes Stadium • Elon, NC		**W** 19–17	5,248	
September 16	7:00 pm	Monmouth	**Albany**	Bob Ford Field • Albany, NY		**W** 28–14	6,384	
September 16	7:00 pm	**Towson**	Saint Francis	DeGol Field • Loretto, PA		**W** 16–14	2,412	

Players of the week:

Offensive		Defensive		Freshman		Special teams	
Player	Team	Player	Team	Player	Team	Player	Team
Kyle Lauletta	Richmond	Nate Hatalsky	Albany	Ryan Stover	Towson	Aidan O'Neill	Towson

=== Week Four ===
Date	Time	Visiting team	Home team	Site	Result	Attendance	Reference
September 23	1:30 pm	**Maine**	**No. 1 James Madison**	Bridgeforth Stadium • Harrisonburg, VA	**JMU** 28–10	25,330	
September 23	3:30 pm	**Rhode Island**	**No. 15 New Hampshire**	Wildcat Stadium • Durham, NH	**UNH** 28–14	22,135	
September 23	6:00 pm	**Elon**	**No. 8 Richmond**	E. Claiborne Robins Stadium • Richmond, VA	**ELON** 36–33	8,217	
September 23	6:00 pm	**Towson**	**Stony Brook**	Kenneth P. LaValle Stadium • Stony Brook, NY	**SBU** 25–17	6,672	
September 23	7:00 pm	**No. 7 Villanova**	**Albany**	Bob Ford Field • Albany, NY	**ALB** 19–10 (OT)	6,866	

Players of the week:

Offensive		Defensive		Freshman		Special teams	
Player	Team	Player	Team	Player	Team	Player	Team
Malcolm Summers; Trevor Knight	Elon; New Hampshire	Eli Mencer	Albany	Ezrah Archie	James Madison	Alex Lucansky	Stony Brook

=== Week Five ===
Date	Time	Visiting team	Home team	Site	TV	Result	Attendance	Reference
September 30	12:30 pm	**Rhode Island**	Brown	Brown Stadium • Providence, RI		**L** 21–24	3,191	
September 30	2:00 pm	**No. 19 Albany**	**No. 23 Elon**	Rhodes Stadium • Elon, NC		**ELON** 6–0	5,024	
September 30	3:30 pm	**No. 1 James Madison**	**Delaware**	Delaware Stadium • Newark, DE		**JMU** 20–10	16,372	
September 30	6:00 pm	Bryant	**No. 15 New Hampshire**	Wildcat Stadium • Durham, NH		**W** 45–17	7,951	
September 30	6:00 pm	**Stony Brook**	**William & Mary**	Zable Stadium • Williamsburg, VA		**SBU** 21–18	8,082	
September 30	6:00 pm	**No. 14 Villanova**	**Towson**	Johnny Unitas Stadium • Towson, MD		**NOVA** 24–9	5,017	

Players of the week:

Offensive		Defensive		Freshman		Special teams	
Player	Team	Player	Team	Player	Team	Player	Team
Trai Sharp	James Madison	Tyler Campbell; John Haggart	Elon; Stony Brook	Nate Evans	William & Mary	John Hinchen	Villanova

=== Week Six ===
Date	Time	Visiting team	Home team	Site	Result	Attendance	Reference
October 7	1:00 pm	**Maine**	**No. 12 Villanova**	Villanova Stadium • Villanova, PA	**NOVA** 31–0	4,505	
October 7	2:00 pm	**William & Mary**	**No. 18 Elon**	Rhodes Stadium • Elon, NC	**ELON** 25–17	10,137	
October 7	3:00 pm	**No. 24 Albany**	**No. 14 Richmond**	E. Claiborne Robins Stadium • Richmond, VA	**RICH** 41–38 (2OT)	8,217	
October 7	6:00 pm	**Delaware**	**No. 23 Stony Brook**	Kenneth P. LaValle Stadium • Stony Brook, NY	**DEL** 24–20	7,694	

Players of the week:

Offensive		Defensive		Freshman		Special teams	
Player	Team	Player	Team	Player	Team	Player	Team
Kyle Lauletta	Richmond	Troy Reeder	Delaware	Jaquan Amos	Villanova	Frank Raggo	Delaware

=== Week Seven ===
Date	Time	Visiting team	Home team	Site	TV	Result	Attendance	Reference
October 14	3:30 pm	**William & Mary**	**Delaware**	Delaware Stadium • Newark, DE		**DEL** 17–0	18,721	
October 14	3:30 pm	**No. 11 Villanova**	**No. 1 James Madison**	Bridgeforth Stadium • Harrisonburg, VA		**JMU** 30–8	25,933	
October 14	3:30 pm	**Rhode Island**	**Maine**	Alfond Stadium • Orono, ME	WVII; WFVX; WPME	**MAINE** 51–27	9,205	
October 14	4:00 pm	**No. 13 Richmond**	**Towson**	Johnny Unitas Stadium • Towson, MD		**RICH** 23–3	5,768	
October 14	6:00 pm	**No. 12 New Hampshire**	**Stony Brook**	Kenneth P. LaValle Stadium • Stony Brook, NY		**SBU** 38–24	12,311	

Players of the week:

Offensive		Defensive		Freshman		Special teams	
Player	Team	Player	Team	Player	Team	Player	Team
Josh Mack	Maine	Kyre Hawkins	James Madison	Chris Ferguson	Maine	Donald Liotine	Stony Brook

=== Week Eight ===
Date	Time	Visiting team	Home team	Site	Result	Attendance	Reference
October 21	noon	**No. 14 Elon**	**Rhode Island**	Meade Stadium • Kingston, RI	**ELON** 35–34	7,221	
October 21	2:00 pm	**Towson**	**No. 18 New Hampshire**	Wildcat Stadium • Durham, NH	**UNH** 40–17	10,522	
October 21	3:30 pm	**Maine**	**Albany**	Bob Ford Field • Albany, NY	**MAINE** 12–10	8,919	
October 21	3:30 pm	**No. 11 Richmond**	**Delaware**	Delaware Stadium • Newark, DE	**DEL** 42–35 (2OT)	15,710	
October 21	3:30 pm	**No. 1 James Madison**	**William & Mary**	Zable Stadium • Williamsburg, VA	**JMU** 46–14	13,125	

Players of the week:

Offensive		Defensive		Freshman		Special teams	
Player	Team	Player	Team	Player	Team	Player	Team
Jamie Jarmon	Delaware	Nasir Adderley	Delaware	DeUnte Chatman; Davis Cheek	New Hampshire; Elon	Matt Pires	Rhode Island

=== Week Nine ===
Date	Time	Visiting team	Home team	Site	TV	Result	Attendance	Reference
October 28	noon	William & Mary	Maine	Alfond Stadium • Orono, ME	WVII; WFVX; WPME	**MAINE** 23–6	6,579	
October 28	1:00 pm	Rhode Island	Albany	Bob Ford Field • Albany, NY		**URI** 31–14	3,383	
October 28	3:00 pm	No. 22 Stony Brook	No. 19 Richmond	E. Claiborne Robins Stadium • Richmond, VA		**SBU** 27–24	8.217	
October 28	3:30 pm	No. 10 Elon	No. 13 Villanova	Villanova Stadium • Villanova, PA		**ELON** 19–14	5,451	
October 28	3:30 pm	No. 17 New Hampshire	No. 1 James Madison	Bridgeforth Stadium • Harrisonburg, VA		**JMU** 21–0	25,298	
October 28	4:00 pm	No. 23 Delaware	Towson	Johnny Unitas Stadium • Towson, MD		**TOWS** 18–17	6,402	

Players of the week:

Offensive		Defensive		Freshman		Special teams	
Player	Team	Player	Team	Player	Team	Player	Team
Davis Cheek	Elon	Brandon Ginnetti; Rashad Robinson	Rhode Island; James Madison	Kortez Weeks; Ryan Stover	Elon; Towson	Brandon Briggs	Maine

=== Week Ten ===
Date	Time	Visiting team	Home team	Site	Result	Attendance	Reference
November 4	noon	No. 1 James Madison	Rhode Island	Meade Stadium • Kingston, RI	**JMU** 38–3	3,227	
November 4	1:00 pm	Albany	No. 14 Stony Brook	Kenneth P. LaValle Stadium • Stony Brook, NY	**SBU** 28–21 (OT)	7,106	
November 4	1:00 pm	Richmond	No. 20 Villanova	Villanova Stadium • Villanova, PA	**RICH** 22–0	3,508	
November 4	2:00 pm	Delaware	Maine	Fitzpatrick Stadium • Portland, ME	**DEL** 31–17	7,212	
November 4	2:00 pm	Towson	No. 7 Elon	Rhodes Stadium • Elon, NC	**ELON** 33–30 (2OT)	10,113	
November 4	2:00 pm	No. 21 New Hampshire	William & Mary	Zable Stadium • Williamsburg, VA	**UNH** 35–16	5,426	

Players of the week:

Offensive		Defensive		Freshman		Special teams	
Player	Team	Player	Team	Player	Team	Player	Team
Trevor Knight	New Hampshire	Troy Reeder	Delaware	Brelynd Cyphers	Elon	Owen Johnson	Elon

=== Week Eleven ===
Date	Time	Visiting team	Home team	Site	TV	Result	Attendance	Reference
November 11	noon	**Villanova**	**Rhode Island**	Meade Stadium • Kingston, RI		**URI** 20–6	2,877	
November 11	1:00 pm	Wagner	**No. 12 Stony Brook**	Kenneth P. LaValle Stadium • Stony Brook, NY		**W** 38–10	5,471	
November 11	2:00 pm	**No. 7 Elon**	**No. 18 New Hampshire**	Wildcat Stadium • Durham, NH		**UNH** 16–6	7,294	
November 11	2:00 pm	**Towson**	**William & Mary**	Zable Stadium • Williamsburg, VA		**TOW** 26–14	6,234	
November 11	3:30 pm	**Albany**	**Delaware**	Delaware Stadium • Newark, DE		**DEL** 22–3	16,333	
November 11	3:30 pm	**Richmond**	**No. 1 James Madison**	Bridgeforth Stadium • Harrisonburg, VA		**JMU** 20–13	24,586	
November 11	4:00 pm	**Maine**	Massachusetts	Fenway Park • Boston, MA	NESNPlus	**L** 31–44	12,794	

Players of the week:

Offensive		Defensive		Freshman		Special teams	
Player	Team	Player	Team	Player	Team	Player	Team
JaJuan Lawson	Rhode Island	Jared Kuehl	New Hampshire	Coby Tippett	Towson	Earnest Edwards	Maine

=== Week Twelve ===
Date	Time	Visiting team	Home team	Site	Result	Attendance	Reference
November 18	noon	No. 1 James Madison	No. 11 Elon	Rhodes Stadium • Elon, NC	**JMU** 31–3	8,662	
November 18	noon	No. 10 Stony Brook	Maine	Alfond Stadium • Orono, ME	**SBU** 20–19	4,983	
November 18	1:00 pm	No. 16 New Hampshire	Albany	Bob Ford Field • Albany, NY	**ALB** 15–0	3,459	
November 18	1:00 pm	Delaware	Villanova	Villanova Stadium • Villanova, PA	**NOVA** 28–7	5,109	
November 18	2:00 pm	Rhode Island	Towson	Johnny Unitas Stadium • Towson, MD	**TOW** 29–10	3,134	
November 18	3:00 pm	William & Mary	Richmond	E. Claiborne Robins Stadium • Richmond, VA	**RICH** 27–20	8,057	

Players of the week:

Offensive		Defensive		Freshman		Special teams	
Player	Team	Player	Team	Player	Team	Player	Team
Bryan Schor	James Madison	Jeff Steeb	Villanova	Ryan Stover	Towson	D'Angelo Amos	James Madison

== FCS Playoffs ==
Date	Time	Visiting team	Home team	Round	Site	TV	Result	Attendance	Reference
November 25	1:00 pm	No. 22 Furman	No. 15 Elon	First Round	Rhodes Stadium • Elon, NC	ESPN3	L 27–28	2,934	
November 25	2:00 pm	Central Connecticut	No. 21 New Hampshire	First Round	Wildcat Stadium • Durham, NH	ESPN3	W 14–0	2,385	
November 25	2:00 pm	Lehigh	No. 10 Stony Brook	First Round	Kenneth P. LaValle Stadium • Stony Brook, NY	ESPN3	W 59–29	4,131	
December 2	2:00 pm	No. 10 Stony Brook	No. 1 James Madison	Second Round	Bridgeforth Stadium • Harrisonburg, VA	ESPN3	JMU 26–7	16,449	
December 2	3:00 pm	No. 21 New Hampshire	No. 3 Central Arkansas	Second Round	Estes Stadium • Conway, AR	ESPN3	W 21–15	6,243	
December 8	7:00 pm	No. 11 Weber State	No. 1 James Madison	Quarterfinals	Bridgeforth Stadium • Harrisonburg, VA	ESPN2	W 31–28	13,490	
December 9	3:00 pm	No. 21 New Hampshire	No. 6 South Dakota State	Quarterfinals	Dana J. Dykhouse Stadium • Brookings, SD	ESPN3	L 14–56	5,583	
December 16	4:30 pm	No. 6 South Dakota State	No. 1 James Madison	Semifinals	Bridgeforth Stadium • Harrisonburg, VA	ESPNU	W 51–16	16,528	
January 6	noon	No. 2 North Dakota State	No. 1 James Madison	Championship	Toyota Stadium • Frisco, TX	ESPN2	L 13–17	19,090	

== Postseason Awards ==
- Coach of the Year – Curt Cignetti (Elon)
- Offensive Player of the Year – Kyle Lauletta, SR, QB (Richmond)
- Defensive Player of the Year – Andrew Ankrah, SR, DL (James Madison)
- Special Teams Player of the Year – John Miller, SR, PR (James Madison)
- Offensive Rookie of the Year – Davis Cheek, FR, QB (Elon)
- Defensive Rookie of the Year – Colby Reeder, FR, LB (Delaware)
- Chuck Boone Leadership Award – Bryan Schor, SR, QB (James Madison)

=== All–Conference Teams ===
Position	First Team		Second Team		Third Team	
Position	Player	Team	Player	Team	Player	Team
QB	Kyle Lauletta, SR	Richmond	Bryan Schor, SR	James Madison	Trevor Knight, JR	New Hampshire
RB	Stacey Bedell, SR; Josh Mack, SO	Stony Brook; Maine	Harold Cooper, SR; Malcolm Summers, JR	Rhode Island; Elon	Kani Kane, JR; Trai Sharp, JR	Delaware; James Madison
FB	Cal Daniels, JR	Stony Brook	Anthony Manzo-Lewis, SR	Albany	Tyler Crist, FR	William & Mary
WR	Ray Bolden, SR; Dejon Brissett, JR; Neil O'Connor, JR	Stony Brook; Richmond; New Hampshire	Aaron Parker, SO; Cortrelle Simpson, SO; Tyler Wilkins, JR	Rhode Island; Richmond; Richmond	Terrence Alls, SR; Marven Beauvais, JR; Kortez Weeks, FR	James Madison; Rhode Island; Elon
TE	Garrett Hudson, SR	Richmond	Charles Scarff, JR	Delaware	Andrew Caskin, SR	William & Mary
OL	Jamil Demby, SR; Connor Hilland, SR; Brody Kern, SR; Alex Light, SR; Timon Parris, SR; Aaron Stinnie, SR	Maine; William & Mary; Delaware; Richmond; Stony Brook; James Madison	Ethan Greenidge, JR; Jade Jackson, SO; Jake Kennedy, SR; CJ Toogood, JR; Jake Trump, SR	Villanova; James Madison; New Hampshire; Elon; Delaware	Dino Boyd, JR; Isaiah Brooks, SR; Chris Durant, SR; Ikenna Nwokeji, SR; John Yarbrough, JR	Rhode Island; Maine; William & Mary; Elon; Richmond
PK	Griffin Trau, JR	Richmond	Frank Raggo, JR	Delaware	Aidan O'Neill, SO	Towson
KR	Earnest Edwards, SO	Maine	Rodney Dorsey, FR	Towson	Harold Cooper, SR	Rhode Island
PR	John Miller, SR	James Madison	Donovan McDonald, SO	Albany	Matt Pires, FR	Rhode Island
DL	Andrew Ankrah, SR; Andrew Clyde, JR; Malachi Hoskins, SR; Bilal Nichols, SR; Simeyon Robinson, SR	James Madison; Richmond; Albany; Delaware; James Madison	Kanyia Anderson, SR; Ousmane Camara, SR; Rick Holt, SR; Blaine Woodson, SR	Towson; Stony Brook; New Hampshire; Delaware	Darrious Carter, JR; Brandon Ginnetti, SO; Isaiah Stephens, SR; Brandon Waller, SR; Kayon Whitaker, SO	James Madison; Rhode Island; William & Mary; Richmond; Maine
LB	Kyre Hawkins, SR; Warren Messer, JR; Troy Reeder, JR; Ed Shockley, SR	James Madison; Elon; Delaware; Villanova	Quinlen Dean, SO; Nate Hatalsky, SR; Shayne Lawless, JR; Sterling Sheffield, JR	New Hampshire; Albany; Stony Brook; Maine	Nate Atkins, SO; Tyrice Beverette, JR; Brandon Hereford, SR; Justin Rubin, JR	William & Mary; Stony Brook; James Madison; Richmond
CB	Jimmy Moreland, JR; Rashad Robinson, JR	James Madison; James Madison	Manny Patterson, SO; Malik Reaves, SR	Maine; Villanova	Travon Reid-Segure, SR; Prince Smith, Jr., SO	Stony Brook; New Hampshire
S	Nasir Adderley, JR; Raven Greene, SR	Delaware; James Madison	Jordan Brown, SR; Chris Cooper, SR	James Madison; Stony Brook	Chris Blair, SR; Corey Parker, SO; Darin Peart, SR	Elon; William & Mary; Stony Brook
P	John Hinchen, SR	Villanova	Harry O’Kelly, FR	James Madison	Nick Pritchard, SO	Delaware
SPEC	Mozai Nelson, JR	Maine	Isaiah White, JR	Stony Brook	Eli Mencer, SO	Albany

== Records against other conferences ==
Conference	Record
ACC	0–2
American	1–2
Big 10	0–1
Big Sky	1–0
Big South	2–0
C–USA	0–1
Independent	0–1
Ivy League	2–1
MAC	0–2
MEAC	6–0
MVFC	1–2
NEC	6–0
Patriot	5–1
Southern	2–1
Southland	1–1
Sun Belt	1–0
FBS Total	2–9
FCS Total	26–6
Total	28–15

== Attendance ==
Team	Stadium	Capacity	Game 1	Game 2	Game 3	Game 4	Game 5	Game 6	Total	Average	% of Capacity
Albany	Bob Ford Field	8,500	6,384	6,866	8,919	3,383	3,459		30,011	6,002	71%
Delaware	Delaware Stadium	22,000	18,040	14,714	16,372	18,721	15,710	16,333	99,890	16,648	76%
Elon	Rhodes Stadium	11,250	5,248	5,024	10,137	10,113	8,662		39,184	7,837	70%
James Madison	Bridgeforth Stadium	24,877	24,722	23,118	25,330	25,993	25,298	24,586	149,047	24,841	100%
Maine	Alfond Stadium	10,000	6,313	9,205	6,579	7,212	4,983		34,292	6,858	69%
New Hampshire	Wildcat Stadium	11,015	15,854	22,135	7,951	10,522	7,294		63,756	12,751	116%
Rhode Island	Meade Stadium	6,555	5,102	3,812	7,221	3,227	2,877		22,240	4,448	68%
Richmond	E. Claiborne Robins Stadium	8,217	8,217	8,217	8,217	8,217	8,057		40,925	8,185	100%
Stony Brook	Kenneth P. LaValle Stadium	12,300	8,102	6,672	7,694	12,311	7,106	5,471	47,356	7,893	64%
Towson	Johnny Unitas Stadium	11,198	6,563	5,017	5,768	6,402	3,134		26,884	5,377	48%
Villanova	Villanova Stadium	12,500	9,671	4,505	5,451	3,508	5,109		28,244	5,649	45%
William & Mary	Zable Stadium	12,672	8,315	8,082	13,125	5,426	6,234		41,128	8,236	65%

== NFL draft ==
The following list includes all CAA players who were drafted in the 2018 NFL draft.

Round #	Pick #	NFL team	Player	Position	College
4	108	New York Giants	Kyle Lauletta	QB	Richmond
5	145	Chicago Bears	Bilal Nichols	DT	Delaware
6	192	Los Angeles Rams	Jamil Demby	T	Maine
