= 2017 New Hampshire Wildcats football team =

American college football season

2017 New Hampshire Wildcats football

FCS Playoffs Quarterfinals, L 14–56 vs. South Dakota State
- Conference: Colonial Athletic Association

Ranking
- STATS: No. 12
- FCS Coaches: No. 20
- Record: 9–5 (5–3 CAA)
- Head coach: Sean McDonnell (19th season)
- Offensive coordinator: Ryan Carty (10th season)
- Defensive coordinator: John Lyons (6th season)
- Home stadium: Wildcat Stadium

2017 Colonial Athletic Association football standings
	Conf.			Overall
Team	W		L	W		L
No. 2 James Madison $^	8	–	0	14	–	1
No. 11 Stony Brook ^	7	–	1	10	–	3
No. 20 Elon ^	6	–	2	8	–	4
No. 12 New Hampshire ^	5	–	3	9	–	5
Delaware	5	–	3	7	–	4
Richmond	4	–	4	6	–	5
Towson	3	–	5	5	–	6
Villanova	3	–	5	5	–	6
Maine	3	–	5	4	–	6
Albany	2	–	6	4	–	7
Rhode Island	2	–	6	3	–	8
William & Mary	0	–	8	2	–	9
$ – Conference champion; ^ – FCS playoff participant; Rankings from STATS Poll

The 2017 New Hampshire Wildcats football team represented the University of New Hampshire in the 2017 NCAA Division I FCS football season. They were led by 19th-year head coach Sean McDonnell and played their home games at Wildcat Stadium. They were a member of the Colonial Athletic Association. They finished the season 9–5, 5–3 in CAA play to finish in a tie for fourth place. They received an at-large bid to the FCS Playoffs where they defeated Central Connecticut and Central Arkansas before losing in the quarterfinals to South Dakota State.

== Schedule ==
Date	Time	Opponent	Rank	Site	TV	Result	Attendance
August 31	7:00 p.m.	Maine	No. 13	Wildcat Stadium; Durham, NH (Battle for the Brice–Cowell Musket)	CSL	W 24–23	15,854
September 9	4:00 p.m.	at Georgia Southern*	No. 12	Legion Field; Birmingham, AL	ESPN3	W 22–12	3,387
September 16	1:00 p.m.	at Holy Cross*	No. 9	Fitton Field; Worcester, MA	Charter TV3	L 26–51	7,906
September 23	3:30 p.m.	Rhode Island^{†}	No. 15	Wildcat Stadium; Durham, NH	ESPN3	W 28–14	22,135
September 30	6:00 p.m.	Bryant*	No. 15	Wildcat Stadium; Durham, NH	ESPN3	W 45–17	7,951
October 14	6:00 p.m.	at Stony Brook	No. 12	Kenneth P. LaValle Stadium; Stony Brook, NY	Wolfievision	L 24–38	12,311
October 21	2:00 p.m.	Towson	No. 18	Wildcat Stadium; Durham, NH	UNHAthletics via YouTube	W 40–17	10,522
October 28	3:30 p.m.	at No. 1 James Madison	No. 17	Bridgeforth Stadium; Harrisonburg, VA	MadiZone	L 0–21	25,298
November 4	2:00 p.m.	at William & Mary	No. 21	Zable Stadium; Williamsburg, VA	TATV	W 35–16	5,426
November 11	2:00 p.m.	No. 7 Elon	No. 18	Wildcat Stadium; Durham, NH	FCS; FSGO	W 16–6	7,294
November 18	1:00 p.m.	at Albany	No. 16	Bob Ford Field at Tom & Mary Casey Stadium; Albany, NY	CSL	L 0–15	3,459
November 25	2:00 p.m.	Central Connecticut*	No. 21	Wildcat Stadium; Durham, NH (NCAA Division I First Round)	ESPN3	W 14–0	2,385
December 2	2:00 p.m.	at No. 3 Central Arkansas*	No. 21	Estes Stadium; Conway, AR (NCAA Division I Second Round)	ESPN3	W 21–15	6,243
December 9	3:00 p.m.	at No. 6 South Dakota State*	No. 21	Dana J. Dykhouse Stadium; Brookings, SD (NCAA Division I Quarterfinal)	ESPN3	L 14–56	5,583
*Non-conference game; ^{†}Homecoming; Rankings from STATS Poll released prior to the game; All times are in Eastern time

== Game summaries ==
=== Maine ===
	1	2	3	4	Total
Black Bears	7	3	7	6	23
No. 13 Wildcats	14	3	0	7	24

=== At Georgia Southern ===
	1	2	3	4	Total
No. 12 Wildcats	15	7	0	0	22
Eagles	0	0	5	7	12

=== At Holy Cross ===
	1	2	3	4	Total
No. 9 Wildcats	7	0	12	7	26
Crusaders	3	13	21	14	51

=== Rhode Island ===
	1	2	3	4	Total
Rams	0	0	7	7	14
No. 15 Wildcats	8	7	0	13	28

=== Bryant ===
	1	2	3	4	Total
Bulldogs	0	17	0	0	17
No. 15 Wildcats	17	14	0	14	45

=== At Stony Brook ===
	1	2	3	4	Total
No. 12 Wildcats	6	18	0	0	24
Seawolves	9	7	6	16	38

=== Towson ===
	1	2	3	4	Total
Tigers	3	0	0	14	17
No. 18 Wildcats	7	26	7	0	40

=== At James Madison ===
	1	2	3	4	Total
No. 17 Wildcats	0	0	0	0	0
No. 1 Dukes	0	14	7	0	21

=== At William & Mary ===
	1	2	3	4	Total
No. 21 Wildcats	7	14	7	7	35
Tribe	0	10	0	6	16

=== Elon ===
	1	2	3	4	Total
No. 7 Phoenix	0	0	0	6	6
No. 18 Wildcats	0	7	9	0	16

=== At Albany ===
	1	2	3	4	Total
No. 16 Wildcats	0	0	0	0	0
Great Danes	0	3	9	3	15

=== NCAA First Round—Central Connecticut ===
	1	2	3	4	Total
Blue Devils	0	0	0	0	0
No. 21 Wildcats	0	7	0	7	14

=== NCAA Second Round—at Central Arkansas ===
	1	2	3	4	Total
No. 21 Wildcats	7	0	7	7	21
No. 3 Bears	7	0	0	8	15

=== NCAA Quarterfinal–at South Dakota State ===
	1	2	3	4	Total
No. 21 Wildcats	0	0	7	7	14
No. 6 Jackrabbits	21	7	14	14	56

== Ranking movements ==
Ranking movements Legend: ██ Increase in ranking ██ Decrease in ranking
	Week													
Poll	Pre	1	2	3	4	5	6	7	8	9	10	11	12	Final
STATS FCS	13	12	9	15	15	13	12	18	17	21	18	16	21	
Coaches	16	12	11	16	14	13	12	18	16	19	16	14	20	
