= 2017 Rhode Island Rams football team =

American college football season

2017 Rhode Island Rams football
- Conference: Colonial Athletic Association
- Record: 3–8 (2–6 CAA)
- Head coach: Jim Fleming (4th season)
- Offensive coordinator: Will Fleming (1st season)
- Defensive coordinator: Pete Rekstis (4th season)
- Home stadium: Meade Stadium

2017 Colonial Athletic Association football standings
	Conf.			Overall
Team	W		L	W		L
No. 2 James Madison $^	8	–	0	14	–	1
No. 11 Stony Brook ^	7	–	1	10	–	3
No. 20 Elon ^	6	–	2	8	–	4
No. 12 New Hampshire ^	5	–	3	9	–	5
Delaware	5	–	3	7	–	4
Richmond	4	–	4	6	–	5
Towson	3	–	5	5	–	6
Villanova	3	–	5	5	–	6
Maine	3	–	5	4	–	6
Albany	2	–	6	4	–	7
Rhode Island	2	–	6	3	–	8
William & Mary	0	–	8	2	–	9
$ – Conference champion; ^ – FCS playoff participant; Rankings from STATS Poll

The 2017 Rhode Island Rams football team represented the University of Rhode Island in the 2017 NCAA Division I FCS football season. They were led by fourth-year head coach Jim Fleming and played their home games at Meade Stadium. They were a member of the Colonial Athletic Association. They finished the season 3–8, 2–6 in CAA play to finish in a tie for tenth place.

== Schedule ==
Date	Time	Opponent	Site	TV	Result	Attendance
August 31	7:00 p.m.	at Central Michigan*	Kelly/Shorts Stadium; Mount Pleasant, MI	ESPN3	L 27–30 ^{3OT}	16,311
September 9	1:00 p.m.	Stony Brook	Meade Stadium; Kingston, RI	CSL	L 18–35	5,102
September 16	1:00 p.m.	Harvard*	Meade Stadium; Kingston, RI	CSL	W 17–10	3,812
September 23	3:30 p.m.	at No. 15 New Hampshire	Wildcat Stadium; Durham, NH	ESPN3	L 14–28	22,135
September 30	12:30 p.m.	at Brown*	Brown Stadium; Providence, RI (Governor's Cup)	ILN	L 21–24	3,191
October 14	3:30 p.m.	at Maine	Alfond Stadium; Orono, ME	FCS	L 27–51	9,205
October 21	Noon	No. 14 Elon^{†}	Meade Stadium; Kingston, RI	CSL	L 34–35	7,221
October 28	1:00 p.m.	at Albany	Bob Ford Field at Tom & Mary Casey Stadium; Albany, NY	ESPN3	W 31–14	3,383
November 4	Noon	No. 1 James Madison	Meade Stadium; Kingston, RI	CSL	L 3–38	3,227
November 11	Noon	Villanova	Meade Stadium; Kingston, RI	CSL	W 20–6	2,877
November 18	2:00 p.m.	at Towson	Johnny Unitas Stadium; Towson, MD	TSN	L 10–29	3,134
*Non-conference game; ^{†}Homecoming; Rankings from STATS FCS Poll released prior to game Poll released prior to the game; All times are in Eastern time

== Game summaries ==
=== At Central Michigan ===
	1	2	3	4	OT	2OT	3OT	Total
Rams	0	0	7	14	3	0	3	27
Chippewas	0	13	0	8	3	0	6	30

=== Stony Brook ===
	1	2	3	4	Total
Seawolves	14	0	7	14	35
Rams	0	0	10	8	18

=== Harvard ===
	1	2	3	4	Total
Crimson	3	7	0	0	10
Rams	0	17	0	0	17

=== At New Hampshire ===
	1	2	3	4	Total
Rams	0	0	7	7	14
No. 15 Wildcats	8	7	0	13	28

=== At Brown ===
	1	2	3	4	Total
Rams	7	7	0	7	21
Bears	3	0	21	0	24

=== At Maine ===
	1	2	3	4	Total
Rams	14	7	0	6	27
Black Bears	7	16	28	0	51

=== Elon ===
	1	2	3	4	Total
No. 14 Phoenix	14	7	7	7	35
Rams	7	20	7	0	34

=== At Albany ===
	1	2	3	4	Total
Rams	6	15	3	7	31
Great Danes	0	0	7	7	14

=== James Madison ===
	1	2	3	4	Total
No. 1 Dukes	0	7	17	14	38
Rams	0	3	0	0	3

=== Villanova ===
	1	2	3	4	Total
Wildcats	3	0	3	0	6
Rams	3	7	10	0	20

=== At Towson ===
	1	2	3	4	Total
Rams	7	3	0	0	10
Tigers	2	13	7	7	29
