= 2017 William & Mary Tribe football team =

American college football season

2017 William & Mary Tribe football
- Conference: Colonial Athletic Association
- Record: 2–9 (0–8 CAA)
- Head coach: Jimmye Laycock (38th season)
- Offensive coordinator: D. J. Mangas (1st season)
- Defensive coordinator: Trevor Andrews (4th season)
- Captains: Matt Ahola; Andrew Caskin; Connor Hilland; Aaron Swinton
- Home stadium: Zable Stadium

2017 Colonial Athletic Association football standings
	Conf.			Overall
Team	W		L	W		L
No. 2 James Madison $^	8	–	0	14	–	1
No. 11 Stony Brook ^	7	–	1	10	–	3
No. 20 Elon ^	6	–	2	8	–	4
No. 12 New Hampshire ^	5	–	3	9	–	5
Delaware	5	–	3	7	–	4
Richmond	4	–	4	6	–	5
Towson	3	–	5	5	–	6
Villanova	3	–	5	5	–	6
Maine	3	–	5	4	–	6
Albany	2	–	6	4	–	7
Rhode Island	2	–	6	3	–	8
William & Mary	0	–	8	2	–	9
$ – Conference champion; ^ – FCS playoff participant; Rankings from STATS Poll

The 2017 William & Mary Tribe football team represented the College of William & Mary as a member of the Colonial Athletic Association (CAA) in the 2017 NCAA Division I FCS football season. The Tribe were led by 38th-year head coach Jimmye Laycock played their home games at Zable Stadium. They finished the season 2–9 overall and 0–8 in CAA play to place last of out of 12 teams. It was the first time since the 1956 season in which William & Mary failed to win a single conference game.

== Schedule ==
Date	Time	Opponent	Site	TV	Result	Attendance
September 2	3:30 p.m.	at Virginia*	Scott Stadium; Charlottesville, VA	ACCN Extra	L 10–28	38,828
September 9	6:00 p.m.	at Norfolk State*	William "Dick" Price Stadium; Norfolk, VA	SSC	W 20–6	7,615
September 16	6:00 p.m.	Bucknell*	Zable Stadium; Williamsburg, VA	TATV	W 30–9	8,315
September 30	6:00 p.m.	Stony Brook	Zable Stadium; Williamsburg, VA	TATV	L 18–21	8,082
October 7	2:00 p.m.	at No. 18 Elon	Rhodes Stadium; Elon, NC	PAA	L 17–25	10,137
October 14	3:30 p.m.	at Delaware	Delaware Stadium; Newark, DE (rivalry)	NBCS PH	L 0–17	18,721
October 21	3:30 p.m.	No. 1 James Madison^{†}	Zable Stadium; Williamsburg, VA (rivalry)	Cox Yurview	L 14–46	13,125
October 28	Noon	at Maine	Alfond Stadium; Orono, ME	FCS	L 6–23	6,579
November 4	2:00 p.m.	No. 21 New Hampshire	Zable Stadium; Williamsburg, VA	TATV	L 16–35	5,426
November 11	2:00 p.m.	Towson	Zable Stadium; Williamsburg, VA	CSL	L 14–26	6,234
November 18	3:00 p.m.	at Richmond	E. Claiborne Robins Stadium; Richmond, VA (Capital Cup)	NBCS WA	L 20–27	8,057
*Non-conference game; ^{†}Homecoming; Rankings from STATS Poll released prior to the game; All times are in Eastern time

== Game summaries ==
=== At Virginia ===
	1	2	3	4	Total
Tribe	0	0	3	7	10
Cavaliers	7	7	7	7	28

=== At Norfolk State ===
	1	2	3	4	Total
Tribe	0	13	7	0	20
Spartans	0	3	3	0	6

=== Bucknell ===
	1	2	3	4	Total
Bison	0	9	0	0	9
Tribe	7	3	20	0	30

=== Stony Brook ===
	1	2	3	4	Total
Seawolves	7	7	7	0	21
Tribe	0	0	3	15	18

=== At Elon ===
	1	2	3	4	Total
Tribe	0	3	14	0	17
No. 18 Phoenix	6	17	0	2	25

=== At Delaware ===
	1	2	3	4	Total
Tribe	0	0	0	0	0
Fightin' Blue Hens	0	10	0	7	17

=== James Madison ===
	1	2	3	4	Total
No. 1 Dukes	7	12	10	17	46
Tribe	0	0	0	14	14

=== At Maine ===
	1	2	3	4	Total
Tribe	3	0	3	0	6
Black Bears	3	10	0	10	23

=== New Hampshire ===
	1	2	3	4	Total
No. 21 Wildcats	7	14	7	7	35
Tribe	0	10	0	6	16

=== Towson ===
	1	2	3	4	Total
Tigers	12	0	0	14	26
Tribe	7	7	0	0	14

=== At Richmond ===
	1	2	3	4	Total
Tribe	0	3	14	3	20
Spiders	0	7	13	7	27
