= Kyle Lauletta =

American football player (born 1995)

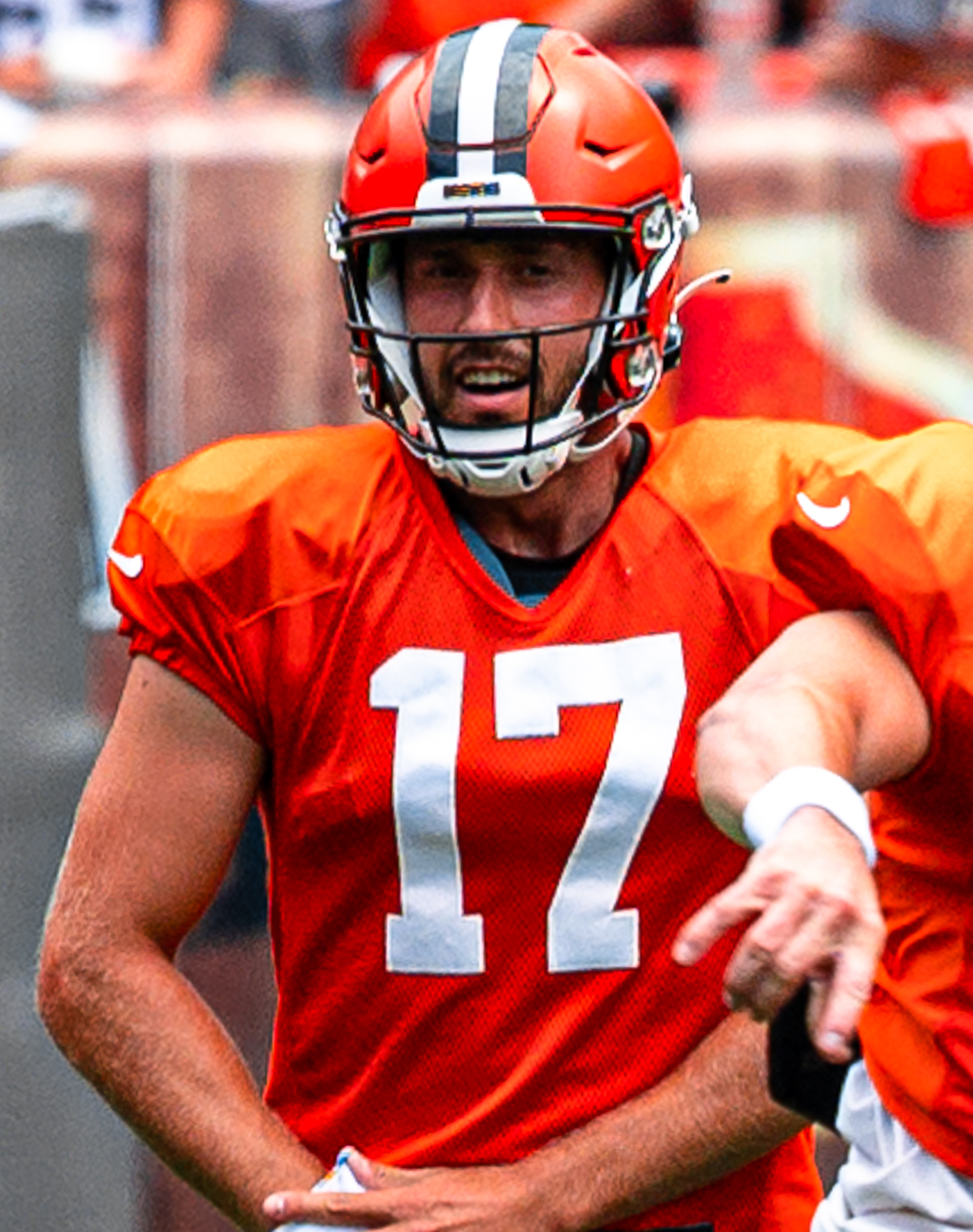
- Lauletta with the Cleveland Browns in 2021

Jacksonville Sharks
- Position: Quarterback

Personal information
- Born: March 17, 1995 (age 31); Exton, Pennsylvania, U.S.
- Listed height: 6 ft 3 in (1.91 m)
- Listed weight: 222 lb (101 kg)

Career information
- High school: Downingtown East (Lionville, Pennsylvania)
- College: Richmond (2013–2017)
- NFL draft: 2018: 4th round, 108th overall pick

Career history
- New York Giants (2018); Philadelphia Eagles (2019–2020)*; Atlanta Falcons (2020)*; Cleveland Browns (2020–2021)*; Jacksonville Jaguars (2021)*; Cleveland Browns (2021); Pittsburgh Maulers (2022); New Jersey Generals (2022–2023); Jacksonville Sharks (2026–present)
- * Offseason or practice squad member only

Career NFL statistics
- Passing completions: 0
- Passing attempts: 5
- TD–INT: 0–1
- Stats at Pro Football Reference

Kyle James Lauletta (born March 17, 1995) is an American professional football quarterback for the Jacksonville Sharks of the Indoor Football League (IFL). He played college football for the Richmond Spiders and was selected by the New York Giants in the fourth round of the 2018 NFL draft. He was also a member of the NFL's Philadelphia Eagles, Atlanta Falcons, Cleveland Browns and Jacksonville Jaguars. He also played in the United States Football League (USFL) for the Pittsburgh Maulers and New Jersey Generals.

== Early life ==
Lauletta attended the East campus of Downingtown High School in Downingtown, Pennsylvania, and was the starting quarterback for the Cougars football team for his last two years. He came from a family of football players; his father Joe and uncle Lex played quarterback and punter for Navy, respectively, and two of his brothers have also been quarterbacks for Downingtown East. In his first start, he threw for 400 yards and ran for two touchdowns against the defending state champions. He also played lacrosse. Despite his accolades in high school, an off-season injury and bad luck largely prevented any premium Football Bowl Subdivision schools from recruiting Lauletta, and he eventually chose to attend Richmond.

== College career ==
Lauletta played at Richmond from 2013 to 2017. He tore his ACL in 2016 on a quarterback scramble after leading Richmond to an 8–2 record at the time, but recovered and played all games in 2017, his best statistical season. During his collegiate career, he threw for a school-record 10,465 yards and 73 touchdowns. Lauletta was invited to play in the 2018 Senior Bowl, in which he threw for 198 yards and three touchdowns and was named the game's MVP.

== Professional career ==
Pre-draft measurables
Height	Weight	Arm length	Hand span	40-yard dash	10-yard split	20-yard split	20-yard shuttle	Three-cone drill	Vertical jump	Broad jump	Wonderlic
6 ft 2 5/8 in (1.90 m)	222 lb (101 kg)	30 5/8 in (0.78 m)	9 3/4 in (0.25 m)	4.81 s	1.67 s	2.78 s	4.07 s	6.95 s	31 in (0.79 m)	9 ft 5 in (2.87 m)	29
All values from NFL Combine

=== New York Giants ===
Lauletta was selected by the New York Giants in the fourth round (108th overall) of the 2018 NFL draft. The pick used to acquire him was traded from the Tampa Bay Buccaneers in exchange for Jason Pierre-Paul.

On October 30, 2018, Lauletta was arrested in Weehawken, New Jersey, after being pulled over in his Jaguar on the way to Giants team practice. He was charged with eluding police, a third-degree crime; obstructing administration of law and resisting arrest, motor vehicle charges for reckless driving, disregarding an officer's directions, an improper turn in a marked traffic lane and failure to remain in a marked lane. Lauletta had previously been charged with reckless driving in Fairfax County, Virginia, in 2017, and found guilty of failure to obey a highway sign.

Lauletta made his first NFL appearance on December 9 in relief of Eli Manning in a 40–16 victory against the Washington Redskins. He threw five incompletions and an interception to Mason Foster in the fourth quarter, for a passer rating of 0.0. He appeared in one other game, Week 17 against the Dallas Cowboys as a blocker, in the 2018 season.

Lauletta was waived during final roster cuts on August 31, 2019.

=== Philadelphia Eagles ===
Lauletta signed with the practice squad of the Philadelphia Eagles on September 1, 2019. He signed a reserve/future contract with the Eagles on January 6, 2020. He was waived on August 17, 2020.

=== Atlanta Falcons ===
Lauletta was signed by the Atlanta Falcons on September 2, 2020. Three days later on September 5, 2020, Lauletta was waived by the Falcons and re-signed to the practice squad. He was released on September 22, 2020.

=== Cleveland Browns (first stint) ===
On October 16, 2020, Lauletta was signed to the Cleveland Browns' practice squad. He was signed to a reserve/futures contract by the Browns on January 18, 2021. Lauletta was waived by the Browns on August 31, 2021.

=== Jacksonville Jaguars ===
On September 2, 2021, Lauletta was signed to the Jacksonville Jaguars' practice squad.

=== Cleveland Browns (second stint) ===
On December 17, 2021, Lauletta was signed off the Jaguars' practice squad to the Browns' active roster. He was waived by the Browns on January 4, 2022.

=== Pittsburgh Maulers ===
On February 22, 2022, Lauletta was drafted by the Pittsburgh Maulers of the United States Football League (USFL) in the 1st round with the seventh pick of the 2022 USFL draft. He was released on May 25, 2022.

=== New Jersey Generals ===
On May 25, 2022, Lauletta was claimed off waivers by the New Jersey Generals. He was released on June 9, 2023.

Lauletta announced his retirement on September 7, 2023.

=== Jacksonville Sharks ===
On September 15, 2026, it was announced that Lauletta had signed with the Jacksonville Sharks of the Indoor Football League (IFL) for the 2027 season.

== Career statistics ==
=== Professional ===
Year	Team	League	Games		Passing								Rushing			
Year	Team	League	GP	GS	Cmp	Att	Pct	Yds	Y/A	TD	Int	Rtg	Att	Yds	Avg	TD
2018	NYG	NFL	2	0	0	5	0.0	0	0.0	0	1	0.0	1	-2	-2.0	0
2022	PIT	USFL	4	2	31	63	49.2	270	4.3	0	0	60.9	3	18	6.0	0

=== College ===
Season	Team	GP	Passing									Rushing			
Season	Team	GP	Cmp	Att	Pct	Yds	Avg	Lng	TD	Int	Rtg	Att	Yds	Avg	TD
2013	Richmond	3	16	21	76.2	108	5.1	17	2	0	150.8	3	8	2.7	0
2015	Richmond	14	241	391	61.6	3,598	9.2	79	19	15	147.3	78	116	1.5	7
2016	Richmond	11	220	349	63.0	3,022	8.7	66	24	8	153.9	49	−28	−0.6	1
2017	Richmond	11	281	433	64.9	3,737	8.6	93	28	12	153.2	68	90	1.3	4
Career		39	758	1,194	63.5	10,465	8.8	93	73	35	151.4	198	186	0.9	12
