= 2017 Villanova Wildcats football team =

American college football season

2017 Villanova Wildcats football
- Conference: Colonial Athletic Association
- Record: 5–6 (3–5 CAA)
- Head coach: Mark Ferrante (1st season)
- Offensive coordinator: Sam Venuto (19th season)
- Offensive scheme: Multiple spread
- Defensive coordinator: Joe Trainer (9th season)
- Base defense: 3–3–5
- Home stadium: Villanova Stadium

2017 Colonial Athletic Association football standings
	Conf.			Overall
Team	W		L	W		L
No. 2 James Madison $^	8	–	0	14	–	1
No. 11 Stony Brook ^	7	–	1	10	–	3
No. 20 Elon ^	6	–	2	8	–	4
No. 12 New Hampshire ^	5	–	3	9	–	5
Delaware	5	–	3	7	–	4
Richmond	4	–	4	6	–	5
Towson	3	–	5	5	–	6
Villanova	3	–	5	5	–	6
Maine	3	–	5	4	–	6
Albany	2	–	6	4	–	7
Rhode Island	2	–	6	3	–	8
William & Mary	0	–	8	2	–	9
$ – Conference champion; ^ – FCS playoff participant; Rankings from STATS Poll

The 2017 Villanova Wildcats football team represented Villanova University in the 2017 NCAA Division I FCS football season. They were led by first-year head coach Mark Ferrante and played their home games at Villanova Stadium. They were a member of the Colonial Athletic Association. They finished the season 5–6, 3–5 in CAA play to finish in a three-way tie for seventh place.

== Schedule ==
Date	Time	Opponent	Rank	Site	TV	Result	Attendance
September 2	12:30 p.m.	at No. 17 Lehigh*	No. 10	Goodman Stadium; Bethlehem, PA	SE2	W 38–35	5,816
September 9	3:30 p.m.	at Temple*	No. 6	Lincoln Financial Field; Philadelphia, PA (Mayor's Cup)	ESPN3	L 13–16	35,117
September 16	6:00 p.m.	Lafayette*	No. 7	Villanova Stadium; Villanova, PA	ESPN3	W 59–0	9,671
September 23	7:00 p.m.	at Albany	No. 7	Bob Ford Field at Tom & Mary Casey Stadium; Albany, NY	ESPN3	L 10–19 ^{OT}	6,866
September 30	6:00 p.m.	at Towson	No. 14	Johnny Unitas Stadium; Towson, MD	TSN	W 24–9	5,017
October 7	1:00 p.m.	Maine	No. 12	Villanova Stadium; Villanova, PA	CSL	W 31–0	4,505
October 14	3:30 p.m.	at No. 1 James Madison	No. 11	Bridgeforth Stadium; Harrisonburg, VA (College GameDay)	CSL	L 8–30	25,993
October 28	3:30 p.m.	No. 10 Elon^{†}	No. 13	Villanova Stadium; Villanova, PA	NNAA	L 14–19	5,451
November 4	1:00 p.m.	Richmond	No. 20	Villanova Stadium; Villanova, PA	NNAA	L 0–22	3,508
November 11	12:30 p.m.	at Rhode Island		Meade Stadium; Kingston, RI	CSL	L 6–20	2,877
November 18	1:00 p.m.	Delaware		Villanova Stadium; Villanova, PA (Battle of the Blue)	NNAA	W 28–7	5,109
*Non-conference game; ^{†}Homecoming; Rankings from STATS Poll released prior to the game; All times are in Eastern time

== Game summaries ==
=== At Lehigh ===
	1	2	3	4	Total
No. 10 Wildcats	7	21	7	3	38
No. 17 Mountain Hawks	7	7	14	7	35

=== At Temple ===
	1	2	3	4	Total
No. 6 Wildcats	0	0	3	10	13
Owls	3	7	3	3	16

=== Lafayette ===
	1	2	3	4	Total
Leopards	0	0	0	0	0
No. 7 Wildcats	13	36	7	3	59

=== At Albany ===
	1	2	3	4	OT	Total
No. 7 Wildcats	0	0	0	10	0	10
Great Danes	0	3	0	7	9	19

=== At Towson ===
	1	2	3	4	Total
No. 14 Wildcats	7	0	3	14	24
Tigers	0	6	4	0	10

=== Maine ===
	1	2	3	4	Total
Black Bears	0	0	0	0	0
No. 12 Wildcats	7	14	7	3	31

=== At James Madison ===
	1	2	3	4	Total
No. 11 Wildcats	0	0	0	8	8
No. 1 Dukes	3	10	3	14	30

=== Elon ===
	1	2	3	4	Total
No. 10 Phoenix	0	7	3	9	19
No. 13 Wildcats	7	0	7	0	14

=== Richmond ===
	1	2	3	4	Total
Spiders	3	5	14	0	22
No. 20 Wildcats	0	0	0	0	0

=== At Rhode Island ===
	1	2	3	4	Total
Wildcats	3	0	3	0	6
Rams	3	7	10	0	20

=== Delaware ===
	1	2	3	4	Total
Fightin' Blue Hens	0	0	0	7	7
Wildcats	14	0	14	0	28

== Ranking movements ==
Ranking movements Legend: ██ Increase in ranking ██ Decrease in ranking — = Not ranked RV = Received votes
	Week													
Poll	Pre	1	2	3	4	5	6	7	8	9	10	11	12	Final
STATS FCS	10	6	7	7	14	12	11	15	13	20	RV	—	—	—
Coaches	9	8	8	8	17	15	14	16	15	20	RV	—	—	—
