= 2017 James Madison Dukes football team =

American college football season

2017 James Madison Dukes football

CAA champion Lambert Cup winner

NCAA Division I Championship Game, L 13–17 vs. North Dakota State
- Conference: Colonial Athletic Association

Ranking
- STATS: No. 2
- FCS Coaches: No. 2
- Record: 14–1 (8–0 CAA)
- Head coach: Mike Houston (2nd season)
- Offensive coordinator: Donnie Kirkpatrick (2nd season)
- Defensive coordinator: Bob Trott (2nd season)
- Home stadium: Bridgeforth Stadium

2017 Colonial Athletic Association football standings
	Conf.			Overall
Team	W		L	W		L
No. 2 James Madison $^	8	–	0	14	–	1
No. 11 Stony Brook ^	7	–	1	10	–	3
No. 20 Elon ^	6	–	2	8	–	4
No. 12 New Hampshire ^	5	–	3	9	–	5
Delaware	5	–	3	7	–	4
Richmond	4	–	4	6	–	5
Towson	3	–	5	5	–	6
Villanova	3	–	5	5	–	6
Maine	3	–	5	4	–	6
Albany	2	–	6	4	–	7
Rhode Island	2	–	6	3	–	8
William & Mary	0	–	8	2	–	9
$ – Conference champion; ^ – FCS playoff participant; Rankings from STATS Poll

The 2017 James Madison Dukes football team represented James Madison University during the 2017 NCAA Division I FCS football season. They were led by second-year head coach Mike Houston and played their home games at Bridgeforth Stadium and Zane Showker Field. They are a member of the Colonial Athletic Association (CAA). They finished the season 14–1 overall with an 8–0 mark in CAA play to win the conference title and also finished undefeated in the regular season for the second time in school history (the other being 1975, before the Dukes joined the NCAA). They received an automatic bid to the FCS playoffs, where they defeated Stony Brook, Weber State, and South Dakota State to advance to the National Championship Game for the second straight season, where they were defeated 17–13 by North Dakota State.

== Schedule ==
Date	Time	Opponent	Rank	Site	TV	Result	Attendance
September 2	6:00 p.m.	at East Carolina*	No. 1	Dowdy–Ficklen Stadium; Greenville, NC	ESPN3	W 34–14	40,169
September 9	6:00 p.m.	East Tennessee State*	No. 1	Bridgeforth Stadium; Harrisonburg, VA	CSN MA+, MadiZone	W 52–10	24,722
September 16	3:30 p.m.	Norfolk State*	No. 1	Bridgeforth Stadium; Harrisonburg, VA	MASN2, MadiZone	W 75–14	23,118
September 23	1:30 p.m.	Maine	No. 1	Bridgeforth Stadium; Harrisonburg, VA	MASN, MadiZone	W 28–10	25,330
September 30	3:30 p.m.	at Delaware	No. 1	Delaware Stadium; Newark, DE (rivalry)	CSN+, CSN-P	W 20–10	16,372
October 14	3:30 p.m.	No. 11 Villanova	No. 1	Bridgeforth Stadium; Harrisonburg, VA (College GameDay)	CSL, MASN2	W 30–8	25,993
October 21	3:30 p.m.	at William & Mary	No. 1	Zable Stadium; Williamsburg, VA (rivalry)	Cox Yurview, WHSV	W 46–14	13,125
October 28	3:30 p.m.	No. 17 New Hampshire^{†}	No. 1	Bridgeforth Stadium; Harrisonburg, VA	MadiZone	W 21–0	25,298
November 4	Noon	at Rhode Island	No. 1	Meade Stadium; Kingston, RI	CSL	W 38–3	3,227
November 11	3:30 p.m.	Richmond	No. 1	Bridgeforth Stadium; Harrisonburg, VA (rivalry)	MASN2	W 20–13	24,586
November 18	Noon	at No. 11 Elon	No. 1	Rhodes Stadium; Elon, NC	PAA	W 31–3	8,662
December 2	2:00 p.m.	No. 10 Stony Brook*	No. 1	Bridgeforth Stadium; Harrisonburg, VA (FCS Playoffs Second Round)	ESPN3	W 26–7	16,449
December 8	7:00 p.m.	No. 11 Weber State*	No. 1	Bridgeforth Stadium; Harrisonburg, VA (FCS Playoffs Quarterfinals)	ESPN2	W 31–28	13,497
December 16	4:30 p.m.	No. 6 South Dakota State*	No. 1	Bridgeforth Stadium; Harrisonburg, VA (FCS Playoffs Semifinals)	ESPNU	W 51–16	16,528
January 6	12:00 p.m.	vs. No. 2 North Dakota State*	No. 1	Toyota Stadium; Frisco, TX (FCS National Championship Game)	ESPN2	L 13–17	19,090
*Non-conference game; ^{†}Homecoming; Rankings from STATS FCS Poll released prior to game Poll released prior to the game; All times are in Eastern time

== Game summaries ==
=== At East Carolina ===
	1	2	3	4	Total
No. 1 Dukes	7	0	14	13	34
Pirates	0	0	7	7	14

=== East Tennessee State ===
	1	2	3	4	Total
Buccaneers	0	7	3	0	10
No. 1 Dukes	21	7	17	7	52

=== Norfolk State ===
	1	2	3	4	Total
Spartans	0	7	0	7	14
No. 1 Dukes	9	35	17	14	75

=== Maine ===
	1	2	3	4	Total
Black Bears	0	3	7	0	10
No. 1 Dukes	0	7	7	14	28

=== At Delaware ===
	1	2	3	4	Total
No. 1 Dukes	7	10	0	3	20
Fightin' Blue Hens	3	7	0	0	10

=== Villanova ===
	1	2	3	4	Total
No. 11 Wildcats	0	0	0	8	8
No. 1 Dukes	3	10	3	14	30

=== At William & Mary ===
	1	2	3	4	Total
No. 1 Dukes	7	12	10	17	46
Tribe	0	0	0	14	14

=== New Hampshire ===
	1	2	3	4	Total
No. 17 Wildcats	0	0	0	0	0
No. 1 Dukes	0	14	7	0	21

=== At Rhode Island ===
	1	2	3	4	Total
No. 1 Dukes	0	7	17	14	38
Rams	0	3	0	0	3

=== Richmond ===
	1	2	3	4	Total
Spiders	0	7	3	3	13
No. 1 Dukes	0	10	0	10	20

=== At Elon ===
	1	2	3	4	Total
No. 1 Dukes	3	14	7	7	31
No. 11 Phoenix	0	0	0	3	3

== FCS Playoffs ==
=== Second Round–Stony Brook ===
	1	2	3	4	Total
No. 10 Seawolves	0	0	0	7	7
No. 1 Dukes	6	13	0	7	26

=== Quarterfinals–Weber State ===
	1	2	3	4	Total
No. 11 Wildcats	7	0	7	14	28
No. 1 Dukes	7	3	0	21	31

=== Semifinals–South Dakota State ===
	1	2	3	4	Total
No. 6 Jackrabbits	0	10	0	6	16
No. 1 Dukes	7	14	30	0	51

=== National Championship–North Dakota State ===
	1	2	3	4	Total
No. 2 Bison	7	10	0	0	17
No. 1 Dukes	3	3	7	0	13

== Roster ==
2017 James Madison Dukes football team roster
Players
Coaches
Offense

Pos.	#	Name	Class
RB	1	Trai Sharp	Jr
WR	5	Jamir Hudson	Fr
ATH	6	Noah Beckley	Fr
WR	7	Terrence Alls	Sr
WR	8	John Miller	Sr
RB	10	Jack Brigham	Fr
WR	10	Riley Stapleton	So
QB	12	Cole Johnson	So
WR	13	Ishmael Hyman	Sr
WR	14	Braxton Westfield	Fr
QB	15	Gage Moloney	Fr
QB	16	Jesse Layne	Fr
QB	17	Bryan Schor	Sr
WR	18	Hunter Etheridge	Jr
WR	19	Daniel Adu	Fr
WR	19	David Eldridge	Jr
RB	20	Taylor Woods	Sr
RB	22	Eric Kirlew	Fr
RB	25	Cardon Johnson	Sr
RB	29	Marcus Marshall	Jr
RB	31	Percy Agyei-Obese	Fr
WR	34	Devin Floyd	Fr
TE	37	Clayton Cheatham	Fr
OL	53	Joe Fishpaw	Fr
OL	55	Nick Edwards	Sr
OL	58	Gerren Butler	So
OL	60	Jahee Jackson	So
OL	61	A.J. Bolden	Sr
OL	62	Cam Kilgour	Fr
OL	63	J.T. Timming	Fr
OL	67	Zaire Bethea	Fr
OL	68	Tyree Chavious	So
OL	69	Truvell Wilson	So
OL	70	Aaron Stinne	Sr
OL	71	E.J. Donahue	So
OL	72	Will Clevinger	Fr
OL	73	Mac Patrick	So
OL	74	Pika Leota	Fr
OL	75	Michael Faulkner	Fr
OL	76	Jake Glavin	Fr
OL	77	Liam Fornadel	Fr
OL	79	Raymond Gillespie	Fr
OL	81	Nick Carlton	So
TE/LB	82	Joe Hunt	Fr
TE	82	Zach Polglase	Fr
WR/S	83	Kyndel Dean	Fr
WR	83	Josh Sims	Fr
WR	84	Jonathan Newman	Fr
WR	85	Ezrah Archie	Fr
TE	86	Mack Cullen	So
TE	88	Jonathan Kloosterman	Sr
WR	89	Jake Brown	Fr

Defense

Pos.	#	Name	Class
LB	2	Dimitri Holloway	Jr
LB	3	Gus Little	So
S	5	Raven Greene	Sr
CB	6	Jimmy Moreland	Jr
LB	9	Kyre Hawkins	Sr
LB	11	Bryce Maginley	So
LB	12	Trey Wilson	Fr
CB	14	LJ Taylor	Fr
DL	15	Ron'Dell Carter	So
LB	16	John Kinney	Fr
LB	18	Tabb Patrick	Fr
S	21	Adam Smith	So
CB	22	Rashad Robison	Jr
CB	23	Charles Tutt	Jr
S	24	D'Angelo Amos	Fr
CB	24	Sidney Wellons	So
CB	26	Curtis Oliver	Jr
LB	27	Pat Kagel	Sr
S	28	Grant Westbrook	Jr
CB	30	Wesley McCormick	Fr
LB	31	Keshuan Moore	Fr
S	32	MJ Hampton	Fr
S	33	Sam Kidd	Fr
CB	34	Justin Bethea	Sr
CB	35	Taurus Carroll	Fr
CB	36	Robert Carter Jr	Jr
S	38	Mike Cobbs	So
LB	40	Diamonte Tucker-Dorsey	Fr
LB	41	Brett Seigel	Sr
S	42	Michael Johnson	Fr
LB	42	Cade Leonard	Fr
LB	43	Julian Freeze	Fr
DL	43	Garrett Groulx	Fr
S	44	Jordan Brown	Sr
DL	46	David Ezeagwu	Sr
DL	47	Darrious Carter	Jr
S	48	Reggie Collins	Fr
LB	49	Brandon Hereford	Sr
LB	49	Trey Vossler	Fr
LB	51	Devin Medley	Fr
LB	52	Landan Word	So
LB	54	Kevin Azanama	Fr
LB/LS	59	Daniel Caraciolo	Fr
DL	64	Mike Greene	Fr
DL	74	Simeyon Robinson	Sr
DL	90	Rondre Knowles-Tener	Fr
DL	91	Semaj Sorhaindo	Fr
DL	93	Andrew Ankrah	Sr
DL	94	Cornell Urquhart	Sr
DL	95	Adeeb Atariwa	Fr
DL	96	Ryan Etheridge	Jr
LB	99	Isaac Ukwu	Fr

Special teams

Pos.	#	Name	Class
LS	41	Brett Seigel	Sr
K	45	Tyler Gray	Jr
LS	56	Matt Wolcott	Sr
P/K	57	Jeremiah McBride	Fr
P	78	Nik Nunez	Fr
K	91	Ethan Ratke	Fr
P	98	Harry O'Kelly	Fr

Head coach

- Mike Houston

Coordinators/assistant coaches

- Donnie Kirkpatrick (Offensive Coordinator / Quarterbacks)
- Bob Trott (Defensive Coordinator / Safeties)
- Bryan Stinespring (Offensive Line / Run-Game Coordinator)
- Roy Tesh (Outside Linebacker / Special Teams Coordinator)
- Byron Thweatt (Inside Linebackers)
- Jeff Hanson (Defensive Line)
- Tripp Weaver (Cornerbacks / Recruiting Coordinator)
- De'Rail Sims (Running Backs)
- Drew Dudzik (Outside Receivers)
- Fontel Mines (Inside Receivers)

Legend

- (C) Team captain
- (S) Suspended
- (I) Ineligible
- Injured
- Redshirt

[www.jmusports.com/roster.aspx?path=football Roster]
Last update: December 15, 2017

== Ranking movements ==
Ranking movements Legend: ██ Increase in ranking ██ Decrease in ranking ( ) = First-place votes
	Week													
Poll	Pre	1	2	3	4	5	6	7	8	9	10	11	12	Final
STATS FCS	1 (134)	1 (152)	1 (148)	1 (156)	1 (154)	1 (157)	1 (160)	1 (160)	1 (157)	1 (156)	1 (162)	1 (163)	1 (153)	2
Coaches	1 (20)	1 (25)	1 (24)	1 (25)	1 (25)	1 (25)	1 (25)	1 (26)	1 (26)	1 (26)	1 (26)	1 (26)	1 (26)	2 (1)
