= 2017 Stony Brook Seawolves football team =

American college football season

2017 Stony Brook Seawolves football

FCS Playoffs Second Round, L 7–26 vs. James Madison
- Conference: Colonial Athletic Association

Ranking
- STATS: No. 10
- FCS Coaches: No. 11
- Record: 10–3 (7–1 CAA)
- Head coach: Chuck Priore (12th season)
- Co-offensive coordinators: Carmen Felus (1st season); Chris Bache (1st season)
- Defensive coordinator: Bobby McIntyre (1st season)
- Home stadium: Kenneth P. LaValle Stadium

2017 Colonial Athletic Association football standings
	Conf.			Overall
Team	W		L	W		L
No. 2 James Madison $^	8	–	0	14	–	1
No. 11 Stony Brook ^	7	–	1	10	–	3
No. 20 Elon ^	6	–	2	8	–	4
No. 12 New Hampshire ^	5	–	3	9	–	5
Delaware	5	–	3	7	–	4
Richmond	4	–	4	6	–	5
Towson	3	–	5	5	–	6
Villanova	3	–	5	5	–	6
Maine	3	–	5	4	–	6
Albany	2	–	6	4	–	7
Rhode Island	2	–	6	3	–	8
William & Mary	0	–	8	2	–	9
$ – Conference champion; ^ – FCS playoff participant; Rankings from STATS Poll

The 2017 Stony Brook Seawolves football team represented Stony Brook University in the 2017 NCAA Division I FCS football season. The Seawolves competed as fifth-year members of the Colonial Athletic Association with Chuck Priore as the head coach for his twelfth season. They played their home games at Kenneth P. LaValle Stadium in Stony Brook, New York. They finished the season 10–3, 7–1 in CAA play to finish in second place. They received an at-large bid to the FCS Playoffs where they defeated Lehigh in the first round before losing to James Madison in the second round.

== Schedule ==
Date	Time	Opponent	Rank	Site	TV	Result	Attendance
September 2	4:00 p.m.	at No. 19 (FBS) South Florida*		Raymond James Stadium; Tampa, FL	ESPN3	L 17–31	26,460
September 9	1:00 p.m.	at Rhode Island		Meade Stadium; Kingston, RI	CSL	W 35–18	5,102
September 16	6:00 p.m.	Sacred Heart*		Kenneth P. LaValle Stadium; Stony Brook, NY	Wolfievision	W 45–7	8,102
September 23	6:00 p.m.	Towson		Kenneth P. LaValle Stadium; Stony Brook, NY	CSL	W 25–17	6,672
September 30	6:00 p.m.	at William & Mary		Zable Stadium; Williamsburg, VA	TATV	W 21–18	8,082
October 7	6:00 p.m.	Delaware	No. 23	Kenneth P. LaValle Stadium; Stony Brook, NY	Wolfievision	L 20–24	7,694
October 14	6:00 p.m.	No. 12 New Hampshire^{†}		Kenneth P. LaValle Stadium; Stony Brook, NY	Wolfievision	W 38–24	12,311
October 28	3:00 p.m.	at No. 19 Richmond	No. 22	Robins Stadium; Richmond, VA	CSL	W 27–24	8,217
November 4	1:00 p.m.	Albany	No. 14	Kenneth P. LaValle Stadium; Stony Brook, NY (Rivalry)	Wolfievision	W 28–21 ^{OT}	7,106
November 11	1:00 p.m.	Wagner*	No. 12	Kenneth P. LaValle Stadium; Stony Brook, NY	Wolfievision	W 38–10	5,471
November 18	12:00 p.m.	at Maine	No. 10	Alfond Stadium; Orono, ME	MAA	W 20–19	4,983
November 25	2:00 p.m.	Lehigh*	No. 10	Kenneth P. LaValle Stadium; Stony Brook, NY (FCS Playoffs First Round)	ESPN3	W 59–29	4,131
December 2	2:00 p.m.	at No. 1 James Madison*	No. 10	Bridgeforth Stadium; Harrisonburg, VA (FCS Playoffs Second Round)	ESPN3	L 7–26	16,449
*Non-conference game; ^{†}Homecoming; Rankings from STATS Poll released prior to the game; All times are in Eastern time

- Source: Schedule

== Game summaries ==
=== At South Florida ===
	1	2	3	4	Total
Seawolves	7	3	0	7	17
No. 19 (FBS) Bulls	7	0	10	14	31

=== At Rhode Island ===
	1	2	3	4	Total
Seawolves	14	0	7	14	35
Rams	0	0	10	8	18

=== Sacred Heart ===
	1	2	3	4	Total
Pioneers	7	0	0	0	7
Seawolves	14	21	7	3	45

=== Towson ===
	1	2	3	4	Total
Tigers	10	0	7	0	17
Seawolves	7	9	3	6	25

=== At William & Mary ===
	1	2	3	4	Total
Seawolves	7	7	7	0	21
Tribe	0	0	3	15	18

=== Delaware ===
	1	2	3	4	Total
Fightin' Blue Hens	0	7	10	7	24
No. 23 Seawolves	7	13	0	0	20

=== No. 12 New Hampshire ===
	1	2	3	4	Total
No. 12 Wildcats	6	18	0	0	24
Seawolves	9	7	6	16	38

=== At No. 19 Richmond ===
	1	2	3	4	Total
No. 22 Seawolves	7	10	3	7	27
No. 19 Spiders	7	3	7	7	24

=== Albany ===
	1	2	3	4	OT	Total
Great Danes	7	7	0	7	0	21
No. 14 Seawolves	14	7	0	0	7	28

=== Wagner ===
	1	2	3	4	Total
Seahawks	10	0	0	0	10
No. 12 Seawolves	7	7	14	10	38

=== At Maine ===
	1	2	3	4	Total
No. 10 Seawolves	0	7	0	13	20
Black Bears	12	7	0	0	19

== FCS Playoffs ==
=== Lehigh–First Round ===
	1	2	3	4	Total
Mountain Hawks	0	14	7	8	29
No. 10 Seawolves	0	24	14	21	59

=== At No. 1 James Madison–Second Round ===
	1	2	3	4	Total
No. 10 Seawolves	0	0	0	7	7
No. 1 Dukes	6	13	0	7	26

== Ranking movements ==
Ranking movements Legend: ██ Increase in ranking ██ Decrease in ranking — = Not ranked RV = Received votes
	Week													
Poll	Pre	1	2	3	4	5	6	7	8	9	10	11	12	Final
STATS FCS	RV	RV	RV	RV	RV	23	RV	22	22	14	12	10	10	
Coaches	—	—	—	RV	RV	24	RV	RV	RV	21	15	12	11	
