= 2017 Maine Black Bears football team =

American college football season

2017 Maine Black Bears football
- Conference: Colonial Athletic Association
- Record: 4–6 (3–5 CAA)
- Head coach: Joe Harasymiak (2nd season)
- Offensive coordinator: Liam Coen (2nd season)
- Defensive coordinator: Corey Hetherman (2nd season)
- Home stadium: Alfond Stadium

2017 Colonial Athletic Association football standings
	Conf.			Overall
Team	W		L	W		L
No. 2 James Madison $^	8	–	0	14	–	1
No. 11 Stony Brook ^	7	–	1	10	–	3
No. 20 Elon ^	6	–	2	8	–	4
No. 12 New Hampshire ^	5	–	3	9	–	5
Delaware	5	–	3	7	–	4
Richmond	4	–	4	6	–	5
Towson	3	–	5	5	–	6
Villanova	3	–	5	5	–	6
Maine	3	–	5	4	–	6
Albany	2	–	6	4	–	7
Rhode Island	2	–	6	3	–	8
William & Mary	0	–	8	2	–	9
$ – Conference champion; ^ – FCS playoff participant; Rankings from STATS Poll

The 2017 Maine Black Bears football team represented the University of Maine in the 2017 NCAA Division I FCS football season. They were led by second-year head coach Joe Harasymiak and played their home games at Alfond Stadium. They were a member of the Colonial Athletic Association. Maine initially had a game scheduled on September 30 against Central Florida but that game was canceled on September 14 in the aftermath of Hurricane Irma. They finished the season 4–6, 3–5 in CAA play to finish in a three-way tie for seventh place.

== Schedule ==
Date	Time	Opponent	Site	TV	Result	Attendance
August 31	7:00 p.m.	at No. 13 New Hampshire	Wildcat Stadium; Durham, NH (Rivalry)	CSL	L 23–24	15,854
September 9	3:30 p.m.	Bryant*	Alfond Stadium; Orono, ME	FCS	W 60–12	6,313
September 23	1:30 p.m.	at No. 1 James Madison	Bridgeforth Stadium; Harrisonburg, VA	MASN	L 10–28	25,330
October 7	1:00 p.m.	at No. 12 Villanova	Villanova Stadium; Villanova, PA	CSL	L 0–31	4,505
October 14	3:30 p.m.	Rhode Island^{†}	Alfond Stadium; Orono, ME	FCS	W 51–27	9,205
October 21	3:30 p.m.	at Albany	Bob Ford Field at Tom & Mary Casey Stadium; Albany, NY	ESPN3	W 12–10	8,919
October 28	Noon	William & Mary	Alfond Stadium; Orono, ME	FCS	W 23–6	6,579
November 4	2:00 p.m.	Delaware	Fitzpatrick Stadium; Portland, ME	CSL	L 17–31	6,300
November 11	4:00 p.m.	at UMass*	Fenway Park; Boston, MA	NESN+	L 31–44	12,794
November 18	Noon	No. 10 Stony Brook	Alfond Stadium; Orono, ME	MAA	L 19–20	4,983
*Non-conference game; ^{†}Homecoming; Rankings from STATS Poll released prior to the game; All times are in Eastern time

== Game summaries ==
=== At New Hampshire ===
	1	2	3	4	Total
Black Bears	7	3	7	6	23
No. 13 Wildcats	14	3	0	7	24

=== Bryant ===
	1	2	3	4	Total
Bulldogs	3	2	7	0	12
Black Bears	14	29	7	10	60

=== At James Madison ===
	1	2	3	4	Total
Black Bears	0	3	7	0	10
No. 1 Dukes	0	7	7	14	28

=== At Villanova ===
	1	2	3	4	Total
Black Bears	0	0	0	0	0
No. 12 Wildcats	7	14	7	3	31

=== Rhode Island ===
	1	2	3	4	Total
Rams	14	7	0	6	27
Black Bears	7	16	28	0	51

=== At Albany ===
	1	2	3	4	Total
Black Bears	0	9	0	3	12
Great Danes	7	0	3	0	10

=== William & Mary ===
	1	2	3	4	Total
Tribe	3	0	3	0	6
Black Bears	3	10	0	10	23

=== Delaware ===
	1	2	3	4	Total
Fightin' Blue Hens	0	14	3	14	31
Black Bears	10	0	7	0	17

=== At UMass ===
	1	2	3	4	Total
Black Bears	7	9	8	7	31
Minutemen	21	3	13	7	44

=== Stony Brook ===
	1	2	3	4	Total
No. 10 Seawolves	0	7	0	13	20
Black Bears	12	7	0	0	19

== After the season ==
The following Black Bear was selected in the 2018 NFL draft after the season.

Round	Pick	Player	Position	NFL club
6	192	Jamil Demby	Tackle	Los Angeles Rams
