= 2017 Albany Great Danes football team =

American college football season

2017 Albany Great Danes football
- Conference: Colonial Athletic Association
- Record: 4–7 (2–6 CAA)
- Head coach: Greg Gattuso (4th season)
- Offensive coordinator: Joe Bernard (4th season)
- Defensive coordinator: Bob Benson (4th season)
- Home stadium: Bob Ford Field at Tom & Mary Casey Stadium

2017 Colonial Athletic Association football standings
	Conf.			Overall
Team	W		L	W		L
No. 2 James Madison $^	8	–	0	14	–	1
No. 11 Stony Brook ^	7	–	1	10	–	3
No. 20 Elon ^	6	–	2	8	–	4
No. 12 New Hampshire ^	5	–	3	9	–	5
Delaware	5	–	3	7	–	4
Richmond	4	–	4	6	–	5
Towson	3	–	5	5	–	6
Villanova	3	–	5	5	–	6
Maine	3	–	5	4	–	6
Albany	2	–	6	4	–	7
Rhode Island	2	–	6	3	–	8
William & Mary	0	–	8	2	–	9
$ – Conference champion; ^ – FCS playoff participant; Rankings from STATS Poll

The 2017 Albany Great Danes football team represented the University at Albany, SUNY as a member of the Colonial Athletic Association (CAA) during the 2017 NCAA Division I FCS football season. Led by fourth-year head coach Greg Gattuso, the Great Danes compiled an overall record of 4–7 with a mark of 2–6 in conference play, tying for tenth place in the CAA. The team played home games at Bob Ford Field at Tom & Mary Casey Stadium in Albany, New York.

== Schedule ==
Date	Time	Opponent	Rank	Site	TV	Result	Attendance
September 2	6:00 p.m.	at Old Dominion*	No. 24	Foreman Field; Norfolk, VA	ESPN3	L 17–31	20,118
September 9	1:00 p.m.	at Morgan State*		Hughes Stadium; Baltimore, MD	Facebook	W 26–0	3,789
September 16	7:00 p.m.	Monmouth*		Bob Ford Field at Tom & Mary Casey Stadium; Albany, NY	ESPN3	W 28–14	6,384
September 23	7:00 p.m.	No. 7 Villanova		Bob Ford Field at Tom & Mary Casey Stadium; Albany, NY	ESPN3	W 19–10 ^{OT}	6,866
September 30	2:00 p.m.	at No. 23 Elon	No. 19	Rhodes Stadium; Elon, NC	CSL	L 0–6	5,024
October 7	3:00 p.m.	at No. 14 Richmond	No. 24	Robins Stadium; Richmond, VA	NBCS WA+	L 38–41 ^{2OT}	8,217
October 21	3:30 p.m.	Maine		Bob Ford Field at Tom & Mary Casey Stadium; Albany, NY	ESPN3	L 10–12	8,919
October 28	1:00 p.m.	Rhode Island		Bob Ford Field at Tom & Mary Casey Stadium; Albany, NY	ESPN3	L 14–31	3,383
November 4	1:00 p.m.	at No. 14 Stony Brook		Kenneth P. LaValle Stadium; Stony Brook, NY (rivalry)	Wolfievision	L 21–28 ^{OT}	7,106
November 11	3:30 p.m.	at Delaware		Delaware Stadium; Newark, DE	NBCS P, NBCS RN	L 3–22	16,333
November 18	1:00 p.m.	No. 16 New Hampshire		Bob Ford Field at Tom & Mary Casey Stadium; Albany, NY	CSL	W 15–0	3,459
*Non-conference game; Rankings from STATS Poll released prior to the game; All times are in Eastern time

== Game summaries ==
=== At Old Dominion ===
	1	2	3	4	Total
No. 24 Great Danes	3	0	0	14	17
Monarchs	7	14	3	7	31

=== At Morgan State ===
	1	2	3	4	Total
Great Danes	0	7	16	3	26
Bears	0	0	0	0	0

=== Monmouth ===
	1	2	3	4	Total
Hawks	0	7	7	0	14
Great Danes	13	9	0	6	28

=== Villanova ===
	1	2	3	4	OT	Total
No. 7 Wildcats	0	0	0	10	0	10
Great Danes	0	3	0	7	9	19

=== At Elon ===
	1	2	3	4	Total
No. 19 Great Danes	0	0	0	0	0
No. 23 Phoenix	0	3	0	3	6

=== At Richmond ===
	1	2	3	4	OT	Total
No. 24 Great Danes	0	14	10	7	7	38
No. 14 Spiders	0	14	7	10	10	41

=== Maine ===
	1	2	3	4	Total
Black Bears	0	9	0	3	12
Great Danes	7	0	3	0	10

=== Rhode Island ===
	1	2	3	4	Total
Rams	6	15	3	7	31
Great Danes	0	0	7	7	14

=== At Stony Brook ===
	1	2	3	4	OT	Total
Great Danes	7	7	0	7	0	21
No. 14 Seawolves	14	7	0	0	7	28

=== At Delaware ===
	1	2	3	4	Total
Great Danes	3	0	0	0	3
Fightin' Blue Hens	0	3	5	14	22

=== New Hampshire ===
	1	2	3	4	Total
No. 16 Wildcats	0	0	0	0	0
Great Danes	0	3	9	3	15

== Ranking movements ==
Ranking movements Legend: ██ Increase in ranking ██ Decrease in ranking — = Not ranked RV = Received votes
	Week													
Poll	Pre	1	2	3	4	5	6	7	8	9	10	11	12	Final
STATS FCS	24	RV	RV	RV	19	24	RV	RV	RV	—	—	—	—	
Coaches	RV	RV	—	RV	22	RV	RV	RV	—	—	—	—	—	
