= 2017 Delaware Fightin' Blue Hens football team =

American college football season

2017 Delaware Fightin' Blue Hens football
- Conference: Colonial Athletic Association
- Record: 7–4 (5–3 CAA)
- Head coach: Danny Rocco (1st season)
- Offensive coordinator: Sean Devine (1st season)
- Offensive scheme: Multiple
- Defensive coordinator: Chris Cosh (1st season)
- Base defense: 4–3
- Home stadium: Delaware Stadium

2017 Colonial Athletic Association football standings
	Conf.			Overall
Team	W		L	W		L
No. 2 James Madison $^	8	–	0	14	–	1
No. 11 Stony Brook ^	7	–	1	10	–	3
No. 20 Elon ^	6	–	2	8	–	4
No. 12 New Hampshire ^	5	–	3	9	–	5
Delaware	5	–	3	7	–	4
Richmond	4	–	4	6	–	5
Towson	3	–	5	5	–	6
Villanova	3	–	5	5	–	6
Maine	3	–	5	4	–	6
Albany	2	–	6	4	–	7
Rhode Island	2	–	6	3	–	8
William & Mary	0	–	8	2	–	9
$ – Conference champion; ^ – FCS playoff participant; Rankings from STATS Poll

The 2017 Delaware Fightin' Blue Hens football team represented the University of Delaware as a member of the Colonial Athletic Association (CAA) during the 2017 NCAA Division I FCS football season. Led by first-year head coach Danny Rocco, the Fightin' Blue Hens compiled an overall record of 7–4 with a mark of 5–3 in conference play, tying for fourth place in the CAA. The team played home games at Delaware Stadium in Newark, Delaware.

== Schedule ==
Date	Time	Opponent	Rank	Site	TV	Result	Attendance
August 31	7:00 p.m.	Delaware State*		Delaware Stadium; Newark, DE (Route 1 Rivalry)	BHAA	W 22–3	18,040
September 9	3:30 p.m.	at Virginia Tech*		Lane Stadium; Blacksburg, VA	ACCN Extra	L 0–27	62,526
September 16	3:30 p.m.	Cornell*		Delaware Stadium; Newark, DE	BHAA	W 41–14	14,714
September 30	3:30 p.m.	No. 1 James Madison		Delaware Stadium; Newark, DE (rivalry)	CSN+, CSN-P	L 10–20	16,372
October 7	6:00 p.m.	at No. 23 Stony Brook		Kenneth P. LaValle Stadium; Stony Brook, NY	Wolfievision	W 24–20	7,694
October 14	3:30 p.m.	William & Mary		Delaware Stadium; Newark, DE (rivalry)	NBCS RN, NBCS P	W 17–0	18,721
October 21	3:30 p.m.	No. 11 Richmond^{†}		Delaware Stadium; Newark, DE	CSL	W 42–35 ^{2OT}	15,710
October 28	4:00 p.m.	at Towson	No. 23	Johnny Unitas Stadium; Towson, MD	FSGO	L 17–18	6,402
November 4	2:00 p.m.	at Maine		Fitzpatrick Stadium; Portland, ME	CSL	W 31–17	7,212
November 11	3:30 p.m.	Albany		Delaware Stadium; Newark, DE	NBCS RN, NBCS P	W 22–3	16,333
November 18	1:00 p.m.	at Villanova		Villanova Stadium; Villanova, PA (Battle of the Blue)	FSGO	L 7–28	5,109
*Non-conference game; ^{†}Homecoming; Rankings from STATS Poll released prior to the game; All times are in Eastern time

== Coaching staff ==
Name	Position	Year	Alma mater
Danny Rocco	Head coach	1st	Wake Forest (1984)
Matt Simon	Offensive coordinator/quarterbacks	1st	Eastern New Mexico (1976)
Chris Cosh	Defensive coordinator/defensive backs	1st	Virginia Tech (1984)
Eddie Allen	Special teams coordinator/running backs	4th	New Haven (2003)
Blaine McCorkle	Offensive line	1st	Louisiana State (2000)
Levern Belin	Wide receivers	1st	Virginia (2007)
Bill Polin	Tight ends	1st	Colby (2000)
Manny Rojas	Inside Linebackers	1st	Liberty (2007)
Clint Sintim	Outside Linebackers	1st	Virginia (2009)
Wes Reber	Defensive Quality Control	1st	Duquesne (2012)
Chris Stewart	Strength and conditioning	1st	Western Carolina (1998)
Carl Kotz	Director of football operations	1st	Clemson (2003)
Tony Palmieri	Video coordinator	1st	North Florida (2009)
Jude Moser	Administrative Assistant	8th	University of Delaware(1984)

== Game summaries ==
=== Delaware State ===
	1	2	3	4	Total
Hornets	0	3	0	0	3
Blue Hens	2	6	7	7	22

=== At Virginia Tech ===
	1	2	3	4	Total
Blue Hens	0	0	0	0	0
Hokies	7	10	0	10	27

=== Cornell ===
	1	2	3	4	Total
Big Red	0	0	7	7	14
Blue Hens	10	17	7	7	41

=== James Madison ===
	1	2	3	4	Total
No. 1 Dukes	7	10	0	3	20
Blue Hens	3	7	0	0	10

=== At Stony Brook ===
	1	2	3	4	Total
Blue Hens	0	7	10	7	24
No. 23 Seawolves	7	13	0	0	20

=== William & Mary ===
	1	2	3	4	Total
Tribe	0	0	0	0	0
Blue Hens	0	10	0	7	17

=== Richmond ===
	1	2	3	4	OT	2OT	Total
No. 11 Spiders	7	7	14	0	7	0	35
Blue Hens	14	7	0	7	7	7	42

=== At Towson ===
	1	2	3	4	Total
No. 23 Blue Hens	0	7	7	3	17
Tigers	3	0	8	7	18

=== At Maine ===
	1	2	3	4	Total
Blue Hens	0	14	3	14	31
Black Bears	10	0	7	0	17

=== Albany ===
	1	2	3	4	Total
Great Danes	3	0	0	0	3
Blue Hens	0	3	5	14	22

=== At Villanova ===
	1	2	3	4	Total
Blue Hens	0	0	0	7	7
Wildcats	14	0	14	0	28

== Ranking movements ==
Ranking movements Legend: ██ Increase in ranking ██ Decrease in ranking — = Not ranked RV = Received votes
	Week													
Poll	Pre	1	2	3	4	5	6	7	8	9	10	11	12	Final
STATS FCS	RV	RV	RV	RV	RV	RV	RV	RV	23	RV	RV	RV	RV	RV
Coaches	—	RV	—	—	—	—	RV	RV	RV	RV	RV	RV	RV	RV
