= 2017 Towson Tigers football team =

American college football season

2017 Towson Tigers football
- Conference: Colonial Athletic Association
- Record: 5–6 (3–5 CAA)
- Head coach: Rob Ambrose (9th season)
- Offensive coordinator: Jared Ambrose (6th season)
- Defensive coordinator: Lyndon Johnson (1st season)
- Home stadium: Johnny Unitas Stadium

2017 Colonial Athletic Association football standings
	Conf.			Overall
Team	W		L	W		L
No. 2 James Madison $^	8	–	0	14	–	1
No. 11 Stony Brook ^	7	–	1	10	–	3
No. 20 Elon ^	6	–	2	8	–	4
No. 12 New Hampshire ^	5	–	3	9	–	5
Delaware	5	–	3	7	–	4
Richmond	4	–	4	6	–	5
Towson	3	–	5	5	–	6
Villanova	3	–	5	5	–	6
Maine	3	–	5	4	–	6
Albany	2	–	6	4	–	7
Rhode Island	2	–	6	3	–	8
William & Mary	0	–	8	2	–	9
$ – Conference champion; ^ – FCS playoff participant; Rankings from STATS Poll

The 2017 Towson Tigers football team represented Towson University in the 2017 NCAA Division I FCS football season. They were led by ninth-year head coach Rob Ambrose and played their home games at Johnny Unitas Stadium. They were a member of the Colonial Athletic Association. They finished the season 5–6, 3–5 in CAA play to finish in a three-way tie for seventh place.

== Schedule ==
Date	Time	Opponent	Site	TV	Result	Attendance
September 2	6:00 p.m.	Morgan State*	Johnny Unitas Stadium; Towson, MD (Battle for Greater Baltimore)	SPORTSfever TV, ESPN3	W 10–0	6,563
September 9	12:00 p.m.	at Maryland*	Maryland Stadium; College Park, MD	BTN	L 17–63	37,105
September 16	7:00 p.m.	at Saint Francis (PA)*	DeGol Field; Loretto, PA	NECFR	W 16–14	2,412
September 23	6:00 p.m.	at Stony Brook	Kenneth P. LaValle Stadium; Stony Brook, NY	CSL	L 17–25	6,672
September 30	6:00 p.m.	No. 14 Villanova	Johnny Unitas Stadium; Towson, MD	TSN	L 9–24	5,017
October 14	4:00 p.m.	No. 13 Richmond	Johnny Unitas Stadium; Towson, MD	FSGO	L 3–23	5,768
October 21	2:00 p.m.	at No. 18 New Hampshire	Wildcat Stadium; Durham, NH	UNHAthletics via YouTube	L 17–40	10,522
October 28	4:00 p.m.	No. 23 Delaware^{†}	Johnny Unitas Stadium; Towson, MD	FSGO	W 18–17	6,402
November 4	2:00 p.m.	at No. 7 Elon	Rhodes Stadium; Elon, NC	PAA	L 30–33 ^{2OT}	10,113
November 11	2:00 p.m.	at William & Mary	Zable Stadium; Williamsburg, VA	CSL	W 26–14	6,234
November 18	2:00 p.m.	Rhode Island	Johnny Unitas Stadium; Towson, MD	TSN	W 29–10	3,134
*Non-conference game; ^{†}Homecoming; Rankings from STATS Poll released prior to the game; All times are in Eastern time

== Game summaries ==
=== Morgan State ===
	1	2	3	4	Total
Bears	0	0	0	0	0
Tigers	0	10	0	0	10

=== At Maryland ===
	1	2	3	4	Total
Tigers	0	7	0	10	17
Terrapins	21	7	21	14	63

=== At Saint Francis (PA) ===
	1	2	3	4	Total
Tigers	0	0	3	13	16
Red Flash	0	7	0	7	14

=== At Stony Brook ===
	1	2	3	4	Total
Tigers	10	0	7	0	17
Seawolves	7	9	3	6	25

=== No. 14 Villanova ===
	1	2	3	4	Total
No. 14 Wildcats	7	0	3	14	24
Tigers	0	6	3	0	9

=== No. 13 Richmond ===
	1	2	3	4	Total
No. 13 Spiders	7	10	0	6	23
Tigers	0	0	0	3	3

=== At No. 18 New Hampshire ===
	1	2	3	4	Total
Tigers	3	0	0	14	17
No. 18 Wildcats	7	26	7	0	40

=== No. 23 Delaware ===
	1	2	3	4	Total
No. 23 Fightin' Blue Hens	0	7	7	3	17
Tigers	3	0	8	7	18

=== At No. 7 Elon ===
	1	2	3	4	OT	Total
Tigers	10	0	0	17	3	30
No. 7 Phoenix	7	7	10	3	6	33

=== At William & Mary ===
	1	2	3	4	Total
Tigers	12	0	0	14	26
Tribe	7	7	0	0	14

=== Rhode Island ===
	1	2	3	4	Total
Rams	7	3	0	0	10
Tigers	2	13	7	7	29
