= 2017 Elon Phoenix football team =

American college football season

2017 Elon Phoenix football

NCAA Division I First Round, L 27–28 vs. Furman
- Conference: Colonial Athletic Association

Ranking
- STATS: No. 20
- FCS Coaches: No. 21
- Record: 8–4 (6–2 CAA)
- Head coach: Curt Cignetti (1st season)
- Offensive coordinator: Drew Folmar (1st season)
- Defensive coordinator: Tony Trisciani (1st season)
- Home stadium: Rhodes Stadium

2017 Colonial Athletic Association football standings
| | Conf. | | | Overall |
| Team | W | | L | W | | L |
|---|---|---|---|---|---|---|
| No. 2 James Madison $^ | 8 | – | 0 | 14 | – | 1 |
| No. 11 Stony Brook ^ | 7 | – | 1 | 10 | – | 3 |
| No. 20 Elon ^ | 6 | – | 2 | 8 | – | 4 |
| No. 12 New Hampshire ^ | 5 | – | 3 | 9 | – | 5 |
| Delaware | 5 | – | 3 | 7 | – | 4 |
| Richmond | 4 | – | 4 | 6 | – | 5 |
| Towson | 3 | – | 5 | 5 | – | 6 |
| Villanova | 3 | – | 5 | 5 | – | 6 |
| Maine | 3 | – | 5 | 4 | – | 6 |
| Albany | 2 | – | 6 | 4 | – | 7 |
| Rhode Island | 2 | – | 6 | 3 | – | 8 |
| William & Mary | 0 | – | 8 | 2 | – | 9 |
$ – Conference champion; ^ – FCS playoff participant; Rankings from STATS Poll

The 2017 Elon Phoenix football team represented Elon University in the 2017 NCAA Division I FCS football season. They were led by first-year head coach Curt Cignetti and played their home games at Rhodes Stadium. They were members of the Colonial Athletic Association (CAA). They finished the season 8–4, 6–2 in CAA play to finish in third place. They received an at-large bid to the FCS Playoffs where they lost to Furman in the first round.

== Preseason poll ==
First place votes in parentheses

| Place | School |
|---|---|
| 1 | James Madison (21) |
| 2 | Richmond (3) |
| 3 | Villanova |
| 4 | New Hampshire |
| 5 | Delaware |
| 6 | Albany |
| 7 | William & Mary |
| 8 | Stony Brook |
| 9 | Maine |
| 10 | Towson |
| 11 | Elon |
| 12 | Rhode Island |

== Schedule ==
| Date | Time | Opponent | Rank | Site | TV | Result | Attendance |
|---|---|---|---|---|---|---|---|
| August 31 | 7:00 p.m. | at Toledo* | | Glass Bowl; Toledo, OH | ESPN3 | L 13–47 | 22,104 |
| September 9 | 1:00 p.m. | at Furman* | | Paladin Stadium; Greenville, SC | ESPN3 | W 34–31 | 6,342 |
| September 16 | 6:00 p.m. | No. 16 Charleston Southern* | | Rhodes Stadium; Elon, NC | CSL | W 19–17 | 5,248 |
| September 23 | 6:00 p.m. | at No. 8 Richmond | | E. Claiborne Robins Stadium; Richmond, VA | CSN+ | W 36–33 | 8,217 |
| September 30 | 2:00 p.m. | No. 19 Albany | No. 23 | Rhodes Stadium; Elon, NC | CSL | W 6–0 | 5,024 |
| October 7 | 2:00 p.m. | William & Mary | No. 18 | Rhodes Stadium; Elon, NC | PAA | W 25–17 | 10,137 |
| October 21 | Noon | at Rhode Island | No. 14 | Meade Stadium; Kingston, RI | CSL | W 35–34 | 7,221 |
| October 28 | 3:30 p.m. | at No. 13 Villanova | No. 10 | Villanova Stadium; Villanova, PA | NNAA | W 19–14 | 5,451 |
| November 4 | 2:00 p.m. | Towson^{†} | No. 7 | Rhodes Stadium; Elon, NC | PAA | W 33–30 ^{2OT} | 10,113 |
| November 11 | 2:00 p.m. | at No. 18 New Hampshire | No. 7 | Wildcat Stadium; Durham, NH | FCS; FSGO | L 6–16 | 7,294 |
| November 18 | Noon | No. 1 James Madison | No. 11 | Rhodes Stadium; Elon, NC | PAA | L 3–31 | 8,662 |
| November 25 | 2:00 p.m. | No. 22 Furman* | No. 15 | Rhodes Stadium; Elon, NC (FCS Playoffs First Round) | ESPN3 | L 27–28 | 2,934 |
*Non-conference game; ^{†}Homecoming; Rankings from STATS Poll released prior to the game; All times are in Eastern time

== Game summaries ==
=== At Toledo ===
| | 1 | 2 | 3 | 4 | Total |
|---|---|---|---|---|---|
| Phoenix | 0 | 7 | 0 | 6 | 13 |
| Rockets | 13 | 6 | 21 | 7 | 47 |

=== At Furman ===
| | 1 | 2 | 3 | 4 | Total |
|---|---|---|---|---|---|
| Phoenix | 21 | 0 | 3 | 10 | 34 |
| Paladins | 0 | 10 | 21 | 0 | 31 |

=== Charleston Southern ===
| | 1 | 2 | 3 | 4 | Total |
|---|---|---|---|---|---|
| No. 16 Buccaneers | 0 | 7 | 0 | 10 | 17 |
| Phoenix | 6 | 7 | 6 | 0 | 19 |

=== At Richmond ===
| | 1 | 2 | 3 | 4 | Total |
|---|---|---|---|---|---|
| Phoenix | 6 | 13 | 7 | 10 | 36 |
| No. 8 Spiders | 7 | 7 | 12 | 7 | 33 |

=== Albany ===
| | 1 | 2 | 3 | 4 | Total |
|---|---|---|---|---|---|
| No. 19 Great Danes | 0 | 0 | 0 | 0 | 0 |
| No. 23 Phoenix | 0 | 3 | 0 | 3 | 6 |

=== William & Mary ===
| | 1 | 2 | 3 | 4 | Total |
|---|---|---|---|---|---|
| Tribe | 0 | 3 | 14 | 0 | 17 |
| No. 18 Phoenix | 6 | 17 | 0 | 2 | 25 |

=== At Rhode Island ===
| | 1 | 2 | 3 | 4 | Total |
|---|---|---|---|---|---|
| No. 14 Phoenix | 14 | 7 | 7 | 7 | 35 |
| Rams | 7 | 20 | 7 | 0 | 34 |

=== At Villanova ===
| | 1 | 2 | 3 | 4 | Total |
|---|---|---|---|---|---|
| No. 10 Phoenix | 0 | 7 | 3 | 9 | 19 |
| No. 13 Wildcats | 7 | 0 | 7 | 0 | 14 |

=== Towson ===
| | 1 | 2 | 3 | 4 | OT | 2OT | Total |
|---|---|---|---|---|---|---|---|
| Tigers | 10 | 0 | 0 | 17 | 3 | 0 | 30 |
| No. 7 Phoenix | 7 | 7 | 10 | 3 | 3 | 3 | 33 |

=== At New Hampshire ===
| | 1 | 2 | 3 | 4 | Total |
|---|---|---|---|---|---|
| No. 7 Phoenix | 0 | 0 | 0 | 6 | 6 |
| No. 18 Wildcats | 0 | 7 | 9 | 0 | 16 |

=== James Madison ===
| | 1 | 2 | 3 | 4 | Total |
|---|---|---|---|---|---|
| No. 1 Dukes | 3 | 14 | 7 | 7 | 31 |
| No. 11 Phoenix | 0 | 0 | 0 | 3 | 3 |

== FCS Playoffs ==
=== Furman–First Round ===
| | 1 | 2 | 3 | 4 | Total |
|---|---|---|---|---|---|
| No. 22 Paladins | 0 | 14 | 7 | 7 | 28 |
| No. 15 Phoenix | 7 | 0 | 14 | 6 | 27 |

== Ranking movements ==
Ranking movements Legend: ██ Increase in ranking ██ Decrease in ranking — = Not ranked RV = Received votes
| | Week | | | | | | | | | | | | | |
| Poll | Pre | 1 | 2 | 3 | 4 | 5 | 6 | 7 | 8 | 9 | 10 | 11 | 12 | Final |
|---|---|---|---|---|---|---|---|---|---|---|---|---|---|---|
| STATS FCS | — | — | — | RV | 23 | 18 | 16 | 14 | 10 | 7 | 7 | 11 | 15 | 20 |
| Coaches | — | — | — | — | RV | 23 | 20 | 15 | 11 | 10 | 9 | 15 | 17 | 21 |
