= 2017 Bucknell Bison football team =

American college football season

2017 Bucknell Bison football
- Conference: Patriot League
- Record: 5–6 (2–4 Patriot)
- Head coach: Joe Susan (8th season)
- Offensive coordinator: Mike O'Connor
- Defensive coordinator: Matt Borich
- Home stadium: Christy Mathewson–Memorial Stadium

2017 Patriot League football standings
	Conf.			Overall
Team	W		L	W		L
Colgate +	5	–	1	7	–	4
Lehigh +^	5	–	1	5	–	7
Holy Cross	3	–	3	4	–	7
Fordham	3	–	3	4	–	7
Lafayette	3	–	3	3	–	8
Bucknell	2	–	4	5	–	6
Georgetown	0	–	6	1	–	10
+ – Conference co-champions; ^ – FCS playoff participant

The 2017 Bucknell Bison football team represented Bucknell University in the 2017 NCAA Division I FCS football season. They were led by eighth-year head coach Joe Susan and played their home games at Christy Mathewson–Memorial Stadium. They were a member of the Patriot League. They finished the season 5–6, 2–4 in Patriot League play to finish in sixth place.

== Schedule ==
Date	Time	Opponent	Site	TV	Result	Attendance
September 2	6:00 p.m.	Marist*	Christy Mathewson–Memorial Stadium; Lewisburg, PA	Stadium	W 45–6	3,024
September 9	Noon	Holy Cross	Christy Mathewson–Memorial Stadium; Lewisburg, PA	Stadium	L 0–20	1,987
September 16	6:00 p.m.	at William & Mary*	Zable Stadium; Williamsburg, VA	TATV	L 9–30	8,315
September 23	6:00 p.m.	Sacred Heart*	Christy Mathewson–Memorial Stadium; Lewisburg, PA	Stadium	W 34–31	4,345
September 30	6:00 p.m.	Monmouth*	Christy Mathewson–Memorial Stadium; Lewisburg, PA	Stadium	L 13–35	1,942
October 14	1:30 p.m.	at Cornell*	Schoellkopf Field; Ithaca, NY	ILN	W 26–18	4,202
October 21	3:30 p.m.	at Lafayette	Fisher Stadium; Easton, PA	Stadium	W 13–7 ^{OT}	5,512
October 28	1:00 p.m.	at Colgate	Crown Field at Andy Kerr Stadium; Hamilton, NY	Stadium	L 3–40	6,763
November 4	12:00 p.m.	Lehigh^{†}	Christy Mathewson–Memorial Field; Lewisburg, PA	Stadium	L 21–42	4,226
November 11	12:00 p.m.	Georgetown	Christy Mathewson–Memorial Field; Lewisburg, PA	Stadium	W 12–0	1,794
November 18	1:00 p.m.	at Fordham	Coffey Field; Bronx, NY	Stadium	L 9–20	2,961
*Non-conference game; ^{†}Homecoming; All times are in Eastern time

== Game summaries ==
=== Marist ===
	1	2	3	4	Total
Red Foxes	0	6	0	0	6
Bison	28	7	3	7	45

=== Holy Cross ===
	1	2	3	4	Total
Crusaders	10	3	7	0	20
Bison	0	0	0	0	0

=== At William & Mary ===
	1	2	3	4	Total
Bison	0	9	0	0	9
Tribe	7	3	20	0	30

=== Sacred Heart ===
	1	2	3	4	Total
Pioneers	0	10	7	14	31
Bison	14	3	7	10	34

=== Monmouth ===
	1	2	3	4	Total
Hawks	7	14	14	0	35
Bison	0	6	0	7	13

=== At Cornell ===
	1	2	3	4	Total
Bison	7	3	13	3	26
Big Red	0	3	7	8	18

=== At Lafayette ===
	1	2	3	4	OT	Total
Bison	7	0	0	0	6	13
Leopards	0	0	7	0	0	7

=== At Colgate ===
	1	2	3	4	Total
Bison	3	0	0	0	3
Raiders	6	27	0	7	40

=== Lehigh ===
	1	2	3	4	Total
Mountain Hawks	28	7	7	0	42
Bison	7	7	0	7	21

=== Georgetown ===
	1	2	3	4	Total
Hoyas	0	0	0	0	0
Bison	0	3	9	0	12

=== At Fordham ===
	1	2	3	4	Total
Bison	0	0	3	6	9
Rams	0	7	0	13	20
