= 2017 NCAA Division I FCS football season =

American college football season

2017 NCAA Division I FCS season

Regular season
- Number of teams: 124
- Duration: August 26 – November 18
- Payton Award: Sam Houston State quarterback Jeremiah Briscoe
- Buchanan Award: Jacksonville State defensive end Darius Jackson

Playoff
- Duration: November 25 – December 16
- Championship date: January 6, 2018
- Championship site: Toyota Stadium, Frisco, Texas
- Champion: North Dakota State

NCAA Division I FCS football seasons
- «2016 2018»

The 2017 NCAA Division I FCS football season, part of college football in the United States, was organized by the National Collegiate Athletic Association (NCAA) at the Division I Football Championship Subdivision (FCS) level. The FCS Championship Game was played on January 6, 2018, in Frisco, Texas. The North Dakota State Bison beat the James Madison Dukes, 17–13, to capture their sixth title in seven years.

== Conference changes and new programs ==
For the first time since 2012 (and just the second time ever), there were no independent programs in FCS during the 2017 season.

School	2016 conference	2017 conference
Coastal Carolina	FCS Independent	Sun Belt (FBS)

== Notable changes ==
On April 14, the NCAA Division I Council approved a suite of rule changes affecting the recruiting process. The changes most significant to FCS football were to take effect with the 2017–18 school year. A national early signing period for high school players was to be introduced for FBS and FCS, at a time in December to be announced later, and FCS programs would no longer have any restriction on the number of new players that may be signed to letters of intent or financial aid agreements. Previously, FCS teams were limited to signing 30 new players per year.

== FCS team wins over FBS teams ==
Italics denotes FBS teams.

Date	Visiting team	Home team	Site	Result	Attendance	Ref.
August 31	Tennessee State	Georgia State	Georgia State Stadium • Atlanta, Georgia	17–10	24,333	
September 2	Howard	UNLV	Sam Boyd Stadium • Whitney, Nevada	43–40	15,667	
September 2	No. 1 James Madison	East Carolina	Dowdy–Ficklen Stadium • Greenville, North Carolina	34–14	40,169	
September 2	Liberty	Baylor	McLane Stadium • Waco, Texas	48–45	45,784	
September 9	No. 12 New Hampshire	Georgia Southern	Legion Field • Birmingham, Alabama	22–12	3,387	
September 9	South Dakota	Bowling Green	Doyt Perry Stadium • Bowling Green, Ohio	35–27	17,912	
September 16	Idaho State	Nevada	Mackay Stadium • Reno, Nevada	30–28	16,394	
September 16	No. 25 North Carolina A&T	Charlotte	Jerry Richardson Stadium • Charlotte, North Carolina	35–31	18,651	
September 23	No. 19 Western Illinois	Coastal Carolina	Brooks Stadium • Conway, South Carolina	52–10	14,996	
^{#}Rankings from STATS poll released prior to the game.

== Conference standings ==
2017 Big Sky Conference football standings
	Conf.			Overall
Team	W		L	W		L
No. 14 Southern Utah +^	7	–	1	9	–	3
No. 5 Weber State +^	7	–	1	11	–	3
Northern Arizona ^	6	–	2	7	–	5
No. 21 Eastern Washington	6	–	2	7	–	4
Sacramento State	6	–	2	7	–	4
Montana	5	–	3	7	–	4
Montana State	5	–	3	5	–	6
UC Davis	3	–	5	5	–	6
Idaho State	2	–	6	4	–	7
Northern Colorado	2	–	6	3	–	7
North Dakota	2	–	6	3	–	8
Cal Poly	1	–	7	1	–	10
Portland State	0	–	8	0	–	11
$ – Conference champion; ^ – FCS playoff participant; Rankings from STATS Poll

2017 Big South Conference football standings
	Conf.			Overall
Team	W		L	W		L
No. 8 Kennesaw State $^	5	–	0	12	–	2
Monmouth ^	4	–	1	9	–	3
Charleston Southern	3	–	2	6	–	5
Liberty *	2	–	3	6	–	5
Presbyterian	1	–	4	4	–	7
Gardner–Webb	0	–	5	1	–	10
$ – Conference champion; ^ – FCS playoff participant; * Liberty ineligible for postseason due to FBS transition; Rankings from STATS Poll

2017 Colonial Athletic Association football standings
	Conf.			Overall
Team	W		L	W		L
No. 2 James Madison $^	8	–	0	14	–	1
No. 11 Stony Brook ^	7	–	1	10	–	3
No. 20 Elon ^	6	–	2	8	–	4
No. 12 New Hampshire ^	5	–	3	9	–	5
Delaware	5	–	3	7	–	4
Richmond	4	–	4	6	–	5
Towson	3	–	5	5	–	6
Villanova	3	–	5	5	–	6
Maine	3	–	5	4	–	6
Albany	2	–	6	4	–	7
Rhode Island	2	–	6	3	–	8
William & Mary	0	–	8	2	–	9
$ – Conference champion; ^ – FCS playoff participant; Rankings from STATS Poll

2017 Ivy League football standings
	Conf.			Overall
Team	W		L	W		L
No. 24 Yale $	6	–	1	9	–	1
Columbia	5	–	2	8	–	2
Dartmouth	5	–	2	8	–	2
Penn	4	–	3	6	–	4
Harvard	3	–	4	5	–	5
Cornell	3	–	4	3	–	7
Princeton	2	–	5	5	–	5
Brown	0	–	7	2	–	8
$ – Conference champion; Rankings from STATS Poll

2017 Mid-Eastern Athletic Conference football standings
	Conf.			Overall
Team	W		L	W		L
No. 7 North Carolina A&T $	8	–	0	12	–	0
Howard	6	–	2	7	–	4
Bethune–Cookman	6	–	2	7	–	4
North Carolina Central	5	–	3	7	–	4
Hampton	5	–	3	6	–	5
Norfolk State	4	–	4	4	–	7
Savannah State *	3	–	5	3	–	8
South Carolina State	2	–	6	3	–	7
Florida A&M *	2	–	6	3	–	8
Delaware State	2	–	6	2	–	9
Morgan State *	1	–	7	1	–	10
$ – Conference champion; * Florida A&M, Morgan State and Savannah State ineligible for postseason due to APR violations; Rankings from STATS Poll

2017 Missouri Valley Football Conference standings
	Conf.			Overall
Team	W		L	W		L
No. 1 North Dakota State $^	7	–	1	14	–	1
No. 3 South Dakota State ^	6	–	2	11	–	3
No. 19 Northern Iowa ^	6	–	2	8	–	5
No. 13 Western Illinois ^	5	–	3	8	–	4
No. 15 South Dakota ^	4	–	4	8	–	5
Illinois State	4	–	4	6	–	5
Youngstown State	4	–	4	6	–	5
Southern Illinois	2	–	6	4	–	7
Missouri State	2	–	6	3	–	8
Indiana State	0	–	8	0	–	11
$ – Conference champion; ^ – FCS playoff participant; Rankings from STATS Poll

2017 Northeast Conference football standings
	Conf.			Overall
Team	W		L	W		L
Central Connecticut $^	6	–	0	8	–	3
Duquesne	4	–	2	7	–	4
Bryant	4	–	2	6	–	5
Saint Francis (PA)	3	–	3	5	–	6
Sacred Heart	2	–	4	4	–	7
Wagner	2	–	4	4	–	7
Robert Morris	0	–	6	2	–	9
$ – Conference champion; ^ – FCS playoff participant

2017 Ohio Valley Conference football standings
	Conf.			Overall
Team	W		L	W		L
No. 9 Jacksonville State $^	8	–	0	10	–	2
Austin Peay	7	–	1	8	–	4
Eastern Illinois	5	–	3	6	–	5
UT Martin	4	–	4	6	–	5
Eastern Kentucky	3	–	5	4	–	7
Southeast Missouri State	3	–	5	3	–	8
Tennessee State	2	–	5	6	–	5
Murray State	2	–	5	3	–	8
Tennessee Tech	1	–	7	1	–	10
$ – Conference champion; ^ – FCS playoff participant; Rankings from STATS Poll

2017 Patriot League football standings
	Conf.			Overall
Team	W		L	W		L
Colgate +	5	–	1	7	–	4
Lehigh +^	5	–	1	5	–	7
Holy Cross	3	–	3	4	–	7
Fordham	3	–	3	4	–	7
Lafayette	3	–	3	3	–	8
Bucknell	2	–	4	5	–	6
Georgetown	0	–	6	1	–	10
+ – Conference co-champions; ^ – FCS playoff participant

2017 Pioneer Football League standings
	Conf.			Overall
Team	W		L	W		L
No. 23 San Diego $^	8	–	0	10	–	3
Drake	6	–	2	7	–	4
Jacksonville	5	–	3	7	–	4
Campbell	5	–	3	6	–	5
Valparaiso	5	–	3	6	–	5
Butler	4	–	4	6	–	5
Dayton	4	–	4	5	–	6
Marist	3	–	5	4	–	7
Morehead State	3	–	5	4	–	7
Stetson	1	–	7	2	–	9
Davidson	0	–	8	2	–	9
$ – Conference champion; ^ – FCS playoff participant; Rankings from STATS Poll

2017 Southern Conference football standings
	Conf.			Overall
Team	W		L	W		L
No. 6 Wofford $^	7	–	1	10	–	3
No. 18 Samford ^	6	–	2	8	–	4
No. 19 Furman ^	6	–	2	8	–	5
Western Carolina	5	–	3	7	–	5
Mercer	4	–	4	5	–	6
The Citadel	3	–	5	5	–	6
Chattanooga	3	–	5	3	–	8
East Tennessee State	2	–	6	4	–	7
VMI	0	–	8	0	–	11
$ – Conference champion; ^ – FCS playoff participant; Rankings from STATS Poll

2017 Southland Conference football standings
	Conf.			Overall
Team	W		L	W		L
No. 10 Central Arkansas $^	9	–	0	10	–	2
No. 4 Sam Houston State ^	8	–	1	12	–	2
No. 25 Nicholls State ^	7	–	2	8	–	4
No. 22 McNeese State	7	–	2	9	–	2
Southeastern Louisiana	6	–	3	6	–	5
Northwestern State	4	–	5	4	–	7
Stephen F. Austin	4	–	5	4	–	7
Abilene Christian	2	–	7	2	–	9
Incarnate Word	1	–	7	1	–	10
Lamar	1	–	8	2	–	9
Houston Baptist	0	–	9	1	–	10
$ – Conference champion; ^ – FCS playoff participant; Rankings from STATS poll

2017 Southwestern Athletic Conference football standings
	Conf.			Overall
Team	W		L	W		L
East Division
Alcorn State xy	5	–	2	7	–	5
Alabama State	4	–	3	5	–	6
Alabama A&M	3	–	4	4	–	7
Jackson State	3	–	4	3	–	8
Mississippi Valley State	1	–	6	2	–	9
West Division
No. 16 Grambling State xy$	7	–	0	11	–	2
Southern	5	–	2	7	–	4
Prairie View A&M	4	–	3	6	–	5
Texas Southern	2	–	5	2	–	9
Arkansas–Pine Bluff	1	–	6	2	–	9
Championship: Grambling State 40, Alcorn State 32
$ – Conference champion; x – Division champion/co-champions; y – Championship game participant; Rankings from STATS Poll

== Conference summaries ==
=== Championship games ===
Conference	Champion	Runner-up	Score	Offensive Player of the Year	Defensive Player of the Year	Coach of the Year
SWAC	Grambling State; 11–1 (8–0)	Alcorn State; 7–5 (5–2)	40–32	Devante Kincade (Grambling State)	De’Arius Christmas (Grambling State)	Broderick Fobbs (Grambling State)

=== Other conference winners ===
Note: Records are regular-season only, and do not include playoff games.

Conference	Champion	Record	Offensive Player of the Year	Defensive Player of the Year	Coach of the Year
Big Sky	Southern Utah; Weber State	9–2 (7–1); 9–2 (7–1)	Keelan Doss (UC Davis)	Taron Johnson (Weber State)	Demario Warren (Southern Utah)
Big South	Kennesaw State	10–1 (5–0)	Chandler Burks (Kennesaw State)	Anthony Ellis (Charleston Southern)	Brian Bohannon (Kennesaw State)
CAA	James Madison	11–0 (8–0)	Kyle Lauletta (Richmond)	Andrew Ankrah (James Madison)	Curt Cignetti (Elon)
Ivy	Yale	9–1 (6–1)	Chad Kanoff (Princeton)	Matthew Oplinger (Yale)	Al Bagnoli (Columbia)
MEAC	North Carolina A&T	11–0 (8–0)	Lamar Raynard (North Carolina A&T)	Shaquille Leonard (South Carolina State)	Rod Broadway (North Carolina A&T)
MVFC	North Dakota State	10–1 (7–1)	Chris Streveler (South Dakota)	Brett Taylor (Western Illinois)	Chris Klieman (North Dakota State)
NEC	Central Connecticut	8–3 (6–0)	Tommy Stuart (Duquesne)	Tom Costigan (Bryant)	Peter Rossomando (Central Connecticut)
OVC	Jacksonville State	10–1 (8–0)	Roc Thomas (Jacksonville State)	Darius Jackson (Jacksonville State)	Will Healy (Austin Peay)
Patriot	Colgate; Lehigh	7–4 (5–1); 5–6 (5–1)	Dom Bragalone (Lehigh)	Abdullah Anderson (Bucknell)	Dan Hunt (Colgate)
Pioneer	San Diego	9–2 (8–0)	Anthony Lawrence (San Diego)	Jonathan Petersen (San Diego)	Dave Cecchini (Valparaiso)
Southern	Wofford	9–2 (7–1)	Devlin Hodges (Samford)	Ahmad Gooden (Samford)	Clay Hendrix (Furman)
Southland	Central Arkansas	10–1 (9–0)	Hayden Hildebrand (Central Arkansas)	George Odum (Central Arkansas)	Steve Campbell (Central Arkansas)

== Playoff qualifiers ==
=== Automatic berths for conference champions ===
Conference	Team	Appearance	Last bid	Result
Big Sky Conference	Southern Utah	3rd	2015	First Round (L – Sam Houston State)
Big South Conference	Kennesaw State	1st	–	
Colonial Athletic Association	James Madison	14th	2016	National Champions (W – Youngstown State)
Missouri Valley Football Conference	North Dakota State	8th	2016	Semifinals (L – James Madison)
Northeast Conference	Central Connecticut	1st	–	
Ohio Valley Conference	Jacksonville State	8th	2016	Second Round (L – Youngstown State)
Patriot League	Lehigh	11th	2016	First Round (L – New Hampshire)
Pioneer Football League	San Diego	3rd	2016	Second Round (L – North Dakota State)
Southern Conference	Wofford	8th	2016	Quarterfinals (L – Youngstown State)
Southland Conference	Central Arkansas	4th	2016	Second Round (L – Eastern Washington)

=== At large qualifiers ===
Conference	Team	Appearance	Last bid	Result
Big Sky Conference	Northern Arizona	6th	2013	First Round (L – South Dakota State)
Big Sky Conference	Weber State	6th	2016	First Round (L – Chattanooga)
Big South Conference	Monmouth	1st	–	
Colonial Athletic Association	Elon	2nd	2009	First Round (L – Richmond)
Colonial Athletic Association	New Hampshire	16th	2016	Second Round (L – James Madison)
Colonial Athletic Association	Stony Brook	3rd	2012	Second Round (L – Montana State)
Missouri Valley Football Conference	Northern Iowa	19th	2015	Quarterfinals (L – North Dakota State)
Missouri Valley Football Conference	South Dakota	1st	–	
Missouri Valley Football Conference	South Dakota State	7th	2016	Quarterfinals (L – North Dakota State)
Missouri Valley Football Conference	Western Illinois	11th	2015	Second Round (L – Illinois State)
Southern Conference	Furman	17th	2013	Second Round (L – North Dakota State)
Southern Conference	Samford	5th	2016	First Round (L – Youngstown State)
Southland Conference	Nicholls State	4th	2005	First Round (L – Furman)
Southland Conference	Sam Houston State	11th	2016	Quarterfinals (L – James Madison)

=== Abstentions ===
- Ivy League – Yale
- Mid-Eastern Athletic Conference – North Carolina A&T
- Southwestern Athletic Conference – Grambling State

== Postseason ==
=== Bowl game ===
Game	Date/TV	Location	Home team	Away team	Score	Offensive MVP	Defensive MVP
Celebration Bowl	December 16; ABC	Mercedes-Benz Stadium; Atlanta, Georgia	North Carolina A&T	Grambling State	21–14	Marquell Cartwright (RB, North Carolina A&T)	Franklin McCain III (DB, North Carolina A&T)

=== NCAA Division I playoff bracket ===
First round November 25; Campus sites ESPN3
Stony Brook*	59
Lehigh	29
Weber State*	21
Western Illinois	19
New Hampshire*	14
Central Connecticut	0
Northern Iowa*	46
Monmouth	7
Northern Arizona*	10
San Diego	41
Elon*	27
Furman	28
Kennesaw State*	28
Samford	17
Nicholls State*	31
South Dakota	38

Second round December 2 Campus sites ESPN3
1	James Madison*	26
Stony Brook	7
8	Southern Utah*	13
Weber State	30
4	Central Arkansas*	15
New Hampshire	21
5	South Dakota State*	37
Northern Iowa	22
2	North Dakota State*	38
San Diego	3
7	Wofford*	28
Furman	10
3	Jacksonville State*	7
Kennesaw State	17
6	Sam Houston State*	54
South Dakota	42

Quarterfinals; December 8 and 9 Campus sites ESPN2, ESPN3
1	James Madison*	31
Weber State	28
New Hampshire	14
5	South Dakota State*	56
2	North Dakota State*	42
7	Wofford	10
Kennesaw State	27
6	Sam Houston State*	34

Semifinals; December 15 and 16; Campus sites ESPN2, ESPNU, ESPN3
1	James Madison*	51
5	South Dakota State	16
2	North Dakota State*	55
6	Sam Houston State	13

National Championship; January 6; 12:00 pm Toyota Stadium, Frisco, Texas; ESPN2
1	James Madison	13
2	North Dakota State	17

* Home team
Winner
All times in Eastern Standard Time (UTC−05:00)

== Kickoff games ==
- Guardian Credit Union FCS Kickoff (aka Montgomery Kickoff Classic)
  - Jacksonville State defeated Chattanooga 27–13 at the Cramton Bowl (Montgomery, Alabama) on August 26.
- Other Week Zero games:
  - FBS opponent BYU defeated Portland State 20–6 at home on August 26.
  - Colgate traveled to Cal Poly August 26, coming away as 20–14 winners.
  - Florida A&M hosted Texas Southern on August 26, winning 29–7.

== Awards and honors ==
=== Walter Payton Award ===
- The Walter Payton Award is given to the year's most outstanding offensive player. Finalists:
  - Jeremiah Briscoe (QB), Sam Houston State
  - Keelan Doss (WR), UC Davis
  - Chris Streveler (QB), South Dakota

=== Buck Buchanan Award ===
- The Buck Buchanan Award is given to the year's most outstanding defensive player. Finalists:
  - Andrew Ankrah (DE), James Madison
  - Darius Jackson (DE), Jacksonville State
  - Brett Taylor (LB), Western Illinois

=== Jerry Rice Award ===
- The Jerry Rice Award is given to the year's most outstanding freshman.
  - Winner: Bryson Armstrong (LB), Kennesaw State

=== Coaches ===
- AFCA Coach of the Year: Brian Bohannon, Kennesaw State
- Eddie Robinson Award: Will Healy, Austin Peay

== New stadiums ==
- East Tennessee State defeated Division II Limestone 31–10 in the opener for William B. Greene Jr. Stadium on September 2. The team had played its first two seasons since reinstating football at local high school venue Kermit Tipton Stadium.
- Abilene Christian opened Anthony Field at Wildcat Stadium on September 16 with a 24–3 win over Houston Baptist, following 57 seasons at Shotwell Stadium.

== Coaching changes ==
=== In-season ===
This is restricted to coaching changes that took place on or after May 1, 2017. For coaching changes that occurred earlier in 2017, see 2016 NCAA Division I FCS end-of-season coaching changes.

School	Outgoing coach	Date	Reason	Replacement
Alabama State	Brian Jenkins	October 6	Fired	Donald Hill-Eley (Note: Interim for remainder of season; interim tag removed on December 7, 2017.)
Holy Cross	Tom Gilmore	October 15	Fired	Brian Rock (interim)

=== End of season ===
School	Outgoing coach	Date	Reason	Replacement
Alabama A&M	James Spady	November 19	Fired	Connell Maynor
Arkansas–Pine Bluff	Monte Coleman	November 19	Resigned	Cedric Thomas
Central Arkansas	Steve Campbell	December 7	Hired as head coach by South Alabama	Nathan Brown
Davidson	Paul Nichols	November 27	Contract not renewed	Scott Abell
Delaware State	Kenny Carter	November 20	Fired	Rod Milstead
East Tennessee State	Carl Torbush	December 8	Retired	Randy Sanders
Florida A&M	Alex Wood	November 21	Contract not renewed	Willie Simmons
Fordham	Andrew Breiner	December 5	Hired as OC at Mississippi State	Joe Conlin
Hampton	Connell Maynor	November 20	Fired	Robert Prunty
Holy Cross	Brian Rock	December 20	Permanent replacement	Bob Chesney
Incarnate Word	Larry Kennan	November 27	Fired	Eric Morris
Mississippi Valley State	Rick Comegy	November 20	Contract not renewed	Vincent Dancy
Montana	Bob Stitt	November 20	Contract not renewed	Bobby Hauck
Morgan State	Fred Farrier	December 18	Fired	Ernest T. Jones (interim)
North Carolina A&T	Rod Broadway	January 8	Retired	Sam Washington
North Carolina Central	Jerry Mack	December 8	Hired as OC at Rice	Granville Eastman (interim)
Northwestern State	Jay Thomas	December 2	Resigned	Brad Laird
Prairie View A&M	Willie Simmons	December 8	Hired as head coach by Florida A&M	Eric Dooley
Robert Morris	John Banaszak	November 19	Retired	Bernard Clark
Southeastern Louisiana	Ron Roberts	January 19	Hired as DC by Louisiana	Frank Scelfo
Tennessee Tech	Marcus Satterfield	November 19	Fired	Dewayne Alexander
Western Illinois	Charlie Fisher	January 4	Hired as WR coach by Arizona State	Jared Elliott
Wofford	Mike Ayers	December 13	Retired	Josh Conklin

== Attendances ==
Top 30 teams by average home attendance:

#	Team	Home games	Total attendance	Average attendance
1	Montana Grizzlies	6	141,212	23,535
2	James Madison Dukes	9	195,514	21,724
3	Florida A&M Rattlers	4	76,190	19,048
4	Yale Bulldogs	5	94,699	18,940
5	Montana State Bobcats	6	111,702	18,617
6	Jacksonville State Gamecocks	6	110,328	18,388
7	North Dakota State Bison	9	164,996	18,333
8	Prairie View A&M Panthers	5	89,016	17,803
9	Delaware Fightin' Blue Hens	6	99,890	16,648
10	North Carolina A&T Aggies	5	78,486	15,697
11	Grambling State Tigers	4	59,699	14,925
12	Alabama State Hornets	6	87,689	14,615
13	Southern Jaguars	4	57,261	14,315
14	Youngstown State Penguins	6	85,220	14,203
15	Alcorn State Braves	6	83,078	13,846
16	Jackson State Tigers	5	68,780	13,756
17	Tennessee State Tigers	4	48,320	12,080
18	South Dakota State Jackrabbits	8	95,951	11,994
19	South Carolina State Bulldogs	5	59,414	11,883
20	Illinois State Redbirds	5	57,200	11,440
21	Stephen F. Austin Lumberjacks	5	56,881	11,376
22	New Hampshire Wildcats	6	66,141	11,024
23	Western Carolina Catamounts	5	52,735	10,547
24	Mercer Bears	5	52,725	10,545
25	Abilene Christian Wildcats	5	52,204	10,441
26	North Dakota Fighting Hawks	5	52,139	10,428
27	Harvard Crimson	5	52,055	10,411
28	Eastern Washington Eagles	5	50,617	10,123
29	McNeese Cowboys	5	49,695	9,939
30	Northern Iowa Panthers	6	58,175	9,696

== See also ==
- 2017 NCAA Division I FCS football rankings
- 2017 NCAA Division I FBS football season
- 2017 NCAA Division II football season
- 2017 NCAA Division III football season
- 2017 NAIA football season
