= 2017 Richmond Spiders football team =

American college football season

2017 Richmond Spiders football
- Conference: Colonial Athletic Association
- Record: 6–5 (4–4 CAA)
- Head coach: Russ Huesman (1st season)
- Offensive coordinator: Jeff Durden (1st season)
- Defensive coordinator: Adam Braithwaite (1st season)
- Home stadium: E. Claiborne Robins Stadium

2017 Colonial Athletic Association football standings
	Conf.			Overall
Team	W		L	W		L
No. 2 James Madison $^	8	–	0	14	–	1
No. 11 Stony Brook ^	7	–	1	10	–	3
No. 20 Elon ^	6	–	2	8	–	4
No. 12 New Hampshire ^	5	–	3	9	–	5
Delaware	5	–	3	7	–	4
Richmond	4	–	4	6	–	5
Towson	3	–	5	5	–	6
Villanova	3	–	5	5	–	6
Maine	3	–	5	4	–	6
Albany	2	–	6	4	–	7
Rhode Island	2	–	6	3	–	8
William & Mary	0	–	8	2	–	9
$ – Conference champion; ^ – FCS playoff participant; Rankings from STATS Poll

The 2017 Richmond Spiders football team represented the University of Richmond in the 2017 NCAA Division I FCS football season. They were led by first-year head coach Russ Huesman and played their home games at E. Claiborne Robins Stadium. The Spiders were a member of the Colonial Athletic Association. They finished the season 6–5, 4–4 in CAA play to finish in sixth place.

== Coaching change ==
Russ Huesman, who previously served as defensive coordinator for the Spiders from 2004–2008 including the Spiders' national championship year of 2008, returned to the program after serving as head coach at Chattanooga for eight seasons. He replaced Danny Rocco, who served as head coach of the Spiders for five seasons before taking the same position at Delaware.

== Schedule ==
Date	Time	Opponent	Rank	Site	TV	Result	Attendance
September 1 (Note: Game was originally scheduled for August 27, but postponed and relocated due to Hurricane Harvey.)	7:00 p.m.	at No. 3 Sam Houston State*	No. 7	McLane Stadium; Waco, TX	ESPN3	L 34–48	8,048
September 9	1:00 p.m.	at Colgate*	No. 9	Crown Field at Andy Kerr Stadium; Hamilton, NY	STADIUM	W 20–17	6,994
September 16	2:00 p.m.	Howard*	No. 8	Robins Stadium; Richmond, VA	CSN MA+	W 68–21	8,217
September 23	6:00 p.m.	Elon	No. 8	Robins Stadium; Richmond, VA	WTVR DT3	L 33–36	8,217
October 7	3:00 p.m.	No. 24 Albany	No. 14	Robins Stadium; Richmond, VA	NBCS WA+	W 41–38 ^{2OT}	8,217
October 14	4:00 p.m.	at Towson	No. 13	Johnny Unitas Stadium; Towson, MD	FSGO	W 23–3	5,768
October 21	3:30 p.m.	at Delaware	No. 11	Delaware Stadium; Newark, DE	CSL	L 35–42 ^{2OT}	15,710
October 28	3:00 p.m.	No. 22 Stony Brook^{†}	No. 19	Robins Stadium; Richmond, VA	CSL	L 24–27	8,217
November 4	1:00 p.m.	at No. 20 Villanova		Villanova Stadium; Villanova, PA	NNAA	W 22–0	3,508
November 11	3:30 p.m.	at No. 1 James Madison		Bridgeforth Stadium; Harrisonburg, VA (rivalry)	MASN2	L 13–20	24,586
November 18	3:00 p.m.	William & Mary		Robins Stadium; Richmond, VA (Capital Cup)	NBCS WA	W 27–20	8,057
*Non-conference game; ^{†}Homecoming; Rankings from STATS FCS Poll released prior to game Poll released prior to the game; All times are in Eastern time

- Source: Schedule

== Game summaries ==
=== At Sam Houston State ===
	1	2	3	4	Total
No. 7 Spiders	6	14	7	7	34
No. 3 Bearkats	6	35	7	0	48

=== At Colgate ===
	1	2	3	4	Total
No. 9 Spiders	0	7	0	13	20
Raiders	0	7	7	3	17

=== Howard ===
	1	2	3	4	Total
Bison	0	7	7	7	21
No. 8 Spiders	14	34	13	7	68

=== Elon ===
	1	2	3	4	Total
Phoenix	6	13	7	10	36
No. 8 Spiders	7	7	12	7	33

=== Albany ===
	1	2	3	4	OT	2OT	Total
No. 24 Great Danes	0	14	10	7	7	0	38
No. 14 Spiders	0	14	7	10	7	3	41

=== At Towson ===
	1	2	3	4	Total
No. 13 Spiders	7	10	0	6	23
Tigers	0	0	0	3	3

=== At Delaware ===
	1	2	3	4	OT	2OT	Total
No. 11 Spiders	7	7	14	0	7	0	35
Fightin' Blue Hens	14	7	0	7	7	7	42

=== Stony Brook ===
	1	2	3	4	Total
No. 22 Seawolves	7	10	3	7	27
No. 19 Spiders	7	3	7	7	24

=== At Villanova ===
	1	2	3	4	Total
Spiders	3	5	14	0	22
No. 20 Wildcats	0	0	0	0	0

=== At James Madison ===
	1	2	3	4	Total
Spiders	0	7	3	3	13
No. 1 Dukes	0	10	0	10	20

=== William & Mary ===
	1	2	3	4	Total
Tribe	0	3	14	3	20
Spiders	0	7	13	7	27

== Ranking movements ==
Ranking movements Legend: ██ Increase in ranking ██ Decrease in ranking — = Not ranked RV = Received votes т = Tied with team above or below
	Week													
Poll	Pre	1	2	3	4	5	6	7	8	9	10	11	12	Final
STATS FCS	7	9	8	8	16	14	13	11	19	RV	RV	RV	RV	RV
Coaches	7	9	6–T	6	15	14	13	10	17	RV	RV	RV	RV	—
