= 2017 North Carolina A&T Aggies football team =

American college football season

2017 North Carolina A&T Aggies football

Black college national champion MEAC champion Celebration Bowl champion

Celebration Bowl, W 21–14 vs. Grambling State
- Conference: Mid-Eastern Athletic Conference

Ranking
- STATS: No. 8
- FCS Coaches: No. 7
- Record: 12–0 (8–0 MEAC)
- Head coach: Rod Broadway (7th season)
- Offensive coordinator: Chip Hester (3rd season)
- Defensive coordinator: Sam Washington (7th season)
- Home stadium: Aggie Stadium

2017 Mid-Eastern Athletic Conference football standings
	Conf.			Overall
Team	W		L	W		L
No. 7 North Carolina A&T $	8	–	0	12	–	0
Howard	6	–	2	7	–	4
Bethune–Cookman	6	–	2	7	–	4
North Carolina Central	5	–	3	7	–	4
Hampton	5	–	3	6	–	5
Norfolk State	4	–	4	4	–	7
Savannah State *	3	–	5	3	–	8
South Carolina State	2	–	6	3	–	7
Florida A&M *	2	–	6	3	–	8
Delaware State	2	–	6	2	–	9
Morgan State *	1	–	7	1	–	10
$ – Conference champion; * Florida A&M, Morgan State and Savannah State ineligible for postseason due to APR violations; Rankings from STATS Poll

The 2017 North Carolina A&T Aggies football team represented North Carolina Agricultural and Technical State University in the 2017 NCAA Division I FCS football season. This season marked the 94th for the program, and the final season for head coach Rod Broadway, who retired at the season's end. The Aggies finished the season undefeated with a record of 12–0, 8–0 in MEAC play, capturing their ninth conference title. The Aggies also earned an invitation to the Celebration Bowl where they defeated Southwestern Athletic Conference champion Grambling, earning their fifth black college football national championship. The Aggies played their home games at Aggie Stadium and were members of the Mid-Eastern Athletic Conference (MEAC).

On January 8, 2018, head coach Rod Broadway announced his retirement. He finished at North Carolina A&T with a seven-year record of 57–22.

== Before the season ==
At the conclusion of the 2016 football season, the Aggies lost key players such as Running Back Tarik Cohen, Wide Receiver Denzel Keyes, Defensive End Angelo Keyes and Kicker Cody Jones.

=== Recruiting ===
Prior to National Signing Day in February 2017, five players enrolled for the spring semester in order to participate in spring practice. On National Signing Day, A&T signed 12 additional players out of high school that completed the 2017 recruiting class. Of the class, 10 players were from North Carolina, two players from Greensboro and six players offensive linemen.

College recruiting (2017)
Name	Hometown	School	Height	Weight	Commit date
Malik Blassingame; OL	Anderson, SC	Westside HS	6 ft 2 in (1.88 m)	330 lb (150 kg)	Feb 1, 2017
Malik Blassingame; OL	Recruit ratings: No ratings found				
Jalen Fowler; QB	Spartanburg, SC	Dorman HS	6 ft 3 in (1.91 m)	240 lb (110 kg)	Feb 1, 2017
Jalen Fowler; QB	Recruit ratings: No ratings found				
Macquel Hardy; OL	Philadelphia, PA	ASA Junior College	6 ft 3 in (1.91 m)	295 lb (134 kg)	Feb 1, 2017
Macquel Hardy; OL	Recruit ratings: No ratings found				
Devin Harrell; DL	Gastonia, NC	Hunter Huss HS	6 ft 2 in (1.88 m)	220 lb (100 kg)	Feb 1, 2017
Devin Harrell; DL	Recruit ratings: No ratings found				
Kyin Howard; LB	Greensboro, NC	Eastern Guilford HS	6 ft 0 in (1.83 m)	230 lb (100 kg)	Feb 1, 2017
Kyin Howard; LB	Recruit ratings: No ratings found				
Karfa Kaba; DL	Laurinburg, NC	Scotland County HS	6 ft 4 in (1.93 m)	250 lb (110 kg)	Feb 1, 2017
Karfa Kaba; DL	Recruit ratings: No ratings found				
Zach Leslie; FS	Lawndale, NC	Burns HS/Palmetto Prep	6 ft 4 in (1.93 m)	180 lb (82 kg)	Jan 3, 2017
Zach Leslie; FS	Recruit ratings: No ratings found				
Christian Marshall; OL	Columbus, OH	Jackson State University	6 ft 4 in (1.93 m)	295 lb (134 kg)	Feb 1, 2017
Christian Marshall; OL	Recruit ratings: No ratings found				
Amir McNeil; DB	Laurinburg, NC	Scotland County HS	5 ft 10 in (1.78 m)	165 lb (75 kg)	Feb 1, 2017
Amir McNeil; DB	Recruit ratings: No ratings found				
Noel Ruiz; K	Wilson, NC	Fike HS	6 ft 0 in (1.83 m)	165 lb (75 kg)	Feb 1, 2017
Noel Ruiz; K	Recruit ratings: No ratings found				
Jamari Smith; RB	Jacksonville, FL	University of South Carolina	5 ft 10 in (1.78 m)	210 lb (95 kg)	Feb 1, 2017
Jamari Smith; RB	Recruit ratings: No ratings found				
Dacquari Wilson; OL	Greensboro, NC	Dudley HS	6 ft 3 in (1.91 m)	285 lb (129 kg)	Feb 1, 2017
Dacquari Wilson; OL	Recruit ratings: No ratings found				
Overall recruit ranking:
Note: In many cases, Scout, Rivals, 247Sports, On3, and ESPN may conflict in their listings of height and weight.; In these cases, the average was taken. ESPN grades are on a 100-point scale.; Sources: "2016 Team Ranking". Rivals.com.

== Coaching staff ==
2017 North Carolina A&T Aggies coaching staff
Head coach: Head coach – Rod Broadway; Offensive coaches: Offensive coordinator/wide receivers – Chip Hester; Offensive line – Ronald Mattes; Quarterbacks – Chris Barnette; Running backs – Shawn Gibbs; Tight end/offensive graduate assistant – Matt Pawlowski; Defensive coaches: Defensive coordinator/defensive backs/associate head coach – Sam Washington; Defensive line – Courtney Coard; Inside linebackers – Thomas Howard; Outside linebackers – Terry Lantz; Defensive graduate assistant – Denzel Jones	Administrative staff: Athletic Director (A.D.) – Earl M. Hilton III; Administrative support associate for football – Zanetta Thompson

== Schedule ==
Date	Time	Opponent	Rank	Site	TV	Result	Attendance
September 2	6:00 pm	at Gardner–Webb*		Ernest W. Spangler Stadium; Boiling Springs, NC	BSN	W 45–3	7,015
September 9	6:00 pm	Mars Hill*		Aggie Stadium; Greensboro, NC	LTV	W 56–0	12,827
September 16	7:00 pm	at Charlotte*	No. 25	Jerry Richardson Stadium; Charlotte, NC	7C	W 35–31	18,651
September 23	7:00 pm	at Morgan State	No. 21	Hughes Stadium; Baltimore, MD	Facebook	W 49–17	7,437
September 30	6:00 pm	at South Carolina State	No. 17	Oliver C. Dawson Stadium; Orangeburg, SC (rivalry)	FloFootball	W 21–7	14,789
October 7	1:00 pm	Delaware State^{†}	No. 16	Aggie Stadium; Greensboro, NC	LTV	W 44–3	21,500
October 14	3:00 pm	at Florida A&M	No. 15	Bragg Memorial Stadium; Tallahassee, FL	RV	W 31–20	25,067
October 21	1:00 p.m.	Bethune–Cookman	No. 12	Aggie Stadium; Greensboro, NC	ESPNU	W 24–20	13,262
November 4	1:00 pm	at Norfolk State	No. 9	William "Dick" Price Stadium; Norfolk, VA	SSC	W 35–7	6,082
November 11	1:00 pm	Savannah State	No. 9	Aggie Stadium; Greensboro, NC	LTV	W 36–17	9,397
November 18	1:00 pm	North Carolina Central	No. 8	Aggie Stadium; Greensboro, NC (rivalry)	ESPN3, ESPNU (tape delay)	W 24–10	21,500
December 16	12:00 pm	vs. No. 13 Grambling State*	No. 7	Mercedes-Benz Stadium; Atlanta, GA (Celebration Bowl)	ABC	W 21–14	25,873
*Non-conference game; ^{†}Homecoming; Rankings from STATS Poll released prior to the game; All times are in Eastern time

== Roster ==
2017 North Carolina A&T Aggies Roster (Source)
Wide receivers: 1 Jaquil Capel – Graduate Student; 3 Xavier Griffin – (redshirt) Senior; 8 Khris Gardin – Senior; 13 Elijah Bell – Sophomore; 16 Caleb Gabriel – (redshirt) Senior; 17 Isaiah Hicklin – (redshirt) Junior; 19 Zachary Leslie – (redshirt) Freshman; 80 Ahmed Bah – (redshirt) Freshman; 81 Ron Hunt – Freshman; 85 Terrence Peterson – (redshirt) Junior; 86 Deshaun McFadden – Sophomore; 88 Malik Wilson – (redshirt) Junior; 89 Rashad Bovian – Freshman; Offensive line: 58 Dacquari Wilson –Freshman; 61 Josh Mattocks – (redshirt) Senior; 62 Malik Johnson – Junior; 63 Macquel Hardy – Junior; 65 Daquan Blake – Senior; 66 Arlander Cherry – (redshirt) Sophomore; 68 Chamberlin Russell – Freshman; 69 Deven Milton – (redshirt) Freshman; 70 Brandon Parker – (redshirt) Senior; 71 Chris Davis – (redshirt) Sophomore; 72 Darriel Mack – (redshirt) Senior; 73 Marcus Pettiford – (redshirt) Sophomore; 74 Sylvester Smith – (redshirt) Sophomore; 75 Christian Marshall – Graduate Student; 76 Trajan Douthit – (redshirt) Freshman; 77 Bilal Ali – (redshirt) Freshman; 78 Micah Shaw – Junior; 79 Dontae Keys – Freshman; Tight ends: 84 Trey Scott – Graduate Student; 87 Leroy Hill – (redshirt) Junior; Fullbacks: 46 William Hollingsworth – Junior; 49 William Simpson – (redshirt) Sophomore	Quarterbacks: 7 Lamar Raynard – (redshirt) Junior; 10 Kylil Carter – Junior; 12 Jalen Fowler – Freshman; Running backs: 20 Jamari Smith – Graduate Student; 22 Marquell Cartwright – (redshirt) Junior; 23 Amos Williams – (redshirt) Junior; 25 Kashon Baker – Sophomore; 26 Samuel Stidwell IV – Junior; 36 Unique Johnson – Freshman; 37 Anthony McCray – Freshman; 39 Keifer Oates – (redshirt) Freshman; Fullbacks: 46 William Hollingsworth – Sophomore; 49 William Simpson – (redshirt) Sophomore; Defensive line: 50 Devin Harrell – Freshman; 82 Jarvis Reid – Sophomore; 90 Karfa Kaba – Freshman; 92 Jermaine Williams – (redshirt) Sophomore; 94 Justin Cates – Junior; 95 Julian McKnight – (redshirt) Junior; 97 Shomari Wallace – Freshman; 99 Artavious Richardson – Freshman; Defensive ends: 40 Darryl Johnson – (redshirt) Sophomore; 91 Kenneth "KJ" Melton – (redshirt) Senior; 93 Turner Echols – (redshirt) Junior; 96 Sam Blue – (redshirt) Junior; 98 Kadarius Kendrick – (redshirt) Freshman; Rovers: 2 Jamaal Darden – Senior; 30 David Pulliam – (redshirt) Senior	Linebackers: 4 Marcus Albert – (redshirt) Senior; 34 Deion Jones – (redshirt) Junior; 41 Leon "Tre" Smalls – (redshirt) Sophomore; 44 Julius Reynolds – (redshirt) Junior; 45 Joshua Patrick – Senior; 48 Jeremy Taylor – (redshirt) Senior; 52 Kiaundric Richardson – (redshirt) Junior; 53 Johnnie Brunson – Freshman; 54 Kyin Howard – Freshman; 56 Tyler Beck – (redshirt) Freshman; 57 Markeiss Blue – (redshirt) Junior; 58 Adrian McPherson – (redshirt) Sophomore; 59 Elijah Westbrook – (redshirt) Sophomore; Defensive backs: 5 Tard McCoy – (redshirt) Senior; 9 Zerius Lockhart – (redshirt) Senior; 14 Timadre Abram – (redshirt) Junior; 18 Richie Kittles – (redshirt) Sophomore; 21 Derrek Williams – (redshirt) Freshman; 24 Amir McNeil – Freshman; 27 Justin Philip – (redshirt) Freshman; 29 Mac McCain – (redshirt) Freshman; 32 Marquis Willis – (redshirt) Junior; 33 Jalen Bethea – (redshirt) Sophomore; 42 Taylor Wilson – (redshirt) Senior; 43 Najee Reams – (redshirt) Freshman; 47 Jaylen Pittman – Freshman; Punters: 15 Dominic Frescura – (redshirt) Senior; 60 James Mackey – (redshirt) Sophomore; 83 Garrett Nestor – Senior; Kickers: 35 Noel Ruiz – Freshman; 38 Davis Rogers – Freshman; Long snappers: 51 John Davis – Freshman; 67 Ernest (Petie) Bush III – (redshirt) Sophomore
† Starter at position * Injured; did not play in 2017.

== Game summaries ==
=== Gardner–Webb ===
Week One: North Carolina A&T vs. Gardner–Webb – Game Summary

Quarter	1	2	3	4	Total
Aggies	19	14	12	0	45
Runnin' Bulldogs	0	0	0	3	3

at Ernest W. Spangler Stadium, Boiling Springs, North Carolina

- Date: September 2, 2017
- Game time: 6:00pm EDT
- Game attendance: 7,015
- TV announcers (BSN): Fabian Fuentes and Alex Guest

Game information

First quarter

- NCAT – Marquell Cartwright 3 yard run (Noel Ruiz Kick), 11:33 (NCAT 7–0)
- NCAT – Lamar Raynard 8 Yd Run (Noel Ruiz PAT blocked), 04:25 (NCAT 13–0)
- NCAT – Malik Wilson 61 Yd pass from Lamar Raynard (Noel Ruiz PAT failed), 02:07 (NCAT 19–0)

Second quarter

- Elijah Bell 35 Yd pass from Lamar Raynard (L. Raynard Pass to E. Bell for Two-Point Conversion), 01:48 (NCAT 27–0)
- NCAT – Elijah Bell 8 Yd pass from Lamar Raynard (Two-Point Pass Conversion Failed), 05:54 (NCAT 33–0)

Third quarter

- NCAT – Jaquil Capel 1 Yd Run (Noel Ruiz PAT failed), 05:20 (NCAT 39–0)
- NCAT – Khris Gardin 88 Yd Punt Return (Noel Ruiz PAT blocked), 03:44 (NCAT 45–0)

Fourth quarter

- GWU – Paul Schumacher 25 Yd Field Goal, 08:35 (NCAT 45–3)

Top Passer

- Lamar Raynard (NCAT) – 19/22, 321 YDS 3 TD

Top Rusher

- Marquell Cartwright (NCAT) – 19 CAR, 58 YDS 1 TD

Top Receiver

- Jaquil Capel (NCAT) – 5 REC, 91 YDS 1 TD

This game marked the 1st ever meeting between the Aggies and In-State Division I FCS opponent Gardner–Webb. Going into the game, Gardner-Webb had a 10–4 record against MEAC competition. Junior Quarterback Lamar Raynard threw for 321 yards, 3 touchdowns and 19 of 21 completions. this marked the first time in his career that he threw over 300 yards in a single game. Junior Running Back Marquell Cartwright scored the first points of the game with a 3-yard run and finished with 19 carries for 58 yards. Other standouts include: Wide Receiver making 2 touchdown catches; receiver Jaquil Capel with 5 receptions, 91 yards and 1 touchdown and return specialist Khris Gardin who had 5 returns for 150 yards and set a new career best return of 88 yards. Gardner-Webb, who was selected to finish 3rd in the Big South preseason poll, were held to 114 yards of offense and 80 yards rushing.

=== Mars Hill ===
Week Two: Mars Hill vs. North Carolina A&T – Game Summary

Quarter	1	2	3	4	Total
Lions	0	0	0	0	0
Aggies	14	7	21	14	56

at Aggie Stadium, Greensboro, North Carolina

- Date: September 9, 2017
- Game time: 6:00pm EDT
- Game weather: 71 °F (22 °C), Partly Cloudy
- Game attendance: 12,827
- Referee: Rory Bernard
- TV: LTV

Game information

First quarter

- NCAT – Elijah Bell 3 yard pass from Lamar Raynard (Noel Ruiz Kick), 6:00 (NCAT 0–7)
- NCAT – Malik Wilson 53 Yd pass from Lamar Raynard (Noel Ruiz Kick), 00:32 (NCAT 0–14)

Second quarter

- NCAT – Jaquil Capel 66 Yd pass from Lamar Raynard (Noel Ruiz Kick), 09:44 (NCAT 0–21)
- NCAT – Elijah Bell 11 Yd pass from Lamar Raynard (Noel Ruiz Kick), 02:37 (NCAT 0–28)
- NCAT – Elijah Bell 22 Yd pass from Lamar Raynard (Noel Ruiz Kick), 00:03 (NCAT 0–35)

Third quarter

- NCAT – Julius Reynolds 6 Yd fumble recovery (Noel Ruiz Kick), 10:01 (NCAT 0–42)

Fourth quarter

- NCAT – Marquell Cartwright 5 Yd run (Noel Ruiz Kick), 14:54 (NCAT 0–49)
- NCAT – Kashon Baker 8 yd run (Noel Ruiz Kick), 03:50 (NCAT 0–56)

Top Passer

- Lamar Raynard (NCAT) – 17/25, 262 YDS 5 TD

Top Rusher

- Marquell Cartwright (NCAT) – 18 CAR, 123 YDS 1 TD

Top Receiver

- Elijah Bell (NCAT) – 6 REC, 60 YDS 3 TD

This game was the home opener for NC A&T and marked the 1st ever meeting between the Aggies and In-State Division II opponent Mars Hill. Going into the game, the Aggies held a 25–11 record against opponents in their home openers at Aggie Stadium. This game also marked the sixth time since 1980, that A&T faced a division II opponent from outside of the CIAA, another conference made up of predominantly HBCUs. Quarterback Lamar Reynard threw for 262 yards and 5 touchdowns matching a school record set in 1985 by Alan Hooker. Other standouts include: Junior Running Back Marquel Cartwright who ran for 121 yards on 8 carries and 1 touchdown; Wide Receiver Elijah Bell had 6 catches and 3 touchdowns; Senior safety Jeremy Taylor earned 10 tackles, forced one fumble, recovered one fumble and a returned interception for 32 yards. Mars Hill was held to only 7 yards rushing, but did gain 285 passing yards. This was the 40th time under coach Broadway that A&T held an opponent to under 100 yards rushing.

=== Charlotte ===
Week Three: No. 25 North Carolina A&T vs. Charlotte – Game Summary

Quarter	1	2	3	4	Total
No. 25 Aggies	14	7	7	7	35
49ers	7	3	7	14	31

at Jerry Richardson Stadium, Charlotte, North Carolina

- Date: September 16, 2017
- Game time: 6:00pm EDT
- Game weather: 83 °F (28 °C), Partly cloudy
- Game attendance: 18,651
- Referee: Jonathan Noli

Game information

First quarter

- CHAR – Hasaan Klugh 14 Yd Run (Nigel Macauley Kick), 13:26 (CHAR 0–7)
- NCAT – Malik Wilson 17 Yd pass from Lamar Raynard (Noel Ruiz Kick), 07:50 (TIE 7–7)
- NCAT – Jaquil Capel 1 Yd Run (Noel Ruiz Kick), 03:31 (NCAT 14–7)

Second quarter

- NCAT – Marquell Cartwright 9 Yd run (Noel Ruiz Kick), 14:25 (NCAT 21–7)
- CHAR – Nigel Macauley 22 Yd Field Goal, 08:14 (NCAT 21–10)

Third quarter

- NCAT – Marquell Cartwright 1 Yd Run (Noel Ruiz Kick), 09:33 (NCAT 28–10)
- CHAR – T.L. Ford II 29 Yd pass from Hasaan Klugh (Nigel Macauley Kick), 00:00 (NCAT 28–17)

Fourth quarter

- CHAR – R.J. Tyler 4 Yd pass from Hasaan Klugh (Hasaan Klugh Pass to Chris Montgomery for Two-Point Conversion), 06:12 (NCAT 28–25)
- NCAT – Mac McCain 74 Yd Interception Return (Noel Ruiz Kick), 00:24 (NCAT 35–25)
- CHAR – Workpeh Kofa 44 Yd pass from Hasaan Klugh (Nigel Macauley PAT failed), 00:08 (NCAT 35–31)

Top Passer

- Lamar Raynard (NCAT) – 16/26, 259 YDS 1 TD
- Hassan Klugh (CHAR) – 13/29, 170 YDS 3 TD 2INT

Top Rusher

- Marquell Cartwright (NCAT) – 17 CAR, 66YDS 2 TD
- Benny LeMay (CHAR) – 19 CAR, 158 YDS 1 TD

Top Receiver

- Malik Wilson (NCAT) – 2 REC, 84 YDS 1 TD
- Workpeh Kofa (CHAR) – 6 REC, 110 YDS 1 TD

This game marked the 1st ever meeting between the Aggies and In-State Division I FBS program Charlotte. Going into the game, Charlotte was 1–1 against MEAC competitors as they split a two-game series with North Carolina Central, A&T's arch rival. The standing room only crowd of 18,651 was a new attendance record for Charlotte's Richardson Stadium. It was expected that attendance for this match up of regional schools would be high as A&T has a large number of alumni in Charlotte and surrounding areas.

Freshman Defensive Back Mac McCain, had 2 interceptions including on in the final minute of the game where he ran 74 yards for a touchdown. Other stand out performances include Quarterback Lamar Raynard who completed 16 or 26 passes for a total 256 yards and 1 touchdown; 244 of those yards were before halftime. Also Junior defensive lineman Justin Cates had 3 sacks and 4 tackles for loss. The Aggies' win over Charlotte was the 2nd straight win the FCS program had over a higher tier Division-I FBS opponent, as they defeated Kent State, the previous season. This win also puts the Aggies at a 3–0 start to the season, a feat that has not been repeated since 2013.

=== Morgan State ===
Week Four: No. 21 North Carolina A&T vs. Morgan State – Game Summary

Quarter	1	2	3	4	Total
No. 21 Aggies	14	21	7	7	49
Bears	0	0	7	10	17

at Hughes Stadium, Baltimore, Maryland

- Date: September 23, 2017
- Game time: 7:00pm EDT
- Game weather: 88 °F (31 °C), Clear
- Game attendance: 7,437
- Referee: Rory Bernard

Game information

First quarter

- NCAT – Marquell Cartwright 72 yard run (Noel Ruiz Kick), 14:10 (NCAT 7–0)
- NCAT – Elijah Bell 15 Yd pass from Lamar Raynard (Noel Ruiz Kick), 09:27 (NCAT 14–0)

Second quarter

- NCAT – Jamari Smith 9 Yd pass from Lamar Raynard (Noel Ruiz Kick), 07:39 (NCAT 21–0)
- NCAT – Elijah Bell 31 Yd pass from Lamar Raynard (Noel Ruiz Kick), 01:29 (NCAT 27–0)
- NCAT – Mac McCain 100 Yd interception return (Noel Ruiz Kick), 00:00 (NCAT 35–0)

Third quarter

- MSU – Brian Gentry 83 Yd pass from Elijah Stanley (Luke Ursanel Kick), 13:58 (NCAT 35–7)
- NCAT – Jamari Smith 14 Yd Run (Noel Ruiz kick), 12:41 (NCAT 42–7)

Fourth quarter

- MSU – Luke Ursanel 40 Yd Field Goal, 14:40 (NCAT 42–10)
- MSU – Jai Franklin 41 Yd fumble recovery (Luke Ursanel Kick), 12:32 (NCAT 42–17)
- NCAT – Mac McCain 78 Yd interception return (Noel Ruiz Kick), 09:07 (NCAT 49–17)

Top Passer

- Lamar Raynard (NCAT) – 22/15, 158 YDS 3 TD
- Elijah Stanley (MSU) – 39/17, 303 YDS 1 TD 3 INT

Top Rusher

- Marquell Cartwright (NCAT) – 17 CAR, 158 YDS 3 TD
- Herb Walker Jr. (MSU) – 10 CAR, 31 YDS 0 TD

Top Receiver

- Elijah Bell (NCAT) – 4 REC, 95 YDS 2 TD
- Manassah Bailey (MSU) – 5 REC, 95 YDS 0 TD

This game marked the 83rd meeting between the Aggies and Morgan state. Morgan State holds the all-time lead in the series at 43–38–3. In their last meeting in 2014, the Aggies shut out the bears with a 45–0 win. Going into the game, the Bears were 0–3 and had been outscored 101–0 against opponents this season. The Aggies, who were ranked in both national FCS polls, were in pursuit of their first 4–0 start since the 1993 season.

The Aggies amassed 514 yards of total offense, with 169 yards passing and 345 rushing. Freshman Defensive Back Mac McCain earned 3 Interceptions, 2 of which for touchdowns, including a 100-yard interception from the bears endzone to put the Aggies up 35–0 at Halftime. In the game's second half, Morgan state scored their first points of both the game and season with an 83-yard pass from Elijah Stanley to Brian Gentry for a touchdown. In addition to McCain's performance, other standouts included: Quarterback Lamar Renard who threw for 169 yards and 3 touchdowns; Running Back Marquell Cartwright who ran for 176 yards and a touchdown and wide receiver Elijah Bell who had 4 receptions and 2 touchdowns.

=== South Carolina State ===
Week Five: No. 17 North Carolina A&T vs. South Carolina State – Game Summary

Quarter	1	2	3	4	Total
No. 17 Aggies	0	12	6	3	21
Bulldogs	0	0	0	7	7

at Oliver C. Dawson Stadium, Orangeburg, South Carolina

- Date: September 30, 2017
- Game time: 6:00pm EDT
- Game weather: 89 °F (32 °C), Fair
- Game attendance: 14,789
- Referee: Jason Soistham
- TV: FloFootball

Game information

First quarter

Second quarter

- NCAT – Noel Ruiz 36 yard field goal, 12:20 (NCAT 3–0)
- NCAT – Malik Wilson 17 Yd pass from Lamar Raynard (Noel Ruiz PAT failed), 07:12 (NCAT 9–0)
- NCAT – Noel Ruiz 41 yard field goal, 00:59 (NCAT 12–0)

Third quarter

- NCAT – Xavier Griffin 71 Yd pass from Lamar Raynard (Run for Two-Point Conversion), 03:45 (NCAT 18–0)

Fourth quarter

- SCSU – Trey Samuel 33 Yd pass from Dewann Ford (Tyler Scandrett Kick), 12:06 (NCAT 18–7)
- NCAT – Noel Ruiz 27 Yd Field Goal, 03:59 (NCAT 21–7)

Top Passer

- Lamar Raynard (NCAT) – 18/31, 298 YDS 2 TD 1 INT
- Dewann Ford (SCSU) – 13/30, 197 YDS 1 TD 1 INT

Top Rusher

- Marquell Cartwright (NCAT) – 24 CAR, 96 YDS
- Dewann Ford (SCSU) – 13 CAR, 52 YDS

Top Receiver

- Xavier Griffin (NCAT) – 1 REC, 71 YDS 1 TD
- Tra'Quan Dubose (SCSU) – 4 REC, 57 YDS

This game marked the 54th meeting between the Aggies and Bulldogs. The Bulldogs hold the lead in this rivalry with a record of 31–20–3. In their last meeting, in 2016, the Aggies defeated the Bulldogs 20–30 in Greensboro. Going into the game, the Aggies are on a 2-game winning streak against SC State. They entered an environment at Dawson Stadium in which they have only won 5 out of the last 21 games played there against the Bulldogs.

The Aggies ended the game with 425 Yards in total offense. Quarterback Lamar Raynard threw for 18 of 31 completions for 298 passing yards and 2 touchdowns. Raynard's streak of 159 passes without interception was broken by SC State's Graduate free safety Jason Baxter in the games' 3rd quarter. Other Aggie standout performances include: Running Back Marquell Cartwright who ran for 98 yards and a touchdown and Freshman Kicker Noel Ruiz who made 3 of 4 field goals from 36, 41 and 27 yards respectively. SC State were held to 279 yards of total offense, including 82 rushing yards. The bulldogs now have an 0–2 start in conference play for the first time in 16 seasons. The Aggies have now increased their streak against SC State to 3 games; a feat last completed in the 1998, 1999 and 2000 seasons.

=== Delaware State ===
Week Six: Delaware State vs. No. 16 North Carolina A&T – Game Summary

Quarter	1	2	3	4	Total
Hornets	0	3	0	0	3
No. 16 Aggies	16	14	7	7	44

at Aggie Stadium, Greensboro, NC

- Date: October 7, 2017
- Game time: 1:00pm EDT
- Game weather: 74 °F (23 °C), Cloudy
- Game attendance: 21,500
- TV: LTV

Game information

First quarter

- NCAT – Marquell Cartwright 2 yard run (Noel Ruiz Kick), 1:59 (NCAT 0–7)
- NCAT – TEAM safety, 1:43 (NCAT 0–9)
- NCAT – Marquell Cartwright 2 yard run (Noel Ruiz Kick), 1:24 (NCAT 0–16)

Second quarter

- DSU – Wisdom Nzidee 47 Yd Field Goal, 13:25 (NCAT 3–16)
- NCAT – Khris Gardin 12 Yd pass from Lamar Raynard (Noel Ruiz Kick), 07:09 (NCAT 3–23)
- NCAT – Xavier Griffin 10 Yd pass from Lamar Raynard (Noel Ruiz Kick), 03:10 (NCAT 3–30)

Third quarter

- NCAT – Elijah Bell 61 Yd pass from Lamar Raynard (Noel Ruiz Kick), 01:59 (NCAT 3–37)

Fourth quarter

- NCAT – Tray Scott 25 Yd pass from Kylil Carter (Noel Ruix Kick), 04:25 (NCAT 0–44)

Top Passer

- Lamar Raynard (NCAT) – 20/26, 324 YDS 3 TD

Top Rusher

- Marquell Cartwright (NCAT) – 19 CAR, 26 YDS 2 TD

Top Receiver

- Elijah Bell (NCAT) – 9 REC, 178 YDS 1 TD

This game marked the 46th meeting between the North Carolina A&T and Delaware State. Going into the game, A&T held a one-game lead in the all-time series with 23–22–1. In their last meeting, the Aggies defeated the Hornets 45–14 in Dover, Delaware. Quarterback Lamar Raynard completed 20 of 36 passes for 324 yards and 3 touchdowns in their homecoming victory. Other standouts include: Running Back Marquell Cartwright who recorded 96 yards rushing on 19 carries and two touchdowns; and sophomore Wide Receiver Elijah Bell who had nine catches for 178 yards and 1 touchdown. The Aggies held Delaware State to 128 total yards, including minus −38 yards rushing. The A&T defense recorded 8 sacks for 41 yards against the Hornets.

=== Florida A&M ===
Week Seven: No. 15 North Carolina A&T vs. Florida A&M – Game Summary

Quarter	1	2	3	4	Total
No. 15 Aggies	7	21	3	0	31
Rattlers	7	0	7	6	20

at Bragg Memorial Stadium, Tallahassee, Florida

- Date: October 14, 2017
- Game time: 3:00pm EDT
- Game weather: 86 °F (30 °C), Partly cloudy
- Game attendance: 25,067
- Referee: Eric Greene
- TV: LTV

Game information

First quarter

- NCAT – Marquell Cartwright 1 yard run (Noel Ruiz Kick), 09:15 (NCAT 7–0)
- FAMU – Devin Bowers 12 yard run (Kahlil Clark Kick), 06:26 (TIE 7–7)

Second quarter

- NCAT – Jamari Smith 61 yard pass from Lamar Raynard (Noel Ruiz Kick), 11:12 (NCAT 14–7)
- NCAT – Xavier Griffin 14 yard pass from Lamar Raynard (Noel Ruiz kick), 02:58 (NCAT 21–7)
- NCAT – Elijah Bell 4 yard pass from Lamar Raynard (Noel Ruiz kick), 0:34 (NCAT 28–7)

Third quarter

- FAMU – Devin Bowers 1 yard run (Kahlil Clark Kick), 13:47 (NCAT 28–14)
- NCAT – Noel Ruiz 22 yard field goal, 11:00 (NCAT 31–14)

Fourth quarter

- FAMU – Kareem Smith 38 yard pass from Ryan Stanley (Khalil Clark kick failed), 07:06 (NCAT 31–20)

Top Passer

- Lamar Raynard (NCAT) – 20/32, 215 YDS 3 TD 2 INT

Top Rusher

- Marquell Cartwright (NCAT) – 26 CAR, 84 YDS 1 TD

Top Receiver

- Trey Scott (NCAT) – 3 REC, 70 YDS

This game marked the 64th meeting between North Carolina A&T and Florida A&M. Going into the game, Florida A&M held a 44–17–3 all-time record against the Aggies, with the A&T winning the last meeting 42–17 the year before in Greensboro.

Both teams were able to score on their first drives of the game, with A&T Running Back Marquell Cartwright and FAMUs Devin Bowers getting their respective teams onto the scoreboard. In the second quarter, the Aggies recorded 159 yards of offense, held the Rattlers to 29 yards and kept the ball 12 of the 15 minutes allotted in a quarter and scored 21 unanswered points extending their lead to 28–7 at halftime. FAMU were able to mount some offense, outscoring the Aggies 13–3 in the second half of the game, but were not able to overtake the Aggies. Quarterback Lamar Raynard recorded 215 yards in the air, completing 20 of 32 passes. He also threw for 3 touchdowns and 2 interceptions. Wide receiver Elijah Bell had 6 receptions for 53 yards and 1 touchdown. On the defensive end, Redshirt freshman Defensive end Najee Reams and fifth-year safety Jeremy Taylor led the team. Reams finished with eight tackles and Taylor had five tackles, an interception and a pass break up. The Aggie's win was their seventh straight of the season, making them the third team in school history to start 7–0 since the 1927 and 1943 seasons.

=== Bethune-Cookman ===
Week Eight: Bethune-Cookman vs. No. 12 North Carolina A&T – Game Summary

Quarter	1	2	3	4	Total
Wildcats	3	10	7	0	20
No. 12 Aggies	7	7	0	10	24

at Aggie Stadium, Greensboro, NC

- Date: October 21, 2017
- Game time: 1:00pm EDT
- Game weather: 74 °F (23 °C), Partly Cloudy
- Game attendance: 13,262
- Referee: Jason Stoistman
- TV: ESPN3/ESPNU

Game information

First quarter

- BCU – Uriel Hernandez 33 Yd Field Goal, 10:30 (BCU 3–0)
- NCAT – Jaquil Capel 62 Yd pass from Lamar Raynard (Noel Ruiz Kick), 01:04 (NCAT 3–7)

Second quarter

- BCU – Uriel Hernandez 31 Yd Field Goal, 12:10 (NCAT 6–7)
- BCU – Frank Brown 30 Yd pass from Larry Brihm Jr. (Uriel Hernandez Kick), 08:37 (BCU 13–7)
- NCAT – Xavier Griffin 45 Yd pass from Lamar Raynard (Noel Ruiz Kick), 05:29 (NCAT 13–14)

Third quarter

- BCU – Larry Brihm Jr. 1 Yd Run (Uriel Hernandez Kick), 08:47 (BCU 20–14)

Fourth quarter

- NCAT – Noel Ruiz 30 Yd Field Goal, 13:05 (BCU 20–17)
- NCAT – Trey Scott 4 Yd pass from Lamar Raynard (Noel Ruiz Kick), 08:26 (NCAT 20–24)

Top Passer

- Lamar Raynard (NCAT) – 11/25, 177 YDS 3 TD

Top Rusher

- Marquell Cartwright (NCAT) – 20 CAR, 91 YDS

Top Receiver

- Jaquil Capel (NCAT) – 1 REC, 62 YDS 1 TD

This game marked the 38th meeting between North Carolina A&T and Bethune-Cookman. Going into the game, Bethune-Cookman held a 22–15 all-time record against the Aggies, with the A&T winning the last meeting 52–35 the year before in Daytona Beach.

In the first quarter, both teams were able to make scoring plays, with Bethune-Cookman kicker Uriel Hernandez completing a 33 Yd Field Goal for the first points of the game. The Aggies responded with a 62-yard pass from Lamar Raynard to Jaquil Capel for a touchdown. The Aggies went into halftime with a 1-point lead over the Wildcats. In the 3rd quarter, the Wildcats scored, shifting the momentum in Bethune-Cookman's favor as they closed the quarter leading the Aggies 20–14. With under five minutes left in the quarter, BCU quarterback Akevious Williams attempts however in an attempt for an interception, the ball bounces off Mckain's hands and into the hands of fifth-year linebacker Jeremy Taylor. Taylor is then stripped by BCU's Anthony Cruz, however, A&T junior linebackers Deion Jones was able to regain possession for the Aggies on the Wildcats 43-yard line. In the fourth quarter, the Aggies went on a 10-play drive resulting in a 30-yard field goal that brought them within 3 points of the Wildcats. A&T's defense then forced B-CU to a three-and-out that resulted in a punt out of bounds by the Wildcats on A&T's 48-yard line. With possession of the ball, A&T made a four-play drive resulting in a four-yard pass from Lamar Raynard to fifth-year tight end Trey Scott, putting the Aggies back in the lead 24–20. A&T's defense forced another three-and-out drive for Bethune-Cookman with the Wildcats ending the game on an incomplete pass.

The Aggies recorded 307 total yards, with quarterback Lamar Raynard accounting for 177 of them on 11 passes. Raynard's performance made him the fifth Aggie quarterback to throw for over 2,000 yards in a single season. The team's win has placed them as only 1 of 2 teams in the program's history to have an 8–0 record, the other being the 1927 team that won the school's first championship.

=== Norfolk State ===
Week Nine: No. 9 North Carolina A&T vs. Norfolk State – Game Summary

Quarter	1	2	3	4	Total
No. 9 Aggies	7	7	14	7	35
Spartans	0	7	0	0	7

at Dick Price Stadium, Norfolk, Virginia

- Date: November 4, 2017
- Game time: 1:00pm EDT
- Game weather: 65 °F (18 °C), Cloudy
- Game attendance: 6,082
- Referee: Robert Frazer

Game information

First quarter

- NCAT – Lamar Raynard 1 yd Run (Noel Ruiz Kick), 06:25 (NCAT 7–0)

Second quarter

- NCAT – Jeremy Taylor 47 yd interception return (Noel Ruiz kick), 10:56 (NCAT 14–0)
- NSU – Isaiah Winstead 8 yd pass from Juwan Carter (Josh Nardone Kick), 03:09 (NCAT 14–7)

Third quarter

- NCAT – Lamar Raynard 1 yd Run (Noel Ruiz Kick), 09:46 (NCAT 21–7)
- NCAT – Marquell Cartwright 1 yd run (Noel ruiz Kick), 06:45 (NCAT 28–7)

Fourth quarter

- NCAT – Jamari Smith 1 yd run (Noel Ruiz Kick), 12:43 (NCAT 35–7)

Top Passer

- Lamar Raynard (NCAT) – 22/31, 277 YDS 1 TD 1 INT

Top Rusher

- Marquell Cartwright (NCAT) – 17 CAR, 107 YDS 1 TD

Top Receiver

- Elijah Bell (NCAT) – 7 REC, 114 YDS

This game marked the 40th meeting between North Carolina A&T and Norfolk State. Going into the game, the Aggies held a 29–11 all-time record against the Spartans, with A&T winning the last meeting 35–0 the year before in Greensboro.

The game began with the Aggies scoring the first 14 points of the game. The Spartans scored their first points of the game with an 8-yard pass to Isaiah Winstead. The spartan's touchdown was the first in 14 quarters against A&T. Going into Halftime, A&T lead the Spartans 14–7. In the second half, A&T took control with 21 unanswered points. In the 3rd quarter, the Aggies scored on two successful 1-yard TD runs one by quarterback Lamar Raynard and the other by running back Marquell Cartwright. In the fourth quarter, running back Jamari Smith scored the final points of the game with another 1 yard run.

A&T held Norfolk state to −4 rushing yards on 21 attempts, while the Aggies recorded 203 yards rushing and 497 total. Lamar Raynard threw for 277 yards on 31 attempts and ran for 13 rushing yards and scored 2 Touchdowns. Other stand out players include: Marquell Cartwright who recorded 104 rushing yards on 17 carries and 1 touchdown and receiver Elijah Bell who recorded 114 yards on 7 receptions. The team's win marked the first time in the program's history that a team has gone 9–0.

=== Savannah State ===
Week Ten: Savannah State vs. No. 9 North Carolina A&T – Game Summary

Quarter	1	2	3	4	Total
Tigers	0	3	7	7	17
No. 9 Aggies	7	6	13	10	36

at Aggie Stadium, Greensboro, North Carolina

- Date: November 11, 2017
- Game time: 1:00pm EDT
- Game weather: 42 °F (6 °C), Partly Cloudy
- Game attendance: 9,397
- Referee: A. Singleton
- TV: LTV

Game information

First quarter

- NCAT – Marquell Cartwright 1 yard run (Noel Ruiz Kick), 14:16 (NCAT 0–7)

Second quarter

- NCAT – Noel Ruiz 25 Yd Field Goal, 14:30 (NCAT 0–10)
- SSU – Giovanni Lugo 30 Yd Field Goal, 09:20 (NCAT 3–10)
- NCAT – Noel Ruiz 30 Yd Field Goal, 0:41 (NCAT 3–13)

Third quarter

- NCAT – Trey Scott 54 Yd pass from Lamar Raynard (Noel Ruiz PAT Failed), 13:34 (NCAT 3–19)
- SSU – D'vonn Gibbons 2 Yd run (Giocanni Lugo Kick), 11:39 (NCAT 10–19)
- NCAT – Marquell Cartwright 1 yard run (Noel Ruiz Kick), 08:28 (NCAT 10–26)

Fourth quarter

- NCAT – Noel Ruiz 30 Yd Field Goal, 0:41 (NCAT 3–29)
- NCAT – Elijah Bell 18 Yd pass from Lamar Raynard (Noel Ruiz PAT Failed), 03:31 (NCAT 3–36)
- SSU – Jaylen McCloud 13 Yd pass from D'Vonn Gibbons (Giovanni Lugo kick), 0:06 (NCAT 17–36)

Top Passer

- Lamar Raynard (NCAT) – 17/27, 252 YDS 2 TD

Top Rusher

- Marquell Cartwright (NCAT) – 27 CAR, 137 YDS 2 TD

Top Receiver

- Elijah Bell (NCAT) – 5 REC, 77 YDS 1 TD

This game marked the 3rd meeting between North Carolina A&T and Savannah State. Going into the game, the Aggies held a 2–0 all-time record against the Tigers, with A&T winning the last meeting in 2014 34–0 the year before in Savannah.

The Aggies scored the first points of the game with a 1-yard run for a touchdown early in the 1st quarter. Freshman kicker Noel Ruiz recorded 2 field goals in the 2nd quarter giving the Aggies a 13–3 lead at halftime. In the 3rd quarter, Raynard threw a touchdown pass to 5th year tight end Trey Scott and Savannah State responded with their first touchdown of the game with a 2-yard run from quarterback D'vonn Gibbons, bringing the score to 19–10. The Aggies finished the 3rd quarter with 1 yard run by Marquell Cartwright resulting in a touchdown. In the 4th quarter, the Aggies added 10 more points to their total between a Noel Ruiz field goal and an 18-yard pass to Elijah Bell for a touchdown. The Tigers scored the final points of the game with 13 yard pass from D'Vonn Gibbons to Jaylen McCloud in the final seconds of the game.

The Aggies recorded 443 total offensive yards, with 252 passing and 191 rushing yards. The defense was able to hold Savannah State to 261 yards of offense, and forced 4 turnovers. Quarterback Lamar Raynard recorded 252 yards passing completing 17 of 27 passes and 2 touchdowns. Other standout performances include: wide receiver Elijah Bell who led the receivers with five catches for 77 yards including an 18-yard touchdown in the fourth quarter to tie the school's single-season touchdown receptions record at 10; tight end Trey Scott who recorded 3 receptions for 78 yards and a touchdown; Kicker Noel Ruiz who was perfect on three field goal attempts from 25, 30 and 32-yards out and running back Marquell Cartwright, who rushed 127 total yards on 27 carries for two touchdowns to go over 1,000 yards rushing for the season. The win clinched a share of the MEAC championship for A&T, earning the school's 3rd conference title in the past 4 seasons and 9th overall.

=== North Carolina Central ===
Week Eleven: North Carolina Central vs. No. 8 North Carolina A&T – Game Summary

Quarter	1	2	3	4	Total
Eagles	0	3	7	0	10
No. 8 Aggies	0	7	14	3	24

at Aggie Stadium, Greensboro, North Carolina

- Date: November 18, 2017
- Game time: 1:00pm EDT
- Game attendance: 21,500
- TV announcers (ESPNU): Jay Walker, Eric Clemons

Game information

First quarter

Second quarter

- NCAT – Elijah Bell 13 Yd pass from Lamar Raynard (Noel Ruiz Kick), 06:01 (NCAT 0–7)
- NCCU – Aedan Johnson 52 Yd Field Goal, 00:00 (NCAT 3–7)

Third quarter

- NCAT – Marquell Cartwright 1 Yd Run (Noel Ruiz Kick), 11:27 (NCAT 3–14)
- NCAT – Marquell Cartwright 1 Yd run (Noel Ruiz Kick), 06:26 (NCAT 3–21)
- NCCU – Isaiah Totten 3 Yd run (Aedan Johnson Kick), 01:16 (NCAT 10–21)

Fourth quarter

- NCAT – Noel Ruiz 31 Yd Field Goal, 07:10 (NCAT 10–24)

Top Passer

- Lamar Raynard (NCAT) – 10/18, 153 YDS 1 TD

Top Rusher

- Jamari Smith (NCAT) – 14 CAR, 99 YDS

Top Receiver

- Elijah Bell (NCAT) – 4 REC, 82 YDS 1 TD

This game marked the 89th game in the rivalry between North Carolina A&T and In-state conference member North Carolina Central. Going into the game, the Aggies held a 49–34 all-time record against the Eagles. The Eagles have won the last 3 meetings between the two teams, which has decided both conference championships and had post season implications for both A&T and NCCU. In 2014, NCCU's victory secured them a share of the MEAC Championship, split among 5 teams, including A&T. In 2015, an Eagle victory helped split the MEAC Championship again with A&T, who went on to win the 2015 Celebration Bowl and in 2016, NCCU secured an outright championship sending them to compete in the 2016 Celebration Bowl, while the Aggies earned an at-large spot in the FCS playoffs.

Quarterback Lamar Raynard recorded a total 193 yards of Total offense, completing 10-of-18 passes for 153 yards and 40 yards rushing on 7 carries. Other stand out performances include: Running backs Marquell Cartwright and Jamari Smith and wide receiver Elijah Bell. Smith recorded 123 yards of total offense, including a season-high 99 yards rushing on 14 carries and 2 receptions for a combined 23 yards. Cartwright recorded 60 yards rushing on 20 carries for 2 consecutive touchdowns in the 3rd quarter. Bell, who recorded 82 yards on 4 receptions, broke the school's single-season touchdown receptions record, earning his 11th of the season and surpassing former teammate from the 2016 Season Denzel Keyes and Craig Thompson from the 1991 team. The Aggies win over arch-rival NCCU gave A&T its 11th win of the season and the team's 1st undefeated MEAC season in 18 years. This is the Aggies 9th MEAC conference championship and their first outright title in 14 years.

=== Grambling State – Celebration Bowl ===
2017 Celebration Bowl – Game Summary

Quarter	1	2	3	4	Total
No. 13 Tigers	0	7	0	7	14
No. 7 Aggies	0	7	7	7	21

at Mercedes-Benz Stadium, Atlanta, GA

- Date: Decemberber 16, 2017
- Game time: 12:00pm EDT
- Game weather: Played Indoors, Domed Stadium
- Game attendance: 25,873
- Referee: Jay Edwards (CUSA)
- TV announcers (ABC): Mark Neely, Jay Walker, & Tiffany Greene

Game information

First quarter

Second quarter

- NCAT – Marquell Cartwright 11-yard pass from Lamar Raynard (Noel Ruiz kick), 04:58 (NCAT 0–7)
- GRAM – Jordan Jones 2-yard pass from Devante Kincaide (Marc Orozco kick), 00:43 (TIE 7–7)

Third quarter

- NCAT – Marquell Cartwright 29-yard run (Noel Ruiz kick), 07:36 (NCAT 7–14)

Fourth quarter

- GRAM – Martez Carter 29-yard pass from Devante Kincaide (Marc Orozco kick), 14:16 (TIE 14–14)
- NCAT – Lamar Raynard 1 yard run (Noel Ruiz Kick), 00:38 (NCAT 14–21)

Top Passer

- Lamar Raynard (NCAT) – 23/43, 225 YDS 1 TD, 2 INT

Top Rusher

- Marquell Cartwright (NCAT) – 20 CAR, 110 YDS 1 TD

Top Receiver

- Elijah Bell (NCAT) – 10 REC, 95 YDS

This game marked the 3rd Celebration Bowl game, and only the 8th meeting between the A&T and Grambling from the Southwestern Athletic Conference (SWAC). The Aggies were invited to participate in the Celebration Bowl after winning the MEAC Championship with an 8–0 record. Grambling earned their bowl invite after defeating Alcorn State in the SWAC Championship game. Going into the matchup, Grambling holds a 4–3 all-time record over the Aggies. The last meeting between occurred during the 1997 Season in which the Aggies defeated Grambling 37–35.

Quarterback Lamar Raynard recorded a total 242 of total offense, completing 23-of-43 passes for 225 yards and 17 yards rushing on 8 carries. Raynard scored the game-winning touchdown with a 1-yard sneak with 38 seconds left in the game. Other standout performances include: running back Marquell cartwright, receiver Elijah Bell and cornerback Mac McCain. Cartwright and McCain were named offensive and defensive most valuable players. Cartwright recorded 110 yards rushing on 20 attempts and 54 receiving yards on 3 catches. Cartwright's efforts resulted in 2 Touchdowns for the Aggies. McCain recorded 4 tackles and a key second-half interception at the Grambling goal line. Bell led the receivers with 10 receptions, gaining 95 yards for the Aggies.

The win over Grambling gave A&T its 2nd Celebration Bowl win and the program's 5th HBCU National Championship overall. In the 7 seasons under coach Broadway, the Aggies have 59 wins compared to the 15 games total in the 7 seasons prior to Broadway taking over the program.

== Statistics ==
Considered by most the best team statistically in the program's history, the 2017 Aggie football team reached a number of historical benchmarks and set new records for the program. The team broke the program's record for wins and is the first team to finish their regular season undefeated in 74 years. The team's 12–0 record made them the first team in the history of the MEAC conference to finish the season undefeated. Performances from players such as Quarterback Lamar Raynard, offensive lineman Brandon Parker and return specialist Kris Gardin broke a number of records during the season. Raynard's 2017 performance saw him break the program's single-season records in yards passing with 2,707; completions with 186; touchdown passes with 26; touchdowns responsible for with 29 and total offense with 2,875 yards. Nationally, Raynard ranked 3rd in passing efficiency (171.6), 4th in yards per pass attempt (9.50) and 10th in passing yards per completion (14.55) and completion percentage (65.3). Brandon Parker's stingy defense at the left tackle position resulted in 0 sacks by his opponents. In addition to his 2017 performance, Parker never allowed a single sack in his entire career at A&T. Khris Gardin, who set the FCS single-season record in punt return yardage as a sophomore, finished his senior season with 29 returned punts for 371 yards and a touchdown, including an 88-yard punt return for touchdown in the season opener against Gardner-Webb.

=== Team ===
	Team	Opp
Scoring	400	138
Points per game	36.4	12.3
First downs	231	160
Rushing	90	57
Passing	127	85
Penalty	14	18
Total offense	4,725	2,765
Avg per play	6.6	4.2
Avg per game	429.5	251.4
Fumbles-Lost	7–5	21–10
Penalties-Yards	87–774	79–675
Avg per game	70.4	61.4

	Team	Opp
Punts-Yards	45-1606	68-2812
Avg per punt	35.7	41.4
Time of possession/Game	32:57	27:03
3rd down conversions	57/133	58/156
4th down conversions	8/13	7/14
Touchdowns scored	54	16
Field goals-Attempts-Long	9–12	8–9
PAT-Attempts	(45–51) 88%	(13–15) 87%
Attendance	78,486	79,041
Games/Avg per Game	5/15,697	6/13,174

==== Scores by quarter ====
	1	2	3	4	Total
Opponents	17	29	42	47	135
Aggies	105	137	90	68	400

=== Offense ===
==== Rushing ====
Name	GP	Att	Gain	Loss	Net	Avg	TD	Long	Avg/G
Marquell Cartwright	11	224	1112	32	1080	4.8	13	72	98.2
Jamari Smith	11	69	399	10	389	5.6	2	40	35.4
Lamar Raynard	11	51	222	54	168	3.3	3	20	15.3
Kylil Carter	6	21	93	8	85	4.0	0	19	14.2
Jaquil Capel	11	18	67	10	57	3.2	2	10	5.2
Isaiah Hicklin	3	8	43	4	39	4.9	0	15	13.0
Kashon Baker	4	10	39	0	39	3.9	1	11	9.8
Caleb Gabriel	9	2	28	0	28	14.0	0	28	3.1
Amos Williams	10	4	18	0	18	4.5	0	9	1.8
Khris Gardin	11	1	4	0	4	4.0	0	4	0.4
TEAM	8	5	0	15	−15	−3.0	0	0	−1.9
Total	11	413	2025	133	1892	4.6	21	72	172.0

==== Passing ====
Name	GP	Effic	Att-Cmp-Int	Pct	Yds	TD	Lng	Avg/G
Lamar Raynard	11	171.6	86–285–5	65.3	2707	26	71	246.1
Kylil Carter	6	161.6	4–8–0	50.0	67	1	25	11.2
Isaiah Hicklin	3	104.6	2–4–0	50.0	26	0	20	8.7
Jaquil Capel	11	238.6	2–2–0	100.0	33	0	25	3.0
Total	11	170.9	194–299–5	64.9	2833	27	71	257.5

==== Receiving ====
Name	GP	No.	Yds	Avg	TD	Long	Avg/G
Elijah Bell	11	54	858	15.9	11	61	78.0
Khris Gardin	11	30	319	10.6	1	29	29.0
Jamari Smith	11	25	277	11.1	2	45	25.2
Trey Scott	11	24	347	14.5	3	54	31.5
CAPEL, Jaquil	11	14	281	20.1	2	66	25.5
Ron Hunt	11	14	132	9.4	0	22	12.0
Malik Wilson	11	12	318	26.5	4	67	28.9
Xavier Griffin	7	6	154	25.7	4	71	22.0
Zachary Leslie	10	5	33	6.6	0	14	3.3
Lamar Raynard	11	2	41	20.5	0	25	3.7
Ahmed Bah	8	2	34	17.0	0	26	4.2
Leroy Hill	11	2	26	13.0	0	14	2.4
Caleb Gabriel	9	2	14	7.0	0	8	1.6
Marquel Cartwright	11	2	−1	−0.5	0	4	−0.1
Total	11	194	2833	14.6	27	71	257.5

=== Defense ===
Name	GP	Tackles				Sacks	Pass Defense		Interceptions				Fumbles		Blkd Kick
Name	GP	Solo	Ast	Total	TFL-Yds	No-Yds	BrUp	QBH	No.-Yds	Avg	TD	Long	Rcv-Yds	FF	Blkd Kick
Jeremy Taylor	11	46	19	65	7.5 – 14	0–0	8	0	5–133	26.6	1	47	1–0	3	0
Mac McCain	11	33	13	46	1.0 – 1	0–0	8	0	5–274	54.8	3	100	0–0	0	0
Deion Jones	11	26	17	43	2.5 – 8	1.0 – 7	3	1	1–3	3.0	0	3	1–9	1	0
Marcus Albert	11	24	16	40	10.0 – 32	1.0 – 3	2	1	0–0	.	.	.	0–0	1	0
Darryl Johnson	11	24	14	38	15.5 – 62	6.5 – 37	3	4	0–0	.	.	.	1–0	4	0
Kiaundric Richardson	11	19	11	30	2.0 – 2	0–0	2	1	1–19	19.0	0	19	0–0	0	0
Sam Blue	11	15	14	29	11.0- 50	6.5 – 41	1	4	0–0	.	.	.	1–0	0	0
Timadre Abram	11	19	9	28	1.5 – 5	0–0	8	0	0–0	.	.	.	0–0	0	0
Julius Reynolds	11	15	13	28	1.5 – 7	1.0 – 6	1	1	0–0	.	.	.	1–6	0	0
Jermaine Williams	11	16	9	25	6.0 – 34	4.0 – 29	0	1	0–0	.	.	.	0–0	1	0
Jamaal Darden	7	18	5	23	0	0	3	1	2 -23	11.5	0	23	0–0	0	0
Turner Echols	11	15	7	22	4.5 – 18	2.0 – 10	1	2	0–0	.	.	.	0–0	0	0
Kenneth Melton	8	17	4	21	10.5 – 57	5.5 – 42	0	3	0–0	.	.	.	1–0	1	0
Tard McCoy	9	12	8	20	1.0 – 1	0–0	2	2	0–0	.	.	.	0–0	1	0
Joshua Patrick	11	10	8	18	0–0	0–0	0	0	1–9	9.0	0	9	0–0	0	0
Najee Reams	10	9	9	18	0–0	0–0	0	0	0–0	.	.	.	0–0	0	0
Julian McKnight	6	7	10	17	4.5 – 13	1.5 – 8	2	1	0–0	.	.	.	0–0	1	0
Richie Kittles	11	7	8	15	1.0 – 3	0–0	0	0	1–17	17.0	0	17	1–0	1	0
Derrick Williams	11	9	4	13	0–0	0–0	1	0	0–0	.	.	.	0–0	1	0
Kadarius Kendrick	11	5	7	12	4.5 – 15	1.0 – 9	0	0	0–0	.	.	.	0–0	0	0
Justin Cates	7	7	5	12	4.0 – 23	3.0 – 20	0	0	0–0	.	.	.	0–0	0	0
Marques Willis	11	8	3	11	1.0 – 1	0–0	1	0	0–0	.	.	.	0–0	0	0
Shomari Wallace	10	9	1	10	3.0 – 17	2.0 – 14	0	2	0–0	.	.	.	0–0	0	0
Leon Smalls	9	6	3	9	1.0 – 1	0–0	1	2	0–0	.	.	.	0–0	0	0
Justin Phillip	5	7	2	9	0.5 – 0	0–0	1	0	0–0	.	.	.	0–0	0	0
Jalon Bethea	5	3	3	6	0–0	0–0	1	0	0–0	.	.	.	0–0	0	0
Markeiss Blue	4	3	3	6	0–0	0–0	1	0	1–0	.	.	.	0–0	0	0
Elijah Westbrook	7	2	2	4	0–0	0–0	0	0	0–0	.	.	.	0–0	0	0
Taylor Wilson	6	2	2	4	0–0	0–0	0	0	0–0	.	.	.	0–0	0	0
William Hollinsworth	10	1	3	4	0–0	0–0	0	0	0–0	.	.	.	0–0	0	0
John Davis	11	3	0	3	0–0	0–0	0	0	0–0	.	.	.	0–0	0	0
Amos Williams	10	1	1	2	0–0	0–0	0	0	0–0	.	.	.	1–0	0	0
Williams Simpson	10	2	0	2	0–0	0–0	0	0	0–0	.	.	.	0–0	0	0
Malik Wilson	10	2	0	2	0–0	0–0	0	0	0–0	.	.	.	0–0	0	0
Marquell Cartwright	10	2	0	2	0–0	0–0	0	0	0–0	.	.	.	0–0	0	0
Noel Ruiz	11	1	0	1	0–0	0–0	0	0	0–0	.	.	.	0–0	0	0
Davis Rogers	2	0	1	1	0–0	0–0	0	0	0–0	.	.	.	0–0	0	0
David Pulliam	6	1	0	1	0–0	0–0	0	0	0–0	.	.	.	0–0	0	0
Team	8	0	0	0	0–0	0–0	0	0	0–0	.	.	.	1–0	0	0
Total	11	406	234	640	94–364	35–226	49	24	16–478	29.9	4	100	10 -15	15	0

=== Special teams ===
Name	Punting								Kickoffs				
Name	No.	Yds	Avg	Long	TB	FC	I20	Blkd	No.	Yds	Avg	TB	OB
James Mackey	32	1,217	38.0	53	0	9	5	1					
Garrett Nestor	11	352	32.0	51	0	5	7	0					
TEAM	1	0	0	0	0	0	0	0					
Lamar Raynard	1	37	37.0	37	1	0	0	0					
Noel Ruiz									72	3,724	51.7	3	1
Total	45	1,606	35.7	53	1	14	12	1	72	3,724	51.7	3	1

Name	Punt returns					Kick returns				
Name	No.	Yds	Avg	TD	Long	No.	Yds	Avg	TD	Long
Khris Gardin	26	353	13.6	1	88	14	376	26.9	0	78
Jaquil Capel	21	170	8.1	0	26	1	17	17.0	0	17
Caleb Gabriel						2	28	14.0	0	17
Terrence Peterson						1	2	2.0	0	2
Amos Williams						1	7	7.0	0	7
Total	27	371	13.7	1	88	24	524	21.8	0	78

== Postseason ==
Following the victory over Grambling for the HBCU national championship, the team returned to Greensboro on the afternoon of December 17, greeted by a host of family, friends, and members of the local media. In recognition of the national championship and undefeated season, the team was sent out on a 5 stop victory tour to celebrate the historic accomplishment. On January, 15th, the team served as grand marshals of the Greensboro Martin Luther King Day parade. The following day, the team was recognized by the Greensboro City Council with a resolution honoring the season's accomplishments. On January 19, the team was invited to meet with the Governor of North Carolina, Roy Cooper, in a reception at the North Carolina Executive Mansion. At the reception, Governor Cooper signed a proclamation recognizing the team and was presented with a gift from the University by A&T's Chancellor Harold Martin. On January 27, the team was again recognized during halftime of the basketball game against arch rival North Carolina Central. Lastly, on January 30, the university held a pep rally inside Corbett Sports Center, celebrating the team and their accomplishments. On April 19, the team received their championship rings for winning both the MEAC and National Championships. The MEAC championship ring, which is silver in color, has the interlocked A&T lettering as the centerpiece of the ring. The HBCU national championship ring is gold with the Celebration Bowl trophy at its center.

=== Rod Broadway's retirement ===
As the season concluded, many media outlets speculated the Rod Broadway was contemplating retirement. It was reported by media sources that as of the end of the regular season, Broadway had yet to sit down with A&T's Athletic Director Earl Hilton & Chancellor Harold Martin to renew his contract. According to Brant Wilkerson-New of the Greensboro News & Record, when asked about the retirement rumors, Broadway responded by saying “We’re going to sit down and discuss the direction of the program and go from there...It’s in a pretty good place; We’ve taken some giants steps forward and still have a lot of room for improvement. That’s the goal, and we’re going to sit down and talk about all those things in January.” On January 8, Broadway held a press conference confirming that he is retiring from coaching. Athletic Director Earl Hilton also announced that assistant coach Washington has been named as Broadways's successor. According to sources within the A&T athletic department, Broadway will serve out the remainder of his contract as a special assistant to the Athletic Director.

=== Awards ===
In the weeks following the finale of the 2017 MEAC regular season, many organizations began to announce finalists and winners of various post-season awards and honors. Coach Rod Broadway, in addition to several players for the Aggies, were honored with postseason awards and accolades including Redshirt Junior quarterback Lamar Raynard and Senior Offensive Lineman Brandon Parker.

Coach Broadway was named MEAC Coach of the year for the first time his 7 seasons as head coach of the Aggie program. In addition to Broadway, Quarterback Lamar Raynard was named MEAC Offensive player of the year. Raynard was presented with the award at the 60th annual National Football Foundation & College Hall of Fame press conference in New York City. He is the first Aggie Quarterback to win the award since Connell Maynor, who won in 1991. Offensive lineman Brandon Parker earned the MEAC Offensive Lineman of the Year award, becoming the first player to win the award in 3 consecutive seasons. His performance also earned him 1st team FCS All-America honors and an invitation to the Senior Bowl where he was one of 3 players from a HBCU in attendance. In addition to Parker Freshman Defensive Back Mac McCain and Return Specialist Khris Gardin also earned FCS All-America honors, gaining third team recognition. Gardin ranks second in all of FCS with 1,594 punt return yards, behind Marquay McDaniel of Hampton University.

The following A&T players were also named to the All–MEAC First, Second, and Third Teams:

All-MEAC First Team
- Timadre Abram, Jr, DB
- Elijah Bell, So, WR
- Marquell Cartwright, Jr, RB
- Khris Gardin, Sr, RS
- Darryl Johnson, Jr., R-So, DB
- Darriel Mack, Sr, C
- Mac McCain, R-Fr, DB
- Brandon Parker, R-Sr, OL
- Marcus Pettiford, R-So, OL
- Lamar Raynard, R-Sr, QB
- Trey Scott, Gr, TE
- Jeremy Taylor, R-Sr, LB

All-MEAC Second Team

None Selected

All-MEAC Third Team
- Marcus Albert, Sr, LB

=== 2018 NFL draft ===
The 2018 NFL draft was held on April 26–28, 2018 at AT&T Stadium in Arlington, Texas. The following A&T players were either selected or signed as undrafted free agents following the draft.

Player	Position	Round	Overall pick	NFL team
Brandon Parker	OL	3rd	65th	Oakland Raiders

== Ranking movements ==
Ranking movements Legend: ██ Increase in ranking ██ Decrease in ranking RV = Received votes ( ) = First-place votes
	Week													
Poll	Pre	1	2	3	4	5	6	7	8	9	10	11	12	Final
STATS	RV	RV	25	21	17	16	15	12	7	9	9	8	7	7
Coaches	25	21	20	15	13	12	11	11	6	7	7	7	7	6 (1)
BoxToRow Media Poll and Coaches Poll (BTR)	3 (2)	1 (5)	1 (7)	1 (15)	1 (16)	1 (17)	1 (16)	1 (15)	1 (16)	1 (16)	1 (18)	1 (18)	1	1
