= 2017 Bethune–Cookman Wildcats football team =

American college football season

2017 Bethune–Cookman Wildcats football
- Conference: Mid-Eastern Athletic Conference
- Record: 7–4 (6–2 MEAC)
- Head coach: Terry Sims (3rd season)
- Offensive coordinator: Allen Suber
- Defensive coordinator: Charles Jones
- Home stadium: Municipal Stadium

2017 Mid-Eastern Athletic Conference football standings
| | Conf. | | | Overall |
| Team | W | | L | W | | L |
|---|---|---|---|---|---|---|
| No. 7 North Carolina A&T $ | 8 | – | 0 | 12 | – | 0 |
| Howard | 6 | – | 2 | 7 | – | 4 |
| Bethune–Cookman | 6 | – | 2 | 7 | – | 4 |
| North Carolina Central | 5 | – | 3 | 7 | – | 4 |
| Hampton | 5 | – | 3 | 6 | – | 5 |
| Norfolk State | 4 | – | 4 | 4 | – | 7 |
| Savannah State * | 3 | – | 5 | 3 | – | 8 |
| South Carolina State | 2 | – | 6 | 3 | – | 7 |
| Florida A&M * | 2 | – | 6 | 3 | – | 8 |
| Delaware State | 2 | – | 6 | 2 | – | 9 |
| Morgan State * | 1 | – | 7 | 1 | – | 10 |
$ – Conference champion; * Florida A&M, Morgan State and Savannah State ineligible for postseason due to APR violations; Rankings from STATS Poll

The 2017 Bethune–Cookman Wildcats football team represented Bethune–Cookman University in the 2017 NCAA Division I FCS football season. They were led by third-year head coach Terry Sims and played their home games at Municipal Stadium. They were a member of the Mid-Eastern Athletic Conference (MEAC). They finished the season 7–4, 6–2 in MEAC play to finish in a tie for second place.

== Schedule ==
| Date | Time | Opponent | Site | TV | Result | Attendance |
|---|---|---|---|---|---|---|
| September 2 | 12:30 p.m. | at No. 18 (FBS) Miami (FL)* | Hard Rock Stadium; Miami Gardens, FL | ACCRSN | L 13–41 | 50,484 |
| September 9 | 8:00 p.m. | at Southeastern Louisiana* | Strawberry Stadium; Hammond, LA | ELVN | W 28–23 | 6,321 |
| September 16 | 7:00 p.m. | at Florida Atlantic* | FAU Stadium; Boca Raton, FL | beIN | L 0–45 | 16,743 |
| September 23 | 1:00 p.m. | at Howard | William H. Greene Stadium; Washington, D.C. | WHBC | L 24–26 | 2,217 |
| September 30 | 4:00 p.m. | Savannah State | Municipal Stadium; Daytona Beach, FL | CEN | W 24–12 | 6,945 |
| October 14 | 4:00 p.m. | South Carolina State | Municipal Stadium; Daytona Beach, FL | CEN | W 12–9 | 6,191 |
| October 21 | 1:00 p.m. | at No. 12 North Carolina A&T | Aggie Stadium; Greensboro, NC | ESPNU | L 20–24 | 13,262 |
| October 28 | 4:00 p.m. | Hampton^{†} | Municipal Stadium; Daytona Beach, FL | | W 24–21 | 10,951 |
| November 4 | 4:00 p.m. | Morgan State | Municipal Stadium; Daytona Beach, FL | | W 41–28 | 5,261 |
| November 11 | 2:00 p.m. | at North Carolina Central | O'Kelly–Riddick Stadium; Durham, NC | ESPNU | W 13–10 | 5,769 |
| November 18 | 2:00 p.m. | vs. Florida A&M | Camping World Stadium; Orlando, FL (Florida Classic) | ESPNU | W 29–24 | 47,819 |
*Non-conference game; ^{†}Homecoming; Rankings from The Sports Network Poll released prior to the game; All times are in Eastern time

Source: Schedule

== Game summaries ==
=== At Miami (FL) ===
| | 1 | 2 | 3 | 4 | Total |
|---|---|---|---|---|---|
| Wildcats | 3 | 3 | 7 | 0 | 13 |
| No. 18 (FBS) Hurricanes | 3 | 21 | 14 | 3 | 41 |

=== At Southeastern Louisiana ===
| | 1 | 2 | 3 | 4 | Total |
|---|---|---|---|---|---|
| Wildcats | 14 | 0 | 0 | 14 | 28 |
| Lions | 3 | 6 | 7 | 7 | 23 |

=== At Florida Atlantic ===
| | 1 | 2 | 3 | 4 | Total |
|---|---|---|---|---|---|
| Wildcats | 0 | 0 | 0 | 0 | 0 |
| Owls | 14 | 7 | 17 | 7 | 45 |

=== At Howard ===
| | 1 | 2 | 3 | 4 | Total |
|---|---|---|---|---|---|
| Wildcats | 7 | 7 | 10 | 0 | 24 |
| Bison | 0 | 14 | 6 | 6 | 26 |

=== Savannah State ===
| | 1 | 2 | 3 | 4 | Total |
|---|---|---|---|---|---|
| Tigers | 0 | 2 | 3 | 7 | 12 |
| Wildcats | 7 | 3 | 7 | 7 | 24 |

=== South Carolina State ===
| | 1 | 2 | 3 | 4 | Total |
|---|---|---|---|---|---|
| Bulldogs | 0 | 9 | 0 | 0 | 9 |
| Wildcats | 3 | 6 | 0 | 3 | 12 |

=== At North Carolina A&T ===
| | 1 | 2 | 3 | 4 | Total |
|---|---|---|---|---|---|
| Wildcats | 3 | 10 | 7 | 0 | 20 |
| No. 12 Aggies | 7 | 7 | 0 | 10 | 24 |

=== Hampton ===
| | 1 | 2 | 3 | 4 | Total |
|---|---|---|---|---|---|
| Pirates | 7 | 0 | 14 | 0 | 21 |
| Wildcats | 14 | 3 | 0 | 7 | 24 |

=== Morgan State ===
| | 1 | 2 | 3 | 4 | Total |
|---|---|---|---|---|---|
| Bears | 0 | 14 | 14 | 0 | 28 |
| Wildcats | 7 | 13 | 21 | 0 | 41 |

=== At North Carolina Central ===
| | 1 | 2 | 3 | 4 | Total |
|---|---|---|---|---|---|
| Wildcats | 0 | 0 | 7 | 6 | 13 |
| Eagles | 0 | 0 | 0 | 10 | 10 |

=== vs Florida A&M ===
| | 1 | 2 | 3 | 4 | Total |
|---|---|---|---|---|---|
| Rattlers | 0 | 10 | 7 | 7 | 24 |
| Wildcats | 7 | 3 | 0 | 19 | 29 |
