= Fred Farrier =

American football player and coach (born 1972)

Frederick Farrier
Current position
- Annual salary: Unknown

Biographical details
- Born: May 9, 1972 (age 54)

Playing career
- 1990–1993: Holy Cross
- Position: Wide receiver

Coaching career (HC unless noted)
- 1998–1999: Michigan State (GA)
- 2001–2003: Tennessee Tech (WR/RC)
- 2004: Shaw (assoc. HC / OC)
- 2005–2008: Kentucky State
- 2012–2013: RPI (PGC)
- 2014–2015: Morgan State (OC/QB)
- 2016–2017: Morgan State
- 2018: South Carolina State (assoc. HC / WR)
- 2019–2023: Alabama A&M (RB/RC)
- February 2024– October 2025: Hazel Green HS (AL)

Head coaching record
- Overall: 23–43 (college); 3–7 (high school)

Frederick T. Farrier (born May 9, 1972) is an American football coach and former player. He served as head football coach at Hazel Green High School in Hazel Green, Alabama until October 2025. Farrier previously served as head football coach at Kentucky State University from 2005 to 2008 and at Morgan State University from 2016 to 2017.

Farrier played college football as a wide receiver at the College of the Holy Cross. He became the interim head coach at Morgan State on February 11, 2016, after their previous head coach, Lee Hull, accepted a position with the Indianapolis Colts in the National Football League (NFL). On December 9, 2016, Farrier was promoted from interim to full-time head coach.

== Head coaching record ==
=== College ===
Year	Team	Overall	Conference	Standing	Bowl/playoffs
Kentucky State Thorobreds (Southern Intercollegiate Athletic Conference) (2005–2008)
2005	Kentucky State	6–5	5–4	T–4th	
2006	Kentucky State	7–4	4–3	T–4th	
2007	Kentucky State	3–8	3–4	T–6th	
2008	Kentucky State	3–8	1–8	10th	
Kentucky State:		19–25	13–19		
Morgan State Bears (Mid-Eastern Athletic Conference) (2016–2017)
2016	Morgan State	3–8	3–5	T–7th	
2017	Morgan State	1–10	1–7	11th	
Morgan State:		4–18	4–12		
Total:		23–43			
