= 2017 Delaware State Hornets football team =

American college football season

2017 Delaware State Hornets football
- Conference: Mid-Eastern Athletic Conference
- Record: 2–9 (2–6 MEAC)
- Head coach: Kenny Carter (3rd season)
- Offensive coordinator: Vincent White (1st season)
- Defensive coordinator: Gerard Wilcher (2nd season)
- Home stadium: Alumni Stadium

2017 Mid-Eastern Athletic Conference football standings
	Conf.			Overall
Team	W		L	W		L
No. 7 North Carolina A&T $	8	–	0	12	–	0
Howard	6	–	2	7	–	4
Bethune–Cookman	6	–	2	7	–	4
North Carolina Central	5	–	3	7	–	4
Hampton	5	–	3	6	–	5
Norfolk State	4	–	4	4	–	7
Savannah State *	3	–	5	3	–	8
South Carolina State	2	–	6	3	–	7
Florida A&M *	2	–	6	3	–	8
Delaware State	2	–	6	2	–	9
Morgan State *	1	–	7	1	–	10
$ – Conference champion; * Florida A&M, Morgan State and Savannah State ineligible for postseason due to APR violations; Rankings from STATS Poll

The 2017 Delaware State Hornets football team represented Delaware State University as a member of the Mid-Eastern Athletic Conference (MEAC) in the 2017 NCAA Division I FCS football season. Led by Kenny Carter in third and final season as head coach, the Hornets compiled an overall record of 2–9 with a mark of 2–6 in conference play, placing in a three-way tie for eighth in the MEAC. Delaware State played home games at Alumni Stadium in Dover, Delaware.

On November 19, Delaware State was announced that Carter's contract would not be renewed. He finished his tenure at Delaware State with a three-year record of 3–30.

== Schedule ==
Date	Time	Opponent	Site	TV	Result	Attendance
August 31	7:00 p.m.	at Delaware*	Delaware Stadium; Newark, DE (Route 1 Rivalry)	BHAA	L 3–22	18,040
September 8	7:00 p.m.	at Hampton	Armstrong Stadium; Hampton, VA	PTV	L 15–28	6,456
September 16	12:00 p.m.	at West Virginia*	Mountaineer Field; Morgantown, WV	AT&T SportsNet Pitt.	L 16–59	51,482
September 23	2:00 p.m.	Norfolk State	Alumni Stadium; Dover, DE	DESU-TV	L 7–17	2,491
October 7	1:00 p.m.	at No. 16 North Carolina A&T	Aggie Stadium; Greensboro, NC	LTV	L 3–44	21,500
October 14	2:00 p.m.	Howard^{†}	Alumni Stadium; Dover, DE	WDSU-TV	L 23–52	3,337
October 21	2:00 p.m.	South Carolina State	Alumni Stadium; Dover, DE	WDSU-TV	W 17–14	1,270
October 28	2:00 p.m.	at North Carolina Central	O'Kelly–Riddick Stadium; Durham, NC		L 14–42	14,117
November 4	5:00 p.m.	at Savannah State	Ted Wright Stadium; Savannah, GA		L 21–35	2,371
November 11	2:00 p.m.	Morgan State	Alumni Stadium; Dover, DE	WDSU-TV	W 33–30	1,334
November 18	12:00 p.m.	at Florida State*	Doak Campbell Stadium; Tallahassee, FL	ACCN	L 6–77	70,599
*Non-conference game; ^{†}Homecoming; Rankings from STATS Poll released prior to the game; All times are in Eastern time

== Game summaries ==
=== At Delaware ===
	1	2	3	4	Total
Hornets	0	3	0	0	3
Fightin' Blue Hens	2	6	7	7	22

=== At Hampton ===
	1	2	3	4	Total
Hornets	5	10	0	0	15
Pirates	7	14	0	7	28

=== At West Virginia ===
	1	2	3	4	Total
Hornets	10	0	0	6	16
Mountaineers	24	21	7	7	59

=== Norfolk State ===
	1	2	3	4	Total
Spartans	0	3	7	7	17
Hornets	0	0	0	7	7

=== At North Carolina A&T ===
	1	2	3	4	Total
Hornets	0	3	0	0	3
No. 16 Aggies	16	14	7	7	44

=== Howard ===
	1	2	3	4	Total
Bison	10	7	21	14	52
Hornets	0	10	7	6	23

=== South Carolina State ===
	1	2	3	4	Total
Bulldogs	0	7	0	7	14
Hornets	14	0	0	3	17

=== At North Carolina Central ===
	1	2	3	4	Total
Hornets	0	7	7	0	14
Eagles	14	14	7	7	42

=== At Savannah State ===
	1	2	3	4	Total
Hornets	0	7	7	7	21
Tigers	14	7	7	7	35

=== Morgan State ===
	1	2	3	4	Total
Bears	14	9	0	7	30
Hornets	0	13	10	10	33

=== At Florida State ===
	1	2	3	4	Total
Hornets	6	0	0	0	6
Seminoles	21	35	7	14	77
