= Kenny Carter (American football) =

American football player and coach (born 1967)

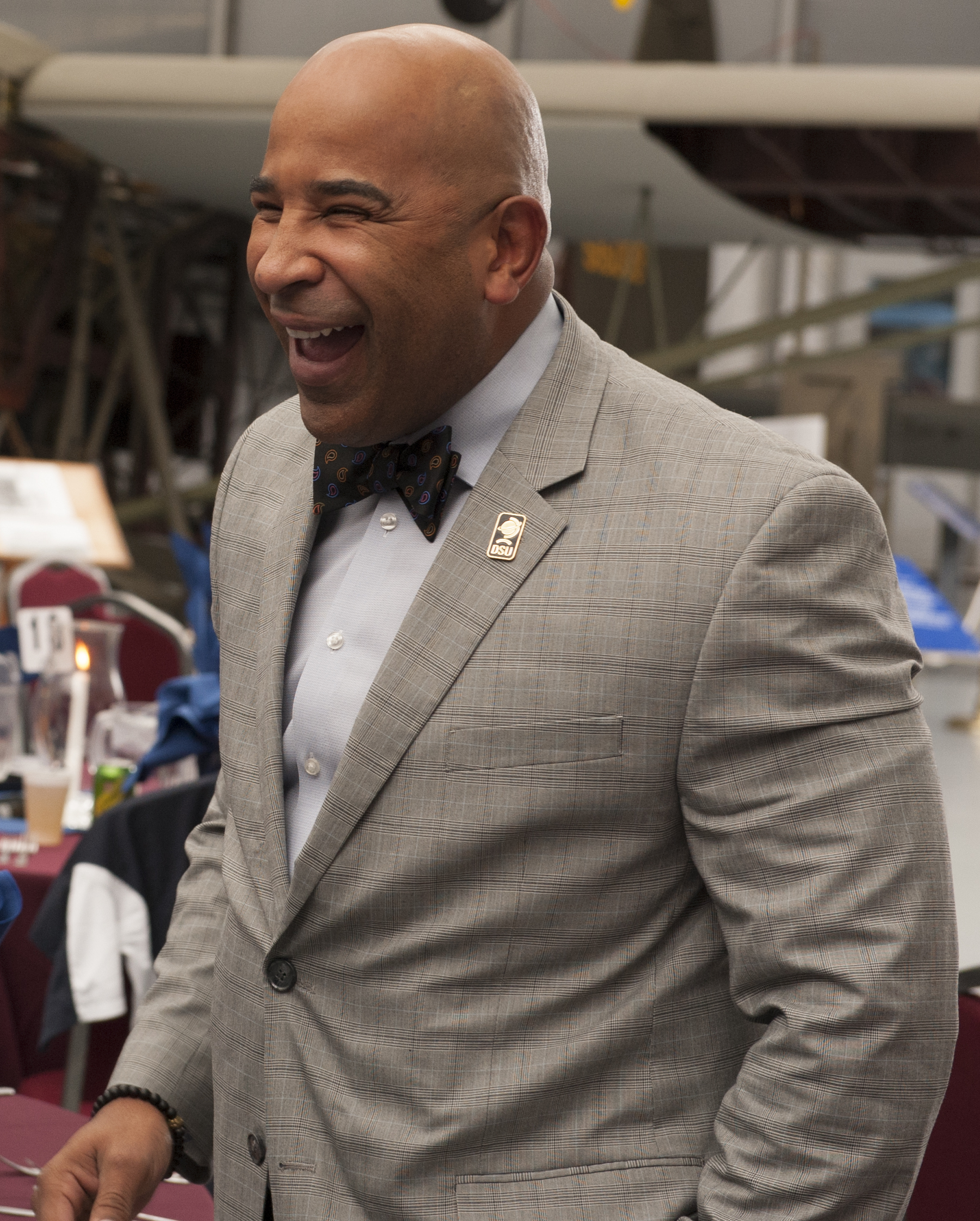
- Carter at Dover Air Force Base in 2016

Biographical details
- Born: December 2, 1967 (age 58)
- Education: The Citadel

Playing career
- 1986–1989: The Citadel
- Position: Linebacker

Coaching career (HC unless noted)
- 1993: Furman (TE)
- 1994–1998: The Citadel (DB/RB)
- 1999: LSU (OLB)
- 2000: Pittsburgh (RB)
- 2001–2003: Penn State (WR)
- 2004–2007: Vanderbilt (RB)
- 2008–2009: Florida (RB)
- 2010–2013: Louisville (RB)
- 2014: Youngstown State (WR)
- 2015–2017: Delaware State

Kenneth Carter (born December 2, 1967) is a former head football coach of Delaware State University, in Dover, Delaware. Carter was formally announced as the head coach of the Hornets on January 21, 2015, and succeeded Kermit Blount at the position. Carter's three-year contract was not renewed in 2017.

== Head coaching record ==
Year	Team	Overall	Conference	Standing	Bowl/playoffs
Delaware State Hornets (Mid-Eastern Athletic Conference) (2015–2017)
2015	Delaware State	1–10	1–7	T–8th	
2016	Delaware State	0–11	0–8	11th	
2017	Delaware State	2–9	2–6	T–8th	
Delaware State:		3–30	3–21		
Total:		3–30			
