= 2017 North Carolina Central Eagles football team =

American college football season

2017 North Carolina Central Eagles football
- Conference: Mid-Eastern Athletic Conference
- Record: 7–4 (5–3 MEAC)
- Head coach: Jerry Mack (4th season)
- Offensive coordinator: T. C. Taylor (3rd season)
- Defensive coordinator: Granville Eastman (4th season)
- Home stadium: O'Kelly–Riddick Stadium

2017 Mid-Eastern Athletic Conference football standings
	Conf.			Overall
Team	W		L	W		L
No. 7 North Carolina A&T $	8	–	0	12	–	0
Howard	6	–	2	7	–	4
Bethune–Cookman	6	–	2	7	–	4
North Carolina Central	5	–	3	7	–	4
Hampton	5	–	3	6	–	5
Norfolk State	4	–	4	4	–	7
Savannah State *	3	–	5	3	–	8
South Carolina State	2	–	6	3	–	7
Florida A&M *	2	–	6	3	–	8
Delaware State	2	–	6	2	–	9
Morgan State *	1	–	7	1	–	10
$ – Conference champion; * Florida A&M, Morgan State and Savannah State ineligible for postseason due to APR violations; Rankings from STATS Poll

The 2017 North Carolina Central Eagles football team represented North Carolina Central University as a member of the Mid-Eastern Athletic Conference (MEAC) during the 2017 NCAA Division I FCS football season. Led by Jerry Mack in his fourth and final season as head coach, the Eagles compiled an overall record of 7–4 with a mark of 5–3, tying for fourth place in the MEAC. North Carolina Central played home games at O'Kelly–Riddick Stadium in Durham, North Carolina.

On December 8, Mack resigned to become the offensive coordinator at Rice University. He finished his four-year tenure at North Carolina Central with a record of 31–15.

== Schedule ==
Date	Time	Opponent	Rank	Site	TV	Result	Attendance
September 2	6:00 p.m.	at Duke*		Wallace Wade Stadium; Durham, NC	ACCN Extra	L 7–60	30,477
September 9	6:00 p.m.	Shaw*		O'Kelly–Riddick Stadium; Durham, NC	NSN	W 41–0	9,141
September 21	7:30 p.m.	South Carolina State		O'Kelly–Riddick Stadium; Durham, NC	ESPNU	W 33–28	9,012
September 28	7:30 p.m.	at Florida A&M		Bragg Memorial Stadium; Tallahassee, FL	ESPNU	W 21–14	18,488
October 7	1:00 p.m.	at Howard		William H. Greene Stadium; Washington, DC	WHBC	W 13–7	1,532
October 14	2:00 p.m.	Gardner–Webb*	No. 25	O'Kelly–Riddick Stadium; Durham, NC	NSN	W 24–17	4,010
October 21	2:00 p.m.	Norfolk State	No. 25	O'Kelly–Riddick Stadium; Durham, NC	NSN	L 21–28	7,431
October 28	2:00 p.m.	Delaware State^{†}		O'Kelly–Riddick Stadium; Durham, NC	NSN	W 42–14	14,117
November 4	1:00 p.m.	at Hampton		Armstrong Stadium; Hampton, VA		W 14–6	5,321
November 11	2:00 p.m.	Bethune–Cookman		O'Kelly–Riddick Stadium; Durham, NC	NSN	L 10–13	5,769
November 18	1:00 p.m.	at No. 9 North Carolina A&T		Aggie Stadium; Greensboro, NC (rivalry)		L 10–24	21,500
*Non-conference game; ^{†}Homecoming; Rankings from STATS Poll released prior to the game; All times are in Eastern time

== Game summaries ==
=== At Duke ===
	1	2	3	4	Total
Eagles	0	7	0	0	7
Blue Devils	21	26	6	7	60

=== Shaw ===
	1	2	3	4	Total
Bears	0	0	0	0	0
Eagles	3	17	0	21	41

=== South Carolina State ===
	1	2	3	4	Total
Bulldogs	7	14	7	0	28
Eagles	7	7	6	13	33

=== At Florida A&M ===
	1	2	3	4	Total
Eagles	14	0	0	7	21
Rattlers	0	14	0	0	14

=== At Howard ===
	1	2	3	4	Total
Eagles	0	6	7	0	13
Bison	7	0	0	0	7

=== Gardner–Webb ===
	1	2	3	4	Total
Runnin' Bulldogs	0	3	0	14	17
No. 25 Eagles	3	7	7	7	24

=== Norfolk State ===
	1	2	3	4	Total
Spartans	7	14	0	7	28
No. 25 Eagles	0	0	7	14	21

=== Delaware State ===
	1	2	3	4	Total
Hornets	0	7	7	0	14
Eagles	14	14	7	7	42

=== At Hampton ===
	1	2	3	4	Total
Eagles	0	14	0	0	14
Pirates	6	0	0	0	6

=== Bethune–Cookman ===
	1	2	3	4	Total
Wildcats	0	0	7	6	13
Eagles	0	0	0	10	10

=== At North Carolina A&T ===
	1	2	3	4	Total
Eagles	0	3	7	0	10
Aggies	7	14	3	0	24

== Ranking movements ==
Ranking movements Legend: ██ Increase in ranking ██ Decrease in ranking — = Not ranked RV = Received votes
	Week													
Poll	Pre	1	2	3	4	5	6	7	8	9	10	11	12	Final
STATS FCS	RV	RV	RV	RV	RV	RV	25	25	RV	RV	RV	RV	RV	RV
Coaches	24	RV	RV	—	RV	—	RV	RV	RV	RV	RV	—	—	—
