= Mac McCain III =

American football player (born 1998)

Profile
- Position: Cornerback

Personal information
- Born: February 6, 1998 (age 28); Greensboro, North Carolina, U.S.
- Listed height: 6 ft 0 in (1.83 m)
- Listed weight: 185 lb (84 kg)

Career information
- High school: James B. Dudley (Greensboro)
- College: North Carolina A&T (2017–2020)
- NFL draft: 2021: undrafted

Career history
- Denver Broncos (2021)*; Philadelphia Eagles (2021); Denver Broncos (2021); Philadelphia Eagles (2021–2022); Detroit Lions (2023)*; Carolina Panthers (2023)*; San Antonio Brahmas (2024)*; New Orleans Saints (2024)*; St. Louis Battlehawks (2025); BC Lions (2026)
- * Offseason or practice squad member only

Career NFL statistics
- Total tackles: 3
- Stats at Pro Football Reference

Franklin "Mac" McCain III (born February 6, 1998) is an American professional football cornerback. He played college football for North Carolina A&T and was signed as an undrafted free agent by the Denver Broncos in 2021.

== Early life and education ==
Franklin "Mac" McCain III was born on February 6, 1998, in Greensboro, North Carolina. He attended James B. Dudley High School, compiling 96 tackles in his final two seasons, and earning all-area honorable mention honors as a senior. He earned a scholarship offer from North Carolina A&T in 2017.

As a true freshman, McCain III started all 12 games, making six interceptions, three returned for touchdowns. In an upset win over Charlotte in his third game, he made a game-winning "pick six" in an upset 35–31 win. One week later, against Morgan State, McCain III returned an interception 100 yards for a touchdown. He placed second on the team with 50 tackles, and ranked eighth in the nation for interceptions per game.

As a sophomore, McCain III started all 8 games before suffering a season-ending knee injury. He finished the season with 37 tackles, 2 interceptions, and 10 pass deflections. Even though he missed the final four games, he still earned first-team all MEAC honors. In the second game of the season, he made a game-winning 100 yard pick six similar to the previous season's. He started nine games as a junior, before another season-ending injury occurred. He finished the year with 26 tackles and no interceptions. He did not play in 2020, as the season was canceled due to COVID-19.

== Professional career ==
Pre-draft measurables
Height	Weight	Arm length	Hand span	40-yard dash	10-yard split	20-yard split	20-yard shuttle	Three-cone drill	Vertical jump	Broad jump	Bench press
5 ft 11 in (1.80 m)	186 lb (84 kg)	31 in (0.79 m)	9 1/4 in (0.23 m)	4.45/4.48 s	1.57 s	2.58 s	4.20 s	7.09 s	35.5 in (0.90 m)	10 ft 3 in (3.12 m)	13 reps
All values from Pro Day

=== Denver Broncos ===
After going unselected in the 2021 NFL draft, McCain III was signed as an undrafted free agent by the Denver Broncos. He was released on August 31 as part of final roster cuts and subsequently signed to the practice squad.

=== Philadelphia Eagles (first stint) ===
On September 7, 2021, McCain III was signed by the Philadelphia Eagles off the Broncos practice squad. He made his NFL debut in week three, playing 13 special teams snaps in the 21–41 loss at the Dallas Cowboys. He was released on November 9.

=== Denver Broncos (second stint) ===
On November 10, 2021, McCain III was claimed off waivers by the Denver Broncos. He was waived on November 23.

=== Philadelphia Eagles (second stint) ===
On November 24, 2021, the Eagles claimed McCain III off of waivers. He was waived on December 8. He was re-signed to the practice squad on December 13. McCain III signed a reserve/future contract with the Eagles on January 18, 2022.

On August 30, 2022, McCain III was waived by the Eagles as part of final roster cuts and re-signed to the practice squad. He was released from the practice squad on November 17, then re-signed a week later.

=== Detroit Lions ===
On February 23, 2023, McCain III signed with the Detroit Lions. He was released on May 10.

=== Carolina Panthers ===
On August 4, 2023, McCain III signed with the Carolina Panthers. He was waived on August 29 as part of final roster cuts.

=== San Antonio Brahmas ===
On January 22, 2024, McCain III signed with the San Antonio Brahmas of the United Football League (UFL). He was released on March 10.

=== New Orleans Saints ===
On June 20, 2024, McCain III signed with the New Orleans Saints. He was waived on August 27 as part of final roster cuts.

=== St. Louis Battlehawks ===
McCain III signed with the St. Louis Battlehawks of the UFL on June 3, 2025. He was released by the Battlehawks on March 19, 2026.

=== BC Lions ===
On August 28, 2026, McCain III signed with the BC Lions of the Canadian Football League, joining their practice roster. On October 22, 2026, McCain III was promoted to the Lions' active roster. On October 26, 2026, McCain III was reassigned to the Lions' practice roster ahead of the Western Semi-Final. On November 8, 2026, McCain III became a free agent as his contract expired at the conclusion of the Lions' season.

== Personal life ==
McCain III is the grandson of civil rights activist Franklin McCain III.
