= 2017 Hampton Pirates football team =

American college football season

2017 Hampton Pirates football
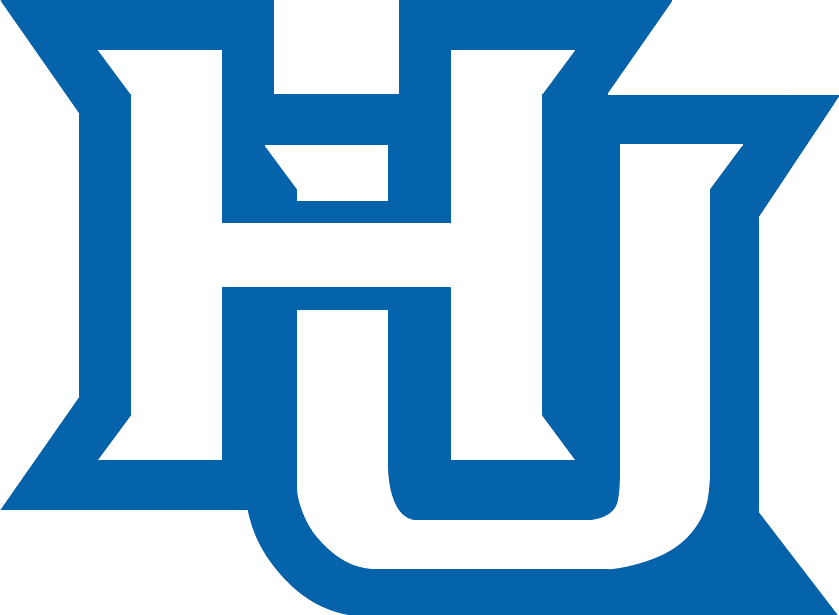
- Conference: Mid-Eastern Athletic Conference
- Record: 6–5 (5–3 MEAC)
- Head coach: Connell Maynor (4th season)
- Defensive coordinator: Mike Ketchum (3rd season)
- Home stadium: Armstrong Stadium

2017 Mid-Eastern Athletic Conference football standings
	Conf.			Overall
Team	W		L	W		L
No. 7 North Carolina A&T $	8	–	0	12	–	0
Howard	6	–	2	7	–	4
Bethune–Cookman	6	–	2	7	–	4
North Carolina Central	5	–	3	7	–	4
Hampton	5	–	3	6	–	5
Norfolk State	4	–	4	4	–	7
Savannah State *	3	–	5	3	–	8
South Carolina State	2	–	6	3	–	7
Florida A&M *	2	–	6	3	–	8
Delaware State	2	–	6	2	–	9
Morgan State *	1	–	7	1	–	10
$ – Conference champion; * Florida A&M, Morgan State and Savannah State ineligible for postseason due to APR violations; Rankings from STATS Poll

The 2017 Hampton Pirates football team represented Hampton University in the 2017 NCAA Division I FCS football season. They were led by fourth-year head coach Connell Maynor and played their home games at Armstrong Stadium. They were a member of the Mid-Eastern Athletic Conference (MEAC). They finished the season 6–5, 5–3 in MEAC play to finish in a tie for fourth place.

This was Hampton's final season as a member of the MEAC. On November 16, 2017, the school announced they would become a full member of the Big South Conference in 2018. Due to scheduling reasons, they were to remain in the MEAC for football in 2018. However, the MEAC refused to allow Hampton to remain in the conference, with no MEAC schools agreeing to play them, forcing the Pirates to become an FCS independent for 2018 before joining the Big South in 2019.

On November 20, 2017, head coach Connell Maynor resigned to become the head coach at Alabama A&M. He finished at Hampton with a four-year record of 20–25.

== Schedule ==
Date	Time	Opponent	Site	TV	Result	Attendance
September 2	7:00 p.m.	at Ohio*	Peden Stadium; Athens, OH	ESPN3	L 0–59	17,501
September 8	7:00 p.m.	Delaware State	Armstrong Stadium; Hampton, VA	PTV	W 28–15	6,456
September 16	6:00 p.m.	Livingstone*	Armstrong Stadium; Hampton, VA	PTV	W 59–0	5,234
September 23	2:00 p.m.	Monmouth*	Armstrong Stadium; Hampton, VA	PTV	L 23–30 ^{OT}	5,123
October 7	2:00 p.m.	at Savannah State	Ted Wright Stadium; Savannah, GA	SSAA	W 17–10	6,990
October 14	2:00 p.m.	at Norfolk State	William "Dick" Price Stadium; Norfolk, VA (Battle of the Bay)	ESPNU	W 16–14	6,149
October 21	2:00 p.m.	Florida A&M^{†}	Armstrong Stadium; Hampton, VA	PTV	W 31–27	12,251
October 28	4:00 p.m.	at Bethune–Cookman	Municipal Stadium; Daytona Beach, FL	CEN	L 21–24	10,951
November 4	1:00 p.m.	North Carolina Central	Armstrong Stadium; Hampton, VA	PTV	L 6–14	5,321
November 11	1:30 p.m.	at South Carolina State	Oliver C. Dawson Stadium; Orangeburg, SC	FloFootball	L 15–33	8,491
November 18	1:00 p.m.	Howard	Armstrong Stadium; Hampton, VA (Battle of "The Real HU")	PTV	W 20–17	8,142
*Non-conference game; ^{†}Homecoming; All times are in Eastern time

- Source: Schedule

== Game summaries ==
=== At Ohio ===
	1	2	3	4	Total
Pirates	0	0	0	0	0
Bobcats	7	13	26	13	59

=== Delaware State ===
	1	2	3	4	Total
Hornets	5	10	0	0	15
Pirates	7	14	0	7	28

=== Livingstone ===
	1	2	3	4	Total
Blue Bears	0	0	0	0	0
Pirates	21	14	21	3	59

=== Monmouth ===
	1	2	3	4	OT	Total
Hawks	0	14	9	0	7	30
Pirates	13	3	0	7	0	23

=== At Savannah State ===
	1	2	3	4	Total
Pirates	7	0	3	7	17
Tigers	7	0	0	3	10

=== At Norfolk State ===
	1	2	3	4	Total
Pirates	14	0	2	0	16
Spartans	0	7	0	7	14

=== Florida A&M ===
	1	2	3	4	Total
Rattlers	3	7	7	10	27
Pirates	7	14	0	10	31

=== At Bethune–Cookman ===
	1	2	3	4	Total
Pirates	7	0	14	0	21
Wildcats	14	3	0	7	24

=== North Carolina Central ===
	1	2	3	4	Total
Eagles	0	14	0	0	14
Pirates	6	0	0	0	6

=== At South Carolina State ===
	1	2	3	4	Total
Pirates	0	0	7	8	15
Bulldogs	9	10	7	7	33

=== Howard ===
	1	2	3	4	Total
Bison	0	3	7	7	17
Pirates	7	0	7	6	20
