= 2017 South Carolina State Bulldogs football team =

American college football season

2017 South Carolina State Bulldogs football
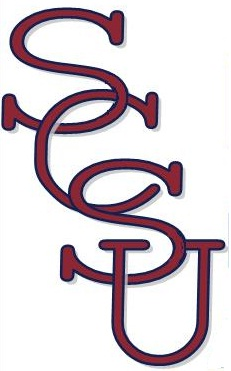
- Conference: Mid-Eastern Athletic Conference
- Record: 3–7 (2–6 MEAC)
- Head coach: Oliver Pough (16th season)
- Offensive coordinator: Daniel Lewis (1st season)
- Defensive coordinator: Tommy Restivo (1st season)
- Home stadium: Oliver C. Dawson Stadium

2017 Mid-Eastern Athletic Conference football standings
	Conf.			Overall
Team	W		L	W		L
No. 7 North Carolina A&T $	8	–	0	12	–	0
Howard	6	–	2	7	–	4
Bethune–Cookman	6	–	2	7	–	4
North Carolina Central	5	–	3	7	–	4
Hampton	5	–	3	6	–	5
Norfolk State	4	–	4	4	–	7
Savannah State *	3	–	5	3	–	8
South Carolina State	2	–	6	3	–	7
Florida A&M *	2	–	6	3	–	8
Delaware State	2	–	6	2	–	9
Morgan State *	1	–	7	1	–	10
$ – Conference champion; * Florida A&M, Morgan State and Savannah State ineligible for postseason due to APR violations; Rankings from STATS Poll

The 2017 South Carolina State Bulldogs football team represented South Carolina State University in the 2017 NCAA Division I FCS football season. They were led by 16th-year head coach Oliver Pough and played their home games at Oliver C. Dawson Stadium. They were a member of the Mid-Eastern Athletic Conference (MEAC). They finished the season 3–7, 2–6 in MEAC play to finish in a three-way tie for eighth place.

== Schedule ==
Date	Time	Opponent	Site	TV	Result	Attendance
September 3	2:30 p.m.	at Southern*	Ace W. Mumford Stadium; Baton Rouge, LA (MEAC/SWAC Challenge)	ESPN2	L 8–14	10,006
September 9 ^{[a]}	2:30 p.m.	No. 16 Charleston Southern*	Oliver C. Dawson Stadium; Orangeburg, SC		Cancelled	
September 16	2:00 p.m.	Johnson C. Smith*	Oliver C. Dawson Stadium; Orangeburg, SC		W 41–0	12,000
September 21	7:30 p.m.	at North Carolina Central	O'Kelly–Riddick Stadium; Durham, NC	ESPNU	L 28–33	9,012
September 30	6:00 p.m.	No. 17 North Carolina A&T	Oliver C. Dawson Stadium; Orangeburg, SC (rivalry)	FloFootball	L 7–21	14,789
October 6	7:30 p.m.	Morgan State	Oliver C. Dawson Stadium; Orangeburg, SC	ESPNU	W 35–14	9,038
October 14	4:00 p.m.	at Bethune–Cookman	Municipal Stadium; Daytona Beach, FL	CENCatEye Network	L 9–12	6,191
October 21	2:00 p.m.	at Delaware State	Alumni Stadium; Dover, DE	WDSU-TV	L 14–17	1,270
October 28	1:30 p.m.	Howard^{†}	Oliver C. Dawson Stadium; Orangeburg, SC	FloFootball	L 20–28	15,089
November 11	1:30 p.m.	Hampton	Oliver C. Dawson Stadium; Orangeburg, SC	FloFootball	W 33–15	8,491
November 18	1:00 p.m.	at Savannah State	Ted Wright Stadium; Savannah, GA		L 10–34	3,015
*Non-conference game; ^{†}Homecoming; Rankings from STATS Poll released prior to the game; All times are in Eastern time

^{^[a]}The game between Charleston Southern and South Carolina, recently had been rescheduled in advance of the arrival of Hurricane Irma, but on September 7, both schools agreed to postpone the game later in the season, but was ultimately cancelled.

== Game summaries ==
=== At Southern (MEAC/SWAC Challenge) ===
	1	2	3	4	Total
Bulldogs	3	3	2	0	8
Jaguars	7	7	0	0	14

=== Johnson C. Smith ===
	1	2	3	4	Total
Golden Bulls	0	0	0	0	0
Bulldogs	16	3	10	12	41

=== At North Carolina Central ===
	1	2	3	4	Total
Bulldogs	7	14	7	0	28
Eagles	7	7	6	13	33

=== North Carolina A&T ===
	1	2	3	4	Total
No. 17 Aggies	0	12	6	3	21
Bulldogs	0	0	0	7	7

=== Morgan State ===
	1	2	3	4	Total
Bears	7	3	4	0	14
Bulldogs	7	0	7	21	35

=== At Bethune–Cookman ===
	1	2	3	4	Total
Wildcats	3	6	0	3	12
Bulldogs	0	9	0	0	9

=== At Delaware State ===
	1	2	3	4	Total
Bulldogs	0	7	0	7	14
Hornets	14	0	0	3	17

=== Howard ===
	1	2	3	4	Total
Bison					0
Bulldogs					0

=== Hampton ===
	1	2	3	4	Total
Pirates					0
Bulldogs					0

=== At Savannah State ===
	1	2	3	4	Total
Bulldogs					0
Tigers					0
