= 2017 Norfolk State Spartans football team =

American college football season

2017 Norfolk State Spartans football
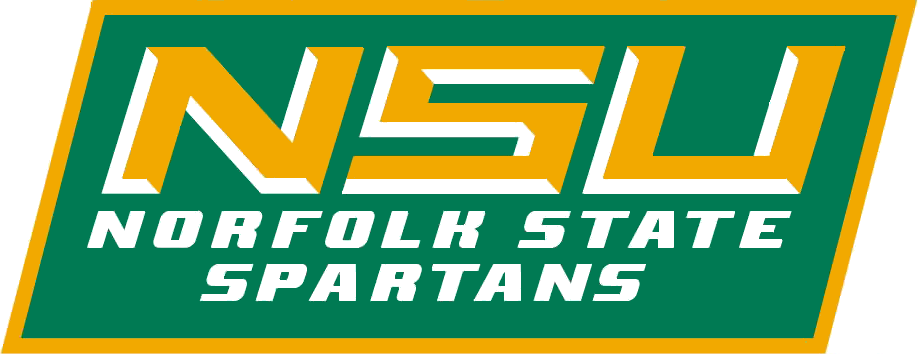
- Conference: Mid-Eastern Athletic Conference
- Record: 4–7 (4–4 MEAC)
- Head coach: Latrell Scott (3rd season)
- Offensive coordinator: Mike Faragalli (2nd season)
- Co-defensive coordinators: Andrew Faison (2nd season); Matt Dawson (1st season)
- Home stadium: William "Dick" Price Stadium

2017 Mid-Eastern Athletic Conference football standings
	Conf.			Overall
Team	W		L	W		L
No. 7 North Carolina A&T $	8	–	0	12	–	0
Howard	6	–	2	7	–	4
Bethune–Cookman	6	–	2	7	–	4
North Carolina Central	5	–	3	7	–	4
Hampton	5	–	3	6	–	5
Norfolk State	4	–	4	4	–	7
Savannah State *	3	–	5	3	–	8
South Carolina State	2	–	6	3	–	7
Florida A&M *	2	–	6	3	–	8
Delaware State	2	–	6	2	–	9
Morgan State *	1	–	7	1	–	10
$ – Conference champion; * Florida A&M, Morgan State and Savannah State ineligible for postseason due to APR violations; Rankings from STATS Poll

The 2017 Norfolk State Spartans football team represented Norfolk State University in the 2017 NCAA Division I FCS football season. They were led by third-year head coach Latrell Scott and played their home games at William "Dick" Price Stadium. They were a member of the Mid-Eastern Athletic Conference (MEAC). They finished the season 4–7, 4–4 in MEAC play to finish in sixth place.

== Schedule ==
Date	Time	Opponent	Site	TV	Result	Attendance
September 2	6:00 p.m.	Virginia State*	William "Dick" Price Stadium; Norfolk, VA	SSC	L 10–14	10,221
September 9	6:00 p.m.	William & Mary*	William "Dick" Price Stadium; Norfolk, VA	SSC	L 6–20	7,615
September 16	3:30 p.m.	at No. 1 James Madison*	Bridgeforth Stadium; Harrisonburg, VA	MASN2	L 14–75	23,118
September 23	2:00 p.m.	at Delaware State	Alumni Stadium; Dover, DE	WDSU-TV	W 17–7	2,491
October 7	2:00 p.m.	Florida A&M	William "Dick" Price Stadium; Norfolk, VA	SSC	W 35–28	3,623
October 14	2:00 p.m.	Hampton	William "Dick" Price Stadium; Norfolk, VA (Battle of the Bay)	ESPNU	L 14–16	6,149
October 21	2:00 p.m.	at No. 25 North Carolina Central	O'Kelly–Riddick Stadium; Durham, NC	NSN	W 28–21	7,431
October 28	2:00 p.m.	Savannah State	William "Dick" Price Stadium; Norfolk, VA	SSC	L 9–27	17,218
November 4	1:00 p.m.	No. 9 North Carolina A&T	William "Dick" Price Stadium; Norfolk, VA	SSC	L 7–35	6,082
November 11	1:00 p.m.	at Howard	William H. Greene Stadium; Washington, D.C.		L 24–28	1,678
November 18	1:00 p.m.	at Morgan State	Hughes Stadium; Baltimore, MD	Facebook	W 45–32	1,276
*Non-conference game; Rankings from STATS Poll released prior to the game; All times are in Eastern time

- Source: Schedule

== Game summaries ==
=== Virginia State ===
	1	2	3	4	Total
Trojans	7	0	7	0	14
Spartans	3	7	0	0	10

=== William & Mary ===
	1	2	3	4	Total
Tribe	0	13	7	0	20
Spartans	0	3	3	0	6

=== At James Madison ===
	1	2	3	4	Total
Spartans	0	7	0	7	14
No. 1 Dukes	9	35	17	14	75

=== At Delaware State ===
	1	2	3	4	Total
Spartans	0	3	7	7	17
Hornets	0	0	0	7	7

=== Florida A&M ===
	1	2	3	4	Total
Rattlers	7	7	7	7	28
Spartans	0	14	6	15	35

=== Hampton ===
	1	2	3	4	Total
Pirates	14	0	2	0	16
Spartans	0	7	0	7	14

=== At North Carolina Central ===
	1	2	3	4	Total
Spartans	7	14	0	7	28
No. 25 Eagles	0	0	7	14	21

=== Savannah State ===
	1	2	3	4	Total
Tigers	0	6	7	14	27
Spartans	6	0	0	3	9

=== North Carolina A&T ===
	1	2	3	4	Total
No. 9 Aggies	7	7	14	7	35
Spartans	0	7	0	0	7

=== At Howard ===
	1	2	3	4	Total
Spartans	14	10	0	0	24
Spartans	7	7	0	14	28

=== At Morgan State ===
	1	2	3	4	Total
Spartans	7	14	9	15	45
Bears	8	12	12	0	32
