= 2017 Howard Bison football team =

American college football season

2017 Howard Bison football
- Conference: Mid-Eastern Athletic Conference
- Record: 7–4 (6–2 MEAC)
- Head coach: Mike London (1st season)
- Offensive coordinator: Brennan Marion (1st season)
- Co-defensive coordinators: Vince Brown (1st season); Chip West (1st season)
- Home stadium: William H. Greene Stadium

2017 Mid-Eastern Athletic Conference football standings
	Conf.			Overall
Team	W		L	W		L
No. 7 North Carolina A&T $	8	–	0	12	–	0
Howard	6	–	2	7	–	4
Bethune–Cookman	6	–	2	7	–	4
North Carolina Central	5	–	3	7	–	4
Hampton	5	–	3	6	–	5
Norfolk State	4	–	4	4	–	7
Savannah State *	3	–	5	3	–	8
South Carolina State	2	–	6	3	–	7
Florida A&M *	2	–	6	3	–	8
Delaware State	2	–	6	2	–	9
Morgan State *	1	–	7	1	–	10
$ – Conference champion; * Florida A&M, Morgan State and Savannah State ineligible for postseason due to APR violations; Rankings from STATS Poll

The 2017 Howard Bison football team represented Howard University as a member of the Mid-Eastern Athletic Conference (MEAC) during the 2017 NCAA Division I FCS football season. Led by first-year head coach Mike London, the Bison compiled an overall record of 7–4 with a mark of 6–2, tying for second place in the MEAC. Howard played home games at William H. Greene Stadium in Washington, D.C.

The Bison opened the season by defeating UNLV, a 45-point favorite, in the biggest upset in college football history by point spread.

== Schedule ==
Date	Time	Opponent	Site	TV	Result	Attendance
September 2	9:00 p.m.	at UNLV*	Sam Boyd Stadium; Whitney, NV	Stadium	W 43–40	15,667
September 9	3:30 p.m.	at Kent State*	Dix Stadium; Kent, OH	ESPN3	L 31–38	20,312
September 16	2:00 p.m.	at No. 8 Richmond*	E. Claiborne Robins Stadium; Richmond, VA	CSN MA+	L 21–68	8,217
September 23	1:00 p.m.	Bethune–Cookman	William H. Greene Stadium; Washington, DC	WHBC	W 26–24	2,217
October 7	1:00 p.m.	North Carolina Central	William H. Greene Stadium; Washington, DC	WHBC	L 7–13	1,532
October 14	2:00 p.m.	at Delaware State	Alumni Stadium; Dover, DE	WDSU-TV	W 52–23	3,337
October 21	1:00 p.m.	Morgan State^{†}	William H. Greene Stadium; Washington, DC (rivalry)	SPORTSfever TV, ESPN3	W 39–14	2,700
October 28	1:30 p.m.	at South Carolina State	Oliver C. Dawson Stadium; Orangeburg, SC	FloFootball	W 28–20	15,096
November 4	4:00 p.m.	at Florida A&M	Bragg Memorial Stadium; Tallahassee, FL	RV	W 37–26	17,234
November 11	1:00 p.m.	Norfolk State	William H. Greene Stadium; Washington, D.C.	WHBC	W 28–24	1,678
November 18	1:00 p.m.	at Hampton	Armstrong Stadium; Hampton, VA (The Real HU)		L 17–20	8,142
*Non-conference game; ^{†}Homecoming; Rankings from STATS Poll released prior to the game; All times are in Eastern time

== Ranking movements ==
Ranking movements Legend: ██ Increase in ranking ██ Decrease in ranking — = Not ranked RV = Received votes
	Week														
Poll	Pre	1	2	3	4	5	6	7	8	9	10	11	12	13	Final
STATS	—	RV	RV	RV	RV	RV	—	—	—	RV	RV	RV	RV		Not released
Coaches															
BoxToRow Media Poll and Coaches Poll (BTR)	—	6	5	8	5	6	10	9	8	6	6	5			

== Game summaries ==
=== At UNLV ===
Howard at UNLV

Team	1	2	3	4	Total
• Bison	7	14	7	15	43
Rebels	6	14	13	7	40

- Date: September 2, 2017
- Location:
  Sam Boyd Stadium
  Whitney, NV
- Game start: 9:06 p.m. EDT
- Elapsed time: 3:29
- Game attendance: 15,667
- Game weather: Temperature: 108 °F (42 °C), Wind: 5 mph ESE, Weather: Clear/Hot
- Referee: Vidal Jones
- TV announcers (Stadium): Tony Cordasco and Joe Arrigo

Scoring summary
1	13:26	Howard	Caylin Newton 52-yard touchdown run (Dakota Lebofsky kick), Drive: 5 plays, 74 yards, 1:34	7–0
1	11:23	UNLV	Evan Pantels 44-yard field goal, Drive: 5 plays, 18 yards, 1:57	7–3
1	05:36	UNLV	Evan Pantels 28-yard field goal, Drive: 5 plays, 36 yards, 2:17	7–6
2	12:56	Howard	Kyle Anthony 1-yard pass from Caylin Newton (Dakota Lebofsky kick), Drive: 13 plays, 75 yards, 4:14	14–6
2	09:14	UNLV	Evan Pantels 26-yard field goal, Drive: 7 plays, 61 yards, 3:39	14–9
2	05:56	Howard	Devin Rollins 75 yard fumble recovery (Dakota Lebofsky kick), Drive: 4 plays, 43 yards, 1:12	21–9
2	01:27	UNLV	Lexington Thomas 1-yard run (Evan Pantels kick), Drive: 11 plays, 69 yards, 4:24	21–16
2	00:00	UNLV	Evan Pantels 30-yard field goal, Drive: 5 plays, 54 yards, 0:49	21–19
3	12:20	UNLV	Devonte Boyd 25-yard pass from Armani Rodgers (Evan Pantels kick), Drive: 1 play, 25 yards, 0:08	21–26
3	06:45	UNLV	Charles William 1-yard run (Evan Pantels kick), Drive: 5 plays, 53 yards, 2:21	21–33
3	01:17	Howard	Anthony Phillyaw 1-yard run (Dakota Lebofsky kick), Drive: 14 plays, 75 yards, 5:32	28–33
4	14:09	Howard	Anthony Phillyaw 11-yard run (Caylin Newton Run for two-point conv.), Drive: 8 plays, 34 yards, 2:04	36–33
4	10:12	UNLV	Lexington Thomas 3-yard (Evan Pantels kick), Drive: 10 plays, 75 yards, 3:57	36–40
4	07:34	Howard	Caylin Newton 4-yard run (Dakota Lebofsky kick), Drive: 7 plays, 68 yards, 2:32	43–40

The Bison opened their 2017 season on the road against Football Bowl Subdivision (FBS) opponent UNLV in Whitney, NV. Despite being a 45-point underdog to the Rebels, the Bison were able to leave Las Vegas with their first win over a Division I FBS opponent in the program's history. Following the win, media outlets immediately hailed it as the greatest upset in college football history against the spread.

In his collegiate debut, freshman quarterback Caylin Newton completed 15 of 26 passes for a total 190 yards; he threw 1 touchdown, a 1-yard pass in the 2nd quarter, and 1 interception. Newton was also able to display his abilities on the ground by leading in rushing yards with 21 carries, 190 yards and 2 touchdowns. Senior running back Anthony Phillyaw ran for 71 yards on s completions for 2 touchdowns. Phillyaw was also the top receiver with 3 receptions, 62 yards, 20.7 yards per reception.

=== At Kent State ===
Howard at Kent State

Team	1	2	3	4	Total
Bison	7	7	10	7	31
• Golden Flashes	14	7	2	15	38

- Date: September 9, 2017
- Location:
  Dix Stadium
  Kent, OH
- Game start: 3:35 p.m. EDT
- Elapsed time: 3:47
- Game attendance: 20,312
- Game weather: Temperature: 66 °F (19 °C), Wind: 8 mph NNE, Weather: Partly Cloudy
- Referee: Matt Packowski
- TV announcers (ESPN3): Michael Reghi and Jerod Cherry

Scoring summary
1	13:34	Kent State	Nick Holley 38-yard run (Shane Hynes kick), Drive: 1 play, 38 yards, 0:10	0–7
1	09:29	Kent State	Justin Rankin 25-yard pass from Nick Holley (Shane Hynes kick), Drive: 5 plays, 38 yards, 2:27	0–14
1	08:33	Howard	Kyle Anthony 16-yard pass from Caylin Newton (Dakota Lebofsky kick), Drive: 3 plays, 77 yards, 0:49	7–14
2	12:12	Kent State	Raekwon James 25-yard pass from Nick Holley (Shane Hynes kick), Drive: 8 plays, 52 yards, 4:34	7–21
2	02:05	Howard	Anthony Philyaw 75-yard run (Dakota Lebofsky kick), Drive: 2 plays, 97 yards, 0:36	14–21
3	09:52	Howard	Dakota Lebofsky 23-yard field goal, Drive: 8 plays, 46 yards, 2:54	17–21
3	06:15	Kent State	Team Safety, Drive: 7 plays, −5 yards, 2:09	17–23
3	02:09	Howard	Caylin Newton 1-yard run (Dakota Lebofsky kick), Drive: 11 plays, 60 yards, 3:37	24–23
4	12:35	Kent State	Kesean Gamble 1-yard run (Nick Holley Run for two-point conv.), Drive: 11 plays, 58 yards, 4:21	24–31
4	05:56	Kent State	Kesean Gamble 3-yard run (Nick Holley Run for two-point conv.), Drive: 9 plays, 34 yards, 4:56	24–38
4	03:16	Howard	Caylin Newton 4-yard run (Dakota Lebofsky kick), Drive: 9 plays, 79 yards, 2:36	31–38

After their first win over an FBS team in program history, the Bison were looking to make lightning strike two weeks in a row with a win over Kent State. Kent State's fourth quarter rally, and an interception by Kent State's Demetrius Monday gave the Golden Flashes the win. The Bison recorded 432 yards of total offense, including 226 yards passing and 206 yards Rushing. Quarterback Caliyn Newton threw 9 for 22 completions with a total 225 yards passing including 1 touchdown, and 1 interception. Other standout performers include: Running Back Anthony Philyaw who ran for 147 yards rushing on 20 carries, including 1 touchdown and receiver Jequez Ezzard who recorded 120 yards.

== Personnel ==
=== Coaching staff ===
2017 Howard Bison coaching staff
Head coach: Head coach – Mike London; Offensive coaches: Offensive coordinator/quarterbacks – Brennan Marion; Special teams coordinator/ running backs – Kenny Lucas; Run game coordinator/ offensive line – Darryl Bullock; Wide receivers – Mike London Jr.; Halfback/Slot Wide Receivers – David Clowney; Defensive coaches: Defensive coordinator/linebackers/assistant head coach – Vince Brown; Co-defensive coordinator/Cornerbacks/recruiting coordinator – Chip West; Safeties/Assistant Recruiting coordinator – Cato June; Defensive line – Keenan Carter; Defensive quality control – Ras-I Dowling	Administrative staff: Athletic Director (A.D.) – Kery Davis; Director of football operations – Bryce Bevill

=== Roster ===
2017 Howard Bison Roster (Source)
Wide receivers: 1 Guy Lemonier Jr. – Senior; 8 Antoine Murray – Freshman; 12 Jequez Ezzard – Sophomore; 13 Jordan Scott – Freshman; 14 Evan Brooks – (redshirt) Junior; 80 Damion Gillespie – Sophomore; 81 Kyle Anthony – Sophomore; 82 Tamlin Antoine – Freshman; 83 Jaelin Ferdinand – Freshman; 83 Chanse Pullen – Freshman; 84 David Terrell, Jr. – Freshman; 85 Justin Dooley – Freshman; Offensive line: 61 Alec Damier – Sophomore; 62 Branden Johnson – Freshman; 63 Gerald Wright – Senior; 65 Aaron Hutchins – (redshirt) Senior; 67 Jordan Dunham – (redshirt) Senior; 68 Demontre Buckson – Sophomore; 70 Tyler Shadrach – Senior; 73 James Holmon – (redshirt) Junior; 75 Sean Smith – Sophomore; 78 Phillip Flemming – Sophomore; Tight ends: 53 Tyrone Ramsey – (redshirt) Sophomore; 55 Howard Warren – (redshirt) Senior; 87 Mason Jordan – Freshman; Fullbacks: 4 Da'Vaun Johnson – Freshman	Quarterbacks: 2 Ramar Williams – Freshman; 3 Caylin Newton – Freshman †; 10 Jason Collins – (redshirt) Junior; 15 Kalen Johnson – Senior; 16 John Petricca – (redshirt) Sophomore; Running backs: 7 Anthony Philyaw – Senior; 11 Jordan Aley – Freshman; 20 Dezmond Wortham – Graduate Student; 22 Ricquaz Brannon – Junior; 30 Quinton Hill – Freshman; 33 Jamonne Williams – Freshman; 44 Amir Lewis – Freshman; 45 Jamal Francois II – Junior; Defensive line: 50 Ken Larkin – Sophomore; 90 James Newell – Freshman; 92 Aaron Motley – Freshman; 93 Mukuka Kusaba – Junior; 96 Tyler Fuller – Sophomore; 98 Saevon Dinkins – Freshman; Defensive ends: 52 Richard Johnson – (redshirt) Senior; 94 Isaiah Fludd – Junior; 99 Tyree Leonard – Freshman; Punters/kickers: 41 Isaiah Moore – Freshman; 42 Dakota Lebofsky – Senior †	Linebackers: 19 Elijah Anglin – Senior; 26 Dominique Smith – (redshirt) Junior; 28 Marcellos Allison – Sophomore; 31 David Lee – Senior; 35 Devin Hurtado – (redshirt) Sophomore; 38 David Hudson – Junior; 40 Devin Rollins – (redshirt) Senior; 46 Leon Fields II – Junior; 47 Semaj Everett – Freshman; 50 Brian Witter – Freshman; 57 Matthew McGill – Freshman; 58 Zuri Godfrey – Freshman; 59 Garrett Reaves – Freshman; Defensive backs: 6 Bryan Cook – Freshman; 17 Tye Freeland – Freshman; 18 Travon Hunt – (redshirt) Senior; 21 Alonte Dunn – Senior; 23 Ibrahim Conteh – Senior; 24 Malcolm Johnson – Senior; 25 Leland Lassiter – (redshirt) Senior; 27 Aaron Walker – Freshman; 29 Yoseff Banks – Senior; 32 Merrick Sims – Sophomore; 34 Jayson Robinson – Freshman; 36 Taejuan Gray – Freshman; 37 Charles Robinson – (redshirt) Junior; 48 Jayson Heyward – Freshman; 49 Dimitrius Hutcherson – Freshman
† Starter at position * Injured; did not play in 2017.

=== Recruiting ===
On National Signing Day, Howard signed 23 athletes out of high school for their 2017 recruiting class.

College recruiting information (2017)
Name	Hometown	School	Height	Weight	Commit date
Jordan Aley; RB	King George, VA	King George HS	5 ft 8 in (1.73 m)	160 lb (73 kg)	Feb 1, 2017
Jordan Aley; RB	Recruit ratings: No ratings found				
Bryan Cook; CB	Mount Healthy, OH	Mount Healthy	6 ft 0 in (1.83 m)	165 lb (75 kg)	Feb 1, 2017
Bryan Cook; CB	Recruit ratings: No ratings found				
Saevon Dinkins; OL	Waldorf, MD	St. Charles HS	6 ft 3 in (1.91 m)	265 lb (120 kg)	Feb 1, 2017
Saevon Dinkins; OL	Recruit ratings: No ratings found				
Justin Dooley; WR	Lee's Summit, MO	Lee's Summit West HS	6 ft 1 in (1.85 m)	180 lb (82 kg)	Feb 1, 2017
Justin Dooley; WR	Recruit ratings: No ratings found				
Samaj Everett; LB	Paramus, NJ	Paramus Catholic	6 ft 1 in (1.85 m)	220 lb (100 kg)	Feb 1, 2017
Samaj Everett; LB	Recruit ratings: No ratings found				
Jaelin Ferdinand; WR	Madison, AL	Madison Academy	6 ft 1 in (1.85 m)	170 lb (77 kg)	
Jaelin Ferdinand; WR	Recruit ratings: No ratings found				
Tye Freeland; S	Dinwiddie, VA	Dinwiddie HS	5 ft 11 in (1.80 m)	175 lb (79 kg)	Feb 1, 2017
Tye Freeland; S	Recruit ratings: No ratings found				
Taejon Gray; CB	Waldorf, MD	Thomas Stone HS	6 ft 0 in (1.83 m)	170 lb (77 kg)	Feb 1, 2017
Taejon Gray; CB	Recruit ratings: No ratings found				
Quinton Hill; RB	Jefferson Hills, PA	Thomas Jefferson HS	6 ft 0 in (1.83 m)	200 lb (91 kg)	Feb 1, 2017
Quinton Hill; RB	Recruit ratings: No ratings found				
Malik Hyatt; TE	Gastonia, NC	Ashbrook HS	6 ft 2 in (1.88 m)	215 lb (98 kg)	Feb 1, 2017
Malik Hyatt; TE	Recruit ratings: No ratings found				
Branden Johnson; C	Olney, MD	Our Lady of Good Counsel	6 ft 2 in (1.88 m)	285 lb (129 kg)	Feb 1, 2017
Branden Johnson; C	Recruit ratings: No ratings found				
Malcolm Johnson; S	Springdale, MD	Charles H. Flowers HS	5 ft 10 in (1.78 m)	160 lb (73 kg)	Feb 1, 2017
Malcolm Johnson; S	Recruit ratings: No ratings found				
Tyree Leonard; RB	Jonesboro, GA	Mount Zion HS	6 ft 2 in (1.88 m)	220 lb (100 kg)	Feb 1, 2017
Tyree Leonard; RB	Recruit ratings: No ratings found				
Aaron Motley; DE	Highland Springs, VA	Highland Springs HS	6 ft 2 in (1.88 m)	243 lb (110 kg)	Feb 1, 2017
Aaron Motley; DE	Recruit ratings: No ratings found				
Antoine Murray; WR	Miramar, FL	Miramar HS	6 ft 0 in (1.83 m)	180 lb (82 kg)	Feb 1, 2017
Antoine Murray; WR	Recruit ratings: No ratings found				
Caylin Newton; QB	Atlanta, GA	Grady HS	5 ft 11 in (1.80 m)	185 lb (84 kg)	Feb 1, 2017
Caylin Newton; QB	Recruit ratings: No ratings found				
James Newell; DE	Akron, OH	Buchtel HS	6 ft 2 in (1.88 m)	245 lb (111 kg)	Feb 1, 2017
James Newell; DE	Recruit ratings: No ratings found				
Jayson Robinson; CB	Sterling, VA	Dominion HS	5 ft 10 in (1.78 m)	160 lb (73 kg)	Feb 1, 2017
Jayson Robinson; CB	Recruit ratings: No ratings found				
Jordan Scott; ATH	Montvale, NJ	St. Joseph Regional HS	5 ft 6 in (1.68 m)	163 lb (74 kg)	Feb 1, 2017
Jordan Scott; ATH	Recruit ratings: No ratings found				
David Terrell Jr. WR	Wilmette, IL	Loyola Academy HS	5 ft 11 in (1.80 m)	180 lb (82 kg)	Feb 1, 2017
David Terrell Jr. WR	Recruit ratings: No ratings found				
Aaron Walker; S	Washington, D.C.	Friendship	5 ft 11 in (1.80 m)	195 lb (88 kg)	Feb 1, 2017
Aaron Walker; S	Recruit ratings: No ratings found				
Jamonne Williams; S	DeSoto, TX	DeSoto HS	5 ft 9 in (1.75 m)	178 lb (81 kg)	Feb 1, 2017
Jamonne Williams; S	Recruit ratings: No ratings found				
Brian Witter; LB	Miramar, FL	Miramar HS	6 ft 1 in (1.85 m)	220 lb (100 kg)	Feb 1, 2017
Brian Witter; LB	Recruit ratings: No ratings found				
Overall recruit ranking:
Note: In many cases, Scout, Rivals, 247Sports, On3, and ESPN may conflict in their listings of height and weight.; In these cases, the average was taken. ESPN grades are on a 100-point scale.; Sources: "2017 Team Ranking". Rivals.com.
