= 2017 Florida A&M Rattlers football team =

American college football season

2017 Florida A&M Rattlers football
- Conference: Mid-Eastern Athletic Conference
- Record: 3–8 (2–6 MEAC)
- Head coach: Alex Wood (3rd season)
- Offensive coordinator: Martin Spieler (3rd season)
- Defensive coordinator: Theo Lemon (3rd season)
- Home stadium: Bragg Memorial Stadium

2017 Mid-Eastern Athletic Conference football standings
	Conf.			Overall
Team	W		L	W		L
No. 7 North Carolina A&T $	8	–	0	12	–	0
Howard	6	–	2	7	–	4
Bethune–Cookman	6	–	2	7	–	4
North Carolina Central	5	–	3	7	–	4
Hampton	5	–	3	6	–	5
Norfolk State	4	–	4	4	–	7
Savannah State *	3	–	5	3	–	8
South Carolina State	2	–	6	3	–	7
Florida A&M *	2	–	6	3	–	8
Delaware State	2	–	6	2	–	9
Morgan State *	1	–	7	1	–	10
$ – Conference champion; * Florida A&M, Morgan State and Savannah State ineligible for postseason due to APR violations; Rankings from STATS Poll

The 2017 Florida A&M Rattlers football team represented Florida A&M University in the 2017 NCAA Division I FCS football season. The Rattlers were led by third-year head coach Alex Wood. They played their home games at Bragg Memorial Stadium. They were a member of the Mid-Eastern Athletic Conference (MEAC). They finished the season 3–8, 2–6 in MEAC play to finish in a three-way tie for eighth place.

On November 20, head coach Alex Wood resigned. He finished at Florida A&M with a three-year record of 8–25.

== Schedule ==
Date	Time	Opponent	Site	TV	Result	Attendance
August 26	Noon	Texas Southern*	Bragg Memorial Stadium; Tallahassee, FL (Jake Gaither Classic)	ESPNU	W 29–7	15,401
August 31	8:00 p.m.	at Arkansas*	War Memorial Stadium; Little Rock, AR	SECN	L 7–49	32,580
September 16	6:00 p.m.	vs. No. 22 Tennessee State*	Raymond James Stadium; Tampa, FL (Tampa Classic)	RV	L 13–24	17,102
September 23	6:00 p.m.	at Savannah State	Ted Wright Stadium; Savannah, GA	SSAA	W 20–14	4,670
September 28	7:30 p.m.	North Carolina Central	Bragg Memorial Stadium; Tallahassee, FL	ESPNU	L 14–21	18,488
October 7	2:00 p.m.	at Norfolk State	William "Dick" Price Stadium; Norfolk, VA	SSC	L 28–35	3,623
October 14	3:00 p.m.	No. 15 North Carolina A&T^{†}	Bragg Memorial Stadium; Tallahassee, FL	RV	L 20–31	25,067
October 21	2:00 p.m.	at Hampton	Armstrong Stadium; Hampton, VA	PTV	L 27–31	12,251
October 28	1:00 p.m.	at Morgan State	Hughes Stadium; Baltimore, MD	SPORTSfever TV; ESPN3	W 34–31	2,589
November 4	4:00 p.m.	Howard	Bragg Memorial Stadium; Tallahassee, FL	RV	L 26–37	17,234
November 18	2:00 p.m.	vs. Bethune–Cookman	Camping World Stadium; Orlando, FL (Florida Classic)	ESPN Classic	L 24–29	47,819
*Non-conference game; ^{†}Homecoming; Rankings from STATS Poll released prior to the game; All times are in Eastern time

- Source: Schedule

== Game summaries ==
=== Texas Southern ===
	1	2	3	4	Total
Tigers	0	0	0	7	7
Rattlers	7	13	9	0	29

=== At Arkansas ===
	1	2	3	4	Total
Rattlers	0	0	0	7	7
Razorbacks	7	14	14	14	49

=== vs Tennessee State ===
	1	2	3	4	Total
Rattlers	0	6	0	7	13
No. 22 Tigers	3	7	7	7	24

=== At Savannah State ===
	1	2	3	4	Total
Rattlers	7	7	0	6	20
Tigers	7	0	0	7	14

=== North Carolina Central ===
	1	2	3	4	Total
Eagles	14	0	0	7	21
Rattlers	0	14	0	0	14

=== At Norfolk State ===
	1	2	3	4	Total
Rattlers	7	7	7	7	28
Spartans	0	14	6	15	35

=== North Carolina A&T ===
	1	2	3	4	Total
No. 15 Aggies	7	21	3	0	31
Rattlers	7	0	7	6	20

=== At Hampton ===
	1	2	3	4	Total
Rattlers	3	7	7	10	27
Pirates	7	14	0	10	31

=== At Morgan State ===
	1	2	3	4	Total
Rattlers	7	14	3	10	34
Bears	0	21	3	7	31

=== Howard ===
	1	2	3	4	Total
Bison	7	13	14	3	37
Rattlers	13	10	0	3	26

=== vs Bethune–Cookman ===
	1	2	3	4	Total
Wildcats	7	3	0	19	29
Rattlers	0	10	7	7	24
