= 2017 Savannah State Tigers football team =

American college football season

2017 Savannah State Tigers football
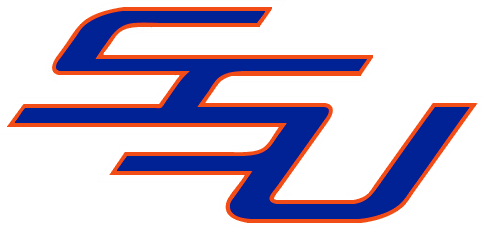
- Conference: Mid-Eastern Athletic Conference
- Record: 3–8 (3–5 MEAC)
- Head coach: Erik Raeburn (2nd season)
- Offensive coordinator: Bill Rychel (2nd season)
- Defensive coordinator: Chad Williams (2nd season)
- Home stadium: Ted A. Wright Stadium

2017 Mid-Eastern Athletic Conference football standings
| | Conf. | | | Overall |
| Team | W | | L | W | | L |
|---|---|---|---|---|---|---|
| No. 7 North Carolina A&T $ | 8 | – | 0 | 12 | – | 0 |
| Howard | 6 | – | 2 | 7 | – | 4 |
| Bethune–Cookman | 6 | – | 2 | 7 | – | 4 |
| North Carolina Central | 5 | – | 3 | 7 | – | 4 |
| Hampton | 5 | – | 3 | 6 | – | 5 |
| Norfolk State | 4 | – | 4 | 4 | – | 7 |
| Savannah State * | 3 | – | 5 | 3 | – | 8 |
| South Carolina State | 2 | – | 6 | 3 | – | 7 |
| Florida A&M * | 2 | – | 6 | 3 | – | 8 |
| Delaware State | 2 | – | 6 | 2 | – | 9 |
| Morgan State * | 1 | – | 7 | 1 | – | 10 |
$ – Conference champion; * Florida A&M, Morgan State and Savannah State ineligible for postseason due to APR violations; Rankings from STATS Poll

The 2017 Savannah State Tigers football team represented Savannah State University in the 2017 NCAA Division I FCS football season. The Tigers were members of the Mid-Eastern Athletic Conference (MEAC). They were led by second-year head coach Erik Raeburn and played their home games at Ted Wright Stadium. They finished the season 3–8, 3–5 in MEAC play to finish in seventh place.

== Schedule ==
| Date | Time | Opponent | Site | TV | Result | Attendance |
|---|---|---|---|---|---|---|
| September 9 | 3:30 p.m. | at Appalachian State* | Kidd Brewer Stadium; Boone, NC | ESPN3 | L 7–54 | 20,109 |
| September 16 | 3:00 p.m. | at Montana* | Washington–Grizzly Stadium; Missoula, MT | GAA; Pluto TV | L 3–56 | 22,228 |
| September 23 | 6:00 p.m. | Florida A&M | Ted A. Wright Stadium; Savannah, GA | SSAA | L 14–20 | 4,670 |
| September 30 | 4:00 p.m. | at Bethune–Cookman | Municipal Stadium; Daytona Beach, FL | CEN | L 12–24 | 6,945 |
| October 7 | 2:00 p.m. | Hampton^{†} | Ted A. Wright Stadium; Savannah, GA | SSAA | L 10–17 | 6,990 |
| October 14 | 1:00 p.m. | at Morgan State | Hughes Stadium; Baltimore, MD | SPORTSfever TV; ESPN3 | L 28–48 | 11,865 |
| October 21 | 6:00 p.m. | at Charleston Southern* | Buccaneer Field; Charleston, SC | BSN | L 27–52 | 3,156 |
| October 28 | 2:00 p.m. | at Norfolk State | William "Dick" Price Stadium; Norfolk, VA | SSC | W 27–9 | 17,218 |
| November 4 | 5:00 p.m. | Delaware State | Ted A. Wright Stadium; Savannah, GA | SSAA | W 35–21 | 2,371 |
| November 11 | 1:00 p.m. | at No. 9 North Carolina A&T | Aggie Stadium; Greensboro, NC | LTV | L 17–36 | 9,397 |
| November 18 | 1:00 p.m. | South Carolina State | Ted A. Wright Stadium; Savannah, GA | SSAA | W 34–10 | 3,015 |
*Non-conference game; ^{†}Homecoming; Rankings from STATS Poll released prior to the game; All times are in Eastern time

- Source: Schedule

== Game summaries ==
=== At Appalachian State ===
| | 1 | 2 | 3 | 4 | Total |
|---|---|---|---|---|---|
| Tigers | 0 | 0 | 0 | 7 | 7 |
| Mountaineers | 14 | 31 | 2 | 7 | 54 |

=== At Montana ===
| | 1 | 2 | 3 | 4 | Total |
|---|---|---|---|---|---|
| Tigers | 0 | 3 | 0 | 0 | 3 |
| Grizzlies | 14 | 21 | 14 | 7 | 56 |

=== Florida A&M ===
| | 1 | 2 | 3 | 4 | Total |
|---|---|---|---|---|---|
| Rattlers | 7 | 7 | 0 | 6 | 20 |
| Tigers | 7 | 0 | 0 | 7 | 14 |

=== At Bethune–Cookman ===
| | 1 | 2 | 3 | 4 | Total |
|---|---|---|---|---|---|
| Tigers | 0 | 2 | 3 | 7 | 12 |
| Wildcats | 7 | 3 | 7 | 7 | 24 |

=== Hampton ===
| | 1 | 2 | 3 | 4 | Total |
|---|---|---|---|---|---|
| Pirates | 7 | 0 | 3 | 7 | 17 |
| Tigers | 7 | 0 | 0 | 3 | 10 |

=== At Morgan State ===
| | 1 | 2 | 3 | 4 | Total |
|---|---|---|---|---|---|
| Tigers | 7 | 0 | 7 | 14 | 28 |
| Bears | 21 | 21 | 6 | 0 | 48 |

=== At Charleston Southern ===
| | 1 | 2 | 3 | 4 | Total |
|---|---|---|---|---|---|
| Tigers | 10 | 7 | 3 | 7 | 27 |
| Buccaneers | 14 | 17 | 14 | 7 | 52 |

=== At Norfolk State ===
| | 1 | 2 | 3 | 4 | Total |
|---|---|---|---|---|---|
| Tigers | 0 | 6 | 7 | 14 | 27 |
| Spartans | 6 | 0 | 0 | 3 | 9 |

=== Delaware State ===
| | 1 | 2 | 3 | 4 | Total |
|---|---|---|---|---|---|
| Hornets | 0 | 7 | 7 | 7 | 21 |
| Tigers | 14 | 7 | 7 | 7 | 35 |

=== At North Carolina A&T ===
| | 1 | 2 | 3 | 4 | Total |
|---|---|---|---|---|---|
| Tigers | 0 | 3 | 7 | 7 | 17 |
| Aggies | 7 | 6 | 13 | 10 | 36 |

=== South Carolina State ===
| | 1 | 2 | 3 | 4 | Total |
|---|---|---|---|---|---|
| Bulldogs | 7 | 0 | 3 | 0 | 10 |
| Tigers | 14 | 3 | 3 | 14 | 34 |
