= Darryl Johnson (American football) =

American football player (born 1997)

Profile
- Position: Linebacker

Personal information
- Born: April 4, 1997 (age 29); Kingsland, Georgia, U.S.
- Listed height: 6 ft 6 in (1.98 m)
- Listed weight: 253 lb (115 kg)

Career information
- High school: Camden County (Georgia)
- College: North Carolina A&T (2015–2018)
- NFL draft: 2019: 7th round, 225th overall pick

Career history
- Buffalo Bills (2019–2020); Carolina Panthers (2021); Seattle Seahawks (2022); San Francisco 49ers (2023)*; Arlington Renegades (2025)*
- * Offseason or practice squad member only

Awards and highlights
- MEAC Defensive Player of the Year (2018); 2× First-team All-MEAC (2017, 2018)

Career NFL statistics
- Total tackles: 34
- Sacks: 2
- Stats at Pro Football Reference

Darryl Johnson Jr. (born April 4, 1997) is an American professional football linebacker. He played college football at North Carolina A&T.

== Early life ==
Johnson grew up in Kingsland, Georgia. He committed to play college football at North Carolina A&T, which was the only school that gave him an offer following an injury during his high school senior year. In his final year with the Aggies, he racked up 55 total tackles (19 for a loss) and 10.5 sacks, earning the Mid-Eastern Athletic Conference defensive player of the year award. Johnson declared for the NFL draft following his redshirt junior year.

== Professional career ==
Pre-draft measurables
Height	Weight	Arm length	Hand span	40-yard dash	10-yard split	20-yard split	20-yard shuttle	Three-cone drill	Vertical jump	Broad jump	Bench press
6 ft 6 in (1.98 m)	253 lb (115 kg)	33 7/8 in (0.86 m)	10 in (0.25 m)	4.82 s	1.65 s	2.78 s	4.56 s	6.97 s	32.5 in (0.83 m)	9 ft 4 in (2.84 m)	20 reps
All values from NFL Combine/Pro Day

=== Buffalo Bills ===
Johnson was selected by the Buffalo Bills with the 225th overall pick in the seventh round of the 2019 NFL draft.

=== Carolina Panthers ===
On August 30, 2021, the Bills traded Johnson to the Carolina Panthers for a 2022 sixth round pick. He was placed on injured reserve on October 30, 2021 with a hamstring injury. He was activated on December 7.

On August 30, 2022, Johnson was waived by the Panthers.

=== Seattle Seahawks ===
On August 31, 2022, Johnson was claimed off waivers by the Seattle Seahawks. He suffered a foot injury in Week 4 and placed on injured reserve on October 7.

=== San Francisco 49ers ===
On June 6, 2023, Johnson signed with the San Francisco 49ers. He was placed on injured reserve on August 4, 2023. He was released on August 16.

=== Arlington Renegades ===
On July 29, 2024, Johnson signed with the Arlington Renegades of the United Football League (UFL). He was released on March 19, 2025.
