= 2017 Morgan State Bears football team =

American college football season

2017 Morgan State Bears football
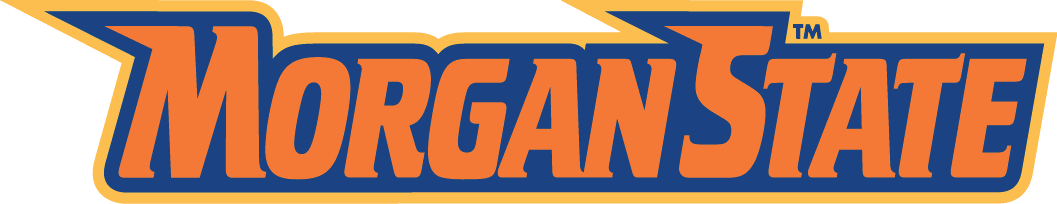
- Conference: Mid-Eastern Athletic Conference
- Record: 1–10 (1–7 MEAC)
- Head coach: Fred Farrier (2nd season)
- Offensive coordinator: Rob Spence (1st season)
- Defensive coordinator: Mike Fanoga (2nd season)
- Home stadium: Hughes Stadium

2017 Mid-Eastern Athletic Conference football standings
	Conf.			Overall
Team	W		L	W		L
No. 7 North Carolina A&T $	8	–	0	12	–	0
Howard	6	–	2	7	–	4
Bethune–Cookman	6	–	2	7	–	4
North Carolina Central	5	–	3	7	–	4
Hampton	5	–	3	6	–	5
Norfolk State	4	–	4	4	–	7
Savannah State *	3	–	5	3	–	8
South Carolina State	2	–	6	3	–	7
Florida A&M *	2	–	6	3	–	8
Delaware State	2	–	6	2	–	9
Morgan State *	1	–	7	1	–	10
$ – Conference champion; * Florida A&M, Morgan State and Savannah State ineligible for postseason due to APR violations; Rankings from STATS Poll

The 2017 Morgan State Bears football team represented Morgan State University as a member of the Mid-Eastern Athletic Conference (MEAC) during the 2017 NCAA Division I FCS football season. Led by Fred Farrier in his second and final season as head coach, the Bears compiled an overall record of 1–10 with a mark of 1–7 in conference play, placing last out of 11 teams in the MEAC. The team played home games at Hughes Stadium in Baltimore.

Before the season, Farrier was promoted to full-time head coach after serving as interim head coach in 2016. After the season, on December 18, he was dismissed and released from his contract. He finished his two-year stint as Morgan State's head coach with a record of 4–18.

== Schedule ==
Date	Time	Opponent	Site	TV	Result	Attendance
September 2	6:00 p.m.	at Towson*	Johnny Unitas Stadium; Towson, MD (The Battle for Greater Baltimore)	SPORTSfever TV, ESPN3	L 0–10	6,563
September 9	1:00 p.m.	Albany*	Hughes Stadium; Baltimore, MD	Facebook	L 0–26	3,789
September 16	3:30 p.m.	at Rutgers*	High Point Solutions Stadium; Piscataway, NJ	BTN	L 0–65	39,892
September 23	7:00 p.m.	No. 21 North Carolina A&T	Hughes Stadium; Baltimore, MD	Facebook	L 17–49	7,437
October 6	7:30 p.m.	at South Carolina State	Oliver C. Dawson Stadium; Orangeburg, SC	ESPNU	L 14–35	9,038
October 14	1:00 p.m.	Savannah State^{†}	Hughes Stadium; Baltimore, MD	SPORTSfever TV, ESPN3	W 48–28	11,865
October 21	1:00 p.m.	at Howard	William H. Greene Stadium; Washington, DC (rivalry)	SPORTSfever TV, ESPN3	L 14–39	2,700
October 28	1:00 p.m.	Florida A&M	Hughes Stadium; Baltimore, MD	SPORTSfever TV, ESPN3	L 31–34	2,589
November 4	4:00 p.m.	at Bethune–Cookman	Municipal Stadium; Daytona Beach, FL		L 28–41	5,261
November 11	2:00 p.m.	at Delaware State	Alumni Stadium; Dover, DE		L 30–33	1,334
November 18	1:00 p.m.	Norfolk State	Hughes Stadium; Baltimore, MD	Facebook	L 32–45	1,276
*Non-conference game; ^{†}Homecoming; Rankings from STATS Poll released prior to the game; All times are in Eastern time
