= 2017 Ivy League football season =

- League: NCAA Division I Football Championship Subdivision
- Sport: Football
- Duration: September 16, 2017 – November 18, 2017
- Teams: 8

Regular season
- Champions: Yale

Football seasons
- 2016 2018

2017 Ivy League football standings
	Conf.			Overall
Team	W		L	W		L
No. 24 Yale $	6	–	1	9	–	1
Columbia	5	–	2	8	–	2
Dartmouth	5	–	2	8	–	2
Penn	4	–	3	6	–	4
Harvard	3	–	4	5	–	5
Cornell	3	–	4	3	–	7
Princeton	2	–	5	5	–	5
Brown	0	–	7	2	–	8
$ – Conference champion; Rankings from STATS Poll

The 2017 Ivy League football season was the 62nd season of college football play for the Ivy League and was part of the 2017 NCAA Division I FCS football season. The season began on September 16, 2017, and ended on November 18, 2017. Ivy League teams were 18–6 against non-conference opponents and Yale won the conference championship.

== Season overview ==
Conf. Rank	Team	Head coach	STATS final	STATS high	Overall record	Conf. record	PPG	PAG
1	Yale	Tony Reno	24	24	9–1	6–1	35.5	15.6
2 (tie)	Columbia	Al Bagnoli	NR	NR	8–2	5–2	23.9	17.5
2 (tie)	Dartmouth	Buddy Teevens	NR	NR	8–2	5–2	27.4	20.0
4	Penn	Ray Priore	NR	NR	6–4	4–3	29.8	25.7
5 (tie)	Harvard	Tim Murphy	NR	NR	5–5	3–4	22.0	20.9
5 (tie)	Cornell	David Archer	NR	NR	3–7	3–4	17.3	24.3
7	Princeton	Bob Surace	NR	NR	5–5	2–5	38.2	26.5
8	Brown	Phil Estes	NR	NR	2–8	0–7	13.0	30.1

== Schedule ==
=== Week 1 ===
Date	Time	Visiting team	Home team	Site	TV	Result	Attendance	Ref.
September 16	12:00 p.m.	San Diego	Princeton	Princeton Stadium • Princeton, NJ		W 27–17	10,421	
September 16	12:30 p.m.	Yale	Lehigh	Goodman Stadium • Bethlehem, PA		W 56–28	4,996	
September 16	12:30 p.m.	Bryant	Brown	Brown Stadium • Providence, RI		W 28–23	3,770	
September 16	1:00 p.m.	Wagner	Columbia	Wien Stadium • New York City, NY		W 17–14	3,828	
September 16	1:00 p.m.	Harvard	Rhode Island	Meade Stadium • Kingston, RI		L 10–17	3,812	
September 16	1:00 p.m.	Ohio Dominican	Penn	Franklin Field • Philadelphia, PA		W 42–24	3,009	
September 16	3:30 p.m.	Cornell	Delaware	Delaware Stadium • Newark, DE		L 14–41	14,714	
September 16	6:00 p.m.	Dartmouth	Stetson	Spec Martin Stadium • DeLand, FL		W 38–7	2,435	
^{#}Rankings from STATS Poll. All times are in Eastern Time.

=== Week 2 ===
Date	Time	Visiting team	Home team	Site	TV	Result	Attendance	Ref.
September 23	12:00 p.m.	Brown	Harvard	Harvard Stadium • Boston, MA		HAR 45–28	10,651	
September 23	12:30 p.m.	Penn	Lehigh	Goodman Stadium • Bethlehem, PA		W 65–47	5,060	
September 23	1:00 p.m.	Georgetown	Columbia	Wien Stadium • New York City, NY		W 35–14	4,101	
September 23	1:00 p.m.	Cornell	Yale	Yale Bowl • New Haven, CT		YALE 49–24	10,926	
September 23	6:00 p.m.	Lafayette	Princeton	Princeton Stadium • Princeton, NJ		W 38–17	7,239	
September 23	7:00 p.m.	No. 25 Holy Cross	Dartmouth	Memorial Field • Hanover, NH		W 27–26 ^{OT}	7,094	
^{#}Rankings from STATS Poll. All times are in Eastern Time.

=== Week 3 ===
Date	Time	Visiting team	Home team	Site	TV	Result	Attendance	Ref.
September 29	7:00 p.m.	Dartmouth	Penn	Franklin Field • Philadelphia, PA		DART 16–13	4,023	
September 30	12:30 p.m.	Columbia	Princeton	Princeton Stadium • Princeton, NJ (Rivalry)		COL 28–24	5,073	
September 30	1:30 p.m.	Colgate	Cornell	Schoellkopf Field • Ithaca, NY (Rivalry)		L 7–21	3,325	
September 30	2:00 p.m.	Harvard	Georgetown	Cooper Field • Washington, D.C.		W 41–2	3,256	
September 30	6:00 p.m.	Yale	Fordham	Coffey Field • Bronx, NY		W 41–10	3,988	
September 30	7:00 p.m.	Rhode Island	Brown	Brown Stadium • Providence, RI (Rivalry)		W 24–21	3,191	
^{#}Rankings from STATS Poll. All times are in Eastern Time.

=== Week 4 ===
Date	Time	Visiting team	Home team	Site	TV	Result	Attendance	Ref.
October 7	12:00 p.m.	Columbia	Marist	Leonidoff Field • Poughkeepsie, NY		W 41–17	2,396	
October 7	1:00 p.m.	Brown	Stetson	Spec Martin Stadium • DeLand, FL		L 13–17	1,689	
October 7	1:00 p.m.	Penn	Central Connecticut	Arute Field • New Britain, CT		L 21–42	4,917	
October 7	1:00 p.m.	Georgetown	Princeton	Princeton Stadium • Princeton, NJ		W 50–30	4,466	
October 7	1:30 p.m.	Harvard	Cornell	Schoellkopf Field • Ithaca, NY		COR 17–14	7,313	
October 7†	1:30 p.m.	Yale	Dartmouth	Memorial Field • Hanover, NH (Rivalry)		DART 28–27	8,114	
^{#}Rankings from STATS Poll. All times are in Eastern Time.

=== Week 5 ===
Date	Time	Visiting team	Home team	Site	TV	Result	Attendance	Ref.
October 14	12:00 p.m.	Lafayette	Harvard	Harvard Stadium • Boston, MA		W 38–10	10,025	
October 14	12:30 p.m.	Princeton	Brown	Brown Stadium • Providence, RI (Rivalry)		PRIN 53–0	3,028	
October 14	1:00 p.m.	Dartmouth	Sacred Heart	Campus Field • Fairfield, CT		W 29–26	5,569	
October 14	1:00 p.m.	Holy Cross	Yale	Yale Bowl • New Haven, CT		W 32–0	8,709	
October 14†	1:30 p.m.	Penn	Columbia	Wien Stadium • New York City, NY (Rivalry)		COL 34–31 ^{OT}	13,081	
October 14	1:30 p.m.	Bucknell	Cornell	Schoellkopf Field • Ithaca, NY		L 18–26	4,202	
^{#}Rankings from STATS Poll. All times are in Eastern Time.

=== Week 6 ===
Date	Time	Visiting team	Home team	Site	TV	Result	Attendance	Ref.
October 20	7:30 p.m.	Princeton	Harvard	Harvard Stadium • Boston, MA (Rivalry)		PRIN 52–17	10,114	
October 21	12:30 p.m.	Columbia	Dartmouth	Memorial Field • Hanover, NH		COL 22–17	5,237	
October 21	1:00 p.m.	Yale	Penn	Franklin Field • Philadelphia, PA (Rivalry)		YALE 24–19	6,408	
October 21†	3:00 p.m.	Brown	Cornell	Schoellkopf Field • Ithaca, NY		COR 34–7	13,514	
^{#}Rankings from STATS Poll. All times are in Eastern Time.

=== Week 7 ===
Date	Time	Visiting team	Home team	Site	TV	Result	Attendance	Ref.
October 28	12:00 p.m.	Dartmouth	Harvard	Harvard Stadium • Boston, MA (Rivalry)		HAR 25–22	11,143	
October 28	12:30 p.m.	Penn	Brown	Brown Stadium • Providence, RI (Rivalry)		PENN 17–7	2,008	
October 28	1:00 p.m.	Columbia	Yale	Yale Bowl • New Haven, CT		YALE 23–6	15,422	
October 28	7:00 p.m.	Cornell	Princeton	Princeton Stadium • Princeton, NJ		COR 29–28	5,642	
^{#}Rankings from STATS Poll. All times are in Eastern Time.

=== Week 8 ===
Date	Time	Visiting team	Home team	Site	TV	Result	Attendance	Ref.
November 3	8:00 p.m.	Brown	Yale	Yale Bowl • New Haven, CT		YALE 34–7	8,216	
November 4	1:00 p.m.	Harvard	Columbia	Wien Stadium • New York City, NY (Rivalry)		HAR 21–14	7,011	
November 4†	1:00 p.m.	Princeton	Penn	Franklin Field • Philadelphia, PA (Rivalry)		PENN 38–35	9,073	
November 4	1:30 p.m.	Cornell	Dartmouth	Memorial Field • Hanover, NH (Rivalry)		DART 10–0	4,033	
^{#}Rankings from STATS Poll. All times are in Eastern Time.

=== Week 9 ===
Date	Time	Visiting team	Home team	Site	TV	Result	Attendance	Ref.
November 10	8:00 p.m.	Dartmouth	Brown	Fenway Park • Boston, MA		DART 33–10	12,297	
November 11	12:00 p.m.	Penn	Harvard	Harvard Stadium • Boston, MA (Rivalry)		PENN 23–6	10,122	
November 11	1:00 p.m.	Yale	Princeton	Princeton Stadium • Princeton, NJ (Rivalry)		YALE 35–31	11,229	
November 11	1:30 p.m.	Columbia	Cornell	Schoellkopf Field • Ithaca, NY (Empire State Bowl)		COL 18–8	5,613	
^{#}Rankings from STATS Poll. All times are in Eastern Time.

=== Week 10 ===
Date	Time	Visiting team	Home team	Site	TV	Result	Attendance	Ref.
November 18	12:30 p.m.	Harvard	Yale	Yale Bowl • New Haven, CT (134th The Game)		YALE 24–3	51,426	
November 18	1:00 p.m.	Brown	Columbia	Wien Stadium • New York City, NY		COL 24–6	5,341	
November 18	1:30 p.m.	Cornell	Penn	Franklin Field • Philadelphia, PA (Trustees' Cup)		PENN 29–22	3,861	
November 18	1:30 p.m.	Princeton	Dartmouth	Memorial Field • Hanover, NH		DART 54–44	3,081	
^{#}Rankings from STATS Poll. All times are in Eastern Time.

== Attendance ==
Team	Stadium	Capacity	Game 1	Game 2	Game 3	Game 4	Game 5	Total	Average	% of Capacity
Brown	Brown Stadium	20,000	3,770†	3,191	3,028	2,008	—	11,997	3,000	15.0%
Columbia	Wien Stadium	17,000	3,828	4,101	13,081†	7,011	5,341	33,362	6,673	39.3%
Cornell	Schoellkopf Field	25,597	3,325	7,313	4,202	13,514†	5,613	33,967	6,794	26.5%
Dartmouth	Memorial Field	11,000	7,094	8,114†	5,237	4,033	3,081	27,559	5,512	50.1%
Harvard	Harvard Stadium	30,323	10,651	10,025	10,114	11,143†	10,122	52,055	10,411	34.3%
Penn	Franklin Field	52,958	3,009	4,023	6,408	9,073†	3,861	26,374	5,275	10.0%
Princeton	Princeton Stadium	27,773	10,421	5,073	4,466	5,642	11,229†	36,831	7,367	26.5%
Yale	Yale Bowl	61,446	10,926	8,709	15,422	8,216	51,426†	94,699	18,940	30.8%
Total	—	246,097	53,024	50,549	61,958	60,640	90,673	316,844	63,972	26.0%

†Season High

== NFL draft ==
The following list includes all Ivy League players who were drafted in the 2018 NFL draft.

Round #	Pick #	NFL team	Player	Position	College
5	144	Tampa Bay Buccaneers	Justin Watson	WR	Penn
6	200	Atlanta Falcons	Foyesade Oluokun	S	Yale
