= 2017 Princeton Tigers football team =

American college football season

2017 Princeton Tigers football
- Conference: Ivy League
- Record: 5–5 (2–5 Ivy)
- Head coach: Bob Surace (8th season)
- Offensive coordinator: Sean Gleeson (1st season)
- Offensive scheme: Spread option
- Defensive coordinator: Steve Verbit (5th season)
- Base defense: 4–2–5
- Home stadium: Powers Field at Princeton Stadium

2017 Ivy League football standings
	Conf.			Overall
Team	W		L	W		L
No. 24 Yale $	6	–	1	9	–	1
Columbia	5	–	2	8	–	2
Dartmouth	5	–	2	8	–	2
Penn	4	–	3	6	–	4
Harvard	3	–	4	5	–	5
Cornell	3	–	4	3	–	7
Princeton	2	–	5	5	–	5
Brown	0	–	7	2	–	8
$ – Conference champion; Rankings from STATS Poll

The 2017 Princeton Tigers football team represented Princeton University in the 2017 NCAA Division I FCS football season. They were led by eighth-year head coach Bob Surace and played their home games at Powers Field at Princeton Stadium. Princeton is a member of the Ivy League. They finished the season 5–5 overall and 2–5 in Ivy League play to place seventh. Princeton averaged 7,366 fans per game.

== Schedule ==
The 2017 schedule consisted of six home games and four away games. The Tigers hosted Ivy League foes Columbia, Cornell, and Yale, and traveled to Brown, Harvard, Penn, and Dartmouth.

Princeton's non-conference opponents were San Diego of the Pioneer Football League and Lafayette and Georgetown of the Patriot League.

Date	Time	Opponent	Site	TV	Result	Attendance
September 16	12:00 p.m.	San Diego*	Powers Field at Princeton Stadium; Princeton, NJ	ELVN	W 27–17	10,421
September 23	6:00 p.m.	at Lafayette*	Fisher Stadium; Easton, PA	STADIUM	W 38–17	7,239
September 30	12:30 p.m.	Columbia	Powers Field at Princeton Stadium; Princeton, NJ	ELVN	L 24–28	5,073
October 7	1:00 p.m.	Georgetown*	Powers Field at Princeton Stadium; Princeton, NJ		W 50–30	4,466
October 14	12:30 p.m.	at Brown	Brown Stadium; Providence, RI		W 53–0	3,028
October 20	7:30 p.m.	at Harvard	Harvard Stadium; Boston, MA (rivalry)	NBCSN	W 52–17	10,114
October 28	7:00 p.m.	Cornell	Powers Field at Princeton Stadium; Princeton, NJ	NBCSN	L 28–29	5,642
November 4	1:00 p.m.	at Penn	Franklin Field; Philadelphia, PA (rivalry)	TCN	L 35–38	9,073
November 11	1:00 p.m.	Yale	Powers Field at Princeton Stadium; Princeton, NJ (rivalry)	ELVN	L 31–35	11,229
November 18	1:30 p.m.	at Dartmouth	Memorial Field; Hanover, NH		L 44–54	3,081
*Non-conference game; All times are in Eastern time

== Game summaries ==
=== San Diego ===
San Diego vs. Princeton – Game summary

Quarter	1	2	3	4	Total
San Diego	0	10	0	7	17
Princeton	6	8	6	7	27

at Powers Field at Princeton Stadium • Princeton, NJ

- Date: September 16
- Game time: Noon
- Game weather: 78 °F (26 °C); beautiful
- Game attendance: 10,421
- Referee: C. Jebran
- Box Score

Game information

First quarter
Second quarter
Third quarter
Fourth quarter

=== Lafayette ===
Princeton vs. Lafayette – Game summary

Quarter	1	2	3	4	Total
Princeton	3	21	7	7	38
Lafayette	7	3	0	7	17

at Fisher Stadium • Easton, PA

- Date: September 23
- Game time: 6:00 p.m.
- Game weather: 80 °F (27 °C); clear
- Game attendance: 7,239
- Referee: W. Gillis
- Box Score

Game information

First quarter
Second quarter
Third quarter
Fourth quarter

=== Columbia ===
Columbia vs. Princeton – Game summary

Quarter	1	2	3	4	Total
Columbia	7	7	7	7	28
Princeton	7	7	3	7	24

at Powers Field at Princeton Stadium • Princeton, NJ

- Date: September 30
- Game time: 12:30 p.m.
- Game weather: 64 °F (18 °C); cloudy, windy
- Game attendance: 5,073
- Referee: S. Cadorette
- Box Score

Game information

First quarter

- PRIN – Jesper Horsted, 9 yard pass from Chad Kanoff (Tavish Rice XP good), 11:42 (PRIN 7–0)
- COL – R. Smith II, 46 yard pass from Anders Hill (Oren Milstein XP good), 6:29 (TIE 7–7)

Second quarter

- PRIN – Horsted, 12 yard pass from Kanoff (Rice XP good), 8:21 (PRIN 14–7)
- COL – Tanner Thomas, 11 yard run (Milstein XP good), 3:16 (TIE 14–14)

Third quarter

- COL – Josh Bean, 2 yard run (Milstein XP good), 12:09 (COL 21–14)
- PRIN – Rice, 26 yard field goal, 3:27 (COL 21–17)

Fourth quarter

- PRIN – S. Carlson, 27 yard pass from Kanoff, 2:48 (PRIN 24–21)
- COL – Smith II, 63 yard pass from Hill (Milstein XP good), 1:12 (COL 28–24)

=== Georgetown ===
Georgetown vs. Princeton – Game summary

Quarter	1	2	3	4	Total
Georgetown	10	0	6	14	30
Princeton	17	19	14	0	50

at Powers Field at Princeton Stadium • Princeton, NJ

- Date: October 7
- Game time: 1:00 p.m.
- Game weather: 81 °F (27 °C); warm, breezy
- Game attendance: 4,466
- Referee: T. Kichline
- Box Score

Game information

First quarter
Second quarter
Third quarter
Fourth quarter

=== Brown ===
Princeton vs. Brown – Game summary

Quarter	1	2	3	4	Total
Princeton	16	20	10	7	53
Brown	0	0	0	0	0

at Brown Stadium • Providence, RI

- Date: October 14
- Game time: 12:30 p.m.
- Game weather: 63 °F (17 °C); light rain
- Game attendance: 3,028
- Referee: T. Marcella
- Box Score

Game information

First quarter
Second quarter
Third quarter
Fourth quarter

=== Harvard ===
Princeton vs. Harvard – Game summary

Quarter	1	2	3	4	Total
Princeton	10	21	14	7	52
Harvard	0	10	0	7	17

at Harvard Stadium • Boston, MA

- Date: October 20
- Game time: 7:30 p.m.
- Game weather: 65 °F (18 °C); warm, breezy
- Game attendance: 10,114
- Referee: M. Sechrist
- TV: NBCSN
- Box Score

Game information

First quarter
Second quarter
Third quarter
Fourth quarter

=== Cornell ===
Cornell vs. Princeton – Game summary

Quarter	1	2	3	4	Total
Cornell	0	10	6	13	29
Princeton	7	14	7	0	28

at Powers Field at Princeton Stadium • Princeton, NJ

- Date: October 28
- Game time: 7:00 p.m.
- Game attendance: 5,642
- Referee: W. Boyd
- TV: NBCSN
- Box Score

Game information

First quarter

- PRIN – Chad Kanoff, 14 yard run (Tavish Rice XP good), 5:58 (PRIN 7–0)

Second quarter

- COR – Hayes Nolte, 12 yard pass from Dalton Banks (Nickolas Null XP good), 14:34 (TIE 7–7)
- PRIN – S. Carlson, 23 yard pass from Kanoff (Rice XP good), 11:47 (PRIN 14–7)
- PRIN – Carlson, 20 yard pass from Kanoff (Rice XP good), 4:58 (PRIN 21–7)
- COR – Null, 23 yard field goal, 0:14 (PRIN 21–10)

Third quarter

- COR – Chris Walker, 1 yard run (2-pt. conversion failed), 8:42 (PRIN 21–16)
- PRIN – Ryan Quigley, 7 yard run (Rice XP good), 1:37 (PRIN 28–16)

Fourth quarter

- COR – Null, 28 yard field goal, 11:00 (PRIN 28–19)
- COR – Jake Jatis, 8 yard run (Null XP good), 7:13 (PRIN 28–26)
- COR – Null, 43 yard field goal, 0:48 (COR 29–28)

=== Penn ===
Princeton vs. Penn – Game summary

Quarter	1	2	3	4	Total
Princeton	7	0	14	14	35
Penn	7	10	7	14	38

at Franklin Field • Philadelphia, PA

- Date: November 4
- Game time: 1:00 p.m.
- Game weather: About 55 °F (13 °C); brisk fall day
- Game attendance: 9,073
- Referee: C. Jebran
- Box Score

Game information

First quarter
Second quarter
Third quarter
Fourth quarter

=== Yale ===
Yale vs. Princeton – Game summary

Quarter	1	2	3	4	Total
Yale	0	14	14	7	35
Princeton	7	17	7	0	31

at Powers Field at Princeton Stadium • Princeton, NJ

- Date: November 11
- Game time: 1:00 p.m.
- Game weather: 37 °F (3 °C); cold, clear
- Game attendance: 11,229
- Referee: M. Sechris
- Box Score

Game information

First quarter
Second quarter
Third quarter
Fourth quarter

=== Dartmouth ===
Princeton vs. Dartmouth – Game summary

Quarter	1	2	3	4	Total
Princeton	6	7	14	17	44
Dartmouth	3	17	0	34	54

at Memorial Field • Hanover, NH

- Date: November 18
- Game time: 1:30 p.m.
- Game weather: 43 °F (6 °C); cold and overcast
- Game attendance: 3,081
- Referee: T. Marcella
- Box Score

Game information

First quarter
Second quarter
Third quarter
Fourth quarter
