= 2017 Dartmouth Big Green football team =

American college football season

2017 Dartmouth Big Green football
- Conference: Ivy League
- Record: 8–2 (5–2 Ivy)
- Head coach: Buddy Teevens (18th season)
- Offensive coordinator: Kevin Daft (1st season)
- Offensive scheme: Option
- Defensive coordinator: Don Dobes (8th season)
- Base defense: 4–3
- Home stadium: Memorial Field

2017 Ivy League football standings
	Conf.			Overall
Team	W		L	W		L
No. 24 Yale $	6	–	1	9	–	1
Columbia	5	–	2	8	–	2
Dartmouth	5	–	2	8	–	2
Penn	4	–	3	6	–	4
Harvard	3	–	4	5	–	5
Cornell	3	–	4	3	–	7
Princeton	2	–	5	5	–	5
Brown	0	–	7	2	–	8
$ – Conference champion; Rankings from STATS Poll

The 2017 Dartmouth Big Green football team represented Dartmouth College in the 2017 NCAA Division I FCS football season. The Big Green were led by head coach Buddy Teevens in his 13th straight year and 18th overall. They played their home games at Memorial Field. They were a member of the Ivy League. They finished the season 8–2 overall and 5–2 in Ivy League play to a tie for second place. Dartmouth averaged 6,642 fans per game.

== Schedule ==
The 2017 schedule consisted of five home games, four away games, and one game against Brown at Fenway Park in Boston. The Big Green hosted Ivy League foes Yale, Columbia, Cornell, and Princeton, and traveled to Penn and Harvard.

Dartmouth's non-conference opponents were Stetson of the Pioneer Football League, Holy Cross of the Patriot League, and Sacred Heart of the Northeast Conference. Homecoming coincided with the game against Yale on October 7.

Date	Time	Opponent	Site	TV	Result	Attendance
September 16	6:00 p.m.	at Stetson*	Spec Martin Stadium; DeLand, FL	ESPN3	W 38–7	2,435
September 23	7:00 p.m.	No. 25 Holy Cross*	Memorial Field; Hanover, NH		W 27–26 ^{OT}	7,094
September 29	7:00 p.m.	at Penn	Franklin Field; Philadelphia, PA	NBCSN	W 16–13	4,023
October 7	1:30 p.m.	Yale^{†}	Memorial Field; Hanover, NH	ESPN3	W 28–27	8,114
October 14	1:00 p.m.	at Sacred Heart*	Campus Field; Fairfield, CT		W 29–26	5,569
October 21	12:30 p.m.	Columbia	Memorial Field; Hanover, NH	ELVN	L 17–22	5,237
October 28	12:00 p.m.	at Harvard	Harvard Stadium; Boston, MA (rivalry)	NESN	L 22–25	11,143
November 4	1:30 p.m.	Cornell	Memorial Field; Hanover, NH (rivalry)		W 10–0	4,033
November 10	8:00 p.m.	vs. Brown	Fenway Park; Boston, MA	NBCSN	W 33–10	12,297
November 18	1:30 p.m.	Princeton	Memorial Field; Hanover, NH		W 54–44	3,081
*Non-conference game; ^{†}Homecoming; Rankings from STATS Poll released prior to the game; All times are in Eastern time

== Game summaries ==
=== Stetson ===
Dartmouth vs. Stetson – Game summary

Quarter	1	2	3	4	Total
Dartmouth	0	10	21	7	38
Stetson	0	7	0	0	7

at Spec Martin Stadium • DeLand, FL

- Date: September 16
- Game time: 6:00 p.m.
- Game weather: 87 °F (31 °C); muggy, partly cloudy
- Game attendance: 2,435
- Referee: J. Page
- Box Score

Game information

Second quarter

- DART – Rashaad Cooper, 10 yard run (David Smith XP good), 10:01 (DART 7–0)
- STET – Justin Jordan, 6 yard pass from Colin McGovern (Jonny Messina XP good), 4:22 (TIE 7–7)
- DART – Smith, 25 yard field goal, 0:17 (DART 10–7)

Third quarter

- DART – Jared Gerbino, 1 yard run (Smith XP good), 11:13 (DART 17–7)
- DART – Cam Poole, 5 yard pass from Jack Heneghan (Smith XP good), 7:30 (DART 24–7)
- DART – D.J. Avery, 30 yard interception return (Smith XP good), 3:06 (DART 31–7)

Fourth quarter

- DART – Matthew Shearin, 16 yard run (Smith XP good), 9:47 (DART 38–7)

=== #25 Holy Cross ===
Holy Cross vs. Dartmouth – Game summary

Quarter	1	2	3	4	OT	Total
No. 25 Holy Cross	0	14	0	6	6	26
Dartmouth	7	6	7	0	7	27

at Memorial Field • Hanover, NH

- Date: September 23
- Game time: 7:00 p.m.
- Game weather: 82 °F (28 °C); unseasonably warm
- Game attendance: 7,094
- Referee: M. Overton
- Box Score

Game information

First quarter

- DART – Emory Thompson, 22 yard pass from Jack Heneghan (David Smith XP good), 5:43 (DART 7–0)

Second quarter

- HC – Blaise Bell, 7 yard pass from Peter Pujals (A.J. Wells XP good), 14:52 (TIE 7–7)
- DART – Smith, 42 yard field goal, 11:50 (DART 10–7)
- HC – Miles Alexander, 7 yard run (Wells XP good), 3:12 (HC 14–10)
- DART – Smith, 35 yard field goal, 0:00 (HC 14–13)

Third quarter

- DART – Ryder Stone, 44 yard run (Smith XP good), 0:45 (DART 20–14)

Fourth quarter

- HC – Bell, 6 yard pass from Pujals (Wells XP blocked), 0:03 (TIE 20–20)

Overtime

- DART – Stephen Johnston, 10 yard pass from Heneghan (Smith XP good) (DART 27–20)
- HC – Diquan Walker, 1 yard run (2-pt. conversion attempt failed) (DART 27–26)

=== Penn ===
Penn vs. Dartmouth – Game summary

Quarter	1	2	3	4	Total
Penn	0	7	3	3	13
Dartmouth	0	10	0	6	16

at Memorial Field • Hanover, NH

- Date: September 30
- Game time: 7:00 p.m.
- Game attendance: 4,023
- Box Score

Game information

Second quarter

- DART – Hunter Hagdorn, 12 yard pass from Jack Heneghan (David Smith XP good), 13:06 (DART 7–0)
- PENN – Justin Watson, 6 yard pass from Fischer-Colbrie (Jack Soslow XP good), 1:20 (TIE 7–7)
- DART – Smith, 43 yard field goal, 0:00 (DART 10–7)

Third quarter

- PENN – Soslow, 31 yard field goal, 0:30 (TIE 10–10)

Fourth quarter

- PENN – Soslow, 27 yard field goal, 5:37 (PENN 13–10)
- DART – Jared Gerbino, 1 yard run, 0:00 (DART 16–13)

=== Yale ===
Yale vs. Dartmouth – Game summary

Quarter	1	2	3	4	Total
Yale	7	17	3	0	27
Dartmouth	0	7	7	14	28

at Memorial Field • Hanover, NH

- Date: October 7
- Game time: 1:30 p.m.
- Game weather: 50 °F (10 °C); overcast
- Game attendance: 8,114
- Referee: W. Gillis
- Box Score

Game information

First quarter

- YALE – C. Williams-Lopez, 46 yard pass from Kurt Rawlings (Alex Galland XP good), 3:59 (YALE 7–0)

Second quarter

- YALE – Melvin Rouse II, 4 yard pass from Rawlings (Galland XP good), 14:14 (YALE 14–0)
- YALE – Zane Dudek, 22 yard pass from Rawlings (Galland XP good), 7:39 (YALE 21–0)
- DART – Isiah Swann, 47 yard interception return (David Smith XP good), 2:24 (YALE 21–7)
- YALE – Galland, 29 yard field goal, 0:00 (YALE 24–7)

Third quarter

- DART – Drew Hunnicut, 30 yard pass from Jack Heneghan (Smith XP good), 12:18 (YALE 24–14)
- YALE – Galland, 20 yard field goal, 6:07 (YALE 27–14)

Fourth quarter

- DART – Dylan Mellor, 40 yard pass from Heneghan (Smith XP good), 6:10 (YALE 27–21)
- DART – Hunnicut, 15 yard pass from Heneghan (Smith XP good), 0:34 (DART 28–27)

=== Sacred Heart ===
Dartmouth vs. Sacred Heart – Game summary

Quarter	1	2	3	4	Total
Dartmouth	14	0	7	8	29
Sacred Heart	7	16	3	0	26

at Campus Field • Fairfield, CT

- Date: October 14
- Game time: 1:00 p.m.
- Game weather: 69 °F (21 °C); cloudy
- Game attendance: 5,569
- Referee: J. DeAngulo
- Box Score

Game information

First quarter
Second quarter
Third quarter
Fourth quarter

=== Columbia ===
Columbia vs. Dartmouth – Game summary

Quarter	1	2	3	4	Total
Columbia	3	13	6	10	32
Dartmouth	0	0	7	10	17

at Memorial Field • Hanover, CT

- Date: October 21
- Game time: 12:30 p.m.
- Game weather: 66 °F (19 °C); sunny and warm
- Game attendance: 5,237
- Referee: H. Johns
- Box Score

Game information

First quarter
Second quarter
Third quarter
Fourth quarter

=== Harvard ===
Dartmouth vs. Harvard – Game summary

Quarter	1	2	3	4	Total
Dartmouth	7	7	0	8	22
Harvard	0	6	6	13	25

at Harvard Stadium • Boston, MA

- Date: October 28
- Game time: Noon
- Game weather: 65 °F (18 °C); mostly sunny
- Game attendance: 11,143
- Referee: H. Wimberg
- Box Score

Game information

First quarter
Second quarter
Third quarter
Fourth quarter

=== Cornell ===
Cornell vs. Dartmouth – Game summary

Quarter	1	2	3	4	Total
Cornell	0	0	0	0	0
Dartmouth	7	0	0	3	10

at Memorial Field • Hanover, NH

- Date: November 4
- Game time: 1:30 p.m.
- Game weather: 45 °F (7 °C); sunny
- Game attendance: 4,033
- Referee: S. Cadorette
- Box Score

Game information

First quarter

- DART – Hunter Hagdorn, 23 yard pass from Jack Heneghan (David Smith XP good), 6:22 (DART 7–0)

Fourth quarter

- DART – Smith, 33 yard field goal, 1:19 (DART 10–0)

=== Brown ===
Dartmouth vs. Brown – Game summary

Quarter	1	2	3	4	Total
Dartmouth	6	17	7	3	33
Brown	0	3	0	7	10

at Fenway Park • Boston, MA

- Date: November 10
- Game time: 8:00 p.m.
- Game weather: 27 °F (−3 °C); clear and cold
- Game attendance: 12,297
- Referee: J. Gray
- Box Score

Game information

First quarter
Second quarter
Third quarter
Fourth quarter

=== Princeton ===
Princeton vs. Dartmouth – Game summary

Quarter	1	2	3	4	Total
Princeton	6	7	14	17	44
Dartmouth	3	17	0	34	54

at Memorial Field • Hanover, NH

- Date: November 18
- Game time: 1:30 p.m.
- Game weather: 43 °F (6 °C); cold and overcast
- Game attendance: 3,081
- Referee: T. Marcella
- Box Score

Game information

First quarter
Second quarter
Third quarter
Fourth quarter
