= 2017 Brown Bears football team =

American college football season

2017 Brown Bears football

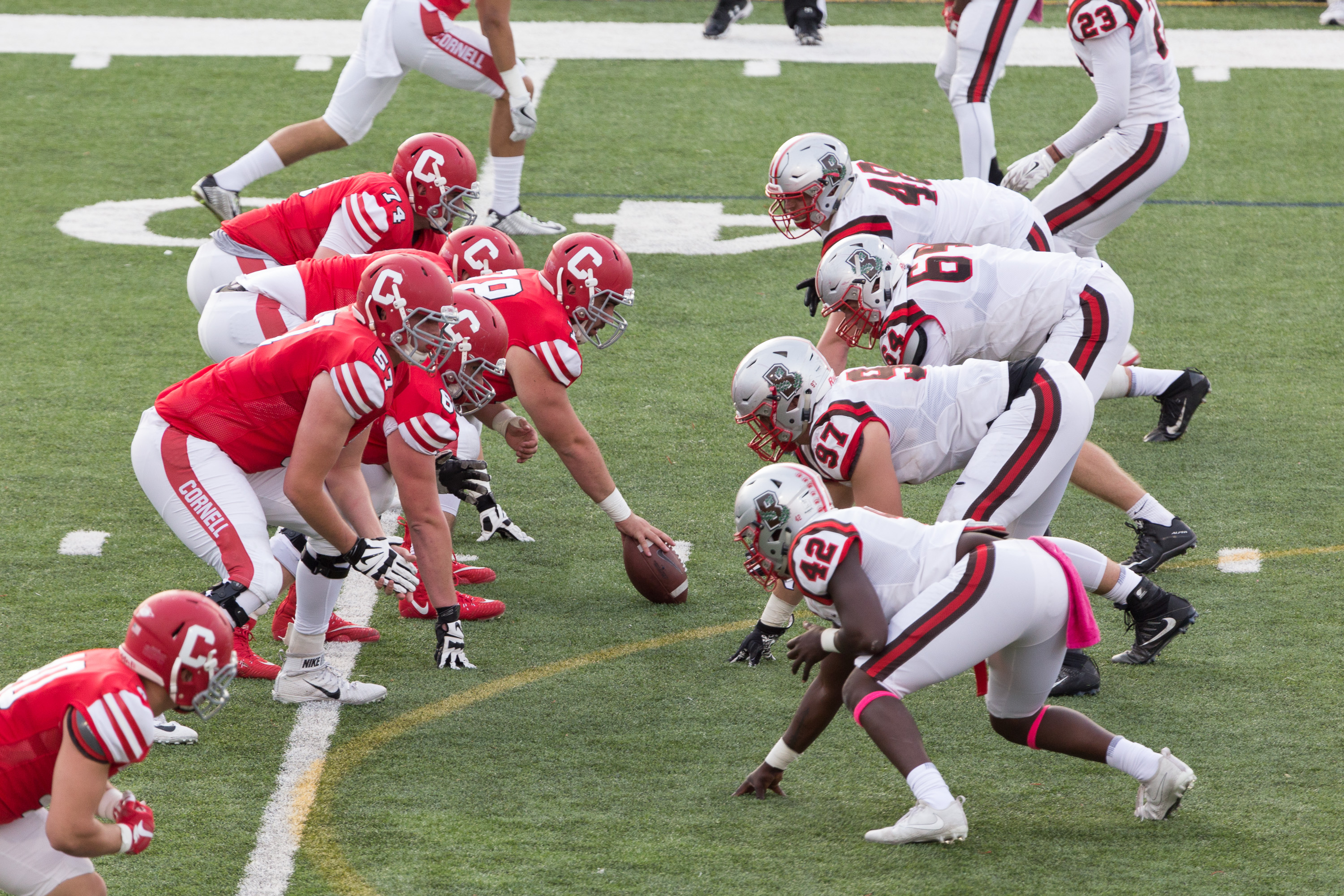
- Brown vs. Cornell, October 21
- Conference: Ivy League
- Record: 2–8 (0–7 Ivy)
- Head coach: Phil Estes (20th season)
- Offensive coordinator: Frank Sheehan (12th season)
- Offensive scheme: Pro-style
- Defensive coordinator: Michael Kelleher (17th season)
- Base defense: 4–3
- Home stadium: Brown Stadium

2017 Ivy League football standings
	Conf.			Overall
Team	W		L	W		L
No. 24 Yale $	6	–	1	9	–	1
Columbia	5	–	2	8	–	2
Dartmouth	5	–	2	8	–	2
Penn	4	–	3	6	–	4
Harvard	3	–	4	5	–	5
Cornell	3	–	4	3	–	7
Princeton	2	–	5	5	–	5
Brown	0	–	7	2	–	8
$ – Conference champion; Rankings from STATS Poll

The 2017 Brown Bears football team represented Brown University as a member of the Ivy League during the 2017 NCAA Division I FCS football season. Led by 20th-year head coach Phil Estes, the Bears compiled an overall record of 2–8 with a mark of 0–7 in conference play, placing last out of eight teams in the Ivy League. Brown played home games at Brown Stadium in Providence, Rhode Island.

== Schedule ==
The 2017 schedule consisted of four home games, five away games, and one game against Dartmouth at Fenway Park in Boston. The Bears hosted Ivy League foes Princeton and Penn, and traveled to Harvard, Cornell, and Columbia.

As in 2016, Brown's non-conference opponents were Bryant of the Northeast Conference, Rhode Island of the Colonial Athletic Association, and Stetson of the Pioneer Football League.

Date	Time	Opponent	Site	TV	Result	Attendance
September 16	12:30 p.m.	Bryant*	Brown Stadium; Providence, RI	ILDN	W 28–23	3,770
September 23	12:00 p.m.	at Harvard	Harvard Stadium; Boston, MA	NESN+	L 28–45	10,651
September 30	12:30 p.m.	Rhode Island*	Brown Stadium; Providence, RI (rivalry)	ILN	W 24–21	3,191
October 7	12:30 p.m.	at Stetson*	Spec Martin Stadium; DeLand, FL	ESPN3	L 13–17	1,689
October 14	12:30 p.m.	Princeton	Brown Stadium; Providence, RI	ILN	L 0–53	3,028
October 21	3:00 p.m.	at Cornell	Schoellkopf Field; Ithaca, NY	ILN	L 7–34	13,514
October 28	12:30 p.m.	Penn	Brown Stadium; Providence, RI	ELVN	L 7–17	2,008
November 3	8:00 p.m.	at Yale	Yale Bowl; New Haven, CT	NBCSN	L 7–34	8,216
November 10	8:00 p.m.	vs. Dartmouth	Fenway Park; Boston, MA	NBCSN	L 10–33	12,297
November 18	1:00 p.m.	at Columbia	Robert K. Kraft Field at Lawrence A. Wien Stadium; New York, NY	SNY	L 6–24	5,341
*Non-conference game; All times are in Eastern time

== Game summaries ==
=== Bryant ===
Bryant vs. Brown – Game summary

Quarter	1	2	3	4	Total
Bryant	3	7	7	6	23
Brown	7	7	14	0	28

at Brown Stadium • Providence, RI

- Date: September 16
- Game time: 12:30 p.m.
- Game weather: 80 °F (27 °C); mostly sunny, muggy
- Game attendance: 3,770
- Referee: H. Johns
- Box Score

Game information

First quarter
Second quarter
Third quarter
Fourth quarter

=== Harvard ===
Brown vs. Harvard – Game summary

Quarter	1	2	3	4	Total
Brown	2	0	0	26	28
Harvard	14	7	17	7	45

at Harvard Stadium • Boston, MA

- Date: September 23
- Game time: Noon
- Game weather: 70 °F (21 °C); partly cloudy
- Game attendance: 10,651
- Referee: C. Jebran
- Box Score

Game information

First quarter
Second quarter
Third quarter
Fourth quarter

=== Rhode Island ===
Rhode Island vs. Brown – Game summary

Quarter	1	2	3	4	Total
Rhode Island	7	7	0	7	21
Brown	3	0	21	0	24

at Brown Stadium • Providence, RI

- Date: September 30
- Game time: 7:00 p.m.
- Game weather: 55 °F (13 °C); overcast, cool
- Game attendance: 3,191
- Referee: T. Kichline
- Box Score

Game information

First quarter
Second quarter
Third quarter
Fourth quarter

=== Stetson ===
Brown vs. Stetson – Game summary

Quarter	1	2	3	4	Total
Brown	0	7	0	6	13
Stetson	3	7	7	0	17

at Spec Martin Stadium • DeLand, FL

- Date: October 7
- Game time: 12:30 p.m.
- Game weather: 87 °F (31 °C)
- Game attendance: 1,689
- Referee: G. Waybright
- Box Score

Game information

First quarter
Second quarter
Third quarter
Fourth quarter

=== Princeton ===
Princeton vs. Brown – Game summary

Quarter	1	2	3	4	Total
Princeton	16	20	10	7	53
Brown	0	0	0	0	0

at Brown Stadium • Providence, RI

- Date: October 14
- Game time: 12:30 p.m.
- Game weather: 63 °F (17 °C); light rain
- Game attendance: 3,028
- Referee: T. Marcella
- Box Score

Game information

First quarter
Second quarter
Third quarter
Fourth quarter

=== Cornell ===
Brown vs. Cornell – Game summary

Quarter	1	2	3	4	Total
Brown	0	0	0	7	7
Cornell	3	10	7	14	34

at Schoellkopf Field • Ithaca, NY

- Date: October 21
- Game time: 3:00 p.m.
- Game weather: 73 °F (23 °C); partly cloudy, warm
- Game attendance: 13,514
- Referee: C. Bloh
- [Box Score]

Game information

First quarter
Second quarter
Third quarter
Fourth quarter

=== Penn ===
Penn vs. Brown – Game summary

Quarter	1	2	3	4	Total
Penn	14	3	0	0	17
Brown	7	0	0	0	7

at Brown Stadium • Providence, RI

- Date: October 28
- Game time: 12:30 p.m.
- Game weather: 66 °F (19 °C); partly cloudy
- Game attendance: 2,008
- Referee: M. Overton
- Box Score

Game information

First quarter
Second quarter
Third quarter
Fourth quarter

=== Yale ===
Brown vs. Yale – Game summary

Quarter	1	2	3	4	Total
Brown	0	0	0	7	7
Yale	20	7	7	0	34

at Yale Bowl • New Haven, CT

- Date: November 3
- Game time: 8:00 p.m.
- Game weather: 62 °F (17 °C); partly cloudy
- Game attendance: 8,216
- Referee: T. Boyd
- Box Score

Game information

First quarter
Second quarter
Third quarter
Fourth quarter

=== Dartmouth ===
Brown vs. Dartmouth – Game summary

Quarter	1	2	3	4	Total
Dartmouth	6	17	7	3	33
Brown	0	3	0	7	10

at Fenway Park • Boston, MA

- Date: November 10
- Game time: 8:00 p.m.
- Game weather: 27 °F (−3 °C); clear and cold
- Game attendance: 12,297
- Referee: J. Gray
- Box Score

Game information

First quarter
Second quarter
Third quarter
Fourth quarter

=== Columbia ===
Brown vs. Columbia – Game summary

Quarter	1	2	3	4	Total
Brown	0	0	6	0	6
Columbia	7	7	3	7	24

at Robert K. Kraft Field at Lawrence A. Wien Stadium • New York, NY

- Date: November 18
- Game time: 1:00 p.m.
- Game weather: 47 °F (8 °C); overcast
- Game attendance: 5,341
- Referee: T. Kichline
- Box Score

Game information

First quarter
Second quarter
Third quarter
Fourth quarter
