= 2017 Harvard Crimson football team =

American college football season

2017 Harvard Crimson football
- Conference: Ivy League
- Record: 5–5 (3–4 Ivy)
- Head coach: Tim Murphy (24th season)
- Offensive coordinator: Joel Lamb (12th season)
- Offensive scheme: Spread
- Defensive coordinator: Scott Larkee (9th season)
- Base defense: 4–3
- Home stadium: Harvard Stadium

2017 Ivy League football standings
	Conf.			Overall
Team	W		L	W		L
No. 24 Yale $	6	–	1	9	–	1
Columbia	5	–	2	8	–	2
Dartmouth	5	–	2	8	–	2
Penn	4	–	3	6	–	4
Harvard	3	–	4	5	–	5
Cornell	3	–	4	3	–	7
Princeton	2	–	5	5	–	5
Brown	0	–	7	2	–	8
$ – Conference champion; Rankings from STATS Poll

The 2017 Harvard Crimson football team represented Harvard University during the 2017 NCAA Division I FCS football season. They were led by 24th-year head coach Tim Murphy and played their home games at Harvard Stadium. They were a member of the Ivy League. They finished the season 5–5 overall and 3–4 in Ivy League play to tie for fifth place. Harvard averaged 10,411 fans per game.

== Schedule ==
The 2017 schedule consisted of five home games and five away games. The Crimson hosted Ivy League foes Brown, Princeton, Dartmouth, and Penn, and traveled to Cornell, Columbia, and Yale for the 134th edition of Harvard–Yale football rivalry. Harvard's non-conference opponents were Rhode Island of the Colonial Athletic Association, and Georgetown and Lafayette of the Patriot League.

Date	Time	Opponent	Site	TV	Result	Attendance
September 16	1:00 p.m.	at Rhode Island*	Meade Stadium; Kingston, RI		L 10–17	3,812
September 23	Noon	Brown	Harvard Stadium; Boston, MA	NESN+	W 45–28	10,651
September 30	2:00 p.m.	at Georgetown*	RFK Stadium; Washington, DC	STADIUM	W 41–2	3,256
October 7	1:30 p.m.	at Cornell	Schoellkopf Field; Ithaca, NY	ELVN	L 14–17	7,313
October 14	Noon	Lafayette*	Harvard Stadium; Boston, MA	NESN	W 38–10	10,025
October 20	7:30 p.m.	Princeton	Harvard Stadium; Boston, MA (rivalry)	NBCSN	L 17–52	10,114
October 28	Noon	Dartmouth	Harvard Stadium; Boston, MA (rivalry)	NESN	W 25–22	11,143
November 4	1:00 p.m.	at Columbia	Robert K. Kraft Field at Lawrence A. Wien Stadium; New York, NY	ELVN	W 21–14	7,011
November 11	Noon	Penn	Harvard Stadium; Boston, MA (rivalry)	NESN+	L 6–23	10,122
November 18	12:30 p.m.	at Yale	Yale Bowl; New Haven, CT (rivalry)	CNBC	L 3–24	51,426
*Non-conference game; All times are in Eastern time

== Game summaries ==
=== Rhode Island ===
Harvard vs. Rhode Island – Game summary

Quarter	1	2	3	4	Total
Harvard	3	7	0	0	10
Rhode Island	0	17	0	0	17

at Meade Stadium • Kingston, RI

- Date: September 16
- Game time: 1:00 p.m.
- Game weather: 79 °F (26 °C); nice, breezy
- Game attendance: 3,812
- Referee: M. Sechrist
- Box Score

Game information

First quarter
Second quarter
Third quarter
Fourth quarter

=== Brown ===
Brown vs. Harvard – Game summary

Quarter	1	2	3	4	Total
Brown	2	0	0	26	28
Harvard	14	7	17	7	45

at Harvard Stadium • Boston, MA

- Date: September 23
- Game time: Noon
- Game weather: 70 °F (21 °C); partly cloudy
- Game attendance: 10,651
- Referee: C. Jebran
- Box Score

Game information

First quarter
Second quarter
Third quarter
Fourth quarter

=== Georgetown ===
Harvard vs. Georgetown – Game summary

Quarter	1	2	3	4	Total
Harvard	14	17	3	7	41
Georgetown	0	2	0	0	2

at Cooper Field • Washington, D.C.

- Date: September 16
- Game time: 2:00 p.m.
- Game weather: 65 °F (18 °C); partly cloudy
- Game attendance: 3,256
- Referee: M. Overton
- Box Score

Game information

First quarter
Second quarter
Third quarter
Fourth quarter

=== Cornell ===
Harvard vs. Cornell – Game summary

Quarter	1	2	3	4	Total
Harvard	7	7	0	0	14
Cornell	0	7	7	3	17

at Schoellkopf Field • Ithaca, NY

- Date: October 7
- Game time: 1:30 p.m.
- Game weather: 73 °F (23 °C); partly cloudy
- Game attendance: 7,313
- Referee: J. Gansiejewski
- Box Score

Game information

First quarter

- HAR – L. Northington, 1 yard run, Jake McIntyre XP good, 5:50 (HAR 7–0)

Second quarter

- HAR – Jake Barann, 36 yard pass from Jake Smith, McIntyre XP good, 9:43 (HAR 14–0)
- COR – Jake Jatis, 2 yard run, Zach Mays XP good, 3:02 (HAR 14–7)

Third quarter

- COR – Jatis, 2 yard run, Mays XP good, 5:45 (TIE 14–14)

Fourth quarter

- COR – Mays, 27 yard field goal, 9:58 (COR 17–14)

=== Lafayette ===
Lafayette vs. Harvard – Game summary

Quarter	1	2	3	4	Total
Lafayette	7	0	3	0	10
Harvard	14	7	10	7	38

at Harvard Stadium • Boston, MA

- Date: October 14
- Game time: Noon
- Game weather: 65 °F (18 °C); cloudy
- Game attendance: 10,025
- Referee: T. Kichline
- Box Score

Game information

First quarter
Second quarter
Third quarter
Fourth quarter

=== Princeton ===
Princeton vs. Harvard – Game summary

Quarter	1	2	3	4	Total
Princeton	10	21	14	7	52
Harvard	0	10	0	7	17

at Harvard Stadium • Boston, MA

- Date: October 20
- Game time: 7:30 p.m.
- Game weather: 65 °F (18 °C); warm, breezy
- Game attendance: 10,114
- Referee: M. Sechrist
- Box Score

Game information

First quarter
Second quarter
Third quarter
Fourth quarter

=== Dartmouth ===
Dartmouth vs. Harvard – Game summary

Quarter	1	2	3	4	Total
Dartmouth	7	7	0	8	22
Harvard	0	6	6	13	25

at Harvard Stadium • Boston, MA

- Date: October 28
- Game time: Noon
- Game weather: 65 °F (18 °C); cloudy
- Game attendance: 11,143
- Referee: H. Wimberg
- Box Score

Game information

First quarter
Second quarter
Third quarter
Fourth quarter

=== Columbia ===
Harvard vs. Columbia – Game summary

Quarter	1	2	3	4	Total
Harvard	0	14	7	0	21
Columbia	7	0	0	7	14

at Robert K. Kraft Field at Lawrence A. Wien Stadium • New York, NY

- Date: November 4
- Game time: 1:00 p.m.
- Game weather: 55 °F (13 °C); mix of clouds and sun
- Game attendance: 7,011
- Referee: K. Hudson
- Box Score

Game information

First quarter
Second quarter
Third quarter
Fourth quarter

=== Penn ===
Penn vs. Harvard – Game summary

Quarter	1	2	3	4	Total
Penn	7	3	10	3	23
Harvard	0	3	3	0	6

at Harvard Stadium • Boston, MA

- Date: November 11
- Game time: Noon
- Game weather: 38 °F (3 °C); sunny, breezy
- Game attendance: 10,122
- Referee: W. Boyd
- Box Score

Game information

First quarter
Second quarter
Third quarter
Fourth quarter

=== Yale ===
Harvard vs. Yale – Game summary

Quarter	1	2	3	4	Total
Harvard	3	0	0	0	3
Yale	0	17	0	7	24

at Yale Bowl • New Haven, CT

- Date: November 18
- Game time: 12:30 p.m.
- Game weather: 45 °F (7 °C); cloudy
- Game attendance: 51,426
- Referee: H. Johns
- Box Score

Game information

First quarter
Second quarter
Third quarter
Fourth quarter
