= 2017 Penn Quakers football team =

American college football season

2017 Penn Quakers football
- Conference: Ivy League
- Record: 6–4 (4–3 Ivy)
- Head coach: Ray Priore (3rd season)
- Offensive coordinator: John Reagan (3rd season)
- Offensive scheme: Spread
- Defensive coordinator: Bob Benson (3rd season)
- Base defense: 3–3–5
- Home stadium: Franklin Field

2017 Ivy League football standings
	Conf.			Overall
Team	W		L	W		L
No. 24 Yale $	6	–	1	9	–	1
Columbia	5	–	2	8	–	2
Dartmouth	5	–	2	8	–	2
Penn	4	–	3	6	–	4
Harvard	3	–	4	5	–	5
Cornell	3	–	4	3	–	7
Princeton	2	–	5	5	–	5
Brown	0	–	7	2	–	8
$ – Conference champion; Rankings from STATS Poll

The 2017 Penn Quakers football team represented the University of Pennsylvania during the 2017 NCAA Division I FCS football season. They were led by third-year head coach Ray Priore. They played their home games at Franklin Field. They are a member of the Ivy League. They finished the season 6–4 overall and 4–3 in Ivy League play to place fourth . Penn averaged 5,274 fans per game.

== Schedule ==
The 2017 schedule consisted of five home and five away games. The Quakers hosted Ivy League foes Dartmouth, Yale, Princeton, and Cornell, and traveled to Columbia, Brown, and Harvard. Homecoming coincided with the game against Princeton on November 4.

In 2017, Penn's non-conference opponents were Ohio Dominican of the Great Midwest Athletic Conference (Division II), Lehigh of the Patriot League and Central Connecticut of the Northeast Conference.

Date	Time	Opponent	Site	TV	Result	Attendance
September 16	1:00 p.m.	Ohio Dominican*	Franklin Field; Philadelphia, PA	CSN-P	W 42–24	3,009
September 23	12:30 p.m.	at Lehigh*	Goodman Stadium; Bethlehem, PA	SE2	W 65–47	5,060
September 29	7:00 p.m.	Dartmouth	Franklin Field; Philadelphia, PA	NBCSN	L 13–16	4,023
October 7	1:00 p.m.	at Central Connecticut*	Arute Field; New Britain, CT	NECFR	L 21–42	4,917
October 14	1:30 p.m.	at Columbia	Robert K. Kraft Field at Lawrence A. Wien Stadium; New York, NY	ELVN	L 31–34 ^{OT}	13,081
October 21	1:00 p.m.	Yale	Franklin Field; Philadelphia, PA	NBCS PH+	L 19–24	6,408
October 28	12:30 p.m.	at Brown	Brown Stadium; Providence, RI	ELVN	W 17–7	2,008
November 4	1:00 p.m.	Princeton^{†}	Franklin Field; Philadelphia, PA (rivalry)	NBCS PH	W 38–35	9,073
November 11	Noon	at Harvard	Harvard Stadium; Boston, MA (rivalry)	NESN+	W 23–6	10,122
November 18	1:30 p.m.	Cornell	Franklin Field; Philadelphia, PA (rivalry)	ELVN	W 29–22	3,861
*Non-conference game; ^{†}Homecoming; All times are in Eastern time

== Game summaries ==
=== Ohio Dominican ===
Ohio Dominican vs. Penn – Game summary

Quarter	1	2	3	4	Total
Ohio Dominican	7	3	7	7	24
Penn	0	7	21	14	42

at Franklin Field • Philadelphia, PA

- Date: September 16
- Game time: 1:00 p.m.
- Game weather: 84 °F (29 °C); clear, sunny
- Game attendance: 3,009
- Referee: J. Gensiejewski
- Box Score

Game information

First quarter
Second quarter
Third quarter
Fourth quarter

=== Lehigh ===
Penn vs. Lehigh – Game summary

Quarter	1	2	3	4	Total
Penn	14	21	14	16	65
Lehigh	14	14	7	12	47

at Goodman Stadium • Bethlehem, PA

- Date: September 23
- Game time: 12:30 p.m.
- Game weather: 83 °F (28 °C); sunny, hot
- Game attendance: 5,060
- Referee: W. Boyd
- Box Score

Game information

First quarter
Second quarter
Third quarter
Fourth quarter

=== Dartmouth ===
Dartmouth vs. Penn – Game summary

Quarter	1	2	3	4	Total
Dartmouth	0	10	0	6	16
Penn	0	7	3	3	13

at Franklin Field • Philadelphia, PA

- Date: September 30
- Game time: 7:00 p.m.
- Game attendance: 4,023
- Box Score

Game information

Second quarter

- DART – Hunter Hagdorn, 12 yard pass from Jack Heneghan (David Smith XP good), 13:06 (DART 7–0)
- PENN – Justin Watson, 6 yard pass from Fischer-Colbrie (Jack Soslow XP good), 1:20 (TIE 7–7)
- DART – Smith, 43 yard field goal, 0:00 (DART 10–7)

Third quarter

- PENN – Soslow, 31 yard field goal, 0:30 (TIE 10–10)

Fourth quarter

- PENN – Soslow, 27 yard field goal, 5:37 (PENN 13–10)
- DART – Jared Gerbino, 1 yard run, 0:00 (DART 16–13)

=== Central Connecticut ===
Penn vs. Central Connecticut – Game summary

Quarter	1	2	3	4	Total
Penn	0	21	0	0	21
Central Connecticut	14	14	7	7	42

at Arute Field • New Britain, CT

- Date: October 7
- Game time: 1:00 p.m.
- Game weather: 75 °F (24 °C); overcast, humid
- Game attendance: 4,917
- Referee: C. Vaccaro
- Box Score

Game information

First quarter
Second quarter
Third quarter
Fourth quarter

=== Columbia ===
Penn vs. Columbia – Game summary

Quarter	1	2	3	4	OT	Total
Penn	7	7	7	7	3	31
Columbia	0	7	0	21	6	34

at Robert K. Kraft Field at Lawrence A. Wien Stadium • New York City, NY

- Date: October 14
- Game time: 1:30 p.m.
- Game weather: 69 °F (21 °C); mix of clouds and sun
- Game attendance: 13,081
- Referee: M. Sechrist
- Box Score

Game information

First quarter
Second quarter
Third quarter
Fourth quarter

=== Yale ===
Yale vs. Penn – Game summary

Quarter	1	2	3	4	Total
Yale	7	11	0	6	24
Penn	7	3	0	9	19

at Franklin Field • Philadelphia, PA

- Date: October 21
- Game time: 1:00 p.m.
- Game weather: 72 °F (22 °C); sunny
- Game attendance: 6,408
- Referee: T. Marcella
- Box Score

Game information

First quarter
Second quarter
Third quarter
Fourth quarter

=== Brown ===
Penn vs. Brown – Game summary

Quarter	1	2	3	4	Total
Penn	14	3	0	0	17
Brown	7	0	0	0	7

at Brown Stadium • Providence, RI

- Date: October 28
- Game time: 12:30 p.m.
- Game weather: 66 °F (19 °C); partly cloudy
- Game attendance: 2,008
- Referee: M. Overton
- Box Score

Game information

First quarter
Second quarter
Third quarter
Fourth quarter

=== Princeton ===
Princeton vs. Penn – Game summary

Quarter	1	2	3	4	Total
Princeton	7	0	14	14	35
Penn	7	10	7	14	38

at Franklin Field • Philadelphia, PA

- Date: November 4
- Game time: 1:00 p.m.
- Game weather: About 55 °F (13 °C); brisk fall day
- Game attendance: 9,073
- Referee: C. Jebran
- Box Score

Game information

First quarter
Second quarter
Third quarter
Fourth quarter

=== Harvard ===
Penn vs. Harvard – Game summary

Quarter	1	2	3	4	Total
Penn	7	3	10	3	23
Harvard	0	3	3	0	6

at Harvard Stadium • Boston, MA

- Date: November 11
- Game time: Noon
- Game weather: 38 °F (3 °C); sunny, breezy
- Game attendance: 10,122
- Referee: W. Boyd
- Box Score

Game information

First quarter
Second quarter
Third quarter
Fourth quarter

=== Cornell ===
Cornell vs. Penn – Game summary

Quarter	1	2	3	4	Total
Cornell	10	0	6	6	22
Penn	7	14	0	8	29

at Franklin Field • Philadelphia, PA

- Date: November 18
- Game time: 1:30 p.m.
- Game weather: 51 °F (11 °C); overcast
- Game attendance: 3,861
- Referee: H. Wimber
- Box Score

Game information

First quarter

- COR – Nickolas Null, 32 yard field goal, 9:39 (COR 3–0)
- PENN – Karekin Brooks, 38 yard run (Jack Soslow XP good), 5:37 (PENN 7–3)
- COR – Collin Shaw, 35 yard pass from Dalton Banks (Null XP good), 2:08 (COR 10–7)

Second quarter

- PENN – Brooks, 6 yard run (Soslow XP good), 11:14 (PENN 14–10)
- PENN – Justin Watson, 22 yard pass from Fischer-Colbrie (Soslow XP good), 0:24 (PENN 21–10)

Third quarter

- COR – Mac Pope, 3 yard run (2-pt. conversion failed), 4:37 (PENN 21–16)

Fourth quarter

- COR – Banks, 1 yard run (2-pt. conversion failed), 13:46 (COR 22–21)
- PENN – Tre Solomon, 3 yard run (2-pt. conversion good), 2:06 (PENN 29–22)

== 2018 NFL draft ==
Player	Team	Round	Pick #	Position
Justin Watson	Tampa Bay Buccaneers	5th	144	WR
