= Brian Rock =

American football coach (born 1962)

Current position
- Title: Assistant head coach / quarterbacks coach
- Team: Ferris State
- Conference: GLIAC

Biographical details
- Born: August 6, 1962 (age 64); Bowling Green, Ohio, U.S.
- Education: Bowling Green State University (1985); Kent State University (1986)

Coaching career (HC unless noted)
- 1985–1986: Bowling Green (GA)
- 1987–1991: Saint Joseph's (IN) (DC)
- 1992–1996: Western Michigan (TE)
- 1997–1999: Western Michigan (ST/WR)
- 2000–2004: Western Michigan (OC/WR)
- 2005: Western Michigan (ST/RB)
- 2006–2010: Purdue (WR)
- 2011–2014: Kent State (OC/QB)
- 2015–2017: Holy Cross (OC/QB)
- 2017: Holy Cross (interim HC/OC/QB)
- 2018: Oklahoma State (OA)
- 2019–present: Ferris State (AHC/QB)

Head coaching record
- Overall: 2–2

Brian Rock (born August 6, 1962) is an American college football coach. He is the assistant head coach and quarterbacks coach for Ferris State University, a position he has held since 2019. He previously coached for Bowling Green, Saint Joseph's (IN), Western Michigan, Purdue, Kent State, Holy Cross, and Oklahoma State.

With Holy Cross he served as the team's offensive coordinator and quarterbacks coach for three seasons before being named interim head coach for the remaining four games of the 2017 season.

== Head coaching record ==
Year	Team	Overall	Conference	Standing	Bowl/playoffs
Holy Cross Crusaders (Patriot League) (2017)
2017	Holy Cross	2–2 (Note: Rock was named interim head coach with four weeks remaining in the season following the firing of Tom Gilmore.)	2–2	T–3rd	
Holy Cross:		2–2	2–2		
Total:		2–2			
