= 2017 Columbia Lions football team =

American college football season

2017 Columbia Lions football
- Conference: Ivy League
- Record: 8–2 (5–2 Ivy)
- Head coach: Al Bagnoli (3rd season)
- Offensive coordinator: Mark Fabish (2nd season)
- Defensive coordinator: Paul Ferraro (3rd season)
- Home stadium: Robert K. Kraft Field at Lawrence A. Wien Stadium

2017 Ivy League football standings
	Conf.			Overall
Team	W		L	W		L
No. 24 Yale $	6	–	1	9	–	1
Columbia	5	–	2	8	–	2
Dartmouth	5	–	2	8	–	2
Penn	4	–	3	6	–	4
Harvard	3	–	4	5	–	5
Cornell	3	–	4	3	–	7
Princeton	2	–	5	5	–	5
Brown	0	–	7	2	–	8
$ – Conference champion; Rankings from STATS Poll

The 2017 Columbia Lions football team represented Columbia University in the 2017 NCAA Division I FCS football season. They were led by third-year head coach Al Bagnoli and played their home games at Robert K. Kraft Field at Lawrence A. Wien Stadium. They were a member of the Ivy League. They finished the season 8–2, 5–2 in Ivy League play to finish in a tie for second place. They were the winningest Columbia Lions football team since 1996, and are often viewed as the team that changed the trajectory of the program. The team was led by the greatest defensive line in Columbia Lions history, which starred Dominic Perkaj. They averaged 6,672 fans per game.

== Schedule ==
The 2017 schedule consisted of five home and five away games. The Lions hosted Ivy League foes Penn, Harvard, and Brown, and traveled to Princeton, Dartmouth, Yale, and Cornell. Homecoming coincided with the game against Penn on October 14.

In 2017, Columbia's non-conference opponents were Wagner of the Northeast Conference, Georgetown of the Patriot League, and Marist of the Pioneer Football League.

Date	Time	Opponent	Site	TV	Result	Attendance
September 16	1:00 p.m.	Wagner*	Robert K. Kraft Field at Lawrence A. Wien Stadium; New York, NY	SNY	W 17–14	3,828
September 23	1:00 p.m.	Georgetown*	Robert K. Kraft Field at Lawrence A. Wien Stadium; New York, NY	SNY	W 35–14	4,101
September 30	12:30 p.m.	at Princeton	Powers Field at Princeton Stadium; Princeton, NJ	ELVN	W 28–24	5,073
October 7	12:00 p.m.	at Marist*	Tenney Stadium at Leonidoff Field; Poughkeepsie, NY		W 41–17	2,396
October 14	1:30 p.m.	Penn^{†}	Robert K. Kraft Field at Lawrence A. Wien Stadium; New York, NY	ELVN	W 34–31 ^{OT}	13,081
October 21	12:30 p.m.	at Dartmouth	Memorial Field; Hanover, NH	ELVN	W 22–17	5,237
October 28	1:00 p.m.	at Yale	Yale Bowl; New Haven, CT	SNY	L 6–23	15,422
November 4	1:00 p.m.	Harvard	Robert K. Kraft Field at Lawrence A. Wien Stadium; New York, NY	ELVN	L 14–21	7,011
November 11	1:30 p.m.	at Cornell	Schoellkopf Field; Ithaca, NY (rivalry)	SNY	W 18–8	5,613
November 18	1:00 p.m.	Brown	Robert K. Kraft Field at Lawrence A. Wien Stadium; New York, NY	SNY	W 24–6	5,341
*Non-conference game; ^{†}Homecoming; All times are in Eastern time

== Game summaries ==
=== Wagner ===
Wagner vs. Columbia – Game summary

Quarter	1	2	3	4	Total
Wagner	0	0	7	7	14
Columbia	0	14	0	3	17

at Robert K. Kraft Field at Lawrence A. Wien Stadium • New York City, NY

- Date: September 16
- Game time: 1:00 p.m.
- Game weather: 77 °F (25 °C); hazy, humid
- Game attendance: 3,828
- Referee: E. Lewis
- Box Score

Game information

First quarter
Second quarter
Third quarter
Fourth quarter

=== Georgetown ===
Georgetown vs. Columbia – Game summary

Quarter	1	2	3	4	Total
Georgetown	0	0	0	14	14
Columbia	0	21	0	14	35

at Robert K. Kraft Field at Lawrence A. Wien Stadium • New York City, NY

- Date: September 23
- Game time: 1:00 p.m.
- Game weather: 82 °F (28 °C); clear skies, sunny
- Game attendance: 4,101
- Referee: M. Sechrist
- Box Score

Game information

First quarter
Second quarter
Third quarter
Fourth quarter

=== Princeton ===
Columbia vs. Princeton – Game summary

Quarter	1	2	3	4	Total
Columbia	7	7	7	7	28
Princeton	7	7	3	7	24

at Powers Field at Princeton Stadium • Princeton, NJ

- Date: September 30
- Game time: 12:30 p.m.
- Game weather: 64 °F (18 °C); cloudy, windy
- Game attendance: 5,073
- Referee: S. Cadorette
- Box Score

Game information

First Quarter

- PRIN – Jesper Horsted, 9 yard pass from Chad Kanoff (Tavish Rice XP good), 11:42 (PRIN 7–0)
- CLMB– R. Smith II, 46 yard pass from Anders Hill (Oren Milstein XP good), 6:29 (TIE 7–7)

Second Quarter

- PRIN – Horsted, 12 yard pass from Kanoff (Rice XP good), 8:21 (PRIN 14–7)
- CLMB– Tanner Thomas, 11 yard run (Milstein XP good), 3:16 (TIE 14–14)

Third Quarter

- CLMB– Josh Bean, 2 yard run (Milstein XP good), 12:09 (CLMB 21–14)
- PRIN – Rice, 26 yard field goal, 3:27 (CLMB 21–17)

Fourth Quarter

- PRIN – S. Carlson, 27 yard pass from Kanoff, 2:48 (PRIN 24–21)
- CLMB– Smith II, 63 yard pass from Hill (Milstein XP good), 1:12 (CLMB 28–24)

=== Marist ===
Columbia vs. Marist – Game summary

Quarter	1	2	3	4	Total
Columbia	21	17	0	3	41
Marist	0	0	10	7	17

at Leonidoff Field • Poughkeepsie, NY

- Date: October 7
- Game time: Noon
- Game weather: 75 °F (24 °C); mostly cloudy
- Game attendance: 2,396
- Referee: D. Carter
- Box Score

Game information

First quarter
Second quarter
Third quarter
Fourth quarter

=== Penn ===
Penn vs. Columbia – Game summary

Quarter	1	2	3	4	OT	Total
Penn	7	7	7	7	3	31
Columbia	0	7	0	21	6	34

at Robert K. Kraft Field at Lawrence A. Wien Stadium • New York City, NY

- Date: October 14
- Game time: 1:30 p.m.
- Game weather: 69 °F (21 °C); mix of sun and clouds
- Game attendance: 13,081
- Referee: M. Sechrist
- Box Score

Game information

First Quarter

- PENN– Will Fischer-Colbrie 2 Yd Run (Jack Soslow Kick), 4:26 (PENN 7–0)

Second Quarter

- PENN- Karekin Brooks 5 Yd Run (Jack Soslow Kick), 14:55 (PENN 14-0)
- CLMB- Josh Bean 2 Yd Run (Oren Milstein Kick), 6:27 (PENN 14-7)

Third Quarter

- PENN- Nick Miller 25 Yd Interception Return (Jack Soslow Kick), 11:09 (PENN 21-7)

Fourth Quarter

- CLMB- Josh Bean 1 Yd Run (Oren Milstein Kick), 10:55 (PENN 21-14)
- CLMB- Josh Wainwright 59 Yd pass from Anders Hill (Oren Milstein Kick), 8:35 (TIE 21-21)
- CLMB- Rory Schlageter 7 Yd pass from Anders Hill (Oren Milstein Kick), 4:11 (CLMB 28-21)
- PENN- Justin Watson 17 Yd pass from Will Fischer-Colbrie (Jack Soslow Kick), 1:21 (TIE 28-28)

Overtime

- PENN- Jack Soslow 41 Yd Field Goal (PENN 31-28)
- CLMB- Josh Wainwright 24 Yd pass from Anders Hill (CLMB 34-31)

=== Dartmouth ===
Columbia vs. Dartmouth – Game summary

Quarter	1	2	3	4	Total
Columbia	3	13	6	0	22
Dartmouth	0	0	7	10	17

at Memorial Field • Hanover, NH

- Date: October 21
- Game time: 12:30 p.m.
- Game weather: 66 °F (19 °C); sunny and warm
- Game attendance: 5,237
- Referee: H. Johns
- Box Score

Game information

First quarter
Second quarter
Third quarter
Fourth quarter

=== Yale ===
Columbia vs. Yale – Game summary

Quarter	1	2	3	4	Total
Columbia	0	0	6	0	6
Yale	13	0	3	7	23

at Yale Bowl

- Date: October 28
- Game time: 1:00 p.m.
- Game weather: 66 °F (19 °C); mostly sunny
- Game attendance: 15,422
- Referee: J. Pumphrey
- Box Score

Game information

First quarter
Second quarter
Third quarter
Fourth quarter

=== Harvard ===
Harvard vs. Columbia – Game summary

Quarter	1	2	3	4	Total
Harvard	0	14	7	0	21
Columbia	7	0	0	7	14

at Robert K. Kraft Field at Lawrence A. Wien Stadium • New York City, NY

- Date: November 4
- Game time: 1:00 p.m.
- Game weather: 55 °F (13 °C); mix of clouds and sun
- Game attendance: 7,011
- Referee: K. Hudson
- Box Score

Game information

First quarter
Second quarter
Third quarter
Fourth quarter

=== Cornell ===
Columbia vs. Cornell – Game summary

Quarter	1	2	3	4	Total
Columbia	3	3	5	7	18
Cornell	0	0	0	8	8

at Schoellkopf Field • Ithaca, NY

- Date: November 11
- Game time: 1:30 p.m.
- Game weather: 34 °F (1 °C); clear and sunny
- Game attendance: 5,613
- Referee: H. Johns
- Box Score

Game information

First quarter

- COL – Oren Milstein, 26 yard field goal, 5:05 (COL 3–0)

Second quarter

- COL – Milstein, 33 yard field goal, 0:22 (COL 6–0)

Third quarter

- COL – safety (Connor Heeb), 9:04 (COL 8–0)
- COL – Milstein, 28 yard field goal, 2:23 (COL 11–0)

Fourth quarter

- COL – Chris Schroer, 2 yard run (Milstein XP good), 3:28 (COL 18–0)
- COR – Josh Sweet, 7 yard run (2-pt conversion good), 1:09 (COL 18–8)

=== Brown ===
Brown vs. Columbia – Game summary

Quarter	1	2	3	4	Total
Brown	0	0	6	0	6
Columbia	7	7	3	7	24

at Robert K. Kraft Field at Lawrence A. Wien Stadium • New York City, NY

- Date: November 18
- Game time: 1:00 p.m.
- Game weather: 47 °F (8 °C); overcast
- Game attendance: 5,341
- Referee: T. Kichline
- Box Score

Game information

First quarter
Second quarter
Third quarter
Fourth quarter
