= 2017 Cornell Big Red football team =

American college football season

2017 Cornell Big Red football

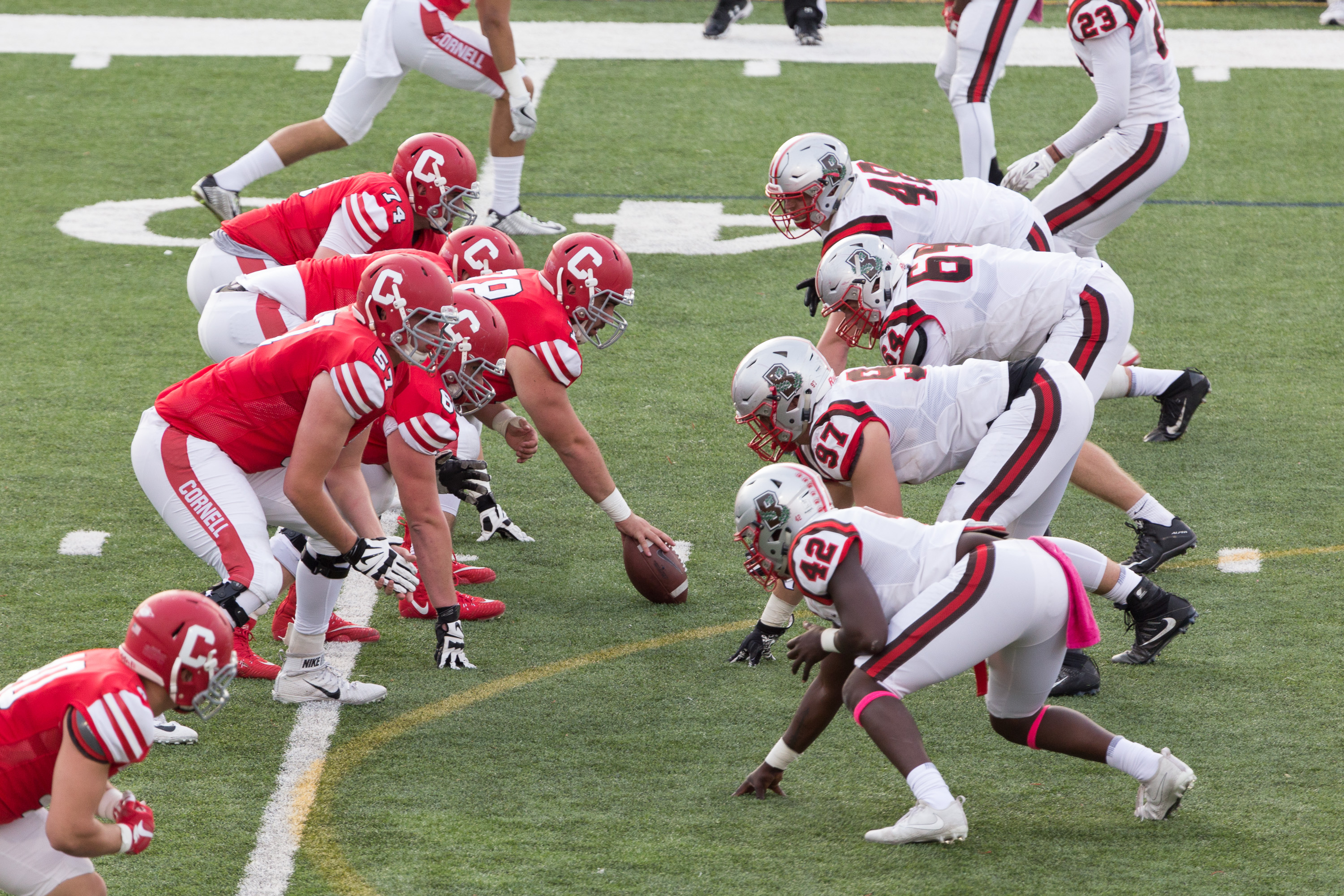
- Cornell vs. Brown, October 21 (Homecoming game)
- Conference: Ivy League
- Record: 3–7 (3–4 Ivy)
- Head coach: David Archer (5th season)
- Offensive coordinator: Joe Villapiano (1st season)
- Defensive coordinator: Jared Backus (5th season)
- Captains: Kurt Frimel; Jack Gellatly; Nick Gesualdi; Miles Norris
- Home stadium: Schoellkopf Field

2017 Ivy League football standings
	Conf.			Overall
Team	W		L	W		L
No. 24 Yale $	6	–	1	9	–	1
Columbia	5	–	2	8	–	2
Dartmouth	5	–	2	8	–	2
Penn	4	–	3	6	–	4
Harvard	3	–	4	5	–	5
Cornell	3	–	4	3	–	7
Princeton	2	–	5	5	–	5
Brown	0	–	7	2	–	8
$ – Conference champion; Rankings from STATS Poll

The 2017 Cornell Big Red football team represented Cornell University in the 2017 NCAA Division I FCS football season as a member of the Ivy League. They were led by fifth-year head coach David Archer and played their home games at Schoellkopf Field. Cornell finished the season 3–7 overall and 3–4 in Ivy League play to tie for fifth place. Cornell averaged 6,793 fans per gam.

== Schedule ==
The 2017 schedule consisted of five home and five away games. The Big Red hosted Ivy League foes Harvard, Brown, and Columbia, and traveled to Yale, Princeton, Dartmouth, and Penn. Homecoming coincided with the game against Brown on October 21.

In 2017, Cornell's non-conference opponents were Delaware of the Colonial Athletic Association, and Colgate and Bucknell of the Patriot League.

Date	Time	Opponent	Site	TV	Result	Attendance
September 16	3:30 p.m.	at Delaware*	Delaware Stadium; Newark, DE		L 14–41	14,714
September 23	1:00 p.m.	at Yale	Yale Bowl; New Haven, CT	ELVN	L 24–49	10,926
September 30	1:30 p.m.	Colgate*	Schoellkopf Field; Ithaca, NY (rivalry)		L 7–21	3,325
October 7	1:30 p.m.	Harvard	Schoellkopf Field; Ithaca, NY	ELVN	W 17–14	7,313
October 14	1:30 p.m.	Bucknell*	Schoellkopf Field; Ithaca, NY		L 18–26	4,202
October 21	3:00 p.m.	Brown^{†}	Schoellkopf Field; Ithaca, NY		W 34–7	13,514
October 28	7:00 p.m.	at Princeton	Powers Field at Princeton Stadium; Princeton, NJ	NBCSN	W 29–28	5,642
November 4	1:30 p.m.	at Dartmouth	Memorial Field; Hanover, NH (rivalry)		L 0–10	4,033
November 11	1:30 p.m.	Columbia	Schoellkopf Field; Ithaca, NY (rivalry)	SNY	L 8–18	5,613
November 18	1:30 p.m.	at Penn	Franklin Field; Philadelphia, PA (rivalry)	ELVN	L 22–29	3,861
*Non-conference game; ^{†}Homecoming; All times are in Eastern time

== Game summaries ==
=== Delaware ===
Cornell vs. Delaware – Game summary

Quarter	1	2	3	4	Total
Cornell	0	0	7	7	14
Delaware	10	17	7	7	41

at Delaware Stadium • Newark, DE

- Date: September 16
- Game time: 3:30 p.m.
- Game weather: 83 °F (28 °C); partly cloudy, humid
- Game attendance: 14,714
- Referee: St. Cadorette
- Box Score

Game information

First quarter

- DEL – Kani Kane, 3 yard run, Frank Raggo XP good, 14:07 (DEL 7–0)
- DEL – Raggo, 37 yard field goal, 1:48 (DEL 10–0)

Second quarter

- DEL – Kane, 1 yard run, Raggo XP good, 11:42 (DEL 17–0)
- DEL – Kane, 3 yard run, Jake Roth XP good, 1:04 (DEL 24–0)
- DEL – Raggo, 34 yard field goal, 0:04 (DEL 27–0)

Third quarter

- DEL – Jamie Jarmon, 12 yard pass from Joe Walker, Raggo XP good, 11:28 (DEL 34–0)
- COR – Eric Gallman, 27 yard pass from Dalton Banks, Zach Mays XP good, 8:14 (DEL 34–7)

Fourth quarter

- DEL – Charles Scarff, 6 yard pass from Walker, Raggo XP good, 4:32 (DEL 41–7)
- COR – Josh Sweet, 2 yard run, Mays XP good, 0:14 (DEL 41–14)

=== Yale ===
Cornell vs. Yale – Game summary

Quarter	1	2	3	4	Total
Cornell	3	7	0	14	24
Yale	7	7	14	21	49

at Yale Bowl • New Haven, CT

- Date: September 23
- Game time: 1:00 p.m.
- Game weather: 80 °F (27 °C); sunny, warm
- Game attendance: 10,926
- Referee: T. Kichline
- TV: ELVN
- Box Score

Game information

First quarter

- COR – Zach Mays, 21 yard field goal, 10:11 (COR 3–0)
- YALE – Carlson Hayden, 19 yard interception return, Alex Galland XP good, 1:45 (YALE 7–3)

Second quarter

- COR – Chris Walker, 14 yard pass from Dalton Banks, Mays XP good, 4:13 (COR 10–7)
- YALE – Kurt Rawlings, 14 yard run, Galland XP good, 0:37 (YALE 14–10)

Third quarter

- YALE – Deshawn Salter, 3 yard run, Galland XP good, 11:50 (YALE 21–10)
- YALE – Salter, 1 yard run, Galland XP good, 1:18 (YALE 28–10)

Fourth quarter

- YALE – Jaeden Graham, 4 yard pass from Rawlings, Galland XP good, 14:56 (YALE 35–10)
- COR – Harold Coles, 90 yard run, Mays XP no good, 14:33 (YALE 35–16)
- COR – James Hubbard, 57 yard pass from Banks, Hubbard pass from Banks for 2-point conversion, 8:23 (YALE 35–24)
- YALE – Salter, 82 yard run, Galland XP good, 8:12 (YALE 42–24)
- YALE – Zane Dudek, 14 yard run, Galland XP good, 5:38 (YALE 49–24)

=== Colgate ===
Colgate vs. Cornell – Game summary

Quarter	1	2	3	4	Total
Colgate	0	14	0	7	21
Cornell	0	0	7	0	7

at Schoellkopf Field • Ithaca, NY

- Date: September 30
- Game time: 1:30 p.m.
- Game attendance: 3,325
- Referee: W. Boyd
- Box Score

Game information

Second quarter

- COL – Thomas Ives, 7 yard pass from Grant Breneman, Chris Puzzi XP good, 10:42 (COL 7–0)
- COL – Breneman, 8 yard run, Puzzi XP good, 4:43 (COL 14–0)

Third quarter

- COR – Dalton Banks, 1 yard run, Zach Mays XP good, 1:25 (COL 14–7)

Fourth quarter

- COL – Malik Twyman, 7 yard pass from Breneman, Puzzi XP good, 9:39 (COL 21–7)

=== Harvard ===
Harvard vs. Cornell – Game summary

Quarter	1	2	3	4	Total
Harvard	7	7	0	0	14
Cornell	0	7	7	3	17

at Schoellkopf Field • Ithaca, NY

- Date: October 7
- Game time: 1:30 p.m.
- Game weather: 73 °F (23 °C); partly cloudy
- Game attendance: 7,313
- Referee: J. Gansiejewski
- Box Score

Game information

First quarter

- HAR – L. Northington, 1 yard run, Jake McIntyre XP good, 5:50 (HAR 7–0)

Second quarter

- HAR – Jake Barann, 36 yard pass from Jake Smith, McIntyre XP good, 9:43 (HAR 14–0)
- COR – Jake Jatis, 2 yard run, Zach Mays XP good, 3:02 (HAR 14–7)

Third quarter

- COR – Jatis, 2 yard run, Mays XP good, 5:45 (TIE 14–14)

Fourth quarter

- COR – Mays, 27 yard field goal, 9:58 (COR 17–14)

=== Bucknell ===
Bucknell vs. Cornell – Game summary

Quarter	1	2	3	4	Total
Bucknell	7	3	13	3	26
Cornell	0	3	7	8	18

at Schoellkopf Field • Ithaca, NY

- Date: October 14
- Game time: 1:30 p.m.
- Game weather: 73 °F (23 °C); partly cloudy
- Game attendance: 4,202
- Referee: J. Pumphrey
- Box Score

Game information

First quarter

- BUCK – Jack Horan, 64 yard pass from J. Chiarolanzio (John Burdick XP good), 8:20 (BUCK 7–0)

Second quarter

- BUCK – Burdick, 19 yard field goal, 3:17 (BUCK 10–0)
- COR – Zach Mays, 35 yard field goal, 0:38 (BUCK 10–3)

Third quarter

- COR – Davy Lizana, 9 yard pass from Jake Jatis, (Mays XP good), 12:15 (TIE 10–10)
- BUCK – Burdick, 38 yard field goal, 10:04 (BUCK 13–10)
- BUCK – Burdick, 33 yard field goal, 6:33 (BUCK 16–10)
- BUCK – Alan Butler, 22 yard pass from Chiarolanzio (Burdick XP good), 0:35 (BUCK 23–10)

Fourth quarter

- BUCK – Burdick, 28 yard field goal, 3:16 (BUCK 26–10)
- COR – Owen Peters, 4 yard pass from Dalton Banks (2-pt. conversion good) 0:39 (BUCK 23–18)

=== Brown ===
Brown vs. Cornell – Game summary

Quarter	1	2	3	4	Total
Brown	0	0	0	7	7
Cornell	3	10	7	14	34

at Schoellkopf Field • Ithaca, NY

- Date: October 21
- Game time: 3:00 p.m.
- Game weather: 73 °F (23 °C); partly cloudy, warm
- Game attendance: 13,514
- Referee: C. Bloh
- Box Score

Game information

First quarter

- COR – Zach Mays, 24 yard field goal, 9:19 (COR 3–0)

Second quarter

- COR – Mays, 30 yard field goal, 12:11 (COR 6–0)
- COR – Harold Coles, 3 yard run (Mays XP good), 7:47 (COR 13–0)

Third quarter

- COR – Chris Walker, 3 yard run (Nickolas Null XP good), 0:24 (COR 20–0)

Fourth quarter

- COR – Coles, 42 yard run (Null XP good), 13:39 (COR 27–0)
- COR – Jack Gellatly, 3 yard run (Null XP good), 11:01 (COR 34–0)
- BRWN – Anton Casey, 3 yard pass from Nick Duncan (Ben Rosenblatt XP good), 8:13 (COR 34–7)

=== Princeton ===
Cornell vs. Princeton – Game summary

Quarter	1	2	3	4	Total
Cornell	0	10	6	13	29
Princeton	7	14	7	0	28

at Powers Field at Princeton Stadium • Princeton, NJ

- Date: October 28
- Game time: 7:00 p.m.
- Game attendance: 5,642
- Referee: W. Boyd
- TV: NBCSN
- Box Score

Game information

First quarter

- PRIN – Chad Kanoff, 14 yard run (Tavish Rice XP good), 5:58 (PRIN 7–0)

Second quarter

- COR – Hayes Nolte, 12 yard pass from Dalton Banks (Nickolas Null XP good), 14:34 (TIE 7–7)
- PRIN – S. Carlson, 23 yard pass from Kanoff (Rice XP good), 11:47 (PRIN 14–7)
- PRIN – Carlson, 20 yard pass from Kanoff (Rice XP good), 4:58 (PRIN 21–7)
- COR – Null, 23 yard field goal, 0:14 (PRIN 21–10)

Third quarter

- COR – Chris Walker, 1 yard run (2-pt. conversion failed), 8:42 (PRIN 21–16)
- PRIN – Ryan Quigley, 7 yard run (Rice XP good), 1:37 (PRIN 28–16)

Fourth quarter

- COR – Null, 28 yard field goal, 11:00 (PRIN 28–19)
- COR – Jake Jatis, 8 yard run (Null XP good), 7:13 (PRIN 28–26)
- COR – Null, 43 yard field goal, 0:48 (COR 29–28)

=== Dartmouth ===
Cornell vs. Dartmouth – Game summary

Quarter	1	2	3	4	Total
Cornell	0	0	0	0	0
Dartmouth	7	0	0	3	10

at Memorial Field • Hanover, NH

- Date: November 4
- Game time: 1:30 p.m.
- Game weather: 45 °F (7 °C); sunny
- Game attendance: 4,033
- Referee: S. Cadorette
- Box Score

Game information

First quarter

- DART – Hunter Hagdorn, 23 yard pass from Jack Heneghan (David Smith XP good), 6:22 (DART 7–0)

Fourth quarter

- DART – Smith, 33 yard field goal, 1:19 (DART 10–0)

=== Columbia ===
Cornell vs. Columbia – Game summary

Quarter	1	2	3	4	Total
Columbia	3	3	5	7	18
Cornell	0	0	0	8	8

at Schoellkopf Field • Ithaca, NY

- Date: November 11
- Game time: 1:30 p.m.
- Game weather: 34 °F (1 °C); clear and sunny
- Game attendance: 5,613
- Referee: H. Johns
- Box Score

Game information

First quarter

- COL – Oren Milstein, 26 yard field goal, 5:05 (COL 3–0)

Second quarter

- COL – Milstein, 33 yard field goal, 0:22 (COL 6–0)

Third quarter

- COL – safety (Connor Heeb), 9:04 (COL 8–0)
- COL – Milstein, 28 yard field goal, 2:23 (COL 11–0)

Fourth quarter

- COL – Chris Schroer, 2 yard run (Milstein XP good), 3:28 (COL 18–0)
- COR – Josh Sweet, 7 yard run (2-pt conversion good), 1:09 (COL 18–8)

=== Penn ===
Cornell vs. Penn – Game summary

Quarter	1	2	3	4	Total
Cornell	10	0	6	6	22
Penn	7	14	0	8	29

at Franklin Field • Philadelphia, PA

- Date: November 18
- Game time: 1:30 p.m.
- Game weather: 51 °F (11 °C); overcast
- Game attendance: 3,861
- Referee: H. Wimber
- Box Score

Game information

First quarter

- COR – Nickolas Null, 32 yard field goal, 9:39 (COR 3–0)
- PENN – Karekin Brooks, 38 yard run (Jack Soslow XP good), 5:37 (PENN 7–3)
- COR – Collin Shaw, 35 yard pass from Dalton Banks (Null XP good), 2:08 (COR 10–7)

Second quarter

- PENN – Brooks, 6 yard run (Soslow XP good), 11:14 (PENN 14–10)
- PENN – Justin Watson, 22 yard pass from Fischer-Colbrie (Soslow XP good), 0:24 (PENN 21–10)

Third quarter

- COR – Mac Pope, 3 yard run (2-pt. conversion failed), 4:37 (PENN 21–16)

Fourth quarter

- COR – Banks, 1 yard run (2-pt. conversion failed), 13:46 (COR 22–21)
- PENN – Tre Solomon, 3 yard run (2-pt. conversion good), 2:06 (PENN 29–22)
