= 2017 Yale Bulldogs football team =

American college football season

2017 Yale Bulldogs football

Ivy League champion
- Conference: Ivy League

Ranking
- STATS: No. 24
- FCS Coaches: No. 24
- Record: 9–1 (6–1 Ivy)
- Head coach: Tony Reno (6th season)
- Offensive coordinator: Joe Conlin (4th season)
- Offensive scheme: Spread
- Defensive coordinator: Sean McGowan (1st season)
- Base defense: 4–2–5
- Home stadium: Yale Bowl

2017 Ivy League football standings
	Conf.			Overall
Team	W		L	W		L
No. 24 Yale $	6	–	1	9	–	1
Columbia	5	–	2	8	–	2
Dartmouth	5	–	2	8	–	2
Penn	4	–	3	6	–	4
Harvard	3	–	4	5	–	5
Cornell	3	–	4	3	–	7
Princeton	2	–	5	5	–	5
Brown	0	–	7	2	–	8
$ – Conference champion; Rankings from STATS Poll

The 2017 Yale Bulldogs football team represented Yale University in the 2017 NCAA Division I FCS football season, winning the Ivy League title. The season marked the Bulldogs' 145th overall season. The team played its home games at Yale Bowl in New Haven, Connecticut and were led by sixth-year head coach Tony Reno. They finished the season 9–1 overall and 6–1 in Ivy League play to become Ivy League champions for the first time since 2006 (when they shared the title) and to earn their first sole league title since 1980. Yale averaged 18,939 fans per game.

== Schedule ==
The 2017 season consisted of five home games and five away games. The Bulldogs hosted Ivy League foes Cornell, Columbia, Brown, and Harvard for the 134th edition of The Game, and traveled to Dartmouth, Penn, and Princeton.

Yale's non-conference opponents were Lehigh, Fordham, and Holy Cross, all of the Patriot League.

Date	Time	Opponent	Site	TV	Result	Attendance
September 16	12:30 p.m.	at Lehigh*	Goodman Stadium; Bethlehem, PA	PLN	W 56–28	4,996
September 23	1:00 p.m.	Cornell	Yale Bowl; New Haven, CT	ELVN	W 49–24	10,926
September 30	6:00 p.m.	at Fordham*	Coffey Field; Bronx, NY	PLN	W 41–10	3,988
October 7	1:30 p.m.	at Dartmouth	Memorial Field; Hanover, NH	ESPN3	L 27–28	8,114
October 14	1:00 p.m.	Holy Cross*	Yale Bowl; New Haven, CT	ILN	W 32–0	8,709
October 21	1:00 p.m.	at Penn	Franklin Field; Philadelphia, PA	TCN	W 24–19	6,408
October 28	1:00 p.m.	Columbia	Yale Bowl; New Haven, CT	SNY	W 23–6	15,422
November 3	8:00 p.m.	Brown	Yale Bowl; New Haven, CT	NBCSN	W 34–7	8,216
November 11	1:00 p.m.	at Princeton	Powers Field at Princeton Stadium; Princeton, NJ (rivalry)	ELVN	W 35–31	11,229
November 18	12:30 p.m.	Harvard	Yale Bowl; New Haven, CT (rivalry)	CNBC	W 24–3	51,426
*Non-conference game; All times are in Eastern time

== Game summaries ==
=== Lehigh (Yank Townsend Trophy) ===
Yale vs. Lehigh – Game summary

Quarter	1	2	3	4	Total
Yale	14	14	14	14	56
Lehigh	7	6	8	7	28

at Goodman Stadium • Bethlehem, PA

- Date: September 16
- Game time: 12:30 p.m.
- Game weather: 81 °F (27 °C); sunny, hot
- Game attendance: 4,996
- Referee: C. Bloh
- Box Score

Game information

First quarter

- (13:43) YALE - Melvin Rouse II 37 yd pass from Kurt Rawlings (Alex Galland kick), (Drive 3 plays, 70 yards, 1:17; 7-0 Yale)
- (09:58) YALE - Christopher Williams-Lopez 43 yd pass from Kurt Rawlings (Alex Galland kick), (Drive 2 plays, 43 yards, 0:45; 14-0 Yale)
- (00:01) LEHIGH - Nana Amankwah-Ayeh 4 yd run (Austin Henning kick), (Drive 14 plays, 70 yards, 6:22; 14-7 Yale)

Second quarter

- (09:25) LEHIGH - Gatlin Casey 11 yd pass from Brad Mayes (Austin Henning kick blocked), (Drive 10 plays, 91 yards, 4:58; 14-13 Yale)
- (04:13) YALE - Deshawn Salter 1 yd run (Alex Galland kick), (Drive 12 plays, 79 yards, 5:06; 21-13 Yale)
- (00:21) YALE - JP Shohfi 11 yd pass from Kurt Rawlings (Alex Galland kick), (Drive 7 plays, 25 yards, 2:57; 28-13 Yale)

Third quarter

- (14:04) LEHIGH - Gatlin Casey 66 yd pass from Brad Mayes (Sasha Kelsey pass), (Drive 2 plays, 72 yards, 0:50; 28-21 Yale)
- (12:31) YALE - Melvin Rouse II 31 yd pass from Kurt Rawlings (Andrew Johnson rush failed), (Drive 4 plays, 63 yards, 1:28; 34-21 Yale)
- (06:16) YALE - Zane Dudek 69 yd run (Kurt Rawlings Pass to Christopher Williams-Lopez for Two-Point Conversion), (Drive 4 plays, 80 yards, 2:00; 42-21 Yale)

Fourth quarter

- (08:55) YALE - Zane Dudek 29 yd run (Alex Galland kick), (Drive 1 plays, 29 yards, 0:11; 49-21 Yale)
- (06:07) LEHIGH - Jorge Portorreal 53 yd pass from Brad Mayes (Austin Henning kick), (Drive 5 plays, 62 yards, 2:38; 49-28 Yale)
- (03:40) YALE - Andrew Grinde 2 yd run (Alex Galland kick), (Drive 4 plays, 45 yards, 2:24; 56-28 Yale)

=== Cornell ===
Cornell vs. Yale – Game summary

Quarter	1	2	3	4	Total
Cornell	3	7	0	14	24
Yale	7	7	14	21	49

at Yale Bowl • New Haven, CT

- Date: September 23
- Game time: 1:00 p.m.
- Game weather: 80 °F (27 °C); sunny, warm
- Game attendance: 10,926
- Referee: T. Kichline
- Box Score

Game information

First quarter

- COR – Zach Mays, 21 yard field goal, 10:11 (COR 3–0)
- YALE – Carlson Hayden, 19 yard interception return, Alex Galland XP good, 1:45 (YALE 7–3)

Second quarter

- COR – Chris Walker, 14 yard pass from Dalton Banks, Zach Mays XP good, 4:13 (COR 10–7)
- YALE – Kurt Rawlings, 14 yard run, Alex Galland XP good, 0:37 (YALE 14–10)

Third quarter

- YALE – Deshawn Salter, 3 yard run, Alex Galland XP good, 11:50 (YALE 21–10)
- YALE – Deshawn Salter, 1 yard run, Alex Galland XP good, 1:18 (YALE 28–10)

Fourth quarter

- YALE – Jaeden Graham, 4 yard pass from Kurt Rawlings, Alex Galland XP good, 14:56 (YALE 35–10)
- COR – Harold Coles, 90 yard run, Zach Mays XP no good, 14:33 (YALE 35–16)
- COR – James Hubbard, 57 yard pass from Dalton Banks, James Hubbard pass from Dalton Banks for 2-point conversion, 8:23 (YALE 35–24)
- YALE – Deshawn Salter, 82 yard run, Alex Galland XP good, 8:12 (YALE 42–24)
- YALE – Zane Dudek, 14 yard run, Alex Galland XP good, 5:38 (YALE 49–24)

=== Fordham ===
Yale vs. Fordham – Game summary

Quarter	1	2	3	4	Total
Yale	21	7	13	0	41
Fordham	0	3	0	7	10

at Coffey Field • Bronx, NY

- Date: September 30
- Game time: 6:00 p.m.
- Game weather: 60 °F (16 °C); cloudy and windy
- Game attendance: 3,988
- Referee: C. Jebran
- Box Score

Game information

First quarter

- (11:50) YALE - Deshawn Salter 38 yd run (Alex Galland kick), (Drive 5 plays 60 yards 1:55; 7-0 Yale)
- (05:11) YALE - Zane Dudek 8 yd run (Alex Galland kick), (Drive 10 plays 82 yards 4:42; 14-0 Yale)
- (02:34) YALE - Jaeden Graham 19 yd pass from Kurt Rawlings (Alex Galland kick), (Drive 4 plays 38 yards 1:41; 21-0 Yale)

Second quarter

- (10:43) FOR - Andrew Mevis 31 yd field goal, (Drive 14 plays 63 yards 6:46; 21-3 Yale)
- (07:36) YALE - Deshawn Salter 27 yd run (Alex Galland kick), (Drive 7 plays 80 yards 3:01; 28-3 Yale)

Third quarter

- (13:00) YALE - Deshawn Salter 1 yd run (Alex Galland kick), (Drive 4 plays 65 yards 2:00; 35-3 Yale)
- (08:59) YALE - Zane Dudek 22 yd run (Alex Galland kick failed), (Drive 5 plays 46 yards 2:28; 41-3 Yale)

Fourth quarter

- (05:43) FOR - Zach Davis 20 yd run (Andrew Mevis kick), (Drive 11 plays 61 yards 5:21; 41-10 Yale)

=== Dartmouth ===
Yale vs. Dartmouth – Game summary

Quarter	1	2	3	4	Total
Yale	7	17	3	0	27
Dartmouth	0	7	7	14	28

at Memorial Field • Hanover, NH

- Date: October 7
- Game time: 1:30 p.m.
- Game weather: 50 °F (10 °C); overcast
- Game attendance: 8,114
- Referee: W. Gillis
- Box Score

Game information

First quarter

- YALE –. Christopher Williams-Lopez, 46 yard pass from Kurt Rawlings (Alex Galland XP good), 3:59 (YALE 7–0)

Second quarter

- YALE – Melvin Rouse II, 4 yard pass from Kurt Rawlings (Alex Galland XP good), 14:14 (YALE 14–0)
- YALE – Zane Dudek, 22 yard pass from Kurt Rawlings (Alex Galland XP good), 7:39 (YALE 21–0)
- DART – Isiah Swann, 47 yard interception return (David Smith XP good), 2:24 (YALE 21–7)
- YALE – Alex Galland, 29 yard field goal, 0:00 (YALE 24–7)

Third quarter

- DART – Drew Hunnicut, 30 yard pass from Jack Heneghan (David Smith XP good), 12:18 (YALE 24–14)
- YALE – Alex Galland, 20 yard field goal, 6:07 (YALE 27–14)

Fourth quarter

- DART – Dylan Mellor, 40 yard pass from Jack Heneghan (David Smith XP good), 6:10 (YALE 27–21)
- DART – Drew Hunnicut, 15 yard pass from Jack Heneghan (David Smith XP good), 0:34 (DART 28–27)

=== Holy Cross ===
Holy Cross vs. Yale – Game summary

Quarter	1	2	3	4	Total
Holy Cross	0	0	0	0	0
Yale	3	22	7	0	32

at Yale Bowl • New Haven, CT

- Date: October 14
- Game time: 1:00 p.m.
- Game weather: 66 °F (19 °C); mostly cloudy
- Game attendance: 8,709
- Referee: Steve Cadorette
- Box Score

Game information

First quarter

- (10:32) YALE - Alex Galland 39 yd field goal, (Drive 8 plays, 17 yards, 3:29; 3-0 Yale)

Second quarter

- (14:27) YALE - Michael Siragusa 5 yd pass from Kurt Rawlings (Alex Galland kick), (Drive 11 plays, 55 yards, 5:31; 10-0 Yale)
- (07:17) YALE - Zane Dudek 21 yd run (Alex Galland kick), (Drive 6 plays, 88 yards, 3:02; 17-0 Yale)
- (01:26) YALE - Matthew Oplinger safety, (19-0 Yale)
- (00:56) YALE - Michael Siragusa 33 yd pass from Kurt Rawlings (Alex Galland kick failed), (Drive 3 plays, 63 yards, 0:30; 25-0 Yale)

Third quarter

- (11:40) YALE - Zane Dudek 22 yd run (Alex Galland kick), (Drive 7 plays, 76 yards, 3:15; 32-0 Yale)

Fourth quarter

- no scoring

=== Penn ===
Yale vs. Penn – Game summary

Quarter	1	2	3	4	Total
Yale	7	11	0	6	24
Penn	7	3	0	9	19

at Franklin Field • Philadelphia, PA

- Date: October 21
- Game time: 1:00 p.m.
- Game weather: 72 °F (22 °C); sunny
- Game attendance: 6,408
- Referee: Tony Marcella
- Box Score

Game information

First quarter

- (09:21) PENN - Justin Watson 23 yd pass from Will Fischer-Colbrie (Jack Soslow kick) (Drive 8 plays, 76 yards, 3:50; 7-0 Penn)
- (02:32) YALE - Zane Dudek 8 yd run (Alex Galland kick), (Drive 5 plays, 42 yards, 1:53; 7-7 Tied)

Second quarter

- (13:00) PENN - Jack Soslow 34 yd field goal, (Drive 14 plays, 72 yards, 4:27; 10-7 Penn)
- (07:26) YALE - Alex Galland 35 yd field goal, (Drive 6 plays, 32 yards, 2:38; 10-10 Tied)
- (00:30) YALE - Reed Klubnik 13 yd pass from Kurt Rawlings (Andrew Johnson Pass to Matthew Oplinger for Two-Point Conversion), (Drive 4 plays, 53 yards, 1:40; 18-10 Yale)

Third quarter

- no scoring

Fourth quarter

- (10:51) PENN - Jack Soslow 44 yd field goal, (Drive 7 plays, 16 yards, 3:41; 18-3 Yale)
- (09:03) PENN - Tre Solomon 2 yd run (Will Fischer-Colbrie pass failed), (Drive 3 plays, 32 yards, 1:09; 19-18 Penn)
- (04:11) YALE - Christopher Williams-Lopez 4 yd pass from Kurt Rawlings (Kurt Rawlings pass failed), (Drive 11 plays, 80 yards, 4:52; 24-19 Yale)

=== Columbia ===
Columbia vs. Yale – Game summary

Quarter	1	2	3	4	Total
Columbia	0	0	6	0	6
Yale	13	0	3	7	23

at Yale Bowl • New Haven, CT

- Date: October 28
- Game time: 1:00 p.m.
- Game weather: 66 °F (19 °C); mostly sunny
- Game attendance: 15,422
- Referee: Jeff Pumphrey
- Box Score

Game information

First quarter

- (08:18) YALE - Jaeden Graham 10 yd pass from Andrew Johnson (Alex Galland kick), (Drive 10 plays, 71 yards, 3:18; 7-0 Yale)
- (02:48) YALE - Kurt Rawlings 1 yd run (Alex Galland kick blocked), (Drive 7 plays, 45 yards, 3:10; 13-0 Yale)

Second quarter

- no scoring

Third quarter

- (05:36) YALE - Alex Galland 37 yd field goal, (Drive 10 plays, 60 yards, 5:04; 16-0 Yale)
- (01:18) COL - Anders Hill 1 yd run (Kaleb Pitts pass intercepted Two-Point Pass Conversion Failed), (Drive 10 plays, 44 yards, 4:12; 16-6 Yale)

Fourth quarter

- (08:29) YALE - Michael Siragusa Jr. 9 yd pass from Kurt Rawlings (Alex Galland kick), (Drive 6 plays, 70 yards, 3:12; 23-6 Yale)

=== Brown ===
Brown vs. Yale – Game summary

Quarter	1	2	3	4	Total
Brown	0	0	0	7	7
Yale	20	7	7	0	34

at Yale Bowl • New Haven, CT

- Date: November 3
- Game time: 8:00 p.m.
- Game weather: 62 °F (17 °C); partly cloudy
- Game attendance: 8,216
- Referee: Todd Boyd
- Box Score

Game information

First quarter

- (11:41) YALE - Zane Dudek 68 yd run (Andrew Johnson pass failed), (Drive 2 plays, 68 yards, 0:46; 6-0 Yale)
- (06:52) YALE - JP Shohfi 21 yd pass from Kurt Rawlings (Alex Galland kick), (Drive 7 plays, 66 yards, 3:19; 13-0 Yale)
- (03:44) YALE - Zane Dudek 36 yd run (Alex Galland kick), (Drive 3 plays, 60 yards, 1:14; 20-0 Yale)

Second quarter

- (06:43) YALE - JP Shohfi 83 yd pass from Kurt Rawlings (Alex Galland kick), (Drive 4 plays, 93 yards, 1:13; 27-0 Yale)

Third quarter

- (09:34) YALE - Zane Dudek 7 yd run (Alex Galland kick), (Drive 8 plays, 80 yards, 3:09; 34-0 Yale)

Fourth quarter

- (01:43) BRWN - Livingstone Harriott 4 yd pass from Thomas Linta (Ben Rosenblatt kick), (Drive 9 plays, 86 yards, 3:42; 34-7 Yale)

=== Princeton ===
Yale vs. Princeton – Game summary

Quarter	1	2	3	4	Total
Yale	0	14	14	7	35
Princeton	7	17	7	0	31

at Powers Field at Princeton Stadium • Princeton, NJ

- Date: November 11
- Game time: 1:00 p.m.
- Game weather: 37 °F (3 °C); cold, clear
- Game attendance: 11,229
- Referee: Michael Sechris
- Box Score

Game information

First quarter

- (04:24) PRIN - Jesper Horsted 88 yd pass from Chad Kanoff (Tavish Rice kick), (Drive 2 plays, 89 yards, 0:47; 7-0 Princeton)

Second quarter

- (08:02) PRIN - Stephen Carlson 18 yd pass from Chad Kanoff (Tavish Rice kick), (Drive 4 plays, 53 yards, 1:04; 14-0 Princeton)
- (07:22) YALE - Zane Dudek 47 yd run (Alex Galland kick), (Drive 2 plays, 76 yards, 0:34; 14-7 Princeton)
- (03:07) PRIN - Tavish Rice 21 yd field goal, (Drive 11 plays, 63 yards, 4:07; 17-7 Princeton)
- (01:51) PRIN - Tiger Bech 58 yd pass from Chad Kanoff (Tavish Rice kick), (Drive 1 plays, 58 yards, 0:09; 24-7 Princeton)
- (01:22) YALE - Jaeden Graham 58 yd pass from Kurt Rawlings (Alex Galland kick), (Drive 3 plays, 77 yards, 0:22; 24-14 Princeton)

Third quarter

- (12:08) YALE - Ross Drwal 33 yd pass from Kurt Rawlings (Alex Galland kick), (Drive 4 plays, 35 yards, 2:13; 24-21 Princeton)
- (03:58) YALE - Zane Dudek 1 yd run (Alex Galland kick), (Drive 13 plays, 68 yards, 6:14; 28-24 Yale)
- (01:53) PRIN - Jesper Horsted 12 yd pass from Chad Kanoff (Tavish Rice kick), (Drive 5 plays, 77 yards, 1:58; 31-28 Princeton)

Fourth quarter

- (12:14) YALE - Zane Dudek 4 yd run (Alex Galland kick), (Drive 9 plays, 80 yards, 4:39; 35-31 Yale)

=== Harvard ("The Game") ===
Harvard vs. Yale – Game summary

Quarter	1	2	3	4	Total
Harvard	3	0	0	0	3
Yale	0	17	0	7	24

at Yale Bowl • New Haven, CT

- Date: November 18
- Game time: 12:30 p.m.
- Game weather: 45 °F (7 °C); cloudy
- Game attendance: 51,426
- Referee: Hank Johns
- Box Score

Game information

First quarter

- (07:23) HARV - Jake McIntyre 29 yd field goal, (Drive 11 plays, 50 yards, 5:55; 3-0 Harvard)

Second quarter

- (06:26) YALE - JP Shohfi 9 yd pass from Kurt Rawlings (Alex Galland kick), (Drive 4 plays, 54 yards, 1:38; 7-3 Yale)
- (05:31) YALE - Malcolm Dixon 19 yd fumble recovery (Alex Galland kick), 14-3 Yale)
- (00:00) YALE - Alex Galland 25 yd field goal, (Drive 11 plays, 31 yards, 4:24; 17-3 Yale)

Third quarter

- no scoring

Fourth quarter

- (12:04) YALE - Zane Dudek 2 yd run (Alex Galland kick), (Drive 8 plays, 81 yards, 4:50; 24-3 Yale)

== NFL draft ==
One Bulldog was selected in the 2018 NFL draft following the season.

Round	Pick	Player	Position	NFL team
6	200	Foyesade Oluokun	S	Atlanta Falcons
