= 2017 Fordham Rams football team =

American college football season

2017 Fordham Rams football
- Conference: Patriot League
- Record: 4–7 (3–3 Patriot)
- Head coach: Andrew Breiner (2nd season)
- Defensive coordinator: John Bowes (1st season)
- Home stadium: Coffey Field

2017 Patriot League football standings
	Conf.			Overall
Team	W		L	W		L
Colgate +	5	–	1	7	–	4
Lehigh +^	5	–	1	5	–	7
Holy Cross	3	–	3	4	–	7
Fordham	3	–	3	4	–	7
Lafayette	3	–	3	3	–	8
Bucknell	2	–	4	5	–	6
Georgetown	0	–	6	1	–	10
+ – Conference co-champions; ^ – FCS playoff participant

The 2017 Fordham Rams football team represented Fordham University as a member of the Patriot League during the 2017 NCAA Division I FCS football season. Led by second-year head coach Andrew Breiner, the Rams compiled an overall record of 4–7 with a mark of 3–3 in conference play, placing in a three-way tie for third in the Patriot League. Fordham played home games at Coffey Field in The Bronx.

On December 5, Breiner resigned to become the quarterbacks coach at Mississippi State. He finished his tenure at Fordham with a two-year record of 12–10.

== Schedule ==
The 2017 schedule consists of five home and six away games. The Rams will host Patriot League foes Lehigh, Holy Cross, and Bucknell, and will travel to Lafayette, Colgate, and Georgetown.

In 2017, Fordham's non-conference opponents will be Independent Army, Central Connecticut and Bryant of the Northeast Conference, Eastern Washington of the Big Sky Conference, and Yale of the Ivy League.

Date	Time	Opponent	Rank	Site	TV	Result	Attendance
September 1	6:00 p.m.	at Army*	No. 22	Michie Stadium; West Point, NY	CBSSN	L 6–64	22,333
September 9	1:00 p.m.	at Central Connecticut*		Arute Field; New Britain, CT	NECFR	W 38–31	4,414
September 16	1:00 p.m.	No. 12 Eastern Washington*		Coffey Field; Bronx, NY	STADIUM	L 21–56	3,029
September 23	1:00 p.m.	at Bryant*		Beirne Stadium; Smithfield, RI	NECFR	L 40–45	7,532
September 30	6:00 p.m.	Yale*		Coffey Field; Bronx, NY	STADIUM	L 10–41	3,988
October 7	3:30 p.m.	at Lafayette		Fisher Stadium; Easton, PA	STADIUM	L 10–14	4,659
October 14	1:00 p.m.	at Colgate		Crown Field at Andy Kerr Stadium; Hamilton, NY	STADIUM	L 12–38	2,622
October 21	2:00 p.m.	at Georgetown		Cooper Field; Washington, DC	STADIUM	W 17–9	2,500
October 28	1:00 p.m.	Lehigh		Coffey Field; Bronx, NY	STADIUM	W 45–35	7,962
November 4	1:00 p.m.	Holy Cross^{†}		Coffey Field; Bronx, NY (Ram–Crusader Cup)	STADIUM	L 20–42	5,467
November 18	1:00 p.m.	Bucknell		Coffey Field; Bronx, NY	STADIUM	W 20–9	2,961
*Non-conference game; ^{†}Homecoming; Rankings from STATS Poll released prior to the game; All times are in Eastern time

== Game summaries ==
=== At Army ===
	1	2	3	4	Total
No. 22 Rams	0	6	0	0	6
Black Knights	21	13	17	13	64

=== At Central Connecticut ===
	1	2	3	4	Total
Rams	7	14	7	10	38
Blue Devils	17	7	7	0	31

=== Eastern Washington ===
	1	2	3	4	Total
No. 12 Eagles	7	14	21	14	56
Rams	7	0	7	7	21

=== At Bryant ===
	1	2	3	4	Total
Rams	7	13	14	6	40
Bulldogs	13	3	15	14	45

=== Yale ===
	1	2	3	4	Total
Bulldogs	21	7	13	0	41
Rams	0	3	0	7	10

=== At Lafayette ===
	1	2	3	4	Total
Rams	0	7	3	0	10
Leopards	0	0	0	14	14

=== At Colgate ===
	1	2	3	4	Total
Rams	0	0	6	6	12
Raiders	14	3	7	14	38

=== At Georgetown ===
	1	2	3	4	Total
Rams	3	5	6	3	17
Hoyas	0	6	3	0	9

=== Lehigh ===
	1	2	3	4	Total
Mountain Hawks	7	7	7	14	35
Rams	7	7	14	17	45

=== Holy Cross ===
	1	2	3	4	Total
Crusaders	7	7	14	14	42
Rams	0	14	0	6	20

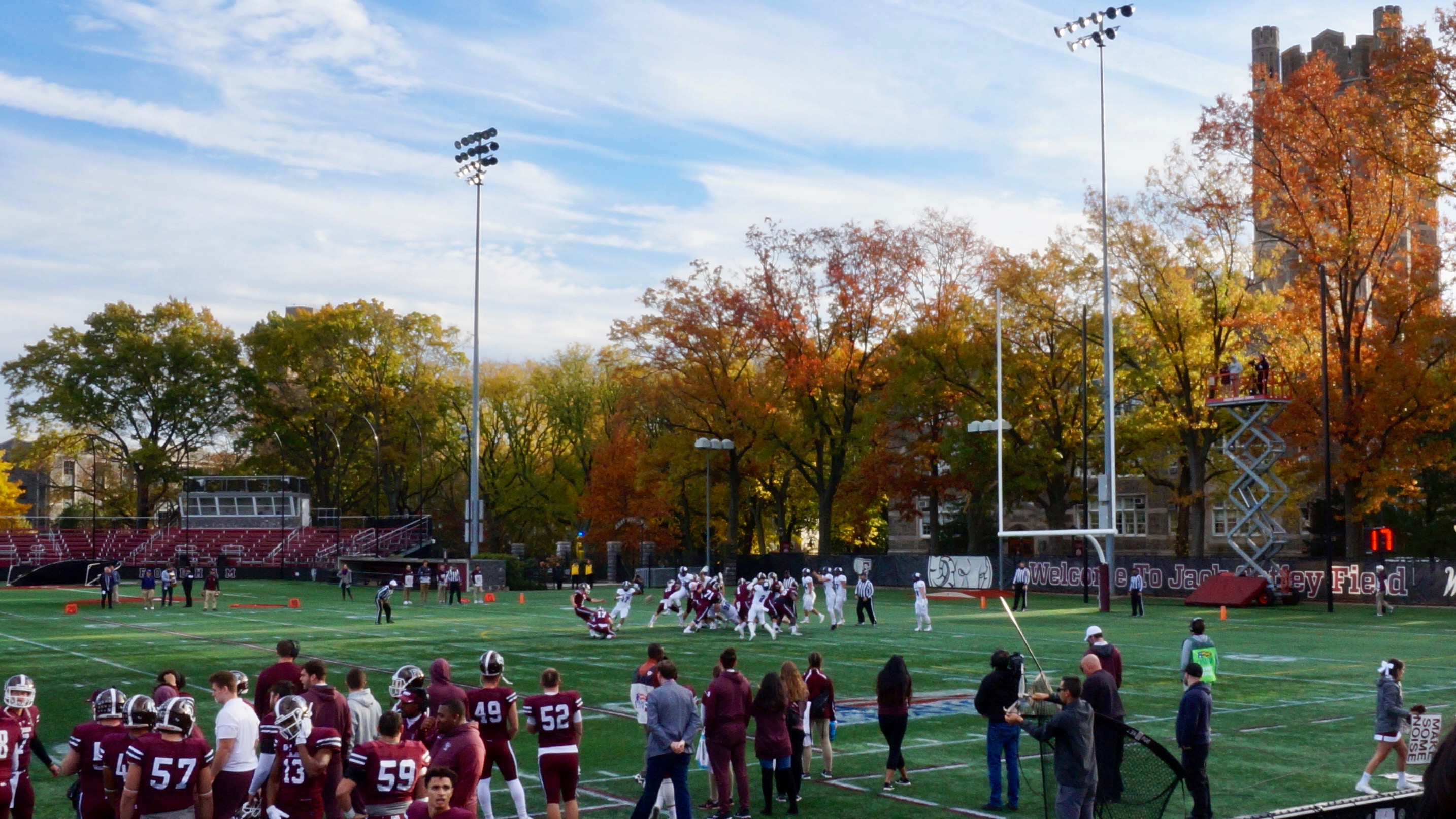
Fordham vs. Holy Cross

=== Bucknell ===
	1	2	3	4	Total
Bison	0	0	3	6	9
Rams	0	7	0	13	20

== Ranking movements ==
Ranking movements Legend: ██ Increase in ranking ██ Decrease in ranking — = Not ranked RV = Received votes
	Week													
Poll	Pre	1	2	3	4	5	6	7	8	9	10	11	12	Final
STATS FCS	22	RV	RV	RV	—	—	—	—	—	—	—	—	—	—
Coaches	RV	RV	—	—	—	—	—	—	—	—	—	—	—	—

== 2018 NFL draft ==
Player	Team	Round	Pick #	Position
Chase Edmonds	Arizona Cardinals	4th	134	RB
