= Phil Estes =

American football player and coach (born 1958)

Biographical details
- Born: June 7, 1958 (age 66); Cedar Rapids, Iowa, U.S.

Playing career

Football
- 1976–1979: New Hampshire
- Position(s): Offensive lineman

Coaching career (HC unless noted)

Football
- 1982–1983: Concord HS (NH) (OL)
- 1984–1990: New Hampshire (OL)
- 1991–1993: New Hampshire (OC)
- 1994–1996: Brown (RB/RC)
- 1997: Brown (WR/RC)
- 1998–2018: Brown

Baseball
- 1982–1983: Concord HS (NH) (assistant)

Basketball
- 1982–1983: Concord HS (NH) (assistant)

Head coaching record
- Overall: 115–94

Accomplishments and honors

Championships
- 3 Ivy League (1999, 2005, 2008)

Awards
- First-team All-Yankee Conference (1979); New England Coach of the Year (2005)

Philip D. Estes (born June 7, 1958) is an American college football coach and former player. He was the head football coach at Brown University from December 1997 until stepping down in November 2018. Estes compiled a 115–94 record during his tenure at Brown University. He was the most successful coach at Brown University since the inception of the Ivy League in 1956. His three Ivy League championships are also the most of any Brown coach in the Ivy League era.

Estes is an alumnus of the University of New Hampshire and a former offensive lineman on the Wildcat's football team. Prior to receiving the head coach position at Brown, Estes served as an assistant at New Hampshire and Brown, as well as a high school coach.

== Head coaching record ==
Year	Team	Overall	Conference	Standing	Bowl/playoffs
Brown Bears (Ivy League) (1998–2018)
1998	Brown	7–3	5–2	T–2nd	
1999	Brown	9–1	6–1	T–1st	
2000	Brown	7–3	4–3	T–3rd	
2001	Brown	6–3	5–2	3rd	
2002	Brown	2–8	2–5	T–6th	
2003	Brown	5–5	4–3	T–2nd	
2004	Brown	6–4	3–4	T–4th	
2005	Brown	9–1	6–1	1st	
2006	Brown	3–7	2–5	T–6th	
2007	Brown	5–5	4–3	3rd	
2008	Brown	7–3	6–1	T–1st	
2009	Brown	6–4	4–3	3rd	
2010	Brown	6–4	5–2	T–2nd	
2011	Brown	7–3	4–3	T–2nd	
2012	Brown	7–3	4–3	T–3rd	
2013	Brown	6–4	3–4	T–4th	
2014	Brown	5–5	3–4	5th	
2015	Brown	5–5	3–4	T–4th	
2016	Brown	4–6	3–4	T–4th	
2017	Brown	2–8	0–7	8th	
2018	Brown	1–9	0–7	8th	
Brown:		115–94	76–71		
Total:		115–94			
National championship Conference title Conference division title or championship game berth
