= 2017 Lafayette Leopards football team =

American college football season

2017 Lafayette Leopards football
- Conference: Patriot League
- Record: 3–8 (3–3 Patriot)
- Head coach: John Garrett (1st season)
- Home stadium: Fisher Stadium

2017 Patriot League football standings
	Conf.			Overall
Team	W		L	W		L
Colgate +	5	–	1	7	–	4
Lehigh +^	5	–	1	5	–	7
Holy Cross	3	–	3	4	–	7
Fordham	3	–	3	4	–	7
Lafayette	3	–	3	3	–	8
Bucknell	2	–	4	5	–	6
Georgetown	0	–	6	1	–	10
+ – Conference co-champions; ^ – FCS playoff participant

The 2017 Lafayette Leopards football team represented Lafayette College as member of the Patriot League during the 2017 NCAA Division I FCS football season. Led by first-year head coach John Garrett, the Leopards compiled an overall record of 3–8 with a mark of 3–3 in conference play, placing in a three-way tie for third in the Patriot League. Lafayette played home games at Fisher Field in Easton, Pennsylvania.

== Schedule ==
The 2017 schedule consisted of five home and six away games. The Leopards hosted Patriot League foes Sacred Heart, Fordham, Bucknell, and Colgate, and traveled to Holy Cross, Georgetown, and Lehigh for the 153rd meeting of The Rivalry. Lafayette's non-conference opponents were Monmouth of the Big South Conference, Villanova of the Colonial Athletic Association, and Princeton and Harvard of the Ivy League.

Date	Time	Opponent	Site	TV	Result	Attendance
September 2	3:00 p.m.	at Monmouth*	Kessler Field; West Long Branch, NJ	ESPN3	L 12–31	3,898
September 9	6:00 p.m.	Sacred Heart	Fisher Stadium; Easton, PA	Stadium, WBPH-TV	L 24–38	4,923
September 16	6:00 p.m.	at No. 7 Villanova*	Villanova Stadium; Villanova, PA	ESPN3, WBPH-TV	L 0–59	9,671
September 23	6:00 p.m.	Princeton*	Fisher Stadium; Easton, PA	Stadium, WBPH-TV	L 17–38	7,239
September 30	1:05 p.m.	at Holy Cross	Fitton Field; Worcester, MA	MASN, Stadium, WBPH-TV	W 10–7	7,764
October 7	3:30 p.m.	Fordham	Fisher Stadium; Easton, PA	Stadium, WBPH-TV	W 14–10	4,659
October 14	1:00 p.m.	at Harvard*	Harvard Stadium; Boston, MA	ILN, NESN	L 10–38	10,025
October 21	3:30 p.m.	Bucknell^{†}	Fisher Stadium; Easton, PA	Stadium, WBPH-TV	L 7–13 ^{OT}	5,512
November 4	2:00 p.m.	at Georgetown	Cooper Field; Washington, DC	Stadium	W 7–0	1,750
November 11	12:30 p.m.	Colgate	Fisher Stadium; Easton, PA	Stadium, WBPH-TV	L 0–27	5,612
November 18	12:30 p.m.	at Lehigh	Goodman Stadium; Bethlehem, PA (The Rivalry)	Stadium, WBPH-TV, WFMZ	L 31–38	15,270
*Non-conference game; ^{†}Homecoming; Rankings from STATS Poll released prior to the game; All times are in Eastern time
