= 2017 Holy Cross Crusaders football team =

American college football season

2017 Holy Cross Crusaders football
- Conference: Patriot League
- Record: 4–7 (3–3 Patriot)
- Head coach: Tom Gilmore (14th season; first 7 games); Brian Rock (interim, final 4 games)
- Offensive coordinator: Brian Rock (3rd season)
- Defensive coordinator: Mike Kashurba (4th season)
- Home stadium: Fitton Field

2017 Patriot League football standings
	Conf.			Overall
Team	W		L	W		L
Colgate +	5	–	1	7	–	4
Lehigh +^	5	–	1	5	–	7
Holy Cross	3	–	3	4	–	7
Fordham	3	–	3	4	–	7
Lafayette	3	–	3	3	–	8
Bucknell	2	–	4	5	–	6
Georgetown	0	–	6	1	–	10
+ – Conference co-champions; ^ – FCS playoff participant

The 2017 Holy Cross Crusaders football team represented the College of the Holy Cross as a member of the Patriot League during the 2017 NCAA Division I FCS football season. Holy Cross was led by 14th-year head coach Tom Gilmore for the first seven games of the season before he was fired following a 2–5 start. Offensive coordinator Brian Rock was named interim head coach for the final four games. The team finished the season with an overall record of 4–7 and a mark of 3–3 in Patriot League play to place three-way tie for third. The Crusaders played their home games at Fitton Field in Worcester, Massachusetts.

== Schedule ==
The 2017 schedule consisted of five home and six away games. The Crusaders hosted Patriot League foes Lafayette, Colgate, and Georgetown. They traveled to Bucknell, Fordham, and Lehigh.

In 2017, Holy Cross played non-conference opponents UConn of the American Athletic Conference, New Hampshire of the Colonial Athletic Association, Dartmouth and Yale of the Ivy League, and Monmouth of the Big South Conference.

Date	Time	Opponent	Rank	Site	TV	Result	Attendance
August 31	7:30 p.m.	at UConn*		Rentschler Field; East Hartford, CT	SNY	L 20–27	24,435
September 9	Noon	at Bucknell		Christy Mathewson–Memorial Stadium; Lewisburg, PA	STADIUM	W 20–0	1,987
September 16	1:00 p.m.	No. 9 New Hampshire*		Fitton Field; Worcester, MA	Charter TV3	W 51–26	7,906
September 23	7:00 p.m.	at Dartmouth*	No. 25	Memorial Field; Hanover, NH	ILN	L 26–27 ^{OT}	7,094
September 30	1:00 p.m.	Lafayette^{†}		Fitton Field; Worcester, MA	Charter TV3	L 7–10	7,764
October 7	1:00 p.m.	Monmouth*		Fitton Field; Worcester, MA	Charter TV3	L 36–48	4,484
October 14	1:00 p.m.	at Yale*		Yale Bowl; New Haven, CT	ILN	L 0–32	8,709
October 21	Noon	Colgate		Fitton Field; Worcester, MA	STADIUM	L 7–45	6,784
October 28	1:00 p.m.	Georgetown		Fitton Field; Worcester, MA	Charter TV3	W 24–10	9,063
November 4	1:00 p.m.	at Fordham		Coffey Field; Bronx, NY (Ram–Crusader Cup)	STADIUM	W 42–20	5,467
November 11	12:30 p.m.	at Lehigh		Goodman Stadium; Bethlehem, PA	STADIUM	L 21–34	7,247
*Non-conference game; ^{†}Homecoming; Rankings from STATS Poll released prior to the game; All times are in Eastern time

== Game summaries ==
=== At UConn ===
	1	2	3	4	Total
Crusaders	3	17	0	0	20
Huskies	7	0	7	13	27

=== At Bucknell ===
	1	2	3	4	Total
Crusaders	10	3	7	0	20
Bison	0	0	0	0	0

=== New Hampshire ===
	1	2	3	4	Total
No. 9 Wildcats	7	0	12	7	26
Crusaders	3	13	21	14	51

=== At Dartmouth ===
	1	2	3	4	OT	Total
No. 25 Crusaders	0	14	0	6	6	26
Big Green	7	6	7	0	7	27

=== Lafayette ===
	1	2	3	4	Total
Leopards	0	0	7	3	10
Crusaders	0	7	0	0	7

=== Monmouth ===
	1	2	3	4	Total
Hawks	0	21	20	7	48
Crusaders	3	14	0	19	36

=== At Yale ===
	1	2	3	4	Total
Crusaders	0	0	0	0	0
Bulldogs	3	22	7	0	32

=== Colgate ===
	1	2	3	4	Total
Raiders	7	10	21	7	45
Crusaders	7	0	0	0	7

=== Georgetown ===
	1	2	3	4	Total
Hoyas	3	0	7	0	10
Crusaders	0	13	0	11	24

=== At Fordham ===
	1	2	3	4	Total
Crusaders	0	7	0	14	21
Mountain Hawks	14	0	10	10	34

=== At Lehigh ===
	1	2	3	4	Total
Crusaders	0	7	0	14	21
Mountain Hawks	14	0	10	10	34

== Ranking movements ==
Ranking movements Legend: ██ Increase in ranking ██ Decrease in ranking — = Not ranked RV = Received votes
	Week													
Poll	Pre	1	2	3	4	5	6	7	8	9	10	11	12	Final
STATS FCS	—	—	—	25	RV	—	—	—	—	—	—	—	—	—
Coaches	—	—	—	25	RV	—	—	—	—	—	—	—	—	—
