= 2017 Colgate Raiders football team =

American college football season

2017 Colgate Raiders football

Patriot League co-champion
- Conference: Patriot League
- Record: 7–4 (5–1 Patriot)
- Head coach: Dan Hunt (4th season)
- Offensive coordinator: Chris Young (4th season)
- Defensive coordinator: Paul Shaffner (5th season)
- Home stadium: Crown Field at Andy Kerr Stadium

2017 Patriot League football standings
	Conf.			Overall
Team	W		L	W		L
Colgate +	5	–	1	7	–	4
Lehigh +^	5	–	1	5	–	7
Holy Cross	3	–	3	4	–	7
Fordham	3	–	3	4	–	7
Lafayette	3	–	3	3	–	8
Bucknell	2	–	4	5	–	6
Georgetown	0	–	6	1	–	10
+ – Conference co-champions; ^ – FCS playoff participant

The 2017 Colgate Raiders football team represented Colgate University in the 2017 NCAA Division I FCS football season. They were led by fourth-year head coach Dan Hunt and played their home games at Crown Field at Andy Kerr Stadium. They were a member of the Patriot League. They finished the season 7–4, 5–1 in Patriot League play to finish in a tie for the Patriot League championship with Lehigh. Due to their head-to-head loss to Lehigh, they did not receive a bid to the FCS Playoffs.

== Schedule ==
Date	Time	Opponent	Site	TV	Result	Attendance
August 26	7:00 p.m.	at No. 23 Cal Poly*	Alex G. Spanos Stadium; San Luis Obispo, CA	ESPNU	W 20–14	8,428
September 9	1:00 p.m.	No. 9 Richmond*^{†}	Crown Field at Andy Kerr Stadium; Hamilton, NY	STADIUM	L 17–20	6,994
September 16	6:00 p.m.	at Buffalo*	University at Buffalo Stadium; Amherst, NY	ESPN3	L 10–33	11,546
September 23	1:00 p.m.	Furman*	Crown Field at Andy Kerr Stadium; Hamilton, NY	STADIUM	L 14–45	4,119
September 30	1:30 p.m.	at Cornell*	Schoellkopf Field; Ithaca, NY (rivalry)	ILN	W 21–7	3,325
October 7	1:00 p.m.	Lehigh	Crown Field at Andy Kerr Stadium; Hamilton, NY	STADIUM	L 38–41	2,986
October 14	Noon	Fordham	Crown Field at Andy Kerr Stadium; Hamilton, NY	STADIUM	W 38–12	2,622
October 21	Noon	at Holy Cross	Fitton Field; Worcester, MA	STADIUM	W 45–7	6,784
October 28	1:00 p.m.	Bucknell	Crown Field at Andy Kerr Stadium; Hamilton, NY	STADIUM	W 40–3	6,763
November 11	12:30 p.m.	at Lafayette	Fisher Stadium; Easton, PA	STADIUM	W 27–0	5,612
November 18	1:00 p.m.	at Georgetown	Cooper Field; Washington, DC	STADIUM	W 35–10	2,211
*Non-conference game; ^{†}Homecoming; Rankings from STATS Poll released prior to the game; All times are in Eastern time

== Game summaries ==
=== At Cal Poly ===
	1	2	3	4	Total
Raiders	10	7	3	0	20
No. 23 Mustangs	0	0	0	14	14

=== Richmond ===
	1	2	3	4	Total
No. 9 Spiders	0	7	0	13	20
Raiders	0	7	7	3	17

=== At Buffalo ===
	1	2	3	4	Total
Raiders	3	0	7	0	10
Bulls	20	10	0	3	33

=== Furman ===
	1	2	3	4	Total
Paladins	21	17	7	0	45
Raiders	0	7	7	0	14

=== At Cornell ===
	1	2	3	4	Total
Raiders	0	14	0	7	21
Big Red	0	0	7	0	7

=== Lehigh ===
	1	2	3	4	Total
Mountain Hawks	14	7	7	13	41
Raiders	7	21	0	10	38

=== Fordham ===
	1	2	3	4	Total
Rams	0	0	6	6	12
Raiders	14	3	7	14	38

=== At Holy Cross ===
	1	2	3	4	Total
Raiders	7	10	21	7	45
Crusaders	7	0	0	0	7

=== Bucknell ===
	1	2	3	4	Total
Bison	3	0	0	0	3
Raiders	6	27	0	7	40

=== At Lafayette ===
	1	2	3	4	Total
Raiders	0	14	13	0	27
Leopards	0	0	0	0	0

=== At Georgetown ===
	1	2	3	4	Total
Raiders	7	14	14	0	35
Hoyas	10	0	0	0	10

== Ranking movements ==
Ranking movements Legend: ██ Increase in ranking ██ Decrease in ranking — = Not ranked RV = Received votes
	Week													
Poll	Pre	1	2	3	4	5	6	7	8	9	10	11	12	Final
STATS FCS	—	RV	RV	RV	RV	RV	RV	RV	—	—	—	—	—	—
Coaches	—	25	RV	—	—	—	—	—	—	—	—	—	—	—
