= 2017 Georgetown Hoyas football team =

American college football season

2017 Georgetown Hoyas football
- Conference: Patriot League
- Record: 1–10 (0–6 Patriot)
- Head coach: Rob Sgarlata (4th season)
- Offensive coordinator: Michael Neuberger (4th season)
- Defensive coordinator: Kevin Doherty (1st season)
- Home stadium: Cooper Field

Uniform
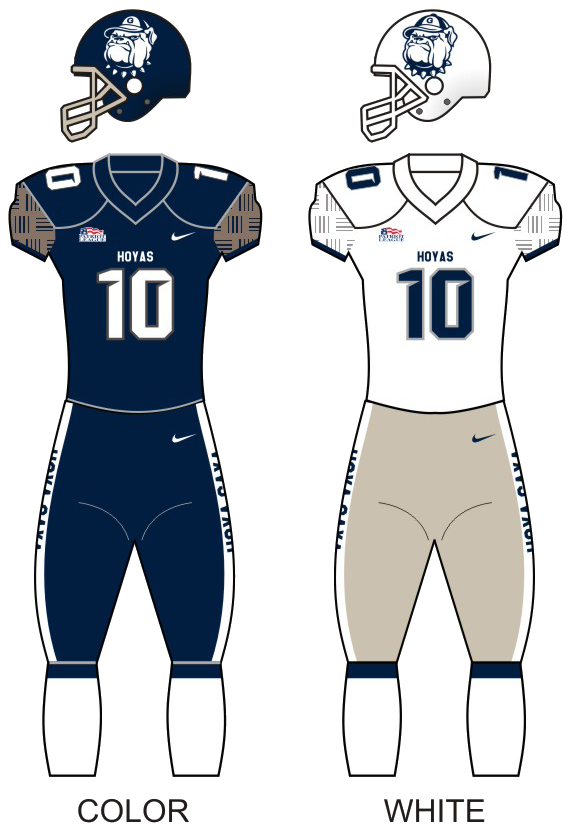

2017 Patriot League football standings
	Conf.			Overall
Team	W		L	W		L
Colgate +	5	–	1	7	–	4
Lehigh +^	5	–	1	5	–	7
Holy Cross	3	–	3	4	–	7
Fordham	3	–	3	4	–	7
Lafayette	3	–	3	3	–	8
Bucknell	2	–	4	5	–	6
Georgetown	0	–	6	1	–	10
+ – Conference co-champions; ^ – FCS playoff participant

The 2017 Georgetown Hoyas football team represented Georgetown University as a member of the Patriot League during the 2017 NCAA Division I FCS football season. Led by fourth-year head coach Rob Sgarlata, the Hoyas compiled an overall record of 1–10 with a mark of 0–6 in conference play, placing last out of seven teams in the Patriot League. Georgetown played home games at Cooper Field in Washington, D.C.

== Schedule ==
The 2017 schedule consisted of five home and six away games. The Hoyas hosted Patriot League foes Fordham, Lafayette, and Colgate, and will travel to Lehigh, Holy Cross, and Bucknell. Georgetown's non-conference opponents were Campbell and Marist of the Pioneer Football League, and Columbia, Harvard, and Princeton of the Ivy League.

Date	Time	Opponent	Site	TV	Result	Attendance
September 9	6:00 p.m.	at Campbell*	Barker–Lane Stadium; Buies Creek, NC	BSN	W 16–10	5,853
September 16	1:00 p.m.	Marist*	Cooper Field; Washington, DC	STADIUM	L 12–14	1,112
September 23	1:00 p.m.	at Columbia*	Robert K. Kraft Field at Lawrence A. Wien Stadium; New York, NY (Lou Little Cup)	SNY	L 14–35	4,101
September 30	2:00 p.m.	Harvard*	RFK Stadium; Washington, DC	STADIUM	L 2–41	3,256
October 7	1:00 p.m.	at Princeton*	Powers Field at Princeton Stadium; Princeton, NJ	ESPN3	L 30–50	4,466
October 14	12:30 p.m.	at Lehigh	Goodman Stadium; Bethlehem, PA	STADIUM	L 35–54	4,438
October 21	2:00 p.m.	Fordham	Cooper Field; Washington, DC	STADIUM	L 9–17	2,500
October 28	1:00 p.m.	at Holy Cross	Fitton Field; Worcester, MA	STADIUM	L 10–24	9,063
November 4	2:00 p.m.	Lafayette^{†}	Cooper Field; Washington, DC	STADIUM	L 0–7	1,750
November 11	12:00 p.m.	at Bucknell	Christy Mathewson–Memorial Stadium; Lewisburg, PA	STADIUM	L 0–12	1,794
November 18	1:00 p.m.	Colgate	Cooper Field; Washington, DC	STADIUM	L 10–35	2,211
*Non-conference game; ^{†}Homecoming; All times are in Eastern time

== Game summaries ==
=== At Campbell ===
	1	2	3	4	Total
Hoyas	3	0	7	6	16
Fighting Camels	0	0	7	3	10

=== Marist ===
	1	2	3	4	Total
Red Foxes	7	7	0	0	14
Hoyas	0	0	6	6	12

=== At Columbia ===
	1	2	3	4	Total
Hoyas	0	0	0	14	14
Lions	0	21	0	14	35

=== Harvard ===
	1	2	3	4	Total
Crimson	14	17	3	7	41
Hoyas	0	2	0	0	2

=== At Princeton ===
	1	2	3	4	Total
Hoyas	10	0	6	14	30
Tigers	17	19	14	0	50

=== At Lehigh ===
	1	2	3	4	Total
Hoyas	0	14	7	14	35
Mountain Hawks	7	27	10	10	54

=== Fordham ===
	1	2	3	4	Total
Rams	3	5	6	3	17
Hoyas	0	6	3	0	9

=== At Holy Cross ===
	1	2	3	4	Total
Hoyas	3	0	7	0	10
Crusaders	0	13	0	11	24

=== Lafayette ===
	1	2	3	4	Total
Leopards	0	7	0	0	7
Hoyas	0	0	0	0	0

=== At Bucknell ===
	1	2	3	4	Total
Hoyas	0	0	0	0	0
Bison	0	3	9	0	12

=== Colgate ===
	1	2	3	4	Total
Raiders	7	14	14	0	35
Hoyas	10	0	0	0	10
