= 2017 Lehigh Mountain Hawks football team =

American college football season

2017 Lehigh Mountain Hawks football

Patriot League co-champion

FCS Playoffs First Round, L 29–59 vs. Stony Brook
- Conference: Patriot League
- Record: 5–7 (5–1 Patriot)
- Head coach: Andy Coen (12th season)
- Offensive coordinator: Scott Brisson (1st season)
- Defensive coordinator: Joe Bottiglieri (4th season)
- Home stadium: Goodman Stadium

2017 Patriot League football standings
	Conf.			Overall
Team	W		L	W		L
Colgate +	5	–	1	7	–	4
Lehigh +^	5	–	1	5	–	7
Holy Cross	3	–	3	4	–	7
Fordham	3	–	3	4	–	7
Lafayette	3	–	3	3	–	8
Bucknell	2	–	4	5	–	6
Georgetown	0	–	6	1	–	10
+ – Conference co-champions; ^ – FCS playoff participant

The 2017 Lehigh Mountain Hawks football team represented Lehigh University in the 2017 NCAA Division I FCS football season. The Mountain Hawks were led by 12th-year head coach Andy Coen and played their home games at Goodman Stadium. They were a member of the Patriot League. They finished the season 5–7, 5–1 in Patriot League play to finish in a tie for the Patriot League championship with Colgate. Due to their head-to-head win over Colgate, Lehigh received the Patriot League's automatic bid to the FCS Playoffs where they lost to Stony Brook in the first round.

== Schedule ==
Date	Time	Opponent	Rank	Site	TV	Result	Attendance
September 2	12:30 p.m.	No. 10 Villanova*	No. 17	Goodman Stadium; Bethlehem, PA	SE2	L 35–38	5,816
September 9	1:00 p.m.	at Monmouth*	No. 19	Kessler Field; West Long Branch, NJ	ESPN3	L 27–46	2,839
September 16	12:30 p.m.	Yale*		Goodman Stadium; Bethlehem, PA	SE2	L 28–56	4,996
September 23	12:30 p.m.	Penn*		Goodman Stadium; Bethlehem, PA	SE2	L 47–65	5,060
September 30	6:00 p.m.	at Wagner*		Wagner College Stadium; Staten Island, NY	NECFR	L 20–37	2,073
October 7	1:00 p.m.	at Colgate		Crown Field at Andy Kerr Stadium; Hamilton, NY	Stadium	W 41–38	2,986
October 14	12:30 p.m.	Georgetown		Goodman Stadium; Bethlehem, PA	SE2, Stadium	W 54–35	4,438
October 28	1:00 p.m.	at Fordham		Coffey Field; Bronx, NY	Stadium	L 35-45	7,962
November 4	12:00 p.m.	at Bucknell		Christy Mathewson–Memorial Stadium; Lewisburg, PA	Stadium	W 42–21	4,226
November 11	12:30 p.m.	Holy Cross		Goodman Stadium; Bethlehem, PA	SE2, Stadium	W 34–21	7,247
November 18	12:30 p.m.	Lafayette		Goodman Stadium; Bethlehem, PA (The Rivalry)	Stadium, WFMZ	W 38–31	15,270
November 25	2:00 p.m.	at No. 10 Stony Brook*		Kenneth P. LaValle Stadium; Stony Brook, NY (NCAA Division I First Round)	ESPN3	L 29–59	4,131
*Non-conference game; Rankings from STATS Poll released prior to the game; All times are in Eastern time

== Game summaries ==
=== Villanova ===
	1	2	3	4	Total
No. 10 Wildcats	7	21	7	3	38
No. 17 Mountain Hawks	7	7	14	7	35

=== At Monmouth ===
	1	2	3	4	Total
No. 19 Mountain Hawks	14	7	6	0	27
Hawks	14	6	13	13	46

=== Yale (Yank Townsend Trophy) ===
	1	2	3	4	Total
Bulldogs	14	14	14	14	56
Mountain Hawks	7	6	8	7	28

=== Penn ===
	1	2	3	4	Total
Quakers	14	21	14	16	65
Mountain Hawks	14	14	7	12	47

=== At Wagner ===
	1	2	3	4	Total
Mountain Hawks	7	7	6	0	20
Seahawks	7	10	14	6	37

=== At Colgate ===
	1	2	3	4	Total
Mountain Hawks	14	7	7	13	41
Raiders	7	21	0	10	38

=== Georgetown ===
	1	2	3	4	Total
Hoyas	0	14	7	14	35
Mountain Hawks	7	27	10	10	54

=== At Fordham ===
	1	2	3	4	Total
Mountain Hawks	7	7	7	14	35
Rams	7	7	14	17	45

=== At Bucknell ===
	1	2	3	4	Total
Mountain Hawks	28	7	7	0	42
Bison	7	7	0	7	21

=== Holy Cross ===
	1	2	3	4	Total
Crusaders	0	7	0	14	21
Mountain Hawks	14	0	10	10	34

=== Lafayette ===
	1	2	3	4	Total
Leopards	7	17	7	0	31
Mountain Hawks	14	0	14	10	38

== FCS Playoffs ==
=== At Stony Brook–First Round ===
	1	2	3	4	Total
Mountain Hawks	0	14	7	8	29
No. 10 Seawolves	0	24	14	21	59

== Ranking movements ==
Ranking movements Legend: ██ Increase in ranking ██ Decrease in ranking — = Not ranked RV = Received votes
	Week													
Poll	Pre	1	2	3	4	5	6	7	8	9	10	11	12	Final
STATS FCS	17	19	RV	—	—	—	—	—	—	—	—	—	—	RV
Coaches	17	19	RV	—	—	—	—	—	—	—	—	—	—	—
