= Lance Guidry =

American football player and coach (born 1971)

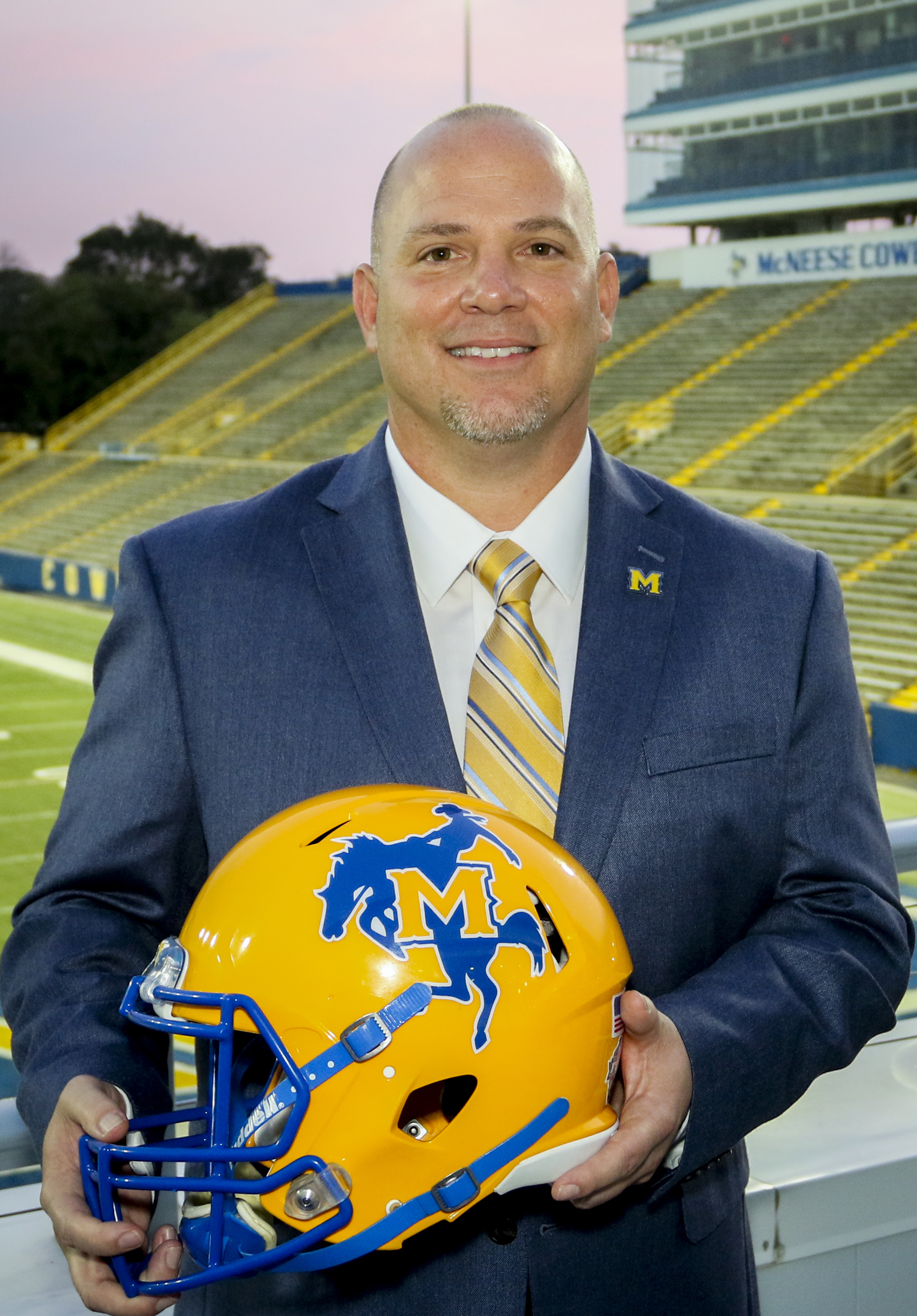

Current position
- Title: Defensive coordinator
- Team: Memphis
- Conference: American

Biographical details
- Born: March 25, 1971 (age 55); Welsh, Louisiana, U.S.

Playing career
- 1990–1993: McNeese State
- Position: Defensive back

Coaching career (HC unless noted)
- 1994: McNeese State (GA)
- 1995–1996: Leesville HS (LA) (DB)
- 1997–1999: Carencro HS (LA) (DC)
- 2000–2001: McNeese State (DB)
- 2002–2003: McNeese State (DC/DB)
- 2005–2007: Carencro HS (LA)
- 2008: McNeese State (DB)
- 2009–2010: Miami (OH) (DB)
- 2010: Miami (OH) (interim HC)
- 2011–2012: Western Kentucky (DC)
- 2012: Western Kentucky (interim HC)
- 2013–2015: McNeese State (AHC/DC)
- 2016–2018: McNeese State
- 2019: Southeastern Louisiana (DC)
- 2020: Florida Atlantic (S)
- 2021–2022: Marshall (DC/S)
- 2023–2024: Miami (FL) (DC)
- 2025: LSU (DA)
- 2026–present: Memphis (DC)

Head coaching record
- Overall: 22–13
- Bowls: 1–1

Lance Guidry (born March 25, 1971) is an American football coach and former player. He is the defensive coordinator at Memphis. He was previously a defensive analyst at Louisiana State University in 2025 and the defensive coordinator at the University of Miami in Coral Gables, Florida from 2023 to 2024. Guidry served as the head football coach at McNeese State University, his alma mater, from 2016 to 2018. He was also the interim head football coach at Miami University in Oxford, Ohio for one game in 2010 and at Western Kentucky University for one game in 2012. Guidry played college football as a defensive back at McNeese State from 1990 to 1993. He was a four-year starter, a team captain, and a two-time All-Southland Conference selection. Guidry ranks 17th on the McNeese all-time tackle leader board and also 10th in interceptions.

== Coaching career ==
=== Miami (OH) ===
Guidry served as defensive backs coach for Miami during its 2010 MAC championship season. That season Miami orchestrated the second largest turnaround in the history of college football going 10–4 after winning just one game (1–11) the year before. Head coach Michael Haywood left the team prior to the team's bowl game. Guidry served as interim head coach for Go-Daddy.com Bowl, leading the Redhawks to a 35–21 victory over Middle Tennessee.

=== Western Kentucky ===
After the Go-Daddy.com Bowl victory, Guidry became defensive coordinator at Western Kentucky University. By his second season (2012), Guidry's defense was #1 in the Sun Belt Conference and 26th nationally. That year Western Kentucky earned its first-ever bowl invite (Little Caesar's Bowl) since its transition to the FBS Level. Head Coach Willie Taggart left prior to the Little Caesar's Bowl, and once again Guidry was tabbed as the Interim Head Coach for the bowl game, where the Hilltoppers lost a tight game to Central Michigan in the waning minutes of the 4th quarter (24–21).

=== McNeese State ===
In 2013, Guidry returned to his alma mater to become the defensive coordinator for the Cowboys. Guidry's presence was immediately felt as McNeese won 10 games for the first time in six years and made the FCS playoffs for the first time in four years. In his third season, Guidry's defense ranked 12th nationally in total defense, 3rd in scoring defense and 4th in rushing defense - leading the way for McNeese's perfect regular season (10–0) and 2015 Southland Conference Championship.

After the 2015 season, head coach Matt Viator left McNeese to become head coach at Louisiana-Monroe and Guidry was named as the 15th head coach in McNeese State history. After three winning seasons, on November 20, 2018, it was announced that Guidry's contract would not be renewed.

=== After McNeese ===
Guidry spent the 2019 season as the defensive coordinator at Southeastern Louisiana. The following season, Guidry re-united with Willie Taggart as the safeties coach on Taggart's Florida Atlantic staff.

=== Marshall ===
In January 2021, it was announced that Guidry would be joining Charles Huff's inaugural staff at Marshall University as the Thundering Herd's defensive coordinator.

Guidry's 2022 Marshall defense finished the season ranked in the top 10 nationally in 12 different defensive categories, helping guide the Herd to an 8–4 regular season record.

=== Tulane ===
On January 20, 2023, it was announced that Guidry was hired as the defensive coordinator for the 2023 Tulane Green Wave football team, replacing the outgoing Chris Hampton.

=== Miami ===
However, on February 7, 2023, the Associated Press reported that the University of Miami would be hiring him as defensive coordinator. Over two seasons at Miami, the Hurricanes posted records of 7–6 in 2023 and 10–3 in 2024. Despite the improved record, much of the success in 2024 was attributed to Heisman runner-up quarterback Cam Ward, whose stellar play carried the team. Meanwhile, the defense, under Guidry’s leadership, struggled significantly, giving up 42 points each to Syracuse during the final regular season and Iowa State in the Pop-Tarts Bowl. The defensive unit’s poor performance became a focal point of fan criticism. On December 31, 2024, the University of Miami announced that Guidry had been fired as the team’s defensive coordinator.

=== LSU ===
On January 28, 2025, it was announced that Guidry was hired as a defensive analyst for the LSU Tigers.

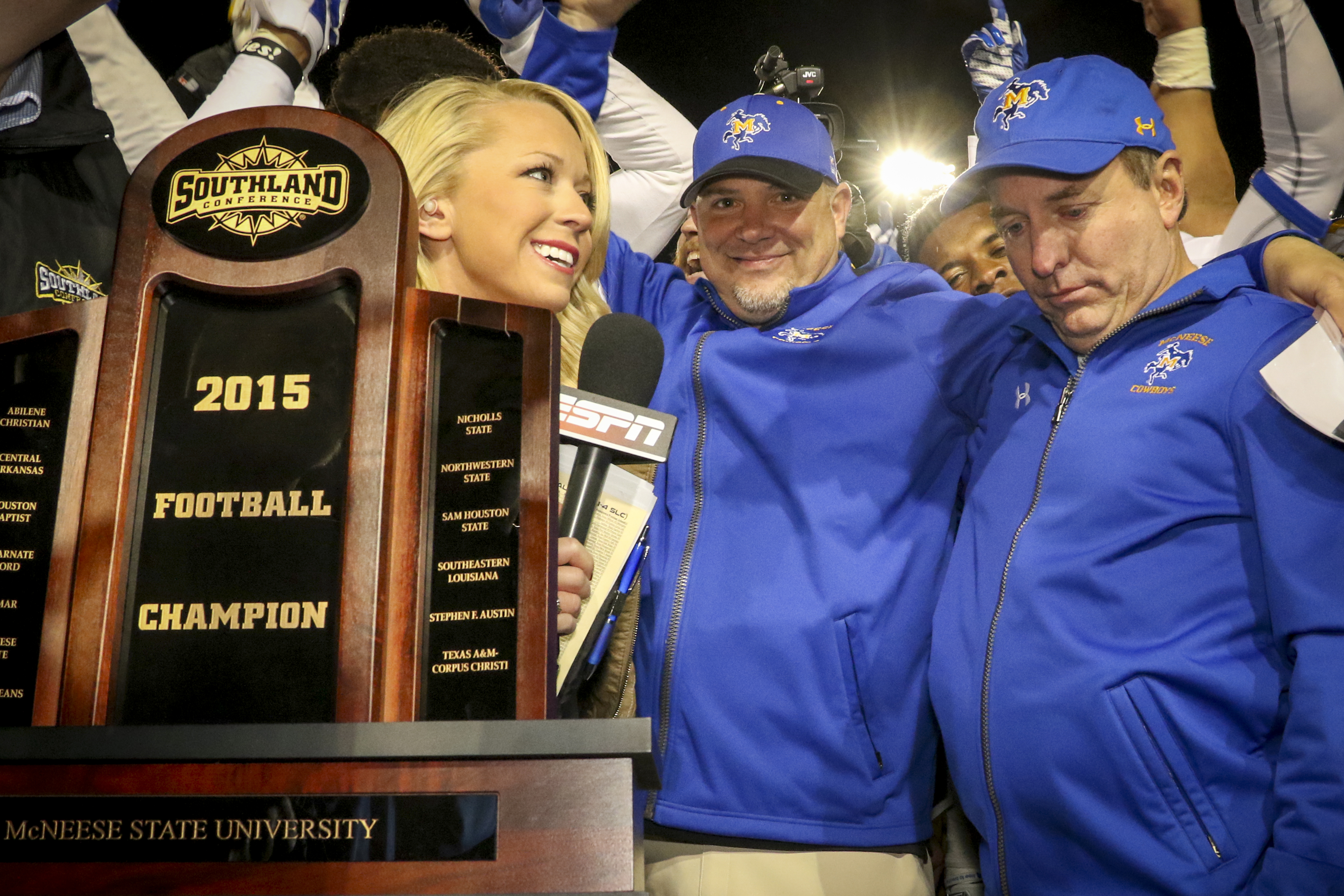
Lance Guidry – 2015 SLC Champs

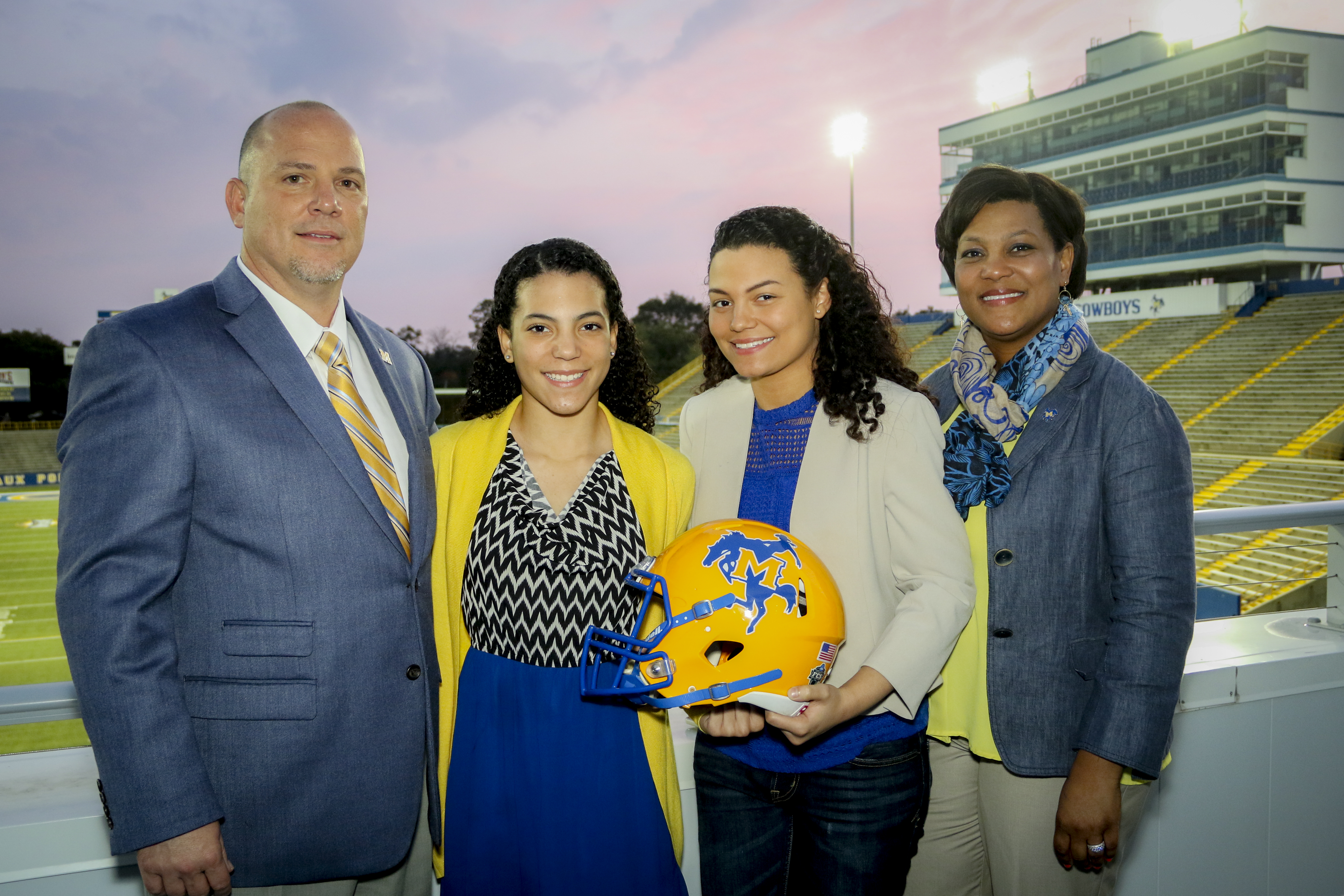
Lance Guidry & Family

== Head coaching record ==
=== College ===
Year	Team	Overall	Conference	Standing	Bowl/playoffs	STATS^{#}	Coaches^{°}
Miami RedHawks (Mid-American Conference) (2010)
2010	Miami (OH)	1–0 (Note: Michael Haywood coached Miami during the regular season and the 2010 MAC Championship Game, leading the RedHawks to a 9–4 overall record and a first-place finish in the MAC East with a 7–1 mark.)	0–0	(East)	W GoDaddy.com		
Miami:		1–0	0–0				
Western Kentucky (Sun Belt Conference) (2012)
2012	Western Kentucky	0–1 (Note: Willie Taggart coached Western Kentucky during the regular season, leading the Hilltoppers to a 7–5 overall record and a fifth-place finish in conference play with a 4–4 mark.)	0–0		L Little Caesars Pizza		
Western Kentucky:		0–1	0–0				
McNeese State Cowboys (Southland Conference) (2016–2018)
2016	McNeese State	6–5	5–4	T–4th			
2017	McNeese State	9–2	7–2	T–3rd		22	18
2018	McNeese State	6–5	5–4	T–4th			
McNeese State:		21–12	17–10				
Total:		22–13					
