= 2017 Incarnate Word Cardinals football team =

American college football season

2017 Incarnate Word Cardinals football
- Conference: Southland Conference
- Record: 1–10 (1–7 Southland)
- Head coach: Larry Kennan (6th season)
- Offensive coordinator: Kyle Kennan (1st season)
- Offensive scheme: Multiple
- Defensive coordinator: Brian Gamble (6th season)
- Base defense: 3–4
- Home stadium: Gayle and Tom Benson Stadium

2017 Southland Conference football standings
	Conf.			Overall
Team	W		L	W		L
No. 10 Central Arkansas $^	9	–	0	10	–	2
No. 4 Sam Houston State ^	8	–	1	12	–	2
No. 25 Nicholls State ^	7	–	2	8	–	4
No. 22 McNeese State	7	–	2	9	–	2
Southeastern Louisiana	6	–	3	6	–	5
Northwestern State	4	–	5	4	–	7
Stephen F. Austin	4	–	5	4	–	7
Abilene Christian	2	–	7	2	–	9
Incarnate Word	1	–	7	1	–	10
Lamar	1	–	8	2	–	9
Houston Baptist	0	–	9	1	–	10
$ – Conference champion; ^ – FCS playoff participant; Rankings from STATS poll

The 2017 Incarnate Word Cardinals football team represented the University of the Incarnate Word in the 2017 NCAA Division I FCS football season. The Cardinals were in their first full season of FCS and Southland Conference eligibility, as they had completed their four-year transition to Division I from Division II. They were led by sixth-year head coach Larry Kennan. They played their home games at Gayle and Tom Benson Stadium. They finished the season 1–10, 1–7 in Southland play to finish in ninth place.

On November 28, head coach Larry Kennan was fired. He finished at Incarnate Word with a six-year record of 20–46.

== Schedule ==
Date	Time	Opponent	Site	TV	Result	Attendance
September 2	9:00 p.m.	at Fresno State*	Bulldog Stadium; Fresno, CA		L 0–66	39,447
September 9	8:00 p.m.	at Sacramento State*	Hornet Stadium; Sacramento, CA	Pluto TV	L 22–56	7,806
September 16	6:00 p.m.	at Stephen F. Austin	Homer Bryce Stadium; Nacogdoches, TX	ESPN3	L 31–37	11,401
September 30	6:00 p.m.	Abilene Christian	Gayle and Tom Benson Stadium; San Antonio, TX	KCWX	L 20–45	5,323
October 7	10:00 a.m. (Note: Game was originally scheduled for 4:00 p.m. CST, but was moved up due to the threat of inclement weather.)	at Southeastern Louisiana	Strawberry Stadium; Hammond, LA	LionVision	L 30–49	4,156
October 14	6:00 p.m.	Lamar	Gayle and Tom Benson Stadium; San Antonio, TX	UIWtv	W 33–24	5,001
October 21	6:00 p.m.	at No. 20 McNeese State	Cowboy Stadium; Lake Charles, LA	AACI	L 7–55	9,732
October 28	2:00 p.m.	Nicholls State^{†}	Gayle and Tom Benson Stadium; San Antonio, TX	UIWtv	L 31–38	4,999
November 4	1:00 p.m.	at No. 5 Sam Houston State	Bowers Stadium; Huntsville, TX	ESPN3	L 20–57	5,077
November 11	6:00 p.m.	No. 3 Central Arkansas	Gayle and Tom Benson Stadium; San Antonio, TX	UIWtv	L 10–56	4,652
November 16	6:00 p.m.	Prairie View A&M*	Gayle and Tom Benson Stadium; San Antonio, TX	Eleven Sports	L 28–42	4,430
*Non-conference game; ^{†}Homecoming; Rankings from STATS FCS Poll released prior to game Poll released prior to the game; All times are in Central time

== Personnel ==
=== Coaching staff ===
Name	Position	Alma mater	Joined staff
Larry Kennan	Head coach	La Verne (1966)	2012
Larry Moore	Associate head coach for offense / Offensive Line	BYU (1996)	2011
Robert Lyles	Associate head coach for defense / Outside Linebackers	TCU (1984)	2015
Kyle Kennan	Offensive coordinator / wide receivers	Roger Williams (2001)	2008
Brian Gamble	Defensive coordinator / Inside Linebackers	Texas A&M (2002)	2008
Sean Davis	Pass game coordinator / quarterbacks	Azusa Pacific (2006)	2013
Nick Debose	Defensive backs	Southeastern Oklahoma (2006)	2008
Mike Barela	Run game coordinator / tight ends	North Texas (1996)	2015
Jim Partee	Running backs	Occidental College (2016)	2016
Polo Gutierrez	Special teams coordinator / Defensive Line	New Mexico State (2009)	2017
Miguel Rodriguez	Defensive Graduate Assistant	UTSA (2014)	2017
Patrick Banigan	Defensive Quality Control	Texas A&M (2015)	2017
Robert Churchman	Director of football operations	Sul Ross (2013)	2016
Darin Lovat	Strength and Conditioning Coach	UNLV (1997)	2012
T.R. St. Charles	Head Football Athletic Trainer	Vanderbilt (1976)	2008

=== Roster ===
2017 Incarnate Word Cardinals football
Quarterback: 3 Sean Brophy – junior (6'2, 210); 10 Chandler Herman – freshman (6'1, 200); 15 Taylor Laird – (redshirt) senior (6'4, 225); 18 Taylor Brown – junior (6'1, 220); 19 Blake Lowry – freshman (6'0, 180); Running back: 1 Desmond Hite – sophomore (5'9, 178); 4 Ra'Quanne Dickens – junior (5'10, 185); 6 Derrick Mitchell – senior (6'1, 190); 7 Dorland Fields – (redshirt) junior (5'9, 195); 20 Keshon Leonard – (redshirt) junior (5'7, 170); 29 Keyondrick Philio – freshman (6'0, 180); 30 Scotland Butler – senior (5'10, 205); 48 Jaime Gonzalez – freshman (5'9, 195); Wide receiver: 2 Cam Johnson – (redshirt) freshman (6'0, 178); 5 Breylann McCollum – (redshirt) senior (6'1, 207); 6 Lamont Johnson – junior (6'0, 170); 11 Zaire Andre – junior (6'0, 175); 16 Daryl Brooks – (redshirt) senior (6'4, 205); 21 Phillip Baptiste – junior (6'0, 200); 22 Jamari Gilbert – (redshirt) senior (6'2, 200); 81 Kody Edwards – senior (6'0, 165); 82 Kolby Anthony – sophomore (5'10, 180); 85 Anthony Marciano – (redshirt) junior (6'0, 185); 86 Kade Creek – freshman (5'10, 165); 87 Michael Sandoval – freshman (6'1, 200); 88 Ethan Gonzalez – junior (5'11, 177); Tight end: 44 Jeriel Cervantes – freshman (6'5, 235); 45 Marcus Valverde – freshman (6'3, 220); 80 Jezel Parra – junior (6'3, 235); 83 Travis Quillin – sophomore (6'2, 220); 84 Malik Harris – junior (6'5, 255); 89 John Myers – (redshirt) sophomore (6'6, 250)	H–Back: 46 Phillip Higgins – (redshirt) sophomore (6'0, 260); Offensive line: 57 Devyn Jensen – OG – senior (6'3, 285); 61 Draven Taylor – OT – (redshirt) senior (6'2, 292); 63 Tyler Preston – C – (redshirt) junior (6'3, 300); 64 Roberto Limon – OG – (redshirt) junior (6'3, 315); 66 Levi Swang – OL – (redshirt) freshman (6'5, 280); 68 Roland Caldera – OL – freshman (6'2, 260); 70 Ryan Carlson – OT – (redshirt) freshman (6'7, 260); 72 Brandon Floores – C – sophomore (6'4, 280); 73 German Valenzuela – OL – junior (6'1, 295); 75 Jeremy Jones – OG – (redshirt) sophomore (6'5, 287); 76 Austin Jennings – OG – (redshirt) senior (6'4, 295); 77 Terence Hickman II – OT – sophomore (6'3, 260); 78 Uzoma Okere – OL – (redshirt) freshman (6'2, 260); 79 Mark Palacios Jr. – OL – (redshirt) freshman (6'2, 290); Defensive line: 2 Justin Alexandre – DE – junior (6'5, 260); 50 Zak Kepner – DE – freshman (6'5, 260); 54 Corey Lee – DE – (redshirt) senior (6'0, 280); 55 Darius Montgomery – DE – (redshirt) junior (6'2, 260); 90 Matthew Yarbrough – DE – sophomore (6'0, 279); 94 Cameron Wilson – NT – (redshirt) sophomore (6'5, 300); 95 Jordan Collins – NT – (redshirt) senior (5'10, 299); 96 John Williams – NT – junior (6'3, 290); 97 Tyler Colbert – NT – (redshirt) senior (6'2, 295); 98 Jawara Beasley – DE – senior (6'3, 247); 99 Javon Wright – DE – freshman (6'5, 200); Kicker / Punter: 36 Joseph Zema – P – Graduate Senior (6'3, 195); 37 Jose Perez – K – freshman (6'1, 170); 39 James Liker – K – senior (6'1, 200); 41 Cody Seidel – K/P – junior (6'2, 210); 58 Parker Grothaus – K – freshman (6'2, 200); 59 Cade Kostroun – P – freshman (6'3, 175)	Linebacker: 3 Greg Lemon – OLB – (redshirt) senior (6'2, 245); 8 Quandre Washington – ILB – senior (6'1, 226); 9 Mar’kel Cooks – ILB – sophomore (6'0, 215); 12 Silas Stewart – OLB – junior (6'3, 220); 17 Karee Berry – OLB – senior (6'3, 225); 32 Jaecorien Barnes – ILB – freshman (6'0, 215); 35 Dax Eisinger – ILB – junior (6'2, 230); 42 Israel Acuay – OLB – (redshirt) junior (6'2, 238); 43 West Lambert – ILB – (redshirt) sophomore (6'0, 230); 47 Leighton Dimando – LB – freshman (6'0, 210); 49 Kolton Lindemann – ILB – freshman (6'2, 230); 56 Andy Jennings – OLB – junior (6'2, 220); 92 Blake Klumpp – OLB – (redshirt) junior (6'3, 235); Defensive back: 10 Devin Bracy – CB – junior (5'11, 188); 11 Marquis Lawson – CB – sophomore (5'9, 165); 13 Jeilyn Williams – CB – senior (5'9, 170); 14 Jared Ambers – CB – senior (6'1, 170); 17 Sean Hoeferkamp – S – senior (6'1, 205); 18 Cam Knight – CB – junior (5'10, 190); 23 Kyle Covington – CB – sophomore (6'2, 180); 24 Chris Thomas – S – sophomore (6'2, 185); 25 Jamarkese Williams – CB – (redshirt) junior (6'3, 190); 26 Marquis Britten – CB – freshman (5'11, 165); 27 Jawun Jiles – S – junior (5'10, 193); 28 Adam Garza – CB – sophomore (5'10, 170); 31 Randalle Williams-Diaz – CB – junior (6'0, 175); 33 Shaquirius Miller – CB – (redshirt) freshman (5'10, 185); 34 Cedric Lee – freshman (5'9, 180); 38 Tim McCoy – S – (redshirt) junior (5'10, 190); Long snapper: 40 Blake Biby – freshman (5'9, 190); 60 Matthew Swanson – sophomore (6'0, 225)

== Depth chart ==
Defense

FS
23 Kyle Covington, So
38 Tim McCoy, Jr
⋅

WLB	ILB	ILB	SLB
42 Israel Acuay, Jr	9 Mar'kel Cooks, So	8 Quandre Washington, Sr	92 Blake Klumpp, Jr
17 Karee Berry, Jr	35 Dax Eisinger, Jr	43 West Lambert, So	3 Greg Lemon, Sr
56 Andy Jennings, Jr	47 Leighton Dimando, Fr	⋅	12 Silas Stewart, Jr

SS
27 Jawun Jiles, Jr
33 Shaquirius Miller, R-Fr
24 Chris Thomas, So

CB
13 Jeilyn Williams, Sr
10 Devin Bracy, Jr
26 Marquis Britten, Fr

DE	NT	DE
54 Corey Lee, Sr	96 John Williams, Jr	55 Darrius Montgomery, Jr
2 Justin Alexandre, Jr	97 Tyler Colbert, Sr	94 Cameron Wilson, So
⋅	95 Jordan Collins, Sr	⋅

CB
25 Jamarkese Williams, Jr
18 Cam Knight, Jr
14 Jared Ambres, Sr

Offense

WR
22 Jamari Gilbert, Sr
11 Zaire Andre, Jr
2 Cam Johnson, R-Fr

LT	LG	C	RG	RT
77 Terence Hickman II, So	73 German Valenzuela, Jr	63 Tyler Preston, Jr	61 Draven Taylor, Sr	75 Jeremy Jones, So
70 Ryan Carlson, R-Fr	57 Devyn Jensen, Sr	66 Levi Swang, R-Fr	72 Brandon Floores, So	76 Austin Jennings, Sr
79 Mark Palacios, R-Fr	78 Uzoma Okere, R-Fr	⋅	64 Roberto Limon, Jr	⋅

TE
89 John Meyers, So
84 Malik Harris, Jr
45 Marcus Valverde, Fr

WR
21 Phillip Baptiste, Jr
16 Daryl Brooks, Sr
5 Breylann McCollum, Sr

QB
15 Taylor Laird, Sr
3 Sean Brophy, Jr
10 Chandler Herman, Fr

RB
6 Derrick Mitchell, Sr
4 Ra'Quanne Dickens, Jr
1 Desmond Hite, So

FB
80 Jezel Parra, Jr
46 Phillip Higgins, So
⋅

Special teams
PK 37 Jose Perez, So
PK 39 James Liker, Sr
P 36 Joseph Zema, Gr
P 41 Cody Seidel, Jr
KR 1 Desmond Hite, So
PR 11 Zaire Andre, Jr
LS 92 Blake Klumpp, Jr
H 85 Anthony Marciano, Jr

== Postseason honors ==
The following Cardinals received postseason honors for the 2017 season:

Associated Press FCS All–America First–Team
P Joe Zema – Senior

STATS FCS All–America First–Team
P Joe Zema – Senior

STATS FCS All–America Second–Team
KR Desmond Hite – Sophomore

AFCA FCS Coaches' All–America Second–Team
P Joe Zema – Senior

HERO Sports FCS All–America First–Team
P Joe Zema – Senior

HERO Sports FCS All–America Second–Team
KR Desmond Hite – Sophomore

All–Southland Conference First–Team
P Joe Zema – Senior
KR Desmond Hite – Sophomore

All–Southland Conference Second–Team
AP Desmond Hite – Sophomore

All–Southland Conference Honorable Mention
RB Derrick Mitchell – Senior
OL Terence Hickman II – Sophomore
LB Mar'Kel Cooks – Sophomore

Athletic Directors Association (ADA) FCS Top Collegiate Punter
P Joe Zema – Senior

== Game summaries ==
=== @ Fresno State ===
Incarnate Word at Fresno State

Team	1	2	3	4	Total
Cardinals	0	0	0	0	0
• Bulldogs	17	17	32	0	66

- Date: September 2
- Location: Bulldog Stadium
  Fresno, CA
- Game start: 9:00 p.m. CST
- Elapsed time: 3:01
- Game attendance: 39,447
- Game weather: 102°F • NW 6 • Fair
- Referee: Mike Cuttone
Sources: Box Score

Scoring summary
1	6:51	Fresno State	Josh Hokit 1 yard run (Jimmy Camacho kick), Drive: 6 plays, 43 yards, 2:32	0–7
1	3:56	Fresno State	Jimmy Camacho 30 yard field goal, Drive: 4 plays, 4 yards, 1:15	0–10
1	1:51	Fresno State	Jared Rice 65 yard pass from Josh Hokit (Jimmy Camacho kick), Drive: 4 plays, 84 yards, 0:50	0–17
2	11:09	Fresno State	Jimmy Camacho 47 yard field goal, Drive: 7 plays, 42 yards, 1:49	0–20
2	4:53	Fresno State	Josh Hokit 4 yard run (Jimmy Camacho kick), Drive: 5 plays, 84 yards, 1:48	0–27
2	0:15	Fresno State	Kyle Riddering 2 yard pass from Chason Virgil (Jimmy Camacho kick), Drive: 10 plays, 74 yards, 3:15	0–34
3	13:11	Fresno State	Team 0 yard safety	0–36
3	11:57	Fresno State	Ronnie Rivers 30 yard run (Jimmy Camacho kick), Drive: 4 plays, 61 yards, 1:14	0–43
3	10:22	Fresno State	Emeka Ndoh 10 yard safety	0–45
3	7:48	Fresno State	Jamire Jordan 24 yard pass from Marcus McMaryion (Jimmy Camacho kick), Drive: 5 plays, 58 yards, 2:25	0–52
3	5:40	Fresno State	Jordan Mims 13 yard run (Jimmy Camacho kick), Drive: 4 plays, 24 yards, 1:51	0–59
3	0:33	Fresno State	Justin Allen 45 yard pass from Marcus McMaryion (Jimmy Camacho kick), Drive: 6 plays, 64 yards, 3:27	0–66

=== @ Sacramento State ===
Incarnate Word at Sacramento State

Team	1	2	3	4	Total
Cardinals	0	3	5	14	22
• Hornets	7	21	28	0	56

- Date: September 9
- Location: Hornet Stadium
  Sacramento, CA
- Game start: 8:00 p.m. CST
- Elapsed time: 3:20
- Game attendance: 7,806
- Game weather: 93°F • 6 mph • Clear
- Referee: Scott Root
- Television network: Pluto TV
Sources: Box Score

Scoring summary
1	11:02	Sacramento State	Isiah Hennie 44 yard pass from Kevin Thomson (Devon Medeiros kick), Drive: 1 play, 44 yards, 0:11	0–7
2	12:12	Sacramento State	Elijah Dotson 51 yard run (Devon Medeiros kick), Drive: 4 plays, 75 yards, 1:20	0–14
2	9:51	Sacramento State	Johnnie Rucker 7 yard pass from Kevin Thomson (Devon Medeiros kick), Drive: 3 plays, 11 yards, 1:26	0–21
2	3:33	Incarnate Word	Jose Perez 19 yard field goal, Drive: 4 plays, 8 yards, 2:01	3–21
2	2:25	Sacramento State	Joseph Ajeigbe 2 yard run (Devon Medeiros kick), Drive: 3 plays, 51 yards, 0:59	3–28
3	12:50	Sacramento State	Elijah Dotson 32 yard pass from Kevin Thomson (Devon Medeiros kick), Drive: 4 plays, 65 yards, 1:12	3–35
3	10:41	Incarnate Word	Jose Perez 40 yard field goal, Drive: 6 plays, 52 yards, 2:09	6–35
3	10:41	Incarnate Word	Team 1 yard safety	8–35
3	7:35	Sacramento State	Jaelin Ratliff 48 yard pass from Kevin Thomson (Devon Medeiros kick), Drive: 6 plays, 68 yards, 2:17	8–42
3	4:38	Sacramento State	Andre Lindsey 60 yard pass from Kevin Thomson (Devon Medeiros kick), Drive: 3 plays, 62 yards, 0:47	8–49
3	0:13	Sacramento State	Wyatt Clapper 13 yard run (Devon Medeiros kick), Drive: 8 plays, 75 yards, 3:01	8–56
4	7:08	Incarnate Word	Malik Harris 2 yard pass from Sean Brophy (Jose Perez kick), Drive: 4 plays, 46 yards, 1:45	15–56
4	5:01	Incarnate Word	Derrick Mitchell 8 yard run (Jose Perez kick), Drive: 2 plays, 12 yards, 0:43	22–56

=== @ Stephen F. Austin ===
Incarnate Word at Stephen F. Austin

Team	1	2	3	4	Total
Cardinals	0	10	14	7	31
• Lumberjacks	21	0	0	16	37

- Date: September 16
- Location: Homer Bryce Stadium
  Nacogdoches, TX
- Game start: 6:00 p.m. CST
- Elapsed time: 3:35
- Game attendance: 11,401
- Game weather: 87°F • SE 4 mph • Sunny
- Referee: Vidal Jones
- Television network: ESPN3
Sources: Box Score

Scoring summary
1	13:16	Stephen F. Austin	Kijana Amous 3 yard run (Storm Ruiz kick), Drive: 6 plays, 46 yards, 1:44	0–7
1	9:45	Stephen F. Austin	Foster Sawyer 19 yard run (Storm Ruiz kick), Drive: 5 plays, 70 yards, 1:25	0–14
1	2:45	Stephen F. Austin	Terian Goree 28 yard pass from Foster Sawyer (Storm Ruiz kick), Drive: 8 plays, 69 yards, 2:14	0–21
2	10:07	Incarnate Word	Marcus Valverde 4 yard pass from Sean Brophy (Jose Perez kick), Drive: 17 plays, 82 yards, 7:33	7–21
2	0:06	Incarnate Word	Jose Perez 40 yard field goal, Drive: 9 plays, 64 yards, 2:17	10–21
3	8:50	Incarnate Word	Malik Harris 12 yard pass from Sean Brophy (Jose Perez kick), Drive: 8 plays, 59 yards, 3:37	17–21
3	3:08	Incarnate Word	Zaire Andre 16 yard pass from Sean Brophy (Jose Perez kick), Drive: 9 plays, 70 yards, 3:27	24–21
4	11:58	Incarnate Word	Malik Harris 25 yard pass from Sean Brophy (Jose Perez kick), Drive: 8 plays, 69 yards, 4:03	31–21
4	8:24	Stephen F. Austin	Storm Ruiz 37 yard field goal, Drive: 10 plays, 29 yards, 3:26	31–24
4	5:24	Stephen F. Austin	Tamrick Pace 24 yard pass from Foster Sawyer (Storm Ruiz kick), Drive: 4 plays, 73 yards, 0:51	31–31
4	0:00	Stephen F. Austin	Alize Ward 70 yard interception return	31–37

=== Abilene Christian ===
Abilene Christian at Incarnate Word

Team	1	2	3	4	Total
• Wildcats	7	28	3	7	45
Cardinals	6	0	7	7	20

- Date: September 30
- Location: Gayle and Tom Benson Stadium
  San Antonio, TX
- Game start: 6:00 p.m. CST
- Elapsed time: 3:27
- Game attendance: 5,323
- Game weather: 77°F • ENE 7 mph • Mostly Sunny
- Referee: Ross Smith
- Television network: KCWX/ESPN3
Sources: Box Score

Scoring summary
1	6:51	Abilene Christian	Dallas Sealey 2 yard run (Nik Grau kick), Drive: 8 plays, 65 yards, 2:54	0–7
1	0:09	Incarnate Word	Derrick Mitchell 6 yard pass from Sean Brophy (Jose Perez kick failed), Drive: 7 plays, 59 yards, 3:08	6–7
2	14:36	Abilene Christian	Dallas Sealey 1 yard run (Nik Grau kick), Drive: 3 plays, 61 yards, 0:25	6–14
2	9:26	Abilene Christian	Dallas Sealey 13 yard run (Nik Grau kick), Drive: 8 plays, 68 yards, 3:31	6–21
2	7:46	Abilene Christian	Troy Grant 16 yard pass from Dallas Sealey (Nik Grau kick), Drive: 2 plays, 19 yards, 0:38	6–28
2	4:52	Abilene Christian	Tracy James 6 yard run (Nik Grau kick), Drive: 3 plays, 25 yards, 1:17	6–35
3	10:29	Abilene Christian	Nik Grau 28 yard field goal, Drive: 10 plays, 64 yards, 4:31	6–38
3	6:53	Incarnate Word	Jezel Parra 10 yard pass from Sean Brophy (Jose Perez kick), Drive: 1 play, 10 yards, 0:05	13–38
4	11:32	Abilene Christian	Justin Miller 34 yard pass from Luke Anthony (Nick Grau kick), Drive: 4 plays, 43 yards, 2:25	13–45
4	8:20	Incarnate Word	Ra'Quanne Dickens 7 yard run (Jose Perez kick), Drive: 6 plays, 75 yards, 3:04	20–45

=== @ Southeastern Louisiana ===
Incarnate Word at Southeastern Louisiana

Team	1	2	3	4	Total
Cardinals	3	17	3	7	30
• Lions	7	21	0	21	49

- Date: October 7
- Location: Strawberry Stadium
  Hammond, LA
- Game start: 10:00 a.m. CST
- Elapsed time: 3:14
- Game attendance: 4,156
- Game weather: 75°F • ENE 6 mph • Cloudy
- Referee: Steve Baron
Sources: Box Score

Scoring summary
1	4:55	Incarnate Word	Jose Perez 43 yard field goal, Drive: 9 plays, 23 yards, 4:19	3–0
1	4:41	Southeastern Louisiana	Juwan Petit-Frere 99 yard kickoff return (Dillon Burkhard kick)	3–7
2	10:41	Incarnate Word	Jose Perez 42 yard field goal, Drive: 4 plays, 4 yards, 1:25	6–7
2	7:19	Southeastern Louisiana	Darren Johnson 31 yard run (Dillon Burkhard kick), Drive: 5 plays, 53 yards, 1:35	6–14
2	7:01	Incarnate Word	Desmond Hite 100 yard kickoff return (Jose Perez kick)	13–14
2	5:08	Southeastern Louisiana	Austin Mitchell 26 yard pass from Lorenzo Nunez (Dillon Burkhard kick), Drive: 4 plays, 72 yards, 1:45	13–21
2	1:03	Incarnate Word	Phillip Baptiste 44 yard pass from Sean Brophy (Jose Perez kick), Drive: 9 plays, 75 yards, 4:05	20–21
2	0:49	Southeastern Louisiana	Austin Mitchell 70 yard pass from Lorenzo Nunez (Dillon Burkhard kick), Drive: 2 plays, 75 yards, 0:14	20–28
3	10:30	Incarnate Word	Jose Perez 48 yard field goal, Drive: 10 plays, 26 yards, 4:21	23–28
4	9:30	Southeastern Louisiana	Austin Mitchell 34 yard pass from Lorenzo Nunez (Dillon Burkhard kick), Drive: 3 plays, 95 yards, 0:57	23–35
4	6:50	Southeastern Louisiana	Bransen Schwebel 5 yard pass from Byron Walker (Dillon Burkhard kick), Drive: 4 plays, 73 yards, 1:33	23–42
4	4:10	Incarnate Word	Derrick Mitchell 1 yard run (Jose Perez kick), Drive: 7 plays, 77 yards, 2:38	30–42
4	3:42	Southeastern Louisiana	Juwan Petit-Frere 34 yard pass from Byron Walker (Dillon Burkhard kick), Drive: 2 plays, 47 yards, 0:27	30–49

=== Lamar ===
Lamar at Incarnate Word

Team	1	2	3	4	Total
Cardinals (LU)	0	10	14	0	24
• Cardinals (UIW)	14	6	7	6	33

- Date: October 14
- Location: Gayle and Tom Benson Stadium
  San Antonio, TX
- Game start: 6:00 p.m. CST
- Elapsed time: 3:04
- Game attendance: 5,001
- Game weather: 90°F • N 8 mph • Partly Cloudy, Hot
- Referee: Steve Baron
Sources: Box Score

Scoring summary
1	12:44	Incarnate Word	Derrick Mitchell 5 yard run (Jose Perez kick), Drive: 5 plays, 67 yards, 2:16	7–0
1	8:13	Incarnate Word	Ra'Quanne Dickens 7 yard run (Jose Perez kick), Drive: 6 plays, 80 yards, 2:26	14–0
2	9:29	Lamar	Elvin Martinez 34 yard field goal, Drive: 4 plays, -1 yard, 0:55	14–3
2	1:47	Lamar	Darrel Colbert Jr. 5 yard run (Elvin Martinez kick), Drive: 5 plays, 31 yards, 2:23	14–10
2	0:46	Incarnate Word	Derrick Mitchell 74 yard run (Jose Perez kick failed), Drive: 2 plays, 75 yards, 1:01	20–10
3	11:02	Lamar	Kendrick King 3 yard run (Elvin Martinez kick), Drive: 11 plays, 75 yards, 3:58	20–17
3	5:17	Incarnate Word	Zaire Andre 5 yard pass from Sean Brophy (Jose Perez kick), Drive: 12 plays, 79 yards, 5:37	27–17
3	3:20	Lamar	Andrew Allen 1 yard run (Elvin Martinez kick), Drive: 5 plays, 75 yards, 1:57	27–24
4	0:50	Incarnate Word	Sean Brophy 1 yard run (Jose Perez kick blocked), Drive: 4 plays, 25 yards, 1:13	33–24

=== @ McNeese State ===
Incarnate Word at McNeese State

Team	1	2	3	4	Total
Cardinals	7	0	0	0	7
• #20 Cowboys	17	7	21	10	55

- Date: October 21
- Location: Cowboy Stadium
  Lake Charles, LA
- Game start: 6:00 p.m. CST
- Elapsed time: 3:10
- Game attendance: 9,732
- Game weather: 82°F • SSE 12 • Partly Cloudy
- Referee: Dan Lewis
Sources: Box Score

Scoring summary
1	14:48	Incarnate Word	Desmond Hite 96 yard kickoff return (Jose Perez kick)	7–0
1	4:50	McNeese State	Gunnar Raborn 35 yard field goal, Drive: 13 plays, 62 yards, 5:06	7–3
1	4:28	McNeese State	Calum Foster 42 yard interception return (Gunnar Raborn kick)	7–10
1	2:40	McNeese State	Colby Burton 51 yard interception return (Gunnar Raborn kick)	7–17
2	8:44	McNeese State	James Tabary 1 yard run (Gunnar Raborn kick), Drive: 7 plays, 80 yards, 2:39	7–24
3	13:44	McNeese State	David Hamm 54 yard run (Gunnar Raborn kick), Drive: 3 plays, 65 yards, 1:16	7–31
3	9:49	McNeese State	Justin Pratt 7 yard pass from James Tabary (Gunnar Raborn kick), Drive: 4 plays, 65 yards, 1:41	7–38
3	8:45	McNeese State	Dominique Hill 38 yard interception return (Gunnar Raborn kick)	7–45
4	8:43	McNeese State	Gunnar Raborn 30 yard field goal, Drive: 10 plays, 46 yards, 5:10	7–48
4	7:01	McNeese State	Marcus Foster 29 yard interception return (Gunnar Raborn kick)	7–55

=== Nicholls State ===
Nicholls State at Incarnate Word

Team	1	2	3	4	Total
• Colonels	14	17	7	0	38
Cardinals	0	14	7	10	31

- Date: October 28
- Location: Gayle and Tom Benson Stadium
  San Antonio, TX
- Game start: 2:00 p.m. CST
- Elapsed time: 3:09
- Game attendance: 4,999
- Game weather: 61°F • N 9 • Sunny
- Referee: C. Watson
- Television network: UIWtv
Sources: Box Score

Scoring summary
1	13:21	Nicholls State	Mason Roberts 68 yard pass from Chase Fourcade (Lorran Fonseca kick), Drive: 2 plays, 71 yards, 0:42	0–7
1	1:53	Nicholls State	Kyran Irvin 4 yard run (Lorran Fonseca kick), Drive: 8 plays, 80 yards, 2:27	0–14
2	11:20	Incarnate Word	Phillip Baptiste 20 yard pass from Sean Brophy (Jose Perez kick), Drive: 12 plays, 81 yards, 5:27	7–14
2	6:06	Nicholls State	Lorran Fonseca 33 yard field goal, Drive: 12 plays, 64 yards, 5:07	7–17
2	5:51	Incarnate Word	Desmond Hite 100 yard kickoff return (Jose Perez kick)	14–17
2	2:23	Nicholls State	Dai'Jean Dixon 8 yard pass from Chase Fourcade (Lorran Fonseca kick), Drive: 1 play, 8 yards, 0:01	14–24
2	1:03	Nicholls State	Laryon James 57 yard interception return (Lorran Fonseca kick)	14–31
3	9:57	Incarnate Word	Ra'Quanne Dickens 1 yard run (Jose Perez kick), Drive: 6 plays, 90 yards, 2:56	21–31
3	3:31	Nicholls State	Dai'Jean Dixon 55 yard pass from Chase Fourcade (Lorran Fonseca kick), Drive: 6 plays, 80 yards, 2:56	21–38
4	13:15	Incarnate Word	Jose Perez 45 yard field goal, Drive: 4 plays, 2 yards, 1:33	24–38
4	0:45	Incarnate Word	Zaire Andre 2 yard pass from Sean Brophy (Jose Perez kick), Drive: 5 plays, 49 yards, 1:05	31–38

=== @ Sam Houston State ===
Incarnate Word at Sam Houston State

Team	1	2	3	4	Total
Cardinals	7	7	0	6	20
• #5 Bearkats	23	13	21	0	57

- Date: November 4
- Location: Bowers Stadium
  Huntsville, TX
- Game start: 1:00 p.m. CST
- Elapsed time: 3:24
- Game attendance: 5,077
- Game weather: 82°F • S 8 • Sunny and humid
- Referee: Ross Smith
- Television network: ESPN3
Sources: Box Score

Scoring summary
1	14:07	Sam Houston State	Corey Avery 6 yard run (Tre Honshtein kick), Drive: 4 plays, 87 yards, 0:53	0–7
1	11:59	Sam Houston State	Team 16 yard safety	0–9
1	10:55	Sam Houston State	Corey Avery 1 yard run (Tre Honshtein kick), Drive: 5 plays, 64 yards, 0:58	0–16
1	2:03	Sam Houston State	Yedidiah Louis 1 yard pass from Jeremiah Briscoe (Tre Honshtein kick), Drive: 12 plays, 45 yards, 3:43	0–23
1	1:13	Incarnate Word	Zaire Andre 54 yard pass from Taylor Laird (Jose Perez kick), Drive: 3 plays, 74 yards, 0:41	7–23
2	11:05	Sam Houston State	Tre Honshtein 42 yard field goal, Drive: 9 plays, 55 yards, 2:15	7–26
2	8:08	Sam Houston State	Corey Avery 2 yard run (Tre Honshtein kick), Drive: 2 plays, 2 yards, 0:07	7–33
2	2:55	Incarnate Word	Dax Eisinger 0 yard blocked punt return (Jose Perez kick)	14–33
2	0:20	Sam Houston State	Tre Honshtein 39 yard field goal, Drive: 10 plays, 54 yards, 2:35	14–36
3	12:51	Sam Houston State	Davion Davis 69 yard pass from Jeremiah Briscoe (Tre Honshtein kick), Drive: 3 plays, 86 yards, 0:50	14–43
3	10:05	Sam Houston State	Yedidiah Louis 21 yard pass from Jeremiah Briscoe (Tre Honshtein kick), Drive: 6 plays, 64 yards, 1:49	14–50
3	6:10	Sam Houston State	Michael Mueller 12 yard pass from Jeremiah Briscoe (Tre Honshtein kick), Drive: 10 plays, 61 yards, 2:55	14–57
4	5:37	Incarnate Word	Phillip Baptiste 63 yard pass from Taylor Laird (Jose Perez kick failed), Drive: 2 plays, 65 yards, 0:38	20–57

=== Central Arkansas ===
Central Arkansas at Incarnate Word

Team	1	2	3	4	Total
• #3 Bears	14	28	0	14	56
Cardinals	3	0	0	7	10

- Date: November 11
- Location: Gayle and Tom Benson Stadium
  San Antonio, TX
- Game start: 6:00 p.m. CST
- Elapsed time: 2:50
- Game attendance: 4,652
- Game weather: 67°F • E 7 • Cloudy, showers
- Referee: Ray Edwards
- Television network: UIWtv
Sources: Box Score

Scoring summary
1	14:50	Central Arkansas	Juan Jackson 43 yard interception return (Matt Cummins kick)	0–7
1	10:24	Incarnate Word	Jose Perez 49 yard field goal, Drive: 10 plays, 46 yards, 4:18	3–7
1	7:43	Central Arkansas	Roman Gordon 9 yard pass from Hayden Hildebrand (Matt Cummins kick), Drive: 8 plays, 43 yards, 2:41	3–14
2	14:22	Central Arkansas	Brandon Cox 69 yard pass from Hayden Hildebrand (Matt Cummins kick), Drive: 2 plays, 75 yards, 0:25	3–21
2	8:18	Central Arkansas	Brandon Cox 9 yard pass from Hayden Hildebrand (Matt Cummins kick), Drive: 8 plays, 59 yards, 2:46	3–28
2	4:59	Central Arkansas	Carlo Blackman 4 yard run (Matt Cummins kick), Drive: 4 plays, 67 yards, 1:00	3–35
2	1:55	Central Arkansas	Kierr Crossley 17 yard run (Matt Cummins kick), Drive: 2 plays, 17 yards, 0:08	3–42
4	13:25	Central Arkansas	Cedric Battle 20 yard run (Matt Cummins kick), Drive: 6 plays, 53 yards, 2:23	3–49
4	10:37	Incarnate Word	Brayden McCollum 49 yard pass from Taylor Laird, Drive: 5 plays, 75 yards, 2:40	10–49
4	4:58	Central Arkansas	Joe Hampton 35 yard pass from Breylin Smith (Matt Cummins kick), Drive: 10 plays, 75 yards, 5:39	10–56

=== Prairie View A&M ===
Prairie View A&M at Incarnate Word

Team	1	2	3	4	Total
• Panthers	14	14	7	7	42
Cardinals	0	14	14	0	28

- Date: November 16
- Location: Gayle and Tom Benson Stadium
  San Antonio, TX
- Game start: 6:00 p.m. CST
- Elapsed time: 3:25
- Game attendance: 4,430
- Game weather: 73°F • SE 4 • Partly cloudy
- Referee: C. Watson
- Television network: Eleven Sports Network
Sources: Box Score

Scoring summary
1	10:40	Prairie View A&M	Darius Floyd 48 yard pass from Neiko Hollins (Zach Elder kick), Drive: 6 plays, 75 yards, 2:05	0–7
1	5:14	Prairie View A&M	Khadarel Hodge 11 yard pass from Neiko Hollins (Zach Elder kick), Drive: 5 plays, 36 yards, 2:17	0–14
2	11:23	Prairie View A&M	Caleb Broach 3 yard run (Zach Elder kick), Drive: 9 plays, 88 yards, 3:04	0–21
2	6:59	Incarnate Word	Daryl Brooks 81 yard pass from Taylor Laird (Jose Perez kick), Drive: 2 plays, 76 yards, 1:17	7–21
2	3:31	Prairie View A&M	Darius Floyd 28 yard pass from Neiko Hollins (Zach Elder kick), Drive: 7 plays, 46 yards, 3:19	7–28
2	1:09	Incarnate Word	Derrick Mitchell 3 yard run (Jose Perez kick), Drive: 4 plays, 41 yards, 1:06	14–28
3	7:42	Incarnate Word	Jezel Parra 16 yard pass from Taylor Laird (Jose Perez kick), Drive: 8 plays, 88 yards, 3:28	21–28
3	0:59	Incarnate Word	Phillip Higgins 4 yard pass from Taylor Laird (Jose Perez kick), Drive: 11 plays, 71 yards, 4:51	28–28
3	0:34	Prairie View A&M	Dawonya Tucker 72 yard run (Zach Elder kick), Drive: 1 play, 72 yards, 0:13	28–35
4	6:37	Prairie View A&M	Khadarel Hodge 49 yard pass from Neiko Hollins (Zach Elder kick), Drive: 4 plays, 64 yards, 1:55	28–42
