= 2017 Abilene Christian Wildcats football team =

American college football season

2017 Abilene Christian Wildcats football
- Conference: Southland Conference
- Record: 2–9 (2–7 Southland)
- Head coach: Adam Dorrel (1st season)
- Offensive coordinator: Josh Lamberson (1st season)
- Offensive scheme: Single set back
- Defensive coordinator: Tremaine Jackson (1st season)
- Base defense: 3–4
- Home stadium: Anthony Field at Wildcat Stadium

2017 Southland Conference football standings
| | Conf. | | | Overall |
| Team | W | | L | W | | L |
|---|---|---|---|---|---|---|
| No. 10 Central Arkansas $^ | 9 | – | 0 | 10 | – | 2 |
| No. 4 Sam Houston State ^ | 8 | – | 1 | 12 | – | 2 |
| No. 25 Nicholls State ^ | 7 | – | 2 | 8 | – | 4 |
| No. 22 McNeese State | 7 | – | 2 | 9 | – | 2 |
| Southeastern Louisiana | 6 | – | 3 | 6 | – | 5 |
| Northwestern State | 4 | – | 5 | 4 | – | 7 |
| Stephen F. Austin | 4 | – | 5 | 4 | – | 7 |
| Abilene Christian | 2 | – | 7 | 2 | – | 9 |
| Incarnate Word | 1 | – | 7 | 1 | – | 10 |
| Lamar | 1 | – | 8 | 2 | – | 9 |
| Houston Baptist | 0 | – | 9 | 1 | – | 10 |
$ – Conference champion; ^ – FCS playoff participant; Rankings from STATS poll

The 2017 Abilene Christian Wildcats football team represented Abilene Christian University in the 2017 NCAA Division I FCS football season. The Wildcats were led by first-year head coach Adam Dorrel and played their home games at Anthony Field at Wildcat Stadium. They played as a member of the Southland Conference. They finished the season 2–9, 2–7 in Southland play to finish in eighth place.

== Schedule ==
| Date | Time | Opponent | Site | TV | Result | Attendance |
|---|---|---|---|---|---|---|
| September 2 | 7:00 p.m. | at New Mexico* | Dreamstyle Stadium; Albuquerque, NM | | L 14–38 | 21,475 |
| September 9 | 2:30 p.m. | at Colorado State* | Colorado State Stadium; Fort Collins, CO | STADIUM | L 10–38 | 27,038 |
| September 16 | 6:00 p.m. | Houston Baptist | Wildcat Stadium; Abilene, TX | ESPN3 | W 24–3 | 12,000 |
| September 23 | 6:00 p.m. | Stephen F. Austin | Wildcat Stadium; Abilene, TX | | L 10–20 | 11,645 |
| September 30 | 6:00 p.m. | at Incarnate Word | Gayle and Tom Benson Stadium; San Antonio, TX | ESPN3 | W 45–20 | 5,323 |
| October 7 | 6:00 p.m. | McNeese State | Wildcat Stadium; Abilene, TX | | L 7–13 | 10,564 |
| October 14 | 3:00 p.m. | at Nicholls State | John L. Guidry Stadium; Thibodaux, LA | | L 20–29 | 7,233 |
| October 21 | 2:30 p.m. | Southeastern Louisiana | Wildcat Stadium; Abilene, TX | | L 21–56 | 12,000 |
| November 4 | 6:00 p.m. | at Northwestern State | Harry Turpin Stadium; Natchitoches, LA | | L 23–26 | 5,042 |
| November 11 | 6:00 p.m. | No. 4 Sam Houston State | Wildcat Stadium; Abilene, TX | ESPN3 | L 35–44 | 5,995 |
| November 18 | 3:00 p.m. | at No. 3 Central Arkansas | Estes Stadium; Conway, AR | ESPN3 | L 0–34 | 4,325 |
*Non-conference game; Rankings from STATS FCS Poll released prior to game Poll released prior to the game; All times are in Central time
