= 2017 McNeese State Cowboys football team =

American college football season

2017 McNeese State Cowboys football
- Conference: Southland Conference

Ranking
- STATS: No. 22
- FCS Coaches: No. 18
- Record: 9–2 (7–2 Southland)
- Head coach: Lance Guidry (2nd season)
- Offensive coordinator: Landon Hoefer (2nd season)
- Defensive coordinator: Tony Restivo (2nd season)
- Home stadium: Cowboy Stadium

2017 Southland Conference football standings
	Conf.			Overall
Team	W		L	W		L
No. 10 Central Arkansas $^	9	–	0	10	–	2
No. 4 Sam Houston State ^	8	–	1	12	–	2
No. 25 Nicholls State ^	7	–	2	8	–	4
No. 22 McNeese State	7	–	2	9	–	2
Southeastern Louisiana	6	–	3	6	–	5
Northwestern State	4	–	5	4	–	7
Stephen F. Austin	4	–	5	4	–	7
Abilene Christian	2	–	7	2	–	9
Incarnate Word	1	–	7	1	–	10
Lamar	1	–	8	2	–	9
Houston Baptist	0	–	9	1	–	10
$ – Conference champion; ^ – FCS playoff participant; Rankings from STATS poll

The 2017 McNeese State Cowboys football team represented McNeese State University as a member of the Southland Conference during the 2017 NCAA Division I FCS football season. Led by second-year head coach Lance Guidry, the Cowboys compiled an overall record of 9–2 with a mark of 7–2 in conference play, tying for third place in the Southland. McNeese State played home games at Cowboy Stadium in Lake Charles, Louisiana.

== Schedule ==
Date	Time	Opponent	Rank	Site	TV	Result	Attendance
August 31	7:00 p.m.	at Nicholls State		John L. Guidry Stadium; Thibodaux, LA	ESPN3	L 35–37	9,024
September 9	6:00 p.m.	Florida Tech*		Cowboy Stadium; Lake Charles, LA	AACI	W 42–21	11,101
September 16	6:00 p.m.	at Alcorn State*		Casem-Spinks Stadium; Lorman, MS	BAA	W 34–27	12,608
September 23	6:00 p.m.	Houston Baptist		Cowboy Stadium; Lake Charles, LA	FSSW+	W 27–12	11,398
September 30	6:00 p.m.	at Stephen F. Austin		Homer Bryce Stadium; Nacogdoches, TX	ESPN3	W 35–0	12,812
October 7	6:00 p.m.	at Abilene Christian		Wildcat Stadium; Abilene, TX	ELVN	W 13–7	10,564
October 21	6:00 p.m.	Incarnate Word^{†}	No. 20	Cowboy Stadium; Lake Charles, LA		W 55–7	9,732
October 28	6:00 p.m.	at No. 4 Central Arkansas	No. 20	Estes Stadium; Conway, AR (Red Beans and Rice Bowl)	ESPN3	L 17–47	9,887
November 4	6:00 p.m.	Southeastern Louisiana	No. 22	Cowboy Stadium; Lake Charles, LA	CST	W 13–3	7,332
November 11	6:00 p.m.	Northwestern State	No. 20	Cowboy Stadium; Lake Charles, LA (rivalry)	CST	W 44–24	10,132
November 18	6:00 p.m.	at Lamar	No. 19	Provost Umphrey Stadium; Beaumont, TX (Battle of the Border)	ESPN3	W 13–3	5,378
*Non-conference game; ^{†}Homecoming; Rankings from STATS Poll released prior to the game; All times are in Central time

== Game summaries ==
=== @ Nicholls ===
McNeese State at Nicholls State

Team	1	2	3	4	Total
Cowboys	6	3	13	13	35
• Colonels	7	0	14	16	37

- Date: August 31
- Location: John L. Guidry Stadium
  Thibodaux, LA
- Game start: 7:00 p.m. CDT
- Elapsed time: 3:39
- Game attendance: 9,024
- Game weather: 72 °F (22 °C) • WSW 4 • Overcast, some rain
- Referee: Ross Smith
- TV announcers (ESPN3): Play-by-Play: Lyn Rollins Analyst: Rene Nadeau Sideline: Carly McCord

Scoring summary
1	10:19	McNeese State	Trent Manuel 29 yard field goal, Drive: 11 plays, 63 yards, 4:41	3–0
1	8:45	Nicholls	Damion Jeanpiere Jr. 62 yard pass from Chase Fourcade (Lorran Fonseca kick), Drive: 4 plays, 79 yards, 1:27	3–7
1	3:15	McNeese State	Trent Manuel 21 yard field goal, Drive: 4 plays, 8 yards, 1:22	6–7
2	1:56	McNeese State	Trent Manuel 25 yard field goal, Drive: 4 plays, 7 yards, 1:22	9–7
3	10:52	McNeese State	Tavarious Battiste 30 yard pass from James Tabary (Trent Manuel kick), Drive: 4 plays, 17 yards, 2:58	16–7
3	6:18	Nicholls	Jonavon Lewis 67 yard interception return (Lorran Fonseca kick), Drive: 6 plays, 37 yards, 3:22	16–14
3	2:29	McNeese State	Darious Crawley 9 yard pass from James Tabary (Trent Manuel kick blocked), Drive: 5 plays, 22 yards, 3:07	22–14
3	2:07	Nicholls	Damion Jeanpiere Jr. 77 yard pass from Chase Fourcade (Lorran Fonseca kick), Drive: 1 play, 77 yards, 0:17	22–21
4	13:02	McNeese State	Tavarious Battiste 28 yard pass from James Tabary (Trent Manuel kick), Drive: 9 plays, 65 yards, 4:05	29–21
4	9:45	Nicholls	Raheem Falkins 12 yard pass from Chase Fourcade (two-point conv. failed), Drive: 9 plays, 65 yards, 3:17	29–27
4	5:43	Nicholls	Chase Fourcade 19 yard run (Lorran Fonseca kick), Drive: 1 play, 19 yards, 0:06	29–34
4	3:02	McNeese State	Nick Edwards 10 yard run (two-point conv. failed), Drive: 6 plays, 75 yards, 2:41	35–34
4	0:00	Nicholls	Lorran Fonseca 32 yard field goal, Drive: 10 plays, 53 yards, 2:57	35–37

=== Florida Tech ===
Florida Tech at McNeese State

Team	1	2	3	4	Total
Panthers	0	7	14	0	21
• Cowboys	14	7	7	14	42

- Date: September 9
- Location: Cowboy Stadium
  Lake Charles, LA
- Game start: 6:00 p.m. CDT
- Elapsed time: 3:05
- Game attendance: 11,101
- Game weather: 80 °F (27 °C) • NE 10 • Clear
- Referee: Dan Lewis
- TV announcers (AACI): Play-by-Play: Tom Hoefer Analyst: Johnny Suydam Sideline: Ron Hayes

Scoring summary
1	11:50	McNeese State	Justin Pratt 1 yard run (Trent Manuel kick), Drive: 7 plays, 48 yards, 2:51	7–0
1	6:47	McNeese State	Cyron Sutton 28 yard pass from James Tabary (Trent Manuel kick), Drive: 6 plays, 79 yards, 2:45	14–0
2	3:31	McNeese State	Justin Pratt 7 yard pass from James Tabary (Trent Manuel kick), Drive: 10 plays, 64 yards, 5:05	21–0
2	1:04	Florida Tech	Antwuan Haynes 11 yard pass from Mark Cato (Zachary Leatherman kick), Drive: 9 plays, 69 yards, 2:27	21–7
3	9:42	Florida Tech	Romell Guerrier 20 yard pass from Mark Cato (Zachary Leatherman kick), Drive: 3 plays, 56 yards, 1:00	21–14
3	4:12	McNeese State	Justin Pratt 4 yard run (Trent Manuel kick), Drive: 2 plays, 2 yards, 0:48	28–14
3	2:09	Florida Tech	Antwuan Haynes 19 yard run (Zachary Leatherman kick), Drive: 6 plays, 75 yards, 2:06	28–21
4	10:00	McNeese State	David Hamm 6 yard run (Trent Manuel kick), Drive: 12 plays, 74 yards, 7:09	35–21
4	1:18	McNeese State	Benjamin Jones 69 yard run (Trent Manuel kick), Drive: 4 plays, 84 yards, 1:40	42–21

=== @ Alcorn State ===
McNeese State at Alcorn State

Team	1	2	3	4	Total
• Cowboys	7	7	6	14	34
Braves	7	6	7	7	27

- Date: September 16
- Location: Jack Spinks Stadium
  Lorman, MS
- Game start: 6:00 p.m. CDT
- Elapsed time: 3:13
- Game attendance: 12,608
- Game weather: Low 80s • Clear
- Referee: Trennis Livings
- Television network: BAA

Scoring summary
1	6:47	Alcorn State	Norlando Veals 2 yard pass from Lenorris Footman (Corey McCullough kick), Drive: 10 plays, 67 yards, 6:35	0–7
1	3:12	McNeese State	Parker Orgeron 2 yard pass from James Tabary (Trent Manuel kick), Drive: 7 plays, 78 yards, 3:20	7–7
2	10:59	McNeese State	Cyron Sutton 24 yard pass from James Tabary (Trent Manuel kick), Drive: 6 plays, 85 yards, 2:38	14–7
2	9:40	Alcorn State	Marquis Warford 69 yard pass from Lenorris Footman (Corey McCullough kick failed), Drive: 3 plays, 82 yards, 1:12	14–13
3	13:12	McNeese State	Darious Crawley 20 yard pass from James Tabary (Trent Manuel kick failed), Drive: 4 plays, 70 yards, 1:41	20–13
3	2:38	Alcorn State	Lenorris Footman 7 yard pass from Norlando Veals (Corey McCullough kick), Drive: 6 plays, 74 yards, 2:11	20–20
4	13:13	McNeese State	Benjamin Jones 2 yard run (Gunnar Raborn kick), Drive: 9 plays, 74 yards, 4:22	27–20
4	12:33	Alcorn State	De'Lance Turner 70 yard pass from Lenorris Footman (Corey McCullough kick), Drive: 3 plays, 70 yards, 0:29	27–27
4	0:26	McNeese State	Kent Shelby 33 yard pass from James Tabary (Gunnar Raborn kick), Drive: 4 plays, 62 yards, 1:01	34–27

=== Houston Baptist ===
Houston Baptist at McNeese State

Team	1	2	3	4	Total
Huskies	10	0	0	2	12
• Cowboys	3	3	7	14	27

- Date: September 23
- Location: Cowboy Stadium
  Lake Charles, LA
- Game start: 6:00 p.m. CDT
- Elapsed time: 2:55
- Game attendance: 11,398
- Game weather: 86 °F (30 °C) • Partly Cloudy
- Referee: Ross Smith
- TV announcers (FSSW+): Play-by-Play: Ron Franklin Analyst: ND Kalu Sideline: Jessica Province

Scoring summary
1	7:03	McNeese State	Gunnar Raborn 40 yard field goal, Drive: 6 plays, 17 yards, 1:31	3–0
1	2:!5	Houston Baptist	Alec Chadwick 29 yard field goal, Drive: 12 plays, 66 yards, 4:48	3–3
1	2:00	Houston Baptist	Raphael Lewis 21 yard interception return (Alec Chadwick kick), Drive: 1 play, 0 yards, 0:15	3–10
2	0:54	McNeese State	Gunnar Raborn 25 yard field goal, Drive: 6 plays, 0 yards, 2:04	6–10
3	4:28	McNeese State	Kent Shelby 14 yard pass from James Tabary (Gunnar Raborn kick), Drive: 11 plays, 91 yards, 6:20	13–10
4	11:00	McNeese State	Darious Crawley 6 yard pass from James Tabary (Gunnar Raborn kick), Drive: 3 plays, 4 yards, 0:57	20–10
4	4:01	Houston Baptist	Team Safety, Drive: 1 play, -2 yards, 0:07	20–12
4	0:38	McNeese State	David Hamm 1 yard run (Gunnar Raborn kick), Drive: 6 plays, 42 yards, 3:01	27–12

=== @ Stephen F. Austin ===
McNeese State at Stephen F. Austin

Team	1	2	3	4	Total
• Cowboys	7	14	14	0	35
Lumberjacks	0	0	0	0	0

- Date: September 30
- Location: Homer Bryce Stadium
  Nacogdoches, TX
- Game start: 6:00 p.m. CDT
- Elapsed time: 3:12
- Game attendance: 12,812
- Game weather: 85 °F (29 °C) • ENE 8 • Sunny
- Referee: Vidal Jones
- TV announcers (ESPN3): Play-by-Play: Rob Meyers Analyst: Kevin Langford

Scoring summary
1	7:51	McNeese State	Cyron Sutton 15 yard run (Gunnar Raborn kick), Drive: 11 plays, 80 yards, 4:04	7–0
2	11:14	McNeese State	David Hamm 2 yard run (Gunnar Raborn kick), Drive: 5 plays, 69 yards, 1:51	14–0
2	1:41	McNeese State	Lawayne Ross 30 yard pass from James Tabary (Gunnar Raborn kick), Drive: 5 plays, 65 yards, 2:09	21–0
3	12:38	McNeese State	Kent Shelby 8 yard pass from James Tabary (Gunnar Raborn kick), Drive: 6 plays, 75 yards, 2:16	28–0
3	2:19	McNeese State	Parker Orgeron 29 yard pass from James Tabary (Gunnar Raborn kick), Drive: 3 plays, 31 yards, 0:55	35–0

=== @ Abilene Christian ===
McNeese State at Abilene Christian

Team	1	2	3	4	Total
• Cowboys	3	10	0	0	13
Wildcats	0	7	0	0	7

- Date: October 7
- Location: Wildcat Stadium
  Abilene, TX
- Game start: 6:00 p.m. CDT
- Elapsed time: 2:58
- Game attendance: 10,564
- Game weather: 76 °F (24 °C) • NE 5 • Clear
- Referee: C. Castleberry
- TV announcers (ELVN): Play-by-Play: David Saltzman Analyst: Keith Moreland Sideline: Whitley Pleasant

Scoring summary
1	3:23	McNeese State	Gunnar Raborn 32 yard field goal, Drive: 13 plays, 46 yards, 6:17	3–0
2	14:21	McNeese State	D. Crawley 22 yard pass from James Tabary (Gunnar Raborn kick), Drive: 8 plays, 69 yards, 3:07	10–0
2	11:43	Abilene Christian	Dallas Sealey 16 yard run (Nik Grau kick), Drive: 7 plays, 45 yards, 2:29	10–7
3	4:58	McNeese State	Gunnar Raborn 27 yard field goal, Drive: 15 plays, 67 yards, 6:40	13–7

=== Incarnate Word ===
Incarnate Word at McNeese State

Team	1	2	3	4	Total
Cowboys	7	0	0	0	7
• Lumberjacks	17	7	21	10	55

- Date: October 21
- Location: Cowboy Stadium
  Lake Charles, LA
- Game start: 6:00 p.m. CDT

Scoring summary
1	–
2	–
3	–
4	–

=== @ Central Arkansas ===
McNeese State at Central Arkansas

Team	1	2	3	4	Total
Bears	0	0	0	0	0
Cowboys	0	0	0	0	0

- Date: October 28
- Location: Cowboy Stadium
  Lake Charles, LA
- Game start: 6:00 p.m. CDT

Scoring summary
1	–
2	–
3	–
4	–

=== Southeastern Louisiana ===
Southeastern Louisiana at McNeese State

Team	1	2	3	4	Total
Lions	0	0	0	0	0
Cowboys	0	0	0	0	0

- Date: November 4
- Location: Cowboy Stadium
  Lake Charles, LA
- Game start: 6:00 p.m. CDT
- Television network: CST

Scoring summary
1	–
2	–
3	–
4	–

=== Northwestern State ===
Northwestern State at McNeese State

Team	1	2	3	4	Total
Demons	0	0	0	0	0
Cowboys	0	0	0	0	0

- Date: November 11
- Location: Cowboy Stadium
  Lake Charles, LA
- Game start: 6:00 p.m. CDT
- Television network: CST

Scoring summary
1	–
2	–
3	–
4	–

=== @ Lamar ===
Lamar at McNeese State

Team	1	2	3	4	Total
Cowboys	0	0	0	0	0
• Cardinals	14	14	7	6	41

- Date: November 18
- Location: Provost Umphrey Stadium
  Beaumont, TX
- Game start: 6:00 p.m. CST
- Television network: ESPN3

Scoring summary
1	–
2	–
3	–
4	–

== Ranking movements ==
Ranking movements Legend: ██ Increase in ranking ██ Decrease in ranking RV = Received votes
	Week													
Poll	Pre	1	2	3	4	5	6	7	8	9	10	11	12	Final
STATS FCS	RV	RV	RV	RV	RV	RV	22	20	20	22	20	19	19	22
Coaches	RV	RV	RV	RV	25	22	21	19	18	22	18	19	15	18
