= 2017 Central Arkansas Bears football team =

American college football season

2017 Central Arkansas Bears football

Southland Conference champion

FCS Playoffs Second Round, L 15–21 vs. New Hampshire
- Conference: Southland Conference

Ranking
- STATS: No. 10
- FCS Coaches: No. 8
- Record: 10–2 (9–0 Southland)
- Head coach: Steve Campbell (4th season)
- Offensive coordinator: Nathan Brown (4th season)
- Offensive scheme: Spread
- Defensive coordinator: Greg Stewart (4th season)
- Base defense: 4–3
- Home stadium: Estes Stadium

2017 Southland Conference football standings
	Conf.			Overall
Team	W		L	W		L
No. 10 Central Arkansas $^	9	–	0	10	–	2
No. 4 Sam Houston State ^	8	–	1	12	–	2
No. 25 Nicholls State ^	7	–	2	8	–	4
No. 22 McNeese State	7	–	2	9	–	2
Southeastern Louisiana	6	–	3	6	–	5
Northwestern State	4	–	5	4	–	7
Stephen F. Austin	4	–	5	4	–	7
Abilene Christian	2	–	7	2	–	9
Incarnate Word	1	–	7	1	–	10
Lamar	1	–	8	2	–	9
Houston Baptist	0	–	9	1	–	10
$ – Conference champion; ^ – FCS playoff participant; Rankings from STATS poll

The 2017 Central Arkansas Bears football team represented the University of Central Arkansas in the 2017 NCAA Division I FCS football season. The Bears were led by fourth-year head coach Steve Campbell and played their home games at Estes Stadium. They were a member of the Southland Conference. They finished the season 10–2, 9–0 in Southland play to be crowned Southland Conference champions. They received the Southland's automatic bid to the FCS Playoffs where they lost to New Hampshire in the Second Round.

On December 7, head coach Steve Campbell resigned to become the head coach at South Alabama. He finished at Central Arkansas with a four-year record of 33–15.

== Schedule ==
Date	Time	Opponent	Rank	Site	TV	Result	Attendance
September 2	6:10 p.m.	at No. 20 (FBS) Kansas State*	No. 15	Bill Snyder Family Football Stadium; Manhattan, KS	ESPN3	L 19–55	51,043
September 9	6:00 p.m.	at Murray State*	No. 15	Roy Stewart Stadium; Murray, KY	OVCDN	W 41–13	7,456
September 16	7:15 p.m.	Southeastern Louisiana	No. 14	Estes Stadium; Conway, AR	ELVN	W 38–6	10,237
September 30	6:00 p.m.	No. 3 Sam Houston State	No. 11	Estes Stadium; Conway, AR	ESPN3	W 41–30	11,347
October 7	6:00 p.m.	at Houston Baptist	No. 6	Husky Stadium; Houston, TX	FSSW+	W 27–7	2,543
October 14	6:00 p.m.	Stephen F. Austin	No. 6	Estes Stadium; Conway, AR	ESPN3	W 24–20	9,263
October 21	6:00 p.m.	at Northwestern State	No. 6	Harry Turpin Stadium; Natchitoches, LA	DemonTV	W 45–17	8,252
October 28	6:00 p.m.	No. 20 McNeese State^{†}	No. 4	Estes Stadium; Conway, AR (Red Beans and Rice Bowl)	ESPN3	W 47–17	9,887
November 4	6:10 p.m.	at Lamar	No. 4	Provost Umphrey Stadium; Beaumont, TX	ESPN3	W 42–14	8,417
November 11	6:00 p.m.	at Incarnate Word	No. 3	Gayle and Tom Benson Stadium; San Antonio, TX	UIWtv	W 56–10	4,652
November 18	3:00 p.m.	Abilene Christian	No. 3	Estes Stadium; Conway, AR	ESPN3	W 34–0	4,325
December 2	2:00 p.m.	No. 21 New Hampshire*	No. 3	Estes Stadium; Conway, AR (NCAA Division I Second Round)	ESPN3	L 15–21	6,243
*Non-conference game; ^{†}Homecoming; Rankings from STATS Poll released prior to the game; All times are in Central time

== Game summaries ==
=== At Kansas State ===
Central Arkansas at Kansas State

Team	1	2	3	4	Total
No. 15 Bears	10	6	3	0	19
• No. 20 (FBS) Wildcats	10	28	10	7	55

- Date: September 2
- Location: Bill Snyder Family Football Stadium
  Manhattan, KS
- Game start: 6:10 p.m. CDT
- Elapsed time: 3:11
- Game attendance: 51,043
- Game weather: 87 °F (31 °C) • WSW 7 • Clear
- Referee: Brandon Cruse
- TV announcers (ESPN3): Play-by-Play: Brian Smoller Analyst: Travis Tannahill

=== At Murray State ===
Central Arkansas at Murray State

Team	1	2	3	4	Total
• No. 15 Bears	10	21	7	3	41
Racers	0	6	0	7	13

- Date: September 9
- Location: Roy Stewart Stadium
  Murray, KY
- Game start: 6:00 p.m. CDT
- Elapsed time: 2:46
- Game attendance: 7,456
- Referee: Andrew Faust
- TV announcers (OVCDN): Play-by-Play: Neal Bradley Analyst: Josh McKeel

=== Southeastern Louisiana ===
Southeastern Louisiana at Central Arkansas

Team	1	2	3	4	Total
Lions	0	3	0	3	6
• No. 14 Bears	7	7	21	3	38

- Date: September 16
- Location: Estes Stadium
  Conway, AR
- Game start: 7:15 p.m. CDT
- Elapsed time: 2:58
- Game attendance: 10,237
- Referee: K. Boitman
- TV announcers (ELVN): Play-by-Play: Steve Sullivan Analyst: Fitz Hill

=== Sam Houston State ===
Sam Houston State at Central Arkansas

Team	1	2	3	4	Total
No. 3 Bearkats	7	10	7	6	30
• No. 11 Bears	14	17	3	7	41

- Date: September 30
- Location: Estes Stadium
  Conway, AR
- Game start: 6:00 p.m. CDT
- Elapsed time: 3:44
- Game attendance: 11,347
- Referee: Brandon Cruise
- TV announcers (ESPN3): Play-By-Play: Randy McIlvoy Analyst: Shea Walker Sideline: Tatum Everett

=== At Houston Baptist ===
Central Arkansas at Houston Baptist

Team	1	2	3	4	Total
• No. 6 Bears	14	0	7	6	27
Huskies	7	0	0	0	7

- Date: October 7
- Location: Husky Stadium
  Houston, TX
- Game start: 6:00 p.m. CDT
- Elapsed time: 2:23
- Game attendance: 2,543
- Game weather: 87 °F (31 °C) • WSW 7 • Clear
- Referee: Dan Lewis
- TV announcers (FSSW+): Play-by-Play: Tom Franklin Analyst: John Harris Sideline: Maya Golden

=== Stephen F. Austin ===
Stephen F. Austin at Central Arkansas

Team	1	2	3	4	Total
Lumberjacks	0	14	3	3	20
• No. 6 Bears	7	7	3	7	24

- Date: October 14
- Location: Estes Stadium
  Conway, AR
- Game start: 6:00 p.m. CDT
- Elapsed time: 3:25
- Game attendance: 9,263
- Referee: Vidal Jones
- TV announcers (ESPN3): Play-by-Play: Lincoln Rose Analyst: Nate Griffin

=== At Northwestern State ===
Central Arkansas at Northwestern State

Team	1	2	3	4	Total
• No. 6 Bears	10	14	14	7	45
Demons	3	7	7	0	17

- Date: October 21
- Location: Harry Turpin Stadium
  Natchitoches, LA
- Game start: 6:00 p.m. CDT
- Elapsed time: 5:06
- Game attendance: 8,252
- Game weather: 82 °F (28 °C) • SSE 5 • Overcast
- Referee: Ross Smith
- TV announcers (DTV): Play-by-Play: Patrick Netherton Analyst: Richard deVargas Sideline: Tony Taglavore

=== McNeese State ===
McNeese State at Central Arkansas
(homecoming)

Team	1	2	3	4	Total
No. 20 Cowboys	10	0	7	0	17
• No. 4 Bears	9	21	14	3	47

- Date: October 28
- Location: Estes Stadium
  Conway, AR
- Game start: 6:00 p.m. CDT
- Elapsed time: 3:30
- Game attendance: 9,887
- Referee: Scott Campbell
- TV announcers (ESPN3): Play-by-Play: Jeff Brightwell Analyst: Stan Humphries Sideline: Tatum Everett

=== At Lamar ===
Central Arkansas at Lamar

Team	1	2	3	4	Total
• No. 4 Bears	14	7	21	0	42
Cardinals	7	0	0	7	14

- Date: November 4
- Location: Provost Umphrey Stadium
  Beaumont, TX
- Game start: 6:10 p.m. CST
- Elapsed time: 3:03
- Game attendance: 8,417
- Game weather: 78 °F (26 °C) • S 8 • Partly cloudy
- TV announcers (ESPN3): Play-by-Play: Dan Gresham Analyst: Lemont Williams

=== At Incarnate Word ===
Central Arkansas at Incarnate Word

Team	1	2	3	4	Total
• No. 3 Bears	14	28	0	14	56
Cardinals	3	0	0	7	10

- Date: November 11
- Location: Gayle and Tom Benson Stadium
  San Antonio, TX
- Game start: 6:00 p.m. CST
- Elapsed time: 2:50
- Game attendance: 4,652
- Game weather: 67 °F (19 °C) • E 7 • Cloudy, showers
- Referee: Ray Edwards
- TV announcers (UIWtv): Play-by-Play: Chris Reyes Analyst: Jaime Valdez

=== Abilene Christian ===
Abilene Christian at Central Arkansas

Team	1	2	3	4	Total
Wildcats	0	0	0	0	0
• No. 3 Bears	14	6	7	7	34

- Date: November 18
- Location: Estes Stadium
  Conway, AR
- Game start: 3:00 p.m. CST
- Game attendance: 4,325

== FCS Playoffs ==
=== New Hampshire–Second Round ===
FCS Playoffs Second Round

Team	1	2	3	4	Total
• No. 21 Wildcats	7	0	7	7	21
No. 3 Bears	7	0	0	8	15

- Date: December 2
- Location: Estes Stadium
  Conway, AR
- Game start: 2:00 p.m. CST
- Television network: ESPN3

== Ranking movements ==
Ranking movements Legend: ██ Increase in ranking ██ Decrease in ranking
	Week													
Poll	Pre	1	2	3	4	5	6	7	8	9	10	11	12	Final
STATS FCS	15	15	14	12	11	6	6	6	4	4	3	3	3	10
Coaches	15	16	16	13	12	8	6	6	4	4	3	3	3	8
