= 2010 Middle Tennessee Blue Raiders football team =

American college football season

2010 Middle Tennessee Blue Raiders football

GoDaddy.com Bowl champion

GoDaddy.com Bowl, L 21–35 vs. Miami (OH)
- Conference: Sun Belt Conference
- Record: 6–7 (5–3 Sun Belt)
- Head coach: Rick Stockstill (5th season)
- Offensive coordinator: Mike Schultz (1st season)
- Offensive scheme: Spread
- Defensive coordinator: Randall McCray (1st season)
- Base defense: 4–3
- Home stadium: Johnny "Red" Floyd Stadium

2010 Sun Belt Conference football standings
	Conf.			Overall
Team	W		L	W		L
Troy +	6	–	2	8	–	5
FIU +	6	–	2	7	–	6
Middle Tennessee	5	–	3	6	–	7
Louisiana–Monroe	4	–	4	5	–	7
Arkansas State	4	–	4	4	–	8
Florida Atlantic	3	–	5	4	–	8
Louisiana–Lafayette	3	–	5	3	–	9
North Texas	3	–	5	3	–	9
Western Kentucky	2	–	6	2	–	10
+ – Conference co-champions

The 2010 Middle Tennessee Blue Raiders football team represented Middle Tennessee State University as a member of the Sun Belt Conference during the 2010 NCAA Division I FBS football season. Led by fifth-year head coach Rick Stockstill, the Blue Raiders compiled an overall record 6–7 with a mark of 5–3 in conference play, placing third in the Sun Belt. Middle Tennessee was invited to the GoDaddy.com Bowl, where they lost to the Miami RedHawks, 35–21. The team played home games at Johnny "Red" Floyd Stadium in Murfreesboro, Tennessee.

== During the off season ==
In January 2010, defensive coordinator, Manny Diaz, left Middle Tennessee and accepted the defensive coordinator job at Mississippi State. Weeks later, Wisconsin assistant Randall McCray was hired to lead the defense.

In February 2010, offense coordinator Tony Franklin left Middle Tennessee to accept the vacant position of offensive coordinator at Louisiana Tech. On March 3, Mike Schultz, former TCU and Illinois offensive coordinator, was hired to coach the Blue Raider offense.

== Schedule ==
Date	Time	Opponent	Site	TV	Result	Attendance
April 10	1:00 pm	Blue-White Spring Game	Johnny "Red" Floyd Stadium; Murfreesboro, TN		White 56–42	3,110
September 2	6:30 pm	Minnesota*	Johnny "Red" Floyd Stadium; Murfreesboro, TN	ESPNU	L 17–24	25,908
September 11	6:00 pm	Austin Peay*	Johnny "Red" Floyd Stadium; Murfreesboro, TN		W 56–33	16,806
September 18	6:00 pm	at Memphis*	Liberty Bowl Memorial Stadium; Memphis, TN		L 17–24	27,965
September 25	6:00 pm	at Louisiana–Lafayette	Cajun Field; Lafayette, LA		W 34–14	17,249
October 5	7:00 pm	Troy	Johnny "Red" Floyd Stadium; Murfreesboro, TN (Battle for the Palladium)	ESPN2	L 13–42	28,010
October 16	2:30 pm	at Georgia Tech*	Bobby Dodd Stadium; Atlanta, GA	ESPN3	L 14–42	40,652
October 23	3:30 pm	Louisiana-Monroe^{†}	Johnny "Red" Floyd Stadium; Murfreesboro, TN		W 38–10	19,052
November 2	6:00 pm	at Arkansas State	ASU Stadium; Jonesboro, AR	ESPN2	L 24–51	13,589
November 13	2:30 pm	North Texas	Johnny "Red" Floyd Stadium; Murfreesboro, TN		L 17–23	14,227
November 20	3:30 pm	at Western Kentucky	Houchens Industries–L. T. Smith Stadium; Bowling Green, KY (rivalry)	CSS	W 27–26	12,322
November 27	2:30 pm	Florida Atlantic	Johnny "Red" Floyd Stadium; Murfreesboro, TN		W 38–14	10,140
December 4	5:00 pm	at FIU	FIU Stadium; Miami, FL	ESPN3	W 28–27	16,628
January 6	7:00 pm	vs. Miami (OH)*	Ladd–Peebles Stadium; Mobile, AL (GoDaddy.com Bowl)	ESPN	L 21–35	38,168
*Non-conference game; ^{†}Homecoming; All times are in Central time

== Game summaries ==
=== Minnesota ===
	1	2	3	4	Total
Golden Gophers	7	7	0	10	24
Blue Raiders	0	14	3	0	17

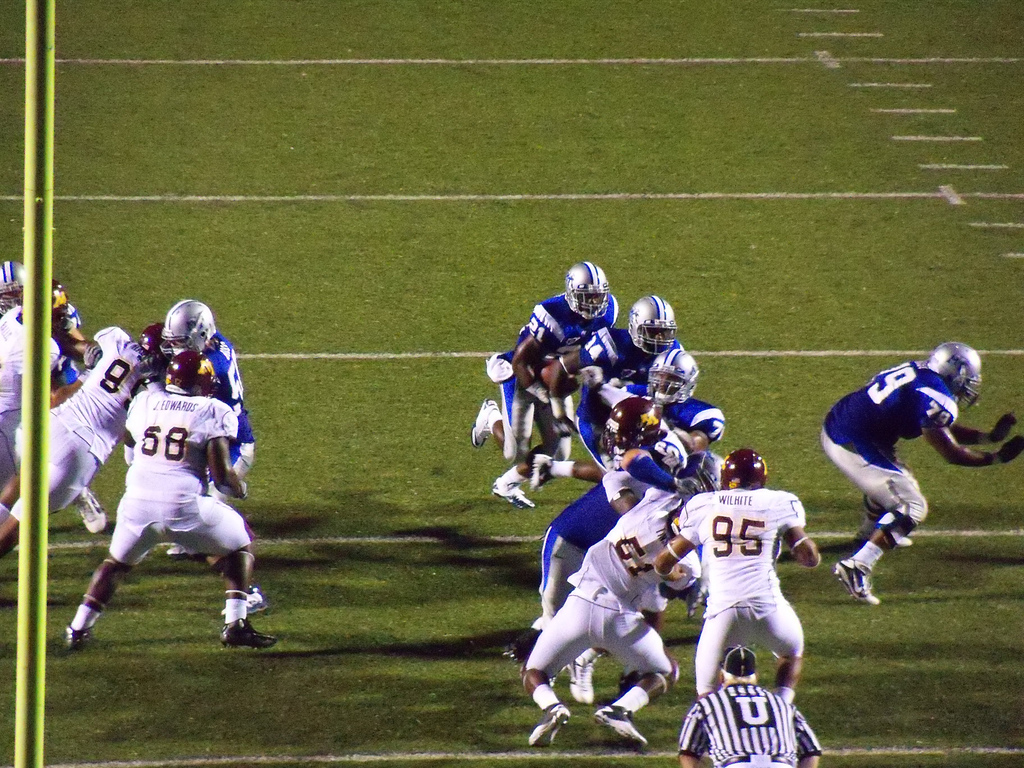
Phillip Tanner carries the ball late in the second quarter.

=== Austin Peay ===
	1	2	3	4	Total
Governors	3	14	16	0	33
Blue Raiders	14	21	7	14	56

=== Memphis ===
	1	2	3	4	Total
Blue Raiders	3	7	7	0	17
Tigers	3	14	7	0	24

=== Louisiana–Lafayette ===
	1	2	3	4	Total
Blue Raiders	3	17	14	0	34
Ragin' Cajuns	0	14	0	0	14

=== Troy ===
	1	2	3	4	Total
Trojans	14	7	7	14	42
Blue Raiders	0	7	0	6	13

=== Georgia Tech ===
	1	2	3	4	Total
Blue Raiders	0	7	0	7	14
Yellow Jackets	7	7	21	7	42

=== Louisiana–Monroe ===
	1	2	3	4	Total
Warhawks	3	0	0	7	10
Blue Raiders	7	21	3	7	38

=== Arkansas State ===
	1	2	3	4	Total
Blue Raiders	10	7	0	7	24
Red Wolves	13	10	14	14	51

=== North Texas ===
	1	2	3	4	Total
Mean Green	14	3	3	3	23
Blue Raiders	0	10	7	0	17

=== Western Kentucky ===
	1	2	3	4	Total
Blue Raiders	7	3	3	14	27
Hilltoppers	13	6	7	0	26

=== Florida Atlantic ===
	1	2	3	4	Total
Owls	7	0	0	7	14
Blue Raiders	7	7	10	14	38

=== FIU ===
	1	2	3	4	Total
Blue Raiders	7	7	7	7	28
Golden Panthers	14	3	3	7	27

=== Miami (OH)–GoDaddy.com Bowl ===
	1	2	3	4	Total
Blue Raiders	14	0	7	0	21
RedHawks	7	7	14	7	35

== Coaching staff ==
- Head coach: Rick Stockstill
- Defensive line: John Palermo
- Offensive coordinator, quarterbacks: Mike Schultz
- Offensive line: Jimmy Ray Stephens
- Wide receivers: Justin Watts
- Inside receivers: Brent Brock
- Defensive coordinator, linebackers: Randall McCray
- Running backs: Willie Simmons
- Safeties: David Bibee
- Cornerbacks: Steve Ellis
- Strength: Russell Patterson

== After the season ==
=== NFL draft ===
The following Blue Raider was selected in the 2011 NFL draftt following the season.

Round	Pick	Player	Position	NFL club
5	147	Rod Issac	Defensive back	Jacksonville Jaguars
