= 2017 Stephen F. Austin Lumberjacks football team =

American college football season

2017 Stephen F. Austin Lumberjacks football
- Conference: Southland Conference
- Record: 4–7 (4–5 Southland)
- Head coach: Clint Conque (4th season)
- Offensive coordinator: Gary Crowton (2nd season)
- Defensive coordinator: Jeff Byrd (1st season)
- Home stadium: Homer Bryce Stadium

2017 Southland Conference football standings
	Conf.			Overall
Team	W		L	W		L
No. 10 Central Arkansas $^	9	–	0	10	–	2
No. 4 Sam Houston State ^	8	–	1	12	–	2
No. 25 Nicholls State ^	7	–	2	8	–	4
No. 22 McNeese State	7	–	2	9	–	2
Southeastern Louisiana	6	–	3	6	–	5
Northwestern State	4	–	5	4	–	7
Stephen F. Austin	4	–	5	4	–	7
Abilene Christian	2	–	7	2	–	9
Incarnate Word	1	–	7	1	–	10
Lamar	1	–	8	2	–	9
Houston Baptist	0	–	9	1	–	10
$ – Conference champion; ^ – FCS playoff participant; Rankings from STATS poll

The 2017 Stephen F. Austin football team represented Stephen F. Austin State University in the 2017 NCAA Division I FCS football season. The Lumberjacks were coached by fourth-year head coach Clint Conque and played their home games at Homer Bryce Stadium. They played as a member of the Southland Conference. They finished the season 4–7, 4–5 in Southland play to finish in a tie for sixth place.

== Schedule ==
Date	Time	Opponent	Site	TV	Result	Attendance
September 2	6:00 p.m.	at SMU*	Gerald J. Ford Stadium; Dallas, TX	ESPN3	L 14–58	20,478
September 9	6:00 p.m.	Southern Utah*	Homer Bryce Stadium; Nacogdoches, TX	ESPN3	L 14–51	12,324
September 16	6:00 p.m.	Incarnate Word	Homer Bryce Stadium; Nacogdoches, TX	ESPN3	W 37–31	11,401
September 23	6:00 p.m.	at Abilene Christian	Wildcat Stadium; Abilene, TX		W 20–10	11,645
September 30	6:00 p.m.	McNeese State	Homer Bryce Stadium; Nacogdoches, TX	ESPN3	L 0–35	12,812
October 7	1:00 p.m.	vs. No. 9 Sam Houston State	NRG Stadium; Houston, TX (Battle of the Piney Woods)	ESPN3	L 16–27	26,792
October 14	6:00 p.m.	at No. 6 Central Arkansas	Estes Stadium; Conway, AR	ESPN3	L 20–24	9,263
October 21	3:00 p.m.	Houston Baptist	Homer Bryce Stadium; Nacogdoches, TX	ESPN3	W 27–10	11,996
October 28	6:00 p.m.	at Lamar	Provost Umphrey Stadium; Beaumont, TX	ESPN3	W 34–7	6,122
November 11	3:00 p.m.	Nicholls State	Homer Bryce Stadium; Nacogdoches, TX	ESPN3	L 13–34	8,348
November 18	3:00 p.m.	at Northwestern State	Harry Turpin Stadium; Natchitoches, LA (Chief Caddo)		L 21–38	4,257
*Non-conference game; Rankings from STATS Poll released prior to the game; All times are in Central time
