= 2017 Northwestern State Demons football team =

American college football season

2017 Northwestern State Demons football
- Conference: Southland Conference
- Record: 4–7 (4–5 Southland)
- Head coach: Jay Thomas (5th season)
- Offensive coordinator: Kyle Manley (1st season)
- Defensive coordinator: Brad Laird (8th season)
- Home stadium: Harry Turpin Stadium

2017 Southland Conference football standings
	Conf.			Overall
Team	W		L	W		L
No. 10 Central Arkansas $^	9	–	0	10	–	2
No. 4 Sam Houston State ^	8	–	1	12	–	2
No. 25 Nicholls State ^	7	–	2	8	–	4
No. 22 McNeese State	7	–	2	9	–	2
Southeastern Louisiana	6	–	3	6	–	5
Northwestern State	4	–	5	4	–	7
Stephen F. Austin	4	–	5	4	–	7
Abilene Christian	2	–	7	2	–	9
Incarnate Word	1	–	7	1	–	10
Lamar	1	–	8	2	–	9
Houston Baptist	0	–	9	1	–	10
$ – Conference champion; ^ – FCS playoff participant; Rankings from STATS poll

The 2017 Northwestern State Demons football team represented Northwestern State University as a member of the Southland Conference during the 2017 NCAA Division I FCS football season. Led by Jay Thomas in his fifth and final season as head coach, the Demons compiled an overall record of 4–7 with a mark of 4–5 in conference play, tying for sixth place in the Southland. Northwestern State played home games at Harry Turpin Stadium in Natchitoches, Louisiana.

Thomas's contract was not renewed after the season. He finished his tenure as Northwestern State with a five-year record of 21–36.

== Schedule ==
Date	Time	Opponent	Site	TV	Result	Attendance
September 2	6:00 p.m.	at Louisiana Tech*	Joe Aillet Stadium; Ruston, LA	ESPN3	L 24–52	24,002
September 9	6:00 p.m.	at No. 24 Grambling State*	Eddie Robinson Stadium; Grambling, LA		L 10–23	12,689
September 16	6:00 p.m.	Lamar	Harry Turpin Stadium; Natchitoches, LA	CST, ESPN3	W 35–28	11,125
September 30	6:20 p.m.	Southeastern Louisiana	Harry Turpin Stadium; Natchitoches, LA (rivalry)	CST, ESPN3	L 20–49	9,073
October 7	6:30 p.m.	at Nicholls State	John L. Guidry Stadium; Thibodaux, LA (NSU Challenge)	CST	L 10–14	5,011
October 14	6:00 p.m.	at No. 9 Sam Houston State	Bowers Stadium; Huntsville, TX		L 36–40	5,229
October 21	6:00 p.m.	No. 6 Central Arkansas^{†}	Harry Turpin Stadium; Natchitoches, LA	DTV	L 17–45	8,252
October 28	6:00 p.m.	at Houston Baptist	Husky Stadium; Houston, TX		W 10–7	2,317
November 4	6:00 p.m.	Abilene Christian	Harry Turpin Stadium; Natchitoches, LA	DTV	W 26–23	5,042
November 11	6:00 p.m.	at No. 20 McNeese State	Cowboy Stadium; Lake Charles, LA (rivalry)	CST	L 24–44	10,132
November 18	3:00 p.m.	Stephen F. Austin	Harry Turpin Stadium; Natchitoches, LA (Chief Caddo)	DTV	W 38–21	4,257
*Non-conference game; ^{†}Homecoming; Rankings from STATS Poll released prior to the game; All times are in Central time
