= 2017 Nicholls State Colonels football team =

American college football season

2017 Nicholls State Colonels football

NCAA Division I First Round, L 31–38 vs. South Dakota
- Conference: Southland Conference

Ranking
- STATS: No. 25
- FCS Coaches: No. 23
- Record: 8–4 (7–2 Southland)
- Head coach: Tim Rebowe (3rd season)
- Offensive coordinator: Rob Christophel (3rd season)
- Offensive scheme: Spread
- Defensive coordinator: Tommy Rybacki (3rd season)
- Base defense: Multiple 4–3
- Home stadium: John L. Guidry Stadium

2017 Southland Conference football standings
	Conf.			Overall
Team	W		L	W		L
No. 10 Central Arkansas $^	9	–	0	10	–	2
No. 4 Sam Houston State ^	8	–	1	12	–	2
No. 25 Nicholls State ^	7	–	2	8	–	4
No. 22 McNeese State	7	–	2	9	–	2
Southeastern Louisiana	6	–	3	6	–	5
Northwestern State	4	–	5	4	–	7
Stephen F. Austin	4	–	5	4	–	7
Abilene Christian	2	–	7	2	–	9
Incarnate Word	1	–	7	1	–	10
Lamar	1	–	8	2	–	9
Houston Baptist	0	–	9	1	–	10
$ – Conference champion; ^ – FCS playoff participant; Rankings from STATS poll

The 2017 Nicholls State Colonels football team represented Nicholls State University as a member of the Southland Conference during the 2017 NCAA Division I FCS football season. Led by third-year head coach Tim Rebowe, the Colonels compiled an overall record of 8–4 with a mark of 7–2 in conference play, tying for third place in the Southland. Nicholls State received an at-large bid to the NCAA Division I Football Championship, losing to South Dakota in the first round. The team played home games at John L. Guidry Stadium in Thibodaux, Louisiana.

== Schedule ==
Date	Time	Opponent	Rank	Site	TV	Result	Attendance
August 31	7:00 p.m.	McNeese State		John L. Guidry Stadium; Thibodaux, LA	ESPN3	W 37–35	9,024
September 9	6:00 p.m.	at Texas A&M*		Kyle Field; College Station, TX	ESPNU	L 14–24	100,276
September 16	6:00 p.m.	Prairie View A&M*		John L. Guidry Stadium; Thibodaux, LA	SLDN	W 44–13	8,212
September 23	6:00 p.m.	at No. 3 Sam Houston State		Bowers Stadium; Huntsville, TX	ESPN3	L 17–66	12,863
September 30	7:00 p.m.	at Lamar		Provost Umphrey Stadium; Beaumont, TX	ESPN3	W 41–14	6,167
October 7	6:30 p.m.	Northwestern State^{†}		John L. Guidry Stadium; Thibodaux, LA (NSU Challenge)	CST	W 14–10	5,011
October 14	3:00 p.m.	Abilene Christian		John L. Guidry Stadium; Thibodaux, LA	CST	W 29–20	7,233
October 28	2:00 p.m.	at Incarnate Word		Gayle and Tom Benson Stadium; San Antonio, TX		W 38–31	4,999
November 4	3:00 p.m.	Houston Baptist		John L. Guidry Stadium; Thibodaux, LA	SLDN	W 23–17	8,203
November 11	3:00 p.m.	at Stephen F. Austin		Homer Bryce Stadium; Nacogdoches, TX	ESPN3	W 34–13	8,348
November 16	6:30 p.m.	at Southeastern Louisiana	No. 25	Strawberry Stadium; Hammond, LA (River Bell Classic)	CST	L 17–21	6,866
November 25	3:00 p.m.	No. 16 South Dakota*		John L. Guidry Stadium; Thibodaux, LA (NCAA Division I First Round)	ESPN3	L 31–38	9,612
*Non-conference game; ^{†}Homecoming; Rankings from STATS Poll released prior to the game; All times are in Central time

== Ranking movements ==
Ranking movements Legend: ██ Increase in ranking ██ Decrease in ranking — = Not ranked RV = Received votes
	Week													
Poll	Pre	1	2	3	4	5	6	7	8	9	10	11	12	Final
STATS FCS	—	—	RV	RV	RV	RV	RV	RV	RV	RV	RV	25	RV	25
Coaches	RV	RV	RV	23	RV	25	23	20	23	17	17	17	22	23
