= 2017 Houston Baptist Huskies football team =

American college football season

2017 Houston Baptist Huskies football
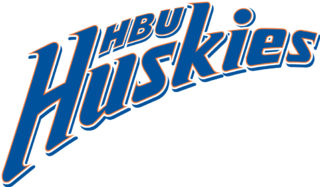
- Conference: Southland Conference
- Record: 1–10 (0–9 Southland)
- Head coach: Vic Shealy (5th season)
- Offensive coordinator: Scott Smith (5th season)
- Offensive scheme: Multiple
- Co-defensive coordinators: Roger Hinshaw (5th season); Charlie Camp (3rd season)
- Base defense: 4–3
- Home stadium: Husky Stadium

2017 Southland Conference football standings
	Conf.			Overall
Team	W		L	W		L
No. 10 Central Arkansas $^	9	–	0	10	–	2
No. 4 Sam Houston State ^	8	–	1	12	–	2
No. 25 Nicholls State ^	7	–	2	8	–	4
No. 22 McNeese State	7	–	2	9	–	2
Southeastern Louisiana	6	–	3	6	–	5
Northwestern State	4	–	5	4	–	7
Stephen F. Austin	4	–	5	4	–	7
Abilene Christian	2	–	7	2	–	9
Incarnate Word	1	–	7	1	–	10
Lamar	1	–	8	2	–	9
Houston Baptist	0	–	9	1	–	10
$ – Conference champion; ^ – FCS playoff participant; Rankings from STATS poll

The 2017 Houston Baptist Huskies football team represented Houston Baptist University—now known as Houston Christian University—as a member of the Southland Conference during the 2017 NCAA Division I FCS football season. Led by fifth-year head coach Vic Shealy the Huskies compiled an overall record of 1–10 with a mark of 0–9 in conference play, placing last out of 11 teams in the Southland. Houston Baptist played home games at Husky Stadium in Houston.

== Schedule ==
Date	Time	Opponent	Site	TV	Result	Attendance
September 2	6:00 p.m.	at Texas State	Bobcat Stadium; San Marcos, TX	ESPN3	L 11–20	15,560
September 9	7:30 p.m.	at Texas Southern*	BBVA Compass Stadium; Houston, TX	AT&T SW	W 24–17	6,218
September 16	6:00 p.m.	at Abilene Christian	Wildcat Stadium; Abilene, TX	ESPN3	L 3–24	12,000
September 23	6:00 p.m.	at McNeese State	Cowboy Stadium; Lake Charles, LA	FSSW+	L 12–27	11,398
October 7	6:00 p.m.	No. 6 Central Arkansas	Husky Stadium; Houston, TX	FSSW+	L 7–27	2,543
October 14	6:00 p.m.	Southeastern Louisiana	Husky Stadium; Houston, TX		L 10–56	1,827
October 21	3:00 p.m.	at Stephen F. Austin	Homer Bryce Stadium; Nacogdoches, TX	ESPN3	L 10–27	11,996
October 28	6:00 p.m.	Northwestern State^{†}	Husky Stadium; Houston, TX		L 7–10	2,317
November 4	3:00 p.m.	at Nicholls State	John L. Guidry Stadium; Thibodaux, LA	Eleven Sports	L 17–23	8,203
November 11	2:00 p.m.	Lamar	Husky Stadium; Houston, TX	FCS Central	L 16–23	2,311
November 18	1:00 p.m.	at Sam Houston State	Bowers Stadium; Huntsville, TX	ESPN3	L 33–53	6,515
*Non-conference game; ^{†}Homecoming; Rankings from STATS Poll released prior to the game; All times are in Central time

* Games were televised on tape delay.
