= 2017 Southeastern Louisiana Lions football team =

American college football season

2017 Southeastern Louisiana Lions football
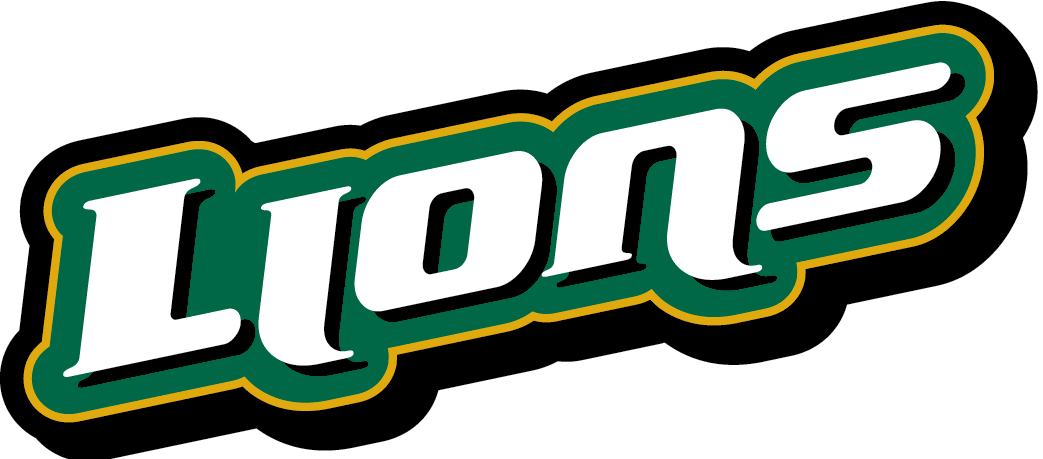
- Conference: Southland Conference
- Record: 6–5 (6–3 Southland)
- Head coach: Ron Roberts (6th season)
- Offensive coordinator: Matt Barrett (2nd season)
- Defensive coordinator: Ron Roberts (6th season)
- Home stadium: Strawberry Stadium

2017 Southland Conference football standings
	Conf.			Overall
Team	W		L	W		L
No. 10 Central Arkansas $^	9	–	0	10	–	2
No. 4 Sam Houston State ^	8	–	1	12	–	2
No. 25 Nicholls State ^	7	–	2	8	–	4
No. 22 McNeese State	7	–	2	9	–	2
Southeastern Louisiana	6	–	3	6	–	5
Northwestern State	4	–	5	4	–	7
Stephen F. Austin	4	–	5	4	–	7
Abilene Christian	2	–	7	2	–	9
Incarnate Word	1	–	7	1	–	10
Lamar	1	–	8	2	–	9
Houston Baptist	0	–	9	1	–	10
$ – Conference champion; ^ – FCS playoff participant; Rankings from STATS poll

The 2017 Southeastern Louisiana Lions football team represented Southeastern Louisiana University in the 2017 NCAA Division I FCS football season. The Lions were led by sixth-year head coach Ron Roberts and played their home games at Strawberry Stadium. They were a member of the Southland Conference. They finished the season 6–5, 6–3 in Southland play to finish in fifth place.

On January 19, head coach Ron Roberts resigned to become the defensive coordinator at Louisiana. He finished at Southeastern Louisiana with a six-year record of 42–29.

== Schedule ==
Date	Time	Opponent	Site	TV	Result	Attendance
September 2	6:00 p.m.	at Louisiana*	Cajun Field; Lafayette, LA (Cypress Mug)	ESPN3	L 48–51	18,289
September 9	7:00 p.m.	Bethune–Cookman*	Strawberry Stadium; Hammond, LA	ELVN	L 23–28	6,321
September 16	7:15 p.m.	at No. 14 Central Arkansas	Estes Stadium; Conway, AR	ELVN	L 6–38	10,237
September 23	7:00 p.m.	Lamar	Strawberry Stadium; Hammond, LA	LionVision	W 49–21	4,728
September 30	6:30 p.m.	at Northwestern State	Harry Turpin Stadium; Natchitoches, LA (rivalry)	CST, ESPN3	W 49–20	9,073
October 7	10:00 a.m. (Note: Game was originally scheduled for 4:00 p.m. CST, but was moved up due to the threat of inclement weather.)	Incarnate Word^{†}	Strawberry Stadium; Hammond, LA	LionVision	W 49–30	4,156
October 14	6:00 p.m.	at Houston Baptist	Husky Stadium; Houston, TX	ESPN3	W 56–10	1,827
October 21	2:30 p.m.	at Abilene Christian	Wildcat Stadium; Abilene, TX		W 56–21	12,000
October 28	7:00 p.m.	No. 5 Sam Houston State	Strawberry Stadium; Hammond, LA	ESPN3	L 23–33	6,027
November 4	6:00 p.m.	at McNeese State	Cowboy Stadium; Lake Charles, LA		L 3–13	7,332
November 16	6:00 p.m.	Nicholls State	Strawberry Stadium; Hammond, LA (River Bell Classic)	CST, ESPN3	W 21–17	6,866
*Non-conference game; ^{†}Homecoming; Rankings from STATS Poll released prior to the game; All times are in Central time

== Game summaries ==
=== At Louisiana ===
Broadcasters: David Saltzman & Bobby Carpenter

	1	2	3	4	Total
Lions	21	14	0	13	48
Ragin' Cajuns	21	14	7	9	51

=== Bethune-Cookman ===
Broadcasters: Lyn Rollins, Butch Alsandor, & Meghan Kluth

	1	2	3	4	Total
Wildcats	14	0	0	14	28
Lions	3	6	7	7	23

=== At No. 14 Central Arkansas ===
Broadcasters: Steve Sullivan & Fitz Hill

	1	2	3	4	Total
Lions	0	3	0	3	6
#14 Bears	7	7	21	3	38

=== Lamar ===
Broadcasters: John Sartori, Wesley Boone, & Richie Solares

	1	2	3	4	Total
Cardinals	7	7	7	0	21
Lions	21	14	7	7	49

=== At Northwestern State ===
Broadcasters:

	1	2	3	4	Total
Lions	14	28	7	0	49
Demons	6	7	0	7	20

=== Incarnate Word ===
Broadcasters:

	1	2	3	4	Total
Cardinals	3	17	3	7	30
Lions	7	21	0	21	49

=== At Houston Baptist ===
Broadcasters:

	1	2	3	4	Total
Lions	7	14	21	14	56
Huskies	3	0	0	7	10

=== At Abilene Christian ===
Broadcasters:

	1	2	3	4	Total
Lions	7	14	14	21	56
Wildcats	3	10	0	8	21

=== No. 5 Sam Houston State ===
Broadcasters:

	1	2	3	4	Total
#5 Bearkats	9	7	10	7	33
Lions	3	13	7	0	23

=== At McNeese State ===
Broadcasters:

	1	2	3	4	Total
Lions	0	3	0	0	3
Cowboys	0	0	6	7	13

=== Nicholls State ===
Broadcasters:

	1	2	3	4	Total
Colonels	7	7	3	0	17
Lions	7	0	14	0	21
