= 2017 Lamar Cardinals football team =

American college football season

2017 Lamar Cardinals football
- Conference: Southland Conference
- Record: 2–9 (1–8 Southland)
- Head coach: Mike Schultz (1st season)
- Offensive coordinator: Dan Dodd (1st season)
- Offensive scheme: Spread
- Co-defensive coordinators: Troy Douglas (1st season); Melvin Smith (1st season)
- Base defense: 4–3
- Home stadium: Provost Umphrey Stadium

2017 Southland Conference football standings
	Conf.			Overall
Team	W		L	W		L
No. 10 Central Arkansas $^	9	–	0	10	–	2
No. 4 Sam Houston State ^	8	–	1	12	–	2
No. 25 Nicholls State ^	7	–	2	8	–	4
No. 22 McNeese State	7	–	2	9	–	2
Southeastern Louisiana	6	–	3	6	–	5
Northwestern State	4	–	5	4	–	7
Stephen F. Austin	4	–	5	4	–	7
Abilene Christian	2	–	7	2	–	9
Incarnate Word	1	–	7	1	–	10
Lamar	1	–	8	2	–	9
Houston Baptist	0	–	9	1	–	10
$ – Conference champion; ^ – FCS playoff participant; Rankings from STATS poll

The 2017 Lamar Cardinals football team represented Lamar University in the 2017 NCAA Division I FCS football season. The Cardinals were led by first-year head coach Mike Schultz and play their home games at Provost Umphrey Stadium. They played as a member of the Southland Conference. They finished the season 2–9, 1–8 in Southland play to finish in tenth place.

== Schedule ==
Date	Time	Opponent	Site	TV	Result	Attendance
September 2	6:00 p.m.	at North Texas*	Apogee Stadium; Denton, TX	ESPN3	L 14–59	19,592
September 9	7:00 p.m.	UT Permian Basin*	Provost Umphrey Stadium; Beaumont, TX	ESPN3	W 72–6	7,072
September 16	6:00 p.m.	at Northwestern State	Harry Turpin Stadium; Natchitoches, LA	ESPN3	L 28–35	11,125
September 23	7:00 p.m.	at Southeastern Louisiana	Strawberry Stadium; Hammond, LA	Facebook	L 21–49	4,728
September 30	7:00 p.m.	Nicholls State	Provost Umphrey Stadium; Beaumont, TX	ESPN3	L 14–41	6,167
October 14	6:00 p.m.	at Incarnate Word	Gayle and Tom Benson Stadium; San Antonio, TX		L 24–33	5,001
October 21	3:00 p.m.	at No. 7 Sam Houston State	Bowers Stadium; Huntsville, TX	ESPN3	L 27–63	8,031
October 28	6:00 p.m.	Stephen F. Austin	Provost Umphrey Stadium; Beaumont, TX	ESPN3	L 7–34	6,122
November 4	6:00 p.m.	Central Arkansas^{†}	Provost Umphrey Stadium; Beaumont, TX	ESPN3	L 14–42	8,417
November 11	2:00 p.m.	at Houston Baptist	Husky Stadium; Houston, TX	FCS Central	W 23–16	2,311
November 18	6:00 p.m.	No. 19 McNeese State	Provost Umphrey Stadium; Beaumont, TX (Battle of the Border)	ESPN3	L 3–13	5,378
*Non-conference game; ^{†}Homecoming; Rankings from STATS Poll released prior to the game; All times are in Central time

== Game summaries ==
=== At North Texas ===
Lamar at North Texas

Team	1	2	3	4	Total
Cardinals	7	7	0	0	14
• Mean Green	17	21	14	7	59

- Date: September 2
- Location: Apogee Stadium
  Denton, TX
- Game start: 6:00 p.m. CDT
- Elapsed time: 3:05
- Game attendance: 19,592
- Referee: Justin Elliot
- Television network: ESPN3

=== UT Permian Basin ===
UT Permian Basin at Lamar

Team	1	2	3	4	Total
Falcons	6	0	0	0	6
• Cardinals	10	27	14	21	72

- Date: September 9
- Location: Provost Umphrey Stadium
  Beaumont, TX
- Game start: 7:00 pm CDT
- Elapsed time: 3:29
- Game attendance: 7,072
- Game weather: Temp: 83 Wind: 12 mph NE Sunny
- Referee: Vidal Jones
- Television network: ESPN3

=== At Northwestern State ===
Lamar at Northwestern State

Team	1	2	3	4	Total
Cardinals	7	7	7	7	28
• Demons	14	7	7	7	35

- Date: September 15
- Location: Harry Turpin Stadium
  Natchitoches, LA
- Game start: 6:00 pm CDT
- Elapsed time: :
- Game attendance: 11,125
- Game weather: Temp: 88 Wind: 5 mph E Humid and Clear
- Referee: Ross Smith
- Television network: ESPN3

=== At Southeastern Louisiana ===
Lamar at Southeastern Louisiana

Team	1	2	3	4	Total
Cardinals	7	7	7	0	21
• Lions	21	14	7	7	49

- Date: September 23
- Location: Strawberry Stadium
  Hammond, LA
- Game start: 7:00 pm CDT
- Elapsed time: 3:16
- Game attendance: 4,728
- Game weather: Temp: 83 Wind: SSE 5 Fair
- Referee: Vidal Jones
- Television network: Facebook

=== Nicholls State ===
Nicholls State at Lamar

Team	1	2	3	4	Total
• Colonels	6	21	14	0	41
Cardinals	0	7	0	7	14

- Date: September 30
- Location: Provost Umphrey Stadium
  Beaumont, TX
- Game start: 7:00 pm CDT
- Elapsed time: 3:11
- Game attendance: 6,167
- Game weather: Temp: 82 Wind: 6 NNE Clear
- Referee: Michael VanderVelde
- Television network: ESPN3

=== At Incarnate Word ===
Lamar at Incarnate Word

Team	1	2	3	4	Total
Cardinals (LU)	0	10	14	0	24
• Cardinals (UIW)	14	6	7	6	33

- Date: October 14
- Location: Gayle and Tom Benson Stadium
  San Antonio, TX
- Game start: 6:00 pm CDT
- Elapsed time: 3:04
- Game attendance: 5,001
- Game weather: Temp: 90 Wind: 8 mph N Partly cloudy
- Referee: Stephen Baron

=== At Sam Houston State ===
Lamar at Sam Houston State

Team	1	2	3	4	Total
Cardinals	7	13	7	0	27
• No. 7 Bearkats	16	31	10	6	63

- Date: October 21
- Location: Bowers Stadium
  Huntsville, TX
- Game start: 3:05 pm CDT
- Elapsed time: 3:45
- Game attendance: 8,031
- Game weather: Temp: 87 Wind: 7 mph S Sunny
- Referee: Kevin Hassell
- Television network: ESPN3

=== Stephen F. Austin ===
Stephen F. Austin at Lamar

Team	1	2	3	4	Total
• Lumberjacks	7	10	7	10	34
Cardinals	7	0	0	0	7

- Date: October 28
- Location: Provost Umphrey Stadium
  Beaumont, TX
- Game start: 6:00 pm CDT
- Elapsed time: 3:14
- Game attendance: 6,000
- Game weather: Temp: 56 Wind: 9 mph NNW Clear
- Referee: Ross Smith
- Television network: ESPN3

=== Central Arkansas ===
Central Arkansas at Lamar

Team	1	2	3	4	Total
• Bears	14	7	21	0	42
Cardinals	7	0	0	7	14

- Date: November 3
- Location: Provost Umphrey Stadium
  Beaumont, TX
- Game start: 6:00 pm CDT
- Elapsed time: 3:03
- Game attendance: 8,417
- Game weather: Temp: 78 Wind: 8 mph S Partly cloudy
- Television network: ESPN3

=== At Houston Baptist ===
Lamar at Houston Baptist

Team	1	2	3	4	Total
• Cardinals	2	7	0	14	23
Huskies	13	0	3	0	16

- Date: November 11
- Location: Husky Stadium
  Houston, TX
- Game start: 2:00 pm CST
- Elapsed time: 3:10
- Game attendance: 2,311
- Game weather: Temp: 78 Wind: 9 mph ESE
- Referee: C. Watson
- Television network: FCS Central

=== McNeese State ===
McNeese State at Lamar

Team	1	2	3	4	Total
• No. 19 Cowboys	0	10	3	0	13
Cardinals	0	0	0	3	3

- Date: November 17
- Location: Provost Umphrey Stadium
  Beaumont, TX
- Game start: 7:00 pm CST
- Elapsed time: 3:16
- Game attendance: 5,378
- Game weather: Temp: 66 Wind: 17 mph NW Partly cloudy
- Referee: Kevin Hassell
- Television network: Eleven
