= Mike Schultz (American football) =

American football coach (born 1958)

Current position
- Title: Senior offensive assistant
- Team: UT Rio Grande Valley
- Conference: SLC

Biographical details
- Born: January 3, 1958 (age 68); Houston, Texas, U.S.
- Education: Sam Houston State (1979)

Coaching career (HC unless noted)
- 1979–1980: Sam Houston (QB/RB)
- 1981: UTEP (WR/TE)
- 1982: Kansas State (RB)
- 1983–1984: Tennessee Tech (RB/DB)
- 1985: Texas (LB)
- 1986–1989: Westwood HS (TX) (assistant/DC)
- 1990–1991: Southwest Texas State (RB/DB)
- 1992–1997: New Mexico (RB/DB)
- 1998–2000: TCU (RGC)
- 2001–2008: TCU (OC)
- 2009: Illinois (OC)
- 2010: Middle Tennessee (OC)
- 2011–2015: Texas State (OC)
- 2017–2019: Lamar
- 2023–present: UT Rio Grande Valley (senior off. assist.)

Head coaching record
- Overall: 13–22
- Tournaments: 0–1 (FCS Playoffs)

Mike Schultz (born January 3, 1958) is an American college football coach. He is a senior offensive assistant at University of Texas Rio Grande Valley (UTRGV), a position he had held since the inception of the program in 2023. Hired on December 21, 2016, to replace Ray Woodard, Schultz was the second head coach of the Lamar Cardinals football program since its resurrection for the 2010 season.

Schultz graduated from Sam Houston State University in 1979, after which he worked as a quarterbacks and running backs coach at the university. After spending the next two decades in several other assistant coaching positions, Schultz became the offensive coordinator at TCU in 2000, a post he held through the 2008 season. He then served as the OC at Illinois and Middle Tennessee for the 2009 and 2010 seasons, respectively, before moving back to Texas to hold the same position at Texas State under returning head coach Dennis Franchione from 2011 to 2015. The 2017 season at Lamar was Schultz's first as head coach.

== Coaching career ==
=== Early coaching career ===
Schultz held numerous assistant coaching positions after his graduation from Sam Houston in 1979, starting as a recruiting coordinator and linebackers coach at the university that season before switching to quarterbacks and receivers the next. In his next two positions, at UTEP and Kansas State, he also served as a recruiting coordinator, as well as a receivers and tight ends coach. After two seasons as a running backs and secondary coach at Tennessee Tech and a year under Fred Akers at Texas, Schultz spent the next four years at Westwood High School in Round Rock, Texas as an assistant and defensive coordinator.

Schultz returned to collegiate coaching in 1990, working under Dennis "Coach Fran" Franchione at then-Southland Conference member Southwest Texas State (now Texas State) for two seasons as a running backs and secondary coach, then moving to the University of New Mexico to hold the same position from 1992-1997 when Franchione was hired as head coach there. During Schultz's tenure at UNM, the Lobos earned the WAC Mountain Division Championship and an invitation to the 1997 Insight.com Bowl, the Lobos' first bowl appearance in nearly four decades. After that season, "Coach Fran" was hired at Texas Christian, and Schultz returned to Texas to serve as TCU's running game coordinator. The Horned Frogs went 7–5 for the 1998 season, just a year after producing a 1–11 record, and earned a berth into the Sun Bowl in which they produced 314 rushing yards and defeated the USC Trojans 28-19. TCU earned conference co-champion honors for both the 1998 and 1999 seasons.

=== Offensive coordinator ===
==== TCU ====
When Franchione was hired as the head coach at Alabama for the 2001 season, TCU's defensive coordinator Gary Patterson took the reins as head coach (a position he held until near the end of the 2021 season), and Mike Schultz was promoted to offensive coordinator. The Horned Frogs continued their improvement, and ended the 2002, 2003, 2005, 2006, and 2008 seasons ranked in the Top 25 by both the AP and Coaches' polls. Schultz's dominant offenses set several school records, and the Horned Frogs consistently ranked high nationally in terms of offensive production. On the backbone of the offensive power cultivated by Schultz, TCU switched conferences three times during head coach Patterson's tenure, moving from the WAC to Conference USA in 2001, joining the Mountain West Conference in 2005 and winning championship honors, and finally switching to the Big 12 in 2012.

In addition to constructing a commanding offensive foundation, Schultz was also important in the development of standout players at TCU. Under Schultz's tutelage, running back LaDainian Tomlinson had his two best seasons as a Horned Frog, setting the FBS single-game record with 406 rushing yards against UTEP in 1999 and leading the NCAA with 1,850 yards in 1999 and 2,158 in 2000. Tomlinson's total of 5,263 rushing yards is a TCU record, and he won the Doak Walker Award his senior season in addition to being a Heisman Trophy finalist. After leaving the university, Tomlinson was picked fifth overall in the NFL draft, and he was later honored as the NFL's Most Valuable Player in 2006, having accrued 1,815 rushing yards and a record 28 touchdowns that season. Counting Tomlinson's two seasons separately, Schultz presided over an unprecedented five 1,000-yard rushers at TCU, more than doubling the number the school saw in its entire football history. Several years later, Schultz again demonstrated his ability to develop young players when working with future NFL star Andy Dalton. A redshirt freshman, Dalton was named the Horned Frogs' starting quarterback prior to the 2007 season, and went on to throw 10 touchdowns that season and 11 the next, amassing over 2,200 yards each year on near-60% completion ratios. Even after Schultz left, Dalton continued his success, and he went on to throw for over 3,000 yards in each of his first three NFL seasons.

==== Illinois ====
After his departure from TCU, Schultz took the offensive coordinator position at Illinois for the 2009 season. Despite high preseason expectations, the Illini failed to produce much success with their option/spread offensive scheme, and they finished the season 3-9, the fourth losing season during then-head coach Ron Zook's tenure.

==== Middle Tennessee ====
Mike Schultz joined the staff at Middle Tennessee as offensive coordinator for the 2010 season, running a spread offense which had moderately more success than his previous team. The Blue Raiders finished the season 6-7 overall, but 5-3 in Sun Belt Conference play, and the team was invited to the 2011 GoDaddy.com Bowl where they were defeated by the Miami Redhawks.

==== Texas State ====
Schultz returned to Texas State University with former head coach Dennis Franchione in 2011, when the university was transitioning from FCS to FBS classification. Schultz rejoined the staff at Texas State as the offensive coordinator, and he helped the Bobcats post a 6–6 record, including a 46–21 win against his future team, the Lamar Cardinals. For 2012, the Bobcats' first year in the FBS and only year as members of the WAC, the Bobcats finished 4–8, 2-4 in conference play. Texas State moved to the Sun Belt Conference in the following year and posted a 6–6 overall record. The 2014 season was the program's best under Schultz's tenure, and the Bobcats finished the season 7–5 overall with a 5–3 conference record to cement a three-way tie for fourth place. Although eligible, they were not selected to participate in a bowl game; the Bobcats were the only eligible 7–5 FBS team not to receive a bowl bid.

=== Head coach ===
==== Lamar ====
Schultz was hired by Lamar University on December 21, 2016, to replace former head coach Ray Woodard. During the 2017 season, Schultz's first as head coach, the Cardinals won two of their 11 games with a 1–8 Southland Conference record. Schultz was fired at the conclusion of the 2019 season, in which the Cardinals finished 4–8.

== Head coaching record ==
| Year | Team | Overall | Conference | Standing | Bowl/playoffs |
|---|---|---|---|---|---|
Lamar Cardinals (Southland Conference) (2017–2019)
| 2017 | Lamar | 2–9 | 1–8 | 10th | |
| 2018 | Lamar | 7–5 | 6–3 | 3rd | L FCS Playoffs First Round |
| 2019 | Lamar | 4–8 | 2–7 | 11th | |
| Lamar: | | 13–22 | 9–18 | | |
| Total: | | 13–22 | | | |
