= 2017 Sam Houston State Bearkats football team =

American college football season

2017 Sam Houston State Bearkats football

FCS Playoffs Semifinals, L 13–55 vs. North Dakota State
- Conference: Southland Conference

Ranking
- STATS: No. 4
- FCS Coaches: No. 3
- Record: 12–2 (8–1 Southland)
- Head coach: K. C. Keeler (4th season)
- Offensive coordinator: Tim Cramsey (1st season)
- Offensive scheme: Pro spread
- Defensive coordinator: Clayton Carlin (1st season)
- Base defense: 4–2–5
- Home stadium: Bowers Stadium

2017 Southland Conference football standings
	Conf.			Overall
Team	W		L	W		L
No. 10 Central Arkansas $^	9	–	0	10	–	2
No. 4 Sam Houston State ^	8	–	1	12	–	2
No. 25 Nicholls State ^	7	–	2	8	–	4
No. 22 McNeese State	7	–	2	9	–	2
Southeastern Louisiana	6	–	3	6	–	5
Northwestern State	4	–	5	4	–	7
Stephen F. Austin	4	–	5	4	–	7
Abilene Christian	2	–	7	2	–	9
Incarnate Word	1	–	7	1	–	10
Lamar	1	–	8	2	–	9
Houston Baptist	0	–	9	1	–	10
$ – Conference champion; ^ – FCS playoff participant; Rankings from STATS poll

The 2017 Sam Houston State Bearkats football team represented Sam Houston State University in the 2017 NCAA Division I FCS football season. The Bearkats were led by fourth-year head coach K. C. Keeler and played their home games at Bowers Stadium. They were a member of the Southland Conference. They finished the season 12–2, 8–1 in Southland play to finish in second place. They received an at-large bid to the FCS playoffs where they defeated South Dakota in the first round and Kennesaw State in the quarterfinals before losing in the semifinals to North Dakota State.

== Schedule ==
Date	Time	Opponent	Rank	Site	TV	Result	Attendance
September 1 (Note: Game was originally scheduled for August 27, but postponed and relocated due to Hurricane Harvey.)	6:00 p.m.	No. 7 Richmond*	No. 3	McLane Stadium; Waco, TX	ESPN3	W 48–34	8,048
September 7	6:30 p.m.	at Prairie View A&M*	No. 3	Panther Stadium at Blackshear Field; Prairie View, TX	ESPNU	W 44–31	8,465
September 23	6:00 p.m.	Nicholls State	No. 3	Bowers Stadium; Huntsville, TX	ESPN3	W 66–17	12,863
September 30	6:00 p.m.	at No. 11 Central Arkansas	No. 3	Estes Stadium; Conway, AR	ESPN3	L 30–41	11,347
October 7	1:00 p.m.	vs. Stephen F. Austin	No. 9	NRG Stadium; Houston, TX (Battle of the Piney Woods)	ESPN3	W 27–16	26,792
October 14	3:45 p.m.	Northwestern State	No. 9	Bowers Stadium; Huntsville, TX	ELVN	W 40–36	5,229
October 21	3:00 p.m.	Lamar^{†}	No. 7	Bowers Stadium; Huntsville, TX	ESPN3	W 63–27	8,031
October 28	7:00 p.m.	at Southeastern Louisiana	No. 5	Strawberry Stadium; Hammond, LA	ESPN3	W 33–23	6,027
November 4	1:00 p.m.	Incarnate Word	No. 5	Bowers Stadium; Huntsville, TX	ESPN3	W 57–20	5,077
November 11	6:00 p.m.	at Abilene Christian	No. 4	Wildcat Stadium; Abilene, TX	ESPN3	W 44–35	5,995
November 18	1:00 p.m.	Houston Baptist	No. 5	Bowers Stadium; Huntsville, TX	ESPN3	W 53–33	6,515
December 2	2:00 p.m.	No. 16 South Dakota*	No. 5	Bowers Stadium; Huntsville, TX (NCAA Division I Second Round)	ESPN3	W 54–42	4,401
December 9	7:30 p.m.	No. 18 Kennesaw State*	No. 5	Bowers Stadium; Huntsville, TX (NCAA Division I Quarterfinal)	ESPN3	W 34–27	5,725
December 15	7:00 p.m.	at No. 4 North Dakota State*	No. 5	Fargodome; Fargo, ND (NCAA Division I Semifinal)	ESPN2	L 13–55	18,279
*Non-conference game; ^{†}Homecoming; Rankings from STATS Poll released prior to the game; All times are in Central time

== Game summaries ==
=== Richmond ===
Richmond at Sam Houston State

Team	1	2	3	4	Total
No. 7 Spiders	6	14	7	7	34
• No. 3 Bearkats	6	35	7	0	48

- Date: September 1
- Location: McLane Stadium
  Waco, TX
- Game start: 6:00 p.m. CDT
- Elapsed time: 3:50
- Game attendance: 8,048
- Game weather: 90 °F (32 °C) • S 5–10 mph (8.0–16.1 km/h) • Fair skies
- Referee: Dan Romeo
- TV announcers (ESPN3): Play-By-Play: Mike Couzens Analysis: John Congemi

=== @ Prairie View A&M ===
Sam Houston State at Prairie View A&M

Team	1	2	3	4	Total
• No. 3 Bearkats	17	13	7	7	44
Panthers	3	14	7	7	31

- Date: September 7
- Location: Panther Stadium at Blackshear Field
  Prairie View, TX
- Game start: 6:30 p.m. CDT
- Elapsed time: 3:29
- Game attendance: 8,468
- Game weather: 82 °F (28 °C) • Sunny
- Referee: Eddie Kelley
- TV announcers (ESPNU): Play-By-Play: Eric Clemons Analysis: Jay Walker

=== Nicholls ===
Nicholls at Sam Houston State

Team	1	2	3	4	Total
Colonels	0	3	0	14	17
• No. 3 Bearkats	14	24	21	7	66

- Date: September 23
- Location: Bowers Stadium
  Huntsville, TX
- Game start: 6:00 p.m. CDT
- Elapsed time: 3:30
- Game attendance: 12,863
- Game weather: 84 °F (29 °C) • S 5–10 mph (8.0–16.1 km/h) Calm • Clear and sunny
- Referee: Dan Lewis
- TV announcers (ESPN3): Play-By-Play: Randy McIlvoy • Analysis: Shea Walker

=== @ Central Arkansas ===
Sam Houston State at Central Arkansas

Team	1	2	3	4	Total
No. 3 Bearkats	7	10	7	6	30
• No. 11 Bears	14	17	3	7	41

- Date: September 30
- Location: Estes Stadium
  Conway, AR
- Game start: 6:00 p.m. CDT
- Elapsed time: 3:44
- Game attendance: 11,347
- Referee: Brandon Cruise
- TV announcers (ESPN3): Play-By-Play: Randy McIlvoy • Analysis: Shea Walker • Sideline: Tatum Everett

=== Vs. Stephen F. Austin ===
Battle of the Piney Woods

Team	1	2	3	4	Total
Lumberjacks	0	13	0	3	16
• No. 9 Bearkats	17	3	0	7	27

- Date: October 7
- Location: NRG Stadium
  Houston, TX
- Game start: 1:00 p.m. CDT
- Elapsed time: 3:37
- Game attendance: 26,792
- Game weather: Indoors
- Referee: Ross Smith
- TV announcers (ESPN3): Play-By-Play: Randy McIlvoy • Analysis: Shea Walker • Sideline: Tatum Everett

=== Northwestern State ===
Northwestern State at Sam Houston State

Team	1	2	3	4	Total
Demons	17	10	9	0	36
• No. 9 Bearkats	7	14	7	12	40

- Date: October 14
- Location: Bowers Stadium
  Huntsville, TX
- Game start: 3:45 p.m. CDT
- Game attendance: 5,229
- Television network: ELVN

=== Lamar ===
Lamar at Sam Houston State (homecoming)

Team	1	2	3	4	Total
Cardinals	7	13	7	0	27
• No. 7 Bearkats	16	31	10	6	63

- Date: October 21
- Location: Bowers Stadium
  Huntsville, TX
- Game start: 3:00 p.m. CDT
- Game attendance: 8,031
- Television network: ESPN3

=== @ Southeastern Louisiana ===
Sam Houston State at Southeastern Louisiana

Team	1	2	3	4	Total
• No. 5 Bearkats	9	7	10	7	33
Lions	3	13	7	0	23

- Date: October 28
- Location: Strawberry Stadium
  Hammond, LA
- Game start: 7:00 p.m. CDT
- Game attendance: 6,027
- Television network: ESPN3

Scoring summary
1	–
2	–
3	–
4	–

=== Incarnate Word ===
Incarnate Word at Sam Houston State

Team	1	2	3	4	Total
Cardinals	7	7	0	6	20
• No. 5 Bearkats	23	13	21	0	57

- Date: November 4
- Location: Bowers Stadium
  Huntsville, TX
- Game start: 1:00 p.m. CST
- Game attendance: 5,077

Scoring summary
1	–
2	–
3	–
4	–

=== @ Abilene Christian ===
Sam Houston State at Abilene Christian

Team	1	2	3	4	Total
• No. 4 Bearkats	24	0	7	13	44
Demons	0	7	14	14	35

- Date: November 11
- Location: Anthony Field at Wildcat Stadium
  Abilene, TX
- Game start: 6:00 p.m. CST
- Game attendance: 5,995

Scoring summary
1	–
2	–
3	–
4	–

=== Houston Baptist ===
Houston Baptist at Sam Houston State

Team	1	2	3	4	Total
Huskies	7	7	7	12	33
• No. 5 Bearkats	26	7	13	7	53

- Date: November 18
- Location: Bowers Stadium
  Huntsville, TX
- Game start: 1:00 p.m. CST
- Game attendance: 6,515

Scoring summary
1	–
2	–
3	–
4	–

== FCS Playoffs ==
=== South Dakota–Second Round ===
FCS Playoffs Second Round

Team	1	2	3	4	Total
No. 16 Coyotes	7	7	14	14	42
• No. 5 Bearkats	14	27	0	13	54

- Date: December 2
- Location: Bowers Stadium
  Huntsville, TX
- Game start: 2:00 p.m. CST
- Game attendance: 4,401

Scoring summary
1	–
2	–
3	–
4	–

=== Kennesaw State–Quarterfinals ===
FCS Playoffs Quarterfinals

Team	1	2	3	4	Total
No. 18 Owls	7	3	3	14	27
• No. 5 Bearkats	14	10	3	7	34

- Date: December 9
- Location: Bowers Stadium
  Huntsville, TX
- Game start: 7:30 p.m. CST
- Game attendance: 5,725
- Television network: ESPN3

Scoring summary
1	–
2	–
3	–
4	–

=== @ North Dakota State–Semifinals ===
FCS Playoffs Semifinals

Team	1	2	3	4	Total
No. 5 Bearkats	3	0	10	0	13
• No. 4 Bison	21	20	14	0	55

- Date: December 15
- Location: Fargodome
  Fargo, ND
- Game start: 7:00 p.m. CST
- Game attendance: 18,279
- Television network: ESPN2

Scoring summary
1	–
2	–
3	–
4	–

== Ranking movements ==
Ranking movements Legend: ██ Increase in ranking ██ Decrease in ranking ( ) = First-place votes
	Week													
Poll	Pre	1	2	3	4	5	6	7	8	9	10	11	12	Final
STATS FCS	3 (7)	3 (2)	3	3 (1)	3 (2)	9	9	7	5	5	4	5	5	4
Coaches	3 (3)	3 (1)	3	3	3	11	9	7	5	5	4	4	5	3
