= 2011 GoDaddy.com Bowl =

Middle Tennessee Blue Raiders	Miami RedHawks
(6–6)	(9–4)
Sun Belt	MAC
21	35
Head coach: Rick Stockstill	Head coach: Lance Guidry
	1	2	3	4	Total
Middle Tennessee	14	0	7	0	21
Miami	7	7	14	7	35
- Date: January 6, 2011
- Season: 2010
- Stadium: Ladd–Peebles Stadium
- Location: Mobile, Alabama
- Favorite: Miami by 1
- Referee: Marc Curles (Southeastern Conference)
- Attendance: 38,168
- Payout: US$750,000 per team

United States TV coverage
- Network: ESPN
- Announcers: Carter Blackburn, Brock Huard and Mike Bellotti

The 2011 GoDaddy.com Bowl, the twelfth edition of the college football bowl game, was played at Ladd–Peebles Stadium in Mobile, Alabama on January 6, 2011. The game was telecast on ESPN and matched Miami from the MAC versus Middle Tennessee from the Sun Belt. Previously, the bowl game was known as the GMAC Bowl.

== Teams ==
=== Middle Tennessee ===
This was Middle Tennessee's first bowl appearance in the GoDaddy.com Bowl. Entering the game, offense leaders for the Blue Raiders were RB Phillip Tanner (149 att., 841 yds. rushing, 11 TDs), QB Dwight Dasher (127 of 222 passes, 1,388 yards, 6 TDs) and WR Malcolm Beyah (27 rec., 364 yds., 2 TDs). Defensively, the team was led by DB Jeremy Kellem (101 tackles, 1.5 tfl, 2 INT), DE Jamari Lattimore (64 tackles, 14.5 tfl, 11.0 sacks) and LB Darin Davis (73 tackles, 8.0 tfl, 3.5 sacks, 3 interceptions).

=== Miami ===
This was Miami's second appearance in this bowl game; they played in the 2003 edition when it was under the name GMAC Bowl. Miami was one of the most improved program in the country, capped a dramatic turnaround season by winning the 2010 marathon MAC Football Championship. The RedHawks defeated Northern Illinois, 26–21, with a touchdown with 33 seconds left in regulation. Miami clinched the East Division with a 23–3 win over Temple on November 23.

== Game summary ==
=== Scoring summary ===
Scoring play	Score
1st quarter
MT – Phillip Tanner 18-yard run (Alan Gendreau kick), 4:37	MT 7–0
Miami – Thomas Merriweather 3-yard run (Trevor Cook kick), 2:29	TIE 7–7
MT – Dwight Dasher 51-yard run (Gendreau kick), 0:40	MT 14–7
2nd quarter
Miami – Thomas Merriweather 3-yard run (Trevor Cook Kick), 13:11	TIE 14–14
3rd quarter
Miami – Dayonne Nunley 52-yard interception return (Trevor Cook Kick), 13:22	Miami 21–14
MT – Phillip Tanner 54-yard run (Alan Gendreau Kick), 12:32	TIE 21–21
Miami – Chris Givens 17-yard pass from Austin Boucher (Trevor Cook Kick), 00:54	Miami 28–21
4th quarter
Miami – Nick Harwell 5-yard pass from Austin Boucher (Trevor Cook Kick), 5:25	Miami 35–21

=== Statistics ===
Statistics	Middle Tennessee	Miami
First downs	15	22
Total offense, plays - yards	61–372	78–431
Rushes-yards (net)	32–211	40–134
Passing yards (net)	161	297
Passes, Comp-Att-Int	18–29–4	23–38–2
Time of Possession	21:02	38:58

== Notes ==
- This was the first meeting between these two teams.
- Miami became the first FBS team ever to follow a 10-loss season with a 10-win season; the RedHawks went 1–11 the previous season. However, this was not the biggest turnaround in FBS history as measured by games. The FBS record turnaround by that measure remains the 8 1/2-game turnaround by Hawaiʻi from 0–12 in 1999 to 9–4 in 2000. Miami's turnaround from 1–11 to 10–4 amounted to an 8-game turnaround.
