= 2017 Big South Conference football season =

- League: NCAA Division I FCS
- Sport: Football
- Duration: Begins August 31, 2017
- Teams: 6

Big South Conference football seasons
- ← 2016 2018

2017 Big South Conference football standings
	Conf.			Overall
Team	W		L	W		L
No. 8 Kennesaw State $^	5	–	0	12	–	2
Monmouth ^	4	–	1	9	–	3
Charleston Southern	3	–	2	6	–	5
Liberty *	2	–	3	6	–	5
Presbyterian	1	–	4	4	–	7
Gardner–Webb	0	–	5	1	–	10
$ – Conference champion; ^ – FCS playoff participant; * Liberty ineligible for postseason due to FBS transition; Rankings from STATS Poll

The 2017 Big South Conference football season began on Thursday, August 31 and concluded n December with the 2018 NCAA Division I Football Championship.

== Head coaches ==
Team	Head Coach
Charleston Southern	Mark Tucker
Gardner–Webb	Carroll McCray
Kennesaw State	Brian Bohannon
Liberty	Turner Gill
Presbyterian	Tommy Spangler
Monmouth	Kevin Callahan

== Rankings ==
Legend
Increase in ranking
Decrease in ranking
Not ranked previous week

		Pre	Wk 1	Wk 2	Wk 3	Wk 4	Wk 5	Wk 6	Wk 7	Wk 8	Wk 9	Wk 10	Wk 11	Wk 12	Final
Charleston Southern	STATS	14	16	16	RV	RV	RV	RV	RV	RV	RV	RV	–	–	–
Charleston Southern	C	14	18	19	RV	RV	RV	–	–	–	–	–	–	–	–
Gardner–Webb	STATS	–	–	–	–	–	–	–	–	–	–	–	–	–	–
Gardner–Webb	C	–	–	–	–	–	–	–	–	–	–	–	–	–	–
Kennesaw State	STATS	RV	RV	RV	RV	RV	RV	RV	RV	RV	25	23	22	18	8
Kennesaw State	C	RV	–	RV	RV	RV	RV	RV	RV	RV	25	23	21	16	9
Liberty	STATS	RV	20	19	16	22	RV	RV	RV	–	–	–	–	–	–
Liberty	C	–	–	–	–	–	–	–	–	–	–	–	–	–	–
Monmouth	STATS	–	–	RV	RV	RV	RV	RV	RV	RV	RV	RV	RV	RV	RV
Monmouth	C	–	–	–	–	RV	RV	RV	RV	RV	24	22	22	23	RV
Presbyterian	STATS	–	–	–	–	–	–	–	–	–	–	–	–	–	–
Presbyterian	C	–	–	–	–	–	–	–	–	–	–	–	–	–	–

== Regular season ==
Index to colors and formatting
Big South member won
Big South member lost
Big South teams in **bold**

All times Eastern time (UTC-4 before November 5, UTC-5 from November 5 forward).

=== Week One ===
Date	Time	Visiting team	Home team	Site	Result	Attendance	Reference
Aug. 31	6:30 PM	**Presbyterian**	Wake Forest	BB&T Field • Winston-Salem, NC	**L** 7–51	22,643	
Aug. 31	7:00 PM	**Kennesaw State**	Samford	Seibert Stadium • Homewood, AL	**L** 23–28	4,908	
Sep. 2	3:00 PM	Lafayette	**Monmouth**	Kessler Field • West Long Branch, NJ	**W** 31–12	3,898	
Sep. 2	4:00 PM	**Charleston Southern**	Mississippi State	Davis Wade Stadium • Starkville, MS	**L** 0–49	54,215	
Sep. 2	6:00 PM	North Carolina A&T	**Gardner–Webb**	Ernest W. Spangler Stadium • Boiling Springs, NC	**L** 3–45	7,015	
Sep. 2	7:00 PM	**Liberty**	Baylor	McLane Stadium • Waco, TX	**W** 48–45	45,784	

=== Week Two ===
Date	Time	Visiting team	Home team	Site	Result	Attendance	Reference
Sep. 9	12:00 PM (Note: The game between Presbyterian and The Citadel was originally scheduled to take place at The Citadel, at 6:00 PM, but was rescheduled in advance of the arrival of Hurricane Irma.)	The Citadel	**Presbyterian**	Bailey Memorial Stadium • Clinton, SC	**L** 7–48	2,586	
Sep. 9	1:00 PM	Lehigh	**Monmouth**	Kessler Field • West Long Branch, NJ	**W** 46–27	2,839	
Sep. 9	4:00 PM	**Gardner–Webb**	Wyoming	War Memorial Stadium • Laramie, WY	**L** 0–27	19,051	
Sep. 9	6:00 PM	**Charleston Southern**	South Carolina State	Oliver C. Dawson Stadium • Orangeburg, SC	**Postponed** (Note: The game between South Carolina State and Charleston Southern was postponed in advance of the arrival of Hurricane Irma.)		—
Sep. 9	6:00 PM	Morehead State	**Liberty**	Williams Stadium • Lynchburg, VA	**W** 58–17	17,118	
Sep. 9	7:00 PM	Tennessee Tech	**Kennesaw State**	Fifth Third Bank Stadium • Kennesaw, GA	**W** 27–14	8,418	

=== Week Three ===
Date	Time	Visiting team	Home team	Site	Result	Attendance	Reference
Sep. 16	6:00 PM	**Charleston Southern**	Elon	Rhodes Stadium • Elon, NC	**L** 17–19	5,248	
Sep. 16	6:00 PM	Western Carolina	**Gardner–Webb**	Ernest W. Spangler Stadium • Boiling Springs, NC	**L** 27–42	6,152	
Sep. 16	6:00 PM	Indiana State	**Liberty**	Williams Stadium • Lynchburg, VA	**W** 42–41	16,060	
Sep. 16	7:00 PM	**Monmouth**	Albany	Bob Ford Field • Albany, NY	**L** 14–28	6,384	
Sep. 16	7:00 PM	Campbell	**Presbyterian**	Bailey Memorial Stadium • Clinton, SC	**W** 28–16	2,204	
Sep. 16	8:00 PM	**Kennesaw State**	Alabama State	New ASU Stadium • Montgomery, AL	**W** 20–14	11,000	

=== Week Four ===
Date	Time	Visiting team	Home team	Site	Result	Attendance	Reference
Sep. 23	1:30 PM	**Gardner–Webb**	Wofford	Gibbs Stadium • Spartanburg, SC	**L** 24–27	7,211	
Sep. 23	2:00 PM	**Monmouth**	Hampton	Armstrong Stadium • Hampton, VA	**W** 30–23 ^{OT}	5,123	
Sep. 23	6:00 PM	Point	**Charleston Southern**	Buccaneer Field • North Charleston, SC	**W** 66–0	1,945	
Sep. 23	7:00 PM	**Liberty**	Jacksonville State	JSU Stadium • Jacksonville, AL	**L** 10–31	23,944	
Sep. 23	7:00 PM	Cumberland	**Presbyterian**	Bailey Memorial Stadium • Clinton, SC	**W** 27–20	2,140	

=== Week Five ===
Date	Time	Visiting team	Home team	Site	Result	Attendance	Reference
Sep. 30	3:30 PM	North Greenville	**Kennesaw State**	Fifth Third Bank Stadium • Kennesaw, GA	**W** 38–34	6,161	
Sep. 30	6:00 PM	Mississippi Valley State	**Charleston Southern**	Buccaneer Field • North Charleston, SC	**W** 58–7	1,456	
Sep. 30	6:00 PM	Saint Francis	**Liberty**	Williams Stadium • Lynchburg, VA	**L** 7–13	15,886	
Sep. 30	6:00 PM	**Monmouth**	Bucknell	Christy Mathewson–Memorial Stadium • Lewisburg, PA	**W** 35–13	1,942	
Sep. 30	7:00 PM	Wofford	**Presbyterian**	Bailey Memorial Stadium • Clinton, SC	**L** 7–31	2,862	

=== Week Six ===
Date	Time	Visiting team	Home team	Site	Result	Attendance	Reference
Oct. 7	1:05 PM	**Monmouth**	Holy Cross	Fitton Field • Worcester, MA			—
Oct. 7	1:30 PM	Shorter	**Gardner–Webb**	Ernest W. Spangler Stadium • Boiling Springs, NC			—
Oct. 7	2:00 PM	Saint Francis	**Presbyterian**	Bailey Memorial Stadium • Clinton, SC			—
Oct. 7	7:00 PM	Texas Southern	**Kennesaw State**	Fifth Third Bank Stadium • Kennesaw, GA			—

=== Week Seven ===
Date	Time	Visiting team	Home team	Site	Result	Attendance	Reference
Oct. 14	12:00 PM	**Charleston Southern**	**Presbyterian**	Bailey Memorial Stadium • Clinton, SC			—
Oct. 14	2:00 PM	**Gardner–Webb**	North Carolina Central	O'Kelly–Riddick Stadium • Durham, NC			—
Oct. 14	6:00 PM	**Kennesaw State**	**Liberty**	Williams Stadium • Lynchburg, VA			—

=== Week Eight ===
Date	Time	Visiting team	Home team	Site	Result	Attendance	Reference
Oct. 21	1:00 PM	**Liberty**	**Monmouth**	Kessler Field • West Long Branch, NJ			—
Oct. 21	6:00 PM	Savannah State	**Charleston Southern**	Buccaneer Field • North Charleston, SC			—
Oct. 21	7:00 PM	**Gardner–Webb**	**Kennesaw State**	Fifth Third Bank Stadium • Kennesaw, GA			—

=== Week Nine ===
Date	Time	Visiting team	Home team	Site	Result	Attendance	Reference
Oct. 28	12:00 PM	**Liberty**	**Gardner–Webb**	Ernest W. Spangler Stadium • Boiling Springs, NC			—
Oct. 28	2:00 PM	**Kennesaw State**	**Presbyterian**	Bailey Memorial Stadium • Clinton, SC			—
Oct. 28	6:00 PM	**Monmouth**	**Charleston Southern**	Buccaneer Field • North Charleston, SC			—

=== Week Ten ===
Date	Time	Visiting team	Home team	Site	Result	Attendance	Reference
Nov. 4	1:00 PM	**Presbyterian**	**Monmouth**	Kessler Field • West Long Branch, NJ			—
Nov. 4	1:30 PM	**Charleston Southern**	**Gardner–Webb**	Ernest W. Spangler Stadium • Boiling Springs, NC			—
Nov. 4	2:00 PM	**Kennesaw State**	Montana State	Bobcat Stadium • Bozeman, MT			—
Nov. 4	3:30 PM	Duquesne	**Liberty**	Williams Stadium • Lynchburg, VA			—

=== Week Eleven ===
Date	Time	Visiting team	Home team	Site	Result	Attendance	Reference
Nov. 11	12:00 PM	**Gardner–Webb**	**Monmouth**	Kessler Field • West Long Branch, NJ			—
Nov. 11	3:30 PM	**Charleston Southern**	**Kennesaw State**	Fifth Third Bank Stadium • Kennesaw, GA			—
Nov. 11	3:30 PM	**Presbyterian**	**Liberty**	Williams Stadium • Lynchburg, VA			—

=== Week Twelve ===
Date	Time	Visiting team	Home team	Site	Result	Attendance	Reference
Nov. 18	TBA	**Monmouth**	**Kennesaw State**	Fifth Third Bank Stadium • Kennesaw, GA			—
Nov. 18	12:00 PM	**Liberty**	**Charleston Southern**	Buccaneer Field • North Charleston, SC			—
Nov. 18	1:00 PM	**Gardner–Webb**	**Presbyterian**	Bailey Memorial Stadium • Clinton, SC			—

== Attendance ==
Team	Stadium	Capacity	Game 1	Game 2	Game 3	Game 4	Game 5	Game 6	Game 7	Game 8	Total	Average	% of Capacity
Charleston Southern	Buccaneer Field	4,000	1,945	1,456							3,401	1,701	42.5%
Gardner–Webb	Ernest W. Spangler Stadium	9,000	7,015	6,152							13,167	6,584	43.9%
Kennesaw State	Fifth Third Bank Stadium	9,000	8,418	6,161							14,579	7,290	80.9%
Liberty	Williams Stadium	19,200	17,118	16,060	15,886						49,064	16,355	85.2%
Presbyterian	Bailey Memorial Stadium	6,500	2,596	2,204	2,140	2,862					9,802	2,451	37.7%
Monmouth	Kessler Field	3,200	3,898	2,839							6,737	3,369	105.3%
