= 2017 Kennesaw State Owls football team =

American college football season

2017 Kennesaw State Owls football

Big South champion

FCS Playoffs Quarterfinals, L 27–34 vs. Sam Houston State
- Conference: Big South Conference

Ranking
- STATS: No. 8
- FCS Coaches: No. 9
- Record: 12–2 (5–0 Big South)
- Head coach: Brian Bohannon (3rd season)
- Offensive coordinator: Grant Chesnut (3rd season)
- Offensive scheme: Flexbone option
- Defensive coordinator: Brian Newberry (3rd season)
- Base defense: 4–2–5
- Home stadium: Fifth Third Bank Stadium

2017 Big South Conference football standings
	Conf.			Overall
Team	W		L	W		L
No. 8 Kennesaw State $^	5	–	0	12	–	2
Monmouth ^	4	–	1	9	–	3
Charleston Southern	3	–	2	6	–	5
Liberty *	2	–	3	6	–	5
Presbyterian	1	–	4	4	–	7
Gardner–Webb	0	–	5	1	–	10
$ – Conference champion; ^ – FCS playoff participant; * Liberty ineligible for postseason due to FBS transition; Rankings from STATS Poll

The 2017 Kennesaw State Owls football team represented Kennesaw State University in the 2017 NCAA Division I FCS football season. They were led by third-year head coach Brian Bohannon and played their home games at Fifth Third Bank Stadium in Kennesaw, Georgia as third-year members of the Big South Conference. They finished the season 12–2, 5–0 in Big South play to win the Big South conference championship. The Owls received the Big South's automatic bid to the FCS Playoffs, their first trip to the playoffs in school history. In the first round of the playoffs, the Owls defeated Samford in a rematch of their only regular season loss and marked the school's first ever playoff win. In the second round, the Owls upset No. 3 seed Jacksonville State to advance to the quarterfinals. In the quarterfinals, despite a furious second half comeback, they lost to Sam Houston State.

On January 9, 2018, head coach Brian Bohannon was named the American Football Coaches Association's Coach of the Year.

== Schedule ==
Date	Time	Opponent	Rank	Site	TV	Result	Attendance
August 31	7:00 p.m.	at No. 19 Samford*		Seibert Stadium; Homewood, AL	ESPN3; WPCH	L 23–28	4,908
September 9	7:00 p.m.	Tennessee Tech*		Fifth Third Bank Stadium; Kennesaw, GA	BSN; WPCH	W 27–14	8,418
September 16	8:00 p.m.	at Alabama State*		New ASU Stadium; Montgomery, AL	ASAA	W 20–14	11,000
September 30	3:30 p.m.	North Greenville*		Fifth Third Bank Stadium; Kennesaw, GA	WPCH	W 38–34	6,161
October 7	7:00 p.m.	Texas Southern*		Fifth Third Bank Stadium; Kennesaw, GA	WPCH	W 48–3	6,743
October 14	6:00 p.m.	at Liberty		Williams Stadium; Lynchburg, VA	ESPN3	W 42–28	17,726
October 21	7:00 p.m.	Gardner–Webb^{†}		Fifth Third Bank Stadium; Kennesaw, GA	ESPN3	W 17–3	6,954
October 28	2:00 p.m.	at Presbyterian		Bailey Memorial Stadium; Clinton, SC	WPCH	W 28–0	2,804
November 4	2:00 p.m.	at Montana State*	No. 25	Bobcat Stadium; Bozeman, MT	WPCH	W 16–14	16,337
November 11	3:30 p.m.	Charleston Southern	No. 23	Fifth Third Bank Stadium; Kennesaw, GA	ESPN3	W 38–0	6,224
November 18	2:00 p.m.	Monmouth	No. 22	Fifth Third Bank Stadium; Kennesaw, GA	ESPN3	W 52–21	6,808
November 25	2:00 p.m.	No. 14 Samford*	No. 18	Fifth Third Bank Stadium; Kennesaw, GA (FCS Playoffs First Round)	ESPN3	W 28–17	5,516
December 2	2:00 p.m.	at No. 2 Jacksonville State*	No. 18	JSU Stadium; Jacksonville, AL (FCS Playoffs Second Round)	ESPN3	W 17–7	17,412
December 9	8:30 p.m.	at No. 5 Sam Houston State*	No. 18	Bowers Stadium; Huntsville, TX (FCS Playoffs Quarterfinals)	ESPN3	L 27–34	5,725
*Non-conference game; ^{†}Homecoming; Rankings from STATS Poll released prior to the game; All times are in Eastern time

- Source: Schedule

== Game summaries ==
=== @ Samford ===
Kennesaw State @ Samford

Team	1	2	3	4	Total
Owls	0	10	0	13	23
• No. 19 Bulldogs	0	7	14	7	28

- Date: September 2
- Location: Seibert Stadium
  Homewood, AL
- Game start: 7:00 p.m. EDT
- Elapsed time: 3:29
- Game attendance: 4,908
- Game weather: 78°F • S 18 • Overcast and windy
- Referee: Edwin Lee
- TV announcers (ESPN3/WPCH): Brian Katrek, Tutan Reyes, and Nathan McCreary

=== Tennessee Tech ===
Tennessee Tech @ Kennesaw State

Team	1	2	3	4	Total
Golden Eagles	0	0	0	14	14
• Owls	10	14	3	0	27

- Date: September 9
- Location: Fifth Third Bank Stadium
  Kennesaw, GA
- Game start: 7:00 p.m. EDT
- Elapsed time: 2:57
- Game attendance: 8,418
- Game weather: 74°F • ENE 8 • Sunny and clear
- Referee: Tra Blake
- TV announcers (BSN/WCPH): Brian Katrek, Tutan Reyes, and Chris Mooneyham

=== @ Alabama State ===
Kennesaw State @ Alabama State

Team	1	2	3	4	Total
• Owls	0	17	3	0	20
Hornets	0	7	7	0	14

- Date: September 16
- Location: The New ASU Stadium
  Montgomery, AL
- Game start: 8:00 p.m. EDT
- Elapsed time: 2:54
- Game attendance: 11,000
- Game weather: 78°F • E 4 • Partly cloudy
- Referee: Ron Turner
- TV announcers (ASAA): Jonathan Spells, Machion Sanders, Rob Taylor

=== North Greenville ===
North Greenville @ Kennesaw State

Team	1	2	3	4	Total
Crusaders	7	9	7	11	34
• Owls	14	7	7	10	38

- Date: September 30
- Location: Fifth Third Bank Stadium
  Kennesaw, GA
- Game start: 3:30 p.m. EDT
- Elapsed time: 3:19
- Game attendance: 6,161
- Game weather: 78°F • WNW 5 • Sunny
- Referee: Andy Faust
- TV announcers (WCPH): Brian Katrek, Tutan Reyes, and Chris Mooneyham

=== Texas Southern ===
Texas Southern @ Kennesaw State

Team	1	2	3	4	Total
Tigers	0	3	0	0	3
• Owls	10	24	7	7	48

- Date: October 7
- Location: Fifth Third Bank Stadium
  Kennesaw, GA
- Game start: 7:00 p.m. EDT
- Elapsed time: 2:39
- Game attendance: 6,743
- Game weather: 78°F • SE 8 • Overcast
- Referee: Jeff Flanagan
- TV announcers (WCPH): Brian Giffin, Brandon Joseph, Nathan McCreary

=== @ Liberty ===
Kennesaw State @ Liberty

Team	1	2	3	4	Total
• Owls	7	21	7	7	42
Flames	7	0	7	14	28

- Date: October 14
- Location: Williams Stadium
  Lynchburg, VA
- Game start: 6:00 p.m. EDT
- Elapsed time: 2:54
- Game attendance: 17,726
- Game weather: 73°F • SSE 3 • Sunny
- Referee: Stuart Mullins
- TV announcers (ESPN3): Brian Giffin, Tutan Reyes, Nathan McCreary

=== Gardner–Webb ===
Gardner–Webb @ Kennesaw State

Team	1	2	3	4	Total
Runnin' Bulldogs	0	0	3	0	3
• Owls	0	17	0	0	17

- Date: October 21
- Location: Fifth Third Bank Stadium
  Kennesaw, GA
- Game start: 7:00 p.m. EDT
- Elapsed time: 2:52
- Game attendance: 6,954
- Game weather: 71°F • ESE 5 • Clear
- Referee: Terrance Lamar
- TV announcers (ESPN3): Mike Hogewood, Renaldo Wynn

=== @ Presbyterian ===
Kennesaw State @ Presbyterian

Team	1	2	3	4	Total
• Owls	0	14	14	0	28
Blue Hose	0	0	0	0	0

- Date: October 28
- Location: Bailey Memorial Stadium
  Clinton, SC
- Game start: 2:30 p.m. EDT
- Elapsed time: 2:41
- Game attendance: 2,804
- Game weather: 68°F • SSE 9 • Partly Cloudy
- Referee: Jeff Heaser
- TV announcers (WPCH): Mark Bryant, John Orck

=== @ Montana State ===
Kennesaw State @ Montana State

Team	1	2	3	4	Total
• No. 25 Owls	7	3	3	3	16
Bobcats	7	0	7	0	14

- Date: November 4
- Location: Bobcat Stadium
  Bozeman, MT
- Game start: 2:00 p.m. EST
- Elapsed time: 2:50
- Game attendance: 16,337
- Game weather: 20°F • NNW 0–8 • Mild, 14" snow
- Referee: Greg Wilson
- TV announcers (WPCH): Chris Byers, Mike Callaghan, Kyle Sherman

=== Charleston Southern ===
Charleston Southern @ Kennesaw State

Team	1	2	3	4	Total
Buccaneers	0	0	0	0	0
• No. 23 Owls	7	14	3	14	38

- Date: November 11
- Location: Fifth Third Bank Stadium
  Kennesaw, GA
- Game start: 3:30 p.m. EST
- Elapsed time: 2:49
- Game attendance: 6,224
- Game weather: 55°F • Sunny
- Referee: Riley Johnson
- TV announcers (ESPN3): Mike Hogewood, Jay Sonnhalter

=== Monmouth ===
Monmouth @ Kennesaw State

Team	1	2	3	4	Total
Hawks	7	14	0	0	21
• No. 22 Owls	14	21	10	7	52

- Date: November 18
- Location: Fifth Third Bank Stadium
  Kennesaw, GA
- Game start: 2:00 p.m. EST
- Elapsed time: 2:50
- Game attendance: 6,808
- Game weather: 65°F • Partly Cloudy
- Referee: Jerry Magallane
- TV announcers (ESPN3): Mike Hogewood, Jay Sonnhalter

This victory clinched the Owls' first ever postseason bid.

== FCS Playoffs ==
=== Samford–First Round ===
Samford @ Kennesaw State

Team	1	2	3	4	Total
No. 14 Bulldogs	3	7	0	7	17
• No. 18 Owls	0	21	7	0	28

- Date: November 25
- Location: Fifth Third Bank Stadium
  Kennesaw, GA
- Game start: 2:00 p.m. EST
- Elapsed time: 3:13
- Game attendance: 5,566
- Game weather: 62°F • Partly Cloudy
- Referee: Steve Cadorette
- TV announcers (ESPN3): Dan Gutowsky, Marcus Ray

=== @ Jacksonville State–Second Round ===
Kennesaw State @ Jacksonville State

Team	1	2	3	4	Total
• No. 18 Owls	0	7	7	3	17
No. 2 Gamecocks	0	0	0	3	3

- Date: December 2
- Location: JSU Stadium
  Jacksonville, AL
- Game start: 2:00 p.m. EST
- Elapsed time: 2:44
- Game attendance: 17,412
- Game weather: 65°F • Partly Cloudy
- Referee: Warren Gillis
- TV announcers (ESPN3): Matt Stewart, Forrest Conoly

=== @ Sam Houston State–Quarterfinals ===
Kennesaw State @ Sam Houston State

Team	1	2	3	4	Total
No. 18 Owls	7	3	3	14	27
• No. 5 Bearkats	14	10	3	7	34

- Date: December 9
- Location: Bowers Stadium
  Huntsville, TX
- Game start: 8:30 p.m. EST
- Game attendance: 5,725
- Television network: ESPN3

== Ranking movements ==
Ranking movements Legend: ██ Increase in ranking ██ Decrease in ranking RV = Received votes
	Week													
Poll	Pre	1	2	3	4	5	6	7	8	9	10	11	12	Final
STATS FCS	RV	RV	RV	RV	RV	RV	RV	RV	RV	25	23	22	18	8
Coaches	RV	RV	RV	RV	RV	RV	RV	RV	RV	25	23	21	16	9
