= Daniel Harvey =

Daniel Harvey may refer to:

- Sir Daniel Harvey (diplomat) (1631–1672), merchant and English ambassador to the Ottoman Empire
- Daniel Harvey (British Army officer) (c. 1664–1732), British Army officer, MP for Dunwich, Clitheroe, and Weymouth and Melcombe Regis
- Daniel Cobb Harvey (1886–1966), Canadian historian
- Daniel Whittle Harvey (1786–1863), British Radical politician, Commissioner of the City of London Police and founder of the Sunday Times
- Daniel Harvey (soccer) (born 1982), former American soccer player
- Dan Harvey, British visual artist
- Dan Harvey, character in the serial Ace of Spades
- Dan Harvey (historian) (born 1959), retired Irish Defence Forces officer and military historian
