= 2017 Presbyterian Blue Hose football team =

American college football season

2017 Presbyterian Blue Hose football
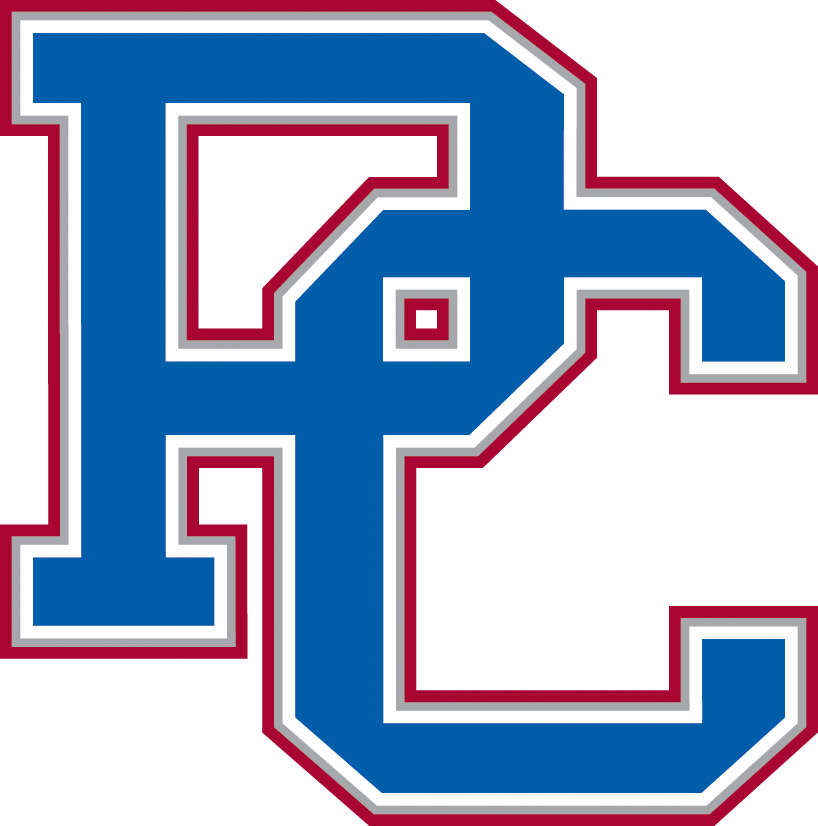
- Conference: Big South Conference
- Record: 4–7 (1–4 Big South)
- Head coach: Tommy Spangler (1st season of stint, 7th overall season)
- Offensive coordinator: Todd Varn (7th season)
- Defensive coordinator: Mitch Doolittle (1st season)
- Home stadium: Bailey Memorial Stadium

2017 Big South Conference football standings
| | Conf. | | | Overall |
| Team | W | | L | W | | L |
|---|---|---|---|---|---|---|
| No. 8 Kennesaw State $^ | 5 | – | 0 | 12 | – | 2 |
| Monmouth ^ | 4 | – | 1 | 9 | – | 3 |
| Charleston Southern | 3 | – | 2 | 6 | – | 5 |
| Liberty * | 2 | – | 3 | 6 | – | 5 |
| Presbyterian | 1 | – | 4 | 4 | – | 7 |
| Gardner–Webb | 0 | – | 5 | 1 | – | 10 |
$ – Conference champion; ^ – FCS playoff participant; * Liberty ineligible for postseason due to FBS transition; Rankings from STATS Poll

The 2017 Presbyterian Blue Hose football team represented Presbyterian College in the 2017 NCAA Division I FCS football season. They were led by first-year head coach Tommy Spangler, who was in his second stint as PC head coach, as he coached the Blue Hose from 2001–06. The Blue Hose played their home games at Bailey Memorial Stadium and as a member of the Big South Conference. They finished the season 4–7, 1–4 in Big South play to finish in fifth place.

== Schedule ==
| Date | Time | Opponent | Site | TV | Result | Attendance |
|---|---|---|---|---|---|---|
| August 31 | 6:30 p.m. | at Wake Forest* | BB&T Field; Winston-Salem, NC | ACCN Extra | L 7–51 | 22,643 |
| September 9 | Noon | No. 14 The Citadel* | Bailey Memorial Stadium; Clinton, SC | BSN | L 7–48 | 2,586 |
| September 16 | 7:00 p.m. | Campbell* | Bailey Memorial Stadium; Clinton, SC | BSN | W 28–16 | 2,204 |
| September 23 | 7:00 p.m. | No. 21 (NAIA) Cumberland* | Bailey Memorial Stadium; Clinton, SC | BSN | W 27–20 | 2,140 |
| September 30 | 7:00 p.m. | No. 7 Wofford* | Bailey Memorial Stadium; Clinton, SC | BSN | L 7–31 | 2,862 |
| October 7 | 1:00 p.m. | Saint Francis (PA)* | Bailey Memorial Stadium; Clinton, SC | BSN | W 26–14 | 1,675 |
| October 14 | Noon | Charleston Southern | Bailey Memorial Stadium; Clinton, SC | STADIUM | L 0–7 | 1,570 |
| October 28 | 2:30 p.m. | Kennesaw State^{†} | Bailey Memorial Stadium; Clinton, SC | CFDS | L 0–28 | 2,804 |
| November 4 | 1:00 p.m. | at Monmouth | Kessler Field; West Long Branch, NJ | ESPN3 | L 21–42 | 3,159 |
| November 11 | 3:30 p.m. | at Liberty | Williams Stadium; Lynchburg, VA | CFDS | L 28–47 | 18,001 |
| November 18 | 1:00 p.m. | Gardner–Webb | Bailey Memorial Stadium; Clinton, SC | BSN | W 31–21 | 2,717 |
*Non-conference game; ^{†}Homecoming; Rankings from STATS Poll released prior to the game; All times are in Eastern time

== Game summaries ==
=== At Wake Forest ===
Presbyterian Blue Hose at Wake Forest Demon Deacons

| Quarter | 1 | 2 | 3 | 4 | Total |
|---|---|---|---|---|---|
| Blue Hose | 0 | 0 | 0 | 7 | 7 |
| Demon Deacons | 16 | 21 | 14 | 0 | 51 |

at BB&T Field • Winston-Salem, NC

- Date: August 31, 2017
- Game time: 6:30 p.m. ET
- Game weather: 72 °F (22 °C) • WSW 4 • Overcast, some rain
- Game attendance: 22,643
- Referee: Tra Blake
- TV announcers (ACC Net. Extra): Play-by-Play: Shawn Kenney • Color Analyst: Al Groh

Game information

First Quarter

- 11:18 WAKE – Cam Serigne 8-yard pass from John Wolford (Mike Weaver kick failed), Demon Deacons 6–0. Drive: 5 plays, 33 yards, TOP 1:30
- 7:48 WAKE – Cam Serigne 26-yard pass from John Wolford (Mike Weaver kick), Demon Deacons 13–0. Drive: 6 plays, 63 yards, TOP 1:41
- 0:34 WAKE – Mike Weaver 41-yard field goal, Demon Deacons 16–0. Drive: 15 plays, 71 yards, TOP 5:00

Second Quarter

- 11:29 WAKE – John Wolford 2-yard run (Mike Weaver kick), Demon Deacons 23–0. Drive: 6 plays, 33 yards, TOP 1:52
- 8:25 WAKE – Greg Dortch 7-yard pass from John Wolford (Mike Weaver kick), Demon Deacons 30–0. Drive: 1 play, 7 yards, TOP 0:07
- 4:15 WAKE – Greg Dortch 42-yard pass from Kendall Hinton (Mike Weaver kick), Demon Deacons 37–0. Drive: 5 plays, 75 yards, TOP 2:07

Third Quarter

- 11:51 WAKE – Alex Bachman 29-yard pass from Kendall Hinton (Mike Weaver kick), Demon Deacons 44–0. Drive: 8 plays, 81 yards, TOP 3:09
- 1:39 WAKE – Kendall Hinton 1-yard run (Mike Weaver kick), Demon Deacons 51–0. Drive: 9 plays, 88 yards, TOP 2:54

Fourth Quarter

- 8:23 PRES – Mark Robinson 14-yard run (Brett Norton kick), Demon Deacons 51–7. Drive: 5 plays, 91 yards, TOP 2:45

Top Passers

- PRES – Ben Cheek, 2/9, 41 yards, 1 interception
- WAKE – Kendall Hinton, 7/8, 124 yards, 2 touchdowns

Top Rushers

- PRES – Torrance Marable, 16 carries, 162 yards
- WAKE – Arkeem Byrd, 7 carries, 75 yards

Top Receiving

- PRES – Darquez Watson, 1 reception, 30 yards
- WAKE – Tabari Hines, 5 receptions, 39 yards

Leading Tacklers

- PRES – Michael Fisher, 10 tackles
- WAKE – Cameron Glenn, 6 tackles

=== The Citadel ===
The Citadel Bulldogs at Presbyterian Blue Hose

| Quarter | 1 | 2 | 3 | 4 | Total |
|---|---|---|---|---|---|
| No. 14 Bulldogs | 14 | 21 | 6 | 7 | 48 |
| Blue Hose | 7 | 0 | 0 | 0 | 7 |

at Bailey Memorial Stadium • Clinton, SC

- Date: September 9
- Game time: 12:00 p.m. ET
- Game weather: 73 °F (23 °C) • NNE 12 • Sunny
- Game attendance: 2,586
- Referee: Greg Waybright
- TV announcers (BSN/ESPN3): Play-by-Play: Kendall Lewis · Color Analyst: James Riley · Sidelines: Eric Summers

Game information

First Quarter

- 6:36 CIT – Dominique Allen 1-yard run (Jacob Godek kick), Bulldogs 7–0. Drive: 8 plays, 52 yards, TOP 3:34
- 6:18 PRES – Torrance Marable 76-yard run (Brett Norton kick), Tied 7–7. Drive: 1 play, 76 yards, TOP 0:13
- 1:55 CIT – Lorenzo Ward 5-yard run (Jacob Godek kick), Bulldogs 14–7. Drive: 10 plays, 75 yards, TOP 4:23

Second Quarter

- 13:21 CIT – Raleigh Webb 57-yard pass from Jordan Black (Jacob Godek kick), Bulldogs 21–7. Drive: 4 plays, 74 yards, TOP 1:39
- 8:22 CIT – Rod Johnson 18-yard pass from Jordan Black (Jacob Godek kick), Bulldogs 28–7. Drive: 6 plays, 74 yards, TOP 2:34
- 1:09 CIT – Dominique Allen 1-yard run (Jacob Godek kick), Bulldogs 35–7. Drive: 11 plays, 52 yards, TOP 5:25

Third Quarter

- 5:41 CIT – Dominique Allen 2-yard run (Jacob Godek kick failed), Bulldogs 41–7. Drive: 14 plays, 81 yards, TOP 7:53

Fourth Quarter

- 5:27 CIT – Brandon Rainey 14-yard pass from Jordan Black (Jacob Godek kick), Bulldogs 48–7. Drive: 18 plays, 92 yards, TOP 9:19

Top Passers

- CIT – Jordan Black, 3/3, 89 yards, 3 touchdowns
- PRES – Will Brock, 9/15, 86 yards, 1 interception

Top Rushers

- CIT – Jordan Black, 12 carries, 103 yards
- PRES – Torrance Marable, 7 carries, 93 yards, 1 touchdown

Top Receiving

- CIT – Raliegh Webb, 1 reception, 57 yards, 1 touchdown
- PRES – Cedric Frazier, 5 receptions, 50 yards

Leading Tacklers

- CIT – Myles Pierce, 6 tackles
- PRES – Grant Beidel, 17 tackles

=== Campbell ===
Campbell Fighting Camels at Presbyterian Blue Hose

| Quarter | 1 | 2 | 3 | 4 | Total |
|---|---|---|---|---|---|
| Fighting Camels | 3 | 0 | 0 | 13 | 16 |
| Blue Hose | 0 | 21 | 0 | 7 | 28 |

at Bailey Memorial Stadium • Clinton, SC

- Date: September 16
- Game time: 7:00 p.m. ET
- Game weather: 82 °F (28 °C) • NE 4 • Mostly clear
- Game attendance: 2,204
- Referee: Gary Patterson
- TV announcers (BSN): Play by Play: Chris Hemeyer · Color Analyst: Bill McMillan

Game information

First Quarter

- 7:47 CAMP – Mitchell Brown 20-yard field goal, Fighting Camels 3–0. Drive: 11 plays, 86 yards, TOP 5:46

Second Quarter

- 13:32 PRES – Mark Robinson 14-yard run (Brett Norton kick), Blue Hose 7–3. Drive: 13 plays, 70 yards, TOP 6:03
- 6:48 PRES – Torrance Marable 63-yard pass from Ben Cheek (Brett Norton kick), Blue Hose 14–3. Drive: 8 plays, 81 yards, TOP 4:14
- 2:33 PRES – Damien McGhee 70-yard pass from Ben Cheek (Brett Norton kick), Blue Hose 21–3. Drive: 3 plays, 80 yards, TOP 1:27

Fourth Quarter

- 9:23 CAMP – Montel Goods 7-yard run (Mitchell Brown kick), Blue Hose 21–10. Drive: 6 plays, 57 yards, TOP 2:04
- 2:32 PRES – Mark Robinson 1-yard run (Brett Norton kick), Blue Hose 28–10. Drive: 6 plays, 47 yards, TOP 3:36
- 0:28 CAMP – Bryan Bailey 13-yard pass from Daniel Smith (two-point pass conv. failed), Blue Hose 28–16. Drive: 12 plays, 75 yards, TOP 2:04

Top Passers

- CAMP – Daniel Smith, 15/29, 186 yards, 1 touchdown, 1 interception
- PRES – Ben Cheek, 5/12, 142 yards, 2 touchdowns

Top Rushers

- CAMP – Daniel Smith, 18 carries, 102 yards
- PRES – Mark Robinson, 13 carries, 86 yards, 2 touchdowns

Top Receiving

- CAMP – Bryan Bailey, 4 receptions, 123 yards, 1 touchdown
- PRES – Damien McGhee, 1 reception, 70 yards, 1 touchdown

Leading Tacklers

- CAMP – Ryan Jack, 12 tackles
- PRES – Nick Moss, 10 tackles

=== Cumberland (TN) ===
Cumberland (TN) Phoenix at Presbyterian Blue Hose

| Quarter | 1 | 2 | 3 | 4 | Total |
|---|---|---|---|---|---|
| No. 21 (NAIA) Phoenix | 7 | 0 | 13 | 0 | 20 |
| Blue Hose | 7 | 10 | 3 | 7 | 27 |

at Bailey Memorial Stadium • Clinton, SC

- Date: September 23
- Game time: 7:00 p.m. ET
- Game weather: 84 °F (29 °C) • Calm • Clear, warm
- Game attendance: 2,140
- Referee: Grey Waybright
- TV announcers (BSN): Play-by-Play: Ryan Clary · Color Analyst: John Orck

Game information

First Quarter

- 9:13 PRES – Mark Robinson 1-yard run (Brett Norton kick), Blue Hose 7–0. Drive: 10 plays, 49 yards, TOP 4:20
- 1:29 CUMB – Dezmon Huntley 3-yard run (Pablo D. Travecedo kick), Tied 7–7. Drive: 15 plays, 72 yards, TOP 7:34

Second Quarter

- 11:33 PRES – Torrance Marable 11-yard pass from Ben Cheek (Brett Norton kick), Blue Hose 14–7. Drive: 10 plays, 76 yards, TOP 4:52
- 4:21 PRES – Brett Norton 28-yard field goal, Blue Hose 17–7. Drive: 10 plays, 48 yards, TOP 5:30

Third Quarter

- 14:10 CUMB – Dezmon Huntley 21-yard run (Pablo D. Travecedo kick blocked), Blue Hose 17–13. Drive: 3 plays, 25 yards, TOP 0:37
- 9:46 CUMB – Kendall Johnson 6-yard run (Pablo D. Travecedo kick), Phoenix 20–17. Drive: 7 plays, 30 yards, TOP 2:44
- 4:20 PRES – Brett Norton 47-yard field goal, Tied 20–20. Drive: 12 plays, 40 yards, TOP 5:18

Fourth Quarter

- 2:40 PRES – DaShawn Davis 49-yard run (Brett Norton kick), Blue Hose 27–20. Drive: 2 plays, 62 yards, TOP 0:47

Top Passers

- CUMB – Dezmon Huntley, 11/29, 85 yards
- PRES – Ben Cheek, 14/15, 148 yards, 1 touchdown

Top Rushers

- CUMB – Dezmon Huntley, 10 carries, 102 yards, 2 touchdowns
- PRES – Torrance Marable, 24 carries, 139 yards

Top Receiving

- CUMB – Denarius Toliver, 2 receptions, 33 yards
- PRES – Dashawn Davis, 4 receptions, 69 yards

Leading Tacklers

- CUMB – DeAnthony Patrick, 14 tackles
- PRES – Grant Beidel, 15 tackles

=== Wofford ===
Wofford Terriers at Presbyterian Blue Hose

| Quarter | 1 | 2 | 3 | 4 | Total |
|---|---|---|---|---|---|
| No. 7 Terriers | 14 | 0 | 3 | 14 | 31 |
| Blue Hose | 0 | 7 | 0 | 0 | 7 |

at Bailey Memorial Stadium • Clinton, SC

- Date: September 30
- Game time: 7:00 p.m. ET
- Game weather: 74 °F (23 °C) • Calm • Clear
- Game attendance: 2,862
- Referee: Jeffery Page
- TV announcers (BSN): Play-by-Play: Ryan Clary · Color Analyst: John Orck

Game information

First Quarter

- 12:08 WOFF – Blake Morgan 94-yard run (Luke Carter kick), Terriers 7–0. Drive: 1 play, 94 yards, TOP 0:18
- 0:22 WOFF – Andre Stoddard 15-yard run (Luke Carter kick), Terriers 14–0. Drive: 11 plays, 80 yards, TOP 5:13

Second Quarter

- 6:25 PRES – Torrance Marable 7-yard run (Brett Norton kick), Terriers 14–7. Drive: 11 plays, 60 yards, TOP 5:36

Third Quarter

- 1:54 WOFF – Luke Carter 19-yard field goal, Terriers 17–7. Drive: 13 plays, 97 yards, TOP 6:59

Fourth Quarter

- 12:37 WOFF – Blake Morgan 5-yard run (Luke Carter kick), Terriers 24–7. Drive: 6 plays, 77 yards, TOP 2:38
- 7:34 WOFF – Jason Hill 75-yard pass from Lennox McAfee (Luke Carter kick), Terriers 31–7. Drive: 2 plays, 80 yards, TOP 0:50

Top Passers

- WOFF – Brandon Goodson, 3/7, 92 yards
- PRES – Ben Cheek, 19/30, 130 yards, 1 interception

Top Rushers

- WOFF – Blake Morgan, 7 carries, 120 yards, 2 touchdowns
- PRES – Ben Cheek, 11 carries, 44 yards

Top Receiving

- WOFF – Jason Hill, 1 reception, 75 yards, 1 touchdown
- PRES – Dashawn Davis, 5 receptions, 44 yards

Leading Tacklers

- WOFF – Daryl Vining, 9 tackles
- PRES – Grant Beidel, 12 tackles

=== Saint Francis ===
Saint Francis Red Flash at Presbyterian Blue Hose

| Quarter | 1 | 2 | 3 | 4 | Total |
|---|---|---|---|---|---|
| Red Flash | 0 | 0 | 7 | 7 | 14 |
| Blue Hose | 3 | 9 | 0 | 14 | 26 |

at Bailey Memorial Stadium • Clinton, SC

- Date: October 7
- Game time: 1:00 p.m. ET
- Game weather: 70 °F (21 °C) • Calm • Light drizzle
- Game attendance: 1,675
- TV announcers (BSN): Play-by-Play: Ryan Clary · Color Analyst: John Orck

Game information

First Quarter

- 0:07 PRES – Brett Norton 35-yard field goal, Blue Hose 7–0. Drive: 9 plays, 47 yards, TOP 4:01

Second Quarter

- 14:11 PRES – Team Safety, Blue Hose 5–0. Drive: 4 plays, -15 yards, TOP 0:51
- 4:33 PRES – Malachi Brown 17-yard return of blocked punt (Tim Hartshorn kick), Blue Hose 12–0. Drive: 6 plays, 16 yards, TOP 3:12

Third Quarter

- 6:28 FRAN – Louie Gartner 49-yard fumble return (Eric Bofenkamp kick), Blue Hose 12–7. Drive: 1 play, 1 yard, TOP 0:15

Fourth Quarter

- 9:43 PRES – DarQuez Watson 50-yard pass from Ben Cheek (Tim Hartshorn kick), Blue Hose 19–7. Drive: 10 plays, 94 yards, TOP 5:31
- 8:08 FRAN – Jymere Jordan-Toney 15-yard pass from Bear Fenimore (Eric Bofenkamp kick), Blue Hose 19–14. Drive: 5 plays, 75 yards, TOP 1:35
- 4:01 PRES – Torrance Marable 12-yard run (Marquise Inabinet kick), Blue Hose 26–14. Drive: 8 plays, 79 yards, TOP 4:02

Top Passers

- FRAN – Bear Fenimore, 18/33, 185 yards, 1 touchdown, 1 interception
- PRES – Ben Cheek, 10/18, 153 yards, 1 touchdown

Top Rushers

- FRAN – Jymere Jordan-Toney, 19 carries, 89 yards
- PRES – Ben Cheek, 15 carries, 93 yards

Top Receiving

- FRAN – Kamron Lewis, 7 receptions, 58 yards
- PRES – Darquez Watson, 3 receptions, 65 yards, 1 touchdown

Leading Tacklers

- FRAN – Sean Orsini, 13 tackles
- PRES – Ryan Burgess, 10 tackles

=== Charleston Southern ===
Charleston Southern Buccaneers at Presbyterian Blue Hose

| Quarter | 1 | 2 | 3 | 4 | Total |
|---|---|---|---|---|---|
| Buccaneers | 0 | 0 | 0 | 7 | 7 |
| Blue Hose | 0 | 0 | 0 | 0 | 0 |

at Bailey Memorial Stadium • Clinton, SC

- Date: October 14
- Game time: Noon ET
- Game weather: 70 °F (21 °C) • Overcast • Calm
- Game attendance: 1,570
- Referee: Duane Heydt
- TV announcers (STADIUM): Play-by-Play: Mike Hogewood • Color Analyst: Renaldo Wynn

Game information

Fourth Quarter

- 3:43 CHSO – Noah Shuler 2 yard run (Tyler Tekac kick), Buccaneers 7–0. Drive: 4 plays, 15 yards, TOP 2:01

Top Passers

- CHSO – Shane Bucenell, 4/9, 28 yards, 1 interception
- PRES – Ben Cheek, 19/26, 128 yards

Top Rushers

- CHSO – Noah Shuler, 13 carries, 62 yards, 1 touchdown
- PRES – Ben Cheek, 14 carries, 42 yards

Top Receiving

- CHSO – Kameron Brown, 2 receptions, 16 yards
- PRES – Dashawn Davis, 5 receptions, 62 yards

Leading Tacklers

- CHSO – J.D. Sosebee, 8 tackles
- PRES – Elijah Turner, 8 tackles

=== Kennesaw State ===
Kennesaw State Owls at Presbyterian Blue Hose

| Quarter | 1 | 2 | 3 | 4 | Total |
|---|---|---|---|---|---|
| Owls | 0 | 14 | 14 | 0 | 28 |
| Blue Hose | 0 | 0 | 0 | 0 | 0 |

at Bailey Memorial Stadium • Clinton, SC

- Date: October 28
- Game time: 2:30 p.m. ET

Game information

First Quarter
Second Quarter
Third Quarter
Fourth Quarter

Top Passers

- KENN –
- PRES –

Top Rushers

- KENN –
- PRES –

Top Receiving

- KENN –
- PRES –

=== At Monmouth ===
Presbyterian Blue Hose at Monmouth Hawks

| Quarter | 1 | 2 | 3 | 4 | Total |
|---|---|---|---|---|---|
| Blue Hose | 7 | 7 | 7 | 0 | 21 |
| Hawks | 7 | 7 | 21 | 7 | 42 |

at Kessler Field • West Long Branch, NJ

- Date: November 4
- Game time: 1:00 p.m. ET
- TV: ESPN3

Game information

First Quarter
Second Quarter
Third Quarter
Fourth Quarter

Top Passers

- PRES –
- MON –

Top Rushers

- PRES –
- MON –

Top Receiving

- PRES –
- MON –

=== At Liberty ===
Presbyterian Blue Hose at Liberty Flames

| Quarter | 1 | 2 | 3 | 4 | Total |
|---|---|---|---|---|---|
| Blue Hose | 7 | 0 | 14 | 7 | 28 |
| Flames | 24 | 9 | 7 | 7 | 47 |

at Williams Stadium • Lynchburg, VA

- Date: November 11
- Game time: 3:30 p.m. ET

Game information

First Quarter
Second Quarter
Third Quarter
Fourth Quarter

Top Passers

- PRES –
- LIB –

Top Rushers

- PRES –
- LIB –

Top Receiving

- PRES –
- LIB –

=== Gardner–Webb ===
Gardner–Webb Runnin' Bulldogs at Presbyterian Blue Hose

| Quarter | 1 | 2 | 3 | 4 | Total |
|---|---|---|---|---|---|
| Runnin' Bulldogs | 7 | 0 | 0 | 14 | 21 |
| Blue Hose | 3 | 0 | 14 | 14 | 31 |

at Bailey Memorial Stadium • Clinton, SC

- Date: November 18
- Game time: 1:00 p.m. ET

Game information

First Quarter
Second Quarter
Third Quarter
Fourth Quarter

Top Passers

- GW –
- PRES –

Top Rushers

- GW –
- PRES –

Top Receiving

- GW –
- PRES –

== Roster ==
2017 Presbyterian Blue Hose football team roster
Players
Coaches
Offense

| Pos. | # | Name | Class |
|---|---|---|---|
| QB | 1 | Will Brock | Sr |
| WR | 3 | Shadarius Harvey | So |
| RB | 4 | Torrance Marable | Fr |
| WR | 5 | DaShawn Davis | Jr |
| QB | 8 | Ben Cheek | Jr |
| WR | 9 | DarQuez Watson | Sr |
| WR | 11 | Kyle Goddard | So |
| QB | 12 | Mario Cusano | Fr |
| RB | 13 | Zola Davis | Jr |
| QB | 13 | Trey Keels | Fr |
| QB | 16 | John Walker | Jr |
| QB | 17 | Cal King | So |
| WR | 18 | Keith Pearson | Fr |
| RB | 27 | DeAngilo Drayton | Fr |
| RB | 32 | Mark Robinson | Fr |
| RB | 35 | Glass Wilson | So |
| TE | 43 | Cody Montgomery | So |
| FB | 46 | Marquise Inabinet | So |
| OL | 51 | Ralph Singleton | Fr |
| OL | 52 | Jerius Duncan | So |
| OL | 53 | Guy Revelle | So |
| OL | 54 | Timothy Wilkins | Fr |
| OL | 55 | Zane Dimiati | Fr |
| OL | 58 | Adonis Sealey | So |
| FB | 59 | Detrel Rush | Fr |
| OL | 61 | Frank Keller | Jr |
| OL | 62 | Zach Darst | Jr |
| OL | 63 | Matthew Tindall | Fr |
| OL | 64 | Matt Mellette | Fr |
| OL | 65 | Eli Teeselink | So |
| OL | 67 | Thomas Hughes | Sr |
| OL | 69 | Zach Cooper | Jr |
| OL | 70 | Thomas Broom | Jr |
| OL | 71 | Joe Kelly | Jr |
| OL | 73 | Wil Easler | Fr |
| OL | 75 | Ethan Williams | Fr |
| OL | 76 | Tobias Hagins | Jr |
| OL | 78 | John Biscardi | Sr |
| OL | 79 | George Crosby | Fr |
| WR | 80 | Lucas Catalfomo | Fr |
| WR | 81 | Cedric Frazier | So |
| WR | 82 | Creighton Buchanan | Fr |
| TE | 83 | Luke Foster | Fr |
| WR | 84 | DeAndre' Ryan | Fr |
| TE | 85 | Riley Hilton | Jr |
| WR | 86 | Damien McGhee | So |
| WR | 87 | Hayden Sanders | Sr |
| TE | 89 | Jameel Padgett | So |

Defense

| Pos. | # | Name | Class |
|---|---|---|---|
| DB | 2 | Rock Ya-Sin | Jr |
| DB | 6 | Michael Fisher | Jr |
| DL | 7 | Gyasi Yeldell | Jr |
| LB | 10 | Grant Beidel | Sr |
| DB | 14 | Elijah Turner | So |
| DL | 15 | Jaylen Lindsay | Jr |
| CB | 19 | Dirk Cureton | Fr |
| DB | 20 | Kenneth Coleman | Jr |
| LB | 21 | Maleek Catchings | Jr |
| LB | 22 | Antonio Leroy | Fr |
| DB | 23 | Robert Baker | Jr |
| DB | 24 | Malachi Brown | So |
| DB | 25 | Ryan Burgess | Jr |
| DB | 25 | Orinthius Byrd | Fr |
| DB | 26 | Rod Haygood | Fr |
| DB | 28 | Trent Carrington | Fr |
| DB | 29 | Joey Junius | So |
| LB | 30 | Michael Hector | So |
| LB | 31 | Nick Moss | So |
| DE | 33 | Airon Buick | Fr |
| LB | 34 | Dante Boyd | Jr |
| LB | 39 | David Bramble | Fr |
| LB | 40 | Austin Brundidge | Fr |
| LB | 41 | Michael Malinovsky | Fr |
| LB | 42 | Kimonti Murray | Fr |
| LB | 43 | Will Roberts | Fr |
| LB | 44 | Colby Campbell | Fr |
| DE | 45 | Mac McLennan | Fr |
| DE | 48 | Nick Chiaravalloti | Fr |
| LB | 49 | Hayden Caraway | Jr |
| LB | 57 | Tre Lanham | Fr |
| DL | 68 | Darrius Rowe | Jr |
| LB | 91 | Imani Heslop | So |
| DE | 92 | Amos Corgelas | Fr |
| DT | 93 | Michael Branch | So |
| DT | 94 | Chad Stevens | Fr |
| DL | 95 | Tanner Wilhelm | Fr |
| DE | 96 | Brien Washington | Jr |
| DL | 97 | KJ Presley | Fr |
| DL | 98 | Tyler Wilhelm | Fr |
| DE | 99 | William Callaway | Fr |
| DL | | Colin Torres | Fr |
| DB | | Taji Whitener | Fr |

Special teams

| Pos. | # | Name | Class |
|---|---|---|---|
| K | 12 | Brett Norton | Jr |
| P | 22 | Gardner Duckworth | So |
| K | 30 | Grayson Maxfield | Fr |
| K | 36 | Tim Hartshorn | Jr |
| P | 37 | R.J. Bacon | Fr |
| LS | 38 | Brandt Cameron | Jr |
| P | 41 | Jackson Boland | Jr |
| LS | 56 | Cooper Short | Fr |
| LS | 59 | Joe Christian | Fr |
| LS | 60 | Omar Fattah | Fr |

Head coach

- Tommy Spangler

Coordinators/assistant coaches

- Todd Varn (Off. Coord.)
- Mitch Doolittle (Def. Coord.)
- Taylor Cornett
- DaRon Dickey
- Mitch Hall
- Clay Hodges
- Roland Matthews
- Adam Mims
- Joey Orck

Legend

- (C) Team captain
- (S) Suspended
- (I) Ineligible
- Injured
- Redshirt

Roster
Last update: August 3, 2017
