= 2017 Charleston Southern Buccaneers football team =

American college football season

2017 Charleston Southern Buccaneers football
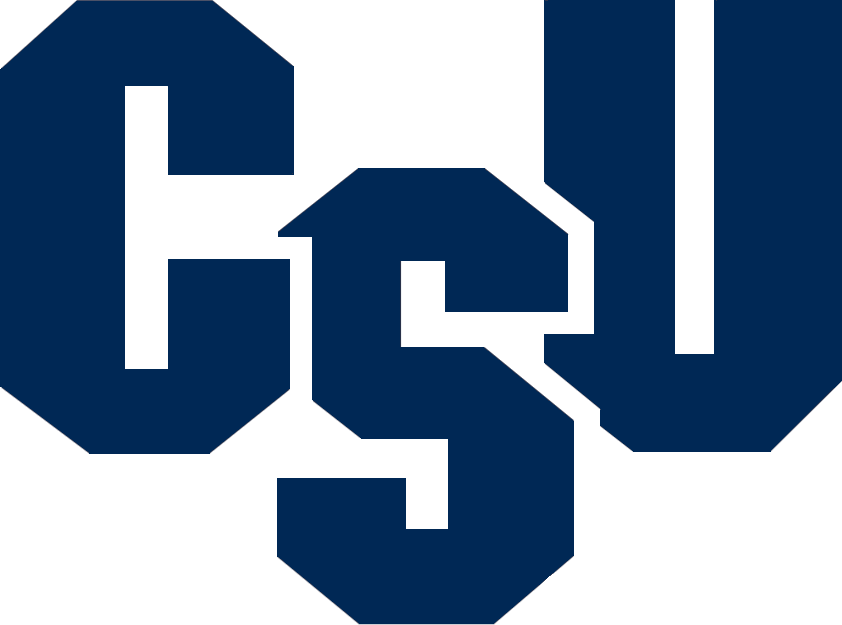
- Conference: Big South Conference
- Record: 6–5 (3–2 Big South)
- Head coach: Mark Tucker (1st season)
- Defensive coordinator: Zane Vance (1st season)
- Home stadium: Buccaneer Field

2017 Big South Conference football standings
	Conf.			Overall
Team	W		L	W		L
No. 8 Kennesaw State $^	5	–	0	12	–	2
Monmouth ^	4	–	1	9	–	3
Charleston Southern	3	–	2	6	–	5
Liberty *	2	–	3	6	–	5
Presbyterian	1	–	4	4	–	7
Gardner–Webb	0	–	5	1	–	10
$ – Conference champion; ^ – FCS playoff participant; * Liberty ineligible for postseason due to FBS transition; Rankings from STATS Poll

The 2017 Charleston Southern Buccaneers football team represented Charleston Southern University as a member of the Big South Conference during the 2017 NCAA Division I FCS football season. Led by first-year head coach Mark Tucker, the Buccaneers compiled an overall record of 6–5 with a mark of 3–2 in conference play, placing third in the Big South. Charleston Southern played home games at Buccaneer Field in Charleston, South Carolina.

== Schedule ==
Date	Time	Opponent	Rank	Site	TV	Result	Attendance
September 2	4:00 p.m.	at Mississippi State*	No. 14	Davis Wade Stadium; Starkville, MS	SECN	L 0–49	54,215
September 9		South Carolina State*		Oliver C. Dawson Stadium; Orangeburg, SC		Cancelled	
September 16	6:00 p.m.	at Elon*	No. 16	Rhodes Stadium; Elon, NC	CSL	L 17–19	5,248
September 23	6:00 p.m.	Point*		Buccaneer Field; Charleston, SC	BSN	W 66–0	1,945
September 30	6:00 p.m.	Mississippi Valley State*		Buccaneer Field; Charleston, SC	BSN	W 58–7	1,456
October 7	3:30 p.m.	at Indiana*		Memorial Stadium; Bloomington, IN	BTN	L 0–27	35,995
October 14	Noon	at Presbyterian		Bailey Memorial Stadium; Clinton, SC	STADIUM	W 7–0	1,570
October 21	6:00 p.m.	Savannah State*		Buccaneer Field; Charleston, SC	BSN	W 52–27	3,156
October 28	6:00 p.m.	Monmouth^{†}		Buccaneer Field; Charleston, SC	ESPN3	L 20–23	1,825
November 4	1:30 p.m.	at Gardner–Webb		Spangler Stadium; Boiling Springs, NC	7C	W 10–9	2,850
November 11	3:30 p.m.	at No. 23 Kennesaw State		Fifth Third Bank Stadium; Kennesaw, GA	ESPN3	L 0–38	6,224
November 18	Noon	Liberty		Buccaneer Field; Charleston, SC		W 20–19	3,345
*Non-conference game; ^{†}Homecoming; Rankings from STATS Poll released prior to the game; All times are in Eastern time

^{^[a]}The game between Charleston Southern and South Carolina State had been rescheduled in advance of the arrival of Hurricane Irma, but on September 7, both schools agreed to postpone the game later in the season and the game was ultimately cancelled. The game was replaced with a match-up versus Indiana on October 7.

== Game summaries ==
=== At Mississippi State ===
	1	2	3	4	Total
No. 14 Buccaneers	0	0	0	0	0
Bulldogs	23	12	7	7	49

=== At Elon ===
	1	2	3	4	Total
No. 16 Buccaneers	0	7	0	10	17
Phoenix	6	7	6	0	19

=== Point ===
	1	2	3	4	Total
Skyhawks	0	0	0	0	0
Buccaneers	14	17	14	21	66

=== Mississippi Valley State ===
	1	2	3	4	Total
Delta Devils	0	7	0	0	7
Buccaneers	0	10	35	13	58

=== At Indiana ===
	1	2	3	4	Total
Buccaneers	0	0	0	0	0
Hoosiers	10	14	3	0	27

=== At Presbyterian ===
	1	2	3	4	Total
Buccaneers	0	0	0	7	7
Blue Hose	0	0	0	0	0

=== Savannah State ===
	1	2	3	4	Total
Tigers	10	7	3	7	27
Buccaneers	14	17	14	7	52

=== Monmouth ===
	1	2	3	4	Total
Hawks	0	16	7	0	23
Buccaneers	0	0	7	13	20

=== At Gardner–Webb ===
	1	2	3	4	Total
Buccaneers	7	0	0	3	10
Runnin' Bulldogs	3	3	0	3	9

=== At Kennesaw State ===
	1	2	3	4	Total
Buccaneers	0	0	0	0	0
No. 23 Owls	7	14	3	14	38

=== Liberty ===
	1	2	3	4	Total
Flames	0	7	9	3	19
Buccaneers	0	7	0	13	20

== Ranking movements ==
Ranking movements Legend: ██ Increase in ranking ██ Decrease in ranking — = Not ranked RV = Received votes
	Week													
Poll	Pre	1	2	3	4	5	6	7	8	9	10	11	12	Final
STATS FCS	14	16	16	RV	RV	RV	RV	RV	RV	RV	RV	—	—	—
Coaches	14	18	19	RV	RV	RV	—	—	—	—	—	—	—	—
