= 2017 Gardner–Webb Runnin' Bulldogs football team =

American college football season

2017 Gardner–Webb Runnin' Bulldogs football
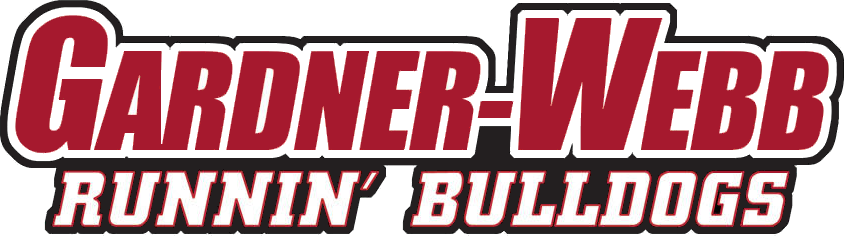
- Conference: Big South Conference
- Record: 1–10 (0–5 Big South)
- Head coach: Carroll McCray (5th season)
- Offensive coordinator: Brett Nichols (3rd season)
- Defensive coordinator: Travis Cunningham (2nd season)
- Home stadium: Ernest W. Spangler Stadium

2017 Big South Conference football standings
	Conf.			Overall
Team	W		L	W		L
No. 8 Kennesaw State $^	5	–	0	12	–	2
Monmouth ^	4	–	1	9	–	3
Charleston Southern	3	–	2	6	–	5
Liberty *	2	–	3	6	–	5
Presbyterian	1	–	4	4	–	7
Gardner–Webb	0	–	5	1	–	10
$ – Conference champion; ^ – FCS playoff participant; * Liberty ineligible for postseason due to FBS transition; Rankings from STATS Poll

The 2017 Gardner–Webb Runnin' Bulldogs football team represented Gardner–Webb University as a member of the Big South Conference during the 2017 NCAA Division I FCS football season. Led by fifth-year head coach Carroll McCray, the Runnin' Bulldogs compiled an overall record of 1–10 with a mark of 0–5 in conference play, placing last out of six teams in the Big South. Gardner–Webb played home games at Ernest W. Spangler Stadium in Boiling Springs, North Carolina.

== Schedule ==
Date	Time	Opponent	Site	TV	Result	Attendance
September 2	6:00 p.m.	North Carolina A&T*	Ernest W. Spangler Stadium; Boiling Springs, NC	BSN	L 3–45	7,015
September 9	4:00 p.m.	at Wyoming*	War Memorial Stadium; Laramie, WY	ATTSNRM	L 0–27	19,051
September 16	6:00 p.m.	Western Carolina*	Ernest W. Spangler Stadium; Boiling Springs, NC	WMYA	L 27–42	6,152
September 23	1:30 p.m.	at No. 9 Wofford*	Gibbs Stadium; Spartanburg, SC	ESPN3	L 24–27	2,862
October 7	1:30 p.m.	Shorter*	Ernest W. Spangler Stadium; Boiling Springs, NC	BSN	W 42–14	3,150
October 14	2:00 p.m.	at No. 25 North Carolina Central*	O'Kelly–Riddick Stadium; Durham, NC	NSN	L 17–24	4,010
October 21	7:00 p.m.	at Kennesaw State	Fifth Third Bank Stadium; Kennesaw, GA	ESPN3	L 3-17	6,954
October 28	Noon	Liberty	Ernest W. Spangler Stadium; Boiling Springs, NC	STADIUM	L 17-33	3,850
November 4	1:30 p.m.	Charleston Southern	Ernest W. Spangler Stadium; Boiling Springs, NC	BSN	L 9-10	2,850
November 11	Noon	at Monmouth	Kessler Field; West Long Branch, NJ	STADIUM	L 14–41	2,278
November 18	1:00 p.m.	at Presbyterian	Bailey Memorial Stadium; Clinton, SC	BSN	L 21–31	2,717
*Non-conference game; Rankings from STATS Poll released prior to the game; All times are in Eastern time

== Game summaries ==
=== North Carolina A&T ===
	1	2	3	4	Total
Aggies	19	14	12	0	45
Runnin' Bulldogs	0	0	0	3	3

=== At Wyoming ===
	1	2	3	4	Total
Runnin' Bulldogs	0	0	0	0	0
Cowboys	14	10	0	3	27

=== Western Carolina ===
	1	2	3	4	Total
Catamounts	7	14	14	7	42
Runnin' Bulldogs	0	13	0	14	27

=== At Wofford ===
	1	2	3	4	Total
Runnin' Bulldogs	0	10	7	7	24
No. 9 Terriers	3	14	10	0	27

=== Shorter ===
	1	2	3	4	Total
Hawks	6	8	0	0	14
Runnin' Bulldogs	14	14	7	7	42

=== At North Carolina Central ===
	1	2	3	4	Total
Runnin' Bulldogs	0	3	0	14	17
No. 25 Eagles	3	7	7	7	24

=== At Kennesaw State ===
	1	2	3	4	Total
Runnin' Bulldogs	0	0	3	0	3
Owls	0	17	0	0	17

=== Liberty ===
	1	2	3	4	Total
Flames	6	6	7	14	33
Runnin' Bulldogs	0	7	3	7	17

=== Charleston Southern ===
	1	2	3	4	Total
Buccaneers	7	0	0	3	10
Runnin' Bulldogs	3	3	0	3	9

=== At Monmouth ===
	1	2	3	4	Total
Runnin' Bulldogs	0	7	0	7	14
Hawks	20	7	7	7	41

=== At Presbyterian ===
	1	2	3	4	Total
Runnin' Bulldogs	7	0	0	14	21
Blue Hose	3	0	14	14	31
