= 2017 Liberty Flames football team =

American college football season

2017 Liberty Flames football
- Conference: Big South Conference
- Record: 6–5 (2–3 Big South)
- Head coach: Turner Gill (6th season)
- Offensive coordinator: Joe Dailey (2nd season)
- Offensive scheme: Spread
- Co-defensive coordinators: Robert Wimberly (6th season); Vantz Singletary (6th season)
- Base defense: 4–3
- Home stadium: Williams Stadium

2017 Big South Conference football standings
	Conf.			Overall
Team	W		L	W		L
No. 8 Kennesaw State $^	5	–	0	12	–	2
Monmouth ^	4	–	1	9	–	3
Charleston Southern	3	–	2	6	–	5
Liberty *	2	–	3	6	–	5
Presbyterian	1	–	4	4	–	7
Gardner–Webb	0	–	5	1	–	10
$ – Conference champion; ^ – FCS playoff participant; * Liberty ineligible for postseason due to FBS transition; Rankings from STATS Poll

The 2017 Liberty Flames football team represented Liberty University in the 2017 NCAA Division I FCS football season. They were led by sixth-year head coach Turner Gill and played their home games at Williams Stadium. They were a member of the Big South Conference. They finished the season 6–5, 2–3 in Big South play to finish in fourth place.

School president Jerry Falwell Jr. announced plans to undergo the two-year transition period join the Division I FBS as a football independent, while remaining in the Big South Conference in all other sports. While normally against NCAA rules to transition to FBS without a conference invite, Liberty was granted a waiver.

== Preseason ==
=== Media poll ===
The 2017 Big South preseason prediction poll was released on July 18. The Flames were ineligible due to their transition to the FBS.

== Schedule ==
Date	Time	Opponent	Rank	Site	TV	Result	Attendance
September 2	7:00 p.m.	at Baylor*		McLane Stadium; Waco, TX	FS2	W 48–45	45,784
September 9	6:00 p.m.	Morehead State*	No. 20	Williams Stadium; Lynchburg, VA	BSN, ESPN3	W 58–17	17,118
September 16	6:00 p.m.	Indiana State*	No. 19	Williams Stadium; Lynchburg, VA	BSN, ESPN3	W 42–41	16,060
September 23	7:00 p.m.	at No. 5 Jacksonville State*	No. 16	JSU Stadium; Jacksonville, AL	OVCDN	L 10–31	23,944
September 30	6:00 p.m.	Saint Francis (PA)*	No. 22	Williams Stadium; Lynchburg, VA	BSN, ESPN3	L 7–13	15,886
October 14	6:00 p.m.	Kennesaw State^{†}		Williams Stadium; Lynchburg, VA	ESPN3	L 28–42	17,726
October 21	1:00 p.m.	at Monmouth		Kessler Field; West Long Branch, NJ	ESPN3	L 39–56	4,235
October 28	12:00 p.m.	at Gardner–Webb		Ernest W. Spangler Stadium; Boiling Springs, NC	Stadium	W 33–17	3,850
November 4	3:30 p.m.	Duquesne*		Williams Stadium; Lynchburg, VA	BSN, ESPN3, MASN	W 27–24	14,634
November 11	3:30 p.m.	Presbyterian		Williams Stadium; Lynchburg, VA	CFDS	W 47–28	18,001
November 18	12:00 p.m.	at Charleston Southern		Buccaneer Field; Charleston, SC		L 19–20	3,345
*Non-conference game; ^{†}Homecoming; Rankings from STATS Poll released prior to the game; All times are in Eastern time

- Source: Schedule

== Rankings ==
Ranking movements Legend: ██ Increase in ranking ██ Decrease in ranking — = Not ranked RV = Received votes
	Week													
Poll	Pre	1	2	3	4	5	6	7	8	9	10	11	12	Final
STATS FCS	RV	20	19	16	22	RV	RV	RV	—	—	—	—	—	—
Coaches*	—	—	—	—	—	—	—	—	—	—	—	—	—	—

* Due to their transition to FBS, they are not eligible to be ranked in the FCS Coaches Poll.

== Game summaries ==
=== At Baylor ===
Liberty @ Baylor

Team	1	2	3	4	Total
• Flames	6	11	17	14	48
Bears	0	17	14	14	45

- Date: September 2
- Location: McLane Stadium
  Waco, TX
- Game start: 7:00 p.m.
- Elapsed time: 3:48
- Game attendance: 45,784
- Game weather: 92 °F (33 °C) • Fair Skies • SSE 5–10 MPH
- Referee: Dan Lewis
- TV announcers (FS2): Eric Collins, AJ Hawks and Danny Kanell

Scoring summary
1	11:27	Liberty	Alex Probert 27 yard field goal, Drive: 11 plays, 73 yards, 3:33	3–0
1	2:35	Liberty	Alex Probert 41 yard field goal, Drive: 10 plays, 35 yards, 2:24	6–0
2	13:59	Baylor	Denzel Mims 45 yard pass from Anu Solomon (Connor Martin kick), Drive: 9 plays, 75 yards, 3:36	6–7
2	11:38	Liberty	Antonio Gandy-Golden 40 yard pass from Stephen Calvert (Mitchell Lewis run for two-point conv.), Drive: 6 plays, 75 yards, 2:21	14–7
2	9:38	Baylor	JaMycal Hasty 14 yard run (Connor Martin kick), Drive: 6 plays, 75 yards, 2:00	14–14
2	5:17	Liberty	Alex Probert 33 yard field goal, Drive: 13 plays, 59 yards, 4:21	17–14
2	0:12	Baylor	Connor Martin 39 yard field goal, Drive: 14 plays, 68 yards, 5:05	17–17
3	13:53	Liberty	Chris Turner 32 yard interception return (Alex Probert kick), Drive: 3 plays, 8 yards, 1:07	24–17
3	13:31	Baylor	Chris Platt 20 yard pass from Anu Solomon (Connor Martin kick), Drive: 3 plays, 75 yards, 0:22	24–24
3	5:48	Liberty	Alex Probert 31 yard field goal, Drive: 9 plays, 65 yards, 2:48	27–24
3	5:37	Baylor	Chris Platt 75 yard pass from Anu Solomon (Connor Martin kick), Drive: 1 play, 75 yards, 0:11	27–31
3	0:24	Liberty	Antonio Gandy–Golden 13 yard pass from Stephen Calvert (Alex Probert kick), Drive: 15 plays, 73 yards, 5:13	34–31
4	12:11	Liberty	Stephen Calvert 8 yard run (Alex Probert kick), Drive: 7 plays, 44 yards, 2:27	41–31
4	10:39	Baylor	John Lovett 3 yard run (Connor Martin kick), Drive: 4 plays, 75 yards, 1:32	41–38
4	6:12	Liberty	Spencer Jones 26 yard pass from Stephen Calvert (Alex Probert kick), Drive: 11 plays, 65 yards, 4:27	48–38
4	5:00	Baylor	John Lovett 34 yard run (Connor Martin kick), Drive: 3 plays, 43 yards, 1:12	48–45

Statistics	LIB	BAY
First downs	31	22
Total yards	585	532
Rushing yards	138	254
Passing yards	447	278
Turnovers	0	2
Time of possession	38:16	21:44

Team	Category	Player	Statistics
Liberty	Passing	Stephen Calvert	44/60, 447 yards, 3 TD
Liberty	Rushing	Carrington Mosley	28 rushes, 122 yards
Liberty	Receiving	Antonio Gandy-Golden	13 receptions, 192 yards, 2 TD
Baylor	Passing	Anu Solomon	14/29, 278 yards, 3 TD, INT
Baylor	Rushing	Anu Solomon	6 rushes, 97 yards
Baylor	Receiving	Chris Platt	3 receptions, 102 yards, 2 TD

=== Morehead State ===
Morehead State @ Liberty

Team	1	2	3	4	Total
Eagles	0	10	7	0	17
• No. 20 Flames	24	21	7	6	58

- Date: September 9
- Location: Williams Stadium
  Lynchburg, VA
- Game start: 6:00 p.m.
- Elapsed time: 3:12
- Game attendance: 17,118
- Game weather: 71 °F (22 °C) • Partly Cloudy • NE 4 MPH
- Referee: Stuart Mullins
- TV announcers (BSN/ESPN3): Mike Tilley, Matt Warner and Rett McGibbon

Scoring summary
1	13:47	Liberty	B.J. Farrow 25 yard pass from Stephen Calvert (Alex Probert kick), Drive: 3 plays, 50 yards, 1:13	7–0
1	10:01	Liberty	Damian King 42 yard pass from Stephen Calvert (Alex Probert kick), Drive: 3 plays, 49 yards, 1:04	14–0
1	7:20	Liberty	Alex Probert 33 yard field goal, Drive: 4 plays, -1 yard, 0:37	17–0
1	2:41	Liberty	Antonio Gandy-Golden 10 yard pass from Stephen Calvert (Alex Probert kick), Drive: 8 plays, 62 yards, 2:16	24–0
2	14:50	Morehead State	Andrew Foster 53 yard field goal, Drive: 6 plays, 39 yards, 2:51	24–3
2	13:44	Liberty	B.J. Farrow 76 yard pass from Stephen Calvert (Alex Probert kick), Drive: 4 plays, 65 yards, 1:06	31–3
2	3:37	Liberty	Kentory Matthews 2 yard run (Alex Probert kick), Drive: 8 plays, 28 yards, 3:25	38–3
2	1:43	Morehead State	Jake Sutherland 11 yard pass from Lawson Page (Sam McDonogh kick), Drive: 5 plays, 75 yards, 1:54	38–10
2	0:24	Liberty	B.J. Farrow 45 yard pass from Stephen Calvert (Alex Probert kick), Drive: 4 plays, 77 yards, 1:07	45–10
3	9:02	Morehead State	Logan Holbrook 9 yard run (Sam McDonogh kick), Drive: 13 plays, 92 yards, 5:49	45–17
3	2:47	Liberty	Kentory Matthews 2 yard run (Alex Probert kick), Drive: 8 plays, 64 yards, 2:40	52–17
4	14:20	Liberty	Alex Probert 37 yard field goal, Drive: 6 plays, 14 yards, 2:06	55–17
4	9:03	Liberty	Alex Probert 38 yard field goal, Drive: 11 plays, 52 yards, 3:33	58–17

Statistics	MORE	LIB
First downs	16	24
Total yards	300	523
Rushing yards	64	196
Passing yards	236	327
Turnovers	1	2
Time of possession	33:31	26:29

Team	Category	Player	Statistics
Morehead State	Passing	Lawson Page	18/31, 187 yards, TD, INT
Morehead State	Rushing	Logan Holbrook	13 rushes, 44 yards, TD
Morehead State	Receiving	Jarin Higginbothom	2 receptions, 64 yards
Liberty	Passing	Stephen Calvert	13/21, 281 yards, 5 TD
Liberty	Rushing	Kentory Matthews	13 rushes, 103 yards, 2 TD
Liberty	Receiving	B. J. Farrow	6 receptions, 177 yards, 3 TD

=== Indiana State ===
Indiana State @ Liberty

Team	1	2	3	4	Total
Sycamores	7	17	14	3	41
• No. 19 Flames	14	14	14	0	42

- Date: September 16
- Location: Williams Stadium
  Lynchburg, VA
- Game start: 6:00 p.m.
- Elapsed time: 3:29
- Game attendance: 16,060
- Game weather: 79 °F (26 °C) • Cloudy • NE 5 MPH
- Referee: Jerry Magallanes
- TV announcers (BSN/ESPN3): Mike Tilley and Matt Warner

Scoring summary
1	11:35	Liberty	B.J. Farrow 3 yard pass from Stephen Calvert (Alex Probert kick), Drive: 4 plays, 30 yards, 0:41	7–0
1	9:27	Indiana State	Jaquan Keys 1 yard run (Jerry Nunez kick), Drive: 5 plays, 74 yards, 2:00	7–7
1	5:02	Liberty	Carrington Mosley 1 yard run (Alex Probert kick), Drive: 11 plays, 75 yards, 4:19	14–7
2	9:59	Liberty	Carrington Mosley 22 yard run (Alex Probert kick), Drive: 6 plays, 64 yards, 2:42	21–7
2	8:26	Indiana State	Jerry Nunez 43 yard field goal, Drive: 5 plays, 49 yards, 1:33	21–10
2	4:35	Indiana State	Jacquet McClendon 31 yard pass from Jeremy Patterson (Jerry Nunez kick), Drive: 5 plays, 52 yards, 2:25	21–17
2	3:18	Liberty	Antonio Gandy-Golden 13 yard pass from Stephen Calvert (Alex Probert kick), Drive: 5 plays, 75 yards, 1:17	28–17
2	2:02	Indiana State	Bob Pugh 64 yard pass from Cade Sparks (Jerry Nunez kick), Drive: 3 plays, 75 yards, 1:16	28–24
3	11:31	Indiana State	Lemonte Booker 1 yard run (Jerry Nunez kick), Drive: 8 plays, 65 yards, 3:29	28–31
3	9:09	Liberty	Damian King 32 yard pass from Stephen Calvert (Alex Probert kick), Drive: 5 plays, 93 yards, 2:17	35–31
3	5:22	Liberty	B.J. Farrow 6 yard pass from Stephen Calvert (Alex Probert kick), Drive: 7 plays, 47 yards, 2:35	42–31
3	1:58	Indiana State	Bob Pugh 31 yard pass from Cade Sparks (Jerry Nunez kick), Drive: 6 plays, 75 yards, 3:24	42–38
4	11:46	Indiana State	Jerry Nunez 43 yard field goal, Drive: 4 plays, 2 yards, 1:25	42–41

Statistics	INST	LIB
First downs	21	28
Total yards	543	500
Rushing yards	107	121
Passing yards	436	379
Turnovers	2	1
Time of possession	31:28	28:32

Team	Category	Player	Statistics
Indiana State	Passing	Cade Sparks	22/36, 405 yards, 2 TD, INT
Indiana State	Rushing	Lemonte Booker	26 rushes, 95 yards, TD
Indiana State	Receiving	Bob Pugh	8 receptions, 260 yards, 2 TD
Liberty	Passing	Stephen Calvert	30/42, 379 yards, 4 TD, INT
Liberty	Rushing	Carrington Mosley	22 rushes, 102 yards, 2 TD
Liberty	Receiving	Antonio Gandy-Golden	7 receptions, 171 yards, TD

=== At Jacksonville State ===
Liberty @ Jacksonville State

Team	1	2	3	4	Total
No. 16 Flames	3	0	7	0	10
• No. 5 Gamecocks	0	10	14	7	31

- Date: September 23
- Location: JSU Stadium
  Jacksonville, AL
- Game start: 7:00 p.m.
- Elapsed time: 2:57
- Game attendance: 23,944
- Game weather: 80 °F (27 °C) • Clear • ENE 3 MPH
- Referee: Dustin Whitehead
- TV announcers (OVCDN): Mickey Shadrix and Butch Barker

Scoring summary
1	1:57	Liberty	Alex Probert 28 yard field goal, Drive: 12 plays, 57 yards, 6:25	3–0
2	11:02	Jacksonville State	Trae Barry 80 yard pass from Bryant Horn (Cade Stinnett kick), Drive: 1 play, 80 yards, 0:12	3–7
2	1:20	Jacksonville State	Cade Stinnett 49 yard field goal, Drive: 6 plays, 16 yards, 2:21	3–10
3	11:59	Jacksonville State	Roc Thomas 11 yard run (Cade Stinnett kick), Drive: 8 plays, 81 yards, 2:56	3–17
3	8:31	Jacksonville State	Kendrick Doss 15 yard run (Cade Stinnett kick), Drive: 1 play, 15 yards, 0:06	3–24
3	8:08	Liberty	B.J. Farrow 65 yard pass from Stephen Calvert (Alex Probert kick), Drive: 3 plays, 65 yards, 0:23	10–24
4	5:04	Jacksonville State	Roc Thomas 13 yard run (Cade Stinnett kick), Drive: 9 plays, 90 yards, 5:20	10–31

Statistics	LIB	JVST
First downs	17	19
Total yards	316	385
Rushing yards	31	140
Passing yards	285	245
Turnovers	1	1
Time of possession	30:17	29:43

Team	Category	Player	Statistics
Liberty	Passing	Stephen Calvert	22/47, 285 yards, TD, INT
Liberty	Rushing	Carrington Mosley	14 rushes, 36 yards
Liberty	Receiving	Antonio Gandy-Golden	7 receptions, 126 yards
Jacksonville State	Passing	Bryant Horn	9/19, 181 yards, TD, INT
Jacksonville State	Rushing	Roc Thomas	18 rushes, 87 yards, 2 TD
Jacksonville State	Receiving	Trae Berry	1 reception, 80 yards, TD

=== Saint Francis (PA) ===
Saint Francis (PA) @ Liberty

Team	1	2	3	4	Total
• Red Flash	0	6	7	0	13
No. 22 Flames	0	0	0	7	7

- Date: September 30
- Location: Williams Stadium
  Lynchburg, VA
- Game start: 6:00 p.m.
- Elapsed time: 2:59
- Game attendance: 15,886
- Game weather: 70 °F (21 °C) • Clear • NE 11 MPH
- Referee: Jeff Pumphrey
- TV announcers (BSN/ESPN3): Mike Tilley, Matt Warner and Rett McGibbon

Scoring summary
2	0:18	St. Francis (PA)	Matt Valenzuela 9 yard pass from Bear Fenimore (Eric Bofenkamp kick blocked), Drive: 4 plays, 19 yards, 1:30	0–6
3	4:39	St. Francis (PA)	Kamron Lewis 23 yard pass from Bear Fenimore (Eric Bofenkamp kick), Drive: 5 plays, 58 yards, 2:32	0–13
4	2:35	Liberty	Cephas Reddick 32 yard pass from Stephen Calvert (Alex Probert kick), Drive: 7 plays, 77 yards, 1:27	7–13

Statistics	SFU	LIB
First downs	14	15
Total yards	275	338
Rushing yards	92	119
Passing yards	183	219
Turnovers	0	4
Time of possession	35:33	24:27

Team	Category	Player	Statistics
Saint Francis (PA)	Passing	Bear Fenimore	23/35, 183 yards, 2 TD
Saint Francis (PA)	Rushing	Jymere Jordan-Toney	22 rushes, 105 yards
Saint Francis (PA)	Receiving	Kamron Lewis	10 receptions, 95 yards, TD
Liberty	Passing	Stephen Calvert	21/42, 219 yards, TD, 2 INT
Liberty	Rushing	Kentory Matthews	5 rushes, 50 yards
Liberty	Receiving	Cephas Reddick	3 receptions, 70 yards, TD

=== Kennesaw State ===
Kennesaw State @ Liberty

Team	1	2	3	4	Total
• Owls	7	21	7	7	42
Flames	7	0	7	14	28

- Date: October 14
- Location: Williams Stadium
  Lynchburg, VA
- Game start: 6:00 p.m.
- Elapsed time: 2:54
- Game attendance: 17,726
- Game weather: 73 °F (23 °C) • Sunny • SSE 3 MPH
- Referee: Stuart Mullins
- Television network: ESPN3

Scoring summary
1	–
2	–
3	–
4	–

Statistics	KENN	LIB
First downs	26	20
Total yards	507	337
Rushing yards	498	103
Passing yards	9	234
Turnovers	1	2
Time of possession	38:38	21:22

Team	Category	Player	Statistics
Kennesaw State	Passing	Chandler Burks	2/7, 9 yards, TD, INT
Kennesaw State	Rushing	Shaquil Terry	9 rushes, 126 yards, TD
Kennesaw State	Receiving	Justin Sumpter	2 receptions, 9 yards, TD
Liberty	Passing	Stephen Calvert	19/26, 234 yards, 2 TD, INT
Liberty	Rushing	Carrington Mosley	14 rushes, 75 yards, 2 TD
Liberty	Receiving	Antonio Gandy-Golden	4 receptions, 89 yards, TD

=== At Monmouth ===
Liberty @ Monmouth

Team	1	2	3	4	Total
Flames	7	12	20	0	39
• Hawks	21	14	14	7	56

- Date: October 21
- Location: Kessler Field
  West Long Branch, NJ
- Game start: 1:00 p.m.
- Game attendance: 4,235

Scoring summary
1	–
2	–
3	–
4	–

Statistics	LIB	MON
First downs	24	26
Total yards	529	608
Rushing yards	121	364
Passing yards	408	244
Turnovers	0	2
Time of possession	26:32	33:28

Team	Category	Player	Statistics
Liberty	Passing	Stephen Calvert	25/50, 408 yards, 2 TD
Liberty	Rushing	Carrington Mosley	10 rushes, 71 yards
Liberty	Receiving	Antonio Gandy-Golden	9 receptions, 127 yards, 2 TD
Monmouth	Passing	Kenji Bahar	14/25, 244 yards, 2 TD, INT
Monmouth	Rushing	Eric Zokouri	18 rushes, 193 yards, 2 TD
Monmouth	Receiving	Reggie White Jr.	10 receptions, 187 yards, 2 TD

=== At Gardner–Webb ===
Liberty @ Gardner–Webb

Team	1	2	3	4	Total
• Flames	6	6	7	14	33
Runnin' Bulldogs	0	7	3	7	17

- Date: October 28
- Location: Ernest W. Spangler Stadium
  Boiling Springs, NC
- Game start: 12:00 p.m. EDT
- Game attendance: 3,850

Scoring summary
1	–
2	–
3	–
4	–

Statistics	LIB	WEBB
First downs	22	24
Total yards	458	483
Rushing yards	125	277
Passing yards	333	206
Turnovers	1	3
Time of possession	26:56	33:04

Team	Category	Player	Statistics
Liberty	Passing	Stephen Calvert	21/34, 333 yards, 2 TD
Liberty	Rushing	Carrington Mosley	20 rushes, 123 yards, 2 TD
Liberty	Receiving	Antonio Gandy-Golden	4 receptions, 123 yards, TD
Gardner–Webb	Passing	Tyrell Maxwell	13/32, 206 yards, TD, 3 INT
Gardner–Webb	Rushing	Jayln Cagle	24 rushes, 179 yards, TD
Gardner–Webb	Receiving	Brody Rollins	3 receptions, 61 yards, TD

=== Duquesne ===
Duquesne @ Liberty

Team	1	2	3	4	Total
Dukes	14	10	0	0	24
• Flames	7	3	7	10	27

- Date: November 4
- Location: Williams Stadium
  Lynchburg, VA
- Game start: 3:30 p.m.
- Game attendance: 14,634

Scoring summary
1	–
2	–
3	–
4	–

Statistics	DUQ	LIB
First downs	15	29
Total yards	434	421
Rushing yards	295	210
Passing yards	139	211
Turnovers	4	0
Time of possession	25:23	34:37

Team	Category	Player	Statistics
Duquesne	Passing	Tommy Stuart	13/23, 139 yards, TD, 2 INT
Duquesne	Rushing	A. J. Hines	25 rushes, 253 yards, 2 TD
Duquesne	Receiving	Chavas Rawlins	5 receptions, 51 yards, TD
Liberty	Passing	Stephen Calvert	23/46, 211 yards, TD
Liberty	Rushing	Carrington Mosley	30 rushes, 151 yards, 2 TD
Liberty	Receiving	Antonio Gandy-Golden	8 receptions, 65 yards

=== Presbyterian ===
Presbyterian @ Liberty

Team	1	2	3	4	Total
Blue Hose	7	0	14	7	28
• Flames	24	9	7	7	47

- Date: November 11
- Location: Williams Stadium
  Lynchburg, VA
- Game start: 3:30 p.m.
- Game attendance: 18,001

Scoring summary
1	–
2	–
3	–
4	–

Statistics	PRES	LIB
First downs	16	30
Total yards	452	628
Rushing yards	155	317
Passing yards	297	311
Turnovers	0	2
Time of possession	29:28	30:32

Team	Category	Player	Statistics
Presbyterian	Passing	Will Brock	16/33, 297 yards, 2 TD
Presbyterian	Rushing	C. J. Marable	23 rushes, 126 yards
Presbyterian	Receiving	Darquez Watson	2 receptions, 67 yards
Liberty	Passing	Stephen Calvert	14/26, 311 yards, 3 TD
Liberty	Rushing	Carrington Mosley	27 rushes, 149 yards, TD
Liberty	Receiving	Cephas Reddick	4 receptions, 125 yards, 2 TD

=== At Charleston Southern ===
Liberty @ Charleston Southern

Team	1	2	3	4	Total
Flames	0	7	9	3	19
• Buccaneers	0	7	0	13	20

- Date: November 17
- Location: Buccaneer Field
  Charleston, SC
- Game start: Noon
- Game attendance: 3,345

Scoring summary
1	–
2	–
3	–
4	–

Statistics	LIB	CHSO
First downs	19	18
Total yards	306	415
Rushing yards	51	229
Passing yards	255	186
Turnovers	1	1
Time of possession	24:46	35:14

Team	Category	Player	Statistics
Liberty	Passing	Stephen Calvert	25/44, 255 yards, 2 TD, INT
Liberty	Rushing	Frankie Hickson	11 rushes, 33 yards
Liberty	Receiving	Antonio Gandy-Golden	10 receptions, 113 yards, 2 TD
Charleston Southern	Passing	London Johnson	13/27, 186 yards
Charleston Southern	Rushing	Noah Shuler	13 rushes, 84 yards, TD
Charleston Southern	Receiving	Kameron Brown	4 receptions, 106 yards
