= Parkwood High School =

American public school in North Carolina

Location
- 3220 Parkwood School Road; Monroe, North Carolina 28112; United States; 34°54′06″N 80°37′50″W

Information
- Type: Public
- Established: 1961 (65 years ago)
- CEEB code: 342662
- Principal: Tracy Strickland
- Teaching staff: 64.08 (FTE)
- Enrollment: 1,055 (2023-2024)
- Student to teacher ratio: 16.46
- Schedule: Block schedule
- Colors: Blue, gray, and white
- Athletics conference: Southern Carolina 3A
- Team name: Wolf Pack
- Website: pwhs.ucpsnc.org

Parkwood High School is located in Monroe, North Carolina, United States. It opened in August 1961. It is part of the Union County Public Schools district. It is adjacent to Parkwood Middle School, with feeder elementary schools Prospect Elementary School, Waxhaw Elementary School, and Western Union Elementary School. The principal is Tracy Strickland.

== Facilities ==
Parkwood High School's gym was opened on August 10, 2007. Due to the overcrowding of the towns and schools, North Carolina has added trailers to Parkwood High School, as well as to many other schools in Union County.

Parkwood High School has a newspaper called the Parkwood Blueprint. It also has a yearly literary magazine.

== Air Force Junior ROTC ==
The Air Force Junior ROTC, also known as the Aerospace Science program, was created in 2007. It is designed as a four-year program, but students are allowed to take any number of years. The classes are structured as normal classes, but there is an extra emphasis on leadership activities, and some cadet activities are also introduced.

== Controversies ==
In 2010, a female teacher of Spanish was arrested and accused of having sex with a male student.

On July 7, 2020, the Union County Board of Education voted 6–2 to change the school team names from the Rebels. Wolf Pack was chosen as the new team name for the school.

== Notable alumni ==
- Julianna Cannamela, artistic gymnast
- Daniel Harvey, professional soccer player
- Carroll McCray, college football coach
- Nick Saldiveri, NFL offensive tackle
- John Tillman, triple jumper who represented the United States at the 1992 Summer Olympics
