= Nick Saldiveri =

American football player (born 2000)

No. 64 – New Orleans Saints
- Position: Guard
- Roster status: Injured reserve

Personal information
- Born: August 14, 2000 (age 26); Waxhaw, North Carolina, U.S.
- Listed height: 6 ft 6 in (1.98 m)
- Listed weight: 316 lb (143 kg)

Career information
- High school: Parkwood (Monroe, North Carolina)
- College: Old Dominion (2018–2022)
- NFL draft: 2023: 4th round, 103rd overall pick

Career history
- New Orleans Saints (2023–present)

Awards and highlights
- Second-team All-Sun Belt (2022)

Career NFL statistics as of 2024
- Games played: 15
- Games started: 6
- Stats at Pro Football Reference

Nicholas Saldiveri (sal-də-vair-ee; born August 14, 2000) is an American professional football guard for the New Orleans Saints of the National Football League (NFL). He played college football for the Old Dominion Monarchs and was selected by the Saints in the fourth round (103rd overall) of the 2023 NFL draft.

== Early life ==
Saldiveri was born on August 14, 2000, in Waxhaw, North Carolina. His father died when he was two and his mother had to work multiple jobs to support him and his half-brother. Originally from South Florida, his mother moved the family to North Carolina when he was seven. He did not play football until he was 11 as his size and height were too great for Pop Warner leagues. He began playing the sport in middle school before attending Parkwood High School in Monroe, North Carolina.

In addition to football at Parkwood, Saldiveri also played basketball and performed in discus and shot put. Despite being named all-conference, he was ranked a two-star prospect and did not receive many offers. He was noticed by an assistant coach at Old Dominion University and was given a scholarship offer, which he accepted.

== College career ==
Saldiveri redshirted as a freshman at Old Dominion in 2018, only appearing in three games. He appeared on a total of 85 snaps switching between left and right tackle, not allowing a single quarterback hurry. He became a full-time starter the following year, appearing in 11 games while allowing 22 hurries, two quarterback hits and four sacks. The 2020 season was cancelled due to the COVID-19 pandemic. Saldiveri returned in 2021 and started all 13 games at right tackle, being named honorable mention all-Sun Belt Conference while allowing 13 hurries, two hits and five sacks. He also helped lead the Monarchs to a bowl game appearance in the Myrtle Beach Bowl, after closing out the regular season with 5 straight wins. Saldiveri started 11 games in 2022, 10 at right tackle and the other at right guard, allowing 16 hurries, three hits and no sacks while earning second-team all-conference honors. He was also named a team captain by his peers. Saldiveri played in the 2023 Senior Bowl after the season.

== Professional career ==
Saldiveri was a top-ten performer at his position class in the 2023 NFL Combine in the vertical jump, broad jump and 20-yard shuttle drills.

Pre-draft measurables
Height	Weight	Arm length	Hand span	Wingspan	40-yard dash	10-yard split	20-yard split	20-yard shuttle	Vertical jump	Broad jump	Bench press
6 ft 6 1/4 in (1.99 m)	318 lb (144 kg)	33 1/4 in (0.84 m)	10 1/4 in (0.26 m)	6 ft 9 1/4 in (2.06 m)	5.21 s	1.80 s	2.95 s	4.69 s	31.0 in (0.79 m)	9 ft 3 in (2.82 m)	24 reps
All values from the NFL Combine

Saldiveri was selected by the New Orleans Saints in the fourth round (103rd overall) of the 2023 NFL draft. As a rookie, he appeared in four games.

In training camp in 2025, Saldiveri suffered a knee injury and was placed on season-ending injured reserve on August 2, 2025.

Saldiveri was placed placed on season-ending injured reserve on May 13, 2026.
