= 2017 Monmouth Hawks football team =

American college football season

2017 Monmouth Hawks football
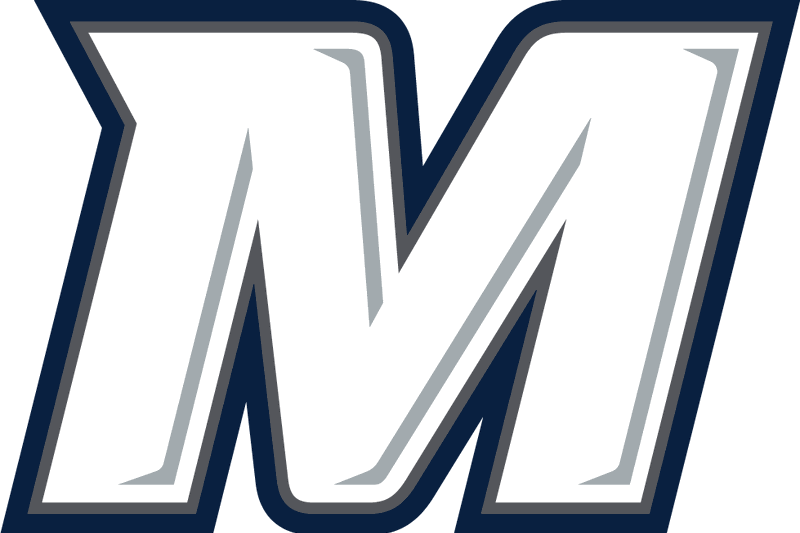

NCAA Division I First Round, L 7–46 vs. Northern Iowa
- Conference: Big South Conference
- Record: 9–3 (4–1 Big South)
- Head coach: Kevin Callahan (25th season)
- Offensive coordinator: Kevin Morris (3rd season)
- Offensive scheme: Pro-style
- Defensive coordinator: Andy Bobik (24th season)
- Base defense: 4–3
- Home stadium: Kessler Field

2017 Big South Conference football standings
	Conf.			Overall
Team	W		L	W		L
No. 8 Kennesaw State $^	5	–	0	12	–	2
Monmouth ^	4	–	1	9	–	3
Charleston Southern	3	–	2	6	–	5
Liberty *	2	–	3	6	–	5
Presbyterian	1	–	4	4	–	7
Gardner–Webb	0	–	5	1	–	10
$ – Conference champion; ^ – FCS playoff participant; * Liberty ineligible for postseason due to FBS transition; Rankings from STATS Poll

The 2017 Monmouth Hawks football team represented Monmouth University in the 2017 NCAA Division I FCS football season as a member of the Big South Conference. They were led by 25th-year head coach Kevin Callahan and played their home games at Kessler Field in West Long Branch, New Jersey. Monmouth finished the season 9–3 overall and 4–1 in Big South play to place in second. The Hawks received an at-large bid to the FCS Playoffs marking the school's first playoff berth. There they lost to Northern Iowa in the first round.

== Schedule ==
Date	Time	Opponent	Site	TV	Result	Attendance
September 2	3:00 p.m.	Lafayette*	Kessler Field; West Long Branch, NJ	ESPN3	W 31–12	3,898
September 9	1:00 p.m.	No. 19 Lehigh*	Kessler Field; West Long Branch, NJ	ESPN3	W 46–27	2,839
September 16	7:00 p.m.	at Albany*	Bob Ford Field at Tom & Mary Casey Stadium; Albany, NY	ESPN3	L 14–28	6,384
September 23	2:00 p.m.	at Hampton*	Armstrong Stadium; Hampton, VA	PTV	W 30–23 ^{OT}	5,123
September 30	6:00 p.m.	at Bucknell*	Christy Mathewson–Memorial Stadium; Lewisburg, PA	Stadium	W 35–13	1,942
October 7	1:00 p.m.	at Holy Cross*	Fitton Field; Worcester, MA	Stadium	W 48–36	4,484
October 21	1:00 p.m.	Liberty^{†}	Kessler Field; West Long Branch, NJ	ESPN3	W 56–39	4,235
October 28	6:00 p.m.	at Charleston Southern	Buccaneer Field; Charleston, SC	ESPN3	W 23–20	1,825
November 4	1:00 p.m.	Presbyterian	Kessler Field; West Long Branch, NJ	ESPN3	W 42–21	3,159
November 11	12:00 p.m.	Gardner–Webb	Kessler Field; West Long Branch, NJ	Stadium	W 41–14	2,278
November 18	2:00 p.m.	at No. 22 Kennesaw State	Fifth Third Bank Stadium; Kennesaw, GA	ESPN3	L 21–52	6,808
November 25	5:00 p.m.	at No. 20 Northern Iowa*	UNI-Dome; Cedar Falls, IA (NCAA Division I First Round)	ESPN3	L 7–46	4,095
*Non-conference game; ^{†}Homecoming; Rankings from STATS Poll released prior to the game; All times are in Eastern time

== Game summaries ==
=== Lafayette ===
	1	2	3	4	Total
Leopards	0	0	6	6	12
Hawks	0	7	14	10	31

=== Lehigh ===
	1	2	3	4	Total
No. 19 Mountain Hawks	14	7	6	0	27
Hawks	14	6	13	13	46

=== At Albany ===
	1	2	3	4	Total
Hawks	0	7	7	0	14
Great Danes	13	9	0	6	28

=== At Hampton ===
	1	2	3	4	OT	Total
Hawks	0	14	9	0	7	30
Pirates	13	3	0	7	0	23

=== At Bucknell ===
	1	2	3	4	Total
Hawks	7	14	14	0	35
Bison	0	6	0	7	13

=== At Holy Cross ===
	1	2	3	4	Total
Hawks	0	21	20	7	48
Crusaders	3	14	0	19	36

=== Liberty ===
	1	2	3	4	Total
Flames	7	12	20	0	39
Hawks	21	14	14	7	56

=== At Charleston Southern ===
	1	2	3	4	Total
Hawks	0	16	7	0	23
Buccaneers	0	0	7	13	20

=== Presbyterian ===
	1	2	3	4	Total
Blue Hose	7	7	7	0	21
Hawks	7	7	21	7	42

=== Gardner–Webb ===
	1	2	3	4	Total
Runnin' Bulldogs	0	7	0	7	14
Hawks	20	7	7	7	41

=== At Kennesaw State ===
	1	2	3	4	Total
Hawks	7	14	0	0	21
No. 21 Owls	14	21	10	7	52

== FCS Playoffs ==
=== At Northern Iowa–First Round ===
	1	2	3	4	Total
Hawks	0	0	0	7	7
No. 20 Panthers	14	19	13	0	46

== Ranking movements ==
Ranking movements Legend: ██ Increase in ranking ██ Decrease in ranking — = Not ranked RV = Received votes
	Week													
Poll	Pre	1	2	3	4	5	6	7	8	9	10	11	12	Final
STATS FCS	—	—	—	RV	RV	RV	RV	RV	RV	RV	RV	RV	RV	RV
Coaches	—	—	—	—	RV	RV	RV	RV	RV	24	22	22	23	RV
