= Dan Harvey (historian) =

Irish former soldier and military historian

- Born: Daniel Charles Harvey; 16 June 1959 (age 65); Blackrock, Cork, Ireland
- Education: Christian Brothers College, Cork; NUI Galway (BComm); University College Cork (MA); Maynooth University (MA)
- Occupation(s): Military officer, historian, author, museum curator

Dan Harvey (born 16 June 1959) is an Irish military historian, author, and retired Lieutenant Colonel in the Irish Defence Forces.

== Biography ==
Born and raised in Blackrock in County Cork, Harvey served in the Irish Defence Forces from 1978 to 2017, retiring with the rank of Lieutenant Colonel. He served in Ireland during the Troubles, mainly with the Southern Brigade, and saw active service overseas as a peacekeeper in Central Africa, Lebanon, Kosovo, the South Caucasus, and Vienna. As an author, Harvey has written extensively about the history of the Defence Forces, the Troubles, and the involvement of Irish men and women in significant battles such as Waterloo and D-Day. He now lives in Paris.

While serving in the Defence Forces, Harvey also worked as the museum curator for several award-winning military exhibitions in Ireland, including at Collins Barracks and the National Museum of Ireland. He is a longtime contributor to An Cosantóir, the magazine of the Irish Defence Forces. He was a military advisor on the 2006 Irish war drama film The Wind that Shakes the Barley.

Harvey is the nephew of former Taoiseach Jack Lynch.

== Bibliography ==
- The Barracks: A History of Victoria/Collins Barracks, Cork, Mercier Publishing 1997 (co-authored with Gerry White). ISBN 9781856351942
- Peacekeepers: Irish Soldiers in the Lebanon, Merlin Press 2001. ISBN 9781903582138
- Peace Enforcers, Book Republic 2010. ISBN 9781907221057
- "A” Company Action: The Battle of the Tunnel, Book Republic 2011. ISBN 9781908518101
- Attack on At Tiri: Force Met with Force, Maverick House 2014. ISBN 9781908518187
- Soldiers of the Short Grass: A History of the Curragh Camp, Irish Academic Press/Merrion Press 2016. ISBN 9781785371264
- A Bloody Day: The Irish at Waterloo, Irish Academic Press/Merrion Press 2017. ISBN 9781785370618
- A Bloody Night: The Irish at Rorke’s Drift, Irish Academic Press/Merrion Press 2017. ISBN 9781785371295
- Into Action: Irish Peacekeepers Under Fire 1960-2014, Merrion Press 2017. ISBN 9781785371110
- Soldiering Against Subversion, Merrion Press 2018. ISBN 9781785371851
- A Bloody Dawn: The Irish at D-Day, Merrion Press 2019. ISBN 9781785372414
- A Bloody Week: The Irish at Arnhem, Merrion Press 2019. ISBN 9781785372735
- A Bloody Victory: The Irish at War's End, Europe 1945, Merrion Press 2020. ISBN 9781785373336
- A Bloody Summer: The Irish at the Battle of Britain, Merrion Press, 2020. ISBN 9781785373251
- Missing in the Iron Triangle: The Search for Private Kevin Joyce South Lebanon (1981-2021), H-Books Cork Concepts Ltd, 2021. ISBN 9781916886902
