= Tommy Spangler =

American football player and coach (born 1961)

Current position
- Title: Special teams coordinator safeties coach
- Team: Furman
- Conference: SoCon

Biographical details
- Born: August 10, 1961 (age 65)

Playing career
- 1979–1982: Georgia
- Position: Defensive back

Coaching career (HC unless noted)
- 1985–1986: Georgia (GA)
- 1987–1989: Georgia Southern (DB)
- 1990–1991: Georgia Southern (co-DC)
- 1992–1996: Georgia Southern (DC)
- 1997–2000: Presbyterian (AHC/DC)
- 2001–2006: Presbyterian
- 2007–2012: Louisiana Tech (DC)
- 2013–2016: Presbyterian (DC)
- 2017–2020: Presbyterian
- 2022–2023: Furman (ST/CB)
- 2024–present: Furman (ST/S)

Head coaching record
- Overall: 50–49
- Tournaments: 0–1 (NCAA D-II playoffs)

Accomplishments and honors

Championships
- 1 SAC (2005)

Awards
- SoCon Defensive Coach of the Year (1993); SAC Coach of the Year (2005); AFCA Region 2 Coach of the Year (2005)

Tommy Spangler (born August 10, 1961) is an American college football coach. He is currently the special teams coordinator and safeties coach at Furman. He was the head coach of the Presbyterian Blue Hose football team at Presbyterian College, a position he held from 2001 to 2006 and reprised from 2017 to 2020.

== Head coaching record ==
Year	Team	Overall	Conference	Standing	Bowl/playoffs
Presbyterian Blue Hose (South Atlantic Conference) (2001–2006)
2001	Presbyterian	7–4	5–2	T–2nd	
2002	Presbyterian	8–3	5–2	3rd	
2003	Presbyterian	4–6	2–5	T–5th	
2004	Presbyterian	6–5	4–3	T–2nd	
2005	Presbyterian	10–2	7–0	1st	L NCAA Division II Second Round
2006	Presbyterian	7–4	5–2	T–2nd	
Presbyterian Blue Hose (Big South Conference) (2017–2019)
2017	Presbyterian	4–7	1–4	5th	
2018	Presbyterian	2–8	0–5	6th	
2019	Presbyterian	2–10	1–5	T–5th	
Presbyterian Blue Hose (Pioneer Football League) (2020)
2020–21	Presbyterian	4–3	4–2	T–2nd	
Presbyterian:		54–52	34–30		
Total:		54–52			
National championship Conference title Conference division title or championship game berth
