= Mark Tucker (American football coach) =

American football coach

Biographical details
- Born: 1962 or 1963 (age 63–64)

Playing career
- 1982–1986: East Tennessee State
- Position: Quarterback

Coaching career (HC unless noted)
- 1987: East Tennessee State (GA/WR)
- 1988: The Citadel (assistant)
- 1989: Hargrave Military Academy (VA)
- 1990–1991: Williamsburg Academy (SC)
- 1992–1995: The Citadel (RB)
- 1996: The Citadel (OC)
- 1997–1998: East Tennessee State (RB)
- 2002–2003: East Tennessee State (TE)
- 2004: East Tennessee State (OL)
- 2013–2016: Charleston Southern (QB)
- 2017–2018: Charleston Southern

Head coaching record
- Overall: 11–11 (college)

Mark Tucker (born c. 1962) is an American former football. He served as the head football coach at Charleston Southern University from 2017 to 2018. Tucker was named head coach in 2017. He resigned from the position in December 2018, posting an overall record of 11–11 as head coach.

== Head coaching record ==
=== College ===
Year	Team	Overall	Conference	Standing	Bowl/playoffs
Charleston Southern Buccaneers (Big South Conference) (2017–2018)
2017	Charleston Southern	6–5	3–2	3rd	
2018	Charleston Southern	5–6	3–2	3rd	
Charleston Southern:		11–11	6–4		
Total:		11–11			
