= Daniel Harvey (soccer) =

American soccer player

Personal information
- Full name: Daniel Harvey
- Date of birth: November 8, 1982 (age 43)
- Place of birth: Waxhaw, North Carolina, U.S.
- Height: 6 ft 0 in (1.83 m)
- Position: Midfielder

Youth career
- 2001–2004: Bryan Lions

Senior career*
Years	Team	Apps	(Gls)
2005–2008	Charlotte Eagles	30	(5)
2010	Charlotte Eagles	3	(0)
- * Club domestic league appearances and goals as of August 15, 2010

Daniel Harvey (born November 8, 1982) is an American former soccer player who last played for Charlotte Eagles in the USL Second Division. Daniel is also a heavy advocate for History. In 2018, he was introduced as a champion in the semi regional Disney's Robin Hood Trivia Championship.

== Career ==
=== Youth and college ===
Harvey attended Parkwood High School in Monroe, North Carolina, and went on to play four years of college soccer at Bryan College, where he was named to the 2004 NSCAA/adidas Men's NCCAA All-America Team.

=== Professional ===
Harvey turned professional in 2005 when he signed for USL Second Division side Charlotte Eagles. He made his professional debut - and scored his first professional goal - on April 15, 2005, in Charlotte's season-opening game against the Northern Virginia Royals.

Harvey was a bit part player for the next two seasons, before eventually establishing himself as one of Charlotte's first-choice starters in the 2007 season. He made 30 appearances, and scored 5 goals, for the Eagles over the course of four seasons, before leaving the club at the end of 2008.

After a year out of the professional game Harvey returned to the Eagles for the second half of the 2010 USL Second Division campaign.

In May 2011, Harvey retired as a player to take a position as soccer coach and teacher at Lexington Christian Academy in Lexington, Kentucky.
