= Carroll McCray =

American football player and coach (born 1962)

Current position
- Title: Director of player development
- Team: Virginia
- Conference: ACC

Biographical details
- Born: February 4, 1962 (age 64); Monroe, North Carolina, U.S.

Playing career
- 1979–1982: Gardner–Webb
- Position: Offensive lineman

Coaching career (HC unless noted)
- 1984: Appalachian State (GA)
- 1986–1988: Appalachian State (ILB)
- 1989–1993: South Carolina (assistant)
- 1994–2000: Samford (OL)
- 2001–2002: Mississippi State (OL)
- 2003–2006: Austin Peay
- 2007–2010: Furman (OL)
- 2011: Mercer (OL)
- 2012: North Greenville
- 2013–2019: Gardner–Webb
- 2021: North Greenville (AHC/OL)

Administrative career (AD unless noted)
- 2022–present: Virginia (DPP)

Head coaching record
- Overall: 43–92

Carroll McCray (born February 4, 1962) is an American football coach. He was the head football coach at Gardner–Webb University from 2013 to 2019. McCray was the head football coach at Austin Peay State University from 2003 to 2006 and North Greenville University in 2012.

After serving as an assistant coach at various schools for nearly two decades, on January 21, 2003, McCray was hired as the head coach at Austin Peay State University. On February 19, 2007, he resigned as the Governors' head coach and days later was introduced as the new offensive line coach at Furman. During his four-year tenure with the Governors, McCray had an overall record of 11 wins and 33 losses (11–33).

McCray stayed at Furman through the 2010 season, and followed Bobby Lamb to Mercer to serve as offensive line coach with the Bears for the 2011 season. On January 18, 2012, McCray was hired by North Greenville to succeed Jamey Chadwell as the head coach of the Crusaders. He was hired in January 2013 to serve as head coach of his alma mater, Gardner–Webb University after his only season at North Greenville. He was then fired from Gardner–Webb on November 24, 2019. He finished with a record of 27 wins and 53 losses (27–53).

== Head coaching record ==
Year	Team	Overall	Conference	Standing	Bowl/playoffs
Austin Peay Governors (Pioneer Football League) (2003–2005)
2003	Austin Peay	4–7	1–2	T–2nd (South)	
2004	Austin Peay	2–9	1–2	T–2nd (South)	
2005	Austin Peay	2–9	0–3	4th (South)	
Austin Peay Governors (NCAA Division I FCS independent) (2006)
2006	Austin Peay	3–8			
Austin Peay:		11–33			
North Greenville Crusaders (NCAA Division II independent) (2012)
2012	North Greenville	5–6			
North Greenville:		5–6			
Gardner–Webb Runnin' Bulldogs (Big South Conference) (2013–2019)
2013	Gardner–Webb	7–5	2–3	4th	
2014	Gardner–Webb	4–8	0–5	6th	
2015	Gardner–Webb	4–7	2–4	T–5th	
2016	Gardner–Webb	5–6	3–2	T–3rd	
2017	Gardner–Webb	1–10	0–5	6th	
2018	Gardner–Webb	3–8	2–3	4th	
2019	Gardner–Webb	3–9	1–5	T–5th	
Gardner–Webb:		27–53	10–27		
Total:		43–92			
