= Williams Stadium =

Stadium in Virginia, USA

Arthur L. Williams Stadium
- "The Bill"
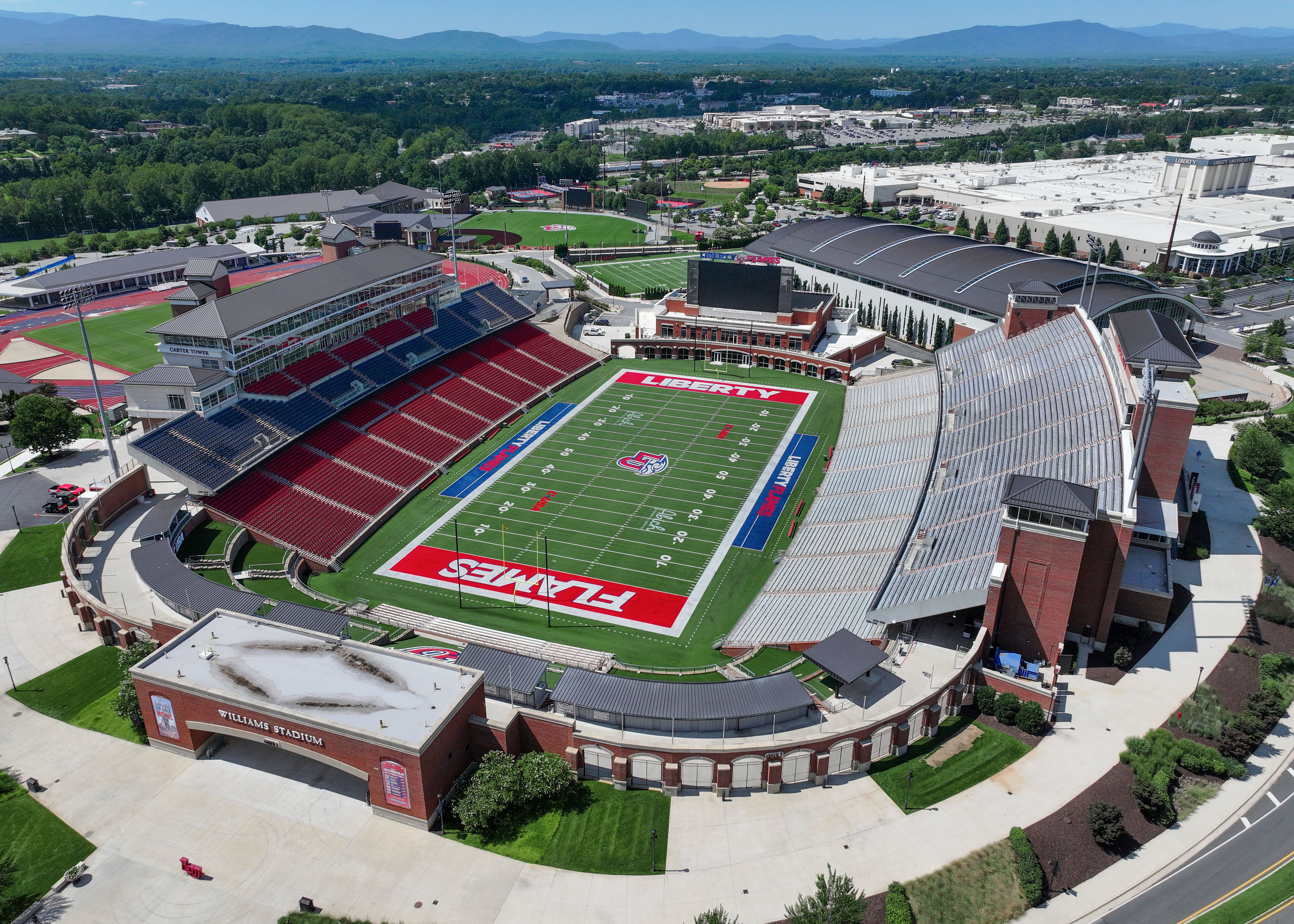
- View of the stadium in 2026

- Location in Virginia Location in the United States
- Former names: Willard May Stadium
- Location: 1972 University Boulevard, Lynchburg, Virginia 24502
- Coordinates: 37°21′14.4″N 79°10′30″W
- Owner: Liberty University
- Operator: Liberty University
- Capacity: 25,000 (2018–present) Former capacity: List: 19,200 (2010–17); 12,000 (1989–2009)
- Surface: FieldTurf
- Record attendance: 50,000+ (2017 Commencement)

Construction
- Groundbreaking: May 8, 1989
- Opened: October 21, 1989; 36 years ago
- Renovated: 2010–2011, 2017–2018
- Expanded: 2010, 2018
- Cost: $18 million ($46.8 million in 2025 dollars)
- Architects: Haken/Corley and Associates of Raleigh, N.C.
- General contractor: McDevitt & Street

Tenant
- Liberty Flames (NCAA) (1989–present)

Website
- liberty.edu/williamsstadium

Arthur L. Williams Stadium is a 25,000-seat football stadium located on the campus of Liberty University in Lynchburg, Virginia, United States. The stadium was built in 1989 and plays host to Liberty Flames football, which is a part of the NCAA Division I - Football Bowl Subdivision (FBS). A new football center at the north end of the stadium completed construction in April of 2020, this facility houses a new home locker room, coaches offices, meeting rooms and training facility as well as a 16,000-square-foot (1,500 m^{2}) weight room. In the 2009 off season, Liberty University added a video scoreboard on the north end of the field. The video scoreboard measured 20 feet (6 m) tall and 36 feet (11 m) wide. This video board was replaced by a massive new high-definition video board in time for the 2018 football season.

In September 2011, a ribbon video board was added to the facade of the upper deck. This too was replaced by a state-of-the-art ribbon video board on both the eastern and western facades of the upper deck in 2018.

The stadium was named in 1994 to honor Arthur L. Williams Jr., who is a major contributor to the university.

== Expansion ==
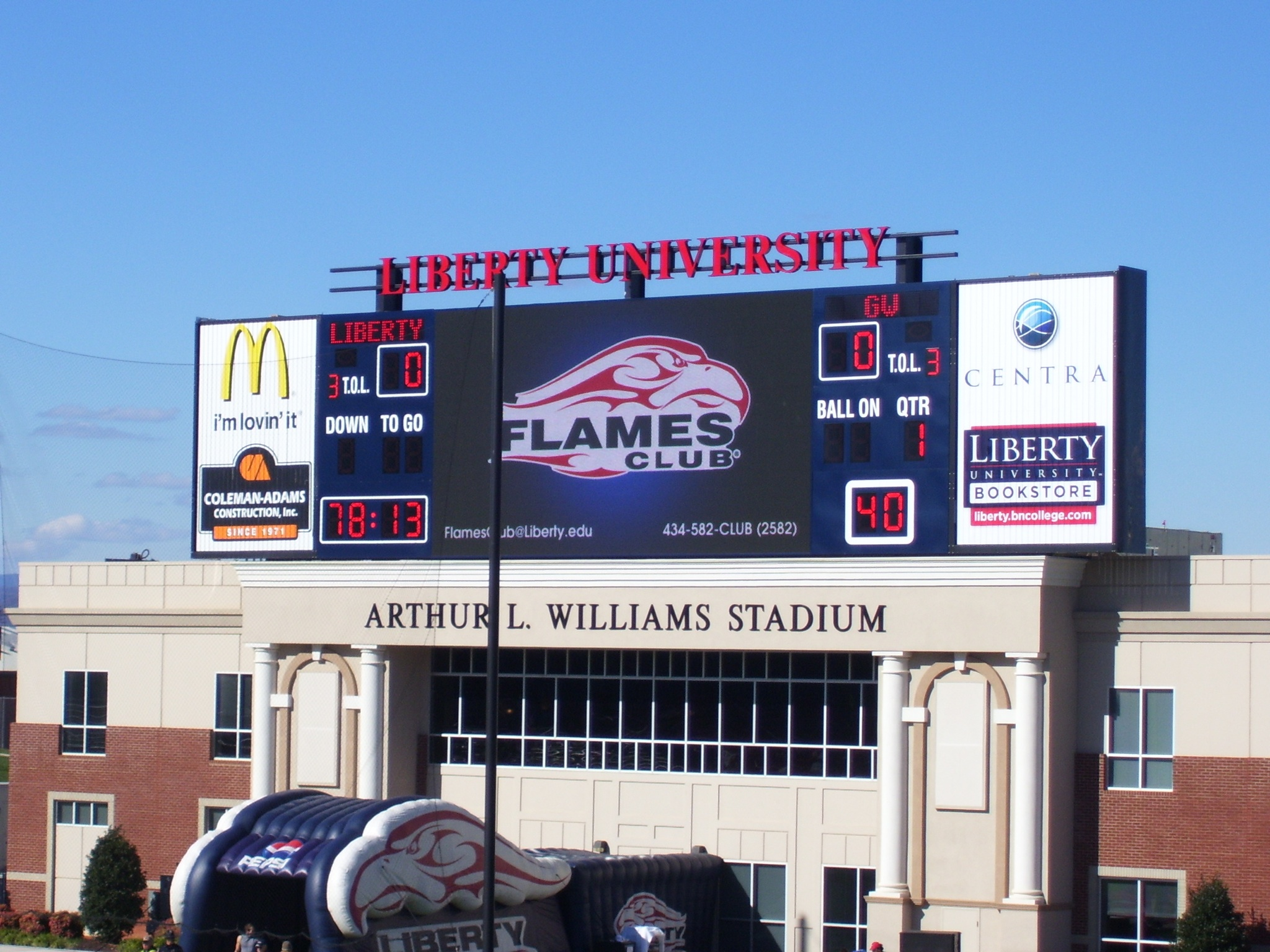
Williams Stadium after the construction of its old scoreboard, 2010

Liberty University President Jerry Falwell Jr. announced on August 28, 2009, a three-phase addition to Williams Stadium. The plan was to increase the seating capacity of the stadium from 12,000 seats to 30,000. The first phase of the construction included a five-story press box and expanded the stadium by 7,200 seats. This was done by adding a second deck to the home side of the stadium and lengthening the east and west stands of the stadium.

The seating capacity was 19,200 after phase one was completed. The estimated cost for the first phase of the project was $18 million. The new press tower was ready for Liberty's home game against Savannah State held on October 2, 2010. The tower includes 18 luxury suites, all of which were sold for the 2010 season.

Phase two has added a second deck to the student side, which has increased capacity to 25,000, beginning with the 2018 football season. The estimated cost for the second phase of the project was $40 million. Phase three will complete a "horseshoe" around the south end zone, bringing the total capacity to 30,000. Williams Stadium has the potential to be expanded past 60,000 in the future.

== Gallery ==
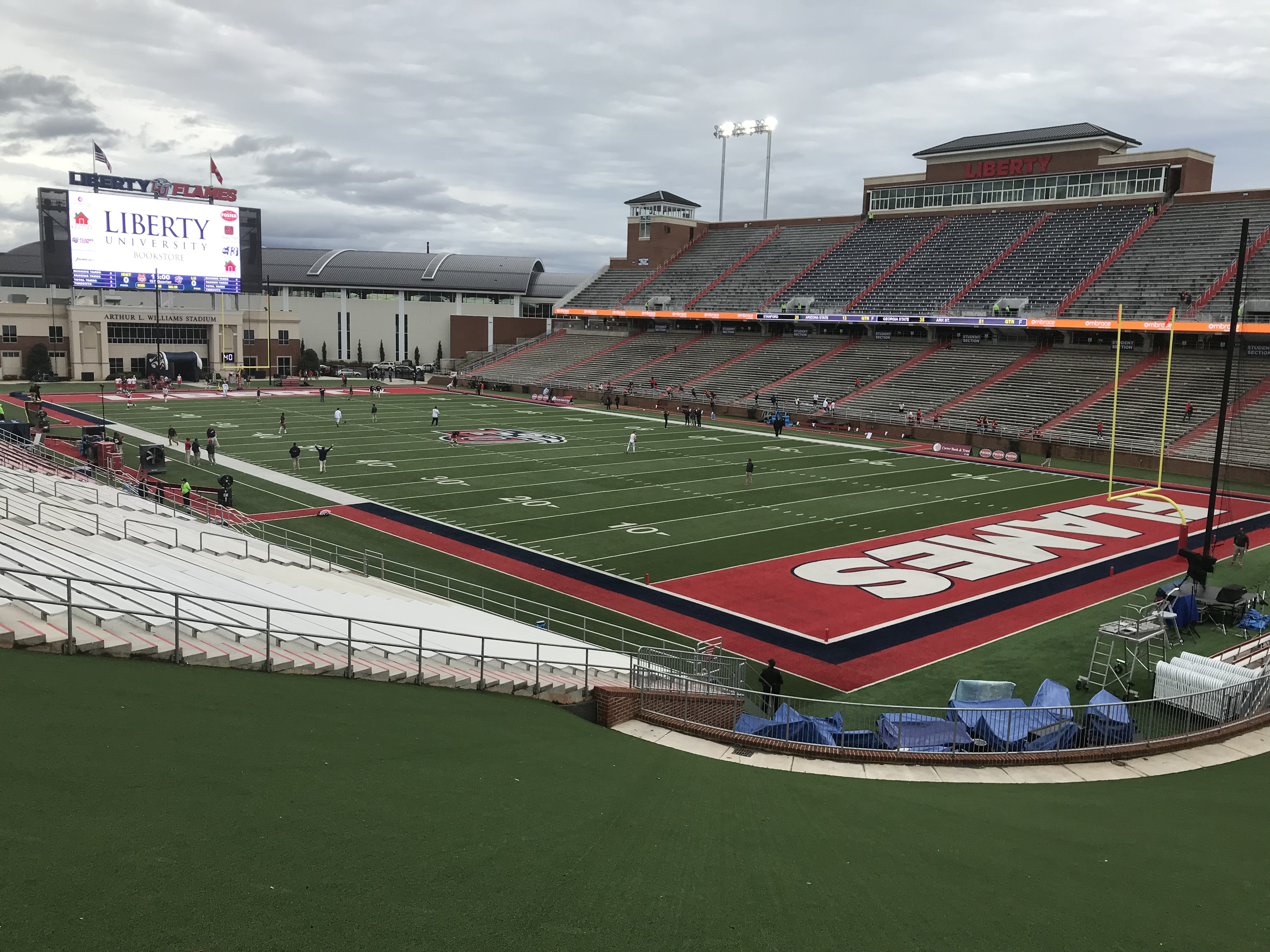
Williams Stadium Field 2018

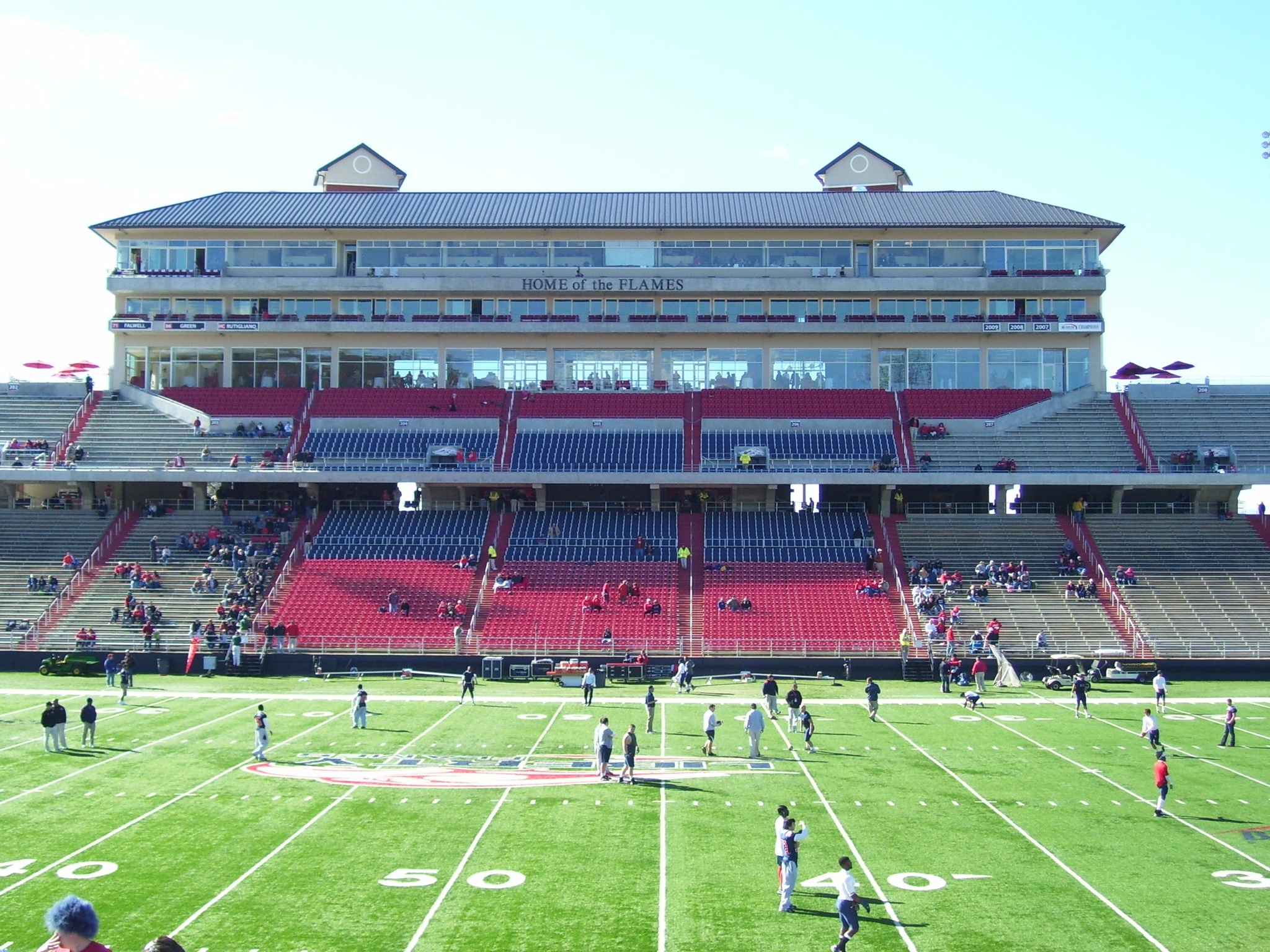
Side view in 2010

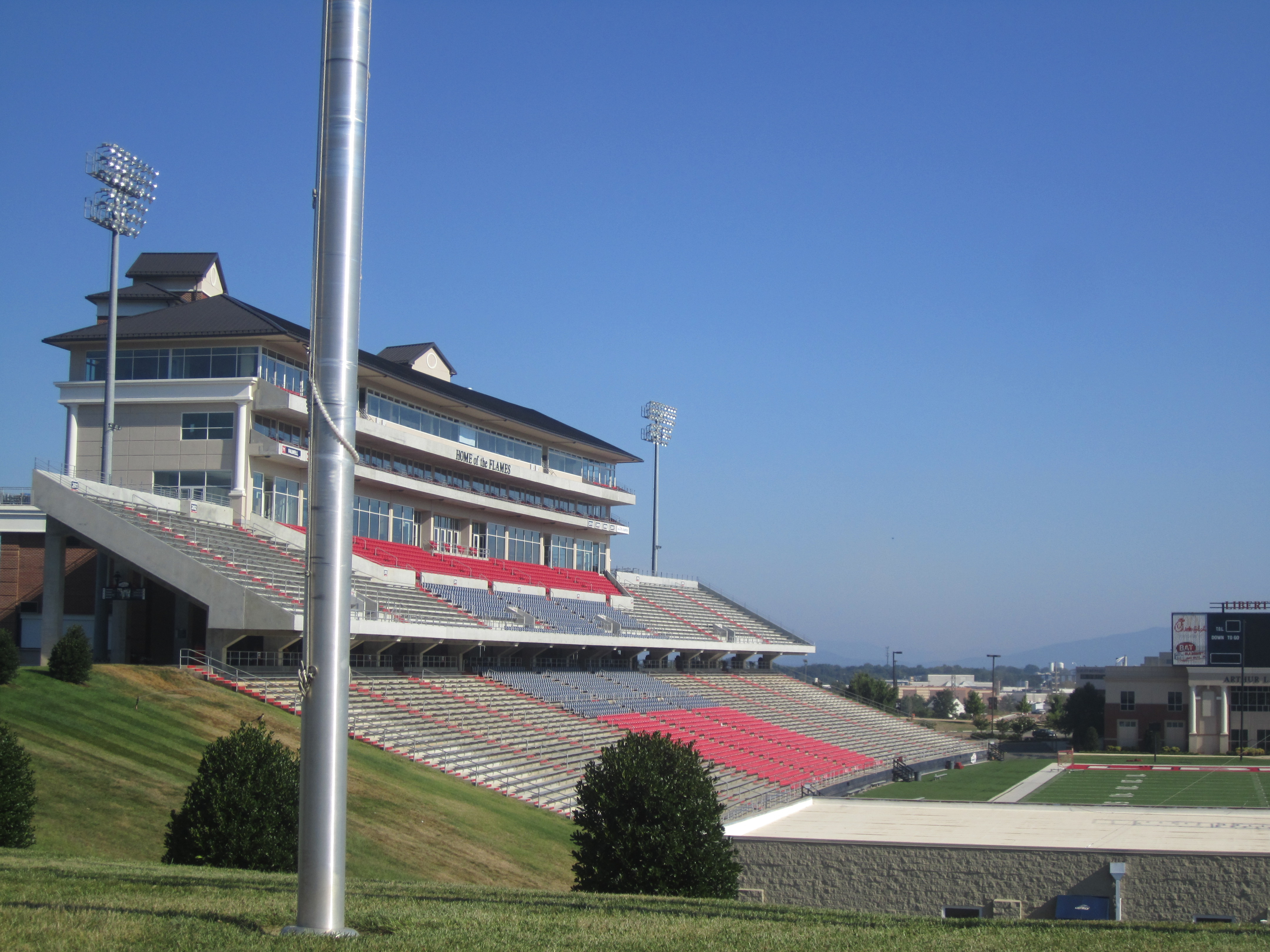
End stand, 2011

== See also ==
- List of NCAA Division I FBS football stadiums
