= Bailey Memorial Stadium =

Stadium in Clinton, South Carolina

Coordinates: 34°27′42″N 81°51′41″W

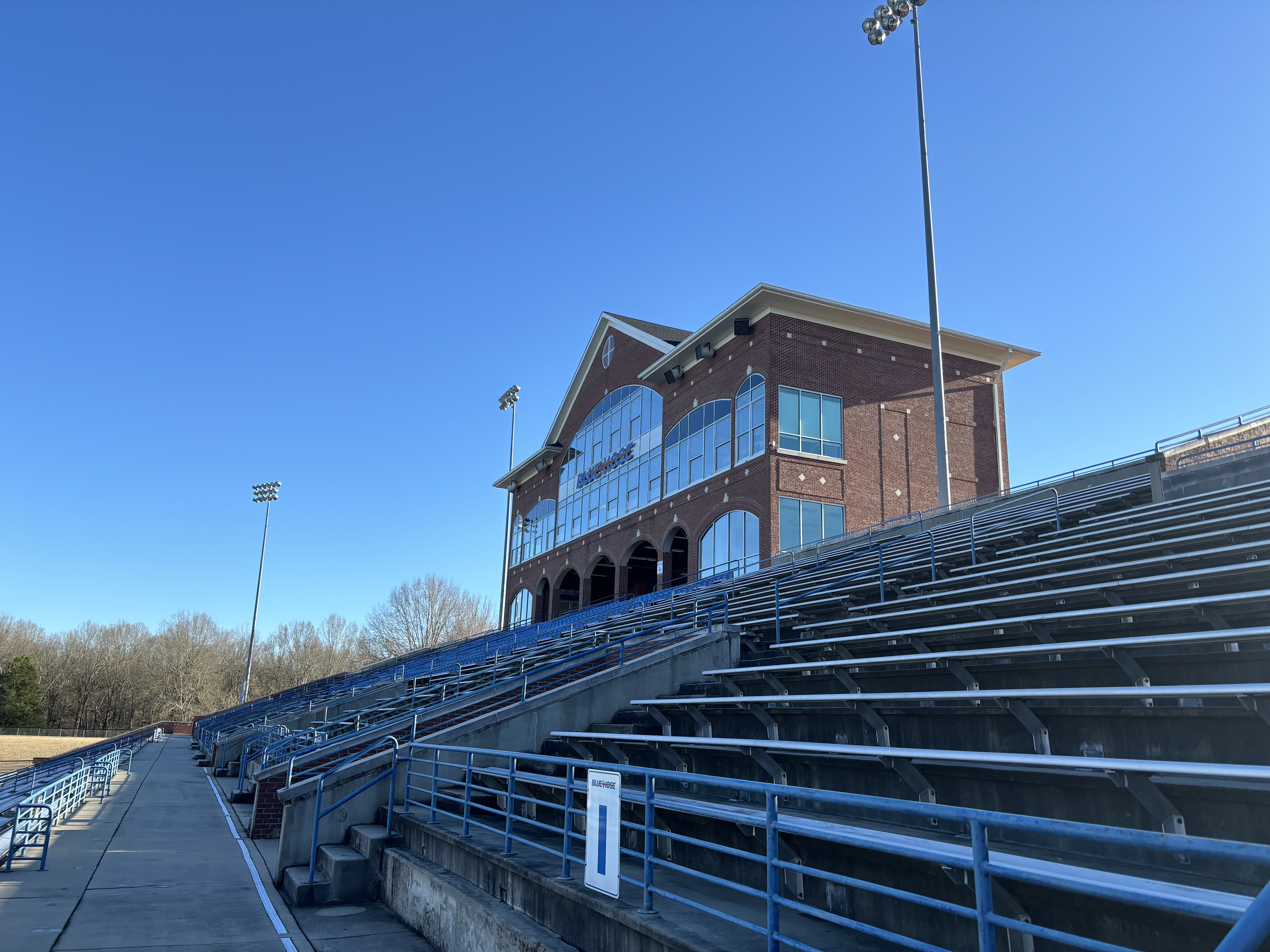
- Interactive map of Bailey Memorial Stadium
- Location: 503 South Broad Street; Clinton, SC 29325
- Owner: Presbyterian College
- Operator: Presbyterian College
- Capacity: 6,500
- Surface: Natural Grass

Construction
- Groundbreaking: 2001; 25 years ago
- Opened: October 19, 2002; 23 years ago
- Cost: $8.5 million ($15.2 million in 2025 dollars)
- Architects: Jackson & Simms Architects
- General contractors: Triangle Construction Co., Inc.

Tenant
- Presbyterian Blue Hose (NCAA) (2002–present)

Bailey Memorial Stadium is a 6,500-seat multi-purpose stadium in Clinton, South Carolina. It is home to the Presbyterian College Blue Hose football team. The facility opened in 2002, replacing Old Bailey Stadium. The playing surface is named Claude Crocker Field. The facility features a multi-level press box, a spacious field house and concession stands for home and visiting fans.

== See also ==
- List of NCAA Division I FCS football stadiums
