= 2017 North Dakota State Bison football team =

American college football season

2017 North Dakota State Bison football

NCAA Division I champion MVFC champion

NCAA Division I Championship, W 17–13 vs. James Madison
- Conference: Missouri Valley Football Conference

Ranking
- STATS: No. 1
- FCS Coaches: No. 1
- Record: 14–1 (7–1 MVFC)
- Head coach: Chris Klieman (4th season)
- Offensive coordinator: Courtney Messingham (1st season)
- Offensive scheme: Pro-style
- Defensive coordinator: Matt Entz (4th season)
- Base defense: 3–4
- Home stadium: Fargodome

2017 Missouri Valley Football Conference standings
	Conf.			Overall
Team	W		L	W		L
No. 1 North Dakota State $^	7	–	1	14	–	1
No. 3 South Dakota State ^	6	–	2	11	–	3
No. 19 Northern Iowa ^	6	–	2	8	–	5
No. 13 Western Illinois ^	5	–	3	8	–	4
No. 15 South Dakota ^	4	–	4	8	–	5
Illinois State	4	–	4	6	–	5
Youngstown State	4	–	4	6	–	5
Southern Illinois	2	–	6	4	–	7
Missouri State	2	–	6	3	–	8
Indiana State	0	–	8	0	–	11
$ – Conference champion; ^ – FCS playoff participant; Rankings from STATS Poll

The 2017 North Dakota State Bison football team represented North Dakota State University in the 2017 NCAA Division I FCS football season. They were led by fourth-year head coach Chris Klieman. The team played their 25th season in the Fargodome in Fargo, North Dakota as members of the Missouri Valley Football Conference. The Bison finished the season 14–1, 7–1 in MVFC play to win the MVFC championship for the seventh consecutive year. As a result, the Bison received the conference's automatic bid to the FCS Playoffs as the No. 2 seed. In the playoffs, they defeated San Diego, Wofford, and Sam Houston State to advance to the National Championship game. There they defeated James Madison 17–13 to win the school's sixth National Championship in seven years. The September 30 game against Missouri State was the 700th victory since the team's founding in 1894.

== Schedule ==
Date	Time	Opponent	Rank	Site	TV	Result	Attendance
September 2	2:30 p.m.	Mississippi Valley State*	No. 2	Fargodome; Fargo, ND	NBC ND; ESPN3	W 72–7	18,502
September 9	3:00 p.m.	at No. 7 Eastern Washington*	No. 2	Roos Field; Cheney, WA	NBC ND; ESPN3	W 40–13	10,231
September 23	2:30 p.m.	Robert Morris*	No. 2	Fargodome; Fargo, ND (Trees Bowl)	NBC ND; ESPN3	W 56–0	18,308
September 30	1:00 p.m.	Missouri State	No. 2	Fargodome; Fargo, ND	NBC ND; ESPN3	W 38–11	18,892
October 7	12:00 p.m.	at Indiana State	No. 2	Memorial Stadium; Terre Haute, IN	NBC ND; ESPN3	W 52–0	4,743
October 14	6:00 p.m.	at No. 8 Youngstown State	No. 2	Stambaugh Stadium; Youngstown, OH	ESPN3	W 27–24 ^{OT}	16,408
October 21	2:30 p.m.	No. 10 Western Illinois	No. 2	Fargodome; Fargo, ND	NBC ND; ESPN3	W 24–12	18,630
October 28	2:30 p.m.	Northern Iowa	No. 2	Fargodome; Fargo, ND	NBC ND; ESPN3	W 30–14	18,687
November 4	2:00 p.m.	at No. 8 South Dakota State	No. 2	Dana J. Dykhouse Stadium; Brookings, SD (Dakota Marker)	NBC ND; ESPN3	L 21–33	18,130
November 11	2:30 p.m.	No. 10 South Dakota	No. 5	Fargodome; Fargo, ND (Harvest Bowl)	NBC ND; ESPN3	W 49–14	18,623
November 18	12:00 p.m.	at No. 21 Illinois State	No. 4	Hancock Stadium; Normal, IL	NBC ND; ESPN3	W 20–7	7,664
December 2	2:30 p.m.	San Diego*	No. 4	Fargodome; Fargo, ND (FCS Playoffs Second Round)	NBC ND; ESPN3	W 38–3	18,067
December 9	11:00 a.m.	No. 8 Wofford*	No. 4	Fargodome; Fargo, ND (FCS Playoffs Quarterfinals)	ESPN2	W 42–10	17,008
December 15	7:00 p.m.	No. 5 Sam Houston State*	No. 4	Fargodome; Fargo, ND (FCS Playoffs Semifinals)	ESPN2	W 55–13	18,279
January 6	11:00 a.m.	No. 1 James Madison*	No. 4	Toyota Stadium; Frisco, TX (FCS National Championship)	ESPN2	W 17–13	19,090
*Non-conference game; Rankings from STATS Poll released prior to the game; All times are in Central time

== Roster ==
2017 North Dakota State Bison Football
Quarterback: 7 Cole Davis – Senior (6′3, 215); 12 Easton Stick – (redshirt) Junior (6′2, 221); 15 Holden Hotchkiss – Freshman (6′3, 191); 16 Noah Sanders – Freshman (6′2, 210); Tailback: 8 Bruce Anderson – Junior (5′11, 216); 10 Lance Dunn – (redshirt) Junior (5′9, 211); 18 Adam Cofield – (redshirt) Freshman (5′11, 205); 24 Demaris Purifoy – (redshirt) Sophomore (6′1, 197); 28 Ty Brooks – (redshirt) Sophomore (5′9, 180); 30 Seth Wilson – Freshman (5′10, 189); Wide receiver: 1 Christian Watson – Freshman (6′3, 186); 2 Cordell Pimienta – (redshirt) Sophomore (6′0, 177); 4 Dimitri Williams – Junior (5′11, 191); 5 Andy Voyen – Freshman (6′2, 196); 7 Peter Isais – Freshman (5′11, 170); 13 Desmond Cain – Junior (5′10, 185); 15 Daniel Polansky – Senior (6′0, 190); 16 RJ Urzendowski – Senior (6′0, 200); 17 Carson Yaggie – Freshman (6′2, 196); 19 Brant Bohmert – Freshman (5′11, 179); 20 Darrius Shepherd – (redshirt) Junior (5′11, 186); 31 Victor Kizewski – (redshirt) Freshman (6′0, 192); 83 Dallas Freeman – (redshirt) Junior (6′1, 197); 84 Trevor Heit – (redshirt) Freshman (5′9, 177); 89 Cole Jacob – (redshirt) Freshman (6′1, 193); Tight end: 33 Austin Avery – Freshman (6′3, 241) (+FB); 40 Costner Ching – Freshman (6′3, 249) (+FB); 44 Cody Mauch – Freshman (6′4, 234); 46 Noah Gindorff – Freshman (6′6, 249); 81 Josh Babicz – Freshman (6′6, 225); 82 Ben Ellefson – (redshirt) Sophomore (6′3, 250); 85 Nate Jenson – (redshirt) Junior (6′6, 246); 86 Jeff Illies – Senior (6′3, 235); 87 Connor Wentz – Senior (6′3, 250); 88 Matt Anderson – (redshirt) Sophomore (6′4, 247)	Fullback: 32 Zak Kuntz – (redshirt) Freshman (6′2, 249); 34 Brock Robbins – (redshirt) Sophomore (6′1, 246); 39 Garrett Malstrom – (redshirt) Sophomore (6′0, 250); Offensive lineman: 54 Dillon Radunz - OT – (redshirt) Freshman (6′6, 287); 57 Zach Willis - C – Freshman (6′4, 305); 58 Josh Howieson - OT – (redshirt) Freshman (6′5, 293); 59 Karson Schoening - C – (redshirt) Freshman (6′5, 297); 61 Zach Kubas - OG – (redshirt) Freshman (6′4, 283); 62 Bryce Messner - OG – Senior (6′3, 291); 64 Colin Conner - OT – (redshirt) Junior (6′5, 309); 65 Jack Albrecht - OG – (redshirt) Sophomore (6′5, 278); 66 Nash Jensen - OG – Freshman (6′4, 349); 67 Cordell Volson - OT – (redshirt) Freshman (6′6, 299); 68 Zack Johnson - OT – (redshirt) Sophomore (6′6, 312); 71 Luke Bacon - OT – (redshirt) Junior (6′5, 299); 72 Erik Olson - OT – Senior (6′5, 277); 73 Zack Ziemer - OG – Senior (6′4, 299); 74 Tanner Volson - C – (redshirt) Junior (6′4, 301); 75 Austin Kuhnert - OG – Senior (6′4, 304); 76 Ben Hecht - OG – (redshirt) Freshman (6′5, 277); Defensive tackle: 53 Cole Karcz – (redshirt) Sophomore (6′4, 262); 60 Lane Tucker – Freshman (6′4, 261); 63 Aaron Steidl – (redshirt) Junior (6′2, 288); 69 Blake Williams – (redshirt) Junior (6′3, 290); 78 Michael Kelly – (redshirt) Freshman (6′1, 302); 90 Grant Morgan – Senior (6′4, 283); 92 Jack Darnell – (redshirt) Sophomore (6′2, 292); 97 Quinn Alo – (redshirt) Freshman (6′2, 296); 98 Matt Biegler – (redshirt) Freshman (6′3, 272); 99 Nate Tanguay – Senior (6′4, 291); Defensive end: 56 Justice Kelly – (redshirt) Freshman (6′3, 193); 56 Tanner Sundt – Freshman (6′4, 232); 70 Spencer Waege – Freshman (6′4, 245); 77 Logan McCormick – Freshman (6′2, 232); 91 Derrek Tuszka – (redshirt) Sophomore (6′5, 245); 93 Jarrod Tuszka – Senior (6′3, 255); 94 Stanley Jones – (redshirt) Junior (6′3, 245); 95 Caleb Butler – (redshirt) Junior (6′3, 244); 96 Greg Menard – Senior (6′2, 241)	Linebacker: 1 Chris Board – Senior (6′1, 230); 3 Mason Hofstedt – Freshman (6′0, 193) (+TB); 41 Jack Begley – Freshman (6′3, 218); 42 Jabril Cox – (redshirt) Freshman (6′3, 227); 43 Beau Pauly – (redshirt) Freshman (6′2, 216); 44 Matt Plank – Senior (6′0, 219); 45 Levi Jordheim – (redshirt) Junior (6′2, 220); 47 Max Bautch – Freshman (6′0, 219); 48 Dan Marlette – (redshirt) Junior (6′1, 225); 49 Nick DeLuca – Senior (6′3, 245); 50 Ross Kennelly – (redshirt) Freshman (5′11, 212); 52 Jackson Hankey – Freshman (6′1, 217); 55 Aaron Mercadel – (redshirt) Sophomore (5′11, 206); Cornerbacks: 2 Dom Davis – (redshirt) Sophomore (5′11, 182); 9 Marquise Bridges – (redshirt) Sophomore (5′11, 182); 17 Felix Dixon – (redshirt) Freshman (5′11, 166); 21 Jalen Allison – (redshirt) Junior (6′0, 184); 23 Jaylaan Wimbush – (redshirt) Junior (6′0, 192); 27 Ross Godfrey – (redshirt) Freshman (5′9, 166); 33 Bryce Bennot – (redshirt) Junior (5′8, 174); 35 Josh Hayes – Freshman (5′11, 178); 37 Tre Fort – (redshirt) Sophomore (5′8, 185); 46 Ross Effertz – (redshirt) Sophomore (5′11, 200); Safeties: 3 Tre Dempsey - FS – Senior (5′10, 184); 5 Robbie Grimsley - SS – Junior (6′0, 191); 6 James Hendricks - SS – (redshirt) Sophomore (6′1, 205); 25 Michael Tutsie - SS – Freshman (5′10, 188); 26 Keenan Hodenfield - FS – Senior (5′11, 182); 29 Eric Bachmeier - SS – (redshirt) Junior (6′2, 202); 35 Dawson Weber - FS – Freshman (6′2, 193); 38 Jaxon Brown - FS – (redshirt) Sophomore (6′2, 203); Placekicker: 25 Jake Reinholz – Freshman (6′3, 198); 36 Cam Pedersen – Junior (6′2, 199); Punter: 19 Jackson Koonce – Senior (6′1, 197); 22 Garret Wegner – (redshirt) Freshman (6′0, 184) (+K); Long Snappers: 51 James Fisher – Senior (6′2, 225)

=== Recruiting class ===
College recruiting (2017)
Name	Hometown	School	Height	Weight	Commit date
Holden Hotchkiss; QB-Pro	Lakeland, Florida	Lakeland High School	6 ft 4 in (1.93 m)	205 lb (93 kg)	February 1, 2017 (Signed) / July 6, 2016 (Committed)
Holden Hotchkiss; QB-Pro	Recruit ratings: Scout: 247Sports: ESPN:				
Noah Sanders; QB-Pro	Lakeville, Minnesota	Apple Valley High School	6 ft 3 in (1.91 m)	200 lb (91 kg)	Walk-On / January 4, 2017 (Committed)
Noah Sanders; QB-Pro	Recruit ratings: Scout: 247Sports: ESPN:				
Seth Wilson; TB	Holmen, Wisconsin	Holmen High School	5 ft 10 in (1.78 m)	195 lb (88 kg)	February 1, 2017 (Signed) / November 14, 2016 (Committed)
Seth Wilson; TB	Recruit ratings: Scout: 247Sports: ESPN:				
Christian Watson; WR	Tampa, Florida	Plant High School	6 ft 3 in (1.91 m)	190 lb (86 kg)	February 1, 2017 (Signed) / July 27, 2016 (Committed)
Christian Watson; WR	Recruit ratings: Scout: 247Sports: ESPN:				
Brant Bohmert; WR	Fargo, North Dakota	Northern Cass High School	5 ft 11 in (1.80 m)	175 lb (79 kg)	Walk-On / December 26, 2016 (Committed)
Brant Bohmert; WR	Recruit ratings: Scout: 247Sports: ESPN:				
Andy Voyen; WR	Stillwater, Minnesota	Mahtomedi Senior High School	6 ft 3 in (1.91 m)	205 lb (93 kg)	Walk-On / January 26, 2017 (Committed)
Andy Voyen; WR	Recruit ratings: Scout: 247Sports: ESPN:				
Costner Ching; FB / TE	Castlewood, South Dakota	Castlewood High School	6 ft 3 in (1.91 m)	250 lb (110 kg)	Walk-On / January 11, 2017 (Committed)
Costner Ching; FB / TE	Recruit ratings: Scout: 247Sports: ESPN:				
Austin Avery; TE / FB	Yorkville, Illinois	Yorkville High School	6 ft 3 in (1.91 m)	225 lb (102 kg)	February 1, 2017 (Signed) / January 29, 2017 (Committed)
Austin Avery; TE / FB	Recruit ratings: Scout: 247Sports: ESPN:				
Josh Babicz; TE	Barrington, Illinois	Barrington High School	6 ft 6 in (1.98 m)	228 lb (103 kg)	February 1, 2017 (Signed) / August 8, 2016 (Committed)
Josh Babicz; TE	Recruit ratings: Scout: 247Sports: ESPN:				
Noah Gindorff; TE	Crosby, Minnesota	Crosby-ironton Secondary High School	6 ft 6 in (1.98 m)	235 lb (107 kg)	February 1, 2017 (Signed) / July 26, 2016 (Committed)
Noah Gindorff; TE	Recruit ratings: Scout: 247Sports: ESPN:				
Cody Mauch; TE	Hankinson, North Dakota	Hankinson High School	6 ft 5 in (1.96 m)	221 lb (100 kg)	Walk-On / January 13, 2017 (Committed)
Cody Mauch; TE	Recruit ratings: Scout: 247Sports: ESPN:				
Nash Jensen; OT	Maple Grove, Minnesota	Osseo Senior High School	6 ft 4 in (1.93 m)	350 lb (160 kg)	February 1, 2017 (Signed) / June 25, 2016 (Committed)
Nash Jensen; OT	Recruit ratings: Scout: 247Sports: ESPN:				
Zach Willis; OG	West Fargo, North Dakota	West Fargo High School	6 ft 3 in (1.91 m)	315 lb (143 kg)	February 1, 2017 (Signed) / July 4, 2016 (Committed)
Zach Willis; OG	Recruit ratings: Scout: 247Sports: ESPN:				
Logan McCormick; DE	Appleton, Wisconsin	Kimberly High School	6 ft 2 in (1.88 m)	235 lb (107 kg)	February 1, 2017 (Signed) / June 27, 2016 (Committed)
Logan McCormick; DE	Recruit ratings: Scout: 247Sports: ESPN:				
Tanner Sundt; DE	Farmington, Minnesota	Farmington Senior High School	6 ft 4 in (1.93 m)	237 lb (108 kg)	February 1, 2017 (Signed) / June 22, 2016 (Committed)
Tanner Sundt; DE	Recruit ratings: Scout: 247Sports: ESPN:				
Spencer Waege; DE	South Shore, South Dakota	Watertown High School	6 ft 4 in (1.93 m)	232 lb (105 kg)	February 1, 2017 (Signed) / June 6, 2016 (Committed)
Spencer Waege; DE	Recruit ratings: Scout: 247Sports: ESPN:				
Lane Tucker; DT	Gillette, Wyoming	Campbell County High School	6 ft 3 in (1.91 m)	255 lb (116 kg)	February 1, 2017 (Signed) / July 14, 2016 (Committed)
Lane Tucker; DT	Recruit ratings: Scout: 247Sports: ESPN:				
Max Bautch; OLB	Ham Lake, Minnesota	Blaine Senior High School	6 ft 1 in (1.85 m)	205 lb (93 kg)	Walk-On / December 21, 2016 (Committed)
Max Bautch; OLB	Recruit ratings: Scout: 247Sports: ESPN:				
Jack Begley; OLB	Omaha, Nebraska	Millard North High School	6 ft 3 in (1.91 m)	205 lb (93 kg)	February 1, 2017 (Signed) / July 29, 2016 (Committed)
Jack Begley; OLB	Recruit ratings: Scout: 247Sports: ESPN:				
Dawson Weber; CB	Elk Grove, California	Pleasant Grove High School	6 ft 1 in (1.85 m)	189 lb (86 kg)	February 1, 2017 (Signed) / January 15, 2017 (Committed)
Dawson Weber; CB	Recruit ratings: Scout: 247Sports: ESPN:				
Josh Hayes; S	Lakeland, Florida	Lake Gibson High School	6 ft 0 in (1.83 m)	175 lb (79 kg)	February 1, 2017 (Signed) / January 15, 2017 (Committed)
Josh Hayes; S	Recruit ratings: Scout: 247Sports: ESPN:				
Michael Tutsie; S	Indianapolis, Indiana	Warren Central High School	5 ft 11 in (1.80 m)	185 lb (84 kg)	February 1, 2017 (Signed) / January 30, 2017 (Committed)
Michael Tutsie; S	Recruit ratings: Scout: 247Sports: ESPN:				
Mason Hofstedt; ATH OLB / TB	Cannon Falls, Minnesota	Cannon Falls High School	6 ft 0 in (1.83 m)	185 lb (84 kg)	Walk-On / January 5, 2017 (Committed)
Mason Hofstedt; ATH OLB / TB	Recruit ratings: Scout: 247Sports: ESPN:				
Carson Yaggie; ATH CB / QB	Breckenridge, Minnesota	Breckenridge High School	6 ft 2 in (1.88 m)	181 lb (82 kg)	Walk-On / January 12, 2017 (Committed)
Carson Yaggie; ATH CB / QB	Recruit ratings: Scout: 247Sports: ESPN:				
Jake Reinholz; K	Fargo, North Dakota	Shanley High School	6 ft 2 in (1.88 m)	175 lb (79 kg)	Walk-On / December 2, 2016 (Committed)
Jake Reinholz; K	Recruit ratings: Scout: 247Sports: ESPN:				
Desmond Cain; WR	Delray Beach, Florida	University of Illinois	5 ft 11 in (1.80 m)	185 lb (84 kg)	2017 (Transfer)
Desmond Cain; WR	Recruit ratings: Scout: 247Sports: ESPN:				
Overall recruit ranking: Scout: #- 247Sports: #138 ESPN: #-
Note: In many cases, Scout, Rivals, 247Sports, On3, and ESPN may conflict in their listings of height and weight.; In these cases, the average was taken. ESPN grades are on a 100-point scale.; Sources: "2017 Team Ranking". Rivals.com.

== Coaching staff ==
Name	Position	Year at North Dakota State	Alma mater (Year)
Chris Klieman	Head coach	7th	Northern Iowa (1990)
Matt Entz	Defensive coordinator Linebackers	4th	Wayne State (NE) (1995)
Courtney Messingham	Offensive coordinator Running backs	1st	Northern Iowa (1990)
Atif Austin	Special teams coordinator Wide receiver coach	4th	Iowa State (2003)
Conor Riley	Running game coordinator Offensive line coach	5th	Nebraska–Omaha (2002)
Nick Goeser	Defensive tackles coach	8th	Wisconsin–Eau Claire (2003)
Randy Hedberg	Quarterbacks coach	4th	Minot State (1977)
Joe Klanderman	Defensive backs coach	4th	Minnesota State Mankato (2001)
Tyler Roehl	Tight ends Fullbacks	4th	North Dakota State (2009)
Bryan Shepherd	Cornerbacks coach	2nd	North Dakota State (2013)
LeDominique Williams	Defensive ends coach	1st	University of Charleston (2009)
Jake Otten	Video coordinator	4th	Cal Poly (2013)

== Game summaries ==
Polls are based on the FCS STATS Poll

=== Mississippi Valley State ===
	1	2	3	4	Total
Delta Devils	0	7	0	0	7
No. 2 Bison	30	14	21	7	72

Box Score.

=== At Eastern Washington ===
	1	2	3	4	Total
No. 2 Bison	9	10	7	14	40
No. 7 Eagles	7	3	3	0	13

Box Score.

=== Robert Morris ===
	1	2	3	4	Total
Colonials	0	0	0	0	0
No. 2 Bison	35	14	7	0	56

Box Score.

=== Missouri State ===
	1	2	3	4	Total
Bears	0	5	0	6	11
No. 2 Bison	14	3	7	14	38

Box Score.

=== At Indiana State ===
	1	2	3	4	Total
No. 2 Bison	7	17	21	7	52
Sycamores	0	0	0	0	0

Box Score.

=== At Youngstown State ===
	1	2	3	4	OT	Total
No. 2 Bison	0	10	7	7	3	27
No. 8 Penguins	10	0	7	7	0	24

Box Score.

=== Western Illinois ===
	1	2	3	4	Total
No. 10 Leathernecks	9	3	0	0	12
No. 2 Bison	3	7	14	0	24

Box Score.

=== Northern Iowa ===
	1	2	3	4	Total
Panthers	0	7	0	7	14
No. 2 Bison	0	7	10	13	30

Box Score.

=== At South Dakota State ===
	1	2	3	4	Total
No. 2 Bison	7	0	14	0	21
No. 10 Jackrabbits	3	14	9	7	33

Box Score.

=== South Dakota ===
	1	2	3	4	Total
No. 10 Coyotes	7	7	0	0	14
No. 5 Bison	14	14	14	7	49

Box Score.

=== At Illinois State ===
	1	2	3	4	Total
No. 4 Bison	0	0	13	7	20
No. 21 Redbirds	0	0	0	7	7

Box Score.

== FCS Playoffs ==
=== San Diego–Second Round ===
	1	2	3	4	Total
Toreros	0	0	0	3	3
No. 4 Bison	14	3	21	0	38

Box Score.

=== Wofford–Quarterfinals ===
	1	2	3	4	Total
No. 8 Terriers	3	7	0	0	10
No. 4 Bison	14	21	7	0	42

Box Score.

=== Sam Houston State–Semifinals ===
	1	2	3	4	Total
No. 5 Bearkats	3	0	10	0	13
No. 4 Bison	21	20	14	0	55

Box Score.

=== James Madison–Championship ===
	1	2	3	4	Total
No. 4 Bison	7	10	0	0	17
No. 1 Dukes	3	3	7	0	13

Box Score.

== Ranking movements ==
Ranking movements Legend: ██ Increase in ranking ██ Decrease in ranking ( ) = First-place votes
	Week													
Poll	Pre	1	2	3	4	5	6	7	8	9	10	11	12	Final
STATS FCS	2 (19)	2 (8)	2 (10)	2 (5)	2 (5)	2 (8)	2 (8)	2 (7)	2 (9)	2 (6)	5	4	4	1
Coaches	2	2	2	2 (1)	2 (1)	2 (1)	2 (1)	2	2	2	6	6	4	1
