= 2018 NCAA Division I Football Championship Game =

Postseason college football game

2018 NCAA Division I Football Championship
- FCS National Championship Game
| North Dakota State Bison | James Madison Dukes |
| (13–1) | (14–0) |
| MVFC | CAA |
| 17 | 13 |
| Head coach: Chris Klieman | Head coach: Mike Houston |
| STATS / Seed; 4 / 2 | STATS / Seed; 1 / 1 |
| | 1 | 2 | 3 | 4 | Total |
|---|---|---|---|---|---|
| North Dakota State | 7 | 10 | 0 | 0 | 17 |
| James Madison | 3 | 3 | 7 | 0 | 13 |
- Date: January 6, 2018
- Season: 2017
- Stadium: Toyota Stadium
- Location: Frisco, Texas
- MVP: Easton Stick (QB, North Dakota State)
- Favorite: North Dakota State by 3
- Referee: Michael VanderVelde (Southland)
- Attendance: 19,090

United States TV coverage
- Network: ESPN2
- Announcers: Dave Neal (play-by-play), Matt Stinchcomb (color), Quint Kessenich (sideline)

The 2018 NCAA Division I Football Championship Game was a postseason college football game that determined a national champion in the NCAA Division I Football Championship Subdivision for the 2017 season. It was played at Toyota Stadium in Frisco, Texas, on January 6, 2018, with kickoff at 12:00 noon EST, and was the culminating game of the 2017 FCS Playoffs. With sponsorship from Northwestern Mutual, the game was officially known as the NCAA FCS Football Championship Presented by Northwestern Mutual.

== Teams ==
The participants of the 2018 NCAA Division I Football Championship Game were the finalists of the 2017 FCS Playoffs, which began with a 24-team bracket. No. 1 seed James Madison and No. 2 seed North Dakota State qualified for the final by winning their semifinal games. James Madison was the designated home team for the final game.

=== North Dakota State Bison ===
North Dakota State finished their regular season with a 10–1 record (7–1 in conference). Their one loss was to South Dakota State, 33–21. In the FCS playoffs, they defeated San Diego, Wofford, and Sam Houston State to reach the finals. The Bison entered the championship game with a 5–0 record in prior FCS finals, occurring consecutively in the 2011 through 2015 seasons.

=== James Madison Dukes ===
James Madison finished their regular season with an 11–0 record (8–0 in conference). In the FCS playoffs, they defeated Stony Brook, Weber State, and South Dakota State to reach the finals. The Dukes entered the championship game with a 2–0 record in prior FCS/Division I-AA finals, having defeated Montana for the 2004 season title, and Youngstown State for the 2016 season title.

== Game summary ==
=== Scoring summary ===
Scoring summary

| Quarter | Time | Drive | | | Team | Scoring information | Score | |
| Quarter | Time | Plays | Yards | TOP | Team | Scoring information | NDSU | JMU |
|---|---|---|---|---|---|---|---|---|
| 1 | 6:40 | 11 | 66 | 6:30 | NDSU | Bruce Anderson 3-yard touchdown run, Cam Pedersen kick good | 7 | 0 |
| 1 | 3:48 | 4 | 0 | 0:15 | JMU | 31-yard field goal by Ethan Ratke | 7 | 3 |
| 2 | 4:14 | 5 | 56 | 3:16 | NDSU | Darrius Shepherd 50-yard touchdown reception from Easton Stick, Pedersen kick good | 14 | 3 |
| 2 | 0:39 | 7 | 26 | 1:32 | NDSU | 32-yard field goal by Pedersen | 17 | 3 |
| 2 | 0:03 | 4 | 69 | 0:39 | JMU | 21-yard field goal by Ratke | 17 | 6 |
| 3 | 9:26 | 8 | 33 | 2:41 | JMU | Marcus Marshall 1-yard touchdown run, Ratke kick good | 17 | 13 |
| "TOP" = time of possession. For other American football terms, see Glossary of American football. | | | | | | | 17 | 13 |

=== Game statistics ===
| | 1 | 2 | 3 | 4 | Total |
|---|---|---|---|---|---|
| No. 2 Bison | 7 | 10 | 0 | 0 | 17 |
| No. 1 Dukes | 3 | 3 | 7 | 0 | 13 |

| Statistics | NDSU | JMU |
|---|---|---|
| First downs | 16 | 15 |
| Plays–yards | 70–264 | 62–241 |
| Rushes–yards | 48–134 | 30–93 |
| Passing yards | 130 | 148 |
| Passing: comp–att–int | 13–22–0 | 14–32–2 |
| Time of possession | 37:41 | 22:19 |

| Team | Category | Player | Statistics |
|---|---|---|---|
| North Dakota State | Passing | Easton Stick | 13–22, 130 yds, 1 TD |
| North Dakota State | Rushing | Bruce Anderson | 18 car, 63 yds, 1 TD |
| North Dakota State | Receiving | Darrius Shepherd | 6 rec, 74 yds, 1 TD |
| James Madison | Passing | Bryan Schor | 14–32, 148 yds, 2 INT |
| James Madison | Rushing | Marcus Marshall | 11 car, 30 yds, 1 TD |
| James Madison | Receiving | Riley Stapleton | 7 rec, 107 yds |
