= 2017 Davidson Wildcats football team =

American college football season

2017 Davidson Wildcats football
- Conference: Pioneer Football League
- Record: 2–9 (0–8 PFL)
- Head coach: Paul Nichols (5th season)
- Co-offensive coordinators: Matt Applebaum (1st season); Tim Zetts (1st season)
- Home stadium: Richardson Stadium

2017 Pioneer Football League standings
	Conf.			Overall
Team	W		L	W		L
No. 23 San Diego $^	8	–	0	10	–	3
Drake	6	–	2	7	–	4
Jacksonville	5	–	3	7	–	4
Campbell	5	–	3	6	–	5
Valparaiso	5	–	3	6	–	5
Butler	4	–	4	6	–	5
Dayton	4	–	4	5	–	6
Marist	3	–	5	4	–	7
Morehead State	3	–	5	4	–	7
Stetson	1	–	7	2	–	9
Davidson	0	–	8	2	–	9
$ – Conference champion; ^ – FCS playoff participant; Rankings from STATS Poll

The 2017 Davidson Wildcats football team represented Davidson College in the 2017 NCAA Division I FCS football season. They were led by fifth-year head coach Paul Nichols and played their home games at Richardson Stadium. They were members of the Pioneer Football League. They finished the season 2–9, 0–8 in PFL play to finish in last place.

On November 27, head coach Paul Nichols was fired. He finished at Davidson with a five-year record of 7–43.

== Schedule ==
Date	Time	Opponent	Site	TV	Result	Attendance
September 2	7:00 p.m.	Brevard*	Richardson Stadium; Davidson, NC	MI-CONN	W 30–7	4,017
September 9	6:00 p.m.	at Western Carolina*	E. J. Whitmire Stadium; Cullowhee, NC	ESPN3	L 17–63	11,763
September 16	7:00 p.m.	Guilford*^{†}	Richardson Stadium; Davidson, NC	MI-CONN	W 42–21	4,614
September 30	1:00 p.m.	Marist	Richardson Stadium; Davidson, NC	MI-CONN	L 9–31	2,814
October 7	1:00 p.m.	at Jacksonville	D. B. Milne Field; Jacksonville, FL	ESPN3	L 21–35	3,673
October 14	1:00 p.m.	at Stetson	Spec Martin Stadium; DeLand, FL	ESPN3	L 17–28	1,836
October 21	1:00 p.m.	Dayton	Richardson Stadium; Davidson, NC	MI-CONN	L 22–48	2,712
October 28	2:00 p.m.	at Drake	Drake Stadium; Des Moines, IA	BV	L 12–17	1,406
November 4	1:00 p.m.	Campbell	Richardson Stadium; Davidson, NC	MI-CONN	L 29–42	3,257
November 11	12:30 p.m.	San Diego	Richardson Stadium; Davidson, NC	MI-CONN	L 7–63	2,705
November 18	1:00 p.m.	at Morehead State	Jayne Stadium; Morehead, KY	OVCDN	L 14–21	3,831
*Non-conference game; ^{†}Homecoming; All times are in Eastern time

- Source: Schedule

== Game summaries ==
=== Brevard ===
	1	2	3	4	Total
Tornados	0	0	0	7	7
Wildcats	0	9	14	7	30

=== At Western Carolina ===
	1	2	3	4	Total
Wildcats	0	14	0	3	17
Catamounts	28	21	7	7	63

=== Guilford ===
	1	2	3	4	Total
Quakers	0	7	0	14	21
Wildcats	7	35	0	0	42

=== Marist ===
	1	2	3	4	Total
Red Foxes	0	14	7	10	31
Wildcats	0	6	3	0	9

=== At Jacksonville ===
	1	2	3	4	Total
Wildcats	0	0	14	7	21
Dolphins	14	14	7	0	35

=== At Stetson ===
	1	2	3	4	Total
Wildcats	7	3	7	0	17
Hatters	7	0	7	14	28

=== Dayton ===
	1	2	3	4	Total
Flyers	7	14	27	0	48
Wildcats	3	9	3	7	22

=== At Drake ===
	1	2	3	4	Total
Wildcats	0	3	3	6	12
Bulldogs	7	7	0	3	17

=== Campbell ===
	1	2	3	4	Total
Fighting Camels	7	14	14	7	42
Wildcats	12	3	14	0	29

=== San Diego ===
	1	2	3	4	Total
Toreros	14	21	14	14	63
Wildcats	0	0	7	0	7

=== At Morehead State ===
	1	2	3	4	Total
Wildcats	0	0	14	0	14
Eagles	7	0	14	0	21
