= 2017 Butler Bulldogs football team =

American college football season

2017 Butler Bulldogs football
- Conference: Pioneer Football League
- Record: 6–5 (4–4 PFL)
- Head coach: Jeff Voris (12th season)
- Offensive coordinator: Kyle Conner (2nd season)
- Defensive coordinator: Joe Cheshire (8th season)
- Home stadium: Bud and Jackie Sellick Bowl

2017 Pioneer Football League standings
	Conf.			Overall
Team	W		L	W		L
No. 23 San Diego $^	8	–	0	10	–	3
Drake	6	–	2	7	–	4
Jacksonville	5	–	3	7	–	4
Campbell	5	–	3	6	–	5
Valparaiso	5	–	3	6	–	5
Butler	4	–	4	6	–	5
Dayton	4	–	4	5	–	6
Marist	3	–	5	4	–	7
Morehead State	3	–	5	4	–	7
Stetson	1	–	7	2	–	9
Davidson	0	–	8	2	–	9
$ – Conference champion; ^ – FCS playoff participant; Rankings from STATS Poll

The 2017 Butler Bulldogs football team represented Butler University as a member of the Pioneer Football League (PFL) during the 2017 NCAA Division I FCS football season. Led by 12th-year head coach Jeff Voris, Bulldogs compiled an overall record of 6–5 with a mark of 4–4 in conference play, tying for sixth place in the PFL. Butler played home games at the Bud and Jackie Sellick Bowl in Indianapolis.

== Schedule ==
Date	Time	Opponent	Site	TV	Result	Attendance
September 2	7:30 p.m.	at No. 20 Illinois State*	Hancock Stadium; Normal, IL	ESPN3	L 0–45	10,840
September 9	6:00 p.m.	at Franklin (IN)*	Faught Stadium; Franklin, IN	GrizTV	W 43–24	1,789
September 16	6:30 p.m.	Taylor*	Bud and Jackie Sellick Bowl; Indianapolis, IN	FB Live	W 27–21	4,112
September 23	4:00 p.m.	at San Diego	Torero Stadium; San Diego, CA	The W.TV via Stadium	L 17–38	1,701
September 30	1:00 p.m.	Drake	Bud and Jackie Sellick Bowl; Indianapolis, IN	FB Live	L 16–27	2,387
October 7	1:00 p.m.	at Morehead State	Jayne Stadium; Morehead, KY	OVCDN	W 44–6	4,465
October 14	1:00 p.m.	Jacksonville	Bud and Jackie Sellick Bowl; Indianapolis, IN	FB Live	W 37–22	1,877
October 21	1:00 p.m.	Campbell^{†}	Bud and Jackie Sellick Bowl; Indianapolis, IN	FB Live	W 37–23	4,139
October 28	1:00 p.m.	at Dayton	Welcome Stadium; Dayton, OH	FB Live	L 22–27	2,043
November 4	4:00 p.m.	at Stetson	Spec Martin Stadium; DeLand, FL	ESPN3	W 23–6	2,512
November 11	1:00 p.m.	Valparaiso	Bud and Jackie Sellick Bowl; Indianapolis, IN (Hoosier Helmet Trophy)	FB Live	L 28–36	3,661
*Non-conference game; ^{†}Homecoming; Rankings from STATS Poll released prior to the game; All times are in Eastern time

== Game summaries ==
=== At No. 20 Illinois State ===
	1	2	3	4	Total
Bulldogs	0	0	0	0	0
No. 20 Redbirds	0	17	21	7	45

=== At Franklin ===
	1	2	3	4	Total
Bulldogs	23	10	10	0	43
Grizzlies	6	10	8	0	24

=== Taylor ===
	1	2	3	4	Total
Trojans	7	7	0	7	21
Bulldogs	10	10	0	7	27

=== At San Diego ===
	1	2	3	4	Total
Bulldogs	7	7	3	0	17
Toreros	10	21	0	7	38

=== Drake ===
	1	2	3	4	Total
DU Bulldogs	7	14	3	3	27
BU Bulldogs	6	7	3	0	16

=== At Morehead State ===
	1	2	3	4	Total
Bulldogs	14	10	14	6	44
Eagles	0	0	0	6	6

=== Jacksonville ===
	1	2	3	4	Total
Dolphins	0	15	0	7	22
Bulldogs	7	13	10	7	37

=== Campbell ===
	1	2	3	4	Total
Fighting Camels	0	7	10	6	23
Bulldogs	3	17	7	10	37

=== At Dayton ===
	1	2	3	4	Total
Bulldogs	6	16	0	0	22
Flyers	7	3	10	7	27

=== At Stetson ===
	1	2	3	4	Total
Bulldogs	0	7	7	9	23
Hatters	6	0	0	0	6

=== Valparaiso ===
	1	2	3	4	Total
Crusaders	17	7	6	6	36
Bulldogs	3	14	6	11	34
