= 2017 Missouri State Bears football team =

American college football season

2017 Missouri State Bears football
- Conference: Missouri Valley Football Conference
- Record: 3–8 (2–6 MVFC)
- Head coach: Dave Steckel (3rd season)
- Co-offensive coordinators: Sean Coughlin (2nd season); Mack Brown (2nd season)
- Offensive scheme: Multiple
- Defensive coordinator: Marcus Yokeley (3rd season)
- Base defense: 4–3
- Captains: Jared Beshore; Malik Earl; Erik Furmanek; Colby Isbell
- Home stadium: Robert W. Plaster Stadium

2017 Missouri Valley Football Conference standings
| | Conf. | | | Overall |
| Team | W | | L | W | | L |
|---|---|---|---|---|---|---|
| No. 1 North Dakota State $^ | 7 | – | 1 | 14 | – | 1 |
| No. 3 South Dakota State ^ | 6 | – | 2 | 11 | – | 3 |
| No. 19 Northern Iowa ^ | 6 | – | 2 | 8 | – | 5 |
| No. 13 Western Illinois ^ | 5 | – | 3 | 8 | – | 4 |
| No. 15 South Dakota ^ | 4 | – | 4 | 8 | – | 5 |
| Illinois State | 4 | – | 4 | 6 | – | 5 |
| Youngstown State | 4 | – | 4 | 6 | – | 5 |
| Southern Illinois | 2 | – | 6 | 4 | – | 7 |
| Missouri State | 2 | – | 6 | 3 | – | 8 |
| Indiana State | 0 | – | 8 | 0 | – | 11 |
$ – Conference champion; ^ – FCS playoff participant; Rankings from STATS Poll

The 2017 Missouri State Bears football team represented Missouri State University as a member of the Missouri Valley Football Conference (MVFC) during the 2017 NCAA Division I FCS football season. Led by third-year head coach Dave Steckel, the Bears compiled an overall record of 3–8 with a mark of 2–6 in conference play, tying for eighth place in the MVFC. Missouri State played home games at Robert W. Plaster Stadium in Springfield, Missouri.

== Schedule ==
| Date | Time | Opponent | Site | TV | Result | Attendance |
|---|---|---|---|---|---|---|
| September 2 | 11:00 a.m. | at Missouri* | Faurot Field; Columbia, MO | SECN | L 43–72 | 50,131 |
| September 9 | 4:00 p.m. | at No. 11 North Dakota* | Alerus Center; Grand Forks, ND | Midco | L 0–34 | 12,047 |
| September 16 | 2:00 p.m. | Murray State* | Robert W. Plaster Stadium; Springfield, MO | ESPN3, KOZL-TV | W 28–21 | 13,648 |
| September 23 | 2:00 p.m. | No. 14 Illinois State | Robert W. Plaster Stadium; Springfield, MO | ESPN3 | L 9–34 | 7,183 |
| September 30 | 1:00 p.m. | at No. 2 North Dakota State | Fargodome; Fargo, ND | ESPN3 | L 11–38 | 18,892 |
| October 14 | 3:00 p.m. | at No. 14 Western Illinois | Hanson Field; Macomb, IL | ESPN3 | L 30–49 | 3,217 |
| October 21 | 2:00 p.m. | No. 13 South Dakota State | Robert W. Plaster Stadium; Springfield, MO | ESPN3 | L 30–62 | 6,253 |
| October 28 | 2:00 p.m. | Indiana State^{†} | Robert W. Plaster Stadium; Springfield, MO | ESPN3 | W 59–20 | 8,732 |
| November 4 | 1:00 p.m. | at Southern Illinois | Saluki Stadium; Carbondale, IL | ESPN3 | W 36–28 | 5,235 |
| November 11 | 2:00 p.m. | No. 25 Northern Iowa | Robert W. Plaster Stadium; Springfield, MO | ESPN3 | L 10–25 | 6,157 |
| November 18 | 11:00 a.m. | at Youngstown State | Stambaugh Stadium; Youngstown, OH | ESPN3 | L 10–38 | 9,362 |
*Non-conference game; ^{†}Homecoming; Rankings from STATS Poll released prior to the game; All times are in Central time

== Game summaries ==
=== At Missouri ===
| | 1 | 2 | 3 | 4 | Total |
|---|---|---|---|---|---|
| Bears | 21 | 14 | 0 | 8 | 43 |
| Tigers | 20 | 28 | 10 | 14 | 72 |

=== At North Dakota ===
| | 1 | 2 | 3 | 4 | Total |
|---|---|---|---|---|---|
| Bears | 0 | 0 | 0 | 0 | 0 |
| No. 11 Fighting Hawks | 3 | 21 | 0 | 10 | 34 |

=== Murray State ===
| | 1 | 2 | 3 | 4 | Total |
|---|---|---|---|---|---|
| Racers | 10 | 0 | 8 | 3 | 21 |
| Bears | 0 | 7 | 14 | 7 | 28 |

=== Illinois State ===
| | 1 | 2 | 3 | 4 | Total |
|---|---|---|---|---|---|
| No. 14 Redbirds | 3 | 3 | 28 | 0 | 34 |
| Bears | 6 | 0 | 0 | 3 | 9 |

=== At North Dakota State ===
| | 1 | 2 | 3 | 4 | Total |
|---|---|---|---|---|---|
| Bears | 0 | 5 | 0 | 6 | 11 |
| No. 2 Bison | 14 | 3 | 7 | 14 | 38 |

=== At Western Illinois ===
| | 1 | 2 | 3 | 4 | Total |
|---|---|---|---|---|---|
| Bears | 14 | 7 | 3 | 6 | 30 |
| No. 14 Leathernecks | 7 | 6 | 15 | 21 | 49 |

=== South Dakota State ===
| | 1 | 2 | 3 | 4 | Total |
|---|---|---|---|---|---|
| No. 13 Jackrabbits | 20 | 14 | 14 | 14 | 62 |
| Bears | 10 | 17 | 0 | 3 | 30 |

=== Indiana State ===
| | 1 | 2 | 3 | 4 | Total |
|---|---|---|---|---|---|
| Sycamores | 0 | 6 | 14 | 0 | 20 |
| Bears | 17 | 21 | 14 | 7 | 59 |

=== At Southern Illinois ===
| | 1 | 2 | 3 | 4 | Total |
|---|---|---|---|---|---|
| Bears | 24 | 3 | 0 | 9 | 36 |
| Salukis | 7 | 7 | 7 | 7 | 28 |

=== Northern Iowa ===
| | 1 | 2 | 3 | 4 | Total |
|---|---|---|---|---|---|
| No. 25 Panthers | 6 | 16 | 0 | 3 | 25 |
| Bears | 0 | 7 | 3 | 0 | 10 |

=== At Youngstown State ===
| | 1 | 2 | 3 | 4 | Total |
|---|---|---|---|---|---|
| Bears | 0 | 0 | 3 | 7 | 10 |
| Penguins | 10 | 14 | 0 | 14 | 38 |
