= 2017 Western Illinois Leathernecks football team =

American college football season

2017 Western Illinois Leathernecks football

NCAA Division I First Round, L 19–21 vs. Weber State
- Conference: Missouri Valley Football Conference

Ranking
- STATS: No. 13
- FCS Coaches: No. 12
- Record: 8–4 (5–3 MVFC)
- Head coach: Charlie Fisher (2nd season)
- Co-offensive coordinators: Doug Malone (2nd season); Jared Elliott (1st season)
- Defensive coordinator: Tony Grantham (1st season)
- Home stadium: Hanson Field

2017 Missouri Valley Football Conference standings
	Conf.			Overall
Team	W		L	W		L
No. 1 North Dakota State $^	7	–	1	14	–	1
No. 3 South Dakota State ^	6	–	2	11	–	3
No. 19 Northern Iowa ^	6	–	2	8	–	5
No. 13 Western Illinois ^	5	–	3	8	–	4
No. 15 South Dakota ^	4	–	4	8	–	5
Illinois State	4	–	4	6	–	5
Youngstown State	4	–	4	6	–	5
Southern Illinois	2	–	6	4	–	7
Missouri State	2	–	6	3	–	8
Indiana State	0	–	8	0	–	11
$ – Conference champion; ^ – FCS playoff participant; Rankings from STATS Poll

The 2017 Western Illinois Leathernecks football team represented Western Illinois University as a member of the Missouri Valley Football Conference (MVFC) during the 2017 NCAA Division I FCS football season. Led by Charlie Fisher in his second and final season as head coach, the Leathernecks compiled an overall record of 8–4, with a mark of 5–3 in conference play, placing fourth in the MVFC. Western Illinois received an at-large bid to NCAA Division I Football Championship playoffs, where the Leathernecks lost to Weber State in the first round. The team played home games at Hanson Field in Macomb, Illinois.

On December 22, Fisher resigned to become the wide receivers coach at Arizona State. He finished at Western Illinois with a two-year record of 14–9.

== Schedule ==
Date	Time	Opponent	Rank	Site	TV	Result	Attendance
August 31	6:00 p.m.	at Tennessee Tech*	No. 25	Tucker Stadium; Cookeville, TN	OVCDN	W 41–14	7,886
September 9	6:00 p.m.	at Northern Arizona*	No. 22	Walkup Skydome; Flagstaff, AZ	Pluto TV	W 38–20	9,053
September 23	5:30 p.m.	at Coastal Carolina*	No. 19	Brooks Stadium; Conway, SC	ESPN3	W 52–10	14,996
September 30	3:00 p.m.	No. 10 South Dakota^{†}	No. 13	Hanson Field; Macomb, IL	ESPN3	L 33–38	5,631
October 7	4:00 p.m.	at Northern Iowa	No. 15	UNI-Dome; Cedar Falls, IA	ESPN3	W 38–29	12,642
October 14	3:00 p.m.	Missouri State	No. 14	Hanson Field; Macomb, IL	ESPN3	W 49–30	3,217
October 21	2:30 p.m.	at No. 2 North Dakota State	No. 10	Fargodome; Fargo, ND	ESPN3	L 12–24	18,630
October 28	1:00 p.m.	No. 11 South Dakota State	No. 12	Hanson Field; Macomb, IL	ESPN3	L 24–52	2,247
November 4	12:00 p.m.	at No. 12 Illinois State	No. 15	Hancock Stadium; Normal, IL	ESPN3	W 31–14	13,192
November 11	12:00 p.m.	at Indiana State	No. 11	Memorial Stadium; Terre Haute, IN	ESPN3	W 45–0	3,173
November 18	1:00 p.m.	Southern Illinois	No. 9	Hanson Field; Macomb, IL	ESPN3	W 28–14	2,812
November 25	3:00 p.m.	at No. 11 Weber State*	No. 9	Stewart Stadium; Ogden, UT (NCAA Division I First Round)	ESPN3	L 19–21	6,876
*Non-conference game; ^{†}Homecoming; Rankings from STATS Poll released prior to the game; All times are in Central time

== Rankings ==
Ranking movements Legend: ██ Increase in ranking ██ Decrease in ranking RV = Received votes
	Week													
Poll	Pre	1	2	3	4	5	6	7	8	9	10	11	12	Final
STATS FCS	25	22	20	19	13	15	14	10	12	15	11	9	9	13
Coaches	RV	RV	22	21	16	18	17	12	14	18	13	10	10	12

== Game summaries ==
=== At Tennessee Tech ===
	1	2	3	4	Total
No. 25 Leathernecks	3	7	24	7	41
Golden Eagles	0	0	0	14	14

=== At Northern Arizona ===
	1	2	3	4	Total
No. 22 Leathernecks	7	10	14	7	38
Lumberjacks	0	7	6	7	20

=== At Coastal Carolina ===
	1	2	3	4	Total
No. 19 Leathernecks	7	14	21	10	52
Chanticleers	10	0	0	0	10

=== South Dakota ===
	1	2	3	4	Total
No. 10 Coyotes	7	17	14	0	38
No. 13 Leathernecks	0	6	14	13	33

=== At Northern Iowa ===
	1	2	3	4	Total
No. 15 Leathernecks	3	2	13	20	38
Panthers	0	14	0	15	29

=== Missouri State ===
	1	2	3	4	Total
Bears	14	7	3	6	30
No. 14 Leathernecks	7	6	15	21	49

=== At North Dakota State ===
	1	2	3	4	Total
No. 10 Leathernecks	9	3	0	0	12
No. 2 Bison	3	7	14	0	24

=== South Dakota State ===
	1	2	3	4	Total
No. 11 Jackrabbits	10	14	21	7	52
No. 12 Leathernecks	10	7	0	7	24

=== At Illinois State ===
	1	2	3	4	Total
No. 15 Leathernecks	0	0	17	14	31
No. 12 Redbirds	7	7	0	0	14

=== At Indiana State ===
	1	2	3	4	Total
No. 11 Leathernecks	3	28	7	7	45
Sycamores	0	0	0	0	0

=== Southern Illinois ===
	1	2	3	4	Total
Salukis	0	0	0	14	14
No. 9 Leathernecks	0	14	7	7	28

=== At Weber State—NCAA Division I First Round ===
	1	2	3	4	Total
No. 9 Leathernecks	3	3	6	7	19
No. 11 Wildcats	0	14	0	7	21
