= 2017 Indiana State Sycamores football team =

American college football season

2017 Indiana State Sycamores football
- Conference: Missouri Valley Football Conference
- Record: 0–11 (0–8 MVFC)
- Head coach: Curt Mallory (1st season)
- Offensive coordinator: Jeff Hecklinski (1st season)
- Offensive scheme: Pro-style
- Defensive coordinator: Brad Wilson (1st season)
- Base defense: 4–3
- Home stadium: Memorial Stadium

2017 Missouri Valley Football Conference standings
	Conf.			Overall
Team	W		L	W		L
No. 1 North Dakota State $^	7	–	1	14	–	1
No. 3 South Dakota State ^	6	–	2	11	–	3
No. 19 Northern Iowa ^	6	–	2	8	–	5
No. 13 Western Illinois ^	5	–	3	8	–	4
No. 15 South Dakota ^	4	–	4	8	–	5
Illinois State	4	–	4	6	–	5
Youngstown State	4	–	4	6	–	5
Southern Illinois	2	–	6	4	–	7
Missouri State	2	–	6	3	–	8
Indiana State	0	–	8	0	–	11
$ – Conference champion; ^ – FCS playoff participant; Rankings from STATS Poll

The 2017 Indiana State Sycamores football team represented Indiana State University as a member of the Missouri Valley Football Conference (MVFC) during the 2017 NCAA Division I FCS football season. Led by first-year head coach Curt Mallory, the Sycamores compiled an overall record of 0–11 with a mark of 0–8 in conference play, placing last out of ten teams in the MVFC. Indiana State played home games at Memorial Stadium in Terre Haute, Indiana.

Prior to the season, on January 23, 2017, Mallory was hired as the 21st head coach in program history. He was previously the defensive backs coach and pass defense coordinator at Wyoming.

== Schedule ==
Date	Time	Opponent	Site	TV	Result	Attendance	Source
August 31	7:00 p.m.	Eastern Illinois*	Memorial Stadium; Terre Haute, IN	ESPN3	L 20–22	4,670	
September 9	4:00 p.m.	at No. 21 (FBS) Tennessee*	Neyland Stadium; Knoxville, TN	SECN	L 7–42	99,015	
September 16	6:00 p.m.	at No. 19 Liberty*	Williams Stadium; Lynchburg, VA	ESPN3/BSN	L 41–42	16,060	
September 30	7:30 p.m.	at No. 12 Illinois State	Hancock Stadium; Normal, IL	ESPN3	L 13–24	13,391	
October 7	1:00 p.m.	No. 2 North Dakota State	Memorial Stadium; Terre Haute, IN	ESPN3	L 0–52	4,743	
October 14	3:00 p.m.	at No. 4 South Dakota	DakotaDome; Vermillion, SD	ESPN3	L 6–56	8,390	
October 21	3:00 p.m.	Southern Illinois^{†}	Memorial Stadium; Terre Haute, IN	ESPN3	L 24–45	6,811	
October 28	3:00 p.m.	at Missouri State	Robert W. Plaster Stadium; Springfield, MO	ESPN3	L 20–59	8,732	
November 4	1:00 p.m.	Youngstown State	Memorial Stadium; Terre Haute, IN		L 24–66	3,047	
November 11	1:00 p.m.	No. 11 Western Illinois	Memorial Stadium; Terre Haute, IN		L 0–45	3,173	
November 18	5:00 p.m.	at No. 24 Northern Iowa	UNI-Dome; Cedar Falls, IA	MVFC TV	L 3–41	8,232	
*Non-conference game; ^{†}Homecoming; Rankings from STATS Poll released prior to the game; All times are in Eastern time
