= 2017 Drake Bulldogs football team =

American college football season

2017 Drake Bulldogs football
- Conference: Pioneer Football League
- Record: 7–4 (6–2 PFL)
- Head coach: Rick Fox (4th season)
- Defensive coordinator: Todd Stepsis (4th season)
- Home stadium: Drake Stadium

2017 Pioneer Football League standings
	Conf.			Overall
Team	W		L	W		L
No. 23 San Diego $^	8	–	0	10	–	3
Drake	6	–	2	7	–	4
Jacksonville	5	–	3	7	–	4
Campbell	5	–	3	6	–	5
Valparaiso	5	–	3	6	–	5
Butler	4	–	4	6	–	5
Dayton	4	–	4	5	–	6
Marist	3	–	5	4	–	7
Morehead State	3	–	5	4	–	7
Stetson	1	–	7	2	–	9
Davidson	0	–	8	2	–	9
$ – Conference champion; ^ – FCS playoff participant; Rankings from STATS Poll

The 2017 Drake Bulldogs football team represented Drake University as a member of the Pioneer Football League (PFL) during 2017 NCAA Division I FCS football season. Led by fourth-year head coach Rick Fox, the Bulldogs compiled an overall record of 7–4 with a mark of 6–2 in conference play, placing second in the PFL. The team played its home games at Drake Stadium in Des Moines, Iowa.

== Schedule ==
Date	Time	Opponent	Site	TV	Result	Attendance
September 2	6:00 p.m.	South Dakota*	Drake Stadium; Des Moines, IA	BV	L 7–77	3,332
September 9	6:00 p.m.	Southwestern (KS)*	Drake Stadium; Des Moines, IA	BV	W 55–14	864
September 16	6:00 p.m.	at No. 4 South Dakota State*	Dana J. Dykhouse Stadium; Brookings, SD	ESPN3	L 10–51	15,806
September 23	1:00 p.m.	Valparaiso^{†}	Drake Stadium; Des Moines, IA	BV	W 38–13	2,956
September 30	12:00 p.m.	at Butler	Bud and Jackie Sellick Bowl; Indianapolis, IN	Facebook Live	W 27–16	2,387
October 7	1:00 p.m.	Dayton	Drake Stadium; Des Moines, IA (rivalry)	BV	L 10–20	1,734
October 21	12:00 p.m.	at Marist	Tenney Stadium at Leonidoff Field; Poughkeepsie, NY		W 19–14	1,318
October 28	1:00 p.m.	Davidson	Drake Stadium; Des Moines, IA	BV	W 17–12	1,406
November 4	4:00 p.m.	at San Diego	Torero Stadium; San Diego, CA	TheW.tv via STADIUM	L 15–45	1,582
November 11	12:00 p.m.	at Campbell	Barker–Lane Stadium; Buies Creek, NC	BSN	W 45–10	4,261
November 18	1:00 p.m.	Jacksonville	Drake Stadium; Des Moines, IA	BV	W 52–7	1,487
*Non-conference game; ^{†}Homecoming; Rankings from STATS Poll released prior to the game; All times are in Central time

== Game summaries ==
=== South Dakota ===
	1	2	3	4	Total
Coyotes	28	28	7	14	77
Bulldogs	0	7	0	0	7

=== Southwestern (KS) ===
	1	2	3	4	Total
Moundbuilders	0	14	0	0	14
Bulldogs	7	21	10	17	55

=== At South Dakota State ===
	1	2	3	4	Total
Bulldogs	0	3	7	0	10
No. 4 Jackrabbits	12	29	7	3	51

=== Valparaiso ===
	1	2	3	4	Total
Crusaders	6	7	0	0	13
Bulldogs	14	3	14	7	38

=== At Butler ===
	1	2	3	4	Total
DU Bulldogs	7	14	3	3	27
BU Bulldogs	6	7	3	0	16

=== Dayton ===
	1	2	3	4	Total
Flyers	0	3	14	3	20
Bulldogs	3	0	0	7	10

=== At Marist ===
	1	2	3	4	Total
Bulldogs	7	6	3	3	19
Red Foxes	0	7	0	7	14

=== Davidson ===
	1	2	3	4	Total
Wildcats	0	3	3	6	12
Bulldogs	7	7	0	3	17

=== At San Diego ===
	1	2	3	4	Total
Bulldogs	7	0	0	8	15
Toreros	7	10	7	21	45

=== At Campbell ===
	1	2	3	4	Total
Bulldogs	7	7	21	10	45
Fighting Camels	0	3	7	0	10

=== Jacksonville ===
	1	2	3	4	Total
Dolphins	0	7	0	0	7
Bulldogs	14	21	10	7	52
