= 2017 Youngstown State Penguins football team =

American college football season

2017 Youngstown State Penguins football
- Conference: Missouri Valley Football Conference
- Record: 6–5 (4–4 MVFC)
- Head coach: Bo Pelini (3rd season)
- Offensive coordinator: Shane Montgomery (8th season)
- Offensive scheme: Spread
- Defensive coordinator: Carl Pelini (3rd season)
- Base defense: 4–3
- Home stadium: Stambaugh Stadium

2017 Missouri Valley Football Conference standings
	Conf.			Overall
Team	W		L	W		L
No. 1 North Dakota State $^	7	–	1	14	–	1
No. 3 South Dakota State ^	6	–	2	11	–	3
No. 19 Northern Iowa ^	6	–	2	8	–	5
No. 13 Western Illinois ^	5	–	3	8	–	4
No. 15 South Dakota ^	4	–	4	8	–	5
Illinois State	4	–	4	6	–	5
Youngstown State	4	–	4	6	–	5
Southern Illinois	2	–	6	4	–	7
Missouri State	2	–	6	3	–	8
Indiana State	0	–	8	0	–	11
$ – Conference champion; ^ – FCS playoff participant; Rankings from STATS Poll

The 2017 Youngstown State Penguins football team represented Youngstown State University in the 2017 NCAA Division I FCS football season. They were led by third-year head coach Bo Pelini and played their home games at Stambaugh Stadium. They were a member of the Missouri Valley Football Conference. They finished the season 6–5, 4–4 in MVFC play to finish in a three-way tie for fifth place.

== Schedule ==
Date	Time	Opponent	Rank	Site	TV	Result	Attendance
September 2	1:00 p.m.	at Pittsburgh*	No. 9	Heinz Field; Pittsburgh, PA	ACCN Extra	L 21–28 ^{OT}	40,012
September 9	2:00 p.m.	Robert Morris*	No. 8	Stambaugh Stadium; Youngstown, OH	ESPN3	W 30–0	13,900
September 16	2:00 p.m.	Central Connecticut*	No. 6	Stambaugh Stadium; Youngstown, OH	ESPN3	W 59–9	15,377
September 30	7:00 p.m.	No. 4 South Dakota State	No. 6	Stambaugh Stadium; Youngstown, OH	ESPN3	W 19–7	17,450
October 7	3:00 p.m.	at No. 7 South Dakota	No. 3	DakotaDome; Vermillion, SD	ESPN3	L 28–31	10,056
October 14	7:00 p.m.	No. 2 North Dakota State	No. 8	Stambaugh Stadium; Youngstown, OH	ESPN3	L 24–27 ^{OT}	16,408
October 21	2:00 p.m.	at Northern Iowa	No. 9	UNI-Dome; Cedar Falls, IA	ESPN3	L 14–19	12,146
October 28	2:00 p.m.	No. 16 Illinois State^{†}	No. 21	Stambaugh Stadium; Youngstown, OH	ESPN3	L 0–35	12,723
November 4	2:00 p.m.	at Indiana State		Memorial Stadium; Terre Haute, IN	ESPN3	W 66–24	3,047
November 11	1:00 p.m.	at Southern Illinois		Saluki Stadium; Carbondale, IL	ESPN3	W 28–20	3,147
November 18	12:00 p.m.	Missouri State		Stambaugh Stadium; Youngstown, OH	ESPN3	W 38–10	9,362
*Non-conference game; ^{†}Homecoming; Rankings from STATS Poll released prior to the game; All times are in Eastern time

== Game summaries ==
=== At Pittsburgh ===
	1	2	3	4	OT	Total
No. 9 Penguins	0	0	7	14	0	21
Panthers	14	7	0	0	7	28

=== Robert Morris ===
	1	2	3	4	Total
Colonials	0	0	0	0	0
No. 8 Penguins	6	7	3	14	30

=== Central Connecticut ===
	1	2	3	4	Total
Blue Devils	0	0	6	3	9
No. 6 Penguins	14	17	21	7	59

=== South Dakota State ===
	1	2	3	4	Total
No. 4 Jackrabbits	0	7	0	0	7
No. 6 Penguins	7	7	2	3	19

=== At South Dakota ===
	1	2	3	4	Total
No. 3 Penguins	7	7	7	7	28
No. 7 Coyotes	7	14	7	3	31

=== North Dakota State ===
	1	2	3	4	OT	Total
No. 2 Bison	0	10	7	7	3	27
No. 8 Penguins	10	0	7	7	0	24

=== At Northern Iowa ===
	1	2	3	4	Total
No. 9 Penguins	0	7	0	7	14
Panthers	3	13	3	0	19

=== Illinois State ===
	1	2	3	4	Total
No. 16 Redbirds	14	7	7	7	35
No. 21 Penguins	0	0	0	0	0

=== At Indiana State ===
	1	2	3	4	Total
Penguins	28	10	14	14	66
Sycamores	7	17	0	0	24

=== At Southern Illinois ===
	1	2	3	4	Total
Penguins	0	14	7	7	28
Salukis	0	7	10	3	20

=== Missouri State ===
	1	2	3	4	Total
Bears	0	0	3	7	10
Penguins	10	14	0	14	38

== Ranking movements ==
Ranking movements Legend: ██ Increase in ranking ██ Decrease in ranking — = Not ranked RV = Received votes т = Tied with team above or below
	Week													
Poll	Pre	1	2	3	4	5	6	7	8	9	10	11	12	Final
STATS FCS	9	8	6	6	6	3	8	9	21	RV	RV	RV	RV	RV
Coaches	8	6–T	5	5	5–T	3	8	9	19	RV	—	—	—	—
