= 2017 Stetson Hatters football team =

American college football season

2017 Stetson Hatters football
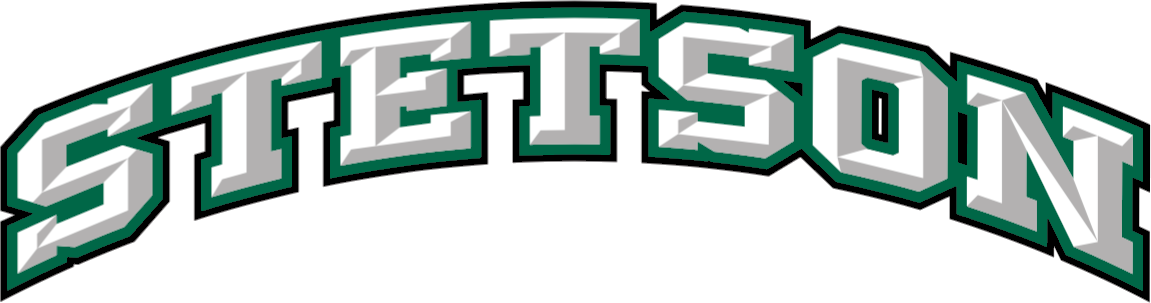
- Conference: Pioneer Football League
- Record: 2–9 (1–7 PFL)
- Head coach: Roger Hughes (5th season)
- Defensive coordinator: Brian Young (5th season)
- Home stadium: Spec Martin Stadium

2017 Pioneer Football League standings
	Conf.			Overall
Team	W		L	W		L
No. 23 San Diego $^	8	–	0	10	–	3
Drake	6	–	2	7	–	4
Jacksonville	5	–	3	7	–	4
Campbell	5	–	3	6	–	5
Valparaiso	5	–	3	6	–	5
Butler	4	–	4	6	–	5
Dayton	4	–	4	5	–	6
Marist	3	–	5	4	–	7
Morehead State	3	–	5	4	–	7
Stetson	1	–	7	2	–	9
Davidson	0	–	8	2	–	9
$ – Conference champion; ^ – FCS playoff participant; Rankings from STATS Poll

The 2017 Stetson Hatters football team represented Stetson University as a member of the Pioneer Football League (PFL) during the 2017 NCAA Division I FCS football season. Led by fifth-year head coach Roger Hughes, the Hatters compiled an overall record of 2–9 with a mark of 1–7 in conference play, placing tenth in the PFL. Stetson played home games at Spec Martin Stadium on DeLand, Florida.

== Schedule ==
Date	Time	Opponent	Site	TV	Result	Attendance
September 2	6:00 p.m.	at Sacred Heart*	Campus Field; Fairfield, CT	NECFR	L 3–42	2,992
September 9	1:00 p.m.	at Marist	Tenney Stadium at Leonidoff Field; Poughkeepsie, NY	RFN	L 17–38	2,297
September 16	6:00 p.m.	Dartmouth*	Spec Martin Stadium; DeLand, FL	ESPN3	L 7–38	2,435
September 23	4:00 p.m.	Campbell	Spec Martin Stadium; DeLand, FL	ESPN3	L 21–49	2,316
September 30	1:00 p.m.	at Valparaiso	Brown Field; Vaplaraiso, IN	HV	L 24–27	4,492
October 7	1:00 p.m.	Brown*	Spec Martin Stadium; DeLand, FL	ESPN3	W 17–13	1,689
October 14	1:00 p.m.	Davidson	Spec Martin Stadium; DeLand, FL	ESPN3	W 28–17	1,836
October 21	1:00 p.m.	at Morehead State	Jayne Stadium; Morehead, KY	OVCDN	L 26–29	8,987
October 28	1:00 p.m.	San Diego	Spec Martin Stadium; DeLand, FL	ESPN3	L 7–48	1,520
November 4	4:00 p.m.	Butler	Spec Martin Stadium; DeLand, FL	ESPN3	L 6–23	2,512
November 11	1:00 p.m.	at Jacksonville	D. B. Milne Field; Jacksonville, FL	ESPN3	L 10–13	1,855
*Non-conference game; All times are in Eastern time

== Game summaries ==
=== At Sacred Heart ===
	1	2	3	4	Total
Hatters	0	3	0	0	3
Pioneers	21	7	14	0	42

=== At Marist ===
	1	2	3	4	Total
Hatters	0	14	0	3	17
Red Wolves	0	7	10	21	38

=== Dartmouth ===
	1	2	3	4	Total
Big Green	0	10	21	7	38
Hatters	0	7	0	0	7

=== Campbell ===
	1	2	3	4	Total
Fighting Camels	28	14	0	7	49
Hatters	0	7	7	7	21

=== At Valparaiso ===
	1	2	3	4	Total
Hatters	0	13	3	8	24
Crusaders	10	10	0	7	27

=== Brown ===
	1	2	3	4	Total
Bears	0	7	0	6	13
Hatters	3	7	7	0	17

=== Davidson ===
	1	2	3	4	Total
Wildcats	7	3	7	0	17
Hatters	7	0	7	14	28

=== At Morehead State ===
	1	2	3	4	Total
Hatters	0	10	10	6	26
Eagles	14	7	0	8	29

=== San Diego ===
	1	2	3	4	Total
Toreros	7	17	21	3	48
Hatters	7	0	0	0	7

=== Butler ===
	1	2	3	4	Total
Bulldogs	0	7	7	9	23
Hatters	6	0	0	0	6

=== At Jacksonville ===
	1	2	3	4	Total
Hatters	3	0	0	7	10
Dolphins	0	6	0	7	13
