= 2017 Marist Red Foxes football team =

American college football season

2017 Marist Red Foxes football
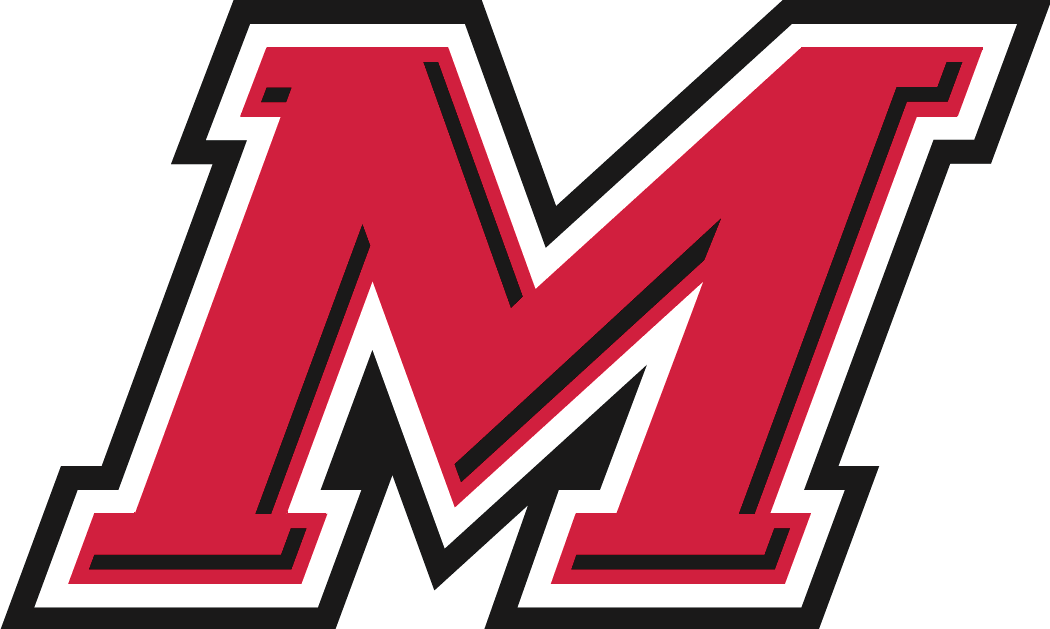
- Conference: Pioneer Football League
- Record: 4–7 (3–5 PFL)
- Head coach: Jim Parady (26th season)
- Offensive coordinator: Marc Bourque (1st season)
- Defensive coordinator: Scott Rumsey (17th season)
- Home stadium: Tenney Stadium at Leonidoff Field

2017 Pioneer Football League standings
	Conf.			Overall
Team	W		L	W		L
No. 23 San Diego $^	8	–	0	10	–	3
Drake	6	–	2	7	–	4
Jacksonville	5	–	3	7	–	4
Campbell	5	–	3	6	–	5
Valparaiso	5	–	3	6	–	5
Butler	4	–	4	6	–	5
Dayton	4	–	4	5	–	6
Marist	3	–	5	4	–	7
Morehead State	3	–	5	4	–	7
Stetson	1	–	7	2	–	9
Davidson	0	–	8	2	–	9
$ – Conference champion; ^ – FCS playoff participant; Rankings from STATS Poll

The 2017 Marist Red Foxes football team represented Marist College as a member of the Pioneer Football League (PFL) during the 2017 NCAA Division I FCS football season. Led by 26th-year head coach Jim Parady, the Red Foxes compiled an overall record of 4–7 with a mark of 3–5 in conference play, tying for eighth place in the PFL. Marist played home games at Tenney Stadium at Leonidoff Field in Poughkeepsie, New York.

== Schedule ==
Date	Time	Opponent	Site	TV	Result	Attendance
September 2	6:00 p.m.	at Bucknell*	Christy Mathewson–Memorial Stadium; Lewisburg, PA	Stadium	L 6–45	3,024
September 9	1:00 p.m.	Stetson	Tenney Stadium at Leonidoff Field; Poughkeepsie, NY	RFN	W 38–17	2,297
September 16	1:00 p.m.	at Georgetown*	Cooper Field; Washington, DC	Stadium	W 14–12	1,112
September 23	6:00 p.m.	Jacksonville	Tenney Stadium at Leonidoff Field; Poughkeepsie, NY	RFN	L 37–44	4,077
September 30	1:00 p.m.	at Davidson	Richardson Stadium; Davidson, NC		W 31–9	2,814
October 7	12:00 p.m.	Columbia*^{†}	Tenney Stadium at Leonidoff Field; Poughkeepsie, NY	RFN	L 17–41	2,396
October 14	2:00 p.m.	at Valparaiso	Brown Field; Vaplaraiso, IN		L 15–49	946
October 21	1:00 p.m.	Drake	Tenney Stadium at Leonidoff Field; Poughkeepsie, NY	RFN	L 14–19	1,318
November 4	1:00 p.m.	at Dayton	Welcome Stadium; Dayton, OH		L 17–36	2,583
November 11	12:00 p.m.	Morehead State	Tenney Stadium at Leonidoff Field; Poughkeepsie, NY	RFN	W 38–31	1,356
November 18	5:00 p.m.	at San Diego	Torero Stadium; San Diego, CA		L 7–35	2,119
*Non-conference game; ^{†}Homecoming; All times are in Eastern time

== Game summaries ==
=== At Bucknell ===
	1	2	3	4	Total
Red Foxes	0	6	0	0	6
Bison	28	7	3	7	45

=== Stetson ===
	1	2	3	4	Total
Hatters	0	14	0	3	17
Red Foxes	0	7	10	21	38

=== At Georgetown ===
	1	2	3	4	Total
Red Foxes	7	7	0	0	14
Hoyas	0	0	6	6	12

=== Jacksonville ===
	1	2	3	4	Total
Dolphins	10	12	7	15	44
Red Foxes	0	9	7	21	37

=== At Davidson ===
	1	2	3	4	Total
Red Foxes	0	14	7	10	31
Wildcats	0	6	3	0	9

=== Columbia ===
	1	2	3	4	Total
Lions	21	17	0	3	41
Red Foxes	0	0	10	7	17

=== At Valparaiso ===
	1	2	3	4	Total
Red Foxes	3	0	6	6	15
Crusaders	7	7	21	14	49

=== Drake ===
	1	2	3	4	Total
Bulldogs	7	6	3	3	19
Red Foxes	0	7	0	7	14

=== At Dayton ===
	1	2	3	4	Total
Red Foxes	0	0	10	7	17
Flyers	20	10	0	6	36

=== Morehead State ===
	1	2	3	4	Total
Eagles	14	3	14	0	31
Red Foxes	10	7	7	14	38

=== At San Diego ===
	1	2	3	4	Total
Red Foxes	7	0	0	0	7
Toreros	14	7	7	7	35
