= 2017 Illinois State Redbirds football team =

American college football season

2017 Illinois State Redbirds football
- Conference: Missouri Valley Football Conference
- Record: 6–5 (4–4 MVFC)
- Head coach: Brock Spack (9th season)
- Co-offensive coordinators: Dan Clark (2nd season); Billy Dicken (2nd season)
- Defensive coordinator: Spence Nowinsky (4th season)
- MVPs: Dalton Keene; James Robinson
- Captains: Jake Kolbe; Dalton Keene; Brannon Barry
- Home stadium: Hancock Stadium

2017 Missouri Valley Football Conference standings
	Conf.			Overall
Team	W		L	W		L
No. 1 North Dakota State $^	7	–	1	14	–	1
No. 3 South Dakota State ^	6	–	2	11	–	3
No. 19 Northern Iowa ^	6	–	2	8	–	5
No. 13 Western Illinois ^	5	–	3	8	–	4
No. 15 South Dakota ^	4	–	4	8	–	5
Illinois State	4	–	4	6	–	5
Youngstown State	4	–	4	6	–	5
Southern Illinois	2	–	6	4	–	7
Missouri State	2	–	6	3	–	8
Indiana State	0	–	8	0	–	11
$ – Conference champion; ^ – FCS playoff participant; Rankings from STATS Poll

The 2017 Illinois State Redbirds football team represented Illinois State University as a member of the Missouri Valley Football Conference (MVFC) during the 2017 NCAA Division I FCS football season. Led by ninth-year head coach Brock Spack, the Redbirds compiled an overall record of 6–5 with a mark of 4–4 in conference play, placing in a three-way tie for fifth in the MVFC. Illinois State played home games at Hancock Stadium in Normal, Illinois.

== Schedule ==
Date	Time	Opponent	Rank	Site	TV	Result	Attendance
September 2	6:30 p.m.	Butler*	No. 20	Hancock Stadium; Normal, IL	ESPN3	W 45–0	10,840
September 16	2:00 p.m.	at Eastern Illinois*	No. 18	O'Brien Stadium; Charleston, IL (Mid-America Classic)	OVCDN	W 44–13	7,031
September 23	2:00 p.m.	at Missouri State	No. 14	Plaster Sports Complex; Springfield, MO	ESPN3	W 34–9	7,183
September 30	6:30 p.m.	Indiana State	No. 12	Hancock Stadium; Normal, IL	ESPN3	W 24–13	13,391
October 7	6:00 p.m.	at Northern Arizona*	No. 11	Walkup Skydome; Flagstaff, AZ	FCSP, Pluto TV	L 16–37	10,420
October 14	2:00 p.m.	at Southern Illinois	No. 17	Saluki Stadium; Carbondale, IL	ESPN3	L 7–42	8,121
October 21	2:00 p.m.	No. 4 South Dakota^{†}	No. 24	Hancock Stadium; Normal, IL	ESPN3, NBCS CH	W 37–21	12,113
October 28	1:00 p.m.	at No. 21 Youngstown State	No. 16	Stambaugh Stadium; Youngstown, OH	ESPN3	W 35–0	12,723
November 4	Noon	No. 15 Western Illinois	No. 12	Hancock Stadium; Normal, IL	ESPN3	L 14–31	13,192
November 11	2:00 p.m.	at No. 6 South Dakota State	No. 17	Dana J. Dykhouse Stadium; Brookings, SD	ESPN3	L 24–27 ^{OT}	9,458
November 18	Noon	No. 4 North Dakota State	No. 21	Hancock Stadium; Normal, IL	ESPN3; NBCS CH	L 7–20	7,664
*Non-conference game; ^{†}Homecoming; Rankings from STATS Poll released prior to the game; All times are in Central time

== Game summaries ==
=== Butler ===
	1	2	3	4	Total
Bulldogs	0	0	0	0	0
No. 20 Redbirds	0	17	21	7	45

=== At Eastern Illinois ===
	1	2	3	4	Total
No. 18 Redbirds	10	17	10	7	44
Panthers	0	6	7	0	13

=== At Missouri State ===
	1	2	3	4	Total
No. 14 Redbirds	3	3	28	0	34
Bears	6	0	0	3	9

=== Indiana State ===
	1	2	3	4	Total
Sycamores	0	0	13	0	13
No. 12 Redbirds	10	14	0	0	24

=== At Northern Arizona ===
	1	2	3	4	Total
No. 11 Redbirds	0	6	3	7	16
Lumberjacks	0	13	14	10	37

=== At Southern Illinois ===
	1	2	3	4	Total
No. 17 Redbirds	0	0	7	0	7
Salukis	7	14	7	14	42

=== South Dakota ===
	1	2	3	4	Total
No. 4 Coyotes	0	14	0	7	21
No. 24 Redbirds	14	3	7	13	37

=== At Youngstown State ===
	1	2	3	4	Total
No. 16 Redbirds	14	7	7	7	35
No. 21 Penguins	0	0	0	0	0

=== Western Illinois ===
	1	2	3	4	Total
No. 15 Leathernecks	0	0	17	14	31
No. 12 Redbirds	7	7	0	0	14

=== At South Dakota State ===
	1	2	3	4	OT	Total
No. 17 Redbirds	7	10	0	7	0	24
No. 6 Jackrabbits	7	10	0	7	3	27

=== North Dakota State ===
	1	2	3	4	Total
No. 4 Bison	0	0	13	7	20
No. 21 Redbirds	0	0	0	7	7

== Redbirds drafted ==
Draft Year	Player	Position	Round	Overall	NFL Team
2018	Davontae Harris	CB	5	151	Cincinnati Bengals

== Ranking movements ==
Ranking movements Legend: ██ Increase in ranking ██ Decrease in ranking — = Not ranked RV = Received votes т = Tied with team above or below
	Week													
Poll	Pre	1	2	3	4	5	6	7	8	9	10	11	12	Final
STATS FCS	20	18	18	14	12	11	17	24	16	12	17	21	23	RV
Coaches	18	15	14	12	8–T	7	15	24	21	13	20	25	RV	—
