= 2017 Dayton Flyers football team =

American college football season

2017 Dayton Flyers football
- Conference: Pioneer Football League
- Record: 5–6 (4–4 PFL)
- Head coach: Rick Chamberlin (10th season)
- Offensive coordinator: Austin King (1st season)
- Defensive coordinator: Landon Fox (8th season)
- Home stadium: Welcome Stadium

2017 Pioneer Football League standings
	Conf.			Overall
Team	W		L	W		L
No. 23 San Diego $^	8	–	0	10	–	3
Drake	6	–	2	7	–	4
Jacksonville	5	–	3	7	–	4
Campbell	5	–	3	6	–	5
Valparaiso	5	–	3	6	–	5
Butler	4	–	4	6	–	5
Dayton	4	–	4	5	–	6
Marist	3	–	5	4	–	7
Morehead State	3	–	5	4	–	7
Stetson	1	–	7	2	–	9
Davidson	0	–	8	2	–	9
$ – Conference champion; ^ – FCS playoff participant; Rankings from STATS Poll

The 2017 Dayton Flyers football team represented the University of Dayton as a member of the Pioneer Football League (PFL) during the 2017 NCAA Division I FCS football season. Led by tenth-year head coach Rick Chamberlin, the Flyers compiled an overall record of 5–6 with a mark of 4–4 in conference play, tying for fourth place in the PFL. Dayton played home games at Welcome Stadium in Dayton, Ohio.

== Schedule ==
Date	Time	Opponent	Site	TV	Result	Attendance
September 2	12:00 p.m.	at Robert Morris*	Joe Walton Stadium; Moon Township, PA	NECFR	L 10–13	1,929
September 9	1:00 p.m.	Southeast Missouri State*	Welcome Stadium; Dayton, OH	SSOH, YouTube	W 25–23	2,766
September 16	1:00 p.m.	Duquesne*	Welcome Stadium; Dayton, OH	SSOH, YouTube	L 23–28	5,753
September 23	1:00 p.m.	at Morehead State	Jayne Stadium; Morehead, KY	OVCDN	L 28–34	6,306
September 30	12:00 p.m.	San Diego	Welcome Stadium; Dayton, OH	SSOH, YouTube	L 7–23	3,032
October 7	2:00 p.m.	at Drake	Drake Stadium; Des Moines, IA (rivalry)		W 20–10	1,734
October 14	1:00 p.m.	Campbell	Welcome Stadium; Dayton, OH		L 7-17	2,592
October 21	1:00 p.m.	at Davidson	Richardson Stadium; Davidson, NC		W 48-22	2,712
October 28	1:00 p.m.	Butler	Welcome Stadium; Dayton, OH	FB Live	W 27–22	2,043
November 4	1:00 p.m.	Marist	Welcome Stadium; Dayton, OH	SSOH, YouTube	W 36–17	2,583
November 18	2:00 p.m.	at Valparaiso	Brown Field; Valparaiso, IN		L 7–8	1,238
*Non-conference game; All times are in Eastern time

== Game summaries ==
=== At Robert Morris ===
	1	2	3	4	Total
Flyers	7	3	0	0	10
Colonials	0	3	7	3	13

=== Southeast Missouri State ===
	1	2	3	4	Total
Redhawks	0	7	10	6	23
Flyers	10	3	3	9	25

=== Duquesne ===
	1	2	3	4	Total
Dukes	7	14	0	7	28
Flyers	7	7	3	6	23

=== At Morehead State ===
	1	2	3	4	Total
Flyers	7	14	0	7	28
Eagles	7	0	6	21	34

=== San Diego ===
	1	2	3	4	Total
Toreros	14	7	2	0	23
Flyers	0	7	0	0	7

=== At Drake ===
	1	2	3	4	Total
Flyers	0	3	14	3	20
Bulldogs	3	0	0	7	10

=== Campbell ===
	1	2	3	4	Total
Fighting Camels					0
Flyers					0

=== At Davidson ===
	1	2	3	4	Total
Flyers					0
Wildcats					0

=== Butler ===
	1	2	3	4	Total
Bulldogs					0
Flyers					0

=== Marist ===
	1	2	3	4	Total
Red Foxes	0	0	10	7	17
Flyers	20	10	0	6	36

=== At Valparaiso ===
	1	2	3	4	Total
Flyers	0	0	0	7	7
Crusaders	0	0	0	8	8
