= 2017 Northern Iowa Panthers football team =

American college football season

2017 Northern Iowa Panthers football

NCAA Division I Second Round, L 22–37 at South Dakota State
- Conference: Missouri Valley Football Conference

Ranking
- STATS: No. 19
- FCS Coaches: No. 19
- Record: 8–5 (6–2 MVFC)
- Head coach: Mark Farley (17th season)
- Offensive coordinator: Bill Salmon (17th season)
- Offensive scheme: Multiple
- Defensive coordinator: Jeremiah Johnson (5th season)
- Base defense: 3–4
- Home stadium: UNI-Dome

2017 Missouri Valley Football Conference standings
	Conf.			Overall
Team	W		L	W		L
No. 1 North Dakota State $^	7	–	1	14	–	1
No. 3 South Dakota State ^	6	–	2	11	–	3
No. 19 Northern Iowa ^	6	–	2	8	–	5
No. 13 Western Illinois ^	5	–	3	8	–	4
No. 15 South Dakota ^	4	–	4	8	–	5
Illinois State	4	–	4	6	–	5
Youngstown State	4	–	4	6	–	5
Southern Illinois	2	–	6	4	–	7
Missouri State	2	–	6	3	–	8
Indiana State	0	–	8	0	–	11
$ – Conference champion; ^ – FCS playoff participant; Rankings from STATS Poll

The 2017 Northern Iowa Panthers football team represented the University of Northern Iowa as a member of the Missouri Valley Football Conference (MVFC) during the 2017 NCAA Division I FCS football season. Led by 17th-year head coach Mark Farley, the Panthers compiled an overall record of 8–5 with a mark of 6–2 in conference play, tying for second place in the MVFC. Northern Iowa received an at-large bid to NCAA Division I Football Championship playoffs, where the Panthers defeated Monmouth in the first round before losing to South Dakota State in the second round. The team played home games at the UNI-Dome in Cedar Falls, Iowa.

== Schedule ==
Date	Time	Opponent	Rank	Site	TV	Result	Attendance	Source
September 2	7:00 p.m.	at Iowa State*	No. 18	Jack Trice Stadium; Ames, IA	Cyclones.tv	L 24–42	61,500	
September 9	4:00 p.m.	Cal Poly*	No. 21	UNI-Dome; Cedar Falls, IA	PSN (Note: Panther Sports Network involves these channels (CFU Ch. 15/HD415; KCRG-TV Ch. 9.2; WHO-DT Ch. 13.2; KGCW Ch. 26, (NBC Sports Chicago or NBC Sports Chicago Plus, KSMO/Charter Kansas City Ch. 62.1 (for KSMO))), ESPN3	W 45–38 ^{OT}	10,246	
September 16	7:00 p.m.	at Southern Utah*	No. 21	Eccles Coliseum; Cedar City, UT	Pluto TV	L 21–24	8,841	
September 30	6:00 p.m.	at Southern Illinois		Saluki Stadium; Carbondale, IL	ESPN3	W 24–17	9,112	
October 7	4:00 p.m.	No. 15 Western Illinois		UNI-Dome; Cedar Falls, IA	PSN, ESPN3	L 29–38	12,642	
October 14	2:00 p.m.	at No. 7 South Dakota State		Dana J. Dykhouse Stadium; Brookings, SD	ESPN3	W 38–18	14,347	
October 21	1:00 p.m.	No. 9 Youngstown State^{†}		UNI-Dome; Cedar Falls, IA	PSN, ESPN3	W 19–14	12,146	
October 28	2:30 p.m.	at No. 2 North Dakota State		Fargodome; Fargo, ND	ESPN3	L 14–30	18,687	
November 4	1:00 p.m.	No. 6 South Dakota		UNI-Dome; Cedar Falls, IA	PSN, ESPN3	W 34–29	10,814	
November 11	2:00 p.m.	at Missouri State	No. 25	Robert W. Plaster Stadium; Springfield, MO	ESPN3	W 25–10	6,157	
November 18	4:00 p.m.	Indiana State	No. 24	UNI-Dome; Cedar Falls, IA	PSN, ESPN3	W 41–3	8,232	
November 25	4:00 p.m.	Monmouth*	No. 20	UNI-Dome; Cedar Falls, IA (NCAA Division I First Round)	ESPN3	W 46–7	4,095	
December 2	4:00 p.m.	at No. 6 South Dakota State*	No. 20	Dana J. Dykhouse Stadium; Brookings, SD (NCAA Division I Second Round)	ESPN3	L 22–37	7,518	
*Non-conference game; ^{†}Homecoming; Rankings from STATS Poll released prior to the game; All times are in Central time

== Rankings ==
Ranking movements Legend: ██ Increase in ranking ██ Decrease in ranking RV = Received votes т = Tied with team above or below
	Week													
Poll	Pre	1	2	3	4	5	6	7	8	9	10	11	12	Final
STATS FCS	18	21	21	RV	RV	RV	RV	RV	RV	RV	25	24	20	19
Coaches	20	21–T	18	24	20	21	RV	RV	25	RV	RV	RV	21	19

== Panthers drafted ==
Draft Year	Player	Position	Round	Overall	NFL team
2018	Daurice Fountain	WR	5	159	Indianapolis Colts
