= 2017 South Dakota Coyotes football team =

American college football season

2017 South Dakota Coyotes football

FCS Playoffs Second Round, L 42–54 vs. Sam Houston State
- Conference: Missouri Valley Football Conference

Ranking
- STATS: No. 15
- FCS Coaches: No. 16
- Record: 8–5 (4–4 MVFC)
- Head coach: Bob Nielson (2nd season)
- Co-offensive coordinators: Ted Schlafke (2nd season); Bill O'Boyle (2nd season)
- Offensive scheme: Pro-style
- Co-defensive coordinators: Atiba Bradley (2nd season); Tyler Yelk (2nd season)
- Base defense: 4–3
- Home stadium: DakotaDome

2017 Missouri Valley Football Conference standings
	Conf.			Overall
Team	W		L	W		L
No. 1 North Dakota State $^	7	–	1	14	–	1
No. 3 South Dakota State ^	6	–	2	11	–	3
No. 19 Northern Iowa ^	6	–	2	8	–	5
No. 13 Western Illinois ^	5	–	3	8	–	4
No. 15 South Dakota ^	4	–	4	8	–	5
Illinois State	4	–	4	6	–	5
Youngstown State	4	–	4	6	–	5
Southern Illinois	2	–	6	4	–	7
Missouri State	2	–	6	3	–	8
Indiana State	0	–	8	0	–	11
$ – Conference champion; ^ – FCS playoff participant; Rankings from STATS Poll

The 2017 South Dakota Coyotes football team represented the University of South Dakota in the 2017 NCAA Division I FCS football season. They were led by second-year head coach Bob Nielson and played their home games in the DakotaDome. They were a member of the Missouri Valley Football Conference. They finished the season 8–5, 4–4 in MVFC play to finish in a three-way tie for fifth place. They received an at-large bid to the FCS Playoffs, which was the schools first ever FCS Playoff bid, where they defeated Nicholls State in the first round before losing to Sam Houston State in the second round.

== Schedule ==
Date	Time	Opponent	Rank	Site	TV	Result	Attendance
September 2	6:00 p.m.	at Drake*		Drake Stadium; Des Moines, IA	BV	W 77–7	3,332
September 9	5:00 p.m.	at Bowling Green*		Doyt Perry Stadium; Bowling Green, OH	ESPN3	W 35–27	17,912
September 16	2:00 p.m.	No. 10 North Dakota*	No. 23	DakotaDome; Vermillion, SD (Sitting Bull Trophy)	ESPN3; Midco	W 45–7	9,645
September 30	3:00 p.m.	at No. 13 Western Illinois	No. 10	Hanson Field; Macomb, IL	ESPN3; MVC TV	W 38–33	5,631
October 7	2:00 p.m.	No. 3 Youngstown State	No. 7	DakotaDome; Vermillion, SD	ESPN3; Midco	W 31–28	10,056
October 14	2:00 p.m.	Indiana State	No. 4	DakotaDome; Vermillion, SD	ESPN3; Midco	W 56–6	8,390
October 21	2:00 p.m.	at No. 24 Illinois State	No. 4	Hancock Stadium; Normal, IL	ESPN3; NBCS CH	L 21–37	12,113
October 28	3:00 p.m.	Southern Illinois	No. 6	DakotaDome; Vermillion, SD	ESPN3; Midco	W 42–0	8,498
November 4	1:00 p.m.	at Northern Iowa	No. 6	UNI-Dome; Cedar Falls, IA	ESPN3; PSN	L 29–34	10,814
November 11	2:30 p.m.	at No. 5 North Dakota State	No. 10	Fargodome; Fargo, ND	ESPN3; NBC ND	L 14–49	18,623
November 18	2:00 p.m.	No. 6 South Dakota State	No. 15	DakotaDome; Vermillion, SD (rivalry)	ESPN3; Midco	L 28–31	10,147
November 25	3:00 p.m.	at Nicholls State*	No. 16	John L. Guidry Stadium; Thibodaux, LA (NCAA Division I First Round)	ESPN3	W 38–31	9,612
December 2	2:00 p.m.	at No. 5 Sam Houston State*	No. 16	Bowers Stadium; Huntsville, TX (NCAA Division I Second Round)	ESPN3	L 42–54	4,401
*Non-conference game; Rankings from STATS FCS at time of game Poll released prior to the game; All times are in Central time

== Ranking movements ==
Ranking movements Legend: ██ Increase in ranking ██ Decrease in ranking RV = Received votes
	Week													
Poll	Pre	1	2	3	4	5	6	7	8	9	10	11	12	Final
STATS FCS	RV	RV	23	13	10	7	4	4	6	6	10	15	16	15
Coaches	RV	RV	23	14	10	6	4	4	7	6	10	16	18	16
