= 2017 Morehead State Eagles football team =

American college football season

2017 Morehead State Eagles football
- Conference: Pioneer Football League
- Record: 4–7 (3–5 PFL)
- Head coach: Rob Tenyer (5th season)
- Defensive coordinator: Zack Moore (2nd season)
- Home stadium: Jayne Stadium

2017 Pioneer Football League standings
	Conf.			Overall
Team	W		L	W		L
No. 23 San Diego $^	8	–	0	10	–	3
Drake	6	–	2	7	–	4
Jacksonville	5	–	3	7	–	4
Campbell	5	–	3	6	–	5
Valparaiso	5	–	3	6	–	5
Butler	4	–	4	6	–	5
Dayton	4	–	4	5	–	6
Marist	3	–	5	4	–	7
Morehead State	3	–	5	4	–	7
Stetson	1	–	7	2	–	9
Davidson	0	–	8	2	–	9
$ – Conference champion; ^ – FCS playoff participant; Rankings from STATS Poll

The 2017 Morehead State Eagles football team represented Morehead State University in the 2017 NCAA Division I FCS football season. They were led by fifth-year head coach Rob Tenyer and played their home games at Jayne Stadium. They were members of the Pioneer Football League. They finished the season 4–7, 3–5 in PFL play to finish in a tie for eighth place.

== Schedule ==
Date	Time	Opponent	Site	TV	Result	Attendance
August 31	6:00 p.m.	Kentucky Christian*	Jayne Stadium; Morehead, KY	OVCDN	W 56–14	5,846
September 9	6:00 p.m.	at No. 20 Liberty*	Williams Stadium; Lynchburg, VA	BSN	L 17–58	17,118
September 16	7:00 p.m.	at Austin Peay*	Fortera Stadium; Clarksville, TN	OVCDN	L 13–69	8,152
September 23	1:00 p.m.	Dayton	Jayne Stadium; Morehead, KY	OVCDN	W 34–28	6,306
September 30	2:00 p.m.	at Campbell	Barker–Lane Stadium; Buies Creek, NC	BSN	L 0–38	6,387
October 7	1:00 p.m.	Butler	Jayne Stadium; Morehead, KY	OVCDN	L 6–44	4,465
October 14	5:00 p.m.	at San Diego	Torero Stadium; San Diego, CA	The W.tv via STADIUM	L 27–56	3,062
October 21	1:00 p.m.	Stetson^{†}	Jayne Stadium; Morehead, KY	OVCDN	W 29–26	8,987
October 28	2:00 p.m.	at Valparaiso	Brown Field; Valparaiso, IN		L 32–63	2,277
November 11	12:00 p.m.	at Marist	Tenney Stadium at Leonidoff Field; Poughkeepsie, NY		L 31–38	1,356
November 18	1:00 p.m.	Davidson	Jayne Stadium; Morehead, KY		W 21–14	3,831
*Non-conference game; ^{†}Homecoming; Rankings from STATS Poll released prior to the game; All times are in Eastern time

== Game summaries ==
=== Kentucky Christian ===
	1	2	3	4	Total
Knights	0	7	7	0	14
Eagles	7	28	14	7	56

=== At Liberty ===
	1	2	3	4	Total
Eagles	0	10	7	0	17
No. 20 Flames	24	21	7	6	58

=== At Austin Peay ===
	1	2	3	4	Total
Eagles	0	7	0	6	13
Governors	14	28	13	14	69

=== Dayton ===
	1	2	3	4	Total
Flyers	7	14	0	7	28
Eagles	7	0	6	21	34

=== At Campbell ===
	1	2	3	4	Total
Eagles	0	0	0	0	0
Fighting Camels	0	17	14	7	38

=== Butler ===
	1	2	3	4	Total
Bulldogs	14	10	14	6	44
Eagles	0	0	0	6	6

=== At San Diego ===
	1	2	3	4	Total
Eagles	0	7	6	14	27
Toreros	28	21	7	0	56

=== Stetson ===
	1	2	3	4	Total
Hatters	0	10	10	6	26
Eagles	14	7	0	8	29

=== At Valparaiso ===
	1	2	3	4	Total
Eagles	0	6	12	14	32
Crusaders	21	21	14	7	63

=== At Marist ===
	1	2	3	4	Total
Eagles	14	3	14	0	31
Red Foxes	10	7	7	14	38

=== Davidson ===
	1	2	3	4	Total
Wildcats	0	0	14	0	14
Eagles	7	0	14	0	21
