= 2017 Jacksonville Dolphins football team =

American college football season

2017 Jacksonville Dolphins football
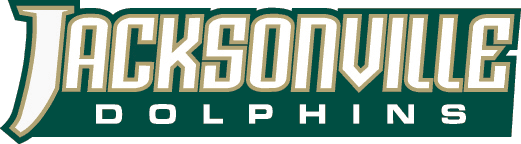
- Conference: Pioneer Football League
- Record: 7–4 (5–3 PFL)
- Head coach: Ian Shields (2nd season)
- Offensive coordinator: Ian Shields (2nd season)
- Defensive coordinator: Alan Darlin (1st season)
- Home stadium: D. B. Milne Field

2017 Pioneer Football League standings
	Conf.			Overall
Team	W		L	W		L
No. 23 San Diego $^	8	–	0	10	–	3
Drake	6	–	2	7	–	4
Jacksonville	5	–	3	7	–	4
Campbell	5	–	3	6	–	5
Valparaiso	5	–	3	6	–	5
Butler	4	–	4	6	–	5
Dayton	4	–	4	5	–	6
Marist	3	–	5	4	–	7
Morehead State	3	–	5	4	–	7
Stetson	1	–	7	2	–	9
Davidson	0	–	8	2	–	9
$ – Conference champion; ^ – FCS playoff participant; Rankings from STATS Poll

The 2017 Jacksonville Dolphins football team represented Jacksonville University in the 2017 NCAA Division I FCS football season. They were led by second-year head coach Ian Shields and played their home games at D. B. Milne Field. They were members of the Pioneer Football League (PFL). They finished the season 7–4, 5–3 in PFL play to finish in a three-way tie for third place.

== Schedule ==
Date	Time	Opponent	Site	TV	Result	Attendance
August 31	7:00 p.m.	at Mercer*	Moye Complex; Macon, GA	ESPN3	L 7–48	9,727
September 16	1:00 p.m.	Walsh*	D. B. Milne Field; Jacksonville, FL	ESPN3	W 56–31	1,508
September 23	6:00 p.m.	at Marist	Tenney Stadium at Leonidoff Field; Poughkeepsie, NY		W 44–37	4,077
September 30	1:00 p.m.	Guilford*	D. B. Milne Field; Jacksonville, FL	ESPN3	W 56–21	2,014
October 7	1:00 p.m.	Davidson^{†}	D. B. Milne Field; Jacksonville, FL	ESPN3	W 35–21	3,673
October 14	12:00 p.m.	at Butler	Butler Bowl; Indianapolis, IN		L 22–37	1,877
October 21	12:00 p.m.	San Diego	D. B. Milne Field; Jacksonville, FL	ESPN3	L 10–63	1,748
October 28	2:00 p.m.	at Campbell	Barker–Lane Stadium; Buies Creek, NC		W 54–48 ^{3OT}	6,691
November 4	12:00 p.m.	Valparaiso	D. B. Milne Field; Jacksonville, FL	ESPN3	W 20–17	1,738
November 11	1:00 p.m.	Stetson	D. B. Milne Field; Jacksonville, FL	ESPN3	W 13–10	1,855
November 18	2:00 p.m.	at Drake	Drake Stadium; Des Moines, IA		L 7–52	1,487
*Non-conference game; ^{†}Homecoming; All times are in Eastern time

- Source: Schedule

== Game summaries ==
=== At Mercer ===
	1	2	3	4	Total
Dolphins	0	0	0	7	7
Bears	14	13	21	0	48

=== Walsh ===
	1	2	3	4	Total
Cavaliers	3	0	14	14	31
Dolphins	14	21	14	7	56

=== At Marist ===
	1	2	3	4	Total
Dolphins	10	12	7	15	44
Red Foxes	0	9	7	21	37

=== Guilford ===
	1	2	3	4	Total
Quakers	7	0	7	7	21
Dolphins	28	14	7	7	56

=== Davidson ===
	1	2	3	4	Total
Wildcats	0	0	14	7	21
Dolphins	14	14	7	0	35

=== At Butler ===
	1	2	3	4	Total
Dolphins	0	15	0	7	22
Bulldogs	7	13	10	7	37

=== San Diego ===
	1	2	3	4	Total
Toreros	14	21	14	14	63
Dolphins	0	0	3	7	10

=== At Campbell ===
	1	2	3	4	OT	2OT	3OT	Total
Dolphins	0	10	14	10	7	7	6	54
Fighting Camels	10	7	14	3	7	7	0	48

=== Valparaiso ===
	1	2	3	4	Total
Crusaders	7	7	0	3	17
Dolphins	3	10	7	0	20

=== Stetson ===
	1	2	3	4	Total
Hatters	3	0	0	7	10
Dolphins	0	6	0	7	13

=== At Drake ===
	1	2	3	4	Total
Dolphins	0	7	0	0	7
Bulldogs	14	21	10	7	52
