= 2017 Campbell Fighting Camels football team =

American college football season

2017 Campbell Fighting Camels football
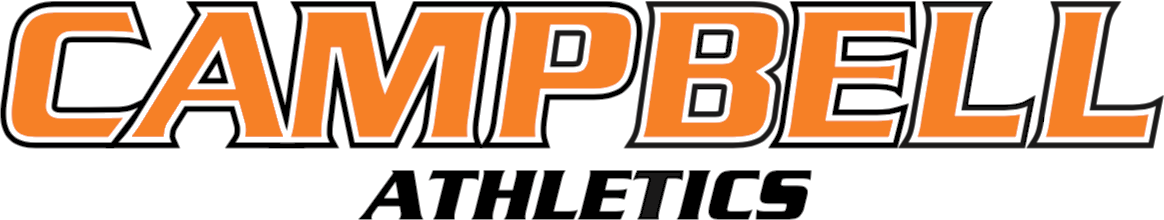
- Conference: Pioneer Football League
- Record: 6–5 (5–3 PFL)
- Head coach: Mike Minter (5th season)
- Offensive coordinator: David Marsh (1st season)
- Defensive coordinator: Craig Cox (5th season)
- Home stadium: Barker–Lane Stadium

2017 Pioneer Football League standings
	Conf.			Overall
Team	W		L	W		L
No. 23 San Diego $^	8	–	0	10	–	3
Drake	6	–	2	7	–	4
Jacksonville	5	–	3	7	–	4
Campbell	5	–	3	6	–	5
Valparaiso	5	–	3	6	–	5
Butler	4	–	4	6	–	5
Dayton	4	–	4	5	–	6
Marist	3	–	5	4	–	7
Morehead State	3	–	5	4	–	7
Stetson	1	–	7	2	–	9
Davidson	0	–	8	2	–	9
$ – Conference champion; ^ – FCS playoff participant; Rankings from STATS Poll

The 2017 Campbell Fighting Camels football team represented Campbell University in the 2017 NCAA Division I FCS football season. They were led by fifth-year head coach Mike Minter and played their home games at Barker–Lane Stadium. They were members of the Pioneer Football League until the end of the 2017 season before transitioning to the Big South Conference for the 2018 season. They finished the season 6–5, 5–3 in PFL play to finish in a three-way tie for third place.

== Schedule ==
Date	Time	Opponent	Site	TV	Result	Attendance
August 31	7:00 p.m.	Methodist*	Barker–Lane Stadium; Buies Creek, NC	BSN	W 70–0	4,831
September 9	6:00 p.m.	Georgetown*	Barker–Lane Stadium; Buies Creek, NC	BSN	L 10–16	5,853
September 16	7:00 p.m.	at Presbyterian*	Bailey Memorial Stadium; Clinton, SC	BSN	L 16–28	2,204
September 23	4:00 p.m.	at Stetson	Spec Martin Stadium; DeLand, FL	ESPN3	W 49–21	2,316
September 30	2:00 p.m.	Morehead State	Barker–Lane Stadium; Buies Creek, NC	BSN	W 38–0	6,387
October 7	2:00 p.m.	Valparaiso	Barker–Lake Stadium; Buies Creek, NC	BSN	W 49–10	5,253
October 14	1:00 p.m.	at Dayton	Welcome Stadium; Dayton, OH		W 17–7	2,592
October 21	1:00 p.m.	at Butler	Butler Bowl; Indianapolis, IN		L 23–37	4,139
October 28	2:00 p.m.	Jacksonville^{†}	Barker–Lane Stadium; Buies Creek, NC	BSN	L 48–54 ^{3OT}	6,601
November 4	1:00 p.m.	at Davidson	Richardson Stadium; Davidson, NC		W 42–29	3,257
November 11	1:00 p.m.	Drake	Barker–Lane Stadium; Buies Creek, NC	BSN	L 10–45	4,261
*Non-conference game; ^{†}Homecoming; All times are in Eastern time

== Game summaries ==
=== Methodist ===
	1	2	3	4	Total
Monarchs	0	0	0	0	0
Fighting Camels	35	14	14	7	70

=== Georgetown ===
	1	2	3	4	Total
Hoyas	3	0	7	6	16
Fighting Camels	0	0	7	3	10

=== At Presbyterian ===
	1	2	3	4	Total
Fighting Camels	3	0	0	13	16
Blue Hose	0	21	0	7	28

=== At Stetson ===
	1	2	3	4	Total
Fighting Camels	28	14	0	7	49
Hatters	0	7	7	7	21

=== Morehead State ===
	1	2	3	4	Total
Eagles	0	0	0	0	0
Fighting Camels	0	17	14	7	38

=== Valparaiso ===
	1	2	3	4	Total
Crusaders	7	0	3	0	10
Fighting Camels	28	21	0	0	49

=== At Dayton ===
	1	2	3	4	Total
Fighting Camels	0	0	7	10	17
Flyers	0	0	7	0	7

=== At Butler ===
	1	2	3	4	Total
Fighting Camels	0	7	10	6	23
Bulldogs	3	17	7	10	37

=== Jacksonville ===
	1	2	3	4	OT	2OT	3OT	Total
Dolphins	0	10	14	10	7	7	6	54
Fighting Camels	10	7	14	3	7	7	0	48

=== At Davidson ===
	1	2	3	4	Total
Fighting Camels	7	14	14	7	42
Wildcats	12	3	14	0	29

=== Drake ===
	1	2	3	4	Total
Bulldogs	7	7	21	10	45
Fighting Camels	0	3	7	0	10
