= 2017 Southern Illinois Salukis football team =

American college football season

2017 Southern Illinois Salukis football
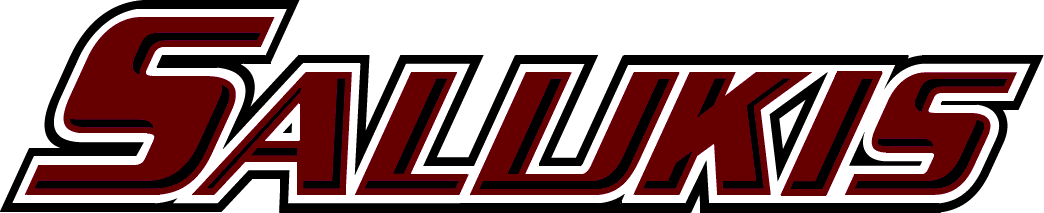
- Conference: Missouri Valley Football Conference
- Record: 4–7 (2–6 MVFC)
- Head coach: Nick Hill (2nd season)
- Offensive coordinator: John Van Dam (2nd season)
- Defensive coordinator: Kraig Paulson (2nd season)
- Home stadium: Saluki Stadium

2017 Missouri Valley Football Conference standings
	Conf.			Overall
Team	W		L	W		L
No. 1 North Dakota State $^	7	–	1	14	–	1
No. 3 South Dakota State ^	6	–	2	11	–	3
No. 19 Northern Iowa ^	6	–	2	8	–	5
No. 13 Western Illinois ^	5	–	3	8	–	4
No. 15 South Dakota ^	4	–	4	8	–	5
Illinois State	4	–	4	6	–	5
Youngstown State	4	–	4	6	–	5
Southern Illinois	2	–	6	4	–	7
Missouri State	2	–	6	3	–	8
Indiana State	0	–	8	0	–	11
$ – Conference champion; ^ – FCS playoff participant; Rankings from STATS Poll

The 2017 Southern Illinois Salukis football team represented Southern Illinois University Carbondale as a member of the Missouri Valley Football Conference (MVFC) during the 2017 NCAA Division I FCS football season. Led by second-year head coach Nick Hill, the Salukis compiled an overall record of 4–7 with a mark of 2–6 in conference play, tying for eighth place in the MVFC. Southern Illinois played home games at Saluki Stadium in Carbondale, Illinois.

== Schedule ==
Date	Time	Opponent	Site	TV	Result	Attendance
September 9	6:00 p.m.	Mississippi Valley State*	Saluki Stadium; Carbondale, IL	ESPN3	W 55–3	8,194
September 16	6:00 p.m.	at Southeast Missouri State*	Houck Stadium; Cape Girardeau, MO	OVCDN	W 35–17	7,025
September 23	7:00 p.m.	at Memphis*	Liberty Bowl Memorial Stadium; Memphis, TN	ESPN3	L 31–44	41,584
September 30	6:00 p.m.	Northern Iowa	Saluki Stadium; Carbondale, IL	ESPN3	L 17–24	9,112
October 7	6:00 p.m.	at No. 8 South Dakota State	Dana J. Dykhouse Stadium; Brookings, SD	ESPN3	L 14–49	12,891
October 14	2:00 p.m.	No. 17 Illinois State^{†}	Saluki Stadium; Carbondale, IL	ESPN3	W 42–7	8,121
October 21	2:00 p.m.	at Indiana State	Memorial Stadium; Terre Haute, IN	ESPN3	W 45–24	6,811
October 28	3:00 p.m.	at No. 6 South Dakota	DakotaDome; Vermillion, SD	ESPN3	L 0–42	8,498
November 4	1:00 p.m.	Missouri State	Saluki Stadium; Carbondale, IL	ESPN3	L 28–36	5,235
November 11	1:00 p.m.	Youngstown State	Saluki Stadium; Carbondale, IL	ESPN3	L 20–28	3,147
November 18	1:00 p.m.	at No. 9 Western Illinois	Hanson Field; Macomb, IL	ESPN3	L 14–28	2,812
*Non-conference game; ^{†}Homecoming; Rankings from STATS Poll released prior to the game; All times are in Central time

== Game summaries ==
=== Mississippi Valley State ===
	1	2	3	4	Total
Delta Devils	3	0	0	0	3
Salukis	21	20	14	0	55

=== At Southeast Missouri State ===
	1	2	3	4	Total
Salukis	7	21	7	0	35
Redhawks	3	7	0	7	17

=== At Memphis ===
	1	2	3	4	Total
Salukis	14	7	3	7	31
Tigers	7	10	17	10	44

=== Northern Iowa ===
	1	2	3	4	Total
Panthers	3	14	7	0	24
Salukis	0	3	7	7	17

=== At South Dakota State ===
	1	2	3	4	Total
Salukis	0	0	7	7	14
No. 8 Jackrabbits	14	21	0	14	49

=== Illinois State ===
	1	2	3	4	Total
No. 17 Redbirds	0	0	7	0	7
Salukis	7	14	7	14	42

=== At Indiana State ===
	1	2	3	4	Total
Salukis	17	7	7	14	45
Sycamores	14	0	3	7	24

=== At South Dakota ===
	1	2	3	4	Total
Salukis	0	0	0	0	0
No. 6 Coyotes	14	7	7	14	42

=== Missouri State ===
	1	2	3	4	Total
Bears	24	3	0	9	36
Salukis	7	7	7	7	28

=== Youngstown State ===
	1	2	3	4	Total
Penguins	0	14	7	7	28
Salukis	0	7	10	3	20

=== At Western Illinois ===
	1	2	3	4	Total
Salukis	0	0	0	14	14
No. 9 Leathernecks	0	14	7	7	28
