= 2017 Valparaiso Crusaders football team =

American college football season

2017 Valparaiso Crusaders football
- Conference: Pioneer Football League
- Record: 6–5 (5–3 PFL)
- Head coach: Dave Cecchini (4th season)
- Offensive coordinator: Jason Miran (4th season)
- Defensive coordinator: Ernest Moore (4th season)
- Home stadium: Brown Field

2017 Pioneer Football League standings
	Conf.			Overall
Team	W		L	W		L
No. 23 San Diego $^	8	–	0	10	–	3
Drake	6	–	2	7	–	4
Jacksonville	5	–	3	7	–	4
Campbell	5	–	3	6	–	5
Valparaiso	5	–	3	6	–	5
Butler	4	–	4	6	–	5
Dayton	4	–	4	5	–	6
Marist	3	–	5	4	–	7
Morehead State	3	–	5	4	–	7
Stetson	1	–	7	2	–	9
Davidson	0	–	8	2	–	9
$ – Conference champion; ^ – FCS playoff participant; Rankings from STATS Poll

The 2017 Valparaiso Crusaders football team represented Valparaiso University in the 2017 NCAA Division I FCS football season. They were led by fourth-year head coach Dave Cecchini and played their home games at Brown Field. They competed in the Pioneer Football League. They finished the season 6–5, 5–3 in PFL play to finish in a three-way tie for third place. The Crusaders had a winning season for the first time since 2003 and had five league wins for the first time since 1961.

== Schedule ==
Date	Time	Opponent	Site	TV	Result	Attendance
September 2	2:00 p.m.	at Montana*	Washington–Grizzly Stadium; Missoula, MT	ALT/SWX	L 23–45	23,160
September 9	1:04 p.m.	Duquesne*	Brown Field; Valparaiso, IN	WVUR	L 40–45	2,932
September 16	1:00 p.m.	at Trinity International*	Leslie Frazier Field; Deerfield, IL	TIU	W 44–10	300
September 23	1:00 p.m.	at Drake	Drake Stadium; Des Moines, IA	BV	L 13–38	2,956
September 30	1:00 p.m.	Stetson^{†}	Brown Field; Valparaiso, IN	WVUR	W 27–24	4,492
October 7	1:00 p.m.	at Campbell	Barker–Lane Stadium; Buies Creek, NC	BSN	L 10–49	5,253
October 14	1:00 p.m.	Marist	Brown Field; Valparaiso, IN	WVUR	W 49–15	946
October 28	1:04 p.m.	Morehead State	Brown Field; Valparaiso, IN	ESPN3	W 63–32	2,277
November 4	11:05 a.m.	at Jacksonville	D. B. Milne Field; Jacksonville, FL	ESPN3	L 20–17	1,738
November 11	12:00 p.m.	at Butler	Bud and Jackie Sellick Bowl; Indianapolis, IN (Hoosier Helmet Trophy)	Facebook Live	W 36–28	3,661
November 18	1:04 p.m.	Dayton	Brown Field; Valparaiso, IN	WVUR	W 8–7	1,238
*Non-conference game; ^{†}Homecoming; All times are in Eastern time

- Source: Schedule

== Game summaries ==
=== At Montana ===
	1	2	3	4	Total
Crusaders	6	7	0	10	23
Grizzlies	10	7	7	21	45

=== Duquesne ===
	1	2	3	4	Total
Dukes	14	17	7	7	45
Crusaders	0	21	7	12	40

=== At Trinity International ===
	1	2	3	4	Total
Crusaders	14	10	13	7	44
Trojans	7	3	0	0	10

=== At Drake ===
	1	2	3	4	Total
Crusaders	6	7	0	0	13
Bulldogs	14	3	14	7	38

=== Stetson ===
	1	2	3	4	Total
Hatters	0	13	3	8	24
Crusaders	10	10	0	7	27

=== At Campbell ===
	1	2	3	4	Total
Crusaders	7	0	3	0	10
Fighting Camels	28	21	0	0	49

=== Marist ===
	1	2	3	4	Total
Red Foxes	3	0	6	6	15
Crusaders	7	7	21	14	49

=== Morehead State ===
	1	2	3	4	Total
Eagles	0	6	12	14	32
Crusaders	21	21	14	7	63

=== At Jacksonville ===
	1	2	3	4	Total
Crusaders	7	7	0	3	17
Dolphins	3	10	7	0	20

=== At Butler ===
	1	2	3	4	Total
Crusaders	17	7	6	6	36
Bulldogs	3	14	0	11	28

=== Dayton ===
	1	2	3	4	Total
Flyers	0	0	0	7	7
Crusaders	0	0	0	8	8
