= Ian Shields =

American football coach and player (born c. 1971)

Current position
- Title: Head coach
- Team: Minot State
- Conference: NSIC
- Record: 12–31

Biographical details
- Born: c. 1971 (age 54–55)

Playing career
- 1990–1993: Oregon State
- Position: Quarterback

Coaching career (HC unless noted)
- 1994–1996: Oregon State (GA)
- 1997–1999: Eastern Oregon (OC)
- 2000–2002: Saint Mary's (OC)
- 2003: Bucknell (OC)
- 2004–2005: Cal Poly (OC)
- 2006–2007: Eastern Oregon
- 2008: Cal Poly (OC)
- 2009–2013: Army (OC/AHC)
- 2014–2015: Lenoir–Rhyne
- 2016–2019: Jacksonville
- 2020–2022: UNLV (OA)
- 2023–present: Minot State

Head coaching record
- Overall: 52–78
- Tournaments: 0–1 (NCAA D-II playoffs)

Accomplishments and honors

Championships
- 1 SAC (2014)

Ian Shields (born c. 1971) is an American college football coach and former player. He is the head football coach for Minot State University, a position he has held since 2023. Shields served as the head football coach at Eastern Oregon University in La Grande, Oregon from 2006 to 2007, Lenoir–Rhyne University in Hickory, North Carolina from 2014 to 2015, and at Jacksonville University in Jacksonville, Florida from 2016 to 2019. He played college football as a quarterback at Oregon State University.

== Head coaching record ==
Year	Team	Overall	Conference	Standing	Bowl/playoffs	AFCA^{#}
Eastern Oregon Mountaineers (Frontier Conference) (2006–2007)
2006	Eastern Oregon	6–5	5–5	4th		
2007	Eastern Oregon	1–10	1–9	6th		
Eastern Oregon:		7–15	6–14			
Lenoir–Rhyne Bears (South Atlantic Conference) (2014–2015)
2014	Lenoir–Rhyne	11–1	7–0	1st	L NCAA Division II Second Round	8
2015	Lenoir–Rhyne	5–5	3–4	T–5th		
Lenoir–Rhyne:		16–6	10–4			
Jacksonville Dolphins (Pioneer Football League) (2016–2019)
2016	Jacksonville	5–5	4–3	4th		
2017	Jacksonville	7–4	5–3	T–3rd		
2018	Jacksonville	2–8	1–7	10th		
2019	Jacksonville	3–9	1–7	T–9th		
Jacksonville:		17–26	11–20			
Minot State (Northern Sun Intercollegiate Conference) (2023–present)
2023	Minot State	1–10	1–9	T–10th		
2024	Minot State	5–6	4–6	10th		
2025	Minot State	3–8	3–7 / 3–3	T–10th / T–4th (North)		
2026	Minot State	3–7	3–6 / 2–3			
Minot State:		12–31	11–28			
Total:		52–78				
National championship Conference title Conference division title or championship game berth
