= Courtney Messingham =

American football player and coach (born 1966)

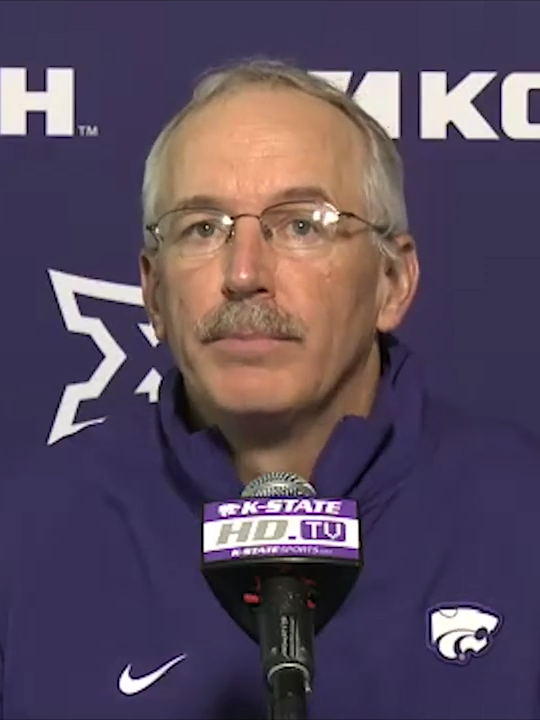
- Messingham in 2020

Biographical details
- Born: October 23, 1966 (age 60)

Playing career
- 1986–1989: Northern Iowa
- Positions: Quarterback, defensive back

Coaching career (HC unless noted)
- 1990: St. Ambrose (GA)
- 1991–1992: St. Ambrose (OC/QB)
- 1993–1994: Iowa Lakes (OC/QB)
- 1995–1996: Truman State (RB/TE)
- 1997–1998: Truman State (OC)
- 1999: Missouri State (WR/TE)
- 2000–2002: Missouri State (OC/QB)
- 2003–2004: Upper Iowa
- 2005–2006: Southern Miss (WR)
- 2007: Southern Miss (RB)
- 2008: Missouri State (ST/WR)
- 2009–2010: Iowa State (TE)
- 2011: Iowa State (WR)
- 2012–2013: Iowa State (OC/QB)
- 2014–2015: Indiana (QC)
- 2016: Montana State (OC/QB)
- 2017–2018: North Dakota State (OC/RB)
- 2019–2021: Kansas State (OC/TE)
- 2022: Illinois (OA)

Head coaching record
- Overall: 3–17

Courtney Messingham (born October 23, 1966) is an American football coach and former player. Messingham served as the head football coach at Upper Iowa University from 2003 to 2004, compiling a record of 3–17. He played college football at the University of Northern Iowa.

== Head coaching record ==
Year	Team	Overall	Conference	Standing	Bowl/playoffs
Upper Iowa Peacocks (NCAA Division II independent) (2003–2004)
2003	Upper Iowa	1–9			
2004	Upper Iowa	2–8			
Upper Iowa:		3–17			
Total:		3–17			
