= 2017 San Diego Toreros football team =

American college football season

2017 San Diego Toreros football

PFL champion

NCAA Division I Second Round, L 3–38 vs. North Dakota State
- Conference: Pioneer Football League

Ranking
- STATS: No. 23
- FCS Coaches: No. 25
- Record: 10–3 (8–0 PFL)
- Head coach: Dale Lindsey (5th season)
- Offensive coordinator: Tanner Engstrand (7th season)
- Defensive coordinator: Steve Irvin (5th season)
- Home stadium: Torero Stadium

2017 Pioneer Football League standings
	Conf.			Overall
Team	W		L	W		L
No. 23 San Diego $^	8	–	0	10	–	3
Drake	6	–	2	7	–	4
Jacksonville	5	–	3	7	–	4
Campbell	5	–	3	6	–	5
Valparaiso	5	–	3	6	–	5
Butler	4	–	4	6	–	5
Dayton	4	–	4	5	–	6
Marist	3	–	5	4	–	7
Morehead State	3	–	5	4	–	7
Stetson	1	–	7	2	–	9
Davidson	0	–	8	2	–	9
$ – Conference champion; ^ – FCS playoff participant; Rankings from STATS Poll

The 2017 San Diego Toreros football team represented the University of San Diego as a member of the Pioneer Football League (PFL) during the 2017 NCAA Division I FCS football season. Led by fifth-year head coach Dale Lindsey, the Toreros compiled an overall record of 10–3 with a mark of 8–0 in conference play, winning the PFL title. San Diego earned the conference's automatic bid to the NCAA Division I Football Championship playoffs, where the Toreros defeated Northern Arizona in the first round before losing in the second round to North Dakota State for the second consecutive year. The team played home games at Torero Stadium in San Diego.

== Preseason ==
In a poll of league coaches, San Diego was picked to win the Pioneer League for the seventh consecutive year.

== Schedule ==
Date	Time	Opponent	Site	TV	Result	Attendance
September 2	2:00 p.m.	Western New Mexico*	Torero Stadium; San Diego, CA	TheW.tv via Stadium	W 34–20	2,247
September 9	6:00 p.m.	at UC Davis*	Aggie Stadium; Davis, CA	Pluto TV	L 7–35	6,588
September 16	9:00 a.m.	at Princeton*	Powers Field at Princeton Stadium; Princeton, NJ	ELVN	L 17–27	10,421
September 23	2:00 p.m.	Butler	Torero Stadium; San Diego, CA	TheW.tv via STADIUM	W 38–17	1,701
September 30	9:00 a.m.	at Dayton	Welcome Stadium; Dayton, OH		W 23–7	3,032
October 14	2:00 p.m.	Morehead State^{†}	Torero Stadium; San Diego, CA	TheW.tv via STADIUM	W 56–27	3,062
October 21	9:00 a.m.	at Jacksonville	D. B. Milne Field; Jacksonville, FL	ESPN3	W 63–10	1,748
October 28	10:00 a.m.	at Stetson	Spec Martin Stadium; DeLand, FL	ESPN3	W 48–7	1,520
November 4	2:00 p.m.	Drake	Torero Stadium; San Diego, CA	TheW.tv via STADIUM	W 45–15	1,582
November 11	9:30 a.m.	at Davidson	Richardson Stadium; Davidson, NC		W 63–7	2,705
November 18	2:00 p.m.	Marist	Torero Stadium; San Diego, CA	TheW.tv via STADIUM	W 35–7	2,119
November 25	5:00 p.m.	at No. 25 Northern Arizona*	Walkup Skydome; Flagstaff, AZ (NCAA Division I First Round)	ESPN3	W 41–10	4,068
December 2	5:00 p.m.	at No. 4 North Dakota State*	Fargodome; Fargo, ND (NCAA Division I Second Round)	ESPN3	L 3–38	18,067
*Non-conference game; ^{†}Homecoming; Rankings from STATS Poll released prior to the game; All times are in Pacific time

== Game summaries ==
=== Western New Mexico ===
	1	2	3	4	Total
Mustangs	13	0	0	7	20
Toreros	10	7	10	7	34

=== At UC Davis ===
	1	2	3	4	Total
Toreros	7	0	0	0	7
Aggies	7	7	7	14	35

=== At Princeton ===
	1	2	3	4	Total
Toreros	0	10	0	7	17
Tigers	6	8	6	7	27

=== Butler ===
	1	2	3	4	Total
Bulldogs	7	7	3	0	17
Toreros	10	21	0	7	38

=== At Dayton ===
	1	2	3	4	Total
Toreros	14	7	2	0	23
Flyers	0	7	0	0	7

=== Morehead State ===
	1	2	3	4	Total
Eagles	0	7	6	14	27
Toreros	28	21	7	0	56

=== At Jacksonville ===
	1	2	3	4	Total
Toreros	14	21	14	14	63
Dolphins	0	0	3	7	10

=== At Stetson ===
	1	2	3	4	Total
Toreros	7	17	21	3	48
Hatters	7	0	0	0	7

=== Drake ===
	1	2	3	4	Total
Bulldogs	7	0	0	8	15
Toreros	7	10	7	21	45

=== At Davidson ===
	1	2	3	4	Total
Toreros	14	21	14	14	63
Wildcats	0	0	7	0	7

=== Marist ===
	1	2	3	4	Total
Red Foxes	7	0	0	0	7
Toreros	14	7	7	7	35

=== At Northern Arizona—NCAA Division I First Round ===
	1	2	3	4	Total
Toreros	10	14	10	7	41
No. 25 Lumberjacks	0	10	0	0	10

=== At North Dakota State—NCAA Division I Second Round ===
	1	2	3	4	Total
Toreros	0	0	0	3	3
No. 4 Bison	14	3	21	0	38
