= 2017 South Dakota State Jackrabbits football team =

American college football season

2017 South Dakota State Jackrabbits football

NCAA Division I Semifinal, L 16–51 at James Madison
- Conference: Missouri Valley Football Conference

Ranking
- STATS: No. 3
- FCS Coaches: No. 4
- Record: 11–3 (6–2 MVFC)
- Head coach: John Stiegelmeier (21st season)
- Offensive coordinator: Eric Eidsness (12th season)
- Defensive coordinator: Clint Brown (9th season)
- Home stadium: Dana J. Dykhouse Stadium

2017 Missouri Valley Football Conference standings
	Conf.			Overall
Team	W		L	W		L
No. 1 North Dakota State $^	7	–	1	14	–	1
No. 3 South Dakota State ^	6	–	2	11	–	3
No. 19 Northern Iowa ^	6	–	2	8	–	5
No. 13 Western Illinois ^	5	–	3	8	–	4
No. 15 South Dakota ^	4	–	4	8	–	5
Illinois State	4	–	4	6	–	5
Youngstown State	4	–	4	6	–	5
Southern Illinois	2	–	6	4	–	7
Missouri State	2	–	6	3	–	8
Indiana State	0	–	8	0	–	11
$ – Conference champion; ^ – FCS playoff participant; Rankings from STATS Poll

The 2017 South Dakota State Jackrabbits football team represented South Dakota State University as a member of the Missouri Valley Football Conference (MVFC) during the 2017 NCAA Division I FCS football season. Led by 21st-year head coach John Stiegelmeier, the Jackrabbits compiled an overall record of 11–3 with a mark of 6–2 in conference play, tying for second place in the MVFC. South Dakota State received an at-large bid to the NCAA Division I Football Championship playoffs, where, after a first-round bye, the Jackrabbits defeated Northern Iowa in the second round and New Hampshire in the quarterfinals before losing to James Madison in the semifinals. The team played home games on campus at Dana J. Dykhouse Stadium in Brookings, South Dakota.

== Schedule ==
Date	Time	Opponent	Rank	Site	TV	Result	Attendance	Source
August 31	7:00 p.m.	Duquesne*	No. 4	Dana J. Dykhouse Stadium; Brookings, SD	ESPN3	W 51–13	12,218	
September 9	7:00 p.m.	at Montana State*	No. 4	Bobcat Stadium; Bozeman, MT	Pluto TV	W 31–27	19,817	
September 16	6:00 p.m.	Drake*	No. 4	Dana J. Dykhouse Stadium; Brookings, SD	ESPN3	W 51–10	15,806	
September 30	7:00 p.m.	at No. 6 Youngstown State	No. 4	Stambaugh Stadium; Youngstown, OH	ESPN3	L 7–19	17,450	
October 7	6:00 p.m.	Southern Illinois	No. 8	Dana J. Dykhouse Stadium; Brookings, SD	ESPN3	W 49–14	12,891	
October 14	2:00 p.m.	Northern Iowa^{†}	No. 7	Dana J. Dykhouse Stadium; Brookings, SD	ESPN3	L 18–38	14,347	
October 21	2:00 p.m.	at Missouri State	No. 13	Robert W. Plaster Stadium; Springfield, MO	ESPN3	W 62–30	6,253	
October 28	1:00 p.m.	at No. 12 Western Illinois	No. 11	Hanson Field; Macomb, IL	ESPN3	W 52–24	2,247	
November 4	2:00 p.m.	No. 2 North Dakota State	No. 10	Dana J. Dykhouse Stadium; Brookings, SD (Dakota Marker)	ESPN3	W 33–21	18,130	
November 11	2:00 p.m.	No. 17 Illinois State	No. 6	Dana J. Dykhouse Stadium; Brookings, SD	ESPN3	W 27–24 ^{OT}	9,458	
November 18	2:00 p.m.	at No. 15 South Dakota	No. 6	DakotaDome; Vermillion, SD (rivalry)	ESPN3	W 31–28	10,147	
December 2	2:00 p.m.	No. 20 Northern Iowa*	No. 6	Dana J. Dykhouse Stadium; Brookings, SD (NCAA Division Second Round)	ESPN3	W 37–22	7,815	
December 9	2:00 p.m.	No. 21 New Hampshire*	No. 6	Dana J. Dykhouse Stadium; Brookings, SD (NCAA Division I Quarterfinal)	ESPN3	W 56–14	5,583	
December 16	6:00 p.m.	at No. 1 James Madison*	No. 6	Bridgeforth Stadium; Harrisonburg, VA (NCAA Division I Semifinal)	ESPNU	L 16–51	16,528	
*Non-conference game; ^{†}Homecoming; Rankings from STATS Poll released prior to the game; All times are in Central time

== Rankings ==
Ranking movements Legend: ██ Increase in ranking ██ Decrease in ranking т = Tied with team above or below ( ) = First-place votes
	Week													
Poll	Pre	1	2	3	4	5	6	7	8	9	10	11	12	Final
STATS FCS	4 (2)	4 (1)	4 (1)	4 (1)	4 (1)	8	7	13	11	10	6	6	6	3
Coaches	6 (1)	4	4	4	4	9	7	13	8–T	8	5	5	6	4

== Jackrabbits drafted ==
Draft Year	Player	Position	Round	Overall	NFL team
2018	Dallas Goedert	TE	2	49	Philadelphia Eagles
