= Josh Hayes (American football) =

American football player (born 1999)

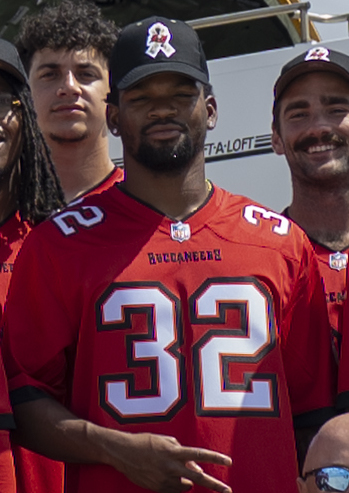
- Hayes with the Tampa Bay Buccaneers in 2023

No. 32 – Tampa Bay Buccaneers
- Position: Cornerback
- Roster status: Injured reserve

Personal information
- Born: April 24, 1999 (age 27); Miami, Florida, U.S.
- Listed height: 6 ft 0 in (1.83 m)
- Listed weight: 190 lb (86 kg)

Career information
- High school: Lake Gibson (Lakeland)
- College: North Dakota State (2017–2020); Virginia (2021); Kansas State (2022)
- NFL draft: 2023: 6th round, 181st overall pick

Career history
- Tampa Bay Buccaneers (2023–present)

Awards and highlights
- 3× FCS national champion (2017, 2018, 2019); Second-team All-MVFC (2019)

Career NFL statistics as of 2025
- Total tackles: 67
- Forced fumbles: 1
- Fumble recoveries: 1
- Pass deflections: 3
- Stats at Pro Football Reference

Josh Hayes (born April 24, 1999) is an American professional football cornerback for the Tampa Bay Buccaneers of the National Football League (NFL). He played college football for the North Dakota State Bison, Virginia Cavaliers, and Kansas State Wildcats.

== Professional career ==
Pre-draft measurables
Height	Weight	Arm length	Hand span	Wingspan	40-yard dash	10-yard split	20-yard split	20-yard shuttle	Three-cone drill	Vertical jump	Broad jump	Bench press
5 ft 11 1/8 in (1.81 m)	197 lb (89 kg)	31 in (0.79 m)	8 3/4 in (0.22 m)	6 ft 4 1/8 in (1.93 m)	4.47 s	1.57 s	2.62 s	4.53 s	7.07 s	32.0 in (0.81 m)	9 ft 10 in (3.00 m)	16 reps
All values from Kansas State's Pro Day

Hayes was selected in the sixth round by the Tampa Bay Buccaneers with the 181st overall pick in the 2023 NFL draft.

On August 30, 2026, Hayes was placed on injured reserve after undergoing knee surgery.

== Personal life ==
Hayes' uncle was linebacker Geno Hayes.
