= 2017 Southern Conference football season =

- League: NCAA Division I Football Championship
- Sport: Football
- Duration: August 26, 2017 – November 18, 2017
- Teams: 9
- TV partner(s): SoCon Digital Network; American Sports Network; ESPN3

Southern Conference football seasons
- ← 2016 2018

2017 Southern Conference football standings
	Conf.			Overall
Team	W		L	W		L
No. 6 Wofford $^	7	–	1	10	–	3
No. 18 Samford ^	6	–	2	8	–	4
No. 19 Furman ^	6	–	2	8	–	5
Western Carolina	5	–	3	7	–	5
Mercer	4	–	4	5	–	6
The Citadel	3	–	5	5	–	6
Chattanooga	3	–	5	3	–	8
East Tennessee State	2	–	6	4	–	7
VMI	0	–	8	0	–	11
$ – Conference champion; ^ – FCS playoff participant; Rankings from STATS Poll

The 2017 Southern Conference football season was the 96th season of college football for the Southern Conference (SoCon) and formed a part of the 2017 NCAA Division I FCS football season.

== Head coaches ==
- Tom Arth, Chattanooga – 1st year
- Brent Thompson, The Citadel – 2nd year
- Carl Torbush, East Tennessee State – 3rd year
- Clay Hendrix, Furman – 1st year
- Bobby Lamb, Mercer – 5th year
- Chris Hatcher, Samford – 3rd year
- Scott Wachenheim, VMI – 3rd year
- Mark Speir, Western Carolina – 6th year
- Mike Ayers, Wofford – 30th year

== Preseason poll results ==
First place votes in parentheses

Media			Coaches		
Place	School	Points	Place	School	Points
1	Wofford (11)	178	1	Wofford (7)	63
2	The Citadel (6)	166	2	The Citadel (2)	54
3	Samford (3)	156	3	Samford	52
4	Chattanooga (2)	152	4	Chattanooga	41
5	Mercer	101	5	Mercer	32
6	Furman	87	6	Western Carolina	27
7	Western Carolina	71	7	Furman	26
8	ETSU	49	8	ETSU	17
9	VMI	30	9	VMI	12

=== Preseason All-Conference Teams ===
Offensive Player of the Year: Devlin Hodges, R-Jr., QB, Samford
Defensive Player of the Year: Kailik Williams, Sr., DB, The Citadel

Position	Player	Class	Team
First Team Offense
QB	Devlin Hodges	R–Jr.	Samford
RB	Cam Jackson	Sr.	The Citadel
RB	Detrez Newsome	Sr.	Western Carolina
WR	Kelvin McKnight	Jr.	Samford
WR	Terryon Robinson	R-Sr.	Western Carolina
TE	Sam Walker	R-Jr.	Mercer
OL	Tyler Davis	Jr.	The Citadel
OL	Matthew Schmidt	Sr.	Furman
OL	Thomas Marchman	Sr.	Mercer
OL	Josh Cardiello	Sr.	Chattanooga
OL	Roo Daniels	Sr.	Wofford
First Team Defense
DL	Ahmad Gooden	R-Jr.	Samford
DL	Isaiah Mack	Jr.	Chattanooga
DL	Miles Brown	Jr.	Wofford
DL	Tyler Vaughn	Sr.	Wofford
LB	Shaheed Salmon	Sr.	Samford
LB	Dale Warren	Sr.	Chattanooga
LB	Allan Cratsenberg	Sr.	VMI
LB	Datavious Wilson	So.	Wofford
DB	Kailik Williams	Sr.	The Citadel
DB	Omari Williams	Sr.	Samford
DB	Lucas Webb	Sr.	Chattanooga
DB	Devin Watson	Jr.	Wofford
First Team Special Teams
PK	Cole Fisher	Jr.	Mercer
P	Ian Berryman	R-Jr.	Western Carolina
RS	Detrez Newsome	Sr.	Western Carolina

== Rankings ==
Legend
Increase in ranking
Decrease in ranking
Not ranked previous week

		Pre	Wk 1	Wk 2	Wk 3	Wk 4	Wk 5	Wk 6	Wk 7	Wk 8	Wk 9	Wk 10	Wk 11	Wk 12	Final
Chattanooga	Stats	12	13	15	RV	RV	RV	–	–	–	–	–	–	–	–
Chattanooga	C	13	14	15	RV	RV	–	–	–	–	–	–	–	–	–
Chattanooga	FCS	Not released												Not released	
The Citadel	Stats	16	14	13	10	8	17	23	RV	RV	RV	–	–	–	–
The Citadel	C	12	13	13	10	11	17	22	RV	RV	RV	–	–	–	–
The Citadel	FCS	Not released												Not released	
East Tennessee State	Stats	–	–	–	–	–	–	–	–	–	–	–	–	–	–
East Tennessee State	C	–	–	–	–	–	–	–	–	–	–	–	–	–	–
East Tennessee State	FCS	Not released									–	–	–	Not released	
Furman	Stats										23	21	20	22	19
Furman	C											RV	24	25	20
Furman	FCS	Not released									–	–	–	Not released	
Mercer	Stats	–	–	–	–	–	–	–	–	–	–	–	–	–	–
Mercer	C	–	–	–	–	–	–	–	–	–	–	–	–	–	–
Mercer	FCS	Not released									–	–	–	Not released	
Samford	Stats	19	17	17	18	25	20	19	16	9	16	16	17	14	18
Samford	C	19	17	17	17	23	20	18	18	8	15	14	13	14	17
Samford	FCS	Not released									–	–	–	Not released	
VMI	Stats	–	–	–	–	–	–	–	–	–	–	–	–	–	–
VMI	C	–	–	–	–	–	–	–	–	–	–	–	–	–	–
VMI	FCS	Not released									–	–	–	Not released	
Western Carolina	Stats	–	RV	RV	RV	RV	22	21	19	18	24	22	RV	RV	RV
Western Carolina	C	–	–	–	–	RV	RV	25	21	20	RV	25	RV	RV	RV
Western Carolina	FCS	Not released									–	–	–	Not released	
Wofford	Stats	11	10	11	9	7	5	5	5	8	8	8	7	8	6
Wofford	C	11	10	9	9	7	5	5	5	10	9	8	7	9	7
Wofford	FCS	Not released									–	–	–	Not released	

== Regular season ==
Index to colors and formatting
SoCon member won
SoCon member lost
SoCon teams in **bold**

All times Eastern time.

Rankings reflect that of the Sports Network poll for that week.

=== Week One ===
Date	Time	Visiting team	Home team	Site	Broadcast	Result	Attendance	Reference

Players of the week:

Offensive		Defensive		Special teams	
Player	Team	Player	Team	Player	Team
**Reference: Weekly Release**

=== Week Two ===
Date	Time	Visiting team	Home team	Site	Broadcast	Result	Attendance	Reference

Players of the week:

Offensive		Defensive		Special teams	
Player	Team	Player	Team	Player	Team
**Reference: Weekly Release**

=== Week Three ===
Date	Time	Visiting team	Home team	Site	Broadcast	Result	Attendance	Reference

Players of the week:

Offensive		Defensive		Special teams	
Player	Team	Player	Team	Player	Team
**Reference: Weekly Release**

=== Week Four ===
Date	Time	Visiting team	Home team	Site	Broadcast	Result	Attendance	Reference

Players of the week:

Offensive		Defensive		Special teams	
Player	Team	Player	Team	Player	Team
**Reference: Weekly Release**

=== Week Five ===
Date	Time	Visiting team	Home team	Site	Broadcast	Result	Attendance	Reference

Players of the week:

Offensive		Defensive		Special teams	
Player	Team	Player	Team	Player	Team
**Reference: Weekly Release**

=== Week Six ===
Date	Time	Visiting team	Home team	Site	Broadcast	Result	Attendance	Reference

Players of the week:

Offensive		Defensive		Special teams	
Player	Team	Player	Team	Player	Team
**Reference: Weekly Release**

=== Week Seven ===
Date	Time	Visiting team	Home team	Site	Broadcast	Result	Attendance	Reference

Players of the week:

Offensive		Defensive		Special teams	
Player	Team	Player	Team	Player	Team
**Reference: Weekly Release**

=== Week Eight ===
Date	Time	Visiting team	Home team	Site	Broadcast	Result	Attendance	Reference

Players of the week:

Offensive		Defensive		Special teams	
Player	Team	Player	Team	Player	Team
**Reference: Weekly Release**

=== Week Nine ===
Date	Time	Visiting team	Home team	Site	Broadcast	Result	Attendance	Reference

Players of the week:

Offensive		Defensive		Special teams	
Player	Team	Player	Team	Player	Team
**Reference: Weekly Release**

=== Week Ten ===
Date	Time	Visiting team	Home team	Site	Broadcast	Result	Attendance	Reference

Players of the week:

Offensive		Defensive		Special teams	
Player	Team	Player	Team	Player	Team
**Reference: Weekly Release**

=== Week Eleven ===
Date	Time	Visiting team	Home team	Site	Broadcast	Result	Attendance	Reference

Players of the week:

Offensive		Defensive		Special teams	
Player	Team	Player	Team	Player	Team
**Reference: Weekly Release**

=== Week Twelve ===
Date	Time	Visiting team	Home team	Site	Broadcast	Result	Attendance	Reference

Players of the week:

Offensive		Defensive		Special teams	
Player	Team	Player	Team	Player	Team
**Reference: Weekly Release**

=== Week Thirteen ===
Date	Time	Visiting team	Home team	Site	Broadcast	Result	Attendance	Reference

== Records against other conferences ==
=== FCS conferences ===
Conference	Record
Big South	5–1
CAA	1–2
MVFC	0–1
NEC	1–1
OVC	0–2
Patriot	1–0
Pioneer	2–0
Total	10–7

=== FBS conferences ===
Conference	Record
ACC	0–3
MWC	0–2
SEC	0–5
Total	0–10

== Attendance ==
Team	Stadium	Capacity	Game 1	Game 2	Game 3	Game 4	Game 5	Game 6	Total	Average	% of Capacity
Chattanooga	Finley Stadium	20,668	10,141	10,101	9,651	7,521	8,434		45,848	9,170	44.4%
The Citadel	Johnson Hagood Stadium	21,000	7,467	9,969	8,543	11,609	7,384		44,972	8,994	42.8%
East Tennessee State	William B. Greene Jr. Stadium	10,000	9,530	7,544	8,022	8,540	7,087	7,327	48,050	8,008	80.1%
Furman	Paladin Stadium	16,000	6,342	7,104	7,216	8,108	10,105		38,875	7,775	48.6%
Mercer	Moye Complex	10,200	9,727	11,727	10,207	9,864	10,200		51,725	10,345	101.4%
Samford	Seibert Stadium	6,700	4,908	4,509	9,233	3,523	5,178	4,673	32,024	5,337	79.7%
VMI	Alumni Memorial Field	10,000	4,654	5,311	3,310	4,119	4,229		21,623	4,325	43.2%
Western Carolina	E. J. Whitmire Stadium	13,742	11,763	12,018	8,300	9,973	10,681		52,735	10,547	76.8%
Wofford	Gibbs Stadium	13,000	7,237	7,211	6,982	7,236	5,012	5,153	38,831	6,472	49.8%

== NFL draft ==
The following list includes all SoCon players who were drafted in the 2018 NFL draft.

Round #	Pick #	NFL team	Player	Position	College
7	243	New England Patriots	Keion Crossen	CB	Western Carolina
