= List of Western Carolina Catamounts football seasons =

This is a list of seasons completed by the Western Carolina Catamounts football team. Representing Western Carolina University in Cullowhee, North Carolina, the Catamounts compete in the Southern Conference in the NCAA Division I FCS. The school began playing football in 1931, and plays their home games out of 13,742-seat Bob Waters Field at E. J. Whitmire Stadium. The Catamounts are currently led by head coach Kerwin Bell.

The Catamounts' first and currently only conference championship came in 1949, where they went 8–3 and participated in the now-defunct Smoky Mountain Bowl. The program made an appearance in the 1983 NCAA Division I-AA national championship game, winning three games before falling to Southern Illinois in the championship game. The 1983 campaign was the winningest season in program history with an 11–3–1 record.

== Seasons ==
National champions †	Conference champions *	Division champions ‡	Bowl game berth ^

Year	Coach	Conference	Conference finish	Record			Bowl/Postseason	Final ranking	
Year	Coach	Conference	Conference finish	Wins	Losses	Ties	Bowl/Postseason	TSN/STATS Poll	Coaches' Poll
Western Carolina Catamounts
1931	C.C. Poindexter	Ind	—	4	4	0	—	N/A	N/A
1932	C.C. Poindexter	Ind	—	2	9	0	—	N/A	N/A
1933	C.C. Poindexter	North State	—	1	6	2	—	N/A	N/A
1934	C.C. Poindexter	North State, Smoky Mountain	—	3	7	0	—	N/A	N/A
1935	Ralph James	North State, Smoky Mountain	—	1	10	0	—	N/A	N/A
1936	Ralph James	North State, Smoky Mountain	—	2	7	0	—	N/A	N/A
1937	Ralph James	North State, Smoky Mountain	—	1	6	2	—	N/A	N/A
1938	Ralph James	North State	—	0	7	1	—	N/A	N/A
1939	James Whatley	North State	—	1	6	1	—	N/A	N/A
1940	James Whatley	North State	—	2	4	0	—	N/A	N/A
1941	James Whatley	North State	—	3	5	0	—	N/A	N/A
1942	No team	Season cancelled due to World War II.							
1943	No team	Season cancelled due to World War II.							
1944	No team	Season cancelled due to World War II.							
1945	Marion McDonald	North State	—	1	3	0	—	N/A	N/A
1946	Tom Young	North State	—	6	3	1	—	N/A	N/A
1947	Tom Young	North State	—	3	5	1	—	N/A	N/A
1948	Tom Young	North State	—	7	3	0	—	N/A	N/A
1949	Tom Young	North State	1st	8	3	0	Lost 1949 Smoky Mountain Bowl vs West Liberty State, 0-20	N/A	N/A
1950	Tom Young	North State	—	3	6	0	—	N/A	N/A
1951	Tom Young	North State	—	3	6	0	—	N/A	N/A
1952	Tom Young	North State	—	2	8	0	—	N/A	N/A
1953	Tom Young	North State	—	1	9	0	—	N/A	N/A
1954	Tom Young	North State	—	4	5	1	—	N/A	N/A
1955	Tom Young	North State	—	2	7	1	—	N/A	N/A
1956	Dan Robinson	North State	—	1	9	0	—	N/A	N/A
1957	Dan Robinson	North State	—	2	5	1	—	N/A	N/A
1958	Dan Robinson	North State	—	1	8	1	—	N/A	N/A
1959	Dan Robinson	North State	—	7	2	1	—	N/A	N/A
1960	Dan Robinson	North State	—	6	5	0	—	N/A	N/A
1961	Dan Robinson	CIAC	—	4	6	0	—	N/A	N/A
1962	Dan Robinson	CIAC	—	3	5	1	—	N/A	N/A
1963	Dan Robinson	CIAC	—	2	6	1	—	N/A	N/A
1964	Dan Robinson	CIAC	—	5	4	0	—	N/A	N/A
1965	Dan Robinson	CIAC	—	7	2	0	—	N/A	N/A
1966	Dan Robinson	CIAC	—	5	5	0	—	N/A	N/A
1967	Dan Robinson	CIAC	—	4	5	1	—	N/A	N/A
1968	Dan Robinson	Ind	—	4	5	0	—	N/A	N/A
1969	Bob Waters	Ind	—	9	1	0	—	N/A	N/A
1970	Bob Waters	Ind	—	6	3	0	—	N/A	N/A
1971	Bob Waters	Ind	—	4	6	0	—	N/A	N/A
1972	Bob Waters	Ind	—	7	2	1	—	N/A	N/A
1973	Bob Waters	Ind	—	6	3	1	—	N/A	N/A
1974	Bob Waters	Ind	—	9	2	0	NCAA Division II Playoffs - First Round	N/A	N/A
1975	Bob Waters	Ind	—	3	7	0	—	N/A	N/A
1976	Bob Waters	Southern	—	6	4	0	—	N/A	N/A
1977	Bob Waters	Southern	5th	6	4	1	—	N/A	N/A
1978	Bob Waters	Southern	T-3rd	6	5	0	—	N/A	N/A
1979	Bob Waters	Southern	7th	6	5	0	—	N/A	N/A
1980	Bob Waters	Southern	5th	3	7	1	—	N/A	N/A
1981	Bob Waters	Southern	6th	4	7	0	—	N/A	N/A
1982	Bob Waters	Southern	3rd	6	5	0	—	N/A	N/A
1983	Bob Waters	Southern	2nd	11	3	1	NCAA Division I-AA Playoffs - Runner Up	9	N/A
1984	Bob Waters	Southern	2nd	8	3	0	—	14	N/A
1985	Bob Waters	Southern	T-5th	4	6	1	—	N/A	N/A
1986	Bob Waters	Southern	2nd	6	5	0	—	N/A	N/A
1987	Bob Waters	Southern	T-5th	4	7	0	—	N/A	N/A
1988	Bob Waters	Southern	T-7th	2	9	0	—	N/A	N/A
1989	Dale Strahm	Southern	T-6th	3	7	1	—	N/A	N/A
1990	Steve Hodgin	Southern	6th	3	8	0	—	N/A	N/A
1991	Steve Hodgin	Southern	T-6th	2	9	0	—	N/A	N/A
1992	Steve Hodgin	Southern	T-2nd	7	4	0	—	N/A	N/A
1993	Steve Hodgin	Southern	3rd	6	5	0	—	N/A	N/A
1994	Steve Hodgin	Southern	T-3rd	6	5	0	—	N/A	N/A
1995	Steve Hodgin	Southern	T-7th	3	7	0	—	N/A	N/A
1996	Steve Hodgin	Southern	9th	4	7	-	—	N/A	N/A
1997	Bill Bleil	Southern	7th	3	8	-	—	N/A	N/A
1998	Bill Bleil	Southern	3rd	6	5	-	—	N/A	N/A
1999	Bill Bleil	Southern	7th	3	8	-	—	N/A	N/A
2000	Bill Bleil	Southern	T-6th	4	7	-	—	N/A	N/A
2001	Bill Bleil	Southern	4th	7	4	-	—	N/A	N/A
2002	Kent Briggs	Southern	T-5th	5	6	-	—	N/A	N/A
2003	Kent Briggs	Southern	6th	5	7	-	—	N/A	N/A
2004	Kent Briggs	Southern	T-5th	4	7	-	—	N/A	N/A
2005	Kent Briggs	Southern	4th	5	4	-	—	N/A	N/A
2006	Kent Briggs	Southern	8th	2	9	-	—	N/A	N/A
2007	Kent Briggs	Southern	8th	1	10	-	—	N/A	N/A
2008	Dennis Wagner	Southern	8th	3	9	-	—	N/A	N/A
2009	Dennis Wagner	Southern	9th	2	9	-	—	N/A	N/A
2010	Dennis Wagner	Southern	9th	2	9	-	—	N/A	N/A
2011	Dennis Wagner	Southern	9th	1	10	-	—	N/A	N/A
2012	Mark Speir	Southern	9th	1	10	-	—	N/A	N/A
2013	Mark Speir	Southern	T-8th	2	10	-	—	N/A	N/A
2014	Mark Speir	Southern	T-2nd	7	5	-	—	N/A	N/A
2015	Mark Speir	Southern	3rd	7	4	-	—	N/A	N/A
2016	Mark Speir	Southern	T-8th	2	9	-	—	N/A	N/A
2017	Mark Speir	Southern	4th	7	5	-	—	N/A	N/A
2018	Mark Speir	Southern	8th	3	8	-	—	N/A	N/A
2019	Mark Speir	Southern	8th	3	9	-	—	N/A	N/A
2020	Mark Speir	Southern	9th	1	8	-	—	N/A	N/A
2021	Kerwin Bell	Southern	T-4th	4	7	-	—	N/A	N/A
2022	Kerwin Bell	Southern	5th	6	5	-	—	N/A	N/A
2023	Kerwin Bell	Southern	4th	7	4	-	—	23	RV
2024	Kerwin Bell	Southern	2nd	7	5	-	—	N/A	N/A
2025	Kerwin Bell	Southern	2nd	7	5	-	—	N/A	N/A
Total Totals through the 2019 season				347	522	23	(all games)		
