= 2017 The Citadel Bulldogs football team =

American college football season

2017 The Citadel Bulldogs football
- Conference: Southern Conference
- Record: 5–6 (3–5 SoCon)
- Head coach: Brent Thompson (2nd season)
- Offensive coordinator: Lou Conte (2nd season)
- Offensive scheme: Triple option
- Defensive coordinator: Blake Harrell (2nd season)
- Base defense: 4–3
- Home stadium: Johnson Hagood Stadium

2017 Southern Conference football standings
	Conf.			Overall
Team	W		L	W		L
No. 6 Wofford $^	7	–	1	10	–	3
No. 18 Samford ^	6	–	2	8	–	4
No. 19 Furman ^	6	–	2	8	–	5
Western Carolina	5	–	3	7	–	5
Mercer	4	–	4	5	–	6
The Citadel	3	–	5	5	–	6
Chattanooga	3	–	5	3	–	8
East Tennessee State	2	–	6	4	–	7
VMI	0	–	8	0	–	11
$ – Conference champion; ^ – FCS playoff participant; Rankings from STATS Poll

The 2017 The Citadel Bulldogs football team represented The Citadel, The Military College of South Carolina in the 2017 NCAA Division I FCS football season. The Bulldogs were led by second-year head coach Brent Thompson and played their home games at Johnson Hagood Stadium. They were members of the Southern Conference. They finished the season 5–6, 3–5 in SoCon play to finish in a tie for sixth place.

== Preseason ==
=== Preseason media poll ===
The SoCon released their preseason media poll on July 18, 2017, with the Bulldogs predicted to finish in second place, with six of 22 voters picking The Citadel first. The same day the coaches released their preseason poll with the Bulldogs also predicted to finish in second place.

Media poll
Predicted finish	Team	Votes (1st place)
1	Wofford	178 (11)
2	The Citadel	166 (6)
3	Samford	156 (3)
4	Chattanooga	152 (2)
5	Mercer	101
6	Furman	87
7	Western Carolina	71
8	ETSU	49
9	VMI	30

Coaches poll
Predicted finish	Team	Votes (1st place)
1	Wofford	63 (7)
2	The Citadel	54 (2)
3	Samford	52
4	Chattanooga	41
5	Mercer	32
6	Western Carolina	27
7	Furman	26
8	ETSU	17
9	VMI	12

=== Preseason All-SoCon Teams ===
The Bulldogs placed five players on the preseason all-SoCon teams, and Kailik Williams was named as preseason Defensive Player of the Year.

Defensive Player of the Year

Kailik Williams – DB

Offense

1st team

- Cam Jackson – RB
- Tyler Davis – OL

Defense

1st team

- Kailik Williams – DB

2nd team

- Ken Allen – DL
- Jonathan King – DL

== Schedule ==
Date	Time	Opponent	Rank	Site	TV	Result	Attendance
September 2	6:00 p.m.	Newberry*	No. 16	Johnson Hagood Stadium; Charleston, SC	7C, ESPN3	W 31–14	7,467
September 9	Noon	at Presbyterian*	No. 14	Bailey Memorial Stadium; Clinton, SC	BSN	W 48–7	2,586
September 16	1:00 p.m.	at East Tennessee State	No. 13	William B. Greene Jr. Stadium; Johnson City, TN	ESPN3	W 31–25	7,544
September 30	3:00 p.m.	at No. 25 Samford	No. 8	Seibert Stadium; Homewood, AL	ESPN3	L 14–35	9,233
October 7	2:00 p.m.	Mercer	No. 17	Johnson Hagood Stadium; Charleston, SC	ESPN3	L 14–24	9,969
October 14	6:00 p.m.	No. 5 Wofford	No. 23	Johnson Hagood Stadium; Charleston, SC (rivalry)	ESPN3	L 16–20	8,543
October 21	2:00 p.m.	at Chattanooga		Finley Stadium; Chattanooga, TN	ESPN3	W 20–14	7,521
October 28	2:00 p.m.	VMI^{†}		Johnson Hagood Stadium; Charleston, SC (Military Classic of the South)	7C, ESPN3	W 21–3	11,609
November 4	2:00 p.m.	No. 24 Western Carolina		Johnson Hagood Stadium; Charleston, SC	ESPN3	L 19–31	7,384
November 11	2:00 p.m.	at No. 21 Furman		Paladin Stadium; Greenville, SC (rivalry)	7C	L 20–56	10,105
November 18	12:20 p.m.	at No. 4 (FBS) Clemson*		Memorial Stadium; Clemson, SC	ACCN	L 3–61	80,618
*Non-conference game; ^{†}Homecoming; Rankings from STATS Poll released prior to the game; All times are in Eastern time

== Roster ==
2017 The Citadel Bulldogs football team roster
Players
Coaches
Offense

Pos.	#	Name	Class
RB	2	Rod Johnson	So
QB	4	Brian Murdaugh	Fr
QB	10	Jordan Black	So
QB	12	Ryan McCarthy	Fr
WR	13	Jalen Lampkin	Jr
WR	13	Cole Owens	Fr
FB	16	Brandon Rainey	So
WR	17	Logan Bailey	Fr
RB	18	Cam Jackson	Sr
QB	19	Dominique Allen	Sr
WR	21	Curt Nixon	So
WR	22	Raleigh Webb	Fr
RB	26	Keyonte Sessions	Fr
RB	29	Grant Drakeford	Jr
WR	30	Dante Smith	Fr
FB	31	Malik Brooks	Fr
FB	34	Evan McField	So
RB	36	Matthew Taylor	Fr
FB	37	Lorenzo Ward	So
WR	40	Jordan Williams	So
FB	41	Shy McPhail	Fr
FB	42	Brandon Berry	Fr
FB	44	Jordan Thomas	So
OL	52	Jon Barrett Lewis	Fr
OL	53	Tyler Davis	Jr
OL	54	Haden Haas	Fr
OL	56	Attorney Gallman	So
OL	57	Blake Harrison	Fr
OL	61	Mark Weakland	Fr
OL	62	Jonathan Cole	Fr
OL	63	Drew McIntyre	So
OL	64	Harry Easler	So
OL	67	Prince Howard-Whitaker	Fr
OL	70	Charley Conley	Fr
OL	73	Patrick Ivey	Fr
OL	73	Mike Rentz	Jr
OL	74	Nick Hudgens	Fr
OL	77	Tristan Harkleroad	Jr
WR	80	Josh LeBlanc	So
WR	81	Dijon Profit	Fr
WR	82	Rashad Riley	Fr
WR	83	Cardan Williams	Fr
WR	84	Liam Reid	Fr
WR	87	Cameron Roberts	Fr
WR	88	Peter Kennedy	So
OL		Nick Pappas	Fr

Defense

Pos.	#	Name	Class
DB	1	Shy Phillips	Sr
DB	3	Wally Wilmore	Fr
LB	5	Myles Pierce	Sr
DB	6	Lane Botkin	Fr
DB	7	Kailik Williams	Sr
LB	8	Israel Battle	Sr
DB	9	Khafari Buffalo	So
DB	11	Ben Roberts	Sr
DB	20	Jay Howard	Fr
DB	23	Tyus Carter	Sr
DB	24	Aron Span III	Jr
DB	25	Phil Barrett	Fr
DB	28	Chance Steverson	Fr
LB	32	Phil Davis	So
LB	33	Quinlan Washington	Jr
DB	34	Marvin Marshall	Fr
LB	38	Noah Dawkins	Jr
LB	39	Micah Byrd-Brown	Fr
DB	43	Jalen Barr	Fr
DB	45	Sean-Thomas Faulkner	Fr
DB	46	Carl Cunningham Jr.	Jr
LB	47	Jeremy Samuels	Fr
LB	48	Cody Floyd	Sr
DB	49	KD Frederick	Fr
LB	50	Willie Eubanks III	Fr
LB	52	K. J. Simpson	Fr
LB	55	Russell Hubbs	Jr
LB	58	Denzel Wright	Fr
LB	59	Adam Baker	Fr
DL	60	Adam Wawrzynski	So
LB	65	Colton Feinberg	Fr
DL	68	Ken Allen	Jr
LB	70	Collin Flanders	Fr
DL	71	Dalton Owens	Fr
DL	72	Sam Parker	Sr
DL	75	Bradley Carter	So
DL	76	Jabauri Garner	Fr
DL	79	Gunner Covey	Fr
DL	90	John Wesley Whiteside II	Fr
LB	92	Aaron Brawley	Fr
DL	94	A. J. Stokes	Fr
DL	95	Blake Oliveira	Fr
DL	96	Jalon Williams	So
DL	97	Jonathan King	Sr
DL	98	Joseph Randolph II	So
DL	99	Christian Weyrich	Fr

Special teams

Pos.	#	Name	Class
LS	57	Aaron Blaylock	So
K	69	Joshua Roides	Fr
LS	85	Patrick Keefe	Jr
K	86	Jacob Godek	So
P	93	Gage Russell	Fr

Head coach

- Brent Thompson (2nd season)

Coordinators/assistant coaches

- Blake Harrell – Defensive Coordinator / Linebackers
- Lou Conte - Offensive Coordinator / QBs / B-Backs
- J.P. Gunter - Special Teams / A-Backs
- Ron Boyd - Offensive Line
- Charles Hopkins - Offensive Tackles
- Orlando Mitjans Jr. - Cornerbacks
- Brian Rucker - Wide Receivers
- Joel Taylor - Defensive Passing Game Coordinator / Safeties
- John Ward - Defensive Line / Academic Coordinator
- Scott Yielding - Outside Linebackers / Recruiting Coordinator
- Donnell Boucher - Strength and Conditioning
- Will Hornsby - Special Teams Quality Control
- Floris Mendonca - Video Coordinator
- Kate Yeager - Director of Personnel

Legend

- (C) Team captain
- (S) Suspended
- (I) Ineligible
- Injured
- Redshirt

Roster
Last update: December 6, 2020

== Game summaries ==
=== Newberry ===
Team	1	2	3	4	Total
Wolves	0	7	0	7	14
• No. 16 Bulldogs	7	7	7	10	31

- Date: September 2, 2017
- Location: Johnson Hagood Stadium, Charleston, SC
- Game start: 6:00 p.m. EST
- Elapsed time: 3:10
- Game attendance: 7,467
- Game weather: 85°F • N 10 • Mostly cloudy
- Referee: Thomas Graham
- TV announcers (7C/ESPN3): Kendall Lewis, James Riley, Eric Summers

Scoring summary
1	7:14	CIT	Grant Drakeford 29-yard run (Jacob Godek kick)	CIT 7–0
2	10:30	NEW	Darius Clark 3-yard run (Shea Rodgers kick)	7–7
2	1:28	CIT	Jordan Black 1-yard run (Godek kick)	CIT 14–7
3	0:37	CIT	Cam Jackson 74-yard run (Godek kick)	CIT 21–7
4	7:22	CIT	Josh LeBlanc 6-yard pass from Black (Godek kick)	CIT 28–7
4	4:28	NEW	Chance Walker 26-yard pass from Nick Jones (Rodgers kick)	CIT 28–14
4	0:17	CIT	Godek 37-yard field goal	CIT 31–14

=== At Presbyterian ===
Team	1	2	3	4	Total
• No. 14 Bulldogs	14	21	6	7	48
Blue Hose	7	0	0	0	7

- Date: September 9, 2017
- Location: Bailey Memorial Stadium, Clinton, SC
- Game start: Noon EST
- Elapsed time: 2:26
- Game attendance: 2,586
- Game weather: 73°F • NNE 12 • Sunny
- Referee: Greg Waybright
- TV announcers (BSN/ESPN3): Kendall Lewis, James Riley, Eric Summers

Scoring summary
1	6:36	CIT	Dominique Allen 1-yard run (Jacob Godek kick)	CIT 7–0
1	6:18	PRE	Torrance Marable 76-yard run (Brett Norton kick)	7–7
1	1:55	CIT	Lorenzo Ward 5-yard run (Jacob Godek kick)	CIT 14–7
2	13:21	CIT	Raleigh Webb 57-yard pass from Jordan Black (Godek kick)	CIT 21–7
2	8:22	CIT	Rod Johnson 18-yard pass from Black (Godek kick)	CIT 28–7
2	1:09	CIT	Allen 1-yard run (Godek kick)	CIT 35–7
3	5:41	CIT	Allen 2-yard run (Godek kick failed)	CIT 41–7
4	5:27	CIT	Brandon Rainey 14-yard pass from Black (Godek kick)	CIT 48–7

=== At East Tennessee State ===
Team	1	2	3	4	Total
• No. 13 Bulldogs	7	0	7	17	31
Buccaneers	7	7	3	8	25

- Date: September 16, 2017
- Location: William B. Greene Jr. Stadium, Johnson City, TN
- Game start: 1:00 p.m. EST
- Elapsed time: 3:02
- Game attendance: 7,544
- Game weather: 80°F • NE 6 • Mostly Sunny
- Referee: Larry Adcock
- TV announcers (ESPN3): David Jackson, Mark Hutsell, Kasey Marler

Scoring summary
1	12:38	ETSU	Vincent Lowe 22-yard pass from Austin Herink (JJ Jerman kick)	ETSU 7–0
1	7:10	CIT	Brandon Rainey 10-yard run (Jacob Godek kick)	7–7
2	1:05	ETSU	Drake Powell 8-yard pass from Austin Herink (JJ Jerman kick)	ETSU 14–7
3	11:01	ETSU	JJ Jerman 46-yard field goal	ETSU 17–7
3	4:17	CIT	Dominique Allen 1-yard run (Godek kick)	ETSU 17–14
4	11:42	CIT	Raleigh Webb 7-yard run (Godek kick)	CIT 21–17
4	7:50	CIT	Webb 28-yard pass from Allen (Godek kick)	CIT 28–17
4	5:15	ETSU	Jajuan Stinson 4-yard run (Austin Herink pass to Kobe Kelley for two-point conv.)	CIT 28–25
4	2:17	CIT	Godek 46-yard field goal	CIT 31–25

=== At Samford ===
Team	1	2	3	4	Total
No. 8 Bulldogs (CIT)	0	7	7	0	14
• No. 25 Bulldogs (SAM)	28	7	0	0	35

- Date: September 30, 2017
- Location: Seibert Stadium, Homewood, AL
- Game start: 3:00 p.m. EST
- Elapsed time: 2:58
- Game attendance: 9,233
- Game weather: 79°F • NE 6 • Clear and sunny
- Referee: Jerry Welmaker
- TV announcers (ESPN3): Curt Bloom, Chad Pilcher, Hattie Breece

Scoring summary
1	14:00	SAM	Kelvin McKnight 8-yard pass from Devlin Hodges (Jordan Weaver kick)	SAM 7–0
1	11:56	SAM	Yassar El-Amin 70-yard pass from Hodges (Weaver kick)	SAM 14–0
1	9:40	SAM	Moise Satine 10-yard run (Weaver kick)	SAM 21–0
1	4:!9	SAM	Devlin Hodges 1-yard run (Weaver kick)	SAM 28–0
2	10:39	SAM	T.D. Marshall 63-yard pass from Hodges (Weaver kick)	SAM 35–0
2	6:55	CIT	Jordan Black 1-yard run (Jacob Godek kick)	SAM 35–7
3	8:41	CIT	Brandon Rainey 8-yard run (Godek kick)	SAM 35–14

=== Mercer ===
Team	1	2	3	4	Total
• Bears	7	7	7	3	24
No. 17 Bulldogs	0	0	0	14	14

- Date: October 7, 2017
- Location: Johnson Hagood Stadium, Charleston, SC
- Game start: 2:00 p.m. EST
- Elapsed time: 3:21
- Game attendance: 9,969
- Game weather: 85°F • Calm • Partly cloudy
- Referee: Edwin Lee
- TV announcers (ESPN3): Kevin Fitzgerald, James Riley

Scoring summary
1	9:19	MER	CJ Leggett 1-yard run (Cole Fisher kick)	MER 7–0
2	4:29	MER	Tee Mitchell 16-yard run (Fisher kick)	MER 14–0
3	2:57	MER	Mitchell 2-yard run (Fisher kick)	MER 21–0
4	13:17	CIT	Dominique Allen 1-yard run (Jacob Godek kick)	MER 21–7
4	3:59	MER	Cole Fisher 29-yard field goal	MER 24–7
4	2:33	CIT	Brandon Berry 2-yard run (Godek kick)	MER 24–14

=== Wofford ===
Team	1	2	3	4	Total
• No. 5 Terriers	0	7	7	6	20
No. 23 Bulldogs	7	7	2	0	16

- Date: October 14, 2017
- Location: Johnson Hagood Stadium, Charleston, SC
- Game start: 6:00 p.m. EST
- Elapsed time: 3:03
- Game attendance: 8,549
- Game weather: Low 80s • Calm • Mostly clear
- Referee: Thomas Graham
- TV announcers (ESPN3): Kevin Fitzgerald, James Riley

Scoring summary
1	7:28	CIT	Dominique Allen 7-yard run (Jacob Godek kick)	CIT 7–0
2	8:24	WOF	Brandon Goodson 1-yard run (Luke Carter kick)	7–7
2	0:11	CIT	Rod Johnson 2-yard run (Godek kick)	CIT 14–7
3	13:15	WOF	Jason Hill 59-yard pass from Brandon Goodson (Luke Carter kick)	14–14
3	8:07	CIT	Team 2-yard Safety	CIT 16–14
4	1:10	WOF	Andre Stoddard 3-yard run (Lennox McAfee rush failed)	WOF 20–16

=== At Chattanooga ===
Team	1	2	3	4	Total
• Bulldogs	0	7	6	7	20
Mocs	7	7	0	0	14

- Date: October 21, 2017
- Location: Finley Stadium, Chattanooga, TN
- Game start: 2:00 p.m. EST
- Elapsed time: 2:44
- Game attendance: 7,521
- Game weather: 74°F • SE 3 • Partly cloudy
- Referee: B. Johnson
- TV announcers (ESPN3): Chris Goforth, B.J. Coleman

Scoring summary
1	0:17	CHA	Darrell Bridges 61-yard run (Victor Ulmo kick)	CHA 7–0
2	11:15	CIT	Josh LeBlanc 25-yard pass from Dominique Allen (Jacob Godek kick)	7–7
2	4:09	CHA	Bridges 1-yard run (Ulmo kick)	CHA 14–7
3	10:05	CIT	Godek 45-yard field goal	CHA 14–10
3	1:51	CIT	Rod Johnson 4-yard run (Godek kick)	CIT 17–14
4	11:39	CIT	Godek 34-yard field goal	CIT 20–14

=== VMI ===
Homecoming

Team	1	2	3	4	Total
Keydets	3	0	0	0	3
• Bulldogs	14	0	0	7	21

- Date: October 28, 2017
- Location: Johnson Hagood Stadium, Charleston, SC
- Game start: 2:00 p.m. EST
- Elapsed time: 3:00
- Game attendance: 11,609
- Game weather: High 70's • Mostly cloudy
- Referee: Edwin Lee
- TV announcers (7C/ESPN3): Kendall Lewis, James Riley

Scoring summary
1	10:59	VMI	Grant Clemons 37-yard field goal	VMI 3–0
1	10:01	CIT	Grant Drakeford 71-yard run (Jacob Godek kick)	CIT 7–3
1	0:10	CIT	Dominique Allen 1-yard run (Godek kick)	CIT 14–3
4	2:45	CIT	Lorenzo Ward 45-yard run (Godek kick)	CIT 21–3

=== Western Carolina ===
Team	1	2	3	4	Total
• No. 24 Catamounts	7	10	7	7	31
Bulldogs	0	10	9	0	19

- Date: November 4, 2017
- Location: Johnson Hagood Stadium, Charleston, SC
- Game start: 2:00 p.m. EST
- Television network: ESPN3

Scoring summary
1	–
2	–
3	–
4	–

=== At Furman ===
Team	1	2	3	4	Total
Bulldogs	0	0	14	6	20
• No. 21 Paladins	14	21	14	7	56

- Date: November 11, 2016
- Location: Paladin Stadium, Greenville, SC
- Television network: 7C

Scoring summary
1	–
2	–
3	–
4	–

=== At Clemson ===
Team	1	2	3	4	Total
Bulldogs	0	0	0	3	3
• No. 4 (FBS) Tigers	21	17	20	3	61

- Date: November 18, 2017
- Location: Memorial Stadium, Clemson, SC

Scoring summary
1	–
2	–
3	–
4	–

== Ranking movements ==
Ranking movements Legend: ██ Increase in ranking ██ Decrease in ranking — = Not ranked RV = Received votes
	Week													
Poll	Pre	1	2	3	4	5	6	7	8	9	10	11	12	Final
STATS	16	14	13	10	8	17	23	RV	RV	RV	—	—	—	—
Coaches	12	13	13	10	11	17	22	RV	RV	RV	—	—	—	—
