= 2017 Furman Paladins football team =

American college football season

2017 Furman Paladins football

NCAA Division I Second Round, L 10–28 vs. Wofford
- Conference: Southern Conference

Ranking
- STATS: No. 22
- FCS Coaches: No. 25
- Record: 8–5 (6–2 SoCon)
- Head coach: Clay Hendrix (1st season)
- Offensive coordinator: Drew Cronic (1st season)
- Defensive coordinator: Chad Staggs (1st season)
- Captains: P. J. Blazejowski; Matthew Schmidt; Jaylan Reid; Dillon Woodruff
- Home stadium: Paladin Stadium

2017 Southern Conference football standings
	Conf.			Overall
Team	W		L	W		L
No. 6 Wofford $^	7	–	1	10	–	3
No. 18 Samford ^	6	–	2	8	–	4
No. 19 Furman ^	6	–	2	8	–	5
Western Carolina	5	–	3	7	–	5
Mercer	4	–	4	5	–	6
The Citadel	3	–	5	5	–	6
Chattanooga	3	–	5	3	–	8
East Tennessee State	2	–	6	4	–	7
VMI	0	–	8	0	–	11
$ – Conference champion; ^ – FCS playoff participant; Rankings from STATS Poll

The 2017 Furman Paladins team represented Furman University as a member of the Southern Conference (SoCon) during the 2017 NCAA Division I FCS football season. Led by first-year head coach Clay Hendrix, the Paladins compiled an overall record of 8–5 with a mark of 6–2 in conference play, tying for second-place in the SoCon. Furman received an at-large bid to the NCAA Division I Football Championship playoffs, where they defeated Elon in the first round before losing to the SoCon champion, Wofford, in the second round. The team played home games at Paladin Stadium in Greenville, South Carolina.

== Schedule ==
Date	Time	Opponent	Rank	Site	TV	Result	Attendance
September 2	6:00 p.m.	at No. 11 Wofford		Gibbs Stadium; Spartanburg, SC (rivalry)	ESPN3	L 23–24	7,237
September 9	1:00 p.m.	Elon*		Paladin Stadium; Greenville, SC	ESPN3	L 31–34	6,342
September 16	12:20 p.m.	at NC State*		Carter–Finley Stadium; Raleigh, NC	ACCN	L 16–49	56,166
September 23	1:00 p.m.	at Colgate*		Crown Field at Andy Kerr Stadium; Hamilton, NY	STADIUM	W 45–14	4,119
September 30	1:00 p.m.	East Tennessee State		Paladin Stadium; Greenville, SC	ESPN3	W 56–35	7,104
October 7	4:00 p.m.	at Chattanooga		Finley Stadium; Chattanooga, TN	ESPN3	W 41–17	9,651
October 14	1:00 p.m.	VMI		Paladin Stadium; Greenville, SC	ESPN3	W 42–10	7,216
October 21	1:30 p.m.	Mercer^{†}		Paladin Stadium; Greenville, SC	7C/ESPN3	W 28–21	8,108
October 28	3:30 p.m.	at No. 18 Western Carolina		Bob Waters Field at E. J. Whitmire Stadium; Cullowhee, NC	ESPN3	W 28–6	9,973
November 11	2:00 p.m.	The Citadel	No. 21	Paladin Stadium; Greenville, SC (rivalry)	7C/ESPN3	W 56–20	10,105
November 18	3:00 p.m.	at No. 17 Samford	No. 20	Seibert Stadium; Homewood, AL	STADIUM	L 20–26	4,673
November 25	2:00 p.m.	at No. 15 Elon*	No. 22	Rhodes Stadium; Elon, NC (NCAA Division I First Round)	ESPN3	W 28–27	2,934
December 2	2:00 p.m.	at No. 8 Wofford*	No. 22	Gibbs Stadium; Spartanburg, SC (NCAA Division I Second Round)	ESPN3	L 10–28	5,153
*Non-conference game; ^{†}Homecoming; Rankings from STATS Poll released prior to the game; All times are in Eastern time

== Game summaries ==
=== At Wofford ===
	1	2	3	4	Total
Paladins	3	7	7	6	23
No. 11 Terriers	7	3	0	14	24

=== Elon ===
	1	2	3	4	Total
Phoenix	21	0	3	10	34
Paladins	0	10	21	0	31

=== At NC State ===
	1	2	3	4	Total
Paladins	3	10	0	3	16
Wolfpack	14	14	21	0	49

=== At Colgate ===
	1	2	3	4	Total
Paladins	21	17	7	0	45
Raiders	0	7	7	0	14

=== East Tennessee State ===
	1	2	3	4	Total
Buccaneers	7	10	0	18	35
Paladins	14	14	14	14	56

=== At Chattanooga ===
	1	2	3	4	Total
Paladins	7	20	7	7	41
Mocs	3	7	0	7	17

=== VMI ===
	1	2	3	4	Total
Keydets	0	10	0	0	10
Paladins	7	7	14	14	42

=== Mercer ===
	1	2	3	4	Total
Bears	7	0	14	0	21
Paladins	0	14	7	7	28

=== At Western Carolina ===
	1	2	3	4	Total
Paladins	0	7	14	7	28
No. 18 Catamounts	0	0	0	6	6

=== The Citadel ===
	1	2	3	4	Total
Bulldogs	0	0	14	6	20
No. 21 Paladins	14	21	14	7	56

=== At Samford ===
	1	2	3	4	Total
No. 20 Paladins	7	10	0	3	20
No. 17 Bulldogs	7	10	6	3	26

=== At Elon—FCS First Round ===
	1	2	3	4	Total
No. 22 Paladins	0	14	7	7	28
No. 15 Phoenix	7	0	14	6	27

=== At Wofford—FCS Second Round ===
	1	2	3	4	Total
No. 22 Paladins	0	10	0	0	10
No. 8 Terriers	7	7	7	7	28
