= South's Oldest Rivalry (disambiguation) =

The South's Oldest Rivalry may refer to:

- South's Oldest Rivalry, the football game between the University of North Carolina at Chapel Hill and the University of Virginia
- Deep South's Oldest Rivalry, the football game between Auburn University and the University of Georgia
- Capital Cup, the football game between the College of William and Mary and the University of Richmond
- I-85 rivalry, the football game between Wofford College and Furman University, dating to 1889.
