= 2017 VMI Keydets football team =

American college football season

2017 VMI Keydets football
- Conference: Southern Conference
- Record: 0–11 (0–8 SoCon)
- Head coach: Scott Wachenheim (3rd season)
- Offensive coordinator: Dustin Ward (3rd season)
- Offensive scheme: Pro-style
- Defensive coordinator: Tom Clark (3rd season)
- Base defense: 3–4
- Home stadium: Alumni Memorial Field

2017 Southern Conference football standings
	Conf.			Overall
Team	W		L	W		L
No. 6 Wofford $^	7	–	1	10	–	3
No. 18 Samford ^	6	–	2	8	–	4
No. 19 Furman ^	6	–	2	8	–	5
Western Carolina	5	–	3	7	–	5
Mercer	4	–	4	5	–	6
The Citadel	3	–	5	5	–	6
Chattanooga	3	–	5	3	–	8
East Tennessee State	2	–	6	4	–	7
VMI	0	–	8	0	–	11
$ – Conference champion; ^ – FCS playoff participant; Rankings from STATS Poll

The 2017 VMI Keydets football team represented the Virginia Military Institute in the 2017 NCAA Division I FCS football season. It was VMI's 127th football season. The Keydets were led by third-year head coach Scott Wachenheim. They played their home games at 10,000–seat Alumni Memorial Field at Foster Stadium. This was VMI's fourth season as a member of the Southern Conference. They finished the season 0–11, 0–8 in SoCon play to finish in last place. This was VMI's fourth winless season and the first time they had gone winless since 2004.

== Schedule ==
Date	Time	Opponent	Site	TV	Result	Attendance
September 2	12:00 p.m.	at Air Force*	Falcon Stadium; Colorado Springs, CO	ESPN3	L 0–62	37,286
September 9	1:30 p.m.	Catawba*	Alumni Memorial Field; Lexington, VA	ESPN3	L 20–27	4,654
September 16	3:00 p.m.	at Robert Morris*	Joe Walton Stadium; Moon Township, PA	NECFR	L 0–23	2,634
September 23	1:30 p.m.	Chattanooga	Alumni Memorial Field; Lexington, VA	STADIUM	L 7–63	5,311
September 30	4:00 p.m.	at Mercer	Five Star Stadium; Macon, GA	ESPN3	L 14–49	10,207
October 7	1:30 p.m.	No. 20 Samford	Alumni Memorial Field; Lexington, VA	ESPN3	L 7–26	3,310
October 14	1:00 p.m.	at Furman	Paladin Stadium; Greenville, SC	ESPN3	L 10–42	7,216
October 21	1:30 p.m.	No. 19 Western Carolina	Alumni Memorial Field; Lexington, VA	ESPN3	L 7–26	4,119
October 28	2:00 p.m.	at The Citadel	Johnson Hagood Stadium; Charleston, SC (The Military Classic of the South)	ESPN3	L 3–21	11,609
November 4	12:00 p.m.	at East Tennessee State	William B. Greene Jr. Stadium; Johnson City, TN	ESPN3	L 6–24	7,327
November 11	1:30 p.m.	No. 8 Wofford	Alumni Memorial Field; Lexington, VA	ESPN3	L 14–45	4,229
*Non-conference game; Rankings from STATS Poll released prior to the game; All times are in Eastern time

== Game summaries ==
=== At Air Force ===
Quarter	1	2	3	4	Total
Keydets	0	0	0	0	0
Falcons	14	21	14	13	62

at Falcon Stadium (Colorado Springs, CO)

- Game time: Noon
- Game weather: N/A
- Game attendance: 37,286
- Referee: Michael VanderVelde
- TV: WatchESPN

VMI opened the season with their first ever matchup against Air Force. It was the first time the program played a game in Colorado and the farthest west VMI has ever travelled. The game started off poorly for the visitors, as VMI allowed the Falcons to march down the field for an eight-play, 65-yard drive capped off by a 27-yard touchdown run by Tim McVey. Later in the first quarter, Air Force quarterback Arion Worthman found Geraud Saunders for a 57-yard touchdown strike that put the Falcons ahead 14–0.

Air Force only piled on from there, as Worthman found Saunders in the endzone again to start the second, followed up by two rushing touchdowns in the final six minutes of the quarter, as the Falcons went into the locker room with a 35–0 advantage. More worrisome for the Keydets was that starting quarterback Austin Coulling was carted off the field in the second quarter after receiving a hit from Falcons safety Garrett Kauppila. Coulling did not return to the contest.

Air Force continued to pile on the scoring in the second half, as Malik Miller punched it into the endzone from five yards out. Later, Nolan Eriksen added a three-yard rushing score, and the Falcon defense would preserve the shutout, winning 62–0. VMI struggled offensively all day, gaining only six first downs to Air Force's 32. The Keydets had only 55 rushing yards, compared to the Falcons' 473. VMI used three quarterbacks—Coulling, Duncan Hodges, and Reece Udinski—who combined to complete 10 of 19 passes for only 40 yards with one interception, by Udinski. The loss marked the sixth consecutive season-opening defeat for VMI.

=== Catawba ===
Quarter	1	2	3	4	Total
Indians	0	0	7	20	27
Keydets	7	3	0	10	20

at Alumni Memorial Field (Lexington, VA)

- Game time: 1:30 pm
- Game weather: 67 degrees, wind 3-5 MPH, clear
- Game attendance: 4,654
- Referee: Jerry Welmaker
- TV: WatchESPN

VMI was hoping to earn their first win of the season over Division II-Catawba in their first meeting with the Indians since 1990. The game started off well for the Keydets, as running back Daz Palmer bursted up the middle on the team's first drive for a 56-yard score less than three minutes into the contest. From there, the game became a defensive grudgematch; the only other score of the half came on a 39-yard field goal by freshman kicker Grant Clemons at 10:28 of the second quarter, giving VMI a 10–0 advantage.

But the Indians managed to turn the tide early in the third, as the visitors concocted an eight-play, 91-yard touchdown drive that featured pass completions of 36 and 42 yards, punctuated with a one-yard plunge by Eamon Smart. After the rest of the third quarter went by without a score, Catawba took their first lead of the day with a 28-yard run by Kenyatta Greene less than two minutes in to the fourth. However, the Indians missed the extra-point, keeping it a three-point game.

From there, it was a back-and-forth affair. VMI quickly marched down the field but was stopped on third down in Indian territory, setting up another 39-yard field goal by Clemons, who had missed from forty yards earlier in the afternoon. But Catawba had the answer just four plays and 85 seconds later, as quarterback Patrick O'Brien hooked up with Sam Mobley for a 66-yard gain which took Catawba deep into Keydet territory. Then, the two found each other again in the endzone for a 13-yard score.

Down by seven, VMI responded again with a five-play touchdown drive that was capped off with a 26-yard run by Quan Mayers, evening the score at 20–20 with 7:32 to play. Catawba went three-and-out on their next possession, but VMI was unable to take advantage, failing to complete on a 3rd down in their own territory. This set up the would-be game-winning drive for the Indians, as O'Brien found Keyon West in the endzone from 25 yards out to put the visitors ahead 27–20. VMI had one final shot to tie it up, but on 3rd and 7 from VMI's 28-yard line, Coulling's pass was picked off by Jeremy Addison, preserving the Indians' upset win. The victory is believed to be Catawba's first over a Division I program.

=== At Robert Morris ===
	1	2	3	4	Total
Keydets	0	0	0	0	0
Colonials	14	0	6	3	23

=== Chattanooga ===
	1	2	3	4	Total
Mocs	21	21	7	14	63
Keydets	0	7	0	0	7

=== At Mercer ===
	1	2	3	4	Total
Keydets	7	0	7	0	14
Bears	0	21	14	14	49

=== Samford ===
	1	2	3	4	Total
No. 20 Bulldogs	10	10	3	3	26
Keydets	7	0	0	0	7

=== At Furman ===
	1	2	3	4	Total
Keydets	0	10	0	0	10
Paladins	7	7	14	14	42

=== At Western Carolina ===
	1	2	3	4	Total
Keydets	7	0	0	0	7
Catamounts	0	13	3	10	26

=== At The Citadel ===
	1	2	3	4	Total
Keydets	3	0	0	0	3
Bulldogs	14	0	0	7	21

=== At East Tennessee State ===
	1	2	3	4	Total
Keydets	0	3	3	0	6
Buccaneers	10	0	7	7	24

=== Wofford ===
	1	2	3	4	Total
Terriers	7	14	17	7	45
Keydets	0	7	0	7	14
