= 2017 Wofford Terriers football team =

American college football season

2017 Wofford Terriers football

Southern Conference champion

FCS Playoffs Quarterfinals, L 10–42 vs. North Dakota State
- Conference: Southern Conference

Ranking
- STATS: No. 6
- FCS Coaches: No. 7
- Record: 10–3 (7–1 SoCon)
- Head coach: Mike Ayers (30th season)
- Offensive coordinator: Wade Lang (30th season)
- Defensive coordinator: Shiel Wood (9th season)
- Home stadium: Gibbs Stadium

2017 Southern Conference football standings
	Conf.			Overall
Team	W		L	W		L
No. 6 Wofford $^	7	–	1	10	–	3
No. 18 Samford ^	6	–	2	8	–	4
No. 19 Furman ^	6	–	2	8	–	5
Western Carolina	5	–	3	7	–	5
Mercer	4	–	4	5	–	6
The Citadel	3	–	5	5	–	6
Chattanooga	3	–	5	3	–	8
East Tennessee State	2	–	6	4	–	7
VMI	0	–	8	0	–	11
$ – Conference champion; ^ – FCS playoff participant; Rankings from STATS Poll

The 2017 Wofford Terriers football team represented Wofford College in the 2017 NCAA Division I FCS football season. They were led by 30th-year head coach Mike Ayers and played their home games at Gibbs Stadium. They were a member of the Southern Conference. They finished the season 10–3, 7–1 in SoCon play to win the SoCon championship. They received the SoCon's automatic bid to the FCS Playoffs where they defeated Furman in the second round before losing in the quarterfinals to the eventual champion North Dakota State.

On December 13, head coach Mike Ayers announced his retirement. He finished at Wofford with a 30-year record of 207–139–1.

== Schedule ==
Date	Time	Opponent	Rank	Site	TV	Result	Attendance
September 2	6:00 p.m.	Furman	No. 11	Gibbs Stadium; Spartanburg, SC (rivalry)	ESPN3	W 24–23	7,237
September 9	4:00 p.m.	at Mercer	No. 10	Moye Complex; Macon, GA	ESPN3	W 28–27	11,727
September 23	1:30 p.m.	Gardner–Webb*	No. 9	Gibbs Stadium; Spartanburg, SC	ESPN3	W 27–24	7,211
September 30	7:00 p.m.	at Presbyterian*	No. 7	Bailey Memorial Stadium; Clinton, SC	BSN	W 31–7	2,862
October 7	1:30 p.m.	No. 22 Western Carolina	No. 5	Gibbs Stadium; Spartanburg, SC	ESPN3	W 35–28 ^{OT}	6,982
October 14	6:00 p.m.	at No. 23 The Citadel	No. 5	Johnson Hagood Stadium; Charleston, SC (rivalry)	ESPN3	W 20–16	8,543
October 21	1:30 p.m.	No. 16 Samford^{†}	No. 5	Gibbs Stadium; Spartanburg, SC	ESPN3	L 21–24	7,236
October 28	1:00 p.m.	at East Tennessee State	No. 8	William B. Greene Jr. Stadium; Johnson City, TN	ESPN3	W 31–24	7,087
November 4	1:30 p.m.	Chattanooga	No. 8	Gibbs Stadium; Spartanburg, SC	ESPN3	W 24–21 ^{2OT}	5,012
November 11	1:30 p.m.	at VMI	No. 8	Alumni Memorial Stadium; Lexington, VA	ESPN3	W 45–14	4,229
November 18	4:00 p.m.	at South Carolina*	No. 7	Williams-Brice Stadium; Columbia, SC	SECN	L 10–31	74,742
December 2	2:00 p.m.	No. 22 Furman*	No. 8	Gibbs Stadium; Spartanburg, SC (NCAA Division I Second Round, rivalry)	ESPN3	W 28–10	5,153
December 9	12:00 p.m.	at No. 4 North Dakota State*	No. 8	Fargodome; Fargo, ND (NCAA Division I Quarterfinal)	ESPN2	L 10–42	17,008
*Non-conference game; ^{†}Homecoming; Rankings from STATS Poll released prior to the game; All times are in Eastern time

== Game summaries ==
=== Furman ===
	1	2	3	4	Total
Paladins	3	7	7	6	23
No. 11 Terriers	7	3	0	14	24

=== At Mercer ===
	1	2	3	4	Total
No. 10 Terriers	0	7	7	14	28
Bears	14	7	0	6	27

=== Gardner–Webb ===
	1	2	3	4	Total
Runnin' Bulldogs	0	10	7	7	24
No. 9 Terriers	3	14	10	0	27

=== At Presbyterian ===
	1	2	3	4	Total
No. 7 Terriers	14	0	3	14	31
Blue Hose	0	7	0	0	7

=== Western Carolina ===
	1	2	3	4	OT	Total
No. 22 Catamounts	7	7	7	7	0	28
No. 5 Terriers	3	10	8	7	7	35

=== At The Citadel ===
	1	2	3	4	Total
No. 5 Terriers	0	7	7	6	20
No. 23 Bulldogs	7	7	2	0	16

=== Samford ===
	1	2	3	4	Total
No. 16 Bulldogs	0	7	7	10	24
No. 5 Terriers	7	0	0	14	21

=== At East Tennessee State ===
	1	2	3	4	Total
No. 8 Terriers	3	14	7	7	31
Buccaneers	0	10	7	7	24

=== Chattanooga ===
	1	2	3	4	OT	2OT	Total
Mocs	3	3	0	8	7	0	21
No. 8 Terriers	7	0	0	7	7	3	24

=== At VMI ===
	1	2	3	4	Total
No. 8 Terriers	7	14	17	7	45
Keydets	0	7	0	7	14

=== At South Carolina ===
	1	2	3	4	Total
No. 7 Terriers	3	0	7	0	10
Gamecocks	0	14	7	10	31

== FCS Playoffs ==
=== Furman–Second Round ===
	1	2	3	4	Total
No. 22 Paladins	0	10	0	0	10
No. 8 Terriers	7	7	7	7	28

=== At North Dakota State–Quarterfinals ===
	1	2	3	4	Total
No. 8 Terriers	3	7	0	0	10
No. 4 Bison	14	21	7	0	42

== Ranking movements ==
Ranking movements Legend: ██ Increase in ranking ██ Decrease in ranking
	Week													
Poll	Pre	1	2	3	4	5	6	7	8	9	10	11	12	Final
STATS FCS	11	10	11	9	7	5	5	5	8	8	8	7	8	6
Coaches	11	10	9	9	7	5	5	5	10	9	8	7	9	7
