= 2017 Mercer Bears football team =

American college football season

2017 Mercer Bears football
- Conference: Southern Conference
- Record: 5–6 (4–4 SoCon)
- Head coach: Bobby Lamb (5th season)
- Offensive coordinator: Casey Vogt (5th season)
- Defensive coordinator: Mike Kolakowski (5th season)
- Home stadium: Five Star Stadium

2017 Southern Conference football standings
	Conf.			Overall
Team	W		L	W		L
No. 6 Wofford $^	7	–	1	10	–	3
No. 18 Samford ^	6	–	2	8	–	4
No. 19 Furman ^	6	–	2	8	–	5
Western Carolina	5	–	3	7	–	5
Mercer	4	–	4	5	–	6
The Citadel	3	–	5	5	–	6
Chattanooga	3	–	5	3	–	8
East Tennessee State	2	–	6	4	–	7
VMI	0	–	8	0	–	11
$ – Conference champion; ^ – FCS playoff participant; Rankings from STATS Poll

The 2017 Mercer Bears football team represented Mercer University as a member the Southern Conference (SoCon) during the 2017 NCAA Division I FCS football season. They were led by fifth-year head coach Bobby Lamb and played their home games at the Moye Complex in Macon, Georgia. Mercer finished the season 5–6 overall and 4–4 in SoCon play to place fifth.

== Schedule ==
Date	Time	Opponent	Site	TV	Result	Attendance
August 31	7:00 p.m.	Jacksonville*	Five Star Stadium; Macon, GA	ESPN3	W 48–7	9,727
September 9	4:00 p.m.	No. 10 Wofford	Five Star Stadium; Macon, GA	ESPN3	L 27–28	11,727
September 16	4:00 p.m.	at No. 15 (FBS) Auburn*	Jordan–Hare Stadium; Auburn, AL	SECN	L 10–24	87,033
September 23	3:30 p.m.	at East Tennessee State	William B. Greene Jr. Stadium; Johnson City, TN	ESPN3	L 23–26 ^{OT}	8,022
September 30	4:00 p.m.	VMI	Five Star Stadium; Macon, GA	ESPN3	W 49–14	10,207
October 7	2:00 p.m.	at No. 17 The Citadel	Johnson Hagood Stadium; Charleston, SC	ESPN3	W 24–14	9,969
October 14	3:30 p.m.	Chattanooga	Five Star Stadium; Macon, GA	STADIUM	W 30–10	9,864
October 21	1:30 p.m.	at Furman	Paladin Stadium; Greenville, SC	ESPN3	L 21–28	8,108
November 4	3:00 p.m.	No. 16 Samford	Five Star Stadium; Macon, GA	ESPN3	L 3–20	10,200
November 11	2:00 p.m.	at No. 21 Western Carolina	E. J. Whitmire Stadium; Cullowhee, NC	ESPN3	W 35–33	10,681
November 18	12:00 p.m.	at No. 1 (FBS) Alabama*	Bryant–Denny Stadium; Tuscaloosa, AL	SECN	L 0–56	101,821
*Non-conference game; Rankings from STATS Poll released prior to the game; All times are in Eastern time
