= 2017 East Tennessee State Buccaneers football team =

American college football season

2017 East Tennessee State Buccaneers football
- Conference: Southern Conference
- Record: 4–7 (2–6 SoCon)
- Head coach: Carl Torbush (3rd season)
- Offensive coordinator: Mike O'Cain (3rd season)
- Defensive coordinator: Billy Taylor (3rd season)
- Home stadium: William B. Greene Jr. Stadium

2017 Southern Conference football standings
	Conf.			Overall
Team	W		L	W		L
No. 6 Wofford $^	7	–	1	10	–	3
No. 18 Samford ^	6	–	2	8	–	4
No. 19 Furman ^	6	–	2	8	–	5
Western Carolina	5	–	3	7	–	5
Mercer	4	–	4	5	–	6
The Citadel	3	–	5	5	–	6
Chattanooga	3	–	5	3	–	8
East Tennessee State	2	–	6	4	–	7
VMI	0	–	8	0	–	11
$ – Conference champion; ^ – FCS playoff participant; Rankings from STATS Poll

The 2017 East Tennessee State Buccaneers football team represented East Tennessee State University (ETSU) in the 2017 NCAA Division I FCS football season and are in the second year of their second stint as football members of the Southern Conference (SoCon). They are led by third-year head coach Carl Torbush and, for the first time, play all their home games at William B. Greene Jr. Stadium. They finished the season 4–7, 2–6 in SoCon play to finish in eighth place.

On December 8, head coach Carl Torbush announced his retirement. He finished at ETSU with a three-year record of 11–22.

== Schedule ==
Date	Time	Opponent	Site	TV	Result	Attendance
September 2	7:00 p.m.	Limestone*	William B. Greene Jr. Stadium; Johnson City, TN	ESPN3	W 31–10	9,530
September 9	6:00 p.m.	at No. 1 James Madison*	Bridgeforth Stadium; Harrisonburg, VA	CSN MA+	L 10–52	17,118
September 16	1:00 p.m.	No. 13 The Citadel	William B. Greene Jr. Stadium; Johnson City, TN	ESPN3	L 25–31	7,544
September 23	3:30 p.m.	Mercer	William B. Greene Jr. Stadium; Johnson City, TN	ESPN3	W 26–23 ^{OT}	8,022
September 30	1:00 p.m.	at Furman	Paladin Stadium; Greenville, SC	ESPN3	L 35–56	7,104
October 7	3:30 p.m.	Robert Morris*^{†}	William B. Greene Jr. Stadium; Johnson City, TN	ESPN3	W 16–3	8,540
October 14	3:30 p.m.	at No. 21 Western Carolina	Bob Waters Field at E. J. Whitmire Stadium; Cullowhee, NC	ESPN3	L 10–49	8,300
October 28	1:00 p.m.	No. 8 Wofford	William B. Greene Jr. Stadium; Johnson City, TN	ESPN3	L 24–31	7,087
November 4	12:00 p.m.	VMI	William B. Greene Jr. Stadium; Johnson City, TN	ESPN3	W 24–6	7,327
November 11	3:00 p.m.	at No. 16 Samford	Seibert Stadium; Homewood, AL	7C, ESPN3	L 7–42	5,178
November 18	2:00 p.m.	at Chattanooga	Finley Stadium; Chattanooga, TN	ESPN3	L 3–10	8,434
*Non-conference game; ^{†}Homecoming; Rankings from STATS Poll released prior to the game; All times are in Eastern time

== Game summaries ==
=== Limestone ===
	1	2	3	4	Total
Saints	0	3	7	0	10
Buccaneers	7	14	7	3	31

=== At James Madison ===
	1	2	3	4	Total
Buccaneers	0	7	3	0	10
No. 1 Dukes	21	7	17	7	52

=== The Citadel ===
	1	2	3	4	Total
No. 13 Bulldogs	7	0	7	17	31
Buccaneers	7	7	3	8	25

=== Mercer ===
	1	2	3	4	OT	Total
Bears	0	6	14	0	3	23
Buccaneers	7	3	0	10	6	26

=== At Furman ===
	1	2	3	4	Total
Buccaneers	7	10	0	18	35
Paladins	14	14	14	14	56

=== Robert Morris ===
	1	2	3	4	Total
Colonials	0	0	0	3	3
Buccaneers	3	7	6	0	16

=== Western Carolina ===
	1	2	3	4	Total
Buccaneers	3	0	0	7	10
No. 21 Catamounts	0	7	21	21	49

=== Wofford ===
	1	2	3	4	Total
No. 8 Terriers	3	14	7	7	31
Buccaneers	0	10	7	7	24

=== VMI ===
	1	2	3	4	Total
Keydets	0	3	3	0	6
Buccaneers	10	0	7	7	24

=== At Samford ===
	1	2	3	4	Total
Buccaneers	0	7	0	0	7
No. 16 Bulldogs	14	21	0	7	42

=== At Chattanooga ===
	1	2	3	4	Total
Buccaneers	3	0	0	0	3
Mocs	0	0	10	0	10
