= 2017 Samford Bulldogs football team =

American college football season

2017 Samford Bulldogs football

FCS Playoffs First Round, L 17–28 vs. Kennesaw State
- Conference: Southern Conference

Ranking
- STATS: No. 18
- FCS Coaches: No. 17
- Record: 8–4 (6–2 SoCon)
- Head coach: Chris Hatcher (3rd season)
- Offensive coordinator: Russ Callaway (2nd season)
- Offensive scheme: Air raid
- Defensive coordinator: Bill D'Ottavio (11th season)
- Base defense: 4–3
- Home stadium: Seibert Stadium

2017 Southern Conference football standings
	Conf.			Overall
Team	W		L	W		L
No. 6 Wofford $^	7	–	1	10	–	3
No. 18 Samford ^	6	–	2	8	–	4
No. 19 Furman ^	6	–	2	8	–	5
Western Carolina	5	–	3	7	–	5
Mercer	4	–	4	5	–	6
The Citadel	3	–	5	5	–	6
Chattanooga	3	–	5	3	–	8
East Tennessee State	2	–	6	4	–	7
VMI	0	–	8	0	–	11
$ – Conference champion; ^ – FCS playoff participant; Rankings from STATS Poll

The 2017 Samford Bulldogs football team represented Samford University in the 2017 NCAA Division I FCS football season. They were led by third-year head coach Chris Hatcher and played their home games at Seibert Stadium. They were a member of the Southern Conference (SoCon). They finished the season 8–4, 6–2 in SoCon play to finish in a tie for second place. They received an at-large bid to the FCS Playoffs, where they lost to Kennesaw State in the first round.

== Schedule ==
Date	Time	Opponent	Rank	Site	TV	Result	Attendance
August 31	6:00 p.m.	Kennesaw State*	No. 19	Seibert Stadium; Homewood, AL	ESPN3	W 28–23	4,908
September 7	6:00 p.m.	West Alabama*	No. 17	Seibert Stadium; Homewood, AL	ESPN3	W 49–41	4,509
September 16	6:30 p.m.	at No. 13 (FBS) Georgia*	No. 17	Sanford Stadium; Athens, GA	SECN	L 14–42	92,746
September 23	2:30 p.m.	at Western Carolina	No. 18	E. J. Whitmire Stadium; Cullowhee, NC	ESPN3	L 34–38	12,018
September 30	2:00 p.m.	No. 8 The Citadel	No. 25	Seibert Stadium; Homewood, AL	ESPN3	W 35–14	9,233
October 7	12:30 p.m.	at VMI	No. 20	Alumni Memorial Field; Lexington, VA	ESPN3	W 26–7	3,310
October 21	12:30 p.m.	at No. 5 Wofford	No. 16	Gibbs Stadium; Spartanburg, SC	ESPN3	W 24–21	7,236
October 28	2:00 p.m.	Chattanooga	No. 9	Seibert Stadium; Homewood, AL	ESPN3	L 21–23	3,523
November 4	2:00 p.m.	at Mercer	No. 16	Moye Complex; Macon, GA	ESPN3	W 20–3	10,200
November 11	2:00 p.m.	East Tennessee State^{†}	No. 16	Seibert Stadium; Homewood, AL	ESPN3	W 42–7	5,178
November 18	2:30 p.m.	No. 20 Furman	No. 17	Seibert Stadium; Homewood, AL	STADIUM	W 26–20	4,673
November 25	1:00 p.m.	at No. 18 Kennesaw State*	No. 14	Fifth Third Bank Stadium; Kennesaw, GA (NCAA Division I First Round)	ESPN3	L 17–28	5,566
*Non-conference game; ^{†}Homecoming; Rankings from STATS Poll released prior to the game; All times are in Central time

== Game summaries ==
=== Kennesaw State ===
Kennesaw State @ Samford

Team	1	2	3	4	Total
Owls	0	10	0	13	23
• No. 19 Bulldogs	0	7	14	7	28

- Date: August 31
- Location: Seibert Stadium
  Homewood, AL
- Game start: 6:00 p.m. CDT
- Game attendance: 4,908
- Television network: ESPN3

=== West Alabama ===
West Alabama @ Samford

Team	1	2	3	4	Total
Tigers	0	7	14	20	41
• No. 17 Bulldogs	14	21	7	7	49

- Date: September 7
- Location: Seibert Stadium
  Homewood, AL
- Game start: 6:00 p.m. CDT
- Game attendance: 4,509
- Television network: ESPN3

=== @ Georgia ===
Samford @ Georgia

Team	1	2	3	4	Total
No. 17 Bulldogs (SAM)	0	7	0	7	14
• No. 13 (FBS) Bulldogs (UGA)	14	7	21	0	42

- Date: September 16
- Location: Sanford Stadium
  Athens, GA
- Game start: 6:30 p.m. CDT
- Game attendance: 92,746
- Television network: SECN

=== @ Western Carolina ===
Samford @ Western Carolina

Team	1	2	3	4	Total
No. 18 Bulldogs	7	7	13	7	34
• Catamounts	10	7	7	14	38

- Date: September 23
- Location: Bob Waters Field at E. J. Whitmire Stadium
  Cullowhee, NC
- Game start: 2:30 p.m. CDT
- Game attendance: 12,018
- Television network: ESPN3

=== The Citadel ===
The Citadel @ Samford

Team	1	2	3	4	Total
No. 8 Bulldogs (CIT)	0	7	7	0	14
• No. 25 Bulldogs (SAM)	28	7	0	0	35

- Date: September 30
- Location: Seibert Stadium
  Homewood, AL
- Game start: 2:00 p.m. CDT
- Game attendance: 9,233
- Television network: ESPN3

=== @ VMI ===
Samford @ VMI

Team	1	2	3	4	Total
• No. 20 Bulldogs	10	10	3	3	26
Keydets	7	0	0	0	7

- Date: October 7
- Location: Alumni Memorial Field
  Lexington, VA
- Game start: 12:30 p.m. CDT
- Game attendance: 3,310
- Television network: ESPN3

=== @ Wofford ===
Samford @ Wofford

Team	1	2	3	4	Total
• No. 16 Bulldogs	0	7	7	10	24
No. 5 Terriers	7	0	0	14	21

- Date: October 21
- Location: Gibbs Stadium
  Spartanburg, SC
- Game start: 12:30 p.m. CDT
- Game attendance: 7,236
- Television network: ESPN3

=== Chattanooga ===
Chattanooga @ Samford

Team	1	2	3	4	Total
• Mocs	0	14	6	3	23
No. 8 Bulldogs	7	0	0	14	21

- Date: October 28
- Location: Seibert Stadium
  Homewood, AL
- Game start: 2:00 p.m. CDT
- Game attendance: 3,523
- Television network: ESPN3

=== @ Mercer ===
Samford @ Mercer

Team	1	2	3	4	Total
• No. 16 Bulldogs	0	10	8	2	20
Bears	0	3	0	0	3

- Date: November 4
- Location: Moye Complex
  Macon, GA
- Game start: 2:00 p.m. CDT
- Game attendance: 10,200
- Television network: ESPN3

=== East Tennessee State ===
East Tennessee State @ Samford

Team	1	2	3	4	Total
Buccaneers	0	7	0	0	7
• No. 16 Bulldogs	14	21	0	7	42

- Date: November 11
- Location: Seibert Stadium
  Homewood, AL
- Game start: 2:00 p.m. CST
- Game attendance: 5,178
- Television network: ESPN3

=== Furman ===
Furman @ Samford

Team	1	2	3	4	Total
No. 20 Paladins	7	10	0	3	20
• No. 17 Bulldogs	7	10	6	3	26

- Date: November 18
- Location: Seibert Stadium
  Homewood, AL
- Game start: 2:30 p.m. CST
- Game attendance: 4,673
- Television network: ESPN3

== FCS Playoffs ==
=== @ Kennesaw State–First Round ===
Samford @ Kennesaw State

Team	1	2	3	4	Total
No. 14 Bulldogs	3	7	0	7	17
• No. 18 Owls	0	21	7	0	28

- Date: November 25
- Location: Fifth Third Bank Stadium
  Kennesaw, GA
- Game start: 12:00 p.m. EST
- Game attendance: 5,566
- Television network: ESPN3

== Ranking movements ==
Ranking movements Legend: ██ Increase in ranking ██ Decrease in ranking
	Week													
Poll	Pre	1	2	3	4	5	6	7	8	9	10	11	12	Final
STATS FCS	19	17	17	18	25	20	19	16	9	16	16	17	14	18
Coaches	19	17	17	17	23	20	18	18	8	15	14	13	14	17
