= Bobby Lamb (American football) =

American football player and coach (born 1962)

Current position
- Title: Head coach
- Team: Anderson (SC)
- Conference: SAC
- Record: 8–14

Biographical details
- Born: December 24, 1962 (age 63); Augusta, Georgia, U.S.

Playing career
- 1982–1985: Furman
- Position: Quarterback

Coaching career (HC unless noted)
- 1986: Furman (SA)
- 1987–1988: Furman (DE)
- 1989–1992: Furman (QB)
- 1993–1998: Furman (QB/WR)
- 1999–2001: Furman (QB)
- 2002–2010: Furman
- 2011–2019: Mercer
- 2020: Louisiana (analyst)
- 2021–present: Anderson (SC)

Head coaching record
- Overall: 116–93
- Tournaments: 3–4 (NCAA D-I-AA/FCS playoffs)

Accomplishments and honors

Championships
- 1 SoCon (2004)

Awards
- SoCon Coach of the Year (2004)

Robert Emory Lamb (born December 24, 1962) is an American college football coach and former player. He is the head football coach for Anderson University, a position he has held since 2021. He was previously the head football coach at Mercer University, a position he assumed in 2011 when Mercer reinstated their football program after a 72-year hiatus. The Mercer Bears football program resumed play in 2013. Lamb served as the head football coach at Furman University from 2002 until his resignation in 2010.

== Playing career ==
Lamb attended Commerce High School in Commerce, Georgia, from 1978 to 1981, where he played quarterback. Along with current Furman University head football coach Clay Hendrix He led the team to the 1981 AA State Championship and was named The Atlanta Journal-Constitution's AA Back of the Year.

From 1982 to 1985, Lamb played quarterback for the Furman Paladins, a Division I-AA program, where he was a two-year starter. During Lamb's playing career, the Paladins defeated three Division I-A teams: South Carolina (1982), Georgia Tech (1983), and NC State (1984 and 1985). In 1985, Lamb helped lead the Paladins to the Southern Conference championship, and he was named Southern Conference Player of the Year. The Paladins suffered a two-point loss to Georgia Southern in the 1985 NCAA Division I-AA Football Championship Game, with Lamb throwing for one touchdown and rushing for another.

== Coaching career ==
Lamb began coaching as an assistant for the Paladins in 1986 and was the defensive ends coach on the 1988 team that won the NCAA Division I-AA Football Championship. He became the quarterbacks coach in 1989, a position filled until taking over head coaching duties in 2002. In November 2010, he announced his resignation from Furman after the team had missed the playoffs four straight years.

On January 20, 2011, Lamb was announced be the first modern head football coach for Mercer University, which began playing football in 2013 after the sport's 70-year absence from campus.

On November 24, 2019, Lamb was terminated as Mercer's football coach after the team went 4–8 that season, including 3–5 in the Southern Conference. He finished with an overall record of 41–39 after seven seasons.

Lamb is set to become the first ever football coach of Anderson University (Anderson, SC) in 2024, once the program begins.

== Personal ==
Lamb has a brother, Hal, who was the head football coach and athletic director at Calhoun High School in Calhoun, Georgia. Lamb is active in bringing about public awareness of shoulder Cleidocranial dysplasia. Lamb's son Taylor was quarterback for the Appalachian State Mountaineers from 2014 to 2017 and is QB Coach for the University of Virginia. His nephew is Tulsa head coach Tre Lamb.

== Head coaching record ==
Year	Team	Overall	Conference	Standing	Bowl/playoffs	TSN^{#}	USA/ESPN^{°}
Furman Paladins (Southern Conference) (2002–2010)
2002	Furman	8–4	6–2	2nd	L NCAA Division I-AA First Round	9	9
2003	Furman	6–5	4–4	4th			
2004	Furman	10–3	6–1	T–1st	L NCAA Division I-AA Quarterfinal	5	5
2005	Furman	11–3	5–2	T–2nd	L NCAA Division I-AA Semifinal	3	3
2006	Furman	8–4	6–1	2nd	L NCAA Division I First Round	12	
2007	Furman	6–5	4–3	T–3rd			
2008	Furman	7–5	4–4	3rd			
2009	Furman	6–5	5–3	3rd			
2010	Furman	5–6	3–5	6th			
Furman:		67–40	43–25				
Mercer Bears (Pioneer Football League) (2013)
2013	Mercer	10–2	6–2	3rd			
Mercer Bears (Southern Conference) (2014–2019)
2014	Mercer	6–6	1–6	T–7th			
2015	Mercer	5–6	2–5	T–6th			
2016	Mercer	6–5	4–4	5th			
2017	Mercer	5–6	4–4	5th			
2018	Mercer	5–6	4–4	T–5th			
2019	Mercer	4–8	3–5	7th			
Mercer:		41–39	24–30				
Anderson Trojans (South Atlantic Conference) (2024–present)
2024	Anderson	3–8	1–7	T–5th (Mountain)			
2025	Anderson	5–6	3–6	8th			
2026	Anderson	0–0	0–0				
Anderson:		8–14	4–13				
Total:		116–93					
National championship Conference title Conference division title or championship game berth
