= 2017 Chattanooga Mocs football team =

American college football season

2017 Chattanooga Mocs football
- Conference: Southern Conference
- Record: 3–8 (3–5 SoCon)
- Head coach: Tom Arth (1st season)
- Offensive coordinator: Justin Rascati (1st season)
- Defensive coordinator: Brandon Staley (1st season)
- Home stadium: Finley Stadium

2017 Southern Conference football standings
	Conf.			Overall
Team	W		L	W		L
No. 6 Wofford $^	7	–	1	10	–	3
No. 18 Samford ^	6	–	2	8	–	4
No. 19 Furman ^	6	–	2	8	–	5
Western Carolina	5	–	3	7	–	5
Mercer	4	–	4	5	–	6
The Citadel	3	–	5	5	–	6
Chattanooga	3	–	5	3	–	8
East Tennessee State	2	–	6	4	–	7
VMI	0	–	8	0	–	11
$ – Conference champion; ^ – FCS playoff participant; Rankings from STATS Poll

The 2017 Chattanooga Mocs football team represented the University of Tennessee at Chattanooga in the 2017 NCAA Division I FCS football season as a member of the Southern Conference (SoCon). The Mocs were led by first-year head coach Tom Arth and played their home games at Finley Stadium in Chattanooga, Tennessee. They finished the season 3–8 overall and 3–5 in SoCon play to tie for sixth place.

== Schedule ==
Date	Time	Opponent	Rank	Site	TV	Result	Attendance
August 26	7:00 p.m.	vs. No. 6 Jacksonville State*	No. 12	Cramton Bowl; Montgomery, AL (FCS Kickoff)	ESPN	L 13–27	12,952
September 9	6:00 p.m.	at No. 12 (FBS) LSU*	No. 13	Tiger Stadium; Baton Rouge, LA	SECN	L 10–45	97,289
September 16	6:00 p.m.	UT Martin*	No. 15	Finley Stadium; Chattanooga, TN	ESPN3	L 7–21	10,141
September 23	1:30 p.m.	at VMI		Alumni Memorial Field; Lexington, VA	STADIUM	W 63–7	5,311
September 30	6:00 p.m.	Western Carolina		Finley Stadium; Chattanooga, TN	ESPN3	L 7–45	10,101
October 7	4:00 p.m.	Furman^{†}		Finley Stadium; Chattanooga, TN	ESPN3	L 17–41	9,651
October 14	3:30 p.m.	at Mercer		Moye Complex; Macon, GA	STADIUM	L 10–30	9,864
October 21	2:00 p.m.	The Citadel		Finley Stadium; Chattanooga, TN	ESPN3	L 14–20	7,521
October 28	2:00 p.m.	at No. 9 Samford		Seibert Stadium; Homewood, AL	ESPN3	W 23–21	3,523
November 4	1:30 p.m	at No. 8 Wofford		Gibbs Stadium; Spartanburg, SC	ESPN3	L 21–24 ^{2OT}	5,012
November 18	2:00 p.m	East Tennessee State		Finley Stadium; Chattanooga, TN	ESPN3	W 10–3	8,434
*Non-conference game; ^{†}Homecoming; Rankings from STATS Poll released prior to the game; All times are in Eastern time

== Game summaries ==
=== vs Jacksonville State ===
	1	2	3	4	Total
No. 6 Gamecocks	10	0	10	7	27
No. 12 Mocs	3	3	0	7	13

=== At LSU ===
	1	2	3	4	Total
No. 13 Mocs	3	0	0	7	10
No. 12 (FBS) Tigers	14	14	14	3	45

=== UT Martin ===
	1	2	3	4	Total
Skyhawks	7	7	7	7	28
No. 15 Mocs	0	0	7	0	7

=== At VMI ===
	1	2	3	4	Total
Mocs	21	21	7	14	63
Keydets	0	7	0	0	7

=== Western Carolina ===
	1	2	3	4	Total
Mocs	0	0	0	7	7
Catamounts	10	14	14	7	45

=== Furman ===
	1	2	3	4	Total
Paladins	7	20	7	7	41
Mocs	3	7	0	7	17

=== At Mercer ===
	1	2	3	4	Total
Mocs	0	3	0	7	10
Bears	0	13	10	7	30

=== The Citadel ===
	1	2	3	4	Total
Bulldogs	0	7	10	3	20
Mocs	7	7	0	0	14

=== At Samford ===
	1	2	3	4	Total
Mocs	0	14	6	3	23
No. 9 Bulldogs	7	0	0	14	21

=== At Wofford ===
	1	2	3	4	OT	2OT	Total
Mocs	3	3	0	8	7	0	21
No. 8 Terriers	7	0	0	7	7	3	24

=== East Tennessee State ===
	1	2	3	4	Total
Buccaneers	3	0	0	0	3
Mocs	0	0	10	0	10

== Ranking movements ==
Ranking movements Legend: ██ Increase in ranking ██ Decrease in ranking — = Not ranked RV = Received votes
	Week													
Poll	Pre	1	2	3	4	5	6	7	8	9	10	11	12	Final
STATS	12	13	15	RV	RV	RV	—	—	—	—	—	—	—	—
Coaches	13	14	15	RV	RV	—	—	—	—	—	—	—	—	—
