= Furman–Wofford football rivalry =

American college football rivalry

Furman–Wofford rivalry
- Furman Wofford
- Sport: College football
- First meeting: December 14, 1889; Wofford, 5–1
- Latest meeting: October 3, 2026; Wofford, 32–25
- Next meeting: 2027

Statistics
- Total meetings: 100
- All-time series: Furman, 56–37–7
- Largest victory: Furman, 69–0 (1920)
- Longest win streak: Furman, 19 (1917–1947)
- Longest unbeaten streak: Furman, 21 (1917–1950)
- Current win streak: Wofford, 4 (2023–present)

Campus locations of rivals Furman and Wofford

The Furman–Wofford football rivalry, sometimes referred to as the Deep South's Oldest Football Rivalry or the I-85 rivalry, is an American college football rivalry game played by the Furman Paladins football team of Furman University and the Wofford Terriers football team of Wofford College. The teams have played 99 times in total, dating back to first game in 1889. Furman currently leads the series with 56 wins, to Wofford's 37, with 7 ties.

== History ==
The series between Furman and Wofford dates back to December 14, 1889, in what was the first organized intercollegiate football game in South Carolina. In a game that contained no positions or uniforms and whose set of rules were decided upon right before its start, Wofford won 5–1. The series gets the occasional title of the "Deep South's Oldest Football Rivalry", as the 1889 meeting was also the first football game played in the Deep South, or the "State's Oldest Rivalry", due to its status as the oldest rivalry in South Carolina.

The teams have met in only two locations: Greenville and Spartanburg, South Carolina. The longest winning streak in the series's history lasted from 1917 to 1947, and consisted of nineteen consecutive Furman victories (during the first sixteen of which Wofford scored a total of fifteen points and was shut out twelve times).

The series has been interrupted multiple times. One such interruption took place from 1901 to 1914, when Wofford banned football for its violence. Major interruptions have also taken place from 1922–28, 1941–46 (due to World War II, neither school fielded a team from 1943–45), and 1980–93, with the exception of one game played in 1989. At present, the teams have met every year since 1995 with the exception of the 2021 FCS spring season when Wofford canceled their season before its completion due to COVID-19 infections and opt-outs.

== Geography ==
Furman and Wofford are located in Greenville and Spartanburg, respectively, less than 50 miles from each other. The rivalry's occasional title of the "I-85 Rivalry" is due to the proximity of both schools to Interstate 85, though this title is more often used for the schools' basketball rivalry, and is most commonly used to refer to the NFL rivalry between the Carolina Panthers and the Atlanta Falcons.

== Game results ==
| Furman victories | Wofford victories | Tie games |

| No. | Date | Location | Winner | Score |
|---|---|---|---|---|
| 1 | December 14, 1889 | Spartanburg | Wofford | 5–1 |
| 2 | January 18, 1890 | Greenville | Wofford | 2–1 |
| 3 | January 24, 1890 | Spartanburg | Furman | 12–0 |
| 4 | March 21, 1890 | Greenville | Furman | 28–2 |
| 5 | November 30, 1893 | Greenville | Furman | 18–4 |
| 6 | November 23, 1895 | Spartanburg | Wofford | 44–0 |
| 7 | November 6, 1896 | Spartanburg | Wofford | 6–0 |
| 8 | October 26, 1900 | Spartanburg | Tie | 0–0 |
| 9 | November 29, 1900 | Greenville | Wofford | 6–5 |
| 10 | November 28, 1901 | Greenville | Furman | 17–0 |
| 11 | October 10, 1914 | Greenville | Furman | 19–12 |
| 12 | November 25, 1915 | Greenville | Furman | 25–0 |
| 13 | November 30, 1916 | Spartanburg | Wofford | 9–7 |
| 14 | November 29, 1917 | Greenville | Furman | 18–3 |
| 15 | December 4, 1918 | Spartanburg | Furman | 7–0 |
| 16 | October 11, 1919 | Greenville | Furman | 7–6 |
| 17 | November 13, 1920 | Spartanburg | Furman | 69–0 |
| 18 | November 19, 1921 | Greenville | Furman | 62–0 |
| 19 | November 18, 1922 | Spartanburg | Furman | 41–0 |
| 20 | October 27, 1928 | Greenville | Furman | 26–0 |
| 21 | October 26, 1929 | Spartanburg | Furman | 25–6 |
| 22 | November 15, 1930 | Spartanburg | Furman | 14–0 |
| 23 | October 31, 1931 | Greenville | Furman | 20–0 |
| 24 | November 5, 1932 | Spartanburg | Furman | 24–0 |
| 25 | November 4, 1933 | Greenville | Furman | 38–0 |
| 26 | September 29, 1934 | Spartanburg | Furman | 13–0 |
| 27 | November 9, 1935 | Greenville | Furman | 29–0 |
| 28 | September 26, 1936 | Spartanburg | Furman | 31–0 |
| 29 | October 1, 1937 | Greenville | Furman | 58–0 |
| 30 | September 26, 1941 | Greenville | Furman | 40–19 |
| 31 | September 27, 1946 | Greenville | Furman | 31–0 |
| 32 | October 25, 1947 | Spartanburg | Furman | 20–6 |
| 33 | October 16, 1948 | Greenville | Tie | 7–7 |
| 34 | November 3, 1950 | Greenville | Tie | 13–13 |
| 35 | November 2, 1951 | Spartanburg | Wofford | 14–12 |
| 36 | November 1, 1952 | Greenville | Furman | 29–21 |
| 37 | October 31, 1953 | Spartanburg | Furman | 7–6 |
| 38 | November 20, 1954 | Greenville | Wofford | 19–0 |
| 39 | October 1, 1955 | Spartanburg | Wofford | 27–6 |
| 40 | October 13, 1956 | Greenville | Wofford | 18–6 |
| 41 | October 19, 1957 | Spartanburg | Wofford | 13–12 |
| 42 | October 18, 1958 | Greenville | Furman | 40–39 |
| 43 | November 7, 1959 | Spartanburg | Wofford | 6–3 |
| 44 | October 15, 1960 | Greenville | Furman | 41–26 |
| 45 | October 28, 1961 | Spartanburg | Furman | 12–7 |
| 46 | September 22, 1962 | Greenville | Furman | 34–21 |
| 47 | October 12, 1963 | Spartanburg | Furman | 21–19 |
| 48 | September 26, 1964 | Greenville | Wofford | 21–14 |
| 49 | October 9, 1965 | Spartanburg | Wofford | 35–13 |
| 50 | October 8, 1966 | Greenville | Tie | 15–15 |
| 51 | October 7, 1967 | Spartanburg | Furman | 21–20 |

| No. | Date | Location | Winner | Score |
|---|---|---|---|---|
| 52 | September 28, 1968 | Spartanburg | Wofford | 13–7 |
| 53 | November 28, 1968 | Greenville | Wofford | 21–7 |
| 54 | October 11, 1969 | Spartanburg | Wofford | 49–7 |
| 55 | November 29, 1969 | Greenville | Wofford | 31–21 |
| 56 | September 26, 1970 | Greenville | Wofford | 28–13 |
| 57 | September 25, 1971 | Spartanburg | Wofford | 27–0 |
| 58 | September 23, 1972 | Greenville | Furman | 24–7 |
| 59 | September 22, 1973 | Spartanburg | Furman | 21–19 |
| 60 | October 26, 1974 | Greenville | Furman | 21–10 |
| 61 | November 22, 1975 | Spartanburg | Tie | 14–14 |
| 62 | November 20, 1976 | Greenville | Furman | 56–14 |
| 63 | October 8, 1977 | Spartanburg | Wofford | 13–7 |
| 64 | October 9, 1978 | Greenville | Furman | 36–12 |
| 65 | October 6, 1979 | Spartanburg | Wofford | 27–17 |
| 66 | November 15, 1980 | Greenville | Tie | 14–14 |
| 67 | October 21, 1989 | Greenville | Furman | 42–7 |
| 68 | September 18, 1993 | Greenville | Tie | 14–14 |
| 69 | September 16, 1995 | Greenville | Furman | 38–0 |
| 70 | September 21, 1996 | Greenville | Furman | 33–3 |
| 71 | November 15, 1997 | Greenville | Furman | 28–7 |
| 72 | November 14, 1998 | Spartanburg | Wofford | 40–20 |
| 73 | November 13, 1999 | Greenville | Furman | 30–3 |
| 74 | November 11, 2000 | Spartanburg | Furman | 27–18 |
| 75 | November 10, 2001 | Greenville | Furman | 45–14 |
| 76 | November 16, 2002 | Spartanburg | Furman | 23–21 |
| 77 | November 15, 2003 | Greenville | Wofford | 7–6 |
| 78 | November 13, 2004 | Spartanburg | Furman | 31–24 |
| 79 | November 12, 2005 | Greenville | Furman | 34–21 |
| 80 | September 30, 2006 | Spartanburg | Furman | 35–21 |
| 81 | September 29, 2007 | Greenville | Wofford | 45–20 |
| 82 | November 22, 2008 | Spartanburg | Wofford | 35–10 |
| 83 | November 21, 2009 | Greenville | Furman | 58–21 |
| 84 | October 2, 2010 | Spartanburg | Wofford | 38–17 |
| 85 | October 22, 2011 | Greenville | Furman | 26–21 |
| 86 | October 6, 2012 | Spartanburg | Wofford | 20–14 |
| 87 | November 23, 2013 | Greenville | Furman | 27–14 |
| 88 | November 15, 2014 | Greenville | Furman | 31–14 |
| 89 | November 21, 2015 | Spartanburg | Wofford | 38–28 |
| 90 | November 5, 2016 | Greenville | Wofford | 34–27 |
| 91 | September 2, 2017 | Spartanburg | Wofford | 24–23 |
| 92 | December 2, 2017 (Note: Game played as part of the second round of the FCS Playoffs.) | Spartanburg | Wofford | 28–10 |
| 93 | October 13, 2018 | Greenville | Furman | 34–14 |
| 94 | November 16, 2019 | Spartanburg | Wofford | 24–7 |
| 95 | October 9, 2021 | Spartanburg | Furman | 42–20 |
| 96 | November 19, 2022 | Greenville | Furman | 63–28 |
| 97 | November 18, 2023 | Spartanburg | Wofford | 19–13 |
| 98 | November 9, 2024 | Greenville | Wofford | 19–13 |
| 99 | October 18, 2025 | Spartanburg | Wofford | 31–13 |
| 100 | October 3, 2026 | Greenville | Wofford | 32–25 |
Series: Furman leads 56–37–7

== Significant games ==
=== 1889: The first game ===
Wofford and Furman first met at the Encampment Grounds, located in Spartanburg, on December 14, 1889, in what was the first college football game played in the state of South Carolina. The game was officiated by Professor J.H. Marshall, under "the old rough-and-tumble" rugby-style rules, despite Wofford's wish to play by "association rules" that more closely resembled soccer. The game was "won with ease" by Wofford, 5 to 1.

=== 1948: Breaking the streak ===
1948: Wofford 7, Furman 7

| Team | 1 | 2 | 3 | 4 | Total |
|---|---|---|---|---|---|
| Wofford | 0 | 0 | 7 | 0 | 7 |
| Furman | 0 | 0 | 0 | 7 | 7 |

- Date: October 16, 1948
- Location: Greenville, SC

Coming into the 1948 game, Furman had won seventeen consecutive meetings between the teams. Under the leadership of Phil Dickens, Wofford entered the contest 0–0–3, en route to a national record five consecutive ties to begin the season, which they would go on to follow with four straight wins. The team was noted in the Bohemian, the Wofford yearbook, as being "strong and worthy" despite having "little material". Furman, under head coach Red Smith, entered 1–2, having just lost back-to-back games to South Carolina and Richmond. Remaining in a scoreless tie through halftime, the deadlock was broken by Wofford's "Slippery Sammy" Sewell, who scored on a long rush in the third quarter (Wofford claims it was 54 yards; Furman claims 47). According to the Bohemian, the game was tied again by Furman in the fourth quarter, on a "disputed fourth down play". The Furman account makes no mention of this play, only that the team was "sparked" on a 70-yard drive to tie the game and cause the Terriers to disappointedly "[withdraw] to their kennels" upon the conclusion of the game as a tie.

=== 1951: Ending the drought ===
1951: Wofford 14, Furman 12

| Team | 1 | 2 | 3 | 4 | Total |
|---|---|---|---|---|---|
| • Wofford | 14 | 0 | 0 | 0 | 14 |
| Furman | 0 | 6 | 0 | 6 | 12 |

- Date: November 2, 1951
- Location: Greenville, SC
- Game attendance: 7,500

Entering their 1951 meeting, it had been thirty-five years since Wofford had last beat Furman, a streak composed of nineteen losses and two ties. The Bohemian noted that Wofford's best win of the season came in their "muddy win" against the Hurricanes; (Note: Furman's football teams were referred to as the Hurricanes until 1963.) Wofford would go on to win the Little Four Conference championship. Furman's yearbook, the Bonhomie, referred to the game as 'the "Tear-jerker of the Year"'. Wofford struck first in the game, scoring twice in the first quarter and adding two conversions to take a 14–0 advantage into the second quarter; this ensured that the 1951 contest would be only the third time (1895 and 1941) that Wofford had scored fourteen points in a game against Furman. The Hurricanes responded, as Sonny Horton scored in the second quarter and Jim Piner added another touchdown in the fourth; however, Joe Watt failed to convert the point after following both scores. This resulted in the game finishing in favor of the Terriers, 14–12, for their first win against Furman since 1916.

Perhaps as a testament to the already-fierce rivalry between the teams, the two schools attribute the Wofford victory to different causes. The Bohemian mentions the "magnificent display of football" that was put on by the Terriers, and mentions that Wofford "doggedly [held] its advantage the rest of the way" after scoring all of their points in the first quarter of the contest. The Bonhomie, on the other hand, opens its account by noting that the "Wofford passing machine" was limited to "a mere two yards" and adds later that Wofford "[was] outplayed during the whole game".

=== 2017: First postseason meeting ===
2017: Wofford 28, Furman 10

| Team | 1 | 2 | 3 | 4 | Total |
|---|---|---|---|---|---|
| Furman | 0 | 10 | 0 | 0 | 10 |
| • Wofford | 7 | 7 | 7 | 7 | 28 |

- Date: December 2, 2017
- Location: Spartanburg, SC
- Game attendance: 5,153

After meeting to open the season on September 2, 2017, the Paladins and Terriers were treated to another matchup in the FCS playoffs. This was the first year since 1969 that the teams had played twice in the same season, and the first time ever they'd met in the postseason. Wofford entered the matchup 9–2, and as the No. 7 national seed, having received a first-round bye and home field advantage in the rivalry for the second time in a row. Furman entered the contest with a record of 8–4, after defeating Elon in the first round the week before.

Wofford's Blake Morgan opened the scoring nearly halfway through the first quarter on a short rush, though Furman took a 10–7 lead in the second quarter following a 41 yard field goal by Grayson Atkins and a 20 yard pass from P.J. Blazejowski to Logan McCarter. From there, Wofford finished the first half with a 33 yard passing touchdown, this one from Brandon Goodson to Blake Morgan, to take a 14–10 lead into halftime. Wofford extended their lead with one touchdown each in the third and fourth quarters; Chase Nelson found the end zone from 2 yards out with three minutes to play, and Miller Mosely scored on a similar rush with just under six minutes to play in the contest. This 28–10 lead held, and Wofford advanced to the FCS quarterfinals; there they faltered against fourth-ranked North Dakota State.

== See also ==
- List of NCAA college football rivalry games
- List of the first college football games in each U.S. state
- List of most-played college football series in NCAA Division I
