= Furman Paladins football =

Football team of Furman University

| 2026 Furman Paladins football team |
- First season: 1889; 137 years ago
- Athletic director: Jason Donnelly
- Head coach: Clay Hendrix; 10th season, 60–43 (.583)
- Location: Greenville, South Carolina
- Stadium: Paladin Stadium (capacity: 16,000)
- NCAA division: Division I FCS
- Conference: Southern
- Colors: Royal purple and white
- All-time record: 645–497–38 (.563)

NCAA Division I FCS championships
- 1988

Conference championships
- SoCon: 1978, 1980, 1981, 1982, 1983, 1985, 1988, 1989, 1990, 1999, 2001, 2004, 2013, 2018, 2023
- Rivalries: The Citadel (rivalry); Mercer; Samford; Western Carolina; Wofford (rivalry)
- Website: furmanpaladins.com

The Furman Paladins football program is the intercollegiate American football team for the Furman University located in the state of South Carolina. The team competes in the NCAA Division I Football Championship Subdivision (FCS) as members of the Southern Conference (SoCon). The school's first football team was fielded in 1889. The 1902 team won a state championship. The team plays its home games at the 16,000 seat Paladin Stadium in Greenville, South Carolina.

The 1988 Furman Paladins football team, coached by Jimmy Satterfield, won the NCAA Division I Football Championship. Clay Hendrix, who was a member of that championship team, has served as the team's head coach since 2017.

== History ==
=== Classifications ===
- 1937–1942: NCAA College Division
- 1946–1957: NCAA University Division
- 1958–1972: NCAA College Division
- 1973–1977: NCAA Division I
- 1978–1981: NCAA Division I–A
- 1982–present: NCAA Division I–AA/FCS

=== Conference memberships ===
- 1889–1896: Independent
- 1897–1899: No football team
- 1900–1901: Independent
- 1902: Southern Intercollegiate Athletic Association
- 1903–1912: No football team
- 1913–1914: Independent
- 1915–1929: Southern Intercollegiate Athletic Association
- 1930–1931: Independent
- 1932–1935: Southern Intercollegiate Athletic Association
- 1936–present: Southern Conference

== Championships ==
=== National championships ===
| Season | Coach | Selector | Record | Result | Opponent |
|---|---|---|---|---|---|
| 1988 | Jimmy Satterfield | NCAA Division I-AA | 13–2 | W 17–12 | Georgia Southern |

=== Conference championships ===
The Paladins have won 15 conference titles, all in the Southern Conference, with seven shared and eight outright.

| Year | Conference | Coach | Overall Record | Conference Record |
|---|---|---|---|---|
| 1978† | Southern Conference | Dick Sheridan | 8–3 | 4–1 |
| 1980 | Southern Conference | Dick Sheridan | 9–1–1 | 7–0 |
| 1981 | Southern Conference | Dick Sheridan | 8–3 | 5–2 |
| 1982 | Southern Conference | Dick Sheridan | 9–3 | 6–1 |
| 1983 | Southern Conference | Dick Sheridan | 10–2–1 | 6–0–1 |
| 1985 | Southern Conference | Dick Sheridan | 12–2 | 6–0 |
| 1988† | Southern Conference | Jimmy Satterfield | 13–2 | 6–1 |
| 1989 | Southern Conference | Jimmy Satterfield | 12–2 | 7–0 |
| 1990 | Southern Conference | Jimmy Satterfield | 9–4 | 6–1 |
| 1999† | Southern Conference | Bobby Johnson | 9–3 | 7–1 |
| 2001† | Southern Conference | Bobby Johnson | 12–3 | 7–1 |
| 2004† | Southern Conference | Bobby Lamb | 10–3 | 6–1 |
| 2013† | Southern Conference | Bruce Fowler | 8–6 | 6–2 |
| 2018† | Southern Conference | Clay Hendrix | 6–4 | 6–2 |
| 2023 | Southern Conference | Clay Hendrix | 10-3 | 7–1 |

== Postseason ==
=== NCAA Division I-AA/FCS playoffs ===
The Paladins have appeared in the NCAA Division I Football Championship playoffs 20 times with a record of 21–19. They were national champions in 1988 and runner-up in 1985 and 2001.

| Year | Round | Opponent | Result |
|---|---|---|---|
| 1982 | First Round | South Carolina State | L 0–17 |
| 1983 | Quarterfinals; Semifinals | Boston University; Western Carolina | W 35–16; L 7–14 |
| 1985 | Quarterfinals; Semifinals; National Championship Game | Rhode Island; Nevada; Georgia Southern | W 59–15; W 35–12; L 42–44 |
| 1986 | First Round | Eastern Kentucky | L 10–23 |
| 1988 | First Round; Quarterfinals; Semifinal; National Championship Game | Delaware; Marshall; Idaho; Georgia Southern | W 21–7; W 13–9; W 38–7; W 17–12 |
| 1989 | First Round; Quarterfinals; Semifinals | William & Mary; Youngstown State; Stephen F. Austin | W 24–10; W 42–23; L 19–21 |
| 1990 | First Round; Quarterfinals | Eastern Kentucky; Nevada | W 45–17; L 35–42 ^{3OT} |
| 1996 | First Round; Quarterfinals | Northern Arizona; Marshall | W 42–31; L 0–54 |
| 1999 | First Round | Massachusetts | L 23–30 ^{OT} |
| 2000 | First Round | Hofstra | L 24–31 |
| 2001 | First Round; Quarterfinals; Semifinals; National Championship Game | WKU; Lehigh; Georgia Southern; Montana | W 24–20; W 34–17; W 24–17; L 6–13 |
| 2002 | First Round | Villanova | L 38–45 |
| 2004 | First Round; Quarterfinals | Jacksonville State; James Madison | W 49–7; L 13–14 |
| 2005 | First Round; Quarterfinals; Semifinals | Nicholls State; Richmond; Appalachian State | W 14–12; W 24–20; L 23–29 |
| 2006 | First Round | Montana State | L 13–31 |
| 2013 | First Round; Second Round | South Carolina State; North Dakota State | W 30–20; L 7–38 |
| 2017 | First Round; Second Round | Elon; Wofford | W 28–27; L 10–28 |
| 2019 | First Round | Austin Peay | L 6–42 |
| 2022 | First Round; Second Round | Elon; Incarnate Word | W 31–6; L 38–41 |
| 2023 | Second Round; Quarterfinals | Chattanooga; Montana | W 26–7; L 28–35 ^{OT} |

== Furman vs. in-state NCAA Division I schools ==
| School | Record | Percentage | Streak | First meeting | Last meeting |
|---|---|---|---|---|---|
| Charleston Southern | 2–1 | .667 | Lost 1 | 2019 | 2024 |
| Clemson Tigers | 10–43–4 | .211 | Lost 31 | 1896 | 2018 |
| Coastal Carolina | 1–7 | .125 | Lost 6 | 2006 | 2016 |
| Presbyterian | 42–13–1 | .759 | Lost 1 | 1913 | 2014 |
| South Carolina | 20–28–1 | .418 | Lost 2 | 1892 | 2023 |
| South Carolina State | 12–5 | .706 | Won 1 | 1982 | 2015 |
| The Citadel | 64–37–3 | .630 | Won 4 | 1913 | 2024 |
| Wofford | 56–34–7 | .613 | Lost 1 | 1889 | 2023 |
Total: 199–165–16

== Notable former players ==
- Braniff Bonaventure
- Luther Broughton
- Ben Browder
- Sederrik Cunningham
- Dakota Dozier
- Jerome Felton
- Omari Hardwick
- Clay Hendrix
- Louis Ivory
- Stanford Jennings
- Bob King
- Bobby Lamb
- Ingle Martin
- William Middleton
- Billy Napier
- Bear Rinehart
- Orlando Ruff
- Terry Smith
- James H. "Speedy" Speer
- Ryan Steed
- David Whitehurst
- Sam Wyche

== Players in the NFL draft ==
=== Key ===
| B | Back | K | Kicker | NT | Nose tackle |
| C | Center | LB | Linebacker | FB | Fullback |
| DB | Defensive back | P | Punter | HB | Halfback |
| DE | Defensive end | QB | Quarterback | WR | Wide receiver |
| DT | Defensive tackle | RB | Running back | G | Guard |
| E | End | T | Offensive tackle | TE | Tight end |

| Year | Round | Pick in round | Overall pick | Player | Team | Position |
|---|---|---|---|---|---|---|
| 2014 | 4 | 37 | 137 | Dakota Dozier | Jets | T |
| 2009 | 5 | 2 | 138 | William Middleton | Falcons | DB |
| 2008 | 5 | 11 | 146 | Jerome Felton | Lions | RB |
| 2006 | 5 | 15 | 148 | Ingle Martin | Packers | QB |
| 2000 | 4 | 14 | 108 | John Keith | 49ers | DB |
| 2000 | 7 | 2 | 208 | Desmond Kitchings | Chiefs | WR |
| 1997 | 5 | 25 | 155 | Luther Broughton | Eagles | TE |
| 1986 | 4 | 8 | 90 | Charles Fox | Chiefs | WR |
| 1985 | 10 | 19 | 271 | Dennis Williams | Cardinals | RB |
| 1984 | 3 | 9 | 65 | Stanford Jennings | Bengals | RB |
| 1984 | 6 | 11 | 151 | Ernest Gibson | Patriots | DB |
| 1977 | 8 | 11 | 206 | David Whitehurst | Packers | QB |
| 1970 | 17 | 2 | 418 | Joe Brunson | Bears | DT |
| 1967 | 10 | 17 | 254 | Lavern Barrs | Cardinals | DB |
| 1963 | 7 | 11 | 95 | Olin Hill | Packers | T |
| 1962 | 11 | 8 | 148 | Larry Jepson | 49ers | C |
| 1962 | 15 | 9 | 205 | Joe Monte | Colts | G |
| 1957 | 24 | 8 | 285 | Bob Jennings | Redskins | C |
| 1957 | 30 | 9 | 358 | Mike Shill | Lions | T |
| 1956 | 22 | 7 | 260 | Johnny Popson | Packers | B |
| 1954 | 5 | 5 | 54 | Bob Griffis | Bears | G |
| 1953 | 29 | 9 | 346 | Bob Griffis | Giants | G |
| 1951 | 6 | 4 | 66 | Ed Jasonek | Cardinals | B |
| 1950 | 16 | 7 | 203 | Harry Bierman | Cardinals | E |
| 1950 | 29 | 2 | 367 | Ed Jasonek | Bulldogs | B |
| 1949 | 5 | 9 | 50 | Tom Wham | Cardinals | E |
| 1943 | 3 | 6 | 21 | Dewey Proctor | Giants | B |
| 1943 | 4 | 1 | 26 | Ralph Hamer | Lions | B |
| 1943 | 7 | 1 | 51 | Paul Sizemore | Lions | E |
| 1941 | 18 | 2 | 162 | Bill Cornwall | Steelers | T |
| 1940 | 3 | 4 | 19 | Rhoten Shetley | Dodgers | B |

== Future non-conference opponents ==
Announced schedules as of September 16, 2026.

| 2026 | 2027 | 2028 | 2029 | 2030 |
|---|---|---|---|---|
| Anderson | at South Carolina | at Florida | at Davidson | Davidson |
| at Tennessee | at South Carolina State | Campbell | at Clemson | |
| South Carolina State | Richmond | | | |
| at Richmond | | | | |
