= Brent Thompson (American football) =

American football coach

Current position
- Title: Offensive coordinator
- Team: VMI
- Conference: SoCon

Biographical details
- Born: c. 1975 (age 50–51)

Playing career
- 1994–1997: Norwich
- Position: Defensive back

Coaching career (HC unless noted)
- 1998–1999: Dickinson (assistant)
- 2000: Stony Brook (assistant)
- 2001–2002: Northeastern (assistant)
- 2003–2009: Bucknell (assistant)
- 2010–2013: Lenoir–Rhyne (OC)
- 2014–2015: The Citadel (OC)
- 2016–2022: The Citadel
- 2026–present: VMI (OC)

Administrative career (AD unless noted)
- 2023–2025: East Carolina (Director of Recruiting Operations)

Head coaching record
- Overall: 36–44
- Tournaments: 0–1 (NCAA D-I playoffs)

Accomplishments and honors

Championships
- 1 SoCon (2016)

Awards
- SoCon Coach of the Year (2016)

Brent Thompson is an American college football coach who currently serves as the offensive coordinator for the VMI Keydets.

He served as head coach of The Citadel Bulldogs football team from 2016 to 2022. The Citadel and Thompson parted ways following back to back 4–7 seasons in 2021 and 2022.

== Head coaching record ==
Year	Team	Overall	Conference	Standing	Bowl/playoffs	STATS^{#}	Coaches^{°}
The Citadel Bulldogs (Southern Conference) (2016–2022)
2016	The Citadel	10–2	8–0	1st	L NCAA Division I Second Round	10	9
2017	The Citadel	5–6	3–5	T–6th			
2018	The Citadel	5–6	4–4	T–5th			
2019	The Citadel	6–6	4–4	T–4th			
2020–21	The Citadel	2–10	2–6	7th			
2021	The Citadel	4–7	3–5	T–7th			
2022	The Citadel	4–7	3–5	T–6th			
The Citadel:		36–44	27–29				
Total:		36–44					
National championship Conference title Conference division title or championship game berth
