= 2017 Western Carolina Catamounts football team =

American college football season

2017 Western Carolina Catamounts football
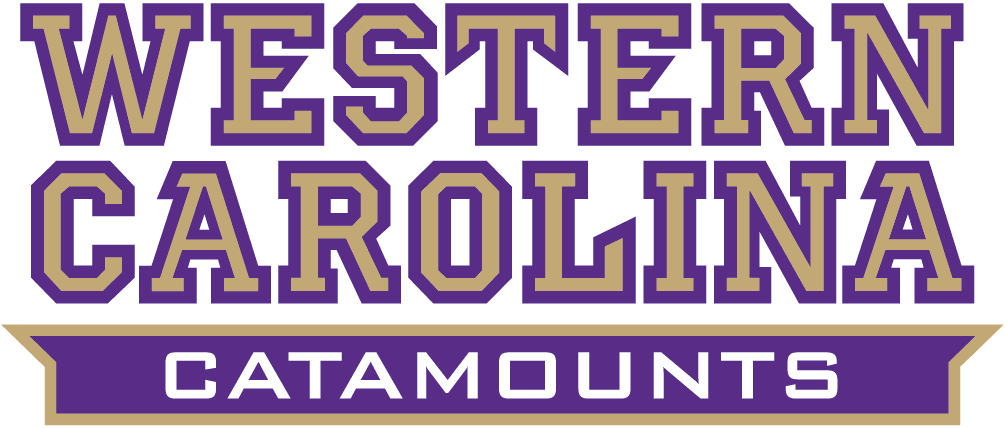
- Conference: Southern Conference
- Record: 7–5 (5–3 SoCon)
- Head coach: Mark Speir (6th season)
- Offensive coordinator: Brad Glenn (6th season)
- Offensive scheme: Spread
- Defensive coordinator: John Wiley (1st season)
- Base defense: 3–4
- Home stadium: Bob Waters Field at E. J. Whitmire Stadium

2017 Southern Conference football standings
	Conf.			Overall
Team	W		L	W		L
No. 6 Wofford $^	7	–	1	10	–	3
No. 18 Samford ^	6	–	2	8	–	4
No. 19 Furman ^	6	–	2	8	–	5
Western Carolina	5	–	3	7	–	5
Mercer	4	–	4	5	–	6
The Citadel	3	–	5	5	–	6
Chattanooga	3	–	5	3	–	8
East Tennessee State	2	–	6	4	–	7
VMI	0	–	8	0	–	11
$ – Conference champion; ^ – FCS playoff participant; Rankings from STATS Poll

The 2017 Western Carolina Catamounts team represented Western Carolina University as a member of the Southern Conference (SoCon) during the 2017 NCAA Division I FCS football season. Led by sixth-year head coach Mark Speir, the Catamounts compiled an overall record of 7–5 with a mark of 5–3 in conference play, placing fourth in the SoCon. Western Carolina played home games at Bob Waters Field at E. J. Whitmire Stadium in Cullowhee, North Carolina.

== Schedule ==
Date	Time	Opponent	Rank	Site	TV	Result	Attendance
September 2	12:00 a.m.	at Hawaii*		Aloha Stadium; Honolulu, HI	SPEC	L 18–41	25,472
September 9	6:00 p.m.	Davidson*		Bob Waters Field at E. J. Whitmire Stadium; Cullowhee, NC	ESPN3	W 63–17	11,763
September 16	6:00 p.m.	at Gardner–Webb*		Ernest W. Spangler Stadium; Boiling Springs, NC	WMYA	W 42–27	6,152
September 23	3:30 p.m.	No. 18 Samford		Bob Waters Field at E. J. Whitmire Stadium; Cullowhee, NC	ESPN3	W 38–34	12,018
September 30	6:00 p.m.	at Chattanooga		Finley Stadium; Chattanooga, TN	ESPN3	W 45–7	10,101
October 7	1:30 p.m.	at No. 5 Wofford	No. 22	Gibbs Stadium; Spartanburg, SC	ESPN3	L 28–35 ^{OT}	6,982
October 14	3:30 p.m.	East Tennessee State	No. 21	Bob Waters Field at E. J. Whitmire Stadium; Cullowhee, NC	ESPN3	W 49–10	8,300
October 21	1:30 p.m.	at VMI	No. 19	Alumni Memorial Field; Lexington, VA	ESPN3	W 26–7	4,119
October 28	3:30 p.m.	Furman^{†}	No. 18	Bob Waters Field at E. J. Whitmire Stadium; Cullowhee, NC	ESPN3	L 6–28	9,973
November 4	2:00 p.m.	at The Citadel	No. 24	Johnson Hagood Stadium; Charleston, SC	ESPN3	W 31–19	7,384
November 11	2:00 p.m.	Mercer	No. 22	Bob Waters Field at E. J. Whitmire Stadium; Cullowhee, NC	ESPN3	L 33–35	10,681
November 18	3:00 p.m.	at North Carolina*		Kenan Memorial Stadium; Chapel Hill, NC	ACCN Extra	L 10–65	43,000
*Non-conference game; ^{†}Homecoming; Rankings from STATS Poll released prior to the game; All times are in Eastern time

== Game summaries ==
=== At Hawaii ===
	1	2	3	4	Total
Catamounts	0	10	8	0	18
Rainbow Warriors	7	14	13	7	41

=== Davidson ===
	1	2	3	4	Total
Wildcats	0	14	0	3	17
Catamounts	28	21	7	7	63

=== At Gardner–Webb ===
	1	2	3	4	Total
Catamounts	7	14	14	7	42
Runnin' Bulldogs	0	13	0	14	27

=== Samford ===
	1	2	3	4	Total
No. 18 Bulldogs	7	7	13	7	34
Catamounts	10	7	7	14	38

=== At Chattanooga ===
	1	2	3	4	Total
Catamounts	10	14	14	7	45
Mocs	0	0	0	7	7

=== At Wofford ===
	1	2	3	4	OT	Total
No. 22 Catamounts	7	7	7	7	0	28
No. 5 Terriers	3	10	8	7	7	35

=== East Tennessee State ===
	1	2	3	4	Total
Buccaneers	3	0	0	7	10
No. 21 Catamounts	0	7	21	21	49

=== At VMI ===
	1	2	3	4	Total
No. 19 Catamounts	0	13	3	10	26
Keydets	7	0	0	0	7

=== Furman ===
	1	2	3	4	Total
Paladins	0	7	14	7	28
No. 18 Catamounts	0	0	0	6	6

=== At The Citadel ===
	1	2	3	4	Total
No. 24 Catamounts	7	10	7	7	31
Bulldogs	0	10	9	0	19

=== Mercer ===
	1	2	3	4	Total
Bears	14	14	0	7	35
Catamounts	7	13	3	10	33

=== At North Carolina ===
	1	2	3	4	Total
Catamounts	7	0	0	3	10
Tar Heels	7	35	10	13	65

== Ranking movements ==
Ranking movements Legend: ██ Increase in ranking ██ Decrease in ranking — = Not ranked RV = Received votes
	Week													
Poll	Pre	1	2	3	4	5	6	7	8	9	10	11	12	Final
STATS FCS	—	RV	RV	RV	RV	22	21	19	18	24	22	RV	RV	RV
Coaches	—	—	—	—	RV	RV	25	21	20	RV	25	RV	RV	RV
