= Clay Hendrix =

American football player and coach (born 1963)

Current position
- Title: Head coach
- Team: Furman
- Conference: SoCon
- Record: 60–43

Biographical details
- Born: July 16, 1963 (age 63); Commerce, Georgia, U.S.

Playing career
- 1982–1985: Furman
- Position: Offensive lineman

Coaching career (HC unless noted)
- 1986–1987: NC State (GA)
- 1988–2000: Furman (OL)
- 2001–2007: Furman (AHC/OL)
- 2007–2009: Air Force (co-OC/OL)
- 2010–2013: Air Force (co-OC/AHC/OL)
- 2014–2016: Air Force (AHC/OL)
- 2017–present: Furman

Head coaching record
- Overall: 60–43
- Tournaments: 3–4 (NCAA D-I playoffs)

Accomplishments and honors

Championships
- 2 SoCon (2018, 2023)

Awards
- 2x SoCon Coach of the Year (2017, 2023)

Clay Hendrix (born July 16, 1963) is an American football coach and former player. He is the head football coach at Furman University, a position he assumed in December 2016. Known for his extremely disciplined offensive lines, Clay notably served as offensive line coach and offensive coordinator at the United States Air Force Academy, helping lead them to four Commander-in-Chief Titles, nine bowl games, and the 2015 Mountain West Championship Game. In all, Hendrix has coached and mentored over 200+ student-athletes and military officers who went on to numerous professional ranks.

== Head coaching record ==
Year	Team	Overall	Conference	Standing	Bowl/playoffs	STATS^{#}	Coaches^{°}
Furman Paladins (Southern Conference) (2017–present)
2017	Furman	8–5	6–2	T–2nd	L NCAA Division I Second Round	22	25
2018	Furman	6–4	6–2	T–1st			
2019	Furman	8–5	6–2	2nd	L NCAA Division I First Round	21	19
2020–21	Furman	3–4	3–4	6th			
2021	Furman	6–5	4–4	T–4th			
2022	Furman	10–3	7–1	2nd	L NCAA Division I Second Round	10	10
2023	Furman	10–3	7–1	1st	L NCAA Division I Quarterfinal	7	6
2024	Furman	3–8	2–5	8th			
2025	Furman	6–6	4–4	T–5th			
Furman:		60–43	45–25				
Total:		60-43					
National championship Conference title Conference division title or championship game berth
