= Mark Speir =

American football coach (born 1968)

Current position
- Title: Assistant head coach
- Team: Cincinnati
- Conference: Big 12

Biographical details
- Born: April 28, 1968 (age 58); Kannapolis, North Carolina, U.S.
- Education: Clemson, B.A. (1990)

Coaching career (HC unless noted)
- 1991–1993: Western Carolina (RB)
- 1994: Western Carolina (OLB)
- 1995–1996: Western Carolina (DL)
- 1997–1999: Presbyterian (DL)
- 2000–2001: Elon (ST/RB)
- 2002: Elon (DL)
- 2003–2004: Appalachian State (RB)
- 2005–2009: Appalachian State (DL)
- 2009–2010: Appalachian State (DE)
- 2011: Appalachian State (ILB)
- 2012–2020: Western Carolina
- 2021: Appalachian State (senior Analyst)
- 2022: Louisville (chief of staff)
- 2023: Cincinnati (chief of staff)
- 2024–2025: Appalachian State (senior assistant)
- 2026–present: Cincinnati (assistant HC)

Head coaching record
- Overall: 33–68

Accomplishments and honors

Awards
- AFCA Division I FCS Assistant Coach of the Year Award (2009)

Mark Speir (born April 28, 1968) is an American football coach. He currently serves as the assistant head coach at Cincinnati. Prior to this, he was a senior assistant to the head coach at Appalachian State University. Speir has also served as the head football coach at Western Carolina University from 2012 to 2021, compiling a record of 33–68. Speir previously served as an assistant coach at Western Carolina, Presbyterian College, Elon University, University of Louisville, and the University of Cincinnati.

== Coaching career ==
Speir started his coaching career while an undergraduate at Clemson, working as a student assistant from 1986 to 1989. He then spent six seasons on Steve Hodgin's staff at Western Carolina, coaching running backs from 1991 to 1993, linebackers in 1994, and the defensive line in 1995 and 1996 while also serving as recruiting coordinator. Speir moved to then-NCAA Division II Presbyterian in 1997, serving on Daryl Dickey's staff through the 1999 season. In 2000, he was hired to Al Seagraves' staff at Elon, where he served until 2002. In 2003, Speir was hired to Jerry Moore's staff at Appalachian State to serve as recruiting coordinator and to coach running backs. From 2005 to 2009, Speir coached the defensive line, and coach defensive ends and inside linebackers in 2010 and 2011, respectively. Speir was on the staff that won three consecutive national championships in 2005, 2006, and 2007. In 2009, Speir was named NCAA Division I FCS Assistant Coach of the Year by the AFCA.

=== Western Carolina ===
On December 22, 2011, Speir was named head coach at Western Carolina, replacing the outgoing Dennis Wagner. Speir opened his first season as head coach with a 42–14 win over Mars Hill, and finished his first season with a record of 1–10. Following a 2–10 season in 2013, Speir led the Catamounts to a 7–5 record in 2014, their first winning season since 2001. Spier was granted a four-year extension following the 2014 season. He followed up this success with a 7–4 record in 2015, just missing the FCS playoffs. After a disappointing 2–9 record in 2016, Speir rebounded in 2017 with a 7–5 record. After 3–8, 3–9, and 1–8 seasons in 2018, 2019, and 2020–21, Speir was let go as head coach on April 9, 2021. He finished with a 33–68 record at Western Carolina.

During his tenure at Western Carolina, four players under Speir signed National Football League (NFL) contracts: Keion Crossen, Detrez Newsome, Ian Berryman, and John Brannon. Speir also coached two record-setting Catamount quarterbacks, Troy Mitchell and Tyrie Adams.

== Head coaching record ==
Year	Team	Overall	Conference	Standing	Bowl/playoffs
Western Carolina Catamounts (Southern Conference) (2012–2021)
2012	Western Carolina	1–10	0–8	9th	
2013	Western Carolina	2–10	1–7	T–8th	
2014	Western Carolina	7–5	5–2	T–2nd	
2015	Western Carolina	7–4	5–2	3rd	
2016	Western Carolina	2–9	1–7	T–8th	
2017	Western Carolina	7–5	5–3	4th	
2018	Western Carolina	3–8	1–7	8th	
2019	Western Carolina	3–9	2–6	8th	
2020–21	Western Carolina	1–8	1–5	9th	
Western Carolina:		33–68	21–47		
Total:		33–68			
