= William B. Greene Jr. Stadium =

Football stadium at East Tennessee State University

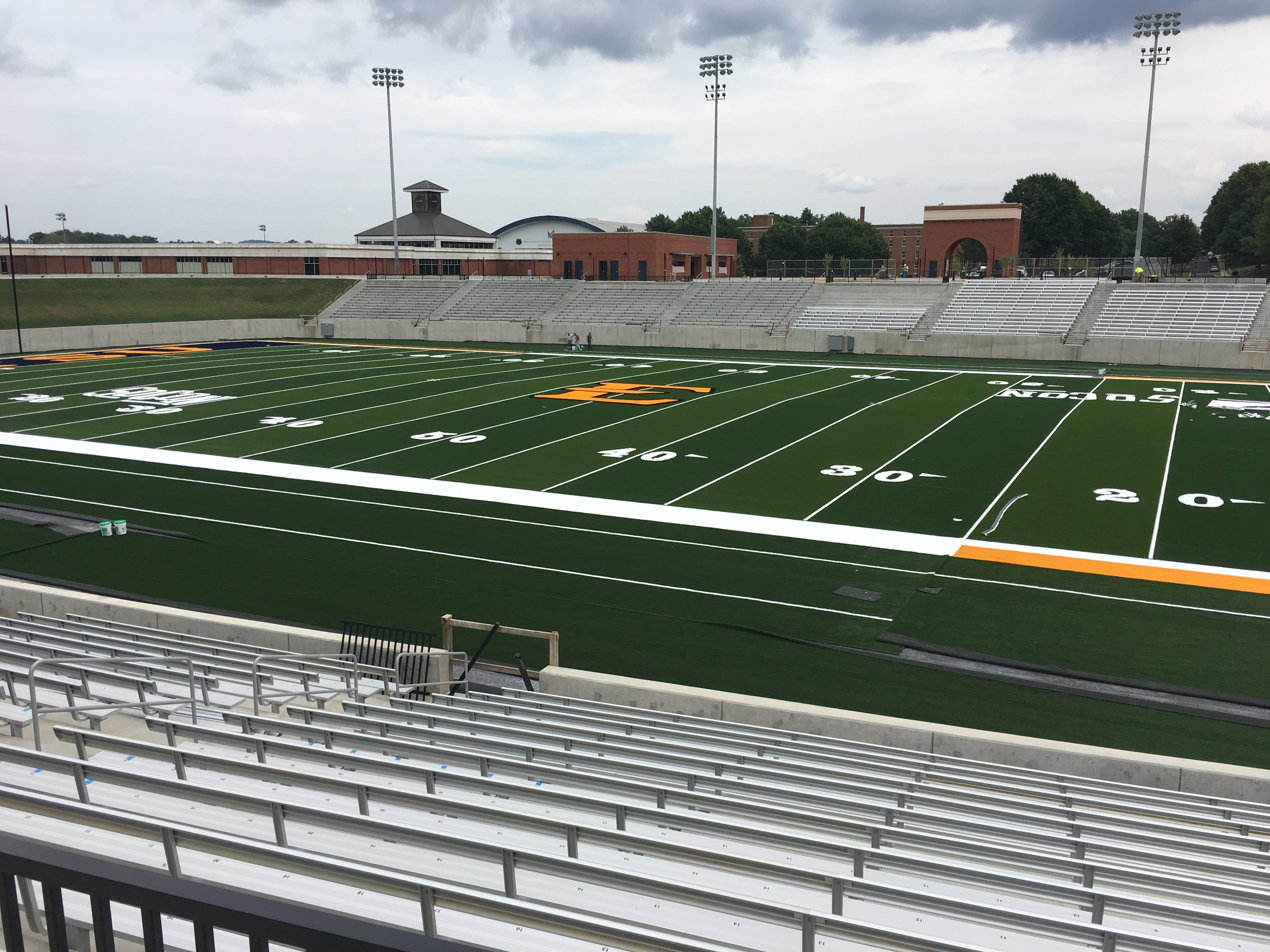
- The stadium in 2017
- Interactive map of William B. Greene Jr. Stadium
- Address: 1300 Jack Vest Drive; Johnson City, TN; United States
- Coordinates: 36.299°N 82.374°W
- Owner: ETSU
- Operator: ETSU Athletics
- Capacity: 7,694
- Type: Stadium
- Surface: Artificial turf
- Record attendance: 12,109(November 9, 2024)
- Current use: Football

Construction
- Groundbreaking: November 16, 2015
- Opened: September 2, 2017; 8 years ago
- Cost: US$26.615 million
- Architects: McCarty Holsaple McCarty, Inc. John Fisher Architect
- Structural engineers: John L. Jacobs & Associates
- Services engineers: Facilities Systems Consultants, LLC
- General contractor: BurWil Construction Co.

Tenants
- East Tennessee State Buccaneers (NCAA): football

Website
- etsubucs.com/greene-stadium/

William B. Greene Jr. Stadium is a football stadium on the campus of East Tennessee State University (ETSU) in Johnson City, Tennessee.

Located on the southwestern corner of campus at the foot of Buffalo Mountain, the new stadium is expected to have a seated capacity of over 7,000, plus standing room for an additional 3,000, and cost roughly $26.615 million. The stadium is home to the newly resumed East Tennessee State Buccaneers football team, which played their 2015 and 2016 seasons at Kermit Tipton Stadium on the campus of Science Hill High School.

The stadium is named after businessman and longtime ETSU supporter William B. Greene Jr., founder of the Bank of Tennessee.

== Team success ==
Through the 2022 season, the East Tennessee State Buccaneers have posted a 21–7 record at home.

== See also ==
- List of NCAA Division I FCS football stadiums
