= 2017 Portland State Vikings football team =

American college football season

2017 Portland State Vikings football
- Conference: Big Sky Conference
- Record: 0–11 (0–8 Big Sky)
- Head coach: Bruce Barnum (3rd season)
- Offensive coordinator: Steve Cooper (3rd season)
- Offensive scheme: Pistol
- Defensive coordinator: Malik Roberson (3rd season)
- Base defense: 3–3–5
- Home stadium: Providence Park

2017 Big Sky Conference football standings
	Conf.			Overall
Team	W		L	W		L
No. 14 Southern Utah +^	7	–	1	9	–	3
No. 5 Weber State +^	7	–	1	11	–	3
Northern Arizona ^	6	–	2	7	–	5
No. 21 Eastern Washington	6	–	2	7	–	4
Sacramento State	6	–	2	7	–	4
Montana	5	–	3	7	–	4
Montana State	5	–	3	5	–	6
UC Davis	3	–	5	5	–	6
Idaho State	2	–	6	4	–	7
Northern Colorado	2	–	6	3	–	7
North Dakota	2	–	6	3	–	8
Cal Poly	1	–	7	1	–	10
Portland State	0	–	8	0	–	11
$ – Conference champion; ^ – FCS playoff participant; Rankings from STATS Poll

The 2017 Portland State Vikings football team represented Portland State University during the 2017 NCAA Division I FCS football season. They were led by third-year head coach Bruce Barnum and played their home games at Providence Park, with one home game at Hillsboro Stadium. They were a member of the Big Sky Conference. They finished the season 0–11, 0–8 in Big Sky play to finish in last place.

The Vikings scored a total of 256 points (23.4 points per game) and allowed 473 points (43 points per game). Offensive coordinator Steve Morton and defensive coordinator Malik Roberson were fired following the conclusion of the season.

== Schedule ==
Date	Time	Opponent	Site	TV	Result	Attendance
August 26	Noon	at BYU*	LaVell Edwards Stadium; Provo, UT	ESPN	L 6–20	55,427
September 2	11:00 a.m.	at Oregon State*	Reser Stadium; Corvallis, OR	P12N	L 32–35	34,737
September 16	2:00 p.m.	UC Davis*	Providence Park; Portland, OR	ELVN	L 14–37	4,442
September 30	2:00 p.m.	Montana	Hillsboro Stadium; Hillsboro, Oregon	Pluto TV	L 33–45	5,012
October 7	10:00 a.m.	at Montana State	Bobcat Stadium; Bozeman, MT	RTNW	L 22–30	18,987
October 14	2:00 p.m.	Northern Arizona	Providence Park; Portland, OR	Pluto TV	L 20–42	4,430
October 21	1:30 p.m.	at Idaho State	Holt Arena; Pocatello, ID	Pluto TV	L 30–59	5,942
October 28	4:00 p.m.	North Dakota	Providence Park; Portland, OR	ELVN	L 21–48	3,002
November 4	6:05 p.m.	at Cal Poly	Alex G. Spanos Stadium; San Luis Obispo, CA	Pluto TV	L 28–35	5,393
November 11	2:00 p.m.	No. 14 Weber State	Providence Park; Portland, OR	Pluto TV	L 17–63	3,792
November 18	3:00 p.m.	at No. 18 Eastern Washington	Roos Field; Cheney, WA (The Dam Cup)	RTNW	L 33–59	8,717
*Non-conference game; Rankings from STATS Poll released prior to the game; All times are in Pacific time

Despite also being a member of the Big Sky Conference, the game with UC Davis on September 16 is considered a non-conference game.

== Game summaries ==
=== At BYU ===
Portland State Vikings at BYU Cougars – Game summary

Quarter	1	2	3	4	Total
Vikings	0	6	0	0	6
Cougars	7	7	0	6	20

at LaVell Edwards Stadium, Provo, Utah

- Date: August 26
- Game time: 12:00 p.m. PDT/1:00 p.m. MDT
- Game weather: Sunny, 94 °F (34 °C)
- Game attendance: 55,427
- Referee: Brandon Cruse
- TV announcers (ESPN): Mark Neely, Trevor Matich, and Kris Budden
- Box score, Recap

Game information
First quarter
- BYU – Neil Pau'u 28-yard pass from Tanner Mangum (Rhett Almond kick), 2:01. Cougars 7–0. Drive: 4 plays, 64 yards, 1:19.

Second quarter

- BYU – Squally Canada 1-yard run (Rhett Almond kick), 7:57. Cougars 14–0. Drive: 8 plays, 66 yards, 3:25.
- PRST – Darnell Adams 4-yard pass from Jalani Eason (kick failed), 1:54. Cougars 14–6. Drive: 17 plays, 87 yards, 6:03.

Third quarter

- No scoring plays

Fourth quarter

- BYU – Rhett Almond 27-yard field goal, 13:22. Cougars 17–6. Drive: 13 plays, 83 yards, 6:02.
- BYU – Rhett Almond 35-yard field goal, 2:09. Cougars 20–6. Drive: 4 plays, 5 yards, 1:33.

Statistics	PRST	BYU
First downs	14	13
Total yards	220	365
Rushing yards	86	171
Passing yards	134	194
Turnovers	1	0
Time of possession	30:21	29:39

Team	Category	Player	Statistics
Portland State	Passing	Jalani Eason	16/36, 134 yards, TD, INT
Portland State	Rushing	Za'Quan Summers	20 rushes, 55 yards
Portland State	Receiving	Charlie Taumoepeau	6 receptions, 73 yards
BYU	Passing	Tanner Mangum	16/27, 194 yards, TD
BYU	Rushing	Squally Canada	16 rushes, 98 yards, TD
BYU	Receiving	Matt Bushman	3 receptions, 56 yards

=== At Oregon State ===
Portland State Vikings at Oregon State Beavers – Game summary

Quarter	1	2	3	4	Total
Vikings	6	0	20	6	32
Beavers	7	7	14	7	35

at Reser Stadium, Corvallis, Oregon

- Date: September 2
- Game time: 11:00 a.m. PDT
- Game weather: Sunny, 80 °F (27 °C)
- Game attendance: 34,737
- Referee: Land Clark
- TV: P12N
- Box score, Recap

Game information
First quarter
- PRST – Josh Kraght 42-yard pass from Jalani Eason (kick failed), 13:51. Vikings 6–0. Drive: 3 plays, 79 yards, 1:09.
- ORST – Ryan Nall 1-yard run (Jordan Choukair kick), 7:38. Beavers 7–6. Drive: 13 plays, 81 yards, 6:08.

Second quarter

- ORST – Darrell Garretson 4-yard run (Jordan Choukair kick), 1:34. Beavers 14–6. Drive: 8 plays, 98 yards, 3:35.

Third quarter

- PRST – Jalani Eason 5-yard run (kick blocked), 8:35. Beavers 14–12. Drive: 10 plays, 64 yards, 4:37.
- PRST – Jalani Eason 12-yard run (Za'Quan Summers run), 7:04. Vikings 20–14. Drive: 1 play, 12 yards, 0:09.
- ORST – Trevorris Johnson 3-yard run (Jordan Choukair kick), 6:32. Beavers 21–20. Drive: 2 plays, 51 yards, 0:22.
- ORST – Manase Hungalu 21-yard interception return (Jordan Choukair kick), 5:03. Beavers 28–20.
- PRST – Josh Kraght 37-yard pass from Jalani Eason (run failed), 0:12. Beavers 28–26. Drive: 9 plays, 82 yards, 4:46.

Fourth quarter

- PRST – Josh Kraght 1-yard run (pass failed), 2:43. Vikings 32–28. Drive: 9 plays, 67 yards, 4:05.
- ORST – Isaiah Hodgins 17-yard pass from Jake Luton (Jordan Choukair kick), 1:08. Beavers 35–32. Drive: 7 plays, 77 yards, 1:30.

Statistics	PRST	ORST
First downs	28	18
Total yards	515	389
Rushing yards	291	154
Passing yards	224	235
Turnovers	3	2
Time of possession	36:22	23:38

Team	Category	Player	Statistics
Portland State	Passing	Jalani Eason	11/18, 164 yards, 2 TD, 2 INT
Portland State	Rushing	Za'Quan Summers	18 rushes, 106 yards
Portland State	Receiving	Josh Kraght	3 receptions, 82 yards, 2 TD
Oregon State	Passing	Jake Luton	18/25, 235 yards, TD, INT
Oregon State	Rushing	Ryan Nall	16 rushes, 59 yards, TD
Oregon State	Receiving	Noah Togiai	5 receptions, 95 yards

=== UC Davis ===
UC Davis Aggies at Portland State Vikings – Game summary

Quarter	1	2	3	4	Total
Aggies	10	7	6	14	37
Vikings	0	0	7	7	14

at Providence Park, Portland, Oregon

- Date: September 16
- Game time: 2:00 p.m. PDT
- Game weather: Cloudy and smoky, 74 °F (23 °C)
- Game attendance: 4,442
- Referee: Kelly Holman
- TV: ELVN
- Box score, Recap

Game information
First quarter
- UCD – Max O'Rourke 22-yard field goal, 9:58. Aggies 3–0. Drive: 17 plays, 88 yards, 5:02.
- UCD – Darryl Graham 9-yard blocked punt return (Max O'Rourke kick), 1:44. Aggies 10–0.

Second quarter

- UCD – Aaron Moore 30-yard pass from Jake Maier (Max O'Rourke kick), 3:36. Aggies 17–0. Drive: 3 plays, 49 yards, 1:00.

Third quarter

- PRST – Darnell Adams 8-yard pass from Jalani Eason (Graycen Kennedy kick), 10:35. Aggies 17–7. Drive: 11 plays, 65 yards, 4:25.
- UCD – Ethan Hicks 2-yard pass from Jake Maier (kick failed), 0:30. Aggies 23–7. Drive: 6 plays, 15 yards, 2:01.

Fourth quarter

- UCD – Keelan Doss 12-yard pass from Jake Maier (Max O'Rourke kick), 11:33. Aggies 30–7. Drive: 5 plays, 70 yards, 2:00.
- UCD – C. J. Spencer 2-yard run (Max O'Rourke kick), 3:43. Aggies 37–7. Drive: 5 plays, 27 yards, 1:56.
- PRST – Darnell Adams 10-yard pass from Jalani Eason (Graycen Kennedy kick), 0:55. Aggies 37–14. Drive: 9 plays, 72 yards, 2:40.

Statistics	UCD	PRST
First downs	23	18
Total yards	490	361
Rushing yards	174	246
Passing yards	316	115
Turnovers	0	1
Time of possession	30:00	30:00

Team	Category	Player	Statistics
UC Davis	Passing	Jake Maier	24/32, 316 yards, 3 TD
UC Davis	Rushing	Mitchell Layton	8 rushes, 38 yards
UC Davis	Receiving	Wesley Preece	4 receptions, 84 yards
Portland State	Passing	Jalani Eason	11/27, 99 yards, 2 TD
Portland State	Rushing	Jason Talley	14 rushes, 77 yards
Portland State	Receiving	Darnell Adams	3 receptions, 47 yards, 2 TD

=== Montana ===
Montana Grizzlies at Portland State Vikings – Game summary

Quarter	1	2	3	4	Total
Grizzlies	10	17	13	5	45
Vikings	7	7	7	12	33

at Hillsboro Stadium, Hillsboro, Oregon

- Date: September 30
- Game time: 2:00 p.m. PDT
- Game weather: Partly cloudy, 62 °F (17 °C)
- Game attendance: 5,012
- Referee: Bruce Bondi
- TV: Pluto TV
- Box score, Recap

Game information
First quarter
- MONT – Jeremy Calhoun 2-yard run (Brandon Purdy kick), 12:35. Grizzlies 7–0. Drive: 8 plays, 39 yards, 2:05.
- PRST – Jason Talley 7-yard run (Graycen Kennedy kick), 7:40. Tied 7–7. Drive: 13 plays, 90 yards, 4:50.
- MONT – Brandon Purdy 34-yard field goal, 4:36. Grizzlies 10–7. Drive: 10 plays, 41 yards, 3:04.

Second quarter

- MONT – Brandon Purdy 33-yard field goal, 12:47. Grizzlies 13–7. Drive: 13 plays, 64 yards, 3:08.
- MONT – Makena Simis 2-yard run (Brandon Purdy kick), 8:41. Grizzlies 20–7. Drive: 7 plays, 73 yards, 2:34.
- PRST – Josh Kraght 47-yard run (Graycen Kennedy kick), 7:08. Grizzlies 20–14. Drive: 6 plays, 83 yards, 1:28.
- MONT – Jeremy Calhoun 2-yard run (Brandon Purdy kick), 1:02. Grizzlies 27–14. Drive: 8 plays, 66 yards, 2:42.

Third quarter

- PRST – Za'Quan Summers 28-yard run (Graycen Kennedy kick), 10:16. Grizzlies 27–21. Drive: 8 plays, 66 yards, 3:22.
- MONT – Keenan Curran 60-yard pass from Gresch Jensen (Brandon Purdy kick), 8:41. Grizzlies 34–21. Drive: 5 plays, 83 yards, 1:30.

Fourth quarter

- MONT – Brandon Purdy 22-yard field goal, 14:21. Grizzlies 37–21. Drive: 5 plays, 22 yards, 1:24.
- PRST – Khalil Dawson 87-yard kickoff return (pass failed), 14:08. Grizzlies 37–27.
- MONT – Justin Strong 64-yard interception return (kick failed), 3:15. Grizzlies 43–27.
- PRST – Trent Riley 25-yard pass from Josh Kraght (pass failed), 1:09. Grizzlies 43–33. Drive: 10 plays, 69 yards, 2:05.
- MONT – Connor Straham defensive PAT conversion, 1:09. Grizzlies 45–33.

Statistics	MONT	PRST
First downs	26	30
Total yards	454	544
Rushing yards	170	295
Passing yards	284	249
Turnovers	2	3
Time of possession	30:46	29:14

Team	Category	Player	Statistics
Montana	Passing	Gresch Jensen	23/38, 284 yards, TD, 2 INT
Montana	Rushing	Jeremy Calhoun	22 rushes, 124 yards, 2 TD
Montana	Receiving	Keenan Curran	2 receptions, 92 yards, TD
Portland State	Passing	Josh Kraght	18/42, 249 yards, TD, 3 INT
Portland State	Rushing	Josh Kraght	12 rushes, 132 yards, TD
Portland State	Receiving	Darnell Adams	9 receptions, 115 yards

=== At Montana State ===
Portland State Vikings at Montana State Bobcats – Game summary

Quarter	1	2	3	4	Total
Vikings	0	7	7	8	22
Bobcats	7	3	13	7	30

at Bobcat Stadium, Bozeman, Montana

- Date: October 7
- Game time: 10:00 a.m. PDT/11:00 a.m. MDT
- Game weather: Sunny and windy, 63 °F (17 °C)
- Game attendance: 18,987
- Referee: Greg Wilson
- TV: RTNW
- Box score, Recap

Game information
First quarter
- MTST – Chris Murray 3-yard run (Gabe Peppenger kick), 2:13. Bobcats 7–0. Drive: 4 plays, 60 yards, 1:17.

Second quarter

- PRST – Jason Talley 1-yard run (Greycen Kennedy kick), 6:28. Tied 7–7. Drive: 7 plays, 46 yards, 2:04.
- MTST – Gabe Peppenger 34-yard field goal, 1:28. Bobcats 10–7. Drive: 11 plays, 53 yards, 5:00.

Third quarter

- MTST – Chris Murray 5-yard run (kick blocked), 9:01. Bobcats 16–7. Drive: 12 plays, 75 yards, 5:59.
- MTST – Chad Kanow 0-yard fumble return (Gabe Peppenger kick), 7:31. Bobcats 23–7.
- PRST – Charlie Taumoepeau 26-yard pass from Josh Kraght (Graycen Kennedy kick), 2:14. Bobcats 23–14. Drive: 7 plays, 61 yards, 2:21.

Fourth quarter

- MTST – Justin Paige 23-yard run (Gabe Peppenger kick), 7:37. Bobcats 30–14. Drive: 2 plays, 26 yards, 1:04.
- PRST – Charlie Taumoepeau 24-yard pass from Josh Kraght (Josh Kraght pass), 1:21. Bobcats 30–22. Drive: 9 plays, 83 yards, 2:02.

Statistics	PRST	MTST
First downs	25	17
Total yards	419	412
Rushing yards	102	403
Passing yards	317	9
Turnovers	1	1
Time of possession	27:20	32:40

Team	Category	Player	Statistics
Portland State	Passing	Josh Kraght	28/52, 317 yards, 2 TD
Portland State	Rushing	Jason Talley	12 rushes, 39 yards, TD
Portland State	Receiving	Darnell Adams	9 receptions, 118 yards
Montana State	Passing	Chris Murray	2/9, 9 yards, INT
Montana State	Rushing	Chris Murray	18 rushes, 126 yards, 2 TD
Montana State	Receiving	Mitchell Herbert	1 reception, 8 yards

=== Northern Arizona ===
Northern Arizona Lumberjacks at Portland State Vikings – Game summary

Quarter	1	2	3	4	Total
Lumberjacks	14	0	14	14	42
Vikings	7	0	6	7	20

at Providence Park, Portland, Oregon

- Date: October 14
- Game time: 2:00 p.m. PDT
- Game weather: Sunny, 55 °F (13 °C)
- Game attendance: 4,430
- Referee: Jim Crowley
- TV: Pluto TV
- Box score, Recap

Game information
First quarter
- PRST – Za'Quan Summers 65-yard run (Greychen Kennedy kick), 13:01. Vikings 7–0. Drive: 3 plays, 71 yards, 0:59.
- NAU – Justis Stokes 8-yard pass from Case Cookus (Griffin Roehler kick), 10:46. Tied 7–7. Drive: 6 plays, 87 yards, 2:09.
- NAU – Jonathan Baldwin 3-yard pass from Case Cookus (Griffin Roehler kick), 5:09. Lumberjacks 14–7. Drive: 12 plays, 73 yards, 3:45.

Second quarter

- No scoring plays

Third quarter

- PRST – Greychen Kennedy 29-yard field goal, 10:04. Lumberjacks 14–10. Drive: 12 plays, 56 yards, 4:49.
- PRST – Greychen Kennedy 7:34. Lumberjacks 14–13. Drive: 5 plays, 24 yards, 1:28.
- NAU – Maurice Davison 25-yard interception return (Griffin Roehler kick), 5:23. Lumberjacks 21–13.
- NAU – Cory Young 10-yard run (Griffin Roehler kick), 4:08. Lumberjacks 28–13. Drive: 3 plays, 52 yards, 0:33.

Fourth quarter

- NAU – Elijah Marks 22-yard pass from Case Cookus (Griffin Roehler kick), 14:54. Lumberjacks 35–13. Drive: 3 plays, 63 yards, 0:58.
- NAU – Matthew Kempton 18-yard pass from Case Cookus (Griffin Roehler kick), 10:57. Lumberjacks 42–13. Drive: 4 plays, 60 yards, 1:05.
- PRST – Chase Morrison 1-yard run (Graycen Kennedy kick), 1:39. Lumberjacks 42–40. Drive: 9 plays, 80 yards, 3:10.

Statistics	NAU	PRST
First downs	20	26
Total yards	484	457
Rushing yards	131	305
Passing yards	353	152
Turnovers	0	2
Time of possession	23:52	36:08

Team	Category	Player	Statistics
Northern Arizona	Passing	Case Cookus	23/39, 347 yards, 4 TD
Northern Arizona	Rushing	Cory Young	13 rushes, 109 yards, TD
Northern Arizona	Receiving	Elijah Marks	6 receptions, 173 yards, TD
Portland State	Passing	Josh Kraght	20/36, 152 yards, 2 INT
Portland State	Rushing	Za'Quan Summers	10 rushes, 104 yards, TD
Portland State	Receiving	Charlie Taumoepeau	4 receptions, 52 yards

=== At Idaho State ===
Portland State Vikings at Idaho State Bengals – Game summary

Quarter	1	2	3	4	Total
Vikings	9	7	7	7	30
Bengals	10	21	21	7	59

at Holt Arena, Pocatello, Idaho

- Date: October 21
- Game time: 1:30 p.m. PDT/2:30 p.m. MDT
- Game attendance: 5,942
- TV: Pluto TV

Statistics	PRST	IDST
First downs		
Total yards		
Rushing yards		
Passing yards		
Turnovers		
Time of possession		

Team	Category	Player	Statistics
Portland State	Passing		
Portland State	Rushing		
Portland State	Receiving		
Idaho State	Passing		
Idaho State	Rushing		
Idaho State	Receiving		

=== North Dakota ===
North Dakota Fighting Hawks at Portland State Vikings – Game summary

Quarter	1	2	3	4	Total
Fighting Hawks	0	13	21	14	48
Vikings	14	0	0	7	21

at Providence Park, Portland, Oregon

- Date: October 28
- Game time: 4:00 p.m. PDT
- Game attendance: 3,002
- TV: ELVN

Statistics	UND	PRST
First downs		
Total yards		
Rushing yards		
Passing yards		
Turnovers		
Time of possession		

Team	Category	Player	Statistics
North Dakota	Passing		
North Dakota	Rushing		
North Dakota	Receiving		
Portland State	Passing		
Portland State	Rushing		
Portland State	Receiving		

=== At Cal Poly ===
Portland State Vikings at Cal Poly Mustangs – Game summary

Quarter	1	2	3	4	Total
Vikings	14	7	7	0	28
Mustangs	7	14	7	7	35

at Alex G. Spanos Stadium, San Luis Obispo, California

- Date: November 4
- Game time: 6:05 p.m. PST
- Game attendance: 5,393
- TV: Pluto TV

Statistics	PRST	CP
First downs		
Total yards		
Rushing yards		
Passing yards		
Turnovers		
Time of possession		

Team	Category	Player	Statistics
Portland State	Passing		
Portland State	Rushing		
Portland State	Receiving		
Cal Poly	Passing		
Cal Poly	Rushing		
Cal Poly	Receiving		

=== No. 14 Weber State ===
No. 14 Weber State Wildcats at Portland State Vikings – Game summary

Quarter	1	2	3	4	Total
No. 14 Wildcats	14	35	7	7	63
Vikings	3	0	7	7	17

at Providence Park, Portland, Oregon

- Date: November 11
- Game time: 2:00 p.m. PST
- Game attendance: 3,792
- TV: Pluto TV

Statistics	WEB	PRST
First downs		
Total yards		
Rushing yards		
Passing yards		
Turnovers		
Time of possession		

Team	Category	Player	Statistics
Weber State	Passing		
Weber State	Rushing		
Weber State	Receiving		
Portland State	Passing		
Portland State	Rushing		
Portland State	Receiving		

=== At No. 18 Eastern Washington ===
Portland State Vikings at Eastern Washington Eagles – Game summary

Quarter	1	2	3	4	Total
Vikings	14	12	0	7	33
No. 18 Eagles	14	17	28	0	59

at Roos Field, Cheney, Washington

- Date: November 18
- Game time: 3:00 p.m. PST
- Game attendance: 8,717
- TV: RTNW

Statistics	PRST	EWU
First downs		
Total yards		
Rushing yards		
Passing yards		
Turnovers		
Time of possession		

Team	Category	Player	Statistics
Portland State	Passing		
Portland State	Rushing		
Portland State	Receiving		
Eastern Washington	Passing		
Eastern Washington	Rushing		
Eastern Washington	Receiving		
