= 2017 UC Davis Aggies football team =

American college football season

2017 UC Davis Aggies football
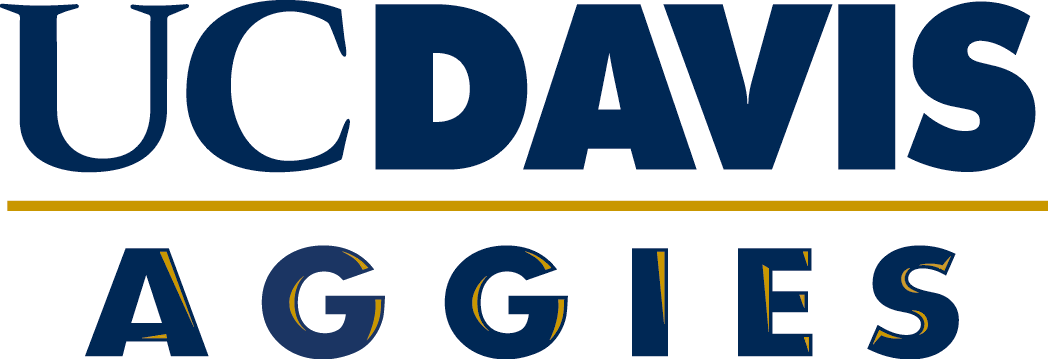
- Conference: Big Sky Conference
- Record: 5–6 (3–5 Big Sky)
- Head coach: Dan Hawkins (1st season)
- Offensive coordinator: Tim Plough (1st season)
- Defensive coordinator: Robert Tucker (1st season)
- Home stadium: Aggie Stadium

2017 Big Sky Conference football standings
	Conf.			Overall
Team	W		L	W		L
No. 14 Southern Utah +^	7	–	1	9	–	3
No. 5 Weber State +^	7	–	1	11	–	3
Northern Arizona ^	6	–	2	7	–	5
No. 21 Eastern Washington	6	–	2	7	–	4
Sacramento State	6	–	2	7	–	4
Montana	5	–	3	7	–	4
Montana State	5	–	3	5	–	6
UC Davis	3	–	5	5	–	6
Idaho State	2	–	6	4	–	7
Northern Colorado	2	–	6	3	–	7
North Dakota	2	–	6	3	–	8
Cal Poly	1	–	7	1	–	10
Portland State	0	–	8	0	–	11
$ – Conference champion; ^ – FCS playoff participant; Rankings from STATS Poll

The 2017 UC Davis football team represented the University of California, Davis as a member of the Big Sky Conference during the 2017 NCAA Division I FCS football season. Led by first-year head coach Dan Hawkins, UC Davis compiled an overall record of 5–6 with a mark of 3–5 in conference play, placing eighth in the Big Sky. The Aggies played home games at Aggie Stadium in Davis, California.

== Schedule ==
Date	Time	Opponent	Site	TV	Result	Attendance
September 2	5:30 p.m.	at San Diego State*	Qualcomm Stadium; San Diego, CA	Stadium	L 17–38	46,132
September 9	6:00 p.m.	San Diego*	Aggie Stadium; Davis, CA	Pluto TV	W 35–7	6,588
September 16	2:00 p.m.	at Portland State*	Providence Park; Portland, OR	ELVN	W 37–14	4,442
September 23	4:00 p.m.	at No. 23 Weber State	Stewart Stadium; Ogden, UT	Pluto TV	L 3–41	9,450
September 30	6:00 p.m.	North Dakota	Aggie Stadium; Davis, CA	ELVN	W 48–24	9,508
October 7	6:00 p.m.	No. 10 Eastern Washington	Aggie Stadium; Davis, CA	Pluto TV	L 38–41	8,158
October 21	4:00 p.m.	at Northern Arizona	Walkup Skydome; Flagstaff, AZ	Pluto TV	L 31–45	5,093
October 28	4:00 p.m.	Cal Poly^{†}	Aggie Stadium; Davis, CA (Battle for the Golden Horseshoe)	Pluto TV	W 31–28	10,503
November 4	1:30 p.m.	at Idaho State	Holt Arena; Pocatello, ID	Pluto TV	W 56–17	5,762
November 11	4:00 p.m.	No. 15 Southern Utah	Aggie Stadium; Davis, CA	Pluto TV	L 27–47	6,715
November 18	2:00 p.m.	at Sacramento State	Hornet Stadium; Sacramento, CA (Causeway Classic)	Pluto TV	L 47–52	11,828
*Non-conference game; ^{†}Homecoming; Rankings from STATS Poll released prior to the game; All times are in Pacific time

Despite Portland State also being a member of the Big Sky Conference, the September 16 game against UC Davis was considered a non-conference game.

== Game summaries ==
=== At San Diego State ===
	1	2	3	4	Total
Aggies	3	0	0	14	17
Aztecs	10	14	14	0	38

=== San Diego ===
	1	2	3	4	Total
Toreros	7	0	0	0	7
Aggies	7	7	7	14	35

=== At Portland State ===
	1	2	3	4	Total
Aggies	10	7	6	14	37
Vikings	0	0	7	7	14

=== At Weber State ===
	1	2	3	4	Total
Aggies	3	0	0	0	3
No. 23 Wildcats	17	14	10	0	41

=== North Dakota ===
	1	2	3	4	Total
Fighting Hawks	10	7	0	7	24
Aggies	21	17	3	7	48

=== Eastern Washington ===
	1	2	3	4	Total
No. 10 Eagles	6	7	7	21	41
Aggies	7	7	14	10	38

=== At Northern Arizona ===
	1	2	3	4	Total
Aggies	7	0	17	7	31
Lumberjacks	0	28	7	10	45

=== Cal Poly ===
	1	2	3	4	Total
Mustangs	7	7	7	7	28
Aggies	21	10	0	0	31

=== At Idaho State ===
	1	2	3	4	Total
Aggies	21	7	7	21	56
Bengals	0	10	7	0	17

=== Southern Utah ===
	1	2	3	4	Total
No. 15 Thunderbirds	14	12	14	7	47
Aggies	0	7	7	13	27

=== At Sacramento State ===
	1	2	3	4	Total
Aggies	7	7	20	13	47
Hornets	17	21	14	0	52
