= 2017 Sacramento State Hornets football team =

American college football season

2017 Sacramento State Hornets football
- Conference: Big Sky Conference
- Record: 7–4 (6–2 Big Sky)
- Head coach: Jody Sears (4th season)
- Co-offensive coordinators: Luke Huard (1st season); Paul Wulff (2nd season)
- Defensive coordinator: Sammy Lawanson (2nd season)
- Home stadium: Hornet Stadium

2017 Big Sky Conference football standings
	Conf.			Overall
Team	W		L	W		L
No. 14 Southern Utah +^	7	–	1	9	–	3
No. 5 Weber State +^	7	–	1	11	–	3
Northern Arizona ^	6	–	2	7	–	5
No. 21 Eastern Washington	6	–	2	7	–	4
Sacramento State	6	–	2	7	–	4
Montana	5	–	3	7	–	4
Montana State	5	–	3	5	–	6
UC Davis	3	–	5	5	–	6
Idaho State	2	–	6	4	–	7
Northern Colorado	2	–	6	3	–	7
North Dakota	2	–	6	3	–	8
Cal Poly	1	–	7	1	–	10
Portland State	0	–	8	0	–	11
$ – Conference champion; ^ – FCS playoff participant; Rankings from STATS Poll

The 2017 Sacramento State Hornets football team represented California State University, Sacramento as a member of the Big Sky Conference during the 2017 NCAA Division I FCS football season. Led by fourth-year head coach Jody Sears, Sacramento State compiled an overall record of 7–4 with a mark of 6–2 in conference play, placing in a three-way tie for third in the Big Sky. The Hornets played home games at Hornet Stadium in Sacramento, California.

== Schedule ==
Date	Time	Opponent	Site	TV	Result	Attendance
September 1	6:00 p.m.	at Idaho*	Kibbie Dome; Moscow, ID	ESPN3	L 6–28	10,526
September 9	6:00 p.m.	Incarnate Word*	Hornet Stadium; Sacramento, CA	Pluto TV	W 56–22	7,806
September 16	6:00 p.m.	Weber State*	Hornet Stadium; Sacramento, CA	Pluto TV	L 24–31	8,365
September 23	6:00 p.m.	Southern Utah	Hornet Stadium; Sacramento, CA	Pluto TV	W 54–27	7,272
September 30	1:35 p.m.	at No. 9 Eastern Washington	Roos Field; Cheney, WA	Pluto TV	L 31–52	10,917
October 14	6:00 p.m.	Idaho State	Hornet Stadium; Sacramento, CA	Pluto TV	W 41–21	10,008
October 21	10:30 a.m.	at North Dakota	Alerus Center; Grand Forks, ND	Pluto TV	W 34–27	9,259
October 28	4:00 p.m.	at Northern Arizona	Walkup Skydome; Flagstaff, AZ	Pluto TV	L 17–37	6,068
November 4	6:00 p.m.	Northern Colorado	Hornet Stadium; Sacramento, CA	ELVN	W 50–21	4,612
November 11	6:05 p.m.	at Cal Poly	Alex G. Spanos Stadium; San Luis Obispo, CA	Pluto TV	W 49–14	6,729
November 18	2:00 p.m.	UC Davis	Hornet Stadium; Sacramento, CA (Causeway Classic)	Pluto TV	W 52–47	11,828
*Non-conference game; Rankings from STATS Poll released prior to the game; All times are in Pacific time

Despite Weber State also being a member of the Big Sky Conference, the September 16 game against Sacramento State was considered a non-conference game.

== Game summaries ==
=== At Idaho ===
	1	2	3	4	Total
Hornets	0	6	0	0	6
Vandals	0	14	7	7	28

=== Incarnate Word ===
	1	2	3	4	Total
Cardinals	0	3	5	14	22
Hornets	7	21	28	0	56

=== Weber State ===
	1	2	3	4	Total
Wildcats	16	8	0	7	31
Hornets	0	14	7	3	24

=== Southern Utah ===
	1	2	3	4	Total
Thunderbirds	7	7	0	13	27
Hornets	7	23	10	14	54

=== At Eastern Washington ===
	1	2	3	4	Total
Hornets	7	10	7	7	31
No. 9 Eagles	21	7	14	10	52

=== Idaho State ===
	1	2	3	4	Total
Bengals	0	7	14	0	21
Hornets	7	10	14	10	41

=== At North Dakota ===
	1	2	3	4	Total
Hornets	3	7	24	0	34
Fighting Hawks	0	10	7	10	27

=== At Northern Arizona ===
	1	2	3	4	Total
Hornets	0	10	7	0	17
Lumberjacks	10	7	6	14	37

=== Northern Colorado ===
	1	2	3	4	Total
Bears	7	14	0	0	21
Hornets	14	6	9	21	50

=== At Cal Poly ===
	1	2	3	4	Total
Hornets	14	14	21	0	49
Mustangs	0	0	0	14	14

=== UC Davis ===
	1	2	3	4	Total
Aggies	7	7	20	13	47
Hornets	17	21	14	0	52
