= 2017 Idaho State Bengals football team =

American college football season

2017 Idaho State Bengals football
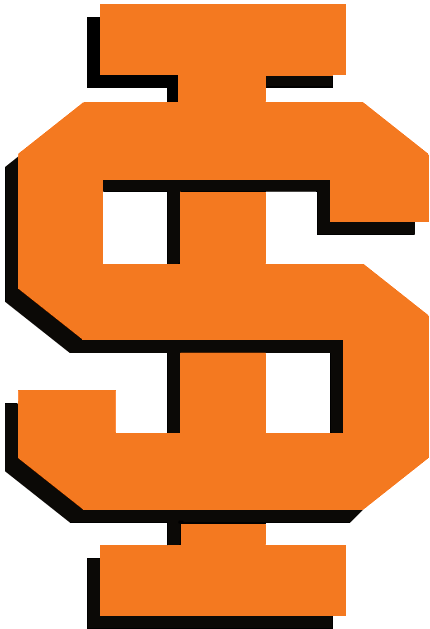
- Conference: Big Sky Conference
- Record: 4–7 (2–6 Big Sky)
- Head coach: Rob Phenicie (1st season)
- Offensive coordinator: Matt Troxel (1st season)
- Defensive coordinator: Spencer Toone (6th season)
- Home stadium: Holt Arena

2017 Big Sky Conference football standings
	Conf.			Overall
Team	W		L	W		L
No. 14 Southern Utah +^	7	–	1	9	–	3
No. 5 Weber State +^	7	–	1	11	–	3
Northern Arizona ^	6	–	2	7	–	5
No. 21 Eastern Washington	6	–	2	7	–	4
Sacramento State	6	–	2	7	–	4
Montana	5	–	3	7	–	4
Montana State	5	–	3	5	–	6
UC Davis	3	–	5	5	–	6
Idaho State	2	–	6	4	–	7
Northern Colorado	2	–	6	3	–	7
North Dakota	2	–	6	3	–	8
Cal Poly	1	–	7	1	–	10
Portland State	0	–	8	0	–	11
$ – Conference champion; ^ – FCS playoff participant; Rankings from STATS Poll

The 2017 Idaho State Bengals football team represented Idaho State University as a member of the Big Sky Conference during the 2017 NCAA Division I FCS football season. Led by first-year head coach Rob Phenicie, the Bengals compiled an overall record of 4–7 with a mark of 2–6 in conference play, placing in a three-way tie for ninth in the Big Sky. Idaho State played their home games at Holt Arena in Pocatello, Idaho.

== Schedule ==
Date	Time	Opponent	Site	TV	Result	Attendance	Source
August 31	6:30 p.m.	Western Oregon*	Holt Arena; Pocatello, ID	Pluto TV	W 37–6	5,395	
September 7	6:00 p.m.	at Utah State*	Maverik Stadium; Logan, UT	Stadium	L 13–51	19,368	
September 16	5:00 p.m.	at Nevada*	Mackay Stadium; Reno, NV	AT&T RM	W 30–28	16,394	
September 23	1:00 p.m.	at Northern Colorado	Nottingham Field; Greeley, CO	Pluto TV	L 42–43	5,273	
September 30	2:30 p.m.	Cal Poly	Holt Arena; Pocatello, ID	Pluto TV	W 38–34	7,105	
October 7	2:30 p.m.	Montana	Holt Arena; Pocatello, ID	ELVN, Pluto TV	L 31–39	7,279	
October 14	7:00 p.m.	at Sacramento State	Hornet Stadium; Sacramento, CA	Pluto TV	L 21–41	10,008	
October 21	2:30 p.m.	Portland State	Holt Arena; Pocatello, ID	Pluto TV	W 59–30	5,942	
October 28	1:30 p.m.	at Montana State	Bobcat Stadium; Bozeman, MT	RTNW	L 14–28	17,097	
November 4	2:30 p.m.	UC Davis	Holt Arena; Pocatello, ID	Pluto TV	L 17–56	5,762	
November 18	2:00 p.m.	at No. 12 Weber State	Stewart Stadium; Ogden, UT	Pluto TV	L 7–35	9,539	
*Non-conference game; Rankings from STATS Poll released prior to the game; All times are in Mountain time

== Game summaries ==
=== Western Oregon ===
	1	2	3	4	Total
Wolves	3	3	0	0	6
Bengals	0	3	13	21	37

=== At Utah State ===
	1	2	3	4	Total
Bengals	0	6	7	0	13
Aggies	17	21	7	6	51

=== At Nevada ===
	1	2	3	4	Total
Bengals	10	13	7	0	30
Wolf Pack	0	7	7	14	28

Idaho State's first win over an FBS team since 2000 against Utah State

=== At Northern Colorado ===
	1	2	3	4	Total
Bengals	10	7	13	12	42
Bears	10	10	20	3	43

=== Cal Poly ===
	1	2	3	4	Total
Mustangs	0	17	14	3	34
Bengals	10	7	7	14	38

=== Montana ===
	1	2	3	4	Total
Grizzlies	7	6	19	7	39
Bengals	7	14	7	3	31

=== At Sacramento State ===
	1	2	3	4	Total
Bengals	0	7	14	0	21
Hornets	7	10	14	10	41

=== Portland State ===
	1	2	3	4	Total
Vikings	9	7	7	7	30
Bengals	10	21	21	7	59

=== At Montana State ===
	1	2	3	4	Total
Bengals	0	14	0	0	14
Bobcats	14	0	7	7	28

=== UC Davis ===
	1	2	3	4	Total
Aggies	21	7	7	21	56
Bengals	0	10	7	0	17

=== At Weber State ===
	1	2	3	4	Total
Bengals	7	0	0	0	7
No. 12 Wildcats	7	14	7	7	35
