= 2017 Northern Colorado Bears football team =

American college football season

2017 Northern Colorado Bears football
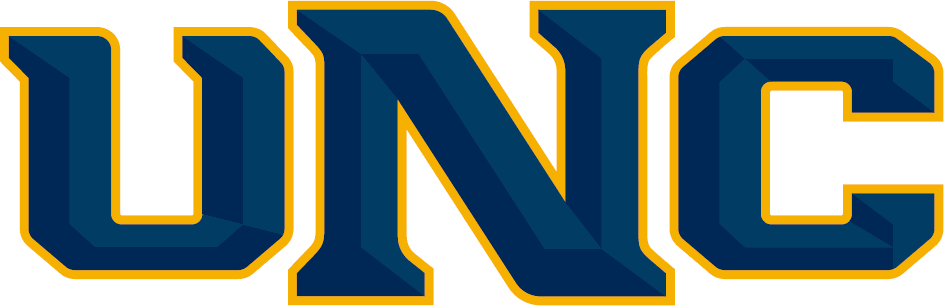
- Conference: Big Sky Conference
- Record: 3–7 (2–6 Big Sky)
- Head coach: Earnest Collins Jr. (7th season)
- Offensive coordinator: James Jones (2nd season)
- Offensive scheme: Spread
- Defensive coordinator: Larry Kerr (4th season)
- Base defense: 4–3
- Home stadium: Nottingham Field

2017 Big Sky Conference football standings
	Conf.			Overall
Team	W		L	W		L
No. 14 Southern Utah +^	7	–	1	9	–	3
No. 5 Weber State +^	7	–	1	11	–	3
Northern Arizona ^	6	–	2	7	–	5
No. 21 Eastern Washington	6	–	2	7	–	4
Sacramento State	6	–	2	7	–	4
Montana	5	–	3	7	–	4
Montana State	5	–	3	5	–	6
UC Davis	3	–	5	5	–	6
Idaho State	2	–	6	4	–	7
Northern Colorado	2	–	6	3	–	7
North Dakota	2	–	6	3	–	8
Cal Poly	1	–	7	1	–	10
Portland State	0	–	8	0	–	11
$ – Conference champion; ^ – FCS playoff participant; Rankings from STATS Poll

The 2017 Northern Colorado Bears football team represented the University of Northern Colorado in the 2017 NCAA Division I FCS football season. They were led by seventh-year head coach Earnest Collins Jr. and played their home games at Nottingham Field. They were a member of the Big Sky Conference. They finished the season 3–7, 2–6 in Big Sky play to finish in a three-way tie for ninth place.

== Schedule ==
Date	Time	Opponent	Site	TV	Result	Attendance
September 2	2:00 p.m.	College of Idaho*	Nottingham Field; Greeley, CO	CET	W 41–14	3,547
September 9	5:30 p.m.	at No. 16 (FBS) Florida*	Ben Hill Griffin Stadium; Gainesville, FL		Cancelled^{[a]}	
September 16	12:00 p.m.	at Colorado*	Folsom Field; Boulder, CO	P12N	L 21–41	44,318
September 23	1:00 p.m.	Idaho State	Nottingham Field; Greeley, CO	Pluto TV	W 43–42	5,273
September 30	5:00 p.m.	at Northern Arizona	Walkup Skydome; Flagstaff, AZ	Pluto TV	L 20–48	5,107
October 7	1:30 p.m.	at North Dakota	Alerus Center; Grand Forks, ND	Pluto TV	L 38–48	10,234
October 21	12:30 p.m.	Montana State	Nottingham Field; Greeley, CO	ATTRM	L 24–27	5,378
October 28	12:30 p.m.	No. 25 Southern Utah	Nottingham Field; Greeley, CO	CET	L 14–27	3,869
November 4	7:00 p.m.	at Sacramento State	Hornet Stadium; Sacramento, CA	ELVN	L 21–50	4,612
November 11	1:00 p.m.	at Montana	Washington–Grizzly Stadium; Missoula, MT	ATTRM	L 14–44	22,048
November 18	11:30 a.m.	Cal Poly	Nottingham Field; Greeley, CO	CET	W 42–0	3,650
*Non-conference game; Rankings from STATS Poll released prior to the game; All times are in Mountain time

^{^[a]}The game between Florida and Northern Colorado, had been rescheduled in advance of the arrival of Hurricane Irma, but on September 7, both schools agreed to canceled the game completely.

== Game summaries ==
=== College of Idaho ===
	1	2	3	4	Total
Coyotes	0	7	0	7	14
Bears	28	7	3	3	41

=== At Colorado ===
	1	2	3	4	Total
Bears	7	7	7	0	21
Buffaloes	14	14	3	10	41

=== Idaho State ===
	1	2	3	4	Total
Bengals	10	7	13	12	42
Bears	10	10	20	3	43

=== At Northern Arizona ===
	1	2	3	4	Total
Bears	0	7	13	0	20
Lumberjacks	7	13	14	14	48

=== At North Dakota ===
	1	2	3	4	Total
Bears	7	17	14	0	38
Fighting Hawks	14	14	10	10	48

=== Montana State ===
	1	2	3	4	Total
Bobcats	0	7	3	17	27
Bears	7	14	0	3	24

=== Southern Utah ===
	1	2	3	4	Total
No. 25 Thunderbirds	13	7	7	0	27
Bears	0	7	7	0	14

=== At Sacramento State ===
	1	2	3	4	Total
Bears	14	7	0	0	21
Hornets	14	6	9	21	50

=== At Montana ===
	1	2	3	4	Total
Bears	7	0	0	7	14
Grizzlies	14	23	7	0	44

=== Cal Poly ===
	1	2	3	4	Total
Mustangs	0	0	0	0	0
Bears	0	21	21	0	42
