= 2017 Montana State Bobcats football team =

American college football season

2017 Montana State Bobcats football
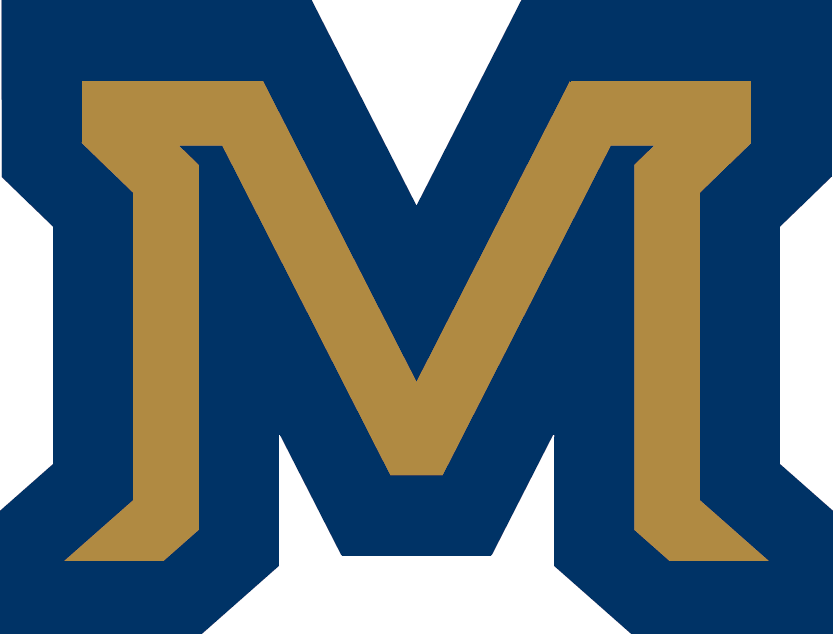
- Conference: Big Sky Conference
- Record: 5–6 (5–3 Big Sky)
- Head coach: Jeff Choate (2nd season)
- Offensive coordinator: Courtney Messingham (2nd season)
- Offensive scheme: Multiple
- Defensive coordinator: Ty Gregorak (2nd season)
- Base defense: 4–3
- Home stadium: Bobcat Stadium

2017 Big Sky Conference football standings
	Conf.			Overall
Team	W		L	W		L
No. 14 Southern Utah +^	7	–	1	9	–	3
No. 5 Weber State +^	7	–	1	11	–	3
Northern Arizona ^	6	–	2	7	–	5
No. 21 Eastern Washington	6	–	2	7	–	4
Sacramento State	6	–	2	7	–	4
Montana	5	–	3	7	–	4
Montana State	5	–	3	5	–	6
UC Davis	3	–	5	5	–	6
Idaho State	2	–	6	4	–	7
Northern Colorado	2	–	6	3	–	7
North Dakota	2	–	6	3	–	8
Cal Poly	1	–	7	1	–	10
Portland State	0	–	8	0	–	11
$ – Conference champion; ^ – FCS playoff participant; Rankings from STATS Poll

The 2017 Montana State Bobcats football team represented Montana State University as a member of the Big Sky Conference during the 2017 NCAA Division I FCS football season. Led by second-year head coach Jeff Choate, Montana State compiled an overall record of 5–6 with a mark of 5–3 in conference play, tying for sixth place in the Big Sky. The Bobcats played their home games at Bobcat Stadium in Bozeman, Montana.

== Schedule ==
Date	Time	Opponent	Site	TV	Result	Attendance
September 2	8:30 p.m.	at No. 24 (FBS) Washington State*	Martin Stadium; Pullman, WA	FS1	L 0–31	30,254
September 9	6:00 p.m.	No. 4 South Dakota State*	Bobcat Stadium; Bozeman, MT	SWX MT	L 27–31	19,817
September 23	1:30 p.m.	at No. 17 North Dakota	Alerus Center; Grand Forks, ND	Midco	W 49–21	12,342
September 30	1:30 p.m.	No. 20 Weber State^{†}	Bobcat Stadium; Bozeman, MT	RTNW	L 17–25	19,557
October 7	11:00 a.m.	Portland State	Bobcat Stadium; Bozeman, MT	RTNW	W 30–22	18,987
October 14	2:05 p.m.	at No. 10 Eastern Washington	Roos Field; Cheney, WA	SWX MT	L 19–31	11,301
October 21	12:30 p.m.	at Northern Colorado	Nottingham Field; Greeley, CO	ATTRM	W 27–24	5,378
October 28	1:30 p.m.	Idaho State	Bobcat Stadium; Bozeman, MT	RTNW	W 28–14	17,097
November 4	12:00 p.m.	No. 25 Kennesaw State*	Bobcat Stadium; Bozeman, MT	SWX MT	L 14–16	16,337
November 11	5:00 p.m.	at No. 24 Northern Arizona	Walkup Skydome; Flagstaff, AZ	ELVN	L 36–37	6,187
November 18	12:00 p.m.	Montana	Bobcat Stadium; Bozeman, MT (rivalry)	RTNW	W 31–23	19,907
*Non-conference game; ^{†}Homecoming; Rankings from STATS Poll released prior to the game; All times are in Mountain time

== Game summaries ==
=== At Washington State ===
	1	2	3	4	Total
Bobcats	0	0	0	0	0
No. 24 (FBS) Cougars	7	7	7	10	31

=== South Dakota State ===
	1	2	3	4	Total
No. 4 Jackrabbits	10	7	7	7	31
Bobcats	0	7	14	6	27

=== At North Dakota ===
	1	2	3	4	Total
Bobcats	7	21	7	14	49
No. 17 Fighting Hawks	0	10	11	0	21

=== Weber State ===
	1	2	3	4	Total
No. 20 Wildcats	0	9	13	3	25
Bobcats	3	7	0	7	17

=== Portland State ===
	1	2	3	4	Total
Vikings	0	7	7	8	22
Bobcats	7	3	13	7	30

=== At Eastern Washington ===
	1	2	3	4	Total
Bobcats	0	7	0	12	19
No. 10 Eagles	7	10	7	7	31

=== At Northern Colorado ===
	1	2	3	4	Total
Bobcats	0	7	3	17	27
Bears	7	14	0	3	24

=== Idaho State ===
	1	2	3	4	Total
Bengals	0	14	0	0	14
Bobcats	14	0	7	7	28

=== Kennesaw State ===
	1	2	3	4	Total
No. 25 Owls	7	3	3	3	16
Bobcats	7	0	7	0	14

=== At Northern Arizona ===
	1	2	3	4	Total
Bobcats	7	9	7	13	36
No. 24 Lumberjacks	3	13	14	7	37

=== Montana ===
	1	2	3	4	Total
Grizzlies	3	10	0	10	23
Bobcats	0	21	3	7	31
