= 2017 Cal Poly Mustangs football team =

American college football season

2017 Cal Poly Mustangs football
- Conference: Big Sky Conference
- Record: 1–10 (1–7 Big Sky)
- Head coach: Tim Walsh (9th season)
- Offensive coordinator: Jim Craft (1st season)
- Offensive scheme: Spread triple-option
- Defensive coordinator: Josh Brown (6th season)
- Base defense: 3–4
- Home stadium: Alex G. Spanos Stadium

2017 Big Sky Conference football standings
| | Conf. | | | Overall |
| Team | W | | L | W | | L |
|---|---|---|---|---|---|---|
| No. 14 Southern Utah +^ | 7 | – | 1 | 9 | – | 3 |
| No. 5 Weber State +^ | 7 | – | 1 | 11 | – | 3 |
| Northern Arizona ^ | 6 | – | 2 | 7 | – | 5 |
| No. 21 Eastern Washington | 6 | – | 2 | 7 | – | 4 |
| Sacramento State | 6 | – | 2 | 7 | – | 4 |
| Montana | 5 | – | 3 | 7 | – | 4 |
| Montana State | 5 | – | 3 | 5 | – | 6 |
| UC Davis | 3 | – | 5 | 5 | – | 6 |
| Idaho State | 2 | – | 6 | 4 | – | 7 |
| Northern Colorado | 2 | – | 6 | 3 | – | 7 |
| North Dakota | 2 | – | 6 | 3 | – | 8 |
| Cal Poly | 1 | – | 7 | 1 | – | 10 |
| Portland State | 0 | – | 8 | 0 | – | 11 |
$ – Conference champion; ^ – FCS playoff participant; Rankings from STATS Poll

The 2017 Cal Poly Mustangs football team represented California Polytechnic State University, San Luis Obispo as member of the Big Sky Conference during the 2017 NCAA Division I FCS football season. Led by ninth-year head coach Tim Walsh, Cal Poly compiled an overall record of 1–10 with a mark of 1–7 in conference play, placing 12th in the Big Sky. The Mustangs played home games at Mustang Stadium in San Luis Obispo, California.

== Schedule ==
| Date | Time | Opponent | Rank | Site | TV | Result | Attendance | Source |
|---|---|---|---|---|---|---|---|---|
| August 26 | 4:00 p.m. | Colgate* | No. 23 | Alex G. Spanos Stadium; San Luis Obispo, CA | ESPNU | L 14–20 | 8,428 | |
| September 2 | 4:30 p.m. | at San Jose State* | No. 23 | CEFCU Stadium; San Jose, CA | | L 13–34 | 10,667 | |
| September 9 | 2:00 p.m. | at No. 21 Northern Iowa* | | UNI-Dome; Cedar Falls, IA | ESPN3 | L 38–45 ^{OT} | 10,246 | |
| September 23 | 6:05 p.m. | Northern Arizona | | Alex G. Spanos Stadium; San Luis Obispo, CA | ELVN | L 10–28 | 7,726 | |
| September 30 | 1:30 p.m. | at Idaho State | | Holt Arena; Pocatello, ID | Pluto TV | L 34–38 | 7,105 | |
| October 7 | 5:00 p.m. | at Southern Utah | | Eccles Coliseum; Cedar City, UT | Pluto TV | L 14–20 | 10,633 | |
| October 21 | 6:05 p.m. | No. 23 Weber State | | Alex G. Spanos Stadium; San Luis Obispo, CA | Pluto TV | L 3–17 | 9,324 | |
| October 28 | 4:00 p.m. | at UC Davis | | Aggie Stadium; Davis, CA (Battle for the Golden Horseshoe) | Pluto TV | L 28–31 | 10,503 | |
| November 4 | 6:05 p.m. | Portland State^{†} | | Alex G. Spanos Stadium; San Luis Obispo, CA | Pluto TV | W 35–28 | 5,393 | |
| November 11 | 6:05 p.m. | Sacramento State | | Alex G. Spanos Stadium; San Luis Obispo, CA | Pluto TV | L 14–49 | 6,729 | |
| November 18 | 10:30 a.m. | at Northern Colorado | | Nottingham Field; Greeley, CO | | L 0–42 | 3,650 | |
*Non-conference game; ^{†}Homecoming; Rankings from STATS Poll released prior to the game; All times are in Pacific time

== Rankings ==
Ranking movements Legend: ██ Increase in ranking ██ Decrease in ranking — = Not ranked RV = Received votes
| | Week | | | | | | | | | | | | | |
| Poll | Pre | 1 | 2 | 3 | 4 | 5 | 6 | 7 | 8 | 9 | 10 | 11 | 12 | Final |
|---|---|---|---|---|---|---|---|---|---|---|---|---|---|---|
| STATS FCS | 23 | RV | RV | RV | — | — | — | — | — | — | — | — | — | — |
| Coaches | 23 | RV | — | — | — | — | — | — | — | — | — | — | — | — |

== Game summaries ==
=== Colgate ===
| | 1 | 2 | 3 | 4 | Total |
|---|---|---|---|---|---|
| Raiders | 10 | 7 | 3 | 0 | 20 |
| No. 23 Mustangs | 0 | 0 | 0 | 14 | 14 |

=== At San Jose State ===
| | 1 | 2 | 3 | 4 | Total |
|---|---|---|---|---|---|
| No. 23 Mustangs | 3 | 3 | 0 | 7 | 13 |
| Spartans | 0 | 7 | 13 | 14 | 34 |

=== At Northern Iowa ===
| | 1 | 2 | 3 | 4 | OT | Total |
|---|---|---|---|---|---|---|
| Mustangs | 7 | 14 | 3 | 14 | 0 | 38 |
| No. 21 Panthers | 0 | 28 | 7 | 3 | 7 | 45 |

=== Northern Arizona ===
| | 1 | 2 | 3 | 4 | Total |
|---|---|---|---|---|---|
| Lumberjacks | 7 | 7 | 14 | 0 | 28 |
| Mustangs | 3 | 0 | 7 | 0 | 10 |

=== At Idaho State ===
| | 1 | 2 | 3 | 4 | Total |
|---|---|---|---|---|---|
| Mustangs | 0 | 17 | 14 | 3 | 34 |
| Bengals | 10 | 7 | 7 | 14 | 38 |

=== At Southern Utah ===
| | 1 | 2 | 3 | 4 | Total |
|---|---|---|---|---|---|
| Mustangs | 7 | 0 | 0 | 7 | 14 |
| Thunderbirds | 10 | 7 | 0 | 3 | 20 |

=== Weber State ===
| | 1 | 2 | 3 | 4 | Total |
|---|---|---|---|---|---|
| No. 23 Wildcats | 8 | 0 | 3 | 6 | 17 |
| Mustangs | 0 | 3 | 0 | 0 | 3 |

=== At UC Davis ===
| | 1 | 2 | 3 | 4 | Total |
|---|---|---|---|---|---|
| Mustangs | 7 | 7 | 7 | 7 | 28 |
| Aggies | 21 | 10 | 0 | 0 | 31 |

=== Portland State ===
| | 1 | 2 | 3 | 4 | Total |
|---|---|---|---|---|---|
| Vikings | 14 | 7 | 7 | 0 | 28 |
| Mustangs | 7 | 14 | 7 | 7 | 35 |

=== Sacramento State ===
| | 1 | 2 | 3 | 4 | Total |
|---|---|---|---|---|---|
| Hornets | 14 | 14 | 21 | 0 | 49 |
| Mustangs | 0 | 0 | 0 | 14 | 14 |

=== At Northern Colorado ===
| | 1 | 2 | 3 | 4 | Total |
|---|---|---|---|---|---|
| Mustangs | 0 | 0 | 0 | 0 | 0 |
| Bears | 0 | 21 | 21 | 0 | 42 |
