= 2017 Northern Arizona Lumberjacks football team =

American college football season

2017 Northern Arizona Lumberjacks football

NCAA Division I First Round, L 10–41 vs. San Diego
- Conference: Big Sky Conference
- Record: 7–5 (6–2 Big Sky)
- Head coach: Jerome Souers (20th season)
- Offensive coordinator: Brian Sheppard (1st season)
- Defensive coordinator: Andy Thompson (9th season)
- Home stadium: Walkup Skydome

2017 Big Sky Conference football standings
	Conf.			Overall
Team	W		L	W		L
No. 14 Southern Utah +^	7	–	1	9	–	3
No. 5 Weber State +^	7	–	1	11	–	3
Northern Arizona ^	6	–	2	7	–	5
No. 21 Eastern Washington	6	–	2	7	–	4
Sacramento State	6	–	2	7	–	4
Montana	5	–	3	7	–	4
Montana State	5	–	3	5	–	6
UC Davis	3	–	5	5	–	6
Idaho State	2	–	6	4	–	7
Northern Colorado	2	–	6	3	–	7
North Dakota	2	–	6	3	–	8
Cal Poly	1	–	7	1	–	10
Portland State	0	–	8	0	–	11
$ – Conference champion; ^ – FCS playoff participant; Rankings from STATS Poll

The 2017 Northern Arizona Lumberjacks football team represented Northern Arizona University in the 2017 NCAA Division I FCS football season. They were led by 20th-year head coach Jerome Souers and played their home games at the Walkup Skydome. They were a member of the Big Sky Conference. They finished the season 7–5, 6–2 in Big Sky play to finish in a three-way tie for third place. They received an at-large bid into the FCS Playoffs where they were lost to San Diego in the first round.

== Schedule ==
Date	Time	Opponent	Rank	Site	TV	Result	Attendance
September 2	8:00 p.m.	at Arizona*		Arizona Stadium; Tucson, AZ	P12N	L 24–62	43,620
September 9	4:00 p.m.	No. 22 Western Illinois*		Walkup Skydome; Flagstaff, AZ	FCSP, FSAZ+, Pluto TV	L 20–38	9,053
September 23	6:00 p.m.	at Cal Poly		Alex G. Spanos Stadium; San Luis Obispo, CA	ELVN	W 28–10	7,726
September 30	4:00 p.m.	Northern Colorado		Walkup Skydome; Flagstaff, AZ	KASW, NAU-TV	W 48–20	5,107
October 7	4:00 p.m.	No. 11 Illinois State*		Walkup Skydome; Flagstaff, AZ	FCSP, FSAZ+, Pluto TV	W 37–16	10,420
October 14	2:00 p.m.	at Portland State		Providence Park; Portland, OR	Pluto TV	W 42–20	4,430
October 21	4:00 p.m.	UC Davis		Walkup Skydome; Flagstaff, AZ	KASW, NAU-TV	W 45–31	5,093
October 28	4:00 p.m.	Sacramento State^{†}		Walkup Skydome; Flagstaff, AZ	KASW, NAU-TV	W 37–17	6,068
November 4	2:30 p.m.	at Montana	No. 18	Washington–Grizzly Stadium; Missoula, MT	RTNW	L 15–17	22,747
November 11	5:00 p.m.	Montana State	No. 24	Walkup Skydome; Flagstaff, AZ	ELVN	W 37–36	6,187
November 18	2:30 p.m.	at No. 14 Southern Utah	No. 23	Eccles Coliseum; Cedar City, UT (Grand Canyon Rivalry)	ELVN	L 20–48	10,842
November 25	6:00 p.m.	San Diego*	No. 25	Walkup Skydome; Flagstaff, AZ (NCAA Division I First Round)	ESPN3	L 10–41	4,068
*Non-conference game; ^{†}Homecoming; Rankings from STATS Poll released prior to the game; All times are in Mountain time

== Game summaries ==
=== At Arizona ===
	1	2	3	4	Total
Lumberjacks	7	7	0	10	24
Wildcats	14	20	14	14	62

=== Western Illinois ===
	1	2	3	4	Total
No. 22 Leathernecks	7	10	14	7	38
Lumberjacks	0	7	6	7	20

=== At Cal Poly ===
	1	2	3	4	Total
Lumberjacks	7	7	14	0	28
Mustangs	3	0	7	0	10

=== Northern Colorado ===
	1	2	3	4	Total
Bears	0	7	13	0	20
Lumberjacks	7	13	14	14	48

=== Illinois State ===
	1	2	3	4	Total
No. 11 Redbirds	0	6	3	7	16
Lumberjacks	0	13	14	10	37

=== At Portland State ===
	1	2	3	4	Total
Lumberjacks	14	0	14	14	42
Vikings	7	0	6	7	20

=== UC Davis ===
	1	2	3	4	Total
Aggies	7	0	17	7	31
Lumberjacks	0	28	7	10	45

=== Sacramento State ===
	1	2	3	4	Total
Hornets	0	10	7	0	17
Lumberjacks	10	7	6	14	37

=== At Montana ===
	1	2	3	4	Total
No. 18 Lumberjacks	3	6	0	6	15
Grizzlies	7	0	7	3	17

=== Montana State ===
	1	2	3	4	Total
Bobcats	7	9	7	13	36
No. 24 Lumberjacks	3	13	14	7	37

=== At Southern Utah ===
	1	2	3	4	Total
No. 23 Lumberjacks	6	7	0	7	20
No. 14 Thunderbirds	3	24	14	7	48

== FCS Playoffs ==
=== San Diego–First Round ===
	1	2	3	4	Total
Toreros	10	14	10	7	41
No. 25 Lumberjacks	0	10	0	0	10

== Ranking movements ==
Ranking movements Legend: ██ Increase in ranking ██ Decrease in ranking — = Not ranked RV = Received votes
	Week													
Poll	Pre	1	2	3	4	5	6	7	8	9	10	11	12	Final
STATS FCS	RV	RV	RV	—	RV	RV	RV	RV	RV	18	24	23	25	RV
Coaches	RV	RV	—	—	—	RV	24	22	24	16	24	23	RV	RV
