= 2017 North Dakota Fighting Hawks football team =

American college football season

2017 North Dakota Fighting Hawks football
- Conference: Big Sky Conference
- Record: 3–8 (2–6 Big Sky)
- Head coach: Bubba Schweigert (4th season)
- Offensive coordinator: Paul Rudolph (4th season)
- Offensive scheme: Pistol
- Defensive coordinator: Eric Schmidt (4th season)
- Base defense: 3–4
- Home stadium: Alerus Center

2017 Big Sky Conference football standings
	Conf.			Overall
Team	W		L	W		L
No. 14 Southern Utah +^	7	–	1	9	–	3
No. 5 Weber State +^	7	–	1	11	–	3
Northern Arizona ^	6	–	2	7	–	5
No. 21 Eastern Washington	6	–	2	7	–	4
Sacramento State	6	–	2	7	–	4
Montana	5	–	3	7	–	4
Montana State	5	–	3	5	–	6
UC Davis	3	–	5	5	–	6
Idaho State	2	–	6	4	–	7
Northern Colorado	2	–	6	3	–	7
North Dakota	2	–	6	3	–	8
Cal Poly	1	–	7	1	–	10
Portland State	0	–	8	0	–	11
$ – Conference champion; ^ – FCS playoff participant; Rankings from STATS Poll

The 2017 North Dakota Fighting Hawks football team represented the University of North Dakota during the 2017 NCAA Division I FCS football season. They were led by fourth-year head coach Bubba Schweigert and played their home games at the Alerus Center. The Fighting Hawks were a member of the Big Sky Conference. They finished the season 3–8, 2–6 in Big Sky play to finish in a three-way tie for 9th place.

This was North Dakota's final year as a full member of the Big Sky. While most of the school's athletic programs will move to the Summit League in 2018, the football program will be classified as an FCS independent in 2018 and 2019 before joining the Missouri Valley Football Conference in 2020. Their games against Big Sky members will still count in the Big Sky standings but they will be ineligible for the Big Sky championship.

== Schedule ==
Date	Time	Opponent	Rank	Site	TV	Result	Attendance
August 31	6:30 p.m.	at Utah*	No. 8	Rice–Eccles Stadium; Salt Lake City, UT	P12N	L 16–37	45,905
September 9	4:00 p.m.	Missouri State*	No. 11	Alerus Center; Grand Forks, ND (Potato Bowl)	Midco	W 34–0	12,047
September 16	2:00 p.m.	at No. 23 South Dakota*	No. 10	DakotaDome; Vermillion, SD (Sitting Bull Trophy)	Midco	L 7–45	9,645
September 23	2:30 p.m.	Montana State	No. 17	Alerus Center; Grand Forks, ND	Midco	L 21–49	12,342
September 30	8:00 p.m.	at UC Davis		Aggie Stadium; Davis, CA	ELVN	L 24–48	9,508
October 7	2:30 p.m.	Northern Colorado		Alerus Center; Grand Forks, ND	Midco	W 48–38	10,234
October 14	2:00 p.m.	at No. 24 Montana		Washington–Grizzly Stadium; Missoula, MT	RTNW	L 17–41	25,085
October 21	12:30 p.m.	Sacramento State		Alerus Center; Grand Forks, ND	Midco	L 27–34	9,259
October 28	6:00 p.m.	at Portland State		Providence Park; Portland, OR	ELVN	W 48–21	3,002
November 4	7:00 p.m.	at No. 17 Southern Utah		Eccles Coliseum; Cedar City, UT	Pluto TV	L 21–47	7,641
November 11	1:00 p.m.	No. 19 Eastern Washington		Alerus Center; Grand Forks, ND	Midco	L 14–21	8,247
*Non-conference game; Rankings from STATS Poll released prior to the game; All times are in Central time

== Game summaries ==
=== At Utah ===
	1	2	3	4	Total
No. 8 Fighting Hawks	3	6	0	7	16
Utes	0	17	10	10	37

=== Missouri State ===
	1	2	3	4	Total
Bears	0	0	0	0	0
No. 11 Fighting Hawks	3	21	0	10	34

=== At South Dakota ===
	1	2	3	4	Total
No. 10 Fighting Hawks	0	0	7	0	7
No. 23 Coyotes	17	14	7	7	45

=== Montana State ===
	1	2	3	4	Total
Bobcats	7	21	7	14	49
No. 17 Fighting Hawks	0	10	11	0	21

=== At UC Davis ===
	1	2	3	4	Total
Fighting Hawks	10	7	0	7	24
Aggies	21	17	3	7	48

=== Northern Colorado ===
	1	2	3	4	Total
Bears	7	17	14	0	38
Fighting Hawks	14	14	10	10	48

=== At Montana ===
	1	2	3	4	Total
Fighting Hawks	0	3	7	7	17
No. 24 Grizzlies	7	13	14	7	41

=== Sacramento State ===
	1	2	3	4	Total
Hornets	3	7	24	0	34
Fighting Hawks	0	10	7	10	27

=== At Portland State ===
	1	2	3	4	Total
Fighting Hawks	0	13	21	14	48
Vikings	14	0	0	7	21

=== At Southern Utah ===
	1	2	3	4	Total
Fighting Hawks	7	7	7	0	21
No. 17 Thunderbirds	13	14	13	7	47

=== Eastern Washington ===
	1	2	3	4	Total
No. 19 Eagles	7	14	0	0	21
Fighting Hawks	7	0	0	7	14

== Ranking movements ==
Ranking movements Legend: ██ Increase in ranking ██ Decrease in ranking — = Not ranked RV = Received votes
	Week													
Poll	Pre	1	2	3	4	5	6	7	8	9	10	11	12	Final
STATS FCS	8	11	10	17	RV	—	—	—	—	—	—	—	—	—
Coaches	10	11	10	19	RV	RV	—	—	—	—	—	—	—	—
