= 2017 Montana Grizzlies football team =

American college football season

2017 Montana Grizzlies football
- Conference: Big Sky Conference
- Record: 7–4 (5–3 Big Sky)
- Head coach: Bob Stitt (3rd season)
- Offensive coordinator: Bob Stitt (3rd season)
- Defensive coordinator: Jason Semore (2nd season)
- Home stadium: Washington–Grizzly Stadium

2017 Big Sky Conference football standings
	Conf.			Overall
Team	W		L	W		L
No. 14 Southern Utah +^	7	–	1	9	–	3
No. 5 Weber State +^	7	–	1	11	–	3
Northern Arizona ^	6	–	2	7	–	5
No. 21 Eastern Washington	6	–	2	7	–	4
Sacramento State	6	–	2	7	–	4
Montana	5	–	3	7	–	4
Montana State	5	–	3	5	–	6
UC Davis	3	–	5	5	–	6
Idaho State	2	–	6	4	–	7
Northern Colorado	2	–	6	3	–	7
North Dakota	2	–	6	3	–	8
Cal Poly	1	–	7	1	–	10
Portland State	0	–	8	0	–	11
$ – Conference champion; ^ – FCS playoff participant; Rankings from STATS Poll

The 2017 Montana Grizzlies football team represented the University of Montana in the 2017 NCAA Division I FCS football season. The Grizzlies were led by third-year coach Bob Stitt and played their home games on campus at Washington–Grizzly Stadium in Missoula, Montana as a charter member of the Big Sky Conference. They finished the season 7–4, 5–3 in Big Sky play to finish in a tie for sixth place.

On November 20, it was announced that head coach Bob Stitt's contract would not be renewed. He finished at Montana with a three-year record of 21–14.

== Schedule ==
Date	Time	Opponent	Rank	Site	TV	Result	Attendance
September 2	1:00 p.m.	Valparaiso*		Washington–Grizzly Stadium; Missoula, MT	SWX MT	W 45–23	23,160
September 9	6:00 p.m.	at No. 7 (FBS) Washington*		Husky Stadium; Seattle, WA	P12N	L 7–63	68,491
September 16	1:00 p.m.	Savannah State*		Washington–Grizzly Stadium; Missoula, MT	SWX MT	W 56–3	22,228
September 23	6:00 p.m.	No. 11 Eastern Washington		Washington–Grizzly Stadium; Missoula, MT (Governors Cup)	RTNW	L 41–48	25,944
September 30	3:00 p.m.	at Portland State		Hillsboro Stadium; Hillsboro, OR	SWX MT	W 45–33	5,012
October 7	2:30 p.m.	at Idaho State		Holt Arena; Pocatello, ID	ELVN	W 39–31	7,279
October 14	1:00 p.m.	North Dakota^{†}	No. 24	Washington–Grizzly Stadium; Missoula, MT	RTNW	W 41–17	25,085
October 28	2:00 p.m.	at Weber State	No. 24	Stewart Stadium; Ogden, UT	SWX MT	L 27–41	8,912
November 4	3:30 p.m.	No. 18 Northern Arizona		Washington–Grizzly Stadium; Missoula, MT	RTNW	W 17–15	22,747
November 11	1:00 p.m.	Northern Colorado		Washington–Grizzly Stadium; Missoula, MT	RTNW	W 44–14	22,048
November 18	Noon	at Montana State		Bobcat Stadium; Bozeman, MT (rivalry)	RTNW	L 23–31	19,907
*Non-conference game; ^{†}Homecoming; Rankings from STATS Poll released prior to the game; All times are in Mountain time

== Game summaries ==
=== Valparaiso ===
	1	2	3	4	Total
Crusaders	6	7	0	10	23
Grizzlies	10	7	7	21	45

=== @ Washington ===
	1	2	3	4	Total
Grizzlies	7	0	0	0	7
No. 7 (FBS) Huskies	21	14	14	14	63

=== Savannah State ===
	1	2	3	4	Total
Tigers	0	3	0	0	3
Grizzlies	14	21	14	7	56

=== Eastern Washington ===
	1	2	3	4	Total
No. 11 Eagles	3	3	21	21	48
Grizzlies	14	10	3	14	41

=== @ Portland State ===
	1	2	3	4	Total
Grizzlies	10	17	13	5	45
Vikings	7	7	7	12	33

=== @ Idaho State ===
	1	2	3	4	Total
Grizzlies	7	6	19	7	39
Bengals	7	14	7	3	31

=== North Dakota ===
	1	2	3	4	Total
Fighting Hawks	0	3	7	7	17
No. 24 Grizzlies	7	13	14	7	41

=== @ Weber State ===
	1	2	3	4	Total
No. 24 Grizzlies	0	6	7	14	27
Wildcats	10	24	0	7	41

=== Northern Arizona ===
	1	2	3	4	Total
No. 18 Lumberjacks	3	6	0	6	15
Grizzlies	7	0	7	3	17

=== Northern Colorado ===
	1	2	3	4	Total
Bears	7	0	0	7	14
Grizzlies	14	23	7	0	44

=== @ Montana State ===
	1	2	3	4	Total
Grizzlies	3	10	0	10	23
Bobcats	0	21	3	7	31

== Ranking movements ==
Ranking movements Legend: ██ Increase in ranking ██ Decrease in ranking RV = Received votes
	Week													
Poll	Pre	1	2	3	4	5	6	7	8	9	10	11	12	Final
STATS FCS	RV	RV	RV	RV	RV	RV	24	21	24	RV	RV	RV	RV	
Coaches	RV	RV	RV	RV	RV	RV	RV	25	RV	RV	RV	RV	RV	
