= 2017 Southern Utah Thunderbirds football team =

American college football season

2017 Southern Utah Thunderbirds football

Big Sky co-champion

FCS Playoffs Second Round, L 13–30 vs. Weber State
- Conference: Big Sky Conference

Ranking
- STATS: No. 14
- FCS Coaches: No. 13
- Record: 9–3 (7–1 Big Sky)
- Head coach: Demario Warren (2nd season)
- Offensive coordinator: Justin Walterscheid (2nd season)
- Defensive coordinator: Rod Chance (2nd season)
- Home stadium: Eccles Coliseum

2017 Big Sky Conference football standings
	Conf.			Overall
Team	W		L	W		L
No. 14 Southern Utah +^	7	–	1	9	–	3
No. 5 Weber State +^	7	–	1	11	–	3
Northern Arizona ^	6	–	2	7	–	5
No. 21 Eastern Washington	6	–	2	7	–	4
Sacramento State	6	–	2	7	–	4
Montana	5	–	3	7	–	4
Montana State	5	–	3	5	–	6
UC Davis	3	–	5	5	–	6
Idaho State	2	–	6	4	–	7
Northern Colorado	2	–	6	3	–	7
North Dakota	2	–	6	3	–	8
Cal Poly	1	–	7	1	–	10
Portland State	0	–	8	0	–	11
$ – Conference champion; ^ – FCS playoff participant; Rankings from STATS Poll

The 2017 Southern Utah Thunderbirds football team represented Southern Utah University in the 2017 NCAA Division I FCS football season. They were led by second-year head coach Demario Warren and played their home games at Eccles Coliseum in Cedar City, Utah as sixth-year as members of the Big Sky Conference. They finished the season 9–3, 7–1 in Big Sky play to earn a share of the conference championship with Weber State. They received the conference's automatic bid to the FCS Playoffs where they lost to Weber State in the second round.

== Schedule ==
Date	Time	Opponent	Rank	Site	TV	Result	Attendance
September 2	6:15 p.m.	at Oregon*		Autzen Stadium; Eugene, OR	P12N	L 21–77	52,204
September 9	5:00 p.m.	at Stephen F. Austin*		Homer Bryce Stadium; Nacogdoches, TX	ESPN3	W 51–14	12,324
September 16	6:00 p.m.	No. 21 Northern Iowa*		Eccles Coliseum; Cedar City, UT	Pluto TV	W 24–21	8,841
September 23	7:00 p.m.	at Sacramento State		Hornet Stadium; Sacramento, CA	Pluto TV	L 27–54	7,272
October 7	6:00 p.m.	Cal Poly^{†}		Eccles Coliseum; Cedar City, UT	Pluto TV	W 20–14	10,633
October 14	6:00 p.m.	at No. 18 Weber State		Stewart Stadium; Ogden, UT (Beehive Bowl)	ELVN	W 32–16	9,135
October 21	5:00 p.m.	No. 8 Eastern Washington		Eccles Coliseum; Cedar City, UT	ELVN	W 46–28	7,463
October 28	12:30 p.m.	at Northern Colorado	No. 25	Nottingham Field; Greeley, CO	CET	W 27–14	3,869
November 4	6:00 p.m.	North Dakota	No. 17	Eccles Coliseum; Cedar City, UT	Pluto TV	W 47–21	7,641
November 11	5:00 p.m.	at UC Davis	No. 15	Aggie Stadium; Davis, CA	Pluto TV	W 47–27	6,715
November 18	2:30 p.m.	No. 23 Northern Arizona	No. 14	Eccles Coliseum; Cedar City, UT (Grand Canyon Rivalry)	ELVN	W 48–20	10,842
December 2	6:00 p.m.	No. 11 Weber State*	No. 12	Eccles Coliseum; Cedar City, UT (NCAA Division I Second Round)	ESPN3	L 13–30	11,811
*Non-conference game; ^{†}Homecoming; Rankings from STATS Poll released prior to the game; All times are in Mountain time

== Game summaries ==
=== At Oregon ===
	1	2	3	4	Total
Thunderbirds	7	14	0	0	21
Ducks	21	21	21	14	77

=== At Stephen F. Austin ===
	1	2	3	4	Total
Thunderbirds	7	24	10	10	51
Lumberjacks	0	0	14	0	14

=== Northern Iowa ===
	1	2	3	4	Total
No. 21 Panthers	0	7	3	11	21
Thunderbirds	7	7	7	3	24

=== At Sacramento State ===
	1	2	3	4	Total
Thunderbirds	7	7	0	13	27
Hornets	7	23	10	14	54

=== Cal Poly ===
	1	2	3	4	Total
Mustangs	7	0	0	7	14
Thunderbirds	10	7	0	3	20

=== At Weber State ===
	1	2	3	4	Total
Thunderbirds	7	13	9	3	32
No. 18 Wildcats	3	10	3	0	16

=== Eastern Washington ===
	1	2	3	4	Total
No. 8 Eagles	14	7	0	7	28
Thunderbirds	0	15	10	21	46

=== At Northern Colorado ===
	1	2	3	4	Total
No. 25 Thunderbirds	13	7	7	0	27
Bears	0	7	7	0	14

=== North Dakota ===
	1	2	3	4	Total
Fighting Hawks	7	7	7	0	21
No. 17 Thunderbirds	13	14	13	7	47

=== At UC Davis ===
	1	2	3	4	Total
No. 15 Thunderbirds	14	12	14	7	47
Aggies	0	7	7	13	27

=== Northern Arizona ===
	1	2	3	4	Total
No. 23 Lumberjacks	6	7	0	7	20
No. 14 Thunderbirds	3	24	14	7	48

== FCS Playoffs ==
=== Weber State–Second Round ===
	1	2	3	4	Total
No. 11 Wildcats	0	13	14	3	30
No. 12 Thunderbirds	10	3	0	0	13

== Ranking movements ==
Ranking movements Legend: ██ Increase in ranking ██ Decrease in ranking — = Not ranked RV = Received votes
	Week													
Poll	Pre	1	2	3	4	5	6	7	8	9	10	11	12	Final
STATS FCS	RV	—	RV	RV	—	—	—	RV	25	17	15	14	12	14
Coaches	RV	—	—	—	—	—	—	—	RV	23	19	18	13	13
