= 2017 Weber State Wildcats football team =

American college football season

2017 Weber State Wildcats football

Big Sky co-champion

FCS Playoffs Quarterfinals, L 28–31 vs. James Madison
- Conference: Big Sky Conference

Ranking
- STATS: No. 5
- FCS Coaches: No. 5
- Record: 11–3 (7–1 Big Sky)
- Head coach: Jay Hill (4th season)
- Offensive coordinator: Fesi Sitake (2nd season)
- Defensive coordinator: Jason Kaufusi (2nd season)
- Home stadium: Stewart Stadium

2017 Big Sky Conference football standings
	Conf.			Overall
Team	W		L	W		L
No. 14 Southern Utah +^	7	–	1	9	–	3
No. 5 Weber State +^	7	–	1	11	–	3
Northern Arizona ^	6	–	2	7	–	5
No. 21 Eastern Washington	6	–	2	7	–	4
Sacramento State	6	–	2	7	–	4
Montana	5	–	3	7	–	4
Montana State	5	–	3	5	–	6
UC Davis	3	–	5	5	–	6
Idaho State	2	–	6	4	–	7
Northern Colorado	2	–	6	3	–	7
North Dakota	2	–	6	3	–	8
Cal Poly	1	–	7	1	–	10
Portland State	0	–	8	0	–	11
$ – Conference champion; ^ – FCS playoff participant; Rankings from STATS Poll

The 2017 Weber State Wildcats football team represented Weber State University in the 2017 NCAA Division I FCS football season. The Wildcats were led by fourth-year head coach Jay Hill and played their games at Stewart Stadium as members of the Big Sky Conference. They finished the season 11–3, 7–1 in Big Sky play to finish in a tie for the Big Sky championship with Southern Utah. Due to their head-to-head loss to Southern Utah in the regular season, they did not receive the Big Sky's automatic bid to the FCS Playoffs, but did receive an at-large bid to the FCS Playoffs, their second straight trip to the playoffs. In the first round, they defeated Western Illinois. In the second round, they avenged their regular season loss to Southern Utah. In the quarterfinals, they lost to eventual national runner-up, James Madison.

== Schedule ==
Date	Time	Opponent	Rank	Site	TV	Result	Attendance
September 2	6:00 p.m.	Montana Western*		Stewart Stadium; Ogden, UT	Pluto TV	W 76–0	8,882
September 9	3:00 p.m.	at California*	No. 25	California Memorial Stadium; Berkeley, CA	P12N	L 20–33	36,209
September 16	7:00 p.m.	at Sacramento State*		Hornet Stadium; Sacramento, CA	Pluto TV	W 31–24	8,365
September 23	5:00 p.m.	UC Davis^{†}	No. 23	Stewart Stadium; Ogden, UT	KJZZ	W 41–3	9,450
September 30	1:30 p.m.	at Montana State	No. 20	Bobcat Stadium; Bozeman, MT	ATTRM	W 25–17	19,557
October 14	6:00 p.m.	Southern Utah	No. 18	Stewart Stadium; Ogden, UT (Beehive Bowl)	ELVN	L 16–32	9,135
October 21	1:30 p.m.	at Cal Poly	No. 23	Alex G. Spanos Stadium; San Luis Obispo, CA	Pluto TV	W 17–3	9,234
October 28	2:00 p.m.	No. 24 Montana		Stewart Stadium; Ogden, UT	KJZZ	W 41–27	8,912
November 4	2:00 p.m.	at No. 11 Eastern Washington	No. 19	Roos Field; Cheney, WA	Pluto TV	W 28–20	9,451
November 11	3:00 p.m.	at Portland State	No. 14	Providence Park; Portland, OR	Pluto TV	W 63–17	3,792
November 18	2:00 p.m.	Idaho State	No. 12	Stewart Stadium; Ogden, UT	Pluto TV	W 35–7	9,539
November 25	2:00 p.m.	No. 9 Western Illinois*	No. 11	Stewart Stadium; Ogden, UT (NCAA Division I First Round)	ESPN3	W 21–19	16,876
December 2	6:00 p.m.	at No. 12 Southern Utah*	No. 11	Eccles Coliseum; Cedar City, UT (NCAA Division I Second Round)	ESPN3	W 30–13	11,811
December 8	5:00 p.m.	at No. 1 James Madison*	No. 11	Bridgeforth Stadium; Harrisonburg, VA (NCAA Division I Quarterfinal)	ESPN2	L 28–31	13,497
*Non-conference game; ^{†}Homecoming; Rankings from STATS Poll released prior to the game; All times are in Mountain time

Despite also being a member of the Big Sky Conference, the game with Sacramento State on September 16 was considered a non-conference game.

== Game summaries ==
=== Montana Western ===
	1	2	3	4	Total
Bulldogs	0	0	0	0	0
Wildcats	20	28	14	14	76

=== At California ===
	1	2	3	4	Total
No. 25 Wildcats	10	10	0	0	20
Golden Bears	7	10	0	16	33

=== At Sacramento State ===
	1	2	3	4	Total
Wildcats	16	8	0	7	31
Hornets	0	14	7	3	24

=== UC Davis ===
	1	2	3	4	Total
Aggies	3	0	0	0	3
No. 23 Wildcats	17	14	10	0	41

=== At Montana State ===
	1	2	3	4	Total
No. 20 Wildcats	0	9	13	3	25
Bobcats	3	7	0	7	17

=== Southern Utah ===
	1	2	3	4	Total
Thunderbirds	7	13	9	3	32
No. 18 Wildcats	3	10	3	0	16

=== At Cal Poly ===
	1	2	3	4	Total
No. 23 Wildcats	8	0	3	6	17
Mustangs	0	3	0	0	3

=== Montana ===
	1	2	3	4	Total
No. 24 Grizzlies	0	6	7	14	27
Wildcats	10	24	0	7	41

=== At Eastern Washington ===
	1	2	3	4	Total
No. 19 Wildcats	0	14	7	7	28
No. 11 Eagles	7	7	0	6	20

=== At Portland State ===
	1	2	3	4	Total
No. 14 Wildcats	14	35	7	7	63
Vikings	3	0	7	7	17

=== Idaho State ===
	1	2	3	4	Total
Bengals	7	0	0	0	7
No. 12 Wildcats	7	14	7	7	35

== FCS Playoffs ==
=== Western Illinois–First Round ===
	1	2	3	4	Total
No. 9 Leathernecks	3	3	6	7	19
No. 11 Wildcats	0	14	0	7	21

=== At Southern Utah–Second Round ===
	1	2	3	4	Total
No. 11 Wildcats	0	13	14	3	30
No. 12 Thunderbirds	10	3	0	0	13

=== At James Madison–Quarterfinals ===
	1	2	3	4	Total
No. 11 Wildcats	7	0	7	14	28
No. 1 Dukes	7	3	0	21	31

== Ranking movements ==
Ranking movements Legend: ██ Increase in ranking ██ Decrease in ranking RV = Received votes
	Week													
Poll	Pre	1	2	3	4	5	6	7	8	9	10	11	12	Final
STATS FCS	RV	25	RV	23	20	19	18	23	RV	19	14	12	11	5
Coaches	22	20	21	18	18	16	16	23	22	14	12	9	8	5
