= 2017 Eastern Washington Eagles football team =

American college football season

2017 Eastern Washington Eagles football
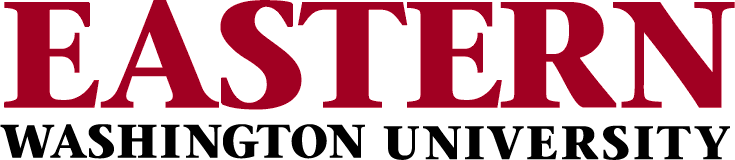
- Conference: Big Sky Conference

Ranking
- STATS: No. 21
- FCS Coaches: No. 22
- Record: 7–4 (6–2 Big Sky)
- Head coach: Aaron Best (1st season)
- Offensive coordinator: Bodie Reeder (1st season)
- Offensive scheme: Multiple
- Defensive coordinator: Jeff Schmedding (3rd season)
- Base defense: 4–2–5
- Home stadium: Roos Field

2017 Big Sky Conference football standings
	Conf.			Overall
Team	W		L	W		L
No. 14 Southern Utah +^	7	–	1	9	–	3
No. 5 Weber State +^	7	–	1	11	–	3
Northern Arizona ^	6	–	2	7	–	5
No. 21 Eastern Washington	6	–	2	7	–	4
Sacramento State	6	–	2	7	–	4
Montana	5	–	3	7	–	4
Montana State	5	–	3	5	–	6
UC Davis	3	–	5	5	–	6
Idaho State	2	–	6	4	–	7
Northern Colorado	2	–	6	3	–	7
North Dakota	2	–	6	3	–	8
Cal Poly	1	–	7	1	–	10
Portland State	0	–	8	0	–	11
$ – Conference champion; ^ – FCS playoff participant; Rankings from STATS Poll

The 2017 Eastern Washington Eagles football team represented Eastern Washington University in the 2017 NCAA Division I FCS football season. The team was coached by first-year head coach Aaron Best, who was promoted from Offensive Line coach. The Eagles played their home games at Roos Field in Cheney, Washington and were a member of the Big Sky Conference. They finished the season 7–4, 6–2 in Big Sky play to finish in a three-way tie for third place. Despite being ranked in the top 25 at the end of the regular season, they were not selected to participate in the FCS Playoffs.

== Schedule ==
Date	Time	Opponent	Rank	Site	TV	Result	Attendance
September 2	1:00 p.m.	at Texas Tech*	No. 5	Jones AT&T Stadium; Lubbock, TX	RTNW	L 10–56	54,988
September 9	1:05 p.m.	No. 2 North Dakota State*	No. 7	Roos Field; Cheney, WA	ESPN3	L 13–40	10,231
September 16	10:00 a.m.	at Fordham*	No. 12	Coffey Field; Bronx, NY	STADIUM	W 56–21	3,029
September 23	5:05 p.m.	at Montana	No. 11	Washington–Grizzly Stadium; Missoula, MT (EWU–UM Governors Cup)	RTNW	W 48–41	25,944
September 30	1:05 p.m.	Sacramento State	No. 9	Roos Field; Cheney, WA	SWX WA	W 52–31	10,917
October 7	6:00 p.m.	at UC Davis	No. 10	Aggie Stadium; Davis, CA	Pluto TV	W 41–38	8,158
October 14	1:05 p.m.	Montana State	No. 10	Roos Field; Cheney, WA	SWX WA	W 31–19	11,301
October 21	4:00 p.m.	at Southern Utah	No. 8	Eccles Coliseum; Cedar City, UT	ELVN	L 28–46	7,463
November 4	1:05 p.m.	No. 19 Weber State^{†}	No. 11	Roos Field; Cheney, WA	SWX WA	L 20–28	9,451
November 11	11:05 a.m.	at North Dakota	No. 19	Alerus Center; Grand Forks, ND	Midco	W 21–14	8,247
November 18	3:05 p.m.	Portland State	No. 18	Roos Field; Cheney, WA (The Dam Cup)	RTNW	W 59–33	8,717
*Non-conference game; ^{†}Homecoming; Rankings from STATS Poll released prior to the game; All times are in Pacific time

== Game summaries ==
=== At Texas Tech ===
	1	2	3	4	Total
No. 5 Eagles	0	10	0	0	10
Red Raiders	7	21	21	7	56

=== North Dakota State ===
	1	2	3	4	Total
No. 2 Bison	9	10	7	14	40
No. 7 Eagles	7	3	3	0	13

=== At Fordham ===
	1	2	3	4	Total
No. 12 Eagles	7	14	21	14	56
Rams	7	0	7	7	21

=== At Montana ===
	1	2	3	4	Total
No. 11 Eagles	3	3	21	21	48
Grizzlies	14	10	3	14	41

=== Sacramento State ===
	1	2	3	4	Total
Hornets	7	10	7	7	31
No. 9 Eagles	21	7	14	10	52

=== At UC Davis ===
	1	2	3	4	Total
No. 10 Eagles	6	7	7	21	41
Aggies	7	7	14	10	38

=== Montana State ===
	1	2	3	4	Total
Bobcats	0	7	0	12	19
No. 10 Eagles	7	10	7	7	31

=== At Southern Utah ===
	1	2	3	4	Total
No. 8 Eagles	14	7	0	7	28
Thunderbirds	0	15	10	21	46

=== Weber State ===
	1	2	3	4	Total
No. 19 Wildcats	0	14	7	7	28
No. 11 Eagles	7	7	0	6	20

=== At North Dakota ===
	1	2	3	4	Total
No. 19 Eagles	7	14	0	0	21
Fighting Hawks	7	0	0	7	14

=== Portland State ===
	1	2	3	4	Total
Vikings	14	12	0	7	33
No. 18 Eagles	14	17	28	0	59

== Ranking movements ==
Ranking movements Legend: ██ Increase in ranking ██ Decrease in ranking т = Tied with team above or below
	Week													
Poll	Pre	1	2	3	4	5	6	7	8	9	10	11	12	Final
STATS	5	7	12	11	9	10	10	8	14	11	19	18	17	21
Coaches	4	6–T	12	11	8–T	10	9	8	12	11	21	20	19	22
