= 2017 NCAA Division I FCS football rankings =

- Season: 2017
- Duration: August 2017 – January 2018
- Preseason No. 1: James Madison
- National Champions: North Dakota State

The 2017 National Collegiate Athletic Association (NCAA) Division I Football Championship Subdivision (FCS) football rankings comprises two human polls, in addition to various publications' preseason polls. Unlike the Football Bowl Subdivision (FBS), college football's governing body, the NCAA, bestows the national championship title through a 24-team tournament. The following weekly polls determine the top 25 teams at the NCAA Division I Football Championship Subdivision level of college football for the 2017 season. The STATS poll is voted by media members while the Coaches' Poll is determined by coaches at the FCS level.

== Legend ==
Legend
	Increase in ranking
	Decrease in ranking
	Not ranked previous week
Italics	Number of first place votes
(#–#)	Win–loss record
т	Tied with team above or below also with this symbol

== STATS Poll ==
	Preseason Aug 7	Week 1 Sep 4	Week 2 Sep 11	Week 3 Sep 18	Week 4 Sep 25	Week 5 Oct 2	Week 6 Oct 9	Week 7 Oct 16	Week 8 Oct 23	Week 9 Oct 30	Week 10 Nov 6	Week 11 Nov 13	Week 12 Nov 19	Week 13 (Final) Jan 8	
1.	James Madison 134	James Madison 152 (1–0)	James Madison 148 (2–0)	James Madison 156 (3–0)	James Madison 154 (4–0)	James Madison 157 (5–0)	James Madison 160 (5–0)	James Madison 160 (6–0)	James Madison 157 (7–0)	James Madison 156 (8–0)	James Madison 162 (9–0)	James Madison 163 (10–0)	James Madison 153 (11–0)	North Dakota State 158 (14–1)	1.
2.	North Dakota State 19	North Dakota State 8 (1–0)	North Dakota State 10 (2–0)	North Dakota State 5 (2–0)	North Dakota State 5 (3–0)	North Dakota State 8 (4–0)	North Dakota State 8 (5–0)	North Dakota State 7 (6–0)	North Dakota State 9 (7–0)	North Dakota State 6 (8–0)	Jacksonville State (8–1)	Jacksonville State (9–1)	Jacksonville State (10–1)	James Madison (14–1)	2.
3.	Sam Houston State 7	Sam Houston State 2 (1–0)	Sam Houston State (2–0)	Sam Houston State 1 (2–0)	Sam Houston State 2 (3–0)	Youngstown State (3–1)	Jacksonville State (4–1)	Jacksonville State (5–1)	Jacksonville State (6–1)	Jacksonville State (7–1)	Central Arkansas (8–1)	Central Arkansas (9–1)	Central Arkansas (10–1)	South Dakota State (11–3)	3.
4.	South Dakota State 2	South Dakota State 1 (1–0)	South Dakota State 1 (2–0)	South Dakota State 1 (3–0)	South Dakota State 1 (3–0)	Jacksonville State (3–1)	South Dakota (5–0)	South Dakota (6–0)	Central Arkansas (6–1)	Central Arkansas (7–1)	Sam Houston State (8–1)	North Dakota State (9–1)	North Dakota State (10–1)	Sam Houston State (12–2)	4.
5.	Eastern Washington	Jacksonville State (1–0)	Jacksonville State (1–1)	Jacksonville State (1–1)	Jacksonville State (2–1)	Wofford (4–0)	Wofford (5–0)	Wofford (6–0)	Sam Houston State (6–1)	Sam Houston State (7–1)	North Dakota State (8–1)	Sam Houston State (9–1)	Sam Houston State (10–1)	Weber State (11–3)	5.
6.	Jacksonville State 1	Villanova (1–0)	Youngstown State (1–1)	Youngstown State (2–1)	Youngstown State (2–1)	Central Arkansas (3–1)	Central Arkansas (4–1)	Central Arkansas (5–1)	South Dakota (6–1)	South Dakota (7–1)	South Dakota State (7–2)	South Dakota State (8–2)	South Dakota State (9–2)	Wofford (10–3)	6.
7.	Richmond	Eastern Washington (0–1)	Villanova (1–1)	Villanova (2–1)	Wofford (3–0)	South Dakota (4–0)	South Dakota State (4–1)	Sam Houston State (5–1)	North Carolina A&T (8–0)	Elon (7–1)	Elon (8–1)	Wofford (9–1)	North Carolina A&T (11–0)	North Carolina A&T (12–0)	7.
8.	North Dakota	Youngstown State (0–1)	Richmond (1–1)	Richmond (2–1)	The Citadel (3–0)	South Dakota State (3–1)	Youngstown State (3–2)	Eastern Washington (5–2)	Wofford (6–1)	Wofford (7–1)	Wofford (8–1)	North Carolina A&T (10–0)	Wofford (9–2)	Kennesaw State (12–2)	8.
9.	Youngstown State	Richmond (0–1)	New Hampshire (2–0)	Wofford (2–0)	Eastern Washington (2–2)	Sam Houston State (3–1)	Sam Houston State (4–1)	Youngstown State (3–3)	Samford (5–2)	North Carolina A&T (8–0)	North Carolina A&T (9–0)	Western Illinois (7–3)	Western Illinois (8–3)	Jacksonville State (10–2)	9.
10.	Villanova	Wofford (1–0)	North Dakota (1–1)	The Citadel (3–0)	South Dakota (3–0)	Eastern Washington (3–2)	Eastern Washington (4–2)	Western Illinois (5–1)	Elon (6–1)	South Dakota State (6–2)	South Dakota (7–2)	Stony Brook (8–2)	Stony Brook (9–2)	Central Arkansas (10–2)	10.
11.	Wofford	North Dakota (0–1)	Wofford (2–0)	Eastern Washington (1–2)	Central Arkansas (2–1)	Illinois State (4–0)	Villanova (4–2)	Richmond (4–2)	South Dakota State (5–2)	Eastern Washington (5–3)	Western Illinois (6–3)	Elon (8–2)	Weber State (9–2)	Stony Brook (10–3)	11.
12.	Chattanooga	New Hampshire (1–0)	Eastern Washington (0–2)	Central Arkansas (2–1)	Illinois State (3–0)	Villanova (3–2)	New Hampshire (4–1)	North Carolina A&T (7–0)	Western Illinois (5–2)	Illinois State (6–2)	Stony Brook (7–2)	Weber State (8–2)	Southern Utah (9–2)	New Hampshire (9–5)	12.
13.	New Hampshire	Chattanooga (0–1)	The Citadel (2–0)	South Dakota (3–0)	Western Illinois (3–0)	New Hampshire (4–1)	Richmond (3–2)	South Dakota State (4–2)	Villanova (4–3)	Grambling State (7–1)	Grambling State (8–1)	Grambling State (9–1)	Grambling State (9–1)	Western Illinois (8–4)	13.
14.	Charleston Southern	The Citadel (1–0)	Central Arkansas (1–1)	Illinois State (2–0)	Villanova (2–2)	Richmond (2–2)	Western Illinois (4–1)	Elon (5–1)	Eastern Washington (5–3)	Stony Brook (6–2)	Weber State (7–2)	Southern Utah (8–2)	Samford (8–3)	Southern Utah (9–3)	14.
15.	Central Arkansas	Central Arkansas (0–1)	Chattanooga (0–2)	New Hampshire (2–1)	New Hampshire (3–1)	Western Illinois (3–1)	North Carolina A&T (6–0)	Villanova (4–3)	Grambling State (6–1)	Western Illinois (5–3)	Southern Utah (7–2)	South Dakota (7–3)	Elon (8–3)	South Dakota (8–5)	15.
16.	The Citadel	Charleston Southern (0–1)	Charleston Southern (0–1)	Liberty (3–0)	Richmond (2–2)	North Carolina A&T (5–0)	Elon (5–1)	Samford (4–2)	Illinois State (5–2)	Samford (5–3)	Samford (6–3)	New Hampshire (7–3)	South Dakota (7–4)	Grambling State (11–2)	16.
17.	Lehigh	Samford (1–0)	Samford (2–0)	North Dakota (1–2)	North Carolina A&T (4–0)	The Citadel (3–1)	Illinois State (4–1)	Grambling State (5–1)	New Hampshire (5–2)	Southern Utah (6–2)	Illinois State (6–3)	Samford (7–3)	Eastern Washington (7–4)	Northern Iowa (8–5)	17.
18.	Northern Iowa	Illinois State (1–0)	Illinois State (1–0)	Samford (2–1)	UT Martin (3–1)	Elon (4–1)	Weber State (4–1)	New Hampshire (4–2)	Western Carolina (6–2)	Northern Arizona (6–2)	New Hampshire (6–3)	Eastern Washington (6–4)	Kennesaw State (10–1)	Samford (8–4)	18.
19.	Samford	Lehigh (0–1)	Liberty (2–0)	Western Illinois (2–0)	Albany (3–1)	Weber State (4–1)	Samford (4–2)	Western Carolina (5–2)	Richmond (4–3)	Weber State (6–2)	Eastern Washington (5–4)	McNeese State (8–2)	McNeese State (9–2)	Furman (8–5)	19.
20.	Illinois State	Liberty (1–0)	Western Illinois (2–0)	Tennessee State (3–0)	Weber State (3–1)	Samford (3–2)	Grambling State (5–1)	McNeese State (5–1)	McNeese State (6–1)	Villanova (4–4)	McNeese State (7–2)	Furman (7–3)	Northern Iowa (7–4)	Elon (8–4)	20.
21.	Grambling State	Northern Iowa (0–1)	Northern Iowa (1–1)	North Carolina A&T (3–0)	Grambling State (2–1)	Grambling State (4–1)	Western Carolina (4–2)	Montana (5–2)	Youngstown State (3–4)	New Hampshire (5–3)	Furman (6–3)	Illinois State (6–4)	New Hampshire (7–4)	Eastern Washington (7–4)	21.
22.	Fordham	Western Illinois (1–0)	Tennessee State (2–0)	Grambling State (2–1)	Liberty (3–1)	Western Carolina (4–1)	McNeese State (5–1)	Stony Brook (5–2)	Stony Brook (5–2)	McNeese State (6–2)	Western Carolina (7–3)	Kennesaw State (9–1)	Furman (7–4)	McNeese State (9–2)	22.
23.	Cal Poly	Tennessee State (1–0)	South Dakota (2–0)	Weber State (2–1)	Elon (3–1)	Stony Brook (4–1)	The Citadel (3–2)	Weber State (4–2)	Delaware (5–2)	Furman (6–3)	Kennesaw State (8–1)	Northern Arizona (7–3)	Illinois State (6–5)	San Diego (10–3)	23.
24.	Albany	Grambling State (0–1)	Grambling State (1–1)	UT Martin (2–1)	Tennessee State (3–1)	Albany (3–2)	Montana (4–2)	Illinois State (4–2)	Montana (5–2)	Western Carolina (6–3)	Northern Arizona (6–3)	Northern Iowa (6–4)	Yale (9–1)	Yale (9–1)	24.
25.	Western Illinois	Weber State (1–0)	North Carolina A&T (2–0)	Holy Cross (2–1)	Samford (2–2)	UT Martin (3–2)	North Carolina Central (4–1)	North Carolina Central (5–1)	Southern Utah (5–2)	Kennesaw State (7–1)	Northern Iowa (5–4)	Nicholls State (8–2)	Northern Arizona (7–4)	Nicholls State (8–4)	25.
	Preseason Aug 7	Week 1 Sep 4	Week 2 Sep 11	Week 3 Sep 18	Week 4 Sep 25	Week 5 Oct 2	Week 6 Oct 9	Week 7 Oct 16	Week 8 Oct 23	Week 9 Oct 30	Week 10 Nov 6	Week 11 Nov 13	Week 12 Nov 19	Week 13 (Final) Jan 8	
		Dropped: 22. Fordham; 23. Cal Poly; 24. Albany	Dropped: 19. Lehigh; 25. Weber State	Dropped: 15. Chattanooga; 16. Charleston Southern; 21. Northern Iowa	Dropped: 17. North Dakota; 25. Holy Cross	Dropped: 22. Liberty; 24. Tennessee State	Dropped: 23. Stony Brook; 24. Albany; 25. UT Martin	Dropped: 23. The Citadel	Dropped: 23. Weber State; 25. North Carolina Central	Dropped: 19. Richmond; 21. Youngstown State; 23. Delaware; 24. Montana	Dropped: 20. Villanova	Dropped: 22. Western Carolina	Dropped: 25. Nicholls State	Dropped: 25. Northern Arizona	

== Coaches' Poll ==
	Preseason Aug 8	Week 1 Sep 4	Week 2 Sep 11	Week 3 Sep 18	Week 4 Sep 25	Week 5 Oct 2	Week 6 Oct 9	Week 7 Oct 16	Week 8 Oct 23	Week 9 Oct 30	Week 10 Nov 6	Week 11 Nov 13	Week 12 Nov 20	Week 13 (Final) Jan 9	
1.	James Madison 20	James Madison 25 (1–0)	James Madison 24 (2–0)	James Madison 25 (3–0)	James Madison 25 (4–0)	James Madison 25 (5–0)	James Madison 25 (5–0)	James Madison 26 (6–0)	James Madison 26 (7–0)	James Madison 26 (8–0)	James Madison 26 (9–0)	James Madison 26 (10–0)	James Madison 26 (11–0)	North Dakota State 24 (14–1)	1.
2.	North Dakota State 2	North Dakota State (1–0)	North Dakota State 2 (2–0)	North Dakota State 1 (2–0)	North Dakota State 1 (3–0)	North Dakota State 1 (4–0)	North Dakota State 1 (5–0)	North Dakota State (6–0)	North Dakota State (7–0)	North Dakota State (8–0)	Jacksonville State (8–1)	Jacksonville State (9–1)	Jacksonville State (10–1)	James Madison 1 (14–1)	2.
3.	Sam Houston State 3	Sam Houston State 1 (1–0)	Sam Houston State (2–0)	Sam Houston State (2–0)	Sam Houston State (3–0)	Youngstown State (3–1)	Jacksonville State (4–1)	Jacksonville State (5–1)	Jacksonville State (6–1)	Jacksonville State (7–1)	Central Arkansas (8–1)	Central Arkansas (9–1)	Central Arkansas (10–1)	Sam Houston State (12–2)	3.
4.	Eastern Washington	South Dakota State (1–0)	South Dakota State (2–0)	South Dakota State (3–0)	South Dakota State (3–0)	Jacksonville State (3–1)	South Dakota (5–0)	South Dakota (6–0)	Central Arkansas (6–1)	Central Arkansas (7–1)	Sam Houston State (8–1)	Sam Houston State (9–1)	North Dakota State (10–1)	South Dakota State (11–3)	4.
5.	Jacksonville State	Jacksonville State (1–0)	Youngstown State (1–1)	Youngstown State (2–1)	Youngstown State (2–1) т	Wofford (4–0)	Wofford (5–0)	Wofford (6–0)	Sam Houston State (6–1)	Sam Houston State (7–1)	South Dakota State (7–2)	South Dakota State (8–2)	Sam Houston State (10–1)	Weber State (11–3)	5.
6.	South Dakota State 1	Youngstown State (0–1) т	Richmond (1–1) т	Richmond (2–1)	Jacksonville State (2–1) т	South Dakota (4–0)	Central Arkansas (4–1)	Central Arkansas (5–1)	North Carolina A&T (8–0)	South Dakota (7–1)	North Dakota State (8–1)	North Dakota State (9–1)	South Dakota State (9–2)	North Carolina A&T 1 (12–0)	6.
7.	Richmond	Eastern Washington (0–1) т	Jacksonville State (1–1) т	Jacksonville State (1–1)	Wofford (3–0)	Illinois State (4–0)	South Dakota State (4–1)	Sam Houston State (5–1)	South Dakota (6–1)	North Carolina A&T (8–0)	North Carolina A&T (9–0)	North Carolina A&T (10–0) т	North Carolina A&T (11–0)	Wofford (10–3)	7.
8.	Youngstown State	Villanova (1–0)	Villanova (1–1)	Villanova (2–1)	Illinois State (3–0) т	Central Arkansas (3–1)	Youngstown State (3–2)	Eastern Washington (5–2)	Samford (5–2) т	South Dakota State (6–2)	Wofford (8–1)	Wofford (9–1) т	Weber State (9–2)	Central Arkansas (10–2)	8.
9.	Villanova	Richmond (0–1)	Wofford (2–0)	Wofford (2–0)	Eastern Washington (2–2) т	South Dakota State (3–1)	Sam Houston State (4–1) т	Youngstown State (3–3)	South Dakota State (5–2) т	Wofford (7–1)	Elon (8–1)	Weber State (8–2)	Wofford (9–2)	Kennesaw State (12–2)	9.
10.	North Dakota	Wofford (1–0)	North Dakota (1–1)	The Citadel (3–0)	South Dakota (3–0)	Eastern Washington (3–2)	Eastern Washington (4–2) т	Richmond (4–2)	Wofford (6–1)	Elon (7–1)	South Dakota (7–2)	Western Illinois (7–3)	Western Illinois (8–3)	Jacksonville State (10–3)	10.
11.	Wofford	North Dakota (0–1)	New Hampshire (2–0)	Eastern Washington (1–2)	The Citadel (3–0)	Sam Houston State (3–1)	North Carolina A&T (6–0)	North Carolina A&T (7–0)	Elon (6–1)	Eastern Washington (5–3)	Grambling State (8–1)	Grambling State (9–1)	Stony Brook (9–2)	Stony Brook (10–3)	11.
12.	The Citadel	New Hampshire (1–0)	Eastern Washington (0–2)	Illinois State (2–0)	Central Arkansas (2–1)	North Carolina A&T (5–0)	New Hampshire (4–1)	Western Illinois (5–1)	Eastern Washington (5–3)	Grambling State (7–1)	Weber State (7–2)	Stony Brook (8–2)	Grambling State (9–1)	Western Illinois (8–4)	12.
13.	Chattanooga	The Citadel (1–0)	The Citadel (2–0)	Central Arkansas (2–1)	North Carolina A&T (4–0)	New Hampshire (4–1)	Richmond (3–2)	South Dakota State (4–2)	Grambling State (6–1)	Illinois State (6–2)	Western Illinois (6–3)	Samford (7–3)	Southern Utah (9–2)	Southern Utah (9–3)	13.
14.	Charleston Southern	Chattanooga (0–1)	Illinois State (1–0)	South Dakota (3–0)	New Hampshire (3–1)	Richmond (2–2)	Villanova (4–2)	Samford (4–2)	Western Illinois (5–2)	Weber State (6–2)	Samford (6–3)	New Hampshire (7–3)	Samford (8–3)	Grambling State (11–2)	14.
15.	Central Arkansas	Illinois State (1–0)	Chattanooga (0–2)	North Carolina A&T (3–0)	Richmond (2–2)	Villanova (3–2)	Illinois State (4–1)	Elon (5–1)	Villanova (4–3)	Samford (5–3)	Stony Brook (7–2)	Elon (8–2)	McNeese State (9–2)	New Hampshire (9–5)	15.
16.	New Hampshire	Central Arkansas (0–1)	Central Arkansas (1–1)	New Hampshire (2–1)	Western Illinois (3–0)	Weber State (4–1)	Weber State (4–1)	Villanova (4–3)	New Hampshire (5–2)	Northern Arizona (6–2)	New Hampshire (6–3)	South Dakota (7–3)	Kennesaw State (10–1)	South Dakota (8–5)	16.
17.	Lehigh	Samford (1–0)	Samford (2–0)	Samford (2–1)	Villanova (2–2)	The Citadel (3–1)	Western Illinois (4–1)	Grambling State (5–1)	Richmond (4–3)	Nicholls State (6–2)	Nicholls State (7–2)	Nicholls State (8–2)	Elon (8–3)	Samford (8–4)	17.
18.	Illinois State	Charleston Southern (0–1)	Northern Iowa (1–1)	Weber State (2–1)	Weber State (3–1)	Western Illinois (3–1)	Samford (4–2)	New Hampshire (4–2)	McNeese State (6–1)	Western Illinois (5–3)	McNeese State (7–2)	Southern Utah (8–2)	South Dakota (7–4)	McNeese State (9–2)	18.
19.	Samford	Lehigh (0–1)	Charleston Southern (0–1)	North Dakota (1–2)	Grambling State (3–1)	Grambling State (4–1)	Grambling State (5–1)	McNeese State (5–1)	Youngstown State (3–4)	New Hampshire (5–3)	Southern Utah (7–2)	McNeese State (8–2)	Eastern Washington (7–4)	Northern Iowa (8–5)	19.
20.	Northern Iowa	Weber State (1–0)	North Carolina A&T (2–0)	Tennessee State (3–0)	Northern Iowa (1–2)	Samford (3–2)	Elon (5–1)	Nicholls State (5–2)	Western Carolina (6–2)	Villanova (4–4)	Illinois State (6–3)	Eastern Washington (6–4)	New Hampshire (7–4)	Furman (8–5)	20.
21.	Grambling State	Northern Iowa (0–1) т	Weber State (1–1)	Western Illinois (2–0)	UT Martin (3–1)	Northern Iowa (2–2)	McNeese State (5–1)	Western Carolina (5–2)	Illinois State (5–2)	Stony Brook (6–2)	Eastern Washington (5–4)	Kennesaw State (9–1)	Northern Iowa (7–4)	Elon (8–4)	21.
22.	Weber State	North Carolina A&T (1–0) т	Western Illinois (2–0)	Grambling State (2–1)	Albany (3–1)	McNeese State (3–1)	The Citadel (3–2)	Northern Arizona (4–2)	Weber State (5–2)	McNeese State (6–2)	Monmouth (8–1)	Monmouth (9–1)	Nicholls State (8–3)	Eastern Washington (7–4)	22.
23.	Cal Poly	Grambling State (0–1)	South Dakota (2–0)	Nicholls State (2–1)	Samford (2–2)	Elon (4–1)	Nicholls State (4–2)	Weber State (4–2)	Nicholls State (5–2)	Southern Utah (6–2)	Kennesaw State (8–1)	Northern Arizona (7–3)	Monmouth (9–2)	Nicholls State (8–4)	23.
24.	North Carolina Central	Tennessee State (1–0)	Tennessee State (2–0)	Northern Iowa (1–2)	Tennessee State (3–1)	Stony Brook (4–1)	Northern Arizona (3–2)	Illinois State (4–2)	Northern Arizona (5–2)	Monmouth (7–1)	Northern Arizona (6–3)	Furman (7–3)	Yale (9–1)	Yale (9–1)	24.
25.	North Carolina A&T	Colgate (1–0)	Grambling State (1–1)	Holy Cross (2–1)	McNeese State (3–1)	Nicholls State (3–3)	Western Carolina (4–2)	Montana (5–2)	Northern Iowa (4–3)	Kennesaw State (7–1)	Western Carolina (7–3)	Illinois State (6–4)	Furman (7–4)	San Diego (10–3)	25.
	Preseason Aug 8	Week 1 Sep 4	Week 2 Sep 11	Week 3 Sep 18	Week 4 Sep 25	Week 5 Oct 2	Week 6 Oct 9	Week 7 Oct 16	Week 8 Oct 23	Week 9 Oct 30	Week 10 Nov 6	Week 11 Nov 13	Week 12 Nov 20	Week 13 (Final) Jan 9	
		Dropped: 23. Cal Poly; 24. North Carolina Central	Dropped: 19. Lehigh; 25. Colgate	Dropped: 15. Chattanooga; 19. Charleston Southern	Dropped: 19. North Dakota; 23. Nicholls State; 25. Holy Cross	Dropped: 21. UT Martin; 22. Albany; 24. Tennessee State	Dropped: 21. Northern Iowa; 24. Stony Brook	Dropped: 22. The Citadel	Dropped: 25. Montana	Dropped: 17. Richmond; 19. Youngstown State; 20. Western Carolina; 25. Northern Iowa	Dropped: 20. Villanova	Dropped: 25. Western Carolina	Dropped: 23. Northern Arizona; 25. Illinois State	Dropped: 23. Monmouth	
