= Next Level Sports =

American sports television channel

- Country: United States
- Broadcast area: Nationwide

Programming
- Language: English

Ownership
- Owner: Lax United Marketing, LLC

History
- Launched: March 16, 2017
- Replaced: One World Sports
- Former names: Eleven Sports Network (2017–2021)

Links
- Website: nlse.com

Availability

Streaming media
- FuboTV: paid subscription service
- Samsung TV Plus: 1167 (FTF)
- Twitch: twitch.tv/FTFNext
- The Roku Channel: 228 (FTF)

Next Level Sports is an American sports-oriented cable and satellite television channel. The network also operates an online presence under the alternate brand For the Fans (FTF).

== History ==
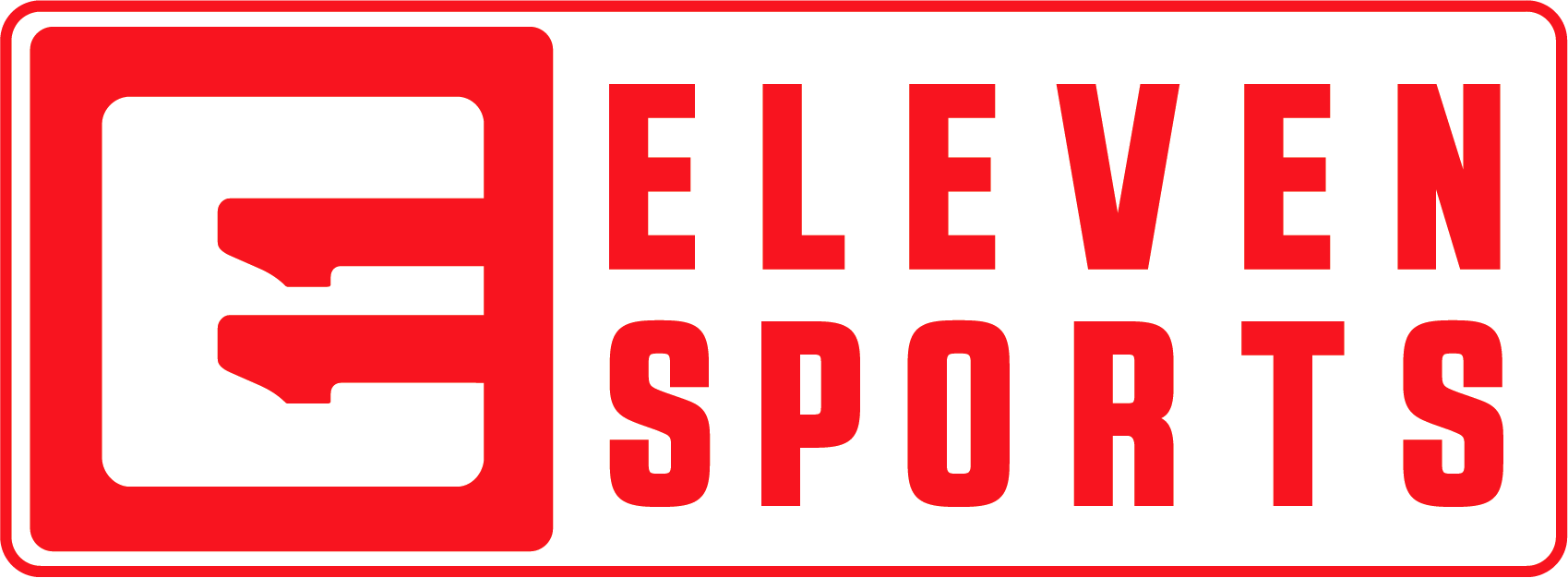
Logo 2017-2020

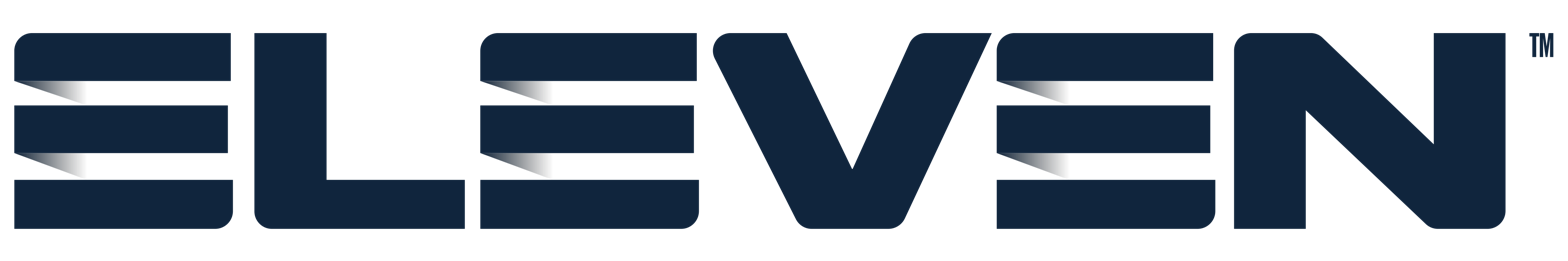
Logo 2020-2021

In March 2017, the U.S. international sports channel One World Sports was replaced by Eleven Sports Network with no advance announcement. One World Sports' staff had been furloughed as a cost-cutting measure in November 2016, and it was reported that the network was exploring a sale.

On March 16, 2017, Eleven Sports officially announced that it had acquired "certain distribution assets" of One World Sports. Financial details of the sale were not disclosed. Group Marketing Director Danny Menken explained that Eleven planned to target rights to niche international sports that have fanbases in the United States (as opposed to its business model in other territories, where Eleven targets the top international sports rights in smaller markets).

In response to questions surrounding employees and freelancers of One World Sports that had not yet been paid for their work, he emphasized that they had only acquired "certain distribution assets", and that "people that have issues with [OWS] have to contact management, but we have no shares or relationship beyond the acquisition of distribution assets."

In March 2018, Eleven started to live stream on Twitch with select programing called Eleven Sports Prime. It would rebrand to Eleven Sports Next by the end of the year. On March 21, 2019, it was announced Eleven Sports was added on free OTT service Xumo. Pluto TV added Eleven Sports on July 23, 2019. The online feeds do not carry the full Eleven Sports schedule, as several sporting events are blacked out and not allowed to be distributed online; filler programs are substituted during such programs.

=== Programming ===
Prior to the 2017 season, Eleven reached deals to broadcast Big Sky Conference, Ivy League, Southland Conference, and UMass Minutemen college football games. The UMass games are simulcast on NESN and online. Eleven also reached deals to televise 14 UMass men's basketball and hockey games, with the majority airing on either NESN or NESN Plus, and one on NBC Sports Boston. Eleven Sports lost the rights to UMass sports to FloSports in August 2019.

Eleven's Big Sky contract includes weekly games in football and men's basketball, as well as some conference tournament games for men's and women's basketball, and women's soccer, volleyball, and softball. Eleven Sports also announced a partnership with Twitter to stream 7 of its Ivy League football games during the 2017 season.

The network acquired U.S. rights to Belgian First Division A soccer, and Spain's Liga ACB basketball. On January 9, 2018, Eleven announced a partnership to televise 120 NBA G League games in the 2017–18 season.

In March 2021, the cable and satellite channel was rebranded as Next Level Sports; its online presence, which has been branded as For the Fans since 2019, retained that brand.

== Broadcasting rights ==
=== Basketball ===
==== Professional ====
- Chinese Basketball Association
- Liga ACB
- Copa del Rey de Baloncesto
- Canadian Elite Basketball League

==== College ====
- Big Sky Conference
- Ivy League
- Southland Conference

=== Football ===
==== Men ====
- A7FL
- Big Sky Conference
- Frontier Conference
- Ivy League
- Southland Conference
- National Arena League
- The Spring League
- European League of Football

==== Women ====
- Women's Football Alliance

=== Soccer ===
- K League 1
- Ekstraklasa

=== Baseball ===
- Canadian American Association of Professional Baseball
- Australian Baseball League
- Pacific League (NPB)

=== Ice hockey ===
- Swedish Hockey League

=== Rugby ===
- Collegiate Rugby Association of America
- Division 1-A Rugby
- Freetail 7's

=== Combat sports ===
- Kings Promotions
- Karate Combat
- Fite TV
- United Fight Alliance
- OVW Wrestling

=== Motorsport ===
- International GT Open
- Formula America
- Race Max (30 minute highlights)

=== Esports ===
- BLAST Pro Series
- Simulation Football League
- Major League Rugby Virtual

=== Others ===
- Archery
- Billiards
- Cornhole
- Drones DCL
- Sports Unlimited
- Hempel Sailing World Cup
- Mania
- Water Polo
- Squash
- Planet X

== On-air staff ==
=== Current on-air staff ===
- Andrew Gilford
