= Georgia State Panthers football statistical leaders =

The Georgia State Panthers football statistical leaders are individual statistical leaders of the Georgia State Panthers football program in various categories, including passing, rushing, receiving, total offense, defensive stats, and kicking. Within those areas, the lists identify single-game, single-season, and career leaders. The Panthers represent Georgia State University in the NCAA's Sun Belt Conference.

Georgia State began competing in intercollegiate football in 2010. Therefore, complete box scores for all games are readily available and the Panthers don't have an era of incomplete statistics. These lists are updated through the end of the 2025 season.

== Passing ==
=== Passing yards ===
Career
| Rank | Player | Yards | Years |
|---|---|---|---|
| 1 | Nick Arbuckle | 7,651 | 2014 2015 |
| 2 | Darren Grainger | 6,779 | 2021 2022 2023 |
| 3 | Conner Manning | 5,554 | 2016 2017 |
| 4 | Dan Ellington | 4,566 | 2018 2019 |
| 5 | Ronnie Bell | 3,124 | 2012 2013 2014 |
| 6 | Cornelious Brown IV | 2,792 | 2019 2020 2021 |
| 7 | Cameran Brown | 2,652 | 2025 2026 |
| 8 | Drew Little | 2,570 | 2010 2011 |
| 9 | Christian Veilleux | 2,556 | 2024 2025 |
| 10 | Ben McLane | 1,982 | 2012 2013 2014 |

Single season
| Rank | Player | Yards | Year |
|---|---|---|---|
| 1 | Nick Arbuckle | 4,368 | 2015 |
| 2 | Nick Arbuckle | 3,283 | 2014 |
| 3 | Conner Manning | 2,870 | 2017 |
| 4 | Conner Manning | 2,684 | 2016 |
| 5 | Darren Grainger | 2,621 | 2023 |
| 6 | Ronnie Bell | 2,573 | 2013 |
| 7 | Dan Ellington | 2,447 | 2019 |
| 8 | Darren Grainger | 2,443 | 2022 |
| 9 | Cornelious Brown IV | 2,278 | 2020 |
| 10 | Dan Ellington | 2,119 | 2018 |

Single game
| Rank | Player | Yards | Year | Opponent |
|---|---|---|---|---|
| 1 | Nick Arbuckle | 471 | 2015 | Texas State |
| 2 | Darren Grainger | 466 | 2023 | Charlotte |
| 3 | Conner Manning | 446 | 2017 | Louisiana Monroe |
| 4 | Conner Manning | 422 | 2016 | Louisiana Monroe |
| 5 | Drew Little | 414 | 2010 | Old Dominion |
| | Nick Arbuckle | 414 | 2014 | Air Force |
| 7 | Nick Arbuckle | 413 | 2014 | Abilene Christian |
| 8 | Nick Arbuckle | 412 | 2015 | Ball State |
| 9 | Nick Arbuckle | 408 | 2014 | Georgia Southern |
| 10 | Ronnie Bell | 391 | 2013 | Samford |

=== Passing touchdowns ===
Career
| Rank | Player | TDs | Years |
|---|---|---|---|
| 1 | Darren Grainger | 57 | 2021 2022 2023 |
| 2 | Nick Arbuckle | 51 | 2014 2015 |
| 3 | Dan Ellington | 34 | 2018 2019 |
| 4 | Conner Manning | 29 | 2016 2017 |
| 5 | Cameran Brown | 27 | 2025 2026 |
| 6 | Drew Little | 18 | 2010 2011 |
| | Ronnie Bell | 18 | 2012 2013 2014 |
| 8 | Cornelious Brown IV | 17 | 2019 2020 2021 |
| 9 | Christian Veilleux | 16 | 2024 2025 |
| 10 | Kelton Hill | 12 | 2010 2011 2012 2013 |
| | Ben McLane | 12 | 2012 2013 2014 |

Single season
| Rank | Player | TDs | Year |
|---|---|---|---|
| 1 | Nick Arbuckle | 28 | 2015 |
| 2 | Nick Arbuckle | 23 | 2014 |
| 3 | Dan Ellington | 22 | 2019 |
| 4 | Darren Grainger | 20 | 2023 |
| 5 | Darren Grainger | 19 | 2021 |
| 6 | Drew Little | 18 | 2010 |
| | Darren Grainger | 18 | 2022 |
| 8 | Cornelious Brown IV | 17 | 2020 |
| 9 | Conner Manning | 16 | 2016 |
| 10 | Ronnie Bell | 15 | 2013 |

Single game
| Rank | Player | TDs | Year | Opponent |
|---|---|---|---|---|
| 1 | Cameran Brown | 6 | 2026 | Old Dominion |
| 2 | Dan Ellington | 5 | 2019 | Furman |
| 3 | Drew Little | 4 | 2010 | Savannah State |
| | Drew Little | 4 | 2010 | Morehead State |
| | Kelton Hill | 4 | 2011 | Campbell |
| | Ronnie Bell | 4 | 2013 | Troy |
| | Nick Arbuckle | 4 | 2014 | Abilene Christian |
| | Nick Arbuckle | 4 | 2014 | Georgia Southern |
| | Nick Arbuckle | 4 | 2014 | Texas State |
| | Nick Arbuckle | 4 | 2015 | Texas State |
| | Conner Manning | 4 | 2017 | Louisiana Monroe |
| | Darren Grainger | 4 | 2021 | Louisiana Monroe |
| | Darren Grainger | 4 | 2022 | Charlotte |
| | Cameran Brown | 4 | 2025 | South Alabama |

== Rushing ==
=== Rushing yards ===
Career
| Rank | Player | Yards | Years |
|---|---|---|---|
| 1 | Tucker Gregg | 2,265 | 2018 2019 2020 2021 2022 |
| 2 | Tra Barnett | 2,156 | 2016 2017 2018 2019 |
| 3 | Marcus Carroll | 2,136 | 2020 2021 2022 2023 |
| 4 | Darren Grainger | 2,116 | 2021 2022 2023 |
| 5 | Destin Coates | 1,638 | 2018 2019 2020 2021 |
| 6 | Jamyest Williams | 1,559 | 2020 2021 2022 |
| 7 | Travis Evans | 1,500 | 2010 2011 2012 2013 |
| 8 | Donald Russell | 1,412 | 2011 2012 |
| 9 | Dan Ellington | 1,293 | 2018 2019 |
| 10 | Kyler Neal | 1,132 | 2013 2014 2015 2016 2017 |

Single season
| Rank | Player | Yards | Year |
|---|---|---|---|
| 1 | Tra Barnett | 1,453 | 2019 |
| 2 | Marcus Carroll | 1,350 | 2023 |
| 3 | Tucker Gregg | 953 | 2021 |
| 4 | Jamyest Williams | 859 | 2021 |
| 5 | Freddie Brock | 819 | 2024 |
| 6 | Destin Coates | 769 | 2020 |
| 7 | Donald Russell | 747 | 2012 |
| 8 | Darren Grainger | 736 | 2023 |
| 9 | Darren Grainger | 734 | 2022 |
| 10 | Tucker Gregg | 705 | 2022 |

Single game
| Rank | Player | Yards | Year | Opponent |
|---|---|---|---|---|
| 1 | Freddie Brock | 276 | 2023 | Utah State |
| 2 | Tra Barnett | 242 | 2019 | Troy |
| 3 | Marcus Carroll | 208 | 2023 | Georgia Southern |
| 4 | Donald Russell | 201 | 2012 | Rhode Island |
| 5 | Tra Barnett | 190 | 2019 | UL Monroe |
| 6 | Marcus Carroll | 184 | 2023 | Rhode Island |
| 7 | Jordon Simmons | 164 | 2025 | Marshall |
| 8 | Marcus Carroll | 163 | 2022 | Southern Miss |
| 9 | Tra Barnett | 161 | 2018 | Coastal Carolina |
| 10 | Marcus Carroll | 159 | 2023 | Marshall |

=== Rushing touchdowns ===
Career
| Rank | Player | TDs | Years |
|---|---|---|---|
| 1 | Tucker Gregg | 28 | 2018 2019 2020 2021 2022 |
| 2 | Marcus Carroll | 22 | 2020 2021 2022 2023 |
| 3 | Tra Barnett | 19 | 2016 2017 2018 2019 |
| | Darren Grainger | 19 | 2021 2022 2023 |
| 5 | Destin Coates | 16 | 2018 2019 2020 2021 |
| 6 | Kyler Neal | 13 | 2013 2014 2015 2016 2017 |
| 7 | Donald Russell | 12 | 2011 2012 |
| 8 | Dan Ellington | 11 | 2018 2019 |
| | Jamyest Williams | 11 | 2020 2021 2022 |
| 10 | Travis Evans | 10 | 2010 2011 2012 2013 |

Single season
| Rank | Player | TDs | Year |
|---|---|---|---|
| 1 | Marcus Carroll | 13 | 2023 |
| 2 | Tra Barnett | 12 | 2019 |
| | Tucker Gregg | 12 | 2022 |
| 4 | Darren Grainger | 10 | 2023 |
| 5 | Donald Russell | 9 | 2011 |
| | Tucker Gregg | 9 | 2021 |
| | Jamyest Williams | 9 | 2021 |
| 8 | Freddie Brock | 8 | 2024 |
| 9 | Tra Barnett | 7 | 2018 |
| | Destin Coates | 7 | 2019 |
| | Destin Coates | 7 | 2020 |
| | Cornelious Brown IV | 7 | 2020 |

Single game
| Rank | Player | TDs | Year | Opponent |
|---|---|---|---|---|
| 1 | Marcus Caffey | 3 | 2014 | Louisiana-Lafayette |
| | Destin Coates | 3 | 2019 | Arkansas State |
| | Tucker Gregg | 3 | 2020 | South Alabama |
| | Tucker Gregg | 3 | 2021 | Coastal Carolina |
| | Marcus Carroll | 3 | 2022 | Southern Miss |
| | Marcus Carroll | 3 | 2023 | Rhode Island |
| | Marcus Carroll | 3 | 2023 | UConn |
| | Freddie Brock | 3 | 2024 | Texas State |
| 9 | Parris Lee | 2 | 2010 | Shorter |
| | Kelton Hill | 2 | 2011 | West Alabama |
| | Donald Russell | 2 | 2011 | Murray State |
| | Donald Russell | 2 | 2011 | Clark Atlanta |
| | Donald Russell | 2 | 2012 | Rhode Island |
| | Krysten Hammon | 2 | 2014 | New Mexico State |
| | Kyler Neal | 2 | 2015 | Georgia Southern |
| | Destin Coates | 2 | 2020 | East Carolina |
| | Cornelious Brown IV | 2 | 2020 | Arkansas State |
| | Destin Coates | 2 | 2020 | UL Monroe |
| | Jamyest Williams | 2 | 2021 | Texas State |
| | Tucker Gregg | 2 | 2021 | Georgia Southern |
| | Jamyest Williams | 2 | 2021 | Arkansas State |
| | Tucker Gregg | 2 | 2022 | Charlotte |
| | Tucker Gregg | 2 | 2022 | Georgia Southern |
| | Tucker Gregg | 2 | 2022 | UL Monroe |
| | Darren Grainger | 2 | 2023 | Marshall |
| | Marcus Carroll | 2 | 2023 | Georgia Southern |
| | Darren Grainger | 2 | 2023 | James Madison |
| | Darren Grainger | 2 | 2023 | Utah State |
| | Freddie Brock | 2 | 2024 | Coastal Carolina |

== Receiving ==
=== Receptions ===
Career
| Rank | Player | Rec | Years |
|---|---|---|---|
| 1 | Robert Davis | 222 | 2013 2014 2015 2016 |
| 2 | Penny Hart | 202 | 2015 2016 2017 2018 |
| 3 | Albert Wilson | 175 | 2010 2011 2012 2013 |
| 4 | Cornelius McCoy | 148 | 2018 2019 2020 2021 |
| 5 | Ted Hurst | 127 | 2024 2025 |
| 6 | Danny Williams | 121 | 2010 2011 2012 2013 |
| 7 | Sam Pinckney | 113 | 2018 2019 2020 2021 |
| 8 | Glenn Smith | 111 | 2014 2015 2016 2017 |
| 9 | Jamari Thrash | 104 | 2019 2020 2021 2022 |
| 10 | Robert Lewis | 102 | 2021 2022 2023 |

Single season
| Rank | Player | Rec | Year |
|---|---|---|---|
| 1 | Penny Hart | 74 | 2017 |
| 2 | Penny Hart | 71 | 2015 |
| | Albert Wilson | 71 | 2013 |
| | Ted Hurst | 71 | 2025 |
| 5 | Cornelius McCoy | 70 | 2019 |
| | Robert Lewis | 70 | 2023 |
| 7 | Robert Davis | 67 | 2016 |
| 8 | Robert Davis | 61 | 2015 |
| | Jamari Thrash | 61 | 2022 |
| 10 | Donovan Harden | 60 | 2014 |

Single game
| Rank | Player | Rec | Year | Opponent |
|---|---|---|---|---|
| 1 | Robert Lewis | 12 | 2023 | Georgia Southern |
| 2 | Danny Williams | 11 | 2010 | Old Dominion |
| | Donovan Harden | 11 | 2014 | Georgia Southern |
| | Penny Hart | 11 | 2015 | New Mexico State |
| 5 | Donovan Harden | 10 | 2014 | South Alabama |
| | Keith Rucker | 10 | 2015 | Troy |
| | Sam Pinckney | 10 | 2020 | Georgia Southern |
| | Jamari Thrash | 10 | 2022 | Charlotte |
| | Jamari Thrash | 10 | 2022 | Marshall |
| | Ted Hurst | 10 | 2025 | Murray State |
| | Ted Hurst | 10 | 2025 | Coastal Carolina |

=== Receiving yards ===
Career
| Rank | Player | Yards | Years |
|---|---|---|---|
| 1 | Robert Davis | 3,391 | 2013 2014 2015 2016 |
| 2 | Albert Wilson | 3,190 | 2010 2011 2012 2013 |
| 3 | Penny Hart | 2,950 | 2015 2016 2017 2018 |
| 4 | Ted Hurst | 1,965 | 2024 2025 |
| 5 | Cornelius McCoy | 1,809 | 2018 2019 2020 2021 |
| 6 | Jamari Thrash | 1,752 | 2019 2020 2021 2022 |
| 7 | Sam Pinckney | 1,668 | 2018 2019 2020 2021 |
| 8 | Danny Williams | 1,605 | 2010 2011 2012 2013 |
| 9 | Donovan Harden | 1,600 | 2014 2015 |
| 10 | Robert Lewis | 1,323 | 2021 2022 2023 |

Single season
| Rank | Player | Yards | Year |
|---|---|---|---|
| 1 | Albert Wilson | 1,177 | 2013 |
| 2 | Jamari Thrash | 1,122 | 2022 |
| 3 | Penny Hart | 1,121 | 2017 |
| 4 | Penny Hart | 1,099 | 2015 |
| 5 | Ted Hurst | 1,004 | 2025 |
| 6 | Robert Davis | 980 | 2015 |
| 7 | Robert Davis | 968 | 2016 |
| 8 | Ted Hurst | 961 | 2024 |
| 9 | Albert Wilson | 947 | 2012 |
| 10 | Donovan Harden | 885 | 2014 |

Single game
| Rank | Player | Yards | Year | Opponent |
|---|---|---|---|---|
| 1 | Robert Lewis | 220 | 2023 | Charlotte |
| 2 | Jamari Thrash | 213 | 2022 | Charlotte |
| 3 | Donovan Harden | 186 | 2014 | Georgia Southern |
| 4 | Donovan Harden | 179 | 2015 | Liberty |
| 5 | Robert Davis | 177 | 2015 | Texas State |
| 6 | Sam Pinckney | 176 | 2020 | South Alabama |
| 7 | Albert Wilson | 175 | 2011 | South Alabama |
| 8 | Ted Hurst | 173 | 2024 | Arkansas State |
| 9 | Ted Hurst | 172 | 2025 | Murray State |
| 10 | Albert Wilson | 167 | 2013 | Samford |
| | Jamari Thrash | 167 | 2022 | Marshall |

=== Receiving touchdowns ===
Career
| Rank | Player | TDs | Years |
|---|---|---|---|
| 1 | Albert Wilson | 23 | 2010 2011 2012 2013 |
| 2 | Penny Hart | 19 | 2015 2016 2017 2018 |
| 3 | Robert Davis | 17 | 2013 2014 2015 2016 |
| 4 | Ted Hurst | 15 | 2024 2025 |
| 5 | Robert Lewis | 14 | 2021 2022 2023 |
| 6 | Sam Pinckney | 13 | 2018 2019 2020 2021 |
| | Aubry Payne | 13 | 2019 2020 2021 2022 |
| 8 | Donovan Harden | 12 | 2014 2015 |
| | Roger Carter | 12 | 2017 2018 2019 2020 2021 |
| | Jamari Thrash | 12 | 2019 2020 2021 2022 |

Single season
| Rank | Player | TDs | Year |
|---|---|---|---|
| 1 | Ted Hurst | 9 | 2024 |
| 2 | Albert Wilson | 8 | 2013 |
| | Penny Hart | 8 | 2015 |
| | Penny Hart | 8 | 2017 |
| 5 | Albert Wilson | 7 | 2012 |
| | Donovan Harden | 7 | 2014 |
| | Sam Pinckney | 7 | 2020 |
| | Aubry Payne | 7 | 2021 |
| | Jamari Thrash | 7 | 2022 |
| | Robert Lewis | 7 | 2023 |

Single game
| Rank | Player | TDs | Year | Opponent |
|---|---|---|---|---|
| 1 | Donovan Harden | 4 | 2014 | Georgia Southern |

== Total offense ==
Total offense is the sum of passing and rushing statistics. It does not include receiving or returns.

=== Total offense yards ===
Career
| Rank | Player | Yards | Years |
|---|---|---|---|
| 1 | Darren Grainger | 8,895 | 2021 2022 2023 |
| 2 | Nick Arbuckle | 7,566 | 2014 2015 |
| 3 | Ronnie Bell | 3,298 | 2012 2013 2014 |
| 4 | Cornelious Brown IV | 3,157 | 2019 2020 2021 |
| 5 | Cameran Brown | 3,110 | 2025 2026 |
| 6 | Christian Veilleux | 2,683 | 2024 2025 |
| 7 | Conner Manning | 2,681 | 2016 |
| 8 | Drew Little | 2,531 | 2010 2011 |
| 9 | Kelton Hill | 2,346 | 2010 2011 2012 2013 |
| 10 | Tucker Gregg | 2,265 | 2018 2019 2020 2021 2022 |

Single season
| Rank | Player | Yards | Year |
|---|---|---|---|
| 1 | Nick Arbuckle | 4,273 | 2015 |
| 2 | Darren Grainger | 3,357 | 2023 |
| 3 | Nick Arbuckle | 3,293 | 2014 |
| 4 | Darren Grainger | 3,177 | 2022 |
| 5 | Ronnie Bell | 2,686 | 2013 |
| 6 | Conner Manning | 2,681 | 2016 |
| 7 | Cornelious Brown IV | 2,579 | 2020 |
| 8 | Darren Grainger | 2,361 | 2021 |
| 9 | Christian Veilleux | 2,121 | 2024 |
| 10 | Drew Little | 2,078 | 2010 |

Single game
| Rank | Player | Yards | Year | Opponent |
|---|---|---|---|---|
| 1 | Nick Arbuckle | 496 | 2015 | Texas State |
| 2 | Darren Grainger | 489 | 2023 | Charlotte |
| 3 | Conner Manning | 465 | 2017 | Louisiana Monroe |
| 4 | Nick Arbuckle | 438 | 2014 | Abilene Christian |
| 5 | Conner Manning | 420 | 2016 | Louisiana Monroe |
| 6 | Nick Arbuckle | 419 | 2014 | Air Force |
| 7 | Drew Little | 417 | 2010 | Old Dominion |
| 8 | Nick Arbuckle | 412 | 2014 | Georgia Southern |
| 9 | Cameran Brown | 400 | 2025 | Georgia Southern |
| 10 | Darren Grainger | 399 | 2022 | UL Monroe |

=== Total touchdowns ===
Career
| Rank | Player | TDs | Years |
|---|---|---|---|
| 1 | Darren Grainger | 76 | 2021 2022 2023 |
| 2 | Nick Arbuckle | 59 | 2014 2015 |
| 3 | Cameran Brown | 32 | 2025 2026 |
| 4 | Tucker Gregg | 28 | 2018 2019 2020 2021 2022 |
| 5 | Cornelious Brown IV | 26 | 2019 2020 2021 |
| 6 | Drew Little | 22 | 2010 2011 |
| | Marcus Carroll | 22 | 2020 2021 2022 2023 |
| 8 | Ronnie Bell | 21 | 2012 2013 2014 |
| 9 | Kelton Hill | 19 | 2010 2011 2012 2013 |
| 10 | Conner Manning | 18 | 2016 |

Single season
| Rank | Player | TDs | Year |
|---|---|---|---|
| 1 | Nick Arbuckle | 34 | 2015 |
| 2 | Darren Grainger | 76 | 2023 |
| 3 | Nick Arbuckle | 25 | 2014 |
| 4 | Cornelious Brown IV | 24 | 2020 |
| | Darren Grainger | 24 | 2022 |
| 6 | Drew Little | 22 | 2010 |
| | Darren Grainger | 22 | 2021 |
| 8 | Ronnie Bell | 18 | 2013 |
| | Conner Manning | 18 | 2016 |
| 10 | Cameran Brown | 17 | 2025 |

Single game
| Rank | Player | TDs | Year | Opponent |
|---|---|---|---|---|
| 1 | Cameran Brown | 6 | 2026 | Old Dominion |
| 2 | Kelton Hill | 5 | 2011 | Campbell |
| | Darren Grainger | 5 | 2021 | Louisiana Monroe |
| | Darren Grainger | 5 | 2023 | Utah State |
| 5 | Drew Little | 4 | 2010 | Savannah State |
| | Drew Little | 4 | 2010 | Morehead State |
| | Drew Little | 4 | 2010 | South Alabama |
| | Ronnie Bell | 4 | 2013 | Troy |
| | Nick Arbuckle | 4 | 2014 | Abilene Christian |
| | Nick Arbuckle | 4 | 2014 | Georgia Southern |
| | Nick Arbuckle | 4 | 2014 | Texas State |
| | Nick Arbuckle | 4 | 2015 | Oregon |
| | Nick Arbuckle | 4 | 2015 | Liberty |
| | Nick Arbuckle | 4 | 2015 | Texas State |
| | Darren Grainger | 4 | 2021 | Ball State |
| | Darren Grainger | 4 | 2022 | Charlotte |
| | Darren Grainger | 4 | 2023 | Charlotte |
| | Christian Veilleux | 4 | 2024 | Vanderbilt |
| | Cameran Brown | 4 | 2025 | South Alabama |

== Defense ==
=== Interceptions ===
Career
| Rank | Player | Ints | Years |
|---|---|---|---|
| 1 | Quavin White | 11 | 2018 2019 2020 2021 2022 |
| | Antavious Lane | 11 | 2019 2020 2021 2022 |
| 3 | Chandon Sullivan | 6 | 2014 2015 2016 |
| 4 | Brent McClendon | 5 | 2010 2011 2012 2013 |
| | Tarris Batiste | 5 | 2013 2014 2015 |
| | Bryquice Brown | 5 | 2020 2021 2022 2023 |
| | Gavin Pringle | 5 | 2023 2024 |
| 8 | Demazio Skelton | 4 | 2011 2012 |
| | D'Mario Gunn | 4 | 2011 2012 |
| | Jerome Smith | 4 | 2014 2015 2016 |

Single season
| Rank | Player | Ints | Year |
|---|---|---|---|
| 1 | Antavious Lane | 5 | 2021 |
| 2 | Tarris Batiste | 4 | 2015 |
| | Antavious Lane | 4 | 2020 |
| | Quavin White | 4 | 2022 |
| | Gavin Pringle | 4 | 2023 |
| 6 | Demazio Skelton | 3 | 2012 |
| | Bobby Baker | 3 | 2015 |
| | B. J. Clay | 3 | 2016 |
| | Jerome Smith | 3 | 2016 |
| | Chandon Sullivan | 3 | 2016 |
| | Quavin White | 3 | 2020 |
| | Kenyatta Watson II | 3 | 2024 |

Single game
| Rank | Player | Ints | Year | Opponent |
|---|---|---|---|---|
| 1 | D'Mario Gunn | 2 | 2011 | Murray State |
| | Demazio Skelton | 2 | 2012 | Old Dominion |
| | Tarris Batiste | 2 | 2015 | Georgia Southern |
| | Jerome Smith | 2 | 2016 | Ball State |
| | B. J. Clay | 2 | 2016 | Tennessee-Martin |
| | Quavian White | 2 | 2022 | South Carolina |
| | Coby Owens | 2 | 2026 | App State |

=== Tackles ===
Career
| Rank | Player | Tackles | Years |
|---|---|---|---|
| 1 | Joseph Peterson | 381 | 2012 2013 2014 2015 |
| 2 | Jordan Veneziale | 281 | 2019 2020 2021 2022 2023 |
| 3 | Tarris Batiste | 263 | 2013 2014 2015 |
| 4 | Trajan Stephens-McQueen | 258 | 2017 2018 2019 2020 |
| 5 | Jontrey Hunter | 232 | 2018 2019 2020 2021 2022 2023 |
| 6 | Antavious Lane | 225 | 2019 2020 2021 2022 |
| 7 | Quavin White | 200 | 2018 2019 2020 2021 2022 |
| | Blake Carroll | 200 | 2018 2019 2020 2021 2022 |
| 9 | Robert Ferguson | 199 | 2010 2011 2012 2013 |
| | Josiah Robinson | 199 | 2023 2024 2025 |

Single season
| Rank | Player | Tackles | Year |
|---|---|---|---|
| 1 | Joseph Peterson | 116 | 2015 |
| 2 | Trajan Stephens-McQueen | 107 | 2019 |
| 3 | Joseph Peterson | 103 | 2013 |
| 4 | Tarris Batiste | 100 | 2015 |
| 5 | Jordan Veneziale | 98 | 2022 |
| 6 | Joseph Peterson | 97 | 2014 |
| | Alonzo McGee | 97 | 2016 |
| 8 | Jordan Veneziale | 96 | 2021 |
| | Josiah Robinson | 96 | 2025 |
| 10 | Jontrey Hunter | 95 | 2023 |

Single game
| Rank | Player | Tackles | Year | Opponent |
|---|---|---|---|---|
| 1 | Fred Barnes | 16 | 2010 | Shorter |
| | Joseph Peterson | 16 | 2013 | Troy |
| 3 | Joseph Peterson | 15 | 2014 | New Mexico State |
| | Chase Middleton | 15 | 2016 | Air Force |
| | Antavious Lane | 15 | 2022 | Georgia Southern |
| 6 | Mark Hogan | 14 | 2010 | Old Dominion |
| | Joseph Peterson | 14 | 2014 | Washington |
| | Nate Simon | 14 | 2014 | Georgia State |
| | Joseph Peterson | 14 | 2015 | Appalachian State |
| | Joseph Peterson | 14 | 2015 | Ball State |
| | Joseph Peterson | 14 | 2015 | Arkansas State |
| | Blake Carroll | 14 | 2020 | Georgia Southern |

=== Sacks ===
Career
| Rank | Player | Sacks | Years |
|---|---|---|---|
| 1 | Hardrick Willis | 12.0 | 2017 2019 2020 2021 |
| 2 | Dontae Wilson | 11.5 | 2017 2018 2019 2020 2021 |
| | Javon Denis | 11.5 | 2020 2021 2022 2023 |
| 4 | Thomas Gore | 11.0 | 2019 2020 2021 2022 |
| 5 | Jordan Strachan | 10.5 | 2018 2019 2020 |
| | Xavier Esqillion | 10.5 | 2026 |
| 7 | Christo Bilukidi | 10.0 | 2010 2011 |
| 8 | Jeffery Clark | 9.0 | 2020 2021 2022 |
| | Blake Carroll | 9.0 | 2018 2019 2020 2021 2022 |
| 10 | Shamar McCollum | 8.5 | 2021 2022 2023 |
| | Kevin Swint | 8.5 | 2023 2024 |

Single season
| Rank | Player | Sacks | Year |
|---|---|---|---|
| 1 | Jordan Strachan | 10.5 | 2020 |
| | Xavier Esqillion | 10.5 | 2026 |
| 3 | Hardrick Willis | 6.0 | 2020 |
| | Jabriel Rhodes-Nelson | 6.0 | 2026 |
| 5 | Blake Carroll | 5.5 | 2021 |
| 6 | Christo Bilukidi | 5.0 | 2010 |
| | Jamil Muhammad | 5.0 | 2021 |
| | Thomas Gore | 5.0 | 2022 |
| | Javon Denis | 5.0 | 2023 |
| 10 | Hardrick Willis | 4.5 | 2019 |
| | Jeffery Clark | 4.5 | 2022 |
| | Shamar McCollum | 4.5 | 2022 |
| | Kevin Swint | 4.5 | 2024 |

Single game
| Rank | Player | Sacks | Year | Opponent |
|---|---|---|---|---|
| 1 | Jake Muasau | 3.0 | 2010 | Lambuth |
| | Xavier Esqillion | 3.0 | 2026 | Old Dominion |

== Kicking ==
=== Field goals made ===
Career
| Rank | Player | FGs | Years |
|---|---|---|---|
| 1 | Brandon Wright | 32 | 2016 2017 2018 2019 |
| 2 | Wil Lutz | 31 | 2012 2013 2014 2015 |
| 3 | Liam Rickman | 28 | 2023 2024 2025 |
| 4 | Noel Ruiz | 26 | 2020 2021 |
| 5 | Samer Layous | 16 | 2026 |
| 6 | Iain Vance | 15 | 2010 |
| 7 | Michael Hayes | 12 | 2020 2021 2022 |
| 8 | Christian Benvenuto | 11 | 2011 2012 |
| 9 | Rogier Ten Lohuis | 8 | 2016 |

Single season
| Rank | Player | FGs | Year |
|---|---|---|---|
| 1 | Samer Layous | 16 | 2026 |
| 2 | Iain Vance | 15 | 2010 |
| 3 | Liam Rickman | 14 | 2024 |
| 4 | Noel Ruiz | 13 | 2020 |
| | Noel Ruiz | 13 | 2021 |
| 6 | Wil Lutz | 12 | 2015 |
| | Brandon Wright | 12 | 2017 |
| | Brandon Wright | 12 | 2019 |
| 9 | Michael Hayes | 11 | 2022 |
| 10 | Christian Benvenuto | 9 | 2011 |
| | Liam Rickman | 9 | 2023 |

Single game
| Rank | Player | FGs | Year | Opponent |
|---|---|---|---|---|
| 1 | Samer Layous | 4 | 2026 | App State |
| 2 | Iain Vance | 3 | 2010 | Lamar |
| | Noel Ruiz | 3 | 2020 | Troy |
| | Noel Ruiz | 3 | 2020 | Georgia Southern |
| | Noel Ruiz | 3 | 2020 | Appalachian State |
| | Noel Ruiz | 3 | 2021 | Troy |
| | Noel Ruiz | 3 | 2021 | Ball State |
| | Liam Rickman | 3 | 2023 | Coastal Carolina |
| | Samer Layous | 3 | 2026 | Kennesaw State |
| | Samer Layous | 3 | 2026 | UCF |

=== Field goal percentage ===
Career
| Rank | Player | FG% | Years |
|---|---|---|---|
| 1 | Iain Vance | 88.2% | 2010 |
| 2 | Noel Ruiz | 83.9% | 2020 2021 |
| 3 | Michael Hayes | 80.0% | 2020 2021 2022 |
| 4 | Liam Rickman | 70.0% | 2023 2024 2025 |
| 5 | Wil Lutz | 67.4% | 2012 2013 2014 2015 |
| 6 | Brandon Wright | 59.3% | 2016 2017 2018 2019 |
| 7 | Christian Benvenuto | 55.0% | 2011 2012 |
| 8 | Rogier Ten Lohuis | 53.3% | 2016 |

Single season
| Rank | Player | FG% | Year |
|---|---|---|---|
| 1 | Iain Vance | 88.2% | 2010 |
| 2 | Wil Lutz | 87.5% | 2014 |
| 3 | Noel Ruiz | 86.7% | 2021 |
| 4 | Noel Ruiz | 81.3% | 2020 |
| 5 | Michael Hayes | 78.6% | 2022 |
| 6 | Liam Rickman | 73.7% | 2024 |
| 7 | Wil Lutz | 66.7% | 2013 |
| 8 | Christian Benvenuto | 66.7% | 2012 |
| | Brandon Wright | 66.7% | 2019 |
| 10 | Brandon Wright | 63.6% | 2018 |
