= 2017 Georgia State Panthers football team =

American college football season

2017 Georgia State Panthers football

Cure Bowl champion

Cure Bowl, W 27–17 vs. Western Kentucky
- Conference: Sun Belt Conference
- Record: 7–5 (5–3 Sun Belt)
- Head coach: Shawn Elliott (1st season)
- Offensive coordinator: Travis Trickett (1st season)
- Offensive scheme: Spread
- Defensive coordinator: Nate Fuqua (1st season)
- Base defense: 4–2–5
- Home stadium: Georgia State Stadium

2017 Sun Belt Conference football standings
	Conf.			Overall
Team	W		L	W		L
Troy +	7	–	1	11	–	2
Appalachian State +	7	–	1	9	–	4
Arkansas State	6	–	2	7	–	5
Georgia State	5	–	3	7	–	5
New Mexico State	4	–	4	7	–	6
Louisiana	4	–	4	5	–	7
Louisiana–Monroe	4	–	4	4	–	8
Idaho	3	–	5	4	–	8
South Alabama	3	–	5	4	–	8
Coastal Carolina *	2	–	6	3	–	9
Georgia Southern	2	–	6	2	–	10
Texas State	1	–	7	2	–	10
+ – Conference co-champions; * – Ineligible for postseason play due to FCS-to-FBS transition rules

The 2017 Georgia State Panthers football team represented Georgia State University (GSU) in the 2017 NCAA Division I FBS football season. The Panthers were led by first-year head coach Shawn Elliott. He was hired in December 2016 ahead of the 2017 season. The season marked the first in which they played in the newly acquired Georgia State Stadium, a renovated Turner Field with artificial turf and a 22,000 person capacity. The season was the Panthers' fifth in the Sun Belt Conference and eighth since starting football. The Panthers finished the season 7–5, 5–3 in Sun Belt play to finish in fourth place. They received an invite to the Cure Bowl, where Georgia State defeated Western Kentucky for the Panthers' first bowl win in program history.

== Offseason ==
=== 2017 NFL draft ===
Panthers picked in the 2017 NFL Draft:

Round	Pick	Player	Position	Team
6	209	Robert Davis	WR	Washington Redskins

=== Recruits ===
As of December 21, 2016, the Panthers have a total of 20 recruits committed. Eight are three-star recruits.

College recruiting information
Name	Hometown	School	Height	Weight	40^{‡}	Commit date
Chris Sibilia; OT	Suwanee, GA	North Gwinnett High School	6 ft 6 in (1.98 m)	290 lb (130 kg)	–	Jul 19, 2016
Chris Sibilia; OT	Recruit ratings: Scout: 247Sports: ESPN: (68)					
Connor Robins; OT	Saint Augustine, FL	Pedro Menendez High School	6 ft 9 in (2.06 m)	330 lb (150 kg)	–	Jan 21, 2017
Connor Robins; OT	Recruit ratings: Scout: 247Sports: ESPN: (71)					
Jack Walker; QB	Madison, MS	Madison Central High School	6 ft 3 in (1.91 m)	210 lb (95 kg)	–	Jan 18, 2017
Jack Walker; QB	Recruit ratings: Scout: 247Sports: ESPN: (72)					
Jaylon Jones; S	Dacula, GA	Dacula High School	5 ft 11 in (1.80 m)	180 lb (82 kg)	–	Jan 15, 2017
Jaylon Jones; S	Recruit ratings: Scout: 247Sports: ESPN: (NR)					
Jalen Jackson; G	Loganville, GA	Grayson High School	6 ft 4 in (1.93 m)	300 lb (140 kg)	–	Jan 20, 2017
Jalen Jackson; G	Recruit ratings: Scout: 247Sports: ESPN: (73)					
Pat Bartlett; C	Newtown, PA	Council Rock High School North	6 ft 5 in (1.96 m)	305 lb (138 kg)	–	Jan 15, 2017
Pat Bartlett; C	Recruit ratings: Scout: 247Sports: ESPN: (73)					
Chris Bacon; S	Atlanta, GA	Westlake High School	6 ft 0 in (1.83 m)	181 lb (82 kg)	–	Jan 15, 2017
Chris Bacon; S	Recruit ratings: Scout: 247Sports: ESPN: (NR)					
Roger Carter; TE	Blythewood, SC	Blythewood High School	6 ft 3 in (1.91 m)	245 lb (111 kg)	–	Jan 29, 2017
Roger Carter; TE	Recruit ratings: Scout: 247Sports: ESPN: (69)					
Tamir Jones; WR	Norcross, GA	Norcross High School	6 ft 1 in (1.85 m)	194 lb (88 kg)	–	Feb 1, 2017
Tamir Jones; WR	Recruit ratings: Scout: 247Sports: ESPN: (75)					
Kerryon Richardson; CB	West Columbia, SC	Airport High School	5 ft 10 in (1.78 m)	160 lb (73 kg)	–	Dec 15, 2016
Kerryon Richardson; CB	Recruit ratings: Scout: 247Sports: ESPN: (NR)					
Trajan McQueen; LB	Charlotte, NC	West Mecklenburg High School	6 ft 1 in (1.85 m)	215 lb (98 kg)	–	Jan 16, 2017
Trajan McQueen; LB	Recruit ratings: Scout: 247Sports: ESPN: (NR)					
Camryn Johnson; WR	St. Matthews, SC	Calhoun County High School	6 ft 4 in (1.93 m)	205 lb (93 kg)	–	Feb 1, 2017
Camryn Johnson; WR	Recruit ratings: Scout: 247Sports: ESPN: (NR)					
Dontae Wilson; DT	Jefferson, GA	Jefferson High School	6 ft 0 in (1.83 m)	295 lb (134 kg)	–	Jan 30, 2017
Dontae Wilson; DT	Recruit ratings: Scout: 247Sports: ESPN: (NR)					
Victor Heywood; LB	Hoschton, GA	Mill Creek High School	6 ft 2 in (1.88 m)	195 lb (88 kg)	–	Oct 31, 2016
Victor Heywood; LB	Recruit ratings: Scout: 247Sports: ESPN: (NR)					
Deandre Applin; S	Milledgeville, GA	Georgia Military College	6 ft 1 in (1.85 m)	195 lb (88 kg)	4.89	Feb 1, 2017
Deandre Applin; S	Recruit ratings: Scout: 247Sports: ESPN: (NR)					
Jalen Wade; LB	Milledgeville, GA	Georgia Military College	6 ft 3 in (1.91 m)	225 lb (102 kg)	–	Jan 15, 2017
Jalen Wade; LB	Recruit ratings: Scout: 247Sports: ESPN: (NR)					
Malik Sumter; DT	Irmo, SC	Dutch Fork High School	6 ft 1 in (1.85 m)	284 lb (129 kg)	–	Jan 21, 2017
Malik Sumter; DT	Recruit ratings: Scout: 247Sports: ESPN: (68)					
Jhi'Shawn Taylor; LB	Cordele, GA	Crisp County High School	6 ft 3 in (1.91 m)	210 lb (95 kg)	–	Jan 20, 2017
Jhi'Shawn Taylor; LB	Recruit ratings: Scout: 247Sports: ESPN: (NR)					
Kevin Kwapis; OT	Council Bluffs, IA	Iowa Western Community College	6 ft 8 in (2.03 m)	315 lb (143 kg)	–	Jan 30, 2017
Kevin Kwapis; OT	Recruit ratings: Scout: 247Sports: ESPN: (NR)					
Hardrick Willis; DE	Jonesboro, GA	Mundy's Mill High School	6 ft 2 in (1.88 m)	230 lb (100 kg)	–	Jan 22, 2017
Hardrick Willis; DE	Recruit ratings: Scout: 247Sports: ESPN: (NR)					
Overall recruit ranking: Scout: 124 247Sports: 99 ESPN: 101
Note: In many cases, Scout, Rivals, 247Sports, On3, and ESPN may conflict in their listings of height and weight.; In these cases, the average was taken. ESPN grades are on a 100-point scale.; Sources: "2017 Team Ranking". Rivals.com.

== Coaching and support staff ==
Name	Position	Consecutive season at Georgia State in current position
Shawn Elliott	Head coach	1st
Travis Trickett	Offensive coordinator, quarterback	1st
Nate Fuqua	Defensive coordinator, outside linebackers	1st
Chris Collins	Assistant coach, safeties	1st
Skylor Magee	Assistant coach, defensive line	1st
Trent McKnight	Assistant coach, wide receivers	1st
Sam Shade	Assistant coach, cornerbacks	1st
Josh Stepp	Assistant coach, running backs, tight endss	1st
Cedric Williams	Assistant coach, offensive line	1st
Rusty Wright	Assistant coach, inside linebacker	1st
Ben McLane	Graduate assistant, offense	2nd
Steve Wojcikowski	Director of football operations	1st
Scott Holsopple	Head strength and conditioning coach	2nd
Bob Murphy	Associate AD, sports medicine and nutrition	2nd
Tim Davis	Equipment manager	2nd

== Schedule ==
Georgia State announced its 2017 football schedule on March 1, 2017. The 2017 schedule consisted of 6 home and away games in the regular season. The Panthers hosted Sun Belt foes Troy, South Alabama, Appalachian State, and Idaho, and traveled to Coastal Carolina, ULM, Georgia Southern, and Texas State. Georgia State did not play two Sun Belt teams this season, Louisiana and New Mexico State. The team played three non–conference games, one home game against Tennessee State from the Ohio Valley Conference (OVC), and two road games against Penn State from the Big Ten and Charlotte from Conference USA.

The scheduled home game against Memphis was canceled when the AAC bought out the contract between the schools for $1.1 million to reschedule a conference game between Memphis and UCF that was canceled during the second week of the season due to Hurricane Irma.

Date	Time	Opponent	Site	TV	Result	Attendance
August 31	7:00 p.m.	Tennessee State*	Georgia State Stadium; Atlanta, GA	ESPN3	L 10–17	24,333
September 16	7:30 p.m.	at No. 5 Penn State*	Beaver Stadium; University Park, PA	BTN	L 0–56	102,746
September 23	6:00 p.m.	at Charlotte*	Jerry Richardson Stadium; Charlotte, NC	Peachtree TV	W 28–0	11,029
October 7	6:30 p.m.	at Coastal Carolina	Brooks Stadium; Conway, SC	ESPN3	W 27–21	15,991
October 14	5:00 p.m.	at Louisiana–Monroe	Malone Stadium; Monroe, LA	ESPN3	W 47–37	12,578
October 21	2:00 p.m.	Troy	Georgia State Stadium; Atlanta, GA	ESPN3	L 10–34	15,388
October 26	7:30 p.m.	South Alabama	Georgia State Stadium; Atlanta, GA	ESPNU	W 21–13	12,125
November 4	3:00 p.m.	at Georgia Southern	Paulson Stadium; Statesboro, GA	ESPN3	W 21–17	18,722
November 11	4:00 p.m.	at Texas State	Bobcat Stadium; San Marcos, TX	ESPN3	W 33–30	14,017
November 25	2:00 p.m.	Appalachian State	Georgia State Stadium; Atlanta, GA	ESPN3	L 10–31	13,154
December 2	2:00 p.m.	Idaho	Georgia State Stadium; Atlanta, GA	ESPN3	L 10–24	14,163
December 16	2:30 p.m.	vs. Western Kentucky*	Camping World Stadium; Orlando, FL (Cure Bowl)	CBSSN	W 27–17	19,585
*Non-conference game; Rankings from Coaches' Poll released prior to the game

Schedule source:

== Game summaries ==
=== Tennessee State ===
	1	2	3	4	Total
Tigers	3	7	7	0	17
Panthers	0	3	0	7	10

- First game at Georgia State Stadium.

=== At Penn State ===
	1	2	3	4	Total
Panthers	0	0	0	0	0
Nittany Lions	14	21	14	7	56

=== At Charlotte ===
	1	2	3	4	Total
Panthers	0	14	0	14	28
49ers	0	0	0	0	0

=== At Coastal Carolina ===
	1	2	3	4	Total
Panthers	14	7	0	6	27
Chanticleers	0	7	0	14	21

=== At Louisiana–Monroe ===
	1	2	3	4	Total
Panthers	13	13	14	7	47
Warhawks	10	0	14	13	37

=== Troy ===
	1	2	3	4	Total
Trojans	7	14	10	3	34
Panthers	3	0	0	7	10

=== South Alabama ===
	1	2	3	4	Total
Jaguars	0	3	3	7	13
Panthers	7	7	0	7	21

=== At Georgia Southern ===
	1	2	3	4	Total
Panthers	7	0	7	7	21
Eagles	7	3	7	0	17

=== At Texas State ===
	1	2	3	4	Total
Panthers	10	3	10	10	33
Bobcats	7	7	3	13	30

=== Appalachian State ===
	1	2	3	4	Total
Mountaineers	0	10	14	7	31
Panthers	0	7	0	3	10

=== Idaho ===
	1	2	3	4	Total
Vandals	7	7	3	7	24
Panthers	7	3	0	0	10

- This was the Vandals' final game as an FBS member for the foreseeable future. Idaho football will downgrade to FCS, joining the school's other sports in the Big Sky Conference for 2018 and beyond.

=== vs Western Kentucky–Cure Bowl ===
	1	2	3	4	Total
Hilltoppers	7	3	0	7	17
Panthers	10	3	7	7	27

== Roster ==
2017 Georgia State Panthers football
Quarterback: 2 Jaquez Parks – (redshirt) junior (6'1, 205); 7 Conner Manning – (redshirt) senior (6'1, 205); 10 Ruggiero DeLuca – (redshirt) junior (6'3, 225); 11 Aaron Winchester – (redshirt) junior (6'2, 190); 16 Joshua Shim – (redshirt) freshman (6'0, 205); Running back: 1 Kendrick Dorn – (redshirt) senior (6'0, 205); 5 Tra Barnett – sophomore (5'10, 180); 8 Taz Bateman – (redshirt) junior (5'8, 190); 17 Glenn Smith – senior (6'1, 200); 23 Darius Stubbs – sophomore (5'10, 200) *; 24 Anthony Valverde – (redshirt) junior (5'10, 205); 25 Kyler Neal – (redshirt) senior (5'11, 215); 28 Demarcus Kirk – (redshirt) junior (6'0, 206); 43 Deandre Bowman – (redshirt) freshman (5'10, 180); 48 Maurice Lauchner – (redshirt) junior (5'9, 205); Wide receiver: 4 Jawan Nobles – sophomore (6'3, 180); 6 Jonathan Ifedi – (redshirt) freshman (6'0, 195); 14 Devin Gentry – sophomore (5'10, 190); 15 Todd Boyd – senior (5'11, 185); 18 Penny Hart – (redshirt) sophomore (5'8, 180); 80 Matlin Marshall – (redshirt) freshman (5'9, 190); 82 Chancellor Triplett – senior (6'0, 180); 85 Eric Elder – (redshirt) freshman (6'0, 185); 86 Bryson Duckworth – (redshirt) freshman (6'4, 215); Bryan Hypolite – (redshirt) junior (5'11, 180); Tight end: 46 Jacob Nesmith – (redshirt) senior (6'3, 270); 49 Brandon Hamilton – (redshirt) senior (6'2, 230); 84 Bill Teknipp – (redshirt) senior (6'4, 245); 88 Ari Werts – junior (6'4, 225); 89 Michael Kouassi – (redshirt) freshman . (6'4, 220); Placekicker: 93 Brandon Wright – (redshirt) sophomore (5'10, 180); 98 Jeff Hollingsworth – (redshirt) freshman (5'7, 175)	Offensive Lineman: 56 Alex Stoehr – G – senior (6'2, 299); 60 Jaylen Fareed – OL – (redshirt) senior (6'1, 310); 63 Davis Moore – OL – (redshirt) senior (6'4, 299); 65 Shamarious Gilmore – OL – (redshirt) freshman (6'3, 285); 69 Lucas Johnson – OL – junior (6'4, 285); 70 Chris Sibilia – OL – freshman (6'7, 292); 72 Gabe Mobley – OL – (redshirt) junior (6'2, 280); 73 Nick Meyer – OL – (redshirt) freshman (6'5, 260); 74 Sebastian Willer – OT – (redshirt) senior (6'5, 285); 76 Hunter Atkinson – OT – (redshirt) sophomore (6'5, 285); Defensive Lineman: 5 Mackendy Cheridor – DE – (redshirt) senior (6'5, 275); 30 Javonte Lain – DE – sophomore (6'2, 230); 50 Jamal Paxton – DL – (redshirt) junior (6'0, 280); 53 Terry Thomas – DL – sophomore (6'3, 265); 62 Will Cunningham – DL – (redshirt) senior (6'2, 270); 68 Mitchell Shea – DL – (redshirt) junior (5'10, 225); 91 Julien Laurent – DL – (redshirt) senior (6'4, 310); 92 DeQueszman Kelley – DL – (redshirt) senior (6'0, 295); 95 Marterious Allen – DE – junior (6'2, 270); 99 Clifford Amazan – DL – sophomore (6'2, 320); Punter: 48 Oliver Holdenson – (redshirt) sophomore (6'1, 210)	Linebacker: 3 Ed Curney – (redshirt) sophomore (5'11, 225); 13 Charlie Patrick – sophomore (6'0, 225); 32 Malik Ricks – senior (6'1, 235); 33 James Traylor – senior (6'3, 230); 34 Niemus Bryant – (redshirt) junior (6'0, 220); 39 Chase Middleton – junior (6'2, 235); 42 Trey Payne – (redshirt) senior (6'0, 225); 44 Michael Shaw – (redshirt) junior (6'4, 230); 59 Deshaun Faltz – (redshirt) senior (6'1, 215); T.J. Arnold – (redshirt) freshman (6'0, 210); Warren McWilliams – (redshirt) senior (6'0, 210); Defensive back: 9 Cedric Stone – CB – sophomore (5'10, 185); 10 Chandon Sullivan – CB – senior (5'11, 195); 16 Jerome Smith – CB – (redshirt) junior (5'10, 180); 20 Bryan Williams – S – (redshirt) senior (6'3, 212); 21 Antreal Allen – CB – senior (5'11, 190); 22 Trey Chapman – DB – (redshirt) freshman (5'11, 190); 26 Kendrec Grady – S – (redshirt) freshman (6'2, 215); 28 David West – DB – (redshirt) sophomore (6'1, 185); 29 B.J. Clay – CB – senior (6'0, 190); 30 Kyndall Phillips – DB – (redshirt) sophomore (6'0, 190); 31 Ronald Peterkin – S – (redshirt) junior (6'0, 185); 35 Leander Howard – DB – (redshirt) freshman (5'10, 180); 36 Khai Anderson – CB – (redshirt) sophomore (5'10, 185); 40 Remy Lazarus – DB – (redshirt) freshman (6'0, 190); 41 Blane Cannon – DB – (redshirt) freshman (5'9, 170); Long snappers: 54 Daniel Zeigler – (redshirt) senior (6'5, 240); 66 Seth-Patrick Holman – junior (5'11, 200)
