= Travis Trickett =

American football coach (born 1984)

Current position
- Title: Senior offensive assistant
- Team: West Virginia
- Conference: Big 12

Biographical details
- Born: May 29, 1984 (age 42); Hattiesburg, Mississippi, U.S.
- Education: West Virginia University (BS, 2007); Florida State University (MS, 2008)

Coaching career (HC unless noted)
- 2003–2006: West Virginia (SA)
- 2007: Alabama (GA)
- 2008–2010: Florida State (GA)
- 2011: Samford (TE)
- 2012–2015: Samford (OC/QB)
- 2016: Florida Atlantic (OC/QB)
- 2017–2018: Georgia State (OC/QB)
- 2019–2021: West Virginia (IWR/TE)
- 2022: South Florida (OC/QB)
- 2023–2024: Coastal Carolina (OC/QB)
- 2025–present: West Virginia (SOA)

Travis Trickett (born May 29, 1984) is an American football coach who currently serves as the senior offensive assistant at West Virginia University. He is the former offensive coordinator at Coastal Carolina University and the University of South Florida. He has also coordinated offenses at Samford University, Florida Atlantic University, and Georgia State University.

== Coaching career ==
=== Student/graduate assistant ===
Trickett's coaching career started as a student assistant at West Virginia under head coach Rich Rodriguez. While earning his degree, he had the opportunity to work with record setting quarterback Pat White.

Following his graduation in the spring of 2007, Trickett joined Nick Saban’s inaugural staff at Alabama as an offensive graduate assistant working closely with quarterbacks John Parker Wilson and Greg McElroy.

The following season, he moved on to joined Bobby Bowden’s staff at Florida State as an offensive graduate assistant from 2008 through 2010 working with the quarterbacks. During this time, Trickett helped mentor Christian Ponder and E. J. Manuel.

=== Samford ===
Trickett's first full-time coaching position was as the tight ends coach for Pat Sullivan and the Samford Bulldogs football team in 2011. The following season, offensive coordinator Rhett Lashlee departed for Arkansas State, and Trickett was promoted to offensive coordinator and quarterbacks coach. In his four seasons as the play-caller (2012–2015), Trickett coached 23 all-conference players, led by 2013 Southern Conference player of the year, Andy Summerlin. He helped guide the Bulldogs to five straight winning seasons, a Southern Conference championship in 2013, and a berth in the 2013 NCAA Division I FCS football playoffs.

=== Florida Atlantic ===
In 2016, Trickett was hired as the new offensive coordinator at Florida Atlantic by Charlie Partridge. Though the owls only won three games, Trickett’s offense set FAU season records for rushing yards, yards per carry and rushing touchdowns, and the most yards in a game. Partridge was fired following the season, and Trickett wasn’t retained by the new staff.

=== Georgia State ===
After Shawn Elliott was hired as the new head coach at Georgia State, he hired Trickett as his new offensive coordinator and quarterback coach. In his first season with the Panthers, in 2017, Trickett helped guide them to a school record seven wins, including the schools first bowl win. His offense set new school marks for completion percentage and fewest interceptions in a season, along with the most total yards in a game and the most points against an FBS opponent. Quarterback Conner Manning and wide receiver Penny Hart earned All-Sun Belt Conference honors and Hart led the league with a school record 74 receptions.

The following year, Trickett’s quarterback, Dan Ellington, ranked number 14 in the nation with only five interceptions thrown (292 attempts). Hart was also named all-conference for a third season, and finished his career as the fourth-leading receiver in Sun Belt Conference history.

=== Return to West Virginia ===
Prior to the 2019 season, Trickett was hired by Neal Brown as the inside receivers and tight ends coach at West Virginia. During his time with the Mountaineers, Trickett guided inside receiver Winston Wright Jr. to two All-Big 12 selections as he led the team in receiving in both 2020 and 2021. Trickett also helped coach one of the most improved offenses in the nation. The Mountaineers added more than 90 yards per game from 2019 to 2020 as more than a touchdown per game.

In 2021, Trickett was ranked among the top ten recruiters in the Big 12 Conference by 247Sports, one of two outside of the Oklahoma and Texas staff’s. He is especially well-known for his recruiting efforts in the Miami, Florida area.

=== South Florida ===
In January 2022, Trickett was announced as the new offensive coordinator for the South Florida Bulls football team. He replaced Charlie Weis Jr., whom took the same position at Ole Miss.

== Personal life ==
Trickett is a Hattiesburg, Mississippi native. His father, Rick Trickett is currently the offensive line coach at Jacksonville State. His youngest brother, Clint Trickett, is the former offensive coordinator at Marshall, and his younger brother, Chance, is a scout for the Los Angeles Rams.

Trickett and his wife, Tiffany, have three children: Maverick, Camilla, and Holden.
