= 2020 LendingTree Bowl =

2020 LendingTree Bowl may refer to:

- 2020 LendingTree Bowl (January), a bowl game following the 2019 season, between Louisiana and Miami (OH)
- 2020 LendingTree Bowl (December), a bowl game following the 2020 season, between Western Kentucky and Georgia State
