= 2020 Georgia State Panthers football team =

Georgia State University in the 2020 NCAA Division I FBS football season

2020 Georgia State Panthers football

LendingTree Bowl champion

LendingTree Bowl, W 39–21 vs. Western Kentucky
- Conference: Sun Belt Conference
- East Division
- Record: 6–4 (4–4 Sun Belt)
- Head coach: Shawn Elliott (4th season)
- Offensive coordinator: Brad Glenn (2nd season)
- Offensive scheme: Spread
- Defensive coordinator: Nate Fuqua (4th season)
- Base defense: 4–2–5
- Home stadium: Center Parc Stadium

2020 Sun Belt Conference football standings
| | Conf. | | | Overall |
| Team | W | | L | W | | L |
|---|---|---|---|---|---|---|
East Division
| No. 14 Coastal Carolina xy+ | 8 | – | 0 | 11 | – | 1 |
| Appalachian State | 6 | – | 2 | 9 | – | 3 |
| Georgia Southern | 4 | – | 4 | 8 | – | 5 |
| Georgia State | 4 | – | 4 | 6 | – | 4 |
| Troy | 3 | – | 4 | 5 | – | 6 |
West Division
| No. 15 Louisiana xy+ | 7 | – | 1 | 10 | – | 1 |
| South Alabama | 3 | – | 5 | 4 | – | 7 |
| Arkansas State | 2 | – | 6 | 4 | – | 7 |
| Texas State | 2 | – | 6 | 2 | – | 10 |
| Louisiana–Monroe | 0 | – | 7 | 0 | – | 10 |
Championship: Louisiana at Coastal Carolina (Canceled)
+ – Conference co-champions; x – Division champion/co-champions; y – Championship game participant; Rankings from AP Poll

The 2020 Georgia State Panthers football team represented Georgia State University (GSU) in the 2020 NCAA Division I FBS football season. The Panthers were led by fourth-year head coach Shawn Elliott. This was the Panthers' eighth season in the Sun Belt Conference, third within the East Division, and 11th since starting college football. They played their home games at Center Parc Stadium.

== Schedule ==
Georgia State had games scheduled against Alabama, Murray State, and Charlotte which were canceled due to the COVID-19 pandemic.

| Date | Time | Opponent | Site | TV | Result | Attendance |
|---|---|---|---|---|---|---|
| September 19 | 12:00 p.m. | No. 19 Louisiana | Center Parc Stadium; Atlanta, GA | ESPN2 | L 31–34 ^{OT} | 4,126 |
| October 3 | 12:00 p.m. | East Carolina* | Center Parc Stadium; Atlanta, GA | ESPNU | W 49–29 | 3,823 |
| October 15 | 7:30 p.m. | at Arkansas State | Centennial Bank Stadium; Jonesboro, AR | ESPN | L 52–59 | 5,496 |
| October 24 | 4:00 p.m. | at Troy | Veterans Memorial Stadium; Troy, AL | ESPNU | W 36–34 | 12,000 |
| October 31 | 12:00 p.m. | No. 20 Coastal Carolina | Center Parc Stadium; Atlanta, GA | ESPNU | L 0–51 | 3,642 |
| November 7 | 12:00 p.m. | Louisiana–Monroe | Center Parc Stadium; Atlanta, GA | ESPN3 | W 52–34 | 2,921 |
| November 14 | 2:30 p.m. | at Appalachian State | Kidd Brewer Stadium; Boone, NC | ESPN+ | L 13–17 | 2,100 |
| November 21 | 4:00 p.m. | at South Alabama | Hancock Whitney Stadium; Mobile, AL | ESPNU | W 31–14 | 5,224 |
| November 28 | 12:00 p.m. | Georgia Southern | Center Parc Stadium; Atlanta, GA (Modern Day Hate) | ESPN3 | W 30–24 | 4,523 |
| December 26 | 3:30 p.m. | vs. Western Kentucky* | Ladd–Peebles Stadium; Mobile, AL (2020 LendingTree Bowl) | ESPN | W 39–21 | 5,128 |
*Non-conference game; Rankings from AP Poll and CFP Rankings after November 24 released prior to game; All times are in Eastern time

Schedule source:

== Game summaries ==
=== Louisiana ===
Louisiana at Georgia State

| Team | 1 | 2 | 3 | 4 | OT | Total |
|---|---|---|---|---|---|---|
| • No. 19 Ragin' Cajuns | 0 | 7 | 14 | 7 | 6 | 34 |
| Panthers | 7 | 7 | 7 | 7 | 3 | 31 |

- Date: September 19, 2020
- Location: Center Parc Stadium
  Atlanta, GA
- Game start: 11:01 a.m. CDT
- Elapsed time: 3 hours and 43 minutes
- Game attendance: 4,126
- Game weather: 71 °F (22 °C) • Weather: Cloudy • Wind: 13 E MPH
- Referee: Kyle Olson
- TV announcers (ESPN2): Wes Durham (play–by–play), Roddy Jones (analyst), and Paul Carcaterra (sideline reporter)

Scoring summary
| 1 | 03:30 | GSU | Cornelius Brown IV 12-yard rush (Noel Ruiz kick) (7 plays, 70 yards, 2:22) | GSU 7–0 |
| 2 | 13:25 | GSU | Cornelius Brown IV 28-yard pass to Roger Carter (Noel Ruiz kick) (10 plays, 90 yards, 2:53) | GSU 14–0 |
| 2 | 01:33 | LA | Levi Lewis 18-yard pass to Chris Smith (Nathanael Snyder kick) (9 plays, 80 yards, 1:43) | GSU 14–7 |
| 3 | 10:49 | GSU | Marcus Carroll 2-yard rush (Noel Ruiz kick) (9 plays, 66 yards, 3:05) | GSU 21–7 |
| 3 | 06:15 | LA | Levi Lewis 4-yard pass to Kyren Lacy (Nathanael Snyder kick) (7 plays, 86 yards, 4:26) | GSU 21–14 |
| 3 | 03:02 | LA | Elijah Mitchell 59-yard rush (Nathanael Snyder kick) (5 plays, 77 yards, 2:16) | TIE 21–21 |
| 4 | 11:54 | LA | Trey Ragas 2-yard rush (Nathanael Snyder kick) (4 plays, 63 yards, 1:46) | LA 28–21 |
| 4 | 07:37 | GSU | Destin Coates 4-yard rush (Noel Ruiz kick) (13 plays, 75 yards, 4:17) | TIE 28–28 |
| 1OT | | GSU | Noel Ruiz 15-yard field goal (5 plays, 17 yards) | GSU 31–28 |
| 1OT | | LA | Elijah Mitchell 12-yard rush (4 plays, 25 yards) | LA 34–31 |

| Statistics | Louisiana | Georgia State |
|---|---|---|
| First downs | 23 | 26 |
| Total yards | 519 | 419 |
| Rushing yards | 240 | 223 |
| Passing yards | 279 | 196 |
| Turnovers | 2 | 2 |
| Time of possession | 28:44 | 30:10 |

| Team | Category | Player | Statistics |
|---|---|---|---|
| Louisiana | Passing | Levi Lewis | 21/37, 279 yards, 2 TDs, 2 INTs |
| Louisiana | Rushing | Elijah Mitchell | 16 carries, 164 yards, 2 TDs |
| Louisiana | Receiving | Dontae Fleming | 4 receptions, 81 yards |
| Georgia State | Passing | Cornelius Brown IV | 22/39, 196 yards, 1 TD, 1 INT |
| Georgia State | Rushing | Destin Coates | 34 carries, 150 yards, 1 TD |
| Georgia State | Receiving | Roger Carter | 2 receptions, 53 yards, 1 TD |

=== East Carolina ===
East Carolina at Georgia State

| Team | 1 | 2 | 3 | 4 | Total |
|---|---|---|---|---|---|
| Pirates | 7 | 6 | 3 | 13 | 29 |
| • Panthers | 21 | 14 | 0 | 14 | 49 |

- Date: October 3, 2020
- Location: Center Parc Stadium
  Atlanta, GA
- Game start: 12:02 p.m. EDT
- Elapsed time: 3 hours and 28 minutes
- Game attendance: 3,823
- Game weather: 65 °F (18 °C) • Weather: Sunny • Wind: 6 W MPH
- Referee: Marshall Lewis
- TV announcers (ESPNU): Mike Couzens (play–by–play) and Dustin Fox (analyst)

Scoring summary
| 1 | 14:54 | ECU | Warren Saba 28-yard interception returned (Jake Verity kick) (1 play, 0 yards, 0:06) | ECU 7–0 |
| 1 | 13:30 | GSU | Destin Coates 13-yard rush (Noel Ruiz kick) (5 plays, 75 yards, 1:24) | TIE 7–7 |
| 1 | 11:02 | GSU | Sam Pinckney 38-yard pass from Cornelious Brown (Noel Ruiz kick) (2 plays, 61 yards, 0:23) | GSU 14–7 |
| 1 | 07:19 | GSU | Jamari Thrash 22-yard pass from Cornelious Brown (Noel Ruiz kick) (9 plays, 61 yards, 3:07) | GSU 21–7 |
| 2 | 12:45 | GSU | Tucker Gregg 4-yard rush (Noel Ruiz kick) (7 plays, 77 yards, 3:03) | GSU 28–7 |
| 2 | 07:44 | ECU | Jake Verity 34-yard field goal (11 plays, 57 yards, 5:01) | GSU 28–10 |
| 2 | 05:26 | GSU | Sam Pinckney 13-yard pass from Cornelious Brown (Noel Ruiz kick) (5 plays, 44 yards, 1:37) | GSU 35–10 |
| 2 | 00:00 | ECU | Jake Verity 40-yard field goal (13 plays, 54 yards, 5:26) | GSU 35–13 |
| 3 | 00:05 | ECU | Jake Verity 48-yard field goal (7 plays, 29 yards, 3:09) | GSU 35–16 |
| 4 | 13:12 | GSU | Antavious Lane 34-yard interception returned (Noel Ruiz kick) (1 play, 0 yards, 0:12) | GSU 42–16 |
| 4 | 10:30 | ECU | Tyler Snead 31-yard rush (Noel Ruiz kick) (7 plays, 65 yards, 2:42) | GSU 42–23 |
| 4 | 08:07 | ECU | Blake Proehl 29-yard blocked punt returned (Jake Verity PAT failed) (5 plays, 21 yards, 2:23) | GSU 42–29 |
| 4 | 00:23 | GSU | Destin Coates 5-yard rush (Noel Ruiz kick) (6 plays, 37 yards, 2:38) | GSU 49–29 |

| Statistics | East Carolina | Georgia State |
|---|---|---|
| First downs | 19 | 21 |
| Total yards | 286 | 485 |
| Rushing yards | 50 | 247 |
| Passing yards | 236 | 238 |
| Turnovers | 3 | 3 |
| Time of possession | 33:05 | 26:55 |

| Team | Category | Player | Statistics |
|---|---|---|---|
| East Carolina | Passing | Holton Ahlers | 29/50, 236 yards, 3 INTs |
| East Carolina | Rushing | Tyler Snead | 1 carry, 31 yards, 1 TD |
| East Carolina | Receiving | Tyler Snead | 11 receptions, 105 yards |
| Georgia State | Passing | Cornelious Brown IV | 18/28, 238 yards, 3 TDs, 2 INTs |
| Georgia State | Rushing | Destin Coates | 23 carries, 113 yards, 2 TDs |
| Georgia State | Receiving | Sam Pinckney | 7 receptions, 134 yards, 2 TDs |

=== At Arkansas State ===
Georgia State at Arkansas State

| Team | 1 | 2 | 3 | 4 | Total |
|---|---|---|---|---|---|
| Panthers | 7 | 21 | 14 | 10 | 52 |
| • Red Wolves | 14 | 14 | 17 | 14 | 59 |

- Date: October 15, 2020
- Location: Centennial Bank Stadium
  Jonesboro, AR
- Game start: 7:31 p.m. EDT
- Elapsed time: 4 hours and 21 minutes
- Game attendance: 5,496
- Game weather: 60 °F (16 °C) • Weather: Mostly Cloudy • Wind: NNE 8 MPH
- Referee: Kyle Olson
- TV announcers (ESPN): Matt Barrie (play–by–play), Mike Golic Jr. (analyst), and Tera Talmadge (sideline reporter)

Scoring summary
| 1 | 12:58 | ARST | Reed Tyler 3-yard pass from Logan Bonner (Blake Grupe kick) (3 plays, 5 yards, 0:50) | ARST 7–0 |
| 1 | 04:34 | GSU | Cornelious Brown IV 35-yard rush (Noel Ruiz kick) (5 plays, 99 yards, 1:48) | TIE 7–7 |
| 1 | 03:20 | ARST | Dahu Green 49-yard pass from Layne Hatcher (Blake Grupe kick) (3 plays, 66 yards, 1:14) | ARST 14–7 |
| 2 | 12:11 | GSU | Blake Carroll 74-yard fumble returned (Noel Ruiz kick) (11 plays, 54 yards, 4:38) | TIE 14–14 |
| 2 | 06:00 | ARST | Jonathan Adams Jr. 42-yard pass from Logan Bonner (Blake Grupe kick) (7 plays, 81 yards, 2:03) | ARST 21–14 |
| 2 | 04:29 | GSU | Cornelious Brown IV 11-yard rush (Noel Ruiz kick) (4 plays, 75 yards, 1:31) | TIE 21–21 |
| 2 | 00:48 | ARST | Dahu Green 20-yard pass from Layne Hatcher (Blake Grupe kick); 11 plays, 75 yards, 3:41) | ARST 28–21 |
| 2 | 00:14 | GSU | Sam Pinckney 21-yard pass from Cornelious Brown IV (Noel Ruiz kick) (5 plays, 75 yards, 0:34) | TIE 28–28 |
| 3 | 13:30 | GSU | Sam Pinckney 36-yard pass from Cornelious Brown IV (Noel Ruiz kick) (2 plays, 39 yards, 0:30) | ARST 35–28 |
| 3 | -08:21 | ARST | Brandon Bowling 16-yard pass from Logan Bonner (Blake Grupe kick) (11 plays, 75 yards, 5:09) | TIE 35–35 |
| 3 | 06:21 | ARST | Lincoln Pare 8-yard pass from Layne Hatcher (Blake Grupe kick) (3 plays, 53 yards, 0:46) | ARST 42–35 |
| 3 | 04:44 | GSU | Tucker Gregg 7-yard rush (Noel Ruiz kick) (6 plays, 75 yards, 1:37) | TIE 42–42 |
| 3 | 02:36 | ARST | Blake Grupe 39-yard field goal (8 plays, 51 yards, 2:08) | ARST 45–42 |
| 4 | 14:54 | GSU | Sam Pinckney 31-yard pass from Cornelious Brown IV (Noel Ruiz kick) (10 plays, 75 yards, 2:42) | GSU 49–45 |
| 4 | 12:40 | ARST | Jonathan Adams Jr. 32-yard pass from Layne Hatcher (Blake Grupe kick) (8 plays, 85 yards, 2:14) | ARST 52–49 |
| 4 | 06:55 | GSU | Noel Ruiz 29-yard field goal (9 plays, 60 yards, 3:29) | TIE 52–52 |
| 4 | 04:23 | ARST | Lincoln Pare 22-yard pass from Roshauud Paul (Blake Grupe kick) (6 plays, 75 yards, 2:32) | ARST 59–52 |

| Statistics | Georgia State | Arkansas State |
|---|---|---|
| First downs | 25 | 34 |
| Total yards | 583 | 609 |
| Rushing yards | 269 | 58 |
| Passing yards | 314 | 551 |
| Turnovers | 1 | 1 |
| Time of possession | 24:19 | 35:41 |

| Team | Category | Player | Statistics |
|---|---|---|---|
| Georgia State | Passing | Cornelious Brown IV | 18/35, 314 yards, 3 TDs |
| Georgia State | Rushing | Tucker Gregg | 14 carries, 142 yards, 1 TD |
| Georgia State | Receiving | Sam Pinckney | 6 receptions, 146 yards, 3 TDs |
| Arkansas State | Passing | Layne Hatcher | 21/28, 332 yards, 4 TDs |
| Arkansas State | Rushing | Jamal Jones | 13 carries, 41 yards |
| Arkansas State | Receiving | Jonathan Adams Jr. | 15 receptions, 177 yards, 2 TDs |

=== At Troy ===
Georgia State at Troy

| Team | 1 | 2 | 3 | 4 | Total |
|---|---|---|---|---|---|
| • Panthers | 7 | 6 | 20 | 3 | 36 |
| Trojans | 7 | 14 | 0 | 13 | 34 |

- Date: October 24, 2020
- Location: Veterans Memorial Stadium
  Troy, AL
- Game start: 4:02 p.m. EDT
- Elapsed time: 3 hours and 40 minutes
- Game attendance: 12,000
- Game weather: 69 °F (21 °C) • Weather: Overcast • Wind: NW 3 MPH
- Referee: Kyle Olson
- TV announcers (ESPNU): Clay Matvick (play–by–play) and Rocky Boiman (analyst)

Scoring summary
| 1 | 10:23 | GSU | Rogers Carter 4-yard pass from Cornelious Brown IV (Noel Ruiz kick) (11 plays, 75 yards, 4:37) | GSU 7–0 |
| 1 | 00:58 | TROY | Khalil McClain 10-yard pass from Gunnar Watson (Evan Legassey kick) (8 plays, 87 yards, 3:04) | TIE 7–7 |
| 2 | 10:55 | GSU | Noel Ruiz 46-yard field goal (11 plays, 47 yards, 5:03) | GSU 10–7 |
| 2 | 06:07 | TROY | Reddy Stewart 35-yard interception returned (Evan Legassey kick) (3 plays, 6 yards, 1:16) | TROY 14–10 |
| 2 | 05:29 | TROY | Shakel Brown 21-yard fumble returned (Evan Legassey kick) (2 plays, -4 yards, 0:38) | TROY 21–10 |
| 2 | 00:39 | GSU | Noel Ruiz 31-yard field goal (10 plays, 62 yards, 4:50) | TROY 21–13 |
| 3 | 09:02 | GSU | Tucker Gregg 27-yard rush (Noel Ruiz kick) (7 plays, 58 yards, 2:34) | TROY 21–20 |
| 3 | 06:05 | GSU | Roger Carter 36-yard pass from Cornelious Brown IV (Noel Ruiz PAT blocked) (6 plays, 72 yards, 2:01) | GSU 26–21 |
| 3 | 04:24 | GSU | Cornelious Brown IV 2-yard rush (Noel Ruiz kick) (3 plays, 8 yards, 0:50) | GSU 33–21 |
| 4 | 13:29 | TROY | AJ Lewis 2-yard pass from Jacob Free (Evan Legassey kick) (4 plays, 52 yards, 1:20) | GSU 33–28 |
| 4 | 06:54 | GSU | Noel Ruiz 37-yard field goal (14 plays, 55 yards, 6:35) | GSU 36–28 |
| 4 | 00:37 | TROY | Reggie Todd 11-yard pass from Jacob Free (two-point conversion attempt failed) (7 plays, 47 yards, 0:00) | GSU 36–34 |

| Statistics | Georgia State | Troy |
|---|---|---|
| First downs | 23 | 23 |
| Total yards | 379 | 447 |
| Rushing yards | 210 | 40 |
| Passing yards | 169 | 407 |
| Turnovers | 3 | 4 |
| Time of possession | 37:42 | 22:18 |

| Team | Category | Player | Statistics |
|---|---|---|---|
| Georgia State | Passing | Cornelious Brown IV | 20/30, 169 yards, 2 TDs, 1 INT |
| Georgia State | Rushing | Destin Coates | 25 carries, 115 yards |
| Georgia State | Receiving | Roger Carter | 7 receptions, 72 yards, 2 TDs |
| Troy | Passing | Jacob Free | 24/38, 329 yards, 2 TDs, 2 INTs |
| Troy | Rushing | Kimani Vidal | 7 carries, 24 yards |
| Troy | Receiving | Reggie Todd | 8 receptions, 130 yards, 1 TD |

=== Coastal Carolina ===
Coastal Carolina at Georgia State

| Team | 1 | 2 | 3 | 4 | Total |
|---|---|---|---|---|---|
| • No. 20 Chanticleers | 7 | 27 | 14 | 3 | 51 |
| Panthers | 0 | 0 | 0 | 0 | 0 |

- Date: October 31, 2020
- Location: Center Parc Stadium
  Atlanta, GA
- Game start: 12:02 p.m. EDT
- Elapsed time: 2 hours and 53 minutes
- Game attendance: 3,642
- Game weather: 56 °F (13 °C) • Weather: Sunny • Wind: W 12 MPH
- Referee: Wayne Winkler
- TV announcers (ESPNU): Mike Corey (play–by–play) and Jay Walker (analyst)

Scoring summary
| 1 | 08:14 | CCU | Jaivon Heiligh 35-yard pass from Grayson McCall (Massimo Biscardi kick) (6 plays, 70 yards, 2:46) | CCU 7–0 |
| 2 | 11:39 | CCU | C. J. Marable 18-yard pass from Grayson McCall (Massimo Biscardi kick) (7 plays, 71 yards, 3:41) | CCU 14–0 |
| 2 | 10:39 | CCU | Reese White 13-yard rush (Massimo Biscardi PAT failed) (2 plays, 26 yards, 0:41) | CCU 20–0 |
| 2 | 06:32 | CCU | Jaivon Heiligh 10-yard pass from Grayson McCall (Massimo Biscardi kick) (5 plays, 52 yards, 2:09) | CCU 27–0 |
| 2 | 00:50 | CCU | Grayson McCall 2-yard rush (Massimo Biscardi kick) (10 plays, 48 yards, 4:25) | CCU 34–0 |
| 3 | 09:12 | CCU | C. J. Marable 2-yard rush (Massimo Biscardi kick) (10 plays, 65 yards, 5:48) | CCU 41–0 |
| 3 | 03:33 | CCU | Kameron Brown 12-yard pass from Grayson McCall (Massimo Biscardi kick) (7 plays, 49 yards, 3:20) | CCU 48–0 |
| 4 | 13:57 | CCU | Massimo Biscardi 24-yard field goal (7 plays, 44 yards, 3:05) | CCU 51–0 |

| Statistics | Coastal Carolina | Georgia State |
|---|---|---|
| First downs | 30 | 5 |
| Total yards | 530 | 106 |
| Rushing yards | 250 | 76 |
| Passing yards | 280 | 30 |
| Turnovers | 1 | 2 |
| Time of possession | 41:04 | 18:56 |

| Team | Category | Player | Statistics |
|---|---|---|---|
| Coastal Carolina | Passing | Grayson McCall | 18/24, 254 yards, 4 TDs |
| Coastal Carolina | Rushing | C. J. Marable | 10 carries, 71 yards, 1 TD |
| Coastal Carolina | Receiving | Jaivon Heiligh | 5 receptions, 81 yards, 2 TDs |
| Georgia State | Passing | Cornelious Brown IV | 6/10, 30 yards, 1 INT |
| Georgia State | Rushing | Destin Coates | 11 carries, 56 yards |
| Georgia State | Receiving | Sam Pinckney | 2 receptions, 15 yards |

=== Louisiana–Monroe ===
Louisiana–Monroe at Georgia State

| Team | 1 | 2 | 3 | 4 | Total |
|---|---|---|---|---|---|
| Warhawks | 7 | 7 | 6 | 14 | 34 |
| • Panthers | 21 | 21 | 3 | 7 | 52 |

- Date: November 7, 2020
- Location: Center Parc Stadium
  Atlanta, GA
- Game start: 12:02 p.m. EST
- Elapsed time: 3 hours and 20 minutes
- Game attendance: 2,921
- Game weather: 70 °F (21 °C) • Weather: Cloudy • Wind: E 12 MPH
- Referee: T. Livingston
- TV announcers (ESPN3): Chris Sylvester (play–by–play) and Sam Crenshaw (analyst)

Scoring summary
| 1 | 12:34 | GSU | Roger Carter 4-yard pass from Cornelious Brown IV (Noel Ruiz kick) (6 plays, 75 yards, 2:26) | GSU 7–0 |
| 1 | 08:44 | GSU | Cornelious Brown IV 3-yard rush (Noel Ruiz kick) (6 plays, 37 yards, 1:48) | GSU 14–0 |
| 1 | 05:16 | GSU | Cornelious McCoy 18-yard pass from Cornelious Brown IV (Noel Ruiz kick) (7 plays, 28 yards, 2:51) | GSU 21–0 |
| 1 | 00:46 | ULM | Perry Carter Jr. 2-yard rush (Davis Hughes kick) (11 plays, 75 yards, 4:30) | GSU 21–7 |
| 2 | 09:19 | GSU | Cornelious McCoy 18-yard pass from Cornelious Brown IV (Noel Ruiz kick) (11 plays, 60 yards, 3:16) | GSU 28–7 |
| 2 | 08:08 | GSU | Destin Coates 3-yard rush (Noel Ruiz kick) (2 plays, 35 yards, 0:26) | GSU 35–7 |
| 2 | 06:03 | ULM | Perry Carter Jr. 50-yard pass from Jeremy Hunt (Davis Hughes kick) (4 plays, 75 yards, 2:05) | GSU 35–14 |
| 2 | 01:27 | GSU | Destin Coates 1-yard rush (Noel Ruiz kick) (11 plays, 78 yards, 4:36) | GSU 42–14 |
| 3 | 08:41 | ULM | Kaydn Roach 19-yard rush (Davis Hughes PAT failed) (9 plays, 67 yards, 3:46) | GSU 42–20 |
| 3 | 02:58 | GSU | Noel Ruiz 22-yard field goal (13 plays, 72 yards, 5:43) | GSU 45–20 |
| 4 | 14:55 | ULM | Charles Norman 4-yard pass from Jeremy Hunt (Davis Hughes kick) (7 plays, 75 yards, 3:03) | GSU 45–27 |
| 4 | 09:58 | GSU | Marcus Carroll 5-yard rush (Noel Ruiz kick) (7 plays, 61 yards, 3:24) | GSU 52–27 |
| 4 | 06:44 | ULM | Perry Carter Jr. 39-yard pass from Jeremy Hunt (Davis Hughes kick) (7 plays, 75 yards, 3:14) | GSU 52–34 |

| Statistics | Louisiana–Monroe | Georgia State |
|---|---|---|
| First downs | 23 | 23 |
| Total yards | 424 | 504 |
| Rushing yards | 85 | 263 |
| Passing yards | 339 | 241 |
| Turnovers | 3 | 1 |
| Time of possession | 28:16 | 31:44 |

| Team | Category | Player | Statistics |
|---|---|---|---|
| Louisiana–Monroe | Passing | Jeremy Hunt | 26/39, 339 yards, 3 TDs |
| Louisiana–Monroe | Rushing | Kadyn Roach | 8 carries, 34 yards, 1 TD |
| Louisiana–Monroe | Receiving | Perry Carter Jr. | 4 receptions, 124 yards, 2 TDs |
| Georgia State | Passing | Cornelious Brown IV | 20/32, 241 yards, 3 TDs |
| Georgia State | Rushing | Destin Coates | 20 carries, 102 yards, 2 TDs |
| Georgia State | Receiving | Cornelious McCoy | 7 receptions, 118 yards, 2 TDs |

=== At Appalachian State ===
Georgia State at Appalachian State

| Team | 1 | 2 | 3 | 4 | Total |
|---|---|---|---|---|---|
| Panthers | 7 | 3 | 0 | 3 | 13 |
| • RV Mountaineers | 3 | 0 | 7 | 7 | 17 |

- Date: November 14, 2020
- Location: Kidd Brewer Stadium
  Boone, NC
- Game start: 2:30 p.m. EST
- Elapsed time: 3 hours and 8 minutes
- Game attendance: 2,100
- Game weather: 54 °F (12 °C) • Weather: Sunny and Clear • Wind: Light
- Referee: Marshall Lewis
- TV announcers (ESPN3): Harrison Battle (play–by–play) and Stan Lewter (analyst)

Scoring summary
| 1 | 10:17 | GSU | Sam Pinckney 19-yard pass from Cornelious Brown IV (Noel Ruiz kick) (13 plays, 75 yards, 4:43) | GSU 7–0 |
| 1 | 02:53 | APST | Chandler Staton 21-yard field goal (12 plays, 46 yards, 5:06) | GSU 7–3 |
| 2 | 00:11 | GSU | Noel Ruiz 23-yard field goal (9 plays, 64 yards, 1:28) | GSU 10–3 |
| 3 | 00:46 | APST | Henry Pearson 9-yard pass from Zac Thomas (Chandler Staton kick) (6 plays, 80 yards, 2:34) | TIE 10–10 |
| 4 | 12:29 | GSU | Noel Ruiz 32-yard field goal (9 plays, 60 yards, 3:17) | GSU 13–10 |
| 4 | 04:55 | APST | Camerun Peoples 10-yard rush (Chandler Staton kick) (11 plays, 77 yards, 4:33) | APST 17–13 |

| Statistics | Georgia State | Appalachian State |
|---|---|---|
| First downs | 16 | 19 |
| Total yards | 300 | 310 |
| Rushing yards | 148 | 131 |
| Passing yards | 152 | 179 |
| Turnovers | 1 | 1 |
| Time of possession | 25:25 | 34:35 |

| Team | Category | Player | Statistics |
|---|---|---|---|
| Georgia State | Passing | Cornelious Brown IV | 11/33, 152 yards, 1 TD |
| Georgia State | Rushing | Tucker Gregg | 10 carries, 85 yards |
| Georgia State | Receiving | Sam Pinckney | 4 receptions, 74 yards, 1 TD |
| Appalachian State | Passing | Zac Thomas | 16/22, 146 yards, 1 TD, 1 INT |
| Appalachian State | Rushing | Camerun Peoples | 17 carries, 67 yards, 1 TD |
| Appalachian State | Receiving | Malik Williams | 3 receptions, 60 yards |

=== At South Alabama ===
Georgia State at South Alabama

| Team | 1 | 2 | 3 | 4 | Total |
|---|---|---|---|---|---|
| • Panthers | 0 | 7 | 14 | 10 | 31 |
| Jaguars | 7 | 0 | 7 | 0 | 14 |

- Date: November 21, 2020
- Location: Hancock Whitney Stadium
  Mobile, AL
- Game start: 3:30 p.m. EST
- Elapsed time: 3 hours and 25 minutes
- Game attendance: 5,224
- Game weather: 76 °F (24 °C) • Weather: Mostly Cloudy • Wind: ESE 7 MPH
- Referee: Kyle Olson
- TV announcers (ESPNU): Mike Couzens (play–by–play) and Rocky Boiman (analyst)

Scoring summary
| 1 | 13:05 | USA | Carlos Davis 17-yard rush (Diego Guajardo kick) (4 plays, 34 yards, 1:43) | USA 7-0 |
| 2 | 13:25 | GSU | Cornelious Brown IV 1-yard rush (Michael Hayes Kick) (15 plays, 96 yards, 6:28) | TIE 7-7 |
| 3 | 6:11 | USA | Jared Wilson 7-yard rush (Diego Guajardo kick) (8 plays, 70 yards, 1:32) | USA 14-7 |
| 3 | 5:16 | GSU | Tucker Gregg 3-yard rush (Michael Hayes kick) (3 plays, 75 yards, 0:55) | TIE 14-14 |
| 3 | 2:05 | GSU | Tucker Gregg 33-yard rush (Michael Hayes kick) (5 plays, 80 yards, 1:46) | GSU 21-14 |
| 4 | 11:03 | GSU | Michael Hayes 23-yard field goal (12 plays, 73 yards, 4:40) | GSU 24-14 |
| 4 | 5:33 | GSU | Tucker Gregg 1-yard rush (Michael Hayes kick) (5 plays, 55 yards, 3:06) | GSU 31-14 |

| Statistics | Georgia State | South Alabama |
|---|---|---|
| First downs | 19 | 19 |
| Total yards | 556 | 324 |
| Rushing yards | 222 | 113 |
| Passing yards | 334 | 211 |
| Turnovers | 4 | 1 |
| Time of possession | 29:16 | 30:44 |

| Team | Category | Player | Statistics |
|---|---|---|---|
| Georgia State | Passing | Cornelious Brown IV | 19/28, 334 yards, 3 INTs |
| Georgia State | Rushing | Tucker Gregg | 18 carries, 79 yards, 3 TDs |
| Georgia State | Receiving | Sam Pickney | 5 receptions, 176 yards |
| South Alabama | Passing | Desmond Trotter | 25/43, 211 yards |
| South Alabama | Rushing | Jared Wilson | 7 carries, 49 yards, 1 TD |
| South Alabama | Receiving | Jalen Tolbert | 5 receptions, 75 yards |

=== Georgia Southern ===
Georgia Southern at Georgia State

| Team | 1 | 2 | 3 | 4 | Total |
|---|---|---|---|---|---|
| Eagles | 0 | 14 | 3 | 7 | 24 |
| • Panthers | 3 | 10 | 0 | 17 | 30 |

- Date: November 28, 2020
- Location: Center Parc Stadium
  Atlanta, GA
- Game start: 12:05 p.m. EST
- Elapsed time: 2 hours and 55 minutes
- Game attendance: 4,523
- Game weather: 62 °F (17 °C) • Weather: Sunny • Wind: SSE 8 MPH
- Referee: Wayne Winkler
- TV announcers (ESPN3): Matt Stewart (play–by–play) and Sam Crenshaw (analyst)

Scoring summary
| 1 | 05:55 | GSU | Noel Ruiz 35-yard field goal (5 plays, 36 yards, 2:26) | GSU 3–0 |
| 2 | 14:56 | GASO | Shai Werts 7-yard rush (Alex Raynor kick) (13 plays, 75 yards, 5:59) | GASO 7–3 |
| 2 | 12:00 | GASO | Logan Wright 63-yard rush (Alex Raynor kick) (3 plays, 69 yards, 1:30) | GASO 14–3 |
| 2 | 05:35 | GSU | Noel Ruiz 29-yard field goal (8 plays, 76 yards, 2:40) | GASO 14–6 |
| 2 | 00:46 | GSU | Cornelius McCoy 45-yard pass from Cornelious Brown IV (Noel Ruiz kick) (7 plays, 65 yards, 1:59) | GASO 14–13 |
| 3 | 12:08 | GASO | Alex Raynor 29-yard field goal (5 plays, 56 yards, 2:52) | GASO 17–13 |
| 4 | 14:56 | GASO | Logan Wright 5-yard rush (Alex Raynor kick) (3 plays, 37 yards, 1:01) | GASO 24–13 |
| 4 | 12:13 | GSU | Destin Coates 4-yard rush (two-point conversion pass failed) (8 plays, 75 yards, 2:43) | GASO 24–19 |
| 4 | 02:54 | GSU | Cornelious Brown IV 1-yard rush (Cornelious Brown IV two-point conversion pass to Sam Pinckney) (10 plays, 69 yards, 4:48) | GSU 27–24 |
| 4 | 01:53 | GSU | Noel Ruiz 35-yard field goal (4 plays, 4 yards, 0:18) | GSU 30–24 |

| Statistics | Georgia Southern | Georgia State |
|---|---|---|
| First downs | 13 | 22 |
| Total yards | 370 | 427 |
| Rushing yards | 296 | 55 |
| Passing yards | 74 | 372 |
| Turnovers | 2 | 2 |
| Time of possession | 30:48 | 29:12 |

| Team | Category | Player | Statistics |
|---|---|---|---|
| Georgia Southern | Passing | Shai Werts | 4/7, 67 yards |
| Georgia Southern | Rushing | Logan Wright | 8 carries, 143 yards, 2 TDs |
| Georgia Southern | Receiving | Khaleb Hood | 1 reception, 44 yards |
| Georgia State | Passing | Cornelious Brown IV | 28/39, 372 yards, 1 TD, 1 INT |
| Georgia State | Rushing | Destin Coates | 15 carries, 47 yards, 1 TD |
| Georgia State | Receiving | Sam Pinckney | 10 receptions, 126 yards |

=== Vs. Western Kentucky (LendingTree Bowl) ===
Western Kentucky vs. Georgia State

| Team | 1 | 2 | 3 | 4 | Total |
|---|---|---|---|---|---|
| Hilltoppers | 7 | 0 | 7 | 7 | 21 |
| • Panthers | 7 | 20 | 3 | 9 | 39 |

- Date: December 26, 2020
- Location: Ladd–Peebles Stadium
  Mobile, AL
- Game start: 3:30 p.m. EST
- Elapsed time: 3 hours and 26 minutes
- Game attendance: 5,128
- Game weather: 52 °F (11 °C) • Weather: Sunny • Wind: SE 4 MPH
- Referee: Mike Cuttone
- TV announcers (ESPN): Mike Couzens (play–by–play), Jay Walker (analyst), Dawn Davenport (sideline reporter)

Scoring summary
| 1 | 04:02 | WKU | Tyrrell Pigrome 2-yard rush (Brayden Narveson kick) (14 plays, 80 yards, 5:39) | WKU 7–0 |
| 1 | 00:08 | GSU | Destin Coates 11-yard rush (Noel Ruiz kick) (11 plays, 75 yards, 4:07) | TIE 7–7 |
| 2 | 09:50 | GSU | Sam Pinckney 26-yard pass from Cornelious Brown IV (Noel Ruiz kick) (11 plays, 82 yards, 4:07) | GSU 14–7 |
| 2 | 02:09 | GSU | Jamari Thrash 5-yard pass from Cornelious Brown IV (Noel Ruiz kick) (13 plays, 77 yards, 5:49) | GSU 21–7 |
| 2 | 00:08 | GSU | Cornelius McCoy 8-yard pass from Cornelious Brown IV (Noel Ruiz PAT blocked) (12 plays, 80 yards, 1:44) | GSU 27–7 |
| 3 | 11:27 | WKU | Gaej Walker 2-yard rush (Brayden Narveson kick) (8 plays, 64 yards, 3:35) | GSU 27–14 |
| 3 | 07:59 | GSU | Noel Ruiz 45-yard field goal (4 plays, 4 yards, 1:14) | GSU 30–14 |
| 4 | 11:19 | GSU | Noel Ruiz 29-yard field goal (14 plays, 85 yards, 6:52) | GSU 33–14 |
| 4 | 05:13 | GSU | Cadarrius Thompson 25-yard pass from Mikele Colasurdo (two-point conversion rush attempt failed) (2 plays, 27 yards, 0:41) | GSU 39–14 |
| 4 | 02:18 | WKU | C. J. Jones 2-yard rush (Brayden Narveson kick) (7 plays, 60 yards, 2:56) | GSU 39–21 |

| Statistics | Western Kentucky | Georgia State |
|---|---|---|
| First downs | 14 | 27 |
| Total yards | 284 | 484 |
| Rushing yards | 104 | 227 |
| Passing yards | 180 | 257 |
| Turnovers | 3 | 1 |
| Time of possession | 24:58 | 35:02 |

| Team | Category | Player | Statistics |
|---|---|---|---|
| Western Kentucky | Passing | Tyrrell Pigrome | 17/33, 180 yards, 2 INTs |
| Western Kentucky | Rushing | C. J. Jones | 5 carries, 57 yards, 1 TD |
| Western Kentucky | Receiving | Joshua Simon | 4 receptions, 84 yards |
| Georgia State | Passing | Cornelious Brown IV | 16/30, 232 yards, 3 TDs, 1 INT |
| Georgia State | Rushing | Destin Coates | 23 carries, 117 yards, 1 TD |
| Georgia State | Receiving | Cornelius McCoy | 5 receptions, 88 yards, 1 TD |
