= Chase Middleton =

American football player (born 1997)

Profile
- Position: Linebacker

Personal information
- Born: March 27, 1997 (age 29); Lilburn, Georgia, U.S.
- Listed height: 6 ft 2 in (1.88 m)
- Listed weight: 230 lb (104 kg)

Career information
- High school: Brookwood (Snellville, Georgia)
- College: Georgia State
- NFL draft: 2019: undrafted

Career history
- Houston Texans (2019)*; Atlanta Falcons (2019)*; Calgary Stampeders (2019)
- * Offseason or practice squad member only

Chase Middleton (born March 27, 1997) is an American former professional football linebacker. He played for the Calgary Stampeders of the Canadian Football League (CFL). Middleton played college football at Georgia State.

== College career ==
Middleton was a two year starter and four year letter-winner for the Panthers as a linebacker. He ended his collegiate career ranked sixth in program history with 191 career tackles. He was a part of the Georgia State program's first-ever bowl game win in the 2017 Cure Bowl.

== Professional career ==
Pre-draft measurables
Height	Weight	Arm length	Hand span	40-yard dash	10-yard split	20-yard split	20-yard shuttle	Vertical jump	Broad jump	Bench press
6 ft 2 in (1.88 m)	232 lb (105 kg)	32 5/8 in (0.83 m)	9 3/4 in (0.25 m)	4.65 s	1.60 s	2.67 s	4.38 s	31 in (0.79 m)	9 ft 4 in (2.84 m)	15 reps
All values from Pro Day

=== Houston Texans ===
Middleton was signed by the Houston Texans as an undrafted free agent after the 2019 NFL Draft. He was waived prior to Preseason.

=== Atlanta Falcons ===
On August 9, 2019, Middleton signed with the Atlanta Falcons and appeared in the final two preseason games. He was released on August 31, 2019.

=== Calgary Stampeders ===
On September 30, 2019, Middleton signed with the practice squad of the Calgary Stampeders. He appeared in two games before being released at the end of the practice squad expansion period.
