= Christian Veilleux =

Canadian American football quarterback (born 2002)

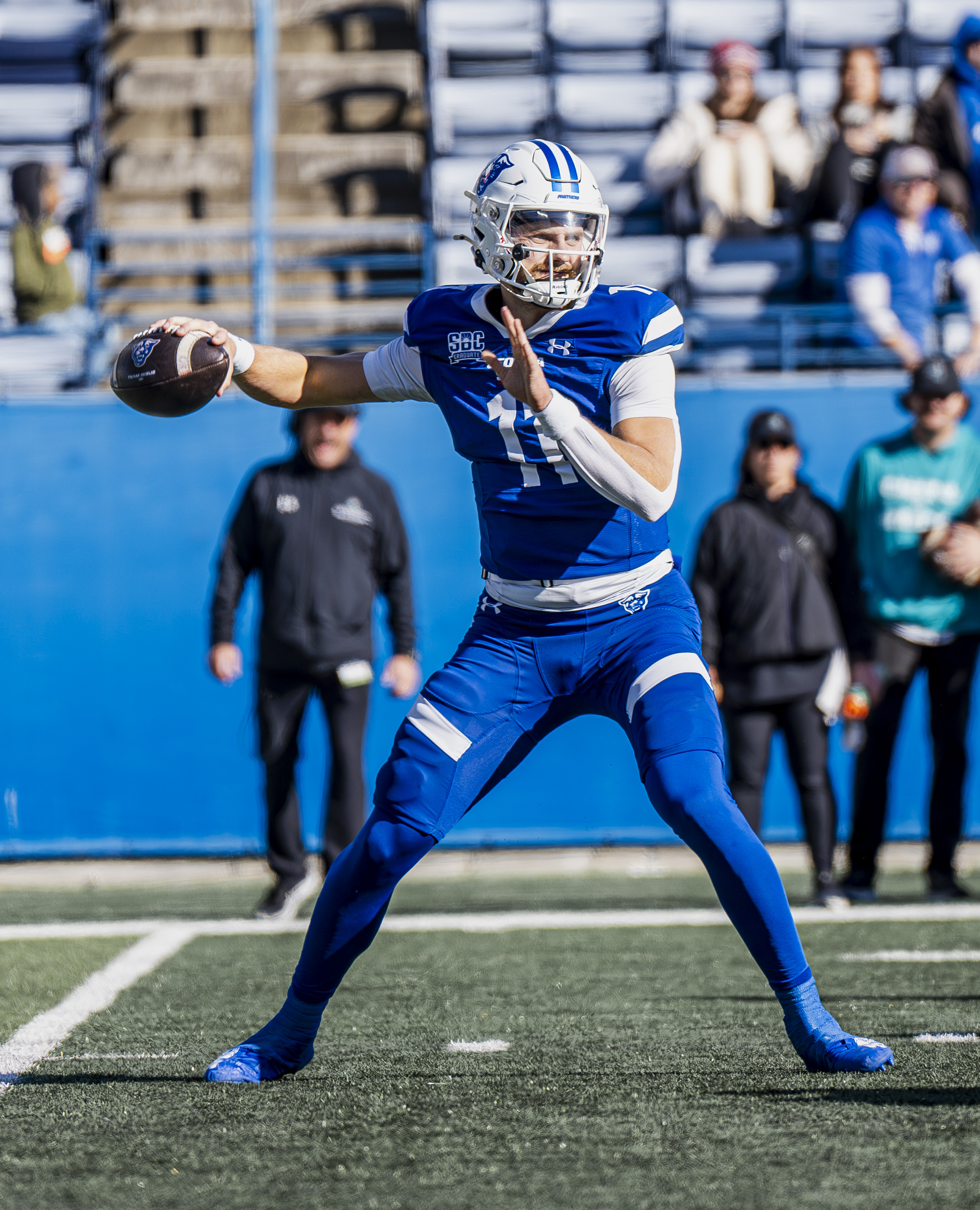

No. 11 – Alberta Golden Bears
- Position: Quarterback

Personal information
- Born: June 28, 2002 (age 24); Ottawa, Ontario, Canada
- Listed height: 6 ft 4 in (1.93 m)
- Listed weight: 220 lb (100 kg)

Career information
- High school: Bullis School (Potomac, Maryland)
- College: Penn State (2021–2022); Pittsburgh (2023); Georgia State (2024–2025)
- University: Alberta (2026–present)

Christian Veilleux (VAY-yur; born June 28, 2002) is a Canadian college football quarterback who plays for the Alberta Golden Bears. He previously played for the Penn State Nittany Lions, Pittsburgh Panthers and the Georgia State Panthers.

== College career ==
=== Penn State ===
Veilleux became the first Canadian quarterback to play for a Power Five school in 16 years when he decided to play for Penn State. Veilleux spent 2021 as Sean Clifford's backup. On November 29, 2022, Veilleux announced he had entered the transfer portal.

=== Pittsburgh ===
On December 18, 2022, Veilleux announced his commitment to Pittsburgh.

=== Georgia State ===
In 2024, Veilleux announced he was committed to Georgia State

=== Alberta ===
After going undrafted in the 2026 CFL draft, Veilleux signed with the Alberta Golden Bears.

=== Statistics ===
Season	Team	Games			Passing								Rushing			
Season	Team	GP	GS	Record	Cmp	Att	Pct	Yds	Y/A	TD	Int	Rtg	Att	Yds	Avg	TD
2021	Penn State	2	0	—	16	26	61.5	238	9.2	3	0	176.5	12	39	3.3	0
2022	Penn State	3	0	—	7	9	77.8	44	4.9	0	0	118.8	2	-4	-2.0	0
2023	Pittsburgh	7	5	1–4	94	184	51.1	1,179	6.4	7	8	108.8	24	-14	-0.6	0
2024	Georgia State	10	8	3–5	166	291	57.0	2,047	7.0	13	11	123.3	28	74	2.6	1
2025	Georgia State	3	2	0–2	41	86	47.7	509	5.9	3	3	101.9	9	53	5.9	0
Career		25	15	4–11	324	596	54.4	4,017	6.7	26	22	118.0	75	148	2.0	1

== Professional career ==
Pre-draft measurables
Height	Weight	Arm length	Hand span	Wingspan	40-yard dash	10-yard split	20-yard split	20-yard shuttle	Three-cone drill	Vertical jump	Broad jump
6 ft 3 3/4 in (1.92 m)	222 lb (101 kg)	31 1/8 in (0.79 m)	9 in (0.23 m)	6 ft 4 1/8 in (1.93 m)	4.72 s	1.60 s	2.75 s	4.13 s	7.05 s	32.0 in (0.81 m)	10 ft 1 1/8 in (3.08 m)
All values from Pro Day/CFL Combine
