= 2020 LendingTree Bowl (December) =

Postseason college football bowl game

- 22nd LendingTree Bowl
| Western Kentucky Hilltoppers | Georgia State Panthers |
| (5–6) | (5–4) |
| C-USA | Sun Belt |
| 21 | 39 |
| Head coach: Tyson Helton | Head coach: Shawn Elliott |
| | 1 | 2 | 3 | 4 | Total |
|---|---|---|---|---|---|
| Western Kentucky | 7 | 0 | 7 | 7 | 21 |
| Georgia State | 7 | 20 | 3 | 9 | 39 |
- Date: December 26, 2020
- Season: 2020
- Stadium: Ladd–Peebles Stadium
- Location: Mobile, Alabama
- MVP: Cornelious Brown IV (QB, Georgia State)
- Favorite: Georgia State by 3
- Referee: Mike Cuttone (Mountain West)
- Attendance: 5,128

United States TV coverage
- Network: ESPN
- Announcers: Mike Couzens (play-by-play), Jay Walker (analyst) and Dawn Davenport (sideline)

The 2020 LendingTree Bowl was a college football bowl game that was played on December 26, 2020, with kickoff at 3:30 p.m. EST (2:30 p.m. local CST) on ESPN. It was the 22nd edition of the LendingTree Bowl, and was one of the 2020–21 bowl games concluding the 2020 FBS football season. Online lending marketplace LendingTree was the game's title sponsor. It was also the final LendingTree Bowl played at Ladd-Peebles Stadium before the game moved to Hancock Whitney Stadium the following season.

== Teams ==
The 2020 LendingTree Bowl was contested by the Georgia State Panthers, from the Sun Belt Conference, and the Western Kentucky Hilltoppers, from Conference USA. The two teams had met twice previously, with the series tied at 1–1. The teams' last meeting was played in 2017; Georgia State won, 27–17 in the Cure Bowl.

=== Georgia State ===
Georgia State of the Sun Belt entered the bowl with an overall record of 5–4 (4–4 in conference play).

=== Western Kentucky ===
Western Kentucky of C-USA entered the bowl with a record of 5–6 (4–3 in conference play). They are one of a limited number of teams to enter a bowl game with a losing record.

== Game summary ==
2020 LendingTree Bowl

| Quarter | 1 | 2 | 3 | 4 | Total |
|---|---|---|---|---|---|
| Western Kentucky | 7 | 0 | 7 | 7 | 21 |
| Georgia State | 7 | 20 | 3 | 9 | 39 |

at Ladd–Peebles Stadium • Mobile, Alabama

- Date: Saturday, December 26, 2020
- Game time: 3:30 p.m. EST (2:30 p.m. CST)
- Game weather: Sunny • Temperature: 53 °F (12 °C) • Wind: SE 3 mph
- Referee: Mike Cuttone (Mountain West)
- TV announcers (ESPN): Mike Couzens (play-by-play), Jay Walker (analyst) and Dawn Davenport (sideline)
- ESPN game summary

Game information

First quarter

- (4:02) WKU – Tyrrell Pigrome 2 yard rush, Brayden Narveson kick (Drive: 14 plays, 80 yards, 5:52; Western Kentucky 7–0)
- (0:08) GSU – Destin Coates 11 yard rush, Noel Ruiz kick (Drive: 11 plays, 75 yards, 3:54; Tied 7–7)

Second quarter

- (7:50) GSU – Sam Pinckney 26 yard pass from Cornelious Brown IV, Noel Ruiz kick (Drive: 11 plays, 82 yards, 4:09; Georgia State 14–7)
- (2:09) GSU – Jamari Thrash 5 yard pass from Cornelious Brown IV, Noel Ruiz kick (Drive: 13 plays, 77 yards, 5:47; Georgia State 21–7)
- (0:08) GSU – Cornelius McCoy 8 yard pass from Cornelious Brown IV, kick blocked (Drive: 11 plays, 80 yards, 1:44; Georgia State 27–7)

Third quarter

- (11:25) WKU – Gaej Walker 2 yard rush, Brayden Narveson kick (Drive: 8 plays, 64 yards, 3:35; Georgia State 27–14)
- (7:59) GSU – Noel Ruiz 45 yard field goal (Drive: 4 plays, 4 yards, 1:15; Georgia State 30–14)

Fourth quarter

- (11:19) GSU – Noel Ruiz 29 yard field goal (Drive: 14 plays, 86 yards, 6:49; Georgia State 33–14)
- (5:13) GSU – Cadarrius Thompson 25 yard pass from Mikele Colasurdo, 2-point rush failed (Drive: 2 plays, 27 yards, 0:41; Georgia State 39–14)
- (2:18) WKU – C.J. Jones 2 yard rush, Brayden Narveson kick (Drive: 7 plays, 60 yards, 2:55; Georgia State 39–21)

=== Statistics ===
| Statistics | WKU | GSU |
|---|---|---|
| First downs | 14 | 27 |
| Plays–yards | 59–284 | 85–478 |
| Rushes–yards | 26–104 | 55–227 |
| Passing yards | 180 | 251 |
| Passing: comp–att–int | 17–33–2 | 16–30–1 |
| Time of possession | 24:58 | 35:02 |

| Team | Category | Player | Statistics |
|---|---|---|---|
| Western Kentucky | Passing | Tyrrell Pigrome | 17/33, 180 yards, 2 TD |
| Western Kentucky | Rushing | C.J. Jones | 5 carries, 57 yards, 1 TD |
| Western Kentucky | Receiving | Joshua Simon | 4 receptions, 84 yards |
| Georgia State | Passing | Cornelious Brown IV | 16/30, 232 yards, 3 TD, 1 INT |
| Georgia State | Rushing | Destin Coates | 23 carries, 117 yards, 1 TD |
| Georgia State | Receiving | Cornelius McCoy | 5 receptions, 88 yards, 1 TD |
