= Julien Laurent =

Canadian football player (born 1993)

Profile
- Position: Defensive lineman

Personal information
- Born: March 17, 1993 (age 33); Toronto, Ontario
- Listed height: 6 ft 3 in (1.91 m)
- Listed weight: 291 lb (132 kg)

Career information
- High school: Milford Academy (New Berlin, New York)
- College: Georgia State
- CFL draft: 2018: 1st round, 7th overall pick

Career history
- BC Lions (2018); Ottawa Redblacks (2019)
- Stats at CFL.ca

Julien Laurent (born March 17, 1993) is a Canadian football defensive lineman who is currently a free agent. He was most recently a member of the Ottawa Redblacks of the Canadian Football League (CFL). Laurent played college football at Georgia State. He was selected by the BC Lions with the seventh overall pick in the 2018 CFL draft.

== College career ==
Laurent was a two year starter and three year letter-winner for the Panthers as a defensive lineman. During his senior campaign he helped a defense set school records for fewest points per game allowed (24.75), fewest rushing yards per game (136.4), fewest yards per rushing attempt (4.13) and most sacks (24). He was a part of the Georgia State program's first-ever bowl game win in the 2017 Cure Bowl.

== Professional career ==
Pre-draft measurables
| Height | Weight | Arm length | Hand span | Wingspan | 40-yard dash | 10-yard split | 20-yard split | Vertical jump | Broad jump | Bench press |
|---|---|---|---|---|---|---|---|---|---|---|
| 6 ft 2 7/8 in (1.90 m) | 298 lb (135 kg) | 32 7/8 in (0.84 m) | 10 3/8 in (0.26 m) | 6 ft 6 1/2 in (1.99 m) | 5.46 s | 1.94 s | 3.11 s | 26.5 in (0.67 m) | 8 ft 5 in (2.57 m) | 23 reps |
All values from Pro Day

=== BC Lions ===
On May 3, 2018, Laurent was selected with the seventh overall pick in the 2018 CFL draft by the BC Lions, after trading with the Winnipeg Bombers. Laurent appeared in seven games during his rookie season, recording two tackles before being released in 2019.

=== Ottawa Redblacks ===
On August 20, 2019, Laurent was signed to the practice squad for the Ottawa Redblacks of the CFL. Laurent spent most of the season on Ottawa's practice roster before being activated in the final regular season game. He was waived by the Redblacks February 25, 2020.
