= Roger Carter (American football) =

American football player (born 1999)

Roger Carter Jr.
Profile
- Position: Tight end

Personal information
- Born: March 31, 1999 (age 27); Columbia, South Carolina
- Listed height: 6 ft 2 in (1.88 m)
- Listed weight: 250 lb (113 kg)

Career information
- High school: Richland County (Blythewood, SC)
- College: Georgia State
- NFL draft: 2022: undrafted

Career history
- Los Angeles Rams (2022)

Awards and highlights
- Third-team All-Sun Belt (2020); Second-team All-Sun Belt (2021)

Career NFL statistics
- Games played: 1
- Stats at Pro Football Reference

Roger M. Carter Jr. (born March 31, 1999) is an American professional football tight end. He played college football at Georgia State.

== College career ==
Carter was a four-year starter, five-year letterwinner, and Three-time All-Sun Belt Conference selection for the Panthers as a tight end. He finished his campaign as Georgia State's career leader in receptions and receiving yards by a tight end. Carter Finished ninth in GSU history in receptions, eighth in receiving yards and tied for sixth with 12 touchdowns. He amassed 96 receptions for 1,224 yards and 12 touchdowns during his collegiate career. He was a part of the Georgia State program's first-ever bowl game win in the 2017 Cure Bowl.

== Professional career ==
Pre-draft measurables
| Height | Weight | Arm length | Hand span | 40-yard dash | 10-yard split | 20-yard split | Vertical jump | Broad jump | Bench press |
|---|---|---|---|---|---|---|---|---|---|
| 6 ft 2 in (1.88 m) | 256 lb (116 kg) | 32 5/8 in (0.83 m) | 9 7/8 in (0.25 m) | 4.84 s | 1.70 s | 2.63 s | 37 in (0.94 m) | 9 ft 10 in (3.00 m) | 14 reps |
All values from Pro Day

Carter Jr. signed with the Los Angeles Rams as an undrafted free agent in 2022. During final roster cuts on August 30, Carter Jr. was released, but signed to the practice squad the next day. On September 26, Carter Jr. was elevated to the active roster. He made his debut the following day playing 12 snaps. He signed a reserve/futures contract on January 9, 2023.

On March 10, 2023, Carter was waived by the Los Angeles Rams.
