= Shawn Elliott (American football) =

American football player and coach (born 1973)

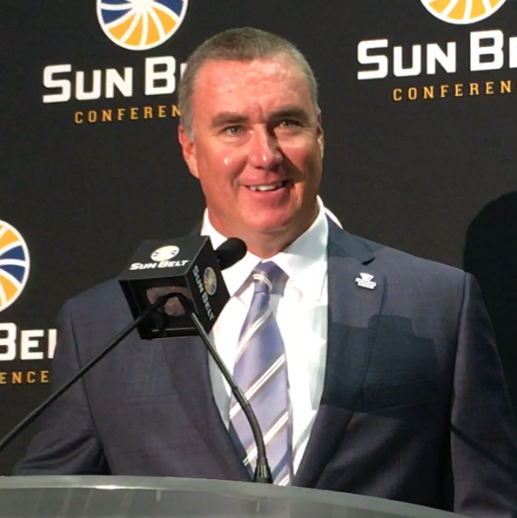
- Elliott at 2017 Sun Belt Media Day

Current position
- Title: Tight ends coach, run game coordinator
- Team: South Carolina
- Conference: SEC

Biographical details
- Born: June 26, 1973 (age 53); Camden, South Carolina, U.S.

Playing career
- 1992–1995: Appalachian State
- Position: Defensive end

Coaching career (HC unless noted)
- 1997–1998: Appalachian State (def. asst.)
- 1999–2000: Appalachian State (TE)
- 2001–2009: Appalachian State (OL)
- 2010–2011: South Carolina (OL/RGC)
- 2012–2015: South Carolina (co-OC/OL)
- 2015: South Carolina (interim HC)
- 2016: South Carolina (OL)
- 2017–2023: Georgia State
- 2024–present: South Carolina (TE/RGC)

Head coaching record
- Overall: 42–49
- Bowls: 4–1

Accomplishments and honors

Awards
- All-SoCon (1995)

Shawn Elliott (born June 26, 1973) is an American college football coach and former player who is currently the tight ends coach, run game coordinator, and interim offensive line coach at the University of South Carolina, a position he has held since the 2024 season. Elliott served as the interim head football coach at the University of South Carolina for the final six games of the 2015 season. He joined the South Carolina Gamecocks football coaching staff in 2010 as the team's running game coordinator under Steve Spurrier. He was later named the co-offensive coordinator and offensive line coach. A day after South Carolina head coach Spurrier's resignation, Elliott was elevated to the position of head coach on an interim basis. On February 15, 2024, Shawn Elliott addressed members of team and staff before officially resigning his position as head coach of Georgia State to become an assistant coach at South Carolina.

== Coaching career ==
After graduating from Appalachian State University in 1996, Elliott joined the team's coaching staff under Jerry Moore. He was part of a staff that led the Mountaineers to three straight NCAA Division I Football Championships, from 2005 to 2007. He remained with the team until after the 2009 season, when he joined the staff of South Carolina. On December 8, 2016, Georgia State hired Elliott as its head coach, replacing Trent Miles. Over the course of seven seasons under Elliott, Georgia State posted a 41–44 record, including 4–1 in bowl games. Elliott resigned as head coach on February 15, 2024, to return to South Carolina as tight ends coach.

== Personal life ==
A native of Camden, South Carolina, Elliott is married to Summer. They have two children.

Elliott's family has remained in Columbia the whole time he coached at Georgia State and he has a son playing high school football in Columbia and a daughter who's a high school cheerleader. The family situation influenced his move back to South Carolina: "We've made it work for seven years with my family still living in Columbia, and I even thought about not coaching this year. I had promised my daughter that I would be there for her senior year of high school and when this opportunity came up to go back to South Carolina and coach again, it was something I couldn't pass up. I've always loved South Carolina."

== Head coaching record ==
Year	Team	Overall	Conference	Standing	Bowl/playoffs
South Carolina Gamecocks (Southeastern Conference) (2015)
2015	South Carolina	1–5 (Note: Steve Spurrier resigned on October 12, 2015, after the first six games of the season, in which South Carolina went 2–4 overall and 0–4 in conference play. Elliott was named interim head coach the next day.)	1–3	T–6th (Eastern)	
South Carolina:		1–5	1–3		
Georgia State Panthers (Sun Belt Conference) (2017–2023)
2017	Georgia State	7–5	5–3	4th	W Cure
2018	Georgia State	2–10	1–7	5th (East)	
2019	Georgia State	7–6	4–4	3rd (East)	L Arizona
2020	Georgia State	6–4	4–4	3rd (East)	W LendingTree
2021	Georgia State	8–5	6–2	T–2nd (East)	W Camellia
2022	Georgia State	4–8	3–5	T–4th (East)	
2023	Georgia State	7–6	3–5	T–5th (East)	W Famous Idaho Potato
Georgia State:		41–44	26–30		
Total:		42–49			
