= Penny Hart =

American football player (born 1996)

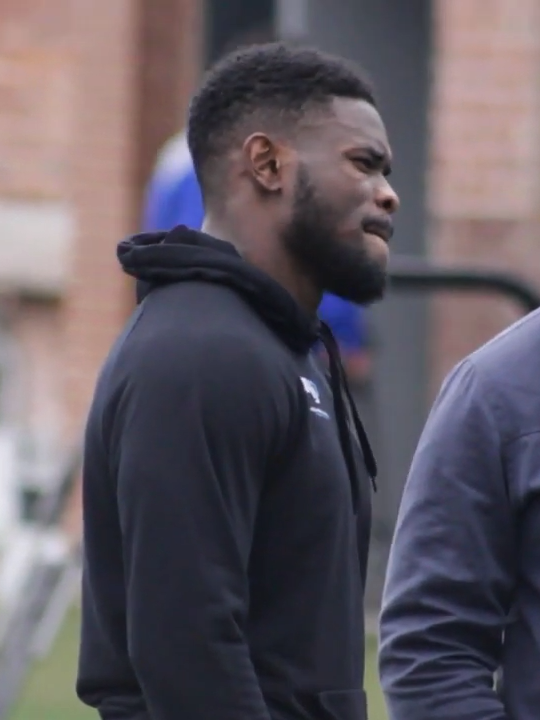
- Hart in 2019

Profile
- Position: Wide receiver

Personal information
- Born: July 5, 1996 (age 30); Roswell, Georgia, U.S.
- Listed height: 5 ft 8 in (1.73 m)
- Listed weight: 180 lb (82 kg)

Career information
- High school: King's Ridge Christian (Alpharetta, Georgia)
- College: Georgia State (2015–2018)
- NFL draft: 2019: undrafted

Career history
- Indianapolis Colts (2019)*; Seattle Seahawks (2019–2022); Atlanta Falcons (2023)
- * Offseason or practice squad member only

Awards and highlights
- Sun Belt Freshman of the Year (2015); 2× First-team All-Sun Belt (2015, 2017); Third-team All-Sun Belt (2018)

Career NFL statistics
- Receptions: 11
- Receiving yards: 82
- Stats at Pro Football Reference

Marjahn Penny Mathias Hart (born July 5, 1996) is an American professional football wide receiver. He played college football for the Georgia State Panthers and was signed as an undrafted free agent by the Indianapolis Colts after the 2019 NFL draft.

== Early life ==
Hart grew up in Roswell, Georgia and attended King's Ridge Christian School in Alpharetta, Georgia, where he played football, basketball, ran track, and baseball. In baseball, Hart was coached by former Major Leaguer Dallas McPherson and as a senior scored the winning run for King's Ridge in the 2015 Georgia High School Association Class A state championship game. In football, Hart was named first-team All-Region as a junior at running back and again as a senior as an athlete after playing running back and then moving to quarterback for the final three games of the season. In his final high school game, Hart rushed for 390 yards and eight touchdowns while also passing for 162 yards and another score.

== College career ==
Hart spent four seasons as a member of the Georgia State Panthers. In his first collegiate season, Hart had 71 receptions for 1,099 yards and eight touchdowns and was named the Sun Belt Conference Freshman of the Year and first-team All-Sun Belt, and was also named Freshman All-American by the Football Writers Association of America. Hart entered his sophomore season on the Fred Biletnikoff Award watchlist, but eventually had to redshirt after suffering a hamstring injury in training camp and then breaking his foot in the fourth game of the season against Appalachian State. As a redshirt sophomore, he caught a school record 74 passes for 1,121 yards and eight touchdowns and was again named first-team All-Sun Belt. The following season, Hart recorded 49 catches for 669 yards and two touchdowns, as well as 15 kickoffs returned for 299 yards and nine punts returned for 158 yards and a touchdown, and was named third-team All-Sun Belt. Hart declared himself eligible for the 2019 NFL draft, forgoing his final season of NCAA eligibility. Hart finished his collegiate career with 203 receptions for 2,960 yards, both second in Georgia State history, and a school-record 19 receiving touchdowns. Following his final season Hart received an invitation to participate in the 2019 Senior Bowl, where he impressed NFL scouts in practice and caught one pass for seven yards in the actual game.

== Professional career ==
Pre-draft measurables
Height	Weight	Arm length	Hand span	40-yard dash	10-yard split	20-yard split	20-yard shuttle	Three-cone drill	Vertical jump	Broad jump	Bench press
5 ft 8 in (1.73 m)	180 lb (82 kg)	31 in (0.79 m)	9 1/8 in (0.23 m)	4.63 s	1.58 s	2.68 s	4.75 s	7.64 s	33.5 in (0.85 m)	9 ft 3 in (2.82 m)	18 reps
All values from Pro Day

=== Indianapolis Colts ===
Hart signed with the Indianapolis Colts as an undrafted free agent on May 3, 2019. He was waived/injured on August 31, 2019, and reverted to the team's injured reserve list the next day. He was waived from injured reserve with an injury settlement on September 7.

=== Seattle Seahawks ===
Hart was signed to the practice squad of the Seattle Seahawks on October 22, 2019 following a workout with the team. He signed a reserve/future contract with the Seahawks on January 14, 2020.

On September 5, 2020, Hart was waived by the Seahawks and signed to the practice squad the next day. He was promoted to the active roster on September 8. Hart made his NFL debut on September 13, 2020 in the season opener against the Atlanta Falcons, playing one snap on offense and two on special teams. He was waived on December 21, 2020, and re-signed to the practice squad two days later. He was elevated to the active roster on December 26 and January 2, 2021, for the team's weeks 16 and 17 games against the Los Angeles Rams and San Francisco 49ers, and reverted to the practice squad after each game. On January 11, 2021, Hart signed a reserve/futures contract with the Seahawks.

On August 31, 2021, Hart was waived by the Seahawks and re-signed to the practice squad the next day. He was promoted to the active roster on September 7, 2021.

The Seahawks re-signed Hart on April 19, 2022.

=== Atlanta Falcons ===
On May 3, 2023, Hart signed with the Atlanta Falcons. He was placed on injured reserve on August 29, 2023. He was released on October 9.
