= 2017 Cure Bowl =

American college football game

2017 AutoNation Cure Bowl
- 3rd Cure bowl
Western Kentucky Hilltoppers	Georgia State Panthers
(6–6)	(6–5)
C-USA	Sun Belt
17	27
Head coach: Mike Sanford Jr.	Head coach: Shawn Elliott
	1	2	3	4	Total
Western Kentucky	7	3	0	7	17
Georgia State	10	3	7	7	27
- Date: December 16, 2017
- Season: 2017
- Stadium: Camping World Stadium
- Location: Orlando, Florida
- MVP: Georgia State QB Conner Manning
- National anthem: Girl Scouts Citrus Singers
- Referee: Mike Roche (American)
- Attendance: 19,585

United States TV coverage
- Network: CBSSN
- Announcers: Carter Blackburn, Aaron Taylor and Jenny Dell

The 2017 Cure Bowl was a post-season American college football bowl game played on December 16, 2017, at Camping World Stadium in Orlando, Florida, with kickoff at 2:30 p.m. local time. The third annual edition of the Cure Bowl, the game was one of the 2017–18 bowl games that concludes the 2017 FBS football season. Sponsored by automotive retailer AutoNation, the game was officially known as the AutoNation Cure Bowl.

The game featured Georgia State Panthers of the Sun Belt Conference and the Western Kentucky Hilltoppers of Conference USA. Georgia State beat Western Kentucky by a score of 27–17.

== Teams ==
=== Western Kentucky Hilltoppers ===
This was the Hilltoppers' fifth bowl game and their fourth consecutive. They previously won the 2014 Bahamas Bowl, 2015 Miami Beach Bowl and 2016 Boca Raton Bowl. This was their first Cure Bowl appearance.

=== Georgia State Panthers ===
This was the Panthers' second bowl and second Cure Bowl appearance in school history. They previously lost to San Jose State in 2015.

== Game summary ==
=== Scoring summary ===
Scoring summary

Quarter	Time	Drive			Team	Scoring information	Score	
Quarter	Time	Plays	Yards	TOP	Team	Scoring information	WKU	GSU
1	8:07	10	40	4:57	GSU	42-yard field goal by Brandon Wright	0	3
1	7:29	2	75	0:38	WKU	Deon Yelder 54-yard touchdown reception from Mike White, Ryan Nuss kick good	7	3
1	6:18	3	85	1:11	GSU	Demarcus Kirk 26-yard touchdown run, Brandon Wright kick good	7	10
2	14:18	4	5	1:36	WKU	38-yard field goal by Ryan Nuss	10	10
2	9:07	10	55	5:11	GSU	37-yard field goal by Brandon Wright	10	13
3	5:55	5	80	1:46	GSU	Roger Carter 42-yard touchdown reception from Conner Manning, Brandon Wright kick good	10	20
4	5:50	16	74	9:01	GSU	Kyler Neal 1-yard touchdown run, Brandon Wright kick good	10	27
4	2:34	11	87	3:16	WKU	Deon Yelder 4-yard touchdown reception from Mike White, Ryan Nuss kick good	17	27
"TOP" = time of possession. For other American football terms, see Glossary of American football.							17	27

=== Statistics ===
	1	2	3	4	Total
Hilltoppers	7	3	0	7	17
Panthers	10	3	7	7	27

Statistics	WKU	GSU
First downs	17	21
Plays–yards	61–349	71–419
Rushes–yards	21– -2	43–143
Passing yards	351	419
Passing: Comp–Att–Int	26–40–2	20–28–0
Time of possession	24:39	35:21

Team	Category	Player	Statistics
Western Kentucky	Passing	Mike White	26/39, 351 yds, 2 TD, 1 INT
Western Kentucky	Rushing	Jakairi Moses	7 car, 19 yds
Western Kentucky	Receiving	Deon Yelder	5 rec, 112 yds, 2 TD
Georgia State	Passing	Conner Manning	20/28, 276 yds, 1 TD
Georgia State	Rushing	Glenn Smith	23 car, 73 yds
Georgia State	Receiving	Roger Carter	4 rec, 85 yds, 1 TD
