= Georgia State Panthers football =

Georgia State University sports team

2026 Georgia State Panthers football team
- First season: 2010; 16 years ago
- Athletic director: Charlie Cobb
- Head coach: Dell McGee; 3rd season, 4–20 (.167)
- Location: Atlanta, Georgia
- Stadium: Center Parc Stadium (capacity: 25,000)
- NCAA division: Division I FBS
- Conference: Sun Belt
- Division: East
- Colors: Blue and white
- All-time record: 65–126 (.340)
- Bowl record: 4–2 (.667)
- Rivalries: Georgia Southern (rivalry); South Alabama; Kennesaw State
- Fight song: Fight Panthers, Panther Pride
- Mascot: Pounce
- Website: georgiastatesports.com

The Georgia State Panthers football team is the college football program for Georgia State University in Atlanta, Georgia. The Panthers football team was founded in 2010 and competes at the NCAA Division I FBS level. The team is a member of the Sun Belt Conference. The Panthers currently play at Center Parc Stadium, about ten minutes from GSU's downtown campus.

== History ==
=== Bill Curry era (2010–2012) ===
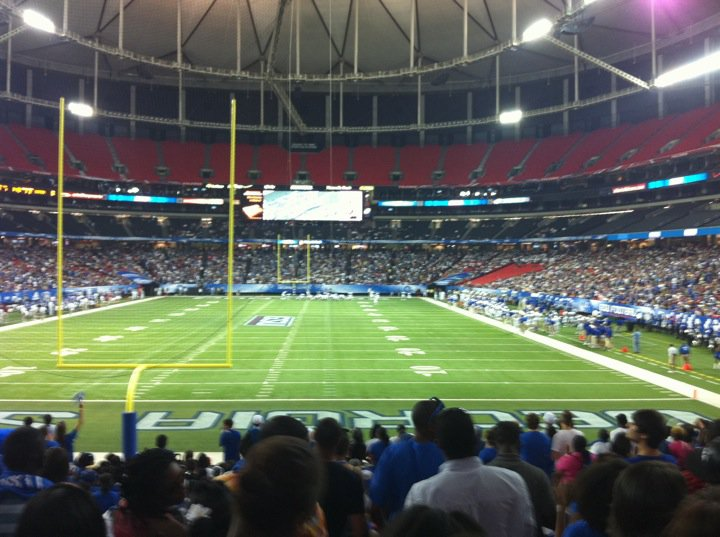
The crowd of 30,237 during the inaugural game against the Shorter University Hawks

In November 2006, a study commissioned by Georgia State was completed and submitted back to the school. It found Georgia State to be in a good position to begin a competitive football team, and based its remarks on the location and resources of the university. It estimated that total annual expenses by 2012 would be $3.1 million.

On April 15, 2007, former Atlanta Falcons head coach Dan Reeves was hired by Georgia State as a consultant.

On November 1, 2007, the university began discussing the possibility of adding football. It found that total costs would cost between $6.2 million and $33.8 million depending on several different factors, including whether a stadium would be built or a preexisting stadium would be used.

On April 17, 2008, Georgia State launched its football program. On June 12, 2008, former Georgia Tech, Alabama, and Kentucky head coach Bill Curry was named as the Georgia State head coach, working on a 5-year contract. This was followed by the hiring of John Bond as offensive coordinator, John Thompson as defensive coordinator, and George Pugh as assistant head coach, as well as Chris Ward and Anthony Midget.

On November 20, 2008, ground was broken for a downtown practice facility at 188 Martin Luther King Drive. The facility would eventually be expanded to include a 100-yard artificial turf field and a 50-yard natural turf field. The existing buildings were converted into facilities and offices for the football team.

On January 4, 2009, Mark Hogan, son of former Georgia Tech player Mark Hogan Sr., enrolled to play as wide receiver on scholarship, making him the first football player to receive a scholarship from Georgia State. The following month, the program signed its first recruiting class of 27 players, including the three-star running back Parris Lee.

On February 25, 2009, Georgia State named Cheryl Levick as athletic director. Levick left Maryland, where she had served as the school's executive senior athletic director. By June 11, the CAA announced that they Georgia State was joining the conference and would officially begin CAA play during the 2012 season.

The Panthers wouldn't play football until the 2010 season, and so the 2009 season was spent practicing at an NFL facility in downtown Atlanta. 71 players reported on August 14.

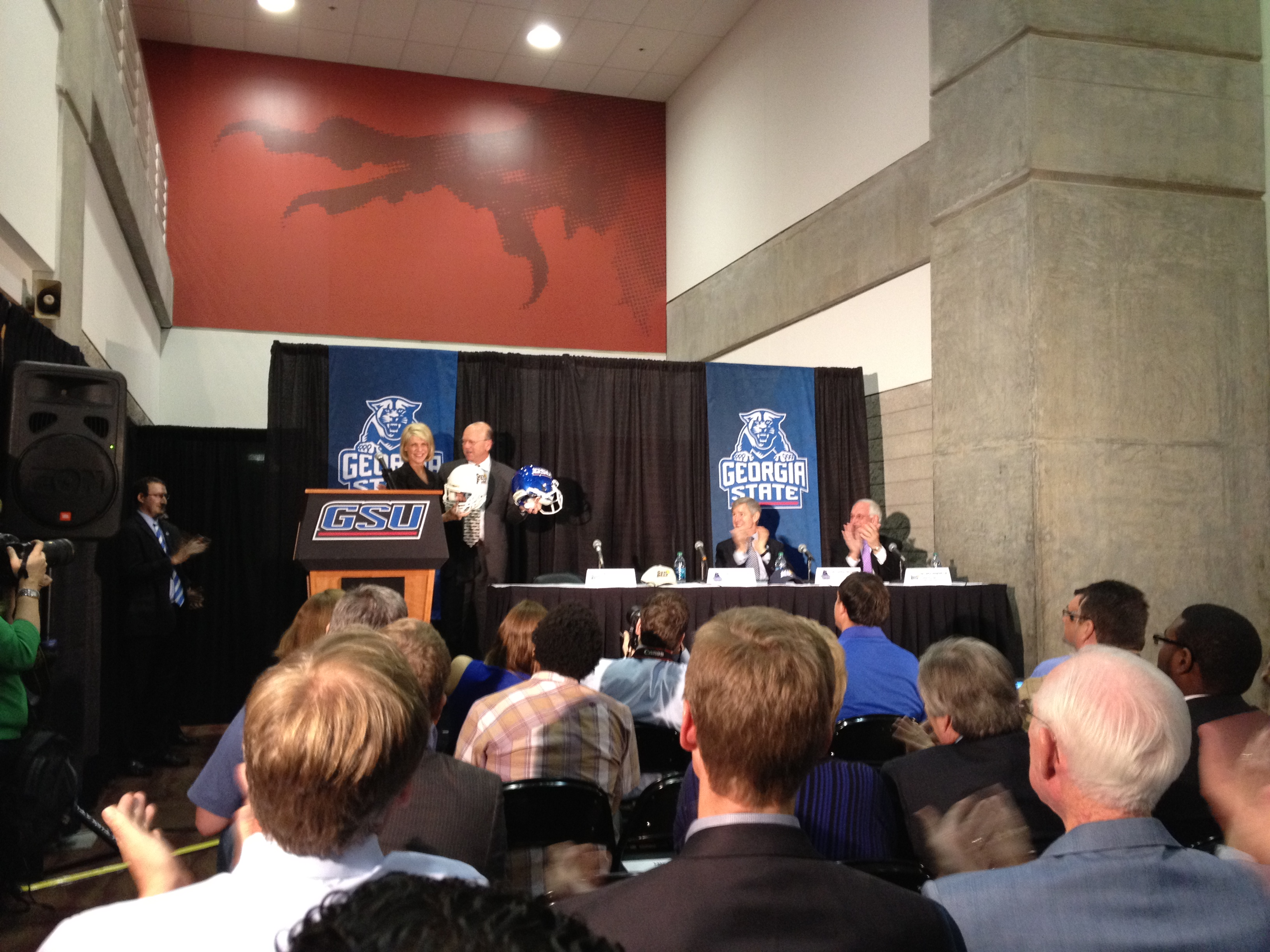
Athletic director Cheryl Levick trades helmets with Sun Belt commissioner Karl Benson at the Georgia Dome on April 9, 2012

Georgia State's second recruiting class was signed on February 3, 2010. The team would go on to hold spring practice beginning on March 23, and would begin working out at the new practice facility by March 27.

On September 2, Georgia State played its first football game and home opener against the Shorter Hawks, winning the game 41–7. The first touchdown was recorded by Parris Lee. A crowd of 30,237 was present at the Georgia Dome including then Georgia governor Sonny Perdue, former mayor Andrew Young, amongst other dignitaries. Later during the last game of the season on November 18, Georgia State would play FBS defending national champion and number 10 ranked Alabama in Tuscaloosa, Alabama, losing 63–7. The single touchdown was earned during a kick return by Albert Wilson. Georgia State would finish its inaugural year with a 6–5 record.

During its second year of play, the Panthers would record a 3–8 record. The season would be marked by a constant shuffle of quarterbacks after the 2009 starter Drew Little was suspended for the first four games and the second-string quarterback Kelton Hill was arrested prior to the season opener, leaving the punter, Bo Schlecter as starting quarterback.

The 2012 season marked the last with Bill Curry as head coach as he had stated that he would retire after the end of the season. Throughout the season, the Panthers were plagued with inconsistencies on both the offense and defense, made worse by injuries on either side and inexperienced quarterbacks. Curry would end his final season (and only year in the CAA) with a 1–10 record. The Panthers were not eligible for a post season berth (through neither the conference's automatic bid nor an at large bid) due to their reclassifying status as the team prepared to move up to FBS football in the Sun Belt Conference. This reclassifying status did allow for the Panthers to use more scholarships than the allowed 63 scholarships at the FCS level. On opening day Matt Hubbard surpassed the NCAA record for highest punting average in a single game, but it would end up not counting in the record books due to the reclassification.

Georgia State officially announced that it would join the Sun Belt Conference on April 9, 2012, during a press conference at the Georgia Dome. The school began full membership on July 1, 2013. Georgia State was a founding member of the Sun Belt Conference in 1976. The Sun Belt participates in Division I FBS, as opposed to FCS. The Panthers were not eligible for postseason play until the 2014 season.

=== Trent Miles era (2013–2016) ===
After Coach Bill Curry announced his retirement in August, the administration hired Parker Executive Search to help find potential candidates. On November 30, the Atlanta Journal-Constitution reported that the university had hired Trent Miles, head coach of Indiana State University. With Trent Miles' arrival as new head coach came the Panthers first complete change in uniform since the programs inception. The original uniform consisted solely of 2 different outfits; a blue home jersey with Panthers written across the chest above the player number and two white stripes on each arm; and a white away jersey with similar stylings, but with Georgia State written across the chest. Only a single helmet existed, blue and with the secondary GSU emblem on it. Both uniforms used the same white pants with panther heads on them. Initially, an anthracite colored helmet with "Panthers" written in stylized script across the sides was unveiled in April 2013, drawing criticism from fans due to its use of a non-school color and lack of GSU emblem. However, after a two-day-long social media event that had fans unravelling parts of a "puzzle", Miles' altered uniforms were unveiled, showing up to 12 possible variations. Two different jerseys were shown, a blue home jersey with white numbers and lettering and a white away jersey with blue numbers and lettering. Both uniforms included numbering on the sleeves and player names on the back. The uniforms also included three sets of pants, one pair copying the original whites, a blue pair, and an anthracite pair. Along with these changes, it was announced that the original blue helmet with the GSU insignia on it would still be available as a part of the uniform and would be worn at homecoming. Before each game, the seniors and captains decided which combination will be worn that week. The uniforms drew praise from Atlanta area fashion professionals, who cited it as "a modern take on a classic style."

During his tenure as head coach, Miles would oversee the transition of football from the FCS to the FBS, the highest level of football in the NCAA as members of the Sun Belt conference. With this move came a significant increase in opposition quality, as well as an increase in the number of scholarships available for the team. During the transition year from FCS to FBS, and the first year in which Miles coached, the Panthers would achieve zero wins, accruing a final record of 0–12, 0–7 in conference. While the following year would mark only a single win against the lone FCS opponent, the 2015 season would end with a 6–7 record, 5–3 in the Sun Belt and a loss at the Panthers' first bowl game, the Cure Bowl. The 2016 season would see only three wins, and after the tenth game, Miles was relieved from duty as head coach, leaving Tim Lappano as interim head coach for the final two games.

=== Shawn Elliott era (2017–2024) ===
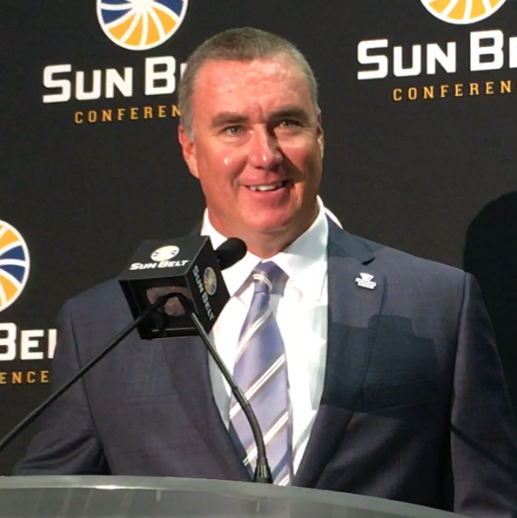
Former Georgia State head coach Shawn Elliott

On December 8, 2016, South Carolina offensive line coach Shawn Elliott accepted the head coaching position at Georgia State, causing the Panthers to start the 2017 season with a new head coach and in the newly acquired Georgia State Stadium. Elliott had coached under Steve Spurrier and Will Muschamp in Columbia and had served as the Gamecocks interim head coach between Spurrier's resignation and Muschamp's hiring. Elliott signed a five-year contract with Georgia State that paid him a base salary of $515,000 annually.

The Panthers finished 7–5 in 2017. They began the season on a sour note; dropping a 17–10 game to FCS opponent Tennessee State and a 56–0 shutout to No. 5 Penn State. Elliott's team won its first game of the season in their third contest, defeating Charlotte by a shutout score of 28–0. Georgia State was scheduled to play Memphis on September 30, but due to the Tigers having to reschedule American Athletic Conference opponent UCF for September 30 due to Hurricane Irma, the game between the Tigers and Panthers was canceled. On October 7, Georgia State defeated Coastal Carolina by a margin of 27–21. They earned their third straight win on October 14 with a 47–37 victory over Louisiana-Monroe, a game in which the offense set a school record with 670 total yards. After a 34–10 loss to Troy, the Panthers won their next three; defeating South Alabama by a margin of 21–13, Georgia Southern by a score of 21–17 and Texas State by a margin of 33–30. Georgia State closed the regular season with a 31–10 loss to Appalachian State and a 24–10 loss to Idaho. The Panthers accepted a berth in the 2017 Cure Bowl, a game they won over Western Kentucky by a score of 27–17. Coach Elliott resigned as head football coach from Georgia State in February 2024.

=== Dell McGee era (2024–present) ===
On February 23, 2024, Georgia State announced former Georgia running backs coach Dell McGee as its fourth head coach for the football program.

On September 14, 2024, Georgia State defeated the Vanderbilt Commodores out of the Southeastern Conference (SEC) 36-32 at Center Parc Stadium. It was Georgia State's first time hosting an SEC opponent, and their first victory against an SEC team since beating the Tennessee Volunteers on the road in 2019. Incidentally, Vanderbilt would go on to beat the then top ranked Alabama Crimson Tide three weeks later.

== Conference affiliations ==
Georgia State joined the Sun Belt Conference in 2013.

- Independent (2010–2011)
- Colonial Athletic Association (2012)
- Sun Belt Conference (2013–present)

== Head coaches ==
=== Bill Curry ===
Georgia State's first head coach Bill Curry was the initial architect for the program. His tenure ended with a record of 10–23. Initially hired by the former athletics director Mary McElroy, after her termination by previous Georgia State president Carl Patton, Curry was named interim athletic director while the school searched for a new AD. During his tenure as head coach, Curry saw the program grow from an idea into a fully fledged division I – FCS team. He also was present for the beginning of the transition from the football championship subdivision (FCS) to the football bowl subdivision (FBS) as the school changed athletics conferences from the Colonial Athletic Association to the Sun Belt Conference. While Georgia State built the foundations for its football program with him at its helm, including new practice facilities and offices, Curry's teams experienced little success on the field. After a 6–5 record in its first season, the Panthers followed with a 3–8 record in its second season, and finally closing with a 1–10 record in his final year. However, the university honored its founding head coach by naming the locker rooms at the new football practice facility after Curry.

=== Trent Miles ===
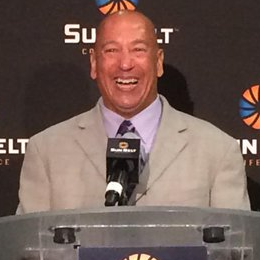
Former Georgia State head coach Trent Miles

On November 30, 2012, former Indiana State head coach Trent Miles was announced as the new Georgia State head coach. Miles had previously coached his alma mater Indiana State, taking a team that had won one game in its previous three years to being ranked No. 18 at the end of his final season as head coach there. Miles took over a similar situation at Georgia State, which had won only four of its own games in the previous two seasons and was moving to the FBS after only three seasons of existing as a program. During his first season at GSU, the Panthers won no games, and only one in his second season. However, during his third season as head coach, after accruing a record of 2–6, the Panthers would win their final four games, including a 34–7 defeat of in-state rivals Georgia Southern to a record of 6–6 and their first bowl game. The Panthers would fall at the Cure Bowl to San Jose State, 16–27. With a final record of 6–7, Miles would mirror almost exactly the turn-around that he had achieved at Indiana State, with both teams winning no games in their first season, one game in their second, and six games in their third. On November 12, 2016, after losing to conference foe ULM, it was reported that Trent Miles was fired, leaving with a career record of 9–38 at Georgia State.

=== Shawn Elliott ===
On December 9, 2016, Georgia State announced that it had hired former South Carolina co-offensive coordinator (2012–15), interim head coach (2015), and offensive line coach Shawn Elliott to lead the Panthers as head coach. His first recruiting class, shortened due to his late arrival at Georgia State, would be the highest ranked in school history according to rankings by ESPN and 247Sports.

On Feb 15, 2024, Shawn Elliott resigned his position as head coach of Georgia State to become an assistant coach at South Carolina due to family reasons. The decision was announced after the Panthers had already started Spring Practice. The same day Mike Sirignano, the program's strength coach, was named as the program's interim head coach. The decision was made to keep the team together for whenever a new head coach is hired.

=== Dell McGee ===
On February 23, 2024, Georgia State announced that former Georgia running backs coach Dell McGee would be the fourth head coach for the football program.

== Bowl games ==
The Panthers have played in six bowl games and have a 4–2 record.

Date	Coach	Bowl	Opponent	Result
December 19, 2015	Trent Miles	Cure Bowl	San Jose State	L 16–27
December 16, 2017	Shawn Elliott	Cure Bowl	Western Kentucky	W 27–17
December 31, 2019	Shawn Elliott	Arizona Bowl	Wyoming	L 17–38
December 26, 2020	Shawn Elliott	LendingTree Bowl	Western Kentucky	W 39–21
December 25, 2021	Shawn Elliott	Camellia Bowl	Ball State	W 51–20
December 23, 2023	Shawn Elliott	Famous Idaho Potato Bowl	Utah State	W 45–22

== Rivalries ==
=== Georgia Southern ===
Georgia Southern and Georgia State have only competed against each other in football since 2014. They played annually in basketball from the 1971–72 to 1980–81 seasons, 1995–96 and 1996–97, and 2009–10 to 2013–14 out-of-conference and as conference mates from the 1985–86 to 1991–92 seasons in the Trans America Athletic Conference (which is now the ASUN Conference), and since the 2014–15 season in the Sun Belt Conference. As of 2017, Georgia Southern has a 35–18 lead in the all-time series.

Since both schools can be abbreviated GSU, a point of conflict between the two schools is that both fan-bases claim that their university is, in fact, the real GSU. Georgia Southern officially uses GS in all of its branding, while Georgia State officially uses GSU. Georgia State claims the GSU title being that it became a university in 1969, more than 20 years before Georgia Southern (and therefore becoming GSU far in advance of Georgia Southern). Georgia Southern, on the other hand, has a more extensive history of football than Georgia State, restarting its program in 1981 and winning six national championships at the FCS level.

The football rivalry began after the hire of former Appalachian State (a major rival of Georgia Southern) athletic director Charlie Cobb to the same position at Ga State. During Georgia State's press release introducing Cobb, he revealed that Georgia Southern's athletic director Tom Kleinlein told him "welcome, now the war is on." The two teams met on the gridiron during the 2014 football season at the Georgia Dome. During the run up to the game, fans from both teams expressed their dislike for the other over social media outlets such as Twitter, at times trending with tags of "SouthernNotState" which were used as slogans for shirts. Georgia Southern beat Georgia State by a final score of 69–31, while drawing the second largest crowd of 28,427 for any Georgia State game. In 2015, Georgia State beat Georgia Southern 34–7 to give the worst home defeat for Georgia Southern since restarting their program in 1982. Through the 2024 season, Georgia State leads the series 6-5.

While Georgia State already had a history with Georgia Southern before the emergence of football, the schools' entry into the Sun Belt Conference would start an intense football rivalry. After the first season of play between the two teams in 2014 with Georgia Southern beating Georgia State 69–31, it was agreed by both universities athletic departments to introduce a rivalry series, with points allocated for each sport played between the two schools. Georgia State would win the first and second years of the rivalry series, with the Panthers beating the Eagles on the gridiron in 2015 34–7, the win granting bowl eligibility, and again in 2016, 30–24. Georgia State has won 3 straight football games against Georgia Southern.

== Facilities ==
=== Center Parc Stadium ===
Georgia State began hosting its home games at Center Parc Stadium during the 2017 season. Originally built for the 1996 Atlanta Summer Olympic Games as Centennial Olympic Stadium, the stadium was converted to Turner Field, a baseball stadium for the Atlanta Braves. Following the Braves' move to a new stadium, Georgia State purchased the stadium and converted it for football use. The initial phase of conversion took place between March and August 2017, and saw the removal of several sections of the lower bowl stands from right field and a new east side grandstand built to enclose the new football field. On August 8, it was announced that the field would be named Parker H. Petit Field after a major donor with the donation of $10 million. Several more stages of construction will follow after the 2017 season, including removing more lower bowl seating from the remaining right field, and additional facilities added to the upper bowl, including bathroom renovations and concessions.

Center Parc Stadium boasts the eighth-largest video board in college football, with a 71-by-79-foot (22 m × 24 m) span and an area of 5,600 sq ft (520 m^{2}). The capacity of the stadium as of the 2017 season is 25,000, although this is due to change with future phases of renovation. The field uses synthetic FieldTurf rather than field grass.

Through the 2025 season, Georgia State has compiled a home record of 23-29 at Center Parc Stadium. (.442)

=== Georgia Dome ===
From the program's inception in 2010 until the 2016 season, the Georgia State Panthers played home games in the Georgia Dome, located just north of the Georgia State main campus in Downtown Atlanta. It was the largest cable-supported domed stadium in the world and had a football capacity of 71,228. The regular capacity for GSU football games was 28,155 (the capacity of the lower bowl); however, the middle and upper bowls could be filled as overflow when necessary and has occurred twice since the program's inception. The Georgia Dome was closed on March 5, 2017, and demolished on November 20, 2017; the Dome's replacement, Mercedes-Benz Stadium, officially opened on August 26, 2017.

With the Georgia Dome as their home stadium, the Georgia State Panthers compiled a home record of 14 wins and 30 losses (.318).

== All-Americans ==
- Damaine Wilson, LB- 2024 (CFN Freshman Honorable Mention)

== Notable players ==
The following are Panthers who played in the National Football League or are currently playing in a professional football league:

- Ted Hurst - Tampa Bay Buccaneers
- Benjamin Chukwuma - Tampa Bay Buccaneers
- Nick Arbuckle – Toronto Argonauts (CFL)
- Robert Davis – Retired
- Penny Hart – Free Agent
- Ulrick John – Retired
- Christo Bilukidi – Retired
- Wil Lutz – Denver Broncos
- Chandon Sullivan – Free Agent
- Julien Laurent – Retired
- Travis Centel Glover Jr. - Green Bay Packers
- Albert Wilson – Retired
- Brandon Wright – Free Agent
- Dartez Jacobs – President of the United Football League Players Association
- Shamarious Gilmore – Free Agent
- Roger Carter – Free Agent
- Quavian White – Hamilton Tiger-Cats
- Jamari Thrash - Cleveland Browns
- Kelton Hill – Retired
- Mackendy Cheridor – Retired
- Nate Paxton – Retired

== Future non-conference opponents ==
Announced schedules as of July 14, 2026.

2026	2027	2028	2029	2030
North Carolina A&T	at Clemson	at Alabama	at Wake Forest	West Georgia
at Kennesaw State	Gardner–Webb	at UAB	UAB	Wake Forest
at UCF	at East Carolina	Kennesaw State		at UAB
Northern Illinois	UAB			
