= 2017 New Mexico State Aggies football team =

American college football season

2017 New Mexico State Aggies football

Arizona Bowl champion

Arizona Bowl, W 26–20 ^{OT} vs. Utah State
- Conference: Sun Belt Conference
- Record: 7–6 (4–4 Sun Belt)
- Head coach: Doug Martin (5th season)
- Associate head coach: Oliver Soukup (1st season)
- Offensive scheme: Air raid
- Defensive coordinator: Frank Spaziani (2nd season)
- Base defense: 3–3–5
- Home stadium: Aggie Memorial Stadium

2017 Sun Belt Conference football standings
	Conf.			Overall
Team	W		L	W		L
Troy +	7	–	1	11	–	2
Appalachian State +	7	–	1	9	–	4
Arkansas State	6	–	2	7	–	5
Georgia State	5	–	3	7	–	5
New Mexico State	4	–	4	7	–	6
Louisiana	4	–	4	5	–	7
Louisiana–Monroe	4	–	4	4	–	8
Idaho	3	–	5	4	–	8
South Alabama	3	–	5	4	–	8
Coastal Carolina *	2	–	6	3	–	9
Georgia Southern	2	–	6	2	–	10
Texas State	1	–	7	2	–	10
+ – Conference co-champions; * – Ineligible for postseason play due to FCS-to-FBS transition rules

The 2017 New Mexico State Aggies football team represented New Mexico State University as a member of the Sun Belt Conference during the 2017 NCAA Division I FBS football season. Led by fifth-year head coach Doug Martin, the Aggies compiled an overall record of 7–6 with a mark of 4–4 in conference play, placing in a three-way tie for fifth in the Sun Belt; this was the program's first winning season since 2002. New Mexico State played home games at Aggie Memorial Stadium in Las Cruces, New Mexico.

New Mexico State was invited to the Arizona Bowl, where the Aggies defeated Utah State in 26–20 overtime. This was the first bowl game appearance for the program since 1960. This would be the last season the Aggies finished with a winning record or appear in a bowl game until 2022.

This was the final season the Aggies competed as members of the Sun Belt. In March 2016, the presidents of the conference's member institutions voted to drop football-only members New Mexico State and Idaho following the 2017 season. The vote came after the NCAA announced a rule change that allows conferences to host football championship games with only 10 members. Starting with the 2018 season, the Aggies would compete as FBS independents until joining Conference USA in 2023.

== Schedule ==
New Mexico State announced its 2017 football schedule on March 1, 2017. The 2017 schedule consisted of five home and seven away games in the regular season. The Aggies hosted Sun Belt foes Arkansas State, Idaho, South Alabama, and Troy, and traveled to Appalachian State, Georgia Southern, Louisiana–Lafayette, and Texas State.

The Aggies hosted one of the four non-conference opponents, UTEP from Conference USA, and traveled to Arizona State from the Pac-12 Conference, Arkansas from the Southeastern Conference and New Mexico from the Mountain West Conference.

Date	Time	Opponent	Site	TV	Result	Attendance
August 31	8:30 p.m.	at Arizona State*	Sun Devil Stadium; Tempe, AZ	P12N	L 31–37	46,596
September 9	6:00 p.m.	at New Mexico*	Dreamstyle Stadium; Albuquerque, NM (Rio Grande Rivalry)	Stadium	W 30–28	32,427
September 16	6:00 p.m.	Troy	Aggie Memorial Stadium; Las Cruces, NM	ESPN3	L 24–27	15,446
September 23	6:00 p.m.	UTEP*	Aggie Memorial Stadium; Las Cruces, NM (Battle of I-10)	ESPN3	W 41–14	17,546
September 30	10:00 a.m.	at Arkansas*	Donald W. Reynolds Razorback Stadium; Fayetteville, AR	SECN	L 24–42	70,727
October 7	1:30 p.m.	at Appalachian State	Kidd Brewer Stadium; Boone, NC	ESPN3	L 31–45	22,787
October 14	4:00 p.m.	at Georgia Southern	Paulson Stadium; Statesboro, GA	ESPN3	W 35–27	16,278
October 28	6:00 p.m.	Arkansas State^{†}	Aggie Memorial Stadium; Las Cruces, NM	ALT	L 21–37	10,041
November 4	1:00 p.m.	at Texas State	Bobcat Stadium; San Marcos, TX	ESPN3	W 45–35	12,012
November 18	3:00 p.m.	at Louisiana	Cajun Field; Lafayette, LA	ESPN3	L 34–47	16,048
November 25	2:00 p.m.	Idaho	Aggie Memorial Stadium; Las Cruces, NM	ESPN3	W 17–10	21,894
December 2	2:30 p.m.	South Alabama	Aggie Memorial Stadium; Las Cruces, NM	ESPN3	W 22–17	26,268
December 29	3:30 p.m.	vs. Utah State*	Arizona Stadium; Tucson, AZ (Arizona Bowl)	CBSSN	W 26–20 ^{OT}	39,132
*Non-conference game; ^{†}Homecoming; All times are in Mountain time

== Personnel ==
2017 New Mexico State Aggies football team roster
Players
Coaches
Offense

Pos.	#	Name	Class
RB	1	Jason Huntley	So
WR	2	O. J. Clark	So
RB	3	Larry Rose III	Sr
WR	4	Cassius Corley	Jr
QB	5	Cameron Matthews	Fr
WR	6	Josh Aganon	Sr
WR	7	Gregory Hogan	Sr
QB	8	Josh Adkins	Fr
WR	9	Drew Dan	So
WR	10	Izaiah Lottie	So
WR	11	Conner Cramer	Sr
QB	12	Nick Jeanty	Jr
WR	13	Johnathan Boone	Jr
WR	14	Isaiah McIntyre	So
QB	15	Jeremy Hodge	Fr
WR	16	Jaleel Scott	Jr
QB	17	Tyler Rogers	Sr
WR	17	Cache Tarver	Fr
QB	19	Dominic Johnson	So
WR	21	Anthony Muse	So
RB	22	Eli Anderson	Fr
RB	25	Christian Gibson	Jr
WR	26	Royce Caldwell	Jr
OL	51	Kris'Sean Edwards	So
OL	52	Jalen Guerrero	Fr
OL	55	Sebastian Anderson	So
OL	58	Dezmand Candelarie	Sr
OL	61	Jefferson Hagen	So
OL	65	Tony Bello	So
OL	69	Billy Sharmoug	Jr
OL	72	Brayton Medina	Sr
OL	74	Jamin Smith	Jr
OL	75	David Ash	Fr
OL	76	Sage Doxtater	So
OL	77	Isaac McClain	Jr
OL	78	Brian Trujillo	So
WR	80	Sol Rascon	Fr
WR	81	Antonio Gomez	Fr
TE	82	Brock Marlatt	Fr
WR	83	Terray Nelson	Sr
TE	85	Miguel Provencio	Fr
WR	86	Troy Posey	Sr
TE	87	Bryce Roberts	Fr
TE	88	Xander Yarberough	Fr
TE	89	Jackson Solbeck	Jr
WR	96	Tevis Abraham Jr.	Fr

Defense

Pos.	#	Name	Class
DB	1	Jacob Nwangwa	Sr
LB	2	Terrill Hanks	Jr
DL	3	Derek Ibekwe	Jr
DB	4	DeMarcus Owens	Jr
DB	5	Komotay Koffie	So
LB	7	Javahn Fergurson	Jr
DL	8	Jassavia Reese	Jr
DL	9	Stody Bradley	Sr
DL	10	Cedric Wilcots II	So
DB	11	Malik Demby	Jr
DB	12	Tymon Locklin	Jr
DB	13	Austin Shaw	So
DB	14	Nakota Shepard-Creer	So
DL	15	Brett Kowalski	So
LB	17	Travis Parnell	So
DL	18	Derek Watson	So
DB	19	Austin Perkins	So
LB	20	Jonathan Hood	Jr
DB	21	Jaden Wright	Sr
DB	22	Shamad Lomax	So
DB	23	Ron LaForce	Jr
DB	24	Sy Slater	So
DB	26	Aron Mulugheta	Fr
LB	28	Gabriel Flynn	So
LB	28	Shane Jackson	So
DB	29	Jared Phipps	So
DB	30	Brandon Bell	So
LB	31	Dalton Herrington	Sr
DL	35	Matthew Young	Fr
DB	36	Dallas Hart	Sr
LB	41	Leon McQuaker	Jr
LB	42	Jacob Wilson	Fr
LB	43	Billy Nipp	Jr
LB	44	Will Clement	Jr
DL	48	Marcus Buckley	Fr
LB	49	Lui Fa'amasino	Jr
DL	51	Ray Lopez	So
LB	56	Jaylon Williams-Reese	Jr
LB	80	Trevor Brohard	Fr
DL	92	Humberto Renteria	Jr
DL	93	Jacob Arellano	So
DL	94	DeShawnte Lloyd	Sr
DL	98	Nathan Ballard	Fr
DL	99	Myles Vigne	Fr

Special teams

Pos.	#	Name	Class
P	16	Payton Theislar	So
K	18	Dylan Brown	So
K	24	Parker Davidson	Jr
K	37	Isaac Garcia	Fr
LS	40	Tim O'Donnell	Jr
K	45	Deven McGee	Fr
LS	84	Brandon Gonzalez	Fr

Head coach

- Doug Martin
  Head coach/Offensive coordinator

Coordinators/assistant coaches

- Oliver Soukop
  Associate head coach/Linebackers/Special teams
- Frank Spaziani
  Defensive coordinator
- Cory Martin
  Outside receivers/Recruiting coordinator
- Andy Richman
  Offensive line/Run game coordinator
- John Mumford
  Defensive line
- Matt Christian
  Running backs/Academic coordinator
- Brian Bell
  Secondary
- Chase Holbrook
  Quarterbacks
- Kai Brown
  Defensive ends

Legend

- (C) Team captain
- (S) Suspended
- (I) Ineligible
- Injured
- Redshirt

Roster
Last update: September 25, 2024

== Game summaries ==
=== At Arizona State ===
New Mexico State Aggies at Arizona State Sun Devils – Game summary

Quarter	1	2	3	4	Total
Aggies	0	13	0	18	31
Sun Devils	14	0	16	7	37

at Sun Devil Stadium, Tempe, Arizona

- Date: August 31
- Game time: 8:30 p.m. MDT/7:30 p.m. MST
- Game weather: Mostly clear skies, 101 °F (38 °C)
- Game attendance: 46,596
- Referee: Michael Mothershed
- TV announcers (P12N): Roxy Bernstein, Anthony Herron, and Lewis Johnson
- Box score, Recap

Game information
First quarter
- ASU – Kalen Ballage 7-yard run (Brandon Ruiz kick), 10:37. Sun Devils 7–0. Drive: 9 plays, 61 yards, 3:02.
- ASU – Jalen Harvey 53-yard pass from Manny Wilkins (Brandon Ruiz kick), 8:26. Sun Devils 14–0. Drive: 2 plays, 71 yards, 0:24.

Second quarter

- NMSU – Jaleel Scott 15-yard pass from Tyler Rogers (kick blocked), 10:52. Sun Devils 14–6. Drive: 13 plays, 89 yards, 4:00.
- NMSU – Tyler Rogers 1-yard run (Dylan Brown kick), 0:32. Sun Devils 14–13. Drive: 11 plays, 89 yards, 2:36.

Third quarter

- ASU – Brandon Ruiz 52-yard field goal, 8:50. Sun Devils 17–13. Drive: 13 plays, 41 yards, 6:10.
- ASU – John Humphrey 60-yard pass from Manny Wilkins (kick failed), 7:50. Sun Devils 23–13. Drive: 1 play, 60 yards, 0:09.
- ASU – Kalen Ballage 20-yard run (Brandon Ruiz kick), 0:50. Sun Devils 30–13. Drive: 8 plays, 67 yards, 3:23.

Fourth quarter

- ASU – Kobe Williams 49-yard interception return (Brandon Ruiz kick), 13:52. Sun Devils 37–13.
- NMSU – Jason Huntley 50-yard run (pass failed), 8:27. Sun Devils 37–19. Drive: 3 plays, 59 yards, 1:06.
- NMSU – Jason Huntley 23-yard pass from Tyler Rogers (pass failed), 5:04. Sun Devils 37–25. Drive: 7 plays, 57 yards, 2:03.
- NMSU – Jaleel Scott 29-yard pass from Tyler Rogers, 0:00. Sun Devils 37–31. Drive: 6 plays, 85 yards, 0:48.

Statistics	NMSU	ASU
First downs	27	19
Total yards	549	400
Rushing yards	151	79
Passing yards	398	321
Turnovers	2	0
Time of possession	30:20	29:40

Team	Category	Player	Statistics
New Mexico State	Passing	Tyler Rogers	40/57, 398 yards, 3 TD, 2 INT
New Mexico State	Rushing	Jason Huntley	5 rushes, 84 yards, TD
New Mexico State	Receiving	Jaleel Scott	8 receptions, 149 yards, 2 TD
Arizona State	Passing	Manny Wilkins	22/27, 300 yards, 2 TD
Arizona State	Rushing	Kalen Ballage	18 rushes, 79 yards, 2 TD
Arizona State	Receiving	John Humphrey	7 receptions, 123 yards, TD

=== At New Mexico ===
New Mexico State Aggies at New Mexico Lobos – Game summary

Quarter	1	2	3	4	Total
Aggies	13	10	7	0	30
Lobos	2	3	0	23	28

at Dreamstyle Stadium, Albuquerque, New Mexico

- Date: September 9
- Game time: 6:00 p.m. MDT
- Game weather: Mostly cloudy, 88 °F (31 °C)
- Game attendance: 32,427
- Referee: Jason McArthur
- TV announcers (Stadium): Chris Hassel, Daniel Jeremiah, and Shae Peppler
- Box score, Recap

Game information
First quarter
- NMSU – O. J. Clark 30-yard pass from Tyler Rogers (run failed), 12:56. Aggies 6–0. Drive: 5 plays, 42 yards, 1:19.
- UNM – Jalin Burrell 98-yard PAT return, 12:56. Aggies 6–2.
- NMSU – Izaiah Lottie 81-yard pass from Tyler Rogers (Dylan Brown kick), 4:25. Aggies 13–2. Drive: 3 plays, 93 yards, 1:11.

Second quarter

- UNM – Jason Sanders 23-yard field goal, 11:02. Aggies 13–5. Drive: 11 plays, 56 yards, 4:27.
- NMSU – Dylan Brown 39-yard field goal, 6:14. Aggies 16–5. Drive: 7 plays, 21 yards, 1:54.
- NMSU – Izaiah Lottie 17-yard pass from Tyler Rogers (Dylan Brown kick), 2:22. Aggies 23–5. Drive: 7 plays, 80 yards, 2:09.

Third quarter

- NMSU – Jaleel Scott 8-yard pass from Tyler Rogers (Dylan Brown kick), 3:28. Aggies 30–5. Drive: 9 plays, 63 yards, 2:09.

Fourth quarter

- UNM – Chris Davis 5-yard pass from Tevaka Tuioti (pass failed), 12:42. Aggies 30–11. Drive: 6 plays, 54 yards, 1:56.
- UNM – Jay Griffin IV 61-yard run (Tevaka Tuioti pass to Richard McQuarley), 10:09. Aggies 30–19. Drive: 1 play, 61 yards, 0:13.
- UNM – Jason Sanders 22-yard field goal, 6:11. Aggies 30–22. Drive: 6 plays, 31 yards, 1:01.
- UNM – Jay Griffin IV 19-yard pass from Tevaka Tuioti (pass failed), 1:11. Aggies 30–28. Drive: 8 plays, 80 yards, 1:27.

Statistics	NMSU	UNM
First downs	23	21
Total yards	500	430
Rushing yards	99	176
Passing yards	401	254
Turnovers	2	4
Time of possession	30:22	29:38

Team	Category	Player	Statistics
New Mexico State	Passing	Tyler Rogers	34/57, 401 yards, 4 TD, INT
New Mexico State	Rushing	Larry Rose III	21 rushes, 99 yards
New Mexico State	Receiving	Izaiah Lottie	3 receptions, 102 yards, 2 TD
New Mexico	Passing	Tevaka Tuioti	10/19, 151 yards, 2 TD
New Mexico	Rushing	Jay Griffin IV	1 rush, 61 yards, TD
New Mexico	Receiving	Jay Griffin IV	5 receptions, 95 yards, TD

=== Troy ===
Troy Trojans at New Mexico State Aggies – Game summary

Quarter	1	2	3	4	Total
Trojans	13	0	14	0	27
Aggies	3	0	13	8	24

at Aggie Memorial Stadium, Las Cruces, New Mexico

- Date: September 16
- Game time: 6:00 p.m. MDT
- Game weather: Partly cloudy, 89 °F (32 °C)
- Game attendance: 15,446
- Referee: Kevin Stine
- TV announcers (ESPN3): Adam Young and Danny Knee
- Box score, Recap

Game information
First quarter
- TROY – Damion Willis 9-yard pass from Brandon Silvers (Bratcher Underwood kick), 11:38. Trojans 7–0. Drive: 5 plays, 50 yards, 1:31.
- NMSU – Dylan Brown 26-yard field goal, 6:48. Trojans 7–3. Drive: 11 plays, 66 yards, 4:50.
- TROY – Jordan Chunn 3-yard run (kick failed), 3:27. Trojans 13–3. Drive: 8 plays, 73 yards, 3:14.

Second quarter

- No scoring plays

Third quarter

- TROY – Jamarius Henderson 3-yard run (Bratcher Underwood kick), 12:27. Trojans 20–3. Drive: 6 plays, 65 yards, 2:25.
- NMSU – Izaiah Lottie 46-yard pass from Tyler Rogers (kick failed), 9:53. Trojans 20–9. Drive: 8 plays, 83 yards, 2:28.
- NMSU – Jaleel Scott 5-yard pass from Tyler Rogers (Dylan Brown kick), 3:44. Trojans 20–16. Drive: 12 plays, 79 yards, 4:10.
- TROY – Brandon Silvers 32-yard run (Bratcher Underwood kick), 0:17. Trojans 27–16. Drive: 9 plays, 75 yards, 3:27.

Fourth quarter

- NMSU – Izaiah Lottie 9-yard pass from Tyler Rogers (Tyler Rogers pass to Jaleel Scott), 9:49. Trojans 27–24. Drive: 8 plays, 89 yards, 3:08.

Statistics	TROY	NMSU
First downs	26	18
Total yards	476	382
Rushing yards	190	51
Passing yards	286	331
Turnovers	0	0
Time of possession	34:09	25:51

Team	Category	Player	Statistics
Troy	Passing	Brandon Silvers	25/40, 286 yards, TD
Troy	Rushing	Jordan Chunn	20 rushes, 87 yards, TD
Troy	Receiving	Deondre Douglas	7 receptions, 101 yards
New Mexico State	Passing	Tyler Rogers	32/45, 331 yards, 3 TD
New Mexico State	Rushing	Larry Rose III	12 rushes, 69 yards
New Mexico State	Receiving	Izaiah Lottie	4 receptions, 93 yards, 2 TD

=== UTEP ===
UTEP Miners at New Mexico State Aggies – Game summary

Quarter	1	2	3	4	Total
Miners	7	0	0	7	14
Aggies	7	14	13	7	41

at Aggie Memorial Stadium, Las Cruces, New Mexico

- Date: September 23
- Game time: 6:00 p.m. MDT
- Game weather: Mostly cloudy, 86 °F (30 °C)
- Game attendance: 17,546
- Referee: Hubert Owens
- TV announcers (ESPN3): Greg Mescall and Jay Taylor
- Box score, Recap

Game information
First quarter
- NMSU – Larry Rose III 40-yard run (Dylan Brown kick), 9:45. Aggies 7–0. Drive: 1 play, 40 yards, 0:10.
- UTEP – Ryan Metz 5-yard run (Brady Viles kick), 2:48. Tied 7–7. Drive: 12 plays, 81 yards, 6:52.

Second quarter

- NMSU – Larry Rose III 28-yard run (Dylan Brown kick), 9:02. Aggies 14–7. Drive: 15 plays, 97 yards, 5:23.
- NMSU – Shamad Lomax 19-yard interception return (Dylan Brown kick), 1:37. Aggies 21–7.

Third quarter

- NMSU – Larry Rose III 2-yard pass from Tyler Rogers (Dylan Brown kick), 7:44. Aggies 28–7. Drive: 7 plays, 60 yards, 2:44.
- NMSU – Conner Cramer 10-yard pass from Tyler Rogers (kick failed), 3:57. Aggies 34–7. Drive: 6 plays, 64 yards, 2:28.

Fourth quarter

- NMSU – Tyler Rogers 4-yard run (Dylan Brown kick), 11:35. Aggies 41–7. Drive: 9 plays, 85 yards, 3:25.
- UTEP – Trace Mascorro 26-yard fumble return (Brady Viles kick), 1:51. Aggies 41–14.

Statistics	UTEP	NMSU
First downs	15	21
Total yards	227	462
Rushing yards	135	179
Passing yards	92	283
Turnovers	5	2
Time of possession	30:25	29:35

Team	Category	Player	Statistics
UTEP	Passing	Ryan Metz	6/18, 54 yards, 3 INT
UTEP	Rushing	Quardraiz Wadley	19 rushes, 77 yards
UTEP	Receiving	David Lucero	2 receptions, 29 yards
New Mexico State	Passing	Tyler Rogers	26/43, 283 yards, 2 TD, INT
New Mexico State	Rushing	Larry Rose III	17 rushes, 144 yards, 2 TD
New Mexico State	Receiving	Jaleel Scott	4 receptions, 74 yards

=== At Arkansas ===
New Mexico State Aggies at Arkansas Razorbacks – Game summary

Quarter	1	2	3	4	Total
Aggies	0	10	7	7	24
Razorbacks	14	14	7	7	42

at Donald W. Reynolds Razorback Stadium, Fayetteville, Arkansas

- Date: September 30
- Game time: 10:00 a.m. MDT/11:00 a.m. CDT
- Game weather: Scattered clouds, 70 °F (21 °C)
- Game attendance: 70,727
- Referee: David Smith
- TV announcers (SECN): Taylor Zarzour, Andre Ware, and Olivia Harlan
- Box score, Recap

Game information
First quarter
- ARK – Deon Stewart 38-yard pass from Austin Allen (Connor Limpert kick), 11:01. Razorbacks 7–0. Drive: 9 plays, 80 yards, 3:59.
- ARK – Devwah Whaley 3-yard run (Connor Limpert kick), 0:00. Razorbacks 14–0. Drive: 8 plays, 80 yards, 3:34.

Second quarter

- ARK – Jonathan Nance 31-yard pass from Austin Allen (Connor Limpert kick), 8:38. Razorbacks 21–0. Drive: 8 plays, 61 yards, 4:59.
- NMSU – Tyler Rogers 1-yard run (Dylan Brown kick), 5:51. Razorbacks 21–7. Drive: 7 plays, 65 yards, 2:47.
- ARK – Chase Hayden 2-yard run (Connor Limpert kick), 1:34. Razorbacks 28–7. Drive: 8 plays, 68 yards, 4:17.
- NMSU – Dylan Brown 27-yard field goal, 0:00. Razorbacks 28–10. Drive: 7 plays, 68 yards, 1:34.

Third quarter

- NMSU – O. J. Clark 9-yard pass from Tyler Rogers (Dylan Brown kick), 11:21. Razorbacks 28–17. Drive: 11 plays, 80 yards, 3:39.
- ARK – Jonathan Nance 3-yard pass from Austin Allen (Connor Limpert kick), 2:30. Razorbacks 35–17. Drive: 16 plays, 63 yards, 9:01.

Fourth quarter

- ARK – Chase Hayden 1-yard run (Connor Limpert kick), 14:54. Razorbacks 42–17. Drive: 6 plays, 22 yards, 2:26.
- NMSU – Jaleel Scott 36-yard pass from Tyler Rogers (Dylan Brown kick), 12:47. Razorbacks 42–24. Drive: 6 plays, 81 yards, 2:07.

Statistics	NMSU	ARK
First downs	18	29
Total yards	355	494
Rushing yards	11	230
Passing yards	344	264
Turnovers	2	1
Time of possession	18:25	41:35

Team	Category	Player	Statistics
New Mexico State	Passing	Tyler Rogers	23/38, 344 yards, 2 TD, INT
New Mexico State	Rushing	Larry Rose III	8 rushes, 25 yards
New Mexico State	Receiving	Jaleel Scott	9 receptions, 174 yards, TD
Arkansas	Passing	Austin Allen	19/26, 264 yards, 3 TD, INT
Arkansas	Rushing	Devwah Walley	19 rushes, 119 yards, TD
Arkansas	Receiving	Jordan Jones	4 receptions, 84 yards

=== At Appalachian State ===
New Mexico State Aggies at Appalachian State Mountaineers – Game summary

Quarter	1	2	3	4	Total
Aggies	7	7	3	14	31
Mountaineers	3	14	0	28	45

at Kidd Brewer Stadium, Boone, North Carolina

- Date: October 7
- Game time: 1:30 p.m. MDT/3:30 p.m. EDT
- Game weather: Overcast, 63 °F (17 °C)
- Game attendance: 22,787
- Referee: Marshall Lewis
- TV announcers (ESPN3): Matt Stewart and Stan Lewter
- Box score, Recap

Game information
First quarter
- NMSU – Bryce Roberts 4-yard pass from Tyler Rogers (Dylan Brown kick), 9:40. Aggies 7–0. Drive: 6 plays, 27 yards, 1:57.
- APP – Michael Rubino 26-yard field goal, 1:59. Aggies 7–3. Drive: 4 plays, 4 yards, 1:18.

Second quarter

- APP – Jalin Moore 3-yard run (Michael Rubino kick), 12:15. Mountaineers 10–7. Drive: 4 plays, 25 yards, 1:17.
- APP – Terrence Upshaw 13-yard run (Michael Rubino kick), 11:01. Mountaineers 17–7. Drive: 2 plays, 28 yards, 0:29.
- NMSU – Tyler Rogers 2-yard run (Dylan Brown kick), 0:46. Mountaineers 17–14. Drive: 11 plays, 76 yards, 3:10.

Third quarter

- NMSU – Dylan Brown 31-yard field goal, 7:37. Tied 17–17. Drive: 10 plays, 66 yards, 3:27.

Fourth quarter

- NMSU – Larry Rose III 1-yard run (Dylan Brown kick), 13:44. Aggies 24–17. Drive: 10 plays, 66 yards, 2:59.
- APP – Taylor Lamb 38-yard run (Michael Rubino kick), 10:31. Tied 24–24. Drive: 3 plays, 54 yards, 0:49.
- NMSU – Jason Huntley 61-yard pass from Tyler Rogers (Dylan Brown kick), 9:27. Aggies 31–24. Drive: 3 plays, 80 yards, 0:59.
- APP – Terrence Upshaw 10-yard run (Michael Rubino kick), 7:13. Tied 31–31. Drive: 8 plays, 0 yards, 2:09.
- APP – Thomas Hennigan 27-yard pass from Malik Williams (Michael Rubino kick), 5:45. Mountaineers 38–31. Drive: 2 plays, 29 yards, 0:41.
- APP – Jalin Moore 56-yard run (Michael Rubino kick), 2:12. Mountaineers 45–31. Drive: 5 plays, 79 yards, 2:14.

Statistics	NMSU	APP
First downs	28	17
Total yards	532	425
Rushing yards	176	350
Passing yards	356	75
Turnovers	6	3
Time of possession	33:10	26:50

Team	Category	Player	Statistics
New Mexico State	Passing	Tyler Rogers	27/50, 356 yards, 2 TD, 6 INT
New Mexico State	Rushing	Larry Rose III	21 rushes, 95 yards, TD
New Mexico State	Receiving	Jason Huntley	3 receptions, 111 yards, TD
Appalachian State	Passing	Taylor Lamb	10/21, 48 yards, 2 INT
Appalachian State	Rushing	Jalin Moore	19 rushes, 241 yards, 2 TD
Appalachian State	Receiving	Thomas Hennigan	6 receptions, 66 yards, TD

=== At Georgia Southern ===
New Mexico State Aggies at Georgia Southern Eagles – Game summary

Quarter	1	2	3	4	Total
Aggies	14	7	0	14	35
Eagles	14	10	3	0	27

at Paulson Stadium, Statesboro, Georgia

- Date: October 14
- Game time: 4:00 p.m. MDT/6:00 p.m. EDT
- Game weather: Sunny and humid, 80 °F (27 °C)
- Game attendance: 16,278
- Referee: Tedd Pitts
- TV announcers (ESPN3): Matt Stewart and Tyoka Jackson
- Box score, Recap

Game information
First quarter
- NMSU – Tyler Rogers 5-yard run (Dylan Brown kick), 12:37. Aggies 7–0. Drive: 8 plays, 75 yards, 2:23.
- GASO – L. A. Ramsby 1-yard run (Tyler Bass kick), 5:09. Tied 7–7. Drive: 15 plays, 67 yards, 7:19.
- NMSU – Gregory Hogan 59-yard pass from Tyler Rogers (Dylan Brown kick), 3:30. Aggies 14–7. Drive: 4 plays, 75 yards, 1:39.
- GASO – Wesley Fields 48-yard run (Tyler Bass kick), 0:01. Tied 14–14. Drive: 1 play, 48 yards, 0:10.

Second quarter

- GASO – Tyler Bass 32-yard field goal, 7:03. Eagles 17–14. Drive: 8 plays, 18 yards, 4:06.
- NMSU – Jaleel Scott 5-yard pass from Tyler Rogers (Dylan Brown kick), 4:49. Aggies 21–17. Drive: 11 plays, 75 yards, 2:14.
- GASO – Dexter Carter Jr. 70-yard kickoff return (Tyler Bass kick), 4:36. Eagles 24–21.

Third quarter

- GASO – Tyler Bass 41-yard field goal, 10:50. Eagles 27–21. Drive: 8 plays, 51 yards, 4:10.

Fourth quarter

- NMSU – Bryce Roberts 17-yard pass from Conner Cramer (Dylan Brown kick), 14:54. Aggies 28–27. Drive: 8 plays, 80 yards, 3:46.
- NMSU – Jaleel Scott 5-yard pass from Tyler Rogers (Dylan Brown kick), 2:05. Aggies 35–27. Drive: 14 plays, 80 yards, 5:53.

Statistics	NMSU	GASO
First downs	25	13
Total yards	491	265
Rushing yards	92	192
Passing yards	399	73
Turnovers	2	0
Time of possession	28:24	31:36

Team	Category	Player	Statistics
New Mexico State	Passing	Tyler Rogers	31/51, 382 yards, 3 TD, 2 INT
New Mexico State	Rushing	Jason Huntley	16 rushes, 85 yards
New Mexico State	Receiving	Anthony Muse	5 receptions, 54 yards
Georgia Southern	Passing	Shai Werts	6/9, 73 yards
Georgia Southern	Rushing	Wesley Fields	13 rushes, 103 yards, TD
Georgia Southern	Receiving	Myles Campbell	3 receptions, 41 yards

=== Arkansas State ===
Arkansas State Red Wolves at New Mexico State Aggies – Game summary

Quarter	1	2	3	4	Total
Red Wolves	7	0	10	20	37
Aggies	0	14	0	7	21

at Aggie Memorial Stadium, Las Cruces, New Mexico

- Date: October 28
- Game time: 6:00 p.m. MDT
- Game weather: Clear, 65 °F (18 °C)
- Game attendance: 10,041
- Referee: Jeremy Parker
- TV announcers (ALT): Adam Young and Danny Knee
- Box score, Recap

Game information
First quarter
- ARST – Omar Bayless 21-yard pass from Justice Hansen (Sawyer Williams kick), 1:25. Red Wolves 7–0. Drive: 4 plays, 50 yards, 1:07.

Second quarter

- NMSU – Larry Rose III 1-yard run (Dylan Brown kick), 8:46. Tied 7–7. Drive: 5 plays, 24 yards, 2:07.
- NMSU – Bryce Roberts 3-yard pass from Tyler Rogers (Dylan Brown kick), 0:24. Aggies 14–7. Drive: 7 plays, 84 yards, 0:47.

Third quarter

- ARST – Sawyer Williams 44-yard field goal, 9:12. Aggies 14–10. Drive: 6 plays, 17 yards, 1:08.
- ARST – Omar Bayless 23-yard pass from Justice Hansen (Sawyer Williams kick), 6:55. Red Wolves 17–14. Drive: 7 plays, 58 yards, 1:26.

Fourth quarter

- NMSU – Tyler Rogers 2-yard run (Dylan Brown kick), 14:56. Aggies 21–17. Drive: 5 plays, 78 yards, 1:40.
- ARST – Chris Murray 12-yard pass from Justice Hansen (Sawyer Williams kick), 12:15. Red Wolves 24–21. Drive: 8 plays, 65 yards, 2:41.
- ARST – Chris Murray 37-yard pass from Justice Hansen (kick failed), 9:16. Red Wolves 30–21. Drive: 5 plays, 71 yards, 1:49.
- ARST – Johnston White 8-yard run (Sawyer Williams kick), 8:02. Red Wolves 37–21. Drive: 2 plays, 9 yards, 0:52.

Statistics	ARST	NMSU
First downs	24	13
Total yards	417	256
Rushing yards	120	35
Passing yards	297	221
Turnovers	2	2
Time of possession	31:39	28:21

Team	Category	Player	Statistics
Arkansas State	Passing	Justice Hansen	25/40, 297 yards, 4 TD, INT
Arkansas State	Rushing	Justice Hansen	17 rushes, 39 yards
Arkansas State	Receiving	Omar Bayless	4 receptions, 73 yards, 2 TD
New Mexico State	Passing	Tyler Rogers	20/40, 221 yards, TD, 2 INT
New Mexico State	Rushing	Larry Rose III	18 rushes, 55 yards, TD
New Mexico State	Receiving	O. J. Clark	7 receptions, 113 yards

=== At Texas State ===
New Mexico State Aggies at Texas State Bobcats – Game summary

Quarter	1	2	3	4	Total
Aggies	7	10	14	14	45
Bobcats	14	7	7	7	35

at Bobcat Stadium, San Marcos, Texas

- Date: November 4
- Game time: 1:00 p.m. MDT/2:00 p.m. CDT
- Game weather: Cloudy, 79 °F (26 °C)
- Game attendance: 12,012
- Referee: Kevin Stine
- TV announcers (ESPN3): David Saltzman and Stanford Routt
- Box score, Recap

Game information
First quarter
- TXST – Gabe Schrade 10-yard pass from Hutch White (Foster Hilborn kick), 12:29. Bobcats 7–0. Drive: 9 plays, 75 yards, 2:31.
- NMSU – Tyler Rogers 2-yard run (Dylan Brown kick), 9:49. Tied 7–7. Drive: 8 plays, 75 yards, 2:38.
- TXST – Elijah King 11-yard pass from Damian Williams (Foster Hilborn kick), 6:28. Bobcats 14–7. Drive: 11 plays, 75 yards, 3:21.

Second quarter

- NMSU – Johnathon Boone 44-yard pass from Tyler Rogers (Dylan Brown kick), 8:57. Tied 14–14. Drive: 3 plays, 81 yards, 1:01.
- TXST – Tyler Watts 76-yard run (Foster Hilborn kick), 8:12. Bobcats 21–14. Drive: 2 plays, 87 yards, 0:39.
- NMSU – Dylan Brown 35-yard field goal, 2:58. Bobcats 21–17. Drive: 7 plays, 26 yards, 2:22.

Third quarter

- NMSU – Anthony Muse 29-yard pass from Tyler Rogers (Dylan Brown kick), 9:48. Aggies 24–21. Drive: 5 plays, 81 yards, 2:04.
- NMSU – Jaleel Scott 22-yard pass from Nick Jeanty (Dylan Brown kick), 3:10. Aggies 31–21. Drive: 5 plays, 49 yards, 1:43.
- TXST – Tyler Watts 13-yard pass from Damian Williams (Foster Hilborn kick), 0:00. Aggies 31–28. Drive: 10 plays, 82 yards, 3:05.

Fourth quarter

- NMSU – Larry Rose III 1-yard run (Dylan Brown kick), 9:44. Aggies 38–28. Drive: 4 plays, 75 yards, 2:06.
- TXST – Caleb Twyford 69-yard pass from Jaylin Nelson (Foster Hilborn kick), 9:02. Aggies 38–35. Drive: 2 plays, 75 yards, 0:42.
- NMSU – O. J. Clark 14-yard pass from Tyler Rogers (Dylan Brown kick), 2:22. Aggies 45–35. Drive: 8 plays, 84 yards, 3:33.

Statistics	NMSU	TXST
First downs	26	30
Total yards	622	563
Rushing yards	119	163
Passing yards	503	400
Turnovers	2	4
Time of possession	30:46	29:14

Team	Category	Player	Statistics
New Mexico State	Passing	Tyler Rogers	29/46, 474 yards, 3 TD
New Mexico State	Rushing	Larry Rose III	19 rushes, 81 yards, TD
New Mexico State	Receiving	Jaleel Scott	7 receptions, 130 yards, TD
Texas State	Passing	Damian Williams	31/47, 321 yards, 2 TD, INT
Texas State	Rushing	Tyler Watts	1 rush, 76 yards, TD
Texas State	Receiving	Elijah King	11 receptions, 129 yards, TD

=== At Louisiana ===
New Mexico State Aggies at Louisiana Ragin' Cajuns – Game summary

Quarter	1	2	3	4	Total
Aggies	7	10	14	3	34
Ragin' Cajuns	14	17	3	13	47

at Cajun Field, Lafayette, Louisiana

- Date: November 18
- Game time: 3:00 p.m. MST/4:00 p.m. CST
- Game weather: Partly cloudy, 80 °F (27 °C)
- Game attendance: 16,048
- Referee: Ted Pitts
- TV announcers (ESPN3): David Saltzman and Hudson Mason
- Box score, Recap

Game information
First quarter
- ULL – Dion Ray 3-yard run (Stevie Artigue kick), 10:46. Ragin' Cajuns 7–0. Drive: 10 plays, 75 yards, 4:14.
- NMSU – Jason Huntley 97-yard kickoff return (Dylan Brown kick), 10:30. Tied 7–7.
- ULL – Michael Jacquet 3-yard pass from Jordan Davis (Stevie Artigue kick), 2:38. Ragin' Cajuns 14–7. Drive: 13 plays, 75 yards, 7:52.

Second quarter

- ULL – Trey Ragas 31-yard run (Stevie Artigue kick), 9:20. Ragin' Cajuns 21–7. Drive: 3 plays, 49 yards, 1:13.
- NMSU – Dylan Brown 24-yard field goal, 5:07. Ragin' Cajuns 21–10. Drive: 12 plays, 58 yards, 4:13.
- ULL – Jordan Davis 43-yard run (Stevie Artigue kick), 3:33. Ragin' Cajuns 28–10. Drive: 4 plays, 63 yards, 1:34.
- NMSU – Larry Rose III 2-yard run (Dylan Brown kick), 1:36. Ragin' Cajuns 28–17. Drive: 7 plays, 75 yards, 1:57.
- ULL – Stevie Artigue 30-yard field goal, 0:23. Ragin' Cajuns 31–17. Drive: 9 plays, 62 yards, 1:13.

Third quarter

- NMSU – Larry Rose III 29-yard pass from Tyler Rogers (Dylan Brown kick), 13:15. Ragin' Cajuns 31–24. Drive: 5 plays, 75 yards, 1:45.
- ULL – Stevie Artigue 28-yard field goal, 7:05. Ragin' Cajuns 34–24. Drive: 14 plays, 64 yards, 6:10.
- NMSU – Larry Rose III 7-yard run (Dylan Brown kick), 3:25. Ragin' Cajuns 34–31. Drive: 9 plays, 82 yards, 3:40.

Fourth quarter

- NMSU – Dylan Brown 19-yard field goal, 14:19. Tied 34–34. Drive: 8 plays, 45 yards, 2:34.
- ULL – Ryheem Malone 33-yard pass from Jordan Davis (Stevie Artigue kick), 10:21. Ragin' Cajuns 41–34. Drive: 10 plays, 65 yards, 3:58.
- ULL – Trey Ragas 4-yard run (kick failed), 5:31. Ragin' Cajuns 47–34. Drive: 2 plays, 15 yards, 0:35.

Statistics	NMSU	ULL
First downs	26	29
Total yards	402	505
Rushing yards	89	279
Passing yards	313	226
Turnovers	3	0
Time of possession	22:58	37:02

Team	Category	Player	Statistics
New Mexico State	Passing	Tyler Rogers	17/24, 184 yards, TD
New Mexico State	Rushing	Jason Huntley	6 rushes, 58 yards
New Mexico State	Receiving	Larry Rose III	7 receptions, 101 yards, TD
Louisiana	Passing	Jordan Davis	20/34, 219 yards, 2 TD
Louisiana	Rushing	Trey Ragas	23 rushes, 132 yards, 2 TD
Louisiana	Receiving	Ryheem Malone	7 receptions, 113 yards, TD

=== Idaho ===
Idaho Vandals at New Mexico State Aggies – Game summary

Quarter	1	2	3	4	Total
Vandals	0	7	3	0	10
Aggies	14	0	0	3	17

at Aggie Memorial Stadium, Las Cruces, New Mexico

- Date: November 25
- Game time: 2:00 p.m. MST
- Game weather: Sunny and clear, 72 °F (22 °C)
- Game attendance: 21,894
- Referee: Jason Autrey
- TV announcers (ESPN3): Greg Mescall and Watson Brown
- Box score, Recap

Game information
First quarter
- NMSU – Larry Rose III 25-yard run (Dylan Brown kick), 10:19. Aggies 7–0. Drive: 6 plays, 57 yards, 1:36.
- NMSU – Larry Rose III 3-yard run (Dylan Brown kick), 8:24. Aggies 14–0. Drive: 5 plays, 23 yards, 1:12.

Second quarter

- IDHO – David Ungerer 25-yard pass from Colton Richardson (Cade Coffey kick), 1:46. Aggies 14–7. Drive: 3 plays, 44 yards, 0:41.

Third quarter

- IDHO – Cade Coffey 34-yard field goal, 7:00. Aggies 14–10. Drive: 6 plays, 22 yards, 1:45.

Fourth quarter

- NMSU – Dylan Brown 24-yard field goal, 12:29. Aggies 17–10. Drive: 11 plays, 61 yards, 2:41.

Statistics	IDHO	NMSU
First downs	16	23
Total yards	215	403
Rushing yards	41	172
Passing yards	174	231
Turnovers	3	2
Time of possession	31:55	28:05

Team	Category	Player	Statistics
Idaho	Passing	Colton Richardson	18/33, 167 yards, TD, INT
Idaho	Rushing	Aaron Duckworth	13 rushes, 39 yards
Idaho	Receiving	Alfonso Onuwor	6 receptions, 63 yards
New Mexico State	Passing	Nick Jeanty	31/49, 231 yards, INT
New Mexico State	Rushing	Larry Rose III	22 rushes, 100 yards, 2 TD
New Mexico State	Receiving	Jaleel Scott	8 receptions, 77 yards

=== South Alabama ===
South Alabama Jaguars at New Mexico State Aggies – Game summary

Quarter	1	2	3	4	Total
Jaguars	0	7	0	10	17
Aggies	0	13	0	9	22

at Aggie Memorial Stadium, Las Cruces, New Mexico

- Date: December 2
- Game time: 2:30 p.m. MST
- Game weather: Partly cloudy, 69 °F (21 °C)
- Game attendance: 26,268
- Referee: Marshall Lewis
- TV announcers (ESPN3): Adam Young and Danny Knee
- Box score, Recap

Game information
First quarter
- No scoring plays

Second quarter

- USA – Dallas Davis 11-yard run (Gavin Patterson kick), 14:50. Jaguars 7–0. Drive: 9 plays, 71 yards, 3:20.
- NMSU – Dylan Brown 30-yard field goal, 12:50. Jaguars 7–3. Drive: 8 plays, 45 yards, 1:52.
- NMSU – Dylan Brown 32-yard field goal, 9:57. Jaguars 7–6. Drive: 5 plays, 18 yards, 2:03.
- NMSU – Anthony Muse 9-yard pass from Tyler Rogers (Dylan Brown kick), 4:08. Aggies 13–7. Drive: 9 plays, 71 yards, 4:10.

Third quarter

- No scoring plays

Fourth quarter

- NMSU – Dylan Brown 39-yard field goal, 14:56. Aggies 16–7. Drive: 9 plays, 59 yards, 3:01.
- USA – Jordan McCray 17-yard pass from Cole Garvin (Gavin Patterson kick), 11:49. Aggies 16–14. Drive: 9 plays, 75 yards, 3:07.
- USA – Gavin Patterson 27-yard field goal, 5:24. Jaguars 17–16. Drive: 8 plays, 73 yards, 3:08.
- NMSU – Conner Cramer 7-yard pass from Tyler Rogers (pass failed), 0:32. Aggies 22–17. Drive: 15 plays, 83 yards, 4:47.

Statistics	USA	NMSU
First downs	21	26
Total yards	353	491
Rushing yards	22	40
Passing yards	331	451
Turnovers	3	1
Time of possession	26:55	33:05

Team	Category	Player	Statistics
South Alabama	Passing	Cole Garvin	22/37, 268 yards, TD, INT
South Alabama	Rushing	Dallas Davis	5 rushes, 15 yards, TD
South Alabama	Receiving	Jamarius Way	7 receptions, 88 yards
New Mexico State	Passing	Tyler Rogers	40/61, 451 yards, 2 TD, INT
New Mexico State	Rushing	Larry Rose III	12 rushes, 52 yards
New Mexico State	Receiving	Jaleel Scott	9 receptions, 134 yards

With the win, the Aggies became bowl eligible for the first time since 2002.

=== Vs. Utah State (Arizona Bowl) ===
2017 Arizona Bowl
New Mexico State Aggies vs. Utah State Aggies – Game summary

Quarter	1	2	3	4	OT	Total
NMSU Aggies	10	3	0	7	6	26
USU Aggies	7	6	0	7	0	20

at Arizona Stadium, Tucson, Arizona

- Date: December 29
- Game time: 3:30 p.m. MST
- Game weather: Sunny, 80 °F (27 °C)
- Game attendance: 39,132
- Referee: Rodney Burnette
- TV announcers (CBSSN): Dave Ryan, Corey Chavous, and Melanie Collins
- Box score, Recap

Game information
First quarter
- NMSU – Dylan Brown 23-yard field goal, 11:15. New Mexico State 3–0. Drive: 12 plays, 59 yards, 3:45.
- USU – Savon Scarver 96-yard kickoff return (Dominik Eberle kick), 11:01. Utah State 7–3.
- NMSU – Jason Huntley 100-yard kickoff return (Dylan Brown kick), 10:47. New Mexico State 10–7.

Second quarter

- USU – Dominik Eberle 35-yard field goal, 14:55. Tied 10–10. Drive: 10 plays, 63 yards, 3:49.
- NMSU – Dylan Brown 33-yard field goal, 11:35. New Mexico State 13–10. Drive: 9 plays, 56 yards, 3:20.
- USU – Dominik Eberle 30-yard field goal, 0:00. Tied 13–13. Drive: 5 plays, 19 yards, 0:36.

Third quarter

- No scoring plays

Fourth quarter

- USU – LaJuan Hunt 1-yard run (Dominik Eberle kick), 13:28. Utah State 20–13. Drive: 4 plays, 24 yards, 0:48.
- NMSU – Jaleel Scott 11-yard pass from Tyler Rogers (Dylan Brown kick), 6:31. Tied 20–20. Drive: 11 plays, 69 yards, 3:47.

Overtime

- NMSU – Larry Rose III 21-yard run. New Mexico State 26–20. Drive: 2 plays, 25 yards.

Statistics	NMSU	USU
First downs	16	22
Total yards	365	441
Rushing yards	174	187
Passing yards	191	254
Turnovers	3	2
Time of possession	28:58	31:02

Team	Category	Player	Statistics
New Mexico State	Passing	Tyler Rogers	29/54, 191 yards, TD, 2 INT
New Mexico State	Rushing	Larry Rose III	16 rushes, 132 yards, TD
New Mexico State	Receiving	Larry Rose III	6 receptions, 48 yards
Utah State	Passing	Jordan Love	25/44, 254 yards
Utah State	Rushing	LaJuan Hunt	20 rushes, 133 yards, TD
Utah State	Receiving	Ron'quavion Tarver	8 receptions, 97 yards
