= 2017 Appalachian State Mountaineers football team =

American college football season

2017 Appalachian State Mountaineers football

Sun Belt co-champion Dollar General Bowl champion

Dollar General Bowl, W 34–0 vs. Toledo
- Conference: Sun Belt Conference
- Record: 9–4 (7–1 Sun Belt)
- Head coach: Scott Satterfield (5th season)
- Co-offensive coordinators: Frank Ponce (5th season); Shawn Clark (2nd season)
- Offensive scheme: Spread option
- Defensive coordinator: Nate Woody (5th season)
- Base defense: 3–4
- Home stadium: Kidd Brewer Stadium

2017 Sun Belt Conference football standings
| | Conf. | | | Overall |
| Team | W | | L | W | | L |
|---|---|---|---|---|---|---|
| Troy + | 7 | – | 1 | 11 | – | 2 |
| Appalachian State + | 7 | – | 1 | 9 | – | 4 |
| Arkansas State | 6 | – | 2 | 7 | – | 5 |
| Georgia State | 5 | – | 3 | 7 | – | 5 |
| New Mexico State | 4 | – | 4 | 7 | – | 6 |
| Louisiana | 4 | – | 4 | 5 | – | 7 |
| Louisiana–Monroe | 4 | – | 4 | 4 | – | 8 |
| Idaho | 3 | – | 5 | 4 | – | 8 |
| South Alabama | 3 | – | 5 | 4 | – | 8 |
| Coastal Carolina * | 2 | – | 6 | 3 | – | 9 |
| Georgia Southern | 2 | – | 6 | 2 | – | 10 |
| Texas State | 1 | – | 7 | 2 | – | 10 |
+ – Conference co-champions; * – Ineligible for postseason play due to FCS-to-FBS transition rules

The 2017 Appalachian State Mountaineers football team represented Appalachian State University in the 2017 NCAA Division I FBS football season. The Mountaineers played their home games at Kidd Brewer Stadium in Boone, North Carolina, and competed in the Sun Belt Conference. They were led by fifth-year head coach Scott Satterfield. They finished the season 9–4, 7–1 in Sun Belt play to earn a share of the Sun Belt championship for the second consecutive year. They received an invite to the Dollar General Bowl where they defeated Toledo for the second consecutive year in a bowl game.

== Schedule ==
Appalachian State announced its 2017 football schedule on March 1, 2017. The 2017 schedule consisted of six home and away games in the regular season. The Mountaineers hosted Sun Belt foes Coastal Carolina, Georgia Southern, North Mexico State, and Louisiana–Lafayette, and traveled to Georgia State, Idaho, Louisiana–Monroe, and Texas State

The Mountaineers hosted two of the four non-conference opponents, Savannah State from the Mid-Eastern Athletic Conference and Wake Forest from the Atlantic Coast Conference, and traveled to Georgia from the Southeastern Conference and UMass, who is independent from a conference.

| Date | Time | Opponent | Site | TV | Result | Attendance |
|---|---|---|---|---|---|---|
| September 2 | 6:15 p.m. | at No. 15 Georgia* | Sanford Stadium; Athens, GA | ESPN | L 10–31 | 92,746 |
| September 9 | 3:30 p.m. | Savannah State* | Kidd Brewer Stadium; Boone, NC | ESPN3 | W 54–7 | 20,109 |
| September 16 | 7:00 p.m. | at Texas State | Bobcat Stadium; San Marcos, TX | ESPN3 | W 20–13 | 19,520 |
| September 23 | 3:30 p.m. | Wake Forest* | Kidd Brewer Stadium; Boone, NC | ESPN3 | L 19–20 | 35,126 |
| October 7 | 3:30 p.m. | New Mexico State^{†} | Kidd Brewer Stadium; Boone, NC | ESPN3 | W 45–31 | 22,787 |
| October 14 | 5:00 p.m. | at Idaho | Kibbie Dome; Moscow, ID | ESPN3 | W 23–20 | 10,168 |
| October 21 | 3:30 p.m. | Coastal Carolina | Kidd Brewer Stadium; Boone, NC | ESPN3 | W 37–29 | 30,179 |
| October 28 | 3:30 p.m. | at UMass* | Warren McGuirk Alumni Stadium; Hadley, MA | ELVN | L 27–30 ^{2OT} | 11,889 |
| November 4 | 3:00 p.m. | at Louisiana–Monroe | Malone Stadium; Monroe, LA | ESPN3 | L 45–52 | 7,397 |
| November 9 | 7:30 p.m. | Georgia Southern | Kidd Brewer Stadium; Boone, NC (rivalry) | ESPNU | W 27–6 | 23,110 |
| November 25 | 2:00 p.m. | at Georgia State | Georgia State Stadium; Atlanta, GA | ESPN3 | W 31–10 | 13,154 |
| December 2 | 2:30 p.m. | Louisiana–Lafayette | Kidd Brewer Stadium; Boone, NC | ESPN3 | W 63–14 | 23,411 |
| December 23 | 7:00 p.m. | vs. Toledo* | Ladd–Peebles Stadium; Mobile, AL (Dollar General Bowl) | ESPN | W 34–0 | 28,706 |
*Non-conference game; ^{†}Homecoming; Rankings from AP Poll released prior to game; All times are in Eastern time

Schedule source:

== Players in the 2018 NFL draft ==
| Player | Position | Round | Pick | NFL club |
| Colby Gossett | G | 6 | 213 | Minnesota Vikings |
