= 2017 Arizona Bowl =

American college football game

2017 Nova Home Loans Arizona Bowl
- 3rd Arizona Bowl
New Mexico State Aggies	Utah State Aggies
(6–6)	(6–6)
Sun Belt	Mountain West
26	20
Head coach: Doug Martin	Head coach: Matt Wells
	1	2	3	4	OT	Total
New Mexico State	10	3	0	7	6	26
Utah State	7	6	0	7	0	20
- Date: December 29, 2017
- Season: 2017
- Stadium: Arizona Stadium
- Location: Tucson, Arizona
- MVP: Larry Rose III (RB, New Mexico State) & Leon McQuaker (LB, New Mexico State)
- Favorite: New Mexico State by 4
- Referee: Rodney Burnette (C-USA)
- Attendance: 39,132
- Payout: US$155,820

United States TV coverage
- Network: CBSSN
- Announcers: Dave Ryan, Corey Chavous and Melanie Collins (sideline)

The 2017 Arizona Bowl was a college football bowl game played on December 29, 2017, at Arizona Stadium in Tucson, Arizona, United States. The third edition of the Arizona Bowl featured the New Mexico State Aggies of the Sun Belt Conference against the Utah State Aggies of the Mountain West Conference. Kickoff was scheduled for 3:30 p.m. MST and the game aired on CBS Sports Network. It was one of the 2017–18 bowl games concluding the 2017 FBS football season. Sponsored by the Nova Home Loans mortgage broker company, the game was officially known as the Nova Home Loans Arizona Bowl. The win for New Mexico State ended a 57-year drought for bowl wins.

== Teams ==
The game featured the New Mexico State Aggies against the Utah State Aggies. It was the 38th all-time meeting between the schools, with Utah State leading the series 30–7. From 1984 until 2000, and again from 2003 until 2012, New Mexico State and Utah State were members of the same conference, spanning the Big West, Sun Belt and WAC until Utah State joined Mountain West in 2013.

=== New Mexico State Aggies ===
This was New Mexico State's fourth bowl game in school history and their first since the 1960 Sun Bowl, which coincidentally saw them play against Utah State; New Mexico State won that game by a score of 20–13. New Mexico State's appearance in this Arizona Bowl snapped their 56-year bowlless streak, which was the longest in all of FBS.

This bowl was also New Mexico State's final game as a member of the Sun Belt before going independent for 2018.

=== Utah State Aggies ===
This was Utah State's first Arizona Bowl.

== Game summary ==
=== Scoring summary ===
Scoring summary

Quarter	Time	Drive			Team	Scoring information	Score	
Quarter	Time	Plays	Yards	TOP	Team	Scoring information	NMSU	USU
1	11:15	12	59	3:45	NMSU	24-yard field goal by Dylan Brown	3	0
1	11:01				USU	Kickoff returned 96 yards for touchdown by Savon Scarver, Dominik Eberle kick good	3	7
1	10:47				NMSU	Kickoff returned 100 yards for touchdown by Jason Huntley, Dylan Brown kick good	10	7
2	14:55	10	63	3:49	USU	24-yard field goal by Dominik Eberle	10	10
2	11:35	9	56	3:20	NMSU	33-yard field goal by Dylan Brown	13	10
2	0:00	5	19	0:36	USU	30-yard field goal by Dominik Eberle	13	13
4	13:28	4	24	0:48	USU	LaJuan Hunt 1-yard touchdown run, Dominik Eberle kick good	13	20
4	6:31	11	69	3:47	NMSU	Jaleel Scott 11-yard touchdown reception from Tyler Rogers, Dylan Brown kick good	20	20
OT		2	25		NMSU	Larry Rose III 21-yard touchdown run, kick not attempted	26	20
"TOP" = time of possession. For other American football terms, see Glossary of American football.							26	20

=== Statistics ===
	1	2	3	4	OT	Total
NMSU Aggies	10	3	0	7	6	26
USU Aggies	7	6	0	7	0	20

Statistics	NMSU	USU
First downs	16	22
Plays–yards	83–375	89–441
Rushes–yards	29–174	45–187
Passing yards	191	254
Passing: Comp–Att–Int	29–54–2	25–44–0
Time of possession	28:58	31:02

Team	Category	Player	Statistics
NMSU	Passing	Tyler Rogers	29/54, 191 yds, 1 TD, 2 INT
NMSU	Rushing	Larry Rose III	16 car, 132 yds, 1 TD
NMSU	Receiving	Johnathan Boone	5 rec, 48 yds
USU	Passing	Jordan Love	25/44, 254 yds
USU	Rushing	LaJuan Hunt	20 car, 133 yds, 1 TD
USU	Receiving	Ron'quavion Tarver	8 rec, 97 yds
