= 2017 Texas State Bobcats football team =

American college football season

2017 Texas State Bobcats football
- Conference: Sun Belt Conference
- Record: 2–10 (1–7 Sun Belt)
- Head coach: Everett Withers (2nd season)
- Offensive coordinator: Zak Kuhr (1st season)
- Co-offensive coordinator: Parker Fleming (1st season)
- Offensive scheme: Spread
- Defensive coordinator: Randall McCray (2nd season)
- Base defense: Multiple
- Home stadium: Bobcat Stadium

2017 Sun Belt Conference football standings
	Conf.			Overall
Team	W		L	W		L
Troy +	7	–	1	11	–	2
Appalachian State +	7	–	1	9	–	4
Arkansas State	6	–	2	7	–	5
Georgia State	5	–	3	7	–	5
New Mexico State	4	–	4	7	–	6
Louisiana	4	–	4	5	–	7
Louisiana–Monroe	4	–	4	4	–	8
Idaho	3	–	5	4	–	8
South Alabama	3	–	5	4	–	8
Coastal Carolina *	2	–	6	3	–	9
Georgia Southern	2	–	6	2	–	10
Texas State	1	–	7	2	–	10
+ – Conference co-champions; * – Ineligible for postseason play due to FCS-to-FBS transition rules

The 2017 Texas State Bobcats football team represented Texas State University in the 2017 NCAA Division I FBS football season. The Bobcats played their home games at Bobcat Stadium in San Marcos, Texas, and competed in the Sun Belt Conference. They were led by second-year head coach Everett Withers. They finished the season 2–10, 1–7 in Sun Belt play to finish in last place.

== Schedule ==
Texas State announced its 2017 football schedule on March 1, 2017. The 2017 schedule consisted of six home and six away games in the regular season. The Bobcats hosted Sun Belt foes Appalachian State, Georgia State, Louisiana–Monroe, and New Mexico State, and traveled to Arkansas State, Coastal Carolina, Louisiana–Lafayette, and Troy.

The Bobcats hosted two of the four non-conference opponents, Houston Baptist from the Southland Conference and UTSA from Conference USA, and traveled to Colorado from the Pac-12 Conference and Wyoming from the Mountain West Conference.

Date	Time	Opponent	Site	TV	Result	Attendance
September 2	6:00 p.m.	Houston Baptist*	Bobcat Stadium; San Marcos, TX	ESPN3	W 20–11	15,560
September 9	1:00 p.m.	at Colorado*	Folsom Field; Boulder, CO	P12N	L 3–37	43,822
September 16	6:00 p.m.	Appalachian State	Bobcat Stadium; San Marcos, TX	ESPN3	L 13–20	19,520
September 23	6:30 p.m.	UTSA*	Bobcat Stadium; San Marcos, TX (I-35 Rivalry)	ESPN3, KEYE, KMYS	L 14–44	31,333
September 30	3:00 p.m.	at Wyoming*	War Memorial Stadium; Laramie, WY	STADIUM	L 10–45	21,784
October 7	2:00 p.m.	Louisiana–Monroe	Bobcat Stadium; San Marcos, TX	ESPN3	L 27–45	12,238
October 12	6:30 p.m.	at Louisiana–Lafayette	Cajun Field; Lafayette, LA	ESPNU	L 7–24	13,106
October 28	5:00 p.m.	at Coastal Carolina	Brooks Stadium; Conway, SC	ESPN3	W 27–7	13,997
November 4	2:00 p.m.	New Mexico State^{†}	Bobcat Stadium; San Marcos, TX	ESPN3	L 35–45	12,012
November 11	3:00 p.m.	Georgia State	Bobcat Stadium; San Marcos, TX	ESPN3	L 30–33	14,017
November 18	2:00 p.m.	at Arkansas State	Centennial Bank Stadium; Jonesboro, AR	ESPN3	L 12–30	19,846
November 25	3:00 p.m.	at Troy	Veterans Memorial Stadium; Troy, AL	ESPN3	L 9–62	20,737
*Non-conference game; ^{†}Homecoming; All times are in Central time

== Game summaries ==
=== Houston Baptist ===
	1	2	3	4	Total
Huskies	9	0	0	2	11
Bobcats	0	10	7	3	20

=== At Colorado ===
	1	2	3	4	Total
Bobcats	0	0	3	0	3
Buffaloes	7	7	17	6	37

=== Appalachian State ===
	1	2	3	4	Total
Mountaineers	0	7	10	3	20
Bobcats	7	3	0	3	13

=== UTSA ===
	1	2	3	4	Total
Roadrunners	10	17	3	14	44
Bobcats	7	7	0	0	14

=== At Wyoming ===
	1	2	3	4	Total
Bobcats	0	10	0	0	10
Cowboys	0	31	14	0	45

=== Louisiana–Monroe ===
	1	2	3	4	Total
Warhawks	19	7	9	10	45
Bobcats	20	0	0	7	27

=== At Louisiana–Lafayette ===
	1	2	3	4	Total
Bobcats	0	0	7	0	7
Ragin' Cajuns	14	0	3	7	24

=== At Coastal Carolina ===
	1	2	3	4	Total
Bobcats	7	10	3	7	27
Chanticleers	7	0	0	0	7

=== New Mexico State ===
	1	2	3	4	Total
Aggies	7	10	14	14	45
Bobcats	14	7	7	7	35

=== Georgia State ===
	1	2	3	4	Total
Panthers	10	3	10	10	33
Bobcats	7	7	3	13	30

=== At Arkansas State ===
	1	2	3	4	Total
Bobcats	6	0	6	0	12
Red Wolves	16	0	14	0	30

=== At Troy ===
	1	2	3	4	Total
Bobcats	0	0	6	3	9
Trojans	17	24	14	7	62

== Coaching staff ==
After the 2016 season, Texas State lost several coaches to other programs, e.g. Mississippi State, Notre Dame, and Boston College. Withers reached into his past to hire Zak Kuhr from Rutgers. Kuhr was formerly the running backs coach at James Madison University under Coach Withers in 2014 and 2015, adding the co-offensive coordinator title in 2015. Withers filled the remaining openings on the staff with Eric Mateos from LSU and by promoting graduate assistant Preston Mason to full-time.

Name	Position	Year	Former Texas State positions held	Alma mater
Everett Withers	Head Coach	2016		Appalachian State 1985
Randall McCray	Assistant Head Coach/Defensive Coordinator/Linebackers	2016		Appalachian State 1991
Zak Kuhr	Offensive Coordinator/Running Backs	2017		Florida 2013
Parker Fleming	Co-Offensive Coordinator/Quarterbacks	2016	Wide Receivers/Special Teams Coordinator	Presbyterian 2010
Preston Mason	Safeties	2017	Defensive Graduate Assistant 2016	Appalachian State 2014
Adrian Mayes	Tight Ends/Recruiting Coordinator	2016	Offensive Line	Kansas 2008
Ron Antoine	Wide Receivers	2016	Running Backs/Tight Ends	Colorado State 1997
Jules Montinar	Cornerbacks	2016		Eastern Kentucky 2009
Issac Mooring	Defensive Line	2017		North Carolina 2003
Eric Mateos	Offensive Line	2017		Southwest Baptist 2011
John Streicher	Director of Football Operations	2016		Ohio State 2012
Michael George	Director of Player Personnel	2016		Washington University in St. Louis 2005
Clayton Barnes	Director of Player Development	2017	Offensive Line Intern 2016	Texas A&M 2015
