= 2017 Sun Belt Conference football season =

- League: NCAA Division I FBS
- Sport: Football
- Duration: August 31, 2017 through January 2018
- Teams: 12
- TV partner(s): ESPN, ESPN3, Cox Sports Television

2018 NFL Draft
- Top draft pick: S Tracy Walker, Louisiana
- Picked by: Detroit Lions, 82nd overall

Regular Season
- Season champions: Troy; Appalachian State
- Runners-up: Arkansas State
- Season MVP: Ja'Von Rolland-Jones

Football seasons
- 2016 2018

2017 Sun Belt Conference football standings
| | Conf. | | | Overall |
| Team | W | | L | W | | L |
|---|---|---|---|---|---|---|
| Troy + | 7 | – | 1 | 11 | – | 2 |
| Appalachian State + | 7 | – | 1 | 9 | – | 4 |
| Arkansas State | 6 | – | 2 | 7 | – | 5 |
| Georgia State | 5 | – | 3 | 7 | – | 5 |
| New Mexico State | 4 | – | 4 | 7 | – | 6 |
| Louisiana | 4 | – | 4 | 5 | – | 7 |
| Louisiana–Monroe | 4 | – | 4 | 4 | – | 8 |
| Idaho | 3 | – | 5 | 4 | – | 8 |
| South Alabama | 3 | – | 5 | 4 | – | 8 |
| Coastal Carolina * | 2 | – | 6 | 3 | – | 9 |
| Georgia Southern | 2 | – | 6 | 2 | – | 10 |
| Texas State | 1 | – | 7 | 2 | – | 10 |
+ – Conference co-champions; * – Ineligible for postseason play due to FCS-to-FBS transition rules

The 2017 Sun Belt conference football season began on August 31, 2017 and ended on December 2, 2017. It was part of the 2017 season of the Football Bowl Subdivision (FBS), the top level of NCAA Division I football.

This was the first season for Coastal Carolina, which was in its second and final transitional season from the Division I Football Championship Subdivision (FCS) to FBS. This was also the final season for both Idaho and New Mexico State as associate members of the conference; New Mexico State will remain in the FBS as an independent program, while Idaho will move down to the FCS level in its main conference, the Big Sky Conference.

== Rankings ==
| | | Pre | Wk 1 | Wk 2 | Wk 3 | Wk 4 | Wk 5 | Wk 6 | Wk 7 | Wk 8 | Wk 9 | Wk 10 | Wk 11 | Wk 12 | Wk 13 | Wk 14 | Final |
|---|---|---|---|---|---|---|---|---|---|---|---|---|---|---|---|---|---|
| Appalachian State | AP | RV | — | — | — | — | — | — | — | — | — | — | — | — | — | — | — |
| Appalachian State | C | RV | — | RV | RV | RV | — | — | — | RV | — | — | — | — | — | — | RV |
| Appalachian State | CFP | Not released | | | | | | | | | — | — | — | — | — | — | |
| Arkansas State | AP | — | — | — | — | — | — | — | — | — | — | — | — | — | — | — | — |
| Arkansas State | C | — | — | — | — | — | — | — | — | — | — | — | — | — | — | — | — |
| Arkansas State | CFP | Not released | | | | | | | | | — | — | — | — | — | — | |
| Coastal Carolina | AP | — | — | — | — | — | — | — | — | — | — | — | — | — | — | — | — |
| Coastal Carolina | C | — | — | — | — | — | — | — | — | — | — | — | — | — | — | — | — |
| Coastal Carolina | CFP | Not released | | | | | | | | | — | — | — | — | — | — | |
| Georgia Southern | AP | — | — | — | — | — | — | — | — | — | — | — | — | — | — | — | — |
| Georgia Southern | C | — | — | — | — | — | — | — | — | — | — | — | — | — | — | — | — |
| Georgia Southern | CFP | Not released | | | | | | | | | — | — | — | — | — | — | |
| Georgia State | AP | — | — | — | — | — | — | — | — | — | — | — | — | — | — | — | — |
| Georgia State | C | — | — | — | — | — | — | — | — | — | — | — | — | — | — | — | — |
| Georgia State | CFP | Not released | | | | | | | | | — | — | — | — | — | — | |
| Idaho | AP | — | — | — | — | — | — | — | — | — | — | — | — | — | — | — | — |
| Idaho | C | — | — | — | — | — | — | — | — | — | — | — | — | — | — | — | — |
| Idaho | CFP | Not released | | | | | | | | | — | — | — | — | — | — | |
| Louisiana | AP | — | — | — | — | — | — | — | — | — | — | — | — | — | — | — | — |
| Louisiana | C | — | — | — | — | — | — | — | — | — | — | — | — | — | — | — | — |
| Louisiana | CFP | Not released | | | | | | | | | — | — | — | — | — | — | |
| Louisiana–Monroe | AP | — | — | — | — | — | — | — | — | — | — | — | — | — | — | — | — |
| Louisiana–Monroe | C | — | — | — | — | — | — | — | — | — | — | — | — | — | — | — | — |
| Louisiana–Monroe | CFP | Not released | | | | | | | | | — | — | — | — | — | — | |
| New Mexico State | AP | — | — | — | — | — | — | — | — | — | — | — | — | — | — | — | — |
| New Mexico State | C | — | — | — | — | — | — | — | — | — | — | — | — | — | — | — | — |
| New Mexico State | CFP | Not released | | | | | | | | | — | — | — | — | — | — | |
| South Alabama | AP | — | — | — | — | — | — | — | — | — | — | — | — | — | — | — | — |
| South Alabama | C | — | — | — | — | — | — | — | — | — | — | — | — | — | — | — | — |
| South Alabama | CFP | Not released | | | | | | | | | — | — | — | — | — | — | |
| Texas State | AP | — | — | — | — | — | — | — | — | — | — | — | — | — | — | — | — |
| Texas State | C | — | — | — | — | — | — | — | — | — | — | — | — | — | — | — | — |
| Texas State | CFP | Not released | | | | | | | | | — | — | — | — | — | — | |
| Troy | AP | — | — | — | — | — | RV | — | — | — | — | — | — | — | RV | RV | RV |
| Troy | C | RV | — | — | — | RV | RV | RV | — | RV | RV | RV | RV | RV | RV | RV | RV |
| Troy | CFP | Not released | | | | | | | | | — | — | — | — | — | — | |

Legend
| | Improvement in ranking |
| | Drop in ranking |
| | Not ranked previous week |
| | No change in ranking from previous week |
| RV | Received votes but were not ranked in Top 25 of poll |
| т | Tied with team above or below also with this symbol |

== Records against FBS conferences ==
| Conference | Record |
|---|---|
| The American | 0–3 |
| ACC | 0–2 |
| Big Ten | 0–3 |
| Big 12 | 0–1 |
| C-USA | 1–4 |
| Independents | 1–2 |
| MAC | 1–1 |
| Mountain West | 1–3 |
| Pac-12 | 0–2 |
| SEC | 1–7 |
| Total | 5–28 |

=== Power Five conferences and independents ===
| Conference | Record |
|---|---|
| ACC | 0–2 |
| Big Ten | 0–3 |
| Big 12 | 0–1 |
| Pac-12 | 0–2 |
| SEC | 1–7 |
| Notre Dame | 0–0 |
| Total | 1–15 |

=== Group of Five conferences ===
| Conference | Record |
|---|---|
| The American | 0–3 |
| C-USA | 1–4 |
| Independents (excluding Notre Dame) | 1–2 |
| MAC | 1–1 |
| Mountain West | 1–3 |
| Total | 4–13 |

=== FCS Subdivision ===
| FCS Opponents | Record |
|---|---|
| Football Championship Subdivision | 7–2 |
| Total FCS Record | 0–0 |

=== Postseason ===
| Power 5 Conferences | Record |
|---|---|
| ACC | 0–0 |
| Big Ten | 0–0 |
| Big 12 | 0–0 |
| Pac-12 | 0–0 |
| SEC | 0–0 |
| Power 5 Total | 0–0 |
| Other FBS Conferences | Record |
| American | 0–0 |
| C–USA | 2–1 |
| Independents (Excluding Notre Dame) | 0–0 |
| MAC | 1–0 |
| Mountain West | 1–0 |
| Other FBS Total | 4–1 |
| Total Bowl Record | 4–1 |

== Awards and honors ==
=== Individual awards ===
- Player of the Year: Ja'Von Rolland-Jones, Sr., DL, Arkansas State
- Offensive Player of the Year: Justice Hansen, Jr., QB, Arkansas State
- Defensive Player of the Year: Jeremy Reaves, Sr., DB, South Alabama
- Freshman of the Year: Marcus Jones, DB/KR, Troy
- Newcomer of the Year: Ron LaForce, Jr., DB, New Mexico State
- Coach of the Year: Neal Brown, Troy

=== All-Conference teams ===
Offense:

| Pos. | Name | Yr. | School | Pos. | Name | Yr. | School | Pos. | Name | Yr. | School |
|---|---|---|---|---|---|---|---|---|---|---|---|
| First Team | | | | Second Team | | | | Third Team | | | |
| QB | Justice Hansen | Jr. | Arkansas State | QB | Taylor Lamb | Sr. | Appalachian State | QB | Tyler Rogers | R-Sr. | New Mexico State |
| RB | Jalin Moore | Jr. | Appalachian State | RB | Larry Rose III | Sr. | New Mexico State | RB | Osharmar Abercrombie | Sr. | Coastal Carolina |
| RB | Aaron Duckworth | Jr. | Idaho | RB | Jordan Chunn | Sr. | Troy | RB | Trey Ragas | R-Fr. | Louisiana |
| WR | Ike Lewis | Sr. | Appalachian State | WR | Chris Murray | Sr. | Arkansas State | WR | Justin McInnis | Jr. | Arkansas State |
| WR | Penny Hart | R-So. | Georgia State | WR | Jamarius Way | Jr. | South Alabama | WR | Malcolm Williams | Jr. | Coastal Carolina |
| WR | Jaleel Scott | R-Sr. | New Mexico State | WR | Deondre Douglas | Jr. | Troy | WR | RJ Turner | So. | Louisiana–Monroe |
| TE | Blake Mack | Sr. | Appalachian State | TE | Gabe Schrade | Sr. | Texas State | TE | Chase Rogers | Fr. | Louisiana |
| OL | Colby Gossett | Sr. | Arkansas State | OL | Noah Johnson | So. | Idaho | OL | Jaypee Philbert | Sr. | Arkansas State |
| OL | Beau Nunn | Sr. | Appalachian State | OL | Kevin Dotson | So. | Louisiana | OL | Grant Horst | Sr. | Louisiana |
| OL | Victor Johnson | So. | Appalachian State | OL | Noah Fisher | Jr. | South Alabama | OL | Frank Sutton | Sr. | Louisiana–Monroe |
| OL | Lanard Bonner | R-Jr. | Arkansas State | OL | Deontae Crumitie | Jr. | Troy | OL | Aaron Brewer | So. | Texas State |
| OL | Steven Rowzee | Sr. | Troy | OL | Tristan Crowder | So. | Troy | OL | Kirk Kelley | So. | Troy |

Defense:

| Pos. | Name | Yr. | School | Pos. | Name | Yr. | School | Pos. | Name | Yr. | School |
|---|---|---|---|---|---|---|---|---|---|---|---|
| First Team | | | | Second Team | | | | Third Team | | | |
| DL | Tee Sims | Sr. | Appalachian State | DL | Ronheen Bingham | Jr. | Arkansas State | DL | Caleb Fuller | Sr. | Appalachian State |
| DL | Ja'Von Rolland-Jones | R-Sr. | Arkansas State | DL | Logan Hunt | Jr. | Georgia Southern | DL | Caleb Caston | Sr. | Arkansas State |
| DL | Aikeem Coleman | Sr. | Idaho | DL | Jamal Stadom | Sr. | Troy | DL | Marterious Allen | Jr. | Georgia State |
| DL | Cedric Wilcots II | R-So. | New Mexico State | DL | Trevon Sanders | Jr. | Troy | DL | Joe Dillon | So. | Louisiana |
| DL | Hunter Reese | Jr. | Troy | LB | Kyle Wilson | Sr. | Arkansas State | LB | Devan Stringer | Sr. | Appalachian State |
| LB | Eric Boggs | Sr. | Appalachian State | LB | Shane Johnson | Sr. | Coastal Carolina | LB | Michael Shaw | R-Jr. | Georgia State |
| LB | Tony Lashley | Jr. | Idaho | LB | Kaden Elliss | Jr. | Idaho | LB | Frankie Griffin | Jr. | Texas State |
| LB | Dalton Herrington | Sr. | New Mexico State | LB | Tron Folsom | So. | Troy | DB | A.J. Howard | Sr. | Appalachian State |
| DB | Clifton Duck | So. | Appalachian State | DB | Tae Hayes | Jr. | Appalachian State | DB | Chandon Sullivan | Sr. | Georgia State |
| DB | Blaise Taylor | Sr. | Arkansas State | DB | Justin Clifton | Jr. | Arkansas State | DB | Tracy Walker | Sr. | Louisiana |
| DB | Jeremy Reaves | Sr. | South Alabama | DB | Monquavion Brinson | So. | Georgia Southern | DB | Shamad Lomax | So. | New Mexico State |
| DB | Blace Brown | Jr. | Troy | DB | Ron LaForce | Jr. | New Mexico State | DB | Cedarius Rookard | Jr. | Troy |

Special Teams:

| Pos. | Name | Yr. | School | Pos. | Name | Yr. | School | Pos. | Name | Yr. | School |
|---|---|---|---|---|---|---|---|---|---|---|---|
| First Team | | | | Second Team | | | | Third Team | | | |
| PK | Gavin Patterson | Jr. | South Alabama | PK | Tyler Bass | R-So. | Georgia Southern | PK | Sawyer Williams | R-So. | Arkansas State |
| P | Corliss Waitman | Jr. | South Alabama | P | Cade Coffey | R-Fr. | Idaho | P | Cody Grace | R-So. | Arkansas State |
| RS | Marcus Green | Jr. | Louisiana–Monroe | RS | Marcus Jones | Fr. | Troy | RS | Blaise Taylor | Sr. | Arkansas State |
| AP | Marcus Green | Jr. | Louisiana–Monroe | AP | Marcus Jones | Fr. | Troy | AP | Glenn Smith | Sr. | Georgia State |

Ref:

== Home attendance ==
| Team | Stadium | Capacity | Game 1 | Game 2 | Game 3 | Game 4 | Game 5 | Game 6 | Total | Average | % of Capacity |
|---|---|---|---|---|---|---|---|---|---|---|---|
| Appalachian State | Kidd Brewer Stadium | 30,000 | 20,109 | **35,126**† | 22,787 | **30,179** | 23,110 | 23,411 | 154,722 | 25,787 | 85.96% |
| Arkansas State | Centennial Bank Stadium | 30,382 | 24,371 | 25,916† | 21,943 | 19,846 | 27,462 | | 119,538 | 23,908 | 78.69% |
| Coastal Carolina | Brooks Stadium | 15,000 | 13,274 | 14,996 | **15,991**† | 13,997 | **15,545** | **15,951** | 89,754 | 14,959 | 99.73% |
| Georgia State | Georgia State Stadium | 24,333 | 24,333† | 15,388 | 12,125 | 13,154 | 14,163 | | 79,163 | 15,833 | 65.07% |
| Georgia Southern | Paulson Stadium | 25,000 | 13,781 | 16,278 | 18,722† | 12,250 | | | 61,031 | 15,258 | 61.03% |
| Idaho | Kibbie Dome | 16,000 | 10,526 | 10,156 | 14,198† | 10,168 | 10,705 | 7,444 | 63,197 | 10,533 | 65.83% |
| Louisiana | Cajun Field | 36,900 | 18,289 | 18,318† | 13,106 | 16,058 | 12,993 | | 78,764 | 15,753 | 42.69% |
| Louisiana–Monroe | Malone Stadium | 30,427 | 11,061 | 10,359 | 12,578† | 7,397 | 8,245 | | 49,640 | 9,928 | 32.63% |
| New Mexico State | Aggie Memorial Stadium | 30,343 | 15,446 | 17,546 | 10,041 | 21,894 | 26,286† | | 91,213 | 18,243 | 60.12% |
| South Alabama | Ladd–Peebles Stadium | 33,471 | 26,487† | 18,103 | 12,603 | 16,495 | 12,742 | 17,640 | 104,070 | 17,345 | 51.82% |
| Texas State | Bobcat Stadium | 30,000 | 15,560 | 19,520 | **31,333**† | 12,238 | 12,012 | 14,017 | 104,680 | 17,447 | 58.16% |
| Troy | Veterans Memorial Stadium | 30,402 | 29,278† | 27,324 | 25,211 | 23,846 | 20,341 | 20,737 | 146,737 | 24,456 | 80.44% |

Bold: Exceeded capacity
†Season High

== NFL draft ==
The following list includes all Sun Belt players who were drafted in the 2018 NFL draft.

| Round # | Pick # | NFL team | Player | Position | College |
|---|---|---|---|---|---|
| 3 | 82 | Detroit Lions | Tracy Walker | S | Louisiana |
| 4 | 132 | Baltimore Ravens | Jaleel Scott | WR | New Mexico State |
| 6 | 188 | Cleveland Browns | Simeon Thomas | CB | Louisiana |
| 6 | 213 | Minnesota Vikings | Colby Gossett | G | Appalachian State |
