= 2017 Coastal Carolina Chanticleers football team =

American college football season

2017 Coastal Carolina Chanticleers football
- Conference: Sun Belt Conference
- Record: 3–9 (2–6 Sun Belt)
- Head coach: Jamey Chadwell (interim, 1st season)
- Offensive coordinator: Jamey Chadwell (1st season)
- Offensive scheme: Up-tempo spread
- Defensive coordinator: Mickey Matthews (2nd season)
- Base defense: 4–3
- Home stadium: Brooks Stadium

2017 Sun Belt Conference football standings
	Conf.			Overall
Team	W		L	W		L
Troy +	7	–	1	11	–	2
Appalachian State +	7	–	1	9	–	4
Arkansas State	6	–	2	7	–	5
Georgia State	5	–	3	7	–	5
New Mexico State	4	–	4	7	–	6
Louisiana	4	–	4	5	–	7
Louisiana–Monroe	4	–	4	4	–	8
Idaho	3	–	5	4	–	8
South Alabama	3	–	5	4	–	8
Coastal Carolina *	2	–	6	3	–	9
Georgia Southern	2	–	6	2	–	10
Texas State	1	–	7	2	–	10
+ – Conference co-champions; * – Ineligible for postseason play due to FCS-to-FBS transition rules

The 2017 Coastal Carolina Chanticleers football team represented Coastal Carolina University as a member of the Sun Belt Conference the 2017 NCAA Division I FBS football season. The Chanticleers were led by interim head coach Jamey Chadwell, who also served as offensive coordinator, while permanent head coach Joe Moglia was on leave due to medical issues. The season marked the Chanticleers' first year in the Sun Belt and the FBS, and their second of a two-year transition period. They did not become bowl-eligible until the 2018 season. Coastal Carolina compiled an overall record of 3–9 with a mark of 2–6 in conference play, tying for tenth place in the Sun Belt. The team played home games at Brooks Stadium in Conway, South Carolina.

== Schedule ==
Coastal Carolina announced its 2017 football schedule on March 1, 2017. The 2017 schedule consisted of six home and away games in the regular season. The Chanticleers hosted Sun Belt foes Georgia Southern, Georgia State, Texas State, and Troy, and traveled to Appalachian State, Arkansas State, Idaho, and Louisiana–Monroe

The Chanticleers hosted two of the four non-conference opponents, Massachusetts, who was independent from a conference and Western Illinois from the FCS Missouri Valley Football Conference, and traveled to Arkansas from the Southeastern Conference and UAB from Conference USA.

Date	Time	Opponent	Site	TV	Result	Attendance
September 2	7:00 p.m.	UMass*	Brooks Stadium; Conway, SC	ESPN3	W 38–28	13,274
September 16	12:00 p.m.	at UAB*	Legion Field; Birmingham, AL	WMBF-TV	L 23–30	24,789
September 23	6:30 p.m.	No. 19 Western Illinois*	Brooks Stadium; Conway, SC	ESPN3	L 10–52	14,996
September 30	6:00 p.m.	at Louisiana–Monroe	Malone Stadium; Monroe, LA	ESPN3	L 43–51	10,359
October 7	6:30 p.m.	Georgia State	Brooks Stadium; Conway, SC	ESPN3	L 21–27	15,991
October 14	7:00 p.m.	at Arkansas State	Centennial Bank Stadium; Jonesboro, AR	ESPN3	L 17–51	25,916
October 21	3:30 p.m.	at Appalachian State	Kidd Brewer Stadium; Boone, NC	ESPN3	L 29–37	30,179
October 28	6:00 p.m.	Texas State^{†}	Brooks Stadium; Conway, SC	ESPN3	L 7–27	13,997
November 4	4:00 p.m.	at Arkansas*	Donald W. Reynolds Razorback Stadium; Fayetteville, AR	SECN	L 38–39	61,476
November 11	4:30 p.m.	Troy	Brooks Stadium; Conway, SC	ESPN3	L 17–42	15,545
November 18	5:00 p.m.	at Idaho	Kibbie Dome; Moscow, ID	ESPN3	W 13–7	7,444
December 2	1:00 p.m.	Georgia Southern	Brooks Stadium; Conway, SC	ESPN3	W 28–17	15,951
*Non-conference game; ^{†}Homecoming; Rankings from STATS Poll released prior to the game; All times are in Eastern time

== Game summaries ==
=== UMass ===
	1	2	3	4	Total
Minutemen	7	7	7	7	28
Chanticleers	14	7	10	7	38

=== At UAB ===
	1	2	3	4	Total
Chanticleers	2	3	8	10	23
Blazers	13	3	7	7	30

=== Western Illinois ===
	1	2	3	4	Total
No. 19 (FCS) Leathernecks	7	14	21	10	52
Chanticleers	10	0	0	0	10

=== At Louisiana–Monroe ===
	1	2	3	4	Total
Chanticleers	15	7	8	13	43
Warhawks	10	21	14	6	51

=== Georgia State ===
	1	2	3	4	Total
Panthers	14	7	0	6	27
Chanticleers	0	7	0	14	21

=== At Arkansas State ===
	1	2	3	4	Total
Chanticleers	0	7	0	10	17
Red Wolves	7	10	17	17	51

=== At Appalachian State ===
	1	2	3	4	Total
Chanticleers	3	16	3	7	29
Mountaineers	14	3	6	14	37

=== Texas State ===
	1	2	3	4	Total
Bobcats	7	10	3	7	27
Chanticleers	7	0	0	0	7

=== At Arkansas ===
	1	2	3	4	Total
Chanticleers	7	7	17	7	38
Razorbacks	7	10	8	14	39

=== Troy ===
	1	2	3	4	Total
Trojans	14	14	7	7	42
Chanticleers	10	0	7	0	17

=== At Idaho ===
	1	2	3	4	Total
Chanticleers	0	10	0	3	13
Vandals	7	0	0	0	7

=== Georgia Southern ===
	1	2	3	4	Total
Eagles	3	7	7	0	17
Chanticleers	7	7	14	0	28
