= Ja'Von Rolland-Jones =

American football player (born 1994)

No. 95
- Position: Linebacker

Personal information
- Born: November 13, 1994 (age 31); Mesquite, Texas, U.S.
- Listed height: 6 ft 2 in (1.88 m)
- Listed weight: 253 lb (115 kg)

Career information
- High school: Mesquite
- College: Arkansas State (2013–2017)
- NFL draft: 2018: undrafted

Career history
- Cincinnati Bengals (2018)*; Los Angeles Rams (2018)*; Baltimore Brigade (2019); Winnipeg Blue Bombers (2019)*; Montreal Alouettes (2019); Ottawa Redblacks (2022)*
- * Offseason or practice squad member only

Awards and highlights
- 2× Sun Belt Player of the Year (2016, 2017); 3× First-team All-Sun Belt (2015, 2016, 2017); Second-team All-Sun Belt (2014)
- Stats at Pro Football Reference

Ja'Von Rolland-Jones (born November 13, 1994) is an American former professional football linebacker. He played college football for the Arkansas State Red Wolves and was signed by the Cincinnati Bengals as an undrafted free agent after the 2018 NFL draft.

== Professional career ==
=== Cincinnati Bengals ===
Rolland-Jones was signed by the Cincinnati Bengals as an undrafted free agent on May 11, 2018. He was waived on August 2, 2018.

=== Los Angeles Rams ===
On October 2, 2018, Rolland-Jones was signed to the Los Angeles Rams practice squad. He was released on November 6, 2018.

=== Baltimore Brigade ===
On April 22, 2019, Rolland-Jones was assigned to the Baltimore Brigade.

=== Winnipeg Blue Bombers ===
Rolland-Jones signed with the Winnipeg Blue Bombers of the Canadian Football League (CFL) on April 30, 2019. He was released on May 18, 2019.

=== Montreal Alouettes ===
Rolland-Jones was signed to the practice roster of the Montreal Alouettes of the CFL on September 10, 2019. He was promoted to the active roster on October 11. He dressed in four games, starting two, for the Alouettes during the 2019 season, recording nine defensive tackles and one sack. Rolland-Jones was placed on injured reserve on November 9, 2019. The 2020 CFL season was cancelled due to the COVID-19 pandemic, and Rolland-Jones became a free agent in February 2021.

=== Ottawa Redblacks ===
Rolland-Jones signed with the CFL's Ottawa Redblacks on May 9, 2022. He was placed on the reserve/retired list on May 20, 2022.
