= 2017 South Alabama Jaguars football team =

American college football season

2017 South Alabama Jaguars football
- Conference: Sun Belt Conference
- Record: 4–8 (3–5 Sun Belt)
- Head coach: Joey Jones (9th season)
- Offensive coordinator: Bryant Vincent (3rd season; first 3 games); Richard Owens (interim; remainder of season)
- Offensive scheme: Spread
- Defensive coordinator: Kane Wommack (2nd season)
- Base defense: 4–2–5
- Home stadium: Ladd–Peebles Stadium

2017 Sun Belt Conference football standings
	Conf.			Overall
Team	W		L	W		L
Troy +	7	–	1	11	–	2
Appalachian State +	7	–	1	9	–	4
Arkansas State	6	–	2	7	–	5
Georgia State	5	–	3	7	–	5
New Mexico State	4	–	4	7	–	6
Louisiana	4	–	4	5	–	7
Louisiana–Monroe	4	–	4	4	–	8
Idaho	3	–	5	4	–	8
South Alabama	3	–	5	4	–	8
Coastal Carolina *	2	–	6	3	–	9
Georgia Southern	2	–	6	2	–	10
Texas State	1	–	7	2	–	10
+ – Conference co-champions; * – Ineligible for postseason play due to FCS-to-FBS transition rules

The 2017 South Alabama Jaguars football team represented the University of South Alabama in the 2017 NCAA Division I FBS football season. The Jaguars played their home games at Ladd–Peebles Stadium in Mobile, Alabama, and competed in the Sun Belt Conference. They were led by ninth-year head coach Joey Jones. They finished the season 4–8, 3–5 in Sun Belt play to finish in a tie for eighth place.

On November 20 following a 52–0 loss to previously winless Georgia Southern, head coach Joey Jones, the only head coach in South Alabama football history, announced his resignation. He stayed on to coach the final game of the season and finished at South Alabama with a nine-year record of 52–50. On December 7, the school hired Steve Campbell as head coach.

== Schedule ==
South Alabama announced its 2017 football schedule on March 1, 2017. The 2017 schedule consisted of six home and away games in the regular season. The Jaguars hosted Sun Belt foes Arkansas State, Idaho, Louisiana–Lafayette, and Louisiana–Monroe, and will travel to Georgia Southern, Georgia State, New Mexico State, and Troy.

The Jaguars hosted two of the four non-conference opponents, Alabama A&M from the Southwestern Athletic Conference and Oklahoma State from the Big 12 Conference, and traveled to Louisiana Tech from Conference USA and Ole Miss from the Southeastern Conference.

Date	Time	Opponent	Site	TV	Result	Attendance
September 2	6:30 p.m.	at Ole Miss*	Vaught–Hemingway Stadium; Oxford, MS	ESPNU	L 27–47	62,532
September 8	7:00 p.m.	No. 11 Oklahoma State*	Ladd–Peebles Stadium; Mobile, AL	ESPN2	L 7–44	26,487
September 16	6:00 p.m.	Alabama A&M*	Ladd–Peebles Stadium; Mobile, AL	ESPN3	W 45–0	18,103
September 23	1:00 p.m.	Idaho	Ladd–Peebles Stadium; Mobile, AL	ESPN3	L 23–29 ^{2OT}	12,603
September 30	6:00 p.m.	at Louisiana Tech*	Joe Aillet Stadium; Ruston, LA	ESPN3	L 16–34	22,013
October 11	7:00 p.m.	at Troy	Veterans Memorial Stadium; Troy, AL (Battle for the Belt)	ESPN2	W 19–8	25,211
October 21	4:00 p.m.	Louisiana–Monroe^{†}	Ladd–Peebles Stadium; Mobile, AL	ESPN3	W 33–23	16,495
October 26	6:30 p.m.	at Georgia State	Georgia State Stadium; Atlanta, GA	ESPNU	L 13–21	12,125
November 4	3:00 p.m.	Louisiana–Lafayette	Ladd–Peebles Stadium; Mobile, AL	ESPN3	L 14–19	12,742
November 11	4:00 p.m.	Arkansas State	Ladd–Peebles Stadium; Mobile, AL	ESPN3	W 24–19	17,640
November 18	2:00 p.m.	at Georgia Southern	Paulson Stadium; Statesboro, GA	ESPN3	L 0–52	12,250
December 2	3:00 p.m.	at New Mexico State	Aggie Memorial Stadium; Las Cruces, NM	ESPN3	L 17–22	26,268
*Non-conference game; ^{†}Homecoming; Rankings from AP Poll released prior to the game; All times are in Central time

== Game summaries ==
=== At Ole Miss ===
	1	2	3	4	Total
Jaguars	0	10	3	14	27
Rebels	10	3	27	7	47

=== No. 11 Oklahoma State ===
	1	2	3	4	Total
Cowboys	17	3	21	3	44
Jaguars	0	0	0	7	7

=== Alabama A&M ===
	1	2	3	4	Total
Bulldogs	0	0	0	0	0
Jaguars	24	7	14	0	45

=== Idaho ===
	1	2	3	4	OT	2OT	Total
Vandals	3	7	0	10	3	6	29
Jaguars	10	3	0	7	3	0	23

=== At Louisiana Tech ===
	1	2	3	4	Total
Jaguars	7	6	3	0	16
Bulldogs	14	3	0	17	34

=== At Troy ===
	1	2	3	4	Total
Jaguars	7	2	7	3	19
Trojans	0	0	0	8	8

=== Louisiana–Monroe ===
	1	2	3	4	Total
Warhawks	7	13	3	0	23
Jaguars	14	10	6	3	33

=== At Georgia State ===
	1	2	3	4	Total
Jaguars	0	3	3	7	13
Panthers	7	7	0	7	21

=== Louisiana–Lafayette ===
	1	2	3	4	Total
Ragin' Cajuns	3	16	0	0	19
Jaguars	0	7	0	7	14

=== Arkansas State ===
	1	2	3	4	Total
Red Wolves	0	6	6	7	19
Jaguars	10	0	7	7	24

=== At Georgia Southern ===
	1	2	3	4	Total
Jaguars	0	0	0	0	0
Eagles	21	10	14	7	52

=== At New Mexico State ===
	1	2	3	4	Total
Jaguars	0	7	0	10	17
Aggies	0	13	0	9	22
