= 2017 Idaho Vandals football team =

American college football season

2017 Idaho Vandals football
- Conference: Sun Belt Conference
- Record: 4–8 (3–5 Sun Belt)
- Head coach: Paul Petrino (5th season)
- Offensive coordinator: Kris Cinkovich (5th season)
- Offensive scheme: Multiple
- Defensive coordinator: Mike Breske (3rd season)
- Base defense: Multiple 3–4
- Home stadium: Kibbie Dome

2017 Sun Belt Conference football standings
	Conf.			Overall
Team	W		L	W		L
Troy +	7	–	1	11	–	2
Appalachian State +	7	–	1	9	–	4
Arkansas State	6	–	2	7	–	5
Georgia State	5	–	3	7	–	5
New Mexico State	4	–	4	7	–	6
Louisiana	4	–	4	5	–	7
Louisiana–Monroe	4	–	4	4	–	8
Idaho	3	–	5	4	–	8
South Alabama	3	–	5	4	–	8
Coastal Carolina *	2	–	6	3	–	9
Georgia Southern	2	–	6	2	–	10
Texas State	1	–	7	2	–	10
+ – Conference co-champions; * – Ineligible for postseason play due to FCS-to-FBS transition rules

The 2017 Idaho Vandals football team represented the University of Idaho in the 2017 NCAA Division I FBS football season. The Vandals played their home games at the Kibbie Dome in Moscow, Idaho, and competed in the Sun Belt Conference. They were led by fifth-year head coach Paul Petrino. They finished the season 4–8, 3–5 in Sun Belt play to finish in a tie for eighth place.

The season marked the Vandals' final year in the Sun Belt and the FBS, as the team rejoined the Big Sky Conference and FCS in 2018. Idaho was kicked out of the Sun Belt and humiliatingly was forced to downgrade to FCS despite having been a member of the Pac 12's predecessor conference through the 1958 season.

== Schedule ==
Idaho announced its football schedule on March 1, 2017 and the regular season consisted of six home games and six away games, with four each in the Sun Belt Conference. The Vandals hosted Appalachian State, Coastal Carolina, Louisiana–Lafayette, and Louisiana–Monroe, and traveled to Georgia State, New Mexico State, South Alabama, and Troy

The Vandals hosted two of the four non-conference opponents, Sacramento State from the Big Sky Conference and UNLV from the Mountain West Conference, and traveled to Western Michigan from the Mid-American Conference and Missouri from the Southeastern Conference.

Date	Time	Opponent	Site	TV	Result	Attendance
August 31	6:00 p.m.	Sacramento State*	Kibbie Dome; Moscow, ID	ESPN3	W 28–6	10,526
September 9	4:00 p.m.	UNLV*	Kibbie Dome; Moscow, ID	ESPN3	L 16–44	10,156
September 16	4:00 p.m.	at Western Michigan*	Waldo Stadium; Kalamazoo, MI	ESPN3	L 28–37	25,732
September 23	11:00 a.m.	at South Alabama	Ladd–Peebles Stadium; Mobile, AL	ESPN3	W 29–23 ^{2OT}	12,603
October 7	2:00 p.m.	Louisiana–Lafayette^{†}	Kibbie Dome; Moscow, ID	ESPN3	L 16–21	14,198
October 14	2:00 p.m.	Appalachian State	Kibbie Dome; Moscow, ID	ESPN3	L 20–23	10,168
October 21	10:00 a.m.	at Missouri*	Faurot Field; Columbia, MO	SECN	L 21–68	47,648
October 28	2:00 p.m.	Louisiana–Monroe	Kibbie Dome; Moscow, ID	ESPN3	W 31–23	10,705
November 2	6:15 p.m.	at Troy	Veterans Memorial Stadium; Troy, AL	ESPNU	L 21–24	20,341
November 18	2:00 p.m.	Coastal Carolina	Kibbie Dome; Moscow, ID	ESPN3	L 7–13	7,444
November 25	1:00 p.m.	at New Mexico State	Aggie Memorial Stadium; Las Cruces, NM	ESPN3	L 10–17	21,894
December 2	11:00 a.m.	at Georgia State	Georgia State Stadium; Atlanta, GA	ESPN3	W 24–10	14,163
*Non-conference game; ^{†}Homecoming; All times are in Pacific time

Schedule source:

== Game summaries ==
=== Sacramento State ===
	1	2	3	4	Total
Hornets	0	6	0	0	6
Vandals	0	14	7	7	28

=== UNLV ===
	1	2	3	4	Total
Rebels	7	3	24	10	44
Vandals	0	3	7	6	16

=== At Western Michigan ===
	1	2	3	4	Total
Vandals	7	7	14	0	28
Broncos	3	3	13	18	37

=== At South Alabama ===
	1	2	3	4	OT	2OT	Total
Vandals	3	7	0	10	3	6	29
Jaguars	10	3	0	7	3	0	23

=== Louisiana–Lafayette ===
	1	2	3	4	Total
Ragin' Cajuns	7	7	7	0	21
Vandals	7	3	3	3	16

=== Appalachian State ===
	1	2	3	4	Total
Mountaineers	0	0	7	16	23
Vandals	0	17	3	0	20

=== At Missouri ===
	1	2	3	4	Total
Vandals	7	7	0	7	21
Tigers	34	17	14	3	68

=== Louisiana–Monroe ===
	1	2	3	4	Total
Warhawks	0	7	6	10	23
Vandals	14	14	3	0	31

=== At Troy ===
	1	2	3	4	Total
Vandals	7	0	0	14	21
Trojans	0	10	7	7	24

=== Coastal Carolina ===
	1	2	3	4	Total
Chanticleers	0	10	0	3	13
Vandals	7	0	0	0	7

=== At New Mexico State ===
	1	2	3	4	Total
Vandals	0	7	3	0	10
Aggies	14	0	0	3	17

=== At Georgia State ===
	1	2	3	4	Total
Vandals	7	7	3	7	24
Panthers	7	3	0	0	10
