= 2017 Georgia Southern Eagles football team =

American college football season

2017 Georgia Southern Eagles football
- Conference: Sun Belt Conference
- Record: 2–10 (2–6 Sun Belt)
- Head coach: Tyson Summers (2nd season; first 6 games); Chad Lunsford (interim; last 6 games)
- Offensive coordinator: Bryan Cook (1st season)
- Offensive scheme: Spread option
- Defensive coordinator: Lorenzo Costantini (2nd season)
- Base defense: 4–3
- Home stadium: Paulson Stadium

2017 Sun Belt Conference football standings
	Conf.			Overall
Team	W		L	W		L
Troy +	7	–	1	11	–	2
Appalachian State +	7	–	1	9	–	4
Arkansas State	6	–	2	7	–	5
Georgia State	5	–	3	7	–	5
New Mexico State	4	–	4	7	–	6
Louisiana	4	–	4	5	–	7
Louisiana–Monroe	4	–	4	4	–	8
Idaho	3	–	5	4	–	8
South Alabama	3	–	5	4	–	8
Coastal Carolina *	2	–	6	3	–	9
Georgia Southern	2	–	6	2	–	10
Texas State	1	–	7	2	–	10
+ – Conference co-champions; * – Ineligible for postseason play due to FCS-to-FBS transition rules

The 2017 Georgia Southern Eagles football team represented Georgia Southern University in the 2017 NCAA Division I FBS football season. The Eagles played their home games at Paulson Stadium in Statesboro, Georgia, and competed in the Sun Belt Conference. They were led by coach Chad Lunsford following the mid-season firing of second-year head coach Tyson Summers. They finished the season 2–10, 2–6 in Sun Belt play to finish in a tie for tenth place.

Following the season, interim head coach Chad Lunsford was promoted to head coach.

== Schedule ==
Georgia Southern announced its 2017 football schedule on March 1, 2017. The 2016 schedule consisted of five home and seven away games in the regular season. The Eagles hosted Sun Belt opponents Arkansas State, New Mexico State, Georgia State, and South Alabama, and traveled to Troy, Appalachian State, Louisiana-Lafayette, and Coastal Carolina.

The team played four non–conference games, one home game against New Hampshire from the Colonial Athletic Association (CAA), and traveled to three road games against Auburn from the Southeastern Conference (SEC), Indiana from the Big Ten Conference (B1G) and UMass (Independent). Due to the then-impending impact of Hurricane Irma on southern Georgia, the home game against New Hampshire was relocated to Legion Field in Birmingham, Alabama.

Date	Time	Opponent	Site	TV	Result	Attendance
September 2	7:30 p.m.	at No. 12 Auburn*	Jordan–Hare Stadium; Auburn, AL	SECN	L 7–41	87,451
September 9	4:00 p.m.	No. 12 (FCS) New Hampshire*	Legion Field; Birmingham, AL	ESPN3	L 12–22	3,387
September 23	3:30 p.m.	at Indiana*	Memorial Stadium; Bloomington, IN	BTN	L 17–52	42,886
October 4	8:00 p.m.	Arkansas State	Paulson Stadium; Statesboro, GA	ESPN2	L 25–43	13,781
October 14	6:00 p.m.	New Mexico State^{†}	Paulson Stadium; Statesboro, GA	ESPN3	L 27–35	16,278
October 21	3:30 p.m.	at UMass*	Warren McGuirk Alumni Stadium; Hadley, MA	ELVN	L 20–55	10,690
October 28	3:30 p.m.	at Troy	Veterans Memorial Stadium; Troy, AL	ESPN3	L 16–38	23,846
November 4	3:00 p.m.	Georgia State	Paulson Stadium; Statesboro, GA (rivalry)	ESPN3	L 17–21	18,722
November 9	7:30 p.m.	at Appalachian State	Kidd Brewer Stadium; Boone, NC (rivalry)	ESPNU	L 6–27	23,110
November 18	3:00 p.m.	South Alabama	Paulson Stadium; Statesboro, GA	ESPN3	W 52–0	12,250
November 25	5:00 p.m.	at Louisiana–Lafayette	Cajun Field; Lafayette, LA	ESPN3	W 34–24	12,993
December 2	1:00 p.m.	at Coastal Carolina	Brooks Stadium; Conway, SC	ESPN3	L 17–28	15,951
*Non-conference game; ^{†}Homecoming; Rankings from AP Poll (FBS) or STATS Poll (FCS) released prior to game; All times are in Eastern time

== Game summaries ==
=== At Auburn ===
Georgia Southern Eagles at No. 12 Auburn Tigers – Game summary

Quarter	1	2	3	4	Total
Eagles	7	0	0	0	7
No. 12 Tigers	10	14	10	7	41

at Jordan–Hare Stadium • Auburn, Alabama

- Date: September 2, 2017
- Game time: 7:39 p.m. EST
- Game weather: Temperature: 85° • Wind: NW4 • Weather: Sunny
- Game attendance: 87,451
- Referee: Ken Williamson
- TV announcers (SEC Network): Tom Hart (play-by-play), Jordan Rodgers (analyst), Cole Cubelic (sideline reporter)

Game information

First Quarter

- AUB – Daniel Carlson 50 yd field goal, 12:01 (AUB 3–0)
- AUB – Kerryon Johnson 60 yd run (Daniel Carlson kick), 5:11 (AUB 10–0)
- GASO – Tomarcio Reese 22 yd fumble return (Tyler Bass kick), 0:36 (AUB 10–7)

Second Quarter

- AUB – Jarrett Stidham 14 yd run (Daniel Carlson kick), 8:36 (AUB 17–7)
- AUB – Kam Martin 36 yd run (Daniel Carlson kick), 4:52 (AUB 24–7)

Third Quarter

- AUB – Ryan Davis 19 yd pass from Jarrett Stidham (Daniel Carlson kick), 10:56 (AUB 31–7)
- AUB – Daniel Carlson 37 yd field goal, 5:20 (AUB 34–7)

Fourth Quarter

- AUB – Will Hastings 19 yd pass from Jarrett Stidham (Daniel Carlson kick), 9:18 (AUB 41–7)

Top Passers

- GASO − Shai Werts - 4–8, 8 yds, 1 INT
- AUB – Jarrett Stidham - 14–24, 185 yds, 2 TD, 1 INT

Top Rushers

- GASO – L.A. Ramsby - 11 carries, 33 yds
- AUB – Kerryon Johnson - 16 carries, 136 yds, 1 TD

Top Receivers

- GASO – Obe Fortune - 1 reception, 7 yds
- AUB – Will Hastings - 4 receptions, 68 yds, 1 TD

=== New Hampshire ===
	1	2	3	4	Total
No. 12 (FCS) Wildcats	15	7	0	0	22
Eagles	0	0	5	7	12

=== At Indiana ===
Georgia Southern Eagles (0–2) vs Indiana Hoosiers (1–1) – Game summary

Quarter	1	2	3	4	Total
Eagles	0	7	10	0	17
Hoosiers	21	10	14	7	52

at Memorial Stadium • Bloomington, Indiana

- Date: September 23, 2017
- Game time: 3:40 p.m.
- Game weather: Sunny, 90 °F (32 °C)
- Game attendance: 42,886
- Referee: Don Willard
- TV announcers (BTN): Lisa Byington (play-by-play), Jeremy Leman (analyst)

Game information

First Quarter

- (8:54) IU – Morgan Ellison 2-yard run, Griffin Oakes kick (Drive: 10 plays, 73 yards, 2:25; Indiana 7–0)
- (6:27) IU – J-Shun Harris 70-yard punt return, Griffin Oakes kick (Drive: 3 plays, 5 yards, 2:27; Indiana 14–0)
- (4:56) IU – Simmie Cobbs 0-yard fumble recovery, Griffin Oakes kick (Drive: 5 plays, 46 yards, 0:56; Indiana 21–0)

Second Quarter

- (14:14) IU – Griffin Oakes 27-yard field goal (Drive: 5 plays, 43 yards, 2:25; Indiana 24–0)
- (11:49) IU – Morgan Ellison 1-yard run, Griffin Oakes kick (Drive: 7 plays, 36 yards, 1:36; Indiana 31–0)
- (2:51) GASO – Ellis Richardson 23-yard pass from Shai Werts, Tyler Bass kick (Drive: 8 plays, 77 yards, 4:20; Indiana 31–7)

Third Quarter

- (14:21) IU – Ian Thomas 71-yard pass from Richard Lagow, Griffin Oakes kick (Drive: 3 plays, 75 yards, 0:39; Indiana 38–7)
- (10:42) IU – Devonte Williams 42-yard pass from Peyton Ramsey, Griffin Oakes kick (Drive: 5 plays, 80 yards, 1:24; Indiana 45–7)
- (9:38) GASO – D'Ondre Glenn 63-yard pass from Shai Werts, Tyler Bass kick (Drive: 3 plays, 75 yards, 1:04; Indiana 45–14)
- (3:46) GASO – Tyler Bass 32-yard field goal (Drive: 10 plays, 38 yards, 4:40; Indiana 45–17)

Fourth Quarter

- (2:19) IU – Andre Brown 22-yard fumble return, Griffin Oakes kick (Drive: 1 play, 4 yards, 0:10; Indiana 52–17)

Statistics	GASO	IU
First downs	15	20
Total yards	375	467
Rushes/yards	54–242	47–282
Passing yards	133	185
Passing: Comp–Att–Int	7–16–0	11–22–0
Time of possession	34:11	25:49

Team	Category	Player	Statistics
Georgia Southern	Passing	Shai Werts	6/14, 129 yards, 2 TD
Georgia Southern	Rushing	L. A. Ramsby	18 carries, 108 yards
Georgia Southern	Receiving	D'Ondre Glenn	3 receptions, 98 yards, TD
Indiana	Passing	Richard Lagow	8/13, 130 yards, TD
Indiana	Rushing	Morgan Ellison	25 carries, 186 yards, 2 TD
Indiana	Receiving	Ian Thomas	2 receptions, 79 yards, TD

=== Arkansas State ===
	1	2	3	4	Total
Red Wolves	3	19	14	7	43
Eagles	0	17	0	8	25

=== New Mexico State ===
	1	2	3	4	Total
Aggies	14	7	0	14	35
Eagles	14	10	3	0	27

=== At UMass ===
	1	2	3	4	Total
Eagles	7	10	3	0	20
Minutemen	28	20	0	7	55

Tyson Summers was fired as head coach the day after the game. Assistant head coach Chad Lunsford was named interim coach for the remainder of the season.

=== At Troy ===
	1	2	3	4	Total
Eagles	7	3	0	6	16
Trojans	14	14	3	7	38

=== Georgia State ===
	1	2	3	4	Total
Panthers	7	0	7	7	21
Eagles	7	3	7	0	17

=== At Appalachian State ===
	1	2	3	4	Total
Eagles	3	0	3	0	6
Mountaineers	0	10	3	14	27

=== South Alabama ===
	1	2	3	4	Total
Jaguars	0	0	0	0	0
Eagles	21	10	14	7	52

=== At Louisiana–Lafayette ===
	1	2	3	4	Total
Eagles	14	3	10	7	34
Ragin' Cajuns	0	7	3	14	24

=== At Coastal Carolina ===
	1	2	3	4	Total
Eagles	3	7	7	0	17
Chanticleers	7	7	14	0	28
