= 2017 Arkansas State Red Wolves football team =

American college football season

2017 Arkansas State Red Wolves football

Camellia Bowl, L 30–35 vs. Middle Tennessee
- Conference: Sun Belt Conference
- Record: 7–5 (6–2 Sun Belt)
- Head coach: Blake Anderson (4th season)
- Offensive coordinator: Buster Faulkner (2nd season)
- Offensive scheme: Spread
- Defensive coordinator: Joe Cauthen (4th season)
- Base defense: 4–2–5
- Home stadium: Centennial Bank Stadium

2017 Sun Belt Conference football standings
	Conf.			Overall
Team	W		L	W		L
Troy +	7	–	1	11	–	2
Appalachian State +	7	–	1	9	–	4
Arkansas State	6	–	2	7	–	5
Georgia State	5	–	3	7	–	5
New Mexico State	4	–	4	7	–	6
Louisiana	4	–	4	5	–	7
Louisiana–Monroe	4	–	4	4	–	8
Idaho	3	–	5	4	–	8
South Alabama	3	–	5	4	–	8
Coastal Carolina *	2	–	6	3	–	9
Georgia Southern	2	–	6	2	–	10
Texas State	1	–	7	2	–	10
+ – Conference co-champions; * – Ineligible for postseason play due to FCS-to-FBS transition rules

The 2017 Arkansas State Red Wolves football team represented Arkansas State University in the 2017 NCAA Division I FBS football season. The Red Wolves played their home games at Centennial Bank Stadium in Jonesboro, Arkansas, and competed in the Sun Belt Conference. They were led by fourth-year head coach Blake Anderson. They finished the season 7–5, 6–2 in Sun Belt play to finish in third place. They received a bid to the Camellia Bowl where they lost to Middle Tennessee.

== Schedule ==
Arkansas State announced its 2017 football schedule on March 1, 2017. The 2017 schedule consisted of six home and away games in the regular season. The Red Wolves hosted Sun Belt foes Coastal Carolina, Louisiana–Lafayette, Texas State, and Troy, and traveled to Georgia Southern, Louisiana–Monroe, New Mexico State, and South Alabama

The Red Wolves hosted two of the four non-conference opponents, Arkansas–Pine Bluff from the Southwestern Athletic Conference and Miami (FL) from the Atlantic Coast Conference, and traveled to Nebraska from the Big Ten Conference and SMU from the American Athletic Conference.

Date	Time	Opponent	Site	TV	Result	Attendance
September 2	7:00 p.m.	at Nebraska*	Memorial Stadium; Lincoln, NE	BTN	L 36–43	90,171
September 9^{[a]}	2:30 p.m.	No. 16 Miami (FL)*	Centennial Bank Stadium		Canceled^{[a]}	
September 16	6:00 p.m.	Arkansas–Pine Bluff*	Centennial Bank Stadium; Jonesboro, AR	ESPN3	W 48–3	24,371
September 23	6:00 p.m.	at SMU*	Gerald J. Ford Stadium; Dallas, TX	ESPN3	L 21–44	23,672
October 4	7:00 p.m.	at Georgia Southern	Paulson Stadium; Statesboro, GA	ESPN2	W 43–25	13,781
October 14	6:00 p.m.	Coastal Carolina^{†}	Centennial Bank Stadium; Jonesboro, AR	ESPN3	W 51–17	25,916
October 19	6:30 p.m.	Louisiana–Lafayette	Centennial Bank Stadium; Jonesboro, AR	ESPNU	W 47–3	21,943
October 28	3:00 p.m.	at New Mexico State	Aggie Memorial Stadium; Las Cruces, NM	ALT	W 37–21	10,041
November 11	4:00 p.m.	at South Alabama	Ladd–Peebles Stadium; Mobile, AL	ESPN3	L 19–24	17,640
November 18	2:00 p.m.	Texas State	Centennial Bank Stadium; Jonesboro, AR	ESPN3	W 30–12	19,846
November 25	2:00 p.m.	at Louisiana–Monroe	Malone Stadium; Monroe, LA	ESPN3	W 67–50	8,245
December 2	6:30 p.m.	Troy	Centennial Bank Stadium; Jonesboro, AR	ESPN2	L 25–32	27,462
December 16	7:00 p.m.	vs. Middle Tennessee*	Cramton Bowl; Montgomery, AL (Camellia Bowl)	ESPN	L 30–35	20,612
*Non-conference game; ^{†}Homecoming; Rankings from AP Poll released prior to game; All times are in Central time

^{^[a]}The game between Arkansas State and Miami was canceled in the wake of Hurricane Irma due to travel concerns for the Hurricanes.
Schedule source:

== Game summaries ==
=== At Nebraska ===
	1	2	3	4	Total
Red Wolves	14	12	0	10	36
Cornhuskers	17	10	7	9	43

=== Arkansas–Pine Bluff ===
	1	2	3	4	Total
Golden Lions	0	3	0	0	3
Red Wolves	13	7	21	7	48

=== At SMU ===
	1	2	3	4	Total
Red Wolves	14	0	0	7	21
Mustangs	10	20	7	7	44

=== At Georgia Southern ===
	1	2	3	4	Total
Red Wolves	3	19	14	7	43
Eagles	0	17	0	8	25

=== Coastal Carolina ===
	1	2	3	4	Total
Chanticleers	0	7	0	10	17
Red Wolves	7	10	17	17	51

=== Louisiana–Lafayette ===
	1	2	3	4	Total
Ragin' Cajuns	3	0	0	0	3
Red Wolves	14	20	3	10	47

=== At New Mexico State ===
	1	2	3	4	Total
Red Wolves	7	0	10	20	37
Aggies	0	14	0	7	21

=== At South Alabama ===
	1	2	3	4	Total
Red Wolves	0	6	6	7	19
Jaguars	10	0	7	7	24

=== Texas State ===
	1	2	3	4	Total
Bobcats	6	0	6	0	12
Red Wolves	16	0	14	0	30

=== At Louisiana–Monroe ===
	1	2	3	4	Total
Red Wolves	7	21	21	18	67
Warhawks	14	7	14	15	50

=== Troy ===
	1	2	3	4	Total
Trojans	0	7	10	15	32
Red Wolves	0	10	3	12	25

=== vs Middle Tennessee–Camellia Bowl ===
	1	2	3	4	Total
Blue Raiders	7	14	7	7	35
Red Wolves	3	7	7	13	30
