= 2017 Louisiana–Monroe Warhawks football team =

American college football season

2017 Louisiana–Monroe Warhawks football
- Conference: Sun Belt Conference
- Record: 4–8 (4–4 Sun Belt)
- Head coach: Matt Viator (2nd season)
- Offensive coordinator: Matt Kubik (2nd season)
- Offensive scheme: Multiple
- Defensive coordinator: Mike Collins (2nd season)
- Base defense: 4–2–5
- Home stadium: Malone Stadium

2017 Sun Belt Conference football standings
	Conf.			Overall
Team	W		L	W		L
Troy +	7	–	1	11	–	2
Appalachian State +	7	–	1	9	–	4
Arkansas State	6	–	2	7	–	5
Georgia State	5	–	3	7	–	5
New Mexico State	4	–	4	7	–	6
Louisiana	4	–	4	5	–	7
Louisiana–Monroe	4	–	4	4	–	8
Idaho	3	–	5	4	–	8
South Alabama	3	–	5	4	–	8
Coastal Carolina *	2	–	6	3	–	9
Georgia Southern	2	–	6	2	–	10
Texas State	1	–	7	2	–	10
+ – Conference co-champions; * – Ineligible for postseason play due to FCS-to-FBS transition rules

The 2017 Louisiana–Monroe Warhawks football team represented the University of Louisiana at Monroe in the 2017 NCAA Division I FBS football season. The Warhawks played their home games at Malone Stadium in Monroe, Louisiana, and competed in the Sun Belt Conference. They were led by second-year head coach Matt Viator. They finished the season 4–8, 4–4 in Sun Belt play to finish in a three-way tie for fifth place.

== Schedule ==
Louisiana–Monroe announced its 2017 football schedule on March 1, 2017. The 2017 schedule consisted of five home and seven away games in the regular season. The Warhawks hosted Sun Belt foes Appalachian State, Arkansas State, Coastal Carolina, and Georgia State, and traveled to Idaho, Louisiana-Lafayette, Texas State, and South Alabama

The Warhawks hosted one of the four non-conference opponents, Southern Miss from Conference USA, and traveled to Auburn from the Southeastern Conference, Florida State from the Atlantic Coast Conference and Memphis from the American Athletic Conference.

Date	Time	Opponent	Site	TV	Result	Attendance
August 31	7:00 p.m.	at Memphis*	Liberty Bowl Memorial Stadium; Memphis, TN	CBSSN	L 29–37	10,263
September 16	6:00 p.m.	Southern Miss*	Malone Stadium; Monroe, LA	ESPN3	L 17–28	11,061
September 23	4:00 p.m.	at Louisiana–Lafayette	Cajun Field; Lafayette, LA (Battle on the Bayou)	ESPN3	W 56–50 ^{2OT}	18,318
September 30	6:00 p.m.	Coastal Carolina	Malone Stadium; Monroe, LA	ESPN3	W 51–43	10,359
October 7	2:00 p.m.	at Texas State	Bobcat Stadium; San Marcos, TX	ESPN3	W 45–27	12,238
October 14	4:00 p.m.	Georgia State^{†}	Malone Stadium; Monroe, LA	ESPN3	L 37–47	12,578
October 21	4:00 p.m.	at South Alabama	Ladd–Peebles Stadium; Mobile, AL	ESPN3	L 23–33	16,495
October 28	4:00 p.m.	at Idaho	Kibbie Dome; Moscow, ID	ESPN3	L 23–31	10,705
November 4	2:00 p.m.	Appalachian State	Malone Stadium; Monroe, LA	ESPN3	W 52–45	7,397
November 18	11:00 a.m.	at No. 6 Auburn*	Jordan–Hare Stadium; Auburn, AL	ESPN2	L 14–42	82,113
November 25	2:00 p.m.	Arkansas State	Malone Stadium; Monroe, LA	ESPN3	L 50–67	8,245
December 2^{[a]}	11:00 a.m.	at Florida State*	Doak Campbell Stadium; Tallahassee, FL	ACCN	L 10–42	58,780
*Non-conference game; ^{†}Homecoming; Rankings from AP Poll released prior to game; All times are in Central time

^{^[a]}The game between Florida State and Louisiana-Monroe set for September 9 was originally canceled due to inclement weather from Hurricane Irma, but the two schools agreed on November 7 to reschedule the game for December 2.
Schedule source:

== Game summaries ==
=== At Memphis ===
	1	2	3	4	Total
Warhawks	7	0	7	15	29
Tigers	7	13	17	0	37

=== Southern Miss ===
	1	2	3	4	Total
Golden Eagles	7	14	7	0	28
Warhawks	0	10	7	0	17

=== At Louisiana–Lafayette ===
	1	2	3	4	OT	2OT	Total
Warhawks	9	14	7	13	7	6	56
Ragin' Cajuns	0	13	9	21	7	0	50

=== Coastal Carolina ===
	1	2	3	4	Total
Chanticleers	15	7	8	13	43
Warhawks	10	21	14	6	51

=== At Texas State ===
	1	2	3	4	Total
Warhawks	19	7	9	10	45
Bobcats	20	0	0	7	27

=== Georgia State ===
	1	2	3	4	Total
Panthers	13	13	14	7	47
Warhawks	10	0	14	13	37

=== At South Alabama ===
	1	2	3	4	Total
Warhawks	7	13	3	0	23
Jaguars	14	10	6	3	33

=== At Idaho ===
	1	2	3	4	Total
Warhawks	0	7	6	10	23
Vandals	14	14	3	0	31

=== Appalachian State ===
	1	2	3	4	Total
Mountaineers	0	24	14	7	45
Warhawks	14	14	7	17	52

=== At Auburn ===
	1	2	3	4	Total
Warhawks	7	0	0	7	14
No. 6 Tigers	7	7	14	14	42

=== Arkansas State ===
	1	2	3	4	Total
Red Wolves	7	21	21	18	67
Warhawks	14	7	14	15	50

=== At Florida State ===
	1	2	3	4	Total
Warhawks	0	0	10	0	10
Seminoles	7	7	14	14	42
