= 2017 Troy Trojans football team =

American college football season

2017 Troy Trojans football

Sun Belt co-champion New Orleans Bowl champion

New Orleans Bowl, W 50–30 vs. North Texas
- Conference: Sun Belt Conference
- Record: 11–2 (7–1 Sun Belt)
- Head coach: Neal Brown (3rd season)
- Co-offensive coordinators: Kenny Edenfield (8th season); Matt Moore (2nd season)
- Offensive scheme: Spread
- Defensive coordinator: Vic Koenning (5th season)
- Base defense: 3–3–5
- Home stadium: Veterans Memorial Stadium

2017 Sun Belt Conference football standings
	Conf.			Overall
Team	W		L	W		L
Troy +	7	–	1	11	–	2
Appalachian State +	7	–	1	9	–	4
Arkansas State	6	–	2	7	–	5
Georgia State	5	–	3	7	–	5
New Mexico State	4	–	4	7	–	6
Louisiana	4	–	4	5	–	7
Louisiana–Monroe	4	–	4	4	–	8
Idaho	3	–	5	4	–	8
South Alabama	3	–	5	4	–	8
Coastal Carolina *	2	–	6	3	–	9
Georgia Southern	2	–	6	2	–	10
Texas State	1	–	7	2	–	10
+ – Conference co-champions; * – Ineligible for postseason play due to FCS-to-FBS transition rules

The 2017 Troy Trojans football team represented Troy University in the 2017 NCAA Division I FBS football season. The Trojans played their home games at Veterans Memorial Stadium in Troy, Alabama, and competed in the Sun Belt Conference. They were led by third-year head coach Neal Brown. They finished the season 11–2, 7–1 in Sun Belt play to finish in a tie for the Sun Belt championship. They received an invitation to the New Orleans Bowl where they defeated North Texas.

== Schedule ==
Troy announced its 2017 football schedule on March 1, 2017. The 2017 schedule consisted of six home and away games in the regular season. The Trojans hosted Sun Belt foes Georgia Southern, Idaho, South Alabama, and Texas State, and traveled to Arkansas State, Coastal Carolina, Georgia State, and New Mexico State.

The Trojans hosted two of their four non-conference opponents, Akron from the Mid-American Conference and Alabama State from the Southwestern Athletic Conference, and will travel to Boise State from the Mountain West Conference and LSU from the Southeastern Conference.

Date	Time	Opponent	Site	TV	Result	Attendance
September 2	2:45 p.m.	at Boise State*	Albertsons Stadium; Boise, ID	ESPNU	L 13–24	31,581
September 9	5:00 p.m.	Alabama State*	Veterans Memorial Stadium; Troy, AL	ESPN3	W 34–7	29,278
September 16	7:00 p.m.	at New Mexico State	Aggie Memorial Stadium; Las Cruces, NM	ESPN3	W 27–24	15,446
September 23	5:00 p.m.	Akron*	Veterans Memorial Stadium; Troy, AL	ESPN3	W 22–17	27,324
September 30	6:00 p.m.	at No. 25 LSU*	Tiger Stadium; Baton Rouge, LA	ESPNU	W 24–21	99,879
October 11	7:00 p.m.	South Alabama	Veterans Memorial Stadium; Troy, AL (rivalry)	ESPN2	L 8–19	25,211
October 21	1:00 p.m.	at Georgia State	Georgia State Stadium; Atlanta, GA	ESPN3	W 34–10	15,388
October 28	2:30 p.m.	Georgia Southern^{†}	Veterans Memorial Stadium; Troy, AL	ESPN3	W 38–16	23,846
November 2	8:15 p.m.	Idaho	Veterans Memorial Stadium; Troy, AL	ESPNU	W 24–21	20,341
November 11	3:30 p.m.	at Coastal Carolina	Brooks Stadium; Conway, SC	ESPN3	W 42–17	15,545
November 24	3:00 p.m.	Texas State	Veterans Memorial Stadium; Troy, AL	ESPN3	W 62–9	20,737
December 2	6:30 p.m.	at Arkansas State	Centennial Bank Stadium; Jonesboro, AR	ESPN2	W 32–25	27,462
December 16	12:00 p.m.	vs. North Texas*	Mercedes-Benz Superdome; New Orleans, LA (New Orleans Bowl)	ESPN	W 50–30	24,904
*Non-conference game; ^{†}Homecoming; Rankings from AP Poll released prior to the game; All times are in Central time

== Game summaries ==
=== At Boise State ===
	1	2	3	4	Total
Trojans	3	7	0	3	13
Broncos	7	10	0	7	24

=== Alabama State ===
	1	2	3	4	Total
Hornets	7	0	0	0	7
Trojans	7	13	7	7	34

=== At New Mexico State ===
	1	2	3	4	Total
Trojans	13	0	14	0	27
Aggies	3	0	13	8	24

=== Akron ===
	1	2	3	4	Total
Zips	3	0	7	7	17
Trojans	7	9	0	6	22

=== At LSU ===
	1	2	3	4	Total
Trojans	7	3	7	7	24
No. 25 Tigers	0	0	7	14	21

Troy beat LSU securing their first win against an AP TOP 25 team.

=== South Alabama ===
	1	2	3	4	Total
Jaguars	7	2	7	3	19
Trojans	0	0	0	8	8

=== At Georgia State ===
	1	2	3	4	Total
Trojans	7	14	10	3	34
Panthers	3	0	0	7	10

=== Georgia Southern ===
	1	2	3	4	Total
Eagles	7	3	0	6	16
Trojans	14	14	3	7	38

=== Idaho ===
	1	2	3	4	Total
Vandals	7	0	0	14	21
Trojans	0	10	7	7	24

=== At Coastal Carolina ===
	1	2	3	4	Total
Trojans	14	14	7	7	42
Chanticleers	10	0	7	0	17

=== Texas State ===
	1	2	3	4	Total
Bobcats	0	0	6	3	9
Trojans	17	24	14	7	62

=== At Arkansas State ===
	1	2	3	4	Total
Trojans	0	7	10	15	32
Red Wolves	0	10	3	12	25

=== vs North Texas–New Orleans Bowl ===
	1	2	3	4	Total
Trojans	15	7	21	7	50
Mean Green	7	13	3	7	30
