= Terrell Williams =

American football player and coach (born 1974)

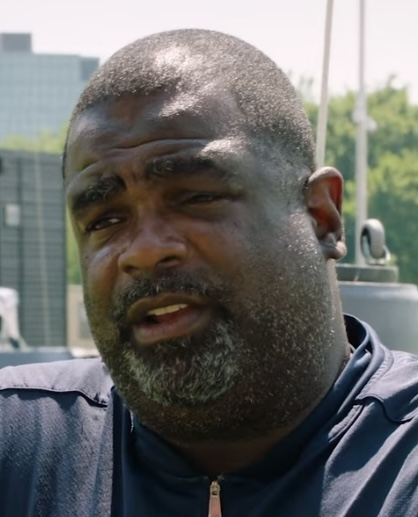
- Williams in 2021

New England Patriots
- Title: Assistant head coach

Personal information
- Born: June 19, 1974 (age 52); Los Angeles, California, U.S.

Career information
- Position: Nose guard
- College: East Carolina

Career history
- Fort Scott (1998) Defensive line coach; North Carolina A&T (1999–2001) Defensive line coach; Youngstown State (2002–2003) Defensive line coach; Akron (2004–2005) Defensive line coach; Purdue (2006–2009) Defensive line coach; Texas A&M (2010–2011) Defensive line coach; Oakland Raiders (2012–2014) Defensive line coach; Miami Dolphins (2015–2017) Defensive line coach; Tennessee Titans (2018–2022) Defensive line coach; Tennessee Titans (2023) Assistant head coach/defensive line coach; Detroit Lions (2024) Defensive line coach/run game coordinator; New England Patriots (2025) Defensive coordinator; New England Patriots (2026–present) Assistant head coach
- Coaching profile at Pro Football Reference

Terrell Williams (born June 19, 1974) is an American professional football coach and former defensive tackle who is the assistant head coach of the New England Patriots of the National Football League (NFL). He has previously worked for the Oakland Raiders, Tennessee Titans, and Detroit Lions in various coaching capacities.

== College career ==
Williams is originally from Los Angeles. He played nose guard at East Carolina and helped the Pirates to a Liberty Bowl victory over Stanford in 1995. He received a bachelor's degree in communications with a minor in history. From 1998 until 2011, Williams coached at the collegiate level at six different institutions – all as a defensive line coach. He started his career at Fort Scott (Kansas) Community College, followed by two years at North Carolina A&T, two years at Youngstown State, two years at Akron, four years at Purdue, and two years at Texas A&M.

== Professional career ==
During his college coaching tenure, Williams had three summer internships in the NFL. In the summer of 1999, he assisted the Jacksonville Jaguars with the defensive line. Williams had similar roles with the Seattle Seahawks in 2007 and with the Dallas Cowboys in 2008.

=== Oakland Raiders ===
In 2012, Williams accepted his first full time position at the professional level when he joined head coach Dennis Allen as defensive line coach with the Oakland Raiders. In 2014, Williams' unit helped the defense rank eighth in the NFL in fewest rushing yards allowed per play and finished second in the NFL in tackles recorded at or behind the line of scrimmage.

=== Miami Dolphins ===
In 2015, Williams joined the Miami Dolphins as defensive line coach under head coach Joe Philbin. He was to serve in the same role with the Florida Gators but left on National Signing Day. Williams continued his role with the Dolphins in 2016 and 2017 under head coach Adam Gase. In 2016, Williams helped the Dolphins to their most successful season in eight years, winning 10 games and earning their first playoff berth since 2008. Defensive linemen Cameron Wake and Ndamukong Suh flourished under Williams's three-year stint with the Dolphins. Wake tallied 29 sacks, which was the eighth-highest total by a player in that period, while Ndamukong Suh totaled the eighth-highest number of sacks (15.5) among defensive tackles. Wake's nine forced fumbles tied for fifth in the NFL over the same span.

=== Tennessee Titans ===
In 2018, Williams joined head coach Mike Vrabel with the Tennessee Titans. In his first year, the Titans defense ranked eighth overall (333.4 yards per game), third in points allowed (18.9 per game), 10th on third down (36.6 percent) and second in the red zone (44.7 touchdown percentage). In 2019, Williams helped the Titans to the AFC championship game.

=== Detroit Lions ===
On February 21, 2024, Williams was hired by the Detroit Lions as their defensive running game coordinator and defensive line coach under head coach Dan Campbell.

=== New England Patriots ===
On January 22, 2025, Williams was hired by the New England Patriots to rejoin Mike Vrabel as their defensive coordinator. He missed many early offseason activities due to an unspecified "scary" medical condition. On August 4, Williams collapsed during a training camp practice and was treated for dehydration. On September 10, Vrabel announced that Williams would be stepping away from the team due to health reasons unrelated to the August incident, and that inside linebackers coach Zak Kuhr would take over defensive play calling duties for the week. On September 26, Vrabel announced that Williams had been diagnosed with prostate cancer and that Kuhr would continue as defensive play caller while Williams undergoes treatment. Williams returned to the team during the second half of the season, but Kuhr continued calling plays. After the 2025 season, in which the Patriots went 14–3, the Patriots reached Super Bowl LX (losing 29–13); Williams traveled with the team to Santa Clara. On February 12, 2026, the Patriots announced that Williams would move to an unspecified "high-ranking role" in the organization; on March 16, the Patriots announced Kuhr would become full-time defensive coordinator, and Williams would be assistant head coach.

== Personal life ==
Williams and his wife, Tifini, have two sons: Tahj and Tyson. Tyson died at the age of 4 in 2012 from a sudden and unexpected illness.

On September 26, 2025, it was announced that Williams was diagnosed with prostate cancer. In January 2026 his doctors announced he was "cancer-free".
