= Colby Gossett =

American football player (born 1995)

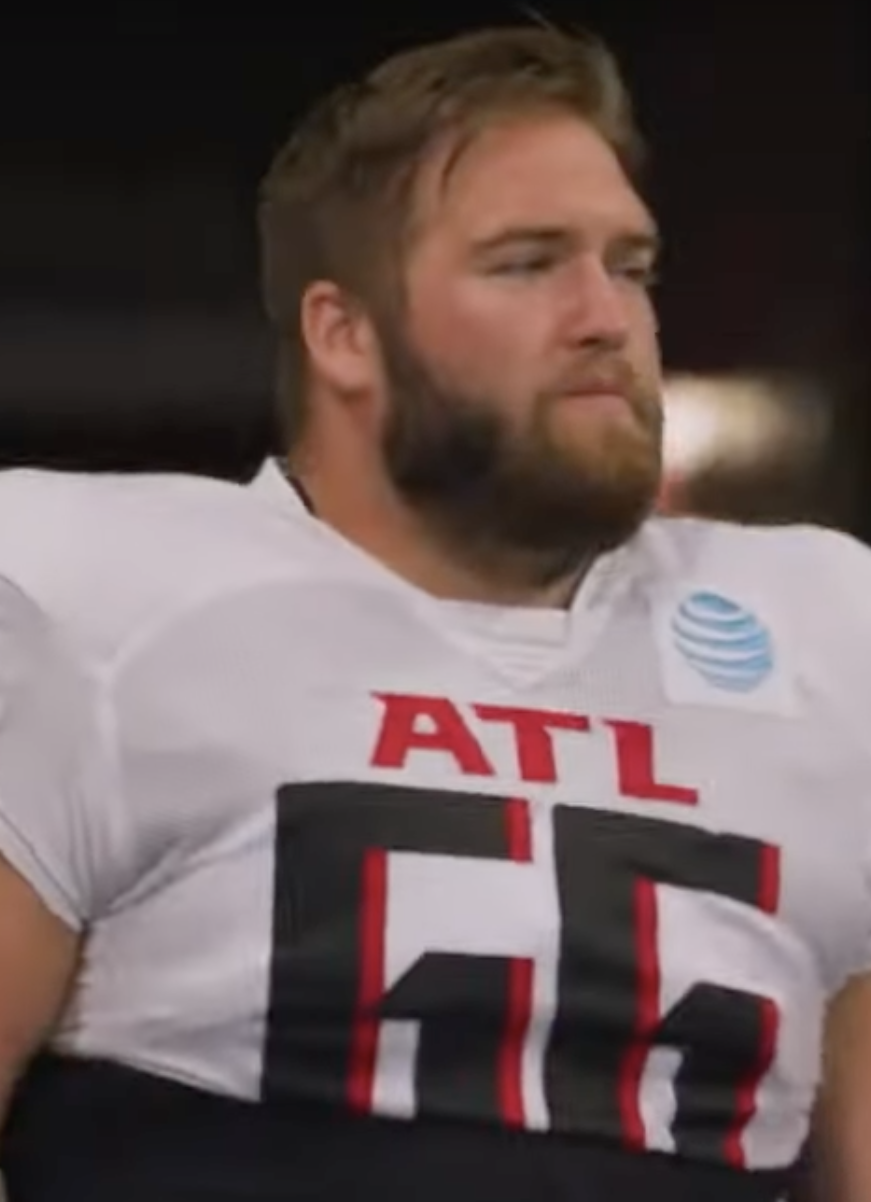
- Gossett with the Atlanta Falcons in 2022

Profile
- Position: Guard

Personal information
- Born: June 23, 1995 (age 31); Cumming, Georgia, U.S.
- Listed height: 6 ft 5 in (1.96 m)
- Listed weight: 311 lb (141 kg)

Career information
- High school: North Forsyth (Cumming)
- College: Appalachian State (2013–2017)
- NFL draft: 2018: 6th round, 213th overall pick

Career history
- Minnesota Vikings (2018)*; Arizona Cardinals (2018); New England Patriots (2019)*; Cleveland Browns (2019–2021); Atlanta Falcons (2021–2022); Cleveland Browns (2023)*; New Orleans Saints (2023)*
- * Offseason or practice squad member only

Awards and highlights
- 2× First-team All-Sun Belt (2016, 2017)

Career NFL statistics
- Games played: 36
- Games started: 9
- Fumble recoveries: 1
- Stats at Pro Football Reference

Colby Gossett (born June 23, 1995) is an American professional football guard. He played college football at Appalachian State. Gossett was named to the first-team All-Sun Belt Conference as a junior and senior.

== Professional career ==
Pre-draft measurables
Height	Weight	Arm length	Hand span	40-yard dash	10-yard split	20-yard split	20-yard shuttle	Three-cone drill	Vertical jump	Broad jump	Bench press
6 ft 4 7/8 in (1.95 m)	311 lb (141 kg)	33 7/8 in (0.86 m)	10 in (0.25 m)	5.20 s	1.85 s	3.07 s	4.83 s	7.60 s	25.0 in (0.64 m)	8 ft 7 in (2.62 m)	32 reps
All values from NFL Combine

=== Minnesota Vikings ===
Gossett was drafted by the Minnesota Vikings in the sixth round (213th overall) of the 2018 NFL draft. On May 3, 2018, he signed his rookie contract. He was waived on September 1, 2018, and was signed to the practice squad the next day.

=== Arizona Cardinals ===
On October 30, 2018, Gossett was signed by the Arizona Cardinals off the Vikings' practice squad. On August 31, 2019, the Cardinals released Gossett.

=== New England Patriots ===
On September 2, 2019, Gossett was signed to the New England Patriots practice squad. He was released on September 11.

=== Cleveland Browns (first stint) ===
Gossett was signed to the Cleveland Browns' practice squad on September 12, 2019. He was promoted to the active roster on December 24, 2019.

On August 5, 2020, Gossett announced he would opt out of the 2020 season due to the COVID-19 pandemic.

Gossett was waived by the Browns on August 31, 2021.

=== Atlanta Falcons ===
On September 1, 2021, Gossett was claimed off of waivers by his hometown team the Atlanta Falcons, which also reunited him with Dwayne Ledford, the Falcons offensive line coach and Gossett's coach at Appalachian State.

On March 17, 2022, Gossett signed a deal to return to the Falcons.

=== Cleveland Browns (second stint) ===
On May 3, 2023, Gossett signed with the Browns. On August 27, 2023, Gossett was released by the Browns.

=== New Orleans Saints ===
On January 3, 2024, Gossett signed with the New Orleans Saints practice squad. He was not signed to a reserve/future contract and thus became a free agent at the end of the season.
