= Zak Kuhr =

American football coach (born 1988)

New England Patriots
- Title: Defensive coordinator

Personal information
- Born: April 19, 1988 (age 38)

Career history
- Mandarin HS (FL) () Assistant coach; Westside HS (FL) () Offensive coordinator; Edward Waters (2009–2010) Special teams coordinator; Ohio State (2011–2012) Intern; Old Dominion (2013) Graduate assistant; James Madison (2014–2015); Running backs coach (2014); Co-offensive coordinator (2015); Rutgers (2016) Running backs coach; Texas State (2017–2018); Co-offensive coordinator & running backs (2017); Associate head coach (2018); Texas (2019) Assistant coach; Tennessee Titans (2020–2023); Defensive quality control coach (2020); Inside linebackers assistant (2021–2023); New York Giants (2024) Defensive assistant; New England Patriots (2025–present); Inside linebackers coach/Defensive playcaller (2025); Defensive coordinator (2026–present)
- Coaching profile at Pro Football Reference

Zachary Adam Kuhr (born April 19, 1988) is an American professional football coach who is the defensive coordinator for the New England Patriots of the National Football League (NFL).

A graduate of the University of Florida, Kuhr bounced around various college and NFL teams before eventually landing a job as the inside linebackers coach for the Patriots. Amid the absence of Patriots defensive coordinator Terrell Williams during the 2025 season for medical treatment, he was promoted to being the team's defensive playcaller and de facto defensive coordinator, during which he helped the Patriots reach Super Bowl LX. On February 17, 2026, it was announced that the Patriots had named him defensive coordinator.

== Coaching career ==
=== Early career ===
Kuhr played football at Mandarin High School in Jacksonville, Florida, but his career was cut short due to a back injury. He was offered an assistant coaching position while still a student, then became the offensive coordinator for Nathan B. Forrest High School (now Westside High School) after graduating. He began his career as a college coach in 2009, joining Edward Waters University as their special teams coordinator for two seasons. From 2011 to 2012, he interned at Ohio State. During this time, he met Mike Vrabel and Everett Withers, both of whom would hire Kuhr after they became head coaches.

In 2013, Kuhr was a graduate assistant at Old Dominion. He joined James Madison University as the running backs coach in the 2014 season, and became co-offensive coordinator in the 2015 season. He was hired by Rutgers as their running backs coach for the 2016 season. He joined Texas State as their running backs coach and a co-offensive coordinator for the 2017 season, and became an associate head coach in the 2018 season. In 2019, Kuhr was hired by Texas as an assistant coach.

=== Tennessee Titans ===
In 2020, Kuhr was hired by the Tennessee Titans as a defensive quality coach under head coach Mike Vrabel. He had previously overlapped with Vrabel, when both were on the staff at Ohio State. In 2021, he became a inside linebackers assistant and stayed in this role for three seasons.

Although Kuhr was primarily an offensive coach in his collegiate career, Vrabel hired him as a defensive coach to help defensive players prepare for college-style offensive schemes that were becoming popular in the NFL. During his time in Tennessee, he was mentored by longtime defensive coaches Jim Schwartz and Shane Bowen.

=== New York Giants ===
In 2024, Kuhr was hired as a defensive assistant for the New York Giants.

=== New England Patriots ===
In 2025, Kuhr was hired by the New England Patriots to be their inside linebackers coach, reuniting with Mike Vrabel. During the season, Kuhr took over defensive playcalling duties after defensive coordinator Terrell Williams was diagnosed with prostate cancer and stepped away from the team to undergo treatment. Under Kuhr, the Patriots defense ranked eighth in yards allowed per game and fourth in points allowed; moreover, it gave up just two touchdowns in their first three playoff games, leading to Super Bowl LX, where the Patriots lost to the Seattle Seahawks. After the Super Bowl, the Patriots announced Williams would leave the defensive coordinator role for an undisclosed role on the coaching staff; on February 17, the Patriots announced they had promoted Kuhr to defensive coordinator full-time.

== Personal life ==
Kuhr attended the University of Florida before he began his career in college coaching.
