= Jaleel Scott =

American football player (born 1995)

No. 12, 18
- Position: Wide receiver

Personal information
- Born: February 23, 1995 (age 31); Rock Hill, South Carolina, U.S.
- Listed height: 6 ft 5 in (1.96 m)
- Listed weight: 210 lb (95 kg)

Career information
- High school: Rock Hill
- College: Ellsworth CC (2013–2015); New Mexico State (2016–2017)
- NFL draft: 2018: 4th round, 132nd overall pick

Career history
- Baltimore Ravens (2018–2019); New York Jets (2020)

Awards and highlights
- First-team All-Sun Belt (2017)

Career NFL statistics
- Receptions: 2
- Receiving yards: 22
- Stats at Pro Football Reference

Jaleel Scott (born February 23, 1995) is an American former professional football player who was a wide receiver in the National Football League (NFL). He played college football for the New Mexico State Aggies, and was selected by the Baltimore Ravens in the fourth round of the 2018 NFL draft. He was also a member of the New York Jets.

== Early life ==
Scott attended and played high school football at Rock Hill High School.

== College career ==
Scott was recruited to play for Maryland but did not qualify academically. He played for three years at Ellsworth Community College and had 45 receptions, 668 yards, nine touchdowns in 2015. Scott had 23 receptions for 283 yards and five touchdowns after transferring to New Mexico State in 2016. The following year, he recorded 1,079 yards and nine touchdowns on 76 receptions. He was a first-team all-conference selection and had a one-handed touchdown catch against Arizona State.

== Professional career ==
Pre-draft measurables
Height	Weight	Arm length	Hand span	Wingspan	40-yard dash	10-yard split	20-yard split	20-yard shuttle	Three-cone drill	Vertical jump	Broad jump	Bench press
6 ft 4 3/4 in (1.95 m)	218 lb (99 kg)	33 1/2 in (0.85 m)	10 1/2 in (0.27 m)	6 ft 9 1/4 in (2.06 m)	4.56 s	1.56 s	2.62 s	4.25 s	7.06 s	34.5 in (0.88 m)	10 ft 4 in (3.15 m)	16 reps
All values from NFL Combine/Pro Day

=== Baltimore Ravens ===
Scott was selected by the Baltimore Ravens in the fourth round, 132nd overall pick, of the 2018 NFL draft. He was placed on injured reserve on August 27, 2018.

Scott was waived by the Ravens during final roster cuts on September 5, 2020.

=== New York Jets ===
On September 10, 2020, Scott was signed to the practice squad of the New York Jets. He was elevated to the active roster on October 31 and December 12 for the team's weeks 8 and 14 games against the Kansas City Chiefs and Seattle Seahawks, and reverted to the practice squad after each game. Scott recorded his second career reception against the Kansas City Chiefs for 16 yards on 1 target. He signed a reserve/future contract with the Jets on January 4, 2021. He was waived on May 7, 2021.
