= WBOX =

WBOX may refer to:

- WBOX (AM), a radio station (920 AM) licensed to Bogalusa, Louisiana, United States
- WBOX-FM, a radio station (92.9 FM) licensed to Varnado, Louisiana, United States
