= Bogalusa Heart Study =

== Bogalusa Heart Study ==
The Bogalusa Heart Study is a long-term, ongoing epidemiological study that investigates the early natural history of cardiovascular disease (CVD) and its risk factors. Initiated in 1972 in Bogalusa, Louisiana, United States, the study is recognized as one of the most significant community-based studies of atherosclerosis and CVD in children and young adults. The study began in 1973, with the objective of investigating the early natural history of cardiovascular disease in a cohort of children and young adults from a biracial, semirural community in Bogalusa, Louisiana.

== Impact ==
The Bogalusa Heart Study has influenced public health policy and clinical guidelines, including recommendations for monitoring and managing blood pressure, cholesterol, and obesity in children. It has resulted in over 1,200 scientific publications and continues to contribute to the understanding of cardiovascular disease epidemiology.
