= 2017 Louisiana Ragin' Cajuns football team =

American college football season

2017 Louisiana Ragin' Cajuns football
- Conference: Sun Belt Conference
- Record: 5–7 (4–4 Sun Belt)
- Head coach: Mark Hudspeth (7th season)
- Offensive coordinator: Rob Sale (1st season)
- Defensive coordinator: Charlie Harbison (3rd season)
- Home stadium: Cajun Field

2017 Sun Belt Conference football standings
	Conf.			Overall
Team	W		L	W		L
Troy +	7	–	1	11	–	2
Appalachian State +	7	–	1	9	–	4
Arkansas State	6	–	2	7	–	5
Georgia State	5	–	3	7	–	5
New Mexico State	4	–	4	7	–	6
Louisiana	4	–	4	5	–	7
Louisiana–Monroe	4	–	4	4	–	8
Idaho	3	–	5	4	–	8
South Alabama	3	–	5	4	–	8
Coastal Carolina *	2	–	6	3	–	9
Georgia Southern	2	–	6	2	–	10
Texas State	1	–	7	2	–	10
+ – Conference co-champions; * – Ineligible for postseason play due to FCS-to-FBS transition rules

The 2017 Louisiana Ragin' Cajuns football team represented the University of Louisiana at Lafayette in the 2017 NCAA Division I FBS football season. The Ragin' Cajuns played their home games at Cajun Field in Lafayette, Louisiana, and competed in the Sun Belt Conference. They were led by seventh-year head coach Mark Hudspeth. They finished the season 5–7, 4–4 in Sun Belt play to finish in a three-way tie for fifth place.

On December 3, the day following their final season game (a blowout loss against Appalachian State, 63–14), head coach Mark Hudspeth was fired. He finished with a seven-year record of 51–38. However, due to NCAA sanctions in 2016 because former assistant coach David Saunders arranged fraudulent college entrance exams for recruits, his official record was 29–38. On December 15, the school hired Billy Napier as head coach.

== Offseason ==
=== Recruiting class ===
College recruiting
Name	Hometown	School	Height	Weight	40^{‡}	Commit date
SchDarren Archie #11 DB	Brandon, MS	Brandon HS	6 ft 2 in (1.88 m)	185 lb (84 kg)	-	Feb 1, 2017
SchDarren Archie #11 DB	Recruit ratings: Scout: Rivals: 247Sports: ESPN:					
Karson Block; LB	Mission Viejo, CA	Atascadero HS/Saddleback	6 ft 1 in (1.85 m)	185 lb (84 kg)	-	Feb 1, 2017
Karson Block; LB	Recruit ratings: Scout: Rivals: 247Sports: ESPN:					
Lavante Espon; OL	Greenville, MS	Washington HS	6 ft 3 in (1.91 m)	315 lb (143 kg)	-	Feb 1, 2017
Lavante Espon; OL	Recruit ratings: Scout: Rivals: 247Sports: ESPN:					
Kadon Harrison #19 QB	Port Arthur, TX	Memorial HS	6 ft 0 in (1.83 m)	180 lb (82 kg)	-	Feb 1, 2017
Kadon Harrison #19 QB	Recruit ratings: Scout: Rivals: 247Sports: ESPN:					
Bennie Higgins #15 DE	Greenwood, MS	Greenwood HS/Mississippi Delta	6 ft 0 in (1.83 m)	223 lb (101 kg)	-	Feb 1, 2017
Bennie Higgins #15 DE	Recruit ratings: Scout: Rivals: 247Sports: ESPN:					
Zi'Yon Hill #39 DT	New Iberia, LA	Catholic HS	6 ft 2 in (1.88 m)	280 lb (130 kg)	-	Feb 1, 2017
Zi'Yon Hill #39 DT	Recruit ratings: Scout: Rivals: 247Sports: ESPN:					
Ja'len Johnson #40 DB	Morgan City, LA	Central Catholic HS	6 ft 3 in (1.91 m)	200 lb (91 kg)	-	Feb 1, 2017
Ja'len Johnson #40 DB	Recruit ratings: Scout: Rivals: 247Sports: ESPN:					
Andre Jones Jr. #50 DE	Varnado, LA	Varnado HS	6 ft 5 in (1.96 m)	200 lb (91 kg)	-	Feb 1, 2017
Andre Jones Jr. #50 DE	Recruit ratings: Scout: Rivals: 247Sports: ESPN:					
Levi Lewis #17 QB	Baton Rouge, LA	Scotlandville Magnet HS	5 ft 11 in (1.80 m)	175 lb (79 kg)	-	Feb 1, 2017
Levi Lewis #17 QB	Recruit ratings: Scout: Rivals: 247Sports: ESPN:					
Ryheem Malone #13 WR	Houston, TX	Bellaire HS/SMU	5 ft 9 in (1.75 m)	1,852 lb (840 kg)	-	Feb 1, 2017
Ryheem Malone #13 WR	Recruit ratings: Scout: Rivals: 247Sports: ESPN:					
Elijah Mitchell #15 RB	Erath, LA	Erath HS	5 ft 11 in (1.80 m)	215 lb (98 kg)	-	Feb 1, 2017
Elijah Mitchell #15 RB	Recruit ratings: Scout: Rivals: 247Sports: ESPN:					
Earnest Patterson #22 WR	Brenham, TX	Brenham HS/Blinn College	5 ft 7 in (1.70 m)	155 lb (70 kg)	-	Feb 1, 2017
Earnest Patterson #22 WR	Recruit ratings: Scout: Rivals: 247Sports: ESPN:					
Julius Perkins #20 LB	Houston, TX	Summer Creek HS/Blinn College	6 ft 3 in (1.91 m)	200 lb (91 kg)	-	Feb 1, 2017
Julius Perkins #20 LB	Recruit ratings: Scout: Rivals: 247Sports: ESPN:					
Chase Rogers #80 TE	Bay St. Louis, MS	St. Stanislaus HS	6 ft 4 in (1.93 m)	248 lb (112 kg)	-	Feb 1, 2017
Chase Rogers #80 TE	Recruit ratings: Scout: Rivals: 247Sports: ESPN:					
Carlos Rubio #65 OL	Alexandria, LA	Alexandria Senior HS	6 ft 5 in (1.96 m)	250 lb (110 kg)	-	Feb 1, 2017
Carlos Rubio #65 OL	Recruit ratings: Scout: Rivals: 247Sports: ESPN:					
Bralen Trahan #24 DB	Lafayette, LA	Acadiana HS	6 ft 0 in (1.83 m)	180 lb (82 kg)	-	Feb 1, 2017
Bralen Trahan #24 DB	Recruit ratings: Scout: Rivals: 247Sports: ESPN:					
Staten Wade #70 OL	Texarkana, AR	Reedley HS/Arkansas	6 ft 5 in (1.96 m)	285 lb (129 kg)	-	Feb 1, 2017
Staten Wade #70 OL	Recruit ratings: Scout: Rivals: 247Sports: ESPN:					
Overall recruit ranking:
Note: In many cases, Scout, Rivals, 247Sports, On3, and ESPN may conflict in their listings of height and weight.; In these cases, the average was taken. ESPN grades are on a 100-point scale.; Sources: "2017 Team Ranking". Rivals.com.

== Preseason ==
=== Award watchlists ===
Award	Player	Position	Year
Lou Groza Award	Stevie Artigue	K	SR
Wuerffel Trophy	Grant Horst	OL	SR

=== Sun Belt Media Day ===
==== Predicted standings ====
Sun Belt Conference predicted standings
Predicted finish	Team	Votes (1st Place)
1	Appalachian State	136 (7)
2	Troy	127 (2)
3	Arkansas State	122 (1)
4	South Alabama	98
5	Louisiana	95 (1)
6	Idaho	84
7	Georgia Southern	82
8	Georgia State	48
9	Louisiana-Monroe	46
10	New Mexico State	41 (1)
11	Texas State	31
12	Coastal Carolina	26

==== Preseason All–Conference Team ====
Offensive

OL Kevin Dotson (second team)
WR Keenan Barnes (Third Team)
OL Robert Hunt (Third Team)
OL D'Aquin Withrow (Third Team)

Defense

DL Joe Dillon (first team)
DB Tracy Walker (Third Team)

Specialists

K Stevie Artigue (first team)

== Roster ==
2017 Louisiana Ragin' Cajuns football team roster
Players
Coaches
Offense

Pos.	#	Name	Class
WR	2	Ja'Marcus Bradley	So
QB	3	Jordan Davis	Jr
RB	4	Jordan Wright	So
WR	6	Michael Jacquet	So
QB	7	Andre Nunez	Jr
QB	8	Dion Ray	So
RB	9	Trey Ragas	RFr
TE	10	Matt Barnes	Sr
TE	11	Raynard Ford	Sr
WR	13	Ryheem Malone	Jr
RB	15	Elijah Mitchell	Fr
QB	16	Jake Arceneaux	RFr
QB	17	Levi Lewis	Fr
WR	18	Devin Scott	Sr
QB	19	Kadon Harrison	Fr
WR	20	Jarrod Jackson	So
WR	21	Keenan Barnes	Jr
WR	22	Earnest Patterson	Jr
RB	23	Darius Hoggins	Sr
WR	24	Tydrell Wright	Jr
RB	25	Raymond Calais	So
WR	26	Lenard Calloway	Jr
WR	28	Chris Collins	Jr
WR	29	Jalen Williams	RFr
RB	30	Maurice Britton	Fr
TE	31	Alex Allen	So
TE	33	Carlos Robinson	So
WR	35	Leon Duncan	Sr
WR	36	LeRoy Franklin	RFr
RB	39	Ashton Johnson	So
TE	47	Andre Landry	Fr
OL	50	Robert Hunt	So
OL	52	Craig Smith	Sr
OL	60	D'Aquin Withrow	Sr
OL	61	Cole Prudhomme	So
OL	63	Spencer Gardner	Fr
OL	64	Shane Vallot	Fr
OL	65	Carlos Rubio	Fr
OL	66	Rico Robinson	So
OL	67	Ken Marks	So
OL	69	Caden Cunningham	So
OL	70	Staten Wade	So
OL	71	Akkai Ward	RFr
OL	72	Grant Horst	Sr
OL	73	David Hudson	Fr
OL	75	Kevin Dotson	So
OL	77	Adrian Goodacre	Jr
OL	79	Kordell Brewster	Jr
TE	80	Chase Rogers	Fr
WR	83	Pat Hughes	Fr
WR	84	Cameron Howell	RFr
WR	85	Calif Gossett	RFr
TE	87	Chris Turner	So

Defense

Pos.	#	Name	Class
DB	2	Levarious Varnado	Sr
DE	3	Joe Dillon	So
DE	4	Trev Miller	Sr
DB	6	Corey Turner	Jr
DB	7	Travis Crawford	Sr
DB	8	Simeon Thomas	Sr
DB	9	Kamar Greenhouse	So
DE	10	Jarvis Jeffries	Sr
DB	11	Lorenzo Cryer	Jr
DB	13	Vince Thomas	Jr
DE	15	Bennie Higgins	So
DB	16	Denarius Howard	Sr
DB	17	Damar'ren Mitchell	So
DB	18	Darrell Miller	Jr
DB	19	Troy McCollum	Sr
LB	20	Julius Perkins	Jr
LB	21	Alonzo Brown	So
LB	22	Tanner Wiggins	RFr
DB	23	Tracy Walker	Sr
DB	24	Jeremiah West	Fr
DB	25	Deuce Wallace	So
LB	26	Brayden Bailey	Jr
DB	27	Caleb Glenn	Fr
DB	28	Bralen Trahan	Fr
DB	29	Koa Haynes	Jr
LB	30	T.J. Posey	Sr
DB	31	SchDarren Archie	Fr
DB	33	Jamarius Williams	Jr
LB	34	Ferrod Gardner	So
LB	35	Chaiziere Malbrue	Jr
DB	37	Blair Brooks	So
DB	37	Errol Brown	So
LB	38	Terik Miller	So
DT	39	Zi'Yon Hill	Fr
DB	40	Ja'len Johnson	Fr
LB	41	Brijuan Dace	Fr
LB	43	Jourdon Quibodeaux	Fr
LB	45	Shay LaPorte	Jr
DE	46	Mustafa Mitchell	Jr
LB	48	Noah Fontenot	Fr
DE	50	Andre Jones	Fr
LB	51	Ken Jones	Fr
DT	53	Christian Cederquist	Jr
DE	54	Hunter Bergeron	Fr
DE	55	Tommy Whitted	Jr
DE	56	Terrence Jones	So
LB	58	Justin Middleton	Jr
LB	59	Jacques Boudreaux	So
DT	62	Daniel Chapman	RFr
DT	76	Kendall Baker	RFr
DT	90	Kevon Perry	Sr
DT	92	Taboris Lee	Sr
DT	93	Darryl Johnson	So
DT	94	Andarious Jones	Sr
DT	95	Rodrick Stephens	Sr
DE	96	Malcolm Rollins	Fr
DT	98	LaDarrius Kidd	Jr
DT	99	Tra'Vontae Booker	So

Special teams

Pos.	#	Name	Class
P	27	Sam Geraci	Sr
K	34	Hayden Yezak	Fr
K	36	Stevie Artigue	Jr
K	38	Calvin Linden	Jr
LS	49	Paul Boudreaux	Fr
LS	57	Jackson Ladner	Jr
P	88	Seth Kootsouradis	RFr
K	89	Gabe Pontiff	Fr

Head coach

- Mark Hudspeth

Coordinators/assistant coaches

- Reed Stringer – Assistant HC/TEs/Recruiting
- Will Hall – Offensive Coordinator/QBs
- Mike Lucas – Defensive Coordinator/LBs
- Charlie Harbison – Co-Defensive Coordinator/DB
- Michael Desormeaux – Running Backs
- Jorge Munoz – Wide Receivers
- Mitch Rodrigue – Run Game Coordinator/OL
- Marquase Lovings – Defensive Ends
- Levorn Harbin – Defensive Line
- Lewis Caralla – Strength Coach
- Troy Wingerter – Director of Ops
- Ryan Trichel – Dir. of Player Personnel
- Austin Armstrong – Offensive GA
- Eddie Gordon – Offensive GA
- Preston Bates – Offensive GA
- Brent Jackson – Defensive Quality Control
- Jordan Frazier – Special Teams Quality Control
- Kevon Beckwith – Defensive GA
- Dominic Jones – Defensive GA
- Zerrick Rollins – Defensive Analyst
- Gunner Hudspeth – Offensive Intern
- Ryan Benoit – Graphic Designer
- Mike Richard – Recruiting Intern
- Danielle Roseberry – FB Administrative Asst.
- Tanya Howard – FB Recruiting Asst.
- Kerry Conner – Equipment Manager
- Travis Soileau – Head Athletic Trainer
- Darren Walker – Video Coordinator
- Matt Sullivan – Athletics Communications
- Jeff Schneider – Athletics Communications
- James Lang – Asst. Strength Coach
- Dylan Cintula – Asst. Strength Coach
- Karli Collins – Assistant Athletic Trainer

Legend

- (C) Team captain
- (S) Suspended
- (I) Ineligible
- Injured
- Redshirt

Roster

== Schedule ==
Louisiana announced its 2017 football schedule on March 1, 2017. The 2017 schedule consisted of five home and seven away games in the regular season. The Ragin' Cajuns hosted Sun Belt foes Georgia Southern, Louisiana-Monroe, New Mexico State, and Texas State, and traveled to Appalachian State, Arkansas State, Idaho, and South Alabama

The Ragin' Cajuns hosted one of the four non-conference opponents, Southeastern Louisiana from the Southland Conference, and traveled to Tulsa from the American Athletic Conference and Southeastern Conference members Ole Miss and Texas A&M.

Date	Time	Opponent	Site	TV	Result	Attendance
September 2	6:00 p.m.	Southeastern Louisiana*	Cajun Field; Lafayette, LA (rivalry)	ESPN3	W 51–48	18,289
September 9	3:00 p.m.	at Tulsa*	H. A. Chapman Stadium; Tulsa, OK	ESPN3	L 42–66	17,758
September 16	11:00 a.m.	at Texas A&M*	Kyle Field; College Station, TX	SECN	L 21–45	98,412
September 23	4:00 p.m.	Louisiana–Monroe	Cajun Field; Lafayette, LA (Battle on the Bayou)	ESPN3	L 50–56 ^{2OT}	18,318
October 7	4:00 p.m.	at Idaho	Kibbie Dome; Moscow, ID	ESPN3	W 21–16	14,198
October 12	6:30 p.m.	Texas State	Cajun Field; Lafayette, LA	ESPNU	W 24–7	13,106
October 19	6:30 p.m.	at Arkansas State	Centennial Bank Stadium; Jonesboro, AR	ESPNU	L 3–47	21,943
November 4	3:00 p.m.	at South Alabama	Ladd–Peebles Stadium; Mobile, AL	ESPN3	W 19–14	12,742
November 11	11:00 a.m.	at Ole Miss*	Vaught–Hemingway Stadium; Oxford, MS	SECN	L 22–50	51,618
November 18	4:00 p.m.	New Mexico State^{†}	Cajun Field; Lafayette, LA	ESPN3	W 47–34	16,058
November 25	4:00 p.m.	Georgia Southern	Cajun Field; Lafayette, LA	ESPN3	L 24–34	12,993
December 2	1:30 p.m.	at Appalachian State	Kidd Brewer Stadium; Boone, NC	ESPN3	L 14–63	23,411
*Non-conference game; ^{†}Homecoming; All times are in Central time

Schedule source:

== Game summaries ==
=== Southeastern Louisiana ===
Southeastern Louisiana at Louisiana

Team	1	2	3	4	Total
Lions	21	14	0	3	38
• Ragin' Cajuns	21	14	7	9	51

- Date: September 2, 2017
- Location: Cajun Field
  Lafayette, LA
- Game start: 6:05 p.m. CDT
- Elapsed time: 3 hours and 32 minutes
- Game attendance: 18,289
- Game weather: 85 °F (29 °C) • Weather: Clear • Wind: 4 N MPH
- Referee: Jason Autrey
- Television network: ESPN3

Scoring summary
1	14:49	LA	Raymond Calais 97-yard kickoff returned (Stevie Artigue kick) (0 plays, 0 yards, 0:00)	LA 7–0
1	11:22	SELA	Eugene Bethea 42-yard rush (Dillon Burkhard kick) (7 plays, 68 yards, 3:27)	TIE 7–7
1	09:47	SELA	Max Lyons 60-yard punt returned (Dillon Burkhard kick) (0 plays, 0 yards, 0:00)	SELA 14–7
1	07:08	LA	Trey Ragas 54–yard rush (Stevie Artigue kick) (6 plays, 78 yards, 2:39)	TIE 14–14
1	03:09	SELA	Eugene Bethea 1-yard rush (Dillon Burkhard kick) (2 plays, 2 yards, 0:30)	SELA 21–14
1	02:57	LA	Raymond Calais 100-yard kickoff returned (Stevie Artigue kick) (0 plays, 0 yards, 0:00)	TIE 21–21
2	13:47	LA	Ryheem Malone 15-yard pass from Jordan Davis (Stevie Artigue kick) (4 plays, 45 yards, 1:00)	LA 28–21
2	12:53	SELA	Julius Maracalin 54-yard rush (Dillon Burkhard kick) (2 plays, 58 yards, 0:54)	TIE 28–28
2	10:01	LA	Dion Ray 1-yard rush (Stevie Artigue kick) (6 plays, 72 yards, 2:52)	LA 35–28
2	00:05	SELA	Zeke Jenkins 1-yard pass from Lorenzo Nunez (Dillon Burkhard kick) (10 plays, 70 yards, 2:37)	TIE 35–35
3	05:11	LA	Jordan Wright 3-yard rush (Stevie Artigue kick) (10 plays, 50 yards, 4:38)	LA 42–35
4	10:08	SELA	Bransen Schwebel 3-yard pass from Lorenzo Nunez (Dillon Burkhard kick) (9 plays, 80 yards, 3:35)	TIE 42–42
4	08:41	LA	Elijah Mitchell 2-yard rush (Stevie Artigue kick) (9 plays, 80 yards, 3:35)	LA 49–42
4	00:42	SELA	N Jackson 29-yard pass from Lorenzo Nunez (Lorenzo Nunez 2 pt. conversion rush fumbled) (10 plays, 95 yards, 2:34)	LA 49–48
4	00:42	LA	Joe Dillon 98-yard PAT returned (0 plays, 0 yards, 0:00)	LA 51–48

Statistics	Southeastern Louisiana	Louisiana
First downs	24	16
Total yards	514	369
Rushing yards	343	201
Passing yards	171	162
Turnovers	2	0
Time of possession	34:07	25:53

Team	Category	Player	Statistics
Southeastern Louisiana	Passing	Lorenzo Nunez	15-25, 171 yards, 3 TDs, INT
Southeastern Louisiana	Rushing	Eugene Bethea	23 carries, 187 yards, 2 TDs
Southeastern Louisiana	Receiving	Juwan Dickey	8 receptions, 99 yards
Louisiana	Passing	Jordan Davis	12-23, 162 yards, 1 TD
Louisiana	Rushing	Trey Ragas	4 carries, 61 yards, 1 TD
Louisiana	Receiving	Keenan Barnes	3 receptions, 70 yards

=== At Tulsa ===
Louisiana at Tulsa

Team	1	2	3	4	Total
Ragin' Cajuns	10	13	12	7	42
• Golden Hurricane	10	28	7	21	66

- Date: September 9, 2017
- Location: Skelly Field at H. A. Chapman Stadium
  Tulsa, OK
- Game start: 3:05 p.m. CDT
- Elapsed time: 3 hours and 40 minutes
- Game attendance: 17,758
- Game weather: 86 °F (30 °C) • Weather: Clear • Wind: 8 SE MPH
- Referee: Jeremy Parker
- Television network: ESPN3

Scoring summary
1	12:02	TUL	Redford Jones 26-yard field goal (11 plays, 36 yards, 2:58)	TUL 3–0
1	08:08	LA	Stevie Artigue 36-yard field goal (8 plays, 54 yards, 3:54)	LA 7–3
1	06:04	TUL	D'Angelo Brewer 50-yard rush (Redford Jones kick) (5 plays, 93 yards, 1:58)	TUL 10–3
1	01:32	LA	Jordan Davis 1–yard rush (Stevie Artigue kick) (10 plays, 54 yards, 4:28)	TIE 10–10
2	11:35	TUL	Chad President 5-yard rush (Redford Jones kick) (15 plays, 71 yards, 4:51)	TUL 17–10
2	09:09	LA	Elijah Mitchell 20-yard rush (Stevie Artigue kick) (6 plays, 63 yards, 2:19)	TIE 17–17
2	07:42	TUL	Corey Taylor II 4-yard rush (Redford Jones kick) (6 plays, 70 yards, 1:20)	TUL 24–17
2	02:05	LA	Keenan Barnes 15-yard pass from Jordan Davis (Stevie Artigue PAT failed) (4 plays, 39 yards, 1:13)	TUL 24–23
2	01:35	TUL	Justin Hobbs 69-yard pass from Chad President (Redford Jones kick) (2 plays, 73 yards, 0:23)	TUL 31–23
2	00:06	TUL	Corey Taylor II 1-yard rush (Redford Jones kick) (4 plays, 69 yards, 0:26)	TUL 38–23
3	13:11	LA	Elijah Mitchell 19-yard pass from Jordan Davis (Jordan Davis two-point conversion pass attempt failed) (6 plays, 75 yards, 1:49)	TUL 38–29
3	07:06	LA	Jordan Davis 9-yard rush (Calvin Linden PAT failed) (10 plays, 77 yards, 4:08)	TUL 38–35
3	04:00	TUL	D'Angelo Brewer 1-yard rush (Redford Jones kick) (11 plays, 75 yards, 3:01)	TUL 45–35
4	14:05	TUL	Shamari Brooks 5-yard rush (Redford Jones kick) (7 plays, 73 yards, 1:28)	TUL 52–35
4	12:24	LA	Trey Ragas 15-yard rush (Stevie Artigue kick) (6 plays, 81 yards, 1:36)	TUL 52–42
4	07:43	TUL	D'Angelo Brewer 1-yard rush (Redford Jones kick) (10 plays, 43 yards, 4:38)	TUL 59–42
4	00:52	TUL	Chad President 2-yard rush (Redford Jones kick) (10 plays, 46 yards, 5:22)	TUL 66–42

Statistics	Louisiana	Tulsa
First downs	27	33
Total yards	596	667
Rushing yards	287	424
Passing yards	309	243
Turnovers	2	1
Time of possession	27:28	32:32

Team	Category	Player	Statistics
Louisiana	Passing	Jordan Davis	21-32, 309 yards, 2 TDs, INT
Louisiana	Rushing	Trey Ragas	11 carries, 130 yards, TD
Louisiana	Receiving	Ryheem Malone	8 receptions, 119 yards
Tulsa	Passing	Chad President	14-20, 243 yards, TD
Tulsa	Rushing	D'Angelo Brewer	38 carries, 262 yards, 3 TDs
Tulsa	Receiving	Justin Hobbs	5 receptions, 103 yards, TD

=== At Texas A&M ===
Louisiana at Texas A&M

Team	1	2	3	4	Total
Ragin' Cajuns	0	21	0	0	21
• Aggies	7	7	17	14	45

- Date: September 16, 2017
- Location: Kyle Field
  College Station, TX
- Game start: 11:01 a.m. CDT
- Elapsed time: 3 hours and 38 minutes
- Game attendance: 98,412
- Game weather: 81 °F (27 °C) • Weather: Cloudy • Wind: 8 SSE MPH
- Referee: Matt Austin
- TV announcers (SEC Network): Dave Neal and Matt Stinchcomb

Scoring summary
1	03:43	TAMU	Christian Kirk 1-yard pas from Kellen Mond (Daniel LaCamera kick) (4 plays, 51 yards, 1:37)	TAMU 7–0
2	14:10	LA	Trey Ragas 3-yard rush (Calvin Linden kick) (4 plays, 12 yards, 1:51)	TIE 7–7
2	13:52	TAMU	Jhamon Ausbon 24-yard pass from Kellen Mond (Daniel LaCamera kick) (1 play, 24 yards, 0:18)	TAMU 14–7
2	09:15	LA	Ryheem Malone 8-yard pass from Jordan Davis (Stevie Artigue kick) (6 plays, 37 yards, 3:00)	TIE 14–14
2	00:07	LA	Jordan Wright 1-yard pass from Jordan Davis (Stevie Artigue kick) (13 plays, 81 yards, 2:55)	LA 21–14
3	10:27	TAMU	Kellen Mond 5-yard rush (Daniel LaCamera kick) (9 plays, 81 yards, 2:19)	TIE 21–21
3	06:23	TAMU	Camron Buckley 12-yard pass from Kellen Mond (Daniel LaCamera kick) (10 plays, 74 yards, 3:04)	TAMU 28–21
3	00:43	TAMU	Daniel LaCamera 28-yard field goal (11 plays, 67 yards, 3:41)	TAMU 31–21
4	14:51	TAMU	Tyrel Dodson 40-yard interception returned (Daniel LaCamera kick) (3 plays, 12 yards, 0:52)	TAMU 38–21
4	06:41	TAMU	Jacob Kibodi 67-yard rush (Daniel LaCamera kick) (2 plays, 61 yards, 6:41)	TAMU 45–21

Statistics	Louisiana	Texas A&M
First downs	17	27
Total yards	309	480
Rushing yards	93	179
Passing yards	216	301
Turnovers	5	2
Time of possession	29:10	30:50

Team	Category	Player	Statistics
Louisiana	Passing	Jordan Davis	27-43, 197 yards, 2 TDs, 3 INTs
Louisiana	Rushing	Trey Ragas	14 carries, 93 yards, 1 TD
Louisiana	Receiving	Keenan Barnes	12 receptions, 118 yards
Texas A&M	Passing	Kellen Mond	21-34, 301 yards, 3 TDs, 1 INT
Texas A&M	Rushing	Jacob Kibodi	4 carries, 101 yards, 1 TD
Texas A&M	Receiving	Damion Ratley	2 receptions, 86 yards

=== Louisiana–Monroe ===
Louisiana–Monroe at Louisiana

Team	1	2	3	4	OT	2OT	Total
• Warhawks	9	14	7	13	7	6	56
Ragin' Cajuns	0	13	9	21	7	0	50

- Date: September 23, 2017
- Location: Cajun Field
  Lafayette, LA
- Game start: 4:05 p.m. CDT
- Elapsed time: 3 hours and 42 minutes
- Game attendance: 18,318
- Game weather: 91 °F (33 °C) • Weather: Partly cloudy • Wind: 4 ESE MPH
- Referee: Ted Pitts
- Television network: ESPN3

Scoring summary
1	08:00	ULM	Caleb Evans 7-yard rush (Craig Ford kick) (11 plays, 89 yards, 4:09)	ULM 7–0
1	00:39	ULM	Team safety (3 plays, -1 yards, 1:16)	ULM 9–0
2	13:22	ULM	Caleb Evans 38-yard rush (Craig Ford kick) (6 plays, 59 yards, 2:17)	ULM 16–0
2	11:21	LA	Elijah Mitchell 1-yard rush (Stevie Artigue kick) (5 plays, 75 yards, 2:01)	ULM 16–7
2	07:16	ULM	Derrick Gore 2-yard rush (Craig Ford kick) (10 plays, 77 yards, 4:05)	ULM 23–7
2	02:52	LA	Elijah Mitchell 10-yard rush (Stevie Artigue PAT failed) (11 plays, 75 yards, 4:24)	ULM 23–13
3	05:16	LA	Stevie Artigue 20-yard field goal (13 plays, 67 yards, 5:30)	ULM 23–16
3	03:26	ULM	Caleb Evans 7-yard rush (Craig Ford kick) (4 plays, 52 yards, 1:50)	ULM 30–16
3	00:51	LA	Dion Ray 6-yard rush (Stevie Artigue PAT failed) (7 plays, 75 yards, 2:35)	ULM 30–22
4	13:46	ULM	Caleb Evans 5-yard rush (Craig Ford PAT failed) (6 plays, 80 yards, 2:05)	ULM 36–22
4	09:35	ULM	Caleb Evans 6-yard rush (Craig Ford kick) (7 plays, 75 yards, 3:12)	ULM 43–22
4	07:03	LA	Trey Ragas 1-yard rush (Calvin Linden kick) (10 plays, 83 yards, 2:32)	ULM 43–29
4	03:34	LA	Jarrod Jackson 12-yard pass from Andre Nunez (Calvin Linden kick) (7 plays, 37 yards, 1:33)	ULM 43–36
4	00:00	LA	Ja'Marcus Bradley 14-yard pass from Andre Nunez (Calvin Linden kick) (8 plays, 84 yards, 1:36)	TIE 43–43
1OT		ULM	RJ Turner 15-yard pass from Caleb Evans (Craig Ford kick) (5 plays, 25 yards)	ULM 50–43
1OT		LA	Andre Nunez 6-yard rush (Calvin Linden kick) (7 plays, 25 yards)	TIE 50–50
2OT		ULM	Derrick Gore 8-yard rush (4 plays, 25 yards)	ULM 56–50

Statistics	Louisiana–Monroe	Louisiana
First downs	13	29
Total yards	310	607
Rushing yards	65	331
Passing yards	245	276
Turnovers	1	1
Time of possession	27:01	32:59

Team	Category	Player	Statistics
Louisiana–Monroe	Passing	Caleb Evans	28-34, 343 yards, 1 TD
Louisiana–Monroe	Rushing	Caleb Evans	16 carries, 129 yards, 5 TDs
Louisiana–Monroe	Receiving	Marcus Green	8 receptions, 117 yards
Louisiana	Passing	Andre Nunez	22-37, 287 yards, 2 TDs
Louisiana	Rushing	Elijah Mitchell	13 carries, 107 yards, 2 TDs
Louisiana	Receiving	Jarrod Jackson	7 receptions, 113 yards, 1 TD

=== At Idaho ===
Louisiana at Idaho

Team	1	2	3	4	Total
• Ragin' Cajuns	7	7	7	0	21
Vandals	7	3	3	3	16

- Date: October 7, 2017
- Location: Kibbie Dome
  Moscow, ID
- Game start: 4:05 p.m. CDT
- Elapsed time: 3 hours and 6 minutes
- Game attendance: 14,198
- Game weather: 72 °F (22 °C) • Weather: Indoor (N/A) • Wind: Indoor (N/A)
- Referee: Ted Pitts
- Television network: ESPN3

Scoring summary
1	08:49	IDA	DJ Henderson 1-yard rush (Cade Coffey kick); 7 plays, 38 yards, 3:01)	IDA 7–0
1	02:05	LA	Dion Ray 3-yard rush (Stevie Artigue kick) (7 plays, 52 yards, 3:16)	TIE 7–7
2	09:19	LA	Trey Ragas 1-yard rush (Stevie Artigue kick) (14 plays, 83 yards, 6:48)	LA 14–7
2	01:41	IDA	Cade Coffey 26-yard field goal (10 plays, 28 yards, 4:28)	LA 14–10
3	12:50	IDA	Ja'Marcus Bradley 45-yard pass from Andre Nunez (Stevie Artigue kick) (5 plays, 75 yards, 2:10)	LA 21–10
3	06:23	IDA	Cade Coffey 37-yard field goal (7 plays, 53 yards, 2:04)	LA 21–13
4	11:22	IDA	Cade Coffey 46-yard field goal (6 plays, 18 yards, 2:10)	LA 21–16

Statistics	Louisiana	Idaho
First downs	22	13
Total yards	297	279
Rushing yards	84	103
Passing yards	213	149
Turnovers	1	0
Time of possession	30:05	29:55

Team	Category	Player	Statistics
Louisiana	Passing	Andre Nunez	18-24, 213 yards, 1 TD, 1 INT
Louisiana	Rushing	Trey Ragas	17 carries, 78 yards, 1 TD
Louisiana	Receiving	Ja'Marcus Bradley	5 receptions, 93 yards, 1 TD
Idaho	Passing	Matt Linehan	13-28, 149 yards
Idaho	Rushing	Aaron Duckworth	14 carries, 62 yards
Idaho	Receiving	Jacob Sannon	4 receptions, 58 yards

=== Texas State ===
Texas State at Louisiana

Team	1	2	3	4	Total
Bobcats	0	0	7	0	7
• Ragin' Cajuns	14	0	3	7	24

- Date: October 12, 2017
- Location: Cajun Field
  Lafayette, LA
- Game start: 6:32 p.m. CDT
- Elapsed time: 2 hours and 58 minutes
- Game attendance: 13,106
- Game weather: 86 °F (30 °C) • Weather: Clear • Wind: 8 NNE MPH
- Referee: Jeremy Parker
- Television network: ESPNU
\

Scoring summary
1	10:28	LA	Trey Ragas 11-yard rush (Stevie Artigue kick) (4 plays, 80 yards, 1:22)	LA 7–0
1	07:48	LA	Trey Ragas 2-yard rush (Stevie Artigue kick) (6 plays, 40 yards, 2:08)	LA 14–0
3	03:46	TXST	Anthony D. Taylor 1-yard rush (Foster Hilborn kick) (7 plays, 89 yards, 3:14)	LA 14–7
3	00:05	LA	Stevie Artigue 27-yard field goal (4 plays, 7 yards, 1:53)	LA 17–7
4	10:03	LA	Keenan Barnes 8-yard pass from Andre Nunez (Stevie Artigue kick) (7 plays, 83 yards, 2:34)	LA 24–7

Statistics	Texas State	Louisiana
First downs	19	19
Total yards	325	367
Rushing yards	106	135
Passing yards	219	232
Turnovers	3	0
Time of possession	30:05	29:55

Team	Category	Player	Statistics
Texas State	Passing	Willie Jones III	12-18, 197 yards, 1 INT
Texas State	Rushing	Willie Jones III	14 carries, 58 yards
Texas State	Receiving	Thurman Morbley	3 receptions, 68 yards
Louisiana	Passing	Andre Nunez	17-27, 232 yards, 1 TD
Louisiana	Rushing	Trey Ragas	19 carries, 72 yards, 2 TDs
Louisiana	Receiving	Keenan Barnes	5 receptions, 99 yards, 1 TD

=== At Arkansas State ===
Louisiana at Arkansas State

Team	1	2	3	4	Total
Ragin' Cajuns	3	0	0	0	3
• Red Wolves	14	20	3	10	47

- Date: October 19, 2017
- Location: Centennial Bank Stadium
  Jonesboro, AR
- Game start: 6:32 p.m. CDT
- Elapsed time: 3 hours and 41 minutes
- Game attendance: 21,943
- Game weather: 73 °F (23 °C) • Weather: Mostly Cloudy • Wind: 5 SE MPH
- Referee: Jason Autrey
- Television network: ESPNU

Scoring summary
1	14:17	ARST	Caleb Caston 24-yard fumble returned (Sawyer Williams kick) (3 plays, 8 yards, 0:43)	ARST 7–0
1	08:39	ARST	Johnston White 1-yard rush (Sawyer Williams kick) (6 plays, 73 yards, 2:03)	ARST 14–0
1	02:10	LA	Stevie Artigue 51-yard field goal (8 plays, 27 yards, 3:19)	ARST 14–3
2	14:07	ARST	Justin McInnis 44-yard pass from Justice Hansen (Sawyer Williams kick) (7 plays, 80 yards, 1:35)	ARST 21–3
2	04:59	ARST	Justice Hansen 20-yard rush (Sawyer Williams PAT failed) (12 plays, 80 yards, 4:22)	ARST 27–3
2	00:01	ARST	Justin McInnis 6-yard pass from Justice Hansen (Sawyer Williams kick) (7 plays, 66 yards, 0:58)	ARST 34–3
3	08:46	ARST	Sawyer Williams 24-yard field goal (8 plays, 58 yards, 2:35)	ARST 37–3
4	12:45	ARST	Sawyer Williams 28-yard field goal (7 plays, 70 yards, 2:15)	ARST 40–3
4	07:10	ARST	Chauncey Mason 10-yard rush (Sawyer Williams kick) (8 plays, 63 yards, 3:30)	ARST 47–3

Statistics	Louisiana	Arkansas State
First downs	17	29
Total yards	270	571
Rushing yards	91	262
Passing yards	179	309
Turnovers	2	1
Time of possession	33:55	26:05

Team	Category	Player	Statistics
Louisiana	Passing	Jordan Davis	11-24, 128 yards
Louisiana	Rushing	Jordan Davis	9 carries, 33 yards
Louisiana	Receiving	Michael Jacquet	6 receptions, 55 yards
Louisiana	Passing	Justice Hansen	23-37, 275 yards, 2 TDs
Louisiana	Rushing	Justice Hansen	13 carries, 121 yards, 1 TD
Louisiana	Receiving	Blake Mack	5 receptions, 65 yards

=== At South Alabama ===
Louisiana at South Alabama

Team	1	2	3	4	Total
• Ragin' Cajuns	3	16	0	0	19
Jaguars	0	7	0	7	14

- Date: November 4, 2017
- Location: Ladd–Peebles Stadium
  Mobile, AL
- Game start: 3:00 p.m. CDT
- Elapsed time: 3 hours and 18 minutes
- Game attendance: 12,742
- Game weather: 76 °F (24 °C) • Weather: Sunny • Wind: 8 SE MPH
- Referee: Marshall Lewis
- Television network: ESPN3

Scoring summary
1	04:17	LA	Stevie Artigue 37-yard field goal (7 plays, 34 yards, 2:58)	LA 3–0
2	13:34	LA	Michael Jacquet III 54-yard pass from Levi Lewis (Stevie Artigue PAT failed) (9 plays, 87 yards, 3:41)	LA 9–0
2	10:34	LA	Chase Rogers 13-yard pass from Levi Lewis (Stevie Artigue kick) (5 plays, 46 yards, 2:19)	LA 16–0
2	03:10	LA	Stevie Artigue 20-yard field goal (8 plays, 77 yards, 3:56)	LA 19–0
2	00:38	USA	Malik Stanley 12-yard pass from Cole Garvin (Gavin Patterson kick) (10 plays, 80 yards, 2:32)	LA 19–7
4	00:59	USA	Malik Stanley 18-yard pass from Cole Garvin (Gavin Patterson kick) (12 plays, 89 yards, 1:27)	LA 19–14

Statistics	Louisiana	South Alabama
First downs	16	23
Total yards	374	368
Rushing yards	264	87
Passing yards	110	281
Turnovers	0	2
Time of possession	34:29	25:31

Team	Category	Player	Statistics
Louisiana	Passing	Levi Lewis	8-15, 110 yards, 2 TDs
Louisiana	Rushing	Levi Lewis	18 carries, 129 yards
Louisiana	Receiving	Michael Jacquet	2 receptions, 58 yards, 1 TD
South Alabama	Passing	Cole Garvin	22-35, 274 yards, 2 TDs, 2 INTs
South Alabama	Rushing	Tra Minter	13 carries, 50 yards
South Alabama	Receiving	Jamarius Way	5 receptions, 110 yards

Statistics	Louisiana	Mississippi
First downs	21	30
Total yards	427	641
Rushing yards	228	223
Passing yards	199	418
Turnovers	0	1
Time of possession	30:16	29:44

=== At Ole Miss ===
Louisiana at Mississippi– Game summary

Quarter	1	2	3	4	Total
Ragin' Cajuns	0	10	0	12	22
Rebels	21	14	7	8	50

at Vaught-Hemingway Stadium, Oxford, MS

- Date: November 11
- Game time: 11:00 a.m. CST
- Game weather: 53 °F (12 °C); sunny
- Game attendance: 51,618
- Referee: John McDaid
- TV: SEC Network

Game information

First quarter

- MISS - DaMarkus Lodge 37-yard TD pass from Jordan Ta'amu, Gary Wunderlich kick good, 13:48 (MISS 7-0)
- MISS - A. J. Brown 31-yard TD pass from Ta'amu, Wunderlich kick good, 8:53 (MISS 14-0)
- MISS - Ta'amu 8-yard TD run, Wunderlich kick good, 3:46 (MISS 21-0)

Second quarter

- MISS - Brown 27-yard TD pass from Ta'amu, Wunderlich kick good, 12:59 (MISS 28-0)
- LA - Raymond Calais 31-yard TD run, Stevie Artigue kick good, 11:13 (MISS 28-7)
- MISS - Ta'amu 1-yard TD run, Wunderlich kick good, 7:56 (MISS 35-7)
- LA - Artigue 43-yard field goal, 4:45 (MISS 35-10)

Third quarter

- MISS - Jordan Wilkins 3-yard TD run, Wunderlich kick good, 9:23 (MISS 42-10)

Fourth quarter

- LA - Jordan Davis 10-yard TD run, Artigue kick no good, 13:46 (MISS 42-16)
- LA - Davis 31-yard TD run, Terik Miller kick no good, 11:42 (MISS 42-22)
- MISS - Eric Swinney 10-yard TD run, Ta'amu two-point conversion good to Lodge, 8:25 (MISS 50-22)

Top passers

- MISS - Jordan Ta'amu - 28/36, 418 yards, 3 TD, INT
- LA - Levi Lewis - 14/26, 166 yards

Top rushers

- MISS - Jordan Wilkins - 14 carries, 124 yards, TD
- LA - Jordan Davis - 4 carries, 52 yards, 2 TD

Top receivers

- MISS - A. J. Brown - 14 receptions, 185 yards, 2 TD
- LA - Ja'Marcus Bradley - 7 receptions, 105 yards

Top defenders

- MISS - Tayler Polk - 7 tackles, sack
- LA - Corey Turner - 13 tackles, sack

Statistics	New Mexico State	Louisiana
First downs	26	29
Total yards	402	505
Rushing yards	89	279
Passing yards	313	226
Turnovers	3	0
Time of possession	22:58	37:02

=== New Mexico State ===
New Mexico State at Louisiana– Game summary

Quarter	1	2	3	4	Total
Aggies	7	10	14	3	34
Ragin' Cajuns	14	17	3	13	47

at Cajun Field, Lafayette, LA

- Date: November 18
- Game time: 4:00 p.m. CST
- Game weather: 80 °F (27 °C); partly cloudy
- Game attendance: 16,048
- Referee: Ted Pitts
- TV: ESPN3

Game information

First quarter

- LA - Dion Ray 3-yard TD run, Stevie Artigue kick good, 10:46 (LA 7-0)
- NMSU - Jason Hundley 97-yard kickoff return for TD, Dylan Brown kick good, 10:30 (TIE 7-7)
- LA - Michael Jacquet III 3-yard TD pass from Jordan Davis, Artigue kick good, 2:38 (LA 14-7)

Second quarter

- LA - Trey Ragas 31-yard TD run, Artigue kick good, 9:20 (LA 21-7)
- NMSU - Brown 24-yard field goal, 5:07 (LA 21-10)
- LA - Davis 43-yard TD run, Artigue kick good, 3:33 (LA 28-10)
- NMSU - Larry Rose III 2-yard TD run, Brown kick good, 1:36 (LA 28-17)
- LA - Artigue 30-yard field goal, 0:23 (LA 31-17)

Third quarter

- NMSU - Rose III 29-yard TD pass from Tyler Rodgers, Brown kick good, 13:15 (LA 31-24)
- LA - Artigue 28-yard field goal, 7:05 (LA 34-24)
- NMSU - Rose III 7-yard TD run, Brown kick good, 3:25 (LA 34-31)

Fourth quarter

- NMSU - Brown 19-yard field goal, 14:19 (TIE 34-34)
- LA - Ryheem Malone 33-yard TD pass from Davis, Artigue kick good, 10:21 (LA 41-34)
- LA - Ragas 4-yard TD run, Artigue kick no good, 5:31 (LA 47-34)

Top passers

- LA - Jordan Davis - 20/34, 219 yards, 2 TD
- NMSU - Tyler Rodgers - 17/24, 184 yards, TD

Top rushers

- LA - Trey Ragas - 23 carries, 132 yards, 2 TD
- NMSU - Jason Huntley - 6 carries, 58 yards

Top receivers

- LA - Ryheem Malone - 7 receptions, 113 yards, TD
- NMSU - Larry Rose III - 7 receptions, 101 yards, TD

Top defenders

- LA - Jacques Boudreaux - 9 tackles
- NMSU - Ron LaForce - 15 tackles

Statistics	Georgia Southern	Louisiana
First downs	23	13
Total yards	464	379
Rushing yards	389	149
Passing yards	75	230
Turnovers	0	3
Time of possession	40:02	19:58

=== Georgia Southern ===
Georgia Southern at Louisiana– Game summary

Quarter	1	2	3	4	Total
Eagles	14	3	10	7	34
Ragin' Cajuns	0	7	3	14	24

at Cajun Field, Lafayette, LA

- Date: November 25
- Game time: 4:00 p.m. CST
- Game weather: 74 °F (23 °C); clear
- Game attendance: 12,993
- Referee: Kevin Stine
- TV: ESPN3

Game information

First quarter

- GASO - Wesley Fields 8-yard TD run, Tyler Bass kick good, 8:48 (GASO 7-0)
- GASO - Ellis Richardson 53-yard TD pass from Shai Werts, Bass kick good, 4:30 (GASO 14-0)

Second quarter

- GASO - Bass 42-yard field goal, 14:55 (GASO 17-0)
- LA - Darius Hoggins 75-yard TD run, Stevie Artigue kick good, 14:40 (GASO 17-7)

Third quarter

- GASO - Werts 6-yard TD run, Bass kick good, 12:15 (GASO 24-7)
- LA - Artigue 50-yard field goal, 8:51 (GASO 24-10)
- GASO - Bass 26-yard field goal, 3:58 (GASO 27-10)

Fourth quarter

- LA - Ryheem Malone 17-yard TD pass from Jordan Davis, Artigue kick good, 14:54 (GASO 27-17)
- GASO - L.A. Ramsby 1-yard TD run, Bass kick good, 11:56 (GASO 34-17)
- LA - Jarrod Jackson 26-yard TD pass from Davis, Artigue kick good, 11:00 (GASO 34-24)

Top passers

- GASO - Shai Werts - 6/11, 75 yards, TD
- LA - Jordan Davis - 15/26, 225 yards, 2 TD, 2 INT

Top rushers

- GASO - Wesley Fields - 23 carries, 186 yards, TD
- LA - Darius Hoggins - 2 carries, 80 yards, TD

Top receivers

- GASO - Ellis Richardson - 3 receptions, 68 yards, TD
- LA - Ryheem Malone - 6 receptions, 106 yards, TD

Top defenders

- GASO - Joshua Moon - 7 tackles
- LA - Tracy Walker - 14 tackles

Statistics	Louisiana	Appalachian State
First downs	18	27
Total yards	369	608
Rushing yards	162	357
Passing yards	207	251
Turnovers	3	0
Time of possession	27:52	32:08

=== At Appalachian State ===
Louisiana at Appalachian State– Game summary

Quarter	1	2	3	4	Total
Ragin' Cajuns	7	0	0	7	14
Mountaineers	14	21	14	14	63

at Kidd Brewer Stadium, Boone, NC

- Date: December 2
- Game time: 1:30 p.m. CST
- Game weather: 50 °F (10 °C); partly cloudy
- Game attendance: 23,411
- Referee: Jason Autrey
- TV: ESPN3

Game information

First quarter

- LA - Devin Scott 28-yard TD pass from Jordan Davis, Stevie Artigue kick good, 14:10 (LA 7-0)
- APST - Taylor Lamb 29-yard TD run, Chandler Stanton kick good, 7:39 (TIE 7-0)
- APST - Jalin Moore 3-yard TD run, Stanton kick good, 2:14 (APST 14-7)

Second quarter

- APST - Thomas Hennigan 9-yard TD pass from Lamb, Stanton kick good, 11:51 (APST 21-7)
- APST - Hennigan 33-yard TD pass from Lamb, Stanton kick good, 1:20 (APST 28-7)
- APST - Hennigan 12-yard TD pass from Lamb, Stanton kick good, 0:03 (APST 35-7)

Third quarter

- APST - Hennigan 42-yard TD pass from Lamb, Stanton kick good, 11:17 (APST 42-7)
- APST - Moore 6-yard TD run, Stanton kick good, 3:02 (APST 49-7)

Fourth quarter

- APST - Daetrich Harrington 15-yard TD run, Stanton kick good, 13:48 (APST 56-7)
- LA - Levi Lewis 14-yard TD run, Artigue kick good, 11:05 (APST 56-14)
- APST - Curtis Fitch 2-yard TD run, Stanton kick good, 3:01 (APST 63-14)

Top passers

- APST - Tyler Lamb - 17/22, 242 yards, 4 TD
- LA - Jordan Davis - 9/15, 105 yards, TD, 2 INT

Top rushers

- APST - Daetrich Harrington - 17 carries, 118 yards, TD
- LA - Jordan Davis - 11 carries, 78 yards

Top receivers

- APST - Thomas Hennigan, 5 receptions, 99 yards, 4 TD
- LA - Ryheem Malone - 2 receptions, 60 yards

Top defenders

- APST - Eric Boggs - 9 tackles, sack
- LA - Tracy Walker - 15 tackles
