= Murder of Oneal Moore =

1965 murder of an American police officer

Oneal Moore
- Born: April 23, 1931; Louisiana, U.S.
- Died: June 2, 1965 (aged 34); Varnado, Louisiana, U.S.
- Occupations: Deputy sheriff, Washington Parish Sheriff's Office
- Years active: More than one
- Known for: First African-American deputy sheriff in the parish; murdered by suspected white supremacists
- Children: 4

Oneal Moore (April 23, 1931 – June 2, 1965) was the first African-American deputy sheriff for the Washington Parish Sheriff's Office in Varnado, Louisiana. He was murdered on June 2, 1965, by alleged members of the Ku Klux Klan in a drive-by shooting, one year and a day after his landmark appointment as deputy sheriff. An Army veteran, he was 34 years old, married, and the father of four daughters.

== Events ==
The evening of June 2, 1965, Moore was driving home from work when an individual in a pickup truck shot at him and his partner, David Creed Rogers, another African-American deputy sheriff. Moore lost control of the vehicle and crashed into a tree, dying instantly from a gunshot wound to the head. Rogers suffered injuries, including to one eye, but survived the shooting and crash; he immediately broadcast a description of the vehicle, which he noted had a Confederate flag decal on its front bumper.

Two suspects were arrested in Mississippi not long afterward. One was Ernest Ray McElveen, a known white supremacist. McElveen was represented by Baton Rouge, Louisiana, attorney Osier Brown. He later also represented the two men charged with Clarence Triggs' murder the following year in 1966. The police filed no charges due to a lack of evidence and witnesses.

The cold case was reopened by the FBI several times, first in 1990, then in 2001 and 2007, but they did not bring indictments. McElveen, the prime suspect in the case, died in 2003.

The Deacons for Defense and Justice, an African-American group with a chapter organized in 1965 in Bogalusa, Louisiana, among other chapters, to protect civil rights workers, provided armed protection and support for Moore's widow and family.

== See also ==
- List of unsolved murders (1900–1979)
