= Clarence Triggs =

American construction worker (1942–1966)

- Born: 1942
- Died: July 30, 1966 (aged 24); Bogalusa, Louisiana
- Cause of death: Murder by shooting
- Occupation: bricklayer
- Known for: Veteran murdered after participating in civil rights march for voting, among cold cases reopened after 2007, but no indictments resulted

Clarence Triggs (1942 – July 30, 1966) was a married African-American bricklayer and veteran, who was murdered on July 30, 1966, in Bogalusa, Louisiana, about a month after participating in a civil rights march for voting. Two white men were arrested and indicted in the case. One was acquitted and the other never tried. Although the cold case was reopened by the FBI in the early 21st century, Triggs' murder has never been solved.

== Background ==
Triggs, a 24-year-old construction worker, had recently moved with his wife Emma to Bogalusa from Jackson, Mississippi. He worked as a bricklayer.

He had taken part in some marches organized by the Congress on Racial Equality and the Bogalusa Voters League to push for blacks to be allowed to register freely to vote in elections, after decades of being disenfranchised. Triggs was killed a month later. This was about a year after Oneal Moore, the first black deputy sheriff in Washington Parish, was shot and murdered while on patrol; his partner, deputy Creed Rodgers, was severely wounded and lost sight in one eye. Congress had passed the Voting Rights Act of 1965 to authorize federal oversight and enforcement in jurisdictions with historic under-representation of minorities in voting, but many areas of the South were resisting this change.

== Death ==
Triggs was found, shot in the head, near a wrecked car registered to the wife of Homer R. "Kingfish" Seale; the body and car were near the highway. Seale was one of the suspects arrested for the murder. According to police chief Claxton Knight, there were "no racial implications in the death." "Police insist the Triggs killing was not racially inspired."

But Royan Burris, president of the local chapter of the Deacons for Defense, said he had gone to the murder scene at 3 a.m. to tell police about witnesses having seen two white men in a car following Triggs. Burris was arrested at the scene on a charge of interfering with police, taken to the police station for booking, and released after he paid a $100 cash bail. People in the black community and some outside believed that the police were covering up the murder.

Homer R. "Kingfish" Seale and John W. Copling, Jr., both 36, were arrested August 1 on the charge of murdering Triggs; they were freed on bail. They were represented by Baton Rouge attorney Osier Brown. He also represented Ernest Ray McElveen, charged with the murder of Oneal Moore in June 1965 near Bogalusa. Seale was never tried although both he and Copling were indicted. Copling was tried first; the jury deliberated for less than an hour and acquitted him.

The details of the killing, and the link, if any, between Triggs and Seale, have never been made public. Triggs' name is listed on the Civil Rights Memorial. His case was reopened by the FBI under the Emmett Till Unsolved Civil Rights Crime Act, but has since been closed without resolution.

== See also ==
- List of unsolved murders (1900–1979)
