= WBOX-FM =

Radio station in Varnado, Louisiana

- Varnado, Louisiana; United States
- Frequency: 92.9 MHz

Programming
- Format: Country

Ownership
- Owner: Best Country Broadcasting, LLC

History
- First air date: November 1985

Technical information
- Licensing authority: FCC
- Facility ID: 6316
- Class: A
- ERP: 3,000 watts
- HAAT: 98 meters (322 ft)
- Transmitter coordinates: 30°50′27.6″N 89°50′6″W

Links
- Public license information: Public file; LMS

WBOX-FM is a radio station broadcasting on 92.9 FM in Varnado, Louisiana. The station is owned by Best Country Broadcasting, LLC, and carries a country format.

WBOX-FM is an affiliate of the LSU Sports Radio Network and carries LSU football, men's and women's basketball, and baseball games.

== History ==
WBOX-FM signed on the air in November 1985. While a sister to WBOX (920 AM), the two stations initially carried different formats, with 920 airing country music and 92.7 adopting an adult contemporary sound.

WBOX-AM-FM was sold to Bogue Chitto Communications for $325,000 in 1988; the sale made the pair sisters to four radio stations in Mississippi. Both stations changed to contemporary country formats. The station was required to move to 92.9 from 92.7 as a result of an upgrade proposal for station WQCK licensed to Clinton, Louisiana (now WBKL).

Best Country Broadcasting, owned by Ben Strickland, acquired WBOX-AM-FM for $150,000 in 2002.

On October 26, 2023, the Federal Communications Commission issued an Order to Pay or to Show Cause for WBOX-AM-FM to pay delinquent regulatory fees totaling just over $21,000 covering fiscal years 2002, 2012 through 2019, and 2022. Best Country was given sixty days to pay the past due fees or show cause why "these regulatory fees are inapplicable or should otherwise be waived or deferred." The Notice officially constitutes the initiation of a proceeding to revoke the licenses if Best Country fails to respond.
