= Tyrin Truong =

Mayor of Bogalusa, Louisiana

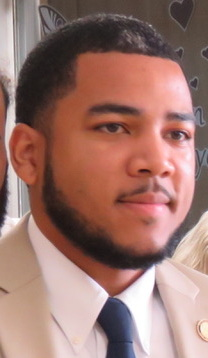
- Tyrin Truong in 2023

Mayor of Bogalusa, Louisiana
- Incumbent
- Assumed office January 8, 2023
- Preceded by: Wendy Perrette

Personal details
- Born: June 10, 1999 (age 26) Mandeville, Louisiana
- Party: Democratic
- Website: Official Website

Tyrin Truong (born June 10, 1999) is an American politician serving as the Mayor of Bogalusa, Louisiana. Elected in 2022 at the age of 23, he is the youngest mayor in the city's history.

== Early life and education ==
Tyrin Truong was born on June 10, 1999, in Mandeville, Louisiana. He graduated from Washington University in St. Louis with a degree in African and African American Studies, minoring in Political Science.

== Political career ==
In 2022, at the age of 23, Tyrin Truong was elected as the mayor of Bogalusa, defeating the two-term incumbent Wendy Perrette. Truong decided to run for office after hearing numerous complaints about the quality of life in his hometown, including crime, a lack of youth programs, and struggling businesses.

In April 2024, the state legislative auditor reported that Bogalusa was not in compliance with state audit laws, which affected the city's ability to receive state and federal funds. Truong cited the lack of proper transition from the previous administration as a significant challenge and has been working to rectify the situation.

Faced with crime and financial problems, Truong proposed dissolving the city's police department and transferring responsibilities to the Washington Parish Sheriff's Office. This proposal was part of a broader effort to reform law enforcement and address budget constraints.

In January 2025, he was arrested by the Louisiana State Police for involvement in drug trafficking and solicitation of prostitutes. In October 2025 he was indicted for malfeasance in office.

== Personal life ==
Truong has a young son. His grandfather was a Vietnamese immigrant who fought in the Vietnam War, and his mother is a U.S. Army veteran.
