= Rodney Foil =

American forestry researcher (1934–2018)

Robert Rodney Foil (August 12, 1934 – February 4, 2018) was an American forestry researcher, educator, and university administrator.

== Early life ==
Rodney Foil was born in Bogalusa, LA to Rosa Green Foil and Odell Foil. He graduated from Louisiana State University with a BS in Forestry in 1956, an MS in Forestry in 1960, and a Doctorate in Forestry from Duke University in 1964. In 1959 he married Patti Sue Thomas, with whom he had two children: Jerry and Allison. He married Rosalind Whatley Johnson in 1984.

== Career and legacy ==
Foil began his career as a commercial land management forester. He then spent eleven years on the faculty of LSU before going to Mississippi State University in 1969. There, he rose from Head of the Department of Forestry, to Dean of the School of Forest Resources, to Experiment Station Director, to Vice President of MSU's School of Agriculture, Forestry, and Veterinary Medicine.

After retiring from MSU in 1999, Foil served with the Cooperative State Research, Education, and Extension Service of the US Department of Agriculture for two years. He began overseeing the CSREES Initiative for Future Agriculture and Food Systems. Under his guidance, grants totaling more than $240 million were awarded to address high-priority agricultural problems.

In 2004, Rodney Foil was among the first inductees into the U.S. Department of Agriculture hall of fame. The 750-acre R. R. Foil Plant Science Research Center, known by many as the MSU North Farm, is also part of his legacy. The Rosalind and Rodney Foil Teamwork Award is given for exemplary collaboration efforts in MSU's Division of Agriculture, Forestry and Veterinary Medicine.
