= Snoozer Quinn =

American jazz guitarist

- Quinn in 1932 (still frame from silent film clip)

Background information
- Born: Edward Mcintosh Quinn; October 17, 1907; McComb, Mississippi, U.S.
- Died: April 21, 1949 (aged 41) New Orleans, Louisiana, U.S.
- Genres: Jazz
- Occupation: Musician
- Instrument: Guitar
- Website: www.snoozerquinn.com

Edward McIntosh "Snoozer" Quinn (October 17, 1907 – April 21, 1949) was an American jazz guitarist who was admired by his fellow musicians and later commentators but who left few recordings. He had a sophisticated chordal style including simultaneous bass / rhythm, chords in the middle register, and melody over the top, all the while with a strong sense of swing, best illustrated by his set of 1948 recordings with cornettist Johnny Wiggs recorded in hospital shortly before his early death from tuberculosis.

== Life and career ==
=== Early life ===
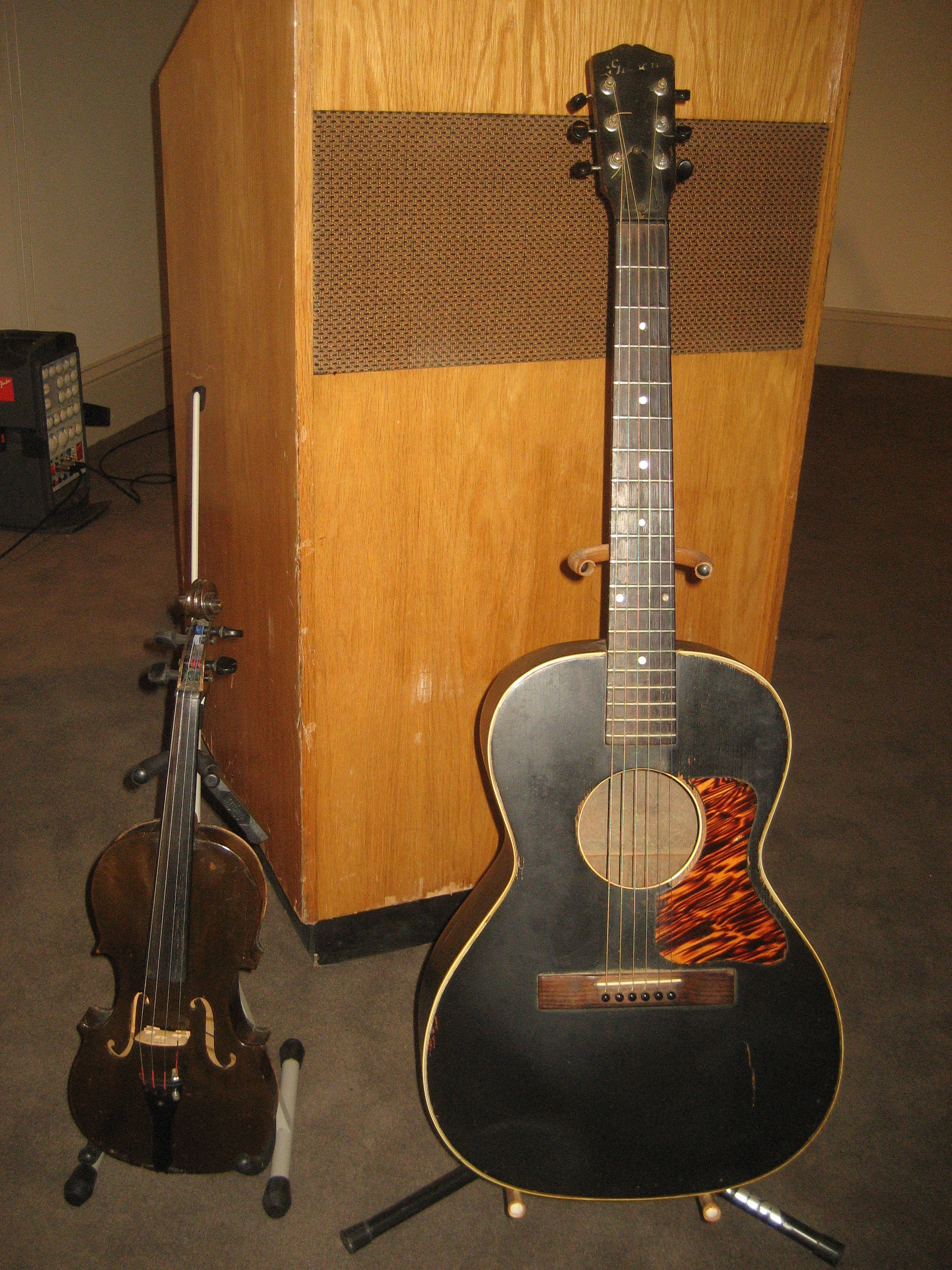
Violin and guitar owned by Snoozer Quinn

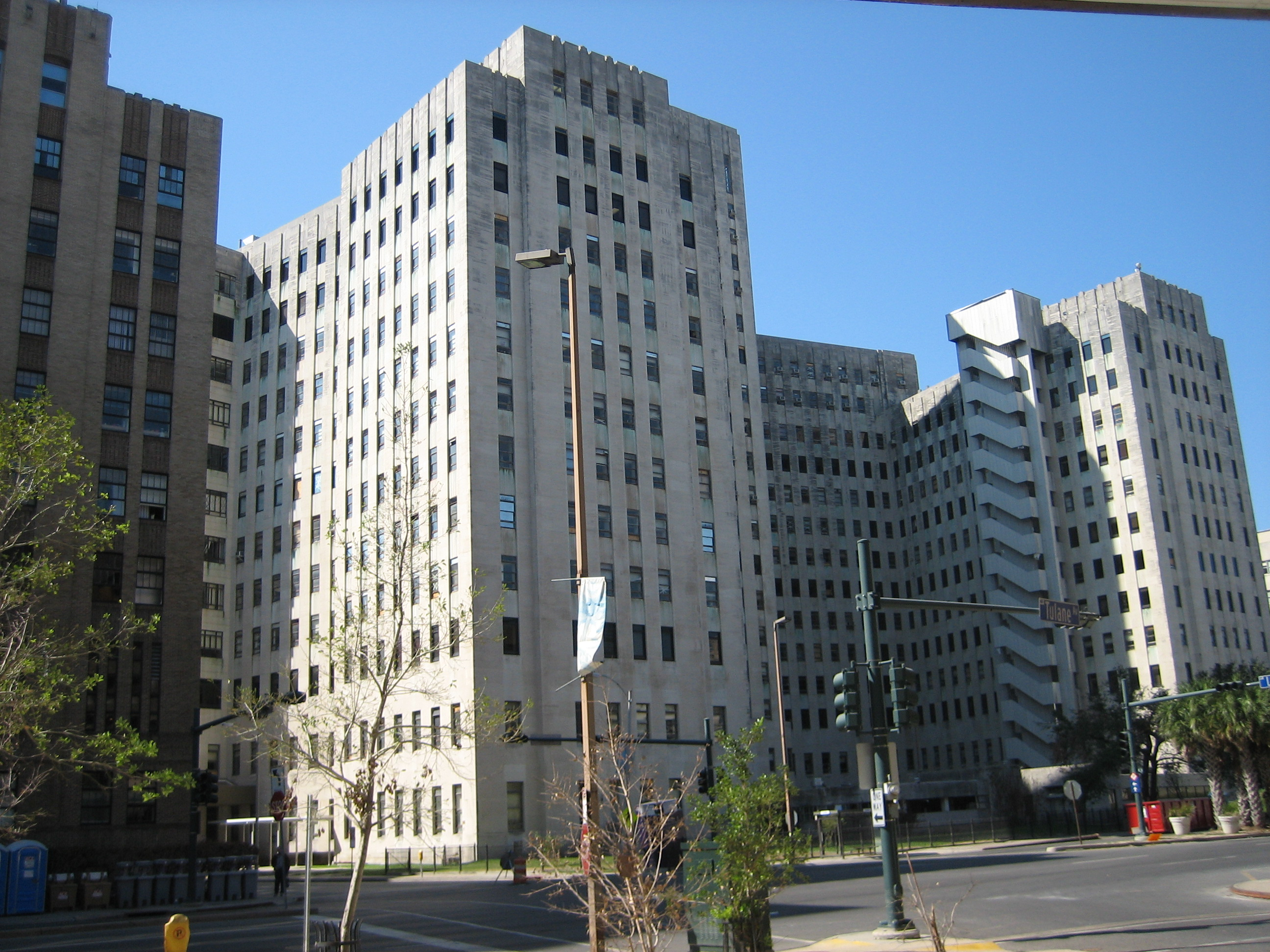
Quinn's main recordings were made from his sick bed in Charity Hospital, where he spent his final months.

Quinn was born on October 17, 1907, in Pike County, just outside of McComb, Mississippi. His family relocated to Bogalusa, Louisiana in 1911. Bogalusa was home to a musically rich community with both black and white musicians, in fact, it was not uncommon for white residents to attend dances in which the music was played by black musicians. Quinn himself was a part of a musical family with his mother, father, and brother all playing instruments. Quinn showed an exceptional talent from a very young age and was reported to play a number of instruments including: guitar, piano, banjo, mandolin, violin, and was even said to have proficiency on a number of wind instruments. Despite Quinn's association with the guitar, as a child his primary instrument was the fiddle; however, he quickly became too advanced to be taught by his childhood teacher. Throughout his childhood he took many jobs and performing around Bogalusa including playing in church and scoring for movies and vaudeville. (Hobgood, 2013, 64) He graduated from high school in 1924.

=== Early career ===
Quinn had already been working as a musician before even becoming a teenager. He joined his first jazz band, the Blanchard Orchestra, in 1920 and there he remained until 1922. He performed with the Paul English Traveling Shows and Peck's Bad Boys led by Peck Kelley, in addition to Claude Blanchard, Mart Britt, the St. Louis Rhythm Kings, and the Louisiana Ramblers. This led to him travelling in and around Mississippi and Louisiana. Sometime shortly after, he had ended up in Texas, reunited with a newly debuted Blanchard Orchestra. According to the Discography of American Recordings, Quinn recorded 4 solo sides in San Antonio, Texas in May 1928 (Snoozer's blues, Tiger rag, That'll get it and Rambling Blues) but these went unissued; after a few years in Texas and these attempted solo recordings, Quinn decided to head to New Orleans in 1928.

=== Time with Paul Whiteman ===
First, Quinn had arrived back in Bogalusa in the fall of 1928 a month before a big meeting with Paul Whiteman in New Orleans. This was Quinn's big break, their meeting went well and Whiteman hired him to be a member of his band. During this time, Quinn is said to have crossed paths with the likes of Monk Hazel, Paul Mares, and Bix Beiderbecke. In late 1928, Quinn was ordered by Whiteman to go to New York City with the rest of his band to begin rehearsals for recording sessions. During this time in New York City, Quinn gained the attention of Bee Palmer, who quickly become one of his biggest fans. According to Norman Mongan, Quinn, as Whiteman's favoured guitarist, was often chosen by the latter to accompany him to social gatherings where Quinn would be called upon to provide guitar accompaniment at no notice to any soloists on other instruments who might be around in Whiteman's social circle. There are many theories as to why Quinn only spent about a year in the Whiteman Orchestra, however the true reason is unknown.

=== Final years ===
While playing for vocalist Bing Crosby in the 1930s, Quinn was given the nickname "Snoozer". Although he did not record with Crosby, he recorded with vocalist Bee Palmer and country singer Jimmie Davis. Quinn took work throughout Louisiana and Texas as well as travelled around the United States, including spots as a featured musician in orchestras around the region and as a solo act. Once again Quinn found himself in the recording studio in 1931 with Jimmie Davis, Oscar “Buddy” Woods, and Ed Schaffer. In 1932, Quinn again travelled to New York as a member of an ensemble participating in a musical Civil War reenactment. During this time, Quinn often played with the Rice Brothers and many other groups related to the newly forming genre of western swing. Additionally, Quinn had the opportunity to meet and play with Louis Armstrong while he spent some time in Shreveport. Shortly after and through the mid-1930s, Quinn's health began to rapidly decline, this resulted in frequent visits to the hospital for a combination of tuberculosis and alcoholism. By the early 1940s, the combination of his failing health, debilitating alcoholism, and mounting debts resulted in him being dropped from the musicians union.

=== Death ===
Back in New Orleans, Quinn had been hospitalized for tuberculosis for the final time. In 1948, Johnny Wiggs brought a recording machine and his cornet to the hospital and persuaded him to play. Quinn died on April 21, 1949, at the age of 41. By the time of Quinn's death, he had been in the hospital for a period of fifteen months, the cause of death being advanced pulmonary tuberculosis. Many years passed before his performances were released by Fat Cat Jazz on his only album, The Legendary Snoozer Quinn.

== Playing style ==
Quinn's playing falls directly within the idiom of the jazz of New Orleans and the surrounding areas during the time of his life. He has been regarded by historians and his contemporaries alike as one of the best jazz guitarists to ever live. "Quinn is a finger style jazz guitar player and effortlessly incorporates jazz, blues, country, dance, and gospel music into all he plays". Quinn's style was that of a solo guitarist in a time when what was not yet marketable.

In 1983 Norman Mongan wrote:

Snoozer, who also sang and played fiddle, used the guitar in an orchestral sense, with a constant rolling bass rhythm, chords on the middle strings, and melody on the top. But he was also familiar with the more linear developments of the single-string style that Johnson [ Lonnie Johnson ] and Lang [ Eddie Lang ] propagated. He mixed these elements, and his style had something of Carl Kress's chordal airiness, mixed with a little of Oscar Aleman's incisiveness. ...[With Johnny Wiggs] his notes swing constantly, using arpeggios, full chords, and fleet treble work ... The constant beat on the bass strings almost creates an effect of two guitars.

The same author also comments:

"Nobody's Sweetheart" [from the Johnny Wiggs recordings] has an interesting insinuated modulation in the middle of his solo that moves along with great swing and drive. On the fast, happy tempo of "You Took Advantage of Me," he takes off with a virile chordal melody statement, swinging like mad. This agile plectrum technique makes him sound like a bluesier George Van Eps. His solo on "Out of Nowhere" perfectly illustrates his highly personal approach and innate sense of swing. [Note: Per other accounts, Quinn is more likely using his fingers to play the guitar in this instance, not a plectrum].
