= Vern Pullens =

American singer

Vern Pullens (born 1929 Bogalusa, Louisiana; died 2001) was an American Rockabilly and country singer.

Pullens began his career in September 1956 with Bop Crazy Baby and It's My life for Houston-based Spade Records. At the time Pullens worked as a bricklayer so could only record on the weekends. After a long absence from the studios Pullens returned in 1975 as part of a rockabilly revival.

== Discography ==
Year	Title	Label
1956	Bop Crazy Baby / It’s My Life	Spade Records
1957	Would You Be Happy / It Took One Moment	Spade Records
1960	I Sent You The Pillow / Loving You (Means More Than Life To Me) (as Vern Pullen)	Big Howdy Records
1960	Beautiful You / It Hurts Enough To Cry	Big Howdy Records
196?	Rock On Mabel / Long Gone	Unknown
1960	Country Boy’s Dream / What Am I To Do	D Records
1975	Elvis Stole My Gal / Rock On Mabel	Spade Records
1979	You Don’t Mean To Make Me Cry / Jitterbuggin‘ Baby	Rock It Records
	I Talked To An Angel; Last Nigh; Mama Don’t Allow No Boppin‘ Tonight; Old Folks Home; I Forgot To Remember To Forget	
