= Andre Jones Jr. =

American football player (born 1998)

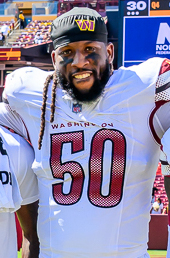
- Jones with the Washington Commanders in 2025

No. 59 – Buffalo Bills
- Position: Outside linebacker
- Roster status: Practice squad

Personal information
- Born: October 25, 1998 (age 28); Varnado, Louisiana, U.S.
- Listed height: 6 ft 5 in (1.96 m)
- Listed weight: 258 lb (117 kg)

Career information
- High school: Varnado
- College: Louisiana-Lafayette (2017–2022)
- NFL draft: 2023: 7th round, 233rd overall pick

Career history
- Washington Commanders (2023–2024); Buffalo Bills (2025); Miami Dolphins (2026); Buffalo Bills (2026–present)*
- * Offseason or practice squad member only

Awards and highlights
- Second-team All-Sun Belt (2022)

Career NFL statistics as of 2025
- Total tackles: 10
- Pass deflections: 3
- Stats at Pro Football Reference

Gerald "Andre" Jones Jr. (born October 25, 1998) is an American professional football outside linebacker for the Buffalo Bills of the National Football League (NFL). He played college football for the Louisiana Ragin' Cajuns and was selected by the Washington Commanders in the seventh round of the 2023 NFL draft.

== Early life and college ==
Jones Jr. was born on October 25, 1998, in Varnado, a village in Washington Parish, Louisiana. He attended Varnado High School, where he played football and basketball. As a senior, he recorded 78 tackles, 6 sacks, a forced fumble, and blocked punt in football, earning him All-State and All-District honors. Jones also caught 12 catches for 102 yards and two touchdowns as a tight end. He played college football as an outside linebacker for the Louisiana Ragin' Cajuns at the University of Louisiana at Lafayette from 2017 to 2022.

=== Statistics ===
College statistics
Season	Games	Tackles					Fumbles	
Season	Games	Total	Solo	Ast	TFL	Sacks	FF	FR
2017	5	9	5	4	0.5	0	0	0
2018	3	4	3	1	1	0	0	0
2019	13	42	23	19	7	2	1	0
2020	11	43	22	21	3.5	2	0	0
2021	14	60	35	25	9.5	4	2	2
2022	12	51	24	27	8.5	7.5	1	0
Career	58	209	110	99	30	15.5	4	2

== Professional career ==
Pre-draft measurables
Height	Weight	Arm length	Hand span	Wingspan	20-yard shuttle	Three-cone drill	Vertical jump	Broad jump
6 ft 4 1/2 in (1.94 m)	248 lb (112 kg)	34 1/4 in (0.87 m)	10 in (0.25 m)	6 ft 9 1/4 in (2.06 m)	4.40 s	7.13 s	31.0 in (0.79 m)	9 ft 10 in (3.00 m)
All values from NFL Combine/Pro Day

=== Washington Commanders ===
Jones was selected by the Washington Commanders in the seventh round (233rd overall) of the 2023 NFL draft. He signed his four-year rookie contract on May 12, 2023. Jones was waived by the team on August 27, 2024, and joined their practice squad the following day. On January 28, 2025, Jones signed a reserve/future contract with the Commanders. On August 27, 2025, he was released as part of final roster cuts before the start of the 2025 season.

=== Buffalo Bills ===
On August 28, 2025, Jones signed with the practice squad of the Buffalo Bills. On January 19, 2026, he signed a reserve/futures contract with Buffalo.

On August 30, 2026, Jones was waived by the Bills as a part of final roster cuts; he was re-signed to the team's practice squad the next day.

=== Miami Dolphins ===
On September 22, 2026, Jones was signed by the Miami Dolphins off of the Bills' practice squad. He was waived on October 20.

=== Buffalo Bills (second stint) ===
On October 27, 2026, Jones signed with the Buffalo Bills practice squad.
