= WBOX (AM) =

Radio station in Bogalusa, Louisiana

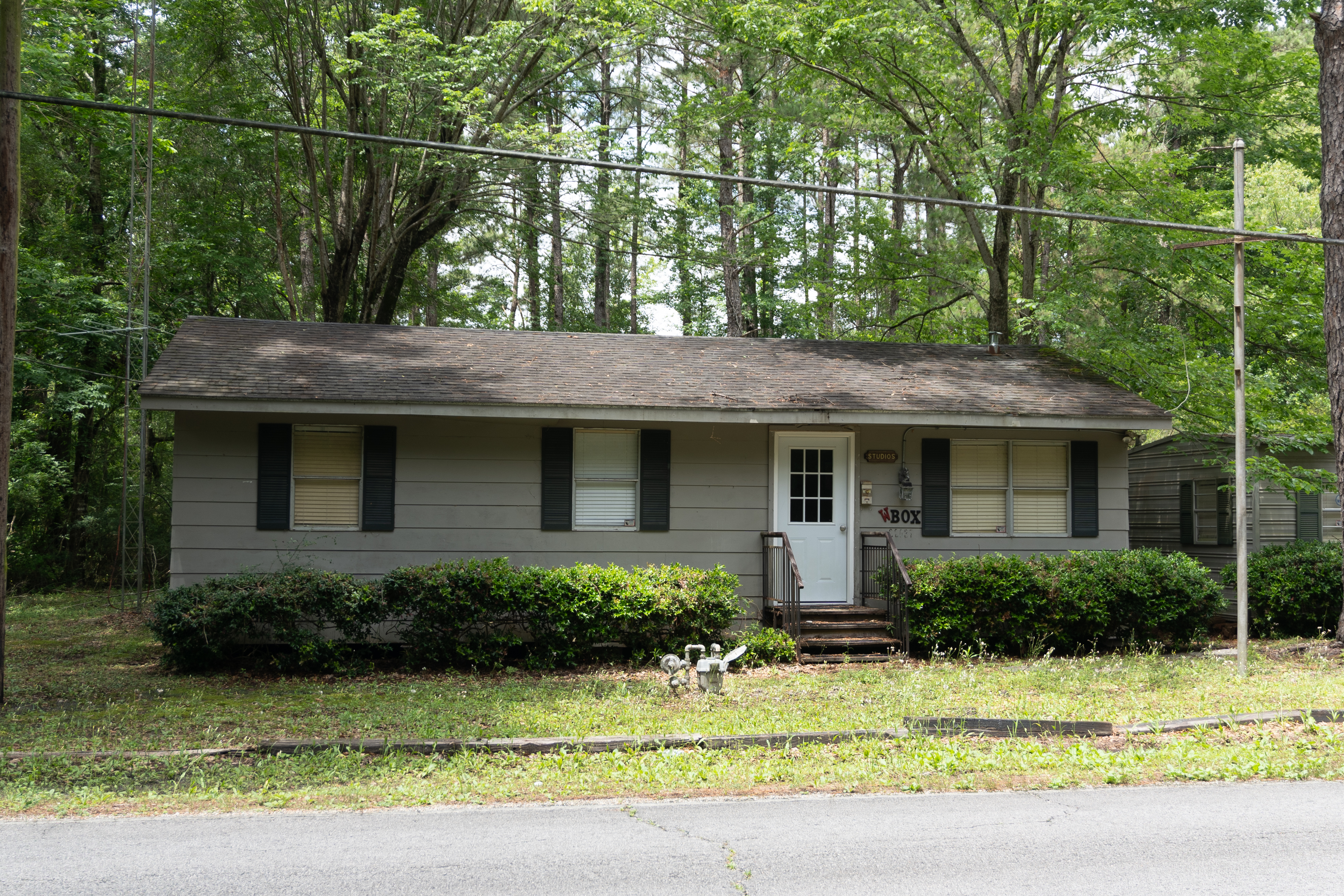
- Bogalusa, Louisiana; United States
- Frequency: 920 kHz

Programming
- Format: Country

Ownership
- Owner: Best Country Broadcasting, LLC
- Sister stations: WBOX-FM

History
- First air date: March 1, 1954
- Last air date: December 1, 2025
- Former call signs: WHXY (1954–1959)

Technical information
- Facility ID: 6317
- Class: D
- Power: 1,000 watts (daytime only)
- Transmitter coordinates: 30°50′27.6″N 89°50′6″W

WBOX was a radio station broadcasting on 920 AM in Bogalusa, Louisiana, United States, from 1954 to 2025. The station was last owned by Best Country Broadcasting, LLC, and carried a country format.

In 1965, the station was boycotted by the Ku Klux Klan during a turbulent civil rights struggle in Bogalusa, earning the station and its manager national attention but driving its ownership out of town.

== History ==
=== Early years ===
WHXY signed on the air March 1, 1954. The station was originally owned by the Bogalusa Broadcasting Corporation, controlled by Charles Holt and Dave Matison, and broadcast during the day on 920 kHz. The station was acquired by J. A. Oswald in February 1959 for $35,500; coinciding with the change of ownership, WHXY became WBOX on March 6, 1959.

In 1961, Oswald sold the station to Magic City Broadcasting Corporation, a group of businessmen from St. Louis, for $80,000.

=== Civil rights strife and KKK boycott ===
When you become a target of the Ku Klux Klan you soon learn that if there ever was a devil on the face of this earth, it lives, breathes, it functions in the cloaked evil of the leaders of the Ku Klux Klan. And you cannot compromise with the devil.

— Ralph Blumberg, acceptance speech for the 1965 RTNDA Paul White Award

In October 1964, WBOX owner Ralph Blumberg joined a group of community leaders seeking to maintain racial tranquility. He also sponsored an address that was to be given by Brooks Hays to a racially mixed audience. The Ku Klux Klan, which had a prominent role in town, did not respond kindly, intimidating organizers and forcing the address to be canceled. On March 18, 1965, six bullet holes were found in WBOX's transmitter building, which was located in a vacant field four miles northeast of town. That same day, Blumberg began broadcasting editorials claiming that the KKK was threatening an economic boycott of WBOX's advertisers. Threats were also made against Blumberg and his family, while he received harassing telephone calls "all night long". Two nights later, at a meeting of Klansmen at the Hotel Bentley in Alexandria, one speaker confirmed that the Klan was involved for "putting that station out of business", referring to WBOX. As a result, the ranks of WBOX's advertisers dwindled from 75 to just six.

In order to keep the station on the air despite losing more than 90 percent of its advertisers to the KKK boycott, broadcasters elsewhere in the United States stepped up. New York public relations consultant Mortimer Matz bought 100 commercials, each consisting of a reading of the preamble of the Constitution of the United States, to be aired on WBOX. The Greater New York Broadcasters Committee, with the support of the Louisiana Association of Broadcasters, also began raising funds to keep the station afloat.

Blumberg attempted to appease the KKK by canceling his editorials, but the intimidation continued. The boycott had the effect of driving Blumberg out of town. He moved his family to St. Louis twice, with the second time being on the advice of an FBI agent. Late in 1965, he moved to New York City and became a reporter at WCBS-TV. Blumberg testified in January 1966 before the House Un-American Activities Committee; he was awarded the 1965 Paul White Award by the Radio-Television News Directors Association and the Lee De Forest Award by the National Association for Better Radio and Television for his actions.

=== Post-boycott years ===
In late 1965—though not approved until March 1966—WBOX was sold to Pearl River Broadcasting Corporation for a financial loss; the $71,500 sale price was less than the $80,000 that Magic City had paid in 1961. The principals of Pearl River were Wayne E. Marcy, owner of an electronics company, and oil company employee William D. Womack. Womack, in a letter to the editor of Broadcasting a year later, declared that many advertising accounts, including virtually all of the local clients, had returned to WBOX. Marcy bought out Womack's interest in 1972, and Moseley-Smith Broadcasting, which owned a station in Boca Raton, Florida, acquired WBOX in 1974 for $130,000.

Northlake Audio acquired WBOX for $220,000 in 1978. Northlake was primarily owned by the Hall family, including Purvis M. Hall III, who was an announcer and program director; station manager Stephen Moses also owned five percent. Northlake received approval to relocate the transmitter to a new site and begin broadcasting at night, which went into effect in 1980. The Halls also made another major improvement: the launch of sister FM station WBOX-FM 92.7 (now 92.9), licensed to Varnado, in November 1985. The two stations initially carried different formats, with 920 airing country music and 92.7 adopting an adult contemporary sound.

WBOX-AM-FM was sold to Bogue Chitto Communications for $325,000 in 1988; the sale made the pair sisters to four radio stations in Mississippi. Both stations changed to contemporary country formats. In 1992, WBOX applied to revert to daytime-only operation. Best Country Broadcasting, owned by Ben Strickland, acquired WBOX-AM-FM for $150,000 in 2002.

On October 26, 2023, the FCC issued an Order to Pay or to Show Cause for WBOX-AM-FM to pay delinquent regulatory fees totaling just over $21,000 covering fiscal years 2002, 2012 through 2019, and 2022. Best Country was given sixty days to pay the past due fees or show cause why "these regulatory fees are inapplicable or should otherwise be waived or deferred." The Notice officially constitutes the initiation of a proceeding to revoke the licenses if Best Country fails to respond. WBOX AM ceased broadcasting on December 1, 2025, and Best Country surrendered its license for cancellation thereafter. It was cancelled on December 9, 2025.
