= Varnado, Louisiana =

- Village
- Location of Varnado in Washington Parish, Louisiana.

- Location of Louisiana in the United States
- Coordinates: 30°53′42″N 89°49′54″W
- Country: United States
- State: Louisiana
- Parish: Washington

Area
  - Total: 0.85 sq mi (2.20 km^{2})
  - Land: 0.85 sq mi (2.20 km^{2})
  - Water: 0 sq mi (0.00 km^{2})
- Elevation: 128 ft (39 m)

Population (2020)
  - Total: 330
  - Density: 388.8/sq mi (150.13/km^{2})
- Time zone: UTC-6 (CST)
  - Summer (DST): UTC-5 (CDT)
- ZIP Code: 70467
- Area code: 985
- FIPS code: 22-77910

Varnado is a village in Washington Parish, Louisiana, United States. As of the 2020 census, Varnado had a population of 330. It is part of the Bogalusa Micropolitan Statistical Area.

== Geography ==
According to the United States Census Bureau, the village has a total area of 0.9 square miles (2.3 km^{2}), all land.

== Demographics ==
Historical population
Census	Pop.	Note	%±
1920	275		—
1930	204		−25.8%
1940	315		54.4%
1950	306		−2.9%
1960	331		8.2%
1970	320		−3.3%
1980	249		−22.2%
1990	236		−5.2%
2000	342		44.9%
2010	1,461		327.2%
2020	330		−77.4%
2025 (est.)	317	▼	−3.9%
U.S. Decennial Census

As of the census of 2000, there were 342 people, 144 households, and 86 families residing in the village. The population density was 402.9 inhabitants per square mile (155.6/km^{2}). There were 163 housing units at an average density of 192.0 per square mile (74.1/km^{2}). The racial makeup of the village was 88.60% White, 9.36% African American, 0.58% Native American, and 1.46% from two or more races.

There were 144 households, out of which 27.1% had children under the age of 18 living with them, 41.0% were married couples living together, 16.7% had a female householder with no husband present, and 39.6% were non-families. 34.7% of all households were made up of individuals, and 13.2% had someone living alone who was 65 years of age or older. The average household size was 2.38 and the average family size was 3.15.

In the village, the population was spread out, with 24.9% under the age of 18, 12.0% from 18 to 24, 26.9% from 25 to 44, 22.8% from 45 to 64, and 13.5% who were 65 years of age or older. The median age was 38 years. For every 100 females, there were 74.5 males. For every 100 females age 18 and over, there were 73.6 males.

The median income for a household in the village was $26,563, and the median income for a family was $30,909. Males had a median income of $30,938 versus $21,000 for females. The per capita income for the village was $14,416. About 21.4% of families and 19.5% of the population were below the poverty line, including 23.4% of those under age 18 and 9.1% of those age 65 or over.

== Notable people ==
- Andre Jones Jr. (born 1998), American football player
