= Nick Arbuckle =

American gridiron football player (born 1993)

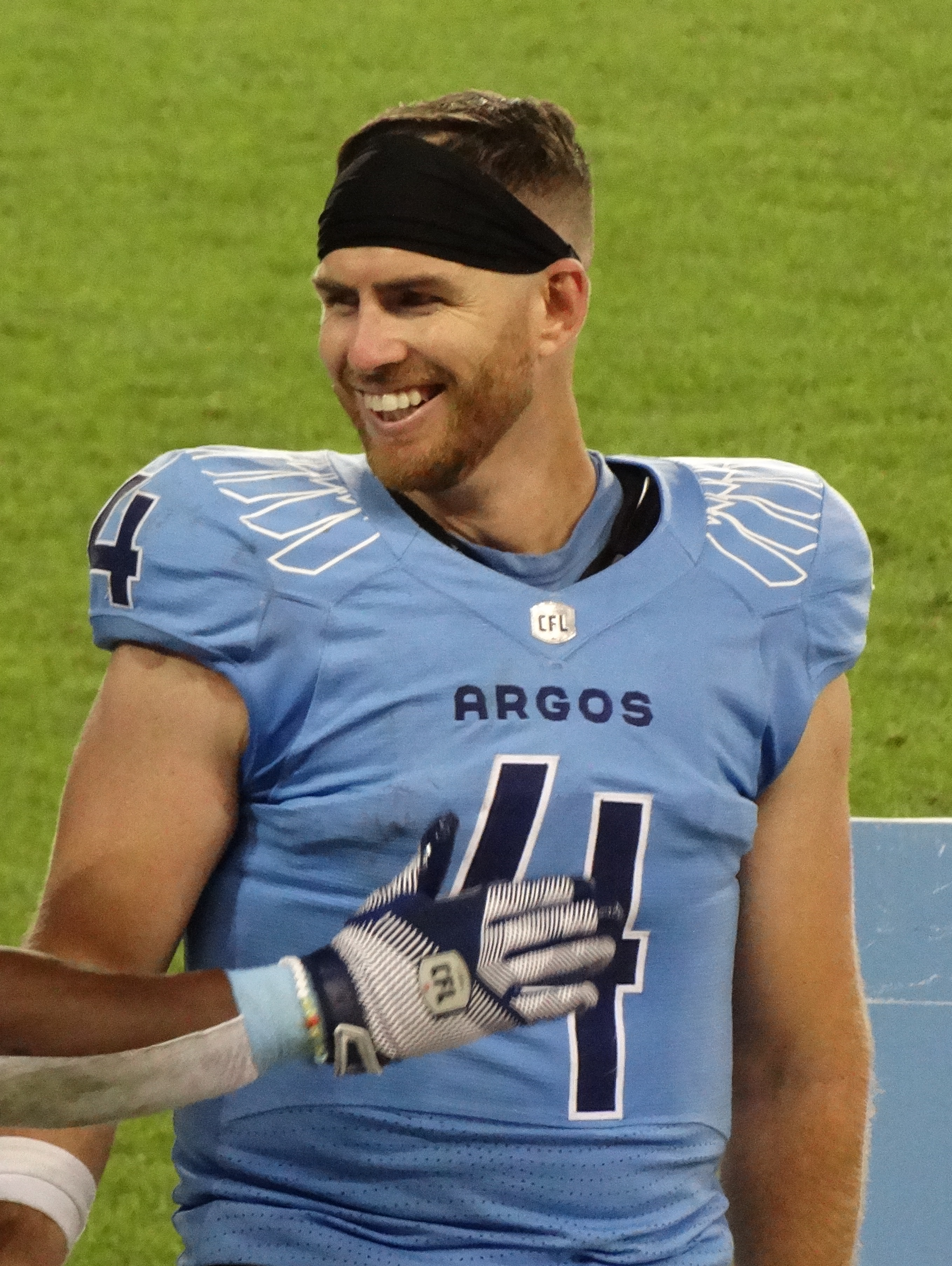
- Arbuckle with the Toronto Argonauts in 2024

No. 4 – Toronto Argonauts
- Position: Quarterback
- Roster status: Active
- CFL status: American

Personal information
- Born: October 4, 1993 (age 33); Camarillo, California, U.S.
- Listed height: 6 ft 0 in (1.83 m)
- Listed weight: 213 lb (97 kg)

Career information
- High school: St. Bonaventure
- College: Los Angeles Pierce College (2012–2013); Georgia State (2014–2015)
- NFL draft: 2016: undrafted

Career history
- 2017–2019: Calgary Stampeders
- 2020: Ottawa Redblacks*
- 2021: Toronto Argonauts
- 2021–2022: Edmonton Elks
- 2022–2023: Ottawa Redblacks
- 2024–present: Toronto Argonauts
- * Offseason or practice squad member only

Awards and highlights
- 2× Grey Cup champion (2018, 2024); Grey Cup Most Valuable Player (2024); Sun Belt Player of the Year (2015); First-team Sun Belt (2015)
- Stats at CFL.ca

Nicholas Arbuckle (born October 4, 1993) is an American professional football quarterback for the Toronto Argonauts of the Canadian Football League (CFL). He has also been a member of the Calgary Stampeders, Ottawa Redblacks, and Edmonton Elks. He is a two-time Grey Cup champion after winning as a backup with the Stampeders in 2018 and as a starter with the Argonauts in 2024 where he was named the Grey Cup MVP.

== College career ==
=== Pierce College ===
Arbuckle played two seasons at Los Angeles Pierce College. In his first collegiate game against Victor Valley, Arbuckle threw four 404 yards and five touchdowns in a 42–26 victory. In the fourth game of the season against West LA, he threw for 428 yards and six touchdowns in a 52–34 victory. In game nine against Santa Monica, Arbuckle threw for 631 yards on 43-of-77 passing for 631 yards and six touchdowns. On the season, Arbuckle threw for 40 touchdowns and 3,774 yards. He also led the Brahmas to a Patriotic Bowl victory against Mt. San Jacinto, where he threw for 345 yards and three touchdowns.

In 2013, Arbuckle threw for 2,852 yards and 26 touchdowns. He had a season high 397 passing yards and five touchdowns against Santa Barbara in a 53–42 victory. Arbuckle led the Pacific Conference in the California Community College Athletic Association (CCCAA), with 259.3 passing yards per game. For the second consecutive season, Arbuckle led Pierce College to a Bowl game victory. In the American Division Championship Bowl game against Chaffey College, he threw for 313 yards and three touchdowns. In two seasons, Arbuckle accumulated 73 total touchdowns and threw for 6,626 yards.

=== Georgia State ===
On December 6, 2013, Arbuckle committed to Georgia State. The Panthers, were in their second season at the NCAA Division I Football Bowl Subdivision (FBS) level, and fifth overall, including a 0–12 record in 2013 season.

Arbuckle won the starting quarterback job in January 2014. In his Panthers debut, Arbuckle threw for 413 yards and four touchdowns in a 38–37 victory over Abilene Christian. In game five against Louisiana, Arbuckle did not start due to a violation of team's academic attendance policy. On the season, Arbuckle appeared in all 12 games (11 starts) and threw for 3,283 yards and 23 touchdowns. Though the Panthers finished the season 1–11, Arbuckle was named Sun Belt All-New Comer and was named honorable mention all-conference. He led the Sun Belt in passing yards and passing yards per game. He broke Georgia State's season record for passing yards, touchdown passes, completions, total offense and touchdown responsibility. After just one season, he led the Panthers in career passing yards, touchdown passes and completions.

In 2015, Arbuckle set a Sun Belt record 4,368 passing yards along with school records in completions (307) and touchdowns (28). He also became the first Georgia State football player in school history to be named the conference player of the year. After a 2–6 start, Arbuckle led the Panthers to four consecutive wins, earning them their first bowl game appearance in school history in the 2015 Cure Bowl.

Arbuckle finished his career with 7,651 passing yards and 51 touchdowns. In 2024, Arbuckle was named to the Georgia State Athletics Hall of Fame.

== Professional career ==
Pre-draft measurables
Height	Weight	Arm length	Hand span	Wingspan	40-yard dash	10-yard split	20-yard split	20-yard shuttle	Three-cone drill	Vertical jump	Broad jump
6 ft 0 in (1.83 m)	225 lb (102 kg)	31 1/8 in (0.79 m)	9 1/8 in (0.23 m)	6 ft 5 3/8 in (1.97 m)	5.23 s	1.69 s	2.96 s	4.65 s	7.27 s	27.0 in (0.69 m)	8 ft 11 in (2.72 m)
All values from Pro Day

After going undrafted in the 2016 NFL draft, Arbuckle spent mini-camp with the Pittsburgh Steelers of the NFL.

=== Calgary Stampeders ===
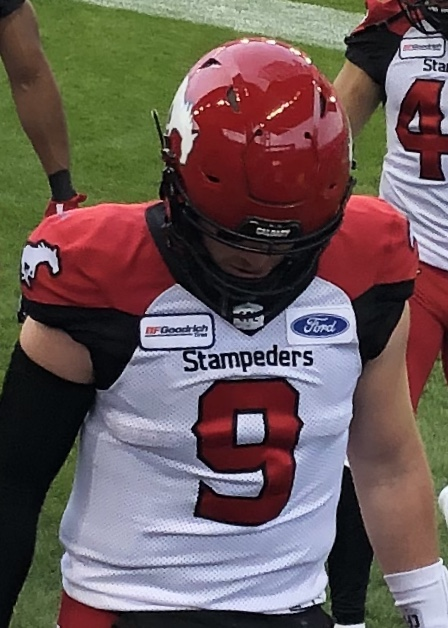
Arbuckle with the Calgary Stampeders in 2019

Arbuckle signed with the Calgary Stampeders in March 2017. He quickly became the Stampeders' backup quarterback behind Bo Levi Mitchell. Arbuckle played sparingly in 2018, completing 17 of 25 pass attempts for 144 yards with one touchdown: He also ran for 5 touchdowns as a short-yardage quarterback. Arbuckle led the Stamps to an improbable come-from-behind victory in Week 3 of the 2019 season after Bo Levi Mitchell left with a shoulder injury. Mitchell was subsequently placed on the six-game injured reserve, making Arbuckle the interim-starting quarterback. Arbuckle led the Stamps to an impressive 37–10 victory the following week over conference rivals the Saskatchewan Roughriders. The Stamps won four of their seven matches with Arbuckle under centre, before Mitchell returned to the starting lineup for the Labour Day game. He finished the season having completed 174 of 238 pass attempts (73.1%) for 2,103 yards with 11 touchdowns and five interceptions.

=== Ottawa Redblacks (first stint) ===
On January 3, 2020, Arbuckle was traded to the Ottawa Redblacks for a third-round pick and another conditional pick in the 2020 CFL draft. After a lengthy negotiation, he re-signed with Ottawa on January 31, 2020, to a two-year contract and triggered the conditional draft pick trade that saw Ottawa and Calgary swap first-round draft picks in the 2020 draft. On January 31, 2021, only a few hours after being released by the Toronto Argonauts, veteran quarterback Matt Nichols signed with the Ottawa Redblacks, who subsequently released Arbuckle.

=== Toronto Argonauts (first stint) ===
On February 1, 2021, it was announced that Arbuckle had signed with the Toronto Argonauts. He made his first start with the Argonauts in week 3 of the 2021 season where he completed 23 passes out of 32 attempts for 310 yards and one touchdown in a win against the Winnipeg Blue Bombers on August 21, 2021. Arbuckle started in the next three games for the Argos, winning once, before being replaced as the starting quarterback by veteran McLeod Bethel-Thompson.

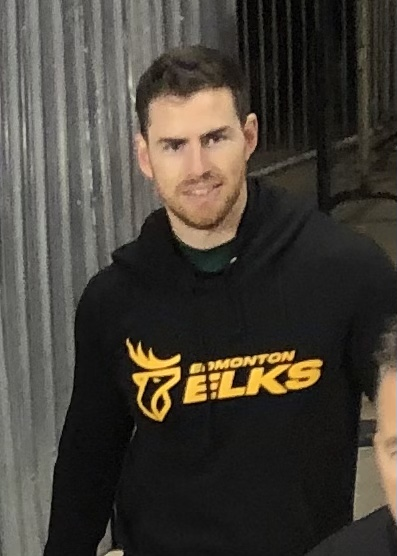
Arbuckle with the Edmonton Elks in 2021

=== Edmonton Elks ===
On October 26, 2021, Arbuckle was traded to the Edmonton Elks in exchange for a third-round pick in the 2022 CFL draft and the rights to former Ole Miss quarterback Chad Kelly from Edmonton's negotiation list. On November 1, 2021, the Elks announced they had signed Arbuckle to a contract extension through the 2022 season. In early January 2022 the Elks and Arbuckle modified the terms of his contract, with a reported salary of $328,000, a housing allowance of $12,000, and a signing bonus of $100,000. Arbuckle and the Elks struggled to begin the 2022 season, losing their first three games which resulted in Arbuckle being benched in favour of rookie Canadian quarterback Tre Ford and also ceding snaps to Kai Locksley. Arbuckle played in five games for the Elks, completing 74 of 115 pass attempts (64.4%) for 892 yards with two touchdowns and eight interceptions.

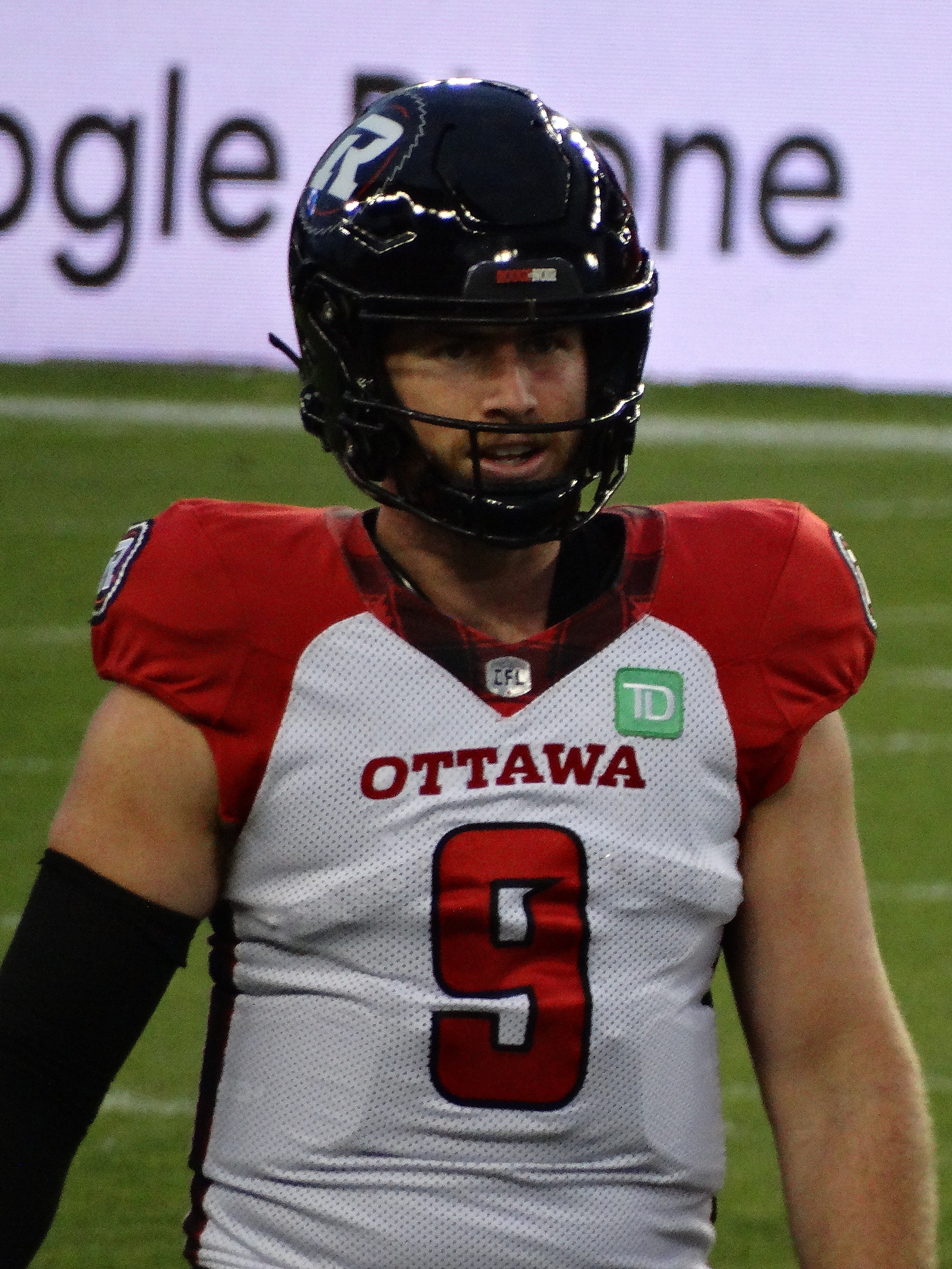
Arbuckle with the Ottawa Redblacks in 2023

=== Ottawa Redblacks (second stint) ===
On July 11, 2022, it was announced that Arbuckle had been traded to the Redblacks in exchange for a fourth-round selection in the 2023 CFL draft. Arbuckle had been acquired by Ottawa in order to compete with Caleb Evans for the starting role while veteran Jeremiah Masoli recovered from a leg injury. Caleb Evans started the first five games after Arbuckle arrived in Ottawa, however with the team having only one victory in nine games head coach Paul LaPolice named Nick Arbuckle as Ottawa's starting quarterback for the club's Week 12 match against his former team Edmonton. Arbuckle completed 21 of 32 pass attempts for 219 yards and was able to guide the Redblacks to their second win of the season. Arbuckle continued as the Redblacks starting quarterback for most of the remainder of the season, however the team saw little success and finished last place in the league with only four wins and 14 losses. On February 5, 2023, nine days before becoming a free agent, Arbuckle and Ottawa agreed on a one-year contract extension. Originally it was expected that he would serve as the backup quarterback in 2023 behind Masoli, however Masoli was not healthy at the start of the campaign, so Arbuckle was announced as the team's starting quarterback. Arbuckle started the first two games of the season, but was benched in the second quarter of the team's second contest and was replaced Tyrie Adams. He became a free agent upon the expiry of his contract on February 13, 2024.

=== Toronto Argonauts (second stint) ===
==== 2024 ====
After remaining unsigned for months when he became a free agent, Arbuckle contemplated retirement and beginning a coaching career. However, on May 19, 2024, it was announced that he had signed with the Toronto Argonauts, following the 9-game suspension of the team's incumbent starting quarterback, Chad Kelly. Arbuckle began the 2024 season as the backup behind Cameron Dukes. In week 7 against the Hamilton Tiger-Cats, down 27–10, he replaced Dukes midway through the fourth quarter where he completed eight of 14 pass attempts for 118 yards with one touchdown and one interception in the 27–24 loss. In the next game against the Winnipeg Blue Bombers, Dukes was pulled early, in the second quarter, and Arbuckle entered the game. He struggled to move the ball, as he completed 12 of 22 passes for 87 yards, but the Argonauts had an interception return touchdown that made the difference in the 16–14 overtime victory against the Blue Bombers.

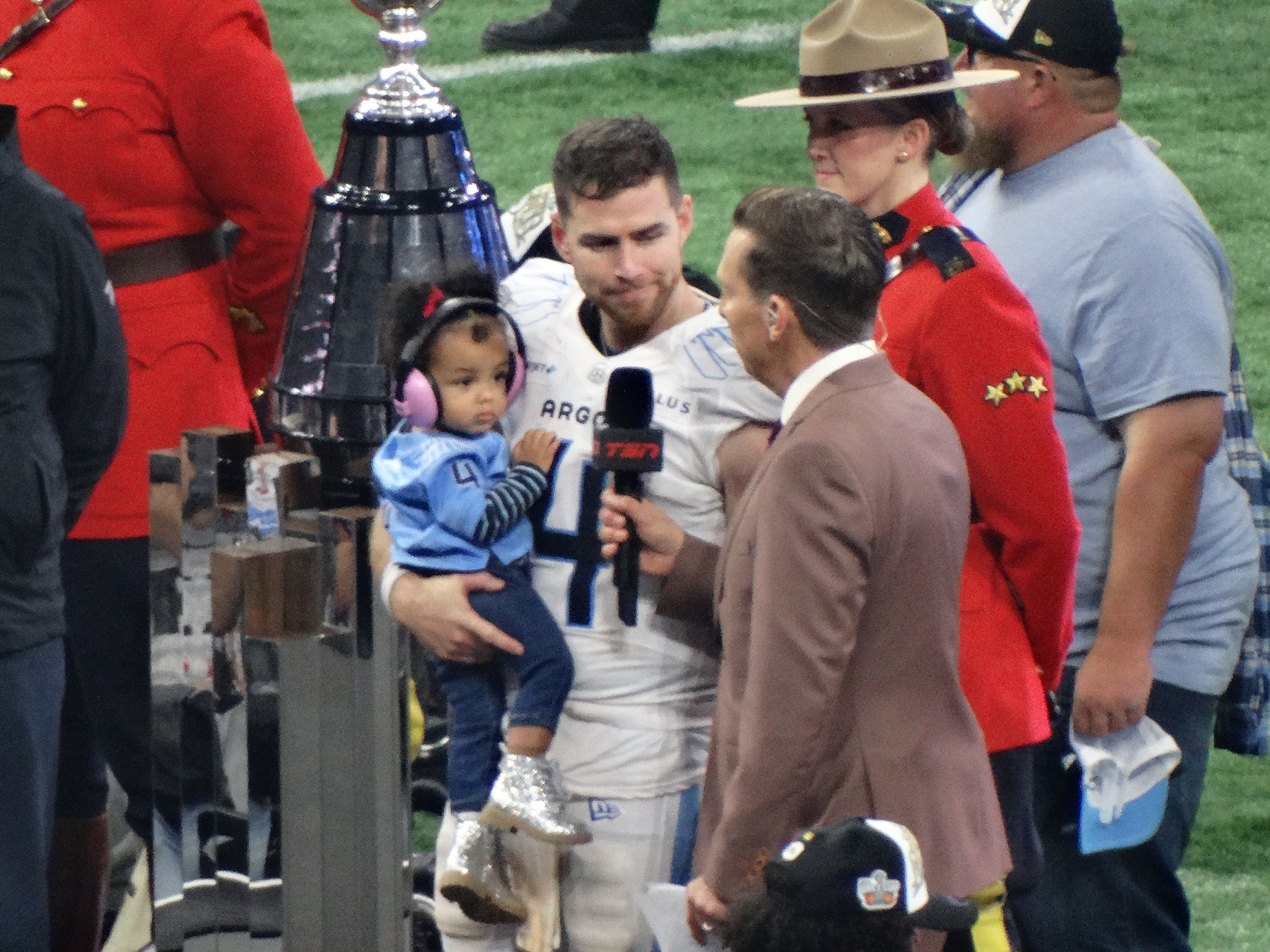
Arbuckle accepting the Grey Cup Most Valuable Player award at the 111th Grey Cup.

With Dukes nursing a leg injury in week 10, Arbuckle was named the starter for the team's ninth game of the season against the Calgary Stampeders. He completed 18 of 26 pass attempts for 181 yards with one touchdown and one interception in the 39–25 victory over the Stampeders. In the team's next game, Kelly returned from suspension and the team's incumbent third-stringer, Bryan Scott, was released while Arbuckle was retained. Arbuckle saw minimal playing time as Kelly remained healthy and effective for the remainder of the regular season. In the last game of the regular season, a meaningless game in the standings, Arbuckle finished the game completing five of seven passes for 40 yards in the overtime loss to the Edmonton Elks.

Arbuckle was the primary backup in the playoffs, but did not see playing time in the East Semi-Final victory over the Redblacks. However, in the East Final against the Montreal Alouettes, Kelly suffered a severe leg injury late in the third quarter and Arbuckle entered the game with the Argonauts scoring a field goal on the next play to make the score 27–16. He completed five of eight pass attempts for 70 yards and led a game-clinching drive at the end of the game to lead the Argonauts to a 30–28 victory. Shortly after the game, Arbuckle was named the starting quarterback for the 111th Grey Cup. In that game, he completed 26 of 37 pass attempts for 252 yards, two touchdowns, and two interceptions in the 41–24 victory over the Winnipeg Blue Bombers. Arbuckle was named the Grey Cup Most Valuable Player.

==== 2025 ====
As a pending free agent, Arbuckle signed a contract extension with the Argonauts on February 4, 2025. Due to Kelly's continued recovery from his injury, Arbuckle started the majority of the Argonauts' games in 2025; though the team went just 5–10 with Arbuckle as a starter, he set career highs in virtually every statistical category, throwing for 4,370 yards, 26 touchdowns and 15 interceptions and posting a 103.4 passer rating, all of which were top 5 in the CFL for that season.

=== 2026 ===
After Kelly returned from his injury, Arbuckle returned to his role as the team's backup under new head coach Mike Miller.

== Career statistics ==
=== CFL ===
Legend
	Grey Cup MVP
	Won the Grey Cup
**Bold**	Career high

==== Regular season ====
Year	Team	Games			Passing								Rushing			
Year	Team	GP	GS	Record	Cmp	Att	Pct	Yds	Y/A	TD	Int	Rtg	Att	Yds	Avg	TD
2018	CGY	18	0	—	17	25	68.0	144	5.8	1	0	96.1	35	73	2.1	5
2019	CGY	18	7	4–3	174	238	73.1	2,103	8.8	11	5	106.5	27	76	2.8	4
2020	OTT	Season cancelled														
2021	TOR	7	4	2–2	96	153	62.7	1,158	7.6	5	6	80.5	17	25	1.5	2
2021	EDM	0	0	—	DNP											
2022	EDM	5	3	0–3	74	115	64.3	892	7.8	2	8	64.8	3	9	3.0	0
2022	OTT	12	8	3–5	217	308	70.5	2,400	7.8	4	6	89.5	15	65	4.3	2
2023	OTT	18	2	0–2	47	78	60.3	461	5.9	0	4	55.6	3	15	5.0	0
2024	TOR	18	1	1–0	65	100	65.0	799	8.0	4	3	90.4	5	10	2.0	0
2025	TOR	15	15	5–10	365	504	72.4	4,370	8.7	26	15	103.4	45	161	3.6	2
2026	TOR	18	1	0–1	79	107	73.8	857	8.0	5	4	97.0	18	56	3.1	3
Career		129	41	15–26	1,134	1,628	69.7	13,182	8.1	58	51	92.7	169	490	2.9	18

==== Postseason ====
Year	Team	Games			Passing								Rushing			
Year	Team	GP	GS	Record	Cmp	Att	Pct	Yds	Y/A	TD	Int	Rtg	Att	Yds	Avg	TD
2018	CGY	2	0	—									4	8	2.0	0
2019	CGY	1	0	—									3	8	2.7	0
2024	TOR	3	1	1–0	31	45	68.9	325	7.2	2	2	85.9	2	11	5.5	0
Career		6	1	1–0	31	45	68.9	325	7.3	2	2	85.9	9	27	3.0	0

=== College ===
Year	Team	Games			Passing								Rushing			
Year	Team	GP	GS	Record	Cmp	Att	Pct	Yds	Y/A	TD	Int	Rtg	Att	Yds	Avg	TD
2012	Pierce College	11	10	8–2	250	373	67.0	3,774	10.1	40	16	178.8	70	158	2.3	4
2013	Pierce College	11	11	9–2	224	337	59.4	2,852	7.6	26	13	138.8	71	89	1.3	3
2014	Georgia State	12	11	1–10	259	429	60.4	3,283	7.7	23	17	134.4	73	10	0.1	2
2015	Georgia State	13	13	6–7	307	486	63.2	4,368	9.0	28	12	152.7	61	−95	−1.6	6
FBS career		25	24	7–17	566	915	61.9	7,651	8.4	51	29	144.2	134	−85	−0.6	8
