= List of Georgia State Panthers football seasons =

This is a list of seasons completed by the Georgia State Panthers football team of the National Collegiate Athletic Association (NCAA) Division I Football Bowl Subdivision, representing Georgia State University in the East Division of the Sun Belt Conference. Georgia State has played their home games at Center Parc Stadium in Atlanta, Georgia since 2017.

== Seasons ==
Year	Team	Overall	Conference	Standing	Bowl/playoffs	Coaches^{#}	AP^{°}
Bill Curry (NCAA Division I FCS independent) (2010–2011)
2010	Panthers	6–5					
2011	Panthers	3–8					
Bill Curry (Colonial Athletic Association) (2012)
2012	Panthers	1–10	1–7	T–9th			
Bill Curry:		10–23	1–7				
Trent Miles (Sun Belt Conference) (2013–2016)
2013	Panthers	0–12	0–7	8th			
2014	Panthers	1–11	0–8	11th			
2015	Panthers	6–7	5–3	4th	L Cure Bowl		
2016	Panthers	3–9 (Note: Trent Miles was fired after the first 10 games of the 2016 season. Tim Lappano served as interim head coach for the final two games.)	2–6	9th			
Trent Miles:		10–39 (Note: Record includes the final two games of the 2016 season, coached by interim coach Tim Lappano, where the Panthers finished 1–1.)	7–24				
Shawn Elliott (Sun Belt Conference) (2017–2023)
2017	Panthers	7–5	5–3	4th	W Cure Bowl		
2018	Panthers	2–10	1–7	5th (East)			
2019	Panthers	7–6	4–4	3rd (East)	L Arizona Bowl		
2020	Panthers	6–4	4–4	3rd (East)	W LendingTree Bowl		
2021	Panthers	8–5	6–2	T–2nd (East)	W Camellia Bowl		
2022	Panthers	4–8	3–5	T–4th (East)			
2023	Panthers	7–6	3–5	T–5th (East)	W Famous Idaho Potato Bowl		
Shawn Elliott:		41–44	26–30				
Dell McGee (Sun Belt Conference) (2024–present)
2024	Panthers	3–9	1–7	7th (East)			
Dell McGee:		3–9	1–7				
Total:		64–115 (.358)					
National championship Conference title Conference division title or championship game berth
^{†}Indicates Bowl Coalition, Bowl Alliance, BCS, or CFP / New Years' Six bowl.; ^{#}Coaches Poll.; ^{°}AP Poll.
