= Colton High School (California) =

Coordinates: 34°04′11″N 117°20′03″W

Location
- 777 W Valley Blvd; Colton, San Bernardino County, California 92324; United States

Information
- Type: Public
- Opened: 1895
- School district: Colton Joint Unified School District
- Principal: Colton Benoit
- Teaching staff: 93.49 (FTE)
- Grades: 9-12
- Enrollment: 1,768 (2023-2024)
- Student to teacher ratio: 18.91
- Colors: Crimson and Gold
- Athletics conference: CIF Southern Section; Sunkist League
- Mascot: Yellowjacket
- Rival: Grand Terrace
- Newspaper: Pepper Bough
- Website: Colton High School

Colton High School is an American public high school in Colton, California. It is located just north of Interstate 10 at Rancho Avenue. Colton High School opened in 1895 as the first High School of the Colton School District. It is one of five High Schools in the district.

The school draws students from the city of Colton, as well as Grand Terrace and a small section of San Bernardino. The school is identified as a national AVID demonstration school, and was named a 2011 AP District of the Year in the midsize category by the College Board. Out of 1240 high schools in California, Colton ranks 1139 placing it in lowest 10%.

== Sports ==
In the 2010 Fall football season, the Yellowjackets won the CIF Championship, the first time since 1979.

In 2022, 12 former Colton High School football players, including Shareece Wright, sued the Colton Joint Unified School District and former athletic trainer Tiffany Strauss-Gordon for sexual assault.

== Notable athletes ==
- Anthony Hamilton (soccer) of the Chivas USA
- Rich Dauer of the Baltimore Orioles
- Jay Dahl Major League Baseball pitcher for Houston Colt 45s
- Kevinn Pinkney of the Boston Celtics
- Allen Bradford of the Seattle Seahawks
- Daniel Sorensen of the Kansas City Chiefs
- Shareece Wright of the Baltimore Ravens
- Nat Berhe of the New York Giants
- Jimmy Smith of the Baltimore Ravens
- Ken Hubbs was baseball's 1962 National League Rookie of the Year for the Chicago Cubs
- Tyler Ervin of the Green Bay Packers
- Jorge Ruvalcaba soccer player for Standard Liège
