= Jimmy Smith (cornerback) =

American football player (born 1988)

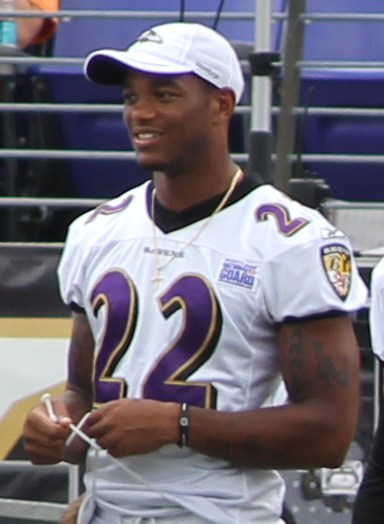
- Smith during practice at M&T Bank Stadium in 2011

No. 22
- Position: Cornerback

Personal information
- Born: July 26, 1988 (age 38); Fontana, California, U.S.
- Listed height: 6 ft 2 in (1.88 m)
- Listed weight: 210 lb (95 kg)

Career information
- High school: Colton (Colton, California)
- College: Colorado (2006–2010)
- NFL draft: 2011: 1st round, 27th overall pick

Career history
- Baltimore Ravens (2011–2021)

Awards and highlights
- Super Bowl champion (XLVII); First-team All-Big 12 (2010)

Career NFL statistics
- Total tackles: 365
- Sacks: 3
- Forced fumbles: 3
- Fumble recoveries: 2
- Interceptions: 14
- Defensive touchdowns: 3
- Stats at Pro Football Reference

James Michael Smith (born July 26, 1988) is an American former professional football player who was a cornerback in the National Football League (NFL). He was selected by the Baltimore Ravens with the 27th pick in the 2011 NFL draft. He played college football for the Colorado Buffaloes.

Smith spent his entire 11 season career with the Ravens, winning Super Bowl XLVII during his second season with the team. A backup during his first two seasons, he became a starter for the team in 2013. He played with the Ravens until 2021.

== Early life ==
Born in Fontana, California, Smith grew up in a single-floor home in Colton, California, which is about 60 miles east of Los Angeles. The neighborhood Smith lived in was notoriously bad. "It's a rough neighborhood," said Smith. "A lot of gangs. A lot of gang violence. A lot of people get shot and killed all the time." However, Smith was able to shrug this off and excel at football from an early age.

Smith attended Colton High School in his hometown of Colton, CA, where he was a three-year letterman in football. He garnered honorable mention all-league accolades on defense as a sophomore starting at safety, when he had 45 tackles and four interceptions on the season-his first year playing football. As a junior, he was named first-team all-league and second-team all-county on defense. He recorded 30 catches for 600 yards and four touchdowns on offense, and at his cornerback spot, he tallied 57 tackles, a forced fumble, a fumble recovery, an interception and eight passes broken up. In his final year, he was first-team All-Southeastern Conference on both offense (wide receiver) and defense (cornerback). He was named first-team all-county and his team's most improved player. On offense, he had 53 receptions for 1,123 yards and 14 touchdowns, averaging 21.2 yards per catch, while defensively, he totaled 47 tackles, two forced fumbles, one fumble recovery, two interceptions and 15 pass deflections. He also averaged 36 yards on punt returns with one touchdown. Under coach Harold Strauss, his team went a combined 30–6 in his three years playing football: 9–3 as a senior, 10–2 as a junior and 11–1 as a sophomore; Colton advanced to the second round of the playoffs each year. Smith also lettered in basketball and track & field at Colton, earning a combined seven letters between the two.

== College career ==
Smith was another surprise out of Dan Hawkins's transition class of 2006. Like Nate Solder, Smith was a middle of the pack recruit out of his home state of California (No. 57 Athlete by Rivals and unranked as a corner by ESPN) that grew into a first round prospect on a series of very mediocre Colorado teams. During the 2007 season Smith firmly established himself as a contributor, a special teams star, and as part of the secondary depth. By far the biggest play of his 2007 season came against Nebraska. With Colorado trailing by 11, Smith picked off a Joe Ganz pass and returned it 31 yards for a touchdown. It sparked a 34-0 run, and Colorado would go on to win 65-51 over Nebraska.

Smith built on his redshirt freshman year effort, playing in 10 games for CU and starting the final three at corner, a position he'd hold through the rest of his CU career. Again Smith closed the season with fireworks against Nebraska, sniffing out an ill-advised fake field goal attempt by the Huskers, intercepting the lateral and taking it 58 yards for a touchdown. Things continued to progress well for Smith who took over the starting corner spot full-time at the start of his junior season, holding it through his last game at CU; in that 2 year, 24 game run he gave up an average of 1 completion a game. During that span Smith made quite a name for himself totaling 70 tackles in both seasons defending 15 passes and posing such a threat to offenses he was thrown at a mere 20 times as a senior in man coverage. In that time Smith was honored as a two-time All-Big 12 nominee, the Dave Jones award winner, and was named to the Thorpe Award watch list.

== Professional career ==
=== Pre-draft ===
As a top cornerback prospect, Smith was one of 56 collegiate defensive backs to attend the annual NFL Scouting Combine in Indianapolis, Indiana. Smith completed all of the combine drills and finished sixth among defensive backs in the 40-yard dash, tied for third in the bench press, and finished 12th amongst his position group in the broad jump. On March 9, 2011, Smith attended Colorado's pro day, along with Nate Solder, Jalil Brown, and Scotty McKnight among others. He opted to stand on the majority of his combine numbers and only performed the vertical jump (37"), long shuttle (11.42s), and positional drills. His overall performance was perceived as mediocre by scouts, as he had a few dropped passes and appeared to quickly tire during his workout. Smith attended private workouts and meetings with 12 teams that included the Detroit Lions, Minnesota Vikings, New York Jets, San Diego Chargers, Oakland Raiders, Washington Redskins, Cincinnati Bengals, Baltimore Ravens, Cleveland Browns, and Philadelphia Eagles.

At the conclusion of the pre-draft process, Smith was projected to be a first round pick by NFL draft experts and analysts. It was reported multiple teams removed Smith entirely off their draft boards due to his history of arrests, failed drug tests, and suspected maturity issues. Multiple teams stated Smith failed to accept responsibility for his actions during interviews with teams at the NFL combine. He was ranked as the third best cornerback prospect in the draft by NFLDraftScout.com and ESPN analyst Mel Kiper Jr. and was ranked the fourth best cornerback by NFL analyst Mike Mayock.

Pre-draft measurables
Height	Weight	Arm length	Hand span	Wingspan	40-yard dash	10-yard split	20-yard split	20-yard shuttle	Three-cone drill	Vertical jump	Broad jump	Bench press
6 ft 2 1/4 in (1.89 m)	211 lb (96 kg)	32 1/4 in (0.82 m)	9 3/4 in (0.25 m)	6 ft 5 5/8 in (1.97 m)	4.47 s	1.59 s	2.63 s	4.06 s	6.93 s	37.0 in (0.94 m)	10 ft 3 in (3.12 m)	24 reps
All values from NFL Combine/Pro Day

=== 2011 ===
The Baltimore Ravens selected Smith in the first round (27th overall) of the 2011 NFL draft. He was the third cornerback selected in 2011, behind LSU's Patrick Peterson and Nebraska's Prince Amukamara.

On July 29, 2011, the Baltimore Ravens signed Smith to a four-year, $7.46 million contract that includes $6.06 million and a signing bonus of $3.92 million.

Smith was unable to develop at the expected rate due to the lockout forcing teams to cancel organized team activities and minicamp. Throughout training camp, Smith competed for snaps and began the regular season as the backup behind starting cornerbacks Lardarius Webb and Cary Williams.

He made his professional regular season debut in the Baltimore Ravens' season-opening 35–7 victory against the Pittsburgh Steelers. During the opening kickoff, Smith suffered an ankle injury. He missed four games (Weeks 2-6) due to the high ankle sprain and was unable to return until Week 7. On November 20, 2011, Smith made three solo tackles, a pass deflection, and recorded his first career interception off an errant pass by Andy Dalton during the 31–24 victory over the Cincinnati Bengals. He returned the ball 16-yards before having it stripped from his grasp by Bengals' wide receiver Jerome Simpson, but it was subsequently recovered by Ravens' linebacker Brendon Ayanbadejo. On December 4, 2011, Smith earned his first career start and recorded one tackle, a pass break up, and an interception during a 24–10 victory at the Cleveland Browns. He finished his rookie regular season with 20 solo tackles, eight pass deflections, and two interceptions in 12 games and three starts.

The Baltimore Ravens finished atop the AFC North with a 12-4 record. On January 15, 2012, Smith played in his first career playoff game and recorded two combined tackles and recovered a fumble by Texans' wide receiver Jacoby Jones on a punt return during their 20–13 win against the Houston Texans. The following week, he started his first career playoff game and made a tackle, broke up a pass, and intercepted Tom Brady in the end zone after it was tipped by teammate Bernard Pollard in the fourth quarter of the Ravens' 23–20 loss to the New England Patriots in the AFC Championship.

=== 2012 ===
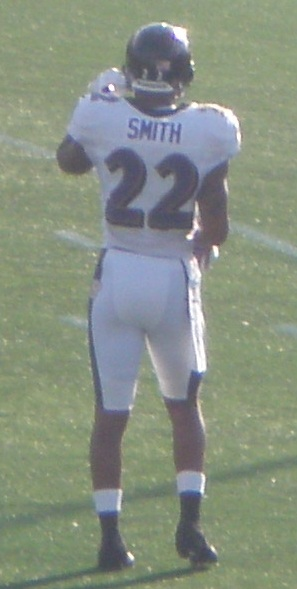
Smith in 2012

Smith entered training camp under new defensive coordinator Dean Pees, and competed against Cary Williams for the job as the starting cornerback. Smith was again named the third cornerback on the Ravens' depth chart to start the 2012 regular season, behind Lardarius Webb and Williams.

In Week 6, Smith recorded a season-high seven solo tackles and broke up one pass during a 31–29 victory over the Dallas Cowboys. The following week, he earned his first start of the season in place of Lardarius Webb, who was placed on injured reserve after tearing his ACL. Smith went on to make four solo tackles and deflected a pass as the Ravens' were routed 43–13 by the Houston Texans. On November 15, 2012, it was reported Smith had undergone sports hernia surgery and missed the next five games (Weeks 10-14) while recovering. Smith finished the 2012 regular season with 34 combined tackles (30 solo) and three pass break ups in 11 games and two starts.

The Baltimore Ravens finished first in their division with a 10-6 record and went on to defeat the Indianapolis Colts, Denver Broncos, and New England Patriots in the playoffs. On February 3, 2013, Smith recorded a solo tackle and two pass deflections during the Baltimore Ravens' 34–31 victory over the San Francisco 49ers in Super Bowl XLVII. Smith showed huge improvement by being one of the key standout performers during that postseason. He made a huge individual effort on the final goal line stand of Super Bowl XLVII, as he was targeted on consecutive plays by Colin Kaepernick during the 49ers' final offensive drive of the game. While covering Michael Crabtree, he prevented the San Francisco 49ers from scoring on fourth down in the final minutes.

=== 2013 ===
In the Baltimore Ravens' season-opener at the Denver Broncos and recorded six solo tackles, a pass break up, and forced a fumble during their 49–27 loss. Smith recorded his first interception of the season in Week 6 against Green Bay Packers quarterback Aaron Rodgers when he picked him off in the end zone. In Week 15, Smith collected a season-high seven combined tackles as the Ravens' won at the Detroit Lions 18-16. He did an excellent job defending the league’s best receiver, Calvin Johnson, during that game. In a season-ending loss in week 17 versus the Cincinnati Bengals, he recorded his second interception of the year when he picked off an Andy Dalton pass in the end zone. He finished the 2013 season with a career-high 58 combined tackles (49 solo), a career-high 15 pass deflections, two interceptions, and a forced fumble in 16 games and 16 starts. Smith had a strong season and got viewed as one of the league’s ascending young cornerbacks.

=== 2014 ===
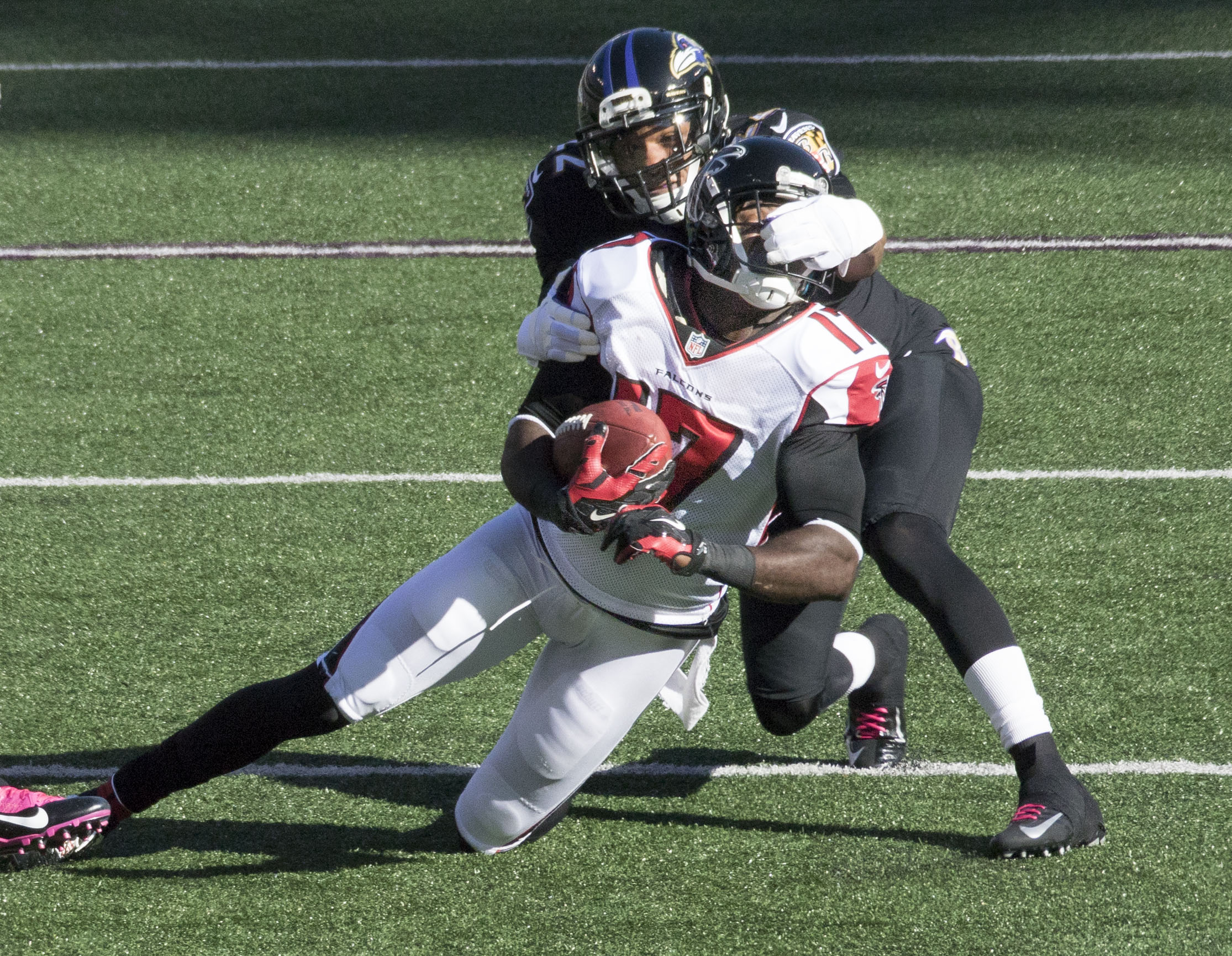
Smith facemasking Devin Hester in 2014

On April 17, 2014, the Ravens exercised the fifth-year, $6.89 million option on Smith's rookie contract. He entered training camp slated as the starting cornerback after Corey Graham departed for the Buffalo Bills in free agency. Head coach John Harbaugh named Smith the starting cornerback, opposite Lardarius Webb, entering the regular season.

In Week 3, Smith recorded a season-high six solo tackles in the Ravens' 23–21 victory at the Cleveland Browns. On October 12, 2014, he collected five solo tackles, a pass breakup, and made his first and only interception of the season as the Ravens' routed the Tampa Bay Buccaneers 48–17. On October 26, 2014, Smith injured his left foot on the opening series of a 24–27 loss at the Cincinnati Bengals. He attempted to limp off the field, but was eventually carted off by trainers and had it examined. On November 6, 2014, the Baltimore Ravens announced that they would be placing Smith on injured reserve for the rest of the season after it was discovered that his foot injury would require surgery. Prior to his injury, Smith was having his best season yet and one of the best seasons of any cornerback across the league. He allowed only 20 receptions for 163 receiving yards and no touchdowns and a quarterback rating of 51.5. He finished the 2014 season with 28 combined tackles (22 solo), six pass deflections, and an interception in eight games and eight starts.

=== 2015 ===
On April 21, 2015, the Baltimore Ravens signed Smith to a four-year, $41.1 million contract extension that includes $21 million guaranteed and a signing bonus of $13 million.

Webb and Smith remained the starting cornerbacks to begin 2015 with Kyle Arrington and Asa Jackson as their backups to start the season. He started the Baltimore Ravens' season-opener at the Denver Broncos and recorded eight solo tackles, a pass break up, and returned a Peyton Manning interception for a 24-yard touchdown in the Ravens' 13–19 loss. It marked his first career touchdown. The next week, he made five solo tackles, broke up a pass, and made his first career sack on Oakland Raiders' quarterback Derek Carr in the Ravens' 33–37 loss. Smith also gave up his first touchdown in two years when Raiders rookie wide receiver Amari Cooper beat him for a 68-yard touchdown pass on the game’s opening drive. The next week, Smith had possibly the worst game of his career as he was constantly beaten in coverage by wide receiver A. J. Green in a 24-28 loss to the Cincinnati Bengals. Bengals 28-24 Ravens (Sep 27, 2015) Final Score On October 11, 2015, Smith collected a season-high nine combined tackles in a 30-33 loss to the Cleveland Browns. For much of the season, Smith struggled to regain the level of play he had prior to the injury he suffered the previous season. He seemed to get healthier as 2015 went on, however, and started playing better over the second half of the year. He finished the 2015 season with 54 combined tackles (48 solo), ten pass deflections, a career-high three interceptions, a sack, and a touchdown in 16 games and 16 starts.

=== 2016 ===
Smith missed two games (Weeks 11-12) due to a lingering back injury. On December 4, 2016, he recorded a season-high six combined tackles and deflected a pass during a 38–6 victory against the Miami Dolphins. On December 30, 2016, Smith was placed on injured reserve after suffering a high ankle sprain in a Week 14 loss against the New England Patriots. He finished the 2016 season with a total of 32 combined tackles (29 solo) and four pass deflections in 11 games and 11 starts. Pro Football Focus ranked Smith 48th in overall grades among cornerbacks in 2016.

=== 2017 ===
Smith entered the 2017 season as the starting cornerback with newly acquired free agent Brandon Carr.

He started the Baltimore Ravens' season-opener against the Cincinnati Bengals and recorded three solo tackles, a pass deflection, and made an interception off of quarterback Andy Dalton in the fourth quarter. The interception was the fourth on the day for the Ravens' defense in their 20–0 victory. In Week 5, teammate Patrick Onwuasor forced a fumble and it was recovered by Smith and returned 47-yards for his second career touchdown during a 30–17 victory against the Oakland Raiders. On October 26, 2017, Smith collected a season-high four solo tackles, broke up three passes, and returned an interception for a 50-yard touchdown as the Ravens' routed the Miami Dolphins 40–0. On December 3, 2017, Smith recorded three solo tackles during a 44-20 victory against the Detroit Lions before being carted off the field with an Achilles injury. The following day, it was discovered Smith had torn his Achilles tendon and would miss the remainder of season. Smith claimed that the injury bothered him since October 1, but decided to play through it. On December 4, 2017, it was reported that Smith violated the NFL's performance enhancing substances policy and would serve a four game suspension. He would be able to serve his suspension while on injured reserve. He was placed on injured reserve on December 5, 2017. Smith finished the season with 28 combined tackles (26 solo), nine pass deflections, three interceptions, and a touchdown in 12 games and 12 starts. He received an overall grade of 86.2 from Pro Football Focus and ranked 15th in overall grades among cornerbacks in 2017.

=== 2018 ===
Smith was suspended the first four games of the 2018 season for violating the NFL's Personal Conduct Policy. He played in 12 games with 10 starts, recording 45 combined tackles, nine pass deflections, and two interceptions.

=== 2019 ===
Injuries, the emergence of fellow corner Marlon Humphrey, and the acquisition of Marcus Peters limited the play of Smith throughout the 2019 season. He did record an interception which he returned for 7 yards in the closing moments of the Ravens' Week 12 45–6 blowout win over the Los Angeles Rams. Overall, Smith played nine games with five starts recording 30 tackles, an interception, and six pass breakups.

=== 2020 ===
After testing the free agent market, Smith re-signed with the Ravens on a one-year, $6 million contract on March 24, 2020. In Week 6 against the Philadelphia Eagles, he had a tackle, a fumble recovery and a pass breakup. However, he would also be plagued by injuries throughout the season again. He signed a one-year, $5 million contract extension through the 2021 season on January 1, 2021.

=== 2021 ===
Smith saw mostly on and off play during what would be an injury-plagued season for the Ravens that saw 19 players go on IR. He started and played every snap in the final two games of the year due to Ravens suffering numerous injuries in their secondary, including the loss of Marcus Peters and Marlon Humphrey. He finished the season with 18 tackles and three pass breakups.

=== Retirement ===
On October 3, 2022, Smith formally retired as a member of the Ravens.

== NFL career statistics ==
Legend
	Won the Super Bowl
**Bold**	Career high

=== Regular season ===
Year	Team	Games		Tackles				Interceptions					Fumbles			
Year	Team	GP	GS	Cmb	Solo	Ast	Sck	PD	Int	Yds	Avg	TD	FF	FR	Yds	TD
2011	BAL	12	3	20	20	0	0.0	8	2	48	24.0	0	0	0	0	0
2012	BAL	11	2	34	30	4	0.0	3	0	0	0.0	0	0	0	0	0
2013	BAL	**16**	**16**	**58**	**49**	9	0.0	**15**	2	0	0.0	0	**3**	0	0	0
2014	BAL	8	8	28	22	6	0.0	6	1	31	**31.0**	0	0	0	0	0
2015	BAL	**16**	**16**	54	48	6	**1.0**	10	**3**	24	8.0	**1**	0	0	0	0
2016	BAL	11	11	32	29	3	0.0	4	0	0	0.0	0	0	0	0	0
2017	BAL	12	12	28	26	2	0.0	9	**3**	**58**	19.3	**1**	0	**1**	**47**	**1**
2018	BAL	12	10	45	34	**11**	0.0	9	2	4	2.0	0	0	0	0	0
2019	BAL	9	5	30	28	2	**1.0**	6	1	7	7.0	0	0	0	0	0
2020	BAL	11	5	27	23	4	**1.0**	1	0	0	0.0	0	0	**1**	4	0
2021	BAL	10	2	18	15	3	0.0	3	0	0	0.0	0	0	0	0	0
PFR		128	90	374	324	50	3.0	74	14	172	12.3	2	3	2	51	1

=== Playoffs ===
Year	Team	Games		Tackles				Interceptions					Fumbles			
Year	Team	GP	GS	Cmb	Solo	Ast	Sck	PD	Int	Yds	Avg	TD	FF	FR	Yds	TD
2011	BAL	2	**1**	3	1	**2**	0.0	**1**	**1**	**39**	**39.0**	0	0	**1**	**4**	0
2012	BAL	**4**	0	4	4	0	0.0	2	0	0	0.0	0	0	0	0	0
2014	BAL	0	0	Did not play due to injury												
2018	BAL	1	**1**	**7**	**7**	0	0.0	1	0	0	0.0	0	0	0	0	0
2019	BAL	1	0	0	0	0	0.0	1	0	0	0.0	0	0	0	0	0
2020	BAL	2	**1**	5	3	**2**	0.0	0	0	0	0.0	0	0	0	0	0
PFR		10	3	19	15	4	0.0	5	1	39	39.0	0	0	1	4	0

== Personal life ==
On July 13, 2014, Smith was arrested and charged with misdemeanor disorderly conduct after an alleged incident at a suburban Baltimore bar. Smith was the fifth Baltimore Raven arrested in the 2014 NFL offseason.

Smith is a cousin of Nat Berhe who played safety in the NFL.
