= Nat Berhe =

American football player (born 1991)

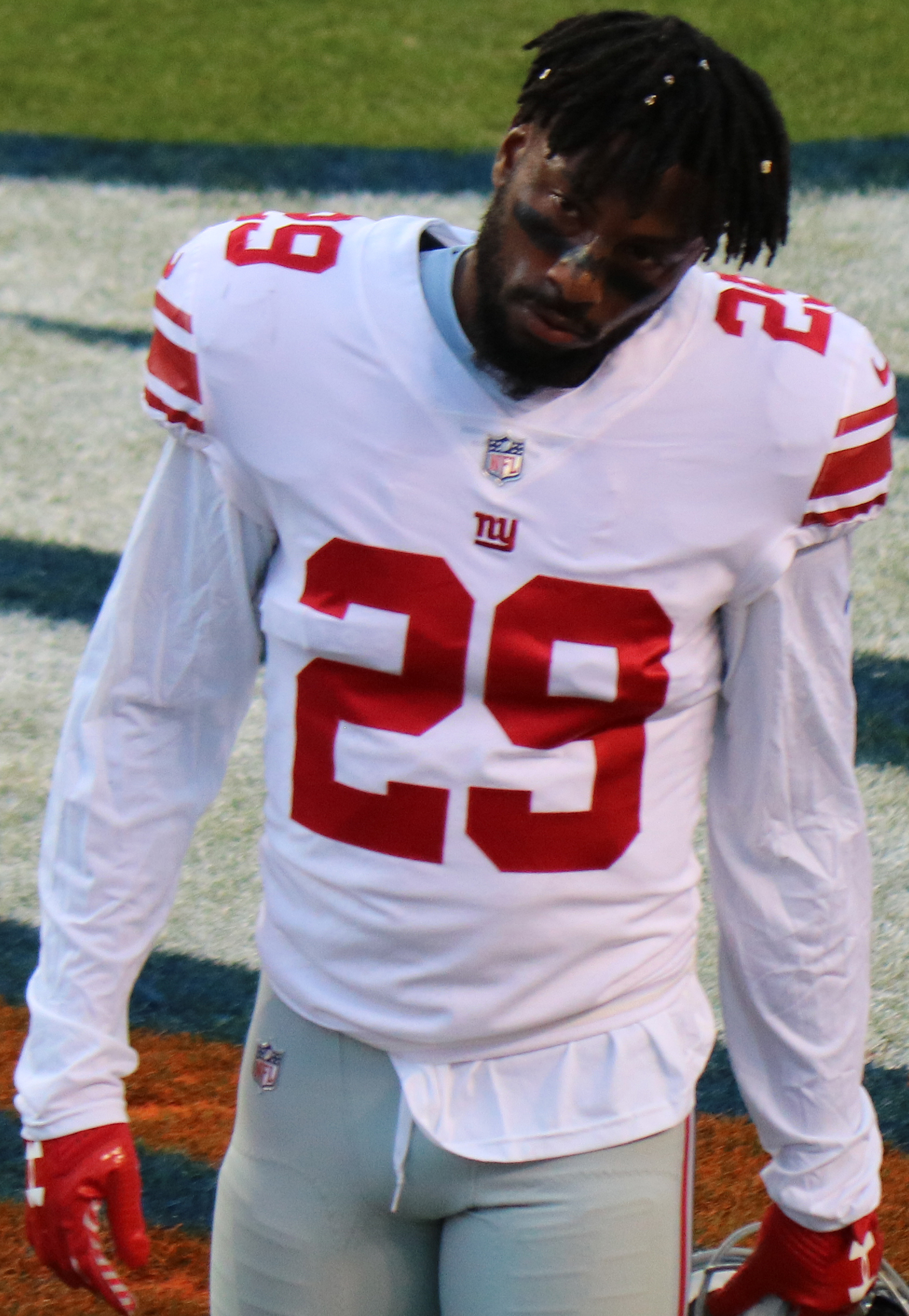
- Berhe with the New York Giants in 2017

No. 29, 31, 34
- Position: Safety

Personal information
- Born: July 6, 1991 (age 35); Fontana, California, U.S.
- Listed height: 5 ft 11 in (1.80 m)
- Listed weight: 195 lb (88 kg)

Career information
- High school: Colton (Colton, California)
- College: San Diego State
- NFL draft: 2014: 5th round, 152nd overall pick

Career history
- New York Giants (2014–2017); Pittsburgh Steelers (2018)

Awards and highlights
- First-team All-Mountain West (2013); Second-team All-Mountain West (2012)

Career NFL statistics
- Total tackles: 51
- Sacks: 1.0
- Forced fumbles: 1
- Fumble recoveries: 1
- Stats at Pro Football Reference

Natnael Sabhato Berhe (born July 6, 1991) is an American former professional football player who was a safety in the National Football League (NFL). He was selected by the New York Giants in the fifth round of the 2014 NFL draft. He played college football for the San Diego State Aztecs.

== Early life ==
Berhe was born in Fontana, California, and attended Colton High School. His mother, Judy, is African American; his father, Berhe Asfaha, emigrated from the Eritrea in 1970. During his youth, his family owned a gas station. His cousin Isaac Amanios, also an immigrant from Eritrea, was killed in the 2015 San Bernardino shooting.

Berhe played two years of varsity football as a defensive back and running back and also lettered twice in track and field. He was also a member of the honor society. During his senior year, he was named a team captain for the Colton Yellow Jackets. Additionally that year he had 47 tackles, one interception, and 32 rushes for 182 yards. His best game of the year came against Cajon High, where he recorded 11 tackles (four assisted). His efforts in his senior year earned him a spot on the All-California Interscholastic Federation (CIF) defensive team.

== College career ==
=== Recruiting ===
Berhe was ranked as the 47th best safety in the state of California, and the 83rd best player overall in the state by Rivals.com. He measured in at five-foot-eleven inches, weighed 160 pounds, and had a 2.9 grade point average. He was highly recruited coming out of high school, receiving interest in several schools and scholarship offers from San Diego State, The University of Minnesota, The University of New Mexico, and UTEP.

=== San Diego State University ===
Berhe ultimately signed his letter of intent and joined the San Diego State Aztecs football program; he received a redshirt designation his freshman year in 2009. In 2010, Berhe played in 12 of 13 games and received his first action on the college gridiron by playing on defense and special teams vs Nicholls State, recording one tackle. Later that year against the New Mexico State Aggies, he had seven tackles (1 for a loss), and a fumble recovery on special teams that set up a touchdown for the Aztecs. Berhe recorded the first interception of his college career against Utah State, and returned it 10 yards down the field. He made his first start against then 23rd-ranked Air Force and helped the Aztecs pull out an upset victory. He missed the game against Wyoming due to a concussion.

In his redshirt sophomore year in 2011, Berhe started all 13 games. During a game against Michigan, he recorded his second career interception in the third quarter and finished the game with six tackles. He had his most tackles in a game against Wyoming with eight. Later in the year, in a game against Colorado State, Berhe had the first forced-fumble of his career and an interception. His performance earned him MW co-defensive Player of the Week honors. In the Louisiana-Lafayette loss in the New Orleans Bowl, he had a team- and career-high 10 tackles. His performance on the year earned him honorable mention on the all-Midwestern conference team.

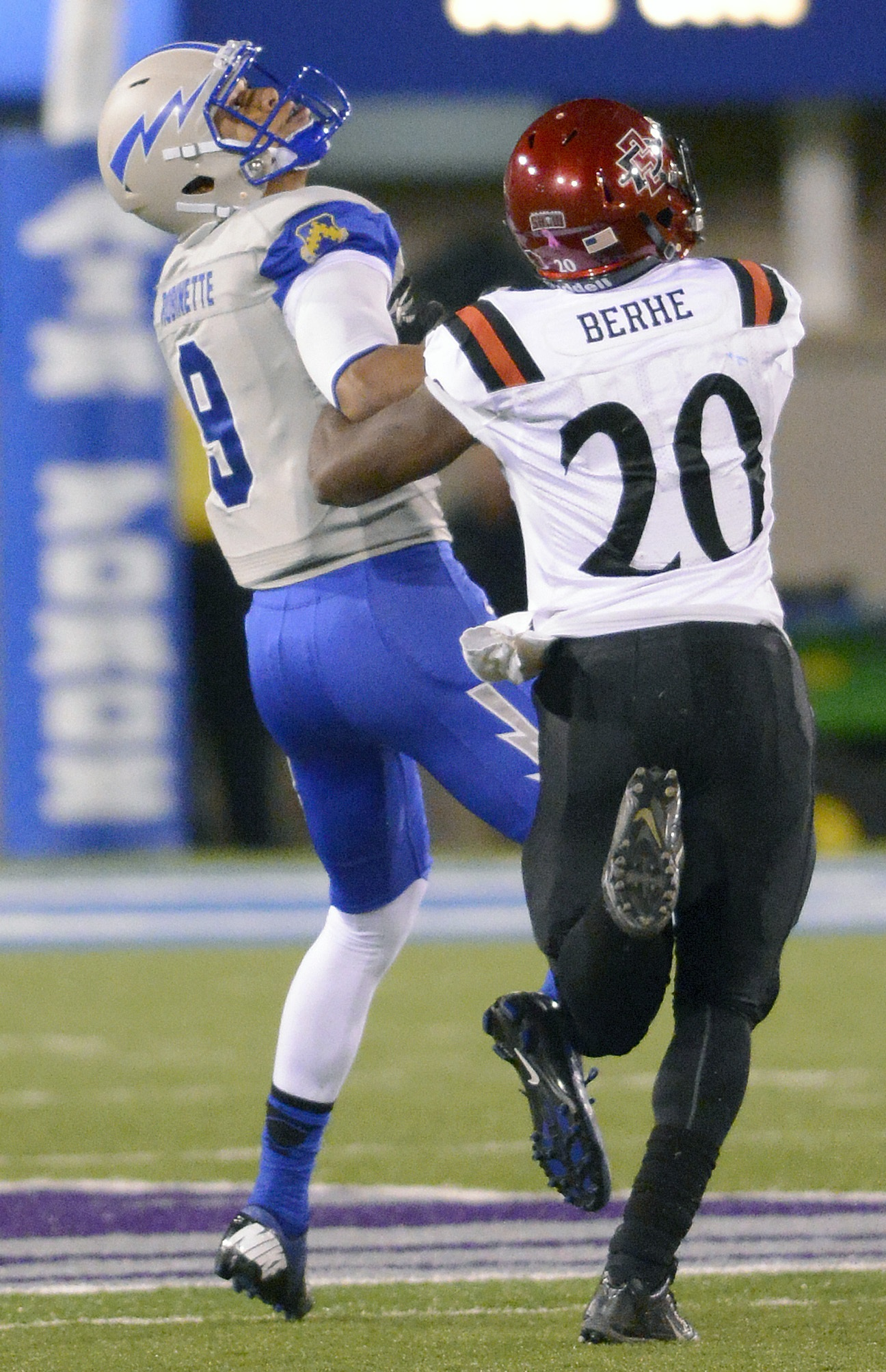
Berhe (right) with San Diego State in 2013

In what would be his final year for the Aztecs, Berhe was named team captain. He had seven tackles (1 for a loss) and a fumble recovery against Northern Illinois, and had another fumble recovery against Oregon State. When the Aztecs went against Air Force, he had 14 tackles (7 solo), the most by any player on the team since his game against Wyoming. He got his first career sack against New Mexico. Later in the year, in a game against San Jose State, he returned a blocked kick 56 yards in the fourth quarter. He finished the year with a career-high 99 tackles, 60 of which were solo. and also tied for the top spot on the team with two fumble recoveries. At the end of the year, he was chosen as a 1st-team All-Mountain West honoree as voted on by the league coaches and media.

Berhe finished his college career by playing in 51 games with 41 starts, 299 tackles (197 solo), one sack, 12 tackles for losses, a force fumble, 4 recoveries, 5 interceptions, and 20 defended passes.

== Professional career ==
=== Pre-draft ===
Berhe was projected to be drafted in the fourth or fifth round of the draft. Nolan Nawocki of NFL.com said that he was an "instinctive defender" who reacted quickly with great pursuit. He also complimented Berhe on playing fast and having great body control, and on being an "aggressive tackler" with a great passion for the game, as well as a "very likable personality". Nawocki was less fond of Berhe's size, considering it more appropriate for a cornerback than a safety, stating that he could stand to bulk up physically. He also said that Berhe "[p]lays a bit out of control and will miss some tackles in the open field", and that he also lacks special-teams experience.

Dane Brugler of CBS Sports also complimented Berhe's speed, adding that he has great vision and "active hands to initiate contact and fight through blocks", with a "football character and competitive drive desired by NFL teams". He agreed that Berhe didn't have ideal size, and that his speed wasn't impressive. He also believed that Berhe would be "out-muscled at times" by larger wide receivers, and "will get flagged for downfield contact and needs to improve his discipline".

Pre-draft measurables
Height	Weight	Arm length	Hand span	40-yard dash	10-yard split	20-yard split	20-yard shuttle	Three-cone drill	Vertical jump	Broad jump	Bench press
5 ft 10 1/2 in (1.79 m)	193 lb (88 kg)	30 5/8 in (0.78 m)	8 1/2 in (0.22 m)	4.5 s	1.63 s	2.74 s	4.22 s	7.08 s	35 1/2 in (0.90 m)	9 ft 9 in (2.97 m)	15 reps
All values from NFL Combine

=== New York Giants ===
The New York Giants selected Berhe in the fifth round with the 152nd overall pick, making him the first Eritrean-American player to be drafted into the NFL.

After Berhe's first preseason game versus the Buffalo Bills, in which he recorded three tackles and a forced fumble, Giants safeties coach David Merritt gave Berhe the nickname "The Missile". Berhe stated that he had been learning from the veterans on the roster, mainly Quintin Demps, and stated that Antrel Rolle was the leader of the Giants defense.

On September 5, 2015, Berhe's 2015 season came to an end when he was officially placed on injured reserve by the Giants. He had missed most of training camp due to a calf injury that required surgery to remove a blood clot.

=== Pittsburgh Steelers ===
On April 4, 2018, Berhe signed with the Pittsburgh Steelers.

== Personal life ==
He is the first player with Eritrean descent (through his father) drafted into the NFL, and is also the cousin of former Baltimore Ravens cornerback Jimmy Smith.
