= Shareece Wright =

American football player (born 1987)

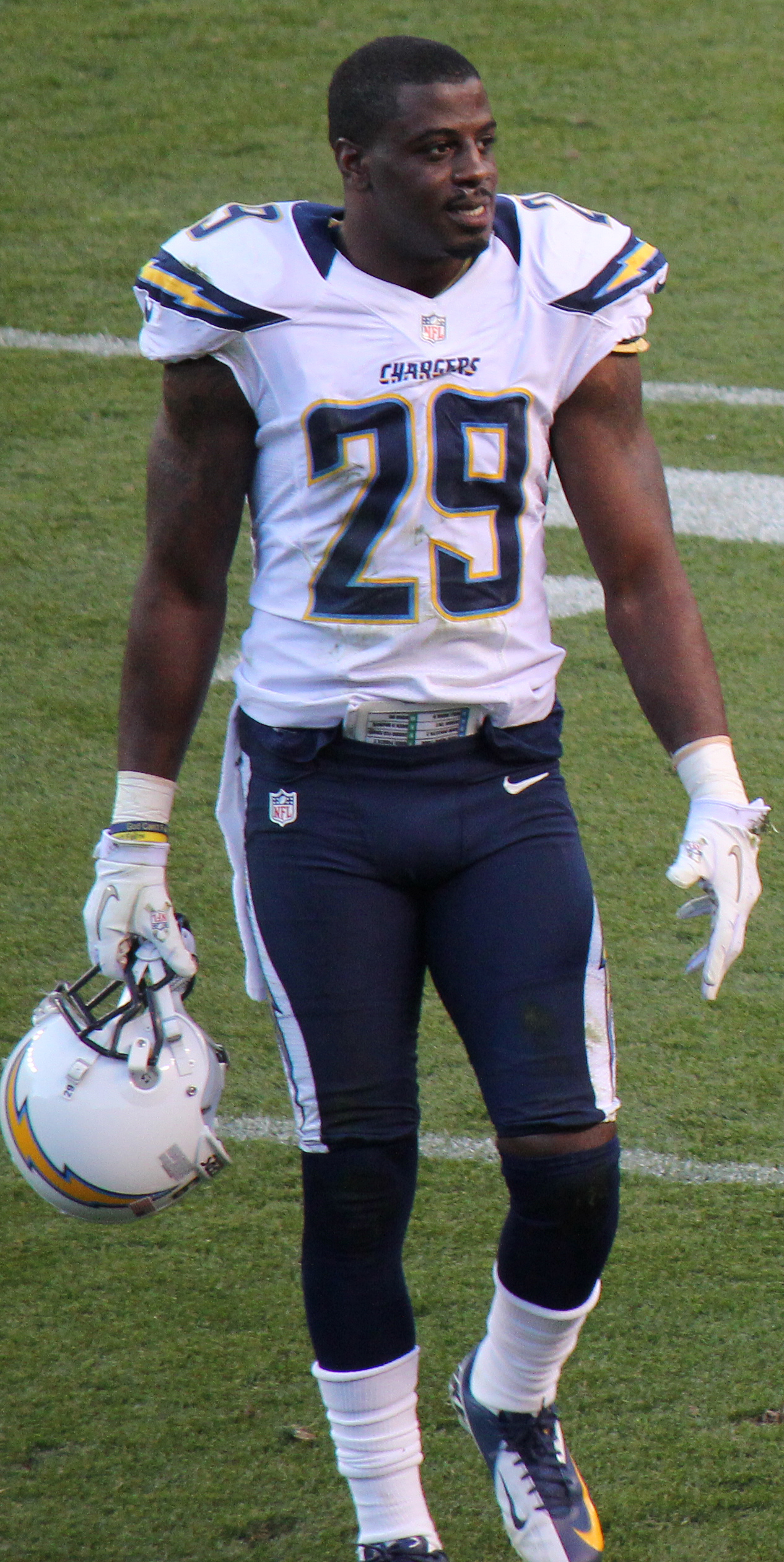
- Wright with the San Diego Chargers in 2012

No. 29, 35, 24, 20, 43
- Position: Cornerback

Personal information
- Born: April 8, 1987 (age 39); Colton, California, U.S.
- Listed height: 5 ft 11 in (1.80 m)
- Listed weight: 184 lb (83 kg)

Career information
- High school: Colton
- College: USC
- NFL draft: 2011: 3rd round, 89th overall pick

Career history
- San Diego Chargers (2011–2014); San Francisco 49ers (2015); Baltimore Ravens (2015–2016); Buffalo Bills (2017); Oakland Raiders (2018)*; Houston Texans (2018)
- * Offseason or practice squad member only

Career NFL statistics
- Total tackles: 305
- Forced fumbles: 2
- Fumble recoveries: 3
- Pass deflections: 41
- Interceptions: 2
- Stats at Pro Football Reference

Shareece Lyndon Wright (born April 8, 1987) is an American former professional football player who was a cornerback in the National Football League (NFL). He played college football for the USC Trojans, and was selected by the San Diego Chargers in the third round of the 2011 NFL draft. He was also a member of the San Francisco 49ers, Baltimore Ravens, Buffalo Bills, Oakland Raiders, and Houston Texans.

== Early life ==
Wright played football at Colton High School in Colton, California, where he was a star player. He had 68 tackles and 2 sacks in 2005, plus ran for 1,094 yards on 78 carries (14.1 avg.) with 16 TDs and caught 13 passes for 336 yards (25.8 avg.) with 4 TDs despite missing the first 2 games with a broken left hand. He also ran track at Colton, where he posted a best of 10.9 seconds in the 100-meter dash.

== College career ==
Wright was a backup cornerback and key special teams player as a freshman in 2006, his first year at the University of Southern California. Overall in 2006 while appearing in all 13 games, he had 15 tackles and 2 fumble recoveries (versus Arizona State and Stanford).

Wright was used often as USC's nickel back and also played on special teams as a sophomore in 2007. Overall in 2007 while appearing in 11 games (all but Stanford and Arizona), he had 29 tackles, including 3.5 for losses of 26 yards (with an 8-yard sack), plus 4 deflections.

Wright started USC's first 2 games (Virginia and Ohio State) of his 2008 junior season at cornerback and was productive, but then suffered a hairline fracture in his neck in practice prior to the Oregon State game and was sidelined the rest of the season.

Wright was set to start at cornerback as a junior in 2009, but was ruled academically ineligible in 2009 fall camp and had to sit out the regular season. He regained his eligibility for the bowl game against Boston College and started that contest, getting 2 tackles and an interception (which set up a USC touchdown). He was limited in 2009 spring practice while recuperating from a neck injury.

The 2010 season was the only one in which he was a full-time member of the Trojans' secondary, as he started all games he played in and was voted a team captain.

== Professional career ==
Pre-draft measurables
Height	Weight	Arm length	Hand span	Wingspan	40-yard dash	10-yard split	20-yard split	20-yard shuttle	Three-cone drill	Vertical jump	Broad jump	Bench press
5 ft 10 7/8 in (1.80 m)	185 lb (84 kg)	32 1/4 in (0.82 m)	9 1/2 in (0.24 m)	6 ft 2 1/4 in (1.89 m)	4.56 s	1.63 s	2.68 s	4.28 s	7.09 s	35.5 in (0.90 m)	10 ft 0 in (3.05 m)	16 reps
All values from NFL Combine/Pro Day

=== San Diego Chargers ===
==== 2012 season ====
Wright had appeared on track for a big year in 2012 after appearing in just seven games as a rookie. He was coming off a solid preseason, one that included a performance against Dallas in which he had a 73-yard interception return, a sack and forced fumble, and two passes defensed. But on the first play of the Chargers’ 2012 opener at Oakland, Wright hurt his foot while making a special teams tackle inside the 20 and it sent him to the sidelines for the rest of the night and for the next six games. Once healed, Wright played in each of the Chargers’ last nine games, and he finished the year with 14 tackles on defense and seven on special teams.

==== 2013 season ====
Wright was named starter opposite of newly acquired Derek Cox. Wright got off to a slow start, giving up 193 receiving yards to DeSean Jackson in week 2 win against the Philadelphia Eagles. Wright improved during San Diego's run toward the playoffs. In Week 14, Wright picked off New York Giants quarterback Eli Manning, returning it 41 yards for his first career interception. Wright played well against Peyton Manning and Denver's high powered offense, holding star receiver Demaryius Thomas to 4 receptions for 45 yards in a winning effort. Wright finished the regular season starting 13 games, collecting 56 tackles, 54 solo, 1 interception, and 9 passes defended. In the Wild Card round, Wright picked off Cincinnati Bengals quarterback Andy Dalton, returning it 30 yards, which set up a Nick Novak field goal. The game ended in San Diego winning 27-10.

==== 2014 season ====
Wright headed into 2014 with more experience as a starter and would wound up playing 14 games, recording 60 total tackles (54 solo), and 10 passes defended.

=== San Francisco 49ers ===
==== 2015 season ====
On March 14, 2015, Wright signed a one-year contract with the San Francisco 49ers. After being inactive for the first three games of the 2015 season, it announced that he was seeking a trade or his release from the 49ers. The 49ers granted his request by releasing him on October 10.

=== Baltimore Ravens ===
==== 2015 season ====
Just a couple of days after Wright's release from the 49ers on October 13, 2015, the Ravens signed Wright after Will Davis suffered a season-ending ACL tear.

==== 2016 season ====
On March 7, 2016, the Baltimore Ravens signed Wright to a three-year contract extension. On March 7, 2017, Wright was released by the Ravens.

=== Buffalo Bills ===
On May 1, 2017, Wright signed a one-year contract with the Buffalo Bills. He played in 12 games with five starts, recording 44 tackles with five passes defensed and one interception.

=== Oakland Raiders ===
On March 19, 2018, Wright signed a one-year contract with the Oakland Raiders. He was released on September 1, 2018.

=== Houston Texans ===
On September 11, 2018, Wright signed with the Houston Texans. He played in 12 games with five starts, recording 32 combined tackles and five passes defensed.

== NFL career statistics ==
Legend
**Bold**	Career high

=== Regular season ===
Year	Team	Games		Tackles					Interceptions					Fumbles			
Year	Team	GP	GS	Cmb	Solo	Ast	Sck	TFL	Int	Yds	TD	Lng	PD	FF	FR	Yds	TD
2011	SDG	7	0	4	4	0	0.0	0	0	0	0	0	0	0	0	0	0
2012	SDG	10	0	17	17	0	0.0	1	0	0	0	0	2	**1**	0	0	0
2013	SDG	13	13	56	**54**	2	0.0	1	**1**	41	0	41	**9**	0	0	0	0
2014	SDG	**14**	**14**	**60**	**54**	6	0.0	2	0	0	0	0	**9**	0	0	0	0
2015	BAL	11	7	40	34	6	0.0	1	0	0	0	0	5	0	0	0	0
2016	BAL	12	9	52	44	**8**	0.0	**4**	0	0	0	0	6	0	1	0	0
2017	BUF	12	5	44	37	7	0.0	1	**1**	**54**	0	**54**	5	**1**	**2**	0	0
2018	HOU	12	5	32	25	7	0.0	3	0	0	0	0	5	0	0	0	0
Career		91	53	305	269	36	0.0	13	2	95	0	54	41	2	3	0	0

=== Playoffs ===
Year	Team	Games		Tackles					Interceptions					Fumbles			
Year	Team	GP	GS	Cmb	Solo	Ast	Sck	TFL	Int	Yds	TD	Lng	PD	FF	FR	Yds	TD
2013	SDG	**2**	**2**	**9**	**7**	**2**	0.0	0	**1**	**30**	0	**30**	**4**	0	0	0	0
2018	HOU	1	0	0	0	0	0.0	0	0	0	0	0	1	0	0	0	0
Career		3	2	9	7	2	0.0	0	1	30	0	30	5	0	0	0	0

== Personal life ==
A native of Colton, California, east of Los Angeles, the Chargers were Wright’s hometown team and they were the team he was hopeful would draft him. He even brought a Chargers hat with him to his 2011 draft party just in case the call came, which it did after Wright’s strong finish to an up-and-down collegiate career at nearby USC.

In February 2024, Wright identified himself publicly as one of 12 former Colton High School football players who sued the Colton Joint Unified School District and former athletic trainer Tiffany Strauss-Gordon for sexual assault. At the time, her father was the football team's head coach. According to Wright, she began grooming him when he was a 15-year-old freshman and she was 21. She allegedly first performed oral sex on him in the summer after his sophomore year. The lawsuit alleges that Strauss-Gordon performed oral sex on him at least 20 times when he was a junior and that they had vaginal intercourse at least 15 times.

Wright works closely with the Junior Diabetes Foundation. The daughter of his former football coach from Colton High School has the disease and it inspired Wright to help. In September 2011, he was invited to throw out the first pitch at a San Diego Padres game as an introduction to his partnership with the foundation.
