= Tyler Ervin =

American football player (born 1993)

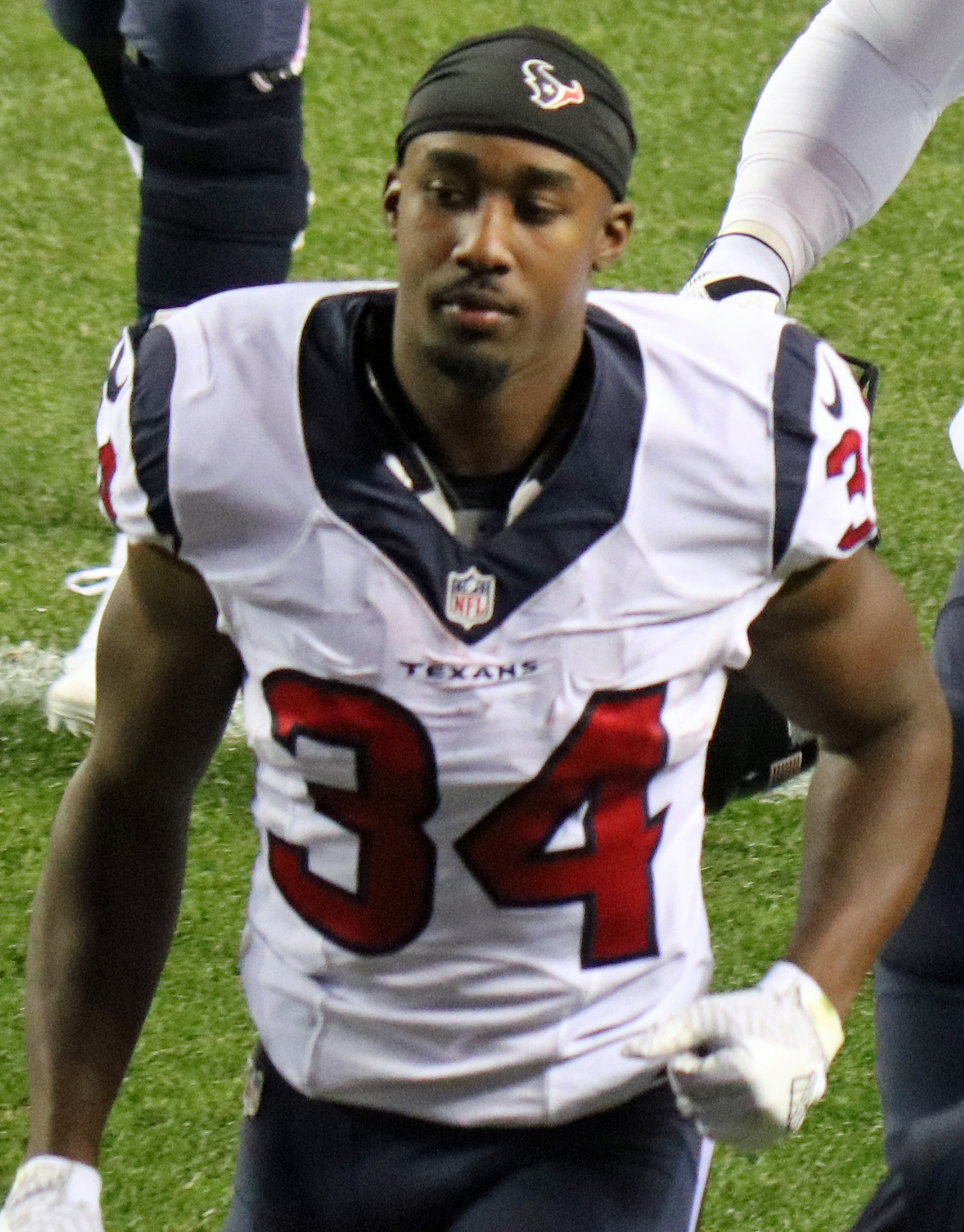
- Ervin with the Houston Texans in 2016

No. 34, 21, 24, 32
- Positions: Running back, return specialist

Personal information
- Born: October 7, 1993 (age 33); San Bernardino, California, U.S.
- Listed height: 5 ft 10 in (1.78 m)
- Listed weight: 192 lb (87 kg)

Career information
- High school: Colton (Colton, California)
- College: San Jose State
- NFL draft: 2016: 4th round, 119th overall pick

Career history
- Houston Texans (2016–2018); Baltimore Ravens (2018–2019)*; Jacksonville Jaguars (2019); Green Bay Packers (2019–2020)
- * Offseason or practice squad member only

Awards and highlights
- Second-team All-American (2015); First-team All-Mountain West (2015)

Career NFL statistics
- Rushing yards: 92
- Rushing average: 4.8
- Receptions: 27
- Receiving yards: 186
- Return yards: 1,703
- Stats at Pro Football Reference

Tyler Anthony Ervin (born October 7, 1993) is an American former professional football player who was a running back and return specialist in the National Football League (NFL). He played college football for the San Jose State Spartans.

== Early life ==
Ervin was born in San Bernardino, California. He attended Colton High School, where he played high school football.

College recruiting
Name	Hometown	School	Height	Weight	40^{‡}	Commit date
Tyler Ervin; RB	Colton, CA	Colton HS	5 ft 10 in (1.78 m)	165 lb (75 kg)	4.48	Jan 16, 2011
Tyler Ervin; RB	Recruit ratings: Rivals: 247Sports: ESPN: (71)					
Overall recruit ranking:
Note: In many cases, Scout, Rivals, 247Sports, On3, and ESPN may conflict in their listings of height and weight.; In these cases, the average was taken. ESPN grades are on a 100-point scale.; Sources: "2011 San Jose St. Football Commitment List". Rivals. Archived from the original on August 6, 2011.; "San José State Spartans 2011 Player Commits". ESPN.; "2011 Team Ranking". Rivals.com.; "San Jose State 2011 Football Commits". 247Sports.

== College career ==
A two-star recruit, Ervin attracted two offers from Idaho and San Jose State. On January 16, 2011, Ervin signed with San José State University.

Ervin began playing for the San Jose State Spartans as a true freshman in 2011 at running back and return specialist. He became the first player to return a kickoff for a touchdown since 2005, when he returned a kickoff 95 yards for a touchdown on November 12 against Utah State. Ervin had 672 return yards and 107 rushing yards.

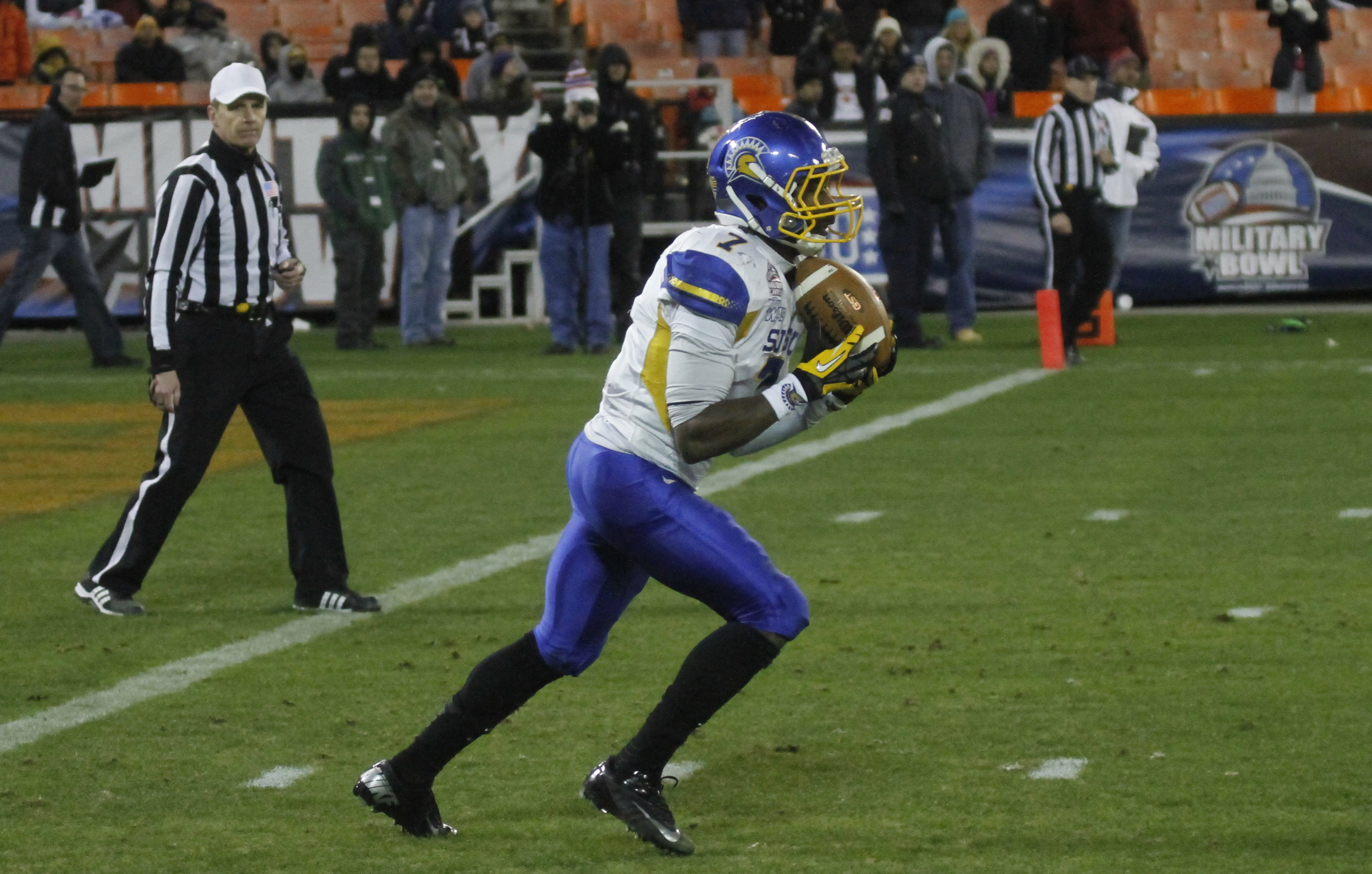
Ervin returns a kickoff during the 2012 Military Bowl.

In the 2012 season, Ervin had 205 rushing and 599 return yards. On September 28, in a 38–34 win over San Diego State, Ervin had a 97-yard kickoff return touchdown. Ervin also caught a 36-yard touchdown reception and returned a kickoff 92 yards for a touchdown on October 20 at UTSA. To cap off an 11–2 season with a year-end #24 ranking in the AP Poll, Ervin had 49 receiving yards and 38 return yards in the Spartans' win over Bowling Green in the 2012 Military Bowl.

Ervin took a medical redshirt year in 2013 after suffering an injury during the season opener against Sacramento State on August 29.

As a redshirt junior in 2014, he had 888 rushing yards, 506 kickoff return yards, and 81 punt return yards. On August 28, Ervin got his first punt return touchdown, a 40-yarder against North Dakota. On September 6, Ervin had a 75-yard touchdown reception against Auburn, tied for the longest passing play against Auburn that year. Ervin also had an 89-yard rushing touchdown in the Spartans' homecoming game win over UNLV on October 4. Sports Illustrated named Ervin to its honorable mention All-America team .

In his redshirt senior season of 2015, Ervin rushed for a single-game school record 300 yards against Fresno State and for 263 yards against New Mexico. In the 2015 Cure Bowl, his final collegiate game, Ervin got his longest career punt return touchdown, for 85 yards in the Spartans' 27–16 win over Georgia State. He finished his senior year with 1,601 rushing yards on 294 carries with 13 touchdowns and 45 receptions for 334 yards with two touchdowns. Along with first-team All-Mountain West Conference, Ervin earned multiple national honors, the Athlon Sports All-American second team and his second straight Sports Illustrated honorable mention All-American title.

== Professional career ==
Pre-draft measurables
Height	Weight	Arm length	Hand span	40-yard dash	10-yard split	20-yard split	Vertical jump	Broad jump	Bench press
5 ft 9 7/8 in (1.77 m)	192 lb (87 kg)	29 3/4 in (0.76 m)	9 1/8 in (0.23 m)	4.41 s	1.56 s	2.59 s	39 in (0.99 m)	10 ft 10 in (3.30 m)	17 reps
Measurables taken at the NFL Combine.

=== Houston Texans ===
Ervin was selected by the Houston Texans in the fourth round (119th overall) of the 2016 NFL draft. On May 5, 2016, Ervin signed a four-year, $2.9 million contract with Houston. Ervin has been compared to established all-purpose players in the NFL like Jamaal Charles and Darren Sproles. He finished his rookie season with three receptions for 18 receiving yards to go along with return duties.

On October 4, 2017, Ervin was placed on injured reserve after suffering a torn patellar tendon in Week 4. He finished the 2017 season with eight receptions for 38 receiving yards to go along with four carries for 12 rushing yards.

On November 7, 2018, Ervin was waived by the Texans.

=== Baltimore Ravens ===
On November 14, 2018, Ervin was signed to the practice squad of the Baltimore Ravens. He signed a reserve/future contract with the Ravens on January 8, 2019. He was waived on August 31, 2019.

=== Jacksonville Jaguars ===
On September 1, 2019, Ervin was claimed off waivers by the Jacksonville Jaguars. He was waived on November 30, 2019.

=== Green Bay Packers ===
On December 2, 2019, Ervin was claimed off waivers by the Green Bay Packers. He was re-signed on March 30, 2020. He was placed on injured reserve on December 9, 2020.

== NFL career statistics ==
=== Regular season ===
Year	Team	Games		Rushing					Receiving					Kick return					Punt return					Fumbles	
Year	Team	GP	GS	Att	Yds	Avg	Lng	TD	Rec	Yds	Avg	Lng	TD	Ret	Yds	Avg	Lng	TD	Ret	Yds	Avg	Lng	TD	Fum	Lost
2016	HOU	12	0	1	3	3.0	3	0	3	18	6.0	9	0	14	263	18.8	33	0	27	261	9.7	9.7	0	3	2
2017	HOU	4	0	4	12	3.0	6	0	8	38	4.8	7	0	5	93	18.6	24	0	8	60	7.5	21	0	0	0
2018	HOU	9	0	0	0	.0	0	0	3	35	11.7	19	0	10	253	25.3	36	0	21	175	8.3	27	0	1	0
2019	JAX	6	0	0	0	.0	0	0	0	0	.0	0	0	5	107	21.4	25	0	5	9	1.8	6	0	1	0
2019	GB	4	0	1	10	10.0	10	0	2	11	5.5	6	0	6	160	26.7	45	0	11	106	9.6	18	0	1	0
2020	GB	8	0	13	67	5.2	21	0	11	84	7.6	24	0	10	196	19.6	34	0	5	20	4.0	11	0	0	0
Career		43	0	19	92	4.8	40	0	11	84	7.6	24	0	50	1,072	21.4	45	0	77	631	8.2	57	0	6	2
Source: NFL.com

=== Postseason ===
Year	Team	Games		Rushing					Receiving					Kick return					Punt return					Fumbles	
Year	Team	GP	GS	Att	Yds	Avg	Lng	TD	Rec	Yds	Avg	Lng	TD	Ret	Yds	Avg	Lng	TD	Ret	Yds	Avg	Lng	TD	Fum	Lost
2016	HOU	2	0	0	0	0.0	0	0	0	0	0.0	0	0	1	14	14.0	14	0	4	23	5.8	16	0	2	0
2019	GB	2	0	0	0	0.0	0	0	0	0	0.0	0	0	3	41	13.7	23	0	1	6	6.0	6	0	0	0
Career		4	0	0	0	0.0	0	0	0	0	0.0	0	0	4	55	13.8	23	0	5	29	5.9	16	0	2	0
Source: pro-football-reference.com
