= Allen Bradford (American football) =

American football player (born 1988)

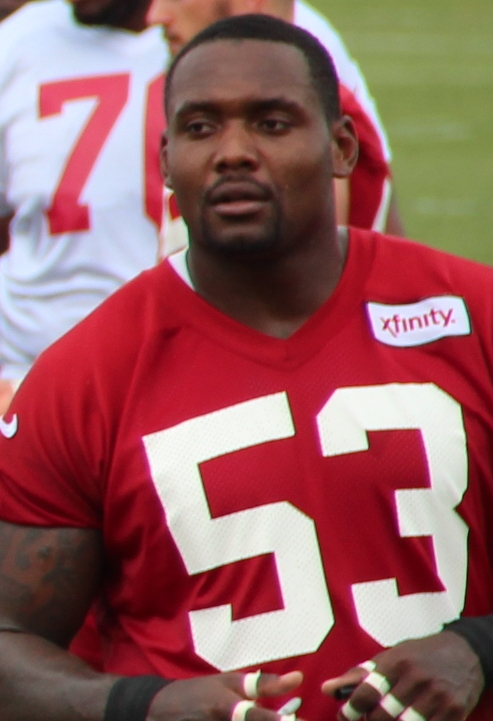
- Bradford with the Atlanta Falcons in 2015

No. 21, 52, 59, 53
- Position: Linebacker

Personal information
- Born: August 31, 1988 (age 38); San Bernardino, California, U.S.
- Listed height: 5 ft 11 in (1.80 m)
- Listed weight: 235 lb (107 kg)

Career information
- High school: Colton (Colton, California)
- College: USC
- NFL draft: 2011: 6th round, 187th overall pick

Career history
- Tampa Bay Buccaneers (2011); Seattle Seahawks (2011–2013); New York Giants (2013); Jacksonville Jaguars (2014)*; Seattle Seahawks (2014)*; Cleveland Browns (2014)*; Seattle Seahawks (2014); Atlanta Falcons (2015)
- * Offseason or practice squad member only

Career NFL statistics
- Total tackles: 11
- Forced fumbles: 1
- Stats at Pro Football Reference

Allen Lord Bradford (born August 31, 1988) is an American former professional football player who was a linebacker in the National Football League (NFL). He was selected by the Tampa Bay Buccaneers in the sixth round of the 2011 NFL draft. He played college football for the USC Trojans. Bradford was also a member of the Seattle Seahawks, New York Giants, Jacksonville Jaguars, Cleveland Browns, and Atlanta Falcons.

== Early life ==
Bradford played running back and linebacker at Colton High School, where he played on the varsity squad for four years. As a senior in 2005, he ran for 1,869 yards on 143 carries with 29 touchdowns, and caught 20 passes for 429 yards with six touchdowns, plus recorded 157 tackles, 12.0 sacks, four forced fumbles and one fumble recovery.

== College career ==
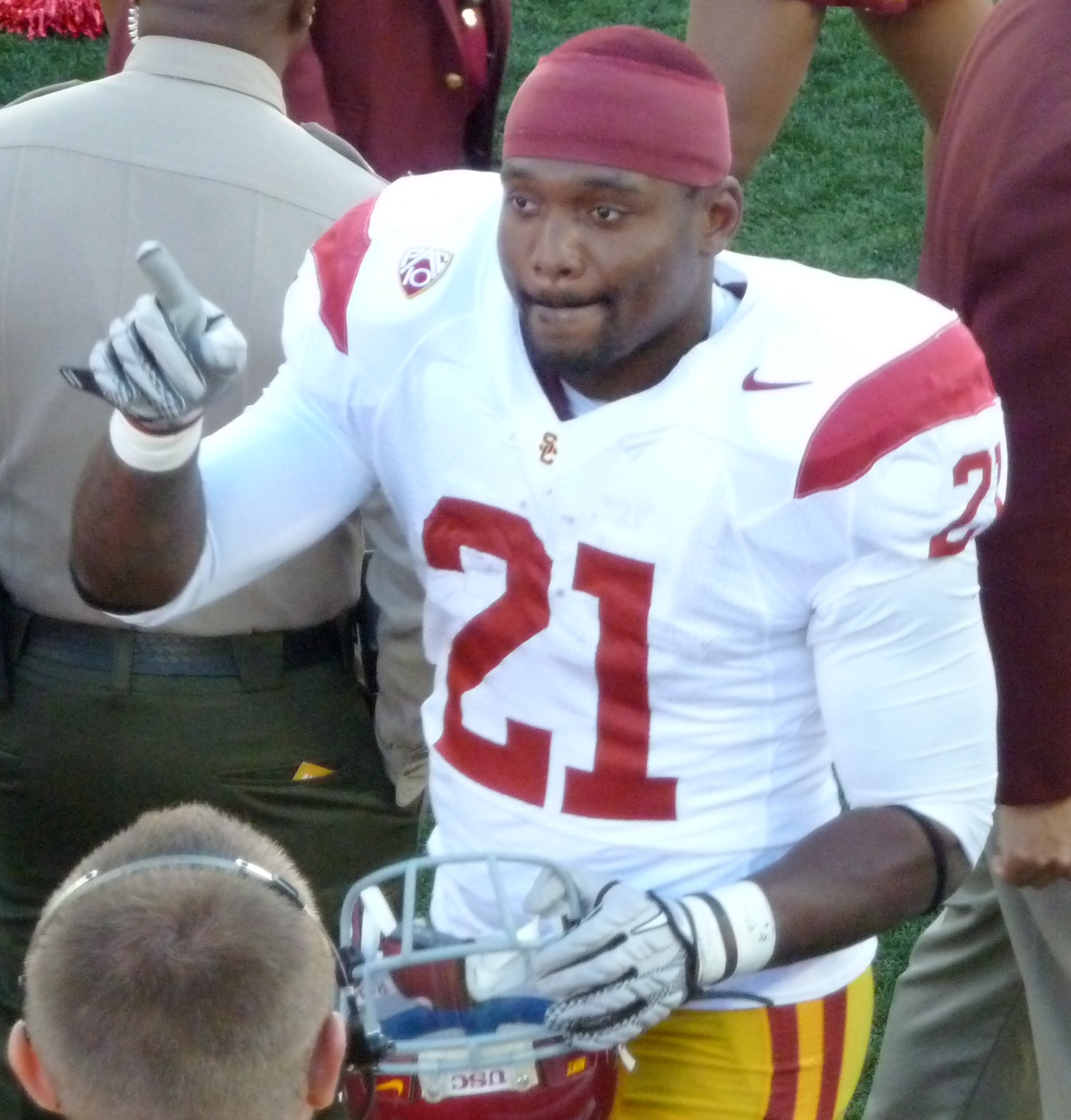
Bradford with USC in 2010

Bradford played for former Seahawks head coach Pete Carroll at USC, where he finished his career with 1,585 yards rushing on 267 carries (5.9 average) and 16 touchdowns in 52 games played. Rushed for 7.2 yards per carry in 2010, good for second in the nation. Was USC’s No. 2 rusher in 2009, earning All-Pac-10 honorable mention. Majored in American studies and ethnicity.

== Professional career ==
Pre-draft measurables
| Height | Weight | Arm length | Hand span | Wingspan | 40-yard dash | 10-yard split | 20-yard shuttle | Three-cone drill | Vertical jump | Broad jump | Bench press |
|---|---|---|---|---|---|---|---|---|---|---|---|
| 5 ft 10 7/8 in (1.80 m) | 242 lb (110 kg) | 32 1/8 in (0.82 m) | 9 3/8 in (0.24 m) | 6 ft 4 1/2 in (1.94 m) | 4.61 s | 1.64 s | 4.39 s | 6.97 s | 29.0 in (0.74 m) | 9 ft 5 in (2.87 m) | 28 reps |
All values from NFL Combine

=== Tampa Bay Buccaneers ===
Bradford was selected by the Tampa Bay Buccaneers in the sixth round, with the 187th overall pick, in the 2011 NFL draft. He was waived on October 13, 2011.

=== Seattle Seahawks (first stint) ===
Bradford was claimed off waivers by the Seattle Seahawks on October 17, 2011.

He was waived two days later, and re-signed to the Seahawks' practice squad on October 21. He was switched to linebacker after re-signing with the Seahawks.

On December 28, 2012, Bradford was signed to the Seahawks 53-man roster. Bradford may be one of the first players in modern NFL history to be drafted as a running back and go on to play linebacker. He rushed for 13 yards on five carries and scored no touchdowns as a running back.

He was released on September 11, 2013, to make space for tight end Kellen Davis.

=== New York Giants ===
Bradford was claimed off waivers by the New York Giants on September 12, 2013. He was released on May 12, 2014.

=== Jacksonville Jaguars ===
Bradford was claimed off waivers by the Jacksonville Jaguars on May 13, 2014. The Jaguars released Bradford on August 24, 2014.

=== Seattle Seahawks (second stint) ===
Bradford was signed to the practice squad of the Seahawks on September 3, 2014, and released on September 9, 2014.

=== Cleveland Browns ===
Bradford signed with the Browns' practice squad on September 16, 2014.

=== Seattle Seahawks (third stint) ===
On November 12, 2014, Bradford was resigned again by the Seahawks. Bradford, in a locker-room interview on re-joining of the Seattle football team, stated how his return to Seattle "feels like home. I’m close to all the guys. They welcomed me with open arms. And I love being here. There’s not a place like this. So I’m just appreciative and I just want to work."

=== Atlanta Falcons ===
Bradford signed with the Atlanta Falcons on February 13, 2015. He was released on October 27, 2015.

== Personal life ==
Bradford is from Colton, California. At Colton High School, Bradford was a linebacker and running back. Bradford has two children, Mahlia Liana Bradford and Aiden Lord Bradford. On July 2, 2016, he married Vanessa Portillo.
