= 2015 Cure Bowl =

American college football game

2015 AutoNation Cure Bowl
- 1st Cure Bowl
San Jose State Spartans	Georgia State Panthers
(5–7)	(6–6)
Mountain West	Sun Belt
27	16
Head coach: Ron Caragher	Head coach: Trent Miles
	1	2	3	4	Total
San Jose State	0	10	3	14	27
Georgia State	0	7	0	9	16
- Date: December 19, 2015
- Season: 2015
- Stadium: Orlando Citrus Bowl
- Location: Orlando, Florida
- MVP: San Jose State QB Kenny Potter
- Favorite: San Jose St. by 1
- National anthem: Girl Scouts of Citrus
- Referee: Steve LaMantia (C-USA)
- Attendance: 18,536
- Payout: US$TBD

United States TV coverage
- Network: CBSSN/iHeartRadio
- Announcers: Carter Blackburn, Aaron Taylor, & Jenny Dell (CBSSN); Paul Kennedy, Max Starks, & Jamie Seh (iHeartRadio)

The 2015 Cure Bowl was a postseason American college football bowl game played on December 19, 2015, at Orlando Citrus Bowl in Orlando, Florida. The first edition of the Cure Bowl featured the San Jose State Spartans of the Mountain West Conference against the Georgia State Panthers of the Sun Belt Conference. It began at 7:00 p.m. EST and aired on CBS Sports Network. It was one of the 2015–16 bowl games that concluded the 2015 FBS football season. Sponsored by automotive retailer AutoNation, the game was officially known as the AutoNation Cure Bowl.

== Teams ==
The game featured the San Jose State Spartans against the Georgia State Panthers. It was the first overall meeting between the two schools.

=== San Jose State Spartans ===
Because the Spartans finished 5–7 in their regular season, they would ordinarily be bowl-ineligible. However, only 77 teams finished at .500 or better on the season, leaving three bowl slots open to 5–7 teams based on their Academic Progress Rate (APR). The Spartans ranked fourth among such teams, after Nebraska and Missouri and together with Minnesota. However, since Missouri did not accept a bowl bid, the Spartans were invited to the Cure Bowl, which they accepted.

This was the Spartans' tenth bowl game (with a 6–3 all-time record in bowl games) and their first since the 2012 Military Bowl, where they defeated Bowling Green by a score of 29–20.

=== Georgia State Panthers ===
After finishing 6–6 in their regular season, bowl director Alan Gooch extended an invitation for the Panthers to play in the game, which they accepted.

This was the first bowl game in school history for Georgia State, seven years after football was approved, five years after they kicked off, and two years after joining the Football Bowl Subdivision. This ties the record for a team going from conception to a bowl berth, set the season prior by South Alabama.

== Game summary ==
=== Scoring Summary ===
Scoring summary

Quarter	Time	Drive			Team	Scoring information	Score	
Quarter	Time	Plays	Yards	TOP	Team	Scoring information	SJ	GSU
2	11:05	14	75	7:36	SJ	19-yard field goal by Austin Lopez	3	0
2	8:56	—	—	—	SJ	Tyler Ervin 85-yard punt return for a touchdown, Austin Lopez kick good	10	0
2	7:04	5	87	1:52	GSU	Donovan Harden 38-yard touchdown reception from Nick Arbuckle, Wil Lutz kick good	10	7
3	0:02	8	33	3:20	SJ	19-yard field goal by Austin Lopez	13	7
4	12:44	4	−3	1:16	GSU	Team safety	13	9
4	10:46	4	36	1:58	GSU	Todd Boyd 19-yard touchdown reception from Nick Arbuckle, Wil Lutz kick good	13	16
4	9:15	3	66	1:31	SJ	Kenny Potter 42-yard touchdown run, Austin Lopez kick good	20	16
4	2:40	11	49	5:10	SJ	Josh Oliver 1-yard touchdown reception from Kenny Potter, Austin Lopez kick good	27	16
"TOP" = time of possession. For other American football terms, see Glossary of American football.							27	16

=== Statistics ===
Statistics	SJSU	GSU
First downs	20	11
Plays–yards	75–286	53–231
Rushes–yards	54–197	20–23
Passing yards	89	208
Passing: Comp–Att–Int	10–19–1	14–29–1
Time of possession	38:19	21:41

Team	Category	Player	Statistics
SJSU	Passing	Kenny Potter	10/19, 89 yds, 1 TD, 1 INT
SJSU	Rushing	Tyler Ervin	30 car, 132 yds
SJSU	Receiving	Justin Holmes	3 rec, 48 yds
GSU	Passing	Nick Arbuckle	14/29, 208 yds, 2 TD, 1 INT
GSU	Rushing	Glenn Smith	6 car, 22 yds
GSU	Receiving	Ari Werts	3 rec, 63 yds
